= Carly Pearce discography =

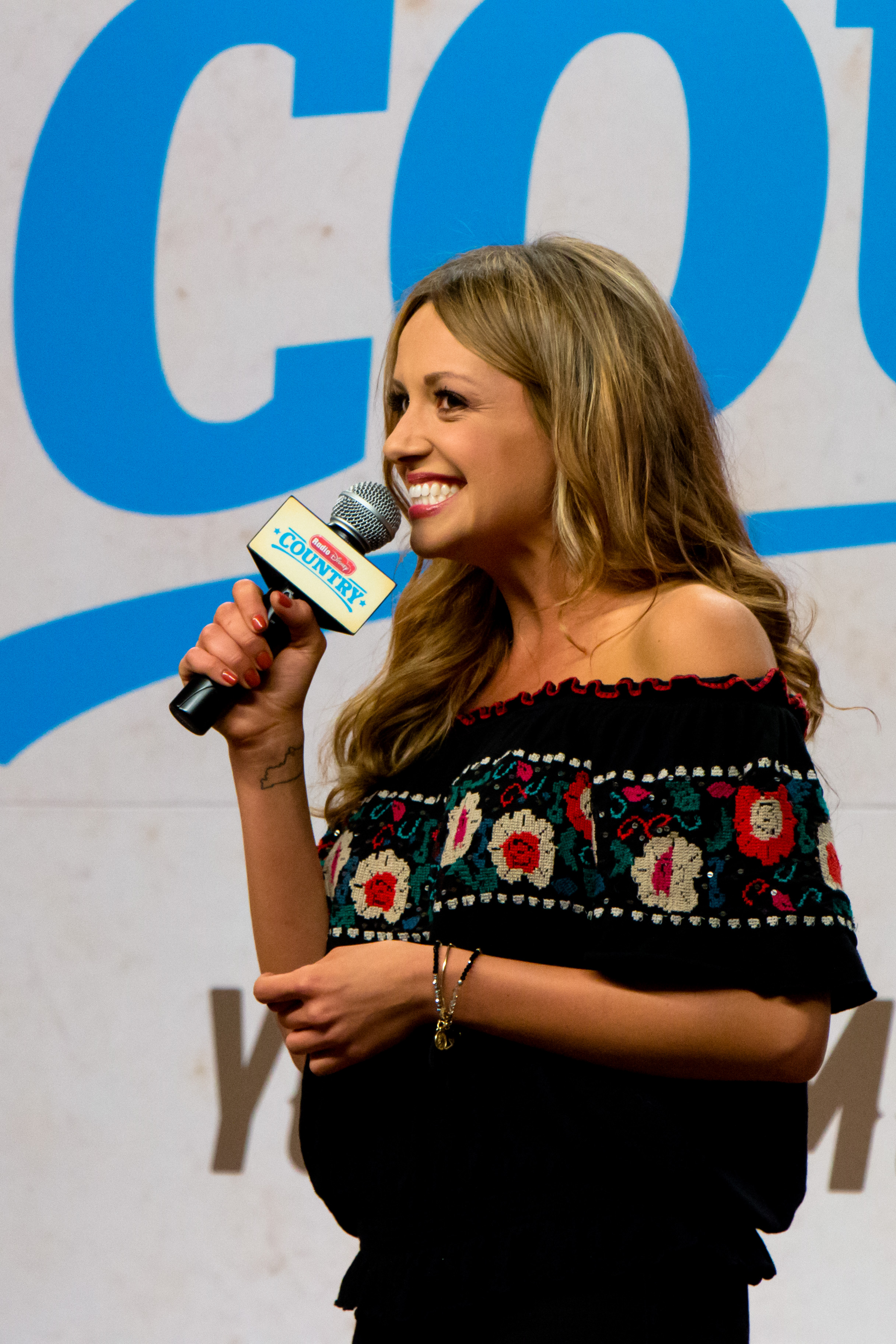
- Pearce at the CMA Music Festival, 2017
- Studio albums: 5
- EPs: 1
- Live albums: 1
- Singles: 10
- Music videos: 9
- Promotional singles: 14
- Other appearances: 18

The discography of American country music artist Carly Pearce consists of five studio albums, one live album, one extended play, nine singles, 14 promotional singles, nine music videos and 18 album appearances. Before being signed to a recording contract, Pearce contributed her vocals to several albums of bluegrass music in the 2000s. In 2016, she collaborated with the Josh Abbott Band on the single "Wasn't That Drunk". It reached number 37 on the Billboard Country Airplay chart the same year.

Shortly thereafter, Pearce independently released the song "Every Little Thing". The song gained exposure after being featured on satellite radio, which helped her sign with Big Machine Records. Re-released through the label, "Every Little Thing" peaked at number one on the Billboard Country Airplay chart and number five on the Billboard Hot Country Songs chart in 2017. Pearce's debut album of the same name was released in October 2017, debuting at number four on the Billboard Top Country Albums chart. "Hide the Wine" was the second single spawned from her 2017 album, reaching number 13 on the Country Airplay chart in 2018.

In 2018, Pearce released her third single, "Closer to You". Spending nearly a year on the Billboard country charts, it reached minor positions including the Hot Country Songs chart where it reached number 33. Later in 2019, she issued a duet single with Lee Brice titled "I Hope You're Happy Now". Becoming a major hit on the Billboard country charts, Pearce released her self-titled second studio album in February 2020. The album debuted at number 6 on the Top Country Albums chart and at number 73 on the Billboard 200. In September 2021, Pearce released her third studio album titled 29: Written in Stone featuring the lead single, "Next Girl" and second single, "Never Wanted to Be That Girl" featuring Ashley McBryde. The album debuted at number 9 on the Top Country Albums chart and number 83 on the Billboard 200.

== Albums ==
=== Studio albums ===
List of albums, with selected chart positions and sales, showing other relevant details
Title	Album details	Peak chart positions			Certifications
Title	Album details	US	US Cou.	CAN	Certifications
Every Little Thing	Released: October 13, 2017; Label: Big Machine; Formats: CD, music download	32	4	77	
Carly Pearce	Released: February 14, 2020; Label: Big Machine; Formats: CD, music download, LP	73	6	—	MC: Gold
29: Written in Stone	Released: September 17, 2021; Label: Big Machine; Formats: CD, music download, LP	83	9	—	MC: Gold
Hummingbird	Released: June 7, 2024; Label: Big Machine; Formats: CD, music download, LP	158	31	—	
Honest Woman	Released: August 28, 2026; Label: BBR/BMG; Formats: CD, music download, LP	—	—	—	
"—" denotes a recording that did not chart or was not released in that territory.

=== Live albums ===
List of albums, with selected chart positions, showing other relevant details
Title	Album details	Peak chart positions
Title	Album details	US Country
29: Written in Stone (Live from Music City)	Released: March 24, 2023; Label: Big Machine; Formats: CD, LP, music download	46

== Extended plays ==
List of EPs, with selected chart positions, showing other relevant details
Title	EP details	Peak chart positions	
Title	EP details	US	US Cou.
29	Released: February 19, 2021; Label: Big Machine; Formats: Music download	83	9

== Singles ==
=== As lead artist ===
Title	Year	Peak chart positions					Certifications	Album
Title	Year	US	US Cou.	US Cou. Air.	CAN	CAN Cou.	Certifications	Album
"Every Little Thing"	2017	50	5	1	— (Note: "Every Little Thing" did not enter the Canadian Hot 100 chart, but peaked at number 47 on the Canadian Digital Song Sales component chart.)	1	RIAA: Platinum; MC: 2× Platinum	Every Little Thing
"Hide the Wine"	2017	— (Note: "Hide the Wine" did not enter the Billboard Hot 100, but peaked at number seven on the Bubbling Under Hot 100 chart.)	21	13	—	13	RIAA: Gold; MC: Gold	Every Little Thing
"Closer to You"	2018	—	33	28	—	43	RIAA: Gold	Carly Pearce
"I Hope You're Happy Now" (with Lee Brice)	2019	27	5	1	51	1	RIAA: 3× Platinum; MC: 3× Platinum	Carly Pearce
"Next Girl"	2020	86	23	15	55	2	RIAA: Platinum; MC: Platinum	29: Written in Stone
"Never Wanted to Be That Girl" (with Ashley McBryde)	2021	63	13	1	59	1	RIAA: Platinum; MC: Platinum	29: Written in Stone
"What He Didn't Do"	2022	37	11	2	84	4	RIAA: 2× Platinum; MC: Platinum	29: Written in Stone
"We Don't Fight Anymore" (featuring Chris Stapleton)	2023	67	19	9	—	35	RIAA: Platinum	Hummingbird
"Truck on Fire"	2024	—	—	18	—	35		Hummingbird
"Dream Come True"	2025	—	—	40	—	53		Honest Woman
"If I Don't Leave I'm Gonna Stay" (with Riley Green)	2026	— (Note: "If I Don't Leave I'm Gonna Stay" did not enter the Billboard Hot 100, but peaked at number 17 on the Bubbling Under Hot 100 chart.)	40	33	—	—		Honest Woman
"—" denotes a recording that did not chart or was not released in that territory.

=== As a featured artist ===
List of singles, with selected chart positions, showing other relevant details
Title	Year	Peak chart positions				Album
Title	Year	US Bub.	US Cou.	US Cou. Air.	CAN	Album
"Wasn't That Drunk" (Josh Abbott Band with Carly Pearce)	2016	—	46	37	—	Front Row Seat
"Maybe This Christmas" (Michael Bublé with Carly Pearce)	2024	6	22	—	79	Non-album single

=== Promotional singles ===
List of promotional singles, showing all relevant details
Title	Year	Album	Ref.
"If My Name Was Whiskey"	2017	Every Little Thing	
"Color"	2017	Every Little Thing	
"It Won't Always Be Like This"	2019	Carly Pearce	
"You Kissed Me First"	2020	Carly Pearce	
"Call Me"	2020	Carly Pearce	
"Heart's Going Out of Its Mind"	2020	Carly Pearce	
"Cowboy Take Me Away"	2020	—N/a	
"Show Me Around"	2020	29	
"Should've Known Better"	2021	29	
"Dear Miss Loretta" (featuring Patty Loveless)	2021	29: Written in Stone	
"Country Music Made Me Do It"	2023	Hummingbird	
"Heels Over Head"	2023	Hummingbird	
"My Place"	2024	Hummingbird	
"Fault Line"	2024	Hummingbird	
"Church Girl"	2026	Honest Woman	
"You Can Have Him"	2026	Honest Woman	
"She Don't"	2026	Honest Woman	

== Music videos ==
List of music videos, showing year released and director
Title	Year	Director(s)	Ref.
"Wasn't That Drunk" (Live) (with Josh Abbott Band)	2016	Zack Morris	
"Wasn't That Drunk" (Version 2) (with Josh Abbott Band)	2016	Evan Kaufmann	
"Every Little Thing"	2017	Patrick Tracy	
"Hide the Wine"	2018	Shaun Silva	
"Closer to You"	2019	Mason Dixon; Roman White	
"I Hope You're Happy Now" (with Lee Brice)	2019	Sam Siske	
"Next Girl"	2020	Seth Kupersmith	
"Never Wanted to Be That Girl" (with Ashley McBryde)	2021	Alexa Campbell	
"What He Didn't Do"	2022	Alexa Campbell	
"We Don't Fight Anymore" (with Chris Stapleton)	2023	Alexa Campbell	
"Truck on Fire"	2024	Alexa Campbell	

== Other album appearances ==
List of non-single guest appearances, with other performing artists, showing year released and album name
Title	Year	Other artist(s)	Album	Ref.
"Hark! The Herald Angels Sing"	2007	—N/a	Mountain Top Bluegrass Gospel Christmas	
"Amen"	2007	—N/a	Mountain Top Bluegrass Gospel Christmas	
"Joyful, Joyful We Adore Thee"	2007	—N/a	Mountain Top Bluegrass Gospel Christmas	
"O Come All Ye Faithful"	2007	—N/a	Mountain Top Bluegrass Gospel Christmas	
"God Rest Ye Merry Gentlemen"	2007	—N/a	Mountain Top Bluegrass Gospel Christmas	
"What Child Is This"	2007	—N/a	Mountain Top Bluegrass Gospel Christmas	
"It Came Upon a Midnight Clear"	2007	—N/a	Mountain Top Bluegrass Gospel Christmas	
"A Place in This World"	2008	Clay Hess; Josh Miller; Jason Moore; Aaron Ramsey; Jim Van Cleve	The Bluegrass Tribute to Taylor Swift	
"Cold as You"	2008	Clay Hess; Josh Miller; Jason Moore; Aaron Ramsey; Jim Van Cleve	The Bluegrass Tribute to Taylor Swift	
"The Outside"	2008	Clay Hess; Josh Miller; Jason Moore; Aaron Ramsey; Jim Van Cleve	The Bluegrass Tribute to Taylor Swift	
"Tied Together with a Smile"	2008	Clay Hess; Josh Miller; Jason Moore; Aaron Ramsey; Jim Van Cleve	The Bluegrass Tribute to Taylor Swift	
"Should've Said No"	2008	Clay Hess; Josh Miller; Jason Moore; Aaron Ramsey; Jim Van Cleve	The Bluegrass Tribute to Taylor Swift	
"Mary's Song (Oh My, My, My)"	2008	Clay Hess; Josh Miller; Jason Moore; Aaron Ramsey; Jim Van Cleve	The Bluegrass Tribute to Taylor Swift	
"I'll Be Your Everything"	2020	Shenandoah	Every Road	
"Friends Don't Let Friends"	2021	Lady A Thomas Rhett; Darius Rucker	What a Song Can Do	
"What If We Did"	2022	Walker Hayes	Country Stuff the Album	
"You're Drunk, Go Home"	2022	Kelsea Ballerini; Kelly Clarkson	Subject to Change	
"Girls Night Out"	2023	Reba McEntire; Jennifer Nettles; Gabby Barrett	A Tribute to The Judds	
