= List of awards and nominations received by Carly Pearce =

Carly Pearce awards and nominations
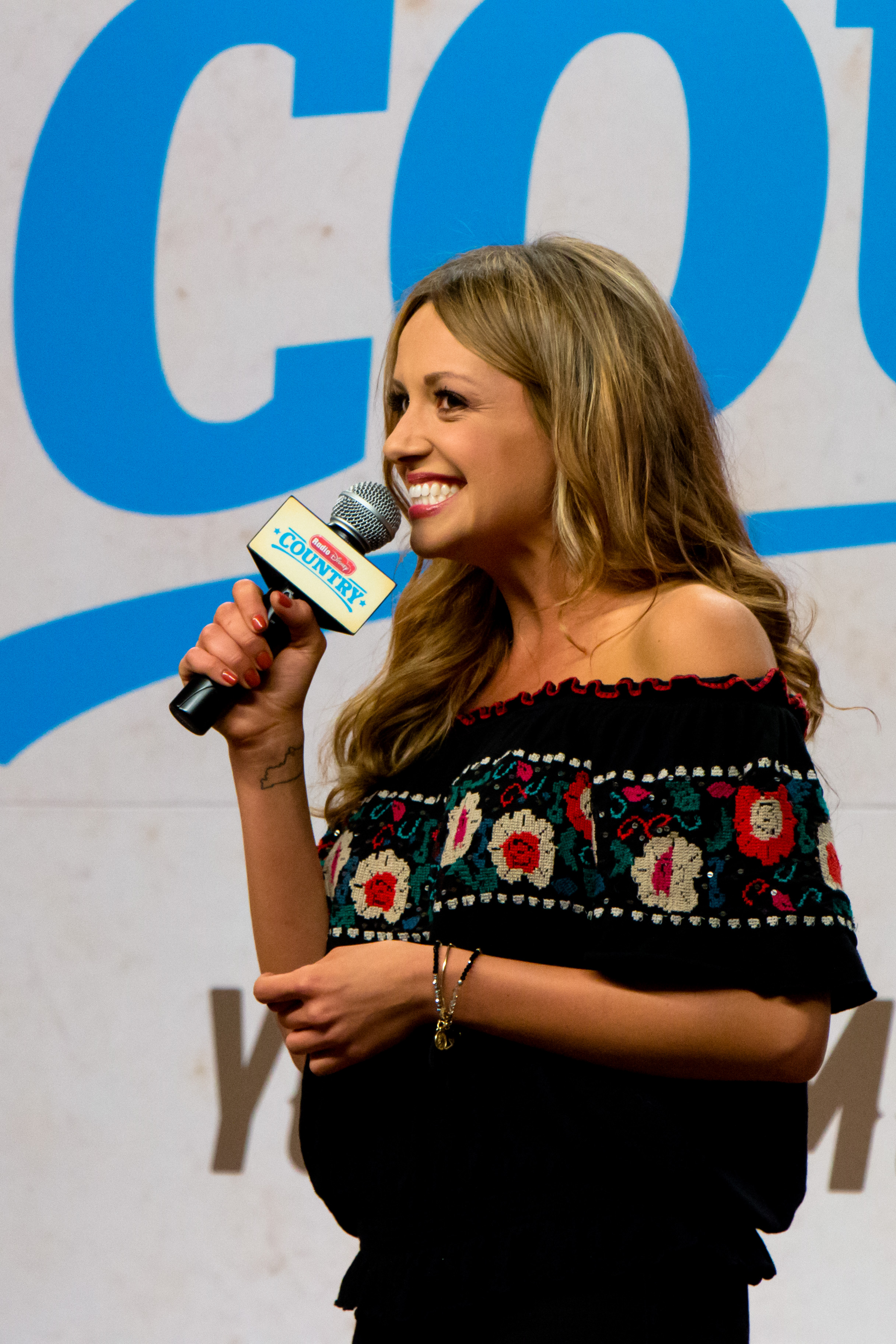
- Pearce in 2017.
Awards and nominations
Award	Wins	Nominations
Academy of Country Music	4	8
CMT Music Awards	1	7
Country Music Association	3	11
Grammy Awards	1	1

Totals (Note: Certain award groups do not simply award one winner. They acknowledge several different recipients, have runners-up, and have third place. Since this is a specific recognition and is different from losing an award, runner-up mentions are considered wins in this award tally. For simplification and to avoid errors, each award in this list has been presumed to have had a prior nomination.)
- Wins: 9
- Nominations: 27

American country artist Carly Pearce has been nominated for 27 awards and won nine. The first award Pearce received was from the CMT Music Awards for her music video for "Every Little Thing". Her next award came from the Academy of Country Music Awards who gave her two awards for her duet with Lee Brice "I Hope You're Happy Now". In 2022, she received the Female Vocalist of the Year award from the ACM's as well as Musical Event of the Year for her duet with Ashley McBryde "Never Wanted to Be That Girl". She has since received eight nominations from the ACM Awards.

In 2020, she won her first accolade from the Country Music Association Awards for her same duet with Lee Brice. The CMA Awards has since nominated her a total of 11 times. She won her second trophy for Musical Event of the Year for her collaboration with Ashley McBryde. The same year she also won the Female Vocalist of the Year award. In 2023, she won her first accolade from the Grammy Awards for her same duet with McBryde. The Grammy's nominated her again in 2024 for her duet with Chris Stapleton "We Don't Fight Anymore".

== Academy of Country Music Awards ==
Year	Nominee / work	Award	Result	Ref.
2018	Carly Pearce	New Female Vocalist of the Year	Nominated	
2019	Carly Pearce	New Female Vocalist of the Year	Nominated	
2020	Carly Pearce	Female Artist of the Year	Nominated	
2020	"I Hope You're Happy Now"	Single of the Year (with Lee Brice)	Won	
2020	"I Hope You're Happy Now"	Music Event of the Year (with Lee Brice)	Won	
2022	Carly Pearce	Female Artist of the Year	Won	
2022	29: Written in Stone	Album of the Year	Nominated	
2022	"Never Wanted to Be That Girl"	Video of the Year (with Ashley McBryde)	Nominated	
2022	"Never Wanted to Be That Girl"	Music Event of the Year (with Ashley McBryde)	Won	
2023	Carly Pearce	Female Artist of the Year	Nominated	
2023	"Never Wanted to Be That Girl"	Single of the Year (with Ashley McBryde)	Nominated	
2023	"What He Didn't Do"	Visual Media of the Year	Nominated	

== CMT Music Awards ==
Year	Nominee / work	Award	Result	Ref.
2018	"Every Little Thing"	Breakthrough Video of the Year	Won	
2018	"Every Little Thing"	Video of the Year	Nominated	
2019	"Closer to You"	Female Video of the Year	Nominated	
2021	"Next Girl"	Female Video of the Year	Nominated	
2022	"Never Wanted to Be That Girl"	Collaborative Video of the Year (with Ashley McBryde)	Nominated	
2022	"Dear Miss Loretta"	Digital – First Performance of the Year	Nominated	
2023	"One Way Ticket"	CMT Performance of the Year (with Ashley McBryde and LeAnn Rimes)	Nominated	
2023	"What He Didn't Do"	Female Video of the Year	Nominated	

== Country Music Association Awards ==
Year	Nominee / work	Award	Result	Ref.
2019	Carly Pearce	New Artist of the Year	Nominated	
2020	Carly Pearce	New Artist of the Year	Nominated	
2020	"I Hope You're Happy Now"	Song of the Year – (with Lee Brice)	Nominated	
2020	"I Hope You're Happy Now"	Musical Event of the Year – (with Lee Brice)	Won	
2020	"I Hope You're Happy Now"	Video of the Year – (with Lee Brice)	Nominated	
2021	29	Album of the Year	Nominated	
2021	Carly Pearce	Female Vocalist of the Year	Won	
2022	Carly Pearce	Female Vocalist of the Year	Nominated	
2022	"Never Wanted to Be That Girl"	Single of the Year – (with Ashley McBryde)	Nominated	
2022	"Never Wanted to Be That Girl"	Song of the Year – (with Shane McAnally and Ashley McBryde)	Nominated	
2022	"Never Wanted to Be That Girl"	Musical Event of the Year – (with Ashley McBryde)	Won	
2022	"Never Wanted to Be That Girl"	Video of the Year – (with Ashley McBryde)	Nominated	
2023	Carly Pearce	Female Vocalist of the Year	Nominated	
2023	"We Don't Fight Anymore"	Musical Event of the Year – (feat Chris Stapleton)	Nominated	

== Grammy Awards ==
Year	Nominee / work	Award	Result	Ref.
2023	"Never Wanted to Be That Girl" (with Ashley McBryde)	Best Country Duo/Group Performance	Won	
2024	"We Don't Fight Anymore" (with Chris Stapleton)	Best Country Duo/Group Performance	Nominated	

== Grand Ole Opry ==
Year	Nominee / work	Award	Result	Ref.
2021	Carly Pearce	Inducted as a member of the Grand Ole Opry	Inducted	

== People's Choice Country Awards ==
Year	Nominee / work	Award	Result	Ref.
2024	Carly Pearce	Female Artist of the Year	Nominated	
2024	"Hummingbird"	Female Song of the Year	Nominated	
