= 29: Written in Stone (Live from Music City) =

Live album by Carly Pearce
- Released: March 24, 2023
- Venue: Nashville Marathon Music Works
- Genre: Country
- Length: 66:32
- Label: Big Machine
- Producer: David Clauss; Carly Pearce

Carly Pearce chronology
29: Written in Stone (2021)	29: Written in Stone (Live from Music City) (2023)	Hummingbird (2024)

29: Written in Stone (Live from Music City) is a live album by American country artist Carly Pearce. It was released on March 24, 2023, via Big Machine Records and featured 19 tracks. The album was based on Pearce's award-winning 2021 studio album 29: Written in Stone. Many of the album's tracks were live versions of songs that first appeared on that project. It was the first live album of Pearce's career. The album received positive reviews from critics.

== Background ==
Carly Pearce first found success in the country genre with the 2017 single "Every Little Thing". The song certified platinum in the United States and brought forth a top ten album of the same name. She followed it with another top ten album and a top five single in 2020. Pearce found her greatest success with 2021's 29: Written in Stone. The album's tracks captured the feelings following her divorce from country artist Michael Ray. It brought forth a series of major industry awards including a Grammy and an Academy of Country Music award.

Pearce wanted to capture this particular moment of her career and capture her live shows from her most recent tours. To do this, she chose to record a live album. The album was recorded at Nashville Marathon Music Works, a small venue located in Nashville, Tennessee. Pearce herself produced the project, along with David Clauss.

== Content ==
29: Written in Stone (Live from Music City) consists of 19 tracks. In an interview with American Songwriter, Pearce explained that she wanted to capture the intimacy of the 29 tour where she promoted the original album: "I saw more of exactly what the 29 Tour looked like, more of that intimate setting where I’m sharing my music on a very intimate level even if there’s thousands of people there."

It features the entire track listing of 29: Written in Stone, along with Pearce's previous popular singles. Among its previous hits are the songs "I Hope You're Happy Now" (a duet with Lee Brice), "Every Little Thing" and "Hide the Wine". Singer–songwriter Matthew West appears on the track "Truth Be Told", which also did not appear on the original album. Ashley McBryde joined Pearce for a live version of their duet single "Never Wanted to Be That Girl". Bluegrass group The Isaacs performed harmony vocals on an album track from 29: Written in Stone titled "Easy Going". Remaining tracks previously appeared on the original studio version of 29: Written in Stone.

== Release and reception ==
29: Written in Stone (Live from Music City) was first announced to media on February 3, 2023. It was officially released on March 24, 2023, through Big Machine Records. It was offered in multiple formats: a a digital format, a compact disc and a vinyl LP. The album spent one week on the American Billboard Top Country Albums chart, peaking at number 46 in April 2023. It was Pearce's fourth album to make the chart.

The album received a positive response from critics. Music publication Holler Country rated the project an eight out of ten. Writer Dan Warton commented, "What this 29 chapter has truly shown is Pearce’s artistic bravery, authenticity and glowing respect for Country music’s traditions, all of which shine bright on these live recordings." The British publication Entertainment Focus also gave the album a positive response. "29: Written in Stone – Live From Music City is a solid release with some neat and interesting flourishes. The revolving door of special guest appearances serve to put a time stamp down on this part of Pearce’s career and cement, in recording history, Pearce’s achievements over the last 2-3 years," commented James Daykin.

== Track listing ==
29: Written in Stone (Live from Music City)
No.	Title	Length
1.	"Diamondback"	3:13
2.	"What He Didn't Do"	3:15
3.	"Easy Going" (featuring The Isaacs)	5:10
4.	"Dear Miss Loretta"	3:42
5.	"Next Girl"	3:05
6.	"Should've Known Better"	3:05
7.	"29"	3:44
8.	"Never Wanted to Be That Girl" (featuring Ashley McBryde)	3:34
9.	"Your Drinkin', My Problem"	3:40
10.	"Liability"	2:51
11.	"Messy"	3:01
12.	"Show Me Around"	3:53
13.	"Day One"	3:49
14.	"All the Whiskey in the World"	3:07
15.	"Mean It This Time"	4:06
16.	"Truth Be Told" (featuring Matthew West)	4:01
17.	"Every Little Thing"	2:14
18.	"Hide the Wine"	6:07
19.	"I Hope You're Happy Now" (featuring Lee Brice)	4:00

== Charts ==
Weekly chart performance for 29: Written in Stone (Live from Music City)
Chart (2023)	Peak position
US Top Country Albums (Billboard)	46

== Release history ==
Release history and formats for 29: Written in Stone (Live from Music City)
Region	Date	Format	Label	Ref.
North America	March 24, 2023	Compact disc; music download; streaming; vinyl	Big Machine	
