= 56th Annual Country Music Association Awards =

2022 music award ceremony

- Date: November 9, 2022
- Location: Bridgestone Arena, Nashville, Tennessee
- Hosted by: Luke Bryan; Peyton Manning

Highlights
- Most wins: Luke Combs, Cody Johnson, Lainey Wilson (2 each)
- Most nominations: Lainey Wilson (6)

Television/radio coverage
- Network: ABC, Hulu
- Viewership: 9.7 million

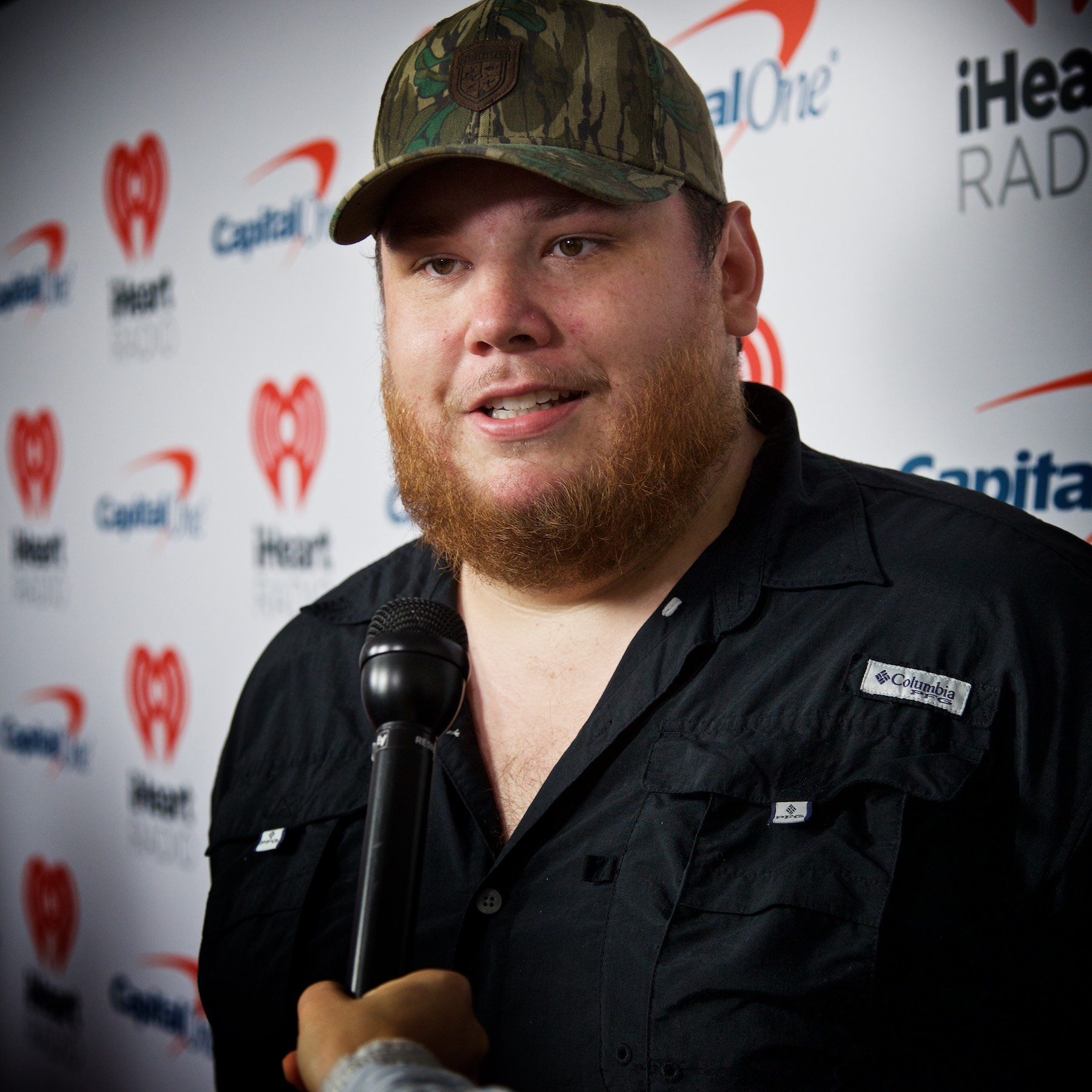
Luke Combs, Entertainer of the Year and Album of the Year recipient.

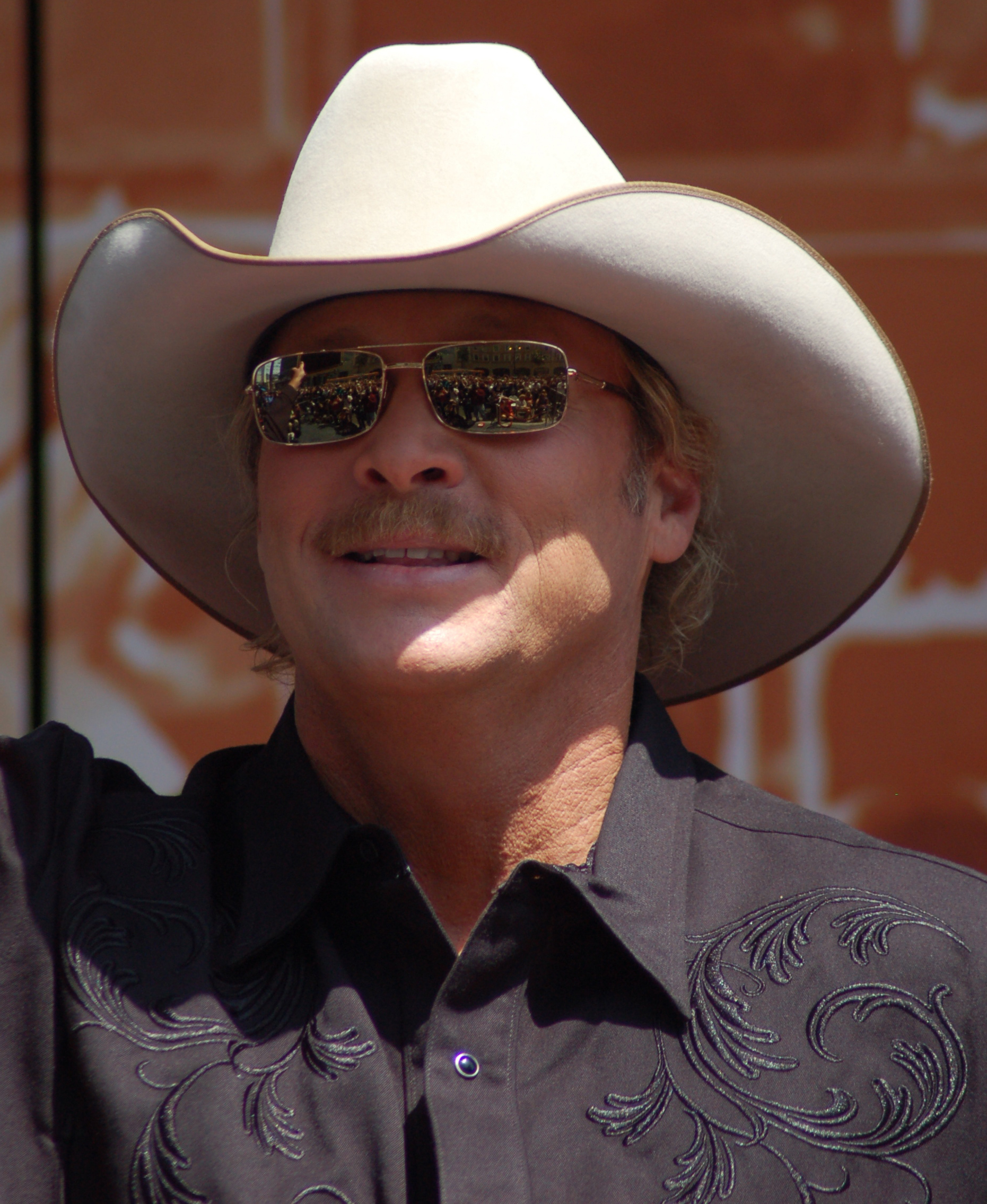
Alan Jackson. Willie Nelson Lifetime Achievement award recipient.

The 56th Annual Country Music Association Awards was held on November 9, 2022 at the Bridgestone Arena in Nashville, Tennessee. Luke Bryan hosted the ceremony for the second time, with Peyton Manning as his co-host. The ceremony was broadcast live on ABC and will be available to stream on Hulu.

== Background ==
The eligibility period for the 56th CMA Awards is July 1, 2021 to June 30, 2022. On August 1, 2022 the CMA Announced that Luke Bryan is set to return as host for the second time and will be accompanied by first-time co-host and former NFL quarterback, Peyton Manning. Robert Deaton is the executive producer and Alan Carter will direct the ceremony. Lainey Wilson leads in nominations with six, closely followed by Ashley McBryde, Carly Pearce and Chris Stapleton who each have five.

On October 27, it was announced that two-time CMA Entertainer of the Year Alan Jackson would be the recipient of the Willie Nelson Lifetime Achievement Award.

== Winners and nominees ==
Nominees were announced on Wednesday, September 7, 2022.

Entertainer of the Year	Album of the Year
Luke Combs; Miranda Lambert; Chris Stapleton; Carrie Underwood; Morgan Wallen	Growin' Up — Luke Combs; Humble Quest — Maren Morris; Palomino — Miranda Lambert; Sayin' What I'm Thinkin' — Lainey Wilson; Time, Tequila & Therapy — Old Dominion
Male Vocalist of the Year	Female Vocalist of the Year
Chris Stapleton; Eric Church; Luke Combs; Cody Johnson; Morgan Wallen	Lainey Wilson; Miranda Lambert; Ashley McBryde; Carly Pearce; Carrie Underwood
Vocal Group of the Year	Vocal Duo of the Year
Old Dominion; Lady A; Little Big Town; Midland; Zac Brown Band	Brothers Osborne; Brooks & Dunn; Dan + Shay; Locash; Maddie & Tae
Single of the Year	Song of the Year
"'TIl You Can't" — Cody Johnson; "Buy Dirt" — Jordan Davis and Luke Bryan; "Half of My Hometown" — Kelsea Ballerini (feat. Kenny Chesney); “Never Wanted to Be That Girl” — Carly Pearce and Ashley McBryde; “You Should Probably Leave” — Chris Stapleton	"Buy Dirt" — Jacob Davis, Jordan Davis, Josh Jenkins, Matt Jenkins; “Never Wanted to Be That Girl” — Shane MacAnally, Ashley McBryde, Carly Pearce; “Sand In My Boots” — Ashley Gorley, Michael Hardy, Josh Osborne; “Things A Man Oughta Know” — Lainey Wilson, Jason Nix, Jonathan Singleton; "You Should Probably Leave" — Chris DuBois, Ashley Gorley, Chris Stapleton
New Artist of the Year	Musician of the Year
Lainey Wilson; HARDY; Walker Hayes; Cody Johnson; Parker McCollum	Jenee Fleenor; Paul Franklin; Brent Mason; Ilya Toshinskiy; Derek Wells
Music Video of the Year	Musical Event of the Year
"'TIl You Can't" — Cody Johnson; (Dir. Dustin Haney); "I Bet You Think About Me" — Taylor Swift (feat. Chris Stapleton); (Dir. Blake Lively); "Longneck Way To Go" — Midland (feat. Jon Pardi); (Dir. Harper Smith); “Never Say Never” — Cole Swindell and Lainey Wilson; (Dir. Michael Monaco); “Never Wanted to Be That Girl” — Carly Pearce and Ashley McBryde; (Dir. Alexa Campbell)	“Never Wanted to Be That Girl” — Carly Pearce and Ashley McBryde; “Beers On Me” — Dierks Bentley, HARDY, Breland; “If I Didn't Love You” — Jason Aldean and Carrie Underwood; "Longneck Way To Go" — Midland (feat. Jon Pardi); “Never Say Never” — Cole Swindell and Lainey Wilson
Willie Nelson Lifetime Achievement Award
Alan Jackson

International Awards

International Artist Achievement Award	Global Country Artist Award
Ashley McBryde; Lindsay Ell; Brothers Osborne; Tenille Townes	Ilse DeLange; Kaylee Bell; Dallas Smith; The Wolfe Brothers

== Performers ==
The first wave of performers was announced on October 25, 2022. The second wave was announced on November 1, 2022.

Performer(s)	Song(s)
Carrie Underwood; Miranda Lambert; Reba McEntire	Tribute to Loretta Lynn "You Ain't Woman Enough" "Don't Come Home A-Drinkin' (With Lovin' on Your Mind)" "You're Looking At Country" "Coal Miner's Daughter"
Ashley McBryde; Brandy Clark; Caylee Hammack; Pillbox Patti; John Osborne	"When Will I Be Loved"
Cody Johnson	"'Til You Can't"
Cole Swindell; Jo Dee Messina	"She Had Me at Heads Carolina"
Miranda Lambert	"Geraldene"
Carrie Underwood	"Hate My Heart"
Luke Combs	"The Kind of Love We Make"
Luke Bryan	"Country On"
Carly Pearce; Ricky Skaggs; Sonya Isaacs; Jenee Fleenor	"Dear Miss Loretta"
Zac Brown Band; Marcus King	"Out in the Middle"
Thomas Rhett; Katy Perry	"Where We Started"
HARDY; Lainey Wilson	"Wait in the Truck"
Kelsea Ballerini; Kelly Clarkson; Carly Pearce	"You're Drunk, Go Home"
Morgan Wallen	"You Proof"
Patty Loveless; Chris Stapleton; Darrell Scott; Morgane Stapleton	"You'll Never Leave Harlan Alive"
Brothers Osborne; The War and Treaty	"It's Only Rock 'n Roll (But I Like It)"
Elle King; The Black Keys	Tribute to Jerry Lee Lewis "Great Balls of Fire"
Carrie Underwood; Dierks Bentley; Jon Pardi; Lainey Wilson; Alan Jackson	Willie Nelson Lifetime Achievement Award honoring Alan Jackson "Remember When" "Chattahoochee" "Drive (For Daddy Gene)" "Chasin' That Neon Rainbow" "Don't Rock The Jukebox"

== Presenters ==
The presenters for the 56th CMA awards were announced on November 3.

Presenter(s)	Notes
Rex Linn and Reba McEntire	Presented Song of the Year
Jeannie Seely	Introduced Miranda Lambert
Little Big Town	Introduced Wynonna Judd
Wynonna Judd	Presented Vocal Duo of the Year
Breland	Chevrolet promotion
Parker McCollum and Jordan Davis	Presented Vocal Group of the Year
Sarah Drew and Tyler Hubbard	Presented Single of the Year
Cole Hauser	Presented Album of the Year
Lady A	Presented New Artist of the Year
Lainey Wilson	Crown Royal and CreatiVets promotion
Carrie Underwood	Presented Willie Nelson Lifetime Achievement Award to Alan Jackson
Ben and Erin Napier	Presented Male Vocalist of the Year
Lionel Richie	Presented Female Vocalist of the Year
Jessica Chastain and Michael Shannon	Presented Entertainer of the Year

== Milestones ==
Courtesy of Billboard.

- As the top nominee with six nods, Lainey Wilson becomes the fourth artist to receive six or more nominations as a first-time nominee. Wilson follows Glen Campbell (1968), Brad Paisley (2000), and Kacey Musgraves (2013) who also had six in their first years.
- With Carrie Underwood and Miranda Lambert's nominations for Entertainer of the Year, this is the first time that two female acts have been nominated in this category three years running since Reba McEntire and The Judds in 1986-88.
- Shane McAnally's Song of the Year nomination for "Never Wanted to Be That Girl" ties him for most nominations in that category with Alan Jackson, with both songwriters achieving ten nods.
- For the first time in CMA history, three of the five nominees in the Single of the Year category are collaborations. "Never Wanted to Be That Girl" by Carly Pearce and Ashley McBryde is also the second all-female collaboration to be nominated in this category, following "Does He Love You" by Reba McEntire and Linda Davis in 1994.
- Miranda Lambert remains the most nominated female artist in CMA history, with 61, and the third most nominated artist overall behind Alan Jackson (81) and George Strait (83). Lambert's sixth Album of the Year nomination for Palomino makes her the most nominated female artist in that category, overtaking McEntire, Underwood and Loretta Lynn who each have five.
- With 16 nods, Lambert and Underwood are tied for the third most nominations in the Female Vocalist of the Year category behind McEntire (18) and Martina McBride (17). Similarly, Lady A's 15th nomination for Vocal Group of the Year put them in joint third with The Statler Brothers and Diamond Rio behind Little Big Town (17) and Alabama (21) for most nominations in the category. Brooks & Dunn also extend their lead as the most nominated act in the Vocal Duo of the Year category, with 23 nominations.
- Paul Franklin continues to extend his streak as the most nominated musician in CMA history, receiving his 29th nomination in the Musician of the Year category. Despite his 30 nominations overall, Franklin is notable for having never won a CMA Award in any category.

== Reception ==
The 56th CMA Awards averaged 7.57 million viewers during their live broadcast on ABC, up ten percent from the previous year's ceremony and becoming the most-watched show in its timeslot.
