= Hummingbird (Carly Pearce album) =

2024 studio album by Carly Pearce

Studio album by Carly Pearce
- Released: June 7, 2024
- Genres: Country; bluegrass
- Length: 47:49
- Label: Big Machine
- Producers: Shane McAnally; Josh Osborne; Carly Pearce

Carly Pearce chronology
29: Written in Stone (Live from Music City) (2023)	Hummingbird (2024)	Honest Woman (2026)

Singles from Hummingbird
- 1. "We Don't Fight Anymore" Released: June 16, 2023; 2. "Truck on Fire" Released: July 29, 2024

Hummingbird is the fourth studio album by American country music artist Carly Pearce. Hummingbird was released on June 7, 2024, via Big Machine Records and follows on from her 2021 album 29: Written in Stone. The project contains fourteen tracks, and was produced by Pearce for the first time, alongside regular collaborators Shane McAnally and Josh Osborne. It was preceded by the lead single "We Don't Fight Anymore", as well as promotional singles "Country Music Made Me Do It", "Heels Over Head", and the title track. A deluxe edition of the album, titled Hummingbird: No Rain, No Flowers, was released on March 14, 2025.

== Background ==
On February 19, 2021, Pearce released 29, a seven track extended play produced by Shane McAnally, Josh Osborne, and Jimmy Robbins about the struggles in her personal life during her 29th year. The project was critically acclaimed and so Pearce re-teamed with the trio alongside Tony Brown to release a full-length version, which would become her third studio album 29: Written in Stone, on September 17, 2021. Pearce promoted the project throughout 2022 and 2023 before beginning work on a follow-up.

The album was announced on March 1, 2024. In a press release about the album, she explained "the last few years have been a season of loss and growth, of healing and happiness. A belief that if I did the inner work, I would rebuild myself stronger than I was before, and a knowing that I have done some living and will always be unapologetic about it. These 14 songs incapsulate my confidence that there is light on the other side of darkness and my true love of country music. When you hear this album — Wherever you are on your journey, I hope it shows you that pain can be a lesson that shows you just how strong you are and what you truly deserve, that we can all find the 'hummingbird' in the midst of whatever we're going through."

Speaking to Billboard about developing the album, Pearce expressed that she felt intimidated about the thought of creating a successor to 29: Written in Stone, noting that the album had been more successful than she had expected, but that she had drawn on the strength and vulnerability she had tapped into during the creation of that project to inform her creative decisions on Hummingbird. The title track was the last one written for the album, which was originally set to be titled Country Music Made Me Do It. Pearce advised that the primary theme of the album is healing, and that the first half of the record's fourteen tracks are lighthearted and playful by design, noting that "with the healing comes a great freedom and joy". Sonically, Pearce and her producers chose to "double down" on the traditional country instrumentation present on 29: Written in Stone, with Pearce citing classic artists Loretta Lynn, Tammy Wynette, and George Jones, as well as contemporary artists like Kacey Musgraves as influences on the sound and visuals for the project.

The album was re-issued on March 14, 2025, under the title: Hummingbird: No Rain, No Flowers, adding three bonus tracks and two live performances of prior album cuts. "If Looks Could Kill" and "Heart First", which were originally written during sessions for 29: Written in Stone, were songs that Pearce continued to revisit despite not including them on that album, leading to her adding them to the deluxe edition of her fourth album. The album's other new track, "No Rain", was written more recently for Pearce's forthcoming fifth studio album, but she decided to put it out early as part of "the final piece of her healing journey".

=== Singles ===
Pearce released the album's lead single, "We Don't Fight Anymore", which features harmony vocals from Chris Stapleton, on June 16, 2023. "Truck on Fire" was released as the album's second single in July 2024.

The first promotional single for the album, "Country Music Made Me Do It", was released on August 11, 2023. A press release described the track as "an upbeat, cheeky love letter to the genre that chronicles Pearce's long standing relationship to country music and the impact it has had on her life." The second promotional singe, "Heels Over Head", was released on October 6, 2023, and is described as "a sassy, fun, cheeky (and incredibly sarcastic) little tune about Carly coming to the realization that the guy she likes doesn't want to work quite so hard for a good time." The title track was released as the third promotional single alongside the announcement of the album on March 1, 2024. Speaking about the song, Pearce stated "when I wrote this song, I knew I wanted this to be the title of the album. This song plays on my bluegrass roots but also lyrically tells the story of the journey I am on of finding love. This is the most unapologetically 'Carly' song I've ever written." Two more promotional singles were released ahead of the album: "My Place" and "Fault Line". The first single from the deluxe album, "No Rain" was released on February 21, 2024.

== Track listing ==
Hummingbird track listing
No.	Title	Writer(s)	Length
1.	"Country Music Made Me Do It"	Carly Pearce; Shane McAnally; Josh Osborne	3:29
2.	"Truck on Fire"	Pearce; Justin Ebach; Charles Kelley	3:08
3.	"Still Blue"	Pearce; Osborne; Natalie Hemby	3:24
4.	"Heels Over Head"	Pearce; McAnally; Osborne	3:14
5.	"We Don't Fight Anymore" (featuring Chris Stapleton)	Pearce; McAnally; Pete Good	3:38
6.	"Rock Paper Scissors"	Pearce; McAnally; Nicolle Galyon; Jordan Reynolds	2:41
7.	"Oklahoma"	Pearce; Galyon; Reynolds	3:39
8.	"My Place"	Pearce; Reynolds; Lauren Hungate	3:38
9.	"Things I Don't Chase"	Robyn Dell'Unto; Kat Higgins; Ava Supplesa	3:14
10.	"Woman to Woman"	Pearce; Hungate; Tofer Brown	2:50
11.	"Fault Line"	Pearce; Galyon; McAnally; Reynolds	3:19
12.	"Pretty Please"	Pearce; McAnally; Osborne	4:07
13.	"Trust Issues"	Pearce; Galyon; Reynolds	3:01
14.	"Hummingbird"	Pearce; Galyon; McAnally; Reynolds	4:27
Total length:			47:49

Hummingbird: No Rain, No Flowers track listing
No.	Title	Writer(s)	Length
15.	"If Looks Could Kill"	Pearce; Jimmy Robbins; Emily Shackelton	3:13
16.	"Heart First"	Pearce; Shackelton; Ben West	3:52
17.	"No Rain"	Pearce; Reynolds; Hungate; Emily Weisband	3:00
18.	"Oklahoma" (Live from Vevo)	Pearce; Galyon; Reynolds	3:39
19.	"Things I Don't Chase" (Live from Vevo)	Dell'Unto; Higgins; Supplesa	3:16
Total length:			1:04:00

== Personnel ==
Credits adapted from Tidal.

=== Musicians ===
- Carly Pearce – lead vocals (all tracks), background vocals (tracks 3, 15)
- Josh Matheny – Dobro (all tracks), lap steel guitar (tracks 1, 2, 7, 8, 10, 13, 16, 17), steel guitar (3)
- Jenee Fleenor – fiddle (tracks 1–14), violin (15–17)
- Ilya Toshinskiy – acoustic guitar (tracks 1–14), mandolin (1, 3), banjo (4, 13)
- Craig Young – bass guitar (tracks 1–14)
- Sol Philcox-Littlefield – electric guitar (1–14)
- Ryan Gore – percussion (1–14), programming (track 5)
- Alex Wright – Wurlitzer electric piano (tracks 1, 7, 10, 11), Mellotron (1), Hammond B3 (2, 3, 6), piano (2, 4, 5, 8, 9, 13, 14), Wurlitzer organ (3), synthesizer (7–9, 13, 14), Rhodes (12), keyboards (15–17)
- Josh Osborne – background vocals (tracks 1–4, 6–14)
- Fred Eltringham – percussion (tracks 1, 3–5, 13), drums (1, 3, 4, 13)
- Aaron Sterling – drums (tracks 2, 5–12, 14), percussion (2, 5–9, 14)
- Chris Stapleton – lead vocals, background vocals (track 5)
- Pete Good – programming (track 5)
- Philip Noel – bass guitar (tracks 15–19)
- Jon Aanestad – electric guitar (tracks 15), violin (16–19)
- Nick Huddleston – electric guitar (tracks 15–17); acoustic guitar, background vocals (18, 19)
- Daniel Johnson – drums, percussion (tracks 15–17)
- Seth Taylor – acoustic guitar (tracks 15–17)
- Jordan Reynolds – background vocals (track 17)
- BC Taylor – drums, percussion (tracks 18, 19)

=== Technical ===
- Carly Pearce – production
- Shane McAnally – production (tracks 1–14)
- Josh Osborne – production (tracks 1–14)
- Dave Clauss – production, engineering (tracks 15–17); mixing (15–19); vocal production, vocal engineering, editing, vocal editing (2, 7–12, 14)
- Ted Jensen – mastering (1–14)
- Adam Ayan – mastering (15–19)
- Ryan Gore – mixing, engineering (tracks 1–14); editing (2, 5, 7–12, 14); vocal production, vocal engineering, vocal editing (3, 6, 13)
- Casey Graham – engineering (tracks 18, 19)
- Josh Osborne – vocal production (tracks 2, 3, 6–14)
- Phillip Smith – vocal engineering (track 5)
- Will Duperier – vocal engineering (track 5)
- Chris Small – editing (tracks 1, 3–8)
- Mike Stankiewicz – editing (tracks 2, 7–12, 14, 15), vocal editing (2, 7–12, 14)
- Kam Luchterhand – engineering assistance (tracks 1, 3–6, 13)
- Sean Badum – engineering assistance (tracks 2, 7–12, 14)
- Todd Tidwell – engineering assistance (tracks 15–17)

== Charts ==
Chart performance for Hummingbird
Chart (2024)	Peak position
Australian Digital Albums (ARIA)	22
Scottish Albums (Official Charts)	38
UK Album Downloads (Official Charts)	15
UK Country Albums (Official Charts)	2
US Billboard 200	158
US Independent Albums (Billboard)	25
US Top Country Albums (Billboard)	31
