= Country Music Association Award for Musical Event of the Year =

Annual music award

- Country: United States
- Presented by: Country Music Association
- First award: 1988
- Currently held by: Morgan Wallen, Hardy, Eric Church and Tim McGraw (2026)

The Country Music Association Awards is a major awards show in country music. Originally presented in 1988 as the Vocal Event of the Year Award, the Musical Event of the Year honor received its current name in 2004. The award recognizes a collaboration of two or more people, either or all of whom are known primarily as country artists, who don't regularly work together as part of a duo or group.

The inaugural recipients of the award were Dolly Parton, Linda Ronstadt and Emmylou Harris in 1988 for their collaborative Trio album. Brad Paisley, Keith Urban, Kenny Chesney, Tim McGraw and Vince Gill hold the record for most wins in the category, with four each, while Chesney has a leading thirteen nominations. Johnny Cash and Maren Morris hold the record for most nominations without a win, with six. The current holders of the award are Ella Langley and Riley Green, who won for their duet "You Look Like You Love Me" at the 58th Annual Country Music Association Awards in 2024.

== Recipients ==
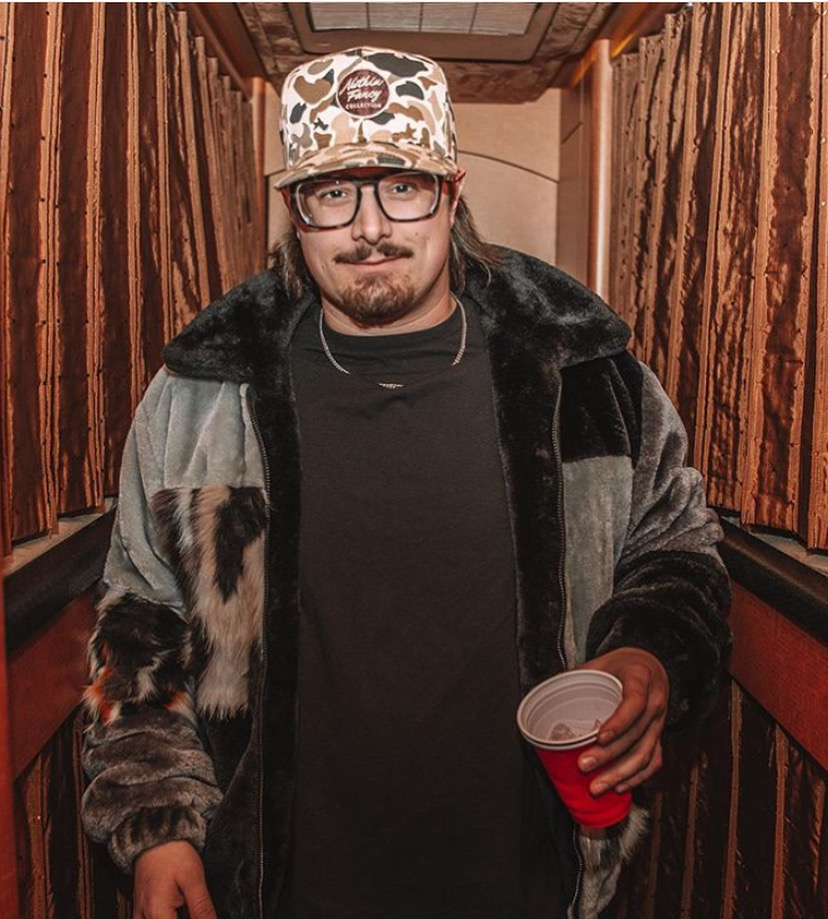
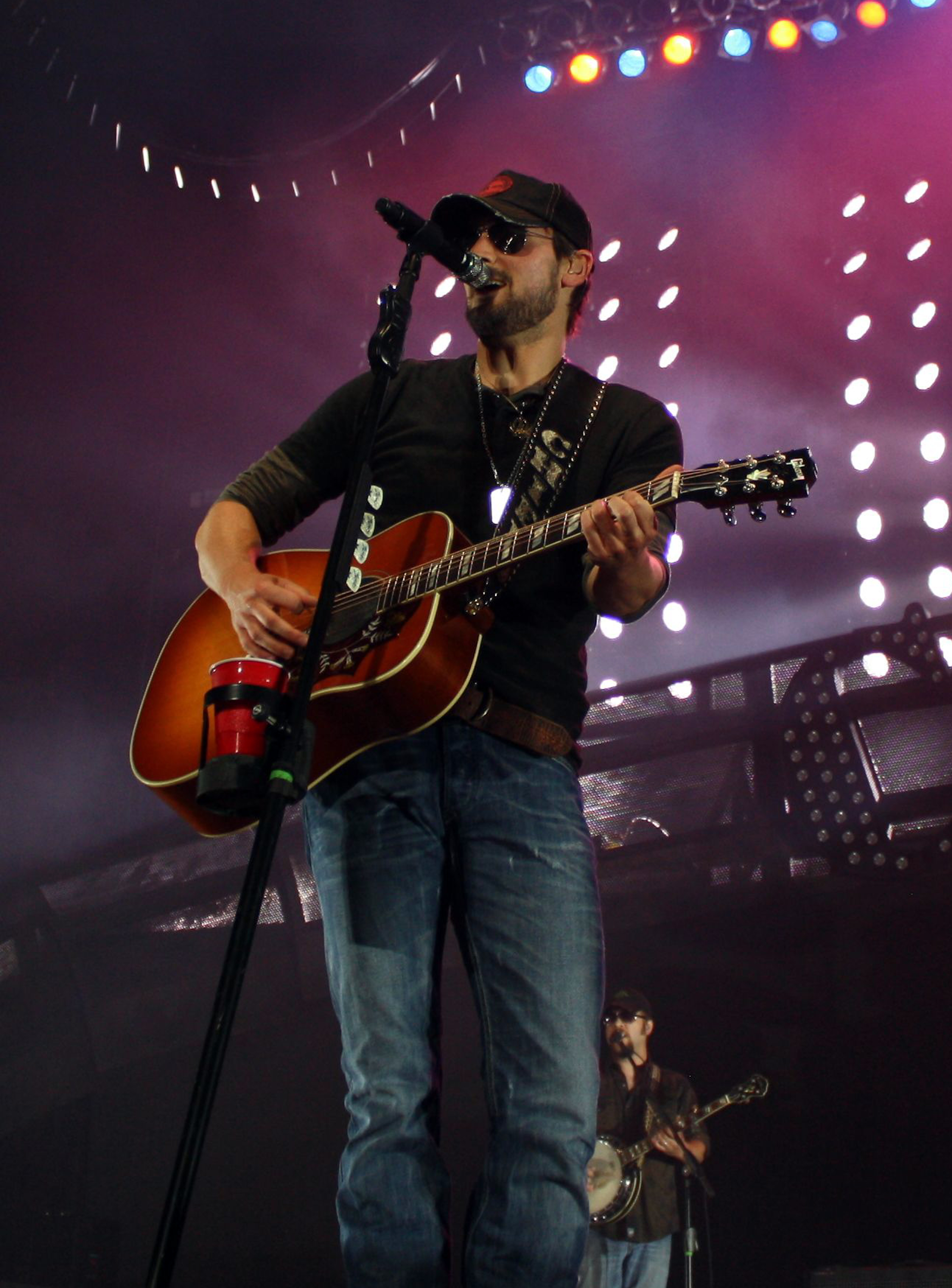
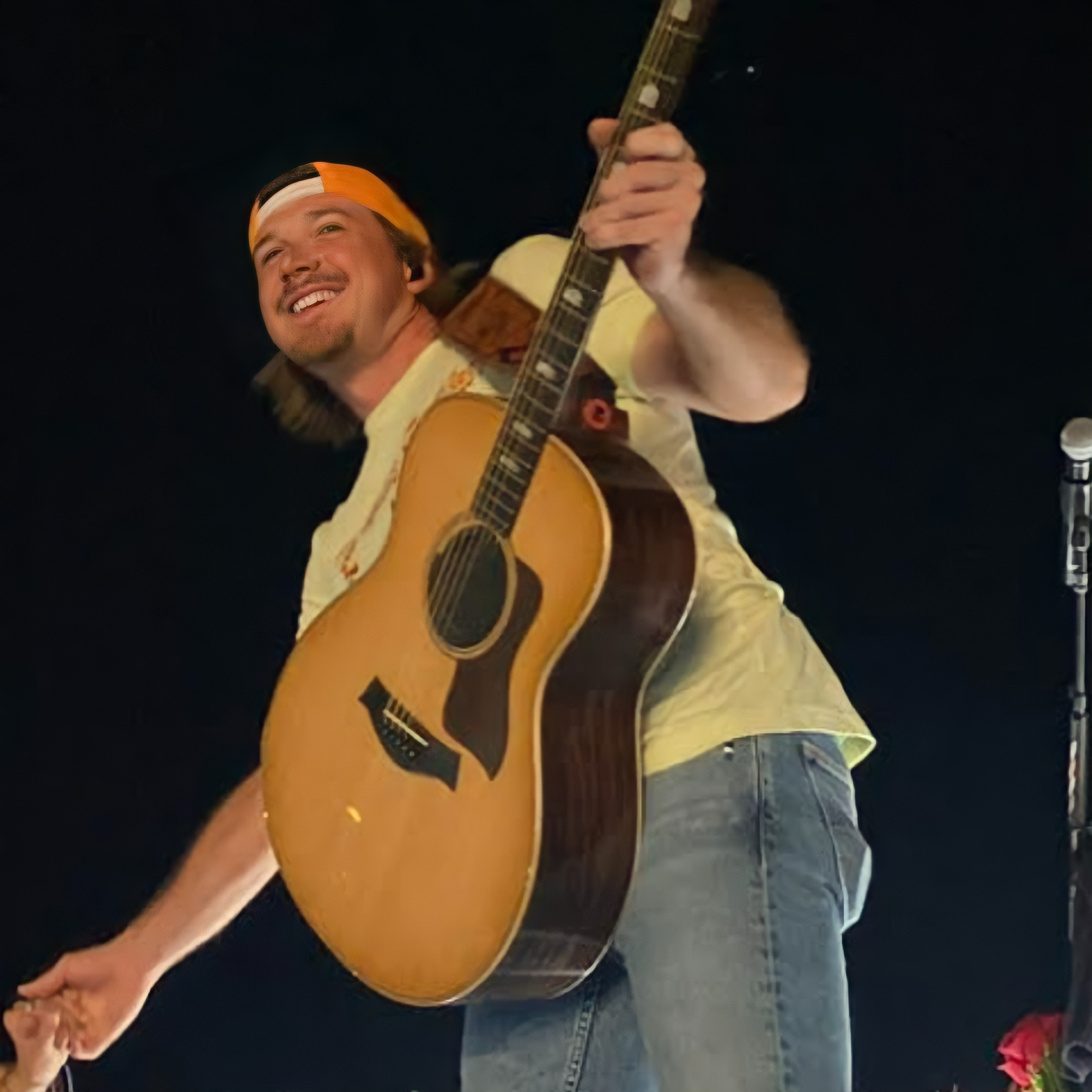
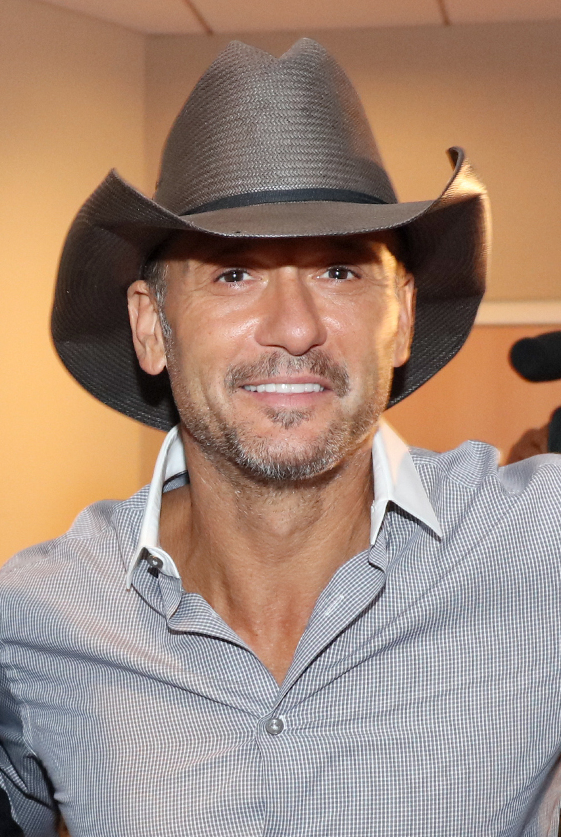
2026 recipients Hardy, Eric Church, Morgan Wallen, Tim McGraw
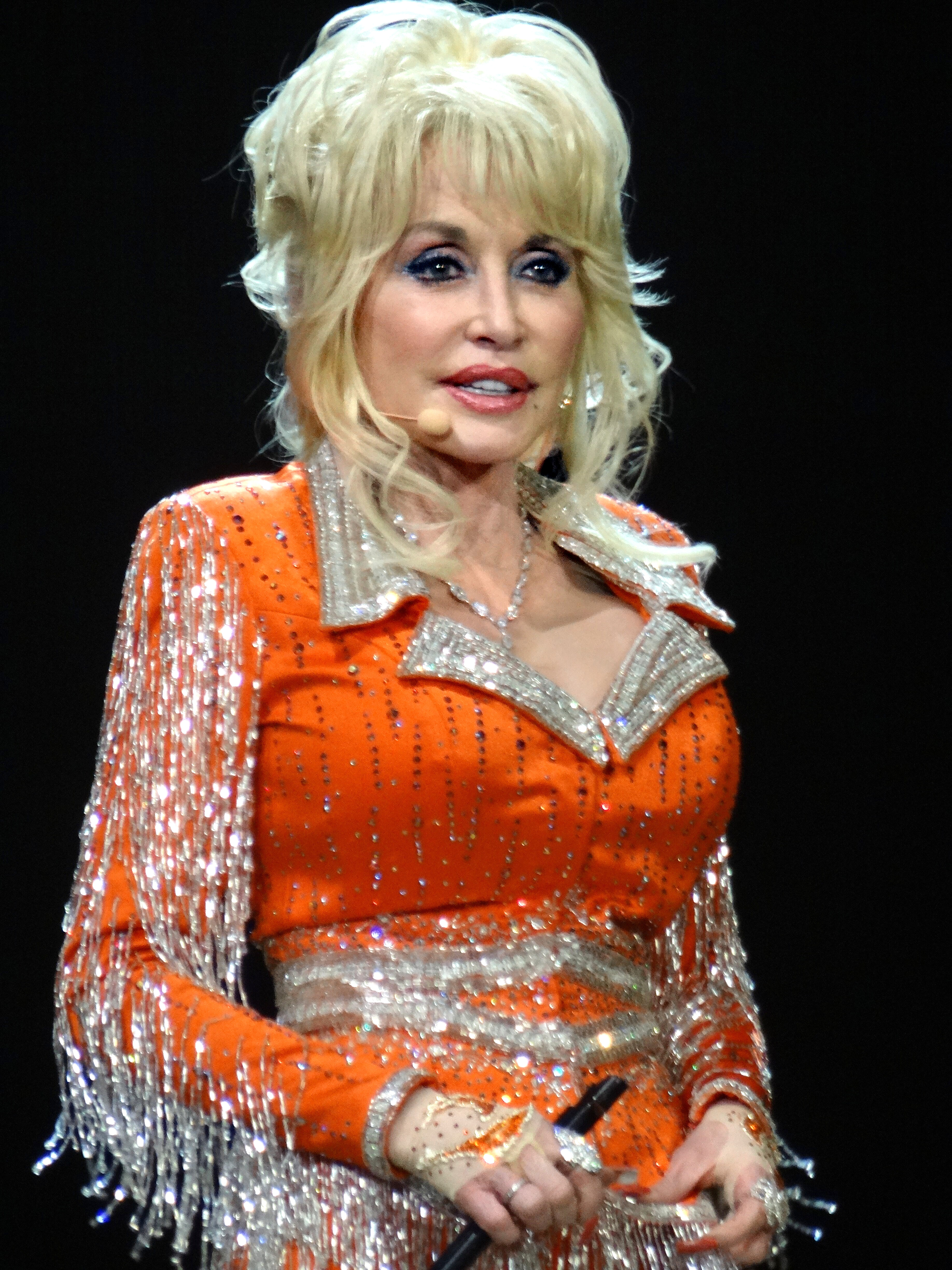
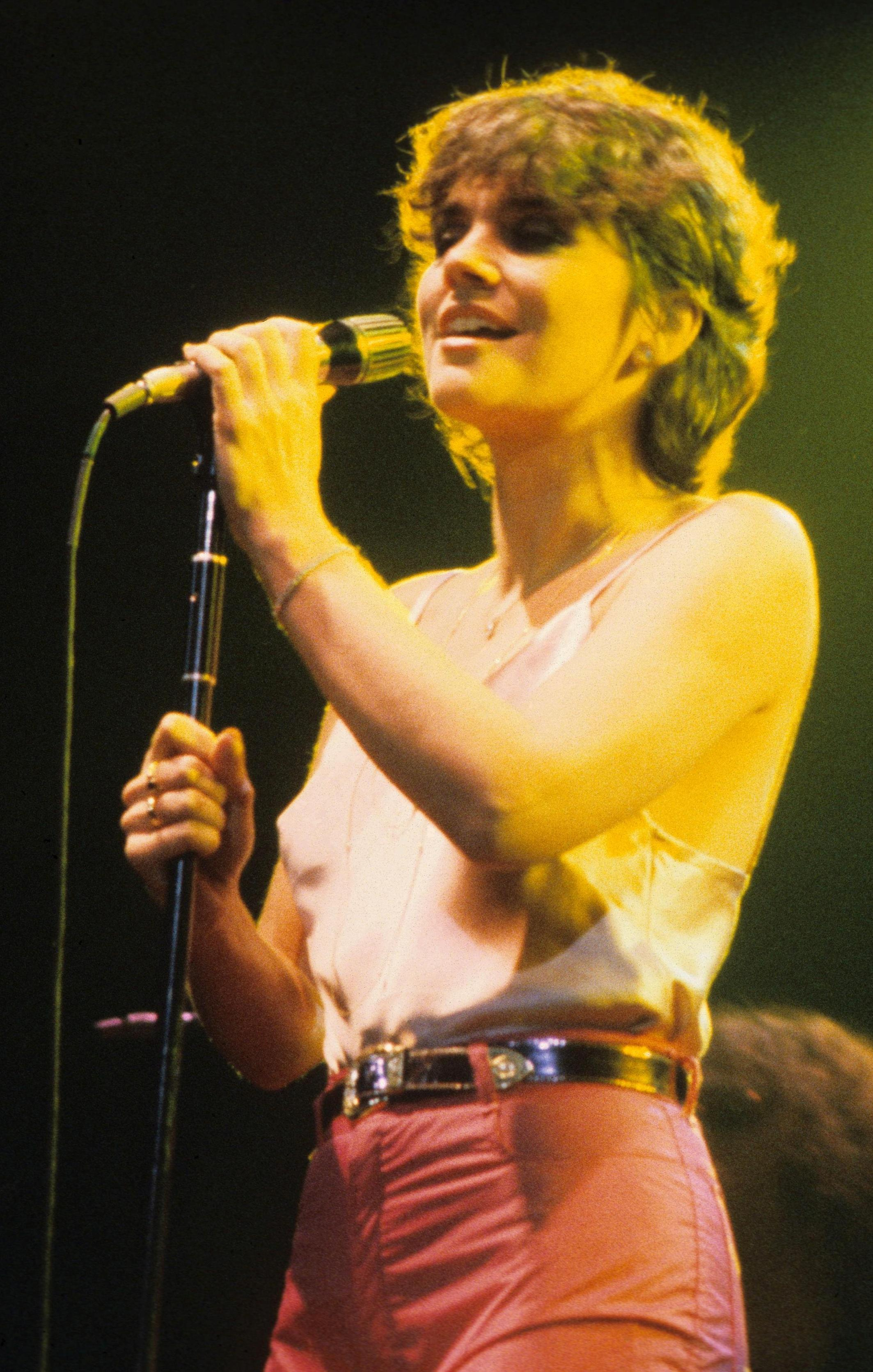
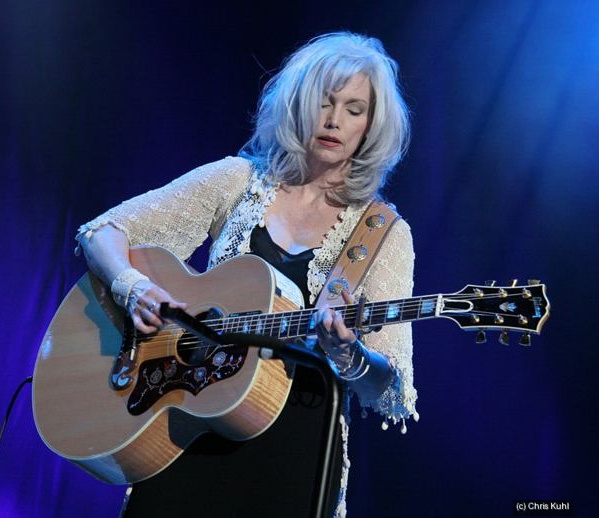
Inaugural recipients Dolly Parton, Linda Ronstadt and Emmylou Harris won for their iconic Trio album. Parton also has two additional wins in the category.

Year	Winner	Work	Nominees
2026	Hardy; Eric Church; Morgan Wallen; Tim McGraw	“McArthur”	Miranda Lambert and Chris Stapleton — “A Song To Sing"; Kacey Musgraves ft. Miranda Lambert — “Horses and Divorces”; Ella Langley and Morgan Wallen — “I Can’t Love You Anymore”; Carly Pearce and Riley Green — “If I Don’t Leave I’m Gonna Stay”
2025	Post Malone; Blake Shelton	“Pour Me A Drink”	Riley Green ft. Ella Langley — “Don't Mind If I Do”; Brandon Lake with Jelly Roll — “Hard Fought Hallelujah”; Cody Johnson and Carrie Underwood — “I'm Gonna Love You”; Megan Moroney ft. Kenny Chesney — “You Had to Be There”
2024	Ella Langley; Riley Green	"You Look Like You Love Me"	Kelsea Ballerini with Noah Kahan — "Cowboys Cry Too"; Post Malone ft. Morgan Wallen — “I Had Some Help”; Zach Bryan ft. Kacey Musgraves) — “I Remember Everything”; Morgan Wallen ft. Eric Church — “Man Made a Bar”
2023	Hardy; Lainey Wilson	"Wait in the Truck"	Jelly Roll ft. Lainey Wilson — "Save Me"; Cole Swindell ft. Jo Dee Messina — "She Had Me at Heads Carolina (Remix)"; Kane Brown ft. Katelyn Brown — "Thank God"; Carly Pearce ft. Chris Stapleton — "We Don't Fight Anymore"
2022	Carly Pearce; Ashley McBryde	"Never Wanted to Be That Girl"	Dierks Bentley ft. Breland and Hardy — "Beers on Me"; Jason Aldean ft. Carrie Underwood — If I Didn't Love You; Midland ft. Jon Pardi — "Longneck Way to Go"; Cole Swindell ft. Lainey Wilson — "Never Say Never"
2021	Kelsea Ballerini; Kenny Chesney	"Half of My Hometown"	Jordan Davis ft. Luke Bryan — "Buy Dirt"; Ryan Hurd and Maren Morris — "Chasing After You"; Elle King ft. Miranda Lambert — "Drunk (And I Don't Wanna Go Home)"; Chris Young ft. Kane Brown — "Famous Friends"
2020	Carly Pearce; Lee Brice	"I Hope You're Happy Now"	Dan + Shay ft. Justin Bieber — "10,000 Hours"; Thomas Rhett ft. Reba McEntire, Hillary Scott, Chris Tomlin and Keith Urban — "Be a Light"; Maren Morris ft. Hozier — "The Bones"; Miranda Lambert ft. Caylee Hammack, Elle King, Ashley McBryde, Maren Morris and Tenille Townes — "Fooled Around and Fell in Love"
2019	Lil Nas X Billy Ray Cyrus	"Old Town Road"	Brooks & Dunn ft. Luke Combs — "Brand New Man"; Garth Brooks ft. Blake Shelton — "Dive Bar"; Brantley Gilbert ft. Lindsay Ell — "What Happens in a Small Town"; Maren Morris ft. Brothers Osborne — "All My Favorite People"
2018	David Lee Murphy; Kenny Chesney	"Everything's Gonna Be Alright"	Jason Aldean ft. Miranda Lambert — "Drowns the Whiskey"; Dierks Bentley ft. Brothers Osborne — "Burning Man"; Maren Morris ft. Vince Gill — "Dear Hate"; Bebe Rexha ft. Florida Georgia Line — "Meant to Be"
2017	Glen Campbell; Willie Nelson	"Funny How Time Slips Away"	Kenny Chesney ft. Pink — "Setting the World on Fire"; Eric Church ft. Rhiannon Giddens — "Kill a Word"; Tim McGraw and Faith Hill — "Speak to a Girl"; Thomas Rhett ft. Maren Morris — "Craving You"
2016	Dierks Bentley; Elle King	"Different for Girls"	Luke Bryan ft. Karen Fairchild — "Home Alone Tonight"; Morgane Stapleton ft. Chris Stapleton — "You Are My Sunshine"; Keith Urban ft. Carrie Underwood — "The Fighter"; Chris Young ft. Cassadee Pope — "Think of You"
2015	Keith Urban; Eric Church	"Raise 'Em Up"	Kenny Chesney ft. Grace Potter — "Wild Child"; Willie Nelson and Merle Haggard — "Django and Jimmie"; Miranda Lambert ft. Little Big Town — "Smokin' and Drinkin'"; Blake Shelton ft. Ashley Monroe — "Lonely Tonight"
2014	Keith Urban; Miranda Lambert	"We Were Us"	Vince Gill and Paul Franklin — "Bakersfield"; Miranda Lambert ft. Carrie Underwood — "Somethin' Bad"; Tim McGraw ft. Faith Hill — "Meanwhile Back at Mama's"; Kenny Rogers ft. Dolly Parton — "You Can't Make Old Friends"
2013	Tim McGraw; Taylor Swift; Keith Urban	"Highway Don't Care"	Jason Aldean ft. Luke Bryan and Eric Church — "The Only Way I Know"; Kelly Clarkson ft. Vince Gill — "Don't Rush"; Blake Shelton ft. Pistol Annies — "Boys 'Round Here"; Florida Georgia Line ft. Nelly — "Cruise"
2012	Kenny Chesney; Tim McGraw	"Feel Like a Rock Star"	Alan Jackson ft. Zac Brown — "Dixie Highway"; Willie Nelson ft. Snoop Dogg, Kris Kristofferson and Jamey Johnson — "Roll Me Up and Smoke Me When I Die"; Lionel Richie ft. Darius Rucker — "Stuck on You"; Taylor Swift ft. The Civil Wars — "Safe & Sound"
2011	Jason Aldean; Kelly Clarkson	"Don't You Wanna Stay"	Kenny Chesney ft. Grace Potter — "You and Tequila"; Loretta Lynn ft. Sheryl Crow and Miranda Lambert — "Coal Miner's Daughter"; Brad Paisley ft. Alabama — "Old Alabama"; Zac Brown Band ft. Alan Jackson — "As She's Walking Away"
2010	Blake Shelton; Trace Adkins	"Hillbilly Bone"	Dierks Bentley ft. Miranda Lambert and Jamey Johnson — "Bad Angel"; Kenny Chesney ft. Dave Matthews — "I'm Alive"; Alan Jackson ft. Lee Ann Womack — "Till the End"; Zac Brown Band ft. Kid Rock — "Can't You See"
2009	Brad Paisley; Keith Urban	"Start a Band"	Brooks & Dunn ft. Reba McEntire — "Cowgirls Don't Cry"; Kenny Chesney ft. Mac McAnally — "Down the Road"; The Raconteurs ft. Ricky Skaggs and Ashley Monroe — "Old Enough"; Carrie Underwood ft. Randy Travis — "I Told You So"; Lee Ann Womack ft. George Strait — "Everything but Quits"
2008	Alison Krauss; Robert Plant	"Gone Gone Gone (Done Moved On)"	Kenny Chesney ft. George Strait — "Shiftwork"; Reba McEntire ft. Kenny Chesney — "Every Other Weekend"; Sugarland ft. Jake Owen and Little Big Town — "Life in a Northern Town"; Josh Turner ft. Trisha Yearwood — "Another Try"
2007	Tracy Lawrence; Tim McGraw; Kenny Chesney	"Find Out Who Your Friends Are"	Jimmy Buffett ft. Alan Jackson and George Strait — "Hey, Good Lookin' (Live)"; Vince Gill ft. Alison Krauss — "The Reason Why"; Alison Krauss ft. John Waite — "Missing You"; Reba McEntire ft. Kelly Clarkson — "Because of You"
2006	Brad Paisley; Dolly Parton	"When I Get Where I'm Going"	Bon Jovi ft. Jennifer Nettles — "Who Says You Can't Go Home"; Brooks & Dunn ft. Sheryl Crow and Vince Gill — "Building Bridges"; Faith Hill ft. Tim McGraw — "Like We Never Loved at All"; Gretchen Wilson ft. Merle Haggard — "Politically Uncorrect"
2005	George Strait; Lee Ann Womack	"Good News, Bad News"	Jimmy Buffett ft. Martina McBride — "Trip Around the Sun"; Willie Nelson ft. Lee Ann Womack — "I'll Never Be Free"; Brad Paisley ft. Sara Evans — "New Again"; Shania Twain ft. Billy Currington — "Party for Two"
2004	Brad Paisley; Alison Krauss	"Whiskey Lullaby"	Kenny Chesney ft. Uncle Kracker — "When the Sun Goes Down"; Jimmy Buffett ft. Clint Black, Kenny Chesney, Alan Jackson, Toby Keith and George Strait — "Hey, Good Lookin'"; Norah Jones ft. Dolly Parton — "Creepin' In"; James Taylor ft. Alison Krauss — "How's the World Treating You"
2003	Alan Jackson; Jimmy Buffett	"It's Five O'Clock Somewhere"	Tracy Byrd ft. Andy Griggs, Montgomery Gentry and Blake Shelton — "The Truth About Men"; Toby Keith ft. Willie Nelson — "Beer for My Horses"; Kid Rock ft. Sheryl Crow — "Picture"; Nitty Gritty Dirt Band ft. Johnny Cash — "Tears in the Holston River"
2002	Willie Nelson; Lee Ann Womack	"Mendocino County Line"	Garth Brooks ft. George Jones — "Beer Run"; Alan Jackson ft. George Strait — "Designated Drinker"; Alison Krauss ft. Gillian Welch — "I'll Fly Away"; Jo Dee Messina ft. Tim McGraw — "Bring On the Rain"
2001	Brad Paisley; Buck Owens; Bill Anderson; George Jones	"Too Country"	Alison Krauss ft. Gillian Welch — "I'll Fly Away"; Brad Paisley ft. Chely Wright — "Hard to be a Husband/Hard to be a Wife"; Gillian Welch ft. Alison Krauss and Emmylou Harris — "Didn't Leave Nobody but the Baby"; Dwight Yoakam ft. Buck Owens — "Alright, I'm Wrong"
2000	Alan Jackson; George Strait	"Murder on Music Row"	Asleep at the Wheel ft. Dixie Chicks — "Roly Poly"; Clint Black ft. Lisa Hartman Black — "When I Said I Do"; Faith Hill ft. Tim McGraw — "Let's Make Love"; Lee Ann Womack ft. Sons of the Desert — "I Hope You Dance"
1999	Vince Gill; Patty Loveless	"My Kind of Woman/My Kind of Man"	Sara Evans ft. Vince Gill — "No Place That Far"; Waylon Jennings ft. Mel Tillis, Bobby Bare and Jerry Reed — "Old Dogs"; Dolly Parton, Linda Ronstadt and Emmylou Harris — "Trio II"
1998	Patty Loveless; George Jones	"You Don't Seem to Miss Me"	Marty Stuart ft. Clint Black, Joe Diffie, Merle Haggard, Emmylou Harris, Alison Krauss, Patty Loveless, Earl Scruggs, Ricky Skaggs, Pam Tillis, Randy Travis, Travis Tritt and Dwight Yoakam — "Same Old Train"; Brooks & Dunn ft. Reba McEntire — "If You See Him/If You See Her"; Garth Brooks ft. Trisha Yearwood — "In Another's Eyes"; Anita Cochran ft. Steve Wariner — "What If I Said"; Faith Hill ft. Tim McGraw — "Just to Hear You Say That You Love Me"
1997	Tim McGraw; Faith Hill	"It's Your Love"	Clint Black ft. Martina McBride — "Still Holding On"; Charlie Daniels ft. John Berry and Hal Ketchum — "Long Haired Country Boy"; Kathy Mattea ft. George Jones — "You've Got a Friend in Me"; Lee Roy Parnell ft. The Fairfield Four — "John the Revelator"
1996	Dolly Parton; Vince Gill	"I Will Always Love You"	Jeff Foxworthy ft. Alan Jackson — "Redneck Games"; George Jones ft. Tammy Wynette — "One"; Reba McEntire ft. Martina McBride, Linda Davis and Trisha Yearwood — "On My Own"; Marty Stuart ft. Travis Tritt — "Honky Tonkin's What I Do Best"
1995	Alison Krauss; Shenandoah	"Somewhere in the Vicinity of the Heart"	Suzy Bogguss ft. Chet Atkins — "Sorry Seems to Be the Hardest Word"; George Jones ft. Alan Jackson — "A Good Year for the Roses"; George Jones ft. Tammy Wynette — "One"; Lee Roy Parnell ft. Steve Wariner and Diamond Rio — "Workin' Man Blues"
1994	Reba McEntire; Linda Davis	"Does He Love You"	Mark O'Connor ft. Charlie Daniels, Travis Tritt, Marty Stuart and Johnny Cash — "The Devil Comes Back to Georgia"; Conway Twitty ft. Sam Moore — "Rainy Night in Georgia"; Tammy Wynette, Loretta Lynn and Dolly Parton — "Honky Tonk Angels"; Trisha Yearwood ft. Aaron Neville — "I Fall to Pieces"
1993	George Jones; Vince Gill; Mark Chesnutt; Garth Brooks; Travis Tritt; Joe Diffie; Alan Jackson; Pam Tillis; T. Graham Brown; Patty Loveless; Clint Black	"I Don't Need Your Rockin' Chair"	Clint Black ft. Wynonna Judd — "A Bad Goodbye"; Reba McEntire ft. Vince Gill — "The Heart Won't Lie"; Tanya Tucker ft. Delbert McClinton — "Tell Me About It"; Trisha Yearwood ft. Don Henley — "Walkaway Joe"
1992	Marty Stuart; Travis Tritt	"This One's Gonna Hurt You (For a Long, Long Time)"	Clint Black ft. Roy Rogers — "Hold On Partner"; James McMurtry ft. Dwight Yoakam, John Prine, Joe Ely and John Mellencamp — "Buzzin' Cousins"; Randy Travis ft. Tammy Wynette — "We're Strangers Again"; Keith Whitley ft. Earl Thomas Conley — "Brotherly Love"
1991	Mark O'Connor; Vince Gill; Ricky Skaggs; Steve Wariner	"Restless"	Chet Atkins ft. Mark Knopfler — "Poor Boy Blues"; The Highwaymen — "Highwayman 2"; Dolly Parton ft. Ricky Van Shelton — "Rockin' Years"; Randy Travis ft. George Jones — "A Few Ole Country Boys"
1990	Keith Whitley; Lorrie Morgan	"'Til a Tear Becomes a Rose"	Emmylou Harris ft. Willie Nelson — "Gulf Coast Highway"; Reba McEntire ft. Vince Gill — "Oklahoma Swing"; The Highwaymen — "Highwayman 2"; Tanya Tucker ft. T. Graham Brown — "Don't Go Out"
1989	Hank Williams; Hank Williams Jr.	"There's a Tear in My Beer"	Johnny Cash ft. Rosanne Cash and The Everly Brothers — "Ballad of a Teenage Queen"; John Denver ft. Nitty Gritty Dirt Band — "And So It Goes"; Buck Owens ft. Ringo Starr — "Act Naturally"; Hank Williams Jr. ft. Johnny Cash — "That Old Wheel"
1988	Dolly Parton; Linda Ronstadt; Emmylou Harris	"Trio"	Rodney Crowell ft.Rosanne Cash — "It's Such a Small World; Emmylou Harris ft. Earl Thomas Conley — "We Believe in Happy Endings"; Tanya Tucker ft. Paul Davis and Paul Overstreet — "I Won't Take Less Than Your Love"; Dwight Yoakam ft. Buck Owens — "Streets of Bakersfield"

== Artists with multiple wins ==
Artists that received multiple awards
Awards	Artist
5	Tim McGraw
4	Brad Paisley
4	Keith Urban
4	Kenny Chesney
4	Vince Gill
3	Alan Jackson
3	Alison Krauss
3	Dolly Parton
3	George Jones
3	Patty Loveless
2	Blake Shelton
2	Carly Pearce
2	George Strait
2	Lee Ann Womack
2	Travis Tritt
2	Willie Nelson
2	Eric Church
2	Hardy

== Artists with multiple nominations ==
14 nominations

- Kenny Chesney

12 nominations

- Vince Gill

11 nominations

- Alan Jackson
- Miranda Lambert (Note: Including one as a member of Pistol Annies.)
- Tim McGraw

10 nominations

- Alison Krauss

9 nominations

- George Jones
- Reba McEntire
- Willie Nelson

8 nominations

- Dolly Parton

7 nominations

- Brad Paisley
- Clint Black
- George Strait

6 nominations

- Blake Shelton
- Emmylou Harris
- Faith Hill
- Johnny Cash (Note: Including two as a member of The Highwaymen.)
- Keith Urban
- Lee Ann Womack
- Maren Morris

5 nominations

- Carrie Underwood
- Travis Tritt
- Trisha Yearwood

4 nominations

- Brooks & Dunn
- Buck Owens
- Carly Pearce
- Dierks Bentley
- Dwight Yoakam
- Eric Church
- Garth Brooks
- Jason Aldean
- Jimmy Buffett
- Linda Ronstadt
- Marty Stuart
- Morgan Wallen
- Patty Loveless
- Randy Travis
- Tammy Wynette

3 nominations

- Ashley Monroe (Note: Including one as a member of Pistol Annies.)
- Chris Stapleton
- Ella Langley
- Elle King
- Gillian Welch
- Hardy
- Karen Fairchild (Note: Including two as a member of Little Big Town.)
- Kelly Clarkson
- Kris Kristofferson (Note: Including two as a member of The Highwaymen.)
- Lainey Wilson
- Luke Bryan
- Martina McBride
- Merle Haggard
- Ricky Skaggs
- Riley Green
- Sheryl Crow
- Steve Wariner
- Tanya Tucker
- Waylon Jennings (Note: Including two as a member of The Highwaymen.)
- Zac Brown (Note: Including two as a member of Zac Brown Band.)

2 nominations

- Ashley McBryde
- Brothers Osborne
- Charlie Daniels
- Chet Atkins
- Chris Young
- Cole Swindell
- Earl Thomas Conley
- Florida Georgia Line
- Grace Potter
- Hank Williams Jr.
- Jamey Johnson
- Jelly Roll
- Jennifer Nettles (Note: Including one as a member of Sugarland.)
- Jo Dee Messina
- Joe Diffie
- Kane Brown
- Kacey Musgraves
- Keith Whitley
- Kid Rock
- Lee Roy Parnell
- Linda Davis
- Little Big Town
- Loretta Lynn
- Nitty Gritty Dirt Band
- Mark O'Connor
- Pam Tillis
- Post Malone
- Rosanne Cash
- Sara Evans
- T. Graham Brown
- Taylor Swift
- Thomas Rhett
- Toby Keith
- Zac Brown Band
