= Truck on Fire =

Single by Carly Pearce

from the album Hummingbird
- Released: July 29, 2024
- Genre: Country
- Length: 3:08
- Label: Big Machine
- Songwriters: Carly Pearce; Justin Ebach; Charles Kelley
- Producers: Shane McAnally; Josh Osborne; Carly Pearce

Carly Pearce singles chronology
| "We Don't Fight Anymore" (2023) | "Truck on Fire" (2024) | "Dream Come True" (2025) |

Music video
- Truck on Fire on YouTube

"Truck on Fire" is a song by American country music singer Carly Pearce. It was released on July 29, 2024, as the second single from her fourth studio album, Hummingbird. Pearce co-wrote the song with Justin Ebach and Lady A's Charles Kelley, and co-produced it with Shane McAnally and Josh Osborne.

== Content ==
Pearce, who co-wrote the song with Justin Ebach and Charles Kelley of Lady A, described the song as an empowered anthem for women who've experienced heartbreak, saying: "No one wants to be cheated on, but everyone wants to seek revenge. I wrote this song for every girl who has gone through a similar situation and dreams of wreaking havoc on her ex".

== Music video ==
The music video for "Truck on Fire" premiered on October 14, 2024. In it, Pearce is shown driving a red convertible Ford Mustang to a rural gas station and buying the supplies needed to commit arson on her exes' pickup truck, which leads the police to go looking for her. Pearce recruited longtime collaborator Alexa Campbell to direct the video, and described the process of making the video as "show[ing] a different side of [her] personality, a more silly and fun side".

== Charts ==
Weekly chart performance for "Truck on Fire"
| Chart (2024–2025) | Peak position |
|---|---|
| US Country Airplay (Billboard) | 18 |
