= We Don't Fight Anymore =

Single by Carly Pearce featuring Chris Stapleton

from the album Hummingbird
- Released: June 16, 2023
- Recorded: November 15, 2022
- Studio: Sound Emporium (Nashville, Tennessee)
- Genre: Bluegrass; country
- Length: 3:40
- Label: Big Machine
- Songwriters: Pete Good; Shane McAnally; Carly Pearce
- Producers: Shane McAnally; Josh Osborne; Carly Pearce

Carly Pearce singles chronology
"What He Didn't Do" (2022)	"We Don't Fight Anymore" (2023)	"Truck on Fire" (2024)

Chris Stapleton singles chronology
"Joy of My Life" (2022)	"We Don't Fight Anymore" (2023)	"White Horse" (2023)

"We Don't Fight Anymore" is a song by American country music artist Carly Pearce. It was co-written by Pearce, along with Pete Good and Shane McAnally. It was released in June 2023 as the lead single from Pearce's fourth studio album Hummingbird. The song describes a failing relationship and received critical acclaim following its release. Chris Stapleton provides harmony vocals on the track.

== Background, composition content ==
Carly Pearce first found commercial success with her 2017 single "Every Little Thing". Her career further elevated with the 2021 studio album 29: Written in Stone. The project was considered a more personal and reflective effort. In the wake of its success came the release of the song "We Don't Fight Anymore". Pearce co-wrote the song with Pete Good and Shane McAnally. Although none of the writers were experiencing any relationship problems, they all drew from experiences with past relationships to write "We Don't Fight Anymore". The song's lyrics center on a relationship whose communication is failing between both partners.

Discussing the song in a statement, Pearce explained “This song embodies a place that I think, if we are honest with ourselves, we’ve all felt at some point in a relationship. The distance that feels heartbreaking, yet you’re also indifferent. I’ve always been a writer who never wanted to shy away from the ‘uncomfortable’ moments in all of our lives, and this song feels too important not to share. Having Chris Stapleton join me on this song was a dream come true and he unlocked an element to the story that I didn’t even know it needed.”

== Recording ==
Pearce and her team at Big Machine Records believed the song to be a commercial success. This led to the instrumentation tracks being recorded on November 15, 2022, at the Sound Emporium Studios, located in Nashville, Tennessee. The song was produced by Shane McAnally, Josh Osborne and Pearce herself. "We Don't Fight Anymore" was the first song featuring production credits from Pearce herself.

Pearce was finishing up her vocals for the song when she thought of including Chris Stapleton on the track. Stapleton was a professional Nashville songwriter before critical acclaim brought him to the attention of record buyers with 2015's Traveller. From there, his commercial success was elevated by several more albums and chart-topping country singles like 2017's "Broken Halos". Pearce sent a message to Stapleton's wife Morgane via Instagram about the song. Morgane brought the song to her husband who liked the track enough to agree to record it.

== Critical reception ==
"We Don't Fight Anymore" has received positive reception from critics. Jon Freeman of Rolling Stone called the lyrics "devastating" and "laden with sadness". Billy Dukes from Taste of Country found the vocals to be alluring but especially believed the songwriting to be the driving force behind the song. Lydia Farthing of Holler Country commented that "it feels like a stronger breath of confidence and strength from the Kentucky-born entertainer." Tom Roland of Billboard predicted that the song could be a potential "contender" for a Grammy award, highlighting its emotion: "If a song could make bones ache, 'We Don’t Fight Anymore' would do it. The song did ultimately received a nomination for Best Country Duo/Group Performance at the 66th Annual Grammy Awards. It was also nominated for Musical Event of the Year at the 57th Annual Country Music Association Awards.

== Release and chart performance ==
"We Don't Fight Anymore" was officially released on June 16, 2023, via Big Machine Records. It impacted country music radio on June 20, receiving 95 adds from stations within its first week. The song became Pearce's highest add date in her career. "Thank you for this, I’m so grateful & honestly blown away," Pearce wrote on her Instagram.

== Music video ==
The music video for the track was released on September 6, 2023 and stars Lucy Hale and Shiloh Fernandez. The project is a reunion for Pearce and Hale, as Pearce had worked as her backing singer while she was promoting her 2014 debut album Road Between. Directed by Alexa Campbell, it depicts Hale and Fernandez as a couple who are trapped in a state of emotional disconnection, interspersed with clips of Pearce singing the song on the floor of a room surrounded by candles. Their house later sets on fire, paralleling their crumbling relationship. Fernandez leaves without Hale, who has to escape on her own by climbing out of the window, and the video concludes with them standing outside together watching as their house burns.

== Charts ==
=== Weekly charts ===
Weekly chart performance for "We Don't Fight Anymore"
Chart (2023–2024)	Peak position
Canada Country (Billboard)	35
UK Country Airplay (Radiomonitor)	19
US Billboard Hot 100	67
US Country Airplay (Billboard)	9
US Hot Country Songs (Billboard)	19

=== Year-end charts ===
2024 year-end chart performance for "We Don't Fight Anymore"
Chart (2024)	Position
US Country Airplay (Billboard)	28
US Hot Country Songs (Billboard)	31

== Certifications ==
Certifications for "We Don't Fight Anymore"
Region	Certification	Certified units/sales
United States (RIAA)	Platinum	1,000,000^{‡}
^{‡} Sales+streaming figures based on certification alone.
