= Hide the Wine =

Single by Carly Pearce

from the album Every Little Thing
- Released: December 4, 2017
- Genre: Country
- Length: 3:28
- Label: Big Machine
- Songwriters: Ashley Gorley; Luke Laird; Hillary Lindsey
- Producer: busbee

Carly Pearce singles chronology
"Every Little Thing" (2017)	"Hide the Wine" (2017)	"Closer to You" (2018)

"Hide the Wine" is a song recorded by American country music singer Carly Pearce. It was released in December 2017 as the second and final single from her debut studio album, Every Little Thing. The song was written by Ashley Gorley, Luke Laird and Hillary Lindsey.

== Content ==
Pearce said that she wanted to record the song before she even had a record contract, and was able to record it after another artist had declined it. She said that she wanted it to be the second single to stand as a contrast from the slower "Every Little Thing". The song is about "having a little too much to drink and then calling an old flame that you probably shouldn't".

In October 2018, Pearce revealed that Little Big Town had recorded the song in 2017, but chose not to include it on an album.

== Commercial performance ==
The song has sold 102,000 copies in the United States as of October 2018.

== Charts ==
=== Weekly charts ===
Chart (2017–2018)	Peak position
Canada Country (Billboard)	13
US Bubbling Under Hot 100 (Billboard)	7
US Country Airplay (Billboard)	13
US Hot Country Songs (Billboard)	21

=== Year-end charts ===
Chart (2018)	Position
US Country Airplay (Billboard)	52
US Hot Country Songs (Billboard)	61

== Certifications ==
Region	Certification	Certified units/sales
Canada (Music Canada)	Gold	40,000^{‡}
United States (RIAA)	Gold	500,000^{‡}
^{‡} Sales+streaming figures based on certification alone.
