= 29 (EP) =

EP by Carly Pearce
- Released: February 19, 2021
- Genre: Country
- Length: 22:14
- Label: Big Machine
- Producers: Shane McAnally; Josh Osborne; Jimmy Robbins

Carly Pearce chronology
Carly Pearce (2020)	29 (2021)	29: Written in Stone (2021)

Singles from 29
- 1. "Next Girl" Released: September 4, 2020

29 is an extended play by American country music artist Carly Pearce. It was released on February 19, 2021, via Big Machine Records and contains seven tracks. The project was co-produced by Shane McAnally, Josh Osborne and Jimmy Robbins. It is third music collection released in Pearce's career and her first extended play effort. Its lead single, "Next Girl", has become a charting country single since its release in 2020.

29 was nominated for the Country Music Association Award for Album of the Year at the 55th Annual Country Music Association Awards in 2021.

== Background ==
In 2017, Carly Pearce had her first hit with the single "Every Little Thing". The track was produced by Pearce's musical collaborator, busbee, who died in 2019. In addition, Pearce would divorce husband, Michael Ray, in 2020. Both personal setbacks prompted Pearce to compose material and create a new music project. "In that grief, I started swimming to save myself from the sadness, then realized I've found something even deeper," she recalled. According to an interview with Rolling Stone, a new album collection was necessary especially since her previous release was about the idea of falling in love and happiness.

Pearce found she had a significant amount of time to devote to the making of 29. Following her divorce and staying home due to the COVID-19 pandemic, she was inspired to create the album. "Quarantine has been good to me," she commented in 2020. The album's name was derived from Pearce's age at the time of her deciding to create the album. In an interview with Billboard, Pearce explained that she did not choose to do a "themed album by any means". Instead, she found that the record came from experiences shaped during her 29th year.

== Content and recording ==
29 was co-produced by Shane McAnally, Josh Osborne and Jimmy Robbins. All three producers also contributed to the several songs on the album. It was her first production project with the producers since the death of busbee. Pearce and her production collaborators had a shared appreciation for "Nineties country music" and wanted to make an album centered around that particular sound. Particular instruments that evoked that era of country music were chosen for the project, such as dobro and fiddle. Music artists of that decade were also an influence on the record, including Patty Loveless, Reba McEntire and Lee Ann Womack.

According to Pearce's, all of the album's material was autobiographical. "I wrote what I lived," she told People magazine. Much of the album's material was inspired by her divorce from Michael Ray. The album's title track was about how her plans by age 29 were unfulfilled and features heavy fiddle instrumentation. The final track, "Day One", describes the feelings associated with Pearce's first day being alone following her divorce. The song, "Messy", reflected her decision to move past her previous relationship. "Show Me Around" was dedicated to her now-deceased producer and friend. Pearce described the track "Liability" as a song that is "all about the lies we tell ourselves".

== Critical reception ==
Professional ratings
Review scores
Source	Rating
Allmusic	3.5/5 stars
Entertainment Focus	5/5 stars

29 has received positive reviews from critics since its release. Rolling Stone praised several of its tracks, including "Next Girl", which Jon Freeman called "a spicy, uptempo warning about a guy who knows 'how to say all the right things'." Freeman highlighted the album's title track as a "devastating centerpiece", also noting that 29 had a progression that can be followed through the course of the record: "Ultimately, there's a progression through the seven tracks, concluding in a place of hope—the realistic, clear-eyed kind—after some heavy-duty trials." Tricia Despres of American Songwriter called 29 an "exquisite seven song collection continues to lift more of the black veil off of one of the most life-altering periods of Pearce’s life."

British publication Entertainment Focus awarded the album five out of five stars in their review. Pip Ellwood-Hughes called 29 "pure gold", highlighting tracks such as "Next Girl" and "Should've Known Better". Ellwood-Hughes compared the title track to that of The Chicks' single, "Wide Open Spaces". Overall, he concluded that "29 was no doubt a painful project to record and pull together, but it’s a stunning collection from an artist at the very top of her game." Jerrett Franklin of Nashville Music Reviews gave the EP positive reception as well. He called the project "a strong release" and its material to be "absolutely stunning." Franklin concluded by saying, "The entire EP takes you on a journey. Carly Pearce does a great job at showcasing her emotion through the song and making the listeners feel exactly what she felt."

Off the Record UK described 29 as "stunningly vulnerable and raw project" in the opening of their review. Writers praised the depth and quality of Pearce's songwriting, commenting that her writing style has matured significantly. The publication concluded saying, "It is a flawless, poised and gracious account of heartbreak in all its forms and sets out a new chapter both for Pearce in her professional and personal life. The next chapter looks incredibly bright, and above all powerful and authentic." Stephen Thomas Erlewine of Allmusic gave the project three and a half stars. He found Pearce's songwriting to be "too on-the-nose," but appreciated her honesty as a vocalist: "...her vulnerability is endearing, and the craftsmanship, aided by producers Shane McAnally and Josh Osborne, is sturdy, so the music retains its appeal even after the stories become familiar."

== Release and chart performance ==
29 was released to digital and streaming sites on February 19, 2021, via Big Machine Records. The project's lead single, "Next Girl", was released at midnight on September 4, 2020. Going for adds at country radio on September 28, "Next Girl" received 57 radio ads from country music stations around the United States. The song has since reached the top 40 of the Billboard's Hot Country Songs and Country Airplay charts. 29 became Pearce's third release to reach the Billboard Top Country Albums chart, peaking in the top 10. It also became her third to make the Billboard 200 list, where it reached the top 100 and spent two weeks on the chart.

== Track listing ==
All tracks are written by Carly Pearce, with additional co-writers as noted.

29 track listing
No.	Title	Writer(s)	Length
1.	"Next Girl"	Shane McAnally; Josh Osborne	2:44
2.	"Should've Known Better"	Jordan Reynolds; Emily Shackleton	3:01
3.	"29"	McAnally; Osborne	3:42
4.	"Liability"	McAnally; Osborne	2:44
5.	"Messy"	Sarah Buxton; Jimmy Robbins	2:53
6.	"Show Me Around"	Shackleton; Ben West	3:40
7.	"Day One"	McAnally; Osborne; Matthew Ramsey	3:30
Total length:			22:14

== Personnel ==
All credits for 29 are adapted from AllMusic.

Musical personnel

- Dave Cohen – keyboards, piano, synthesizer
- Fred Eltringham – drums, percussion, programming
- Jeneé Fleenor – fiddle
- Ryan Gore – programming
- Evan Hutchings – drums, percussion
- Josh Matheny – dobro, steel guitar
- Rob McNelley – electric guitar
- Josh Osborne – background vocals
- Carly Pearce – lead vocals, background vocals
- Jimmy Robbins – acoustic guitar, bass guitar, keyboards, programming
- Ilya Toshinsky – acoustic guitar, mandolin
- Derek Wells – banjo, electric guitar, steel guitar, mandolin
- Craig Young – bass guitar

Technical personnel

- Mike "Frog" Griffith – Production coordination
- Evan Hutchings – Recording
- Ted Jensen – Mastering engineer
- Scott Johnson – Production coordination
- Kam Luchterland – Assistant engineer
- Shane McAnally – Producer (all tracks except 5)
- Josh Osborne – Producer (all tracks except 5)
- Jimmy Robbins – Mixing, mixing engineer, producer (track 5), recording
- Chris Small – Editing
- Janice Soled – Production coordination
- Derek Wells – Recording
- Brian David Willis – Editing

== Charts ==
=== Weekly charts ===
Weekly chart performance for 29
Chart (2021)	Peak position
US Billboard 200	83
US Top Country Albums (Billboard)	9

=== Year-end charts ===
2021 year-end chart performance for 29
Chart (2021)	Position
US Top Country Albums (Billboard)	90

2023 year-end chart performance for 29
Chart (2023)	Position
US Top Country Albums (Billboard)	74

== Release history ==
Release history for 29
Region	Date	Format	Label	Ref.
United States	February 19, 2021	Digital download; streaming	Big Machine	
