= Dear Miss Loretta =

Promotional single by Carly Pearce featuring Patty Loveless

from the album 29: Written in Stone
- Released: August 3, 2021
- Genre: Country
- Length: 3:40
- Label: Big Machine
- Songwriters: Brandy Clark; Carly Pearce; Shane McAnally
- Producers: Shane McAnally; Josh Osborne

"Dear Miss Loretta" is a song recorded by American country music artist Carly Pearce and features Patty Loveless. It was released on August 3, 2021, as a promotional single from her third studio album 29: Written in Stone. Pearce co-wrote the song with Brandy Clark and Shane McAnally. The song is a tribute to pioneering country singer-songwriter Loretta Lynn, who died on October 4, 2022.

== Background ==
The song was released on August 3, 2021, to coincide with the album announcement. The track is framed as a discussion between Pearce and Loretta Lynn, with Pearce celebrating the honesty in Lynn's songwriting and the parallels between their lives in rural Appalachia. The song' chorus references one of Lynn's signature hits "Coal Miner's Daughter".

Loveless' inclusion on the track was not originally what Pearce had intended. When she performed the song on the Grand Ole Opry for the first time, Loveless happened to be watching the livestream at home and contacted her to express her appreciation. Pearce then invited her to appear on another track on the album but Loveless declined, stating that the song Pearce had pitched to her didn't feel right. Loveless then suggested "Dear Miss Loretta", as Pearce's performance of the song on the Opry had moved her. Loveless recorded her parts of the song with her husband and producer Emory Gordy Jr. and Pearce was shocked to find that she had contributed an entire verse, stating "she had sung way more than I ever thought in a million years she would and it was the greatest thing I have ever heard in my life."

Pearce thought it was fitting to include her "childhood idol" Loveless on the song because both artists come from Kentucky and share a deep affection for Lynn, who also comes from Kentucky. In an interview with Taste Of Country, Pearce expressed her appreciation for Loveless stating "to hear Patty Loveless sing your words, there’s no way to describe that sensation. Her voice is Appalachia, those mountains and hollers are country music. To think, a year ago, I was asking myself, ‘What would Patty Loveless do?’ thinking about all her songs, how smart and sassy she always was... and now she's on one of mine."

Discussing the genesis of the song and her admiration of Lynn, Pearce explained "I’ve always loved her, but it wasn’t until the last year that I really FELT what she’s sang about all these years— and just how much we really do have in common. Thank you Loretta Lynn for making me feel like it’s okay to write my truth and be unashamed just like you." The song references the similarities between Lynn's and Pearce's life, with Pearce comparing her divorce from Michael Ray to Lynn's turbulent relationship with her husband Doo.

== Live performances ==
Pearce debuted the song at the Grand Ole Opry on March 20, 2021. The day after Lynn's death on October 4, 2022, Pearce returned to the Opry to perform the song and played a voicemail she had received from Lynn telling her how much she loved it.

On August 25, 2021, Pearce performed the song at the 14th Academy of Country Music Honors to celebrate Lynn, who received the Poet's Award.

As a tribute to Lynn, Pearce performed the song on November 9, 2022, at the 56th Annual Country Music Association Awards with Ricky Skaggs, Sonya Isaacs and Jenee Fleenor.
