= Never Wanted to Be That Girl =

Single by Carly Pearce and Ashley McBryde

from the album 29: Written in Stone
- Released: September 15, 2021
- Genre: Country
- Length: 3:34
- Label: Big Machine
- Songwriters: Shane McAnally; Ashley McBryde; Carly Pearce
- Producers: Shane McAnally; Josh Osborne; Jimmy Robbins

Carly Pearce singles chronology
"Next Girl" (2020)	"Never Wanted to Be That Girl" (2021)	"What He Didn't Do" (2022)

Ashley McBryde singles chronology
"Martha Divine" (2020)	"Never Wanted to Be That Girl" (2021)	"Light On in the Kitchen" (2023)

Music video
- "Never Wanted to Be That Girl" on YouTube

"Never Wanted to Be That Girl" is a song recorded by American country music singer-songwriters Carly Pearce and Ashley McBryde. It was written by McBryde and Pearce, along with Shane McAnally. The track was released as the second single from Pearce's third studio album, 29: Written in Stone. The song has since reached number one on the Billboard Country Airplay chart and received critical attention from music critics. It received four nominations at the 56th Annual Country Music Association Awards, winning Musical Event of the Year, and won the Grammy Award for Best Country Duo/Group Performance at the 65th ceremony.

== Background and content ==
Pearce reached commercial success with charting country singles like "Every Little Thing", "I Hope You're Happy Now" and "Next Girl". Following several challenging personal struggles, she released her third studio album in 2021 titled 29: Written in Stone. The album's material reflects on Pearce's personal difficulties and includes "Never Wanted to Be That Girl". Pearce and McBryde composed the track together, along with Shane McAnally. It was also produced by McAnally, along with Josh Osborne and Jimmy Robbins. All three individuals also produced 29: Written in Stone.

The song tells the story of two women who realize they are in love with the same man. Pearce plays the role of a married woman, while McBryde plays the role of a mistress. Pearce explained that the song was not necessarily about her own personal challenges but instead could be about any woman's situation. "I think it’s a story that happens more times than people even want to admit. This should be looked at as two female artists coming together to write a truth that so many women live," she told Taste of Country.

== Critical reception ==
Jon Freeman of Rolling Stone described the track as "a top flight cheating song", comparing it to Linda Davis and Reba McEntire's duet hit "Does He Love You". Freeman also commented that it "ditches the campy melodrama for a bracing jolt of regret and clarity". Billy Dukes of Taste of Country called the tune "a tortured ballad" in his review. Dukes also noted comparisons to "Does He Love You", but also found the track had a maturity to it that was unlike Pearce's previous releases: "The soft, complicated emotions required to share this kind of vulnerability aren't the kind a 20-something is aware of. You need to have lived life and possibly even gone through a public divorce, as both McEntire and Pearce had prior to recording."

== Release ==
"Never Wanted to Be That Girl" was released as a single on September 15, 2021, two days prior to 29: Written in Stone. The album itself was then released on September 17, 2021. Both projects were distributed on Big Machine Records. The single received the most adds to radio station playlists in its first week of release. It had been since 2007's "Because of You" duet between Reba McEntire and Kelly Clarkson that a female duet received as many adds to radio.

== Chart performance ==
The track debuted at number 35 on the Billboard Country Airplay chart. It also charted on the Billboard Hot 100 and the Canadian Hot 100, peaking at numbers 63 and 59, respectively. The song reached the top of the Country Airplay chart dated May 14, 2022, becoming Pearce's third number one on that chart and McBryde's first.

== Charts ==
=== Weekly charts ===
Chart performance for "Never Wanted to Be That Girl"
Chart (2021–2022)	Peak position
Canada Hot 100 (Billboard)	59
Canada Country (Billboard)	1
US Billboard Hot 100	63
US Country Airplay (Billboard)	1
US Hot Country Songs (Billboard)	13

=== Year-end charts ===
2022 year-end chart performance for "Never Wanted to Be That Girl"
Chart (2022)	Position
US Country Airplay (Billboard)	26
US Hot Country Songs (Billboard)	43

== Certifications ==
Certifications for "Never Wanted to Be That Girl"
Region	Certification	Certified units/sales
Canada (Music Canada)	Platinum	80,000^{‡}
United States (RIAA)	Platinum	1,000,000^{‡}
^{‡} Sales+streaming figures based on certification alone.

== Accolades ==
Year	Organization	Award/work	Result
2022	Academy of Country Music Awards	Music Event of the Year	Won
2022	Academy of Country Music Awards	Music Video of the Year	Nominated
2022	Country Music Association Awards	Song of the Year	Nominated
2022	Country Music Association Awards	Single of the Year	Nominated
2022	Country Music Association Awards	Musical Event of the Year	Won
2022	Country Music Association Awards	Music Video of the Year	Nominated
2023	Grammy Awards	Best Country Duo/Group Performance	Won
