= What He Didn't Do =

Single by Carly Pearce

from the album 29: Written in Stone
- Released: June 13, 2022
- Genre: Country
- Length: 3:11
- Label: Big Machine
- Songwriters: Carly Pearce; Ashley Gorley; Emily Shackelton
- Producers: Shane McAnally; Josh Osborne

Carly Pearce singles chronology
"Never Wanted to Be That Girl" (2021)	"What He Didn't Do" (2022)	"We Don't Fight Anymore" (2023)

Music video
- What He Didn't Do on YouTube

"What He Didn't Do" is a song recorded by American country music artist Carly Pearce. It was released on June 13, 2022 as the third and final single from her third studio album 29: Written in Stone. Pearce co-wrote the song with Ashley Gorley and Emily Shackelton.

An acoustic version of the song was released on November 18, 2022.

== Background ==
Pearce co-wrote the song with Gorley and Shackleton in late 2020, following her divorce from Michael Ray. Upon Pearce first playing the song, it would pick up a large reception among fans. It eventually became the third single from the album 29: Written in Stone, after radio stations had also inquired about it.

== Content ==
The song describes a breakup from a female perspective, listing off everything the male lover "didn't do" in the relationship, rather than detailing what he did to end it.

== Chart performance ==
Before the song's release as a single, it charted on Hot Country Songs at number 43. Upon release, it would debut at number 53 on Country Airplay. It peaked at number 2 on that chart, behind "Rock and a Hard Place" by Bailey Zimmerman. On March 27, 2023, it reached number one on the Aircheck/Mediabase chart, becoming the first woman in 80 weeks to top the country radio charts with a solo track.

== Charts ==
=== Weekly charts ===
Chart performance for "What He Didn't Do"
Chart (2022–2023)	Peak position
Canada Hot 100 (Billboard)	84
Canada Country (Billboard)	3
US Billboard Hot 100	37
US Country Airplay (Billboard)	2
US Hot Country Songs (Billboard)	11

=== Year-end charts ===
2022 year-end chart performance for "What He Didn't Do"
Chart (2022)	Position
US Hot Country Songs (Billboard)	72

2023 year-end chart performance for "What He Didn't Do"
Chart (2023)	Position
US Country Airplay (Billboard)	22
US Hot Country Songs (Billboard)	38

== Certifications ==
Certifications for "What He Didn't Do"
Region	Certification	Certified units/sales
Canada (Music Canada)	Platinum	80,000^{‡}
United States (RIAA)	2× Platinum	2,000,000^{‡}
^{‡} Sales+streaming figures based on certification alone.
