= 29: Written in Stone =

Studio album by Carly Pearce
- Released: September 17, 2021
- Studios: Evan's Place; Maverick Recordings; The Robbins Nest; Santa's Workspace; Sound Stage Studios; Sound Emporium
- Genres: Country; contemporary country
- Length: 51:38
- Label: Big Machine
- Producers: Shane McAnally; Josh Osborne; Tony Brown; Jimmy Robbins

Carly Pearce chronology
| 29 (2021) | 29: Written in Stone (2021) | 29: Written in Stone (Live from Music City) (2023) |

Singles from 29: Written in Stone
- 1. "Next Girl" Released: September 4, 2020; 2. "Never Wanted to Be That Girl" Released: September 20, 2021; 3. "What He Didn't Do" Released: June 13, 2022

29: Written in Stone is the third studio album by American country music artist Carly Pearce. It was released on September 17, 2021, via Big Machine Records and contained 15 tracks. The album is a continuation of Pearce's 2021 EP, which chronicled her divorce from Michael Ray and the death of her former producer Busbee. It was the third studio album released in Pearce's career and third released on the Big Machine label. Three singles have since been spawned from the project, including the top 20 charting song "Next Girl," as well as the number 1 hit "Never Wanted to Be That Girl." The album has since received positive reviews from critics.

== Background ==
Pearce made two commercially-successful albums with producer busbee, who died in 2019. Following the start of the COVID-19 pandemic, Pearce divorced country artist Michael Ray. These experiences shaped a seven-song extended play (EP) released in February 2021 titled 29. In the wake of its release, Pearce mentioned that she was not finished releasing new music. "I’ve realized over the last few weeks that I wasn’t entirely finished writing my 29 chapter..." she commented in April 2021.

She ultimately wanted to finish what the 29 EP music journey had started. "What you hear in this project is every stage of a relationship ending, the realization, the grief, the anger, the confusion...as soon as I could see all of these songs, I saw the pieces that they represented, and I felt like it was finished," she told People. In August 2021, Pearce announced the release of the final project titled 29: Written in Stone.

== Recording and content ==
29: Written in Stone was recorded at six separate studios all located in Nashville, Tennessee: Evan's Place, Maverick Recordings, The Robbins Nest, Santa's Workspace, Sound Stage Studios and The Sound Emporium. Shane McAnally, Josh Osborne and Jimmy Robbins served as Pearce's producers on the project. All three producers also crafted the original 29 EP. Pearce and her producers continued the EP's "'90s country" sound, which went back to a more traditional approach inspired by country artists of her youth. "What I found was Shane McAnally and Josh Osborne loved '90s country like I did. It opened this understanding of the same way that we listened to music growing up that I had never experienced with busbee, [since] he was a pop producer," she explained.

The album contained a total of 15 tracks, all of which were co-written by Pearce. Five songs included writing credits from Shane McAnally and Josh Osborne. Many of the album's material was composed by female writers, including country artists Kelsea Ballerini and Ashley McBryde. "These women were the first to message me as soon as my divorce came out, and really care about me as a person. I was able to be brutally honest in those rooms because I felt safe with them," she explained. Forbes described the project's opening track, "Diamondback", as "a twisted fairy tale with memorable fiddle accompaniment". People magazine described "What He Didn't Do" as "a ballad that walks the difficult line between cautious discretion and righteous indignation." The bluegrass-inspired "Easy Going" featured background vocals from Sonya Isaacs of The Isaacs.

Other tracks on the album included fellow country artists. "Dear Miss Loretta" features harmony and duet vocals from Patty Loveless. The song also pays homage to country singer-songwriter Loretta Lynn. The song's description of rural Appalachia is also representative of Pearce and Loveless's backgrounds, since both artists come from Kentucky. Pearce explained her appreciated for Loveless to Taste of Country: "To hear Patty Loveless sing your words, there’s no way to describe that sensation". Also included is a duet with Ashley McBryde titled "Never Wanted to Be That Girl". In the song, Pearce plays the wife of a cheating husband while McBryde plays the mistress. Rolling Stone compared the track to Linda Davis and Reba McEntire's duet "Does He Love You", which had a similar theme.

The album's title is derived from the track "Mean It This Time", which features the lyrics "I'm gonna write it in stone". Pearce explained to Forbes the song's overall message: "For me, it truly means that your words and your actions and your truth should be written in stone, and I really, truly feel like that's what the last year has taught me." "Your Drinkin' My Problem" and "All the Whiskey in the World" were also new songs included on the collection. The remaining seven songs included on 29: Written in Stone were first released on Pearce's 2021 EP.

== Critical reception ==
Professional ratings
Review scores
| Source | Rating |
|---|---|
| AllMusic | 3.5/5 stars |
| Entertainment Focus | 5/5 stars |

29: Written in Stone received critical acclaim from journalists and writers. Stephen Thomas Erlewine of AllMusic gave the album a three and a half star rating. Erlewine praised the album's self-reflection in its lyrics and vocal performance in songs like "Dear Miss Loretta". Erlewine concluded the review by commenting, "While Pearce's lyrics can occasionally be a bit too on-the-nose -- it's not that she delves into personal details, it's that she ties up her messy emotions with a tidy bow -- her vulnerability is endearing, and the craftsmanship, aided by producers Shane McAnally and Josh Osborne, is sturdy, so the music retains its appeal even after the stories become familiar."

Chris Willman of Variety compared the album's style to that of classic country artists: "She's picking up the pieces — of her life, and of old Conway and Loretta records, too." Willman found that the album's divorce-inspired lyrics helped created a better record: "For now, anyway, it's our fortune that she's back to being a miss [instead of misses], and that her musical giftedness in getting it all off her chest is right up there with her level of grievance. If you've got a hankering for some sad-ass country music, happy days are here again."

Entertainment Focus gave the record a five-star review, calling it "the finest record of her career and one of the finest Country albums of the past 20 years."

== Release and chart performance ==
The release of 29: Written in Stone was preceded by two songs released as promotional singles. The first was "Dear Miss Loretta", which was released the day of the album's announcement on August 3, 2021. "Never Wanted to Be That Girl" was released on September 15, 2021, two days prior to the album's official release date. It was also preceded by the radio single, "Next Girl", which was first included on the original 29 EP. The single reached the top 20 of the Billboard Country Airplay chart, peaking at number 15 in 2021. The album was officially released on September 17, 2021 on Big Machine Records, becoming Pearce's third studio record. It was originally offered as a compact disc, digitally and as a vinyl LP. "Never Wanted to Be That Girl" was announced as the project's second single and was released on September 17, 2021. The song received 142 adds to country radio stations in its first week.

== Track listing ==
All tracks are written by Carly Pearce, with additional co-writers as noted.

29: Written in Stone (CD and digital versions)
| No. | Title | Writer(s) | Length |
|---|---|---|---|
| 1. | "Diamondback" | Kelsea Ballerini; Tofer Brown; Shane McAnally | 3:02 |
| 2. | "What He Didn't Do" | Ashley Gorley; Emily Shackelton | 3:11 |
| 3. | "Easy Going" | Natalie Hemby; Josh Osborne | 4:46 |
| 4. | "Dear Miss Loretta" (featuring Patty Loveless) | Brandy Clark; McAnally | 3:40 |
| 5. | "Next Girl" | McAnally; Osborne | 2:44 |
| 6. | "Should've Known Better" | Jordan Reynolds; Shackelton | 3:01 |
| 7. | "29" | McAnally; Osborne | 3:42 |
| 8. | "Never Wanted to Be That Girl" (with Ashley McBryde) | McAnally; Ashley McBryde | 3:34 |
| 9. | "Your Drinkin', My Problem" | Nicolle Galyon; Sasha Sloan; Ben West | 3:34 |
| 10. | "Liability" | McAnally; Osborne | 2:44 |
| 11. | "Messy" | Sarah Buxton; Jimmy Robbins | 2:53 |
| 12. | "Show Me Around" | Shackelton; West | 3:40 |
| 13. | "Day One" | McAnally; Osborne; Matthew Ramsey | 3:30 |
| 14. | "All the Whiskey in the World" | Jordan Terry Minton; Reynolds; Shackelton | 3:06 |
| 15. | "Mean It This Time" | Minton; Reynolds; Shackelton | 4:08 |
| Total length: | | | 51:38 |

== Personnel ==
All credits are adapted from the liner notes of 29: Written in Stone and AllMusic.

Musical personnel

- Dave Cohen – keyboards, piano, synthesizer
- Fred Eltringham – drums, percussion, programming
- Jeneé Fleenor – fiddle
- Ryan Gore – programming
- Evan Hutchings – drums, percussion
- Ben Isaacs – background vocals
- Sonya Isaacs – background vocals
- Patty Loveless – guest vocals (4)
- Josh Matheny – dobro, steel guitar
- Ashley McBryde – guest vocals (8)
- Rob McNelley – electric guitar
- Russ Pahl – pedal steel guitar
- Josh Osborne – background vocals
- Carly Pearce – lead vocals, background vocals
- Jimmy Robbins – acoustic guitar, bass guitar, keyboards, programming
- Emily Shackleton – background vocals
- Ilya Toshinsky – acoustic guitar, mandolin
- Derek Wells – banjo, electric guitar, steel guitar, mandolin
- Craig Young – bass guitar

Technical personnel

- Allister Ann – photography
- Tony Brown – producer (track 4)
- Dave Clauss – digital editing, engineer
- Josh Ditty – engineer
- Emory Gordy, Jr. – vocal engineer
- Ryan Gore – engineer, mixing, percussion
- Mike "Frog" Griffith – production coordination
- Evan Hutchings – recording
- Ted Jensen – mastering
- Scott Johnson – production coordination
- Kam Luchterland – assistant engineer
- Shane McAnally – producer (all tracks except 11)
- Josh McKenney – assistant
- Josh Osborne – producer (all tracks except 11)
- Jimmy Robbins – mixing, mixing engineer, producer (track 11), recording
- Chris Small – editing
- Holly Taylor – graphic design
- Derek Wells – recording
- Brian David Willis – editing

== Charts ==
=== Weekly charts ===
Weekly chart performance for 29: Written in Stone
| Chart (2021) | Peak position |
|---|---|
| Scottish Albums (Official Charts) | 54 |
| UK Country Albums (Official Charts) | 2 |
| UK Album Downloads (Official Charts) | 45 |
| US Billboard 200 | 83 |
| US Top Country Albums (Billboard) | 9 |

=== Year-end charts ===
2022 year-end chart performance for 29: Written in Stone
| Chart (2022) | Position |
|---|---|
| US Top Country Albums (Billboard) | 58 |

== Release history ==
Release history and formats for 29: Written in Stone
| Region | Date | Format | Label | Ref. |
|---|---|---|---|---|
| North America | September 17, 2021 | Compact disc; music download; streaming; vinyl | Big Machine | |
