= Next Girl =

Single by Carly Pearce

from the album 29: Written in Stone
- Released: September 4, 2020
- Genre: Country
- Length: 2:44
- Label: Big Machine
- Songwriter(s): Shane McAnally; Josh Osborne; Carly Pearce
- Producer(s): Shane McAnally; Josh Osborne

Carly Pearce singles chronology
"I Hope You're Happy Now" (2019)	"Next Girl" (2020)	"Never Wanted to Be That Girl" (2021)

"Next Girl" is a song co-written and recorded by American country music artist Carly Pearce. It was released in September 2020 as the lead single from her third studio album 29: Written in Stone. The song was recorded in a traditional country style, drawing similarities to female country artists from the 1990s. Pearce wrote this song with Shane McAnally and Josh Osborne.

== Background and content ==
Prior to the recording of "Next Girl", Pearce had success with the single "I Hope You're Happy Now". The duet with Lee Brice was a number-one hit and was produced by Pearce's longtime collaborator busbee. During the time of its success, busbee died from complications of a brain tumor. The loss discouraged Pearce, who was unsure of her next steps musically. She decided to write a song that had a more traditional sound and embodied the characteristics of songs recorded by her musical heroes: Patty Loveless, Reba McEntire, Pam Tillis and The Chicks. Pearce collaborated with songwriters Shane McAnally and Josh Osborne on the song. Both composers had an affection for 1990s country, according to Pearce.

== Critical reception ==
"Next Girl" has received mostly positive reception since its release. Angela Setfano of Taste of Country praised Pearce's vocal performance on the song: "Her skillful delivery makes it come across like a hushed warning from a friend of a friend who dated the guy you're seeing now." Joseph Hudak of Rolling Stone also gave the song a positive review: "The production is lean, highlighting Pearce’s impassioned delivery and some Appalachian sounds of Dobro. Like Loveless, Pearce is a Kentucky native."

Holly Gleason of American Songwriter noted that "Next Girl" had a "shinier" and "warmer" vocal delivery when compared to the "angst" heard in her previous hits. Zackary Kephart of Country Universe gave "Next Girl" a "B" grade in his review of the song. Kephart commented that the song's melody could have been "stronger" to match its traditional style. Yet, he concluded positively: "it mostly works well enough for what it is, resulting in a solid song that signals an intriguing artistic pivot for Pearce."

== Release and music video ==
"Next Girl" was released at midnight on September 4, 2020 via Big Machine Records. The song was released digitally and to streaming services, including Apple Music. The song officially went for ads to country radio on September 28, 2020. That week, it became the "most added song to country radio", according to Country Now. In total, 57 stations added the single to their playlists. Pearce later commented that she was "in shock" with its initial success. "Country radio, thank you for believing in who I am as an artist," Pearce commented in September. On October 3, the single debuted at number 54 on the Billboard Country Airplay chart. The following week, the song reached the number 48 position.

The music video premiered on October 25, 2020 and was directed by Seth Kupersmith. Filmed entirely in one take, it features Pearce in a local dive bar, dealing with unwanted advances from male patrons as she goes back and forth in character between going on dates with customers, serving as a waitress, and performing on stage with the house band.

== Charts ==
=== Weekly charts ===
Weekly chart performance for "Next Girl"
Chart (2020–2021)	Peak position
Canada (Canadian Hot 100)	55
Canada Country (Billboard)	2
US Billboard Hot 100	86
US Country Airplay (Billboard)	15
US Hot Country Songs (Billboard)	23

=== Year-end charts ===
Year-end chart performance for "Next Girl"
Chart (2021)	Position
US Country Airplay (Billboard)	46
US Hot Country Songs (Billboard)	48

== Certifications ==
Certifications for "Next Girl"
Region	Certification	Certified units/sales
Canada (Music Canada)	Platinum	80,000^{‡}
United States (RIAA)	Platinum	1,000,000^{‡}
^{‡} Sales+streaming figures based on certification alone.
