= Carly Pearce =

American singer-songwriter (born 1990)

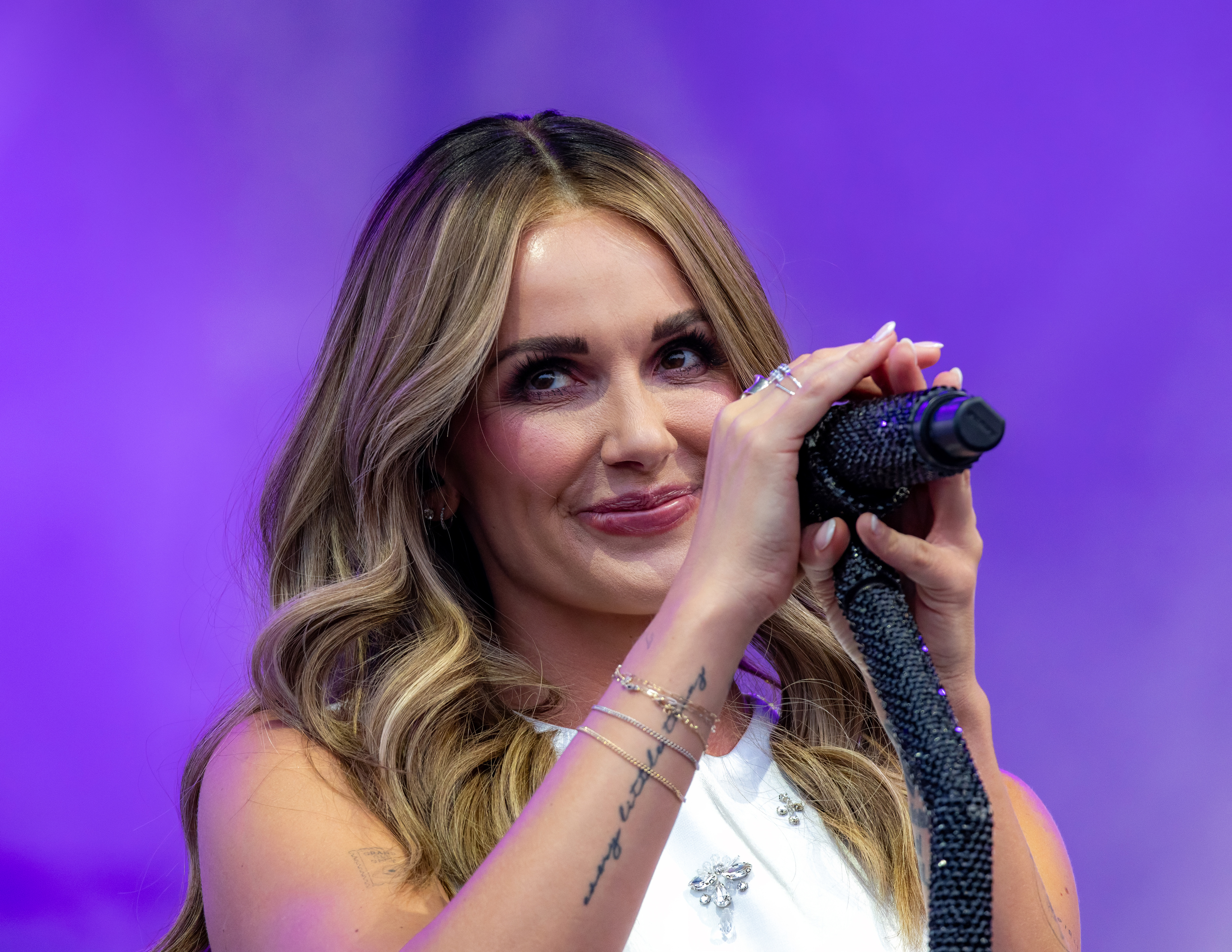
- Pearce performing on the Hummingbird tour
- Born: Carly Cristyne Slusser; April 24, 1990 (age 36); Taylor Mill, Kentucky, U.S.
- Occupations: Singer; songwriter
- Years active: 2006–present
- Spouse: Michael Ray (m. 2019; div. 2020)
- Musical career
- Genre: Country
- Instruments: Vocals; guitar; mandolin
- Labels: Big Machine; BBR Music Group
- Website: carlypearce.com

Carly Pearce (born Carly Cristyne Slusser; April 24, 1990) is an American country music singer and songwriter. Her material contains elements of both traditional and contemporary country-pop music. Pearce began performing professionally in her teens, appearing on several albums of bluegrass material in the 2000s. After moving to Nashville, Tennessee, she began gaining more widespread notice.

Pearce first gained major recognition in 2017 when her self-penned "Every Little Thing" found an audience on satellite radio. The song helped Pearce secure a major label recording contract and became a major hit, reaching number one on the Billboard country chart. Her debut album of the same name debuted in the top five of the Billboard Top Country Albums chart. Pearce has since released new material, including the 2020 single "Next Girl" from 29, an EP released on February 19, 2021. On September 17, 2021, she released her third studio album 29: Written in Stone. Pearce is a three-time Country Music Association Award winner, a four-time Academy of Country Music Award winner, has received one CMT Music Award and one Grammy Award. She became a member of the Grand Ole Opry in 2021.

== Early life ==
Pearce was born Carly Cristyne Slusser in Taylor Mill, Kentucky to Todd and Jackie (née Pearce) Slusser. Pearce developed interest in country music from her grandparents, who regularly played it at home during her childhood. Her stage name is based on her grandfather's last name. In a home video saved by her family, Pearce declared that one day she would perform on the Grand Ole Opry. In mid-childhood, she began performing professionally. At age 11, Pearce performed regularly with a bluegrass band. She also performed in church and tent revival shows. At age 14, she performed at a boys prison.

At age 16, Pearce auditioned for the "Country Crossroads" show, a program part of the Dollywood theme park. After being offered the job, she convinced her parents to move to Pigeon Forge, Tennessee (the location of Dollywood), and to let her drop out of high school. Reflecting on the experience in 2017, Pearce commented, "Performing at Dollywood was a key part of my journey to finding myself and finding my way." While performing at Dollywood, she enrolled in a homeschooling program. The online course allowed Pearce choices to pursue collegiate opportunities post-graduation if she so desired. Pearce commented that the online program was similar to a college course in that her "parents wouldn't have to do anything". During her time at the park, Pearce performed at Dollywood five times a week, often in several shows per day. Additionally, she contributed her vocals to compilation albums of bluegrass music.

== Career ==
=== 2009–2016: Beginnings ===
Pearce moved to Nashville, Tennessee, at age 19 to pursue a country music career. She would later describe her early years in Nashville as similar to a "roller coaster" ride. She signed a developmental deal with Sony Music Nashville in 2012. Pearce's producer was fired from the label. With the producer's termination, Pearce lost her deal with Sony. She later said that experience of having an opportunity and then losing it was difficult. In a 2017 interview with Nash Country Daily, Pearce commented, "Of course there were moments that I wanted to quit music. My condo has seen many tears and heard many prayers at night. I've always known I wanted to do this, and like I said a little earlier, when you open your brain to still staying in the game and waiting it out and fighting and really understanding that this is a business." After losing the opportunity, she took a series of part-time jobs to help make ends meet. Among these jobs was cleaning Airbnb's.

While working part-time jobs, Pearce began networking with other performers and executives in the country music industry. Around this time, she met Pete Fisher, who was the vice president and general manager of the Grand Ole Opry. Fisher provided Pearce the opportunity to perform on the Opry in 2015 (which was before she had a recording contract). From their professional relationship, Fisher informed record producer Busbee about her musical abilities and interests. In 2015, Busbee signed her to a developing artist deal.

In 2016, Pearce was featured on the track "Wasn't That Drunk" by the country group Josh Abbott Band. Released as a single that year, it peaked at number 37 on the Billboard Country Airplay chart. Her performance on the song allowed Pearce to gain exposure to country radio stations. She also performed with the Josh Abbott Band on television, including a performance on Jimmy Kimmel Live! The same year, Pearce was being brought to the attention of multiple Nashville record labels. However, all had declined to sign her. In an interview with Forbes, she recalled being told by several industry professionals to move home or pursue other interests. The same year, Busbee produced a track co-written by Pearce entitled "Every Little Thing". Released independently, it was picked up for radio airplay on SiriusXM's The Highway channel, where it received widespread recognition. Following its recognition, Pearce was offered multiple recording contracts. She ultimately chose to sign with Big Machine Records.

=== 2017–2019: Breakout with "Every Little Thing" and "I Hope You're Happy Now" ===
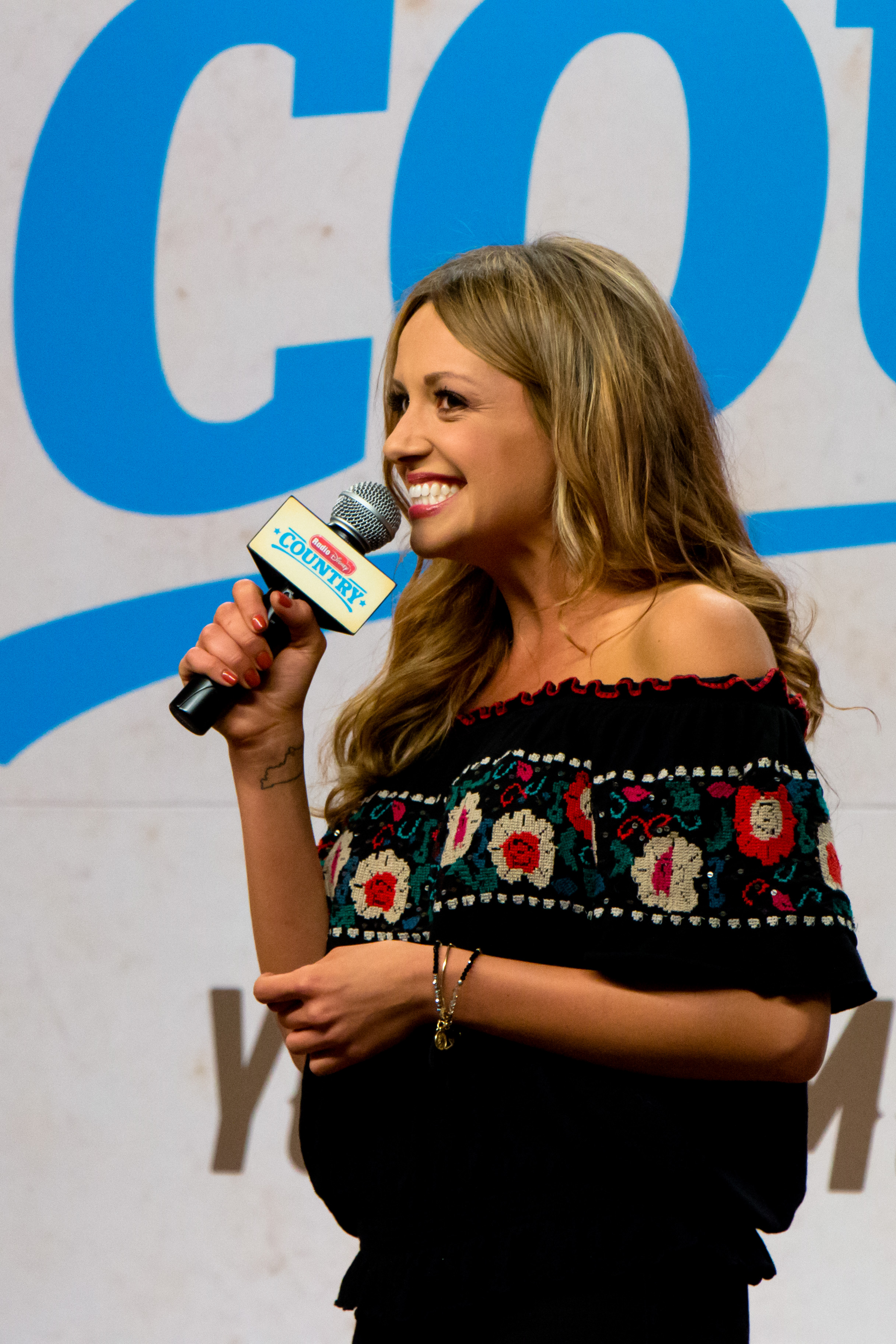
Pearce at the CMA Music Festival in 2017

"Every Little Thing" was officially released as a single to country radio in February 2017. By November, the song had become a major hit, peaking at number five on the Billboard Hot Country Songs chart and number one on the Billboard Country Airplay chart. "Every Little Thing" sold over 500,000 copies in the United States, receiving a gold certification from the Recording Industry Association of America. Pearce's debut studio album was released the same year, also named Every Little Thing. The album debuted at number four on the Billboard Top Country Albums list short after its release. It also reached number 32 on the Billboard 200 albums chart. The album received critical acclaim by music writers and critics. Stephen Thomas Erlewine of AllMusic gave the release four of five stars calling "polished professionalism", but also contrasting it to the bluegrass musical style of earlier career work. In his concluding statement Erlewine commented, "her showbiz and country roots are inextricably entangled, a singer with a feel for the past but an eye for the present." Jewly Hight of NPR also praised the album, drawing similarities between her vocals and that of artists such as Alison Krauss and Trisha Yearwood.

During this time, Pearce established herself further with further musical projects. This included touring with Luke Bryan, Thomas Rhett, and Blake Shelton. Her next single release, "Hide the Wine", was spawned from her 2017 album. It became Pearce's second major hit, reaching number 13 on the Billboard Country Airplay chart in 2018. The same year, she issued a single that was to be the lead release of her upcoming second studio album. Entitled "Closer to You", the song was released in November 2018 and reached the top 40 of the Billboard country charts.

In October 2019, Pearce released a second single from her unreleased second studio album. The song, "I Hope You're Happy Now", was a duet with country artist Lee Brice. The song was her second to reach the number one spot on the Billboard Country Airplay chart. After taking time to marry singer Michael Ray, her self-titled second studio album was issued in February 2020. It would be Busbee's final production project before his death in 2019. It debuted at number six on the Top Country Albums list and number 73 on the Billboard 200. Jason Scott of American Songwriter gave it three of five stars and called the album an example that "illustrates an artist learning, growing, and embracing the good, the bad, and ugly."

=== 2020–present: 29: Written in Stone, Hummingbird and Honest Woman ===
In June 2020, Pearce revealed that she was recording new music and that her next single will not be a track off of her second album. In September 2020, she released the single, "Next Girl". In February 2021, Pearce released her first extended play collection titled, 29. The album's name was derived from personal setbacks she endured during her twenty ninth year. These events included her divorce from singer, Michael Ray, and the death of her long-time producer, Busbee. The EP received praise from American Songwriter, which called it an "exquisite seven song collection." Rolling Stone noted a "progression" in its seven tracks that ends "in a place of hope." Following its release, "Next Girl" reached the top 15 of the Billboard country airplay chart.

In June 2021, Pearce was invited by Dolly Parton to become a cast member of the Grand Ole Opry. A month later, she announced the release of her third studio album titled 29: Written in Stone alongside the promotional single "Dear Miss Loretta", a tribute to Loretta Lynn featuring Patty Loveless. The album was a continuation of her 2021 EP. It was officially released in September 2021. It reached number nine on the Billboard country albums chart and number 83 on the Billboard 200. The disc received positive reviews from critics, including AllMusic, which praised her "vulnerability" and Variety which highlighted its traditional musical sound. The disc spawned the 2021 single, "Never Wanted to Be That Girl", a duet with Ashley McBryde. It became Pearce's third single to top the Billboard Country Airplay chart. In October 2022, Pearce headlined two sold-out shows at the Ryman Auditorium. The album's third single "What He Didn't Do" reached number one on the Aircheck/Mediabase chart, becoming the first woman in 80 weeks to top the country radio charts with a solo track.

In early 2023, Pearce won her first accolade from the Grammy Awards for her performance on "Never Wanted to Be That Girl". In March 2023, Pearce's first live album was released titled 29: Written in Stone (Live from Music City). It featured the entirety of her previous album, along with several additional tracks and special guests. In 2024, Pearce announced the release of her next studio album Hummingbird. The original release was scheduled for June 14, but Pearce pushed the release date to June 7 to correspond with CMA Fest. Hummingbird rose to number 31 on the US country albums chart. Its lead single "We Don't Fight Anymore" (featuring harmony vocals from Chris Stapleton), reached the US country top ten in 2024. A deluxe edition of the album, titled Hummingbird: No Rain, No Flowers, was released on March 14, 2025.

Pearce released "Dream Come True", the lead single from her fifth studio album Honest Woman, on November 14, 2025. In March 2026, it was followed by "If I Don't Leave I'm Gonna Stay", a duet with Riley Green. In June 2026, Pearce announced that she had signed a new joint record deal with BBR Music Group and BMG Rights Management, with the Stoney Creek imprint taking over radio promotion for "If I Don't Leave I'm Gonna Stay".

On October 26, 2026, Pearce sang the National Anthem before the third game of the World Series between the Milwaukee Brewers and Tampa Bay Rays at Tropicana Field in St. Petersburg.

== Musical styles ==
Pearce's musical style is rooted in the contemporary country and bluegrass genres. Her musical experiences included performing as part of a bluegrass band. These early performances influenced the style she would later create. Pearce has also credited notable bluegrass artists for their influence on her. This includes Alison Krauss, Ricky Skaggs, and Rhonda Vincent. Pearce's music has also been described as having elements of contemporary country. When reviewing her 2017 studio album, AllMusic's Stephen Thomas Erlewine noted that it "still bears all the hallmarks of contemporary country production. It's crisp and nimble, using electronic and R&B as flair that accentuates the songs." In Taste of Country's review of Pearce's 2017 album, it was mentioned that several album tracks (such as "Catch Fire") were "pop-leaning" in their sound.

In addition to bluegrass performers, Pearce has also been inspired by contemporary country artists. She has credited "late 1990s" female artists as major influences, notably Shania Twain and Trisha Yearwood. Pearce was also inspired by the career decisions of female country artists, including Faith Hill. In an interview with Good Morning America, Pearce commented that she wanted her career choices to resemble Hill's: "I really want to be like what Faith Hill was to our genre back then. I love country music so much, and I wanted to do a little bit of that retro, cowhide, kind of throwback to the '90s ... but, like, a new spin on it."

== Personal life ==
In July 2018, Pearce confirmed that she was dating fellow country singer Michael Ray. They became engaged on December 19, 2018. Ray proposed to Pearce at a beach resort in Tulum, Mexico, alongside Pearce's family who also attended the vacation. The two were married on October 6, 2019, near Nashville, Tennessee. In June 2020, Pearce filed for divorce from Ray after eight months of marriage.

In 2021, she began dating former Minor League Baseball player Riley King. In June 2023, it was reported they had separated. In the summer of 2023, Pearce had begun dating drummer B.C. Taylor, the son of late musician B.E. Taylor, who was also a member of her performing band. They had ended their relationship by the summer of 2024. In July 2025, Pearce announced that she is in a relationship with entrepreneur Jordan Karcher.

== Discography ==
Studio albums

- Every Little Thing (2017)
- Carly Pearce (2020)
- 29: Written in Stone (2021)
- Hummingbird (2024)
- Honest Woman (2026)

== Awards and nominations ==
Carly Pearce has received several awards for her work. This includes four from the Academy of Country Music, three from the Country Music Association and one from the Grammy Awards.

== Tours ==
=== Headlining ===
- Way Back Tour (2019) (co-headlining with Russell Dickerson)
- The 29 Tour (2021–2022)
- Country Music Made Me Do It Tour (2023)
- Hummingbird World Tour (2024–2025)
- Inside The Dream Tour (2026)
- Honest Woman: Up Close Tour (2026)

=== Supporting ===
- Caliville Tour (2017) supporting Brett Young
- Back to Us Tour (2018) supporting Rascal Flatts with Dan + Shay
- What Makes You Country Tour (2018) supporting Luke Bryan with Sam Hunt and Jon Pardi
- Ride All Night Tour (2019) supporting Jason Aldean with Kane Brown
- What a Song Can Do Tour (2021) supporting Lady A
- Here and Now Tour (2022) supporting Kenny Chesney with Old Dominion and Dan + Shay
- Back to the Honky Tonk Tour (2023) supporting Blake Shelton
- Standing Room Only Tour (2024) supporting Tim McGraw
