= Cody Johnson discography =

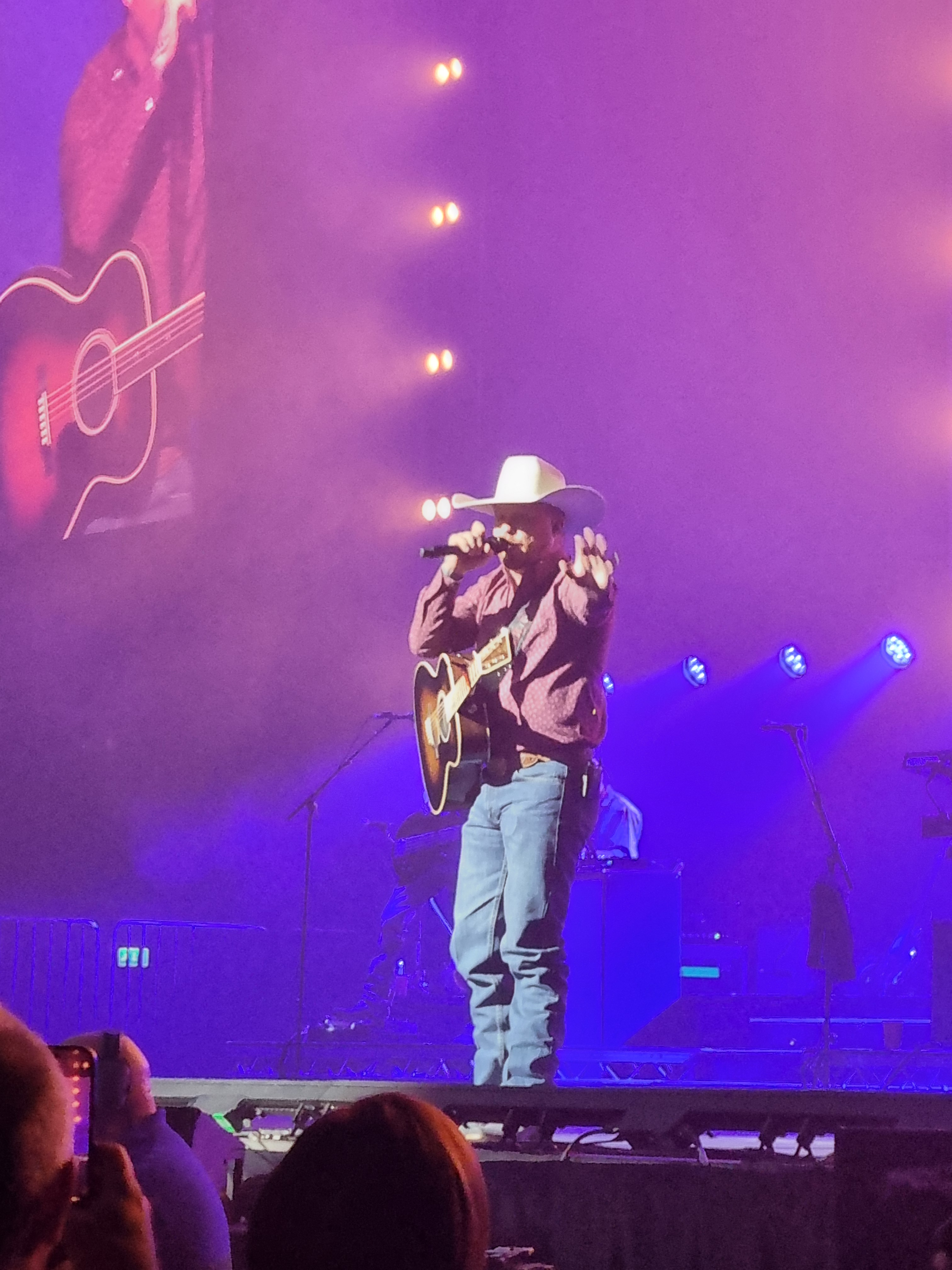
- Johnson in 2025
- Studio albums: 10
- Singles: 15
- Music videos: 9

American singer Cody Johnson has released ten studio albums, fifteen singles and nine music videos. His first six albums were all released independently through his own CoJo label, with 2016's Gotta Be Me producing his first chart single "With You I Am".

In 2018, Johnson signed to Warner Records Nashville and issued Ain't Nothin' to It a year later. It includes the single "On My Way to You", which was his first Top 20 hit on Country Airplay. This was followed by 2021's Human: The Double Album, which was certified gold in both the United States and Canada. The album also included "'Til You Can't", his first number-one single on the Billboard Country Airplay charts.

Johnson had a second number-one on that chart in 2023 with "The Painter", from his third Warner album Leather released that same year. It contained three more successful radio hits "Dirt Cheap", a duet with Carrie Underwood "I'm Gonna Love You", and deluxe reissue track "The Fall". On November 7, 2025, Johnson released his highly anticipated viral cover of The Chicks' ''Travelin' Soldier" in honor of the Veterans Day holiday. Upon its official release, the studio version debuted at No. 12 on the Billboard Hot 100, making it the highest-charting song of his career.

== Albums ==
=== Studio albums ===
Title	Album details	Peak chart positions					Sales	Certifications
Title	Album details	US	US Country	US Indie	AUS	CAN	Sales	Certifications
Black and White Label	Release date: January 6, 2006; Label: CoJo	—	—	—	—	—		
Six Strings One Dream	Release date: September 1, 2009; Label: CoJo	—	—	—	—	—		
A Different Day	Release date: October 31, 2011; Label: CoJo	—	—	—	—	—		
Cowboy Like Me	Release date: January 14, 2014; Label: CoJo	33	7	7	—	—		
Gotta Be Me	Release date: August 5, 2016; Label: CoJo	11	2	1	—	—	US: 43,900	RIAA: Gold
Ain't Nothin' to It	Release date: January 18, 2019; Label: Warner Music Nashville	9	1	—	—	—	US: 63,500	RIAA: Platinum
Human: The Double Album	Release date: October 8, 2021; Label: Warner Music Nashville	19	3	—	—	—		RIAA: Platinum; MC: Gold
Leather	Release date: November 3, 2023; Label: Warner Music Nashville	18	5	—	88	55		RIAA: Platinum
Banks of the Trinity	Release date: June 26, 2026; Label: Warner Music Nashville	28	8	—	—	98		
"—" denotes releases that did not chart

=== Live albums ===
Title	Album details
Live and Rocking	Release date: May 18, 2007; Label: CoJo

== Singles ==
=== As lead artist ===
Title	Year	Peak chart positions							Certification	Album
Title	Year	US	US Country	US Country Airplay	CAN	CAN Country	NZ Hot	WW	Certification	Album
"Dance Her Home"	2013	—	—	—	—	—	—	—	RIAA: Platinum	Cowboy Like Me
"With You I Am"	2016	—	46	40	—	—	—	—	RIAA: Platinum; MC: Gold	Gotta Be Me
"Wild as You"	2017	—	—	53	—	—	—	—	RIAA: Platinum	Gotta Be Me
"On My Way to You"	2018	78	13	11	—	20	—	—	RIAA: 2× Platinum; MC: Gold	Ain't Nothin' to It
"Nothin' on You"	2019	—	43	55	—	—	—	—	RIAA: 2× Platinum	Ain't Nothin' to It
"Dear Rodeo" (featuring Reba McEntire)	2020	—	43	34	—	49	—	—	RIAA: Platinum; MC: Gold	Ain't Nothin' to It
"'Til You Can't"	2021	18	1	1	26	1	—	141	RIAA: 6× Platinum; ARIA: Platinum; MC: 3× Platinum; RMNZ: Platinum	Human: The Double Album
"By Your Grace"	2022	—	—	—	—	—	—	—	RIAA: Gold	Human: The Double Album
"Human"	2022	61	15	8	72	3	—	—	RIAA: 2× Platinum; MC: Platinum	Human: The Double Album
"The Painter"	2023	25	7	1	55	1	27	—	RIAA: 3× Platinum; ARIA: Gold; MC: Platinum; RMNZ: Gold	Leather
"Long Live Cowgirls" (with Ian Munsick)	2023	—	—	54	—	—	—	—	RIAA: Platinum	White Buffalo
"Dirt Cheap"	2024	43	14	5	86	7	—	—	RIAA: 2× Platinum	Leather
"I'm Gonna Love You" (with Carrie Underwood)	2024	37	7	3	78	6	24	—	RIAA: Platinum	Leather (deluxe edition)
"The Fall"	2025	26	7	1	62	38	—	—	RIAA: Platinum	Leather (deluxe edition)
"Horseback"	2026	— (Note: "Horseback" did not enter the Billboard Hot 100, but peaked at number 12 on the Bubbling Under Hot 100 chart.)	38	17	—	23	—	—		Banks of the Trinity
"—" denotes releases that did not chart

=== As featured artist ===
Title	Year	Peak chart positions				Album
Title	Year	US Bub.	US Country	US Country Airplay	US Christ.	Album
"If You Had to Choose" (with Roger Creager)	2015	—	—	—	—	Gulf Coast Time
"Come Jesus Come" (with Cece Winans)	2025	—	—	—	—	Non-album singles
"Hidin Behind This Microphone" (Wade Bowen feat. Cody Johnson)	2025	—	—	—	—	Non-album singles
"If I've Learned Anything" (Jesse Raub Jr. feat. Cody Johnson)	2025	—	—	—	—	What I Came to Do
"Wildfire" (Michael Martin Murphey feat. Cody Johnson)	2025	—	—	—	—	Non-album singles
"When a Cowboy Prays" (with Brandon Lake)	2026	6	43	41	4	Non-album singles
"Born and Raised Hell" (Brothers Osborne feat. Cody Johnson)	2026	—	—	40	—	Watertown

=== Promotional singles ===
Year	Title	Peak chart positions								Certifications	Album
Year	Title	US	US Country	US Country Airplay	CAN	CAN Country	NOR	NZ Hot	WW	Certifications	Album
2018	"Fenceposts"	—	—	—	—	—	—	—	—	RIAA: Gold	Ain't Nothin' to It
2018	"Monday Morning Merle"	—	—	—	—	—	—	—	—		Ain't Nothin' to It
2018	"Long Haired Country Boy"	—	—	—	—	—	—	—	—		Ain't Nothin' to It
2019	"Welcome to the Show"	—	—	—	—	—	—	—	—		Non-album singles
2020	"Whoever's in New England"	—	—	—	—	—	—	—	—		Non-album singles
2021	"Sad Songs and Waltzes" (with Willie Nelson)	—	42	—	—	—	—	—	—		Human: The Double Album
2021	"Longer Than She Did"	—	—	—	—	—	—	—	—		Human: The Double Album
2021	"God Bless the Boy (Cori's Song)"	—	—	—	—	—	—	—	—	RIAA: Gold	Human: The Double Album
2021	"Stronger"	—	—	—	—	—	—	—	—		Human: The Double Album
2021	"Let's Build a Fire"	—	—	—	—	—	—	—	—		Human: The Double Album
2021	"Driveway"	—	—	—	—	—	—	—	—		Human: The Double Album
2021	"Treasure"	—	—	—	—	—	—	—	—		Human: The Double Album
2021	"Son of a Ramblin' Man"	—	—	—	—	—	—	—	—		Human: The Double Album
2022	"Hat Made of Mistletoe"	—	—	—	—	50	—	—	—		A Cody Johnson Christmas
2023	"Double Down"	—	—	—	—	—	—	—	—		Leather
2023	"Watching My Old Flame"	—	—	—	—	—	—	—	—		Leather
2023	"Work Boots"	—	—	—	—	—	—	—	—		Leather
2023	"That's Texas"	—	—	—	—	—	—	—	—		Leather
2024	"Mammas Don't Let Your Babies Grow Up to Be Cowboys"	—	—	—	—	—	—	—	—		Non-album single
2024	"How Do You Sleep at Night?	—	—	—	—	—	—	—	—		Leather (deluxe edition)
2025	"She Hurts Like Tequila" (with Carín León)	—	36	—	—	—	—	—	—		Non-album singles
2025	"Travelin' Soldier"	12	2	40	26	—	58	5	79	RIAA: Gold	Non-album singles
2026	"Blame Texas"	— (Note: "Blame Texas" did not enter the Billboard Hot 100, but peaked at number 23 on the Bubbling Under Hot 100 chart.)	34	—	—	—	—	—	—		Non-album singles
2026	"Footlights"	—	—	—	—	—	—	—	—		Non-album singles
2026	"I Want You"	79	21	—	—	—	—	27	—		Banks of the Trinity
2026	"Hello Lonesome"	—	—	—	—	—	—	—	—		Banks of the Trinity
2026	"Fool Proof"	—	—	—	—	—	—	—	—		Banks of the Trinity
2026	"Take Me Back (Leave Me There)"	31	10	41	26	—	—	30	178		Banks of the Trinity
"—" denotes releases that did not chart

== Other charted and certified songs ==
Year	Title	Peak chart positions			Certifications	Album
Year	Title	US Country	US Country Airplay	NZ Hot	Certifications	Album
2011	"Diamond in My Pocket"	—	—	—	RIAA: Platinum	A Different Day
2011	"Ride with Me"	—	—	—	RIAA: Gold	A Different Day
2014	"Me and My Kind"	—	—	—	RIAA: 2× Platinum; RMNZ: Gold	Cowboy Like Me
2014	"Never Go Home Again"	—	—	—	RIAA: Gold	Cowboy Like Me
2016	"Half a Song"	—	—	—	RIAA: Gold	Gotta Be Me
2019	"Ain't Nothin' to It"	42	—	—	RIAA: Platinum	Ain't Nothin' to It
2023	"Whiskey Bent" (featuring Jelly Roll)	47	—	—		Leather
2023	"Leather"	44	—	36		Leather
2024	"White Christmas"	—	54	—		A Cody Johnson Christmas
2026	"Shoot the Bull" (featuring Luke Combs)	37	—	—		Banks of the Trinity
"—" denotes releases that did not chart

== Music videos ==
Year	Video	Director
2016	"With You I Am"	Dustin Haney
2018	"On My Way to You"	Sean Hagwell
2020	"Dear Rodeo" (featuring Reba McEntire)	Shaun Silva
2021	"'Til You Can’t"	Dustin Haney
2022	"Human"	Dustin Haney
2023	"The Painter"	Dustin Haney
2024	"Dirt Cheap"	Dustin Haney
2024	"I'm Gonna Love You" (with Carrie Underwood)	Dustin Haney
2025	"The Fall"	Dustin Haney
