= 58th Annual Country Music Association Awards =

2024 awards ceremony

- Date: November 20, 2024
- Location: Bridgestone Arena, Nashville, Tennessee
- Hosted by: Luke Bryan; Peyton Manning; Lainey Wilson

Highlights
- Most wins: Chris Stapleton (3)
- Most nominations: Morgan Wallen (7)

Television/radio coverage
- Network: ABC, Hulu
- Viewership: 6.1 million

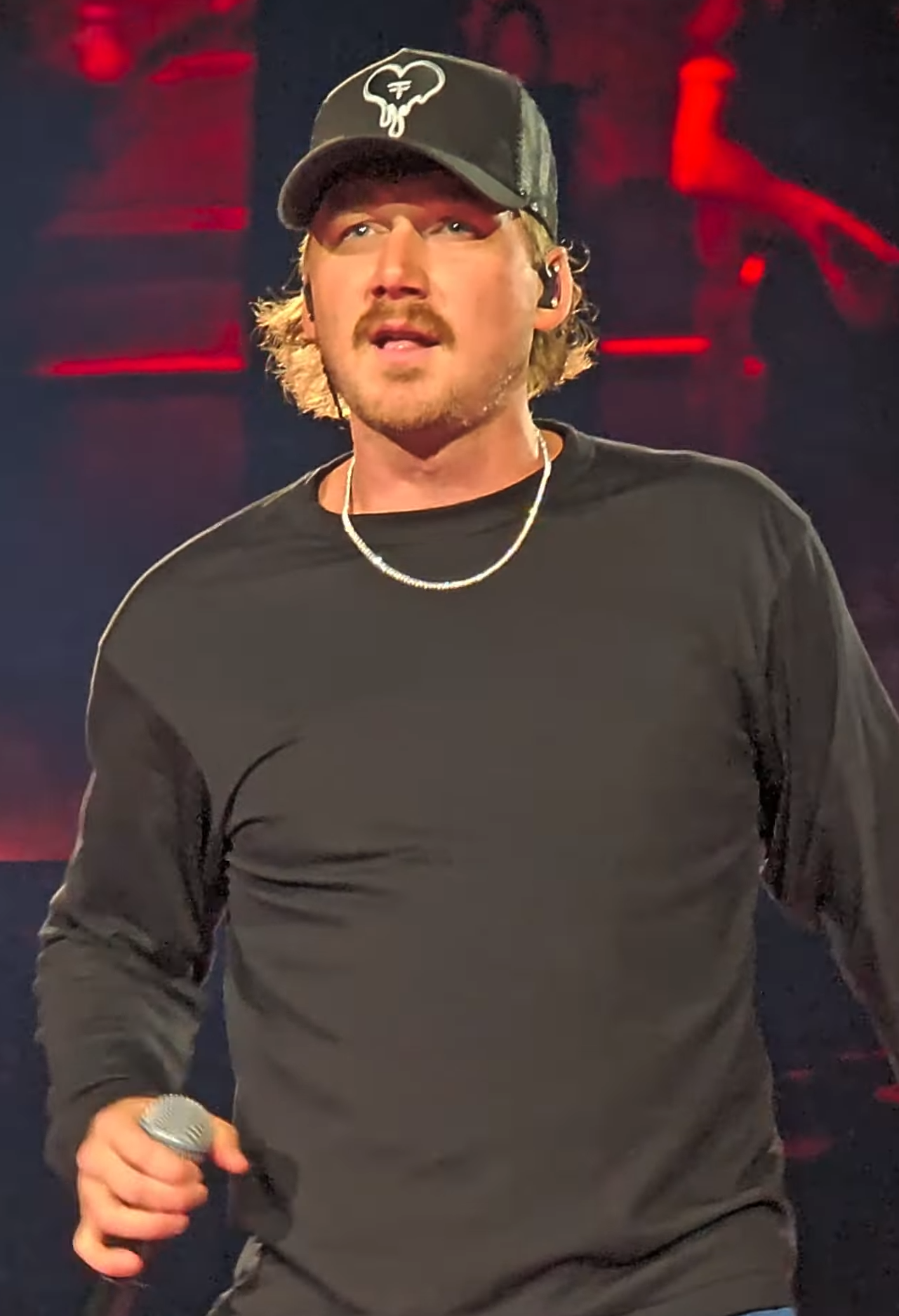
Morgan Wallen, Entertainer of the Year recipient.

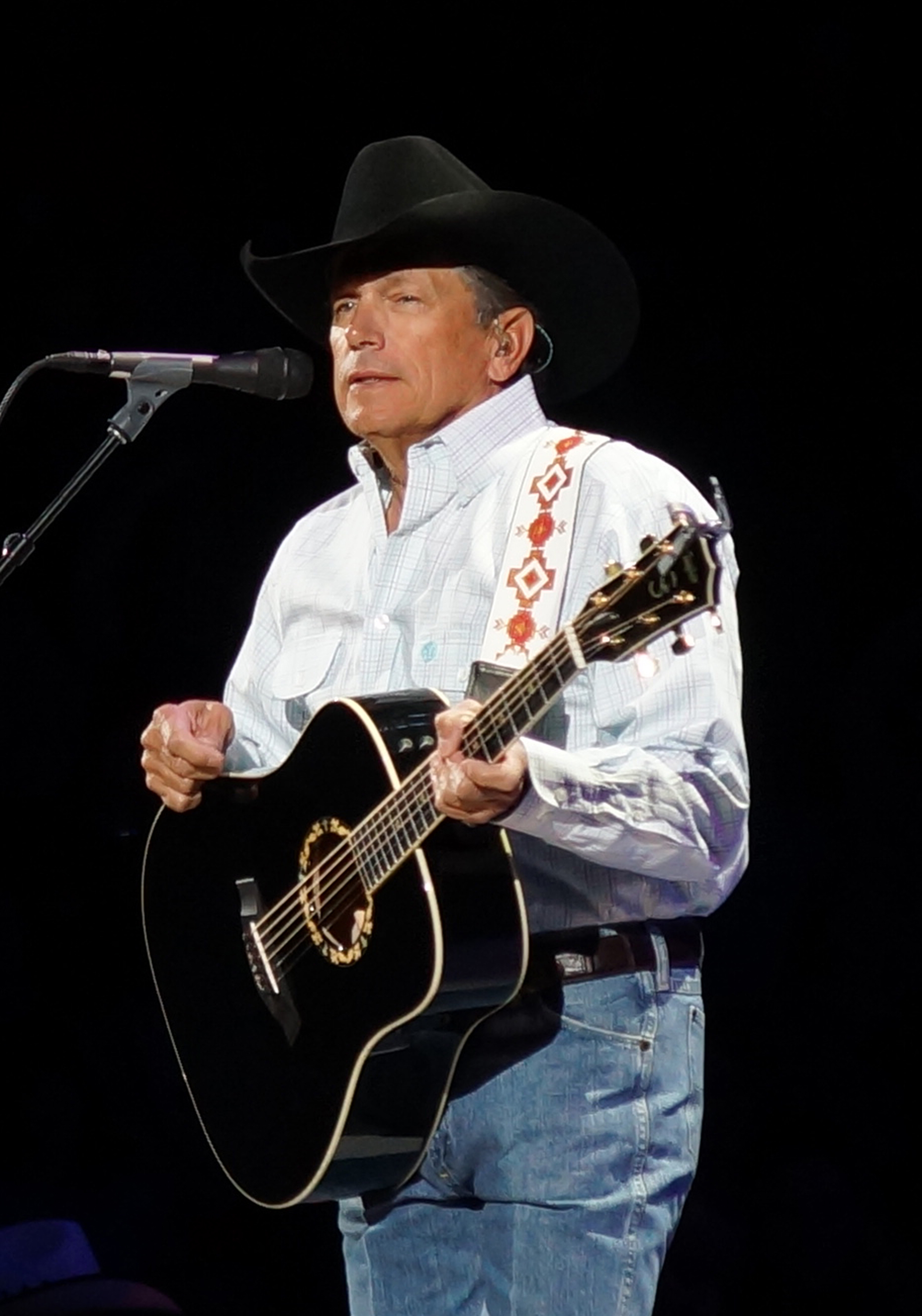
George Strait, Willie Nelson Lifetime Achievement Award recipient.

The 58th Annual Country Music Association Awards were held on November 20, 2024, at the Bridgestone Arena in Nashville. The ceremony was broadcast live on ABC and was available to stream the next day on Hulu and hosted by Lainey Wilson, Luke Bryan and Peyton Manning.

Singer Morgan Wallen lead the nominations with seven nominations, followed by Cody Johnson and Chris Stapleton with five nominations each. Stapleton result as the most awarded artist with three awards while George Strait was honored with the Willie Nelson Lifetime Achievement Award.

The ceremony had faced cultural and racial controversy regarding the organization's decision not to allow Beyoncé's eighth studio album, Cowboy Carter, to be eligible for nomination despite it genre-blending country music.

== Background ==
On September 30, 2024, the association announced that Lainey Wilson, would join fellow CMA award winner Luke Bryan and NFL superstar Peyton Manning as the pair would once again return as the hosts for the upcoming ceremony. Nominee eligibility ran from July 1, 2023, to June 30, 2024. Voting for the CMA Awards Final Ballot ends Tuesday, Oct. 29.

George Strait was announced as the recipient of the Willie Nelson Lifetime Achievement Award on November 12, 2024.

A statement by the CMA chief executive officer Sarah Trahern read “There have been few other artists as authentically Texas and authentically country as George Strait, and country music fans all over the world have been better for it. As a three-time CMA entertainer of the year and the most nominated artist of all time, he serves as an inspiration and icon to many of the great, new artists we know today. I am thrilled we are awarding him with this deserving honor.”

== Winners and nominees ==
On August 28, CMA announced that the list of nominees will be released on, Monday, September 9. Morgan Wallen leads in nominations with seven nods. The winner are listed in bold.

Entertainer of the Year	Album of the Year
**Morgan Wallen**; Luke Combs; Jelly Roll; Chris Stapleton; Lainey Wilson	**Leather** — **Cody Johnson**; Higher — Chris Stapleton; Deeper Well — Kacey Musgraves; Fathers & Sons — Luke Combs; Whitsitt Chapel — Jelly Roll
Male Vocalist of the Year	Female Vocalist of the Year
**Chris Stapleton**; Luke Combs; Jelly Roll; Cody Johnson; Morgan Wallen	**Lainey Wilson**; Kelsea Ballerini; Ashley McBryde; Megan Moroney; Kacey Musgraves
Vocal Group of the Year	Vocal Duo of the Year
**Old Dominion**; Lady A; Little Big Town; The Red Clay Strays; Zac Brown Band	**Brooks & Dunn**; Brothers Osborne; Dan + Shay; Maddie & Tae; The War and Treaty
Single of the Year	Song of the Year
**"White Horse"** — **Chris Stapleton**; “A Bar Song (Tipsy)” — Shaboozey; “Watermelon Moonshine” — Lainey Wilson; “Dirt Cheap" — Cody Johnson; “I Had Some Help” — Post Malone (ft. Morgan Wallen)	**"White Horse"** — **Chris Stapleton**, **Dan Wilson**; “Burn It Down” — Hillary Lindsey, Parker McCollum, Lori McKenna and Liz Rose; “Dirt Cheap — Josh Phillips; “I Had Some Help” — Louis Bell, Ashley Gorley, Charlie Handsome, Jonathan Hoskins, Post Malone, Ernest Keith Smith, Morgan Wallen and Chandler Paul Walters; “The Painter” — Benjy Davis, Kat Higgins, Ryan Larkins
New Artist of the Year	Musician of the Year
**Megan Moroney**; Shaboozey; Nate Smith; Mitchell Tenpenny; Zach Top; Bailey Zimmerman	**Charlie Worsham**, **Guitar**; Tom Bukovac, Guitar; Jenee Fleenor, Fiddle; Paul Franklin, Steel Guitar; Rob McNelley, Guitar
Music Video of the Year	Musical Event of the Year
**“Wildflowers and Wild Horses”** — **Lainey Wilson**; “Dirt Cheap" — Cody Johnson; “I Had Some Help” — Post Malone (ft. Morgan Wallen); “I'm Not Pretty" — Megan Moroney; “The Painter” — Cody Johnson	**“You Look Like You Love Me”** — **Ella Langley (ft. Riley Green)**; "Cowboys Cry Too" — Kelsea Ballerini (with Noah Kahan); “I Had Some Help” — Post Malone (ft. Morgan Wallen); “I Remember Everything” — Zach Bryan (ft. Kacey Musgraves); “Man Made a Bar” — Morgan Wallen (ft. Eric Church)
Willie Nelson Lifetime Achievement Award
**George Strait**

=== International Awards ===
The international winners were announced on November 21, 2024.

International Artist Achievement Award	Global Country Artist Award	Live Music Advancement Award
**Kip Moore**	**Josh Ross**	**Ron Sakamoto**

== Performances ==
Performer(s)	Song(s)
Post Malone; Chris Stapleton	"California Sober"
Megan Moroney	"Am I Okay?"
Shaboozey	"Highway" "A Bar Song (Tipsy)"
Ella Langley; Riley Green	"You Look Like You Love Me"
Thomas Rhett; Teddy Swims	"Somethin' 'Bout a Woman" "Lose Control"
Luke Combs	"Ain't No Love in Oklahoma"
Kelsea Ballerini; Noah Kahan	"Cowboys Cry Too"
Cody Johnson; Carrie Underwood	"I'm Gonna Love You"
Chris Stapleton	"What Am I Gonna Do"
Kacey Musgraves	"The Architect"
Brooks & Dunn; Jelly Roll	"Believe"
Post Malone	"Yours"
Lainey Wilson	"4x4xU"
Bailey Zimmerman	"New To Country"
Lainey Wilson; Jamey Johnson; Miranda Lambert; Parker McCollum; George Strait; Chris Stapleton; Ace in the Hole Band	Willie Nelson Lifetime Achievement Award honoring George Strait "Amarillo By Morning" (with Jenee Fleenor and Charlie Worsham) "Give It Away" "Troubadour" "Honky Tonk Hall of Fame"
Ashley McBryde	Tribute to Kris Kristofferson "Help Me Make It Through the Night"
Luke Bryan	"Love You, Miss You, Mean It"
Eric Church	"Darkest Hour"
Jelly Roll; Keith Urban	"Liar"
Dierks Bentley; Molly Tuttle; Sierra Hull; Bronwyn Keith-Hynes	"American Girl"

== Presenters ==
Presenter(s)	Notes
Billy Bob Thornton and Mark Collie	Presented Single of the Year
Jordan Davis, Carly Pearce, and Daniel Sunjata	Presented Song of The Year
Clint Black and Caleb Pressley	Presented New Artist of the Year
The Oak Ridge Boys	Presented Vocal Group of the Year
Don Johnson and Katharine McPhee	Presented Album of the Year
Mitchell Tenpenny and Taylor Frankie Paul	Presented Vocal Duo of the Year
Little Big Town and Freddie Freeman	Presented Male Vocalist of the Year
Simone Biles	Presented Female Vocalist of the Year
Jeff Bridges	Presented Entertainer of the Year

== Milestones ==
- Little Big Town holds the longest consecutive nomination streak for Vocal Group. They have been on the final ballot since 2006, nineteen years in a row.
- Old Dominion set the record for consecutive Vocal Group of the Year wins this year with their seventh consecutive win.
- Lainey Wilson became just the sixth woman to win Female Vocalist of the Year three years in a row. Only Miranda Lambert, Carrie Underwood, Martina McBride, Reba McEntire, and Tammy Wynette have accomplished the feat.
- Chris Stapleton won his eighth award and extends his record as the most decorated Male Vocalist of the Year.
- Brooks & Dunn and Chris Stapleton became the most decorated CMA Awards artists of all time with nineteen each: Brooks & Dunn winning Vocal Duo of the Year and Chris Stapleton winning Single of the Year, Song of the Year and Male Vocalist of the Year.
- Miranda Lambert and Carrie Underwood had their nomination streak ended after nearly two decades of being nominated in every ceremony since 2005 and 2006 respectively.

== Controversy ==
Following the Country Music Association's announcement of the nominations, numerous US and international publications and music websites criticized the awards ceremony's decision not to nominate Beyoncé and her eighth studio album Cowboy Carter, as well as the lead single "Texas Hold 'Em", in their respective categories, despite the perceived cultural impact and commercial performance. Several publications attributed this to conservatism and racism against Black artists in the country music industry.

On September 17 in an interview with Variety, nine-time CMA award winner and Cowboy Carter collaborator Dolly Parton spoke on Beyonce's apparent snub, "She's a country girl in Texas and Louisiana, so she grew up with that base. It wasn't like she just appeared out of nowhere [...] There's so many wonderful country artists that, I guess probably the country music field, they probably thought, well, we can't really leave out some of the ones that spend their whole life doing that [...] I think it was just more of what the country charts and the country artists were doing, that do that all the time, not just a specialty album." Cowboy Carter collaborator Shaboozey, who received his first two CMA Awards nominations, expressed his gratitude for Beyoncé following the lack of nominations, writing: "Thank you Beyoncé for opening a door for us, starting a conversation, and giving us one of the most innovative country albums of all time".
