= Country Music Association Award for Single of the Year =

Country music award

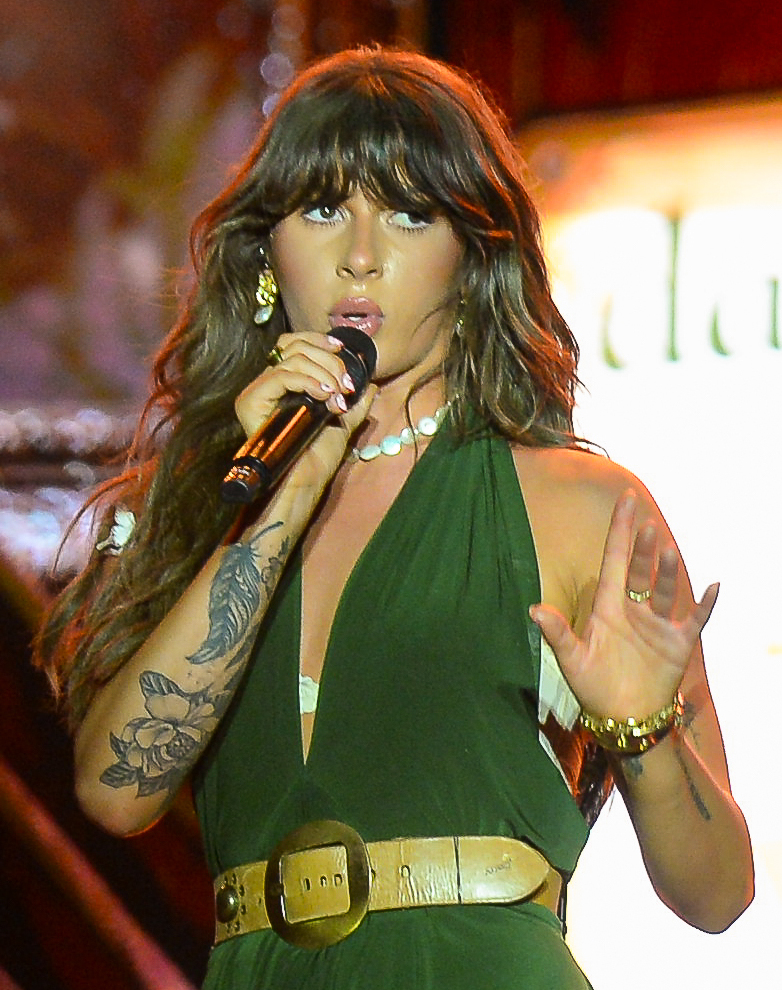
- Current winner of the award Ella Langley
- Country: United States
- Presented by: Country Music Association
- First award: 1967
- Currently held by: Ella Langley (2026)

The following list shows the recipients for the Country Music Association Award for Single of the Year. While its sister category, Song of the Year recognizes the songwriters, Single of the Year is awarded to the artist. Starting in 1989 and 2016 respectively, the producer and mix engineer of the track also received an award. Rules state the track must have reached the Top 10 of Billboard’s Country Airplay Chart, Billboard’s Hot Country Songs Chart, or Country Aircheck Chart for the first time during the eligibility period. If the single charted in the Top 10 on the above charts and was released prior to the eligibility period but achieved its highest chart position during the eligibility period, it is eligible.

The inaugural recipient of the award was "There Goes My Everything" by Jack Greene in 1967, with Jeannie C. Riley becoming the first female winner the following year, and Waylon Jennings/Willie Nelson being the first group awarded in 1976. To date, there are eight artists who have won the award twice. George Strait has the most nominations in this category, with nine, while eight—time nominee Brad Paisley holds the record for most nominations without a win. The current holder of the award is Ella Langley and Riley Green for "You Look Like You Love Me", which won at the 58th Annual Country Music Association Awards in 2024.

== Recipients ==
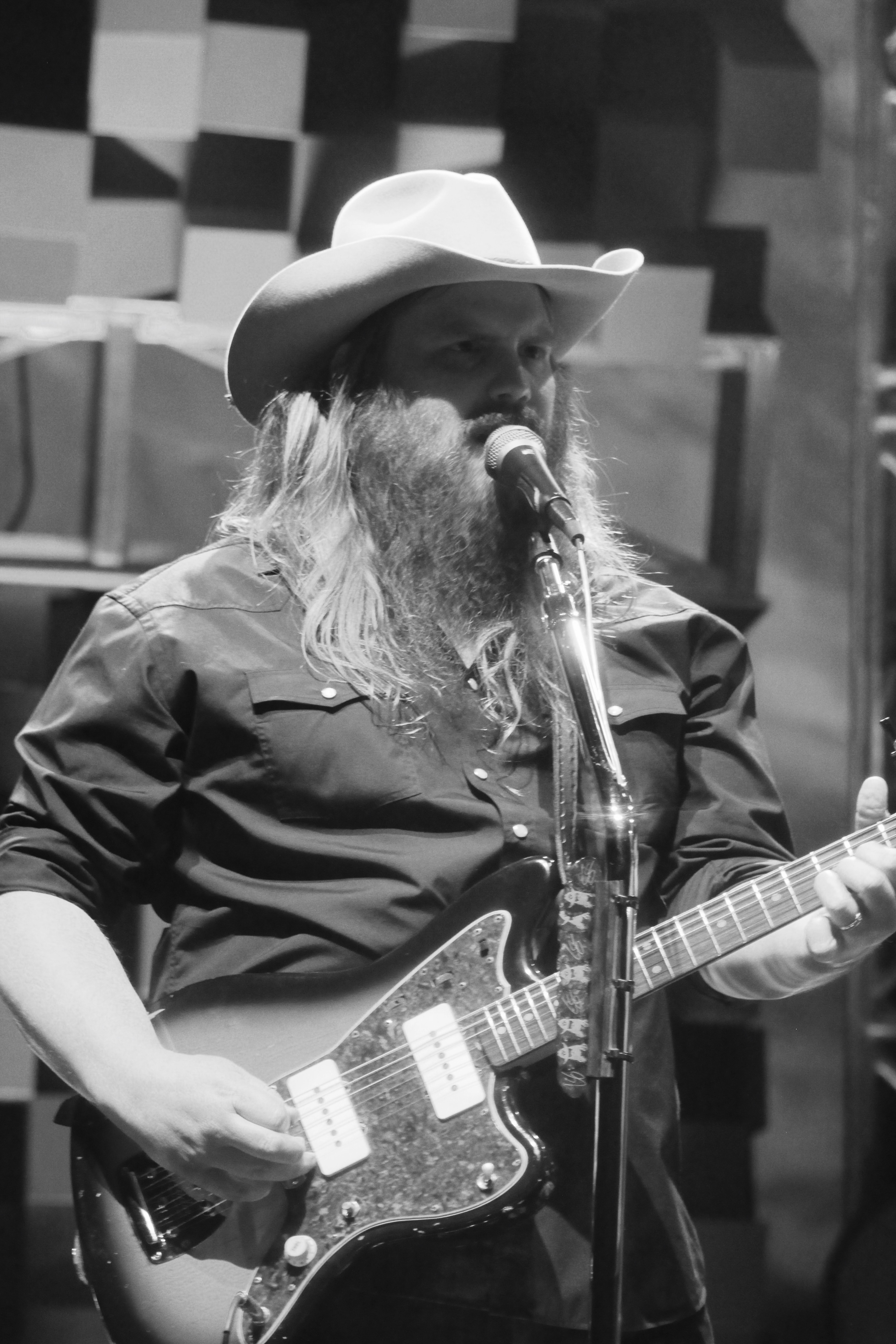
Three—time recipient Chris Stapleton.

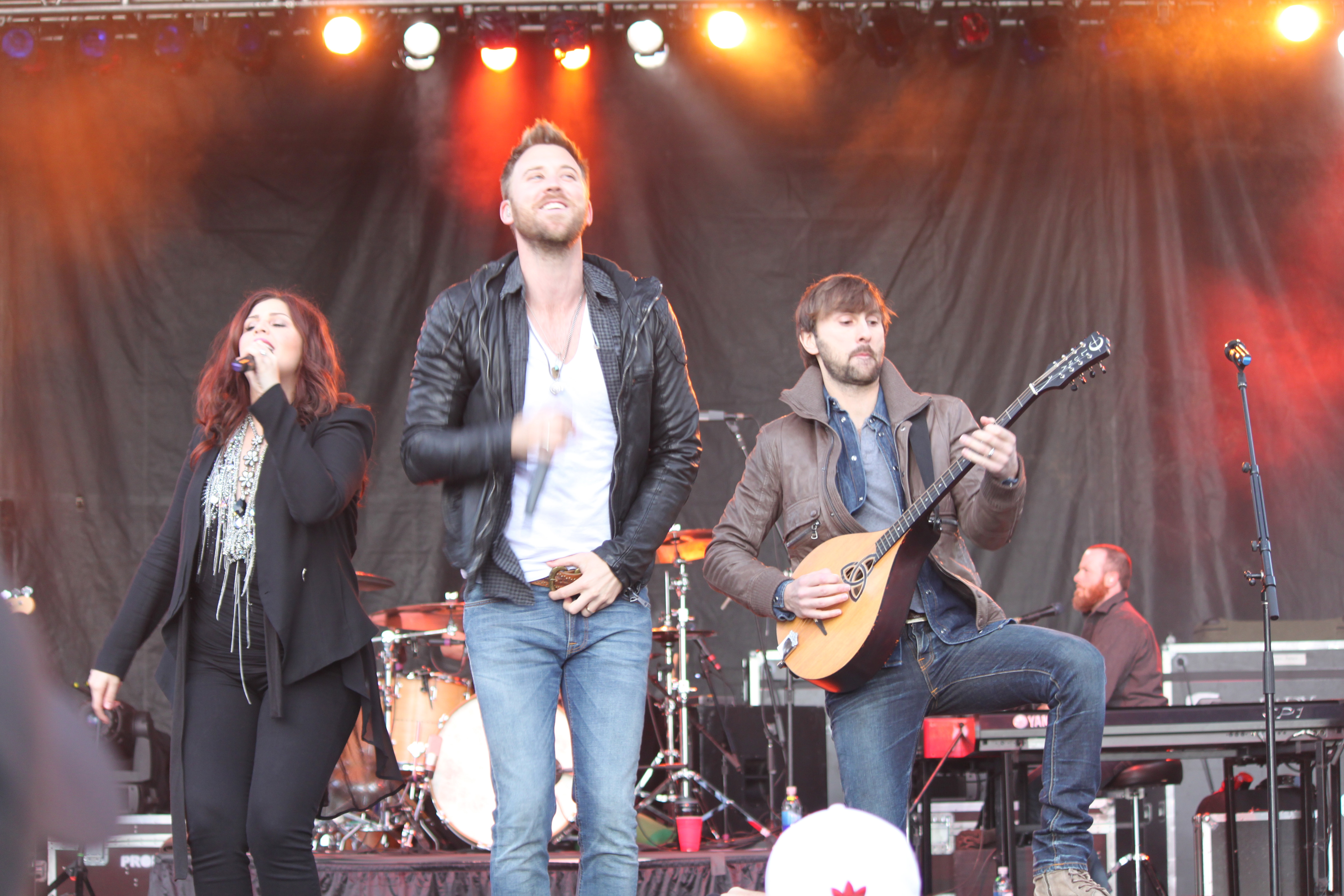
Two—time winners Lady Antebellum

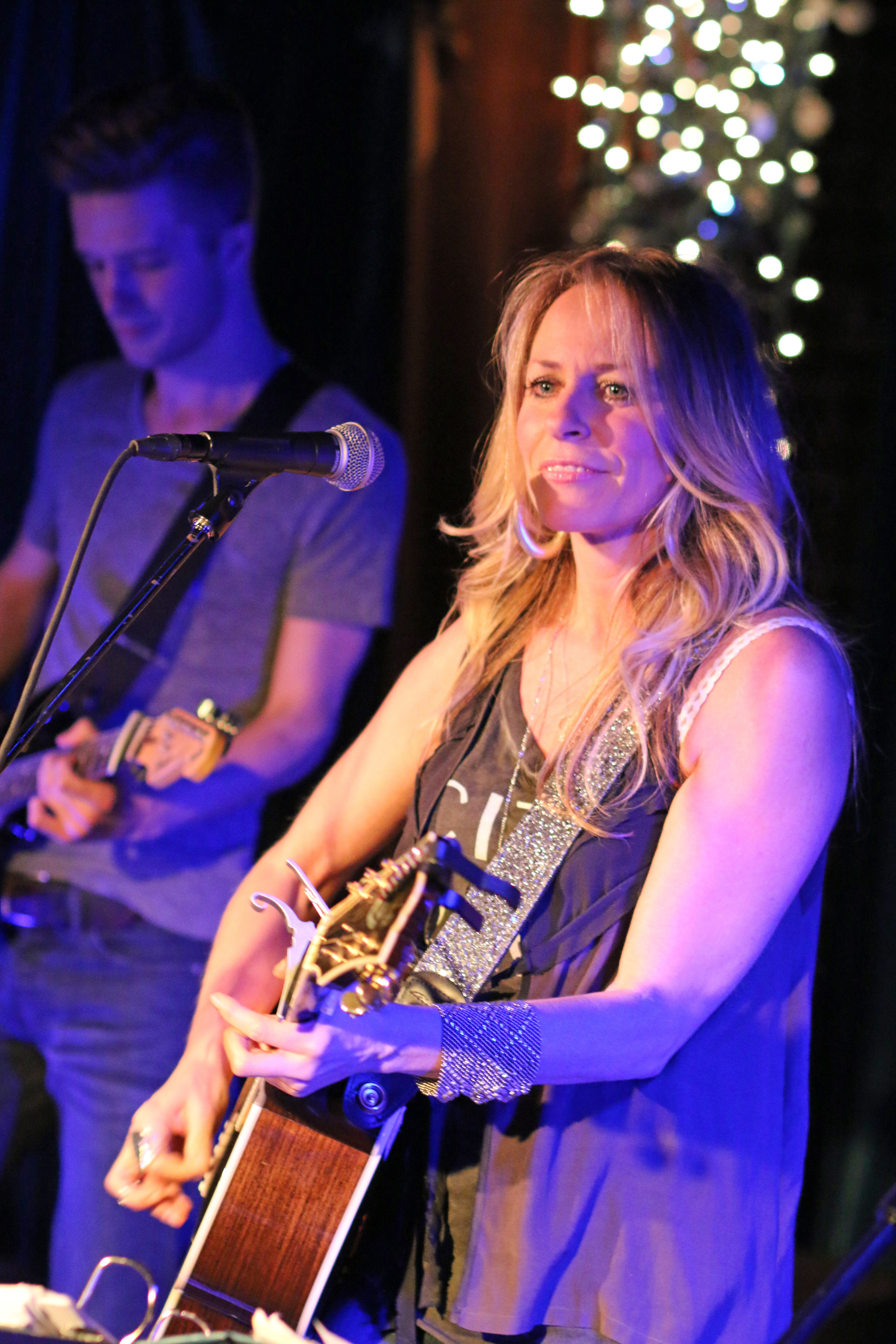
1997 winner Deana Carter

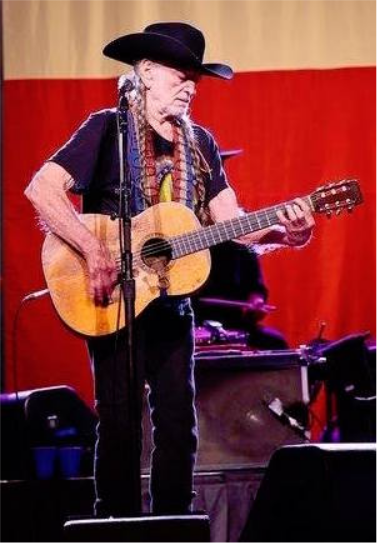
Two—time recipient Willie Nelson

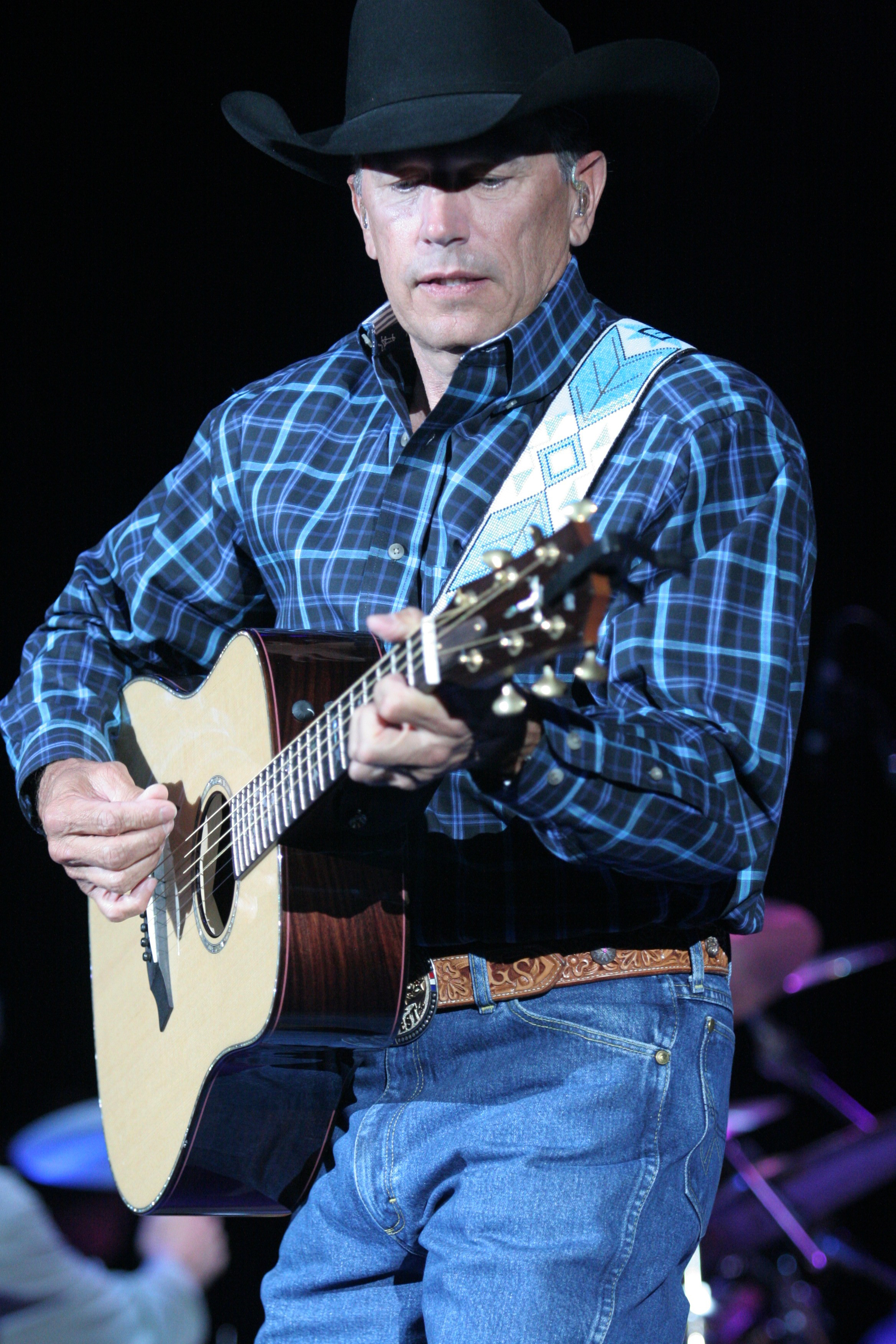
1996 and 2008 winner George Strait

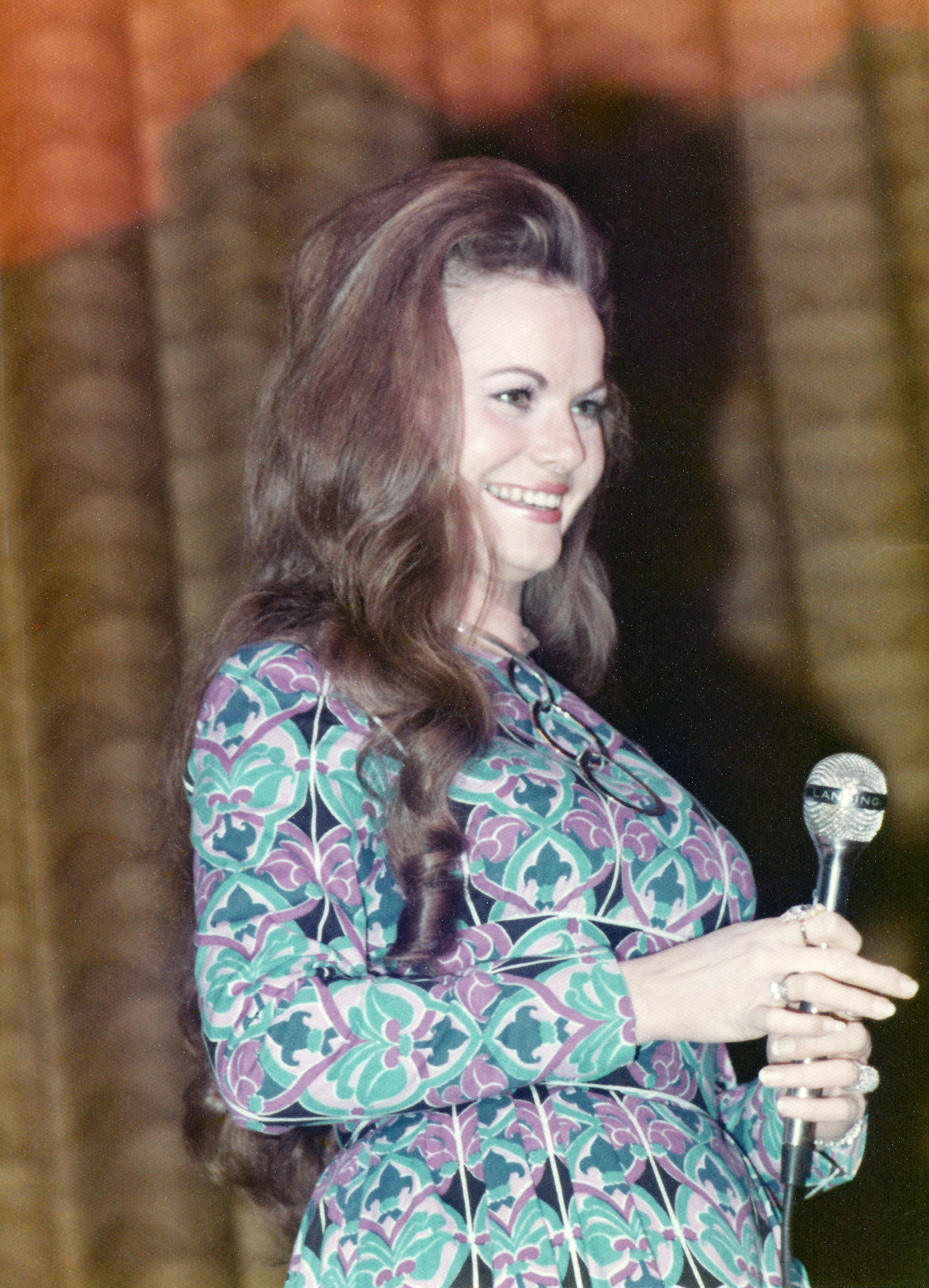
Jeannie C. Riley won the award in 1968

Year	Winner	Work	Nominees
2026	Ella Langley	“Choosin’ Texas”	"Be Her” — Ella Langley; "I Knew It, I Knew You” — Taylor Swift; “Somewhere Over Laredo” — Lainey Wilson; “The Fall” — Cody Johnson
2025	Ella Langley; Riley Green	“You Look Like You Love Me”	“4x4xU” — Lainey Wilson; “Ain't No Love In Oklahoma” — Luke Combs; ”Am I Okay?” — Megan Moroney; “I Never Lie” — Zach Top
2024	Chris Stapleton	"White Horse"	"A Bar Song (Tipsy)" — Shaboozey; "Watermelon Moonshine” — Lainey Wilson; "Dirt Cheap" — Cody Johnson; "I Had Some Help" — Post Malone (ft. Morgan Wallen)
2023	Luke Combs	"Fast Car"	"Heart Like a Truck" — Lainey Wilson; "Need a Favor" — Jelly Roll; "Next Thing You Know" — Jordan Davis; "Wait in the Truck — HARDY (ft. Lainey Wilson)
2022	Cody Johnson	"'Til You Can't"	"Buy Dirt" — Jordan Davis (ft. Luke Bryan); "Half of My Hometown" — Kelsea Ballerini (ft. Kenny Chesney); "Never Wanted to Be That Girl" — Carly Pearce and Ashley McBryde; "You Should Probably Leave" — Chris Stapleton
2021	Chris Stapleton	"Starting Over"	"Famous Friends" — Chris Young (ft. Kane Brown); "The Good Ones" — Gabby Barrett; "Hell of a View" — Eric Church; "One Night Standards" — Ashley McBryde
2020	Maren Morris	"The Bones"	"10,000 Hours" — Dan + Shay (ft. Justin Bieber); "Beer Never Broke My Heart" — Luke Combs; "Bluebird" — Miranda Lambert; "I Hope" — Gabby Barrett
2019	Blake Shelton	"God's Country"	"Burning Man" — Dierks Bentley (ft. Brothers Osborne); "Girl" — Maren Morris; "Millionaire" — Chris Stapleton; "Speechless" — Dan + Shay
2018	Chris Stapleton	"Broken Halos"	"Drinkin' Problem" — Midland; "Drowns the Whiskey" — Jason Aldean (ft. Miranda Lambert); "Meant to Be" — Bebe Rexha (ft. Florida Georgia Line); "Tequila" — Dan + Shay
2017	Keith Urban	"Blue Ain't Your Color"	"Better Man" — Little Big Town; "Body Like a Back Road" — Sam Hunt; "Dirt on My Boots" — Jon Pardi; "Tin Man" — Miranda Lambert
2016	Thomas Rhett	"Die a Happy Man"	"Humble and Kind" — Tim McGraw; "My Church" — Maren Morris; "Nobody to Blame" — Chris Stapleton; "Record Year" — Eric Church
2015	Little Big Town	"Girl Crush"	"American Kids — Kenny Chesney; "I Don't Dance" — Lee Brice; "Take Your Time" — Sam Hunt; "Talladega" — Eric Church
2014	Miranda Lambert	"Automatic"	"Drunk on a Plane" — Dierks Bentley; "Give Me Back My Hometown" — Eric Church; "Meanwhile Back at Mama's" — Tim McGraw (ft. Faith Hill); "Mine Would Be You" — Blake Shelton
2013	Florida Georgia Line	"Cruise"	"Highway Don't Care" — Tim McGraw (ft. Taylor Swift and Keith Urban); "Mama's Broken Heart" — Miranda Lambert; "Merry Go 'Round" — Kacey Musgraves; "Wagon Wheel" — Darius Rucker
2012	Little Big Town	"Pontoon"	"Dirt Road Anthem" — Jason Aldean; "God Gave Me You" — Blake Shelton; "Home" — Dierks Bentley; "Springsteen" — Eric Church
2011	The Band Perry	"If I Die Young"	"A Little Bit Stronger" — Sara Evans; "Colder Weather" — Zac Brown Band; "Don't You Wanna Stay" — Jason Aldean (ft. Kelly Clarkson); "Honey Bee" — Blake Shelton
2010	Lady Antebellum	"Need You Now"	"A Little More Country Than That" — Easton Corbin; "Hillbilly Bone" — Blake Shelton (ft. Trace Adkins); "The House That Built Me" — Miranda Lambert; "White Liar" — Miranda Lambert
2009	Lady Antebellum	"I Run to You"	"Chicken Fried" — Zac Brown Band; "In Color" — Jamey Johnson; "People Are Crazy" — Billy Currington; "Then" — Brad Paisley
2008	George Strait	"I Saw God Today"	"Don't Blink" — Kenny Chesney; "Gunpowder & Lead — Miranda Lambert; "Stay" — Sugarland; "You're Gonna Miss This" — Trace Adkins
2007	Carrie Underwood	"Before He Cheats"	"Anyway" — Martina McBride; "Lost in This Moment" — Big & Rich; "Ticks" — Brad Paisley; "Wrapped" — George Strait
2006	Brooks & Dunn	"Believe"	"Better Life — Keith Urban; "Jesus, Take the Wheel" — Carrie Underwood; "Summertime" — Kenny Chesney; "When I Get Where I'm Going" — Brad Paisley (ft. Dolly Parton)
2005	Lee Ann Womack	"I May Hate Myself in the Morning"	"Alcohol — Brad Paisley; "As Good as I Once Was" — Toby Keith; "Baby Girl" — Sugarland; "Bless the Broken Road" — Rascal Flatts
2004	Tim McGraw	"Live Like You Were Dying"	"I Love This Bar" — Toby Keith; "Redneck Woman" — Gretchen Wilson; "Remember When" — Alan Jackson; "Whiskey Lullaby" — Brad Paisley and Alison Krauss
2003	Johnny Cash	"Hurt"	"Beer for My Horses" — Toby Keith (ft. Willie Nelson); "Celebrity — Brad Paisley; "Have You Forgotten?" — Darryl Worley; "Three Wooden Crosses" — Randy Travis
2002	Alan Jackson	"Where Were You (When the World Stopped Turning)"	"Blessed" — Martina McBride; "Courtesy of the Red, White and Blue (The Angry American)" — Toby Keith; "Drive (For Daddy Gene)" — Alan Jackson; "I'm Gonna Miss Her (The Fishin' Song)" — Brad Paisley
2001	The Soggy Bottom Boys	"Man of Constant Sorrow"	"Ain't Nothing 'bout You" — Brooks & Dunn; "Born to Fly" — Sara Evans; "I'm Already There" — Lone Star; "One More Day" — Diamond Rio
2000	Lee Ann Womack; Sons of the Desert	"I Hope You Dance"	"Breathe" — Faith Hill; "Buy Me a Rose" — Kenny Rogers; "He Didn't Have to Be" — Brad Paisley; "How Do You Like Me Now?!" — Toby Keith
1999	Dixie Chicks	"Wide Open Spaces"	"Amazed" — Lonestar; "Choices" — George Jones; "Don't Laugh at Me" — Mark Wills; "Please Remember Me" — Tim McGraw
1998	Steve Wariner	"Holes in the Floor of Heaven"	"A Broken Wing" — Martina McBride; "I Just Want to Dance with You" — George Strait; "This Kiss" — Faith Hill; "You Don't Seem to Miss Me" — Patty Loveless (ft. George Jones)
1997	Deana Carter	"Strawberry Wine"	"All the Good Ones Are Gone" — Pam Tillis; "Carried Away" — George Strait; "It's Your Love" — Tim McGraw (ft. Faith Hill); "One Night at a Time" — George Strait
1996	George Strait	"Check Yes or No"	"Blue" — LeAnn Rimes; "Go Rest High on That Mountain" — Vince Gill; "My Maria" — Brooks & Dunn; "Time Marches On" — Tracy Lawrence
1995	Alison Krauss & Union Station	"When You Say Nothing at All"	"Any Man of Mine" — Shania Twain; "Baby Likes to Rock It" — The Tractors; "Gone Country" — Alan Jackson; "The Keeper of the Stars" — Tracy Byrd
1994	John Michael Montgomery	"I Swear"	"Does He Love You" — Reba McEntire and Linda Davis; "Don't Take the Girl" — Tim McGraw; "He Thinks He'll Keep Her" — Mary Chapin Carpenter; "How Can I Help You Say Goodbye" — Patty Loveless
1993	Alan Jackson	"Chattahoochee"	"Ain't That Lonely Yet" — Dwight Yoakam; "Don't Let Our Love Start Slippin' Away" — Vince Gill; "I Don't Need Your Rockin' Chair" — George Jones; "Two Sparrows in a Hurricane" — Tanya Tucker
1992	Billy Ray Cyrus	"Achy Breaky Heart"	"I Feel Lucky" — Mary Chapin Carpenter; "Look at Us" — Vince Gill; "Love, Me" — Collin Raye; "Maybe It Was Memphis" — Pam Tillis
1991	Garth Brooks	"Friends in Low Places"	"Don't Rock the Jukebox" — Alan Jackson; "Don't Tell Me What to Do" — Pam Tillis; "Here's a Quarter (Call Someone Who Cares)" — Travis Tritt; "Pocket Full of Gold" — Vince Gill
1990	Vince Gill	"When I Call Your Name"	"Here in the Real World" — Alan Jackson; "If Tomorrow Never Comes" — Garth Brooks; "Killin' Time" — Clint Black; "Where've You Been" — Kathy Mattea
1989	Keith Whitley	"I'm No Stranger to the Rain"	"A Better Man" — Clint Black; "After All This Time" — Rodney Crowell; "Chiseled in Stone" — Vern Gosdin; "I'll Leave This World Loving You" — Ricky Van Shelton
1988	Kathy Mattea	"Eighteen Wheels and a Dozen Roses"	"Do Ya" — K. T. Oslin; "I Told You So" — Randy Travis; "Somebody Lied" — Ricky Van Shelton; "Tennessee Flat Top Box" — Rosanne Cash
1987	Randy Travis	"Forever and Ever, Amen"	"All My Ex's Live in Texas" — George Strait; "Can't Stop My Heart from Loving You" — The O'Kanes; "The Right Left Hand" — George Jones; "Walk the Way the Wind Blows" — Kathy Mattea
1986	Dan Seals	"Bop"	"Grandpa (Tell Me 'Bout the Good Ol' Days)" — The Judds; "Nobody in His Right Mind Would've Left Her" — George Strait; "On the Other Hand" — Randy Travis; "Whoever's in New England" — Reba McEntire
1985	The Judds	"Why Not Me"	"Baby's Got Her Blue Jeans On" — Mel McDaniel; "Country Boy" — Ricky Skaggs; "Does Fort Worth Ever Cross Your Mind" — George Strait; "Highwayman" — The Highwaymen
1984	Anne Murray	"A Little Good News"	"Holding Her and Loving You" — Earl Thomas Conley; "Islands in the Stream" — Kenny Rogers and Dolly Parton; "Mama He's Crazy" — The Judds; "To All the Girls I've Loved Before" — Julio Iglesias and Willie Nelson
1983	John Anderson	"Swingin'"	"Heartbroke" — Ricky Skaggs; "I Always Get Lucky with You" — George Jones; "I.O.U." — Lee Greenwood; "Pancho and Lefty" — Merle Haggard and Willie Nelson
1982	Willie Nelson	"Always on My Mind"	"Crying My Heart Out Over You" — Ricky Skaggs; "I'm Gonna Hire a Wino to Decorate Our Home" — David Frizzell; "It Turns Me Inside Out" — Lee Greenwood; "Love in the First Degree" — Alabama
1981	Oak Ridge Boys	"Elvira"	"I Believe in You" — Don Williams; "I Was Country When Country Wasn't Cool" — Barbara Mandrell; "Old Flame" — Alabama; "Somebody's Knockin'" — Terri Gibbs
1980	George Jones	"He Stopped Loving Her Today"	"All the Gold in California" — Larry Gatlin and the Gatlin Brothers; "Coward of the County" — Kenny Rogers; "Good Ole Boys Like Me" — Don Williams; "In America" — Charlie Daniels Band
1979	Charlie Daniels Band	"The Devil Went Down to Georgia"	"Amanda" — Waylon Jennings; "If Loving You Is Wrong (I Don't Want to Be Right)" — Barbara Mandrell; "The Gambler" — Kenny Rogers; "You Needed Me" — Anne Murray
1978	The Kendalls	"Heaven's Just a Sin Away"	"Blue Bayou" — Linda Ronstadt; "Here You Come Again" — Dolly Parton; "Mammas Don't Let Your Babies Grow Up to Be Cowboys" — Waylon Jennings and Willie Nelson; "Take This Job and Shove It" — Johnny Paycheck
1977	Kenny Rogers	"Lucille"	"It Was Almost Like a Song" — Ronnie Milsap; "Luckenbach, Texas (Back to the Basics of Love)" — Waylon Jennings; "Margaritaville" — Jimmy Buffett; "Southern Nights" — Glen Campbell
1976	Waylon Jennings; Willie Nelson	"Good Hearted Woman"	"Convoy" — C. W. McCall; "Teddy Bear" — Red Sovine; "The Blind Man in the Bleachers" — Kenny Starr; "The Door Is Always Open" — Dave and Sugar
1975	Freddy Fender	"Before the Next Teardrop Falls"	"(Hey Won't You Play) Another Somebody Done Somebody Wrong Song" — B. J. Thomas; "I'm Not Lisa" — Jessi Colter; "Rhinestone Cowboy" — Glen Campbell; "Thank God I'm a Country Boy" — John Denver
1974	Cal Smith	"Country Bumpkin"	"As Soon as I Hang Up the Phone" — Conway Twitty and Loretta Lynn; "If You Love Me (Let Me Know)" — Olivia Newton—John; "The Most Beautiful Girl" — Charlie Rich; "The Streak" — Ray Stevens
1973	Charlie Rich	"Behind Closed Doors"	"(Old Dogs, Children and) Watermelon Wine" — Tom T. Hall; "Satin Sheets" — Jeanne Pruett; "The Lord Knows I'm Drinking" — Cal Smith; "Why Me" — Kris Kristofferson
1972	Donna Fargo	"The Happiest Girl in the Whole U.S.A."	"Four in the Morning" — Faron Young; "Kiss an Angel Good Mornin'" — Charley Pride; "One's on the Way" — Loretta Lynn; "To Get to You" — Jerry Wallace
1971	Sammi Smith	"Help Me Make It Through the Night"	"Amos Moses" — Jerry Reed; "Easy Loving" — Freddie Hart; "Rose Garden" — Lynn Anderson; "When You're Hot, You're Hot" — Jerry Reed
1970	Merle Haggard	"Okie from Muskogee"	"The Fightin' Side of Me" — Merle Haggard; "Hello Darlin'" — Conway Twitty; "(I'm So) Afraid of Losing You Again" — Charley Pride; "My Woman, My Woman, My Wife" — Marty Robbins
1969	Johnny Cash	"A Boy Named Sue"	"All I Have to Offer You (Is Me)" — Charley Pride; "Daddy Sang Bass" — Johnny Cash; "Galveston" — Glen Campbell; "Games People Play" — Freddy Weller
1968	Jeannie C. Riley	"Harper Valley PTA"	"By the Time I Get to Phoenix" — Glen Campbell; "D-I-V-O-R-C-E" — Tammy Wynette; "Folsom Prison Blues" — Johnny Cash; "Honey" — Bobby Goldsboro
1967	Jack Greene	"There Goes My Everything"	"Danny Boy" — Ray Price; "It's Such a Pretty World Today" — Wynn Stewart; "Ode to Billie Joe" — Bobbie Gentry; "The Fugitive" — Merle Haggard

== Artists with multiple wins ==
Artists that received multiple awards
Awards	Artist
3	Chris Stapleton
2	Alan Jackson
2	George Strait
2	Johnny Cash
2	Lady Antebellum
2	Lee Ann Womack
2	Little Big Town
2	Willie Nelson
2	Ella Langley

== Artists with multiple nominations ==
9 nominations

- George Strait

8 nominations

- Brad Paisley
- Miranda Lambert

7 nominations

- Alan Jackson
- Tim McGraw
- Willie Nelson (Note: Including one as a member of The Highwaymen.)

6 nominations

- George Jones

5 nominations

- Blake Shelton
- Chris Stapleton
- Eric Church
- Johnny Cash (Note: Including one as a member of The Highwaymen.)
- Kenny Rogers
- Toby Keith
- Vince Gill
- Lainey Wilson
- Waylon Jennings (Note: Including one as a member of The Highwaymen.)

4 nominations

- Faith Hill
- Glen Campbell
- Kenny Chesney
- Randy Travis

3 nominations

- Brooks & Dunn
- Charley Pride
- Cody Johnson
- Dan + Shay
- Dierks Bentley
- Dolly Parton
- Ella Langley
- Jason Aldean
- Kathy Mattea
- Keith Urban
- Little Big Town
- Maren Morris
- Martina McBride
- Pam Tillis
- Ricky Skaggs
- The Judds

2 nominations

- Alabama
- Alison Krauss
- Anne Murray
- Barbara Mandrell
- Cal Smith
- Carrie Underwood
- Charlie Daniels Band
- Charlie Rich
- Clint Black
- Conway Twitty
- Don Williams
- Florida Georgia Line
- Garth Brooks
- Jerry Reed
- Kris Kristofferson (Note: Including one as a member of The Highwaymen.)
- Lady Antebellum
- Lee Ann Womack
- Lee Greenwood
- Lonestar
- Loretta Lynn
- Luke Combs
- Mary Chapin Carpenter
- Merle Haggard
- Patty Loveless
- Reba McEntire
- Ricky Van Shelton
- Sam Hunt
- Sara Evans
- Sugarland
- Taylor Swift
- Trace Adkins
- Zac Brown Band
