= Helene Cronin =

American singer-songwriter

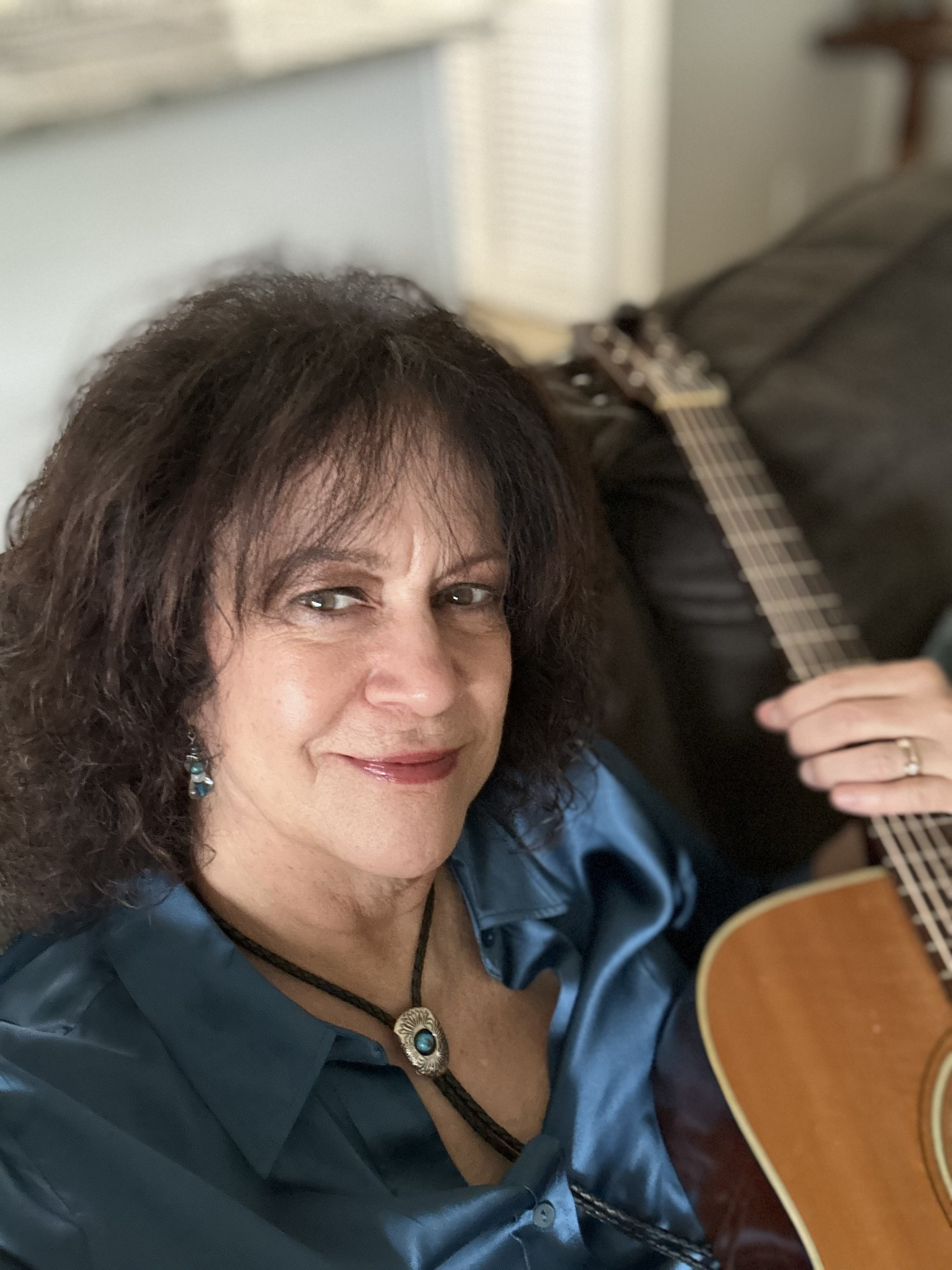
- Cronin in 2026

Background information
- Born: Rockville Centre, New York
- Origin: Dallas, Texas
- Genres: Americana, country, folk, rock
- Instruments: Vocal, guitar, piano
- Website: helenecronin.com

Helene Cronin (born in Rockville Centre, New York) is an American singer-songwriter recognized for her introspective lyrics and narrative songwriting. Based in Texas, she gained national attention as a winner of the 2018 New Folk Competition at the Kerrville Folk Festival. Cronin maintains an active presence in Nashville, where she regularly collaborates with other songwriters and records her music. Her work draws on folk, Americana, and country influences.

== Early life and education ==
Cronin grew up in a musical and artistic family; she has three brothers and one sister. Her first instrument was the piano at the age of six; she began teaching herself to play the guitar at the age of twelve. When Cronin was a child, the family moved to Texas.

In her youth, she was musically influenced by James Taylor, John Denver, Joni Mitchell, Shawn Colvin, Eagles, Carole King, Marc Cohn and Sting.

She graduated from the University of Colorado in Boulder, Colorado, with a degree in business administration with a focus on human resources and then worked in human resources and later as a real estate agent.

== Career ==
=== Until the year 2019 ===
By 2001 Cronin had recorded three contemporary Christian albums, including Living By Faith (1998) and In The Company Of Angels (2001). This period also saw the birth of her two daughters.

Since 2004, she has spent a lot of time in Nashville, Tennessee, refining her songwriting skills.

In 2010, Cronin's song Lucky Me was released on YouTube by her sister and became a success, followed by an appearance on Mike Huckabee's TV show. This reaffirmed Cronin's belief in herself as a writer.

In 2012, she decided to focus exclusively on her music and gave up her jobs. Since the following year, she has spent at least a week per month in Nashville to give concerts, play, record music and write songs with other songwriters for them and herself. The local presence is necessary because everything in the Nashville songwriting community is based on relationships—even if Cronin has to travel more than 600 miles to get there.

The next release came in 2014 with the EP Restless Heart, which was followed by the EP Belong to the River in 2015. The lyrics now dealt with life issues in general and the problems we all face.

In 2018, Cronin was declared a New Folk winner at the prestigious Kerrville Folk Festival. It is the longest continuously running music festival in the United States and attracts innovative songwriters and fans from all over the world; the six winners will be selected from 800 competitors.

In 2019, she began working with Matt King as a producer and the album Old Ghosts & Lost Causes was born, featuring five solo-written songs and six collaborations. The recordings involved some top-class studio musicians in Nashville such as Kenny Vaughan and Byron House, as well as sound engineer and Grammy award-winner Mitch Dane. It was a big step for Cronin to hire a band, go into a studio in Nashville and have a creative producer who raised the level of her work significantly. A review noted stylistic similarities between Cronin's work and that of Leonard Cohen.

=== From 2020 onwards ===
The award in Kerrville and the successful album initially gave Cronin considerable momentum in her career. However, during the COVID-19 pandemic, as concerts were hardly possible, she focused on songwriting and began writing around 40 to 60 songs a year. She then had more than enough songs to choose from for the album Landmarks (2023). King also encouraged her to sing with more bite and power—she had always thought of herself as a quiet, folky singer, and was now encouraged to use her voice to its full potential. With the exception of the drummer, the band consisted of the same artists as on the previous album. With 12 songs on the album – one written solo and eleven co-written – Cronin felt the need to return to writing on her own. After completing the record, she regained this focus by joining a songwriting prompt group with several Texas artists, where they wrote songs based on keywords or prompts.

At the end of 2023, Cronin's EP Beautiful December was released with six Christmas-themed songs.

The album Maybe New Mexico (2025) contains two solo-written songs and ten collaborations, with Scott Sean White being the most frequently represented. The songs were carefully selected by Cronin for their relevance to her live performances and their lasting impact. For the first time, she can also be heard on acoustic guitar.

The albums Landmarks and Maybe New Mexico were both partially financed by a Kickstarter campaign.

Cronin is active in the Americana, country, folk and rock genres. Her song lyrics are partly autobiographical, honest and authentic and all begin with some kind of real-life experience.

Some songs written or co-written by Cronin have also been recorded by other artists. In April 2026, the song Speaking Terms, written by Cronin and Joybeth Taylor, was released on Ella Langley’s album Dandelion; apart from cover versions and traditional songs, it is the only new song by outside songwriters on the album on which Langley was not credited as a writer. The track debuted at number 63 on the Billboard Hot 100 and number 22 on Hot Country Songs. Cronin’s song Over Missing You was recorded by Cody Johnson; she co-wrote Bryan Martin’s and Frank Foster’s Poets & Old Souls as well as Bryan Martin’s Cowboy in This Indian.

== Reception ==
John Apice wrote for Americana Highways that Cronin is worthy of being on any music lover's radar; there's nothing better than a song with a good story, melody and voice, and Ms. Cronin has the benefit of all three.

Jim Hynes wrote for Elmore Magazine that Cronin's terrific debut Old Ghosts & Lost Causes has something of Gretchen Peters' darkness and incisive poetry, and that alone should be more than enough for singer-songwriter fans to give Cronin their attention.

Stephen Rapid wrote on Lonesome Highway that Landmarks is a mature album with a balance between the central voice, the playing and the responsive production; it shows a solid growth since the debut album and that Cronin deserves to be viewed alongside some of her better know contemporaries as a contender.

Michael Macy wrote on Americana UK about Landmarks that Cronin has a true Americana voice, the drawl of Texas and twang of Nashville, and she would hit the right notes, emotionally and musically.

Lee Zimmerman wrote for Goldmine Magazine about Maybe New Mexico that it could be Cronin's masterpiece, and considering the fact that she has operated under the radar far too long, it should finally bring her the wider recognition she so decidedly deserves.

For Robert Christgau is Maybe New Mexico an A−, meaning that if you get into the music, you'll enjoy more than half of the tracks.

== Cronin's view ==
Cronin has described herself as a "story-singer", a term she uses to emphasize the narrative elements of her music. Critics have noted her focus on personal themes and emotional lyricism.

She has stated in interviews that her motivation to write stems from a personal passion for music rather than commercial ambition. She considers success to be audience connection and creating music that evokes emotional responses.

Cronin has stated that listeners often reinterpret her song Rifleman through their own experiences, which she sees as a form of emotional resonance.

She has noted that overcoming personal challenges has influenced her artistic development.

Cronin has expressed appreciation for the respect she has earned among peers and the recognition from emerging female artists.

== Personal life ==
Cronin lives with her husband in Dallas, Texas. She has two daughters.

== Discography (selection) ==
- Living By Faith (1998)
- In The Company Of Angels (2001)
- Restless Heart (EP, 2014)
- Belong to the River (EP, 2015)
- Old Ghosts & Lost Causes (2019)
- Landmarks (2023)
- Beautiful December (EP, 2023)
- Maybe New Mexico (2025)
