= Long Live Cowgirls =

Single by Ian Munsick with Cody Johnson

from the album White Buffalo
- Released: October 23, 2023
- Recorded: February 2021
- Genre: Country
- Length: 3:05
- Label: Warner Music Nashville
- Songwriters: Ian Munsick; Aby Gutierrez; Phil O'Donnell
- Producers: Ian Munsick; Jared Conrad

Ian Munsick singles chronology
"Long Haul" (2021)	"Long Live Cowgirls" (2023)	"Love Is Blind" (2026)

Cody Johnson singles chronology
"The Painter" (2023)	"Long Live Cowgirls" (2023)	"Dirt Cheap" (2024)

"Long Live Cowgirls" is a song by American country music singer Ian Munsick. Munsick co-wrote the song with Aby Gutierrez and Phil O'Donnell, and co-produced it with Jared Conrad. It was initially recorded as a duet with Cody Johnson and included on Munsick's second studio album, White Buffalo (2023). A solo version was later issued as a single to country radio in October 2023, though Johnson still received credit by Billboard when it charted.

== Background ==
Munsick co-wrote the song with Aby Gutierrez and Phil O'Donnell over a Zoom writing session in August or September 2020. O'Donnell came up with the song's title and the trio built the song around Western imagery to describe the "tough and desirable" nature of a cowgirl, both literally and metaphorically. In a February 2021 track session with a full band, Munsick co-produced the track with Jared Conrad, adding fiddle, banjo, and nylon-string guitar, and opening sound effects of burning logs and a distant coyote howl that provided a bridge between Munsick's new music and his debut effort, Coyote Cry.

After cutting the song, Munsick thought of pitching the idea of a duet to Cody Johnson. While touring together, Munsick's wife, Caroline, approached Johnson and sent him the track to listen to it, who responded favorably and told Munsick personally that he wanted to be on the song. The duet was released on January 28, 2022, as a promotional single, and was certified Gold by the RIAA on April 17, 2023.

Following the release of White Buffalo on April 7, 2023, the label decided to release "Long Live Cowgirls" to country radio as the album's lead single. However, due to scheduling conflicts with Johnson's own single "The Painter", a revised solo version was issued to country radio instead in October 2023.

== Charts ==
Weekly chart performance for "Long Live Cowgirls"
Chart (2023–2024)	Peak position
US Country Airplay (Billboard)	54

== Certifications ==
Certifications for "Long Live Cowgirls"
Region	Certification	Certified units/sales
United States (RIAA)	Platinum	1,000,000^{‡}
^{‡} Sales+streaming figures based on certification alone.
