= Leather (album) =

Studio album by Cody Johnson
- Released: November 3, 2023
- Genre: Country
- Length: 40:19
- Label: Warner Music Nashville
- Producer: Trent Willmon

Cody Johnson chronology
Human: The Double Album (2021)	Leather (2023)	Banks of the Trinity (2026)

Singles from Leather
- 1. "The Painter" Released: August 11, 2023; 2. "Dirt Cheap" Released: March 11, 2024; 3. "I'm Gonna Love You" Released: September 27, 2024; 4. "The Fall" Released: April 28, 2025

Leather is the ninth studio album and third major-label album by American country music singer Cody Johnson. It was released on November 3, 2023, via Warner Music Nashville, "The Painter" was issued in August 2023 as the lead single.

== Content ==
Johnson stated that the 12 tracks released on November 3, 2023, were the intended first part of a double album. The deluxe edition was released a year later on November 1, 2024, and included a set of 13 additional tracks. Johnson co-wrote three of the album's 25 tracks and it was produced by Trent Willmon.

== Critical reception ==
Professional ratings
Review scores
Source	Rating
Entertainment Focus	5/5 stars

Matt Bjorke of Roughstock wrote that "while Cody's uptempo gems are fantastic, he really shines on ballads where he can showcase his conversational storytelling vocals", highlighting "Whiskey Bent" with Jelly Roll and "Leather". Entertainment Focus's James Daykin felt that Johnson "delves into themes deeply rooted in country traditions, weaving tales of love, loss, resilience, and the enduring spirit of a cowboy" and called it "a cohesive and emotionally charged album".

Leather won Album of the Year at the 58th Annual Country Music Association Awards on November 20, 2024.

== Track listing ==
Leather track listing
No.	Title	Writer(s)	Length
1.	"Work Boots"	Jason Afable; Brett Beavers; Canaan Smith	2:49
2.	"Double Down"	Clint Daniels; Jeff Hyde; Adam James	3:09
3.	"Watching My Old Flame"	Daniels; Kat Higgins; Wynn Varble	3:24
4.	"That's Texas"	Erik Dylan; Wyatt McCubbin; Andy Sheridan	2:43
5.	"Dirt Cheap"	Josh Phillips	3:59
6.	"Jesus Loves You"	Michael Hardy; Mark Holman; Chase McGill	4:51
7.	"Whiskey Bent" (featuring Jelly Roll)	Rocky Block; James; Mikey Reaves	3:16
8.	"Leather"	Ian Munsick; Rivers Rutherford; Jeremy Spillman	3:13
9.	"People in the Back"	Devin Dawson; Austin Taylor Smith; Mark Trussell	2:39
10.	"Long Live Country Music" (featuring Brooks & Dunn)	Wade Kirby; Phil O'Donnell; Trent Willmon	3:24
11.	"The Painter"	Benjy Davis; Higgins; Ryan Larkins	3:31
12.	"Make Me a Mop"	Jessi Alexander; Connie Harrington; Allen Shamblin	3:16
Total length:			40:19

Deluxe edition disc two track listing
No.	Title	Writer(s)	Length
1.	"Overdue"	Marv Green; Jake Worthington	2:45
2.	"The Fall"	Ray Fulcher; Bobby Pinson; Jeremy Stover	3:17
3.	"How Do You Sleep at Night?"	Zach Abend; Nick Donley; Hardy; Ryan Hurd	3:13
4.	"Country Boy Singin' the Blues"	Johnson; Matt Rogers; Ben Stennis	3:52
5.	"Georgia Peaches"	Johnson; Jody Bartula; Jake Mears	3:53
6.	"Damn Good Life"	Alexander; Frank Rogers; Jonathan Singleton	3:16
7.	"C'mon Cowgirl"	Aby Gutierrez; James; Jonathan Stark	3:17
8.	"I Wished It Was You"	Abend; Troy Cartwright; Davis	4:03
9.	"Take It Like a Man"	Adam Craig; M. Rogers; Jordan Walker	2:48
10.	"I'm Gonna Love You" (with Carrie Underwood)	Chris Stevens; Kelly Archer; Travis Denning	3:08
11.	"Made in the USA"	Emily Falvey; James; Stennis	3:47
12.	"Over Missin' You"	Helene Cronin; Jesse Raub Jr.; Patrick Savage; Sean Scott White	3:28
13.	"The Mustang"	Johnson; Wesley Bayliss	4:56
Total length:			1:26:00

== Charts ==
=== Weekly charts ===
Weekly chart performance for Leather
Chart (2023)	Peak position
Australian Albums (ARIA)	88
Australian Country Albums (ARIA)	10
Canadian Albums (Billboard)	55
UK Album Downloads (OCC)	51
US Billboard 200	18
US Top Country Albums (Billboard)	5

=== Year-end charts ===
2024 year-end chart performance for Leather
Chart (2024)	Position
US Billboard 200	147
US Top Country Albums (Billboard)	30

2025 year-end chart performance for Leather
Chart (2025)	Position
US Billboard 200	110
US Top Country Albums (Billboard)	22

== Certifications ==
Certifications for "Leather"
Region	Certification	Certified units/sales
United States (RIAA)	Platinum	1,000,000^{‡}
^{‡} Sales+streaming figures based on certification alone.

== Accolades ==
Year-end lists
Publication	Rank	List
Billboard	3	The 10 Best Country Albums of 2024
