= White Buffalo: Voices of the West =

- Directed by: Cameron Mackey
- Written by: Ian Munsick
- Produced by: Ian Munsick; Caroline Munsick
- Production company: Warner Records Nashville
- Release date: 26 January 2024
- Running time: 49 minutes
- Country: United States
- Language: English

White Buffalo: Voices of the West is a 2024 documentary film by country musician Ian Munsick. It documents his home state of Wyoming and the relationship of the people in the area including ranchers, cowboys, and Indigenous people. The film was named Best Feature Documentary at the Angeles Film Festival and Best Documentary at the C47 Film Festival. It was also a selection at the Arizona International Film Festival, EQUUS International Film Festival, Kansas City FilmFest International and the Riverside International Film Festival to name a few. As of 2024, the documentary has been selected for 14 film festival and won a total of 13 awards.

== Premise ==
The documentary expands on the Western themes found in Ian Munsick's sophomore album, White Buffalo, released in 2023. It details his home state of Wyoming and the people who live there, as well as the white buffalo, a sacred symbol of the plains tribes of Native America. It displays the relationship between ranchers, cowboys, and the Indigenous people of the area. It includes interviews with Munsick and members of Crow and Blackfeet Nation.

== Cast ==
- Ian Munsick
- Dougie Hall
- Stephen Yellowtail
- Sammy Jo Bird
- Mouse Hall
- Wales Yellowtail
- Dave Munsick

== Release ==
The documentary original premiered at the Beverly Theater during the National Finals Rodeo in 2023. It was released on streaming platforms on January 26, 2024. It was also official selections and screen at other film festivals which include the Voices of the West Festival, Arizona International Film Festival, Bushwick Film Festival, Black Hills Film Festival, Kansas City Film Fest International Montana International Film Festival, Lost River Film Fest, NatiVisions Film Festival, RNCI Red Nation International Film Festival, Ridgway Independent Film Fest, Riverside International Film Festival, Seattle Film Festival, The Wild Bunch Film Festival, Wild West Film Festival, and the WYO Film Festival.

== Awards and recognition ==
In 2024, the Exclusive Tours of the Center of the West screened the documentary and created a special exhibition honoring the career of Ian Munsick. The exhibit featured 11 items that were considered "pivotal monments" in his career, including a suit he wore at the Grand Ole Opry debut, the boots he wore at Red Rocks, and a bolo that was given to him from Morgan Wallen. As of 2024, the documentary has been selected for 14 film festival and won a total of 13 awards.

- Angeles Film Festival – Best Feature Documentary
- C47 Film Festival – Best Documentary
- EQUUS International Film Festival - Best of Festival
- EQUUS International Film Festival - Best Documentary Feature
- EQUUS International Film Festival - Best Music Soundtrack
- EQUUS International Film Festival - Best Way of Horsemanship
- Telly Awards – Best Directing
- Telly Awards – Best Editing
- Telly Awards – Best Use of Music
- Telly Awards – Best Videography & Cinematography
- Telly Awards – Best Documentary: Long Form (Above 40 minutes)
- Telly Awards – DEI: Diversity, Equity & Inclusion
- Black Hills Festival - Best Documentary Feature Film
