= Ian Munsick =

American singer-songwriter

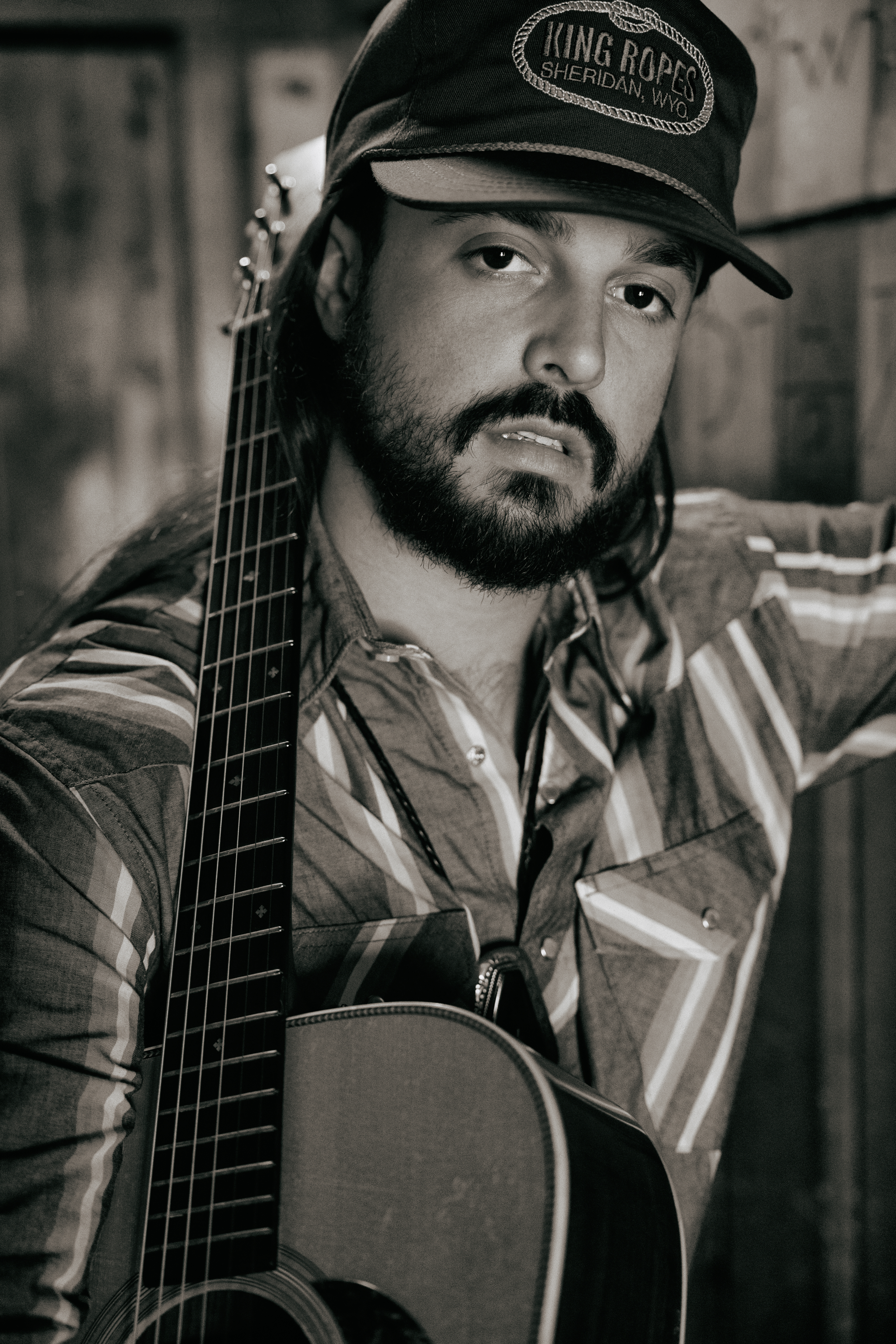
- Image of Ian Munsick from 2024.

Background information
- Born: May 6, 1993 (age 33); Sheridan, Wyoming, United States
- Genre: Country
- Occupation: Singer-songwriter
- Instruments: Vocals; guitar; piano; bass; mandolin
- Years active: 2017–present
- Label: Warner Music Nashville
- Website: www.ianmunsick.com

Ian Munsick (born May 6, 1993) is an American country music singer-songwriter from Sheridan, Wyoming signed to West to the Rest Records, partnered with Triple Tigers Records. He has released a self-titled EP and three studio albums, the second of which was the inspiration for his 2023 documentary film, White Buffalo: Voices of the West.

== Early life and education ==
Munsick was born and raised on ranches in Wyoming, which remains a major draw of inspiration for his music. His family is multiple generations of cowboys and ranchers as well as musicians, and he began performing alongside his father and two older brothers as The Munsick Boys at the age of 10. The group won "Group of the Year" at the 2017 Academy of Western Artists awards. Munsick attended high school in Colorado Springs, Colorado and graduated from Belmont University in Nashville, Tennessee with a degree in Songwriting and Music Business.

== Career ==
Munsick played as a bassist and sang background vocals for others after moving to Nashville. He released his self-titled EP in 2017, and he signed a solo record deal with Warner Music Nashville. "Long Haul" was issued as Munsick's debut single with the label on April 12, 2021, and served as the lead single to his debut studio album, Coyote Cry, which was released on February 26, 2021. He made his debut at the Grand Ole Opry, performing in October 2021.

His second studio album, White Buffalo, was released on April 7, 2023. It includes "Long Live Cowgirls", which was initially recorded as a duet with Cody Johnson and was certified Gold by the RIAA. A solo version was issued to country radio in October 2023, peaking at 54 on Billboard charts. On the album, he collaborated with Vince Gill on the song "Field of Dreams."

In 2024, Munsick released the documentary film, White Buffalo: Voices of the West. The documentary original premiered at the Beverly Theater during the National Finals Rodeo in 2023. It expands on the Western themes found in Munsick's sophomore album by displaying the relationship between ranchers, cowboys, and the Indigenous people of the area. During the film, Munsick has conversations with members of Crow and Blackfeet Nation. The film was named Best Feature Documentary at the Angeles Film Festival and Best Documentary at the C47 Film Festival. It was also a selection at the Arizona International Film Festival, EQUUS International Film Festival, Kansas City FilmFest International and the Riverside International Film Festival.

A year later, a deluxe version of the album was released titled White Buffalo: Introduce You to God with additional bonus tracks. His song "Long Haul" received RIAA gold certification in 2023, with this single "Horses Are Faster" receiving the same in 2024. In 2023, he wrote the title track for Cody Johnson's album, Leather, and also selected as an Opry NextStage artist the same year.

Munsick's third studio album, Eagle Feather, was released on April 18, 2025. It marked the third and final release for Munsick via Warner Music Nashville, as he chose to release music independently moving forward.

In January 2026, Munsick announced a partnership with Triple Tigers Records and his own West to the Rest Records, and released "Geronimo" on January 30, 2026. His first single under the partnership, "Love Is Blind", was released to country radio on April 20, 2026. It served as the lead single to Munsick's fourth studio album, The Mountain Goat, which will be released on August 21, 2026.

== Touring ==
In the first quarter of 2023, Munsick headlined "Long Live Cowgirls Tour," a tour named after his sophomore album. The same year, he headlined "The Buffalo Roams" tour Munsick began his "Boots, Buckles & Bolos" tour in January 2024. Later that year, he began his headline "Country & Western Tour" in 2024. During the tour, he sold out his first show at Red Rocks Amphitheatre in June the same year. During his career, Munsick has also toured alongside musicians such as Morgan Wallen, Lainey Wilson, and Cody Johnson.

=== Headline ===
- 2024, Country & Western Tour
- 2024, Boots, Buckles & Bolos Tour
- 2023, Long Live Cowgirls
- 2023, The Buffalo Roams

== Personal life ==
Munsick began dating his manager Caroline Rudolph, and welcomed their first child together, son Crawford, in February 2020. The couple married later that year in Montana, with the wedding footage being used for the music video to Munsick's "Me Against the Mountain".

== Discography ==
=== Studio albums ===
List of studio albums, with selected details, chart positions and sales
Title	Album details
Coyote Cry	Release date: February 26, 2021; Label: Warner Music Nashville; Format: CD, digital download, LP
White Buffalo	Release date: April 7, 2023; Label: Warner Music Nashville; Format: CD, digital download, LP
Eagle Feather	Release date: April 18, 2025; Label: Warner Music Nashville; Format: CD, digital download, LP
The Mountain Goat	Release date: August 21, 2026; Label: West to the Rest/Triple Tigers; Format: CD, digital download, LP

=== Extended plays ===
Title	EP details
Ian Munsick	Release date: 2017; Label: Independent; Formats: LP, CD, cassette

=== Singles ===
List of singles, with selected chart positions
Title	Year	Peak chart positions	Certifications	Album
Title	Year	US Country Airplay	Certifications	Album
"Long Haul"	2021	52	RIAA: Gold	Coyote Cry
"Long Live Cowgirls" (with Cody Johnson)	2023	54	RIAA: Platinum	White Buffalo
"Love Is Blind"	2026	37		The Mountain Goat

=== Other certified songs ===
Title	Year	Certifications	Album
"Horses Are Faster"	2017	RIAA: Gold	Ian Munsick - EP
