= The Fall (Cody Johnson song) =

2024 song by Cody Johnson

Single by Cody Johnson

from the album Leather
- Released: April 28, 2025
- Studio: Starstruck Studios (Nashville, Tennessee)
- Genre: Country
- Length: 3:17 (album version); 3:06 (radio edit)
- Label: Warner Music Nashville
- Songwriters: Bobby Pinson; Jeremy Stover; Ray Fulcher
- Producer: Trent Willmon

Cody Johnson singles chronology
"I'm Gonna Love You" (2024)	"The Fall" (2025)	"Horseback" (2026)

"The Fall" is a song by American country music singer Cody Johnson. It was sent to country radio on April 28, 2025 as the second single from the deluxe edition of his ninth studio album, Leather (2023). The song was written by Bobby Pinson, Jeremy Stover and Ray Fulcher and produced by Trent Willmon.

== Background ==
In 2021, Bobby Pinson came up with a line from the song's chorus, "The ride was worth the fall", which led to the next line, "The fall was worth the smiles". From there, the chorus was built with each line borrowing from the phrase of the previous. In the summer of that year, as the COVID-19 pandemic was resurging in Nashville, Tennessee, Pinson booked a writing session with Jeremy Stover and Ray Fulcher on Zoom. At the time, Fulcher was signed to Black River Entertainment as an artist and was about to head out on a radio promotion tour. Unsure if he would ever have the opportunity to write again, he told his co-writers that since the current chapter of his career was possibly coming to an end, he wanted to close it out with a meaningful song. Fulcher loved the film 8 Seconds as a kid and the writers decided to turn his personal interest into a message that can resonate universally. They subtly referenced rodeo, the topic of the movie, without using obvious words.

They first worked on the chorus, crafting a melody that matched the idea of the lyrics. The lines would progress musically, with each one peaking a half or whole step higher than the previous. The chorus reached a crescendo about three-quarters through, then subsided in intensity and ended by repeating the opening line, with the melody going into a minor chord. The writers then turned their attention to the verses, where they similarly used a minor chord to convey a dark tone as the protagonist confesses to his failings. In the first verse, consisting of concepts of hardship that were not directly related to rodeo, the melody was composed such that it almost sounded bouncy in the fourth and fifth lines, before returning to a serious tone. The final line of the verse, "even when I fell off", was written to set up the chorus.

While Fulcher was on radio tour, Pinson and Stover produced a demo of the song that reached Trent Willmon, who felt it was reminiscent of "The Dance" by Garth Brooks "but in a little more cowboy sort of language." Cody Johnson loved it as well and has stated:

When I heard the song, it sounded like the story of a lot of different people. It is kind of cowboy, and it is authentic to me, as "The ride was worth the fall," you know. "I'd climb back on again." But it also has this relativity to a lot of other different people and their story. It's a very unique thing that I couldn't ignore.

Although Johnson was still "on the fence" about the song, not wanting it to sound like a follow-up to his song "'Til You Can't", Willmon encouraged him to record it. They did it at the Starstruck Studios in Nashville with a band that included drummer Jerry Roe, bassist Mike Brignardello (of Giant), keyboardist Jim "Moose" Brown, acoustic guitarist Tim Galloway, steel guitarist Scotty Sanders and electric guitarists James Mitchell and Justin Ostrander. The demo was a good foundation, but Johnson asked them to slightly slow down the tempo and play with a tougher attitude. He said:

It needed that kind of "pump your chest out and be proud" aspect. When we explained that to the band, I'd been kind of playing with the little acoustic riff at the beginning. Obviously, the players that played on the track were better than me, so they took it and ran with it.

In the process of revising the track, they replaced the bridge with Ostrander's solo, with Johnson singing in a loud and strong voice. Fiddler Jenee Fleenor overdubbed many parts, creating a string section, while Willmon and Greg Barnhill provided backing vocals. The song became a fan favorite at concerts.

== Composition ==
The song is a "haunting, plaintive" ballad in which Cody Johnson discusses personal failures, such as alcohol abuse, arrogance, and struggling to live up to the expectations of his loved ones, church and society. During the chorus, over an instrumentation of pedal steel guitar, fiddles and acoustic guitars, Johnson concludes that he would not change what he had done, having decided that his positive experiences outweighed his negative ones.

== Live performances ==
Cody Johnson performed the song at 60th Academy of Country Music Awards on May 8, 2025.

== Music video ==
The music video for "The Fall" was released on October 17, 2025. The video was directed by Dustin Haney and stars Cody Webster.

== Charts ==
=== Weekly charts ===
Weekly chart performance for "The Fall"
Chart (2025–2026)	Peak position
Canada Hot 100 (Billboard)	62
Canada Country (Billboard)	38
UK Country Airplay (Radiomonitor)	1
US Billboard Hot 100	26
US Country Airplay (Billboard)	1
US Hot Country Songs (Billboard)	7

=== Year-end charts ===
Year-end chart performance for "The Fall"
Chart (2025)	Position
US Hot Country Songs (Billboard)	92

== Certifications ==
Certifications for "The Fall"
Region	Certification	Certified units/sales
United States (RIAA)	Platinum	1,000,000^{‡}
^{‡} Sales+streaming figures based on certification alone.
