= 'Til You Can't =

2021 single by Cody Johnson

Single by Cody Johnson

from the album Human: The Double Album
- B-side: "Longer Than She Did"
- Released: October 18, 2021
- Genre: Country
- Length: 3:44
- Label: Warner Music Nashville
- Songwriters: Ben Stennis; Matt Rogers
- Producer: Trent Willmon

Cody Johnson singles chronology
"Dear Rodeo" (2020)	"'Til You Can't" (2021)	"Human" (2022)

Music video
- "'Til You Can't on YouTube

"'Til You Can't" is a song by American country music singer Cody Johnson. It was released on October 18, 2021, as the lead single from his eighth studio album, Human: The Double Album. The song was written by Ben Stennis and Matt Rogers, and produced by Trent Willmon.

The song won the Country Music Association Award for Single of the Year and Video of the Year at the 56th Annual Country Music Association Awards in 2022 and the Grammy Award for Best Country Song at the 65th Annual Grammy Awards in 2023. It was notably covered by Kid Rock during the All-American Halftime Show in 2026.

== Content ==
In a press release, Johnson stated that the song conveys a message of "optimism and focus on perseverance," saying: "In our world today, we could use more positivity."

== Music video ==
The music video was released on October 15, 2021. It includes scenes of "fishing excursions, classic-car rebuilding sessions, family dinners" interspersed with footage of "Johnson delivering a fiery solo performance of the song". Johnson said: "I love the story line in the video. You think it's going in one direction and then suddenly you are surprised at the turn of events. When they sent me the rough edit of the video it was so powerful and brought tears to my eyes. It put into perspective the song that I had been singing for months."

The video also won Video of the Year at the Country Music Association Awards in 2022.

== Commercial performance ==
"'Til You Can't" debuted at number 42 on the Billboard Hot Country Songs chart dated June 26, 2021. After the album was released, it climbed to number 24 on the chart dated October 23, 2021.

== Covers ==
American musician Kid Rock would first cover the song during the All-American Halftime Show . He would later release a studio version as the lead single for his album Halfway 2 Jesus. This version would reach #69 on the Billboard Hot 100.

== Charts ==
=== Weekly charts ===
Weekly chart performance for "'Til You Can't"
Chart (2021–2022)	Peak position
Canada Hot 100 (Billboard)	26
Canada Country (Billboard)	1
Global 200 (Billboard)	141
US Billboard Hot 100	18
US Country Airplay (Billboard)	1
US Hot Country Songs (Billboard)	1

=== Year-end charts ===
2022 year-end chart performance for "'Til You Can't"
Chart (2022)	Position
Canada (Canadian Hot 100)	82
US Billboard Hot 100	34
US Country Airplay (Billboard)	3
US Hot Country Songs (Billboard)	3

=== Kid Rock version ===
Weekly chart performance for "'Til You Can't"
Chart (2026)	Peak position
US Billboard Hot 100	69
US Hot Christian Songs (Billboard)	1
US Hot Country Songs (Billboard)	14
US Hot Rock & Alternative Songs (Billboard)	9

== Certifications ==
Certifications for "'Til You Can't"
Region	Certification	Certified units/sales
Australia (ARIA)	Platinum	70,000^{‡}
Canada (Music Canada)	3× Platinum	240,000^{‡}
New Zealand (RMNZ)	Platinum	30,000^{‡}
United Kingdom (BPI)	Silver	200,000^{‡}
United States (RIAA)	6× Platinum	6,000,000^{‡}
^{‡} Sales+streaming figures based on certification alone.

== Release history ==
Release history for "'Til You Can't"
Region	Date	Format	Label	Ref.
Various	October 8, 2021	Digital download; streaming	Warner Music Nashville	
United States	October 18, 2021	Country radio	Warner Music Nashville	
