= Human: The Double Album =

Studio album by Cody Johnson
- Released: October 8, 2021
- Genre: Country
- Length: 61:45
- Label: Warner Music Nashville
- Producer: Trent Willmon

Cody Johnson chronology
Ain't Nothin' to It (2019)	Human: The Double Album (2021)	Leather (2023)

Singles from Human: The Double Album
- 1. "'Til You Can't" Released: October 18, 2021; 2. "By Your Grace" Released: April 1, 2022; 3. "Human" Released: June 6, 2022

Human: The Double Album is the eighth studio album and second major label album by American country music singer Cody Johnson. It was released in October 2021 via Warner Music Nashville. The album contains eighteen tracks on two separate discs. The lead single from the album is "'Til You Can't".

== Content ==
Johnson was inspired to write songs about the rodeo after the commercial success of "Dear Rodeo", a duet with Reba McEntire. He sought songwriters that, according to Billboard, were "familiar with the song structures and styles of songwriting popular with ‘90s country music." In advance of the album's release, "'Til You Can't" was selected as the lead single and was released to country radio in October 2021.

== Critical reception ==
Rating it 4 out of 5 stars, Stephen Thomas Erlewine wrote for AllMusic that "Johnson's emotional facility helps enliven a record that sticks to straight-ahead red dirt country, an album that doesn't deviate from familiar country tropes yet stays fresh thanks to Johnson's unfussy, unhurried execution."

== Track listing ==
Disc 1
No.	Title	Writer(s)	Length
1.	"Human"	Tony Lane; Travis Meadows	3:41
2.	"Honky Tonk Hardwood Floors"	Carson Chamberlain; Michael White; Wyatt McCubbin	3:19
3.	"Sad Songs and Waltzes" (with Willie Nelson)	Willie Nelson	3:32
4.	"'Til You Can't"	Matthew J. Rogers; Ben Stennis	3:44
5.	"God Bless the Boy"	Barrett Baber; Terri Jo Box; Scott Sean White	3:26
6.	"Known for Loving You"	Cody Johnson; Ben Hayslip; Trent Willmon	2:45
7.	"Driveway"	Rogers; Lindsay Rimes	2:47
8.	"Son of a Ramblin' Man"	Vince Gill	3:12
9.	"I Always Wanted To"	Tom Douglas; Allen Shamblin; Jordyn Shellhart	5:01

Disc 2
No.	Title	Writer(s)	Length
1.	"I Don't Know a Thing About Love (The Moon Song)"	Harlan Howard	3:42
2.	"Longer Than She Did"	Eric Paslay; Matt Stell; Paul Sikes	3:18
3.	"Made a Home"	Johnson; Jesse Raub Jr.; S. S. White	3:25
4.	"Let's Build a Fire"	Chris Janson; Mitch Oglesby	2:56
5.	"When It Comes to You"	Jeremy Bussey; Tony Lane	3:36
6.	"Treasure"	Rogers	3:14
7.	"Stronger"	Willmon; Jared Elledge; Dustin Miller	3:14
8.	"Cowboy Scale of 1 to 10" (featuring Dale Brisby, Corb Lund, Ned LeDoux and Red Steagall)	Johnson; Willmon; David Frasier	2:55
9.	"By Your Grace"	Johnson	3:58

== Charts ==
=== Weekly charts ===
Weekly chart performance for Human: The Double Album
Chart (2021)	Peak position
US Billboard 200	19
US Top Country Albums (Billboard)	3

=== Year-end charts ===
2022 year-end chart performance for Human: The Double Album
Chart (2022)	Position
US Billboard 200	167
US Top Country Albums (Billboard)	13

2023 year-end chart performance for Human: The Double Album
Chart (2023)	Position
US Top Country Albums (Billboard)	33

== Certifications ==
Certifications for Human: The Double Album
Region	Certification	Certified units/sales
Canada (Music Canada)	Gold	40,000^{‡}
United States (RIAA)	Platinum	1,000,000^{‡}
^{‡} Sales+streaming figures based on certification alone.
