= Ain't Nothin' to It =

Studio album by Cody Johnson
- Released: January 18, 2019
- Genre: Country
- Length: 52:21
- Label: Warner Music Nashville
- Producer: Trent Willmon

Cody Johnson chronology
Gotta Be Me (2017)	Ain't Nothin' to It (2019)	Human: The Double Album (2021)

Singles from Ain't Nothin' to It
- 1. "On My Way to You" Released: August 10, 2018; 2. "Nothin' On You" Released: July 22, 2019; 3. "Dear Rodeo" Released: September 8, 2020

Ain't Nothin' to It is a 2019 studio album by American country music singer Cody Johnson. Released on Warner Music Nashville, the album is Johnson's major label debut and his seventh overall album following six self-released projects.

== Content ==
Johnson signed to Warner Music Nashville in June 2018. The album is his first release for the label, after six independent albums.

As with all of his previous albums, the title track was co-written by David Lee. "On My Way to You" is the lead single. Included are two cover songs: "Long Haired Country Boy", originally by Charlie Daniels, and "Husbands and Wives", which has been recorded by Roger Miller, David Frizzell and Shelly West, and Brooks & Dunn. Trent Willmon is the album's producer.

== Critical reception ==
Giving it 4 out of 5 stars, Stephen Thomas Erlewine of AllMusic stated that "Its blend of classic hardwood honky tonk with a modern sensibility feels assured, the songs are designed to withstand the road, and Johnson feels casually confident in his delivery."

== Commercial performance ==
Ain't Nothin' to It debuted at No. 1 on Billboard's Top Country Albums chart with 23,000 copies sold (35,000 in album-equivalent units). The album has sold 63,500 copies in the United States as of March 2020.

== Track listing ==
No.	Title	Writer(s)	Length
1.	"Ain't Nothin' to It"	David Lee; Leslie Satcher	3:22
2.	"Noise"	Radney Foster; Jim McCormick; Gordie Sampson	3:09
3.	"Fenceposts"	Robert Arthur; Benji Davis	2:57
4.	"Understand Why"	Neil Medley; Randy Montana	3:10
5.	"Long Haired Country Boy" (featuring The Rockin' CJB)	Charlie Daniels	4:17
6.	"Nothin' on You"	Barrett Baber; Trent Willmon	4:20
7.	"Honky Tonk Mood"	Al Anderson; Chris Stapleton	3:13
8.	"Monday Morning Merle"	Bart Butler; Lance Miller; Brad Warren; Brett Warren	3:49
9.	"Y'all People (Dedicated to the 'CoJo Nation')"	Chase McGill; John Osborne; Laura Veltz	3:08
10.	"Where Cowboys Are King"	Carlton Anderson; Brice Long; Wynn Varble	3:04
11.	"On My Way to You"	Brett James; Tony Lane	3:33
12.	"Doubt Me Now"	Casey Beathard; Mitch Oglesby	3:03
13.	"Dear Rodeo"	Dan Couch; Cody Johnson	4:14
14.	"Husbands and Wives" (Live) (Bonus track)	Roger Miller	2:48
15.	"His Name Is Jesus" (Live) (Bonus track)	Johnson	4:14
Total length:			52:21

== Personnel ==
Musicians

- Jody Bartula – electric guitar (track 5); background vocals, fiddle (5, 14, 15)
- Jim "Moose" Brown – keyboards (tracks 1, 4, 7–10, 12, 13), organ (1, 2, 4, 6–13), Wurlitzer (1, 4, 7–10, 12, 13), piano (unspecified tracks)
- J.T. Corenflos – electric guitar (tracks 1, 4, 7–10, 12, 13)
- Jenee Fleenor – fiddle (tracks 1, 4, 7, 9–12
- Wes Hightower – background vocals (tracks 1, 4, 8, 10)
- Cody Johnson – lead vocals (all tracks), acoustic guitar (tracks 4, 5, 14, 15)
- Doug Kahan – upright bass (track 3), bass guitar (10)
- Alison Krauss – background vocals, fiddle (track 3)
- Jake Mears – electric guitar (track 5); background vocals, Dobro (14, 15)
- Carl Miner – acoustic guitar (tracks 1–4, 6–13), banjo (1, 3), mandolin (3), classical guitar (11), resonator guitar (12)
- James Mitchell – electric guitar (tracks 2, 6, 11)
- Morgan Myles – background vocals (track 6)
- Billy Nobel – keyboards (tracks 2, 6, 11); Hammond B-3 organ, piano (unspecified tracks)
- Justin Ostrander – electric guitar (tracks 2, 6, 7, 9, 13)
- Brian Pruitt – drums (tracks 1–4, 6–13), percussion (1, 2, 4, 7–13)
- Joey Pruski – bass guitar (track 5)
- Scotty Sanders - steel guitar, lap steel guitar (tracks 1, 2, 4, 6–13); Dobro (3)
- Adam Shoenfeld – electric guitar (tracks 1–4, 6–13)
- Jimmie Lee Sloas – bass guitar (tracks 1–4, 6–9, 11–13)
- Miles Stone – drums (track 5)
- Russell Terrell – background vocals (tracks 2, 11–13)
- Trent Willmon – background vocals (tracks 2, 5, 7, 9), electric guitar (9)

Technical

- Jack Clarke – mixing (all tracks), engineering (tracks 1–13)
- Lyndon Hughes – engineering (tracks 14, 15)
- Andrew Mendelson – mastering
- Todd Tidwell – engineering assistance (tracks 1–13)
- Trent Willmon – production

Visuals

- Mike Moore – art direction, design
- Cameron Powell – photography
- Shane Tarleton – creative direction

== Charts ==
=== Weekly charts ===
Chart (2019)	Peak position
US Billboard 200	9
US Top Country Albums (Billboard)	1

=== Year-end charts ===
Chart (2019)	Position
US Top Country Albums (Billboard)	39

== Certifications ==
Region	Certification	Certified units/sales
United States (RIAA)	Platinum	1,000,000^{‡}
^{‡} Sales+streaming figures based on certification alone.
