= The Painter (song) =

2023 single by Cody Johnson

Single by Cody Johnson

from the album Leather
- Released: August 11, 2023
- Genre: Country
- Length: 3:31
- Label: Warner Nashville
- Songwriters: Benjy Davis; Kat Higgins; Ryan Larkins
- Producer: Trent Willmon

Cody Johnson singles chronology
"Human" (2022)	"The Painter" (2023)	"Long Live Cowgirls" (2023)

Music video
- "The Painter" on YouTube

"The Painter" is a song by American country music singer Cody Johnson, released on August 11, 2023, as the lead single from his third major-label studio album Leather. It was written by Benjy Davis, Kat Higgins and Ryan Larkins and produced by Trent Willmon.

== Background ==
Cody Johnson announced the single in an interview with iHeartRadio's Spencer Graves in July 2023, which was set to be sent to country radio (including WLCY-FM) on August 14. Prior to its release, he teased the song on Instagram with a video of him and his wife Brandi dancing in a field, and later with a video of black and white photos highlighting moments of their relationship which ends with a color photo of their family. Johnson has said his favorite lyric in the song is "For every wall I built, she saw a canvas", adding "If there's anything that describes my marriage with my wife, Brandi, it's that line."

The song is a tribute to Brandi, in which Johnson describes the qualities he loves about her.

== Music video ==
The music video for "The Painter" premiered on January 19, 2024. It was directed by Dustin Haney and features scenes shot on Johnson's ranch in Texas alongside his wife Brandi.

== Charts ==
=== Weekly charts ===
Weekly chart performance for "The Painter"
Chart (2023–2024)	Peak position
Canada Hot 100 (Billboard)	55
Canada Country (Billboard)	1
New Zealand Hot Singles (RMNZ)	27
UK Country Airplay (Radiomonitor)	1
US Billboard Hot 100	25
US Country Airplay (Billboard)	1
US Hot Country Songs (Billboard)	7

=== Year-end charts ===
2024 year-end chart performance for "The Painter"
Chart (2024)	Position
US Billboard Hot 100	98
US Country Airplay (Billboard)	20
US Hot Country Songs (Billboard)	29

== Certifications ==
Certifications for "The Painter"
Region	Certification	Certified units/sales
Australia (ARIA)	Gold	35,000^{‡}
Canada (Music Canada)	Platinum	80,000^{‡}
United States (RIAA)	3× Platinum	3,000,000^{‡}
^{‡} Sales+streaming figures based on certification alone.
