= Human (Cody Johnson song) =

2022 single by Cody Johnson

Single by Cody Johnson

from the album Human: The Double Album
- Released: June 22, 2022
- Genre: Country
- Length: 3:41
- Label: Warner Nashville
- Songwriters: Travis Meadows; Tony Lane
- Producer: Trent Willmon

Cody Johnson singles chronology
"By Your Grace" (2022)	"Human" (2022)	"The Painter" (2023)

"Human" is a song written by Travis Meadows and Tony Lane, and recorded by American country music singer Cody Johnson. It was released to country radio on June 6, 2022 as the second single (third overall) from Johnson's 2021 album Human: The Double Album.

== Content ==
Travis Meadows and Tony Lane wrote "Human". Although Cody Johnson did not write the song, he told WJBD-FM disc jockeys that he considered it his "most autobiographical" song.

On April 2, 2023, Johnson performed "Human" on the CMT Music Awards. Grace Lenehan Vaughn of Taste of Country noted the "traditional" sound of Johnson's performance.

== Chart performance ==
=== Weekly charts ===
Weekly chart performance for "Human"
Chart (2022–2023)	Peak position
Canada Hot 100 (Billboard)	72
Canada Country (Billboard)	3
US Billboard Hot 100	61
US Country Airplay (Billboard)	8
US Hot Country Songs (Billboard)	15

=== Year-end charts ===
Year-end chart performance for "Human"
Chart (2023)	Position
US Country Airplay (Billboard)	27
US Hot Country Songs (Billboard)	36

== Certifications ==
Certifications for "Human"
Region	Certification	Certified units/sales
Canada (Music Canada)	Platinum	80,000^{‡}
United States (RIAA)	2× Platinum	2,000,000^{‡}
^{‡} Sales+streaming figures based on certification alone.
