= I'm Gonna Love You =

2024 single by Cody Johnson and Carrie Underwood

Single by Cody Johnson and Carrie Underwood

from the album Leather
- Released: September 27, 2024
- Genre: Country
- Length: 3:08
- Label: Warner Music Nashville
- Songwriters: Chris Stevens; Kelly Archer; Travis Denning
- Producer: Trent Willmon

Cody Johnson singles chronology
"Dirt Cheap" (2024)	"I'm Gonna Love You" (2024)	"The Fall" (2025)

Carrie Underwood singles chronology
"Leave a Light On (Talk Away the Dark)" (2023)	"I'm Gonna Love You" (2024)

Music video
- "I'm Gonna Love You" on YouTube

"I'm Gonna Love You" is a song by American country music singers Cody Johnson and Carrie Underwood. It was released on September 27, 2024, as the lead single from the deluxe edition of Johnson's ninth studio album, Leather (2023). The song was written by Chris Stevens, Kelly Archer and Travis Denning and produced by Trent Willmon.

== Background ==
Johnson announced the song via Instagram on September 17, 2024. In an Instagram story, he revealed the song was made in 2019 and originally had a female singer performing the harmony, but was not a duet. He decided to collaborate with Underwood on the song.

== Composition and lyrics ==
Over a piano-driven instrumental, the artists each describe inevitabilities of life before singing "And I'm gonna love you". They join their voices in the chorus, singing together: "So good that it almost hurts / Steady and true as a Bible verse / My heart skips just thinkin' of you / Go on and bet it all, baby, we can't lose". In addition, they express their unwavering support and love for each other when facing obstacles and challenges. An electric guitar solo is played toward the end of the track.

== Reception ==
Country Universe gave the song a grade of B, writing, "It’s a credit to Johnson that he continues to select excellent material from outside writers." The single reached the top ten of Billboard’s Country Airplay, also receiving a nomination from the Country Music Association Awards for Musical Event of the Year.

=== Commercial performance ===
On October 28, 2025, the song received a new Platinum certification from the RIAA.

== Accolades ==
Year	Association	Category	Result	Ref
2025	Canadian Country Music Association	Songwriter(s) of the Year	Won	

== Music video ==
The music video premiered alongside the single. It was directed by Dustin Haney and filmed in Wells, Nevada and Nashville, Tennessee. It sees Johnson and Underwood in a setting of "stunning landscapes and horses", before they come together. It received a nomination from the 59th CMA Awards for Music Video of the Year.

== Charts ==
=== Weekly charts ===
Weekly chart performance for "I'm Gonna Love You"
Chart (2024–25)	Peak position
Australia Digital Tracks (ARIA)	20
Canada Hot 100 (Billboard)	78
Canada Country (Billboard)	6
New Zealand Hot Singles (RMNZ)	24
US Billboard Hot 100	37
US Hot Country Songs (Billboard)	7
US Country Airplay (Billboard)	3

=== Year-end charts ===
Year-end chart performance for "I'm Gonna Love You"
Chart (2025)	Position
US Billboard Hot 100	78
US Hot Country Songs (Billboard)	24
US Country Airplay (Billboard)	36

== Certifications ==
Certifications for "I'm Gonna Love You"
Region	Certification	Certified units/sales
United States (RIAA)	Platinum	1,000,000^{‡}
^{‡} Sales+streaming figures based on certification alone.
