= Dirt Cheap =

2024 single by Cody Johnson

Single by Cody Johnson

from the album Leather
- Released: March 11, 2024
- Genre: Country
- Length: 3:59
- Label: Warner Nashville
- Songwriter: Josh Phillips
- Producer: Trent Willmon

Cody Johnson singles chronology
"Long Live Cowgirls" (2023)	"Dirt Cheap" (2024)	"I'm Gonna Love You" (2024)

Music video
- "Dirt Cheap" on YouTube

"Dirt Cheap" is a song by American country music singer Cody Johnson. It was released on March 11, 2024, as the second single from his third major-label studio album Leather. It was written by Josh Phillips and produced by Trent Willmon.

== Content ==
"Dirt Cheap" was written by Josh Phillips and originally intended to be cut by Luke Combs. Phillips' wife later suggested he send it to Johnson after Combs ultimately did not use it, and Phillips' prior connection with producer Trent Willmon helped to pass it along to Johnson.

The song describes a scenario in which representatives from a railroad company try to buy the land of an elderly cotton farmer to complete the right of way for a new subdivision, but the farmer refuses regardless of the company's offering price, due to the nostalgic value of his fields, citing his memories of raising his now-grown daughter, hunting with his pet dog who has since died, and his marriage.

== Music video ==
The music video for "Dirt Cheap" was directed by Dustin Haney and premiered on June 28, 2024.

== Charts ==
=== Weekly charts ===
Weekly chart performance
Chart (2024)	Peak position
Canada Hot 100 (Billboard)	86
Canada Country (Billboard)	7
US Billboard Hot 100	43
US Country Airplay (Billboard)	5
US Hot Country Songs (Billboard)	14

=== Year-end charts ===
Annual chart rankings
Chart (2024)	Position
US Country Airplay (Billboard)	19
US Hot Country Songs (Billboard)	17
US Radio Songs (Billboard)	61

== Certifications ==
Certifications for "Dirt Cheap"
Region	Certification	Certified units/sales
United States (RIAA)	2× Platinum	2,000,000^{‡}
^{‡} Sales+streaming figures based on certification alone.
