= Cody Johnson =

American country singer (born 1987)

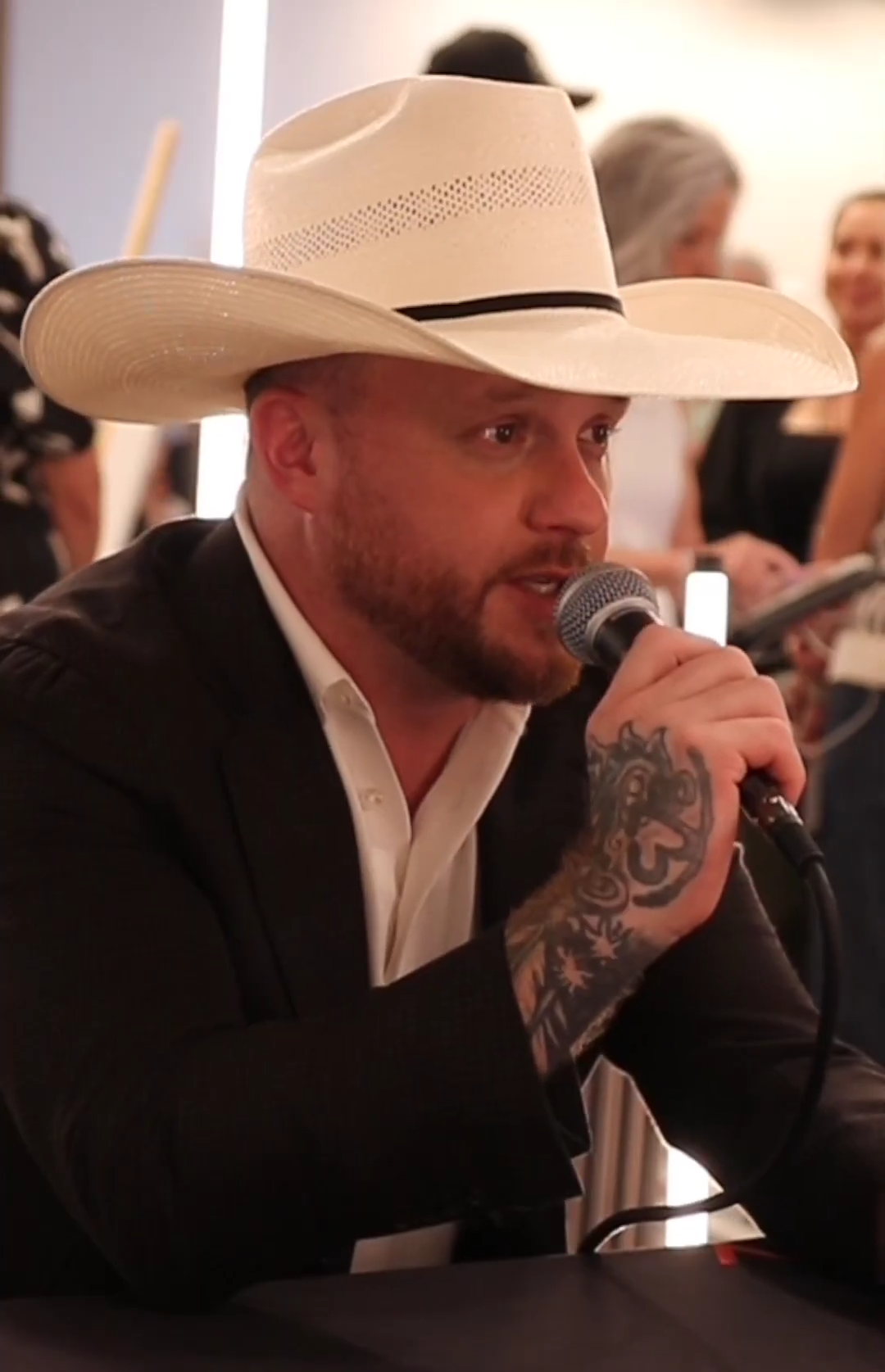
- Johnson during an interview in 2024

Background information
- Also known as: CoJo
- Born: Cody Daniel Johnson; May 21, 1987 (age 39); Huntsville, Texas, U.S.
- Origin: Trinity, Texas, U.S.
- Genre: Country
- Occupations: Singer; songwriter
- Years active: 2006–present
- Labels: CoJo; Warner Nashville
- Website: codyjohnsonmusic.com

Cody Daniel Johnson (born May 21, 1987) is an American country music singer. He has self-released six albums, including Gotta Be Me, which debuted at number two on Billboard's Country Albums chart, before releasing his first major-label album, Ain't Nothin' to It, in January 2019. He released his second major-label album, Human: The Double Album, in October 2021. His style is classified as contemporary country and neotraditional country, drawing influences from artists like George Strait and Willie Nelson. His song "'Til You Can't" won two awards at the Country Music Association Awards in 2022. His album Leather won the CMA Album of the Year on November 20, 2024. He toured Australia in 2023 and 2025, with many shows selling out.

== Early life ==
Cody Daniel Johnson, also known as "CoJo," was born and raised in Sebastopol, northeast of Huntsville, Texas, to Sheila and Carl Johnson. He began playing music at the age of 12 and learned to play from his father, who performed with their local church. He first taught Johnson the popular gospel song "I'll Fly Away."

Johnson learned to sing and play several instruments, such as guitar and drums, and studied how to read musical notation. He performed at schools, churches, and bars, where he discovered that people enjoyed his music. At the same time, he rode bulls professionally at local rodeos and worked alongside his father in the local prison system. At 19, the prison's warden convinced him to commit full time to his music career.

== Career ==
=== 2006–2014: Career beginnings ===
Johnson's agriculture science teacher heard him play an original song and encouraged him to start a band with other Future Farmers of America (FFA) members. In 2006, Johnson formed the Cody Johnson Band with his father, Carl, and drummer Nathan Reedy. Just a few months later, the newly formed band won second place in a major Texas state talent contest. Together they recorded and released an album, Black and White Label on January 6, 2006 through his own CoJo label that paid for travel and radio ads. In 2006, the band added Matt Rogers on lead guitar and recorded a live album, Live and Rocking in 2007, at Shenanigans and Confetti's Club in Huntsville. After the release of the album, Johnson's father quit the band.

By 2009, Danny Salinas joined the band on bass guitar. Their first professionally produced album, Six Strings One Dream, was released on September 1, 2009, and three singles from the album reached the top 10 of the Texas music charts, including "Texas Kind of Way." After the album's release, the band added Chris Whitten on fiddle and Jeff Smith on lead guitar. Jody Bartula replaced Whitten on fiddle in 2010. Johnson's third album, A Different Day, produced by Trent Willmon, was released on October 31, 2011. Johnson won the 2011 Texas Regional Music Award for New Male Vocalist of the Year. Then he left his day job with the Texas Department of Criminal Justice to focus on music full-time. He teamed with Kyle Park in 2012 for the Dancin' and Drinkin' at Johnson Park Tour. Also in 2012, Johnson's band, now composed of Reedy, Smith, Bartula, and bassist Joey Pruski changed their name to the Rockin' CJB.

=== 2014–2021: Breakthrough and major-label deal ===
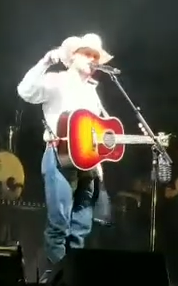
Johnson in 2018

Johnson's fifth album, Cowboy Like Me, was released on January 14, 2014. It was his second album to be produced by Trent Willmon. Selling 8,000 copies in its first week of release, it debuted at number 7 on the Billboard Top Country Albums chart and number 33 on the Billboard 200. The deep cut "Me and My Kind" later went viral on TikTok in 2020, becoming a concert staple and one of his most popular songs. Johnson was a featured artist on the docu-reality television show Troubadour, TX, boosting his TV exposure. As of 2014, Johnson's band comprised Smith, Bartula, Pruski, and drummer Miles Stone. His sixth album, Gotta Be Me, was released on August 5, 2016. The album debuted at No. 11 on the Billboard 200, and at No. 2 on the Top Country Albums chart, selling 23,000 copies in the US in its first week. It was Johnson's most successful release to date, achieved without major label support or widespread radio play. On April 21, 2017, Johnson made his Grand Ole Opry debut.

Johnson made Houston Livestock Show and Rodeo history in March 2018 by becoming the first unsigned/independent artist to play to a sold-out crowd. His seventh album, Ain't Nothin' to It, was released on January 18, 2019. It includes the single "On My Way to You", which was his first Top 20 hit on Country Airplay. The album and single were both released via Warner Records Nashville. In 2019, he collaborated with Brooks & Dunn on a new version of their hit song "Red Dirt Road", which appears on their album Reboot.

=== 2021–2025: Human: The Double Album and Leather ===
Johnson released his most popular hit to date, "'Til You Can't" in June 2021, debuting at number 42 on the Billboard Hot Country Songs chart dated June 26, 2021. Johnson's eighth album, Human: The Double Album, was released on October 8, 2021. After the album was released, it climbed to number 24 on the chart dated October 23, 2021. The song went on to become his first Country radio chart-topper, earned him his first Grammy Award for Best Country Song, peaked at No. 18 on the Billboard Hot 100, and was certified six-times Platinum. It was notably covered by Kid Rock during the All-American Halftime Show in 2026. "Human" was chosen as the follow-up single, sent to Country radio on June 6, 2022.

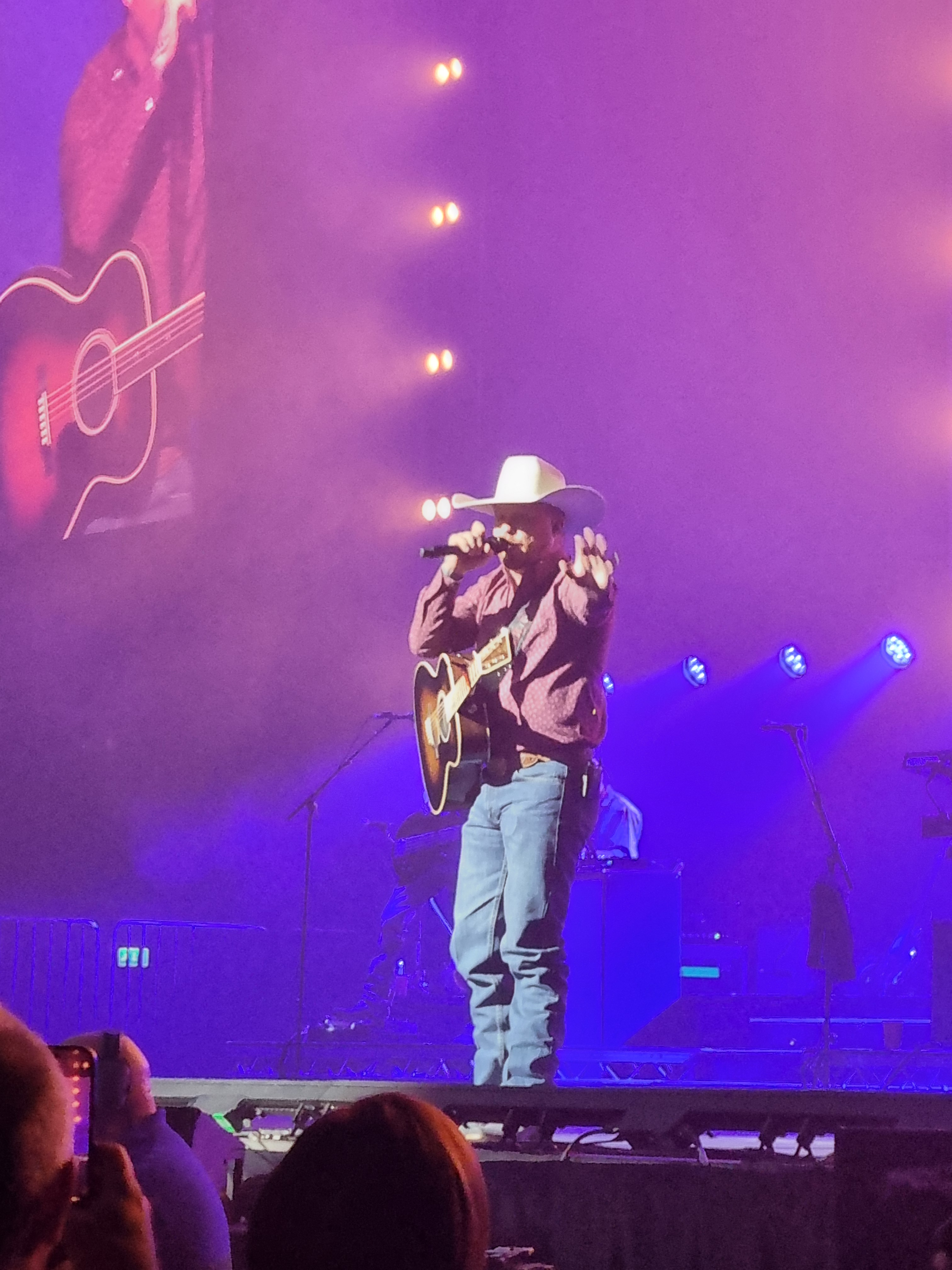
Johnson in 2025

Johnson announced "The Painter" in an interview with iHeartRadio's Spencer Graves in July 2023, which was set to be sent to country radio on August 14 as the lead single for his ninth album. It was a major success, becoming his second chart-topper, being certified triple Platinum, and peaked at No. 25 on the Billboard Hot 100. His ninth album Leather was released on November 3, 2023, containing three more successful radio hits "Dirt Cheap", a duet with Carrie Underwood "I'm Gonna Love You", and deluxe reissue track "The Fall". The album went Platinum, had a sold-out tour in promotion, won the CMA Album of the Year award, and released the Leather Deluxe Edition in November 2024, adding 12 new tracks. That year, he also collaborated with Terri Clark on a new version of her song "I Just Wanna Be Mad" for her album Take Two.

In 2025, he won ACM Song of the Year for "Dirt Cheap" and CMA Male Vocalist of the Year. On November 7, 2025, Johnson released his highly anticipated viral cover of The Chicks' ''Travelin' Soldier" in honor of the Veterans Day holiday. Upon its official release, the studio version debuted at No. 12 on the Billboard Hot 100, making it the highest-charting song of his career.

=== 2026–present: Banks of the Trinity ===
Johnson announced his tenth studio album, Banks of the Trinity, which was released on June 26, 2026. The lead single "I Want You" was released on April 17, 2026, followed by multiple promotional singles including the radio single "Horseback" and "Take Me Back (Leave Me There)". The latter went viral on TikTok through a cappella romantic trend.

== Artistry ==
=== Musical style ===
Cody Johnson's music is classified as contemporary country, neo-traditionalist country, or cowboy. Marcus Dowling of CMT said that many view Johnson as a leader within the "back to country" movement in the industry. In an interview with Brett Callwood of Westword, Johnson said that his music draws from multiple genres: "I'm not sure if you'd call me Texas or red dirt or mainstream or outlaw. I just always say that I'm me. I sound like what I sound like, and I'm not trying to be anything that I'm not."

=== Influences ===
Johnson is inspired by many artists who are considered to be traditional country music artists: George Strait, Willie Nelson, Merle Haggard, Hank Williams, and Loretta Lynn. In an interview with Andy Langer and Texas Monthly in 2019, he said that he is inspired by two artists in particular: "The George Strait type of traditional country music is what I like, and that's what I stand for. But at the same time, Willie Nelson's unwillingness to waver on who he is means just as much." Johnson takes inspiration from his country background of bull riding and working within the prison system, which he said has influenced his songs such as "Guilty as Can Be". In a Westword interview, Johnson spoke of the influence of previous job experiences: "It (Guilty as Can Be) was a made-up story about a guy who catches his wife cheating, goes to prison and the whole nine yards. I paid homage to my prison years there." Additionally, nearly being in a plane crash was the inspiration for "Til You Can't" and "Billy's Brother" is about barroom brawls he witnessed.

== Personal life ==
Johnson married his wife Brandi on November 8, 2008. They first met as teenagers at a Future Farmers of America event and crossed paths again years later at a local bar. They have three children: daughters Clara Mae (born 2015) and Cori (born 2017), and a son, Jaycee (born October 2025).

Johnson is a Christian.

== Discography ==
Studio albums

- Black and White Label (2006)
- Six Strings One Dream (2009)
- A Different Day (2011)
- Cowboy Like Me (2014)
- Gotta Be Me (2016)
- Ain't Nothin' to It (2019)
- Human: The Double Album (2021)
- Leather (2023)
- Banks of the Trinity (2026)

== Awards and nominations ==
=== American Music Awards ===
Year	Nominee / work	Award	Result
2022	Cody Johnson	Favorite Country Male Artist	Nominated
2022	Human: The Double Album	Favorite Country Album	Nominated
2022	"'Til You Can't"	Favorite Country Song	Nominated

=== People's Choice Country Awards ===
Year	Nominee / work	Award	Result
2024	Cody Johnson	Male Artist of 2024	Nominated
2024	Leather	Album of 2024	Nominated
2024	"Dirt Cheap"	Male Song of 2024	Nominated
2024	"Dirt Cheap"	Storyteller Song of 2024	Won

=== iHeartRadio Music Awards ===
Year	Nominee / work	Award	Result
2023	Cody Johnson	Best New Country Artist	Won

=== CMT Music Awards ===
Year	Nominee / work	Award	Result
2022	"'Til You Can't"	Male Video of the Year	Won
2022	"Dear Rodeo"	CMT Digital-First Performance of the Year	Won
2023	"Human"	Male Video of the Year	Nominated
2023	"'Til You Can't" (from 2022 CMT Music Awards)	CMT Performance of the Year	Won
2024	"The Painter"	Video of the Year	Nominated
2024	"The Painter"	Male Video of the Year	Nominated
2024	"Human" (from 2023 CMT Music Awards)	CMT Performance of the Year	Nominated

=== Academy of Country Music Awards ===
Year	Nominee / work	Award	Result
2020	Cody Johnson	New Male Artist of the Year	Nominated
2021	Cody Johnson	New Male Artist of the Year	Nominated
2023	"'Til You Can't"	Single of the Year	Nominated
2023	"'Til You Can't"	Song of the Year	Nominated
2023	"'Til You Can't"	Visual Media of the Year	Nominated
2024	Cody Johnson	Entertainer of the Year	Nominated
2024	Cody Johnson	Male Artist of the Year	Nominated
2024	Leather	Album of the Year	Nominated
2024	"The Painter"	Song of the Year	Nominated
2024	"Human"	Visual Media of the Year	Nominated
2025	"Dirt Cheap"	Visual Media of the Year	Nominated
2025	"Dirt Cheap"	Single of the Year	Nominated
2025	"Dirt Cheap"	Song of the Year	Won
2025	"I'm Gonna Love You" (Feat. Carrie Underwood)	Music Event of the Year	Nominated
2025	"I'm Gonna Love You" (Feat. Carrie Underwood)	Visual Media of the Year	Nominated
2025	Cody Johnson	Male Artist of the Year	Nominated
2025	Cody Johnson	Entertainer of the Year	Nominated
2026	Cody Johnson	Entertainer of the Year	Won
2026	Cody Johnson	Male Artist of the Year	Won
2026	"The Fall"	Single of the Year	Nominated
2026	"The Fall"	Visual Media of the Year	Nominated

=== Country Music Association Awards ===
Year	Nominee / work	Award	Result
2019	Cody Johnson	New Artist of the Year	Nominated
2022	Cody Johnson	New Artist of the Year	Nominated
2022	"'Til You Can't"	Single of the Year	Won
2022	"'Til You Can't"	Music Video of the Year	Won
2022	Cody Johnson	Male Vocalist of the Year	Nominated
2023	Cody Johnson	Male Vocalist of the Year	Nominated
2024	Cody Johnson	Male Vocalist of the Year	Nominated
2024	Leather	Album of the Year	Won
2024	"Dirt Cheap"	Single of the Year	Nominated
2024	"Dirt Cheap"	Music Video of the Year	Nominated
2024	"The Painter"	Music Video of the Year	Nominated
2025	I'm Gonna Love You" (Feat. Carrie Underwood)	Music Video of the Year	Nominated
2025	I'm Gonna Love You" (Feat. Carrie Underwood)	Musical Event of the Year	Nominated
2025	Cody Johnson	Male Vocalist of the Year	Won
2025	Cody Johnson	Entertainer of the Year	Nominated
2026	Cody Johnson	Entertainer of the Year	Pending
2026	Cody Johnson	Male Vocalist of the Year	Nominated
2026	"The Fall"	Single of the Year	Nominated
2026	"The Fall"	Video of the Year	Nominated

== Tours ==
=== Headlining ===
- The Leather Tour (2024)
- Leather Deluxe Tour (2025)
- Cody Johnson Live '26 (2026)

=== Supporting ===
- 2019 Tour (Justin Moore) (2019)
- Beer Never Broke My Heart Tour (Luke Combs) (2019)
- Wildcard Tour (Miranda Lambert) (2020)
- Middle of Somewhere (Luke Combs) (2022)
- Luke Combs World Tour (Luke Combs) (2023)
- Out in the Middle Tour (Zac Brown Band) (2022)
