= Lady Like (song) =

Single by Ingrid Andress

from the album Lady Like
- Released: October 5, 2020
- Studio: Rosebank Studio (Nashville)
- Genre: Country pop
- Length: 3:14
- Label: Atlantic; Warner Music Nashville
- Songwriters: Ingrid Andress; Sam Ellis; Derrick Southerland
- Producers: Ingrid Andress; Sam Ellis

Ingrid Andress singles chronology
| "The Stranger" (2020) | "Lady Like" (2020) | "Wishful Drinking" (2021) |

Music video
- "Lady Like" on YouTube

"Lady Like" is a song by American singer-songwriter Ingrid Andress from her debut studio album of the same name (2020). It was written by Andress, Sam Ellis and Derrick Southerland, with Andress and Ellis handling the production. The track was originally released as Andress' debut single under Warner Music Nashville for digital download and streaming on February 22, 2019, and was later re-released as the third single off her debut album in October 2020 by the aforementioned label. A country pop song, "Lady Like" is about resisting gender stereotypes. Andress wrote the song after going out with a man who rejected her when she started talking about politics. She also used her personal experiences of being expected to act like a woman as inspiration for the track.

"Lady Like" received widespread acclaim from music critics, who complimented Andress' lyricism as well as the song's feminist message, with some deeming it an "anthem". Commercially, the track reached the top forty on both Billboard's Country Airplay and Hot Country Songs charts. It was also certified gold by the Recording Industry Association of America (RIAA) and Music Canada (MC). Two music videos were filmed to promote the song, both depicting Andress refusing to engage in different tasks which women are expected to perform. The videos received praise for how they incorporated the song's lyrics into visual imagery. For further promotion, Andress performed the song on several occasions, including on The Ellen DeGeneres Show and at the 2021 CMT Music Awards.

== Background and release ==
Andress graduated from Berklee College of Music in 2013 and was advised by her professor, American songwriter Kara DioGuardi, to move to Nashville to pursue a songwriting career. She was signed to DioGuardi's music publishing company, Arthouse Entertainment, and began composing among other songwriters. Under Arthouse Entertainment, she released her debut single "The Stranger" in February 2017. Andress' contribution to Charli XCX's "Boys" (2017) and Fletcher's "About You" (2019) caught the attention of record label Warner Music Nashville, and in 2018 the label signed her as a recording artist.

Andress wrote "Lady Like" with Sam Ellis and Derrick Southerland, and produced it alongside Ellis. The song was recorded at Rosebank Studio. It was released as Andress's debut single under Warner Music Nashville on February 22, 2019 for digital download and streaming by the former label. Talking to Annie Reuter of Billboard, Andress revealed that she chose to release "Lady Like" as her first single over "More Hearts Than Mine" (2019) as she considered that it represented her the best. On October 5, 2020, the song was re-released as the third single off her debut album Lady Like, when it was sent to country radio stations by Warner Music Nashville. Furthermore, she recorded a "reimagined" version of the track for her short film A Lady Like That (2021) alongside an all-female orchestra.

== Composition and lyrics ==
Musically, "Lady Like" is a country pop song. Andress told CMT that she came up with the track after going out with a man who turned her down after she brought the topic of politics up. The track is about defying gender stereotypes. Andress further clarified that a past experience which inspired her to write the song was when she first experienced being expected to confirm to gender stereotypes, which was when she began attending public school after being home-schooled. Moreover, she added in an interview with Idolator that the song was also inspired by her moving to Nashville where she was frequently criticized for not acting feminine. The song "really came from that frustration" but simultaneously felt "liberating".

The track begins with the lyrics "I drink tequila straight / Haven't brushed my hair in days / And I'll kiss on the first date if I'm really feeling it / I don't even own a dress / Bite my nails when I get stressed / Do whatever for attention if I'm needing it", which have been described by Jael Goldfine of Paper as "unapologetic non-confessions". Taste of Country's Cillea Houghton claimed that the track sees Andress "fully embracing her IDGAF attitude and raising a metaphorical middle finger to the stereotypes that suppress women". Jof Owen from The Line of Best Fit expressed a similar opinion, stating that Andress is "[the] shit talking straight tequila drinking nail biting no-fucks-giving 'lady' who refuses to be 'ladylike' just to align with other people’s expectations of her".

== Reception and commercial performance ==
"Lady Like" received widespread acclaim from music critics. Goldfine praised Andress' lyricism and vocal delivery. She described the song as "a classic girl power anthem", likening it to other tracks with feminist themes such as No Doubt's "Just a Girl" and Lily Allen's "Hard out Here". Similarly, Billboard's Reuter called the song "[an] empowerment anthem". Interviewing Andress for CMT, Samantha Stephens also complimented the lyrics. Stephens stated that "Lady Like" will become "an undeniable anthem for women and folks everywhere, and a much-needed reminder that the only path to follow as a woman in the world is the one you’re walking". Bobby Moore, writing for The Boot, claimed that Andress "captures the lyrical candidness" of the track.

Owen compared the song to Victoria Beckham's of Spice Girls lyric "just do what you want, but make sure you do it like a lady" and deemed it a "fourth-wave feminist anthem". Robert Crawford of Rolling Stone included the track on the publication's list of 10 Best Country and Americana Songs of the Week. He regarded it as a "slow-burning anthem of independence" for women and their right "to be outspoken". Reviewing Andress' debut album, Houghton listed "Lady Like" as "the album's crowning jewel". Justin Cober-Lake from PopMatters declared that the chorus "never loses its distinctness" among other modern pop songs. Commercially, "Lady Like" peaked at number thirty-three on Billboard's Country Airplay chart and at number thirty-nine on the Hot Country Songs chart. The song received a gold certification by the Recording Industry Association of America (RIAA) on September 10, 2021. Although it did not enter the Canadian charts, the track was certified gold by Music Canada (MC).

== Promotion ==
=== Music videos ===
Two music videos were filmed for the song. The first one was uploaded to Andress' YouTube channel on March 8, 2019 and was directed by Emma Higgins. The video begins with Andress performing "ladylike" tasks, specifically balancing books on her head and doing laundry. She is then shown manspreading at a poker game with other men and for a moment she exchanges winks with a "punk" Mona Lisa. Afterwards, Andress is playing a piano and singing in a "mini jungle". The video was originally planned to be filmed in a desert, but due to weather conditions, it was instead filmed in a studio in Los Angeles. The second music video was released on March 10, 2021 on Andress' YouTube channel and was directed by Lauren Dunn. In the video, Andress is surrounded by greenery and carries out various activities which she considers to break stereotypes, including crushing eggshells while wearing boots and burning a bra. She is further accompanied by background dancers. In an interview with Nylon, Andress stated that the reason why she chose to put out a second video for the song was because "a lot has happened in the two years since [she] put 'Lady Like' out". She wanted her fans of being capable of seeing where she's "now as a human".

=== Reception ===
Both music videos received praise for their visuals. Stephens considered that the first music video "provides the perfect visual" for the song's lyrics, while Goldfine called the visual imagery "on the nose, but gratifying". Chris Parton of Sounds Like Nashville said that Andress "boldly rejected the old-school notion of womanhood" by choosing to publish the music video on International Women's Day. Parton added that she performed in the music video "all with [a] big dose of 'ladylike' poise". Regarding the second video, writing for ABC News Online, Houghton described Andress making way through gender stereotypes in "eclectic, yet subtle ways". Houghton found it to be "elegant".

=== Live performances ===
Andress performed "Lady Like" for the first time in April 2019 on the late-night talk show Late Night with Seth Meyers. In the same year she sang the track live at Vevo. On March 23, 2020, she performed the song at YouTube Space New York. The singer also sang "Lady Like" on several occasions in 2021, on The Ellen DeGeneres Show, the Late Show with Stephen Colbert, and at the 2021 CMT Music Awards. For her Feeling Things Tour (2021–2022), Andress included the song on the setlist for the November 18, 2021, show. As part of Keith Urban's The Speed of Now World Tour (2022), "Lady Like" was one of the songs Andress performed at Nationwide Arena on September 23.

== Credits and personnel ==
Credits adapted from the liner notes of Lady Like.

Recording and management

- Recorded at Rosebank Studio (Nashville, Tennessee)
- Mixed at Larrabee Studios (North Hollywood, California)
- Mastered at Georgetown Masters (Nashville, Tennessee)
- Published by Songs of Universal Inc. / What Is an Ingrid / Straight from the Art Music / Songs for a Stone Heart / Universal Music Corp. / Happy Rock Publishing (BMI)

Personnel

- Sam Ellis – songwriter, producer, acoustic guitar, banjo, piano, keyboards, programming
- Ingrid Andress – lead vocals, songwriting, producer
- Derrick Southerland – songwriter
- Manny Marroquin – mixing
- Chris Galland – mixing engineer
- Robin Florent – mixing engineer assistant
- Scott Desmarais – mixing engineer assistant
- Devin Malone – steel guitar, cello
- Andrew Mendelson – mastering

== Track listing ==
- Digital download
1. "Lady Like" – 3:14
- Digital download – Deepend Remix
1. "Lady Like – Deepend Remix" – 3:05
2. "Lady Like" – 3:14
3. "Lady Like – The Rosebank Acoustic Sessions" – 3:15
- American 7" vinyl
1. "Lady Like"
2. "Lady Like (Acoustic)"

== Charts ==
=== Weekly charts ===
Weekly chart performance for "Lady Like"
| Chart (2021) | Peak position |
|---|---|
| US Country Airplay (Billboard) | 33 |
| US Hot Country Songs (Billboard) | 39 |

=== Year-end charts ===
Year-end chart performance for "Lady Like"
| Chart (2021) | Position |
|---|---|
| US Hot Country Songs (Billboard) | 100 |

== Certifications ==
Certifications for "Lady Like"
| Region | Certification | Certified units/sales |
|---|---|---|
| Canada (Music Canada) | Gold | 40,000^{‡} |
| United States (RIAA) | Gold | 500,000^{‡} |
^{‡} Sales+streaming figures based on certification alone.

== Release history ==
Release dates and formats for "Lady Like"
| Region | Date | Format | Label | Ref. |
|---|---|---|---|---|
| Various | February 22, 2019 | Digital download; streaming | Warner Music Nashville | |
| Various | October 11, 2019 | Digital EP | Warner Music Nashville | |
| United States | 2019 | 7" vinyl | Atlantic; Warner Music Nashville | |
| United States | October 5, 2020 | Country radio | Warner Music Nashville | |
