= Lady Like =

- Standard edition cover artwork (Note: The deluxe edition cover artwork has a pink peony in the bottom corner left and the background has a sunset look.)

Studio album by Ingrid Andress
- Released: March 27, 2020
- Studios: Blackbird Studios (Nashville); Evan's Place (Nashville); Rosebank Studio (Nashville); The Chambers (Nashville); The Planetarium (Nashville); The Tracking Room (Nashville)
- Genre: Country pop
- Length: 26:29
- Label: Warner Music Nashville
- Producers: Zach Abend; Ingrid Andress; Sam Ellis; AJ Pruis; Jordan Schmidt

Ingrid Andress chronology
Lady Like (2020)	Good Person (2022)

Singles from Lady Like
- 1. "More Hearts Than Mine" Released: June 12, 2019; 2. "The Stranger" Released: June 1, 2020; 3. "Lady Like" Released: October 5, 2020

Lady Like is the debut studio album by American singer-songwriter Ingrid Andress. It was released on March 27, 2020, by Warner Music Nashville. A country pop record, its tracks are inspired by Andress's real-life events. The album focuses on the themes of relationships, family and feminism. Andress co-wrote and co-produced the entirety of it, while working with other producers such as Sam Ellis and Jordan Schmidt. "More Hearts Than Mine" preceded the album, being released in April 2019 as its lead single. It charted on the Billboard Hot 100 and the Canadian Hot 100. The track obtained double platinum certifications from the Recording Industry Association of America (RIAA) and Music Canada (MC).

The album received positive reviews from music critics, who praised its mix of country and pop as well as Andress's lyricism. It attained peak positions of four and nine on the country-music charts in the United Kingdom and the United States. On official charts, it peaked at numbers 47 in Scotland, 90 on the Billboard 200 and 91 in Canada. At the 63rd Annual Grammy Awards in 2021, the record was nominated for Best Country Album while the lead single scored a nomination for Best Country Song. Two more singles followed the album–"The Stranger" and "Lady Like"–which charted moderately on Billboard's Hot Country Songs and Country Airplay charts; the latter song was certified gold by the RIAA and MC. A deluxe edition of the album was issued in October 2020, having five more tracks and a different track listing which was arranged accordingly by Andress.

== Background and release ==
Prior to starting a music career, Andress appeared on the second and third seasons of The Sing-Off as part of a cappella groups Pitch Slapped and Delilah, respectively while being enrolled at Berklee College of Music. After graduating from the college in 2013, Andress was advised by her professor, American songwriter Kara DioGuardi, to move to Nashville to pursue a career in songwriting. One year later, Andress, alongside fellow singer Devin Dawson, worked with American record producer Frank Rogers during a writing session.

Two songs which Andress wrote resulted in her being signed to DioGuardi's music publishing company Arthouse Entertainment, where Andress would eventually begin composing among other songwriters. In December 2016, she independently released the promotional single "Deck the Halls (Holidays Are Here)" alongside musician Eric Arjes. The company released "The Stranger" as Andress's debut single on February 4, 2017. She released "Anything but Love" in October of the same year. In 2018, her songs "Demons Too" and "Paper Thin" were featured on CMT's reality television show Music City. Warner Music Nashville signed Andress as a recording artist in the same year after noticing her contribution to Charli XCX's "Boys" (2017) and Fletcher's "About You" (2018). "Lady Like" would be released as Andress's debut single by the aforementioned label in February 2019. In a March 2019 interview with The Boot, the singer stated that she was going to put out a new song "every couple of months" and that five songs will be released in total and grouped as an extended play "at the top of [2020]". On September 16, Warner Music Nashville issued Andress' debut extended play, The Rosebank Acoustic Sessions which contains acoustic covers of three of her songs. "Both", "We're Not Friends" and "Life of the Party", which were released as promotional singles throughout 2019 and 2020, would all later be included on the album. The Tennessean reported in December 2019 that Andress' debut album would be released in March 2020. She unveiled the album's track listing on March 4, 2020.

Lady Like was released on March 27, 2020, for digital download and streaming. The deluxe edition of the album was released on October 2. It contains two different versions of her songs "More Hearts Than Mine" and "The Stranger", a cover of Charli XCX's "Boys" as well as two new songs, "Feeling Things" and "Waste of Lime", while the entire tracklist was re-arranged. Andress re-arranged the tracklist in order from the earliest song she wrote to the most recent one, stating that she did it "to match that progression of that time of [her] life".

== Music and lyrics ==
Lady Like is a country pop record. The album's lyrics focus on Andress's personal experiences. Overall, they touch on themes of relationships, family and according to Jacob Uitti from American Songwriter, Andress's "signature scuffed-boot-brand of feminism". In a 2021 interview with Spin, she declared that her biggest inspirations for the album were the Chicks, Whitney Houston, John Denver and Adele. One day before the album's release, Andress talked to Billboard and revealed how each song on the record came to fruition. Andress co-wrote and co-produced the entire album. She also worked with producers, Zach Abend, AJ Pruis, Jordan Schmidt and Sam Ellis, having co-produced with the latter six tracks on the standard edition of the album. The tracks were recorded at various studios in Nashville.

The album's opener, "Bad Advice", is about drinking alcohol and kissing strangers in order to get over a break-up. It is a retro cha-cha-inspired track, while Hits's Holly Gleason considered it to be "string-bathed Julie London-style '60s Britpop-goes-mariachi". "Both", which discusses a lover's indecisiveness, was inspired by the frustration of Andress's friends with the online dating application Bumble. "We're Not Friends" discusses the mix of a friendship with courtship over banjo and cello sounds. Andress revealed that she wrote the former song with the intention of pitching it to other artists, before choosing to record it herself. "The Stranger" encompasses a piano sound and details a lost romance; Andress wrote it after noticing her generation's unrealistic expectations of love. "Anything but Love" is a guitar-driven ballad about heartbreak which contains a strong back beat. Also a ballad, "More Hearts Than Mine" relates how Andress's family will react if she brings her new boyfriend home. The song was inspired by Andress's real-life indecision of whether or not she should bring her new boyfriend to her family, as they became attached to an ex-boyfriend from a previous relationship of hers. "Life of the Party" showcases Andress being a party animal amidst a break-up. The title track is about defying gender stereotypes; Andress used her personal experiences of being expected to act like a woman as inspiration for the track.

== Critical reception ==
Professional ratings
Review scores
Source	Rating
AllMusic	4/5 stars
Exclaim!	7/10

Lady Like received positive reviews from music critics. AllMusic's Stephen Thomas Erlewine praised the mix of country and pop and deemed it "bright, glossy, and amorphous". He further added that it is "dense and accessible" throughout its eight tracks, which he considered "something of an achievement" for a debut album. Marlo Ashley of Exclaim! declared that the album "sonically diverges from the country-pop norm; Andress's lyrical honesty adds a sentimental perspective that invites you to listen to something out of the ordinary and makes you crave more." Justin Cober-Lake from Pop Matters gave the album a 7 out of 10 rating, writing that the album succeeds thanks to "a combination of songwriting craft and distinctive sound", and clarifying that Andress's "clear lyrical voice" contributes to its distinctness. Cillea Houghton, writing for Taste of Country, stated that Andress is "intelligent in her writing, clever with her words and has a brazen personality to match," and that she "brings a refreshing voice to country music." Curtis M. Wong of HuffPost called it "remarkably cohesive".

Mesfin Fekadu of the Associated Press considered the album to be "filled with lyrical gems" and added that it is one of 2020's strongest albums." Paper's Abby Schreiber declared that the record is filled with songs that "simultaneously cut you to the quick" but make one feeling "somehow stronger and more empowered." Writing for Variety, Chris Willman stated that Lady Like represents a return to a period when "strong female singer/songwriters who weren't necessarily strictly defined by genre" found their place in it such as Mary Chapin Carpenter and Rosanne Cash, and that Andress's pop crossover potential is "tremendous". Rolling Stone placed the album 24th on their 2020 year-end list of Best Country and Americana Albums with Jon Freeman commending the blending of country and pop and calling the album "charming and polished". At the 63rd Annual Grammy Awards, Lady Like received a nomination for Best Country Album while "More Hearts Than Mine" was nominated for Best Country Song.

== Singles and commercial performance ==
"More Hearts Than Mine" was released in April 2019 for digital download and streaming. It was later sent for radio airplay and impacted country radio stations on June 12 and July 8, respectively. The song was acclaimed by critics, who praised its lyrics and Andress's decision to write the song regarding the situation she was in. The track was Andress's first entry to chart on the Billboard Hot 100, reaching number 30. It also peaked at number 55 on the Canadian Hot 100. The single received double platinum certifications from the Recording Industry Association of America (RIAA) and Music Canada (MC). "The Stranger" was re-released as the second single from Lady Like when it was sent to country radio stations on June 1, 2020, peaking at numbers 49 and 54 on Billboard's Hot Country Songs and Country Airplay charts, respectively. It received positive reviews from critics, who praised its theme. "Lady Like" was serviced to country radio stations in October 2020, serving as the third and last single from the record. The track garnered acclaim from critics who complimented its feminist message, while some deemed it an "anthem". It reached the top 40 on both the aforementioned charts and attained gold certifications from the RIAA and MC.

Lady Like debuted and peaked at number nine on Billboard's Top Country Albums chart with 9,000 album-equivalent units. The record reached its highest peak on the UK Country Albums chart where it reached number four. It additionally peaked at numbers 47 in Scotland, 90 in Canada and 91 on the Billboard 200.

== Track listing ==
Credits adapted from the liner notes of Lady Like and AllMusic.

Lady Like standard edition
No.	Title	Writer(s)	Producer(s)	Length
1.	"Bad Advice"	Ingrid Andress; Jamie Moore; Derrick Southerland	Andress; Sam Ellis	3:27
2.	"Both"	Andress; Jordan Schmidt; Southerland	Andress; Schmidt	3:23
3.	"We're Not Friends"	Andress; Nate Cyphert; AJ Pruis; Southerland	Andress; Pruis	3:12
4.	"The Stranger"	Andress; Ryan Lafferty	Andress; Ellis	3:11
5.	"Anything but Love"	Zach Abend; Andress; Jamie Floyd	Abend; Andress; Ellis	3:32
6.	"More Hearts Than Mine"	Andress; Ellis; Southerland	Andress; Ellis	3:34
7.	"Life of the Party"	Andress; Jesse Thomas; Jason Wu	Andress; Ellis	2:56
8.	"Lady Like"	Andress; Ellis; Southerland	Andress; Ellis	3:16
Total length:				26:29

Deluxe edition
No.	Title	Writer(s)	Producer(s)	Length
1.	"Feeling Things"	Andress; Trey Campbell; Wu	Andress; Ellis	3:10
2.	"The Stranger" (Reimagined)	Andress; Lafferty		3:21
3.	"Anything but Love"	Abend; Andress; Floyd		3:32
4.	"We're Not Friends"	Andress; Cyphert; Pruis; Southerland		3:12
5.	"Both"	Andress; Schmidt; Southerland		3:23
6.	"More Hearts Than Mine"	Andress; Ellis; Southerland		3:34
7.	"Lady Like"	Andress; Southerland; Ellis		3:16
8.	"Boys"	Andress; Cass Lowe; Jerker Hansson; Ari Leff; Emily Warren; Michael Pollack	Hansson; Lowe	2:43
9.	"Bad Advice"	Andress; Southerland; Moore		3:27
10.	"Waste of Lime"	Andress; Ellis; Michael Edward Love; Shane McAnally; Scott McKenzie; Terry Melcher; John Phillips; Southerland	Andress; Ellis	3:08
11.	"Life of the Party"	Andress; Wu; Thomas		2:56
12.	"The Stranger"	Andress; Lafferty		3:12
13.	"More Hearts Than Mine" (with Karen Fairchild and Kimberly Schlapman of Little Big Town)	Andress; Ellis; Southerland		3:56
Total length:				42:56

Sample credits

- "Waste of Lime" contains an interpolation of "Kokomo" (1988) performed by The Beach Boys.
- "Boys" is a cover of the 2017 song of the same name by Charli XCX, with a mandolin replacing the video game sample noise.

== Credits and personnel ==
Credits adapted from the standard edition liner notes of Lady Like.

Locations

- Anthem House; Nashville, Tennessee (mixing: track 2)
- Blackbird Studios; Nashville, Tennessee (recording: track 2)
- Evan's Place; Nashville, Tennessee (recording: track 3)
- Georgetown Masters; Nashville, Tennessee (mastering: all tracks)
- Larrabee Studios; North Hollywood, California (mixing: tracks 6, 8)
- Rosebank Studio; Nashville, Tennessee (recording: tracks 1, 4–8)
- Sonic Element Studio; Los Angeles, California (mixing: tracks 1, 3, 4–8)
- The Chambers; Nashville, Tennessee (recording: track 3)
- The Library Studio; (strings recording: track 1)
- The Planetarium; Nashville, Tennessee (recording: track 4)
- The Tracking Room; Nashville, Tennessee (recording: track 2)

Musicians

- Sam Ellis – bass (tracks 4–6), acoustic guitar (tracks 1, 4, 6, 8), electric guitar (tracks 4, 6, 7), resonator guitar (track 6), banjo (tracks 7, 8), piano (tracks 1, 5–8), keyboards (tracks 1, 4–8), B3 (track 4), background vocals (tracks 4, 6)
- Ingrid Andress – lead vocals (all tracks), piano (track 4), background vocals (tracks 1–5, 7)
- Jordan Schmidt – acoustic guitar, electric guitar (track 2)
- AJ Pruis – bass, acoustic guitar, electric guitar, keyboards, background vocals (track 3)
- Zach Abend – keyboards (track 5)
- Miles McPherson – drums, percussion (track 2)
- Evan Hutchings – drums (track 3)
- Jared Kneale – drums (track 4)
- Tony Lucido – bass (track 2)
- Jamie Moore – acoustic guitar (track 1)
- Todd Lombardo – acoustic guitar, banjo (track 2)
- Tim Galloway – acoustic guitar, electric guitar, resonator guitar, banjo, mandolin (track 3)
- Devin Malone – acoustic guitar (track 5), electric guitar (track 1), baritone guitar (tracks 1, 6), steel guitar (tracks 1, 6–8), cello (tracks 7, 8)
- Carl Miner – acoustic guitar, mandolin (track 5)
- Tyler Chiarelli – electric guitar (track 2)
- Justin Schipper – steel guitar (track 4), pedal steel guitar (tracks 3, 5)
- Carole Rabinowitz – cello (track 1)
- Cremaine Bocker – cello (track 3)
- Dave Davidson – violin, string arrangement (track 1)
- David Angell – violin (track 1)
- Monisa Angell – viola (track 1)
- Alex Wright – piano, B3, synthesizer (track 2)

Technical

- Sam Ellis – production (tracks 1–6, 8), additional engineering (tracks 1, 4–6, 7), programming (tracks 1, 4–8), digital editing (tracks 1, 4, 5, 7)
- Ingrid Andress – production (all tracks)
- Thomas Dulin – additional engineering (track 4)
- Tylor Pollert – strings recording (track 1)
- Erik Madrid – mixing (tracks 1, 3, 4–8)
- Aaron Mattes – mixing assistant (tracks 1, 3–5, 7)
- Manny Marroquin – mixing (tracks 6, 8)
- Chris Galland – mixing engineer (tracks 6, 8)
- Robin Florent – mixing engineer assistant (tracks 6, 8)
- Scott Desmarais – mixing engineer assistant (tracks 6, 8)
- Court Blankenship – production assistant (tracks 1, 4, 5, 7)
- Jordan Schmidt – production, recording (track 2)
- Bryce Roberts – recording assistant (track 2), programming (track 2)
- Jeff Braun – mixing (track 2)
- Alyson McAnally – production coordinator (track 2)
- AJ Pruis – production, engineer, programming (track 3)
- Zach Abend – production, additional engineering, programming, digital editing (track 5)
- Andrew Mendelson – mastering (all tracks)

Creative and visual

- Mike Moore – art direction & design
- Jess Williams – photography
- Sonia Young – wardrobe
- Lindsay Doyle – hair/makeup

== Charts ==
=== Weekly charts ===
Chart performance for Lady Like
Chart (2020)	Peak position
Australian Country Albums (ARIA)	35
Canadian Albums (Billboard)	91
Scottish Albums (Official Charts)	47
UK Country Albums (Official Charts)	4
US Billboard 200	90
US Top Country Albums (Billboard)	9

=== Year-end charts ===
Year-end chart performance for Lady Like
Chart (2020)	Position
US Top Country Albums (Billboard)	73

== Release history ==
Release dates and formats for Lady Like
Region	Date	Label	Format(s)	Edition	Ref.
Various	March 27, 2020	Warner Music Nashville	Digital download; streaming	Standard	
Various	October 2, 2020	Warner Music Nashville	Digital download; streaming	Deluxe	
France	March 27, 2020	Warner	CD	Standard	
France	October 16, 2020	Warner	Vinyl	Standard	
Poland	March 27, 2020	Warner	CD	Standard	
Netherlands	August 13, 2020	Warner Music Nashville	CD	Standard	
United Kingdom	2020	PLG UK Frontline	CD	Standard	
