= The Stranger (Ingrid Andress song) =

- 2020 cover artwork

Single by Ingrid Andress

from the album Lady Like
- Released: June 1, 2020
- Studio: Rosebank Studio (Nashville); The Planetarium (Nashville)
- Genre: Country
- Length: 3:07 (2017 version); 3:12 (2020 version)
- Label: Arthouse; Warner Music Nashville; What Is an Ingrid
- Songwriters: Ingrid Andress; Ryan Lafferty
- Producers: Ingrid Andress; Sam Ellis

Ingrid Andress singles chronology
"More Hearts Than Mine" (2019)	"The Stranger" (2020)	"Lady Like" (2020)

Alternative cover
- 2017 cover artwork

Music video
- "The Stranger" on YouTube

"The Stranger" is a song by American singer-songwriter Ingrid Andress from her debut studio album, Lady Like (2020). The song was written by Andress alongside Ryan Lafferty, while the production was handled by the former and Sam Ellis. It was released as Andress' second single by Arthouse Entertainment and What Is an Ingrid on February 4, 2017, for digital download and streaming. After Andress signed a record deal with Warner Music Nashville, the label re-released the song as the second single from the album in June 2020. The country track details a lost romance and Andress was inspired to write it after noticing the unrealistic expectations of love.

"The Stranger" received positive reviews from music critics, who praised the song's theme, as well as Andress' vocal delivery. Commercially, it reached number 49 on Billboard's Hot Country Songs chart and number 54 on the Country Airplay chart. Two music videos were filmed for the song. The first was released in February 2017, via CMT and was directed by Lauren Jenkins. The second, directed by Emma Higgins, was released on the same day as Lady Like. It depicts various couples gazing in each other's eyes.

== Background and composition ==
Upon enrolling at Berklee College of Music, Andress joined the a cappella group Pitch Slapped. The group took part on the second season of American television singing competition The Sing-Off, finishing in last place. Andress returned to the competition for the next season as part of a different a cappella group, finishing sixth. After she graduated, American songwriter Kara DioGuardi, who was Andress' professor at the college, signed Andress to her music publishing company Arthouse Entertainment. In 2018, Warner Music Nashville signed Andress as a recording artist.

Musically, "The Stranger" is a country song. Andress wrote it with Ryan Lafferty and handled the production with Sam Ellis. "The Stranger" was recorded at Rosebank Studio and The Planetarium, and mixed at Sonic Element Studio. The 2017 version of the track lasts for three minutes and seven seconds, while the 2020 version lasts for five more seconds. The song discusses a fractured relationship. In an interview with Teen Vogue, Andress stated that she "wanted to weave in how unrealistic our generation's idea of romance tends to be", elaborating: "Most songs either talk about being super in love or not in love anymore, and there's never an in-between." Olivia Ladd of The Boot affirmed that "The Stranger" is "about the idea of love that her generation picked up from romanticized movies" and "[they] portray relationships as easy, but the song's lyrics look at it as a choice that requires hard work". CMT's Samantha Stephens described the song as a "haunting, piano-driven expose". Writing for The New York Times, Jon Caramanica claimed that Andress sings "full of resignation, to a lover who's grown distant" the line "You play the stranger, I'll play the girl at the bar".

== Release and reception ==
"The Stranger" was released as Andress' second single by the company and What Is an Ingrid for digital download and streaming on February 4, 2017. Warner Music Nashville issued a press release in May 2020, announcing that the song will be sent to American country radio stations on June 1 as a new single from Lady Like (2020). A reimagined version of the track was also released in August 2020 by Warner Music Nashville and was later included on the deluxe edition of her debut album, which was released on October 2, 2020.

"The Stranger" was met with positive reviews from music critics. Caramanica deemed it "an elegant evocation of corrosive loneliness" and praised Andress' vocals. Teen Vogue's Gabe Bergado also complimented Andress' vocal delivery, stating that the song "shows off [Andress'] beautiful vocals backed by an elegant piano melody". Billy Dukes of Taste of Country declared that "heavy chords add importance to the mellifluous presentation" of the track and it "gives major Brandi Carlile vibes by the end". Melinda Newman from Billboard considered "The Stranger" to be an "ethereal track". The staff of ABC News Radio called it an "emotional power ballad". Jeremy Chua, writing for Sounds Like Nashville, deemed it a "stellar ballad". Commercially, the song peaked at numbers 49 and 54 on Billboard's Hot Country Songs and Country Airplay charts, respectively.

== Promotion ==
The first music video for the song was released on February 22, 2017, via CMT. It was directed by Lauren Jenkins. The second video was directed by Emma Higgins and released on March 27, 2020, coinciding with Lady Like's release. In the latter visual, different couples are shown looking each other in the eyes. It was filmed in a house in Beverly Hills, California. Andress revealed to CMT that when she entered the house she was scared by a parrot, wishing in retrospect she would have included it in the video "somehow". Bergado noticed the inclusion of same-sex couples, to which Andress responded by saying that she "feel[s] extremely lucky to have this kind of platform to help spread love and awareness" and was hoping "videos like [hers]" would "help" country music "move forward". CMT's staff called the second visual "stunning". Andress sang the track at WDSY-FM on June 18, 2019. In 2020, she performed it during Country Radio Seminar's New Faces of Country Music event in February and at YouTube Space New York in May, respectively.

== Track listing ==
- Digital download
1. "The Stranger" – 3:07
- Digital download (Reimagined version)
1. "The Stranger (Reimagined)" – 3:23

== Credits and personnel ==
Credits adapted from the liner notes of Lady Like.

Recording and management

- Recorded at Rosebank Studio (Nashville, Tennessee) and The Planetarium (Nashville, Tennessee)
- Mixed at Sonic Element Studio (Los Angeles, California)
- Mastered at Georgetown Masters (Nashville, Tennessee)
- Published by Songs of Universal Inc. / What Is an Ingrid / Straight from the Art Music (BMI); BMG Platinum Songs US / SWMBMGBMI (BMI)

Personnel

- Sam Ellis – songwriter, producer, additional engineering, bass, acoustic guitar, electric guitar, keyboards, B3, programming, digital editing, background vocals
- Ingrid Andress – lead vocals, songwriter, producer, piano, background vocals
- Ryan Lafferty – songwriter
- Thomas Dulin – additional engineering
- Erik Madrid – mixing
- Aaron Matters – mixing assistant
- Court Blankenship – production assistant
- Jared Kneale – drums
- Justin Schipper – steel guitar
- Andrew Mendelson – mastering

== Charts ==
Chart performance for "The Stranger"
Chart (2020)	Peak position
US Country Airplay (Billboard)	54
US Hot Country Songs (Billboard)	49

== Release history ==
Release dates and formats for "The Stranger"
Region	Date	Format(s)	Version	Label(s)	Ref.
Various	February 4, 2017	Digital download; streaming	Original	Arthouse Entertainment; What Is an Ingrid	
United States	June 1, 2020	Country radio	Original	Warner Music Nashville	
Various	August 10, 2020	Digital download; streaming	Reimagined	Warner Music Nashville	
