= More Hearts Than Mine =

Single by Ingrid Andress

from the album Lady Like
- Written: 2018
- Released: June 12, 2019
- Studio: Rosebank Studio (Nashville)
- Genre: Country
- Length: 3:34
- Label: Warner Music Nashville
- Songwriters: Ingrid Andress; Sam Ellis; Derrick Southerland
- Producers: Ingrid Andress; Sam Ellis

Ingrid Andress singles chronology
"More Hearts Than Mine" (2019)	"The Stranger" (2020)

Music video
- "More Hearts Than Mine" on YouTube

"More Hearts Than Mine" is a song by American singer-songwriter Ingrid Andress from her debut studio album, Lady Like (2020). It was written by Andress alongside Sam Ellis and Derrick Southerland, with production being handled by Andress and Ellis. Warner Music Nashville released it as her debut single for digital download and streaming on April 5, 2019. In June 2019, the aforementioned label sent the song for radio airplay, becoming Andress' first song to be submitted for this format. The country ballad discusses Andress' decision of bringing her boyfriend home and declares that if they break up, her family will suffer most. Andress wrote the song after considering whether or not she should bring her new boyfriend to her family, as they became attached to Andress' ex-boyfriend from a previous relationship.

"More Hearts Than Mine" received widespread acclaim from music critics, who praised its lyrics and Andress' decision to write a song about the situation she was in. Commercially, the song peaked at number 30 on the Billboard Hot 100 and at number 55 on the Canadian Hot 100. The track attained double platinum certifications from the Recording Industry Association of America (RIAA) and Music Canada (MC). "More Hearts Than Mine" received nominations for Best Country Song at the 63rd Annual Grammy Awards and Song of the Year at the 54th Annual Country Music Association Awards.

A music video for the song was released via Billboard on April 24, 2019. It was directed by Sam Siske and it depicts a woman contemplating on how the people close to her would react if she brought her boyfriend with her. The video received a nomination for Breakthrough Video of the Year at the 2020 CMT Music Awards. To further promote the song, Andress performed it on various occasions, including at Grand Ole Opry in 2019 and on Jimmy Kimmel Live! in 2020.

== Background and release ==
Talking to Annie Reuter of Billboard in April 2019, Andress revealed that she chose to release "Lady Like" (2019) as her first single under Warner Music Nashville over "More Hearts Than Mine" as she considered that the former represented her the best. She wrote "More Hearts Than Mine" with Sam Ellis and Derrick Southerland, with whom she also collaborated on "Lady Like", and produced it alongside Ellis. It was recorded at Rosebank Studio and mixed at Larrabee Studios. In another interview with Billboard, Andress revealed that she wrote the song in late 2018.

Andress disclosed that the inspiration for the song came from when she pondered over bringing her new boyfriend to her family, and that the song's title resulted from that decision. She explained that her family became attached to an ex-boyfriend of hers from college and did not want to see her family disappointed if her new relationship would not work out either. In an interview with Billboard, Andress revealed that she was not "entirely convinced" she wanted to write a song about the situation.

It was released for digital download and streaming by Warner Music Nashville on April 5, 2019. The aforementioned label sent the track for radio airplay on June 12, becoming Andress' first single to be submitted for radio. In January 2020, the song was confirmed to be the first single off her debut album. Another version of the track, with Karen Fairchild and Kimberly Schlapman of Little Big Town was later included on the deluxe edition of Lady Like (2020).

== Composition ==
Musically, "More Hearts Than Mine" is a country ballad. In the song's chorus, Andress predicts how people close to her would react to her new relationship; her mother would fall in love with him instantly, her father would bond with him over "guy things" and pretend he doesn't like him, her sister would try to embarrass him by asking him "a million questions" and her high school friends would tell him about her "crazy nights". According to Jon Caramanica of The New York Times, the track is about "a love that lets you down that sounds like a tragedy even at the beginning, when there’s still hope". Carena Liptak of The Boot described "More Hearts Than Mine" as "a ballad about opening up to heartbreak by inviting a partner to meet your family in your hometown".

== Reception and commercial performance ==
"More Hearts Than Mine" received widespread acclaim from music critics. Caramanica claimed that the song was "elegantly written". Chris Willman, writing for Variety, complimented Andress' decision to write the song, stating "no one has thought to write a hit song" about "the worry about how a breakup might affect family members who’ve fallen for a significant other as much as oneself". Taste of Country's Billy Dukes stated about Andress that "there's something small-town relatable about her fears and observations" which "transcend the song". He affirmed that Andress "just dropped one of the best songs of 2019". Laura Whitmore of Parade called the track "a touching and beautifully crafted gem". People's Nancy Kruh praised the song's lyrics, declaring that Andress "has also done the near-impossible, identifying a common human situation previously unexamined in country lyrics". Writing for HuffPost, Curtis Wong claimed that Andress is "at her most lyrically adventurous" on the song. Tom Roland of Billboard compared it to Bobbie Gentry's "Ode to Billy Joe" (1967) and declared that it is "setting [Andress] up as a smart musical documentarian".

Commercially, "More Hearts Than Mine" peaked at number 30 on the Billboard Hot 100 and number 55 on the Canadian Hot 100. It further reached the top five of both territories' country-specific charts. The song was certified double platinum by the Recording Industry Association of America (RIAA) and Music Canada (MC).

== Promotion ==
The music video for the track premiered on April 24, 2019 via Billboard. It was directed by Sam Siske. The video begins with a woman arriving at her family's home in a car. Throughout the video, she is seen imagining how scenarios of being with her family at home or with her girl friends would be if she brought her lover. Interspersed shots of Andress playing a piano in the middle of a street and wandering through a corridor are shown during the video. It ends with the woman leaving her family's house. CMT named it the fifth best country music video of 2020.

After hearing Andress singing "Lady Like" at a country showcase in 2018, Karen Fairchild of Little Big Town invited her in July 2019 to perform "More Hearts Than Mine" and two other songs with fellow member Kimberly Schlapman as part of Cracker Barrel's "Five Decades, One Voice" initiative. In the same month Andress performed the song on American news and talk morning television show Today. On September 16, 2019 she sang "More Hearts Than Mine" live at Vevo. In October of the same year, Andress sang the track alongside "Lady Like" at the country music stage concert Grand Ole Opry. On March 19, 2020, the singer performed "More Hearts Than Mine" at YouTube Space New York. While performing the song at the 2020 CMT Music Awards, Andress broke down in tears. Her performance at the ceremony was lauded by Entertainment Tonight's Jennifer Drysdale and Carl Lamarre of Billboard. On December 9, 2020 Andress sang the track at the late-night talk show Jimmy Kimmel Live!. She included "More Hearts Than Mine" on the setlist for her November 18, 2021, show, which was part of her Feeling Things Tour (2021–2022).

In November 2021, American trio Girl Named Tom performed the song on the 21st season of The Voice. American singer Kelly Clarkson also covered "More Hearts Than Mine" for the "Kellyoke" segment of her variety talk show The Kelly Clarkson Show on February 3, 2022.

== Accolades ==
Awards and nominations for "More Hearts Than Mine"
Ceremony	Year	Category	Result	Ref.
Academy of Country Music Awards	2021	Single of the Year	Nominated	
BMI Country Awards	2020	Most-Performed Songs of the Year	Won	
CMT Music Awards	2020	Breakthrough Video of the Year	Nominated	
Country Music Association Awards	2020	Song of the Year	Nominated	
Grammy Awards	2020	Best Country Song	Nominated	
MusicRow Awards	2020	Song of the Year	Won	
Nashville Songwriter Awards	2020	Song of the Year	Won	

== Credits and personnel ==
Credits adapted from the liner notes of Lady Like.

Recording and management

- Recorded at Rosebank Studio (Nashville, Tennessee)
- Mixed at Larrabee Studios (North Hollywood, California)
- Mastered at Georgetown Masters (Nashville, Tennessee)
- Published by Songs of Universal Inc. / What Is an Ingrid / Straight from the Art Music / Songs for a Stone Heart / Universal Music Corp. / Happy Rock Publishing (BMI)

Personnel

- Sam Ellis – songwriter, producer, additional engineering, bass, acoustic guitar, electric guitar, piano, keyboards, programming, background vocals
- Ingrid Andress – lead vocals, songwriter, producer
- Derrick Southerland – songwriter
- Manny Marroquin – mixing
- Chris Galland – mixing engineer
- Robin Florent – mixing engineer assistant
- Scott Desmarais – mixing engineer assistant
- Devin Malone – baritone guitar, steel guitar
- Andrew Mendelson – mastering

== Charts ==
=== Weekly charts ===
Chart performance for "More Hearts Than Mine"
Chart (2019–2020)	Peak position
Canada (Canadian Hot 100)	55
Canada Country (Billboard)	4
US Billboard Hot 100	30
US Country Airplay (Billboard)	3
US Hot Country Songs (Billboard)	5

=== Year-end charts ===
2019 year-end chart performance for "More Hearts Than Mine"
Chart (2019)	Position
US Hot Country Songs (Billboard)	82

2020 year-end chart performance for "More Hearts Than Mine"
Chart (2020)	Position
US Country Airplay (Billboard)	15
US Hot Country Songs (Billboard)	20

== Certifications ==
Certifications for "More Hearts Than Mine"
Region	Certification	Certified units/sales
Canada (Music Canada)	2× Platinum	160,000^{‡}
United States (RIAA)	2× Platinum	2,000,000^{‡}
^{‡} Sales+streaming figures based on certification alone.

== Release history ==
Release dates and formats for "More Hearts Than Mine"
Region	Date	Format	Label	Ref.
Various	April 5, 2019	Digital download; streaming	Warner Music Nashville	
United States	June 12, 2019	Radio airplay	Warner Music Nashville	
United States	July 8, 2019	Country radio	Atlantic; Warner Music Nashville	
