= Good Person =

Studio album by Ingrid Andress
- Released: August 26, 2022
- Genre: Country pop
- Length: 44:03
- Label: Warner Music Nashville
- Producer: Ingrid Andress (all tracks); Sam Ellis (all tracks except 6 and 13); AJ Pruis (track 6); Jordan Schmidt (track 13)

Ingrid Andress chronology
| Lady Like (2020) | Good Person (2022) |

Singles from Good Person
- 1. "Wishful Drinking" Released: December 13, 2021; 2. "Seeing Someone Else" Released: September 26, 2022; 3. "Feel Like This" Released: February 6, 2023

Good Person is the second studio album by American singer-songwriter Ingrid Andress. It was released on August 26, 2022, via Warner Music Nashville. "Wishful Drinking", a duet with Sam Hunt, was released as the album's lead-off single in December 2021.

== Background ==
Andress co-wrote and co-produced all 13 tracks on Good Person, with additional producing done by Sam Ellis, AJ Pruis, and Jordan Schmidt. She co-wrote several tracks with Ellis and Derrick Southerland who contributed heavily to Lady Like, and also wrote with notable songwriters such as Shane McAnally, Julia Michaels, and JP Saxe.

Although Andress initially stated that she would not include her single "Wishful Drinking" on Good Person, it was featured as a bonus track on the digital versions of the album.

== Critical reception ==
Professional ratings
Review scores
| Source | Rating |
|---|---|
| AllMusic | 4/5 stars |
| Riff | 6/10 |
| Spectrum Culture | 3/5 stars |

AllMusic's Stephen Thomas Erlewine indicated that with Good Person, Andress "dedicat[ed] herself to flawlessly executing the blueprint she established on Lady Like". Tony Hicks of Riff called the album "a decent effort that doesn't really leave a lasting mark". Writing for Spectrum Culture, Justin Cober-Lake thought that Good Person "could have used more thoughtful construction as an album" but concluded that Andress is at the "phase of her career where she's simply laying a foundation".

== Singles and commercial performance ==
"Wishful Drinking" was released on August 2, 2021, and sent to country radio in December 2021 as the album's lead-off single. It became a top 5 hit on the Billboard Country Airplay chart, Andress' second and Hunt's 11th. It also peaked at number 47 on the Billboard Hot 100 and at number 11 on the Billboard Hot Country Songs chart. "Seeing Someone Else" was issued to the HAC format in September 2022 as the album's second single. It has since reached number 26 on that chart. "Feel Like This" was released on February 6, 2023, as the second single to country radio (third overall) from Good Person.

Good Person debuted at number 18 on the Billboard Top Country Albums chart.

== Promotion ==
Andress announced The Good Person Tour in support of the record, which kicks off on February 23, 2023, in Salt Lake City and runs until the end of May 2023. She also promoted the record as an opening act on Keith Urban's The Speed of Now World Tour.

== Track listing ==
Good Person track listing
| No. | Title | Writer(s) | Length |
|---|---|---|---|
| 1. | "Good Person" | Andress; Sam Ellis; Steph Jones | 3:10 |
| 2. | "Yearbook" | Andress; Pete Good; Shane McAnally; Derrick Southerland | 3:21 |
| 3. | "Seeing Someone Else" | Andress; Jesse Frasure; Southerland | 3:32 |
| 4. | "Talk" | Andress; Tommy Gee; Mich Hedin Hansen; David Nills Mattias Fremburg; Alex Stacey | 3:12 |
| 5. | "How Honest Do You Want Me to Be?" | Andress; Ellis; Southerland | 3:23 |
| 6. | "No Choice" | Andress; AJ Pruis; Liz Rose | 3:34 |
| 7. | "Pain" | Andress; Ellis; Laura Veltz | 3:14 |
| 8. | "Feel Like This" | Andress; Ellis; Julia Michaels | 2:43 |
| 9. | "Blue" | Andress; Ellis; McAnally; Southerland | 3:27 |
| 10. | "Falling for You" | Andress; Ellis; Southerland | 3:08 |
| 11. | "All the Love" | Andress; Ellis; Southerland | 2:56 |
| 12. | "Things That Haven't Happened Yet" | Andress; Ellis; Southerland | 3:12 |

Digital bonus track
| No. | Title | Writer(s) | Length |
|---|---|---|---|
| 13. | "Wishful Drinking" (with Sam Hunt) | Andress; Johnny Price; JP Saxe; Lucky Daye; Rykeyz | 3:14 |
| Total length: | | | 44:03 |

Deluxe edition
| No. | Title | Writer(s) | Length |
|---|---|---|---|
| 1. | "Treated Me Good" | Andress; Ellis; Southerland | 3:20 |
| 2. | "Wish You Would" | Andress; Dave Barnes; Paul DiGiovanni | 4:18 |
| 3. | "Runnin" (with JP Saxe) | Andress; Ryan Marrone; Saxe | 3:26 |
| Total length: | | | 55:09 |

== Charts ==
Chart performance for Good Person
| Chart (2022) | Peak position |
|---|---|
| US Billboard 200 | 173 |
| US Top Country Albums (Billboard) | 18 |
