= Feel Like This =

Single by Ingrid Andress

from the album Good Person
- Released: February 6, 2023
- Genre: Country
- Length: 3:16 (album version); 2:43 (radio edit)
- Label: Warner Nashville
- Songwriters: Ingrid Andress; Sam Ellis; Julia Michaels
- Producers: Ingrid Andress; Sam Ellis

Ingrid Andress singles chronology
"Seeing Someone Else" (2022)	"Feel Like This" (2023)

Music video
- "Feel Like This" on YouTube

"Feel Like This" is a song by American country music artist Ingrid Andress. It was released to country radio on February 6, 2023 as the third single from Andress' second studio album Good Person. Andress co-wrote the song with Sam Ellis and Julia Michaels, the former of whom also produced it.

== Background and composition ==
"Feel Like This" is a country song. It came to fruition when Ingrid Andress and Julia Michaels aligned their schedules to write together at the home of Sam Ellis and realized that both were in the same stage of their current relationships: "Her and I had recently gotten out of bad relationships, and then we had both randomly just started falling in love with new people, so it was very organic. We were telling our story and our journey to how we got there because we both at the time were just in such a happy place romantically." In it, Andress shares her relationship struggles with "emotional abuse" and "toxic situations", leading up to finding love and basking in "a new relationship that feels like home".

== Critical reception ==
Maddie Street of V Magazine wrote that the song is "a ultra-personal deep dive into the dichotomy between Ingrid's past and her newfound relationship optimism. Pushing for bold, experimental sounds that blended banjos with vocoders, Andress swung from sweeping orchestration to spare, acoustic-based arrangements, delving into the innermost levels of her vocal range".

== Music video and live performances ==
The music video for "Feel Like This" premiered on August 31, 2022, before its release as a single. Directed by Olivia Bee, the video follows Andress as she goes through the stages of a breakup from a toxic relationship, and then transitioning to her falling in love with a new man, with scenes of them riding a motorcycle together and slow dancing in a field.

As part of her Feeling Things Tour, Andress sang "Feel Like This" at her November 19, 2021 show. She performed the song on April 29, 2022 at Stagecoach Festival. On August 26, 2022, Andress gave a rendition of the single on Jimmy Kimmel Live!. While supporting Keith Urban on his The Speed of Now World Tour, Andress included "Feel Like This" on her setlist at Nationwide Arena on September 23, 2022. She appeared on The Late Show with Stephen Colbert on January 12, 2023 to perform the song.

== Charts ==
Chart performance for "Feel Like This"
Chart (2023)	Peak position
US Country Airplay (Billboard)	60
