= 2020 CMT Music Awards =

Annual US country music awards ceremony

- Date: October 21, 2020
- Location: Nashville, Tennessee
- Hosted by: Kane Brown; Sarah Hyland; Ashley McBryde

Highlights
- Most wins: Carrie Underwood (2)
- Most nominations: Luke Combs (4)

Television/radio coverage
- Network: CMT

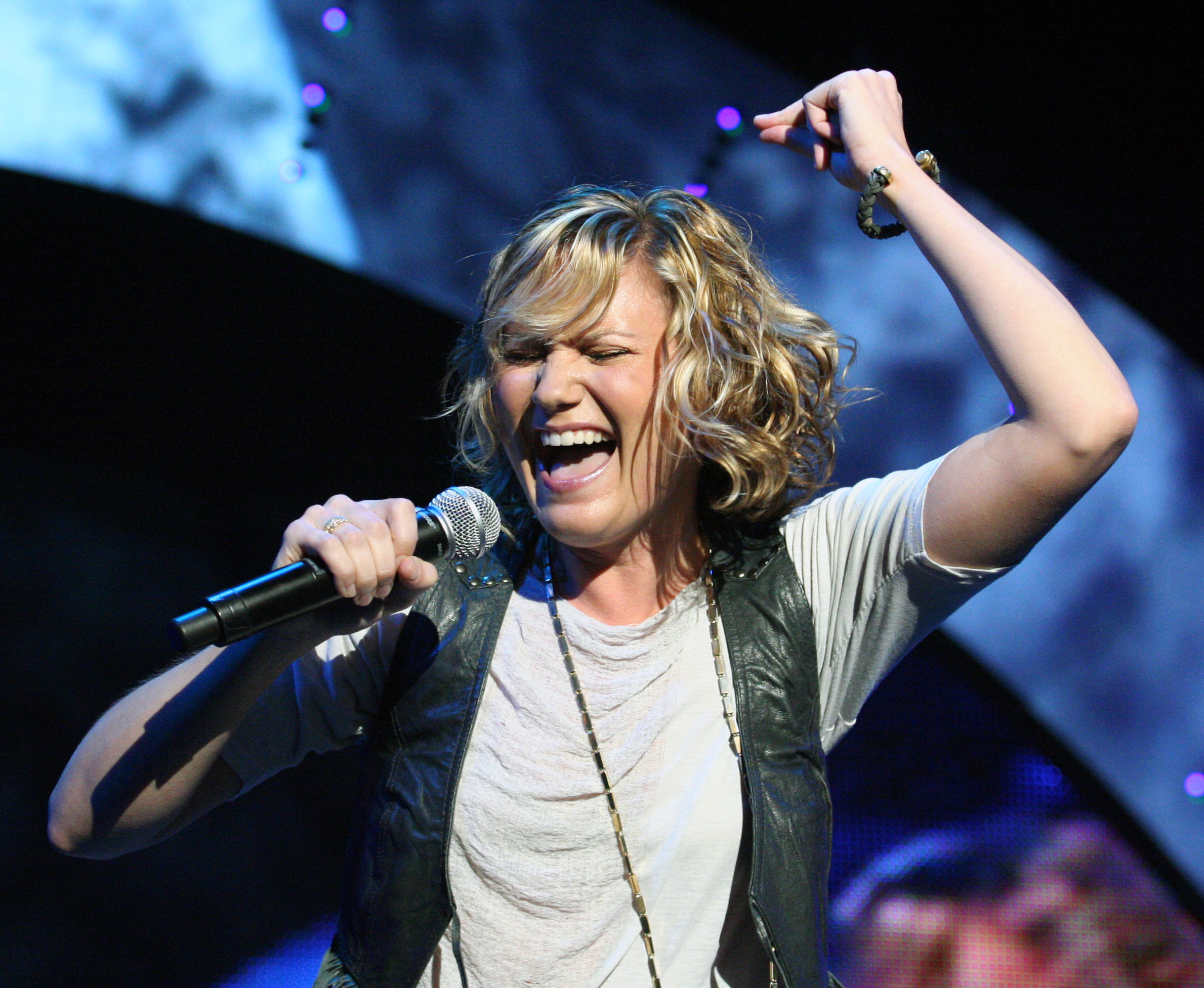
CMT Equal Play honoree, Jennifer Nettles, of superstar duo, Sugarland.

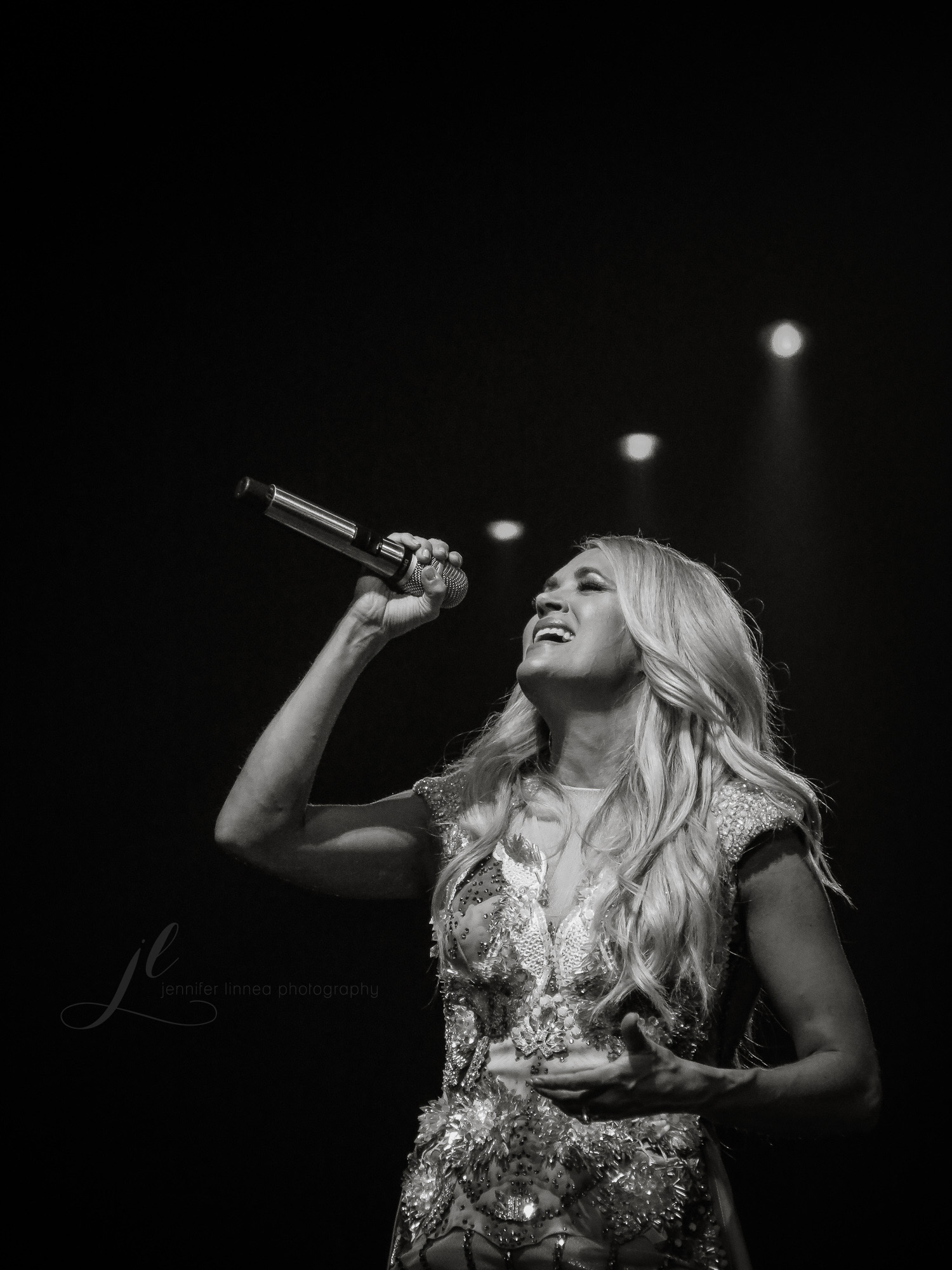
Winner of Video of the Year and Female Video of the Year, Carrie Underwood.

The 2020 CMT Music Awards were held in Nashville, Tennessee on October 21, 2020. Kane Brown, Sarah Hyland and Ashley McBryde were the hosts for the show. The CMT Music Awards are a fan-voted awards show for country music videos and television performances; Voting takes place on CMT's website.

American singer and record producer Jennifer Nettles was honored with the CMT Equal Play Award for her outspokenness and advocacy for women in country music.

== Winners and nominees ==
Nominees were announced on September 23, 2020. Winners are shown in bold.

Video of the Year	Female Video of the Year
**Carrie Underwood** — **“Drinking Alone”**; Keith Urban — “Polaroid”; Tanya Tucker — “Bring My Flowers Now”	**Carrie Underwood** — **“Drinking Alone”**; Ashley McBryde — “One Night Standards”; Gabby Barrett — “I Hope”; Kelsea Ballerini — “homecoming queen?”; Maren Morris — “The Bones”; Miranda Lambert — “Bluebird”
Male Video of the Year	Group Video of the Year
**Luke Bryan** — **“One Margarita”**; Jason Aldean — “Got What I Got”; Luke Combs — “Even Though I'm Leaving”; Morgan Wallen — “Chasin' You (Dream Video)”; Sam Hunt — “Hard To Forget”; Thomas Rhett — “Remember You Young”	**Old Dominion** — **“One Man Band”**; Lady A — “Champagne Night”; Little Big Town — “Wine, Beer, Whiskey”; Midland — “Cheatin' Songs (Live From the Palomino)”; The Chicks — “Gaslighter”; The Highwomen — “Crowded Table”
Duo Video of the Year	Breakthrough Video of the Year
**Dan + Shay** — **“I Should Probably Go To Bed”**; Brothers Osborne — “All Night (Studio Performance)”; Florida Georgia Line — “Blessings”; LOCASH — “One Big Country Song”; Maddie & Tae — “Die From A Broken Heart”	**Gabby Barrett** — **“I Hope”**; Blanco Brown — “The Git Up”; Caylee Hammack — “Family Tree”; Ingrid Andress — “More Hearts Than Mine”; Riley Green — “I Wish Grandpas Never Died”; Travis Denning — “After a Few”
Collaborative Video of the Year	CMT Performance of the Year
**Blake Shelton** and **Gwen Stefani** — **“Nobody But You”**; Carly Pearce and Lee Brice — “I Hope You're Happy Now”; Dan + Shay and Justin Bieber — “10,000 Hours”; Kane Brown and Nelly — “Cool Again”; Marshmello and Kane Brown — “One Thing Right”; Thomas Rhett and Jon Pardi — “Beer Can't Fix”	**From 2019 CMT Artists of the Year: Chris Young —** **“Drowning”**; From 2019 CMT Artists of the Year: Ashley McBryde — “One Night Standards”; From CMT Crossroads: Brooks & Dunn and Luke Combs — “Brand New Man”; From CMT Crossroads: Halsey and Kelsea Ballerini — “Graveyard”; From 2019 CMT Artists of the Year: Sam Hunt — “Fancy”; From CMT Crossroads: Sheryl Crow and Chris Stapleton —“Tell Me When It's Over”
Quarantine Video of the Year
**Granger Smith** — **"Don't Cough on Me!"**; Big & Rich — "Stay Home"; Brad Paisley — "No I in Beer"; Carly Pearce — "It Won’t Always Be Like This"; Charlie Worsham and Various Artists — "With a Little Help From My Friends"; Dave Haywood and Kelli Haywood — "Just Another Day in Quarantine"; Dolly Parton — "When Life Is Good Again"; Luke Combs — "Six Feet Apart"; Tenille Townes, Abby Anderson, Kassi Ashton, Keelan Donovan, Alex Hall, Adam Hambrick and Caylee Hammack — "Lean on Me"; Thomas Rhett, Reba McEntire, Hillary Scott, Chris Tomlin and Keith Urban — "Be a Light"
CMT Equal Play Award
**Jennifer Nettles**
