= Good Time Goes =

2026 single by Dallas Smith

Single by Dallas Smith
- Released: June 26, 2026
- Genre: Country
- Length: 3:12
- Label: Big Loud; Local Hay; Mercury
- Songwriters: Sam Ellis; McCoy Moore; Blake Pendergrass
- Producer: Jacob Durrett

Dallas Smith singles chronology
"One Good Life" (2025)	"Good Time Goes" (2026)	"Leave Me Like a Backroad" (2026)

Music video
- "Good Time Goes" on YouTube

"Good Time Goes" is a song recorded by Canadian country music artist Dallas Smith. The song was written by Sam Ellis, McCoy Moore, and Blake Pendergrass, while Jacob Durrett produced the track. The song marked Smith's first solo release since 2023, and is the debut single off an upcoming project.

== Background ==
In a press release, Smith remarked that "Good Time Goes" felt like the "perfect song to introduce this next chapter" of his music after several years of heavy touring. He stated that he "wanted the first song out of the gate to have some energy and feel-good momentum behind it".

== Music video ==
The official music video for "Good Time Goes" premiered on YouTube on June 26, 2026.

== Credits and personnel ==
Credits adapted from Apple Music.

- Jessie Addleman – photography
- Jane Anderson – graphic design
- Scott Cooke – immersive mixing engineer, immersive mastering engineer, recording engineer
- Jacob Durrett – production, programming
- Jonny Fung – electric guitar
- Mark Hill – bass
- Dannon Johnson – recording engineer
- Trey Keller – background vocals
- Andrew Mendelson – mastering engineer
- Eivind Nordland – mixing engineer
- Louis Remenapp – recording engineer
- Jerry Roe – drums, tambourine
- Dallas Smith – vocals
- Bryan Sutton – acoustic guitar
- Ryan Yount – recording engineer

== Charts ==
Weekly chart performance for "Good Time Goes"
Chart (2026)	Peak position
Australia Country Hot 50 (The Music)	30
Canada Hot 100 (Billboard)	58
Canada CHR/Top 40 (Billboard)	40
Canada Country (Billboard)	5
