= No Saint =

2019 album by Lauren Jenkins

Studio album by Lauren Jenkins
- Released: March 15, 2019
- Studio: Benchmark Studios (Nashville); Love Shack Studios (Nashville); PocketStudio (Note: The location of PocketStudio is not indicated on AllMusic.); Ronnie's Place Studio (Nashville); Sound Stage Studios (Nashville); The Drag House (Nashville); The Red Room (Nashville)
- Genre: Americana; country; pop; rock
- Length: 35:56
- Label: Big Machine
- Producer: Lauren Jenkins; Julian Raymond; Trey Bruce; Matt Dragstrem; Ross Copperman

Lauren Jenkins chronology
The Nashville Sessions EP (2016)	No Saint (2019)	Miles on Me, Part 1 (2021)

No Saint is the debut studio album by American singer-songwriter Lauren Jenkins. Big Machine Records released it on March 15, 2019. Before she was signed to the aforementioned label, Jenkins performed at various establishments. Her producer sent demos he had worked on with her to several labels, and she signed with Big Machine. An Americana, country, pop, and rock album, No Saint focuses on themes of alcohol, romance, and self-doubt. She co-wrote all of the album's songs and co-produced six of them.

Critics gave positive reviews to No Saint, who praised Jenkins's vocals. It peaked at numbers 7 and 18 on the Billboard Heatseekers Albums and Top Country Albums charts, respectively. The album was accompanied by a short film, Running Out of Road (2019), which Jenkins co-wrote, co-produced, and starred in. She further promoted No Saint by singing tracks from it at the "Billboard Live Featuring CMT Next Women Of Country" event organized by Billboard with CMT and on Ricky Ross's radio show.

== Background ==
Jenkins showed an early interest in music. At 15, she moved to Memphis, Tennessee, and she began performing in nightclubs using a fake identity document. She sought out coffee shops and airports where she could perform in North Carolina and she went to open mic nights. Jenkins later studied acting and performed in New York City. In 2013, Jenkins's producer, Trey Bruce, submitted demos they worked on together to various record labels. Big Machine Records's CEO Scott Borchetta called Bruce, and Jenkins was subsequently signed to the label in the same year.

On the 2014 Mötley Crüe tribute album Nashville Outlaws: A Tribute to Mötley Crüe, Jenkins sang a country cover of the band's "Looks That Kill". Big Machine issued her debut extended play The Nashville Sessions EP in 2016. Her debut single, "Give Up the Ghost", was released in October 2018. On November 16, MusicRow reported that No Saint would be released on March 15, 2019. Billboard's Annie Reuter pointed out that her "passion for storytelling" is displayed throughout the album; the packaging was decorated with Jenkins' hand-written lyrics and with photos that she took. Big Machine distributed No Saint on March 15, 2019, for the CD, LP, digital download, and streaming formats.

== Music and lyrics ==
Jenkins stated that the album consisted of songs "from [her] first chapter of coming to Nashville" while others were "from the chapter [she is] in right now". According to critics, the album comprises the Americana, country, pop, and rock genres. The Day's Rick Koster stated that No Saint is a "hook-festooned" combination of honky-tonk, rock, and ballads. Jon Pareles from The New York Times wrote that No Saint covers Jenkins's "bitter tidings" with "gleaming guitars and bright harmonies". Her vocal delivery was compared to that of singers Sheryl Crow and Stevie Nicks by Pareles and Hal Horowitz of American Songwriter. Jenkins's voice employs "multiple personalities" on No Saint, according to Tom Roland of Billboard. Jenkins co-wrote all of the album's tracks, co-produced six of them and also worked with Bruce and producers Julian Raymond, Matt Dragstrem, and Ross Copperman. The songs were recorded at various studios in Nashville.

The album's main themes are alcohol, romance, and self-doubt. On "Give Up the Ghost", the first track on No Saint, Jenkins pleads for her lover to focus on their current relationship instead of reminiscing a previous one. "You'll Never Know" details an unrequited love. A Taste of Country reviewer compared it to tracks on singer-songwriter Taylor Swift's Red (2012) album. "Maker's Mark and You" describes Jenkins indulging in drinking and smoking to recover from heartbreak. The song contains references to bourbon whiskey Maker's Mark and cigarette brand Marlboro. Similar to the previous track, "Payday" discusses alcohol use to suppress "the pain one paycheck at a time". Rolling Stone writer Marissa R. Moss believed that the song may have been a hit if a "dude in a trucker hat" performed it. She struggles to forgive her lover for their wrongdoings in the title track and she stated that it is a "confession to the fact that" she is "flawed, and at times broken". Both "Cadillac" and "Running Out of Road" are about "hitting the highway". The latter is a mid-tempo ballad which, according to Billboard's Annie Reuter, is a metaphor for Jenkins's career. Jenkins relates how she is getting over a former lover who is attending a bar with a new girlfriend that she frequents on "My Bar". The closing track, "Blood", was composed for someone whom Jenkins observes ruining themselves through their use of drugs and alcohol.

== Promotion ==
Big Machine made the single "Maker's Mark and You" available on November 18, 2018. None of her songs were sent to radio stations. She explained that artists could be dropped from their record labels if their releases underperformed at radio and she did not want "to spend money to force people to play [her] music". In a May 2020 interview with Rolling Stone, Jenkins revealed that Big Machine had planned to submit a radio edit of "Running Out of Road" for airplay, but those plans did not come to fruition. Prior to No Saint's release, Jenkins performed "Give Up the Ghost" on Bobby Bones's radio show in January 2019 and "Running Out of Road" on morning television show Today on February 7. To accompany No Saint, Jenkins co-wrote, co-produced, and starred in the short film Running Out of Road. It was filmed in New Mexico and comprises the music videos for the tracks "Running Out of Road, "No Saint", and "Maker's Mark and You". The short film premiered on March 13 at the Violent Crown Cinema during the Austin City Limits Music Festival. Koster deemed it an "impressive companion piece" to No Saint. Ross indicated that Jenkins combined music and acting "in ways not currently common practice in country". In June, she performed songs from the album at the "Billboard Live Featuring CMT Next Women Of Country" event hosted by Billboard and CMT. Jenkins appeared on Ricky Ross's radio show Another Country with Ricky Ross to sing tracks from No Saint on February 4, 2020.

== Reception ==
Professional ratings
Review scores
Source	Rating
AllMusic	4.5/5 stars
American Songwriter	3/5 stars

No Saint received positive reviews from music critics. Reviewers highlighted Jenkins's vocal delivery on the album. AllMusic's Stephen Thomas Erlewine explained that Jenkins's voice is the "first striking thing" about the album; he compared her voice to Norah Jones's and felt that it gives certain songs depth. Erlewine deemed No Saint a "bold" album and that its blend of pop, cabaret and Americana is "invigorating". According to Annie Reuter of Billboard, No Saint has been recognized for Jenkins's "smoky vocals and vivid storytelling". Moss said that Jenkins's vocals are "raw at times", "refreshing", and distinctive. A Taste of Country reviewer indicated that Jenkins ignored all rules about what country music is with No Saint and that she came out with a recognizable sound which makes her "impossible to define". Horowitz thought the album's breakup theme was "questionable", but concluded that Jenkins's presence is "distinctive, always believable" and "earthy". Reviews by Taste of Country, Horowitz, and Moss, believed that No Saint made Jenkins stand out as a new artist.

Rolling Stone placed No Saint at number 37 on their "40 Best Country and Americana Albums of 2019" list and AllMusic included it on their "Favorite Country Albums of 2019" list. Commercially, the album ranked on Billboard charts Top Country Albums and Heatseekers Albums at numbers 18 and 7, respectively.

== Track listing ==
Credits adapted from the liner notes of No Saint.

No Saint – Standard edition
No.	Title	Writer(s)	Producer(s)	Length
1.	"Give Up the Ghost"	Lauren Jenkins; Emily Shackelton	Jenkins; Julian Raymond	3:26
2.	"You'll Never Know"	Jenkins; Ross Copperman; Heather Morgan	Jenkins; Raymond	2:49
3.	"Maker's Mark and You"	Jenkins; Jessie Jo Dillon; Aaron Eshuis	Jenkins; Raymond	3:25
4.	"Payday"	Jenkins; Ingrid Andress; Joel Weldon Willis	Jenkins; Raymond	3:20
5.	"No Saint"	Jenkins; Andress	Jenkins; Raymond	3:44
6.	"Running Out of Road"	Jenkins; Andress; Dillon; Tina Parol	Jenkins; Raymond	4:48
7.	"Cadillac"	Jenkins; Trey Bruce	Bruce	3:58
8.	"My Bar"	Jenkins; Matt Dragstrem; Liz Rose	Dragstrem	2:37
9.	"All Good Things"	Jenkins; Copperman; Blair Daly; Shane McAnally	Copperman	3:11
10.	"Blood"	Jenkins; Bruce	Bruce	4:38
Total length:				35:56

No Saint – Big Machine Radio Release Special
No.	Title	Length
1.	"Radio Intro"	3:47
2.	"Give up the Ghost (interview)"	1:44
4.	"You'll Never Know (interview)"	1:31
6.	"Maker's Mark and You (interview)"	2:24
8.	"Payday (interview)"	1:39
10.	"No Saint (interview)"	2:34
12.	"Running out of Road (interview)"	1:53
14.	"Cadillac (interview)"	1:14
16.	"My Bar (interview)"	1:46
18.	"All Good Things (interview)"	2:31
20.	"Blood (interview)"	3:02
Total length:		60:01

== Personnel ==
Credits adapted from the liner notes of No Saint and AllMusic.

- Ingrid Andress – background vocals
- David Axelrod – editing, vocal engineer
- Stephanie Bentley – background vocals
- Sandi Spika Borchetta – art direction
- Scott Borchetta – executive producer
- Mike Brignardello – bass
- Trey Bruce – percussion, producer, background vocals
- David Buchanan – engineer, mixing
- Pat Buchanan – electric guitar
- Tom Bukovac – electric guitar
- Adam Chagnon – engineer
- Michael Church – photography
- Ross Copperman – bass, drums, engineer, acoustic guitar, electric guitar, keyboards, producer, background vocals
- J. T. Corenflos – electric guitar
- Garrett Creamer – photography
- Blair Daly – background vocals
- Matt Dragstrem – bass, drums, engineer, acoustic guitar, electric guitar, keyboards, producer, background vocals
- Fred Eltringham – drums
- John Ryan Flaherty – photography
- Justin Ford – art direction, graphic design
- Justin Francis – assistant engineer
- Jason Garner – synthesizer
- Mike Griffith – production coordination
- Tony Harrell – keyboards, piano
- Lauren Jenkins – photography, producer, background vocals
- Ted Jansen – mastering
- Charlie Judge – keyboards
- Nik Karpen – mixing assistant
- Laurel Kittleson – production coordination
- Tim Lauer – keyboards
- Chris Lord-Alge – mixing
- Kam Luchterhand – assistant engineer
- Shane McAnally – background vocals
- Greg Morrow – drums, programming
- Jack Noble – photography
- Russ Pahl – steel guitar
- Julian Raymond – assistant, producer
- Becky Reiser – art direction, graphic design
- Doug Rich – production coordination
- Zoe Rosen – assistant
- Chris Rowe – mixing
- Jimmie Lee Sloas – bass
- Janice Soled – production coordination
- Brianna Steinitz – production coordination
- Ilya Toshinskiy – banjo, acoustic guitar, resonator
- Walker/Smith – photography
- Ron Wallace – background vocals
- Howard Willing – engineer, mixing
- Jonathan Yudkin – cello, mandolin

== Charts ==
Chart performance for No Saint
Chart (2019)	Peak position
US Heatseekers Albums (Billboard)	7
US Top Country Albums (Billboard)	18
