= Lauren Jenkins =

American singer-songwriter (born 1991)

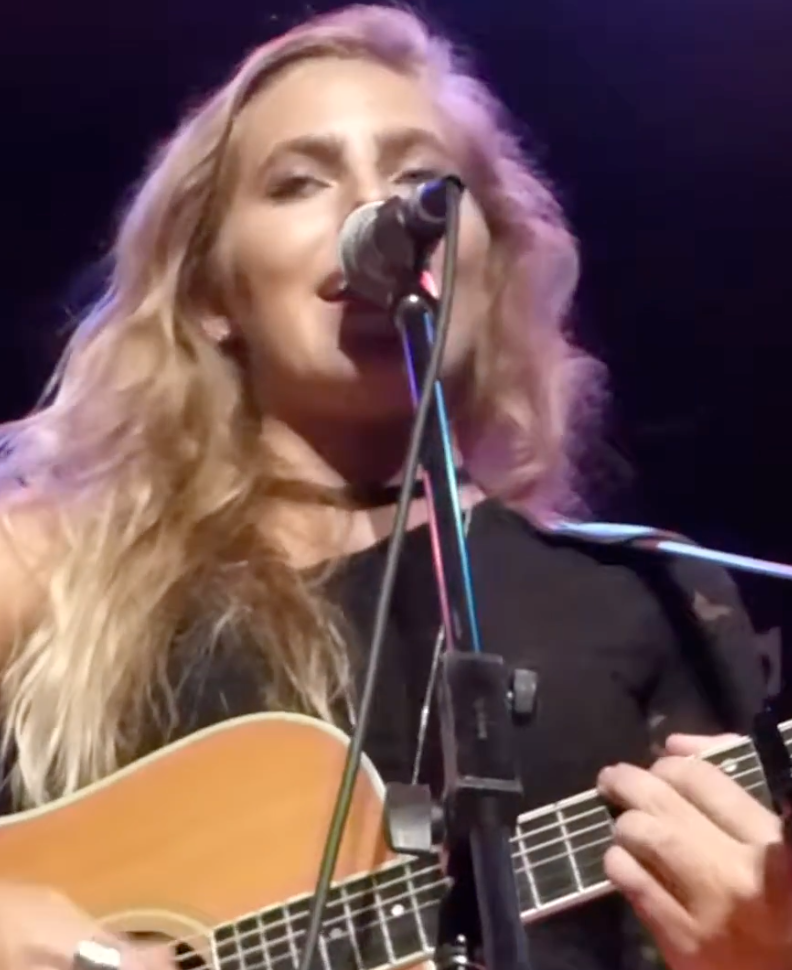
- Jenkins performing in July 2017
- Born: Lauren Elizabeth Jenkins; September 16, 1991 (age 35); Arlington, Texas, U.S.
- Education: William Esper Studio
- Occupations: Singer-songwriter; actress; director
- Years active: 2009–present
- Spouse: Patrick Davis (m. 2022)
- Musical career
- Origin: Memphis, Tennessee, U.S.
- Genres: Americana; country pop
- Instruments: Vocals; guitar
- Labels: Big Machine; Independent
- Website: laurenjenkins.com

Lauren Elizabeth Jenkins (born September 16, 1991) is an American singer-songwriter. Throughout her teenage years, Jenkins performed regularly at nightclubs in various states, before settling in New York City to study acting. While involved with the film industry, she landed the role of Trey Campbell in Deadline (2012). Big Machine Records would sign Jenkins as a recording artist in 2013 and release her debut extended play (EP) The Nashville Sessions EP in 2016. This was followed by her debut studio album, No Saint (2019), which ranked on Billboard's Top Country Albums and Heatseekers Albums charts. After being removed from Big Machine's roster in March 2020, she independently released her second EP Miles on Me, Part 1 in July 2021.

== Life and career ==
=== 1991–2012: Early life and career beginnings ===
Lauren Elizabeth Jenkins was born on September 16, 1991, in Arlington, Texas, and raised in South Carolina. She has a younger sister whom she considers one of her role models. When Jenkins was six years old, her father took her to her first concert and around the age of eight, she began writing songs. As a child, she often attended concerts with her father. Jenkins stated that her musical inspirations include "acts like Tom Petty and The Allman Brothers Band". During high school, she was a competitive swimmer and participated in the AAU Junior Olympic Games. At age 15, Jenkins bought a car and an acoustic guitar and moved to Memphis, Tennessee. Jenkins also briefly resided in Charleston, South Carolina, and Charlotte, North Carolina. She began homeschooling so she could travel and pursue a career in music. Around that time, she earned money from modeling for Mello Yello and Coca-Cola, and co-hosting Jerry Lawler's wrestling television show Jerry Lawler's Memphis Wrestling. Jenkins sang in nightclubs using a fake identity document on the East Coast following her relocation to Memphis. She also attended open mic nights and sought out coffee shops and airports where she could perform throughout North Carolina. Jenkins left Memphis and moved to New York City to follow her acting career "more seriously". After performing regularly in the latter city, Jenkins would settle there to attend the William Esper Studio school for acting. While splitting her time between New York City and Los Angeles, Jenkins worked on the set of Cigarette Girl (2009) and starred as a bartender in both N-Secure (2010) and Tough Trade (2010). In 2012, she played Trey Campbell in the mystery drama film Deadline (2012). It received generally negative reviews from film critics.

=== 2013–2019: Signing with Big Machine and No Saint ===
Trey Bruce, Jenkins's producer, sent demos he had worked on with her to various record labels in 2013. Bruce received a phone call from Big Machine Records's CEO Scott Borchetta which resulted in Jenkins booking a flight to Nashville, Tennessee, the next day. She would sign a record deal with Big Machine in the same year. Among others, Jenkins was one of the opening acts for Brantley Gilbert, The Band Perry and Justin Moore for the Super Weekend at the Brickyard event held in July 2014. The aforementioned label released a Mötley Crüe tribute album titled Nashville Outlaws: A Tribute to Mötley Crüe in August, which includes a country cover of the band's "Looks That Kill" by Jenkins. Chuck Dauphin from Billboard named her in January 2015 one of the "10 Hot Country Artists to Watch in 2015". In March 2016, it was reported that she would be one of the acts performing at the Carolina Country Music Fest held in June. On May 27, 2016, Big Machine released The Nashville Sessions EP as Jenkins's debut extended play (EP) which "captures [Jenkins's] love of country, Southern rock and Americana", according to James Reed of Rolling Stone. She co-wrote four of the songs and included her covers of Robert Palmer's "Addicted to Love" and "Looks That Kill" on it. Furthermore, Jenkins was an opening act for Lady A and LeAnn Rimes during the summer of 2016. In 2017, she directed a music video for fellow singer-songwriter Ingrid Andress's single "The Stranger".

Big Machine released "Give Up the Ghost" as Jenkins's debut single in October 2018, however it was not serviced to radio stations as she wanted to "give people a chance" to see if they would like it. On November 16, Jenkins announced that her debut studio album, titled No Saint, was set for release on March 15, 2019. Big Machine released the single "Maker's Mark and You" on the same day. Bobby Bones selected Jenkins as part of his "Class of 2019" artists in January 2019. Upon being chosen as Elvis Duran's Artist of the Month in February, she made her debut on Today on the seventh of that month. Jenkins performed at country music festival C2C: Country to Country in March. Two days before her first album's release, Jenkins premiered its accompanying short film Running out of Road (2019), which she co-wrote, co-produced, and starred in, at the Violent Crown Cinema during the Austin City Limits Music Festival. No Saint was issued on March 15 by Big Machine. The record consists of an Americana, country, indie, pop and rock sound; she co-wrote every song on the album. No Saint was released to positive reviews, and peaked at numbers 7 and 18 on Billboard's Heatseekers Albums and Top Country Albums charts, respectively. Jenkins performed songs from the album at Billboard's and CMT's "Billboard Live Featuring CMT Next Women Of Country" event on June 3. Also in June, she was one of the performing artists at the CMA Music Festival. On September 15, Jenkins sang at O2 Academy Glasgow.

=== 2020–present: Departure from Big Machine and Miles on Me ===
In June 2019, Jenkins appeared as a guest DJ on SiriusXM's E Street Radio, hosting a program centered on the music of Bruce Springsteen. In January 2020, she released interpretations of Springsteen's "Hungry Heart" and "Stolen Car", both from his 1980 album The River. The recordings premiered on E Street Radio before their digital release on January 17, 2020. In early 2020, Jenkins was the supporting act for the European leg of Brett Eldredge's tour. She appeared on Ricky Ross's Another Country with Ricky Ross radio show on BBC Radio Scotland in February to perform songs from No Saint. On March 5 Jenkins learned from a Big Machine staffer that the label had dropped her. Additionally, Jenkins was going to embark on a European and United Kingdom tour in the same year, which was ultimately canceled. Her first independent release was "Ain't That Hard", which was unveiled in May 2020. Jenkins revealed in July 2021 that her second EP, Miles on Me, would be released in three parts, with its first part being released in the same month. She told American Songwriter that when the COVID-19 pandemic began, she abandoned work on her second studio album and instead conceived Miles on Me over three studio sessions throughout 2020.

== Artistry and personal life ==
Reed labeled Jenkins a "natural country-pop star" and MusicRow's Liza Anderson described her as an "Americana singer-songwriter". In reviews of No Saint, music critics highlighted Jenkins's vocal delivery. AllMusic's Stephen Thomas Erlewine wrote that her voice is the "first striking thing" when listening to the album. According to Tom Roland from Billboard, Jenkins's voice makes use of "multiple personalities". He regarded her lower resonance as "haunting and spooky" as well as her upper register being "biting and forceful". Marissa R. Moss of Rolling Stone stated that Jenkins was "never afraid" to showcase her vocal delivery on No Saint. Billboard's Annie Reuter noted that the album has been recognized for her "smoky vocals and vivid storytelling". Jenkins's vocals have also been compared to those of Norah Jones, Sheryl Crow, and Stevie Nicks. No Saint comprises themes of romance, self-doubt, and alcohol.

Throughout 2020, Jenkins performed live on social media platforms to help sustain herself and had given over 100 concerts by October. According to her, the tips she received from the viewers were "paying [her] bills". In 2022, she had hip replacement surgery as she suffered from chronic pain which was caused by extensive touring. During a songwriter's event in Napa, California in 2021, musician Patrick Davis proposed to Jenkins. The pair had previously performed at charity events together. They wed on October 15, 2022, at Lookout Mountain, Georgia. Jenkins moved to Nashville in 2013, where she resides with Davis. The couple sang at Bret Saberhagen's cancer charity event "Strike Out" in September 2022.

== Discography ==
=== Studio albums ===
List of studio albums, with selected chart positions
Title	Album details	Peak chart positions	
Title	Album details	US Country	US Heat
No Saint	Released: March 15, 2019; Label: Big Machine; Formats: CD, LP, digital download, streaming	18	7

=== Extended plays ===
List of extended plays
Title	EP details
The Nashville Sessions EP	Released: May 27, 2016; Label: Big Machine; Formats: Digital download, streaming
Miles on Me, Part 1	Released: July 9, 2021; Label: Independent; Formats: Digital download, streaming

=== Singles ===
==== As lead artist ====
List of singles as lead artist
Title	Year	Album
"Give Up the Ghost"	2018	No Saint
"Maker's Mark and You"	2018	No Saint
"Ain't That Hard"	2020	Non-album single
"Like You Found Me"	2021	Miles on Me, Part 1

==== Promotional singles ====
List of promotional singles
Title	Year	Album
"Hungry Heart / Stolen Car"	2020	Non-album promotional singles

==== Guest appearances ====
List of guest appearances
Title	Year	Album
"Looks That Kill"	2014	Nashville Outlaws: A Tribute to Mötley Crüe
