= Boys (Charli XCX song) =

2017 single by Charli XCX

Single by Charli XCX
- Released: 26 July 2017
- Genre: Electropop; minimal pop; bubblegum pop
- Length: 2:42
- Label: Asylum; Atlantic UK
- Songwriters: Cass Lowe; Jerker Hansson; Ari Leff; Emily Warren; Ingrid Andress; Michael Pollack
- Producer: Jerker Olov Hansson

Charli XCX singles chronology
"Love Gang" (2017)	"Boys" (2017)	"Dirty Sexy Money" (2017)

Music video
- "Boys" on YouTube

"Boys" is a song by British singer Charli XCX, released on 26 July 2017 by Asylum Records and Atlantic Records UK. The song was originally intended to be the second single from her then-upcoming third studio album. However, the song became a stand-alone single when the projected third album was leaked on the internet and cancelled. The song makes use of a sample from the Nintendo video game Super Mario Bros.

A cover of the song by one of its writers, Ingrid Andress, is included on the deluxe edition reissue of Andress' debut studio album, Lady Like (2020), with a mandolin being used to replicate the video game sample.

In 2018, Charli XCX recorded a Mandarin version of the song which was produced by Beijing DJ Howie Lee and released on Chinese social media sites. The remix, which featured a verse by Malaysian singer Jeanie, was eventually released on streaming and digital download in the Chinese market.

== Background ==
"Boys" was written by Cass Lowe, Jerker Hansson, Lauv, Emily Warren, Ingrid Andress, and Michael Pollack. Pollack described "Boys" as "one of those Frankenstein songs", referencing the number of contributors involved at various stages of its development. According to Pollack, the track originated with Jerker Hansson, who composed the chorus, instrumental track, and a distinctive Foley-style sound effect placed between the chorus lines. Pollack later received the track from Brandon Davis, who had intended for him to use it for a different artist he was working with at the time. Impressed by the scale and impact of its chorus, Pollack invited singer Lauv, with whom he was staying at the time, along with Andress, to collaborate on the song.

Andress took credit for the song's lyrical concept, having confronted her two male co-writers about her belief that women are seldom afforded the same freedom as men to openly discuss their sexual experiences. She recalled joining Pollack and Lauv after leaving an earlier songwriting session where men had been sharing stories about various women they had been involved with, which prompted her to approach the topic from a female perspective. She described the writing process for "Boys" as unique due to the absence of a recording artist in the writers' room, which allowed her and her collaborators the freedom "to write about something that resonated with us". Lauv, meanwhile, appreciated the opportunity to work on a song that was "a little bit outside of my typical wheelhouse", compared to the emotionally-charged music he writes for himself. Together, they completed the verses and pre-chorus. When they next heard the song, it had undergone further revisions from Warren and Lowe, who had contributed a rewritten pre-chorus and the addition of a bridge.

"Boys" is one of the few songs in Charli XCX's discography that she did not write. The singer received the song while traveling across the United States on a promotional radio tour. Despite rarely accepting or performing songs she didn't write herself, she thoroughly enjoyed "Boys" once she heard it. Due to her lack of involvement in the writing process, she explained that lyrically, to her, the song is simply "about genuinely just thinking about boys".

== Critical reception ==
"Boys" received positive reviews. Pitchfork named the song the 'Best New Track', and in a review, contributor Eve Barlow wrote that "Boys" is "deceptively simple-sounding and unfussy," and "a reminder that [Charli XCX is] one of the best at knowing how to have fun; her convivial bop sounds as effortless as something dreamed up between lunch and dinner." The track was placed on several magazines' best songs of the year lists.

=== Rankings ===
Publication	Year	Accolade	Rank	Ref.
Billboard	2017	Best Songs of 2017	35	
Clash	2022	Charli XCX: Her 17 Best Songs	—N/a	
Complex	2017	The Best Songs of 2017	42	
Consequence of Sound	2022	Charli XCX's 10 Best Songs	2	
Entertainment Weekly	2017	Best Songs of 2017	19	
Esquire	2017	50 Best Songs of 2017	—N/a	
The Fader	2017	The 101 Best Songs of 2017	54	
The Guardian	2017	The Top 100 Tracks of 2017	2	
The Line of Best Fit	2017	The Best Fifty Songs of 2017	2	
NME	2017	Best Songs of the Year 2017	2	
Noisey	2017	The 100 Best Songs of 2017	23	
Pitchfork	2017	The 100 Best Songs of 2017	10	
Pretty Much Amazing	2017	The Best Songs of 2017	18	
Rolling Stone	2017	50 Best Songs of 2017	23	

== Music video ==
The music video for "Boys" was released on 26 July 2017. It was directed by Charli XCX, with additional direction from Sarah McColgan, and began production in April 2017. It features a multitude of different celebrity cameos from figures within the music, fashion and social media industries. It was filmed in London and Los Angeles. In an interview with BBC Radio 1, Charli XCX said that the intention of the music video was to "flip the male gaze on its head".

=== List of boys in order of appearance ===
#	Boy/Boys	Occupation
1	Joe Jonas	Musician (Jonas Brothers, DNCE)
2	Josh Ostrovsky	Instagram celebrity
3	Max Hershenow	Musician (then-MS MR)
4	Charlie Puth	Musician
5	Joey Badass	Rapper
6	Oli Sykes	Musician (Bring Me the Horizon)
7	Cameron Dallas	Internet personality
8	Sage the Gemini	Rapper
9–10	Dave 1 and P-Thugg	Musicians (Chromeo)
11	Brendon Urie	Musician (then-Panic! at the Disco)
12	Caspar Lee	YouTuber
13	G-Eazy	Rapper
14	Stormzy	Rapper
15	Denzel Curry	Rapper
16	Aminé	Rapper
17–18	Ezra Koenig and Mark Ronson	Musician (Vampire Weekend) and DJ/record producer
19	MNEK	Singer-songwriter
20	Rostam Batmanglij	Musician (formerly of Vampire Weekend)
21	Bastian Schweinsteiger	Professional footballer
22	Dan Smith	Musician (Bastille)
23–24	Flume and A. G. Cook	Musicians
25–26	Wiz Khalifa and Ty Dolla Sign	Hip-hop musicians
27	Tinie Tempah	Rapper
28–30	Swet Shop Boys (Riz MC, Redinho, and Heems)	Hip hop group
31	Diplo	DJ & record producer
32–34	WSTRN (Akelle Charles, Haile, and Louis Rei)	Hip hop group
35	Takahiro Moriuchi	Musician (One Ok Rock)
36	Carl Barât	Musician (the Libertines)
37	Barns Courtney	Singer-songwriter
38	Connor Franta	YouTuber
39	Shaun Ross	Model
40	Fai Khadra	Singer
41	Mac DeMarco	Singer-songwriter
42	will.i.am	Musician (Black Eyed Peas)
43	Tommy Cash	Rapper
44	Jack Guinness	Model
45	Laurie Vincent	Musician (Soft Play, then-known as Slaves)
46	Jack Antonoff	Musician (Bleachers) and record producer
47–48	Tristan Evans and James McVey	Musicians (the Vamps)
49	Tom Daley	Diver
50	Frank Carter	Musician (then-Frank Carter and the Rattlesnakes)
51	Mark Hunter	Photographer
52	Fred Macpherson	Musician (Spector)
53–57	Mic Lowry (Delleile Ankrah, Akia Jones, Kaine Ofoeme, Ben Sharples and Michael Welch)	Vocal harmony boy band
58–59	They (Dante Jones and Drew Love)	R&B duo
60	Theo Hutchcraft	Musician (Hurts)
61	Buddy	Rapper
62	John Gourley	Musician (Portugal. The Man)
63	Shokichi	Singer (Exile and the Second)
64	Liam Fray	Musician (Courteeners)
65	Jay Park	Singer and rapper (2PM), breakdancer (Art of Movement)
66–67	Prince Chenoa and Jacob Dekat	Founders, creative directors and photographers for Galore
68	DRAM	Rapper
69	Shamari Maurice	Instagram celebrity
70	Tom Grennan	Singer-songwriter
71	Jay Prince	Singer
72	Khalid	Singer
73	Poet	Presenter, podcaster and rapper
74	Vance Joy	Singer-songwriter
75	Kaytranada	DJ and record producer

== Track listing ==
- Digital download
1. "Boys" – 2:42
- Digital download
1. "Boys" (Acoustic) – 2:55
- Digital download
1. "Boys" (Coldabank Remix) – 3:56
- Digital download
1. "Boys" (Droeloe Remix) – 3:36
- Digital download
1. "Boys" (Nevada Remix) – 3:08
- Digital Download — Remix EP
1. "Boys" (Droeloe Remix) – 3:36
2. "Boys" (Nevada Remix) – 3:08
3. "Boys" (Acoustic) – 2:55
4. "Boys" (Coldabank Remix) – 3:56
- Digital Download — Chinese version
1. "Boys" feat. Jeanie (Howie Lee Remix) – 2:43

== Credits and personnel ==
Taken from Tidal.

- Charli XCX – lead vocals
- Jerker Hansson – songwriting, production
- Cass Lowe – songwriting, production
- Emily Warren – songwriting
- Ingrid Andress – songwriting
- Michael Pollack – songwriting
- Ari Leff – songwriting

== Charts ==
Chart (2017)	Peak position
Australia (ARIA)	60
Belgium (Ultratip Bubbling Under Flanders)	16
Belgium (Ultratip Bubbling Under Wallonia)	4
Canada Hot 100 (Billboard)	60
Czech Republic Airplay (ČNS IFPI)	41
France (SNEP Sales Chart)	160
Ireland (IRMA)	55
Netherlands (Single Tip)	24
New Zealand Heatseekers (RMNZ)	1
Philippines (Philippine Hot 100)	41
Scottish Singles Sales (Official Charts)	26
Slovakia Airplay (ČNS IFPI)	60
Sweden Heatseeker (Sverigetopplistan)	17
UK Singles (Official Charts)	31
US Bubbling Under Hot 100 (Billboard)	10

== Certifications ==
Region	Certification	Certified units/sales
Canada (Music Canada)	Gold	40,000^{‡}
New Zealand (RMNZ)	Gold	15,000^{‡}
United Kingdom (BPI)	Silver	200,000^{‡}
United States (RIAA)	Gold	500,000^{‡}
^{‡} Sales+streaming figures based on certification alone.
