= Rabitt =

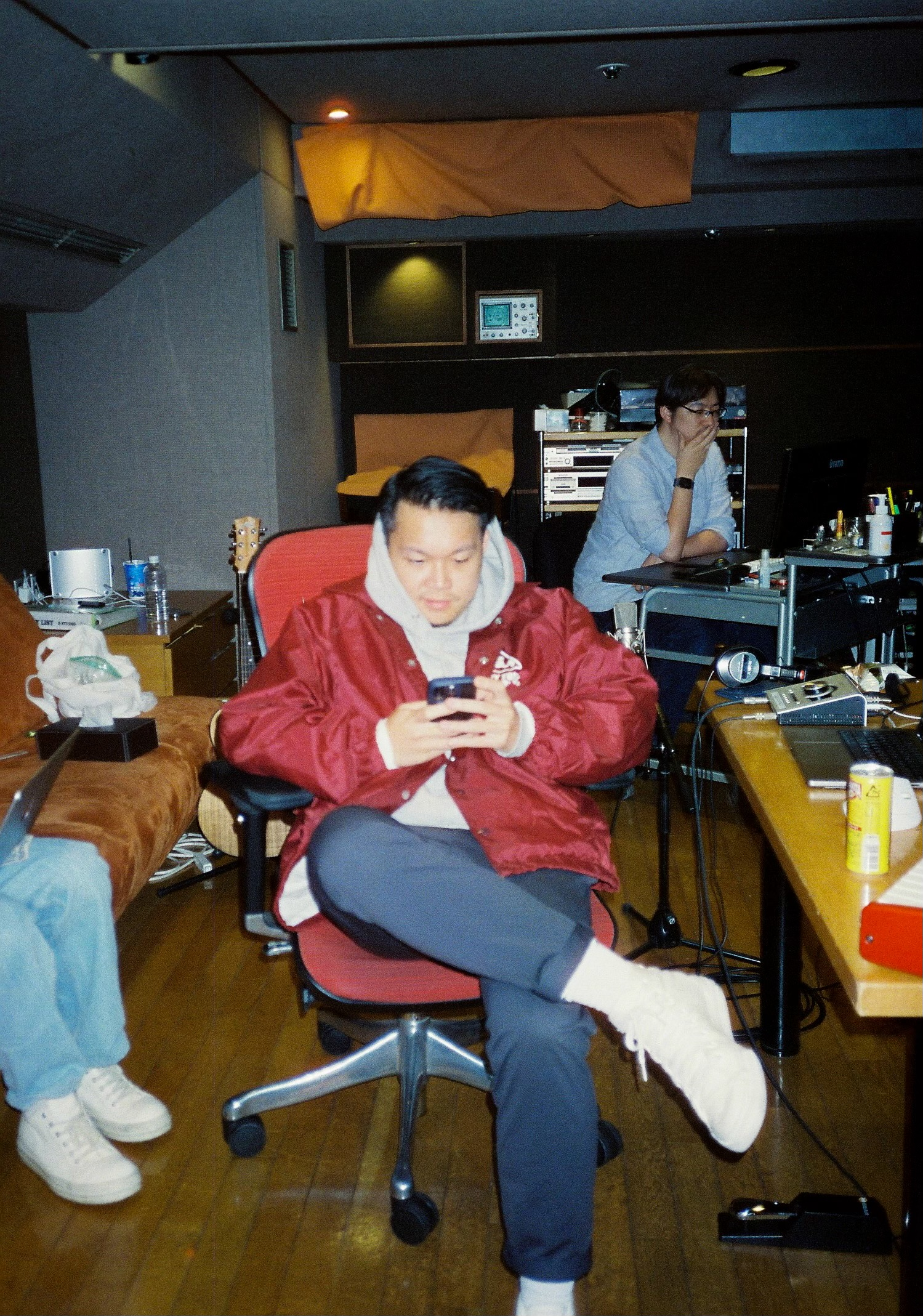

Background information
- Born: Yik Nam Jason Wu; August 2, 1993 (age 33); Hong Kong
- Genres: Pop; indie pop; alternative
- Occupations: Record producer; multi-instrumentalist; songwriter
- Instruments: Drums; keyboards; guitar; bass
- Years active: 2014−present
- Website: www.rabittbeats.com

Yik Nam Jason Wu (born August 2, 1993), known professionally as Rabitt, is a Grammy Award and Emmy Award nominated record producer and songwriter from Hong Kong, now based in Los Angeles, CA. Rabitt has produced and written songs for Andy Grammer, Anyma, Kiiara, Charlotte Lawrence, TEN , Dayoung, Ruby Rose Turner , VÉRITÉ, Álvaro Soler, Eric Nam, Ingrid Andress, and others.

== Early life and education ==
Wu was born and raised in Hong Kong. He started playing piano at the age of 5 and soon developed a passion for the drums. He then attended Berklee College of Music in 2011 and moved to Los Angeles, California shortly after graduation. It was at Berklee where he would meet the woman who would eventually sign him to her label, Kara DioGuardi, CEO of Arthouse Entertainment. DioGuardi is a visiting scholar with expertise in songwriting at Berklee.

Wu credits his parents' moral and financial support with allowing him to succeed in the music industry.

In 2014, Wu signed his first publishing deal with Universal Music Publishing and Arthouse Entertainment. The deal helped him obtain the visa necessary to stay in the United States after finishing school.

== Professional career ==
After connecting with DioGuardi, Wu collaborated with another of Arthouse Entertainment's artists, Claire Rachel Wilkinson, then going by the name Clairity. Wu's production was featured on her 2015 debut EP "Alienation".

Wu co-wrote and produced Andy Grammer's 2017 track "Freeze" off his album, The Good Parts. It was the last song Grammer wrote for the album, and he considered it a "little ode" to his days as a street performer singing "Sunday Morning" by Maroon 5. In 2019, Wu said hearing the song play in the Italian underwear store Calzedonia was the "proudest moment of his career".

In 2018, Wu co-wrote and produced an original composition titled "Perfume Smoke" for the soap opera General Hospital. The song was nominated for an Outstanding Original Song – Drama Emmy at the 45th Daytime Emmy Awards.

== Discography ==
Title	Year	Artist	Album	Writer	Producer or Co-Producer
"Exorcism"	2015	Clairity	Alienation	check	check
"The Warrior"	2015	Diego Boneta	Single	check	check
"Over You"	2015	Jebe & Petty	x Factor Indonesia		check
"Words Like Weapons"	2016	Clairity	Single	check	check
"Saint Lo"	2016	Megan Washington	Single	check	check
"Break Your Ways"	2016	Shaan	Single	check	check
"Break Your Waves"	2016	Uhre	UHRE	check	check
"Freeze"	2017	Andy Grammer	Good Parts	check	check
"Higher & Higher"	2017	Joe Ghost	Single	check	check
"Risky Love"	2017	Lime Cordiale	Permanent Vacation	check	check
"Lost"	2018	MOONZz	Aftershock	check	check
"Don't Call Me"	2018	Eric Nam	Honestly	check	check
"Stain"	2018	Colin Chase, Gill Chang, Miranda Glory	Single	check	
"Leave Me Alone"	2018	William Bolton	Anti Love Love Songs	check	check
"I Bet"	2018	Charlotte Lawrence	Young	check	check
"L*** Is A Bad Word"	2018	Kiiara	Single	check	check
"Loca"	2019	Alvaro Soler	Mar De Colores	check	
"On My Own"	2019	Trevor Moran	Single	check	check
"Lovers + Strangers"	2019	Starley	Single	check	
"Pushing All My Friends Away"	2019	Quinn Lewis	Single	check	check
"Hurt Me Now"	2019	Quinn Lewis	Single		check
"Empty"	2019	Quinn Lewis	Single		check
"One of Us"	2019	Quinn Lewis	Single	check	check
"Free"	2019	Sam Tsui	Trust	check	check
"Nowhere Fast"	2019	Valley	Maybe - Side B	check	
"First Time"	2019	Andy Grammer	Naïve	check	check
"She'd Say" featuring Ladysmith Black Mambazo	2019	Andy Grammer	Naïve	check	check
"Electric"	2019	Max and Harvey, Jayden Bartels	Single	check	check
"Ocean"	2019	VÉRITÉ	Single	check	check
"faded"	2019	VÉRITÉ	New Skin	check	check
"Sunflowers"	2019	Matthew Chaim	Mathematics of Nature	check	check
"Reason"	2019	Matthew Chaim	Mathematics of Nature	check	check
"Departed"	2019	Matthew Chaim	Mathematics of Nature	check	check
"Tender"	2019	Matthew Chaim	Mathematics of Nature	check	check
"Thoughts"	2019	Matthew Chaim	Mathematics of Nature	check	check
"Byways"	2019	Matthew Chaim	Mathematics of Nature	check	check
"Winter/Fall"	2019	Matthew Chaim	Mathematics of Nature	check	check
"Love Die Young"	2019	Eric Nam	Before We Begin	check	check
"Congratulations" featuring Marc E. Bassy	2019	Eric Nam	Before We Begin	check	check
"Come Through"	2019	Eric Nam	Before We Begin	check	check
"How'm I Doing"	2019	Eric Nam	Before We Begin	check	check
"You're Sexy I'm Sexy"	2019	Eric Nam	Before We Begin	check	check
"Egoist"	2020	Jenna Holiday	Single	check	check
"Great Advice"	2020	Hayley Gene Penner	Single	check	check
"Paradise"	2020	Eric Nam	The Other Side	check	check
"잘 지내지 (How You Been)"	2020	Eric Nam	The Other Side	check	check
"Down For You"	2020	Eric Nam	The Other Side	check	check
"Love Die Young (Korean Version)"	2020	Eric Nam	The Other Side	check	check
"Achilles Heart"	2020	Megan Washington	Batflowers	check	
"Batflowers"	2020	Megan Washington	Batflowers	check	check
"Bounce"	2020	King & Prince	L &	check	check
"Island"	2020	Matthew Chaim	Social Gathering by Gatsby Global	check	check
"Form"	2020	Matthew Chaim	Single	check	check
"Tear"	2020	Matthew Chaim	Single	check	check
"Life of the Party"	2020	Ingrid Andress	Lady Like	check	check
"Feeling Things"	2020	Ingrid Andress	Lady Like	check	
"Sin Again"	2020	Rotana	Single	check	check
"twenty something"	2020	sad alex	songs that you'll probably never hear pt. 2	check	check
"Lesson Zero"	2021	Epik High	Epik High is Here	check	check
"True Crime ft. Miso"	2021	Epik High	Epik High is Here	check	check
"Red Balloons"	2021	Matthew Chaim	Single	check	check
"Walk Backwards"	2021	Maude Latour	Single	check	check
"Confident"	2021	Kat Cunning	Single	check	check
"untitled"	2021	Jayde	sad songs about sad things		check
"Necessary Death"	2021	Rotana	Single	check	check
"One That Got Away"	2021	sad alex	Single	check	check
"Fuck Your Friends"	2021	Matluck	Single	check	check
"Bitch Don't Be Mad"	2021	Maeta	Habits	check	check
"Bitch Don't Be Mad Remix ft. Mura Masa & Nao"	2021	Maeta	Habits	check	check
"I Don't Know You Anymore"	2021	Eric Nam	There and Back Again	check	check
"Any Other Way"	2021	Eric Nam	There and Back Again	check	check
"Lost on Me"	2022	Eric Nam	There and Back Again	check	check
"Wildfire"	2022	Eric Nam	There and Back Again	check	check
"Admit"	2022	Eric Nam	There and Back Again	check	check
"What If"	2022	Eric Nam	There and Back Again	check	check
"One Way Lover"	2022	Eric Nam	There and Back Again	check	check
"Rich Kids Anthem ft. Lee Hi"	2022	Epik High	Epik High is Here	check	check
"Jake From State Farm"	2022	Salem Ilese	Unsponsored Content	check	check
"You Might Not Like Her"	2022	Maddie Zahm	Single	check	
"Uhuh Uhuh (Mama)"	2022	HARVEY	Single	check	check
"I'd Love To"	2023	Francis Karel	Crash & Burn	check	check
"Romantic Comedies"	2023	Francis Karel	Crash & Burn	check	check
"Enemy"	2023	eaJ	Single	check	check
"One (Me Trago Al Sol)"	2023	Songcamp, Kathleen Regan, Alan Lili, Rabitt	C4 Camp	check	check
"2x2"	2023	Kiki Riggs	Single	check	check
"Lovely Enough"	2023	Emily James	Single	check	check
"Heartbeat"	2023	Rowan Drake	Single	check	check
"July"	2023	Johnny Orlando	Single	check	check
"part of his world"	2023	sad alex	Single	check	check
"Salt"	2023	Matthew Chaim	NaCl	check	check
"NaCl"	2023	Rabitt, Matthew Chaim	NaCl	check	check
"Second to Last"	2023	Ryan Nealon	Single	check	check
"House on a Hill"	2023	Eric Nam	House on a Hill	check	check
"House on a Hill ft. Em Beihold"	2023	Eric Nam	House on a Hill	check	check
"Don't Leave Yet"	2023	Eric Nam	House on a Hill	check	check
"undefined"	2023	Eric Nam	House on a Hill	check	check
"Sink or Swim"	2023	Eric Nam	House on a Hill	check	check
"Exist"	2023	Eric Nam	House on a Hill	check	check
"The Maze"	2023	J. Maya	Single	check	check
"Hellbent"	2023	J. Maya	Single	check	check
"Pictures of You"	2024	Anyma	Single	check	
"Here I Am"	2024	Rotana	Single		check
"Us"	2024	Rotana	Single	check	check
"the end"	2024	Shoffy, Emilia Ali	Single	check	check
"In My Mind ft. Zak Abel"	2024	Eric Nam	House on a Hill Deluxe Album	check	check
"Strawberries"	2024	Eric Nam	House on a Hill Deluxe Album	check	check
"Wish I Didn't Care ft. Lyn Lapid"	2024	Eric Nam	House on a Hill Deluxe Album	check	check
"jekyll and hyde"	2024	sad alex	Single	check	check
"holiday"	2024	Jax	Dear Joe,	check	check
"I'm Good"	2024	Emily James	The aLtErNaTeS, Pt. 2	check	check
"Classic"	2024	Stell	Room	check	check
"Everywhere I Go"	2024	Novelbright, Eric Nam	Single	check	check
"love on the run"	2024	Yorke	Single	check	check
"Like Me Back"	2024	Ryan Nealon	Single	check	check
"The Siege"	2024	J. Maya	The Rest of the Laurels	check	check
"Nike"	2024	J. Maya	The Rest of the Laurels	check	check
"Closure"	2024	Bava	Single	check	check
"Without You"	2024	Bava	Single	check	check
"Veins"	2025	Koastle	In The Beginning	check	
"Country Lullaby"	2025	Lewis Love	Lovesick	check	check
"Your Body Now"	2025	Hayley Gene Penner	Clumps	check	check
"Like Me"	2025	Hayley Gene Penner	Clumps	check	check
"number one rockstar"	2025	Dayoung	gonna love me, right	check	check
"Marry Me"	2025	Dayoung	gonna love me, right	check	check
"Boys Boys Boys"	2025	Tedy	Scandalous	check	check
"Hurt My Feelings"	2025	Tedy	Scandalous	check	check
"Read Your Mind"	2026	Emyrson Flora	Arn't You Curious	check	check
"Curious"	2026	Emyrson Flora	Arn't You Curious	check	check
"CHILLS"	2026	AEN	A New Era of Now	check	check
"What's a girl to do"	2026	Dayoung	Single	check	check
"FLIRTY ft. Jay Park"	2026	Dayoung	Single	check	check
"young & american"	2026	Bava	luckiest girl!	check	check
"easier said than done"	2026	Bava	luckiest girl!	check	check
"this apartment"	2026	Bava	luckiest girl!	check	check
"lucky girl"	2026	Bava	luckiest girl!	check	check
"OUTWEST"	2026	TEN	Single	check	check
"How the Fire Started"	2026	Eric Nam	Confessions of a Lonely Heart	check	check
"Miss Me More"	2026	Eric Nam	Confessions of a Lonely Heart	check	check
"Sober Up"	2026	Eric Nam	Confessions of a Lonely Heart	check	check
"Lighthouse"	2026	Eric Nam	Confessions of a Lonely Heart	check	check
"Make Me Cry"	2026	Eric Nam	Confessions of a Lonely Heart	check	check
"Half As Much"	2026	Eric Nam	Confessions of a Lonely Heart	check	check
"Love Me Hard"	2026	Paul Kim	Single	check	check
"Vanity"	2026	Ruby Rose Turner	Single	check	check
"Clementine"	2026	Ruby Rose Turner	Single	check	check
"Digital Girlfriend"	2026	Ruby Rose Turner	Single	check	check

== Awards and nominations ==
- Emmy Awards
  - 2016: Outstanding Original Song – Drama – "Perfume Smoke" – ABC's, General Hospital (Nominated)
- Grammy Awards
  - 2021: Best Country Album – "Lady Like" – Ingrid Andress (Nominated)
