= Jack Guinness =

British writer, model, and presenter (born 1982)

Jack Guinness (born 1982) is a British writer, model, and presenter. He is the founder and director of The Queer Bible. Guinness began his career as a model, starring in global campaigns for brands such as L'Oreal, Dunhill and Dolce & Gabbana.

== Biography ==
Guinness was born in Lambeth and is a member of the Guinness family. He characterised the family as being divided into "the brewing side, the banking side who got into trouble in the 1980s, then there's the religious side", with Guinness's own father, grandfather and great-grandfather all being vicars.

He lived in Lambeth until his family moved to Belgravia when he was ten years old. He studied at Cambridge University.

He began his career as a fashion model and was featured in advertisement campaigns for L'Oreal, Dunhill, and Dolce & Gabbana. Guinness is represented by Elite London. He later began working as a style and fashion commentator and was a contributor to The Sunday Times, Italian Vogue, The Guardian, British GQ, Tatler, and Gentleman's Journal.

He is the founder of The Queer Bible, an LGBTQIA website that brings awareness to the work and lives of LGBTQ people around the world and teaches LGBTQIA history.

Guinness is gay.
