= Ingrid Andress =

American country singer (born 1991)

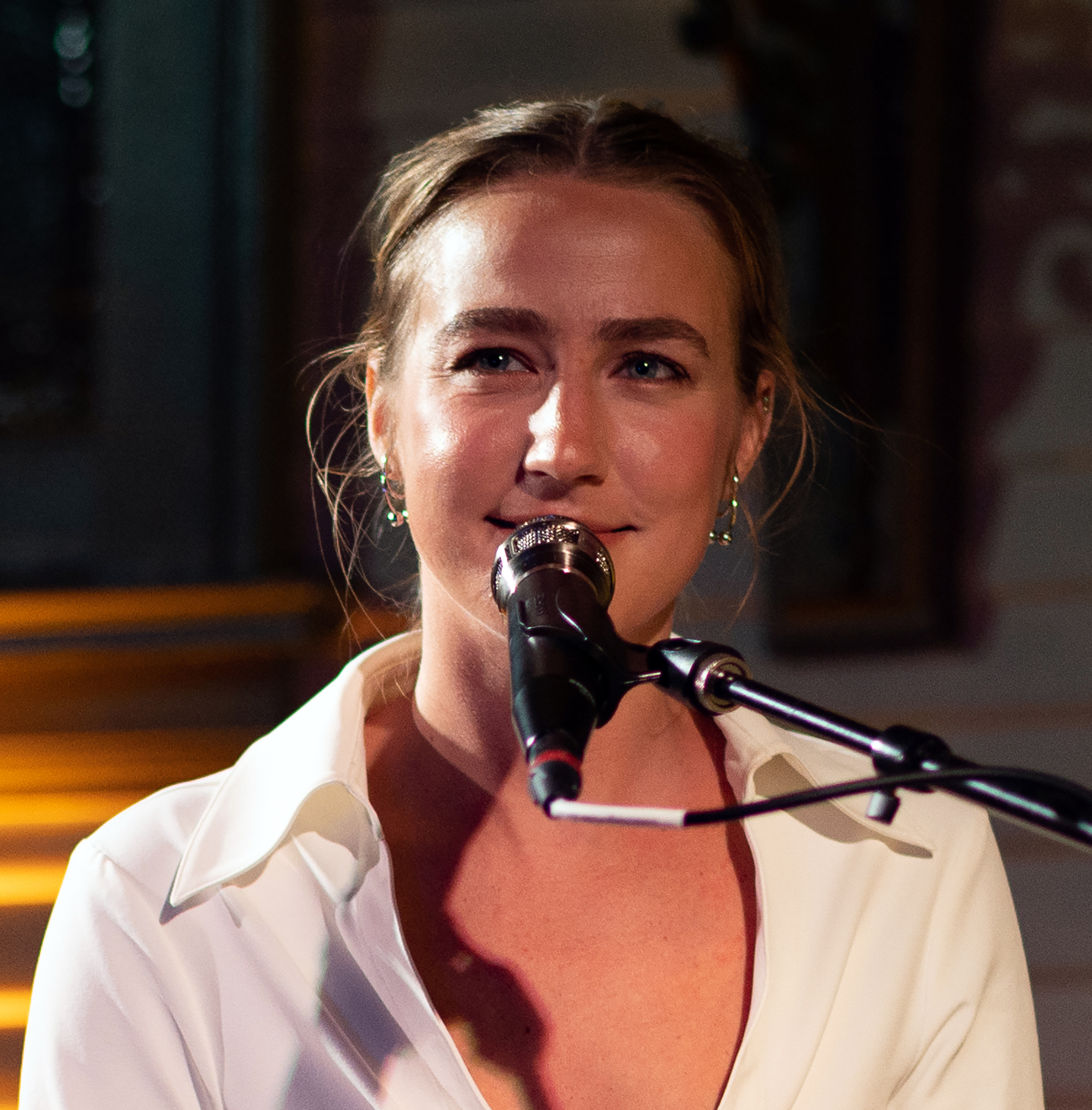
- Andress in 2022

Background information
- Born: Ingrid Elizabeth Andress; September 21, 1991 (age 35); Southfield, Michigan, U.S.
- Genres: Country; country pop
- Occupations: Singer; songwriter
- Instruments: Vocals; piano
- Years active: 2014–present
- Labels: Atlantic; Warner Nashville
- Website: ingridandress.com

Ingrid Elizabeth Andress (born September 21, 1991) is an American country pop singer-songwriter. She has released two albums: Lady Like (2020) and Good Person (2022). She has achieved commercial success with "More Hearts Than Mine" (2019), which peaked at number 30 on the Billboard Hot 100; "The Stranger" (2017 & 2020), which peaked at number 49 on Country Airplay; "Wishful Drinking" (2021), which peaked at number 47 on the Billboard Hot 100; and "Feel Like This" (2023), which peaked at number 60 on Country Airplay. She has also cowritten songs recorded by other artists including "Boys" (2017) by Charli XCX.

== Early life ==
Andress was born in Southfield, Michigan, and grew up in Highlands Ranch, Colorado. She is the second of five children and has three sisters and a brother. She grew up in a sheltered and strict Christian household and was mostly homeschooled until high school. Her father, Brad Andress, is a former major league strength and conditioning coach who worked for the Detroit Tigers, Colorado Rockies, and New York Mets. Beginning at age 6, influenced by her mother, she learned to play piano and drums. In middle school, she frequently listened to Coldplay and Evanescence and she started a heavy metal music band. In 2009, she graduated from Rock Canyon High School, where she participated in high school choir competitions.

== Career ==
=== Education and early career ===
Andress attended Berklee College of Music and majored in songwriting and performance. She joined a cappella group Pitch Slapped and performed on the NBC singing competition The Sing-Off. Andress later joined the group Delilah and placed sixth. After leaving the show, Andress finished her degree in 2013 and underwent mentorship with her former teacher at Berklee and pop songwriter Kara DioGuardi. She then moved to Nashville, Tennessee, and signed a publishing deal with Sea Gayle Music and Arthouse Entertainment in 2014. From there, she began co-writing songs for other artists: "Boys" (2017), recorded by Charli XCX; "In Too Deep", recorded by Why Don't We, "Conflicted" (2018) recorded by Halestorm; "Girl in the Mirror" (2019) recorded by Bebe Rexha; and several songs on the No Saint (2019) album by Lauren Jenkins.

Andress then decided that her songs were too personal to have someone else sing them.

In 2017, she self-released "The Stranger", via her label, What Is an Ingrid, and published by Kara DioGuardi's Arthouse Entertainment. The song received airplay on satellite radio. She signed a talent management agreement with Blythe Scokin. In July 2018, Andress signed a recording contract with Warner Nashville and Atlantic Records.

=== 2019–2020: Lady Like ===
In February 2019, her first song with the label, "Lady Like", was released to digital platforms. In April 2019, she released the single "More Hearts Than Mine", which reached the top five of the American and Canadian country airplay charts. In March 2020, she released her debut studio album Lady Like through Warner Music Nashville; it reached No. 9 on the Top Country Albums chart. The album became one of Billboard's Top 10 Best Country Albums of the year and set the record as the highest streaming country female debut album of all time. In April 2020, Andress reached No. 1 on the Billboard Emerging Artists chart.

In July 2020, she re-released "The Stranger", which peaked at No. 49 on Country Airplay. The deluxe edition of Lady Like was released in October 2020. At the 63rd Annual Grammy Awards, Andress received three Grammy Awards nominations: Best Country Song for "More Hearts Than Mine", Best Country Album for Lady Like, and Best New Artist; these nominations made her the only country artist in a "Big Four" category.

=== 2021–present: Good Person ===
In August 2021, Andress released "Wishful Drinking" in collaboration with Sam Hunt. The song peaked at number 4 on Country Airplay. "Wishful Drinking" earned Andress her 4th Grammy Award nomination, for Best Country Duo/Group Performance, at the 65th annual ceremony.

"Seeing Someone Else", released in May 2022, was her first cross-format single. It peaked in the top 25 on the Adult Pop Airplay chart.

The album Good Person was released in August 2022. It charted on both the Billboard 200 and the Top Country Albums chart. Included on the album was "Feel Like This", which reached number 60 on the Country Airplay charts.

== Artistry and influences ==
Andress has cited the Chicks, John Denver, and Amy Grant as influences.

Andress has a vocal range of F3 - C5 (1.6 octaves).

== Personal life ==
Andress resides in Nashville, Tennessee.

In 2020, during the COVID-19 pandemic, Andress broke up with her boyfriend of six years and entered a new relationship. In 2023, she parted ways with her longtime manager and her live-in boyfriend, who had marriage expectations. After the breakups, Andress was "drinking more than she ever had in her life".

In July 2024, Andress performed "The Star-Spangled Banner" at the 2024 Major League Baseball Home Run Derby; the performance was widely criticized. The following day, Andress said that she was intoxicated during the performance; she spent a month at a rehab center in Utah, where she said she cried every day. In February 2025, Andress performed another rendition of the song in her home state at a Colorado Avalanche game; this version drew better responses.

== Discography ==
=== Studio albums ===
List of studio albums, with selected chart positions
Title	Details	Peak chart positions	
Title	Details	US	US Country
Lady Like	Release date: March 27, 2020; Label: Warner Music Nashville; Format: CD, digital download, streaming	90	9
Good Person	Release date: August 26, 2022; Label: Warner Music Nashville; Format: CD, digital download, streaming	173	18

=== Extended plays ===
List of extended plays
Title	EP details
The Rosebank Acoustic Sessions	Release date: September 16, 2019; Label: Warner Music Nashville; Format: Digital download, streaming
Spotify Singles	Release date: September 9, 2020; Label: Warner Music Nashville; Format: Digital download, streaming
The Last Day They Were on the Same Page Was in a Yearbook	Release date: August 25, 2023; Label: Warner Music Nashville; Format: Digital download, streaming

=== Singles ===
==== As lead artist ====
List of singles, with selected chart positions, and certifications
Title	Year	Peak chart positions						Certifications	Album
Title	Year	US	US Country Songs	US Country Airplay	US Adult Pop	CAN	CAN Country	Certifications	Album
"More Hearts Than Mine"	2019	30	5	3	—	55	4	RIAA: 2× Platinum; MC: 2× Platinum	Lady Like
"The Stranger"	2020	—	49	54	—	—	—		Lady Like
"Lady Like"	2020	—	39	33	—	—	—	RIAA: Gold; MC: Gold	Lady Like
"Wishful Drinking" (with Sam Hunt)	2021	47	11	4	—	—	8	RIAA: Platinum; MC: Gold	Good Person
"Seeing Someone Else"	2022	—	—	—	24	—	—		Good Person
"Feel Like This"	2023	—	—	60	—	—	—		Good Person
"—" denotes a recording that did not chart or was not released in that territory.

==== As featured artist ====
List of singles as featured artist
Title	Year	Album
"Bed on Fire" (Teddy Swims featuring Ingrid Andress)	2021	Non-album singles
"Good as Gone" (Marc Scibilia featuring Ingrid Andress)	2024	Non-album singles

==== Promotional singles ====
List of promotional singles
Title	Year	Album
"Deck the Halls (Holidays Are Here)" (with Eric Arjes)	2016	Non-album promotional single
"Anything but Love"	2017	Lady Like
"Demons Too"	2018	Non-album promotional single
"Both"	2019	Lady Like
"We're Not Friends"	2019	Lady Like
"Life of the Party"	2020	Lady Like
"Waste of Lime" (Note: "Waste of Lime" is only included on the deluxe version of Lady Like.)	2020	Lady Like
"On the Road Again" (Willie Nelson featuring ACM Awards New Artist Nominees)	2020	Non-album promotional singles
"Christmas Always Finds Me"	2020	Non-album promotional singles
"Good Person"	2022	Good Person
"Pain"	2022	Good Person
"Blue"	2022	Good Person
"Treated Me Good" (Note: "Treated Me Good" is only included on the deluxe version of Good Person.)	2023	Good Person
"On Fire" (Note: "On Fire" is only included on the deluxe version of The Beautiful Letdown (Our Version).)	2023	The Beautiful Letdown (Our Version)
"Once a Year"	2023	Non-album promotional single
"Footprints"	2025	TBA
"Catch 22"	2025	TBA

==== Guest appearances ====
List of guest appearances
Title	Year	Album
"Here for It" (Breland featuring Ingrid Andress)	2022	Cross Country
"Any Day Now" (Zac Brown Band featuring Ingrid Andress)	2022	The Comeback

=== Music videos ===
List of music videos
Title	Year	Director
"The Stranger"	2017	Lauren Jenkins
"Lady Like"	2019	Emma Higgins
"More Hearts Than Mine"	2019	Sam Siske
"The Stranger"	2020	Emma Higgins
"Waste of Lime"	2020	Lauren Dunn
"Lady Like"	2021	Lauren Dunn
"Wishful Drinking" (with Sam Hunt)	2021	Sam Siske

=== Songwriting credits ===
List of songs co-written for other artists
Title	Year	Artist(s)	Album
"Truly Outrageous"	2015	Bean	Truly Outrageous: A Tribute to Starlight Records
"Steady 1234"	2016	Vice featuring Jasmine Thompson and Skizzy Mars	Non-album singles
"Boys"	2017	Charli XCX	Non-album singles
"Footprints"	2017	Molly Kate Kestner	Non-album singles
"Conflicted"	2018	Halestorm	Vicious
"Gimme a Break"	2018	Nicole Millar	Excuse Me
"On Rewind"	2018	Nicole Millar	Excuse Me
"In Too Deep"	2018	Why Don't We	8 Letters
"Lose You"	2018	Eric Nam	Honestly
"Lost at Sea"	2018	Matoma	One in a Million
"Perf"	2018	Baby Ariel	Non-album single
"About You"	2019	Fletcher	You Ruined New York City for Me
"Clean"	2019	Hey Violet	Non-album single
"Girl in the Mirror"	2019	Bebe Rexha	UglyDolls
"Love Me or Leave Me Alone"	2019	Beachwood	Non-album single
"No Saint"	2019	Lauren Jenkins	No Saint
"Payday"	2019	Lauren Jenkins	No Saint
"Running out of Road"	2019	Lauren Jenkins	No Saint
"Above the Water"	2020	TRXD featuring Angelina Jordan	Non-album single
"Invisible Chains"	2020	Lauren Jauregui	Birds of Prey
"This Is Not Forever"	2020	Kate Miller-Heidke	Child in Reverse
"Happy for You"	2021	Jasmine Thompson	Non-album singles
"Hey Buster"	2021	Joey Moe	Non-album singles
"I Didn't Lie"	2021	LANY	Gg bb xx
"Overdrive"	2021	Louis Baker featuring Kings	Love Levitates
"I Think I'm Growing?"	2022	Fletcher	Girl of My Dreams
"Same Stars"	2022	Alli Walker	Growing Up
"175 Lbs"	2023	Wé Ani	Non-album single

== Awards and nominations ==
Ingrid Andress' awards and nominations
Organization	Year	Nominated work	Category	Result	Ref.
Academy of Country Music Awards	2020	Ingrid Andress	New Female Artist of the Year	Nominated	
Academy of Country Music Awards	2021	Ingrid Andress	New Female Artist of the Year	Nominated	
Academy of Country Music Awards	2021	"More Hearts Than Mine"	Single of the Year	Nominated	
BMI Country Awards	2020	"More Hearts Than Mine"	Most-Performed Songs of the Year	Won	
BMI Country Awards	2023	"Wishful Drinking"	Most-Performed Songs of the Year	Won	
CMT Music Awards	2020	"More Hearts Than Mine"	Breakthrough Video of the Year	Nominated	
CMT Music Awards	2023	"Wishful Drinking"	Collaborative Video of the Year	Nominated	
CMT Music Awards	2023	"Wishful Drinking"	CMT Digital-First Performance of the Year	Nominated	
Contemporary A Cappella Recording Awards	2011	"Joy to the World"	Best Mixed Collegiate Solo	Runner-up (Note: Shared with Mario Jose, Hannah Juliano, and Jennifer Waris.)	
Country Music Association Awards	2020	Ingrid Andress	New Artist of the Year	Nominated	
Country Music Association Awards	2020	"More Hearts Than Mine"	Song of the Year	Nominated	
Country Music Association Awards	2021	Ingrid Andress	New Artist of the Year	Nominated	
Grammy Awards	2021	Ingrid Andress	Best New Artist	Nominated	
Grammy Awards	2021	"More Hearts Than Mine"	Best Country Song	Nominated	
Grammy Awards	2021	Lady Like	Best Country Album	Nominated	
Grammy Awards	2023	"Wishful Drinking"	Best Country Duo/Group Performance	Nominated	
MusicRow Awards	2020	Ingrid Andress	Breakthrough Artist of the Year	Won	
MusicRow Awards	2020	Ingrid Andress	Breakthrough Artist-Writer of the Year	Won	
MusicRow Awards	2020	"More Hearts Than Mine"	Song of the Year	Won	
Nashville Songwriter Awards	2020	"More Hearts Than Mine"	Song of the Year	Won	
People's Choice Country Awards	2023	Ingrid Andress	The New Artist of 2023	Nominated	
Robert Awards	2022	"Hey Buster"	Best Song	Nominated	

== Tours ==
=== Headlining ===
- The Lady Like Tour (2019)
- Feeling Things Tour (2021) (Note: The European leg of the tour, which would have run throughout 2022, was canceled.)
- The Good Person Tour (2023)

=== Opening act ===
- Dan + Shay – The (Arena) Tour (2021)
- Keith Urban – The Speed of Now World Tour (2022)
- Walker Hayes – Duck Buck Tour (2023)
- Stevie Nicks – Live in Concert Tour (2023)
