= YouTube Space =

Facilities for creating YouTube content

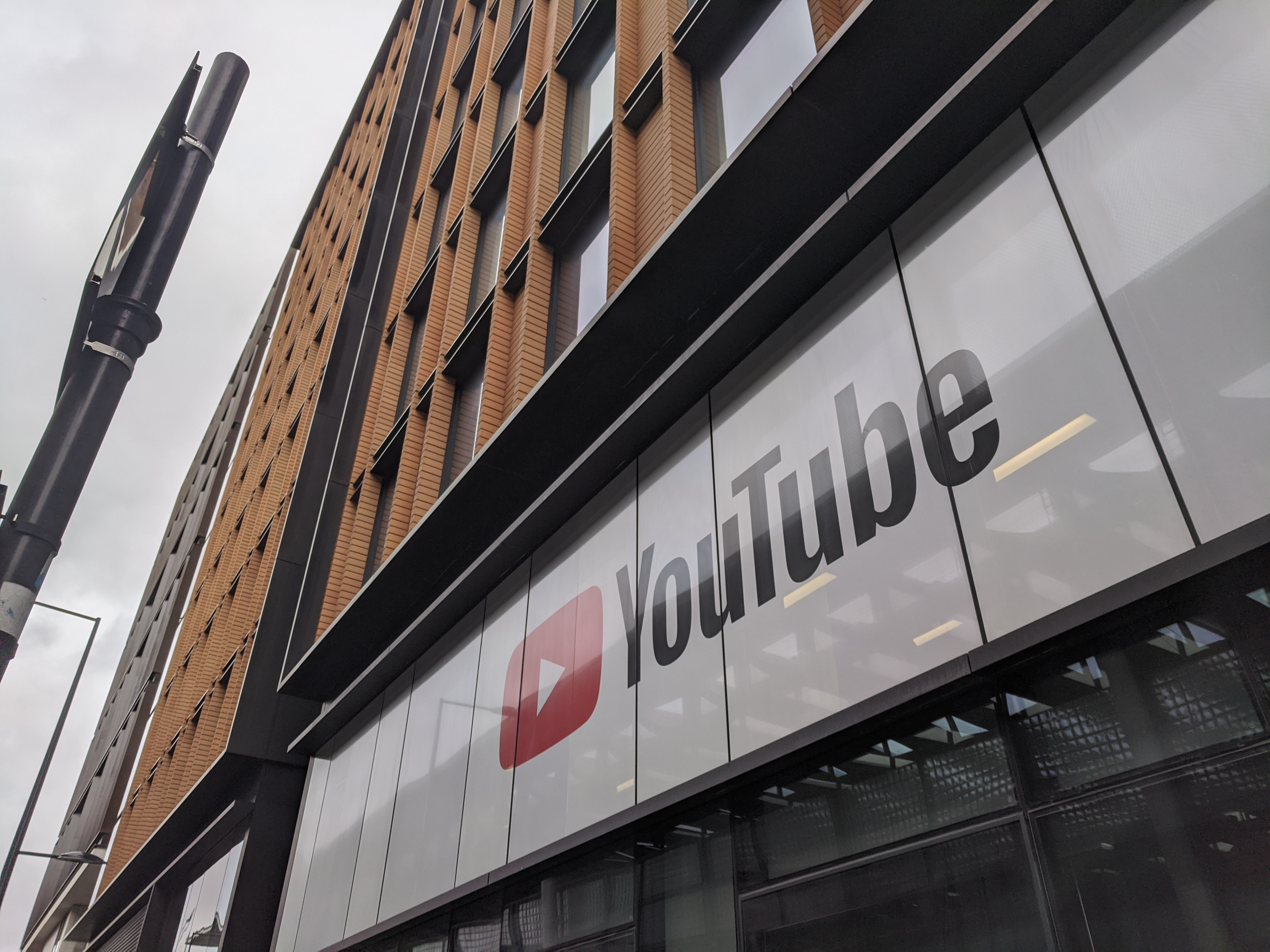
The exterior of YouTube Space London Kings Cross in 2020, the first YouTube Space to be opened in 2012

A YouTube Space is the name given to virtual and pop-up events designed to aid content creators hosted by the American video hosting platform YouTube.

Originally, YouTube Spaces were physical locations provided by YouTube for content creators to learn about producing content as well as providing them with facilities to create content for their YouTube channels. For eligible content creators, YouTube Spaces were completely free to use and including the use of equipment, studio space, postproduction facilities, trainings and workshops provided by YouTube. There were ten physical YouTube Spaces around the world. The first YouTube space was opened at Google's London Kings Cross offices in 2012. These physical locations closed temporarily 2020 due to the COVID-19 pandemic, however, on February 18, 2021, YouTube chief business officer Robert Kyncl announced that the physical YouTube spaces in Berlin, London, Los Angeles, New York, Paris, Rio de Janeiro, and Tokyo would remain closed permanently. Physical YouTube spaces remain open in São Paulo, Mumbai, and Dubai.

== Locations ==
=== London ===
YouTube's first space was opened in London Tottenham Court Road in 2012. It included three soundproof studios, editing suites, and a store for YouTubers to sell their merchandise. It also had a community area with a coffee bar.

=== Los Angeles ===
LA was the second location to have a YouTube space and opened up in 2013. It was located minutes away from Los Angeles International Airport.

=== Tokyo ===
Tokyo's YouTube space opened in 2013. It included a traditional Japanese home set, a classroom set, and a modular set that functions for game shows. Located in Roppongi Hills, the facility also boasted a training room and recording studio for creators.

=== New York ===
New York's YouTube space opened up in 2014 and was the fourth Global YouTube Space and second one based in the US. The 20,000 square-foot space opened on the sixth floor of New York's Chelsea Market.

=== São Paulo ===
Brazil's first YouTube space opened in 2014.

=== Rio de Janeiro ===
Brazil's second YouTube space opened in 2015. It featured 22000 square feet of space.

=== Berlin ===
Berlin's YouTube space opened in 2015. YouTube partnered with MET Film School for a Berlin campus. For creators to get in and start shooting, they only needed 1,000 subscribers, making it a much more easily accessible space than many of the other offerings.

=== Paris ===
The Paris space was opened in 2015.

=== Mumbai ===
Mumbai Space was opened in 2016. It boasts 1400 square foot space within Whistling Woods International (WWI) sprawling production complex, which includes a 400 square foot studio, a lounge and workshop space for creators to relax and socialize in, and an edit bay with two machines that are capable of 4K editing.

=== Dubai ===
The Dubai Space opened up in 2018, becoming the tenth global YouTube Space. Like other studios, it features a fully equipped studio and post-production and community support for creator's content, in partnership with YouTube.

=== Toronto ===
The Toronto space at George Brown College opened on April 26, 2017, and closed in May 2019.
