= Sam Ellis (songwriter) =

Canadian songwriter and record producer (born 1987)

- Born: Sam Mackenzie Ellis; September 19, 1987 (age 38); Hespeler, Ontario, Canada
- Genres: Pop; country
- Occupations: Musician; songwriter; record producer
- Instruments: Vocals; guitar; mandolin; synthesizer; keyboard
- Years active: 2011–present
- Label: Universal Music Publishing Group (2012–present)

Sam Mackenzie Ellis (born September 19, 1987) is a Canadian songwriter and record producer based in Nashville, Tennessee.

== Biography ==
In 2012, Ellis signed to Universal Music Publishing Group. He co-wrote Martina McBride's single "Just Around the Corner" which became the official anthem for the 'Band Against Cancer: The Sarah Cannan Tour'. "Somewhere In the Country", co-written and produced with Canadian country music artist Tebey, peaked at #11 on the Canadian Radio Airplay chart and was the most played Canadian country song on country radio in 2012. His songwriting credits also include cuts with Thomas Rhett, Jacob Sartorius, Hearts & Colors, Hunter Hayes, Kane Brown, and Martina McBride.

== Songwriting credits ==
Songs written or co-written by Sam Ellis.

Discography
Artist	Album	Song
Dallas Smith	TBA	"Good Time Goes"
Ingrid Andress	Single (2020)	"Waste of Lime"
Ingrid Andress	Single (2019)	"Lady Like"
Ingrid Andress	Single (2019)	"More Hearts Than Mine"
Lady A	Single (2019)	"What If I Never Get Over You"
Lady A	Single (2019)	"What I'm Leaving For"
Carly Pearce	Single (2019)	"It Won't Always Be Like This"
Danielle Bradbery	I Don't Believe We've Met (2017)	"What Are We Doing"
Thomas Rhett	Life Changes (Thomas Rhett album) (2017)	"Gateway Love"
Jacob Sartorius	Left Me Hangin' EP (2017)	"Chapstick"
Andrelli	Single Feat. Elle Winter (2017)	"Always You"
Rachel Wammack	Enough (album) (2019)	"Enough"
Hunter Hayes	Single (2017)	"You Should Be Loved"
Hunter Hayes	Hunter Hayes (album) (2011)	"All You Ever"
Hunter Hayes	Hunter Hayes (album) Encore Edition (2012)	"In A Song"
Hunter Hayes	Storyline (Hunter Hayes album) (2014)	"You Think You Know Somebody"
Hunter Hayes	Storyline (Hunter Hayes album) (2014)	"When Did You Stop Loving Me"
Hunter Hayes	Storyline (Hunter Hayes album) (2014)	"...Like I Was Saying (jam)"
Hunter Hayes	Storyline (Hunter Hayes album) (2014)	"Secret Love"
Hunter Hayes	Storyline (Hunter Hayes album) (2014)	"Love Too Much"
Tebey	The Wait (Tebey album) (2012)	"Somewhere In the Country"
Tebey	Old School (EP) (2016)	"Lightweight"
Tebey	Single (2018)	"Show You What It's Like"
Kane Brown	Kane Brown (album) (2016)	"Learning"
Kane Brown	Kane Brown (album) (2016)	"What's Mine Is Yours"
Kane Brown	Experiment (album) (2018)	"Live Forever"
Kane Brown	Experiment (album) (2018)	"American Bad Dream"
Kane Brown	Experiment (album) (2018)	"Work"
Martina McBride	Reckless (Martina McBride album) (2016)	"Just Around the Corner"
Hearts & Colors	Prologue (2016)	"Lighthouse"
Hearts & Colors	Single (2018)	"LA On A Saturday Night"
Jordan Smith (musician)	Only Love (album) 2018	"Only Love"
Jordan Smith (musician)	Only Love (album) 2018	"Nothing On You"
Sondr Feat. Peg Parnevik	Single (2017)	"Live Love Learn"
Jess Moskaluke	Past the Past (2017)	"Past the Past"
Sid Rosco ft. Tillstrom	Single (2017)	"Under Your Skin"
Striking Matches	"Shameless - EP" (2017)	"Shameless"
Kira Isabella	Sides (album) (2019)	"Danger Danger"
Kira Isabella	Sides (album) (2019)	"Little Girl"
Kira Isabella	Sides (album) (2019)	"Handcuffs"
Kira Isabella	Sides (album) (2019)	"Stupid Heart"
Kira Isabella	Sides (album) (2019)	"We Should Be Together"
Kira Isabella	Sides (album) (2019)	"Holiday"
Kira Isabella	Sides (album) (2019)	"XGF"
Kira Isabella	Sides (album) (2019)	"Soon"
Kira Isabella	Sides (album) (2019)	"Sleep When We're Dead"
Sarahbeth Taite	Sarahbeth Taite (EP) (2016)	"Insane"
David Bisbal	Hijos Del Mar (2016)	"Una Palabra"
Kyle Reynolds	Single (2016)	"Hold You Tighter"
Kyle Reynolds	Single (2017)	"Friday Saturday Sunday"
Kyle Reynolds	Single Feat. Quilinez (2017)	"Moving Pieces"
Ashworth	Single (2017)	"Nobody In The World"
Lizzy McAvoy	Be Brave (2016)	"Waking Up in Paradise"
Leah Daniels	Leah Daniels (2011)	"Let Love Decide"
Leah Daniels	Leah Daniels (2011)	"One Night"
Leah Daniels	Leah Daniels (2011)	"Still"
Leah Daniels	Leah Daniels (2011)	"Everybody Wants to Be In Love"
Leah Daniels	Leah Daniels (2011)	"Where Do I Go"
Leah Daniels	Leah Daniels (2011)	"All That You Are"
Leah Daniels	What It Feels Like (2016)	"Go Back"
Leah Daniels	The Story (album) (2018)	"Flying"
Leah Daniels	The Story (album) (2018)	"Tell Me Right Now"
Leah Daniels	The Story (album) (2018)	"One More Round
Jordan McIntosh	Steal Your Heart (2016)	"Sunroof"
Jordan McIntosh	Steal Your Heart (2016)	"Turbulence"
Jessica Mitchell	Heart of Glass (album) (2018)	"Bulletproof"
Catherine McGrath	Talk of This Town (album) (2018)	"Enough For You"
Leaving Austin	Southern Gold (album) (2019)	"Nothing But You"
Demi Lovato	Holy Fvck (2022)	"Dead Friends"

== Production credits ==
Year	Artist	Song(s)/Album	Details
2007	Mandippal Jandu	When It's Only Me Standing	Producer
2011	Leah Daniels	"Let Love Decide"	Producer
2011	Leah Daniels	"One Night"	Producer
2011	Leah Daniels	"Still"	Producer
2011	Leah Daniels	"Everybody Wants to Be In Love"	Producer
2011	Leah Daniels	"Where Do I Go"	Producer
2011	Leah Daniels	"All That You Are"	Producer
2012	Tebey	"Somewhere In the Country"	Co-Producer w/ Tebey
2014	Hunter Hayes	"Dream Girl"	Co-Producer w/ Hunter Hayes
2015	Sarahbeth Taite	"Insane"	Producer
2016	Tebey	"Lightweight"	Co-Producer w/ Tebey
2016	Lizzy McAvoy	"Waking Up In Paradise"	Producer
2016	Kyle Reynolds	"Hold You Tighter"	Producer
2016	Sondr Feat. Peg Parnevik	"Live Love Learn"	Co-Producer
2017	Hunter Hayes	"You Should Be Loved"	Co-Producer w/ Hunter Hayes
2017	Kyle Reynolds	"Friday Saturday Sunday"	Producer
2017	Jacob Sartorius	"Chapstick"	Producer
2017	Danielle Bradbery	"What Are We Doing"	Producer
2017	Jesse Labelle	"Another You"	Producer
2017	Jesse Labelle	"Get Away With It"	Producer
2018	Leah Daniels	"Flying"	Producer
2018	Leah Daniels	"Tell Me Right Now"	Producer
2018	Leah Daniels	"One More Round"	Producer
2018	Tebey	"Show You What It's Like"	Producer
2018	Hearts & Colors	"LA on a Saturday Night"	Producer
2018	Catherine McGrath	"Enough For You"	Producer
2018	Josie Dunne	"Old School (Acoustic)"	Producer
2018	Josie Dunne	"Cool With It (Acoustic)"	Producer
2019	Leaving Austin	"Nothing But You"	Producer
2019	Hunter Hayes	"Heartbreak"	Co-Producer w/ Hunter Hayes
2019	Kira Isabella	"Danger Danger"	Producer
2019	Kira Isabella	"Little Girl"	Producer
2019	Kira Isabella	"Handcuffs"	Producer
2019	Kira Isabella	"Stupid Heart"	Producer
2019	Kira Isabella	"We Should Be Together"	Producer
2019	Kira Isabella	"Holiday"	Producer
2019	Kira Isabella	"XGF"	Producer
2019	Kira Isabella	"Soon"	Producer
2019	Kira Isabella	"Sleep When We're Dead"	Producer
2019	Ingrid Andress	"Lady Like"	Producer
2019	Ingrid Andress	"More Hearts Than Mine"	Producer
2019	Rachel Wammack	"Enough"	Producer
2022	Demi Lovato	"Dead Friends"	Writer

== Sync credits ==
Year	Company	Song title	Details
2018	Ram Trucks	"Farmer In All Of Us"	Writer
2018	Ram Trucks	"Farmer In All Of Us"	Producer
