= Ashley McBryde discography =

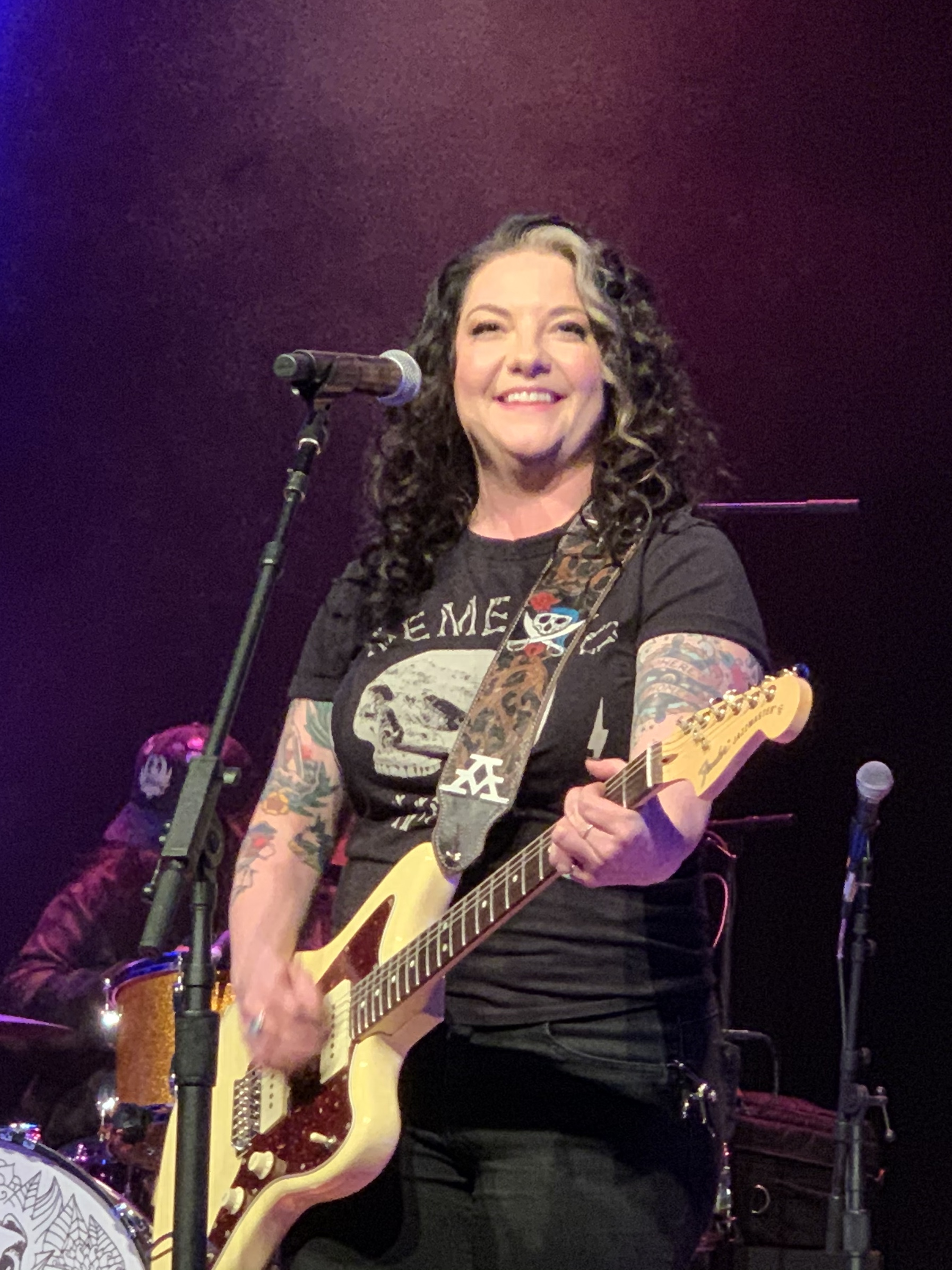
- Ashley McBryde performing in 2020
- Studio albums: 5
- EPs: 2
- Singles: 8
- Music videos: 8
- Promotional singles: 5
- Other charted songs: 1
- Demo albums: 2
- Other album appearances: 6

The discography of American country singer-songwriter Ashley McBryde contains five studio albums, two demo albums, two extended plays (EPs), seven singles, five promotional singles, one charting song, eight music videos and has appeared on four albums. In 2006 and 2011, McBryde self-released demo albums. She later signed with Warner Music Nashville and issued 2016's Jalopies & Expensive Guitars (EP). In 2017, McBryde's single titled "A Little Dive Bar in Dahlonega" reached the top 30 of the American country charts. It was followed her debut major-label studio album named Girl Going Nowhere (2018). The disc reached the top ten of the Billboard country albums list and the top 50 of the Billboard 200. The title track was later spawned as a single in 2019 and also reached the American country top 40.

In 2019, McBryde also released the single "One Night Standards". The song was her first to reach the top 20 of the Billboard Hot Country Songs and Country Airplay charts. It also was certified platinum in sales for over one million copies in the United States. The song was followed by the studio album titled Never Will, which reached the top five of the country albums chart and the top 60 of the Billboard 200. The disc also spawned the 2020 single "Martha Divine", which charted the Country Airplay chart in 2020. In 2021, a duet with Carly Pearce titled "Never Wanted to Be That Girl" was released as a single. Her third studio album, the concept album Lindeville, was released in September 2022.

== Albums ==
=== Studio albums ===
List of albums, with selected chart positions and sales, showing other relevant details
Title	Album details	Peak chart positions		Sales
Title	Album details	US	US Country	Sales
Girl Going Nowhere	Released: March 30, 2018; Label: Warner Music Nashville; Formats: CD, LP, digital	49	7	US: 44,700
Never Will	Released: April 3, 2020; Label: Warner Music Nashville; Formats: CD, LP, digital	54	5	
Lindeville	Released: September 30, 2022; Label: Warner Music Nashville; Formats: CD, LP, digital	— (Note: Lindeville did not enter the Billboard 200, but peaked at number 45 on the Billboard Top Album Sales chart.)	—	
The Devil I Know	Released: September 8, 2023; Label: Warner Music Nashville; Formats: CD, LP, digital	158	28	
Wild	Released: May 8, 2026; Label: Warner Music Nashville; Formats: CD, LP, digital	— (Note: Wild did not enter the Billboard 200, but peaked at number 21 on the Billboard Top Album Sales chart.)	—	
"—" denotes a recording that did not chart or was not released in that territory.

=== Demo albums ===
List of albums, showing relevant details
Title	Album details
Ashley McBryde	Released: January 2006; Label: Self-released; Formats: CD
Elsebound	Released: June 25, 2011; Label: Self-released; Formats: CD

== Extended plays ==
List of EPs, showing relevant details
Title	EP details
Jalopies & Expensive Guitars	Released: March 11, 2016; Label: Road Life; Formats: Digital
Never Will: Live from a Distance	Released: May 28, 2021; Label: Warner Music Nashville; Formats: Digital

== Singles ==
=== As lead artist ===
List of singles, with selected chart positions and certifications, showing other relevant details
Title	Year	Peak chart positions					Sales	Certifications	Album
Title	Year	US	US Cou. Songs	US Cou. Air.	CAN	CAN Cou.	Sales	Certifications	Album
"A Little Dive Bar in Dahlonega"	2017	—	30	30	—	45	US: 66,000	RIAA: Gold	Girl Going Nowhere
"Radioland"	2018	—	—	—	—	—			Girl Going Nowhere
"Girl Goin' Nowhere"	2019	—	—	40	—	—	US: 27,000		Girl Going Nowhere
"One Night Standards"	2019	76	17	11	72	1	US: 23,000	MC: Gold; RIAA: Platinum	Never Will
"Martha Divine"	2020	—	—	59	—	—			Never Will
"Light On in the Kitchen"	2023	— (Note: "Light On in the Kitchen" did not enter the Billboard Hot 100, but peaked at number 20 on the Bubbling Under Hot 100 Singles chart.)	45	22	—	34		RIAA: Gold	The Devil I Know
"The Devil I Know"	2024	—	—	60	—	—			The Devil I Know
"What If We Don't"	2026	—	—	32	—	48			Wild
"—" denotes a recording that did not chart or was not released in that territory.

=== As a featured artist ===
List of singles, with selected chart positions, showing other relevant details
Title	Year	Peak chart positions					Certifications	Album
Title	Year	US	US Cou. Songs	US Cou. Air.	CAN	CAN Cou.	Certifications	Album
"Never Wanted to Be That Girl" (Carly Pearce with Ashley McBryde)	2021	63	13	1	59	1	MC: Gold; RIAA: Gold	29: Written in Stone
"Terrible Things" (Halestorm featuring Ashley McBryde)	2023	—	—	—	—	—		Non-album single
"The Prophet (Grandaddy's Song)" (Jenna Paulette featuring Ashley McBryde)	2025	—	—	—	—	—		Horseback
"—" denotes a recording that did not chart or was not released in that territory.

=== Promotional singles ===
List of promotional singles, showing all relevant details
Title	Year	Album	Ref.
"Tired of Being Happy"	2017	Girl Going Nowhere	
"American Scandal"	2018	Girl Going Nowhere	
"Hang in There Girl"	2020	Never Will	
"First Thing I Reach For"	2020	Never Will	
"Sparrow"	2020	Never Will	
"Bonfire at Tina's" (featuring Caylee Hammack, Brandy Clark, and Pillbox Patti)	2022	Lindeville	
"Learned to Lie"	2023	Devil I Know	
"Made For This"	2023	Devil I Know	
"Cool Little Bars"	2023	Devil I Know	
"Ain't Enough Cowboy Songs	2024	Non-album single	
"Rattlesnake Preacher"	2025	Wild	
"Arkansas Mud"	2026	Wild	
"Bottle Told Me To"	2026	Wild	
"Lines in the Carpet"	2026	Wild	

== Other charted songs ==
List of songs, with selected chart positions, showing other relevant details
Title	Year	Peak chart positions	Album
Title	Year	US Country Songs	Album
"Fooled Around and Fell in Love" (Miranda Lambert featuring Maren Morris, Ashley McBryde, Tenille Townes, Caylee Hammack, and Elle King)	2019	47	—N/a

== Music videos ==
List of music videos, showing year released and director
Title	Year	Director(s)	Ref.
"A Little Dive Bar in Dahlonega"	2017	Reid Long	
"American Scandal"	2018	Horatio Baltz	
"Girl Goin' Nowhere" (Live)	2019	Ryan McElmore	
"One Night Standards"	2019	Reid Long	
"Martha Divine"	2020	Reid Long	
"Hang in There Girl"	2020	Reid Long	
"First Thing I Reach For"	2020	Reid Long	
"Never Wanted to Be That Girl" (with Carly Pearce)	2021	Alexa Campbell	
"Bonfire at Tina's" (featuring Caylee Hammack, Brandy Clark, and Pillbox Patti)	2022	Reid Long	
"Light On in the Kitchen"	2023	Reid Long	
"Rattlesnake Preacher"	2025	Tyler Shoemaker	
"What If We Don't"	2026	Brandon Campbell	
"Arkansas Mud"	2026	Brandon Campbell	
"Bottle Tells Me So"	2026	Brandon Campbell	
"Lines in the Carpet"	2026	Brandon Campbell	
"Creosote"	2026	Brandon Campbell	
"Ten to Midnight"	2026	Brandon Campbell	
"Wild"	2026	Brandon Campbell	
"Hand Me Downs"	2026	Brandon Campbell	
"Water in the River"	2026	Brandon Campbell	
"Behind Bars"	2026	Brandon Campbell	

== Other album appearances ==
List of non-single guest appearances, with other performing artists, showing year released and album name
Title	Year	Other artist(s)	Album	Ref.
"You're Gonna Miss Me When I'm Gone"	2019	Brooks & Dunn	Reboot	
"Mean Something"	2020	Caylee Hammack; Tenille Townes	If It Wasn't for You	
"If Only"	2020	Shenandoah	Every Road	
"Outlaw Blood"	2020	Ray Wylie Hubbard	Co-Starring	
"Did I Shave My Legs for This? (2021 Version)"	2021	Deana Carter; Terri Clark; Sara Evans; Vince Gill	Did I Shave My Legs for This? (25th Anniversary Edition)	
"Strawberry Wine (2021 Version)"	2021	Deana Carter; Lauren Alaina; Terri Clark; Vince Gill; Martina McBride; Kylie Morgan	Did I Shave My Legs for This? (25th Anniversary Edition)	
"Straight Tequila Night"	2022	N/A	Something Borrowed, Something New: A Tribute to John Anderson	
"Yard Sale"	2026	Ashland Craft; Mae Estes	Dive Bar Beauty Queen	
