= Light On in the Kitchen =

Single by Ashley McBryde

from the album The Devil I Know
- Released: February 24, 2023
- Studio: Neon Cross Studios
- Genre: Bluegrass; country
- Length: 3:32
- Label: Warner Music Nashville
- Songwriters: Jessi Alexander; Connie Harrington; Ashley McBryde
- Producer: Jay Joyce

Ashley McBryde singles chronology
"Never Wanted to Be That Girl" (2021)	"Light On in the Kitchen" (2023)	"The Devil I Know" (2024)

Music video
- "Light On in the Kitchen" on YouTube

"Light On in the Kitchen" is a song by American country music singer Ashley McBryde. The song was co-written by McBryde, along with Jessi Alexander and Connie Harrington. The song's concept is centered around the messages that women give to other women throughout their lives. It was released on February 24, 2023 as the lead single from McBryde's fourth studio album The Devil I Know.

== Background and composition ==
Ashley McBryde released three critically acclaimed studio albums prior to the release of "Light On in the Kitchen". The 2017 album Girl Going Nowhere produced the single "A Little Dive Bar in Dahlonega" and received a Grammy nomination. The 2020 album Never Will spawned the top 20 single "One Night Standards" and was given several more award nominations. In 2022, she topped the country charts with the Carly Pearce duet "Never Wanted to Be That Girl". Her third studio album, Lindeville, was also released the same year.

McBryde's recent success prompted her to reflect on the type of person and artist she wanted to be. She also turned to the values and words of wisdom passed down by the female figures in her family. This inspired the writing of "Light On in the Kitchen". McBryde co-wrote the song with Jessi Alexander and Connie Harrington, who also drew inspiration from female figures in their lives. The song's lyrics showcase the different words of wisdom women pass on to other women in their families. "Writing this song showed me how necessary that simple comfort had been," McBryde explained.

== Critical reception ==
"Light On in the Kitchen" has since received positive reviews from critics and writers. Jeremy Chua praised McBryde's subtle vocal delivery: "McBryde sings over gently-strummed guitar chords and brushed drums, allowing her delicate delivery to take center stage." MusicRow magazine's Robert K. Oermann also gave it a positive review when commenting on the March 2023 single releases. "The singer carries strength and love with her everywhere, thanks to the support and wisdom of Mama. Immensely tender and wonderfully listenable. I believed every word, and that’s the mark of a great country record," he stated. Kevin John Coyne of Country Universe gave an "A" rating and commented, "'Light On in the Kitchen' captures how parenting doesn’t end when we reach adulthood. Sometimes our parents are still there physically, leaving a light on in the kitchen so we can drop by when we’re having troubles."

== Production and release ==
McBryde's longtime producer Jay Joyce recorded "Light On in the Kitchen". While immediately believing the song could be a commercial success, he chose to avoid making it "radio friendly" as well. "It’s hard not to think that way, particularly if they [McBryde's team] put that on you," he told Billboard. The song was produced by Joyce at Neon Cross Studios. While incorporating McBryde's sound, Joyce also added an element of Bluegrass into the song's musical style. Instruments such as the mandolin gave it this effect, according to Billboard.

"Light On in the Kitchen" was released on February 24, 2023, via Warner Music Nashville. It was offered in a digital format. The song will serve as the lead single for McBryde's next studio album. It has since debuted on the American Billboard Country Airplay chart.

== Music video ==
The music video for "Light On in the Kitchen" premiered on June 14, 2023. Directed by Reid Long, it was filmed in black-and-white and shot in one long take which requires significant rehearsal and preparation. The video opens with McBryde sitting in her childhood bedroom, before later moving to the kitchen area, where mother-daughter interactions are depicted behind her. It also features footage of old home movies shown on a projector screen and the singer performing with her band. It was filmed in her hometown of Waldron, Arkansas, and includes a cameo of her own mother, Martha.

It was nominated for the Country Music Association Award for Video of the Year at the 57th Annual Country Music Association Awards.

== Charts ==
Chart performance for "Light On in the Kitchen"
Chart (2023)	Peak position
Canada Country (Billboard)	34
US Bubbling Under Hot 100 (Billboard)	20
US Country Airplay (Billboard)	22
US Hot Country Songs (Billboard)	45
