= 56th Academy of Country Music Awards =

US music awards ceremony in 2021

- Date: April 18, 2021
- Location: Grand Ole Opry House; Ryman Auditorium; The Bluebird Cafe; Station Inn; Nashville Riverfront; Lower Broadway
- Hosted by: Keith Urban; Mickey Guyton

Highlights
- Most wins: Lee Brice; Maren Morris; Carly Pearce; (2 each)
- Most nominations: Miranda Lambert; Maren Morris; Chris Stapleton; (4 each)

Television/radio coverage
- Network: CBS
- Viewership: 6.28 million

The 56th Academy of Country Music Awards were held on April 18, 2021, in Nashville, Tennessee, and broadcast from various locations around Nashville. The evening was co-hosted by Keith Urban and Mickey Guyton. The ceremony involved no ticketed audience due to the ongoing COVID-19 pandemic, but featured a limited number of health care workers.

== Background ==
On March 11, 2021, CBS announced that the ceremony would be co-hosted by Keith Urban and Mickey Guyton. With her involvement, Guyton became the first African-American female, and second African-American overall, to host the ceremony, after Charley Pride, who co-hosted the ceremony in 1984. The full list of performers were announced on April 5, 2021, which included a record four Black artists.

Due to the COVID-19 pandemic, the show followed a similar format to the 55th ceremony, utilizing several locations and including a mix of live and pre-recorded performances. As with the 55th ceremony, presentations took place at the Grand Ole Opry House, Ryman Auditorium, and the Bluebird Café, while performances were also held at The Station Inn, Lower Broadway, and the Cumberland River. Unlike the previous ceremony, a limited number of health care workers were also invited to attend the components of the ceremony at the Grand Ole Opry House and Ryman Auditorium, seated on the balconies (while the main floors were used to seat rotating groups of nominees).

On February 3, 2021, the ACM announced that Morgan Wallen would be ineligible to receive nominations or be involved with the ceremony, amid criticism of Wallen over a video that depicted him using a racial slur. The ACM stated that it "does not condone or support intolerance or behavior that doesn't align with our commitment and dedication to diversity and inclusion." The nominees were announced on February 21, 2021, with Miranda Lambert, Maren Morris and Chris Stapleton leading with four nods each.

== Winners and nominees ==
All nominees are listed below, and the winners are listed in bold.

Entertainer of the Year	Album of the Year
**Luke Bryan**; Eric Church; Luke Combs; Thomas Rhett; Chris Stapleton	**Starting Over – Chris Stapleton**; Born Here Live Here Die Here – Luke Bryan; Mixtape Vol. 1 – Kane Brown; Never Will – Ashley McBryde; Skeletons – Brothers Osborne
Female Artist of the Year	Male Artist of the Year
**Maren Morris**; Kelsea Ballerini; Miranda Lambert; Ashley McBryde; Carly Pearce	**Thomas Rhett**; Dierks Bentley; Eric Church; Luke Combs; Chris Stapleton
Group of the Year	Duo of the Year
**Old Dominion**; Lady A; Little Big Town; The Cadillac Three; The Highwomen	**Dan + Shay**; Brooks & Dunn; Brothers Osborne; Florida Georgia Line; Maddie & Tae
Single of the Year	Song of the Year
**"I Hope You're Happy Now" – Carly Pearce and Lee Brice**; "Bluebird" – Miranda Lambert; "I Hope" – Gabby Barrett; "More Hearts Than Mine" – Ingrid Andress; "The Bones" – Maren Morris	**"The Bones" – Jimmy Robbins, Maren Morris, Laura Veltz**; "Bluebird" – Luke Dick, Miranda Lambert, Natalie Hemby; "One Night Standards" – Ashley McBryde, Nicolette Hayford, Shane McAnally; "Some People Do" – Jesse Frasure, Matt Ramsey, Thomas Rhett, Shane McAnally; "Starting Over" – Chris Stapleton, Mike Henderson
New Female Artist of the Year	New Male Artist of the Year
**Gabby Barrett**; Ingrid Andress; Tenille Arts; Mickey Guyton; Caylee Hammack	**Jimmie Allen**; Travis Denning; Hardy; Cody Johnson; Parker McCollum
Songwriter of the Year	Video of the Year
**Hillary Lindsey**; Ashley Gorley; Michael Hardy; Shane McAnally; Josh Osborne	**"Worldwide Beautiful" – Kane Brown; Dir. Alex Alvga**; "Better Than We Found It" – Maren Morris; Dir. Gabrielle Woodland; "Bluebird" – Miranda Lambert; Dir. Trey Fanjoy; "Gone" – Dierks Bentley; Dir. Wes Edwards, Ed Pryor; "Hallelujah" – Carrie Underwood and John Legend; Dir. Randee St. Nicholas
Music Event of the Year
**"I Hope You're Happy Now" – Carly Pearce and Lee Brice**; "Be a Light" – Thomas Rhett, Reba McEntire, Hillary Scott, Chris Tomlin and Keith Urban; "Does to Me" – Luke Combs and Eric Church; "Nobody but You" – Blake Shelton and Gwen Stefani; "One Beer" – Hardy, Lauren Alaina and Devin Dawson; "One Too Many" – Keith Urban and P!nk

== Performances ==
On April 15, 2021, the ACMs announced the official setlist for the ceremony. Luke Bryan was originally scheduled to perform at the ceremony but had to withdraw after testing positive for COVID-19. He was replaced by Lady A.

Performer(s)	Song(s)
Miranda Lambert; Elle King	"Drunk (And I Don't Wanna Go Home)"
Lady A	"Like a Lady"
Alan Jackson	"Drive (For Daddy Gene)" "You'll Always Be My Baby"
Brothers Osborne	"I'm Not For Everyone "Dead Man's Curve"
Chris Young; Kane Brown	"Famous Friends"
Eric Church	"Bunch of Nothing"
Maren Morris; Ryan Hurd	"Chasing After You"
Carrie Underwood; CeCe Winans	"Amazing Grace" "Great Is Thy Faithfulness" "The Old Rugged Cross" "How Great Thou Art"
Gabby Barrett; Cade Foehner	"The Good Ones"
Jimmie Allen; Brad Paisley	"Freedom Was a Highway"
Miranda Lambert; Jack Ingram; Jon Randall	"In His Arms"
Blake Shelton	"Austin" "Minimum Wage"
Carly Pearce; Lee Brice	"I Hope You're Happy Now"
Keith Urban	"Tumbleweed"
Kelsea Ballerini; Kenny Chesney	"Half of My Hometown"
Kenny Chesney	"Knowing You"
Luke Combs	"Forever After All"
Mickey Guyton	"Hold On"
Thomas Rhett	"Country Again" "What's Your Country Song"
Chris Stapleton; Miranda Lambert	"Maggie's Song"
Dan + Shay	"Glad You Exist"
Little Big Town	"Wine, Beer, Whiskey"
Ashley McBryde	"Martha Divine"
Dierks Bentley; The War and Treaty; Larkin Poe	"Pride (In the Name of Love)"

== Presenters ==
On April 16, 2021, the ACMs announced the presenters for the ceremony:

Presenters
Ingrid Andress
Blanco Brown
Amy Grant
Leslie Jordan
Martina McBride
Dolly Parton
Darius Rucker
Clay Walker

== Reception ==
The ceremony was generally well received. Noted for its "efforts to add diversity to its ranks" said the Rolling Stone, "the broadcast hit nearly all the right notes". The 56th ACM Awards gained 6.28 million viewers making it the lowest-rated and least watched ACM Awards to date, but still topping all of broadcast in the demo and drew larger audience than its network competitors combined.
