= 57th Annual Country Music Association Awards =

2023 awards ceremony

- Date: November 8, 2023
- Location: Bridgestone Arena, Nashville, Tennessee
- Hosted by: Luke Bryan; Peyton Manning

Highlights
- Most wins: Lainey Wilson (5)
- Most nominations: Lainey Wilson (9)

Television/radio coverage
- Network: ABC, Hulu
- Viewership: 6.8 million

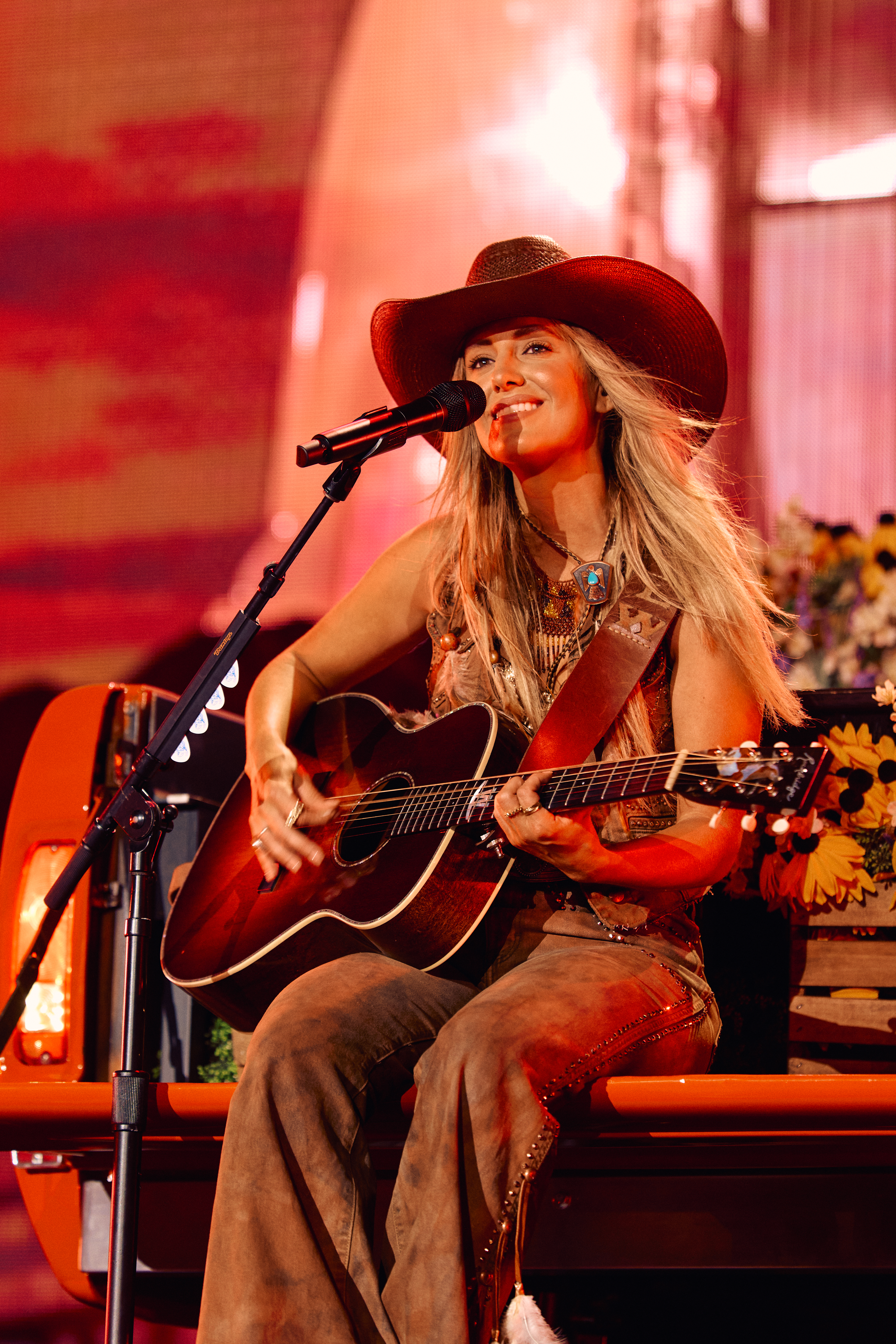
Lainey Wilson, Entertainer of the Year recipient.

The 57th Annual Country Music Association Awards were held on November 8, 2023, at the Bridgestone Arena in Nashville, Tennessee. The ceremony were hosted once again by Luke Bryan with Peyton Manning. The ceremony was broadcast live on ABC and is available to stream on Hulu.

== Background ==
On May 16, 2023, the Association announced that multiple CMA award winner Luke Bryan and NFL superstar Peyton Manning would once again return as the hosts for the upcoming ceremony. They also announced their balloting schedule for the 2023 ceremony, as well as the eligibility dates for the nominees, from July 1, 2022, to June 30, 2023.

== Winners and nominees ==
Nominations were announced on September 7, 2023. Lainey Wilson leads in nominations with nine, followed by Jelly Roll with five.

Entertainer of the Year	Album of the Year
Lainey Wilson; Luke Combs; Chris Stapleton; Carrie Underwood; Morgan Wallen	Bell Bottom Country — Lainey Wilson; Ashley McBryde Presents: Lindeville — Ashley McBryde; Gettin' Old — Luke Combs; One Thing at a Time — Morgan Wallen; Rolling Up the Welcome Mat — Kelsea Ballerini
Male Vocalist of the Year	Female Vocalist of the Year
Chris Stapleton; Luke Combs; Jelly Roll; Cody Johnson; Morgan Wallen	Lainey Wilson; Kelsea Ballerini; Miranda Lambert; Ashley McBryde; Carly Pearce
Vocal Group of the Year	Vocal Duo of the Year
Old Dominion; Lady A; Little Big Town; Midland; Zac Brown Band	Brothers Osborne; Brooks & Dunn; Dan + Shay; Maddie & Tae; The War and Treaty
Single of the Year	Song of the Year
"Fast Car" — Luke Combs; "Heart Like a Truck" — Lainey Wilson; "Need a Favor" — Jelly Roll; "Next Thing You Know" — Jordan Davis; "Wait in the Truck" — HARDY (feat. Lainey Wilson)	"Fast Car" — Tracy Chapman; "Heart Like a Truck" — Trannie Anderson, Dallas Wilson and Lainey Wilson; "Next Thing You Know" — Jordan Davis, Greylan James, Chase McGill and Josh Osborne; "Tennessee Orange" — David Fanning, Paul Jenkins, Megan Moroney and Ben Williams; "Wait in the Truck" — Renee Blair, Michael Hardy, Hunter Phelps and Jordan Schmidt
New Artist of the Year	Musician of the Year
Jelly Roll; Zach Bryan; Parker McCollum; Megan Moroney; Hailey Whitters	Jenee Fleenor; Paul Franklin; Rob McNelley; Derek Wells; Charlie Worsham
Music Video of the Year	Musical Event of the Year
"Wait in the Truck" — HARDY (feat. Lainey Wilson); "Light On in the Kitchen" — Ashley McBryde; "Memory Lane" — Old Dominion; "Need a Favor" — Jelly Roll; "Next Thing You Know" — Jordan Davis	"Wait in the Truck" — HARDY (feat. Lainey Wilson); "Save Me" — Jelly Roll and Lainey Wilson; "She Had Me at Heads Carolina (Remix)" — Cole Swindell and Jo Dee Messina; "Thank God" — Kane Brown and Katelyn Brown; "We Don't Fight Anymore" — Carly Pearce (feat. Chris Stapleton)

=== International Awards ===
The international nominees were announced on September 13, 2023.

International Artist Achievement Award	Global Country Artist Award
Luke Combs; Kip Moore; Morgan Wallen	Kaylee Bell; Casey Barnes; Tebey

=== Industry Awards ===
- Humanitarian Award: Darius Rucker
- Joe Talbot Award: Jeannie Seely

== Performers ==
The first set of performers was announced on October 25, 2023. The second set was announced on November 1, 2023.

Performer(s)	Song(s)
Jelly Roll; Wynonna Judd	"Need a Favor"
Luke Bryan	No. 1 Hits Medley "Huntin', Fishin' and Lovin' Every Day" "One Margarita" "That's My Kind of Night" "Play It Again" "Country Girl (Shake It for Me)"
Ashley McBryde	"Light On in the Kitchen"
Cody Johnson	"The Painter"
Morgan Wallen; Eric Church	"Man Made a Bar"
Luke Combs	"Where the Wild Things Are"
Chris Stapleton	"White Horse"
Jordan Davis	"Next Thing You Know"
Lainey Wilson	"Wildflowers and Wild Horses"
Dan + Shay	"Save Me the Trouble"
Kelsea Ballerini	"Leave Me Again"
The War and Treaty	"That's How Love Is Made"
Kenny Chesney; Mac McAnally; Alan Jackson; Zac Brown Band	Jimmy Buffett Tribute Performance "A Pirate Looks at Forty" "Margaritaville"
Old Dominion; Megan Moroney	"Can't Break Up Now"
Carly Pearce; Chris Stapleton	"We Don't Fight Anymore"
HARDY; Morgan Wallen; Post Malone	Joe Diffie Country Classics Medley "John Deere Green" "Pickup Man"
Tanya Tucker; Little Big Town	"Delta Dawn"
Jelly Roll; K. Michelle	"Love Can Build a Bridge"

== Presenters ==
The presenters for the 57th CMA awards were announced on November 6.

Presenter(s)	Notes
Corey Seager, Parker McCollum, and Brian Kelley	Presented Single of the Year
Bill Anderson and Sara Evans	Presented Song of The Year
Craig Morgan	Introduced Luke Bryan's performance
Kevin Cahoon and Hailey Whitters	Presented Vocal Duo of the Year
Chris Young	Presented "Music Teacher Appreciation" and the Chevy Trax to teacher Brenda Gregory
Cynthia Erivo	Presented Vocal Group of the Year
Gerry Turner and Lady A	Presented New Artist of the Year
Paula Abdul and Darius Rucker	Presented Album of the Year
Jordan Davis	Introduced Crown Royal "That Deserves A Crown" to "Bunker Labs"
Nate Bargatze	Presented Male Vocalist of the Year
Martina McBride	Presented Female Vocalist of the Year
Keith Urban	Presented Entertainer of the Year

== Milestones ==
- Lainey Wilson becomes the first and only artist to top the nominations list in their first two appearances on the final list of nominees, having also lead the nominations at the previous ceremony. Wilson is the first new female artist to be nominated for Entertainer of the Year since Carrie Underwood received her first nomination in 2016. Wilson is also the first artist to have two nominations in the Single of the Year category in the same year since 2010, when Miranda Lambert's hits "White Liar" and "The House That Built Me" were both nominated.
- Lainey Wilson now ties Merle Haggard and Miranda Lambert for the second most nominations in a single year with nine nominations. Alan Jackson holds the record with 10 in 2002.
- This is the first time in CMA history that two women have been nominated for Entertainer of the Year in four consecutive years.
- Miranda Lambert ties with Martina McBride for the second most nominations in the Female Vocalist of the Year category, with seventeen. Reba McEntire leads with eighteen nominations.
- The War and Treaty became the first African-American duo to be nominated for Duo of the Year, and the first married couple nominated since Thompson Square in 2015. They are also the first mixed gender duo to be nominated since Sugarland in 2018.
- Brooks & Dunn extend their lead for most nominations in the Duo of the Year category, with twenty four.
- Jo Dee Messina receives her first nomination in over two decades. She was last nominated in 2002 for Vocal Event of the Year for her collaboration with Tim McGraw, “Bring On The Rain.”
- Old Dominion wins Vocal Group of the Year, tying The Statler Brothers, Little Big Town, and Rascal Flatts for the longest win streak in the category with six.
- Jay Joyce is now third in most career nominations for Album of the Year with 15, only behind producer Tony Brown (24) and George Strait (19).
- Little Big Town has the longest consecutive nomination streak for Vocal Group. They have been on the final ballot for 18 years in a row since 2006.
