= 2019 CMT Music Awards =

Annual US country music awards ceremony

- Date: June 5, 2019
- Location: Bridgestone Arena, Nashville, Tennessee
- Hosted by: Little Big Town

Highlights
- Most wins: Carrie Underwood (2)
- Most nominations: Jason Aldean; Miranda Lambert; (3 each)

Television/radio coverage
- Network: CMT
- Viewership: 2.7 million

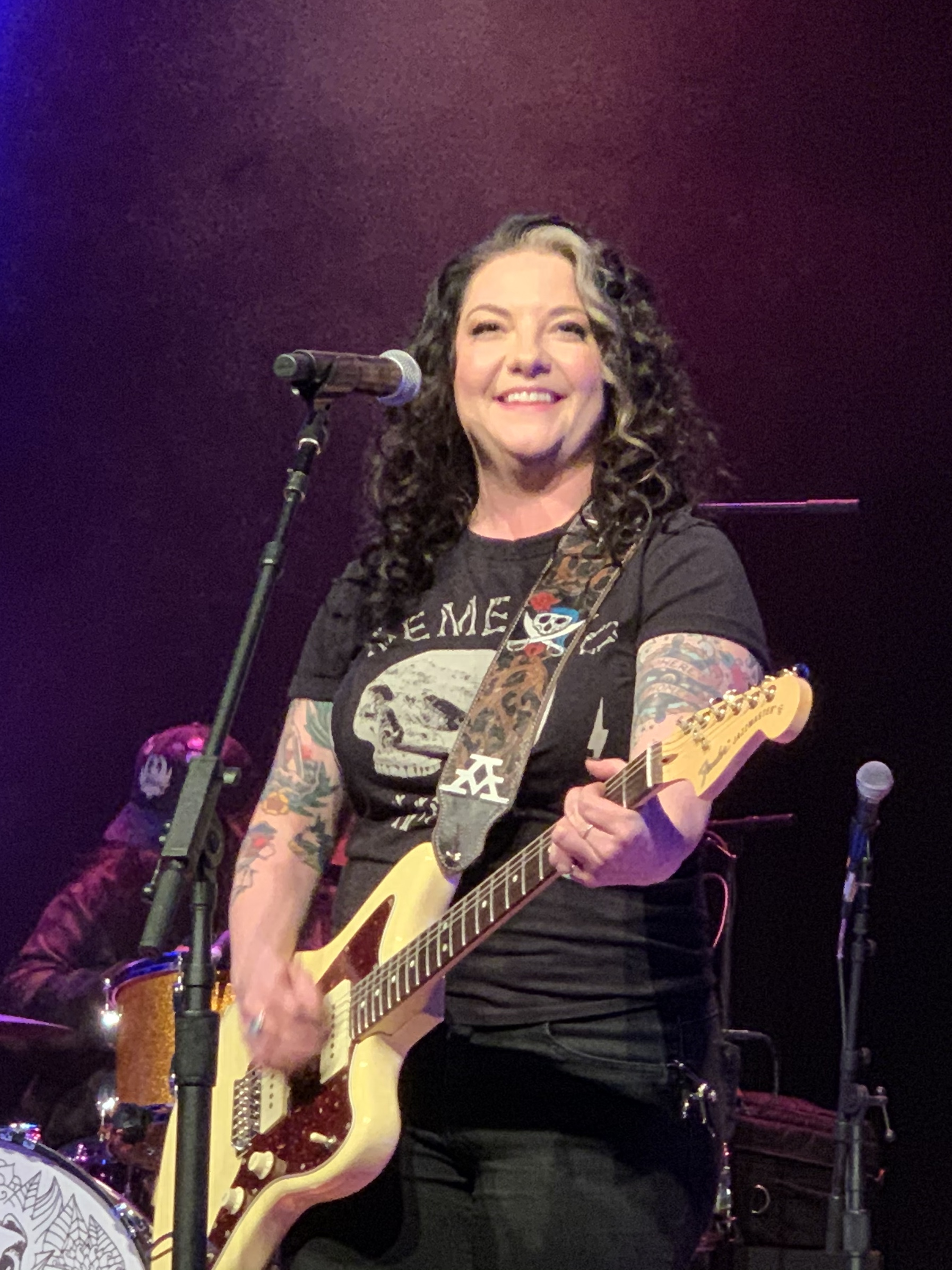
Breakthrough Video of the Year winner, Ashley McBryde.

The 2019 CMT Music Awards were held at Bridgestone Arena in Nashville, Tennessee on June 5, 2019. Little Big Town was the host for the show. The CMT Music Awards are a fan-voted awards show for country music videos and television performances; Voting takes place on CMT's website.

== Winners and nominees ==
Nominees were announced on May 7, 2017. Winners are shown in bold.

Video of the Year	Female Video of the Year
**Carrie Underwood** — **“Cry Pretty”**; Kane Brown — “Good as You”; Keith Urban and Julia Michaels — “Coming Home”; Kelsea Ballerini — “Miss Me More”; Luke Combs — “She Got the Best of Me”	**Carrie Underwood** — **“Love Wins”**; Brandi Carlile — “The Joke”; Carly Pearce — “Closer to You”; Kacey Musgraves — “Space Cowboy”; Kelsea Ballerini — “Miss Me More”; Maren Morris — “Girl”; Miranda Lambert — “Keeper of the Flame”
Male Video of the Year	Group Video of the Year
**Kane Brown** — **“Lose It”**; Cole Swindell — “Break Up in the End”; Eric Church — “Desperate Man”; Jason Aldean and Miranda Lambert — “Drowns the Whiskey”; Kenny Chesney — “Get Along”; Luke Bryan — “Sunrise, Sunburn, Sunset”; Thomas Rhett — “Life Changes”	**Zac Brown Band** — **“Someone I Used to Know”**; Eli Young Band — “Love Ain't”; LANCO — “Born to Love You”; Little Big Town — “Summer Fever”; Midland — “Burn Out”; Old Dominion — “Hotel Key”
Duo Video of the Year	Breakthrough Video of the Year
**Dan + Shay** — **“Speechless”**; Brothers Osborne — “I Don't Remember Me (Before You)”; Florida Georgia Line — “Simple”; LoCash — “Feels Like A Party”; Maddie & Tae — “Friends Don't”; Sugarland and Taylor Swift — “Babe”	**Ashley McBryde** — **“Girl Goin' Nowhere (At Marathon Music Works)”**; Jimmie Allen — “Best Shot”; Jordan Davis — “Take It from Me”; Mitchell Tenpenny — “Drunk Me”; Morgan Wallen — “Whiskey Glasses”; Runaway June — “Buy My Own Drinks”; Tenille Townes — “Somebody's Daughter”
Collaborative Video of the Year	CMT Performance of the Year
**Keith Urban and Julia Michaels** — **“Coming Home”**; Brantley Gilbert and Lindsay Ell — “What Happens in a Small Town”; Darius Rucker, Jason Aldean, Luke Bryan and Charles Kelley — “Straight to Hell”; Dierks Bentley and Brothers Osborne — “Burning Man”; Jason Aldean and Miranda Lambert — “Drowns the Whiskey”; Sugarland and Taylor Swift — “Babe”	**From CMT Crossroads: Luke Combs and Leon Bridges** — **“Beautiful Crazy”**; From CMT Crossroads: Boyz II Men and Brett Young — “Motownphilly”; From 2018 CMT Artists of the Year: Maren Morris and Brandi Carlile — “(You Make Me Feel Like) A Natural Woman”; From CMT Crossroads: Brett Eldredge and Meghan Trainor — “Let You Be Right"; From 2018 CMT Artists of the Year: Karen Fairchild, Kimberly Schlapman and Gladys Knight — “I Can't Make You Love Me” / “Help Me Make It Through the Night”; From CMT Crossroads: Zac Brown Band and Shawn Mendes — “Keep Me in Mind”
