= Bed of Roses (album) =

2025 studio album by Caylee Hammack

Studio album by Caylee Hammack
- Released: March 7, 2025
- Genre: Country
- Label: Capitol Nashville
- Producer: Caylee Hammack; Dann Huff; John Osborne

Caylee Hammack chronology
If It Wasn't for You (2020)	Bed of Roses (2025)

Bed of Roses is the second studio album by American country music artist Caylee Hammack. It was released on March 7, 2025, through Capitol Nashville.

== Content ==
The album was announced in January 2025, alongside the release of its title track as a promotional single, which was described as the "heart" of the album. The music video for "Bed of Roses" also premiered on January 10, 2025. "The Hill" and "Breaking Dishes" were previously issued as promotional singles ahead of the album in 2024.

Hammack co-wrote 12 of the album's 13 tracks and co-produced the album with Dann Huff and John Osborne of Brothers Osborne. The lone track she didn't have a hand in writing, "Mammas", is a re-imagined version of "Mammas Don't Let Your Babies Grow Up to Be Cowboys", which was first recorded by its writer Ed Bruce in 1975. On the album's title and subject matter, Hammack said: "Your bed of roses is the bed you make—you get to decide how you spend your time and how you plant your garden. Good love is flowers that come back every year. Bad love, it's just the thorn. Sometimes you've got to till shit up. You've got to work through things, and it's not going to be fun. And then one day, your friends come over and you sit as a family on the back porch in the garden. And when they compliment the roses near the gate or the cherry tomatoes speckled about in the pasta, you get the pleasure of realizing, 'I grew that, I put love, time and belief into something, and it paid off.'"

It was accompanied by the dual release of a book she co-authored with Carolyn Brown titled after the album. Conceptually, the book's chapters correspond with each of the album's 13 tracks and "takes readers on a journey of transformation, from heartbreak to healing."

== Track listing ==
Bed of Roses track listing
No.	Title	Writer(s)	Length
1.	"Bed of Roses"	Caylee Hammack; Benjy Davis; Jeff Hyde	4:43
2.	"Breaking Dishes"	Hammack; Mikey Reaves; Gordie Sampson	3:51
3.	"What My Angels Think of Me"	Hammack; Meg McRee; Jake Mitchell	4:31
4.	"Back Again"	Hammack; Tofer Brown; Lauren Hungate	3:21
5.	"Mammas"	Ed Bruce; Patsy Bruce; Mia Mantia; SJ McDonald; Trent Wayne	3:53
6.	"No I Ain't"	Hammack; Mark Trussell; Stephen Wilson Jr.	3:22
7.	"The Hill"	Hammack; Tenille Townes; Logan Wall	3:03
8.	"The Pot & the Kettle"	Hammack; Connor Thuotte; Wilson	2:58
9.	"Bread & Butter"	Hammack; Luke Dick; Hyde	2:56
10.	"Cleopatra"	Hammack; McRee; Mitchell	3:22
11.	"How Long"	Hammack; John Osborne; Lucie Silvas	4:15
12.	"Oh, Kara"	Hammack	2:23
13.	"Tumbleweed Men"	Hammack; Joe Clemmons; Davis	3:24
Total length:			46:05

== Release history ==
Region	Date	Format(s)	Label	Ref.
Worldwide	March 7, 2025	CD; digital download	Capitol Nashville	
