= Family tree (disambiguation) =

A family tree is a chart representing family relationships in a conventional tree structure.

Family tree may also refer to:

== Film and television ==
- Family Tree (1999 film), an American film directed by Duane Clark
- Family Tree, a 2003 short film with music by Michael A. Levine
- Family Tree (2010 film), a French film directed by Olivier Ducastel and Jacques Martineau
- The Family Tree (film), a 2011 American film directed by Vivi Friedman
- The Family Tree (TV series), a 1983 American drama series
- Family Tree (TV series), a 2013 British-American mockumentary series
- "Family Tree", an episode of The Ghosts of Motley Hall

== Literature ==
- Family Tree (magazine), an American genealogy periodical
- Family Tree, a 1996 novel by Katherine Ayres
- The Family Tree, a 1997 novel by Sheri S. Tepper
- The Family Tree, a 2005 novel by Carole Cadwalladr
- Family Tree, a syndicated daily comic strip by Signe Wilkinson

== Music ==
- Family Tree Records, a South African record label
- Family Tree, a 1960s folk-rock group featuring Bob Segarini
- Family Tree, a grime music group featuring Merky ACE

=== Albums ===
- Family Tree (Björk album), 2002
- Family Tree (Black Stone Cherry album) or the title song, 2018
- Family Tree (Melinda Schneider album) or the title song, 2002
- Family Tree (N.W.A album), 2008
- Family Tree (Nick Drake album), 2007
- Family Tree (Oh Land album) or the title song, 2019
- Family Tree (Oregon album) or the title song, 2012
- Family Tree, by Kylie Auldist, 2016

=== Songs ===
- "Family Tree" (Darryl Worley song), 2002
- "Family Tree" (Kings of Leon song), 2014
- "Family Tree" (Caylee Hammack song), 2019
- "Family Tree", by Belle & Sebastian Fold Your Hands Child, You Walk Like a Peasant, 2000
- "Family Tree", by Bone Thugs-n-Harmony from The Art of War, 1997
- "Family Tree", by Ethel Cain from Preacher's Daughter, 2022
- "Family Tree", by Gerry Rafferty from Night Owl, 1979
- "Family Tree", by Jewel from Picking Up the Pieces, 2015
- "Family Tree", by Loretta Lynn from Van Lear Rose, 2004
- "Family Tree", by Megadeth from Youthanasia, 1994
- "Family Tree", by Ramz, 2018
- "Family Tree", by TV on the Radio from Dear Science, 2008
- "Family Tree", by Priscilla Renea from Coloured, 2018
- "Family Tree (Intro)", by Ethel Cain from Preacher's Daughter, 2022

== Other uses ==
- Family tree (horticulture), a tree grafted with multiple cultivars of a species
- Family Tree, a 2010 art installation by Tal Rosner
