= The Devil I Know =

Studio album by Ashley McBryde
- Released: September 8, 2023
- Recorded: 2021–2022
- Studio: Neon Cross (Nashville)
- Genre: Country
- Length: 37:59
- Label: Warner Nashville
- Producer: Jay Joyce

Ashley McBryde chronology
Lindeville (2022)	The Devil I Know (2023)	Wild (2026)

Singles from The Devil I Know
- 1. "Light On in the Kitchen" Released: February 24, 2023; 2. "The Devil I Know" Released: March 4, 2024

The Devil I Know is the fourth studio album by American country music singer-songwriter Ashley McBryde, and released on September 8, 2023, by Warner Records Nashville. It was preceded by the lead single "Light On in the Kitchen" and includes the title track, which was later released as the second single, and promotional singles "Learned to Lie", "Made for This", and "Cool Little Bars". It follows her 2022 concept album Lindeville and re-teams her with producer Jay Joyce, whom she worked with on her first two albums Girl Going Nowhere and Never Will, and features eleven tracks, all of which were co-written by McBryde.

== Background ==
The Devil I Know had already been completed when McBryde began writing and recording Lindeville with John Osborne and a series of collaborators, and she submitted both albums to her label simultaneously, stating that they were aware she had been working on something in addition to her "proper" third record but did not know what. McBryde was able to convince the label to release Lindeville first, and explained that "Blackout Betty", a song written with Nicolette Hayford and Aaron Raitiere for The Devil I Know, had helped to inspire the idea for the project that would eventually become Lindeville. McBryde described the process of recording both albums over a three-month period between late 2021 and early 2022 as "going over to a friend's house for a sleepover and then deciding to stay an extra day" and noted the intentional contrast between Lindeville, a project featuring songs about fictional characters inhabiting the titular town, and The Devil I Know, which veered more towards introspection and reflection of McBryde's real life experiences on the road. She and producer Jay Joyce recorded the majority of the album live with McBryde's touring band Deadhorse.

McBryde released the album's lead single, "Light On in the Kitchen", on February 24, 2023. It was written with Connie Harrington, a significant contributor to Lindeville, and Jessi Alexander about the importance of female figures in their lives and received a positive response from critics.

The album was officially announced on June 2, 2023. Discussing the concept of the album, McBryde stated that it was created as a pushback to some of her critics, noting "'Y'all are too country.' We leaned into that – more country it is. Y'all are awfully rock leaning for a country artist.' Is that so? You ain't seen nothin' yet. 'Last thing y'all need is another tender, finger pickin' song.' Oh? Tender makes you uneasy, cowboy? I hear you. Let's see how much more tender we can be. We listened to all those opinions and said, 'I hear you. I understand what you're saying.' But sadly, there's no room on the record for your opinion. We'll do what we want."

== Critical reception ==
Veteran critic Robert Christgau gave the album an "A" in his "Consumer Guide," applauding the subject matter and the "impressive clarity and deliberation" with which McBryde sings.

== Track listing ==
All tracks are written by Ashley McBryde, with additional co-writers as noted.

No.	Title	Writer(s)	Length
1.	"Made for This"	Travis Meadows	3:43
2.	"Coldest Beer in Town"	Nicolette Hayford; Autumn McEntire	3:39
3.	"Light On in the Kitchen"	Jessi Alexander; Connie Harrington	3:32
4.	"Women Ain't Whiskey"	Hillary Lindsey; Chris LaCorte; Jon Nite	2:46
5.	"Learned to Lie"	Hayford; Sean McConnell	3:50
6.	"The Devil I Know"	Bobby Pinson; Jeremy Stover	3:07
7.	"Single at the Same Time"	Andy Albert; Benjy Davis	3:41
8.	"Cool Little Bars"	Trick Savage; Lainey Wilson	3:42
9.	"Whiskey and Country Music"	Lee Thomas Miller; John Osborne	2:57
10.	"Blackout Betty"	Hayford; Aaron Raitiere	4:01
11.	"6th of October"	CJ Field; Blue Foley	3:01
Total length:			37:59

== Personnel ==
Credits adapted from the album's liner notes.

=== Musicians ===
- Ashley McBryde – lead vocals (all tracks), acoustic guitar (tracks 2, 6, 8, 9, 11), background vocals (3, 5, 8), electric guitar (5, 10)
- Quinn Hill – drums (all tracks), percussion (8, 11)
- Jay Joyce – keyboards (all tracks), electric guitar (1, 2, 4–7, 10), acoustic guitar (1, 3, 4, 6, 8), clapping (1), programming (1–3, 6, 8), percussion (1, 10), bass (4)
- Chris Harris – background vocals (1, 2, 4–11), acoustic guitar (1, 4–7, 9, 10), mandolin (2, 3, 9), bouzouki (2, 8, 11)
- Chris Sancho – bass (1–3, 5–11)
- Matt Helmkamp – electric guitar (1, 3–7, 9–11), 12-string acoustic guitar (2), acoustic guitar (6, 8)
- Jason Hall – clapping (1)
- Mickey Raphael – harmonica (8)

=== Technical and visuals ===
- Jay Joyce – production, mixing
- Jason Hall – recording, mixing
- Jimmy Mansfield – engineering assistance
- Josh Groppel – engineering assistance
- Andrew Mendelson – mastering
- Court Blankenship – production assistance
- Mike Dupree – creative direction
- Kate Bowling – art direction, design

== Charts ==
Chart performance for The Devil I Know
Chart (2023)	Peak position
Scottish Albums (Official Charts)	19
UK Album Downloads (Official Charts)	14
UK Country Albums (Official Charts)	1
US Billboard 200	158
US Top Country Albums (Billboard)	28
