= I Hope You're Happy Now (Carly Pearce and Lee Brice song) =

Single by Carly Pearce and Lee Brice

from the album Carly Pearce
- Released: September 27, 2019
- Genre: Country
- Length: 3:19
- Label: Big Machine
- Songwriter(s): Carly Pearce; Luke Combs; Randy Montana; Jonathan Singleton
- Producer(s): busbee

Carly Pearce singles chronology
"Closer to You" (2018)	"I Hope You're Happy Now" (2019)	"Next Girl" (2020)

Lee Brice singles chronology
"Rumor" (2018)	"I Hope You're Happy Now" (2019)	"One of Them Girls" (2020)

"I Hope You're Happy Now" is a song recorded by American country music artists Carly Pearce and Lee Brice. It was released in 27 September 2019 as the second single from Pearce's self-titled studio album.

== Content ==
Pearce co-wrote "I Hope You're Happy Now" with Luke Combs, Randy Montana, and Jonathan Singleton. Recorded as a duet with Lee Brice, it tells the story of a breakup from both sides, and was inspired by Pearce's own past relationship. Combs was originally going to be featured on the song, but when he chose to step down, Pearce reached out to Brice who was impressed by the lyrics and said that the song reminded him of "classic country." The track and its parent album were produced by busbee, the last project he completed before his death.

The song is composed in the key of B♭ major with a main chord pattern of B♭-Gm-E♭-B♭.

== Critical reception ==
Billy Dukes of Taste of Country described the song as "compelling" and wrote that the artists were "two of country's finest vocalists." Markos Papadatos of Digital Journal wrote that the song allowed Pearce and Brice to "showcase their storytelling abilities," and complemented their vocal chemistry. Rolling Stone named the song one of the 25 best country and Americana songs of 2019, with reviewer Jon Freeman writing, "the combination of their voices was electric", and that the song was a "true stunner".

== Music video ==
The music video for "I Hope You're Happy Now" was directed by Sam Siske and shot in a dive bar in Nashville, Tennessee located near the Grand Ole Opry, and features Pearce and Brice performing the song together on stage while patrons in the bar carry out the lyrics in the song.

== Commercial performance ==
"I Hope You're Happy Now" reached the top 30 of the Billboard Country Airplay chart in its sixth week, making it the fastest-rising single of Pearce's career. It has since reached a peak position of number one, becoming Pearce's second number one single and Brice's sixth. The song has sold 62,000 copies in the United States as of March 2020.

== Performances ==
Pearce performed the song with Charles Kelley of Lady A at the 54th Annual Country Music Association Awards on November 11, 2020, after Brice tested positive for COVID-19 a few days before, and thus was unable to perform with Pearce. Brice and Pearce were able to perform it together at the 56th Academy of Country Music Awards on April 18, 2021.

== Charts ==
=== Weekly charts ===
Chart (2019–2020)	Peak position
Canada (Canadian Hot 100)	51
Canada Country (Billboard)	1
US Billboard Hot 100	27
US Country Airplay (Billboard)	1
US Hot Country Songs (Billboard)	5
US Rolling Stone Top 100	40

=== Year-end charts ===
Chart (2020)	Position
US Billboard Hot 100	73
US Country Airplay (Billboard)	6
US Hot Country Songs (Billboard)	9

== Certifications ==
Region	Certification	Certified units/sales
Canada (Music Canada)	3× Platinum	240,000^{‡}
United States (RIAA)	3× Platinum	3,000,000^{‡}
^{‡} Sales+streaming figures based on certification alone.
