= What If We Don't =

Single by Ashley McBryde

from the album Wild
- Released: February 23, 2026
- Recorded: Pine Box Studio
- Genre: Country
- Length: 3:06
- Label: Warner Music Nashville
- Songwriters: Ashley McBryde; Terri Jo Box; Randall Clay
- Producer: John Osborne

Ashley McBryde singles chronology
"The Devil I Know" (2024)	"What If We Don't" (2026)

Music video
- "What If We Don't" on YouTube

"What If We Don't" is a song recorded by American country music artist Ashley McBryde. It was released to country music radio on February 23, 2026, as the lead single from her fifth studio album, Wild.

== Content ==
McBryde co-wrote the song with Terri Jo Box and Randall Clay. The song's idea came to them while sitting around a firepit on a back porch and "reminiscing on all the moments that [they] could've made a different choice and wondering if [they] should've," with McBryde saying: "It's about the leaps of faith that you do or don't take, and having to learn to live with those consequences either way".

Originally recorded for her 2016 EP, Jalopies & Expensive Guitars, which she released independently, McBryde decided to re-record the song ten years later. It was recorded at Pine Box Studio in Nashville, with John Osborne of Brothers Osborne producing the track.

== Music video ==
The music video for "What If We Don't" premiered alongside its digital release on January 23, 2026. Brandon Campbell directed the video, which is "inspired by a true story" wherein an adult McBryde experiences a traumatic flashback to a loss from her youth, triggered by an EMDR therapy session.

== Commercial performance ==
"What If We Don't" was the most-added song at country radio, receiving adds on 75 stations upon release, making it the biggest first week for any of McBryde's singles to date. It debuted at number 54 on the Billboard Country Airplay chart dated March 14, 2026.

== Charts ==
Chart performance for "What If We Don't"
Chart (2026)	Peak position
Canada Country (Billboard)	48
UK Country Airplay (Radiomonitor)	15
US Country Airplay (Billboard)	32
