= Caylee Hammack =

American country music singer (born 1994)

- Born: Caylee Anna Hammack; March 19, 1994 (age 32); Ellaville, Georgia, US
- Origin: Nashville, Tennessee, U.S.
- Genre: Country
- Occupations: Singer, songwriter
- Instruments: Vocals, guitar, banjo
- Years active: 2007–present
- Label: Capitol Nashville
- Website: www.cayleehammack.com

Caylee Anna Hammack (born March 19, 1994) is an American country music singer-songwriter. She is signed to Capitol Records Nashville and released her debut album If It Wasn't for You on August 14, 2020. She is signed to Red Light Management and is managed by Mary Hilliard Harrington.

== Early life ==
Hammack started playing music at age 13. While not getting much of a music education or vocal lessons at a young age, she self-taught by listening and singing songs on the country radio. The first time she had to turn down potential tennis scholarships was at age 15, after a surgery to remove a tumor. She wrote her first song, "Addictive", about the pain pills she had to take after the surgery.

While her brother played Southern rock and her sister Britney Spears songs, she discovered the country genre for herself and counts the Chicks and SHeDAISY as her early inspirations.

She received a full music scholarship to Belmont University in Nashville at age 18, but declined because her boyfriend persuaded her to stay in Ellaville with him. After she broke up with her boyfriend and was noticed by Luke Bryan, she moved to Nashville at the end of 2013 with about $1,000 of savings, a high school diploma, and her clothes in trash bags. She ran out of money and slept in her car. With a fake ID, she entered the music venues and bars and, after asking a bass player at the Honky Tonk Central on Broadway, she started to sing cover versions there weekly. Before signing a recording contract, she performed several original songs, including "Redhead".

== Career ==
After about two years of playing and writing songs, she was introduced to Universal Music Publishing Group by Robert Filhart, where she started as a staff writer. During a writers' retreat, she found out that her house in Nashville had burned down due to an electrical fire that destroyed about 70% of her belongings. Tenille Townes was at the retreat with her and helped her during this time which was the start of their friendship.

In 2018, she signed a recording contract with Capitol Nashville.

Her debut song "Family Tree" was released on January 18, 2019, and was the most-added debut song by a female artist at country radio in the previous three years. On May 29, 2019 she performed the song on the Today show in her national television debut.

In 2019, she was the opening act for Lanco, Dierks Bentley, Trisha Yearwood, and Miranda Lambert.

Hammack wrote "Small Town Hypocrite" while still being a staff writer, together with Jared Scott, about the breakup with her boyfriend who cheated on her, which eventually brought her to Nashville. Later she found out that he lived in a double-wide trailer, which made its way into the song's final verse. The song was released on February 21, 2020 and received praise from Billy Dukes of Taste of Country calling it "a product of courageous songwriting". She sent a recording to Chris Stapleton, who agreed to sing vocals on the song for a re-release in 2021

In February 2020, Hammack learned about her first ACM nomination for New Female Artist of the Year for the 2020 ACM Awards while waiting for a plane at the airport.

Hammack was scheduled as the opening act for Reba McEntire and Luke Bryan in 2020 but the tour was shortened due to the COVID-19 pandemic. The opening acts for McEntire were postponed, which left Hammack and her band with no income. During this time they offered a landscaping service to make up for the lost income. After the pandemic prevent her from opening for Reba McEntire and Luke Bryan in 2020, she got the chance to open for Luke in 2021 and in 2022 for Brad Paisley for some of the US stops during his World Tour.

Hammack hosted a Facebook event together with Ashley McBryde called CMT Next Women of Country Goes Live on April 7, 2020 and appeared on Country Outdoors LIVE special from Outdoor Channel on May 8.

Hammack's debut album, If It Wasn't for You, was released in August 2020. She wrote or co-wrote all 13 of the album's tracks. The album featured collaborations with Reba McEntire, Ashley McBryde, and Tenille Townes.

On August 13, a new version of "On the Road Again" with Willie Nelson, Hammack, and nine other Academy of Country Music nominees was published as "On the Road Again (ACM Lifting Lives Edition)" with proceeds from downloads to benefit a COVID-19 fund from ACM.

Hammack performed as part of C2C: Country to Country 2020 on March 6, 2020, and had her debut performance in Europe, performing at the Verti music hall in Berlin.

Hammack will release her second studio album, Bed of Roses, on March 7, 2025. It will be accompanied by the dual release of a book she co-authored with Carolyn Brown titled after the album.

== Influences ==
Hammack cites Kacey Musgraves, David Bowie, and Tom Waits as influences in her adult life.

== Personal life ==
In November 2020, Hammack purchased a home in Nashville that needed to be renovated.

== Discography ==
=== Albums ===
Title	Album details
If It Wasn't for You	Release date: August 14, 2020; Label: Capitol Nashville; Format: CD, digital download
Bed of Roses	Release date: March 7, 2025; Label: Capitol Nashville; Format: CD, digital download
"—" denotes releases that did not chart

=== Singles ===
Year	Single	Peak chart positions		Album
Year	Single	US Country	US Country Airplay	Album
2019	"Family Tree"	40	32	If It Wasn't for You
2020	"Just Friends"	—	—	If It Wasn't for You
"—" denotes releases that did not chart

=== Other charted songs and promotional singles ===
Year	Single	Peak chart positions	Album
Year	Single	US Country	Album
2019	"Fooled Around and Fell in Love" (Miranda Lambert featuring Maren Morris, Ashley McBryde, Tenille Townes, Caylee Hammack, and Elle King)	47	—N/a
2023	"All or Nothing"	—	—N/a
2023	"History of Repeating"	—	—N/a
2023	"That Dog"	—	—N/a
2024	"The Hill"	—	Bed of Roses
2024	"Breaking Dishes"	—	Bed of Roses
2025	"Bed of Roses"	—	Bed of Roses
"—" denotes releases that did not chart

=== Music videos ===
Video	Year	Director
"Family Tree"	2019	Dano Cerny
"Preciatcha"	2019	Corey Bost
"Small Town Hypocrite"	2020	Corey Bost
"Redhead"	2020	Justin Clough
"Forged in the Fire"	2020	Corey Bost
"The Hill"	2024	David O’Donahue
"Bed of Roses"	2025	Natalie Sakstrup
"No I Ain't"	2025	uncredited

== Awards and nominations ==
Year	Award show	Category	Nominated work	Result	References
2020	Academy of Country Awards	New Female Artist of the Year	Caylee Hammack	Nominated	
2020	Academy of Country Awards	Musical Event of the Year	"Fooled Around and Fell in Love" (with Miranda Lambert)	Won	
2020	AIMP Nashville Awards	Publisher's Pick	"Small Town Hypocrite"	Nominated	
2020	Country Music Association Awards	Musical Event of the Year	"Fooled Around and Fell in Love" (with Miranda Lambert)	Nominated	
2021	Academy of Country Awards	New Female Artist of the Year	Caylee Hammack	Nominated	
2023	CMT Music Awards	Video of the Year	"Bonfire at Tina's" (with Ashley McBryde, Brandy Clark and Pillbox Patti)	Longlisted	

- Hammack was named a "new country artist you need to know" by Rolling Stone in 2018.
- Hammack was featured as an emerging country artist by Billboard in 2019.
- Hammack was recognized by CMT Listen Up on its 2020 list, which was extended into 2021 in August.
