= Carly Pearce (album) =

Studio album by Carly Pearce
- Released: February 14, 2020
- Recorded: 2018–2019
- Genre: Country
- Length: 43:02
- Label: Big Machine
- Producer: busbee

Carly Pearce chronology
Every Little Thing (2017)	Carly Pearce (2020)	29 (2021)

Singles from Carly Pearce
- 1. "Closer to You" Released: November 2, 2018; 2. "I Hope You're Happy Now" Released: September 27, 2019

Carly Pearce is the self-titled second studio album by American country music artist Carly Pearce. The album was released on February 14, 2020.

== Commercial performance ==
Carly Pearce debuted at No. 6 on Top Country Albums, with 4,900 copies sold the first week. As of March 2020, the album has sold 6,800 copies, and 83,000 in units consumed.

== Singles ==
The album's lead single, "Closer to You" was released on November 2, 2018.

"I Hope You're Happy Now", a duet with fellow country singer Lee Brice, was released as Pearce's second single from the album on September 27, 2019.

=== Promotional singles ===
Four promotional singles were issued prior to the album's release. "It Won't Always Be Like This" was released on December 6, 2019, along with the announcement of her album title and tracklist, followed by "Call Me," "Heart's Going Out of Its Mind," and "You Kissed Me First" in January 2020.

== Track listing ==
Carly Pearce track listing
No.	Title	Writer(s)	Length
1.	"Closer to You"	Hillary Lindsey; Gordie Sampson; Troy Verges	3:07
2.	"Call Me"	busbee; Emily Shackelton; Phillip Sweet; Jimi Westbrook	3:42
3.	"I Hope You're Happy Now" (with Lee Brice)	Carly Pearce; Luke Combs; Randy Montana; Jonathan Singleton	3:18
4.	"Dashboard Jesus"	Shackelton; Victoria Banks; Sara Haze	3:11
5.	"Halfway Home"	Pearce; Jimmy Robbins; Laura Veltz	3:21
6.	"Heart's Going Out of Its Mind"	Pearce; Veltz; Joe Ginsberg	2:50
7.	"Finish Your Sentences" (with Michael Ray)	Kelsea Ballerini; Jesse Frasure; Ashley Gorley; Thomas Rhett	2:49
8.	"It Won't Always Be Like This"	Pearce; Sam Ellis; Natalie Hemby	3:44
9.	"Lightning in a Bottle"	Hannah Ellis; Anna Vaus	2:59
10.	"Love Has No Heart"	Haze; Shane McAnally; Trevor Rosen	3:39
11.	"Woman Down"	McAnally; Robbins; Veltz	3:02
12.	"You Kissed Me First"	Lindsey; Sampson; Josh Kear	3:16
13.	"Greener Grass"	Lindsey; Jonny Price; Ben West	4:04
Total length:			43:02

== Personnel ==
Adapted from liner notes.

- Lee Brice - duet vocals (track 3)
- busbee - Hammond B-3 organ (track 2), programming (tracks 1, 2), background vocals (track 7)
- Dave Cohen - keyboards (tracks 8–11)
- Ian Fitchuk - Hammond B-3 organ (track 1), keyboards (tracks 3–7, 12, 13), piano (tracks 1, 2), synthesizer (track 6)
- Jesse Frasure - programming (track 7)
- Mark Hill - bass guitar (all tracks)
- Trey Keller - background vocals (track 10)
- Hillary Lindsey - background vocals (tracks 1, 13)
- Josh Matheny - dobro (all tracks), steel guitar (tracks 1, 2, 4–6)
- Jerry McPherson - electric guitar (tracks 8–11)
- Carly Pearce - lead vocals (all tracks), background vocals (tracks 6, 7)
- Michael Ray - duet vocals (track 7)
- Jordan Reynolds - background vocals (tracks 2, 5, 8, 12)
- Jerry Roe - drums (tracks 8–11)
- Gordie Sampson - programming (tracks 1, 12)
- Savana Santos - background vocals (track 9)
- Aaron Sterling - drums (tracks 1–7, 12, 13), percussion (tracks 1, 2, 4–7)
- Russell Terrell - background vocals (tracks 1, 12)
- Ilya Toshinsky - acoustic guitar (all tracks), banjo (tracks 4, 6), mandolin (tracks 1, 2, 4, 7, 12)
- Mark Trussell - electric guitar (tracks 2, 13)
- Alison Veltz - background vocals (tracks 2, 4, 5)
- Laura Veltz - background vocals (tracks 5, 6, 11)
- Derek Wells - electric guitar (tracks 1–7, 12, 13)
- Ben West - keyboards (track 13), programming (track 13), synthesizer (track 6)

== Charts ==
=== Weekly charts ===
Chart performance for Carly Pearce
Chart (2020)	Peak position
Scottish Albums (Official Charts)	70
UK Country Albums (Official Charts)	3
US Billboard 200	73
US Top Country Albums (Billboard)	6

=== Year-end charts ===
Year-end chart performance for Carly Pearce
Chart (2020)	Position
US Top Country Albums (Billboard)	54

== See also ==
- List of 2020 albums
