= If It Wasn't for You =

2020 studio album by Caylee Hammack

Studio album by Caylee Hammack
- Released: August 14, 2020
- Recorded: 2018–2020
- Genre: Country
- Length: 40:52
- Label: Capitol Nashville
- Producer: Mikey Reaves; Connor Thuotte; Caylee Hammack

Caylee Hammack chronology
If It Wasn't for You (2020)	Bed of Roses (2025)

Singles from If It Wasn't For You
- 1. "Family Tree" Released: April 15, 2019; 2. "Just Friends" Released: September 21, 2020

If It Wasn't for You is the debut studio album by American country music singer and songwriter Caylee Hammack. It was released on August 14, 2020, through Capitol Nashville. Hammack co-wrote all the songs and co-produced the album with Mikey Reaves and Connor Thuotte.

== Track listing ==
No.	Title	Writer(s)	Producer(s)	Length
1.	"Just Friends"	Caylee Hammack; Mikey Reaves; Aaron Raitiere	Hammack; Reaves	2:50
2.	"Redhead" (featuring Reba McEntire)	Hammack; Natalie Hemby; Trent Dabbs	Hammack; Reaves	2:43
3.	"Looking for a Lighter"	Hammack; Hillary Lindsey; Gordie Sampson	Hammack; Reaves	3:03
4.	"Preciatcha"	Hammack; Jordan Schmidt; Laura Veltz	Hammack; Reaves	3:01
5.	"Sister"	Hammack; April Geesbreght; Blake Bollinger	Hammack; Reaves	3:20
6.	"Just Like You"	Hammack; Blake Hubbard; Jarrod Ingram	Hammack; Reaves	3:27
7.	"King Size Bed"	Hammack; Sampson; Tawgs Salter; Troy Verges	Hammack; Reaves	3:07
8.	"Forged in the Fire"	Hammack; Andy Skib; Thomas Finchum	Hammack; Reaves	3:15
9.	"Family Tree"	Hammack; Sampson; Verges	Hammack; Reaves	3:30
10.	"Mean Something" (featuring Ashley McBryde and Tenille Townes)	Hammack; Reaves	Hammack; Reaves	3:14
11.	"Small Town Hypocrite"	Hammack; Jared Scott	Hammack; Reaves	4:02
12.	"Gold"	Hammack	Hammack; Reaves	1:46
13.	"New Level of Life"	Hammack; Reaves; Raitiere; Connor Thuotte	Hammack; Reaves; Thuotte	3:30
Total length:				40:52

== Release history ==
Region	Date	Format(s)	Label	Ref.
Worldwide	August 14, 2020	CD; digital download	Capitol Nashville	
