= Wild (Ashley McBryde album) =

Studio album by Ashley McBryde
- Released: May 8, 2026
- Recorded: 2025–2026
- Studio: Pine Box Studio
- Genre: Country; country rock
- Length: 39:00
- Label: Warner Nashville
- Producer: John Osborne

Ashley McBryde chronology
The Devil I Know (2023)	Wild (2026)

Singles from Wild
- 1. "What If We Don't" Released: February 23, 2026

Wild is the fifth studio album by American country music singer-songwriter Ashley McBryde. It was released on May 8, 2026, by Warner Music Nashville. It was preceded by the lead single "What If We Don't", and promotional singles "Rattlesnake Preacher", "Arkansas Mud", and "Bottle Tells Me So". The album sees McBryde re-team with producer John Osborne, whom she worked with on her third project Lindeville (2022), and was recorded live with her touring band Deadhorse. Thematically, the album traces a narrative that builds toward the moment just before McBryde gave up drinking, exploring themes of identity, upbringing and personal reckoning. Drawing on her roots in the Ozark Mountains of Arkansas and the lasting impact of her fundamentalist background, the record also confronts the realities of addiction, generational trauma and the journey toward sobriety.

== Background ==
On June 26, 2025, McBryde released "Rattlesnake Preacher", a long-time fan-favorite track that had appeared in her live sets for several years prior. McBryde stated that, "we’ve constantly been asked by fans when it’ll make it onto a record. As we were gearing up for my second year of co-hosting CMA Fest, it felt like the perfect time to finally get this one out there. It’s my way of saying thank you to the fans who have shown up, listened and gave this song life long before it was ever recorded." A music video for the song was subsequently released on August 28, 2025.

"Arkansas Mud" was released as a promotional single on February 20, 2026. Of the song, McBryde explained, "we’ve all filed an edge down here or there at someone else’s request. ‘Arkansas Mud’ is about rediscovering and re-honing those edges."

McBryde released "What If We Don't", the lead single from her then-untitled upcoming fifth studio album, on February 23, 2026.

Teasing the upcoming album on Instagram, McBryde posted, "sometimes going with your gut is the scariest thing you can do… and the most necessary. This record felt like building a tree fort from some pieces we’d been needing to put to good use and some building materials I had to go scout out and look for. And piece by piece, trusting it would all hold together in the end. I’m so ready for y’all to hear it."

The album was announced on March 19, 2026. Of the project, McBryde stated, "when people hear this record, I hope it wakes up the part of them that I’m singing about in Wild—the part that still believes in those unrealized dreams and untaken risks. I believe that wild little kid is still alive inside of all of us, and that’s the version of everyone that I want to sing to." Osborne added, "Ashley McBryde is a rare gem. There are people out there with natural ability and there are people that dedicate every waking hour to honing their craft. Ashley is both. Never settling. Always reaching. The perfect combination of vulnerable and fearless." The album's third promotional single, "Bottle Tells Me So", dropped the following day.

== Track listing ==
No.	Title	Writer(s)	Length
1.	"Rattlesnake Preacher"	Randall Clay	3:56
2.	"Arkansas Mud"	Ashley McBryde; Jessie Jo Dillon; Chris Tompkins	4:18
3.	"Water in the River"	Clay; Blue Foley; Roger Hodges	3:02
4.	"Creosote"	McBryde; Lisa Carver	2:49
5.	"Bottle Tells Me So"	McBryde; Terri Jo Box; Shelly Fairchild	3:20
6.	"What If We Don't"	McBryde; Box; Clay	3:06
7.	"Lines in the Carpet"	Lauren Hungate; Lori McKenna; Caroline Watkins	3:24
8.	"Behind Bars"	Jessi Alexander; Jeff Hyde; Jon Randall	3:41
9.	"Hand Me Downs"	McBryde; Dillon; Lauren Veltz	3:51
10.	"Wild"	Matraca Berg; Makayla Lynn; Jeremy Spillman	4:32
11.	"Ten to Midnight"	McBryde; Travis Meadows	3:12
Total length:			39:00

== Personnel ==
Credits adapted from Tidal.

=== Musicians ===
- Ashley McBryde – lead vocals (all tracks), acoustic guitar (tracks 1–5, 7–11), background vocals (2–5, 7–11)
- John Osborne – electric guitar, percussion (all tracks); background vocals, banjo, claps, Clavinet, synthesizer (2–5, 7–11); hi-string guitar, Mellotron, Moog (6)
- Chris Harris – acoustic guitar, background vocals (all tracks); 12-string guitar, mandolin (2–5, 7–11)
- Caleb Hooper – bass (all tracks); background vocals, claps (2–5, 7–11)
- Shelly Fairchild – background vocals (1–5, 7–11), claps (2–5, 7–11)
- Matt Helmkamp – electric guitar (1, 6); claps, drums, percussion (2–5, 7–11); vocals (4)
- Wes Dorethy – fiddle (1–5, 7–11); claps, Hammond B3 organ, harmonica, Mellotron, piano (2–5, 7–11)
- Billy Justineau – Hammond B3 organ (1–5, 7–11), Moog (1)
- Quinn Hill – drums (1, 6), background vocals (1), percussion (6)
- Matt Combs – violin, viola, cello (2–5, 7–11)

=== Technical ===
- John Osborne – production, recording
- Dave Salley – recording (1–4, 6)
- Logan Hanna – recording (1, 6), recording assistance (2–5, 7–11)
- Justin Francis – recording (5, 7–11)
- Josh Moore – digital editing
- Adam Hawkins – mixing
- Andrew Mendelson – mastering
- Alyson McAnally – production coordination

== Charts ==
Chart performance for Wild
Chart (2026)	Peak position
Scottish Albums (OCC)	12
UK Albums Sales (OCC)	19
UK Americana Albums (OCC)	4
UK Country Albums (OCC)	1
US Americana/Folk Albums (Billboard)	21
US Top Album Sales (Billboard)	21
