= Never Will: Live from a Distance =

EP by Ashley McBryde
- Released: May 28, 2021
- Genre: Country
- Length: 21:13
- Label: Warner Nashville

Ashley McBryde chronology
Never Will (2020)	Never Will: Live from a Distance (2021)	Lindeville (2022)

Never Will: Live from a Distance is an extended play (EP) by American country singer-songwriter Ashley McBryde. It was released on May 28, 2021, via Warner Music Nashville and contained six tracks. The EP was released to substitute for McBryde's absence from touring during the COVID-19 pandemic. It was McBryde's second EP released in her music career.

== Background, content, and release ==
In 2020, Ashley McBryde released her second studio album titled Never Will. Although critically acclaimed, she was not able to tour or promote the record due to the COVID-19 pandemic, which shut down any plans for touring. "We released Never Will on April 3 last year, so we went straight from rehearsals for a tour to not seeing each other in person for months," she explained. The album included six tracks originally released on Never Will. According to McBryde, the live songs were recorded like they would sound on tour. "Getting together to rehearse and record these live versions safely was our way of giving the fans a taste of what they would have seen had the world not changed so much," she explained in a press statement.

The six tracks on the EP were all recorded live. Except the second track "Shut Up Sheila", all songs were co-composed by McBryde herself. Also included was "Martha Divine", a song released as a single off her 2020 studio album. At the time of the EP's release, the studio version of the song was a single at country radio. Never Will: Live from a Distance was released on May 28, 2021, on Warner Music Nashville. It was available to digital and streaming sites upon its release. A concert was included as part of the promotional package of the album. The concert premiered on McBryde's official YouTube channel.

== Track listing ==
Never Will: Live from a Distance track listing
No.	Title	Writer(s)	Length
1.	"First Thing I Reach For"	Randall Clay; Mick Holland; Ashley McBryde	3:11
2.	"Shut Up Sheila"	Nicolette Hayford; Charles Chisholm	3:40
3.	"Velvet Red"	McBryde; Patrick Savage; Daniel Smalley	3:26
4.	"Voodoo Doll"	Brandy Clark; Connie Harrington; Hayford; McBryde; Jake Mitchell; Aaron Raitiere	3:29
5.	"Martha Divine"	McBryde; Jeremy Spillman	3:36
6.	"Sparrow"	Clark; Harrington; McBryde; Hayford; Mitchell; Raitiere	3:51
Total length:			21:13

== Personnel ==
All credits are adapted from AllMusic.

Musical personnel

- Chris Harris – Background vocals, guitar
- Mark Helmkamp – Background vocals, guitar
- Quinn Hill – Drums
- Ashley McBryde – Guitar, lead vocals
- Christian Sancho – Bass

Technical personnel

- Logan Hanna – Engineering, mixing
- Courtney Warner – Digital recording engineer, editing, mixing engineer
- Terry Watson – Mastering

== Release history ==
Release history and formats for Never Will: Live from a Distance
Region	Date	Format	Label	Ref.
North America	May 28, 2021	Digital	Warner Music Nashville	
