= Closer to You (Carly Pearce song) =

Single by Carly Pearce

from the album Carly Pearce
- Released: November 2, 2018
- Genre: Country
- Length: 3:07
- Label: Big Machine
- Songwriter(s): Hillary Lindsey; Gordie Sampson; Troy Verges
- Producer(s): busbee

Carly Pearce singles chronology
"Hide the Wine" (2017)	"Closer to You" (2018)	"I Hope You're Happy Now" (2019)

"Closer to You" is a song recorded by American country music singer Carly Pearce. It was released in November 2018 as the first single from her self-titled second studio album. The song was written by Hillary Lindsey, Gordie Sampson and Troy Verges.

== Charts ==
=== Weekly charts ===
Chart (2018–2019)	Peak position
Canada Country (Billboard)	43
US Country Airplay (Billboard)	28
US Hot Country Songs (Billboard)	33

=== Year-end charts ===
Chart (2019)	Position
US Hot Country Songs (Billboard)	83

== Certifications ==
Region	Certification	Certified units/sales
United States (RIAA)	Gold	500,000^{‡}
^{‡} Sales+streaming figures based on certification alone.
