= Family Tree (Caylee Hammack song) =

Single by Caylee Hammack

from the album If It Wasn't for You
- Released: April 15, 2019
- Genre: Country
- Length: 3:30
- Label: Capitol Nashville
- Songwriters: Caylee Hammack; Gordie Sampson; Troy Verges
- Producers: Caylee Hammack; Mikey Reaves

Caylee Hammack singles chronology
"Family Tree" (2019)	"Just Friends" (2020)

Music video
- "Family Tree" on YouTube

"Family Tree" is a song by American country music singer Caylee Hammack. It was released on April 15, 2019, as Hammack's debut single to country radio. It served as the lead to her debut studio album, If It Wasn't for You (2020). Hammack co-wrote the song with Gordie Sampson and Troy Verges, and co-produced it with Mikey Reaves.

== Content ==
Hammack co-wrote "Family Tree" with Gordie Sampson and Troy Verges. It was the first song written for her debut album and the first song she ever produced herself, working on it with Mikey Reaves. Hammack described it as an autobiographical song that describes where she comes from and "tell[s] the story of the people that she knows and loves best".

== Music video ==
The music video for "Family Tree" premiered on April 14, 2019. It was directed by Dano Cerny and features cameos by many of Hammack's family and friends, including her parents and sister, Mollie, as well as Mikey Reaves who co-produced the song.

== Charts ==
Weekly chart performance for "Family Tree"
Chart (2019–2020)	Peak position
US Country Airplay (Billboard)	32
US Hot Country Songs (Billboard)	40
