= Carolyn Brown (author) =

American novelist

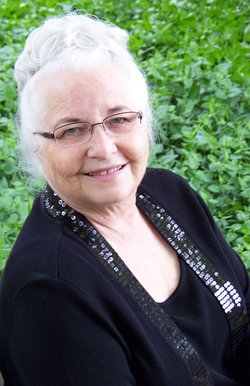
- Born: October 22, 1948 (age 77) Whitewright, Texas, U.S.
- Occupation: Author
- Genres: Romance; women's fiction

Website
- www.carolynbrownbooks.com

Carolyn Louise Brown (born October 22, 1948) is an American author of romance and women's fiction. She has written more than 100 novels, 8 novellas, and has contributed to multiple anthologies.

== Biography ==
Carolyn Brown was born in Whitewright, Texas, on October 22, 1948, and raised in Tishomingo, Oklahoma. She sold her first two books to Kensington Publishing Company in 1997.

Brown's books have sold more than 6 million copies. She is a New York Times, USA Today, Publishers Weekly and Wall Street Journal bestselling author. Her books have also been reviewed by USA Today and Publishers Weekly. Brown has been published by Sourcebooks, Montlake Romance, Avalon Books, Kensington, and Grand Central. In 2012, she was nominated for the RITA Award for Best Inspirational Romance for The Ladies Room. In 2020, Brown was a HOLT Medallion finalist for Novel with Romantic Elements for The Family Journal.

Brown now writes full time in Davis, Oklahoma, where she lives with her husband.

== Bibliography ==
=== Romance ===
==== Standalone titles ====
- This Time Forever (Kensington, 1997)
- Love is the Answer (Kensington, 1997)
- Winning Angel (Kensington, 1998)
- For the Love of Mercy (Kensington, 1999)
- Love Is (Avalon, 1999)
- A Falling Star (Avalon, 2000)
- The Yard Rose (Avalon, 2000)
- All the Way from Texas (Avalon, 2000)
- Lily’s White Lace (Avalon, 2001)
- The Ivy Tree (Avalon, 2001)
- That Way Again (Avalon, 2003)
- The Wager (Avalon, 2004)
- The Dove (Avalon, 2004)
- Trouble in Paradise (Montlake, 2005)
- The PMS Club (Avalon, 2006)
- Talk Cowboy To Me (Sourcebooks, 2017)
- Bride for a Day (Vintage Publishing, 2014)
- An Old Love’s Shadow (Vintage Publishing, 2014)
- Red River Deep (Vintage Publishing, 2014)
- Honky Tonk Angel (Vintage Publishing, 2014)
- Small Town Romance Collection (Vintage Publishing, 2017)

==== Series ====
- The Broken Roads Series
  - To Trust (Avalon, 2008)
  - To Commit (Avalon, 2008)
  - To Believe (Avalon, 2009)
  - To Dream (Avalon, 2009)
  - To Hope (Avalon, 2009)
- The Three Magic Words Series
  - A Forever Thing (Avalon, 2011)
  - In Shining Whatever (Avalon, 2012)
  - Live After Wife (Montlake Romance, 2013)
- The Oklahoma Land Rush Series
  - Emma’s Folly (Avalon, 2002)
  - Violet's Wish (Avalon, 2002)
  - Maggie’s Mistake (Avalon, 2002)
  - Just Grace (Avalon, 2003)
- The Promised Land Series
  - Willow (Avalon, 2003)
  - Velvet (Avalon, 2003)
  - Gypsy (Avalon, 2004)
  - Garnet (Avalon, 2004)
  - Augusta (Avalon, 2004)
- The Black Swan Series
  - Pushin' Up Daisies (Avalon, 2009)
  - From Thin Air (Avalon, 2009)
  - Come High Water (Avalon, 2010)
- The Drifters & Dreamers Series
  - Morning Glory (Avalon, 2007)
  - Sweet Tilly (Avalon, 2007)
  - Evening Star (Avalon, 2007)
- The Angels & Outlaws Series
  - From Wine to Water (Avalon, 2010)
  - Walkin' On Clouds (Avalon, 2011)
  - A Trick of the Light (Avalon, 2011)
- The Love's Valley Series
  - Choices (Avalon, 2005)
  - Absolution (Avalon, 2005)
  - Chances (Avalon, 2005)
  - Redemption (Avalon, 2006)
  - Promises (Avalon, 2006)
- Spikes & Spurs Cowboy Series
  - Love Drunk Cowboy (Sourcebooks, 2011)
  - Red's Hot Cowboy (Sourcebooks, 2011)
  - Darn Good Cowboy Christmas (Sourcebooks, 2011)
  - One Hot Cowboy Wedding (Sourcebooks, 2012)
  - Mistletoe Cowboy (Sourcebooks, 2012)
  - Just a Cowboy and His Baby (Sourcebooks, 2012)
  - Cowboy Seeks Bride (Sourcebooks, 2013)
  - Christmas at Home (Sourcebooks, 2020)
- Cowboys & Brides Series Cowboy Series
  - The Billion Dollar Cowboy (Sourcebooks, 2013)
  - The Cowboy’s Christmas Baby (Sourcebooks, 2013)
  - The Cowboy’s Mail Order Bride (Sourcebooks, 2014)
  - How to Marry a Cowboy (Sourcebooks, 2014)
- The Canyon Series
  - Long, Hot Texas Summer (Montlake Romance, 2014)
  - Daisies in the Canyon (Montlake Romance, 2014)
- The Honky Tonk Series
  - I Love This Bar (Sourcebooks, 2010)
  - Hell, Yeah (Sourcebooks, 2010)
  - My Give a Damn's Busted (Sourcebooks, 2010)
  - Honky Tonk Christmas (Sourcebooks, 2010)
  - A Slow Dance Holiday (Sourcebooks, 2020)
- The Lucky Series
  - Lucky in Love (Sourcebooks, 2009)
  - One Lucky Cowboy (Sourcebooks, 2009)
  - Getting Lucky (Sourcebooks, 2010)
- The Lucky Penny Ranch Series
  - Wild Cowboy Ways (Grand Central, 2015)
  - Hot Cowboy Nights (Grand Central, 2015)
  - Merry Cowboy Christmas (Grand Central, 2016)
  - Wicked Cowboy Charm (Grand Central, 2017)
- The Burnt Boot Cowboy Series
  - Cowboy Boots for Christmas (Cowboy not Included), (Sourcebooks, 2014)
  - The Trouble with Texas Cowboys (Sourcebooks, 2015)
  - One Texas Cowboy Too Many (Sourcebooks, 2016)
  - The Cowboy's Christmas Miracle (Sourcebooks, 2016)
- The Happy, Texas Cowboy Series
  - The Toughest Cowboy in Texas (Grand Central, 2017)
  - Long, Tall Cowboy Christmas (Grand Central, 2017)
  - The Luckiest Cowboy in Texas (Grand Central, 2018)
- The Longhorn Canyon Cowboy Series
  - Cowboy Bold (Grand Central, 2018)
  - Cowboy Honor (Grand Central, 2018)
  - Cowboy Brave (Grand Central, 2019)
  - Cowboy Rebel (Grand Central, 2019)
  - Christmas With a Cowboy (Grand Central, 2019)
  - Cowboy Courage (Grand Central, 2020)
  - Cowboy Strong (Forever, 2020)
- The Ryan Family Series
  - Second Chance at Sunflower Ranch (Forever, 2021)

=== Women's fiction ===
==== Standalone titles ====
- The Ladies' Room (Avalon, 2011)
- Hidden Secrets (Montlake Romance, 2012)
- The Wedding Pearls (Montlake Romance, 2015)
- The Lullaby Sky (Montlake Romance, 2016)
- The Barefoot Summer (Montlake Romance, 2017)
- The Lilac Bouquet (Montlake Romance, 2017)
- The Strawberry Hearts Diner (Montlake Romance, 2017)
- The Sometimes Sisters (Montlake Romance, 2018)
- Small Town Rumors (Montlake Romance, 2018)
- The Magnolia Inn (Montlake Romance, 2019)
- The Perfect Dress (Montlake Romance, 2019)
- The Empty Nesters (Montlake Romance, 2019)
- The Family Journal (Montlake Romance, 2019)
- The Banty House (Montlake, 2020)
- Miss Janie's Girls (Montlake, 2020)
- The Daydream Cabin (Montlake, 2020)
- Hummingbird Land (Montlake, 2021)
- The Hope Chest (Montlake, 2021)

==== The Cadillac Series ====
- The Blue Ribbon Jalapeno Society Jubilee (Sourcebooks, 2014)
- The Red Hot Chili Cook Off (Sourcebooks, 2014)
- The Yellow Rose Beauty Shop (Montlake Romance, 2015)

=== Anthologies ===
- The Night Before Christmas (Grand Central, 2018) (with stories by Katy Lane, Debbie Mason, Annie Rains and Hope Ramsey)
- A Little Country Christmas (Forever, 2020) (with stories by Rochelle Alers, Hope Ramsay, A. J. Pine)

=== Novellas ===
- To Catch a Bouquet (Montlake, 2015)
- The Third Wish (Vintage Publishing 2017)
- Wildflower Ranch (Forever Yours, 2020)
- Sunrise Ranch (Forever Yours, 2020)
- The Wedding Gift (Audible, 2020)
- A Chance Inheritance (Audible, 2020)
- Summertime on the Ranch (Sourcebooks, 2021)
- Small Town Charm (Forever Yours, 2021)
