= Girl Goin' Nowhere =

Single by Ashley McBryde

from the album Girl Going Nowhere
- Released: January 14, 2019
- Genre: Country
- Length: 3:25
- Label: Warner Music Nashville
- Songwriters: Jeremy Bussey; Ashley McBryde
- Producer: Jay Joyce

Ashley McBryde singles chronology
"Radioland" (2018)	"Girl Goin' Nowhere" (2019)	"One Night Standards" (2019)

"Girl Goin' Nowhere" is a song recorded by American country music singer Ashley McBryde. It was released originally on McBryde's album of the same name in 2018. In January 2019, it was released as the album's third single, and reached the top 40 of the Country Airplay chart later that year. It received positive reviews from critics.

== Background ==
"Girl Goin' Nowhere" was co-written by Ashley McBryde, along with Jeremy Bussey. It was McBryde's first experience working with Bussey, who had previously written for country artists like Jason Aldean and Luke Bryan. Bussey encouraged her to write a song "in such a way that Guy Clark wouldn’t be upset if he had to listen to it." McBryde was also inspired to write the song based on an experience she had with her high school algebra teacher. McBryde had told the educator that she planned on becoming a singer-songwriter. The teacher replied by saying that her dream was "stupid" and that she needed a back-up plan. "For an educator to tell a kid that their dream is stupid, that is so ridiculous and most educators would never do that. But in all reality she gave me my first experience with rejection and the word 'no'," she explained in 2018.

Garth Brooks covered the song under a revised title of "Guy Goin' Nowhere" for his Triple Live album.

== Critical reception ==
The song received positive reviews from critics. This included Stephen Thomas Erlewine of AllMusic who named it among his "album picks" upon reviewing her 2018 album of the same name. Roughstock called it a "reflective song" and commented that "McBryde also sounds grateful for these struggles, as it’s these hard times that build the most character." Billy Dukes of Taste of Country called the track "inspiring reminder to chase your dreams."

== Release and chart performance ==
"Girl Goin' Nowhere" was first included as the title track to McBryde's debut studio album. Produced by Jay Joyce, the album was released on March 30, 2018, via Warner Music Nashville. The song was released as a single on January 14, 2019, via Warner Music. The song spent a total of 22 weeks on the Billboard Country Airplay chart, peaking at number 40 in May 2019. It was McBryde's second top 40 single in her music career. A live music video directed by Ryan McElmore was released on Country Music Television in 2019.

== Charts ==
2019 chart performance for "Girl Goin' Nowhere"
Chart (2019)	Peak position
US Country Airplay (Billboard)	40

2025 chart performance for "Girl Goin' Nowhere"
Chart (2025)	Peak position
UK Singles Sales (OCC)	73
