= A Little Dive Bar in Dahlonega =

Single by Ashley McBryde

from the album Girl Going Nowhere
- Released: October 16, 2017
- Genre: Country
- Length: 3:29
- Label: Warner Bros. Nashville
- Songwriters: Ashley McBryde, Nicolette Hayford, Jesse Rice
- Producer: Jay Joyce

Ashley McBryde singles chronology
"A Little Dive Bar in Dahlonega" (2017)	"Radioland" (2018)

"A Little Dive Bar in Dahlonega" is a song co-written and recorded by American country music artist Ashley McBryde. The song was released as her first single on October 16, 2017, and served as the lead-off single to her major label debut album, Girl Going Nowhere, released on Warner Bros. Nashville.

== Content ==
McBryde co-wrote the song with Nicolette Hayford and Jesse Rice, the latter of which drew inspiration for the song based on a real life experience in which he met the woman that would become his wife by chance at a dive bar known as The Crimson Moon in the town of Dahlonega, Georgia after his car broke down leaving Atlanta. The song was written on a day McBryde calls "the worst day ever," a sentiment shared by the other two songwriters when they met up for a writing session, which led to Rice sharing the story that would lead to the creation of the song.

"A Little Dive Bar in Dahlonega" was named one of the 54 Best Songs of 2017 by The New York Times, and one of the Top 25 Best Country Songs of 2017 by Rolling Stone.

== Chart performance ==
"A Little Dive Bar in Dahlonega" debuted on the Billboard Country Airplay chart at number 59 on the chart dated December 12, 2017.

=== Weekly charts ===
Chart (2017–2018)	Peak position
Canada Country (Billboard)	45
US Country Airplay (Billboard)	30
US Hot Country Songs (Billboard)	30

=== Year-end charts ===
Chart (2018)	Position
US Hot Country Songs (Billboard)	93

== Certifications ==
Region	Certification	Certified units/sales
United States (RIAA)	Gold	500,000^{‡}
^{‡} Sales+streaming figures based on certification alone.
