= Martha Divine =

Single by Ashley McBryde

from the album Never Will
- Released: October 19, 2020
- Genre: Country
- Length: 3:50
- Label: Warner Music Nashville
- Songwriters: Ashley McBryde; Jeremy Spillman
- Producer: Jay Joyce

Ashley McBryde singles chronology
"One Night Standards" (2019)	"Martha Divine" (2020)	"Never Wanted to Be That Girl" (2021)

"Martha Divine" is a song recorded by American country singer–songwriter Ashley McBryde. The song was released as a single in October 2020, becoming the second release spawned from her second studio album Never Will. McBryde wrote the song with Jeremy Spillman. The song received positive reviews from critics following its release.

== Background and recording ==
"Martha Divine" was co-written by Ashley McBryde and Jeremy Spillman. The song's central concept is centered around a daughter who is angry that her mother is being cheated on. McBryde told Spillman that she wanted a song similar in theme to that of Dolly Parton's "Jolene". "Instead of singing ‘Jolene, Jolene, Jolene, Jolene, please don’t take my man.’ What if we said, ‘Jolene, Jolene, Jolene, Jolene, I’m coming after you with a shovel.'," she told CMT. McBryde originally recorded the demo version of the song with a "circus-y" sound. However, once in the studio, producer Jay Joyce brought in a lead guitar and had drums included. "This is going to be a song that hopefully, someday, when you are playing it live, two measures of that drum introduction and people will start cheering," Joyce told her.

== Critical reception ==
"Martha Divine" has received positive reception since its release. Billy Dukes of Taste of Country commented that "Ashley McBryde carries on the great country tradition of giving bad men what they deserve in her new song "Martha Divine." Only in this case, he gets to live knowing his loose trousers led to a wanton woman's demise." Rolling Stone's Stephen L. Betts described it as a "dark revenge tune". Stephen Thompson of NPR commented that "What 'Martha Divine' lacks in healthy boundaries, appropriately placed anger or clarity about the proper legal definition of "murder," however, it more than makes up for in raucous, hooky, fist-pumping catharsis."

== Release and music video ==
"Martha Divine" first appeared as an album track on McBryde's second studio album titled Never Will. On October 19, 2020, it was released as a single to country radio via Warner Music Nashville. The song followed her top 20 country single "One Night Standards". The song spent two weeks on the Billboard Country Airplay chart, peaking at number 59 in April 2021. A music video was released prior to the single itself. The video was directed by Reid Long.

== Track listing ==
Digital single

- "Martha Divine" – 3:50

== Charts ==
Chart performance for "Martha Divine"
Chart (2020–21)	Peak position
US Country Airplay (Billboard)	59
