= Lindeville =

Studio album by Ashley McBryde
- Released: September 30, 2022
- Genre: Country
- Length: 33:42
- Label: Warner Music Nashville
- Producer: John Osborne; John Peets

Ashley McBryde chronology
| Never Will: Live from a Distance (2021) | Lindeville (2022) | The Devil I Know (2023) |

Lindeville, also referred to as Ashley McBryde Presents: Lindeville, is the third major label release by American country music singer-songwriter Ashley McBryde, released on September 30, 2022, by Warner Music Nashville. Recorded concurrently with her fourth major label record, Lindeville is a concept album centering on a fictional town that is home to the various characters that appear in McBryde's songs and is named in tribute to famous songwriter Dennis Linde. The album was produced by John Osborne, McBryde's close personal friend and member of the duo Brothers Osborne and features a close circle of McBryde and Osborne's collaborators. The album was nominated for Best Country Album at the 65th Annual Grammy Awards, and was also included in the top ten of critic Robert Christgau's Dean's List for 2022.

== Writing and recording ==
Following the release of her sophomore album Never Will and its associated live album Live from a Distance, McBryde began work on her next project. In an interview with Rolling Stone, she stated that the album initially grew from a songwriting exercise with her friends, explaining that "a few years ago, Aaron Raitiere, Nicolette Hayford and I were on a write. We wrote this song called "Blackout Betty" and I realized we had written previous songs called "Shut Up Sheila" on Never Will and "Livin' Next to Leroy" on Girl Going Nowhere. Aaron had a song called "Jesus, Jenny" and I thought, 'We should keep these characters together and give them a place to live!'" Describing the creation of the album, McBryde explained "I wanted to lock six writers in a house and just spend six or seven days writing. We stayed in Tennessee in this little house close to a lake. It was eight bottles of tequila, two cartons of cigarettes, one kitchen table and six individuals out of their minds."

McBryde's third studio album, The Devil I Know, had already been completed when she created Lindeville and she submitted both albums to her label simultaneously, stating "I hadn't told anybody that we'd made the Lindeville record! Warner was aware that I was up to something and working on the 'other' record. [...] What everyone was expecting was my 'proper' third record so I'm putting out Lindeville first, which I probably shouldn't be allowed to do for my third album because it's more a 5th or 6th album project. My thinking is that if we shouldn't be allowed to do a record like 'Lindeville' this early in a career then that's the exact reason why we should!"

=== Title ===
Lindeville is named after American songwriter Dennis Linde who was famous for his character-driven narratives including "Goodbye Earl", "Goodbye Marie", "Bubba Shot the Jukebox", "Janie Baker's Love Slave" and "John Deere Green". Explaining how she developed the concept, McBryde explained "we did it kind of differently. We had characters and then invented ... a town, so we thought it would be the best way to tip our hats and honor Dennis Linde's genius, but be like, 'Here's our characters and I would love it if where they lived was named Lindeville. [Linde] drew a map of a town that was completely fictional, developed characters that live inside that town. The water tower literally says on it, 'Billy Bob and Charlene' on the map. Then we wrote songs based on these places and individuals that he was creating in this town."

=== Collaborators ===
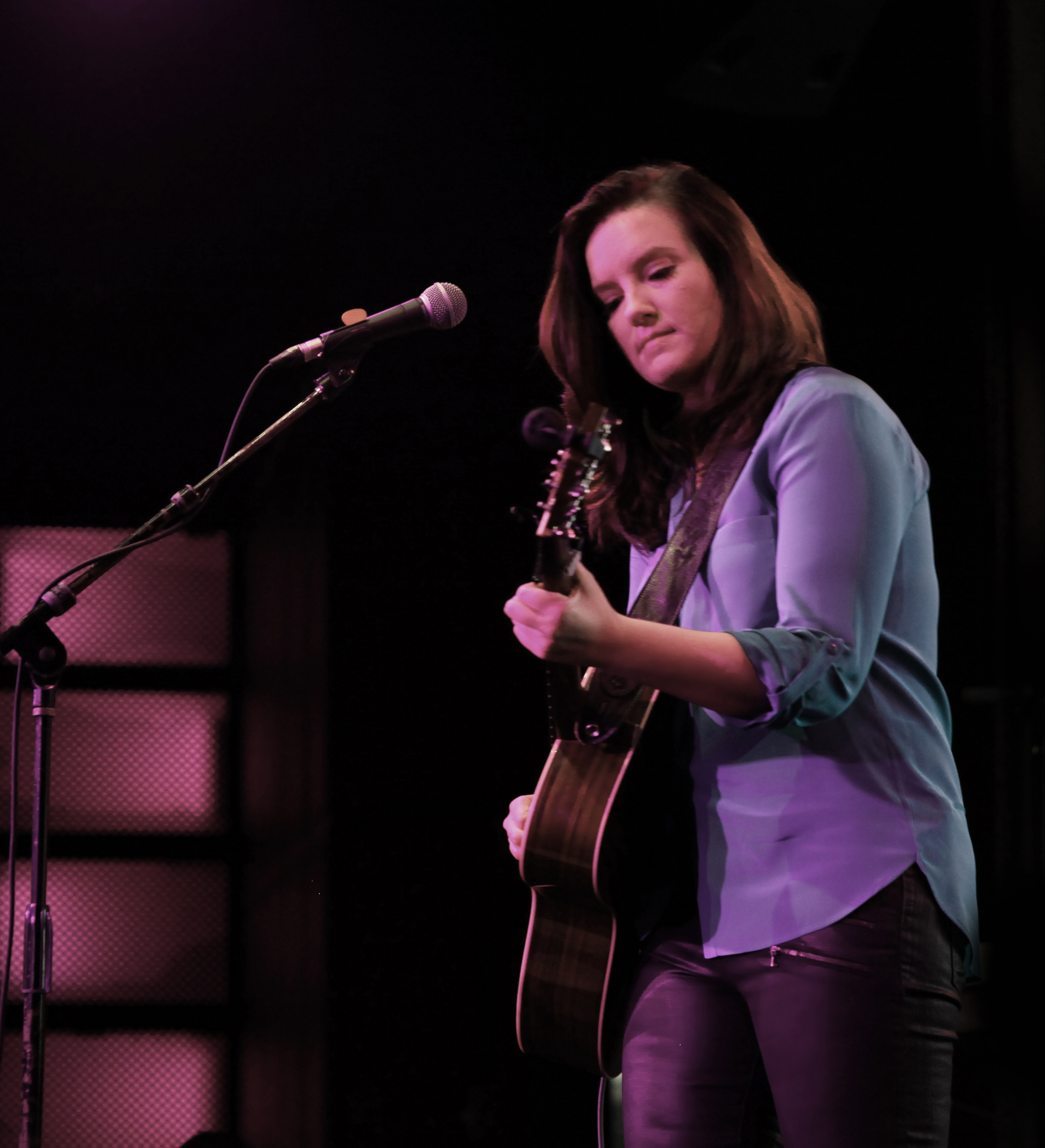
Brandy Clark co-wrote all twelve of the album's original songs and appears as a vocalist on three tracks.

The album features a close circle of collaborators who work alongside McBryde: John Osborne, guitarist and member of Brothers Osborne on production, Osborne's brother and fellow member of Brothers Osborne TJ, Caylee Hammack, Brandy Clark and Nicolette Hayford (as her alter ego Pillbox Patti) on vocals, and songwriters Aaron Raitiere, Connie Harrington and Benjy Davis. All thirteen songs on the album were written by McBryde, Raitiere, Hayford, Harrington, Davis and Clark, with exception of "Jesus Jenny" which was written by Raitiere and Jon Deccious, and a cover of The Everly Brothers' "When Will I Be Loved". McBryde had known and worked with eight of the nine key collaborators previously but was introduced to Davis by Hayford during the writer's retreat where the album was written. McBryde explained "normally when I plan a writer's retreat it's me, Nicolette Hayford, Aaron Raitiere and Connie Harrington that get together. Anytime Brandy Clark is available she's always my first go-to. Even when she's not available I still call her anyway! So it was wonderful that she was available this time around. I asked Nicolette to bring me someone I'd never met before. I was like, 'Bring us a bottle of hot sauce to throw into the mix!', you know? Nicolette brought in the wonderful Benjy Davis. That's how the gang got together."

=== Production ===
McBryde stated that Osborne was her first choice to produce the album, stating "I love John's mind. I knew he would 'get' it, I knew he wouldn't just 'slick it up' and make it as mainstream as possible. We had taken such care in writing the songs and the lyrics and John was able to match that with his brilliance and his creative spirit."

Regarding his work on the album, Osborne explained "This is technically the first full-length album that I've produced by myself. One of the things I tried to do was capture each character as a performance. I listened to each song, and I wrestled with it for a while. Do I want to make the songs sound the same? Make it sound like it's all done in one room on one day? And then I thought to myself, 'Each song has to represent not only a different character, but a different emotion and a different story.' There is certainly continuity between the tracks – we have vocalists and mostly the same musicians on every song. But I decided to take different approaches to each song because it needed to represent the story." In an Instagram post promoting the album, he explained "I listened to the worktapes for weeks as a genuine fan. Every human emotion is strung up in these songs."

== Marketing ==
The album was officially announced on September 9, 2022. McBryde and Brothers Osborne teased the release by posting a cryptic video clip on social media featuring a blonde girl in a red dress playing an accordion in front of letters reading "Lindeville" with the caption 9.30 in reference to the album's release date. McBryde and Caylee Hammack further teased the project by posting videos of themselves reading amusing and eccentric articles from the "Lindeville Gazette". On September 24, McBryde and Hammack posted clips featuring English and American broadcasters Bob Harris and Storme Warren as hosts of Lindeville's "What the Fuzz" radio station teasing the songs "Jesus Jenny" and "Brenda Put Your Bra On" respectively.

McBryde, Clark, Hammack, Patti and Osborne performed "When Will I Be Loved" at the 56th Annual Country Music Association Awards on November 9, 2022.

McBryde promoted the album with two shows at the Ryman Auditorium on February 15 and 16, 2023 alongside Brothers Osborne, Caylee Hammack, Aaron Raitiere, Benjy Davis and Pillbox Patti. Shelly Fairchild filled in for Brandy Clark, who was unable to attend, while Lainey Wilson filled in for Hammack on the second night.

== Critical reception ==
Professional ratings
Review scores
| Source | Rating |
|---|---|
| AllMusic | 4.5/5 stars |
| And It Don't Stop | A |

Lindeville was well received by critics. Reviewing for AllMusic, Stephen Thomas Erlewine called it a "delight ... filled with deftly rendered vignettes and sly jokes, all delivered with heart by McBryde and frequent foil Raitiere, whose colorful drawl ensures the punch lines slide by easily". Veteran critic Robert Christgau ranked it as the sixth best album of 2022, having hailed it as a "concept album with its pants down ... simultaneously hilarious and sad as shit". He would later say that, as a concept album, he prefers it to the Who's 1969 album Tommy.

== Track listing ==
All tracks are written by Ashley McBryde, Brandy Clark, Benjy Davis, Connie Harrington, Nicolette Hayford and Aaron Raitiere except where noted.

Lindeville track listing
| No. | Title | Writer(s) | Length |
|---|---|---|---|
| 1. | "Brenda Put Your Bra On" (featuring Caylee Hammack and Pillbox Patti) | | 2:39 |
| 2. | "Jesus Jenny" (featuring Aaron Raitiere) | Jon Decious, Aaron Raitiere | 2:32 |
| 3. | "Dandelion Diner" | | 0:27 |
| 4. | "The Girl in the Picture" (featuring Pillbox Patti) | | 3:20 |
| 5. | "If These Dogs Could Talk" (featuring Brandy Clark) | | 4:11 |
| 6. | "Play Ball" (featuring Brothers Osborne) | | 3:27 |
| 7. | "Ronnie's Pawn Shop" | | 0:31 |
| 8. | "The Missed Connection Section of the Lindeville Gazette" (featuring Brandy Clark and Aaron Raitiere) | | 4:05 |
| 9. | "Gospel Night at the Strip Club" (featuring Benjy Davis) | | 2:56 |
| 10. | "Forkem Family Funeral Home" | | 0:31 |
| 11. | "When Will I Be Loved" (featuring Brandy Clark, Caylee Hammack, and Pillbox Patti) | Phil Everly | 2:06 |
| 12. | "Bonfire at Tina's" (featuring Brandy Clark, Caylee Hammack, and Pillbox Patti) | | 3:40 |
| 13. | "Lindeville" | | 3:17 |
| Total length: | | | 33:42 |

== Charts ==
Chart performance for Lindeville
| Chart (2022) | Peak position |
|---|---|
| Scottish Albums (OCC) | 20 |
| UK Country Albums (OCC) | 2 |
| UK Album Downloads (OCC) | 28 |
| US Top Album Sales (Billboard) | 45 |
