= One Night Standards =

2019 single by Ashley McBryde

Single by Ashley McBryde

from the album Never Will
- Released: September 23, 2019
- Genre: Country
- Length: 3:10
- Label: Warner Bros. Nashville
- Songwriter(s): Ashley McBryde; Nicolette Hayford; Shane McAnally
- Producer(s): Jay Joyce

Ashley McBryde singles chronology
| "Girl Goin' Nowhere" (2019) | "One Night Standards" (2019) | "Martha Divine" (2020) |

"One Night Standards" is a song co-written and recorded by American country music artist Ashley McBryde. The song was released on September 23, 2019, and served as the lead-off single to her second studio album, Never Will, released via Warner Bros. Nashville on April 3, 2020. The song was nominated at the 55th CMA Awards for Single of the Year and Song of the Year.

== Content ==
McBryde co-wrote "One Night Standards" with Nicolette Hayford and Shane McAnally, and details a woman setting the ground rules for a one-night stand in a hotel room.

== Music video ==
The music video for "One Night Standards" premiered on December 20, 2019, and is the first in a three-part video series directed by Reid Long. Filmed at the Drake Motel in Nashville, Tennessee, it depicts McBryde working as a receptionist checking in a couple, when she recognizes the man waiting outside as a friend's father. She alerts her friend, which leads to her coming down to the hotel and confronting him and the mistress with a shovel, and ends with McBryde and her friend stuffing the woman into the trunk of a car before driving away. The storyline is continued with the videos for "Martha Divine" and "Hang in There Girl," both of which were issued as promotional singles ahead of the album.

== Chart performance ==
"One Night Standards" debuted on the Billboard Country Airplay chart at number 60 on the chart dated November 18, 2019. It also became McBryde's first chart entry on the Billboard Hot 100 when it debuted at number 93 on the chart dated June 20, 2020. "One Night Standards" became McBryde's first Number One hit on the Canada Country chart dated August 29, 2020.

It has sold 23,000 copies as of January 2020, and has been certified Gold by the RIAA.

=== Weekly charts ===
| Chart (2019–2020) | Peak position |
|---|---|
| Canada (Canadian Hot 100) | 72 |
| Canada Country (Billboard) | 1 |
| US Billboard Hot 100 | 76 |
| US Country Airplay (Billboard) | 11 |
| US Hot Country Songs (Billboard) | 17 |

=== Year-end charts ===
| Chart (2020) | Position |
|---|---|
| US Country Airplay (Billboard) | 47 |
| US Hot Country Songs (Billboard) | 35 |

=== Certifications and sales ===
| Region | Certification | Certified units/sales |
|---|---|---|
| Canada (Music Canada) | Gold | 40,000^{‡} |
| United States (RIAA) | Platinum | 1,000,000 / 23,000 |
^{‡} Sales+streaming figures based on certification alone.
