= Girl Going Nowhere =

Studio album by Ashley McBryde
- Released: March 30, 2018
- Genre: Country
- Length: 40:28
- Label: Warner Bros. Nashville
- Producer: Jay Joyce

Ashley McBryde chronology
Jalopies & Expensive Guitars (2016)	Girl Going Nowhere (2018)	Never Will (2020)

Singles from Girl Going Nowhere
- 1. "A Little Dive Bar in Dahlonega" Released: October 16, 2017; 2. "Radioland" Released: July 16, 2018; 3. "Girl Goin' Nowhere" Released: January 14, 2019

Girl Going Nowhere is the third studio album and major label debut by American country music artist Ashley McBryde. It was released on March 30, 2018, through Warner Bros. Nashville.

== Content ==
The album's lead single, "A Little Dive Bar in Dahlonega," was released on October 16, 2017. It was a top 30 hit on both the Billboard Hot Country Songs and Country Airplay charts. "Radioland" was released as the second single from the album on July 16, 2018, though it failed to chart. The album's title track was released as its third single on January 14, 2019, and it debuted at number 60 on the Billboard Country Airplay chart for the week dated December 22, 2018, and eventually reached a peak of number 40 on the chart in 2019.

Jay Joyce is the album's producer. Rolling Stone described the content as "heavy on hooks and set to a radio-friendly blend of heartland riffs and pop-country. But it's also a gently left-field statement for Nashville".

Garth Brooks covered the album's title track under a revised title of "Guy Goin' Nowhere" for his Triple Live album.

== Critical reception ==
Professional ratings
Aggregate scores
Source	Rating
Metacritic	85/100
Review scores
Source	Rating
AllMusic	4/5 stars
Exclaim!	8/10 stars
Paste	8.3/10
Rolling Stone	4/5 stars
Variety	Positive

Girl Going Nowhere received acclaim from music critics. At Metacritic, which assigns a normalized rating out of 100 to reviews from mainstream critics, the album has an average score of 85, based on five reviews. Annie Reuter of Sounds Like Nashville reviewed the album positively, stating that "Embodying unique storylines and heartfelt lyrics alongside superb musicianship, Girl Going Nowhere is just a taste of what's to come from McBryde". Robert Ham of Paste called the disc "a no bullshit record free of frills and fat; 11 songs that make their points powerfully and memorably", praising McBryde's lyrics and the album's classic rock influences.

In December 2018, it received a nomination for Best Country Album at the 61st Annual Grammy Awards.

=== Accolades ===
Awards
Association	Year	Category	Result
Grammy Awards	2019	Best Country Album	Nominated

== Commercial performance ==
The album debuted at No. 7 on the Top Country Albums chart and No. 49 on the Billboard 200, selling 9,000 copies (11,000 equivalent album units) in its debut week. It has sold 44,700 copies in the United States as of July 2019.

== Track listing ==
No.	Title	Writer(s)	Length
1.	"Girl Goin' Nowhere"	Ashley McBryde; Jeremy Bussey	3:27
2.	"Radioland"	McBryde; Autumn McEntire; Chris Roberts	3:05
3.	"American Scandal"	McBryde; Randall Clay; Terri Jo Box	4:02
4.	"Southern Babylon"	McBryde; Tommy Collier	4:05
5.	"The Jacket"	McBryde; Olivia Rudeen; Neal Coty	2:40
6.	"Livin' Next to Leroy"	McBryde; Nicolette Hayford	4:30
7.	"A Little Dive Bar in Dahlonega"	McBryde; Hayford; Jesse Rice	3:29
8.	"Andy (I Can't Live Without You)"	McBryde	3:52
9.	"El Dorado"	McBryde; Clay; Patrick Savage	3:58
10.	"Tired of Being Happy"	McBryde; Clay; Blue Foley	3:50
11.	"Home Sweet Highway"	McBryde; Foley; CJ Field	3:30

== Personnel ==
- Ashley McBryde - acoustic guitar, electric guitar, lead vocals
- Chris Harris - acoustic guitar, background vocals
- Quinn Hill - drums
- Jasen Martin - bass guitar
- Caleb Mundy - bass guitar
- Andrew Sovine - acoustic guitar, electric guitar

== Charts ==
Chart (2018–19)	Peak position
Scottish Albums (Official Charts)	57
US Billboard 200	49
US Top Album Sales (Billboard)	7
US Top Country Albums (Billboard)	7
