= Ashley McBryde =

American singer-songwriter (born 1983)

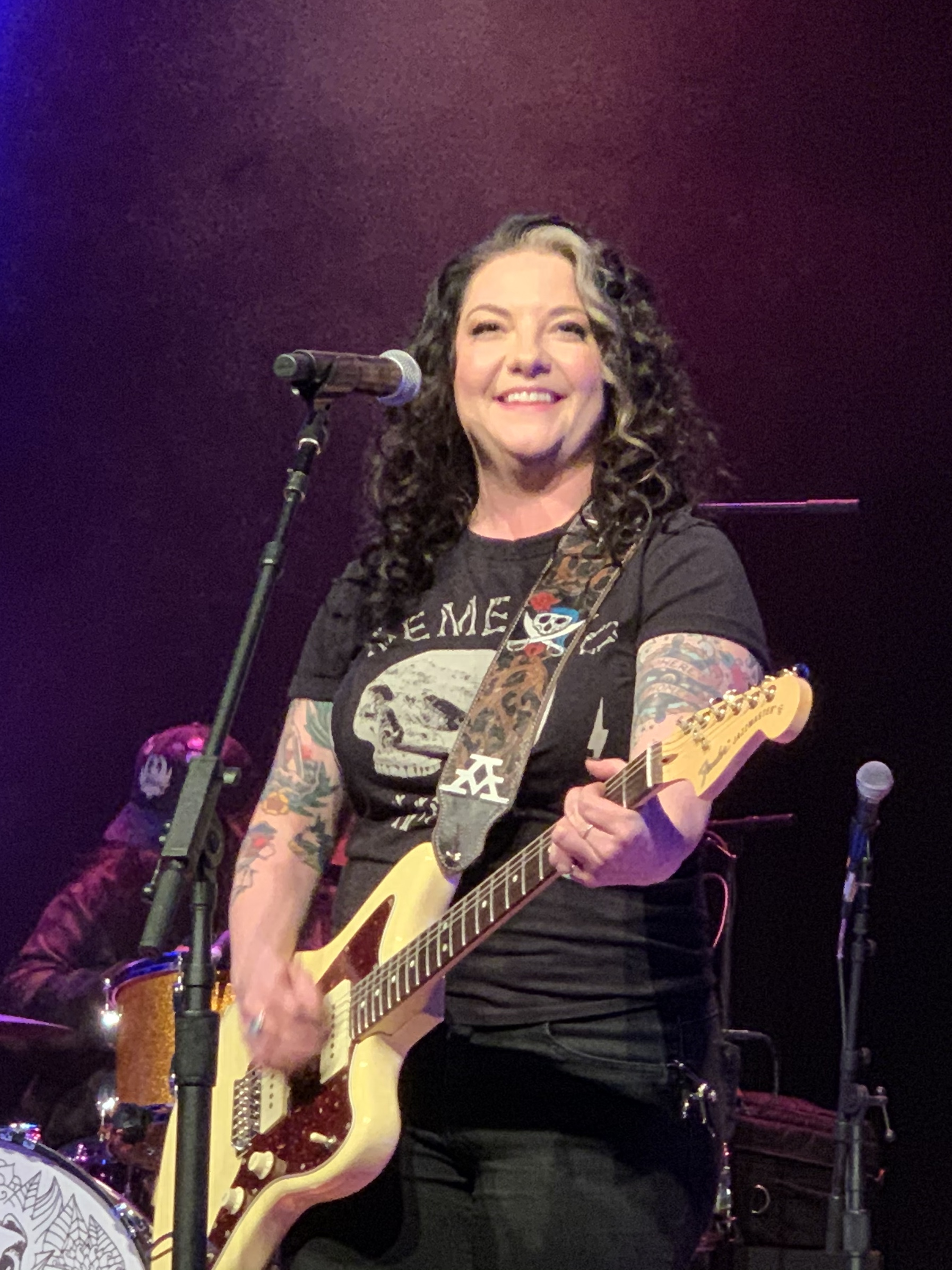
- McBryde performing in Oxford, Mississippi in 2020

Background information
- Born: Ashley Dyan McBryde; July 29, 1983 (age 43); Waldron, Arkansas, U.S.
- Genres: Country; bluegrass; country rock; country pop; rock
- Occupation: Singer–songwriter
- Instruments: Vocals; guitar
- Years active: 2006–present
- Label: Warner Music Nashville
- Website: ashleymcbryde.com

Ashley Dyan McBryde (born July 29, 1983) is an American country music singer–songwriter. She grew up in Arkansas and she was drawn to various types of music from a young age. She also developed a passion for writing songs and later moved to Nashville to pursue a music career.

Between 2006 and 2011, McBryde released a pair of self-released albums. Her 2016 extended play (EP) titled Jalopies & Expensive Guitars drew attention from country artist Eric Church. His support helped her gain a country music recording contract with Warner Music Nashville. In 2017, the label released her debut single "A Little Dive Bar in Dahlonega". The song was followed by her corresponding studio release Girl Going Nowhere (2018). Both the album and the single received critical acclaim and led to recognition from several music associations. It was followed by 2020's Never Will, which was also met with critical acclaim. Its lead single "One Night Standards" reached the top 20 of the American country songs chart and topped the Canadian country survey.

McBryde has received one Grammy Award from six nominations, one Country Music Association Award, three Academy of Country Music Awards, and was nominated for a Daytime Emmy. She earned one of country music's crowning achievements when she was invited to become a member of the Grand Ole Opry by Garth Brooks and was subsequently inducted by Terri Clark on December 10, 2022.

== Early life ==
McBryde was born in Waldron, Arkansas and raised in Saddle, Arkansas. Her father was a farmer, doctor, and preacher; she grew up in a strict household. "When I was growing up, I don’t ever remember not seeing a gun or a Bible. He raised us that way--as mean as that sounds, and as sweet as that sounds, too," she told Billboard. According to AY Magazine, "her mother read to her every night–a chapter from the Bible and a chapter from a Laura Ingalls Wilder book." As a child she was drawn to the music she heard around her house, which included songs by The Carpenters and Kris Kristofferson. She often played around on her father's guitar, which prompted her family to buy McBryde her own guitar. McBryde wrote her first song at age 12 and hoped to become a singer–songwriter. She also traveled with her mother to bluegrass festivals which further inspired her music career.

McBryde participated in the high school marching band before attending Arkansas State University where she studied French horn. At the same time she was performing regularly in clubs located in nearby Memphis, Tennessee. In one class session, a college professor noticed her disinterest and suggested she drop out to pursue music full-time. "So I did, that day," she recalled.

== Career ==
=== 2006–2016: Beginnings in Nashville ===
In 2006, McBryde self-released an eponymous demo album. In 2007, McBryde moved to Nashville to pursue a music career. She started performing with the band Deadhorse and performed at any gig she could get. This included biker bars and hangouts, and other eclectic venues in the Nashville area. She also worked a day job at Guitar Center and played open mic nights. In 2009 and 2010, she won the annual Country Showdown talent competition. McBryde's band also won Tennessee's state-wide "Battle of the Bands" contest. In 2011, she self-released her second demo album titled Elsebound. During this period, McBryde also toured frequently. She often opened concerts for country artists like Willie Nelson, Chris Stapleton, and Chris Cagle.

In 2016, McBryde released the extended play (EP) Jalopies & Expensive Guitars. The project was issued on Road Life Records. For the album cover, McBryde straightened her hair. "We were trying to play the game," she told The New York Times. She was also instructed to lose 20 pounds. The EP was discovered by Eric Church, who invited McBryde to play her song "Bible and a .44" onstage with him during one night of his "Holdin' My Own" tour. The video of her performance went viral and she was soon finding regular concert work. She also signed a management deal with Q Publishing during this same period. Also around this time, McBryde recorded what would later comprise her debut studio album. The project was heard by Cris Lacy, a senior vice president for Warner Music Nashville. Lacy was drawn to her music and signed McBryde to a recording contract with the label in September 2017.

=== 2017–2019: Breakthrough with Girl Going Nowhere ===
In 2017, Warner Music released McBryde's debut single titled "A Little Dive Bar in Dahlonega". The track became a popular download, taking higher positions on iTunes than that of more established acts like Paramore. The song climbed to number 30 on both Billboard's Country Airplay and Hot Country Songs charts. It was later named one of the 54 Best Songs of 2017 by The New York Times, and one of the Top 25 Best Country Songs of 2017 by Rolling Stone. In March 2018, the label released her debut studio album called Girl Going Nowhere. The disc reached number seven on the Billboard Top Country Albums chart and number 49 on the Billboard 200. Critics praised Girl Going Nowhere for going beyond country music's expectations for a record. Other critics like Robert Ham found that McBryde pushed for quality music versus radio-friendly hits: "The needle may keep moving for female country artists, but that’s of little concern to McBryde. She’s on a journey toward career longevity and Nowhere is her confident and solid first step." The album later spawned the title track as a single, which charted in the Country Airplay top 40.

McBryde made her first appearance at the Grand Ole Opry in 2017 and received a nomination from the Grammy Awards around the same time. Additionally, McBryde won both the Academy of Country Music's "New Female Artist of the Year" award and the Country Music Association's "New Artist of the Year" award. In fall 2018, McBryde embarked on the Girl Going Nowhere Tour, her first as a headlining act. In 2019, she joined George Strait and Little Big Town on several concert dates.

=== 2020–present: Never Will, Lindeville, The Devil I Know, and Wild ===
In September 2019, McBryde released the lead single off her next album, titled "One Night Standards". It later became her first top 20 single on both the Billboard Country Airplay and Country Songs charts. In Canada, the song reached the number one spot on their country chart. It appeared on McBryde's second studio album in April 2020, titled Never Will. The album was her second to be produced by Jay Joyce. Upon release, Never Will was McBryde's second to reach the top ten of the Country Albums chart and her second to reach a charting position on the Billboard 200. Critics drew similarities to that of her debut album. "The air of defiance in the name Never Will sets expectations for Ashley McBryde's second major-label album, echoing how the title Girl Going Nowhere framed the understanding for the 11 songs on her stellar 2018 debut," wrote AllMusic's Stephen Thomas Erlewine. The album and lead single led McBryde to receive more nominations from the Academy of Country Music and Country Music Association. Additionally, the charting single "Martha Divine" was spawned from her second album in late 2020.

With concert dates cancelled due to the COVID-19 pandemic, McBryde instead released a live EP named Never Will: Live from a Distance. In 2021, she returned to performing with her second headlining tour called This Town Talks. Later in the year, she collaborated with Carly Pearce on the duet "Never Wanted to Be That Girl", which was released as a single in September 2021 and subsequently became her first number one hit on the Country Airplay chart.

In September 2022, McBryde announced that she had completed work on two studio albums. She delayed the release of what was expected to be her third major label album in order to release the concept album Lindeville, which was produced by her longtime friend John Osborne and featured a close circle of nine key collaborators, including Brandy Clark and Caylee Hammack. The album which is named after songwriter Dennis Linde, was based on the idea of creating a fictional town for the characters in her songs to live. The album was released on September 30, 2022.

In February 2023, Warner Music released McBryde's next single titled "Light On in the Kitchen". The song will serve as the lead single for her next studio album and has since debuted on the Billboard country chart. McBryde officially announced her fourth album, The Devil I Know, on June 2. It was released on September 8, 2023.

On March 19, 2026, McBryde announced her fifth studio album, Wild, which was released on May 8.

== Musical styles and influences ==
McBryde's musical style combines country with the genres of rock, bluegrass, and pop Writer Mark Deming characterized McBryde as "a vocalist and songwriter with a touch of rock & roll swagger, a honky tonk heart, and a lyrical voice that puts a modern-day spin on classic country themes". Rolling Stone's Jonathan Bernstein called her "a whiskey-swilling high priestess of dive bars whose radically lyrics-driven, rock-leaning approach to mainstream country commands instant attention". In regards to influencing her musical style, McBryde credits Mary Chapin Carpenter, Charlie Daniels, Patty Loveless, Dolly Parton, and Hank Williams.

== Personal life ==
In 2018, McBryde's brother, Clay McBryde, died at the age of 53. Details concerning his death were not initially revealed. McBryde has publicly spoken about having a difficult relationship with her father due to her decision to pursue a music career. "My favorite song I've ever written being 'A Bible and a .44'... it's about my father, who does not approve of any of his children making a living in any kind of entertainment industry. It's unacceptable for anyone to make their living in the entertainment business," she told Taste of Country.

In September 2021, McBryde was forced to postpone a few concerts, in the midst of her headlining This Town Talks Tour, after falling off a horse and landing on her head. The accident resulted in a concussion and required stitches on her scalp.

In season 1, episode 7 of her YouTube series Made for This, McBryde details her experience and recovery from the horseback riding accident. In addition, those who were with her that day and witnessed and provided first-aid to her on the scene go into great detail of just how serious the accident was. It was later discovered that she had also fractured her pelvis in the accident. This injury took her about 12 weeks to recover.

In a February 2024 interview with CBS News Sunday Morning, McBryde revealed her past struggles with alcohol and that she had been sober for nearly two years.

== Discography ==
Studio albums

- Girl Going Nowhere (2018)
- Never Will (2020)
- Lindeville (2022)
- The Devil I Know (2023)
- Wild (2026)

== Awards and nominations ==
Year	Nominee / work	Award	Result	Ref.
2019	54th Academy of Country Music Awards	New Female Artist of the Year	Won	
2019	54th Academy of Country Music Awards	Female Artist of the Year	Nominated	
2019	61st Annual Grammy Awards	Best Country Album – Girl Going Nowhere	Nominated	
2019	18th CMT Music Awards	Breakthrough Video of the Year – "Girl Goin' Nowhere (At Marathon Music Works)"	Nominated	align="center"
2019	46th Daytime Emmy Awards	Outstanding Musical Performance in a Daytime Program – CBS This Morning Saturday	Nominated	
2019	52nd Annual Country Music Association Awards	New Artist of the Year	Won	
2020	55th Academy of Country Music Awards	Song of the Year – "Girl Goin' Nowhere"	Nominated	
2020	55th Academy of Country Music Awards	Musical Event of the Year – "Fooled Around and Fell in Love"	Won	
2020	62nd Annual Grammy Awards	Best Country Song – "Girl Goin' Nowhere"	Nominated	
2020	62nd Annual Grammy Awards	Best Country Solo Performance – "Girl Goin' Nowhere"	Nominated	
2020	19th CMT Music Awards	CMT Performance of the Year – "One Night Standards" (from 2019 CMT Artists of the Year)	Nominated	
2020	19th CMT Music Awards	Female Video of the Year - "One Night Standards"	Nominated	
2020	53rd Annual Country Music Association Awards	Album of the Year – Never Will	Nominated	
2020	53rd Annual Country Music Association Awards	Female Vocalist of the Year	Nominated	
2020	53rd Annual Country Music Association Awards	Musical Event of the Year – "Fooled Around and Fell in Love"	Nominated	
2021	56th Academy of Country Music Awards	Album of the Year – Never Will	Nominated	
2021	56th Academy of Country Music Awards	Female Artist of the Year	Nominated	
2021	56th Academy of Country Music Awards	Song of the Year – "One Night Standards"	Nominated	
2021	63rd Annual Grammy Awards	Best Country Album – Never Will	Nominated	
2021	54th Annual Country Music Association Awards	Female Artist of the Year	Nominated	
2021	54th Annual Country Music Association Awards	Single of the Year – "One Night Standards"	Nominated	
2021	54th Annual Country Music Association Awards	Song of the Year – "One Night Standards"	Nominated	
2022	57th Academy of Country Music Awards	Female Artist of the Year	Nominated	
2022	57th Academy of Country Music Awards	Video of the Year – "Never Wanted to Be That Girl" (with Carly Pearce)	Nominated	
2022	57th Academy of Country Music Awards	Music Event of the Year – "Never Wanted to Be That Girl" (with Carly Pearce)	Won	
2022	21st CMT Music Awards	Collaborative Video of the Year – "Never Wanted to Be That Girl" (with Carly Pearce)	Nominated	
2022	56th Annual Country Music Association Awards	Female Vocalist of the Year	Nominated	
2022	56th Annual Country Music Association Awards	Single of the Year -"Never Wanted to Be That Girl" (with Carly Pearce)	Nominated	
2022	56th Annual Country Music Association Awards	Song of the Year – "Never Wanted to Be That Girl" (with Shane McAnally and Carly Pearce)	Nominated	
2022	56th Annual Country Music Association Awards	Musical Event of the Year – "Never Wanted to Be That Girl" (with Carly Pearce)	Won	
2022	56th Annual Country Music Association Awards	Video of the Year – "Never Wanted to Be That Girl" (with Carly Pearce)	Nominated	
2022	56th Annual Country Music Association Awards	International Artist Achievement Award	Won	
2023	65th Annual Grammy Awards	Best Country Duo/Group Performance – "Never Wanted to Be That Girl" (with Ashley McBryde)	Won	
2023	65th Annual Grammy Awards	Best Country Album - Ashley McBryde Presents: Lindeville	Nominated	
2023	22nd CMT Music Awards	CMT Performance of the Year – "One Way Ticket" (with Carly Pearce and Leann Rimes) (from CMT Crossroads: Leann Rimes & Friends)	Nominated	align="center"
2023	58th Academy of Country Music Awards	Female Artist of the Year	Nominated	
2023	58th Academy of Country Music Awards	Album of the Year – Ashley McBryde Presents: Lindeville	Nominated	
2023	58th Academy of Country Music Awards	Single of the Year – "Never Wanted to Be That Girl" (with Carly Pearce)	Nominated	
2023	56th Annual Country Music Association Awards	Female Vocalist of the Year	Nominated	
2023	56th Annual Country Music Association Awards	Album of the Year - Ashley McBryde Presents: Lindeville	Nominated	
2023	56th Annual Country Music Association Awards	Music Video of the Year – "Light On in the Kitchen"	Nominated	
2024	23rd CMT Music Awards	Video of the Year – "Light On in the Kitchen"	Nominated	
2024	23rd CMT Music Awards	Female Video of the Year - "Light On in the Kitchen"	Nominated	
2024	59th Academy of Country Music Awards	Female Artist of the Year	Nominated	
2024	International Bluegrass Music Awards	Song of the Year - "Willow"	Nominated	
