= Never Will =

Studio album by Ashley McBryde
- Released: April 3, 2020
- Genre: Country; rock
- Length: 39:33
- Label: Warner Music Nashville
- Producer: Jay Joyce

Ashley McBryde chronology
Girl Going Nowhere (2018)	Never Will (2020)	Never Will: Live from a Distance (2021)

Singles from Never Will
- 1. "One Night Standards" Released: September 23, 2019; 2. "Martha Divine" Released: October 19, 2020

Never Will is the second studio album by American country music singer-songwriter Ashley McBryde. It was released on April 3, 2020 via Warner Music Nashville. The album is McBryde's second major label release and was preceded by the lead single "One Night Standards". McBryde launched the One Night Standards Tour in support of the album on January 30, 2020.

Never Will was nominated for the Grammy Award for Best Country Album and the Country Music Association Award for Album of the Year.

== Release and promotion ==
The album's title, track listing and release date were revealed on January 17, 2020.

=== Singles ===
The first single from the album, "One Night Standards", was released on August 30, 2019. It impacted country radio on September 23, 2019. The music video was released on December 19.

Two additional songs—"Martha Divine" and "Hang in There Girl"—were released ahead of the album as promotional singles in January 2020. Both were accompanied by music videos that made up a chronological 3-part series beginning with the video for "One Night Standards".

=== Tour ===
Beginning January 30, 2020, McBryde launched the One Night Standards Tour to support the album.

== Critical reception ==
Professional ratings
Aggregate scores
Source	Rating
Metacritic	83/100
Review scores
Source	Rating
AllMusic	4/5 stars
American Songwriter	4/5 stars
And It Don't Stop	A−
Exclaim!	8/10
Rolling Stone	4/5 stars

Never Will was met with widespread critical acclaim. At Metacritic, which assigns a weighted average rating out of 100 to reviews from professional publications, the album received an average score of 83, based on 7 reviews.

American Songwriter reviewer Hal Horowitz applauded the music, regarding it as "a rock/country hybrid that's more visceral than, well, country/rock, and hits harder too". On the other hand, Robert Christgau lamented "the production here: Nashville rock at its bigged-up schlockiest, with McBryde belting to match", but applauded the songwriting as "compact", engaging, and "so sharp it gives her the right to belt: lyrically not one of the 11 tracks is merely passable". Jonathan Bernstein from Rolling Stone similarly praised the lyrics, calling McBryde "one of country's sharpest truth-tellers".

=== Accolades ===
Accolades for Never Will
Publication	Accolade	Rank	Ref.
Billboard	Billboard's 50 Best Albums of 2020 – Mid-Year	—N/a	
Rolling Stone	Rolling Stone's 50 Best Albums of 2020 – Mid-Year	—N/a	
Spin	Spin's 30 Best Albums of 2020 – Mid-Year	—N/a	
Stereogum	Stereogum's 50 Best Albums of 2020 – Mid-Year	44	
Variety	Variety's Best Albums of 2020 – Mid-Year	—N/a	

== Track listing ==
No.	Title	Writer(s)	Length
1.	"Hang in There Girl"	Ashley McBryde; Jeremy Bussey	3:49
2.	"One Night Standards"	McBryde; Shane McAnally; Nicolette Hayford	3:10
3.	"Shut Up Sheila"	Hayford; Charles Chisholm	3:51
4.	"First Thing I Reach For"	McBryde; Randall Clay; Mick Holland	3:14
5.	"Voodoo Doll"	McBryde; Hayford; Brandy Clark; Connie Harrington; Jake Mitchell; Aaron Raitiere	3:29
6.	"Sparrow"	McBryde; Hayford; Clark; Harrington; Mitchell; Raitiere	3:50
7.	"Martha Divine"	McBryde; Jeremy Spillman	3:37
8.	"Velvet Red"	McBryde; Patrick Savage; Daniel Smalley	3:27
9.	"Stone"	McBryde; Hayford	4:15
10.	"Never Will"	McBryde; Chris Harris; Blue Foley; Matt Helmkamp; Christian Sancho; Victor Quinn Hill	3:56
11.	"Styrofoam"	Clay	2:55
Total length:			39:33

== Personnel ==
Adapted from AllMusic

- Blue Foley - background vocals
- Jason Hall- background vocals
- Chris Harris - acoustic guitar, mandolin, background vocals
- Matt Helmkamp - electric guitar, background vocals
- Quinn Hill - drums, percussion, background vocals
- Jay Joyce - Farfisa organ, acoustic guitar, electric guitar, keyboards, piano, programming, background vocals
- Jimmy Mansfield - background vocals
- Ashley McBryde - acoustic guitar, electric guitar, lead vocals, background vocals
- Chris Sancho - bass guitar, background vocals
- Trick Savage - background vocals
- Dan Smalley - background vocals

== Charts ==
Chart (2020)	Peak position
Scottish Albums (OCC)	23
UK Country Albums (OCC)	2
US Billboard 200	54
US Top Album Sales (Billboard)	6
US Top Country Albums (Billboard)	5
