= Growin' Up and Gettin' Old Tour =

2026 concert tour by Luke Combs

Growin' Up and Gettin' Older Tour
- Tour by Luke Combs
- Associated album: Growin' Up; Gettin' Old
- Start date: April 12, 2024
- End date: August 10, 2024
- Legs: 1
- No. of shows: 26 in North America; 26 Total

Luke Combs concert chronology
- Luke Combs World Tour (2023); Growin' Up and Gettin' Old Tour (2024); My Kinda Saturday Night Tour (2026)

The Growin' Up and Gettin' Old Tour was the fifth headlining concert tour by American country music artist Luke Combs and was in support of his third and fourth studio albums Growin' Up (2022) and Gettin' Old (2023). It began on April 12, 2024, in Milwaukee, Wisconsin and finished on August 10, 2024, in Houston, Texas.

== Background ==
Combs announced the tour in August 2023.

== Opening acts ==
- Colby Acuff
- The Avett Brothers
- Jordan Davis
- Charles Wesley Godwin
- Cody Jinks
- Drew Parker
- Mitchell Tenpenny
- Hailey Whitters
- The Wilder Blue

== Commercial performance ==
The tour broke attendance records at American Family Field in Milwaukee, Highmark Stadium in Buffalo, and Beaver Stadium in University Park.

=== Venue records ===
Venue records
Year	Period	Venue	Description	Ref.
April 12–13	American Family Field	United States	First act to have the highest single night and two-night attendance	
April 19–20	High Mark Stadium	United States	First act to have the highest two-night attendance	
April 27	Beaver Stadium	United States	First act to have the fastest selling and fastest grossing concert	

== Setlist ==
This set list is a representation of opening night in Milwaukee on April 12, 2024. It does not represent the set list for all the shows.

1. "Must've Never Met You"
2. "She's Got the Best of Me"
3. "Lovin' on You"
4. "My Kinda Folk"
5. "Brand New Man" (Brooks & Dunn cover)
6. "One Number Away"
7. "Houston, We Got a Problem"
8. "The Man He See in Me"
9. "This One's for You"
10. "Going, Going, Gone"
11. Fan Vote – "Beer Can"
12. "Dive" (Ed Sheeran cover)
13. "Whose Bed Have Your Boots Been Under?"/ "Drops of Jupiter"/"What Was I Thinkin'" (Shania Twain/(Train/Dierks Bentley covers)
14. "Where the Wild Things Are"
15. "Love You Anyway"
16. "Forever After All"
17. "Beautiful Crazy"
18. "Fast Car" (Tracy Chapman cover)
19. "Hurricane"
20. "Cold as You"
21. "When It Rains It Pours"
22. "1,2 Many"
23. "Beer Never Broke My Heart"

Encore

24. "Better Together"
25. "The Kind of Love We Make"

=== Fan vote ===
At each show, Combs let fans vote for one song.

- Milwaukee (April 12) – "Beer Can"

== Tour dates ==
Date	City	Country	Venue	Opening acts	Attendance	Gross
North America
April 12, 2024	Milwaukee	United States	American Family Field	Cody Jinks; Charles Wesley Godwin; The Wilder Blue	90,828	—N/a
April 13, 2024	Milwaukee	United States	American Family Field	Jordan Davis; Mitchell Tenpenny; Drew Parker; Colby Acuff	90,828	—N/a
April 19, 2024	Buffalo	United States	Highmark Stadium	The Avett Brothers; Cody Jinks; Charles Wesley Godwin; The Wilder Blue	99,671	—N/a
April 20, 2024	Buffalo	United States	Highmark Stadium	Jordan Davis; Mitchell Tenpenny; Drew Parker; Colby Acuff	99,671	—N/a
April 27, 2024	University Park	United States	Beaver Stadium	Jordan Davis; Mitchell Tenpenny; Drew Parker; Colby Acuff	73,339	—N/a
May 3, 2024	Jacksonville	United States	Everbank Stadium	Cody Jinks; Charles Wesley Godwin; The Wilder Blue; Hailey Whitters	—N/a	—N/a
May 4, 2024	Jacksonville	United States	Everbank Stadium	Jordan Davis; Drew Parker; Colby Acuff	—N/a	—N/a
May 10, 2024	San Antonio	United States	Alamodome	Cody Jinks; Charles Wesley Godwin; The Wilder Blue; Hailey Whitters	—N/a	—N/a
May 11, 2024	San Antonio	United States	Alamodome	Jordan Davis; Mitchell Tenpenny; Drew Parker; Colby Acuff	—N/a	—N/a
May 17, 2024	Santa Clara	United States	Levi's Stadium	Cody Jinks; Charles Wesley Godwin; The Wilder Blue; Hailey Whitters	—N/a	—N/a
May 18, 2024	Santa Clara	United States	Levi's Stadium	Jordan Davis; Drew Parker; Colby Acuff	—N/a	—N/a
May 31, 2024	Glendale	United States	State Farm Stadium	Cody Jinks; Charles Wesley Godwin; The Wilder Blue; Hailey Whitters	—N/a	—N/a
June 1, 2024	Glendale	United States	State Farm Stadium	Jordan Davis; Drew Parker; Colby Acuff	—N/a	—N/a
June 7, 2024	Salt Lake City	United States	Rice-Eccles Stadium	Cody Jinks; Charles Wesley Godwin; The Wilder Blue; Hailey Whitters	—N/a	—N/a
June 8, 2024	Salt Lake City	United States	Rice-Eccles Stadium	Jordan Davis; Mitchell Tenpenny; Drew Parker; Colby Acuff	—N/a	—N/a
June 14, 2024	Inglewood	United States	SoFi Stadium	The Avett Brothers; Charles Wesley Godwin; Hailey Whitters the Wilder Blue	70,000	—N/a
June 15, 2024	Inglewood	United States	SoFi Stadium	Jordan Davis; Drew Parker; Colby Acuff		—N/a
July 14, 2024	Craven	Canada	Country Thunder Saskatchewan	—N/a	—N/a	—N/a
July 19, 2024	East Rutherford	United States	MetLife Stadium	Cody Jinks; Charles Wesley Godwin; The Wilder Blue; Hailey Whitters	—N/a	—N/a
July 20, 2024	East Rutherford	United States	MetLife Stadium	Jordan Davis; Mitchel Tenpenny; Drew Parker; Colby Acuff	—N/a	—N/a
July 26, 2024	Landover	United States	FedExField	Cody Jinks; Charles Wesley Godwin; The Wilder Blue	—N/a	—N/a
July 27, 2024	Landover	United States	FedExField	Jordan Davis; Mitchell Tenpenny; Drew Parker; Colby Acuff	—N/a	—N/a
August 2, 2024	Cincinnati	United States	Paycor Stadium	Cody Jinks; Charles Wesley Godwin; The Wilder Blue; Hailey Whitters	—N/a	—N/a
August 4, 2024	Cincinnati	United States	Paycor Stadium	Jordan Davis; Mitchell Tenpenny; Drew Parker; Colby Acuff	—N/a	—N/a
August 9, 2024	Houston	United States	NRG Stadium	Cody Jinks; Charles Wesley Godwin; The Wilder Blue; Hailey Whitters	—N/a	—N/a
August 10, 2024	Houston	United States	NRG Stadium	Jordan Davis; Mitchell Tenpenny; Drew Parker; Colby Acuff	—N/a	—N/a
