= Luke Combs World Tour =

2023 concert tour by Luke Combs

Luke Combs Tour
- Tour by Luke Combs
- Associated album: Gettin' Old
- Start date: March 24, 2023
- End date: October 20, 2023
- Legs: 3
- No. of shows: 22 in North America; 8 in Oceania; 14 in Europe; 43 Total

Luke Combs concert chronology
- What You See Is What You Get Tour (2020–21); Luke Combs World Tour (2023); Growin' Up and Gettin' Old Tour (2024)

The Luke Combs World Tour was the fourth headlining concert tour by American country music artist Luke Combs and was in support of his fourth studio album Gettin' Old (2023). This was his first stadium and world tour. It began on March 25, 2023, in Arlington, Texas and finished on October 20, 2023, in London, England.

== Background ==
The tour was first announced in September 2022. Due to overwhelming ticket demand, Combs added second shows in select cities.

== Critical reception ==
Courtney Dabney of Paper City, who attend the opening night in Arlington, Texas, said the show was great but thought the concert could have been better if it took place at a venue with better acoustics.

Betsy Reed of The Guardian gave the Glasgow show two out of five stars stating, "Ironically, despite Combs' down-home appeal, his show is too slick to elevate the material beyond the middle of the road. Combs' stylized country vocals seem effortlessly strong and his band are tight and precise, but there's some crucial alchemy missing."

== Opening acts ==
- 49 Winchester
- Gary Allan
- The Avett Brothers
- Flatland Cavalry
- Brent Cobb
- Riley Green
- Cody Johnson
- Old Crow Medicine Show
- Lane Pittman
- Turnpike Troubadours
- Lainey Wilson

== Setlist ==
This set list is a representation of opening night in Arlington, Texas. It does not represent the set list for all the shows.

1. "Lovin' on You"
2. "Hannah Ford Road"
3. "Cold as You"
4. "One Number Away"
5. "Love You Anyway"
6. "Going, Going, Gone"
7. "Growin' Up and Gettin' Old"
8. "Does to Me" (performed with Riley Green)
9. "Forever After All"
10. "Dust on the Bottle" / "Meet in the Middle" / "When I Was Your Man" (David Lee Murphy, Diamond Rio, and Bruno Mars covers performed by the band during band introductions)
11. "Beautiful Crazy"
12. "Joe"
13. "Outrunnin' Your Memory" (performed with Lainey Wilson)
14. "Fast Car" (Tracy Chapman cover)
15. "5 Leaf Clover"
16. "Houston, We Got a Problem"
17. "Must've Never Met You"
18. "Hurricane"
19. "1,2 Many"
20. "When It Rains It Pours"
21. "Beer Never Broke My Heart"

Encore

22. "The Kind of Love We Make"
23. "Brand New Man" (performed with Riley Green, Lainey Wilson and Brent Cobb)

Notes

- "Don't Tell Me", "Where the Wild Things Are", and "Better Together" was performed in Charlotte.

== Tour dates ==
Date	City	Country	Venue	Opening acts
North America
March 25, 2023	Arlington	United States	AT&T Stadium	Riley Green; Lainey Wilson; Flatland Cavalry; Brent Cobb
April 1, 2023	Indianapolis	United States	Lucas Oil Stadium	Riley Green; Lainey Wilson; Flatland Cavalry; Brent Cobb
April 14, 2023	Nashville	United States	Nissan Stadium	Riley Green; Mitchell Tenpenny; Flatland Cavalry; Brent Cobb
April 15, 2023	Nashville	United States	Nissan Stadium	Riley Green; Lainey Wilson; Flatland Cavalry; Brent Cobb
April 22, 2023	Detroit	United States	Ford Field	Riley Green; Lainey Wilson; Flatland Cavalry; Brent Cobb
April 29, 2023	Pittsburgh	United States	Acrisure Stadium	Riley Green; Lainey Wilson; Flatland Cavalry; Brent Cobb
May 6, 2023	Chicago	United States	Soldier Field	Riley Green; Lainey Wilson; Flatland Cavalry; Brent Cobb
May 13, 2023	Minneapolis	United States	U.S. Bank Stadium	Riley Green; Lainey Wilson; Flatland Cavalry; Brent Cobb
May 20, 2023	Boise	United States	Albertsons Stadium	Riley Green; Lainey Wilson; Flatland Cavalry; Brent Cobb
May 27, 2023	Vancouver	Canada	BC Place	Brent Cobb
June 3, 2023	Edmonton	Canada	Commonwealth Stadium	—N/a
June 10, 2023	Kansas City	United States	Arrowhead Stadium	—N/a
June 17, 2023	St. Louis	United States	Busch Stadium	Riley Green; Lainey Wilson; Flatland Cavalry; Brent Cobb
July 7, 2023	Tampa	United States	Raymond James Stadium	Gary Allan; Lainey Wilson; Brent Cobb
July 8, 2023	Tampa	United States	Raymond James Stadium	Riley Green; Lainey Wilson; Flatland Cavalry; Brent Cobb
July 14, 2023	Charlotte	United States	Bank of America Stadium	Turnpike Troubadours; Gary Allan; Brent Cobb
July 15, 2023	Charlotte	United States	Bank of America Stadium	Riley Green; Lainey Wilson; Flatland Cavalry; Brent Cobb
July 21, 2023	Foxborough	United States	Gillette Stadium	Gary Allan; The Avett Brothers; Brent Cobb
July 22, 2023	Foxborough	United States	Gillette Stadium	Riley Green; Lainey Wilson; Flatland Cavalry; Brent Cobb
July 28, 2023	Philadelphia	United States	Lincoln Financial Field	Old Crow Medicine Show; Brent Cobb; Turnpike Troubadours
July 29, 2023	Philadelphia	United States	Lincoln Financial Field	Riley Green; Lainey Wilson; Flatland Cavalry; Brent Cobb
Oceania
August 9, 2023	Auckland	New Zealand	Spark Arena	Cody Johnson; Lane Pittman
August 11, 2023	Brisbane	Australia	Brisbane Entertainment Centre	Cody Johnson; Lane Pittman
August 16, 2023	Sydney	Australia	Qudos Bank Arena	Cody Johnson; Lane Pittman
August 17, 2023	Sydney	Australia	Qudos Bank Arena	Cody Johnson; Lane Pittman
August 19, 2023	Melbourne	Australia	Rod Laver Arena	Cody Johnson; Lane Pittman
August 20, 2023	Melbourne	Australia	Rod Laver Arena	Cody Johnson; Lane Pittman
August 23, 2023	Adelaide	Australia	Adelaide Entertainment Centre	Cody Johnson; Lane Pittman
August 26, 2023	Perth	Australia	RAC Arena	Cody Johnson; Lane Pittman
Europe
September 30, 2023	Oslo	Norway	Oslo Spektrum	—N/a
October 1, 2023	Stockholm	Sweden	Avicii Arena	49 Winchester
October 4, 2023	Copenhagen	Denmark	Royal Arena	49 Winchester
October 6, 2023	Hamburg	Germany	Barclays Arena	49 Winchester
October 7, 2023	Amsterdam	Netherlands	AFAS Live	49 Winchester
October 8, 2023	Paris	France	La Cigale	49 Winchester
October 10, 2023	Zürich	Switzerland	The Hall	49 Winchester
October 11, 2023	Brussels	Belgium	Ancienne Belgique	49 Winchester
October 13, 2023	Dublin	Ireland	3Arena	49 Winchester
October 14, 2023	Belfast	Northern Ireland	SSE Arena	49 Winchester
October 16, 2023	Glasgow	Scotland	OVO Hydro	49 Winchester
October 17, 2023	Manchester	England	AO Arena	49 Winchester
October 19, 2023	London	England	The O_{2} Arena	49 Winchester
October 20, 2023	London	England	The O_{2} Arena	49 Winchester
