= List of UK Country Albums Chart number ones of 2023 =

These are the Official Charts Company's UK Country Albums Chart number ones of 2023. The chart week runs from Friday to Thursday with the chart-date given as the following Thursday. Chart positions are based the multi-metric consumption of country music in the United Kingdom, blending traditional album sales, track equivalent albums, and streaming equivalent albums. The chart contains 20 positions.

In the iteration of the chart dated 6 January, Nathan Carter's The Morning After spent its second week at number one after reaching the top spot in the final week of 2022. He returned to the chart peak in December with his follow-up album Music Man. Taylor Swift's re-recording of her 2008 album Fearless hit number one for the 28th non-consecutive week, and would spend a total of ten weeks atop the chart throughout 2023. Luke Combs spent the most weeks at number one during the year, with his album Growin' Up and its successor Gettin' Old spanning a cumulative thirteen weeks at the chart peak. Welsh/American group Far from Saints spent a total of six weeks at number one with their self-titled debut album, while Margo Price and Chris Stapleton's albums Strays and Higher each held the top spot for three consecutive weeks in January/February and November/December respectively. Notably, Shania Twain's seminal Come On Over album re-entered the chart as she began the UK leg of her Queen of Me Tour, and reached number one for the 117th week on the chart dated 1 September, and remaining there for a record-extending 118th week before being displaced by Ashley McBryde's fourth album The Devil I Know, which spent two weeks at the top. Other artists to spend multiple weeks at number one include Brothers Osborne, Cowboy Junkies, Robert Forster, and Ward Thomas. The final number one of the year was Fearless (Taylor's Version) by Swift.

== Chart history ==
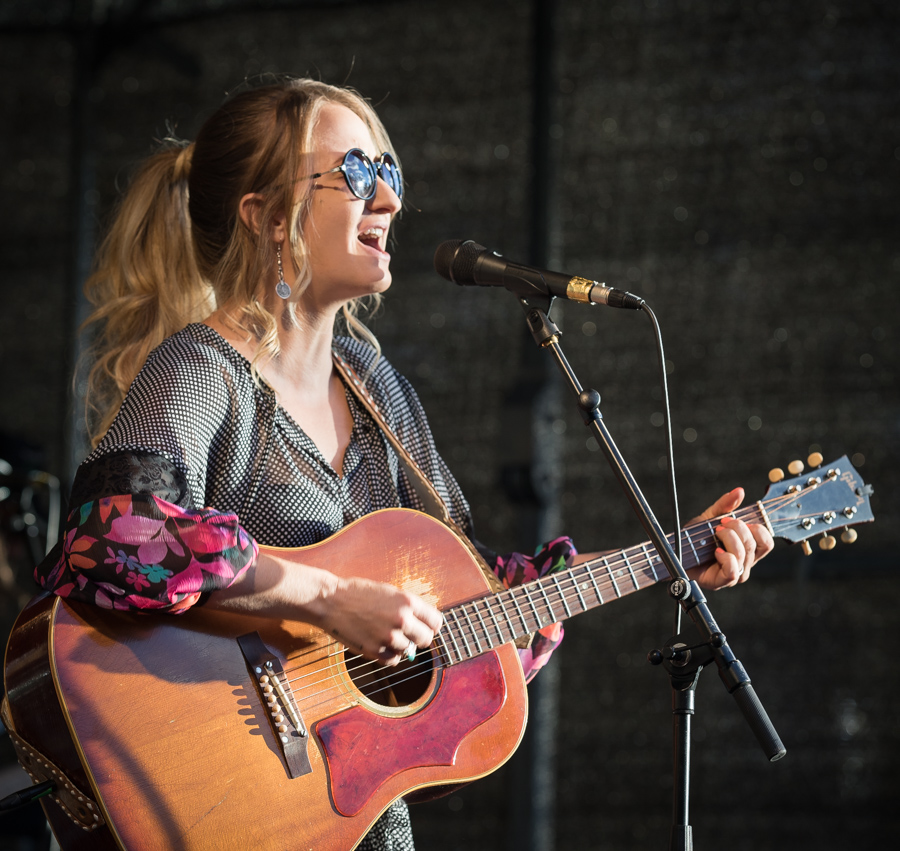
Margo Price's fourth studio album Strays spent three consecutive weeks at number one.

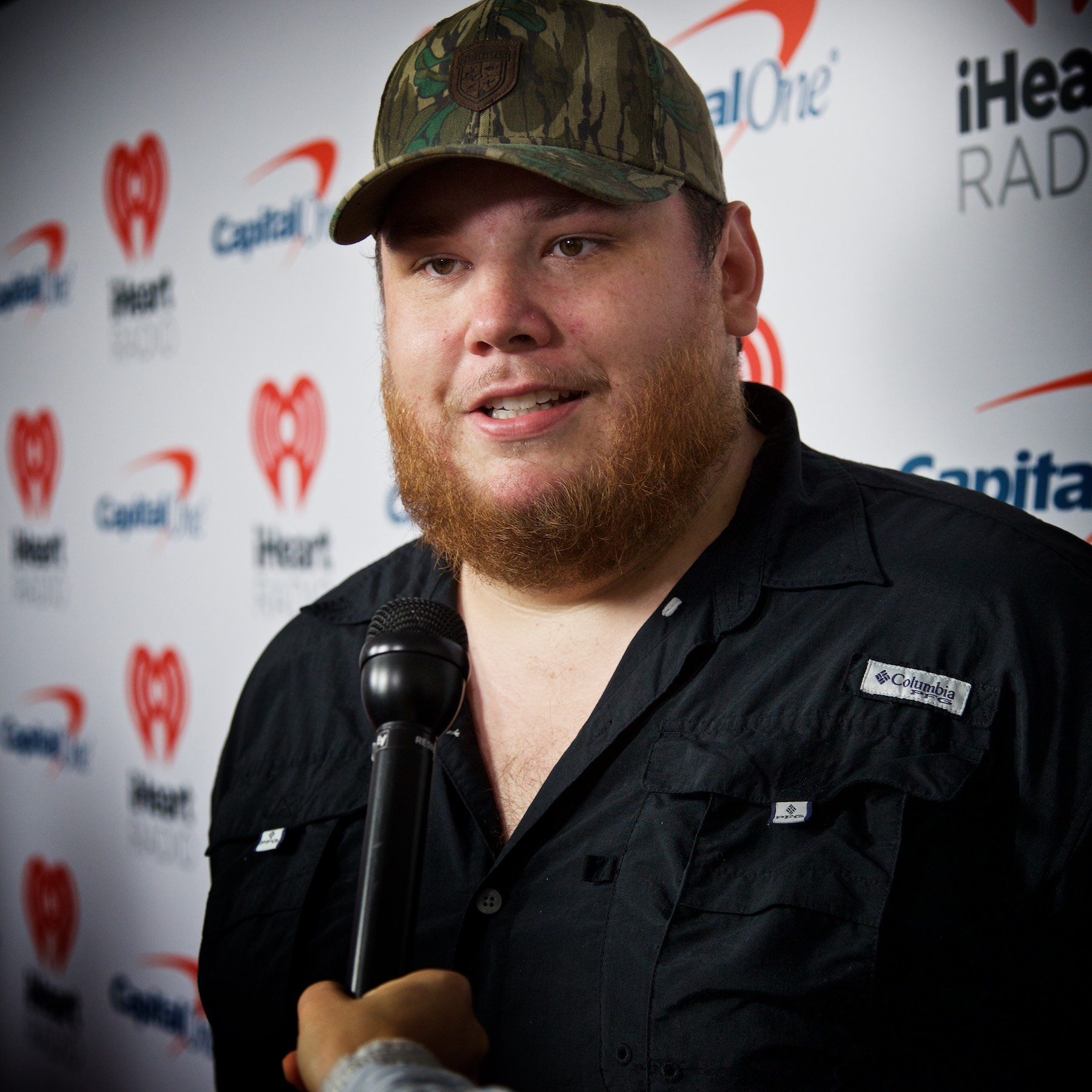
Luke Combs spent a collective thirteen weeks at the top of the chart with his albums Growin' Up and Gettin' Old.

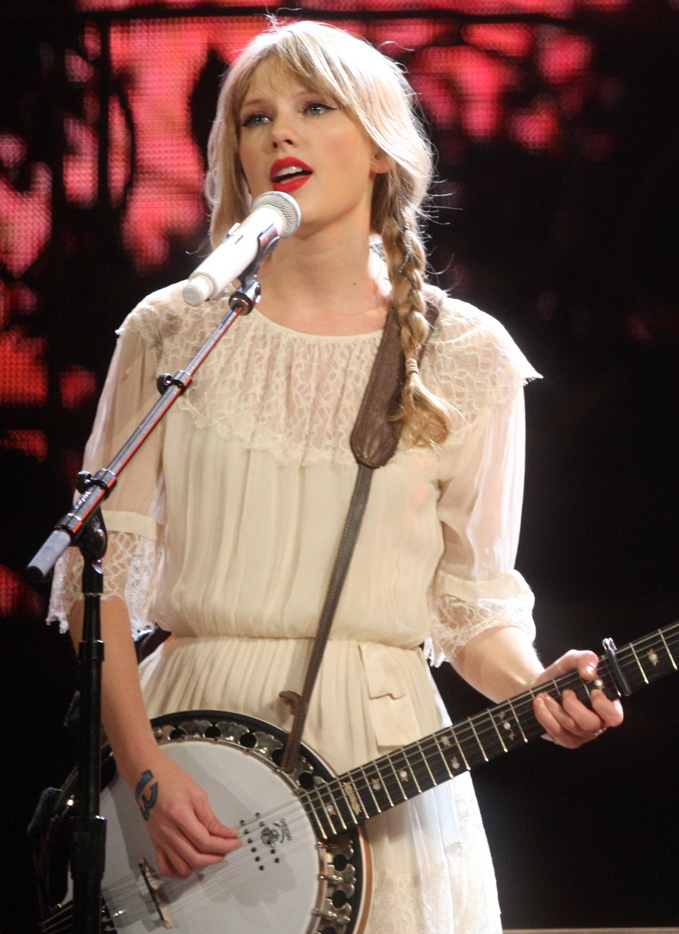
Fearless by Taylor Swift spent ten non-consecutive weeks at number one.

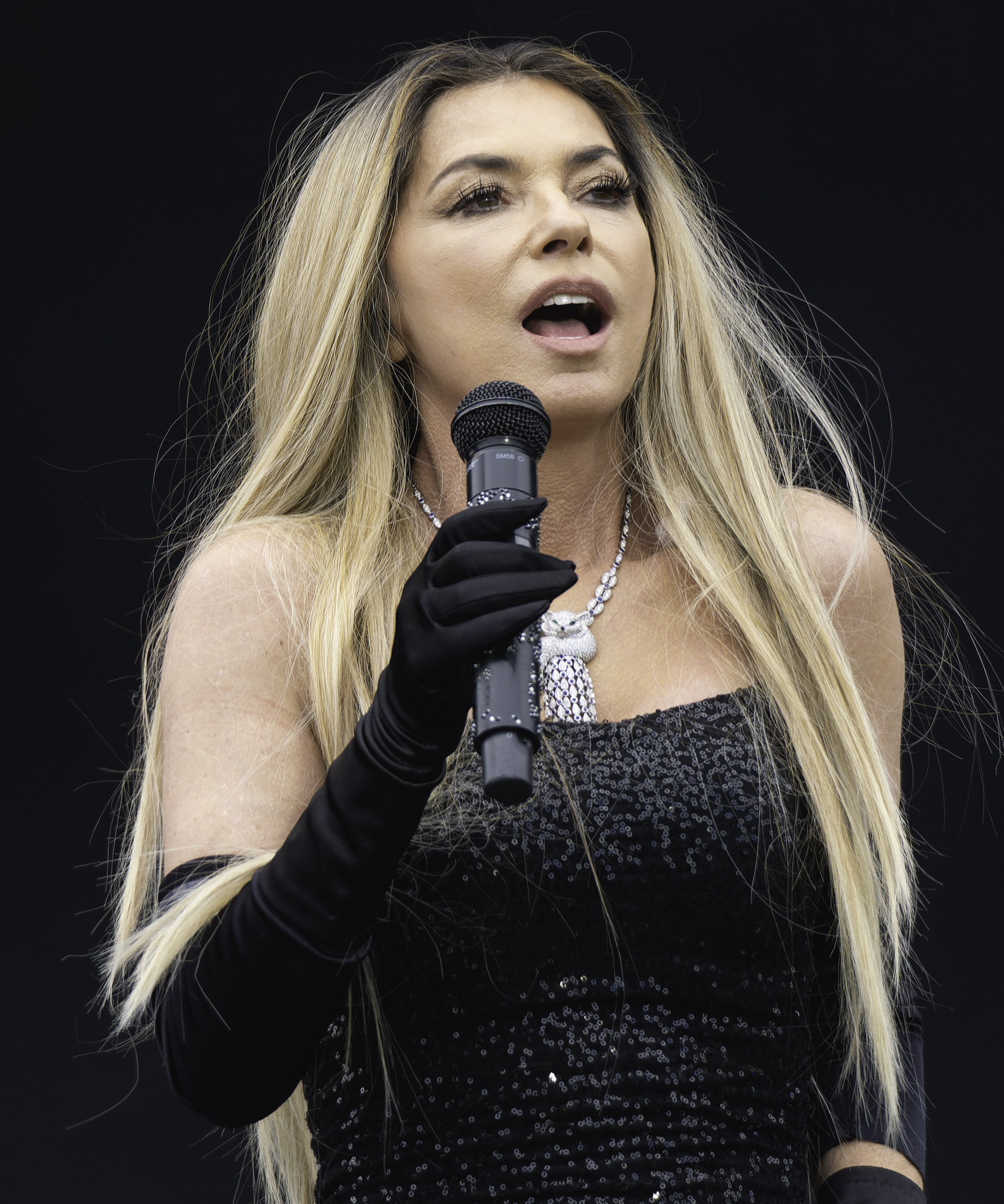
In September, Shania Twain's classic 1997 album Come On Over returned to number one for two weeks in conjunction with the UK leg of her Queen of Me Tour.

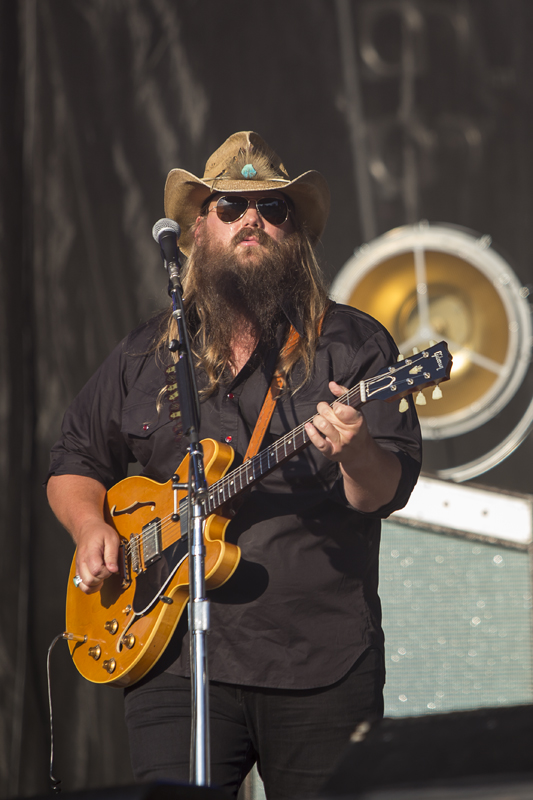
Chris Stapleton's Higher spent three weeks at number one.

Issue date	Album	Artist(s)	Record label	Ref.
6 January	The Morning After	Nathan Carter	Sharpe Music	
13 January	Fearless (Taylor's Version)	Taylor Swift	EMI	
20 January	Strays	Margo Price	Loma Vista	
27 January	Strays	Margo Price	Loma Vista	
3 February	Strays	Margo Price	Loma Vista	
10 February	The Candle and the Flame	Robert Forster	Tapete	
17 February	The Candle and the Flame	Robert Forster	Tapete	
24 February	Growin' Up	Luke Combs	Sony	
3 March	Growin' Up	Luke Combs	Sony	
10 March	One Thing at a Time	Morgan Wallen	EMI	
17 March	Music in the Madness	Ward Thomas	WTW	
24 March	Music in the Madness	Ward Thomas	WTW	
31 March	Gettin' Old	Luke Combs	Sony	
7 April	Gettin' Old	Luke Combs	Sony	
14 April	Gettin' Old	Luke Combs	Sony	
21 April	Gettin' Old	Luke Combs	Sony	
28 April	Gettin' Old	Luke Combs	Sony	
5 May	Gettin' Old	Luke Combs	Sony	
12 May	Damn Love	Kip Moore	Spinefarm	
19 May	Gettin' Old	Luke Combs	Sony	
26 May	Gettin' Old	Luke Combs	Sony	
2 June	Gettin' Old	Luke Combs	Sony	
9 June	Such Ferocious Beauty	Cowboy Junkies	Ignition	
16 June	Such Ferocious Beauty	Cowboy Junkies	Ignition	
23 June	Far from Saints	Far from Saints	Ignition	
30 June	Far from Saints	Far from Saints	Ignition	
7 July	Far from Saints	Far from Saints	Ignition	
14 July	Fearless (Taylor's Version)	Taylor Swift	EMI	
21 July	Fearless (Taylor's Version)	Taylor Swift	EMI	
28 July	Far from Saints	Far from Saints	Ignition	
4 August	Far from Saints	Far from Saints	Ignition	
11 August	Far from Saints	Far from Saints	Ignition	
18 August	Fearless (Taylor's Version)	Taylor Swift	EMI	
25 August	Fearless (Taylor's Version)	Taylor Swift	EMI	
1 September	Come On Over	Shania Twain	Universal	
8 September	Come On Over	Shania Twain	Universal	
15 September	The Devil I Know	Ashley McBryde	Rhino	
22 September	The Devil I Know	Ashley McBryde	Rhino	
29 September	Brothers Osborne	Brothers Osborne	Spinefarm	
6 October	Brothers Osborne	Brothers Osborne	Spinefarm	
13 October	Fearless (Taylor's Version)	Taylor Swift	EMI	
20 October	Gettin' Old	Luke Combs	Sony	
27 October	Gettin' Old	Luke Combs	Sony	
3 November	The Years Go Fast	The Cadillac Three	Big Machine	
10 November	Fearless (Taylor's Version)	Taylor Swift	EMI	
17 November	Higher	Chris Stapleton	EMI	
24 November	Higher	Chris Stapleton	EMI	
1 December	Higher	Chris Stapleton	EMI	
8 December	Fearless (Taylor's Version)	Taylor Swift	EMI	
15 December	Fearless (Taylor's Version)	Taylor Swift	EMI	
22 December	Music Man	Nathan Carter	Sharpe Music	
29 December	Fearless (Taylor's Version)	Taylor Swift	EMI	

== Most weeks at number one ==
Weeks at number one	Artist
13	Luke Combs
10	Taylor Swift
6	Far from Saints
3	Chris Stapleton
3	Margo Price
2	Ashley McBryde
2	Brothers Osborne
2	Cowboy Junkies
2	Nathan Carter
2	Robert Forster
2	Shania Twain
2	Ward Thomas

== See also ==
- List of UK Albums Chart number ones of 2023
- List of UK Dance Singles Chart number ones of 2023
- List of UK Album Downloads Chart number ones of 2023
- List of UK Independent Albums Chart number ones of 2023
- List of UK R&B Albums Chart number ones of 2023
- List of UK Rock & Metal Albums Chart number ones of 2023
- List of UK Compilation Chart number ones of the 2020s
