= 49th People's Choice Awards =

Pop culture award show held in 2024

- Date: February 18, 2024
- Location: Barker Hangar; Santa Monica, California
- Country: United States
- Hosted by: Simu Liu

Highlights
- Most wins: Film; Barbie (5); Television; The Kardashians, The Last of Us and Only Murders in the Building (2); Music; Taylor Swift (4)
- Most nominations: Film; Barbie (8); Television; Only Murders in the Building (7); Music; Luke Combs, Nicki Minaj, Taylor Swift, and Morgan Wallen (5)
- Website: www.votepca.com

Television/radio coverage
- Network: NBC; E! Peacock (streaming)
- Viewership: 407,000 (E!); 3.5 million (NBC)
- Produced by: Barb Bialkowski; Jesse Ignjatovic; Evan Prager

The 49th ceremony of the People's Choice Awards was held on February 18, 2024, at the Barker Hangar in Santa Monica, California. Hosted by Simu Liu, the show was broadcast live simultaneously on NBC and E! and streamed live on Peacock. Nominees spanning 45 categories for film, television, music, and popular culture were announced on January 11, 2024.

Barbie led the Film categories with eight nominations and was the most-awarded nominee with five awards, including Movie of the Year. Only Murders in the Building led the Television categories with seven nominations and was the most-awarded nominee alongside The Kardashians and The Last of Us receiving two awards each. Luke Combs, Nicki Minaj, Taylor Swift and Morgan Wallen led the Music categories with five nominations each, with Swift emerging as the most-awarded nominee with four awards. Grey's Anatomy won the Show of the Year. Adam Sandler and Lenny Kravitz were honored with the People's Icon Award and Music Icon Award, respectively.

== Background ==
Since E! network announced that they had acquired the People's Choice Awards in 2017, the awards ceremony was shifted from its previous January scheduling to November, to reduce its proximity to the busier months of awards season. In June 2023, E! announced that the show moved to February 2024, while the eligibility window for nominees was from January 1 through December 31, 2023. The network also announced a partnership with Peacock to stream the ceremony, along with NBC.

== Performers ==
Artist(s)	Song(s)
Kylie Minogue	"Padam Padam"
Lainey Wilson	Medley: "Country’s Cool Again" "Things a Man Oughta Know" "Heart Like a Truck" "Watermelon Moonshine"

== Nominees and winners ==
Nominees were revealed online on January 11, 2024.

Winners are listed first and highlighted in bold.

=== Film ===
The Movie of the Year	The Action Movie of the Year
**Barbie**; Fast X; Guardians of the Galaxy Vol. 3; The Little Mermaid; Oppenheimer; Spider-Man: Across the Spider-Verse; The Super Mario Bros. Movie; Taylor Swift: The Eras Tour	**The Hunger Games: The Ballad of Songbirds & Snakes**; Ant-Man and the Wasp: Quantumania; Fast X; Guardians of the Galaxy Vol. 3; John Wick: Chapter 4; The Marvels; Mission: Impossible – Dead Reckoning Part One; Transformers: Rise of the Beasts
The Comedy Movie of the Year	The Drama Movie of the Year
**Barbie**; 80 for Brady; Anyone but You; Are You There God? It's Me, Margaret.; Asteroid City; Cocaine Bear; No Hard Feelings; Wonka	**Oppenheimer**; The Color Purple; Creed III; Five Nights at Freddy's; Killers of the Flower Moon; Leave the World Behind; M3GAN; Scream VI
The Male Movie Star of the Year	The Female Movie Star of the Year
**Ryan Gosling – Barbie**; Timothée Chalamet – Wonka; Tom Cruise – Mission: Impossible – Dead Reckoning Part One; Leonardo DiCaprio – Killers of the Flower Moon; Michael B. Jordan – Creed III; Cillian Murphy – Oppenheimer; Chris Pratt – Guardians of the Galaxy Vol. 3; Keanu Reeves – John Wick: Chapter 4	**Margot Robbie – Barbie**; Halle Bailey – The Little Mermaid; Viola Davis – The Hunger Games: The Ballad of Songbirds & Snakes; Jennifer Lawrence – No Hard Feelings; Jenna Ortega – Scream VI; Florence Pugh – Oppenheimer; Julia Roberts – Leave the World Behind; Rachel Zegler – The Hunger Games: The Ballad of Songbirds & Snakes
The Action Movie Star of the Year	The Comedy Movie Star of the Year
**Rachel Zegler – The Hunger Games: The Ballad of Songbirds & Snakes**; Tom Cruise – Mission: Impossible – Dead Reckoning Part One; Viola Davis – The Hunger Games: The Ballad of Songbirds & Snakes; Gal Gadot – Heart of Stone; Brie Larson – The Marvels; Jason Momoa – Aquaman and the Lost Kingdom; Chris Pratt – Guardians of the Galaxy Vol. 3; Keanu Reeves – John Wick: Chapter 4	**Jennifer Lawrence – No Hard Feelings**; Timothée Chalamet – Wonka; Ryan Gosling – Barbie; Scarlett Johansson – Asteroid City; Glen Powell – Anyone but You; Margot Robbie – Barbie; Adam Sandler – You Are So Not Invited to My Bat Mitzvah; Sydney Sweeney – Anyone but You
The Drama Movie Star of the Year	The Movie Performance of the Year
**Jenna Ortega – Scream VI**; Fantasia Barrino – The Color Purple; Leonardo DiCaprio – Killers of the Flower Moon; Jacob Elordi – Priscilla; Michael B. Jordan – Creed III; Cillian Murphy – Oppenheimer; Florence Pugh – Oppenheimer; Julia Roberts – Leave the World Behind	**America Ferrera – Barbie**; Danielle Brooks – The Color Purple; Viola Davis – Air; Jacob Elordi – Saltburn; Simu Liu – Barbie; Melissa McCarthy – The Little Mermaid; Charles Melton – May December; Natalie Portman – May December

=== TV ===
The Show of the Year	The Comedy Show of the Year
**Grey's Anatomy**; The Bear; The Last of Us; Law & Order: Special Victims Unit; Only Murders in the Building; Saturday Night Live; Ted Lasso; Vanderpump Rules	**Only Murders in the Building**; Abbott Elementary; And Just Like That...; The Bear; Never Have I Ever; Saturday Night Live; Ted Lasso; Young Sheldon
The Drama Show of the Year	The Sci-Fi/Fantasy Show of the Year
**The Last of Us**; Chicago Fire; Ginny & Georgia; Grey's Anatomy; Law & Order: Special Victims Unit; The Morning Show; Outer Banks; Succession	**Loki**; Ahsoka; American Horror Story: Delicate; Black Mirror; Ghosts; The Mandalorian; Secret Invasion; The Witcher
The Reality Show of the Year	The Competition Show of the Year
**The Kardashians**; 90 Day Fiancé: Happily Ever After?; Below Deck; Jersey Shore: Family Vacation; The Real Housewives of Beverly Hills; The Real Housewives of New Jersey; Selling Sunset; Vanderpump Rules	**The Voice**; America's Got Talent; American Idol; Big Brother; Dancing with the Stars; RuPaul's Drag Race; Squid Game: The Challenge; Survivor
The Bingeworthy Show of the Year	The Male TV Star of the Year
**The Summer I Turned Pretty**; Beef; Citadel; The Crown; Jury Duty; Love Is Blind; The Night Agent; Queen Charlotte: A Bridgerton Story	**Pedro Pascal – The Last of Us**; Kieran Culkin – Succession; Tom Hiddleston – Loki; Samuel L. Jackson – Secret Invasion; Steve Martin – Only Murders in the Building; Chase Stokes – Outer Banks; Jason Sudeikis – Ted Lasso; Jeremy Allen White – The Bear
The Female TV Star of the Year	The Comedy TV Star of the Year
**Selena Gomez – Only Murders in the Building**; Jennifer Aniston – The Morning Show; Quinta Brunson – Abbott Elementary; Rosario Dawson – Ahsoka; Mariska Hargitay – Law & Order: Special Victims Unit; Hannah Waddingham – Ted Lasso; Reese Witherspoon – The Morning Show; Ali Wong – Beef	**Jeremy Allen White – The Bear**; Quinta Brunson – Abbott Elementary; Selena Gomez – Only Murders in the Building; Steve Martin – Only Murders in the Building; Jason Sudeikis – Ted Lasso; Hannah Waddingham – Ted Lasso; Ali Wong – Beef; Bowen Yang – Saturday Night Live
The Drama TV Star of the Year	The TV Performance of the Year
**Jennifer Aniston – The Morning Show**; Kieran Culkin – Succession; Mariska Hargitay – Law & Order: Special Victims Unit; Ice-T – Law & Order: Special Victims Unit; Pedro Pascal – The Last of Us; Bella Ramsey – The Last of Us; Chase Stokes – Outer Banks; Reese Witherspoon – The Morning Show	**Billie Eilish – Swarm**; Adjoa Andoh – Queen Charlotte: A Bridgerton Story; Matt Bomer – Fellow Travelers; Ayo Edebiri – The Bear; Jon Hamm – The Morning Show; Storm Reid – The Last of Us; Meryl Streep – Only Murders in the Building; Steven Yeun – Beef
The Reality TV Star of the Year	The Competition Contestant of the Year
**Khloé Kardashian – The Kardashians**; Garcelle Beauvais – The Real Housewives of Beverly Hills; Kandi Burruss – The Real Housewives of Atlanta; Kim Kardashian – The Kardashians; Ariana Madix – Vanderpump Rules; Kyle Richards – The Real Housewives of Beverly Hills; Mike "The Situation" Sorrentino – Jersey Shore: Family Vacation; Chrishell Stause – Selling Sunset	**Ariana Madix – Dancing with the Stars**; Anetra – RuPaul's Drag Race; Sasha Colby – RuPaul's Drag Race; Xochitl Gomez – Dancing with the Stars; Charity Lawson – The Bachelorette; Theresa Nist – The Golden Bachelor; Keke Palmer – That's My Jam; Iam Tongi – American Idol
The Daytime Talk Show of the Year	The Nighttime Talk Show of the Year
**The Kelly Clarkson Show**; The Drew Barrymore Show; Good Morning America; The Jennifer Hudson Show; Live with Kelly and Mark; Sherri; Today; The View	**The Tonight Show Starring Jimmy Fallon**; The Daily Show; Hart to Heart; Jimmy Kimmel Live!; Last Week Tonight with John Oliver; Late Night with Seth Meyers; The Late Show with Stephen Colbert; Watch What Happens Live with Andy Cohen
The Host of the Year
**Jimmy Fallon – That's My Jam**; Nick Cannon – The Masked Singer; Terry Crews – America's Got Talent; Steve Harvey – Celebrity Family Feud; Padma Lakshmi – Top Chef; Gordon Ramsay – Hell's Kitchen; RuPaul – RuPaul's Drag Race; Ryan Seacrest – American Idol

=== Music ===
The Male Artist of the Year	The Female Artist of the Year
**Jungkook**; Bad Bunny; Luke Combs; Drake; Jack Harlow; Post Malone; Morgan Wallen; The Weeknd	**Taylor Swift**; Beyoncé; Miley Cyrus; Doja Cat; Karol G; Nicki Minaj; Olivia Rodrigo; Lainey Wilson
The Group/Duo of the Year	The Song of the Year
**Stray Kids**; Dan + Shay; Fuerza Regida; Grupo Frontera; Jonas Brothers; Old Dominion; Paramore; Tomorrow X Together	**"Vampire" – Olivia Rodrigo**; "Dance the Night" – Dua Lipa; "Fast Car" – Luke Combs; "Flowers" – Miley Cyrus; "FukUMean" – Gunna; "Greedy" – Tate McRae; "Last Night" – Morgan Wallen; "Paint the Town Red" – Doja Cat
The Album of the Year	The Male Country Artist of the Year
**Guts – Olivia Rodrigo**; Endless Summer Vacation – Miley Cyrus; For All the Dogs – Drake; Gettin' Old – Luke Combs; Mañana Será Bonito – Karol G; Nadie Sabe Lo Que Va a Pasar Mañana – Bad Bunny; One Thing at a Time – Morgan Wallen; Pink Friday 2 – Nicki Minaj	**Jelly Roll**; Kane Brown; Zach Bryan; Luke Combs; Hardy; Cody Johnson; Chris Stapleton; Morgan Wallen
The Female Country Artist of the Year	The Male Latin Artist of the Year
**Lainey Wilson**; Kelsea Ballerini; Gabby Barrett; Ashley McBryde; Megan Moroney; Carly Pearce; Shania Twain; Carrie Underwood	**Bad Bunny**; Rauw Alejandro; Bizarrap; Feid; Maluma; Ozuna; Peso Pluma; Manuel Turizo
The Female Latin Artist of the Year	The New Artist of the Year
**Shakira**; Ángela Aguilar; Anitta; Becky G; Karol G; Rosalía; Kali Uchis; Young Miko	**Ice Spice**; Jelly Roll; Jungkook; Coi Leray; Noah Kahan; Peso Pluma; PinkPantheress; Stephen Sanchez
The Collaboration Song of the Year	The Pop Artist of the Year
**"Barbie World" – Nicki Minaj & Ice Spice with Aqua**; "All My Life" – Lil Durk featuring J. Cole; "Ella Baila Sola" – Eslabon Armado X Peso Pluma; "First Person Shooter" – Drake featuring J. Cole; "I Remember Everything" – Zach Bryan featuring Kacey Musgraves; "Seven" – Jungkook featuring Latto; "TQG" – Karol G and Shakira; "Un x100to" – Grupo Frontera X Bad Bunny	**Taylor Swift**; Miley Cyrus; Doja Cat; Dua Lipa; Billie Eilish; Jungkook; Tate McRae; Olivia Rodrigo
The Hip-Hop Artist of the Year	The R&B Artist of the Year
**Nicki Minaj**; Cardi B; Drake; Future; Jack Harlow; Latto; Post Malone; Travis Scott	**Beyoncé**; Brent Faiyaz; Janelle Monáe; Victoria Monét; SZA; Tems; Usher; The Weeknd
The Concert Tour of the Year
**Taylor Swift – The Eras Tour**; Beyoncé – Renaissance World Tour; Coldplay – Music of the Spheres World Tour; Luke Combs – Luke Combs World Tour; P!nk – Summer Carnival; Ed Sheeran – +–=÷x Tour; Harry Styles – Love On Tour; Morgan Wallen – One Night at a Time World Tour

=== Pop culture ===
The Social Celebrity of the Year	The Comedy Act of the Year
**Taylor Swift**; Selena Gomez; Kylie Jenner; Dwayne Johnson; Kim Kardashian; Megan Thee Stallion; Nicki Minaj; Britney Spears	**Chris Rock – Selective Outrage (Netflix)**; Kevin Hart – Reality Check (Peacock); John Mulaney – Baby J (Netflix); Trevor Noah – Off The Record; Amy Schumer – Emergency Contact (Netflix); Sarah Silverman – Someone You Love (HBO); Wanda Sykes – I'm an Entertainer (Netflix); Marlon Wayans – God Loves Me (Max)
The Athlete of the Year
**Travis Kelce**; Giannis Antetokounmpo; Simone Biles; Stephen Curry; Coco Gauff; Sabrina Ionescu; LeBron James; Lionel Messi

=== Other awards ===
- **People's Icon Award** – **Adam Sandler**
- **Music Icon Award** – **Lenny Kravitz**

== Multiple nominations ==
Films with multiple nominations
Film	Nominations
Barbie	8
Oppenheimer	6
The Hunger Games: The Ballad of Songbirds & Snakes	5
Guardians of the Galaxy Vol. 3	4
Anyone but You	3
The Color Purple	3
Creed III	3
John Wick: Chapter 4	3
Killers of the Flower Moon	3
Leave the World Behind	3
The Little Mermaid	3
Mission: Impossible – Dead Reckoning Part One	3
No Hard Feelings	3
Scream VI	3
Wonka	3
Asteroid City	2
Fast X	2
The Marvels	2
May December	2

Television shows with multiple nominations
Show	Nominations
Only Murders in the Building	7
The Last of Us	6
The Morning Show	6
Ted Lasso	6
The Bear	5
Law & Order: Special Victims Unit	5
Beef	4
RuPaul's Drag Race	4
Abbott Elementary	3
American Idol	3
Dancing with the Stars	3
The Kardashians	3
Outer Banks	3
The Real Housewives of Beverly Hills	3
Saturday Night Live	3
Succession	3
Vanderpump Rules	3
Ahsoka	2
America's Got Talent	2
Grey's Anatomy	2
Jersey Shore: Family Vacation	2
Loki	2
Queen Charlotte: A Bridgerton Story	2
Secret Invasion	2
Selling Sunset	2
That's My Jam	2

== Multiple wins ==
Films with multiple wins
Film	Wins
Barbie	5
The Hunger Games: The Ballad of Songbirds & Snakes	2

Television shows with multiple wins
Show	Wins
The Kardashians	2
The Last of Us	2
Only Murders in the Building	2

Musicians with multiple wins
Artist	Wins
Taylor Swift	4
Nicki Minaj	2
Ice Spice	2
Olivia Rodrigo	2
