= Rice–Eccles Stadium =

Stadium at the University of Utah in Salt Lake City, Utah, USA

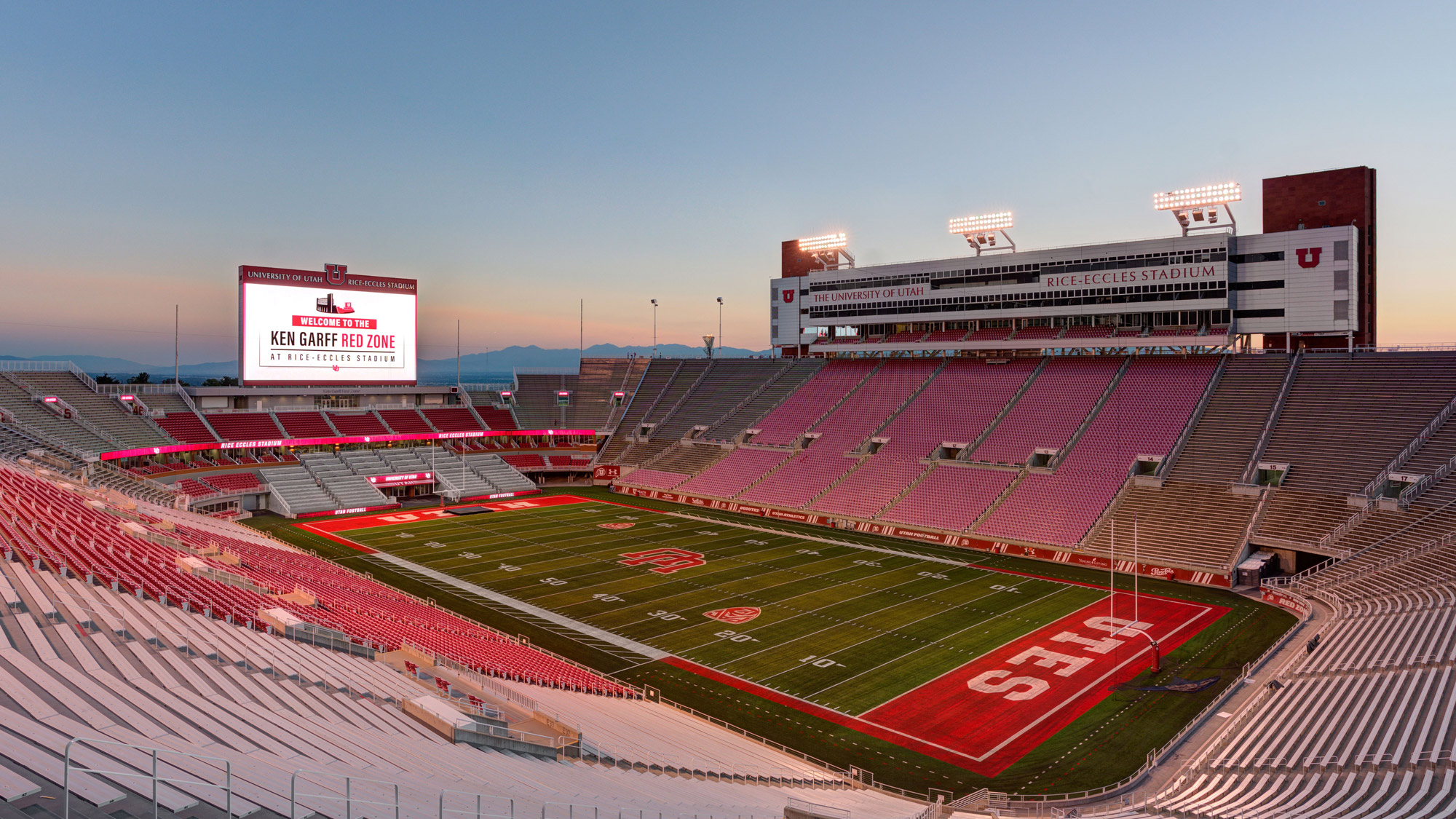
- View from northeast in 2021

- Location within the United States Location within Utah
- Interactive map of Rice–Eccles Stadium
- Address: 451 South 1400 East
- Location: University of Utah; Salt Lake City, Utah, U.S.
- Coordinates: 40°45′36″N 111°50′56″W
- Elevation: 4,637 feet (1,413 m) AMSL
- Owner: University of Utah
- Operator: University of Utah
- Capacity: 54,383 (2024–present) Former capacity: 45,807 (2014–2020); 45,017 (2003–2013); 45,634 (1998–2002)
- Executive suites: 25
- Surface: FieldTurf CoolPlay (2015–present); FieldTurf (2002–2015); Natural grass (2000–2001); Sportgrass (1998–1999)
- Record attendance: 109,618 November 21,2026 Michigan vs UCLA
- Public transit: at Stadium station

Construction
- Groundbreaking: June 1997
- Opened: September 12, 1998; 28 years ago
- Cost: US$50,000,000 (equivalent to $99,000,000 in 2025)
- Architect: FFKR Architects
- Structural engineer: Reaveley Engineers + Associates
- Services engineers: Van Boerum & Frank Associates, Inc.
- General contractor: Layton Construction

Tenants
- Utah Utes (NCAA) 1998–present; Real Salt Lake (MLS) 2005–2008; Salt Lake Stallions (AAF) 2019

Website
- stadium.utah.edu

Rice–Eccles Stadium is an outdoor college football stadium located on the campus of the University of Utah in Salt Lake City, Utah. It is the home field of the Utah Utes of the Big 12 Conference. It was built to serve as the stadium for the opening and closing ceremonies of 2002 Winter Olympics, a role it is expected to reprise for the 2034 Winter Olympics.

The FieldTurf playing field runs in the traditional north–south configuration at an elevation of 4,637 feet (1,413 m) above sea level, 400 feet (120 m) above downtown Salt Lake City.

== History ==
When Salt Lake City was awarded the 2002 Winter Olympics in June 1995, it was obvious that Robert Rice Stadium, the largest outdoor stadium in Salt Lake City, was not suitable to serve as the main stadium. The concrete, timber, and earth-fill facility was built in 1927 and had not aged well. In 1996, U of U athletic director Chris Hill announced plans to renovate Rice Stadium into a new facility that would be up to Olympic standards. It was initially expected to take three years to completely overhaul the facility.

However, in 1997, Spencer Eccles, a Utah alumnus and chairman of Utah's biggest bank, First Security Corporation (now part of Wells Fargo), announced that the George S. and Dolores Dore Eccles Foundation would donate $10 million toward the project. In recognition of this gift, the university received permission from the Eccles family to add George Eccles's name to the stadium alongside that of Robert L. Rice, who had funded the original renovation project to Rice Stadium in 1972. Before 1972, it was Ute Stadium, which opened in 1927 with a Utah win over Colorado Mines.

=== Renovations ===
Immediately after the 1997 season's final home game on November 15, fittingly a 31–14 victory over Rice, Rice Stadium was almost completely demolished, replaced with a modern steel, concrete and glass facility. All that remained of the old stadium were the stands in the south end zone, built in 1982. The stadium did not miss a football season, as the project was timed not to disrupt the 1997 home schedule. The new stadium was ready less than 10 months later for the 1998 home opener, a 45–22 win over Louisville on September 12. The stadium then seated 45,017, plus a new six-story press box.

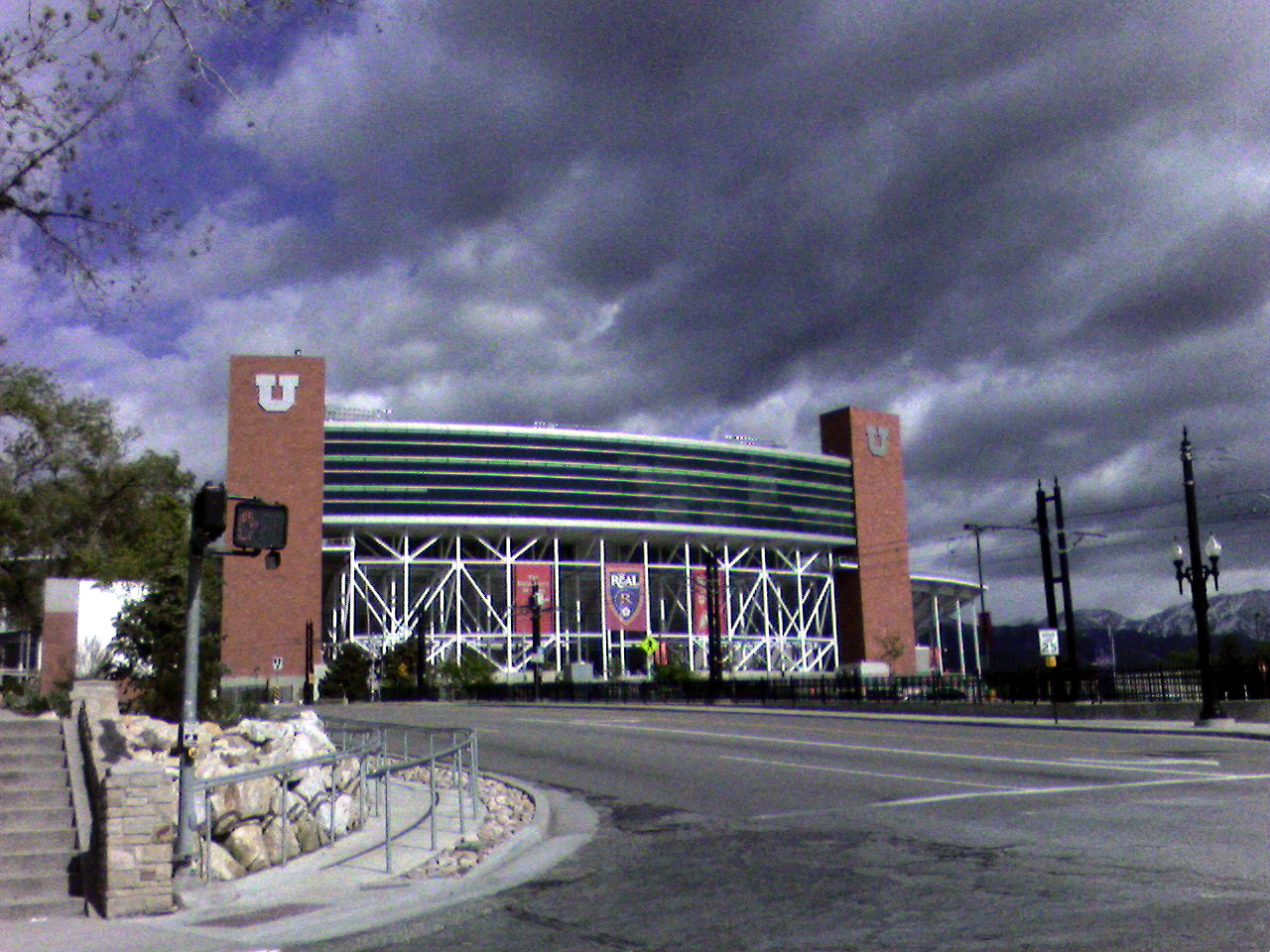
Exterior view and entrance in 2007

In 2014, a row of bleachers was added in the standing room areas on the east, west, and north sections of Rice–Eccles Stadium. Forty ADA seats were also added for a total of 790 new seats, increasing capacity to 45,807, plus additional space for standing room behind the new row of bleachers.

In June 2010, the U of U accepted an invitation to join the Pacific-10 Conference (which changed its name to the Pac-12 Conference shortly after the Utah Utes and the Colorado Buffaloes joined) and began playing in the conference during 2011–2012 season. Claims that Rice–Eccles would again be expanded and the locker room facilities upgraded were furthered when both KSL.com and the Deseret News reported that the university was seriously considering expanding the stadium by at least 10,000 seats, which would bring the expected capacity to 51,444.

In 2019, the University announced a renovation of the seating at the south end zone. The announced renovation was planned to add 6,000 more seats, high-end suites, locker rooms, offices, terrace seating, and a restaurant, all for $80 million. The Ken Garff Family donated $17.5 million and the section was named the "Ken Garff Red Zone" in his honor. Construction on the South End Zone was completed on August 12, 2021, and opened to the public that season. After construction, the stadium's capacity had increased by 5,637 seats.

The Ken Garff Red Zone features new home and visiting locker rooms, sports medicine facilities and hospitality areas, the University Club restaurant, Diglisic Lounge, Layton Field Club, and various premium seating options, including suites, loge boxes, ledge, club, and premium terrace seating as well as additional bleacher seating. Utah’s new locker room is 5,300 square feet with 90 lockers. It features a one-of-a-kind locker design with hidden storage, wireless charging, and a locking box for athletes.

== Features ==
=== Olympic Cauldron Park ===
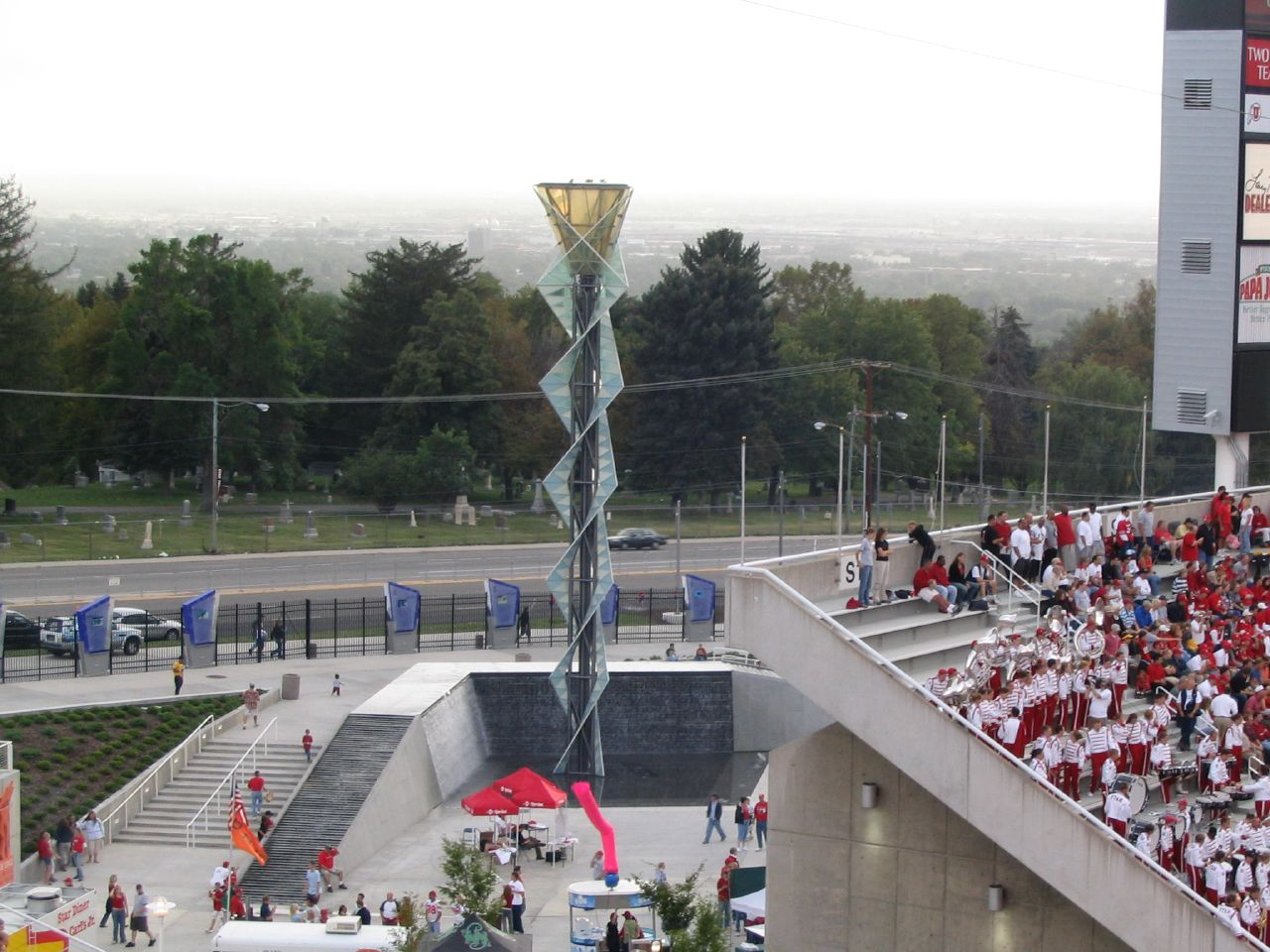
Olympic Cauldron Park pictured in 2004

Immediately south of the stadium was the Salt Lake 2002 Olympic Cauldron Park, which contained a 2002 Winter Olympic museum, the Olympic cauldron, and other memorabilia from the games. Only the cauldron remains at the stadium today; the museum and other memorabilia have all since been removed. Hoberman Arch was located until its removal in October 2014. The cauldron has undergone refurbishment and was relocated to a new Olympic plaza at the Southwest corner outside the stadium, just west of the South Endzone expansion.

=== Playing surface ===
Since 2002, the playing field at Rice–Eccles Stadium has been FieldTurf. It was most recently replaced in 2015.

When the stadium reopened in 1998, its surface was SportGrass, a hybrid of natural grass and artificial turf. Earlier, Rice Stadium had been among the first facilities to use SportGrass. A full natural grass was installed in 2000 for two seasons, then was covered by asphalt blacktop for the opening and closing ceremonies of the 2002 Winter Olympics.

It was the second-highest field in the Pac-12, about 700 feet (210 m) lower than Colorado's Folsom Field in Boulder, and over 2,000 feet (610 m) above the third-highest, Washington State's Martin Stadium in Pullman. After moving to the Big 12 Conference in 2024, Colorado and Utah again have the two highest fields in the conference.

== Events ==
=== 2002 Winter Olympics and Paralympics ===
During the 2002 Winter Olympics, the stadium served as the venue for the opening ceremony on February 8, 2002, and for the closing ceremony on February 24, 2002. To host the ceremonies, the grass field was paved over with asphalt and a stage was constructed, scoreboards were removed, flags and Olympic livery were installed, temporary seating was brought in (allowing more than 50,000 spectators), and the 2002 Olympic cauldron was installed atop the southern bleachers.

For the duration of the games, the stadium was temporarily renamed the Rice–Eccles Olympic Stadium. Through broadcasts from the stadium, an estimated 3.5 billion people worldwide watched the opening and closing ceremonies on television.

The opening ceremony of the 2002 Winter Paralympics was also held in the stadium on March 7, 2002. The corresponding closing ceremony followed suit on March 16, 2002.

=== 2027 NHL Winter Classic ===
On January 7, 2026, the National Hockey League and Smith Entertainment Group announced that the Utah Mammoth ice hockey team would host the 2027 NHL Winter Classic at the stadium, pitting them against their Rocky Mountain rivals, the Colorado Avalanche. The Mammoth will become the final active NHL team to host or be involved in an outdoor game.

=== 2034 Winter Olympics and Paralympics ===
During the 2034 Winter Olympics and Paralympics, the stadium is expected to host the opening and closing ceremonies for the second time.

=== Concerts ===
Date	Headline artist	Opening act(s)	Tour / Concert name	Attend.	Revenue	Notes
June 17, 2000	NSYNC	Pink	No Strings Attached Tour			
May 24, 2011	U2	The Fray	360° Tour	47,710	$3,029,760	Postponed from June 3, 2010, due to Bono's emergency back surgery.
July 28, 2018	Imagine Dragons	Grace VanderWaal; Zedd; Mike Shinoda; Tyler Glenn; Vagabon; A.W. Cameron Esposito	LoveLoud2018; Evolve World Tour			
July 17, 2021	Garth Brooks	—N/a	The Garth Brooks Stadium Tour			
June 17, 2022	Garth Brooks	Mitch Rossell	The Garth Brooks Stadium Tour			
June 18, 2022	Garth Brooks		The Garth Brooks Stadium Tour			
August 5, 2022	Imagine Dragons	Macklemore; Kings Elliot	Mercury World Tour	36,071	$2,893,663	
June 7, 2024	Luke Combs	Cody Jinks; Charles Wesley Godwin; Hailey Whitters; The Wilder Blue	Growin' Up and Gettin' Old Tour	73,339	$7,500,000	
June 8, 2024	Luke Combs	Colby Acuff; Drew Parker; Mitchell Tenpenny; Jordan Davis	Growin' Up and Gettin' Old Tour		$6,800,000	
June 29, 2024	George Strait	Chris Stapleton; Little Big Town	Stadium Tour	50,000+		
April 29, 2025	Post Malone	Sierra Ferrell; Jelly Roll	Big Ass Stadium Tour	40,551	$6,204,677	
July 28, 2026	Post Malone	Carter Faith; Jelly Roll	Big Ass Stadium Tour II	~40,500+		
August 7, 2026	Zach Bryan	MJ Lenderman; Fey Fili	With Heaven on Tour			
June 19, 2027	Metallica	Limp Bizkit; Avatar	M72 World Tour			

=== Real Salt Lake ===
Rice–Eccles Stadium was also the home field of the Major League Soccer franchise Real Salt Lake from 2005 until October 2008, when Rio Tinto Stadium was opened in the suburb of Sandy, south of Salt Lake City.

=== Utah Utes ===
Rice–Eccles Stadium replaced Robert Rice Stadium, the former home field of the Utah Utes football team. The first Utes game at the stadium was a 45–22 victory over the Louisville Cardinals held on September 12, 1998, with 44,112 in attendance. The Utes have a 120-41 (.745) record at the stadium through the 2024 season.

=== Salt Lake Stallions ===
The Salt Lake Stallions of the Alliance of American Football (AAF) played at Rice–Eccles Stadium during the league's lone season in 2019.

=== Other events ===
The stadium hosted a round of the AMA Supercross Championship from 2001 to 2004, 2009 to 2013, and again in 2017. In 2020, it hosted the final seven rounds of the series in a “COVID-19 bubble” with no fans being allowed in the stands. Since 2021, Rice–Eccles Stadium has been the home of the Championship round of the series.

Rice–Eccles Stadium hosted its first Monster Jam event in 2022. The series then stopped by every year the week before the Monster Energy Supercross championship took place in the same stadium. In May 2024 it was announced that the stadium would host Monster Jam World Finals 24 in 2025. Mexico played against Switzerland for an international soccer friendly on June 7, 2025 where they lost 4–2 in front of 41,000 fans.

The Monster Jam World Finals XXIV and XXV were held at the stadium in July 2025 and 2026.

== Gallery ==
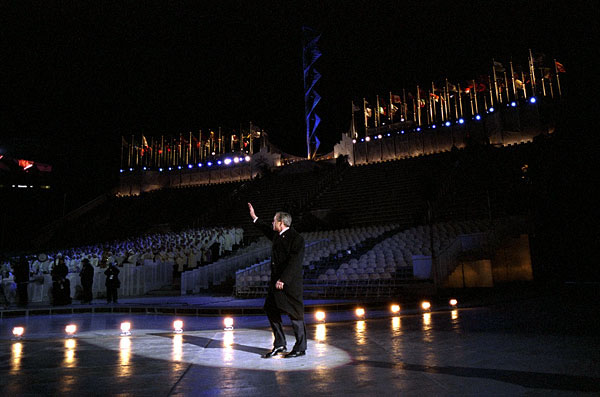
George W. Bush at the 2002 Winter Games opening ceremonies

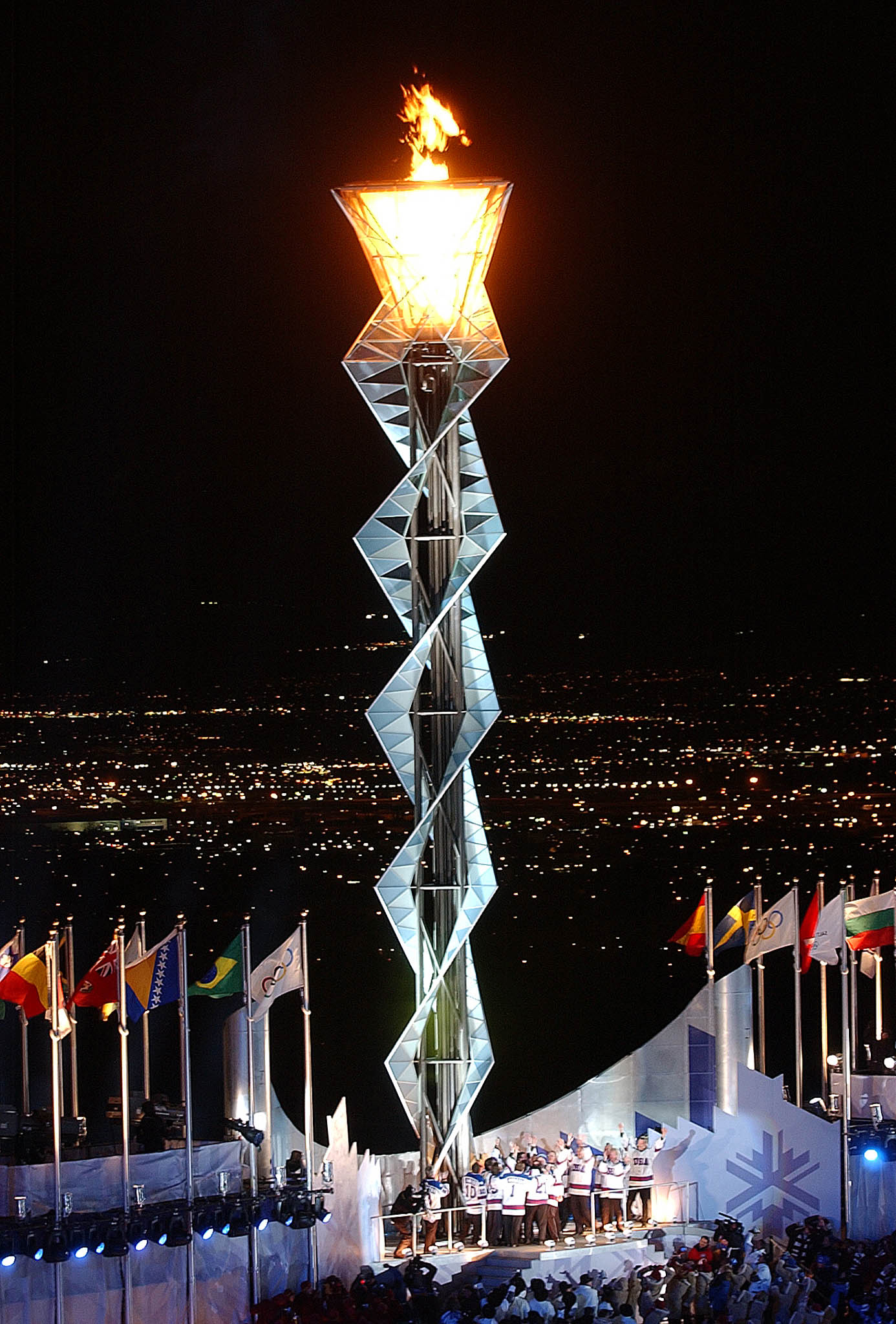
Olympic flame during the 2002 Games

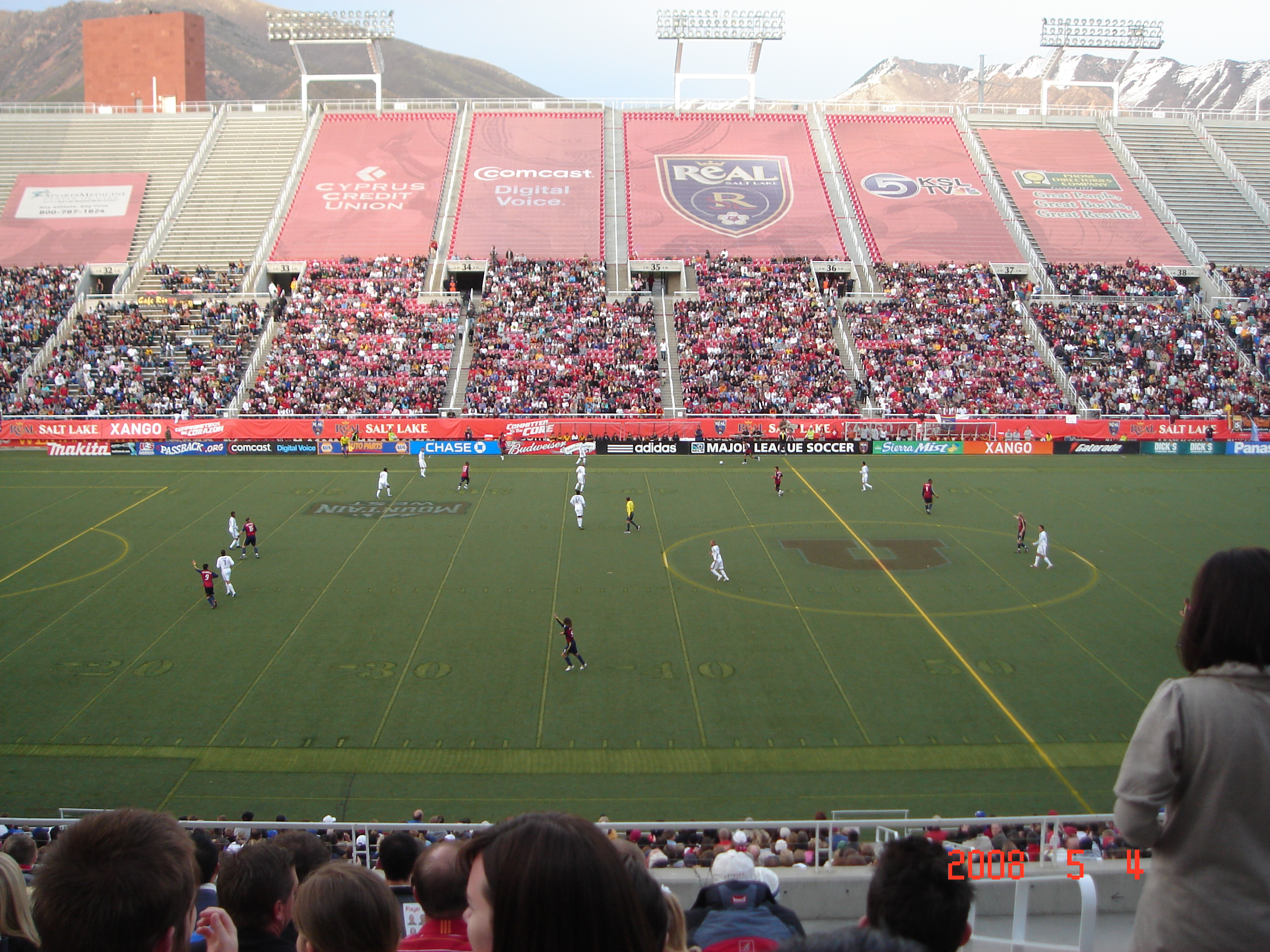
Real Salt Lake v LA Galaxy soccer, May 2008

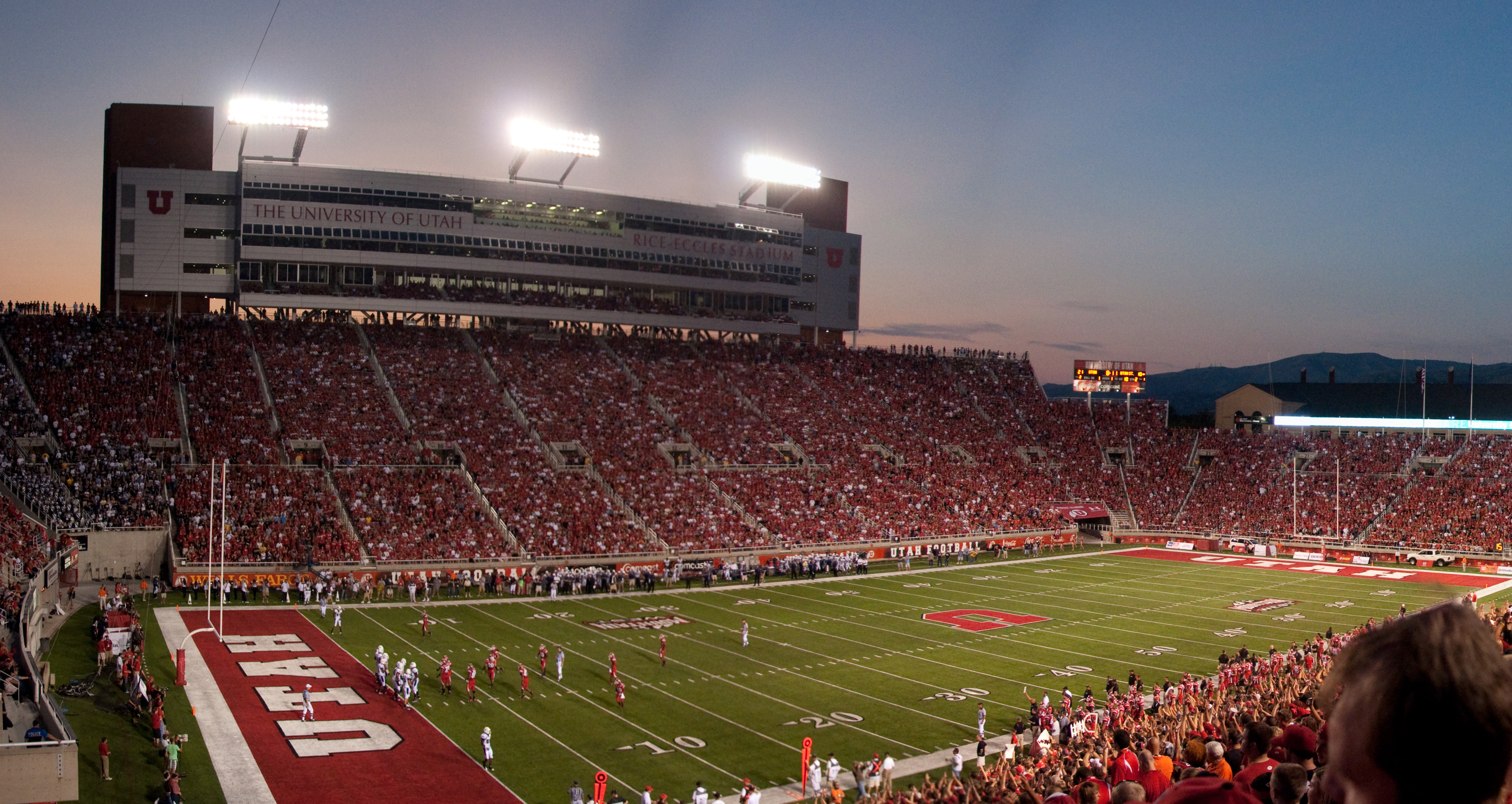
Utah v Utah State football, September 2009

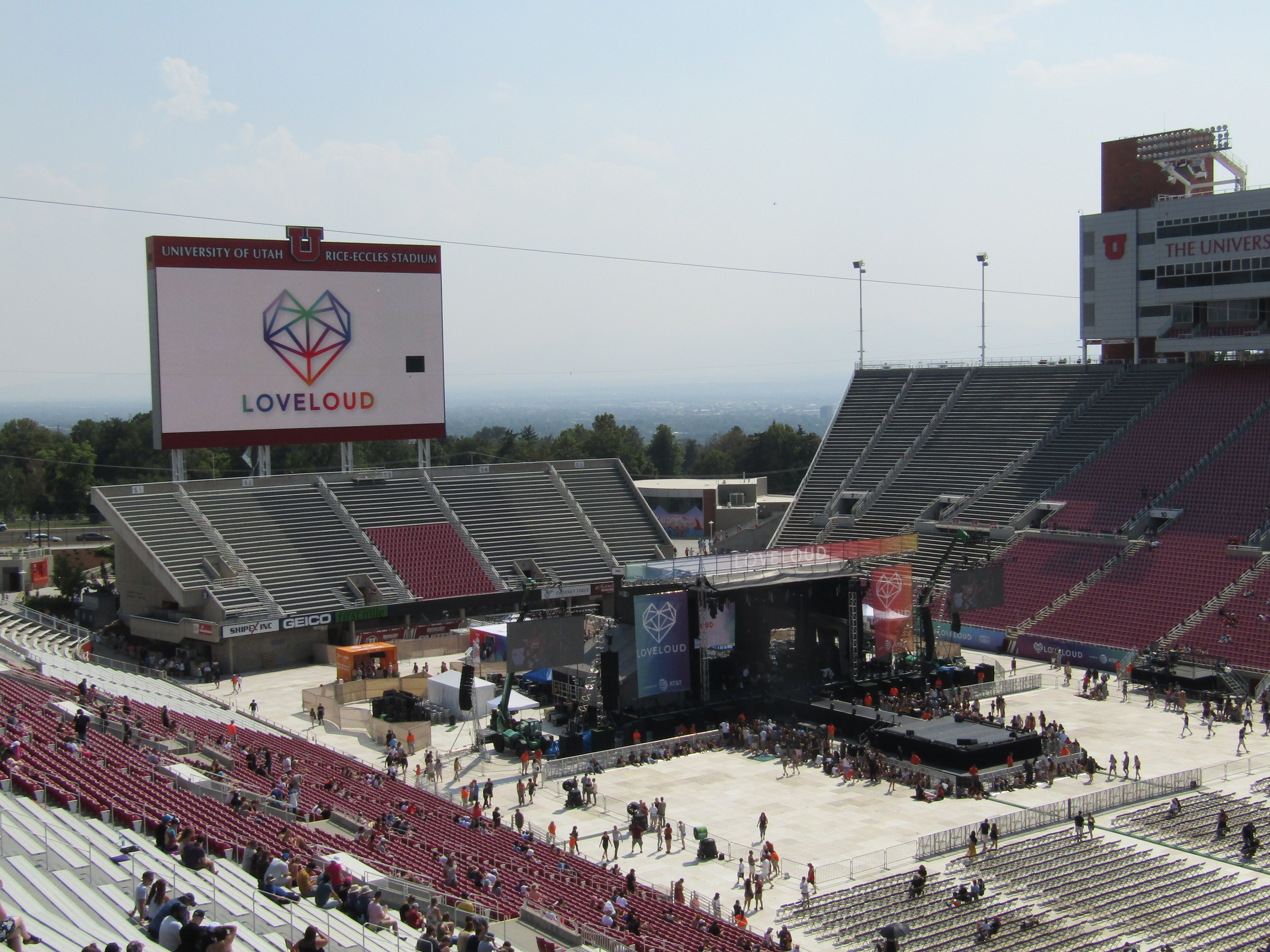
Stage of LoveLoud 2018

== Attendance records ==
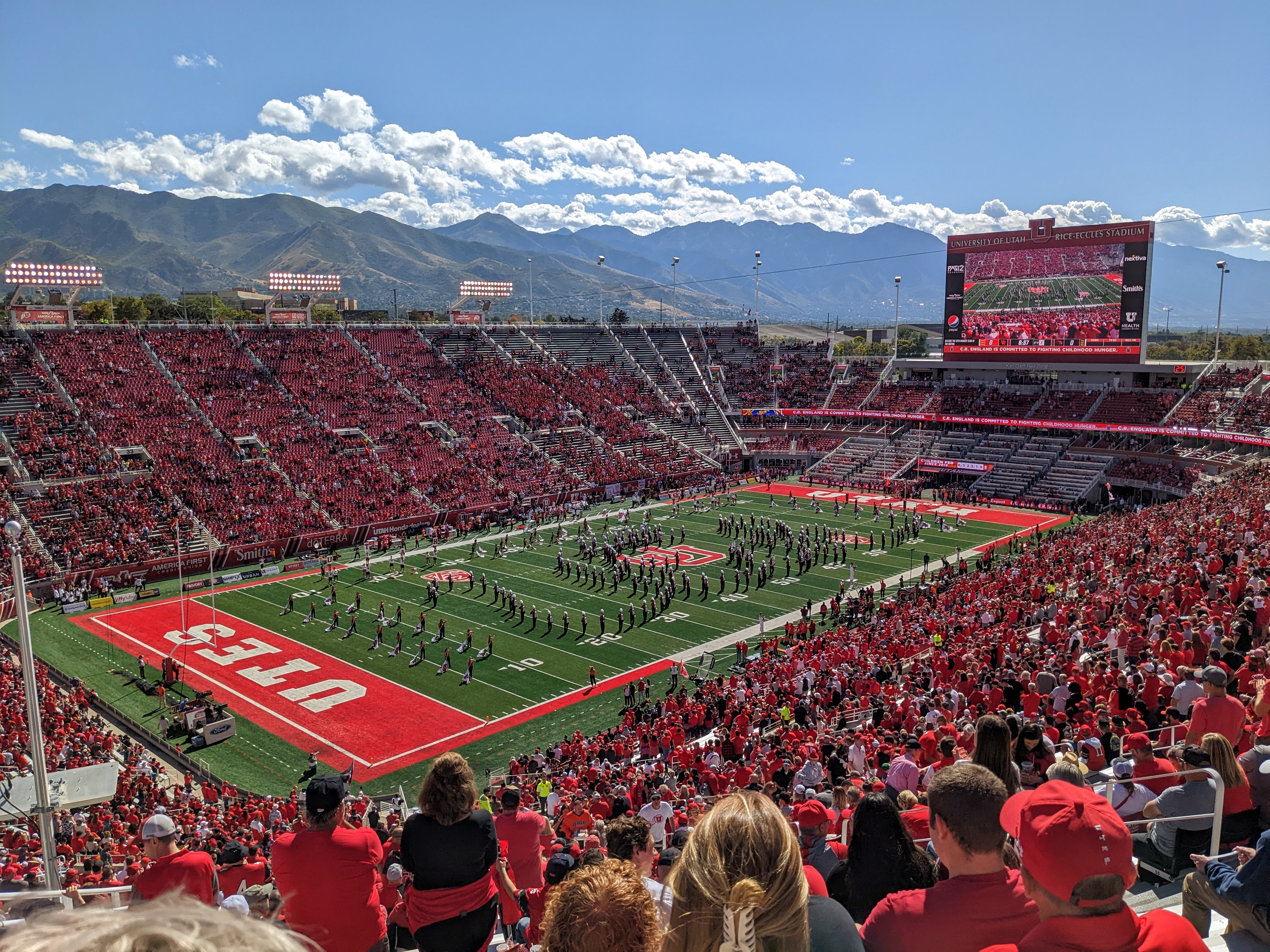
Ken Garff South End Zone as seen in October 2022

Rice–Eccles Stadium football attendance records
Attendance records
Rank	Date	Time	Opponent	Result	Attendance
1	November 9, 2024	7:30 pm	#9 BYU	L 22–21	54,383
2	August 31, 2023	5:00 pm	Florida	W 24–11	53,644
3	October 15, 2022	6:00 pm	#7 USC	W 43–42	53,609
4	October 28, 2023	1:30 pm	#7 Oregon	L 35–6	53,586
5	October 19, 2024	8:30 pm	TCU	L 13–7	53,299
6	September 23, 2023	1:30 pm	#22 UCLA	W 14–7	52,919
7	September 28, 2024	8:15 pm	Arizona	L 23–10	52,898
8	September 7, 2024	1:30 pm	Baylor	W 23–12	52,827
9	November 20, 2021	5:30 pm	#3 Oregon	W 38–7	52,724
10	September 20, 2025	10:00 am	#17 Texas Tech	L 34–10	52,236
11	August 29, 2024	7:00 pm	Southern Utah	W 49–0	52,210
12	October 14, 2023	1:00 pm	California	W 34–14	52,115
13	November 4, 2023	12:00 pm	Arizona State	W 55–3	52,104
14	October 30, 2021	8:00 pm	UCLA	W 44–24	51,922
15	October 1, 2022	12:00 pm	Oregon State	W 42–16	51,729
16	October 16, 2021	8:00 pm	#18 Arizona State	W 35–21	51,724
17	September 17, 2022	8:00 pm	San Diego State	W 35–7	51,602
18	November 25, 2023	1:00 pm	Colorado	W 40–17	51,511
19	November 26, 2021	2:00 pm	Colorado	W 23–17	51,595
20	September 16 , 2023	12:00 pm	Weber State	W 31–7	51,532
21	September 10, 2022	11:30 am	Southern Utah	W 73–7	51,531

== See also ==
- List of NCAA Division I FBS football stadiums

Preceded by Nagano Olympic Stadium; Nagano	Winter Olympics; Opening and Closing Ceremonies (Olympic Stadium); 2002	Succeeded by Stadio Olimpico Grande Torino; Turin
Preceded by Allianz Riviera; Nice	Winter Olympics; Opening and Closing Ceremonies (Olympic Stadium); 2034	Succeeded by TBD
Preceded by N/A (first stadium)	Home of Real Salt Lake; 2005–2008	Succeeded by Rio Tinto Stadium
