= Love You Anyway =

Love You Anyway may refer to:

- "Love You Anyway" (Boyzone song)
- "Love You Anyway" (Luke Combs song)
