= Drew Parker (musician) =

- Origin: Covington, Georgia
- Genre: Country
- Occupation: Singer-songwriter
- Label: Warner Music Nashville
- Spouse: Mallory Sauls Parker
- Website: www.drewparkermusic.com

Drew Parker is an American country singer-songwriter. He has released two EPs and one LP under Warner Music Nashville and charted for his song "While You're Gone." He has co-written numerous songs which have peaked at No. 1 and also received a Grammy Award nomination for co-writing the song "Doin' This."

== Early life and education ==
Parker is originally from Covington, Georgia and grew up singing in church. As a senior in high school, he began singing country music at open mic nights. He released several gospel CDs while in high school and also won the Male Vocalist and Entertainer of the Year Award from the Georgia Country and Gospel Music Association in 2008. He moved to Nashville, Tennessee at the age of 24 where he began to write for country musician Luke Combs.

== Career ==
Parker co-wrote the song "Homemade" for Jake Owen in 2019. The song went on to peak at No. 1 on both the Billboard Country Music and US Country Airplay charts. The following year he signed with Warner Music Nashville and released the EP While You're Gone. The self-titled single from the EP peaked at No. 40 on the US Country Airplay chart. He also co-wrote the Luke Combs song "Forever After All" which was certified 5× Platinum and earned him the BMI Country Award for Song of the Year in 2022. In 2021, he went on tour with Combs as his opening act. He also co-write the songs "1, 2 Many" and "Nothing Like You," and received a Grammy Award nomination in 2022 for co-writing the song "Doin' This."

Parker began his headline tour ("At The End of the Dirt Road") in 2023. The same year he released an EP with the same title.

== Personal life ==
Parker lives in Nashville, Tennessee with his wife Mallory. with two daughters

== Discography ==
=== Extended plays ===
Title	Album details
While You're Gone	Release date: 2020; Label: Warner Music Nashville
At the End of the Dirt Road	Release date: 2023; Label: Warner Music Nashville

=== Singles ===
Year	Title	Peak chart positions	Album
Year	Title	US Country Airplay	Album
2021	"While You're Gone"	42	While You're Gone
2024	"Love the Leavin'"	50	Camouflage Cowboy
