= Doin' This =

2021 single by Luke Combs

Single by Luke Combs

from the album Growin' Up
- Released: November 10, 2021
- Genre: Country
- Length: 4:14
- Label: River House; Columbia Nashville
- Songwriters: Drew Parker; Luke Combs; Robert Williford
- Producers: Luke Combs; Chip Matthews; Jonathan Singleton

Luke Combs singles chronology
"Cold as You" (2021)	"Doin' This" (2021)	"The Kind of Love We Make" (2022)

Music video
- "Doin' This" on YouTube

"Doin' This" is a song by American country music singer Luke Combs. It was released on November 10, 2021, via River House and Columbia Nashville after he debuted the song on the CMA Awards, and after it charted from unsolicited airplay for several months, it was officially promoted on February 7, 2022, as the lead single from his third studio album Growin' Up. Combs co-wrote the song with Drew Parker and Robert Williford, and produced it with Chip Matthews and Jonathan Singleton.

== Background ==
Combs released "Doin' This" after he performed at the 2021 CMA Awards. In a press release, Combs stated that regardless how much money or success he had, singing and songwriting was "always the plan for his life": "There was never a plan B. Once I decided that this is what I was gonna do, it's what I was gonna do whether that was at this level or at the level that I was at when I started. Music is the thing that I think makes everybody who does what I do's blood pump and gets them out of bed in the morning, and just to be able to do that and write a song about it that you feel like genuinely can connect with some of your peers is really cool".

== Content ==
Jon Freeman of Rolling Stone described the song as "an ode to making music regardless of any fame or riches". Tricia Despres of Taste of Country stated that the lyrics means "whether he was playing in some no-name town or on the stage of the Grand Ole Opry, Combs would be doing exactly this: Playing music for all who will listen".

== Music video ==
TA Films created the music video for "Doin' This." The video takes a "behind the scenes" approach, with a director asking Combs "If you could be doing anything, what would you be doing if you weren't doing this?" The question prompts Combs to "recall a time when a journalist asked him the very same question during an interview". Combs then goes on to tease a stadium tour and introduce his friend Adam Church, who will be joining him on his tour. Church, who is also a country music singer, attended Appalachian State University in Boone, North Carolina with Combs and McLonghorn. Combs stated to Taste of Country that Church is "a married father with an ordinary 9 to 5 kind of job who also fills up bars in western Carolina. He's a pretty big deal in Boone, N.C". The other parts show "the life of a small-town guy who never made it big", who, at the end of the video, "winds up sitting on his couch with his acoustic guitar and playing a show for two VIPS — his wife and young daughter" before Combs "welcomes him out onto a big stage to perform with him".

== Chart performance ==
"Doin' This" peaked at number one on the Billboard Country Airplay chart dated May 21, 2022, becoming Combs' fourteenth consecutive number one single on that chart, and also becoming the first single by a solo act in six weeks to reach the top of the chart, as the previous four chart-toppers were collaborations.

== Charts ==
=== Weekly charts ===
Weekly chart performance for "Doin' This"
Chart (2021–2022)	Peak position
Australia (ARIA)	79
Canada Hot 100 (Billboard)	27
Canada Country (Billboard)	2
Global 200 (Billboard)	122
New Zealand Hot Singles (RMNZ)	28
US Billboard Hot 100	26
US Country Airplay (Billboard)	1
US Hot Country Songs (Billboard)	2

=== Year-end charts ===
2022 year-end chart performance for "Doin' This"
Chart (2022)	Position
Canada (Canadian Hot 100)	86
US Billboard Hot 100	71
US Country Airplay (Billboard)	36
US Hot Country Songs (Billboard)	12

== Certifications ==
Certifications for "Doin' This"
Region	Certification	Certified units/sales
Australia (ARIA)	Platinum	70,000^{‡}
New Zealand (RMNZ)	Gold	15,000^{‡}
United Kingdom (BPI)	Silver	200,000^{‡}
United States (RIAA)	2× Platinum	2,000,000^{‡}
^{‡} Sales+streaming figures based on certification alone.

== Release history ==
Release history for "Doin' This"
Region	Date	Format	Label	Ref.
Various	November 10, 2021	Digital download; streaming	River House; Columbia Nashville	
United States	February 7, 2022	Country radio	River House; Columbia Nashville	
