= Growin' Up (Luke Combs album) =

Studio album by Luke Combs
- Released: June 24, 2022
- Genre: Country
- Length: 41:23
- Labels: Columbia; River House
- Producers: Luke Combs; Chip Matthews; Jonathan Singleton

Luke Combs chronology
What You See Is What You Get (2019)	Growin' Up (2022)	Gettin' Old (2023)

Singles from Growin' Up
- 1. "Doin' This" Released: November 10, 2021; 2. "The Kind of Love We Make" Released: June 17, 2022; 3. "Going, Going, Gone" Released: October 24, 2022

Growin' Up is the third studio album by American country music artist Luke Combs. It was released on June 24, 2022, through Columbia Records Nashville and River House Records. The album includes the singles "Doin' This", "The Kind of Love We Make" and "Going, Going, Gone". It was nominated for Best Country Album at the 65th Annual Grammy Awards. The album reached the top ten in Canada, Australia, New Zealand, Scotland, the United Kingdom and the United States.

== Background ==
Combs confirmed the album's track listing on May 17, 2022. The album consists of twelve tracks, including lead single "Doin' This" which went to number one on Billboard Country Airplay earlier in 2022. The second single "The Kind of Love We Make" was released in June 2022, and reached a peak of number 2 on the Country Airplay chart, becoming Combs' first single to miss number one on that chart. The album also features a duet with Miranda Lambert on "Outrunnin' Your Memory". Combs wrote the album's songs over a two-year period, and worked with Chip Matthews and Jonathan Singleton as producers.

== Critical reception ==
The album received generally positive reviews.

Professional ratings
Review scores
Source	Rating
AllMusic	4.5/5 stars
Entertainment Focus	4.5/5 stars
Holler	7/10
Rolling Stone	3.5/5 stars

== Commercial performance ==
Growin' Up debuted at number two on the US Billboard 200 with 74,000 album-equivalent units, of which 28,000 were pure album sales. It is Combs' fourth top-five album in the US, and the highest debut for a country album in 2022.

== Track listing ==
All tracks are written by Luke Combs, with additional co-writers as noted.

Growin' Up track listing
No.	Title	Writer(s)	Length
1.	"Doin' This"	Drew Parker; Robert Williford	4:14
2.	"Any Given Friday Night"	Randy Montana; Jonathan Singleton	3:13
3.	"The Kind of Love We Make"	Jamie Davis; Dan Isbell; Reid Isbell	3:44
4.	"On the Other Line"	Thomas Archer; D. Isbell; James McNair; Montana	2:55
5.	"Outrunnin' Your Memory" (with Miranda Lambert)	Miranda Lambert; D. Isbell	4:14
6.	"Used to Wish I Was"	Deric Ruttan; Singleton	2:58
7.	"Better Back When"	Ray Fulcher; D. Isbell; Montana	3:23
8.	"Tomorrow Me"	Dean Dillon; Fulcher	3:28
9.	"Ain't Far from It"	Fulcher; D. Isbell; R. Isbell	3:37
10.	"Call Me"	Shane Minor; Singleton	3:20
11.	"Middle of Somewhere"	Montana; Singleton	3:20
12.	"Going, Going, Gone"	Fulcher; McNair	2:57

== Personnel ==
- Jim "Moose" Brown – keyboards
- Luke Combs – lead vocals, acoustic guitar on "Going, Going, Gone"
- Jon Conley – acoustic guitar
- Billy Justineau – keyboards
- Miranda Lambert – duet vocals on "Outrunnin' Your Memory"
- Steve Mackey – bass guitar
- Chip Matthews – electric guitar, keyboards, percussion, programming, background vocals
- Rob McNelley – electric guitar
- Greg Morrow – drums
- Gary Morse – pedal steel guitar
- Sol Philcox-Littlefield – electric guitar
- Jerry Roe – drums
- Scotty Sanders – pedal steel guitar
- Adam Shoenfeld – electric guitar
- Jonathan Singleton – bass guitar, electric guitar, background vocals
- Travis Toy – pedal steel guitar
- Mike Waldron – acoustic guitar, electric guitar
- Charlie Worsham – acoustic guitar
- Derek Wells – electric guitar

== Charts ==
=== Weekly charts ===
Weekly chart performance for Growin' Up
Chart (2022)	Peak position
Australian Albums (ARIA)	2
Australian Country Albums (ARIA)	1
Canadian Albums (Billboard)	2
Irish Albums (Official Charts)	36
New Zealand Albums (RMNZ)	9
Norwegian Albums (VG-lista)	33
Scottish Albums (Official Charts)	5
Swiss Albums (Schweizer Hitparade)	53
UK Albums (Official Charts)	9
UK Country Albums (Official Charts)	1
US Billboard 200	2
US Top Country Albums (Billboard)	1

=== Year-end charts ===
2022 year-end chart performance for Growin' Up
Chart (2022)	Position
Australian Albums (ARIA)	32
US Billboard 200	118
US Top Country Albums (Billboard)	12

2023 year-end chart performance for Growin' Up
Chart (2023)	Position
Australian Albums (ARIA)	53
Canadian Albums (Billboard)	25
US Billboard 200	46
US Top Country Albums (Billboard)	11

2024 year-end chart performance for Growin' Up
Chart (2024)	Position
Australian Country Albums (ARIA)	19
US Top Country Albums (Billboard)	35

== Certifications ==
Certifications and sales for Growin' Up
Region	Certification	Certified units/sales
Australia (ARIA)	Gold	35,000^{‡}
Canada (Music Canada)	2× Platinum	160,000^{‡}
New Zealand (RMNZ)	Gold	7,500^{‡}
United Kingdom (BPI)	Gold	100,000^{‡}
United States (RIAA)	Platinum	1,000,000^{‡}
^{‡} Sales+streaming figures based on certification alone.
