= Going, Going, Gone (Luke Combs song) =

- Acoustic version cover

Single by Luke Combs

from the album Growin' Up
- Released: October 24, 2022
- Genre: Country
- Length: 2:57
- Label: Columbia
- Songwriters: Luke Combs; Ray Fulcher; James McNair
- Producers: Luke Combs; Chip Matthews; Jonathan Singleton

Luke Combs singles chronology
"The Kind of Love We Make" (2022)	"Going, Going, Gone" (2022)	"Love You Anyway" (2023)

Music video
- "Going, Going, Gone" on YouTube

"Going, Going, Gone" is a song by American country music singer Luke Combs. It was released on October 24, 2022 as the third single from his third studio album Growin' Up. Combs wrote the song with Ray Fulcher and James McNair, and produced it with Chip Matthews and Jonathan Singleton.

== History ==
Combs wrote the song "Going, Going, Gone" with Ray Fulcher and James McNair. Combs said that he was inspired by Tracy Chapman's "Fast Car", as he thought the song had a memorable riff and he wanted to capture a similar mood. It is also the first song in his career where he plays his own guitar, instead of relying on session musicians. Combs said that he considered it one of his favorite songs. Clayton Edwards of Outsider thought it was conceptually different from Combs' earlier material, stating that "He’s done heartbreak songs before. However, he usually paired that pain with booze or a tell-off to the ex. This one, though, sees Combs accepting that his love is leaving." Following the song's release to radio in October 2022, Combs released an acoustic version two months later.

== Charts ==
=== Weekly charts ===
Weekly chart performance for "Going, Going, Gone"
Chart (2022–2023)	Peak position
Canada Hot 100 (Billboard)	32
Canada Country (Billboard)	1
Global 200 (Billboard)	144
US Billboard Hot 100	23
US Country Airplay (Billboard)	1
US Hot Country Songs (Billboard)	5

=== Year-end charts ===
2023 year-end chart performance for "Going, Going, Gone"
Chart (2023)	Position
Canada (Canadian Hot 100)	79
US Billboard Hot 100	59
US Country Airplay (Billboard)	7
US Hot Country Songs (Billboard)	17

== Certifications ==
Certifications for "Going, Going, Gone"
Region	Certification	Certified units/sales
Australia (ARIA)	Gold	35,000^{‡}
New Zealand (RMNZ)	Platinum	30,000^{‡}
United Kingdom (BPI)	Silver	200,000^{‡}
United States (RIAA)	3× Platinum	3,000,000^{‡}
^{‡} Sales+streaming figures based on certification alone.
