= The Kind of Love We Make =

Single by Luke Combs

from the album Growin' Up
- Released: June 16, 2022
- Genre: Country
- Length: 3:44
- Label: Columbia; River House
- Songwriters: Luke Combs; Jamie Davis; Dan Isbell; Reid Isbell
- Producers: Luke Combs; Chip Matthews; Jonathan Singleton

Luke Combs singles chronology
"Doin' This" (2022)	"The Kind of Love We Make" (2022)	"Going, Going, Gone" (2022)

Music video
- "The Kind of Love We Make" on YouTube

"The Kind of Love We Make" is a song by American country music singer Luke Combs. It was released in June 2022 as the second single from his third studio album Growin' Up. Combs wrote the song with Jamie Davis, Dan Isbell, and Reid Isbell, and co-produced it with Chip Matthews and Jonathan Singleton. It reached number eight on the US Billboard Hot 100.

== Content ==
Billy Dukes of Taste of Country described the song as Combs' "first bedroom song", comparing it favorably to the work of Billy Currington. He also described it as mixing a contemporary R&B sound with mainstream country music. Jon Freeman of Rolling Stone Country also compared it to Currington, calling it "a bit of a stylistic turn".

== Music video ==
The accompanying music video was released on June 16, 2022. It follows the parallel stories of an older and younger couple. The younger couple struggles to make time for each other due to their demanding schedules as a firefighter and a paramedic, until they are summoned to respond to a fire that has erupted at the older couple's home. The home was completely damaged, but miraculously the occupants were unharmed, likely not even aware of the fire due to getting lost in each other while dancing.

== Commercial performance ==
"The Kind of Love We Make" debuted at number 18 on the Billboard Country Airplay chart dated June 25, 2022. It is Combs' second-highest debut there after "Beer Never Broke My Heart", which debuted at number 15 in May 2019. The following week, it debuted at number two on the same publication's Hot Country Songs charts. This was also Combs' second-highest debut on that chart after "Forever After All", which debuted in the number one position in November 2020. Despite its high debut on the Country Airplay chart, it reached a peak of number two on that chart, having been blocked from the top by Cole Swindell's "She Had Me at Heads Carolina". With its peak at number two, it became Combs' first single to miss number one, and ended a record-breaking streak of thirteen consecutive career-opening number one singles that started with his debut single "Hurricane" in May 2017. It did, however, reach number one on the Hot Country Songs chart.

== Charts ==
=== Weekly charts ===
Weekly chart performance for "The Kind of Love We Make"
Chart (2022–2024)	Peak position
Australia (ARIA)	17
Canada Hot 100 (Billboard)	13
Canada AC (Billboard)	25
Canada Country (Billboard)	1
Estonia Airplay (TopHit)	47
Global 200 (Billboard)	38
Ireland (IRMA)	47
New Zealand (Recorded Music NZ)	26
UK Singles (Official Charts)	72
US Billboard Hot 100	8
US Country Airplay (Billboard)	2
US Hot Country Songs (Billboard)	1

=== Monthly charts ===
Monthly chart performance for "The Kind of Love We Make"
Chart (2024)	Peak position
Estonia Airplay (TopHit)	55

=== Year-end charts ===
2022 year-end chart performance for "The Kind of Love We Make"
Chart (2022)	Position
Australia (ARIA)	95
Canada (Canadian Hot 100)	33
Global 200 (Billboard)	163
US Billboard Hot 100	36
US Country Airplay (Billboard)	5
US Hot Country Songs (Billboard)	5

2023 year-end chart performance for "The Kind of Love We Make"
Chart (2023)	Position
Australia (ARIA)	22
Estonia Airplay (TopHit)	67
US Hot Country Songs (Billboard)	21
US Streaming Songs (Billboard)	37

== Certifications ==
Certifications for "The Kind of Love We Make"
Region	Certification	Certified units/sales
Australia (ARIA)	6× Platinum	420,000^{‡}
New Zealand (RMNZ)	2× Platinum	60,000^{‡}
United Kingdom (BPI)	Platinum	600,000^{‡}
United States (RIAA)	6× Platinum	6,000,000^{‡}
^{‡} Sales+streaming figures based on certification alone.
