= Colby Acuff =

American singer-songwriter

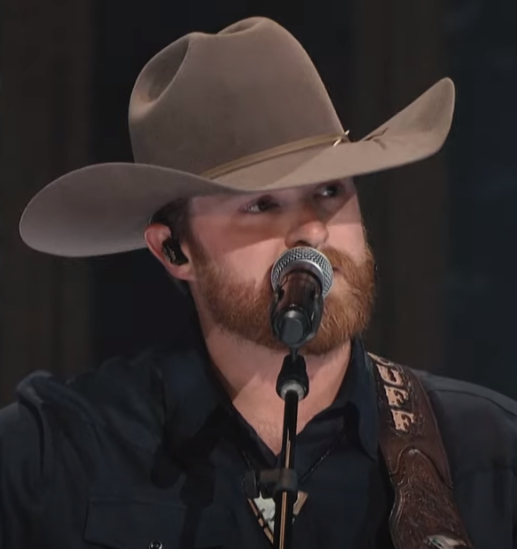

Background information
- Born: Colby Acuff; October 15, 1996 (age 30)
- Origin: Coeur d'Alene, Idaho
- Genres: Country; Honky-tonk
- Occupation: Singer-songwriter
- Instruments: Vocals; guitar; whistling
- Years active: 2020–present
- Label: Sony Music Nashville
- Website: https://www.colbyacuff.com

Colby Acuff (born October 15, 1996) is an American country singer-songwriter from Coeur d'Alene, Idaho. His major label debut album Western White Pines released just one month after signing to Sony in May 2023.

== Early life ==
Acuff was born and raised in Coeur d'Alene, Idaho. He is the son of Pat Acuff and Heidi Acuff. He grew up fishing, hunting, and learning how to play instruments at the age of 5.

He graduated from the University of Idaho in 2019. and was offered a job as a junior stockbroker but turned it down to pursue his musical career.

== Career ==
Acuff started performing when he was 12 years old.

Once he graduated high school, he continued doing local shows. Eventually releasing three independent albums from 2020 to 2022. This includes If I Were the Devil which went viral soon after its release.

His debut album, Life of a Rolling Stone, released on January 15, 2020. Due to COVID-19, his plans were put on hold. This led to him returning to his job as a fly-fishing guide at Orvis Northwest Outfitters and on the Columbia River.

On February 15, 2021, Acuff released If I Were the Devil, which amassed 6 million streams in the first 6 months of its release.

On May 5, 2023, Acuff announced he was signing to Sony Music Nashville. One month later, he released his first major label record, Western White Pines, on June 9, 2023.

On August 1, 2023, Acuff made his Grand Ole Opry debut.

On September 15, 2023, Acuff released Western White Pines (Deluxe), which is the deluxe version of his album Western White Pines and contains six additional songs.

On August 23, 2024, Acuff released his fifth album, American Son.

On October 3, 2025, Acuff released his sixth album, Enjoy the Ride.

In April 2026, Acuff won Whiskey Riff Madness, a 64-artist fan-vote bracket run by the country music website Whiskey Riff, after entering as the 16th seed.

In June 2026, Acuff released his seventh studio album, Handmade Horsepower.

== Discography ==
- Life of a Rolling Stone (2020)
- If I Were the Devil (2021)
- Honky Tonk Heaven (2022)
- Western White Pines (2023)
- American Son (2024)
- Enjoy the Ride (2025)
- Handmade Horsepower (2026)
