= Love You Anyway (Luke Combs song) =

Single by Luke Combs

from the album Gettin' Old
- Released: February 10, 2023
- Genre: Country
- Length: 3:49
- Label: Columbia Nashville
- Songwriters: Luke Combs; Ray Fulcher; Dan Isbell
- Producers: Luke Combs; Chip Matthews; Jonathan Singleton

Luke Combs singles chronology
"Going, Going, Gone" (2023)	"Love You Anyway" (2023)	"Fast Car" (2023)

Music video
- "Love You Anyway" on YouTube

"Love You Anyway" is a song by American country music singer Luke Combs. It released on February 10, 2023, as the lead single from his fourth studio album Gettin' Old.

== Content ==
In 2022, Combs wanted to write a song about his wife, Nicole, whom he married in 2020. He presented the idea during a writing session with his friend Dan Fulcher, who suggested the title "Love You Anyway" to him. Combs described the song as "very poetic". Jeremy Chua of Taste of Country thought the song had elements of the neotraditional country movement of the late 1980s and early 1990s, highlighting Combs' voice and the use of fiddle in particular.

== Chart performance ==
"Love You Anyway" reached number one on the Billboard Country Airplay chart dated September 9, 2023. The same week, Combs' own "Fast Car" sat at number two, making it the first time in that chart's history that the top two positions were simultaneously occupied by a solo act with no accompanying acts, and only the second time that such a distinction has been accomplished by any act overall. Additionally, it set a new record for the shortest timespan between number one singles by a lead artist, with a four-week span.

== Charts ==
=== Weekly charts ===
Weekly chart performance for "Love You Anyway"
Chart (2023)	Peak position
Australia (ARIA)	28
Canada Hot 100 (Billboard)	13
Canada Country (Billboard)	1
Global 200 (Billboard)	31
Ireland (IRMA)	23
New Zealand Hot Singles (RMNZ)	3
UK Singles (OCC)	62
US Billboard Hot 100	15
US Country Airplay (Billboard)	1
US Hot Country Songs (Billboard)	3

=== Year-end charts ===
Year-end chart performance for "Love You Anyway"
Chart (2023)	Position
Canada (Canadian Hot 100)	80
US Billboard Hot 100	36
US Country Airplay (Billboard)	18
US Hot Country Songs (Billboard)	12

== Certifications ==
Certifications for "Love You Anyway"
Region	Certification	Certified units/sales
Australia (ARIA)	Gold	35,000^{‡}
Canada (Music Canada)	Platinum	80,000^{‡}
New Zealand (RMNZ)	Gold	15,000^{‡}
United Kingdom (BPI)	Silver	200,000^{‡}
United States (RIAA)	3× Platinum	3,000,000^{‡}
^{‡} Sales+streaming figures based on certification alone.
