= Luke Combs =

American country singer (born 1990)

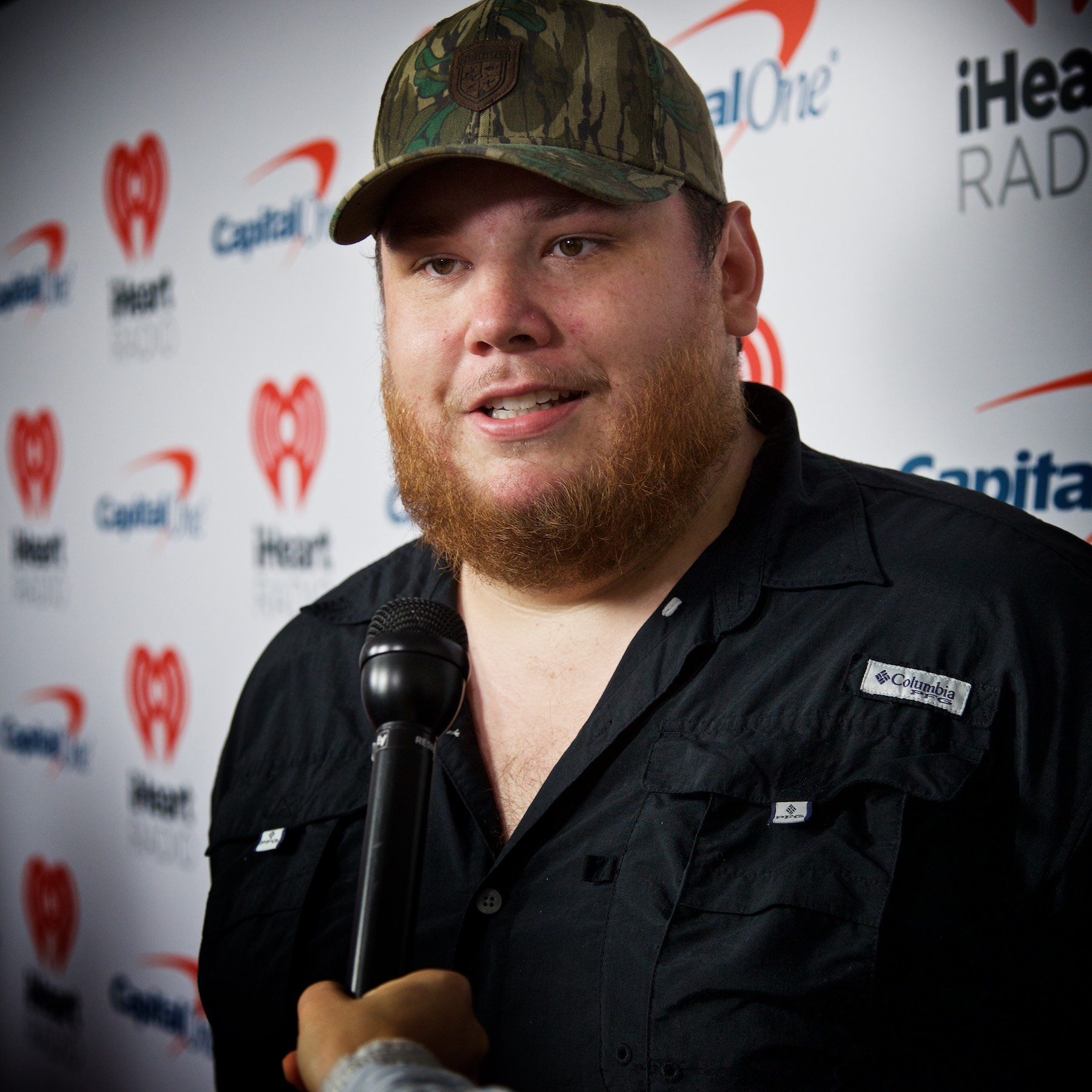
- Combs in 2019

Background information
- Born: Luke Albert Combs; March 2, 1990 (age 36); Huntersville, North Carolina, U.S.
- Genre: Country
- Occupations: Singer; songwriter; musician
- Instruments: Vocals; guitar
- Years active: 2014–present
- Labels: River House Artists; Columbia Nashville
- Spouse: Nicole Hocking (m. 2020)
- Website: lukecombs.com
- Awards: Full list

Luke Albert Combs (/koʊmz/; born March 2, 1990) is an American country singer. He was born in North Carolina and grew up there, performing as a child. After leaving college to pursue a career in music, he moved to Nashville and released his debut EP, The Way She Rides, in 2014.

In 2017, Combs released his debut album, This One's for You, which reached number four on the Billboard 200. His second album, What You See Is What You Get, was released in 2019 and topped the charts in multiple territories, becoming his first to accomplish that. He has received three Grammy Award nominations, two iHeart Radio music awards, four Academy of Country Music Awards, and six Country Music Association Awards including the 2021 and 2022 Entertainer of the Year award, their highest honor.

== Early life ==
Combs was born in Huntersville, North Carolina, a suburb of Charlotte on March 2, 1990, as the only child of Rhonda (née Frasure) and Lee Combs. The family moved to Asheville in Western North Carolina. As a child he performed in chorus class, multiple school musicals, and joined his church choir, which had the opportunity to perform at Carnegie Hall.

He attended Appalachian State University, where he studied business and later switched to criminal justice intending to be a homicide detective. While in college, he worked as a bouncer at a bar before being on stage in that same bar. Luke taught himself guitar on his mother's advice after dropping out of college.

He played his first country music show at the Parthenon Cafe in Boone, North Carolina. After five years and with 21 hours left on his degree, he dropped out to follow a country music career path. He later moved to Nashville pursuing more opportunities in music.

== Career ==
=== 2014–2019: Beginnings and This One's For You ===
Combs released his first EP, The Way She Rides, in February 2014. Later that year, he released his second EP, Can I Get an Outlaw. In November 2015 he released his third EP, This One's for You. In late 2016, he was named one of Sounds Like Nashville's "Artists to Watch". In 2016, his first single, "Hurricane", sold 15,000 copies in its first week, and debuted at number 46 on Hot Country Songs. He signed a deal with Sony Music Nashville, and the debut single from This One's for You, "Hurricane", was re-released on Columbia Nashville. "Hurricane" reached number one on the country radio airplay chart on May 15, 2017, holding that spot for two weeks.

In June 2017, he released his major label debut album, also titled This One's for You, on Columbia Nashville and River House Artists. It hit number one on Billboard's Top Country Albums and number five on the Billboard 200 in its first week. The album's second single, "When It Rains It Pours", was released to country radio on June 19, 2017. It reached number one on the Country Airplay chart in October 2017. The album's third single, "One Number Away", was released to country radio on January 8, 2018. In June 2018, he released a deluxe version titled This One's for You Too, with five bonus tracks, two of which ("She Got the Best of Me" and "Beautiful Crazy") were issued as singles with both reaching number-one. "Beautiful Crazy" reached number one on Country Airplay in February 2019, giving him five number-ones on the Billboard country chart with his first five singles. The song reached number one on three additional country charts – Hot Country Songs, Country Streaming Songs, and Country Digital Song Sales.

=== 2019–2021: What You See Is What You Get ===
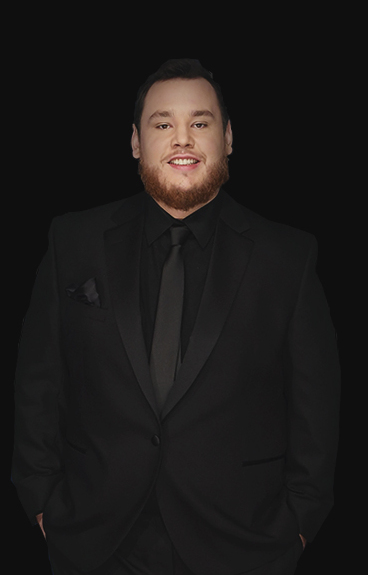
Combs in 2020

On June 11, 2019, he was invited to become a member of the Grand Ole Opry. In August 2019, This One's for You spent its 44th week at number one on Top Country Albums, setting the record for the longest reign at the top of that chart by a male artist. His second album, What You See Is What You Get, was released on November 8, 2019. The album has charted the singles "Beer Never Broke My Heart", "Even Though I'm Leaving", "Does to Me" (a duet with Eric Church), and "Lovin' on You", all of which have reached number one on the country chart.

In May 2020, he released the single "Six Feet Apart". The single quickly became popular to listeners as it illustrated the challenges of life during the COVID-19 pandemic. In June 2020 he confirmed his next single would be "Lovin' on You", which was released on both his second album and the EP The Prequel, which predated the album. He announced a deluxe version of What You See Is What You Get, titled What You See Ain't Always What You Get, with five new songs; it was released on October 23, 2020. The track "Forever After All" set streaming records in country music on Apple Music and Spotify.

=== 2022–2023: Growin' Up and Gettin' Old ===
Growin' Up, his third album, was released on June 24, 2022. The album has charted the singles "Doin' This"; "The Kind of Love We Make", which reached number one on the country chart and number eight on the Hot 100; and "Going, Going, Gone". In May 2023 Combs collaborated with English star Ed Sheeran on the single "Life Goes On". Following the release of the single, Sheeran's solo version of the song was released on his fifth studio album - (Subtract).

His fourth album, Gettin' Old, was released on March 24, 2023. A promotional single, "Growin' Up and Gettin' Old", and a single, "Love You Anyway", were released ahead of the album. His cover of Tracy Chapman's "Fast Car" was streamed more than 65 million times on Spotify in less than two months after the album was released, making it the most popular song from the album on that platform. Combs's version of "Fast Car" reached No. 2 on the Billboard Hot 100, higher than Chapman's original 1988 version, and No. 1 on the US Adult Top 40, US Country Airplay and US Hot Country Songs charts, as well as No. 1 on the Canada Country charts. The song garnered Combs the Single of the Year at the 57th Annual Country Music Association Awards on November 8, 2023. At the 66th Annual Grammy Awards on February 4, 2024, Combs performed a duet of the song with Chapman. He counts the song as his first favorite song and having an impact on him since he was a child.

=== 2024–present: Fathers & Sons and The Way I Am ===
In May 2024, Combs released "Ain't No Love in Oklahoma", the lead single from the Twisters soundtrack. Combs released "The Man He Sees in Me" on June 6, 2024, along with the announcement of his fifth studio album titled Fathers & Sons, which was released on June 14, 2024.

Combs and Eric Church put together the "Concert for Carolina" on October 26, 2024, at Bank of America Stadium in Charlotte, North Carolina, which raised over $24 million for Hurricane Helene relief.

The Way I Am, Combs's sixth studio album was released on March 20, 2026. The album earned Combs his fifth number one album on Billboard's Top Country Albums chart and entered the Billboard 200 chart at number two.

Combs made a guest appearance on the Disney Channel animated series Big City Greens, voicing country musician Rusty Twang.

== Personal life ==
Combs began dating Nicole Hocking in early 2016, and the couple became engaged in November 2018. They married in Florida on August 1, 2020. They have three sons.

Combs began to struggle with anxiety and primarily obsessional obsessive–compulsive disorder in adolescence through his college years; he has said that while it is something he has learned to control better, he still struggles with obsessive thoughts from time to time.

In 2023, Combs obtained a $250,000 SAD scheme default judgment against Nicol Harness, a fan who had sold $380 worth of tumblers featuring a likeness of Combs. Combs subsequently issued an apology and said he had no personal awareness of the lawsuit, sent Harness $11,000, and offered to sell the tumblers through his official merchandise store to assist with Harness's medical bills.

Luke co-owns a polarized sunglasses and hat company called Blue Otter Polarized.

== Discography ==
- This One's for You (2017)
- What You See Is What You Get (2019)
- Growin' Up (2022)
- Gettin' Old (2023)
- Fathers & Sons (2024)
- The Way I Am (2026)

== Tours ==
Headlining

- Don't Tempt Me with a Good Time Tour (2017–18)
- Beer Never Broke My Heart Tour (2019)
- What You See Is What You Get Tour (2020–21)
- Luke Combs World Tour (2023)
- Growin' Up and Gettin' Old Tour (2024)
- My Kinda Saturday Night Tour (2026–27)

Supporting

- The Devil Don't Sleep Tour (2017) with Brantley Gilbert
- High Noon Neon Tour (2018) with Jason Aldean
- Here on Earth Tour (2020) with Tim McGraw (two dates)

== Awards and nominations ==
Year	Awards	Category	Recipient/Work	Result	Ref
2017	CMT Music Awards	Breakthrough Video of the Year	"Hurricane"	Nominated	
2017	Country Music Association Awards	New Artist of the Year	Luke Combs	Nominated	
2018	Academy of Country Music Awards	New Male Vocalist of the Year	Luke Combs	Nominated	
2018	iHeartRadio Music Awards	Country Song of the Year	"Hurricane"	Nominated	
2018	iHeartRadio Music Awards	New Country Artist of the Year	Luke Combs	Won	
2018	Billboard Music Awards	Top Country Artist	Luke Combs	Nominated	
2018	Billboard Music Awards	Top Country Album	This One's for You	Nominated	
2018	CMT Music Awards	Video of the Year	"When It Rains It Pours"	Nominated	
2018	Country Music Association Awards	New Artist of the Year	Luke Combs	Won	
2018	Country Music Association Awards	Male Vocalist of the Year	Luke Combs	Nominated	
2018	American Music Awards	Favorite Album - Country	This One's for You	Nominated	
2019	Grammy Awards	Best New Artist	Luke Combs	Nominated	
2019	Academy of Country Music Awards	New Male Artist of the Year	Luke Combs	Won	
2019	Academy of Country Music Awards	Male Artist of the Year	Luke Combs	Nominated	
2019	CMT Music Awards	CMT Performance of the Year	Luke Combs and Leon Bridges	Won	
2019	CMT Music Awards	Video of the Year	"She Got the Best of Me"	Nominated	
2019	iHeartRadio Music Awards	Country Artist of the Year	Luke Combs	Won	
2019	Billboard Music Awards	Top Country Artist	Luke Combs	Won	
2019	Billboard Music Awards	Top Country Male Artist	Luke Combs	Won	
2019	Billboard Music Awards	Top Country Album	This One's For You	Won	
2019	Billboard Music Awards	Top Country Song	"She Got the Best of Me"	Nominated	
2019	Country Music Association Awards	Male Vocalist of the Year	Luke Combs	Won	
2019	Country Music Association Awards	Song of the Year	"Beautiful Crazy"	Won	
2019	Country Music Association Awards	Musical Event of the Year	"Brand New Man" (w/ Brooks & Dunn)	Nominated	
2020	Grammy Awards	Best Country Duo/Group Performance	"Brand New Man" (w/ Brooks & Dunn)	Nominated	
2020	Academy of Country Music Awards	Entertainer of the Year	Luke Combs	Nominated	
2020	Academy of Country Music Awards	Male Artist of the Year	Luke Combs	Won	
2020	Academy of Country Music Awards	Album of the Year	What You See Is What You Get	Won	
2020	Country Music Association Awards	Entertainer of the Year	Luke Combs	Nominated	
2020	Country Music Association Awards	Male Vocalist of the Year	Luke Combs	Won	
2020	Country Music Association Awards	Album of the Year	What You See Is What You Get	Won	
2020	Country Music Association Awards	Single of the Year	"Beer Never Broke My Heart"	Nominated	
2020	Country Music Association Awards	Song of the Year	"Even Though I'm Leaving"	Nominated	
2020	Country Music Association Awards	Song of the Year	"I Hope You're Happy Now"	Nominated	
2020	Billboard Music Awards	Top Country Artist	Luke Combs	Won	
2020	Billboard Music Awards	Top Country Male	Luke Combs	Won	
2020	Billboard Music Awards	Top Country Album	What You See Is What You Get	Won	
2020	People's Choice Awards	The Country Artist of 2020	Luke Combs	Nominated	
2021	Nashville Songwriter Awards	Songwriter-Artist of the Year	Luke Combs	Won	
2021	ARIA Music Awards	ARIA Award for Best International Artist	Luke Combs - What You See Ain't Always What You Get	Nominated	
2021	Academy of Country Music Awards	Entertainer of the Year	Luke Combs	Nominated	
2021	Academy of Country Music Awards	Male Vocalist of the Year	Luke Combs	Nominated	
2021	Academy of Country Music Awards	Music Event of the Year	"Does to Me" (with Eric Church)	Nominated	
2021	Billboard Music Awards	Top Country Artist	Luke Combs	Nominated	
2021	Billboard Music Awards	Top Country Male Artist	Luke Combs	Nominated	
2021	Country Music Association Awards	Entertainer of the Year	Luke Combs	Won	
2021	Country Music Association Awards	Male Vocalist of the Year	Luke Combs	Nominated	
2021	Country Music Association Awards	Song of the Year	"Forever After All"	Nominated	
2022	Academy of Country Music Awards	Entertainer of the Year	Luke Combs	Nominated	
2022	Academy of Country Music Awards	Male Vocalist of the Year	Luke Combs	Nominated	
2022	Billboard Music Awards	Top Country Artist	Luke Combs	Nominated	
2022	Billboard Music Awards	Top Country Male Artist	Luke Combs	Nominated	
2022	Billboard Music Awards	Top Country Song	"Forever After All"	Nominated	
2022	Country Music Association Awards	Entertainer of the Year	Luke Combs	Won	
2022	Country Music Association Awards	Male Vocalist of the Year	Luke Combs	Nominated	
2022	Country Music Association Awards	Album of the Year	Growin' Up	Won	
2023	Grammy Awards	Best Country Album	Growin' Up	Nominated	
2023	ARIA Music Awards	Best International Artist	Luke Combs	Nominated	
2023	Broadcast Music, Inc.	Country Writer of the Year	Luke Combs	Won	
2023	People's Choice Country Awards	The People's Artist of 2023	Luke Combs	Nominated	
2023	People's Choice Country Awards	The Male Artist of 2023	Luke Combs	Nominated	
2023	People's Choice Country Awards	The Album of 2023	Gettin' Old	Nominated	
2023	People's Choice Country Awards	The Song of 2023	"Fast Car"	Nominated	
2023	People's Choice Country Awards	The Song of 2023	"Love You Anyway"	Nominated	
2023	People's Choice Country Awards	The Corssover Song of 2023	"Life Goes On"	Nominated	
2023	People's Choice Country Awards	The Concert Tour of 2023	Luke Combs World Tour	Nominated	
2023	People's Choice Country Awards	The Social Country Star of 2023	Luke Combs	Nominated	
2023	Country Music Association Awards	Single of the Year	"Fast Car"	Won	
2023	Country Music Association Awards	Entertainer of the Year	Luke Combs	Nominated	
2023	Country Music Association Awards	Male Vocalist of the Year	Luke Combs	Nominated	
2023	Country Music Association Awards	Album of the Year	Gettin' Old	Nominated	
2023	Billboard Music Awards	Top Artist	Luke Combs	Nominated	
2023	Billboard Music Awards	Top Male Artist	Luke Combs	Nominated	
2023	Billboard Music Awards	Top Billboard 200 Artist	Luke Combs	Nominated	
2023	Billboard Music Awards	Top Hot 100 Artist	Luke Combs	Nominated	
2023	Billboard Music Awards	Top Country Artist	Luke Combs	Nominated	
2023	Billboard Music Awards	Top Country Male Artist	Luke Combs	Nominated	
2023	Billboard Music Awards	Top Country Touring Artist	Luke Combs	Nominated	
2023	Billboard Music Awards	Top Country Album	Gettin' Old	Nominated	
2023	Billboard Music Awards	Top Country Album	Growin' Up	Nominated	
2023	Billboard Music Awards	Top Country Song	"Fast Car"	Nominated	
2024	Grammy Awards	Best Country Solo Performance	"Fast Car"	Nominated	
2024	People's Choice Awards	The Male Artist	Himself	Nominated	
2024	People's Choice Awards	The Male Country Artist	Himself	Nominated	
2024	People's Choice Awards	The Song	"Fast Car"	Nominated	
2024	People's Choice Awards	The Album	Gettin' Old	Nominated	
2024	People's Choice Awards	The Concert Tour	Luke Combs World Tour	Nominated	
2024	People's Choice Country Awards	The People's Artist of 2024	Luke Combs	Nominated	
2024	People's Choice Country Awards	The Social Country Star of 2024	Luke Combs	Nominated	
2024	People's Choice Country Awards	The Male Artist of 2024	Luke Combs	Won	
2024	People's Choice Country Awards	The Album of 2024	Fathers & Sons	Won	
2024	People's Choice Country Awards	The Male Song of 2024	"Ain't No Love in Oklahoma"	Won	
2024	People's Choice Country Awards	The Storyteller Song of 2024	"The Man He Sees in Me"	Nominated	
2024	People's Choice Country Awards	The Music Video of 2024	"Ain't No Love in Oklahoma"	Nominated	
2024	People's Choice Country Awards	The Concert Tour of 2024	Growin' Up and Gettin' Old Tour	Nominated	
2024	Country Music Association Awards	Entertainer of the Year	Luke Combs	Nominated	
2024	Country Music Association Awards	Male Vocalist of the Year	Luke Combs	Nominated	
2024	Country Music Association Awards	Album of the Year	Fathers & Sons	Nominated	
2024	Billboard Music Awards	Top Male Artist	Luke Combs	Nominated	
2024	Billboard Music Awards	Top Country Artist	Luke Combs	Nominated	
2024	Billboard Music Awards	Top Country Male Artist	Luke Combs	Nominated	
2024	Billboard Music Awards	Top Country Touring Artist	Luke Combs	Nominated	
2025	Grammy Awards	Best Song Written for Visual Media	"Ain't No Love in Oklahoma"	Nominated	
2025	Academy of Country Music Awards	Entertainer of the Year	Luke Combs	Nominated	
2025	Academy of Country Music Awards	Male Artist of the Year	Luke Combs	Nominated	
2025	Academy of Country Music Awards	Artist-Songwriter of the year	Luke Combs	Nominated	
2025	Country Music Association Awards	Entertainer of the Year	Luke Combs	Nominated	
2025	Country Music Association Awards	Male Vocalist of the Year	Luke Combs	Nominated	
2025	Country Music Association Awards	Single of the Year	"Ain't No Love in Oklahoma"	Nominated	
2026	Academy of Country Music Awards	Entertainer of the Year	Luke Combs	Nominated	
2026	Academy of Country Music Awards	Male Artist of the Year	Luke Combs	Nominated	
2026	Academy of Country Music Awards	Artist-Songwriter of the Year	Luke Combs	Nominated	
2026	American Music Awards	Best Male Country Artist	Luke Combs	Nominated	
