= Gettin' Old =

Studio album by Luke Combs
- Released: March 24, 2023
- Genre: Country
- Length: 65:51
- Labels: Columbia; River House
- Producers: Luke Combs; Chip Matthews; Jonathan Singleton

Luke Combs chronology
| Growin' Up (2022) | Gettin' Old (2023) | Fathers & Sons (2024) |

Singles from Gettin' Old
- 1. "Love You Anyway" Released: February 10, 2023; 2. "Fast Car" Released: April 18, 2023; 3. "Where the Wild Things Are" Released: October 16, 2023

Gettin' Old is the fourth studio album by American country music singer Luke Combs, released on March 24, 2023, through Columbia Records Nashville and River House Records. It followed less than a year after his third album Growin' Up (2022) — the albums were recorded together and are intended as companion albums. The album was preceded by the lead single "Love You Anyway". Combs embarked on a world tour the day after the album's release.

== Background ==
Combs recorded Growin' Up and Gettin' Old together, but decided to release them as two separate albums. The title of the first promotional single, "Growin' Up and Gettin' Old" combines the two, and the two cover artworks can also be placed side by side. Combs co-wrote 15 of the 18 tracks, and the album also includes a cover of Tracy Chapman's "Fast Car". Like its companion album, Combs co-produced with Chip Matthews and Jonathan Singleton. Combs stated that the album "is about the stage of life I'm in right now. One that I'm sure a lot of us are in, have been through, or will go through", as well as "coming of age", "loving where life is now but at the same time missing how it used to be" and "living in the moment but still wondering how much time you have left".

Combs revealed the track listing in early February 2023.

== Critical reception ==
Professional ratings
Review scores
| Source | Rating |
|---|---|
| AllMusic | 4.5/5 stars |
| American Songwriter | 4.5/5 stars |
| Country Central | 8.8/10 |
| Entertainment Focus | 5/5 stars |
| Holler | 7.5/10 |

The album received largely positive reviews.

== Track listing ==
Gettin' Old track listing
| No. | Title | Writer(s) | Length |
|---|---|---|---|
| 1. | "Growin' Up and Gettin' Old" | Luke Combs; Rob Snyder; Channing Wilson | 3:52 |
| 2. | "Hannah Ford Road" | Combs; Jamie Davis | 3:37 |
| 3. | "Back 40 Back" | Combs; Ray Fulcher; Jeff Hyde; Driver Williams | 3:05 |
| 4. | "You Found Yours" | Combs; Thomas Archer; Dan Isbell; James McNair | 3:11 |
| 5. | "The Beer, the Band, and the Barstool" | Combs; Reid Isbell; Rob Williford | 3:37 |
| 6. | "Still" | Combs; Davis; Fulcher; D. Isbell; Dustin Nunley | 3:23 |
| 7. | "See Me Now" | Combs; Kenton Bryant; Fulcher; McNair | 4:05 |
| 8. | "Joe" | Combs; Erik Dylan; James Slater | 3:38 |
| 9. | "A Song Was Born" | Combs; Casey Beathard; D. Isbell; R. Isbell | 3:09 |
| 10. | "My Song Will Never Die" | Eric Church; Travis Meadows; Jonathan Singleton | 4:06 |
| 11. | "Where the Wild Things Are" | Randy Montana; Dave Turnbull | 3:59 |
| 12. | "Love You Anyway" | Combs; Fulcher; D. Isbell | 3:49 |
| 13. | "Take You with Me" | Combs; McNair; Williford | 3:26 |
| 14. | "Fast Car" | Tracy Chapman | 4:25 |
| 15. | "Tattoo on a Sunburn" | Combs; Fulcher; Ben Hayslip; D. Isbell | 3:45 |
| 16. | "5 Leaf Clover" | Combs; Jessi Alexander; Chase McGill | 3:30 |
| 17. | "Fox in the Henhouse" | Combs; Davis; D. Isbell; Nunley | 3:54 |
| 18. | "The Part" | Combs; Bryant; Fulcher | 3:20 |
| Total length: | | | 65:51 |

== Personnel ==
Musicians

- Luke Combs – vocals
- Steve Mackey – bass guitar
- Charlie Worsham – acoustic guitar (tracks 1, 3, 6, 8, 9, 12, 18)
- Chip Matthews – background vocals (1–5, 7–17), electric guitar (1, 2, 4, 5, 7, 8, 12, 15–17), percussion (1, 3–18)
- Jonathan Singleton – background vocals (1–5, 7–17), electric guitar (1, 2, 7–9, 11, 12, 15, 18), acoustic guitar (16)
- Jerry Roe – drums (1, 2, 4–11, 13–18)
- Derek Wells – electric guitar (1, 2, 7, 11, 13–15, 17)
- Rob Mcnelley – electric guitar (1–6, 8–15, 17)
- Sol Philcox-Littlefield – electric guitar (1, 3–10, 12, 16, 18)
- Jim "Moose" Brown – keyboards (1, 2, 4, 7–18)
- Pat Buchanan – electric guitar (1)
- Bryan Sutton – acoustic guitar (2, 3, 5, 11, 13–15, 17)
- Greg Morrow – drums (3, 12)
- Billy Justineau – keyboards (3, 5, 6)
- Paul Franklin – pedal steel guitar (3, 5, 7, 14)
- Jon Conley – acoustic guitar (4, 7, 10, 16, 18)
- Rob Williford – background vocals (4, 6)
- Tyler King – background vocals (4, 6)
- Travis Toy – pedal steel guitar (4)
- Adam Shoenfeld – electric guitar (7, 16)
- Scott Damn Sanders – pedal steel guitar (8)
- Gary Morse – steel guitar (10)
- Larry Franklin – fiddle (12)
- Alicia Enstrom – fiddle (16)

Technical

- Chip Matthews – production, engineering, editing (all tracks); mixing (6, 8, 10–15, 18)
- Luke Combs – production
- Jonathan Singleton – production
- Benny Quinn – mastering
- Fernando Reyes – mixing (1, 4, 5, 7, 16)
- Michael H. Brauer – mixing (1, 4, 5, 7, 16)
- Jim Cooley – mixing (2, 17)
- Zach Kuhlman – mixing (3), engineering (11, 13), engineering assistance (1–9, 12, 14–18)
- Steve Blackmon – engineering (1, 3–9, 12, 14–16, 18)
- Scott Johnson – project coordination
- Justin Francis – engineering assistance (10)

== Charts ==
=== Weekly charts ===
Weekly chart performance for Gettin' Old
| Chart (2023) | Peak position |
|---|---|
| Australian Albums (ARIA) | 2 |
| Australian Country Albums (ARIA) | 1 |
| Belgian Albums (Ultratop Flanders) | 156 |
| Canadian Albums (Billboard) | 2 |
| Dutch Albums (Album Top 100) | 97 |
| Irish Albums (Official Charts) | 6 |
| New Zealand Albums (RMNZ) | 2 |
| Norwegian Albums (VG-lista) | 6 |
| Scottish Albums (Official Charts) | 5 |
| Swedish Albums (Sverigetopplistan) | 33 |
| Swiss Albums (Schweizer Hitparade) | 64 |
| UK Albums (Official Charts) | 5 |
| UK Country Albums (Official Charts) | 1 |
| US Billboard 200 | 4 |
| US Top Country Albums (Billboard) | 2 |

=== Year-end charts ===
2023 year-end chart performance for Gettin' Old
| Chart (2023) | Position |
|---|---|
| Australian Albums (ARIA) | 17 |
| Canadian Albums (Billboard) | 11 |
| UK Albums (OCC) | 96 |
| US Billboard 200 | 20 |
| US Top Country Albums (Billboard) | 6 |

2024 year-end chart performance for Gettin' Old
| Chart (2024) | Position |
|---|---|
| Australian Albums (ARIA) | 55 |
| Australian Country Albums (ARIA) | 8 |
| Canadian Albums (Billboard) | 20 |
| New Zealand Albums (RMNZ) | 49 |
| US Billboard 200 | 31 |
| US Top Country Albums (Billboard) | 7 |

2025 year-end chart performance for Gettin' Old
| Chart (2025) | Position |
|---|---|
| Australian Albums (ARIA) | 83 |
| US Billboard 200 | 98 |
| US Top Country Albums (Billboard) | 18 |

== Certifications ==
Certifications for Gettin' Old
| Region | Certification | Certified units/sales |
|---|---|---|
| Australia (ARIA) | Platinum | 70,000^{‡} |
| Canada (Music Canada) | 2× Platinum | 160,000^{‡} |
| Denmark (IFPI Danmark) | Gold | 10,000^{‡} |
| New Zealand (RMNZ) | Gold | 7,500^{‡} |
| United Kingdom (BPI) | Gold | 100,000^{‡} |
| United States (RIAA) | 2× Platinum | 2,000,000^{‡} |
^{‡} Sales+streaming figures based on certification alone.
