= List of highest-certified digital singles in the United States =

This is a list compiling the highest certified digital singles in the United States, all of which have reached Diamond status and are kept track of by the Recording Industry Association of America. RIAA Certifications depend on how many units a single has received. A single being streamed 150 times equals one unit.

Digital singles are certified:

- 500,000 units = Gold status
- 1,000,000 units = Platinum status
- 2,000,000+ units = Multi-Platinum status
- 10,000,000 units = Diamond status
- 20,000,000+ units = Multi-Diamond status

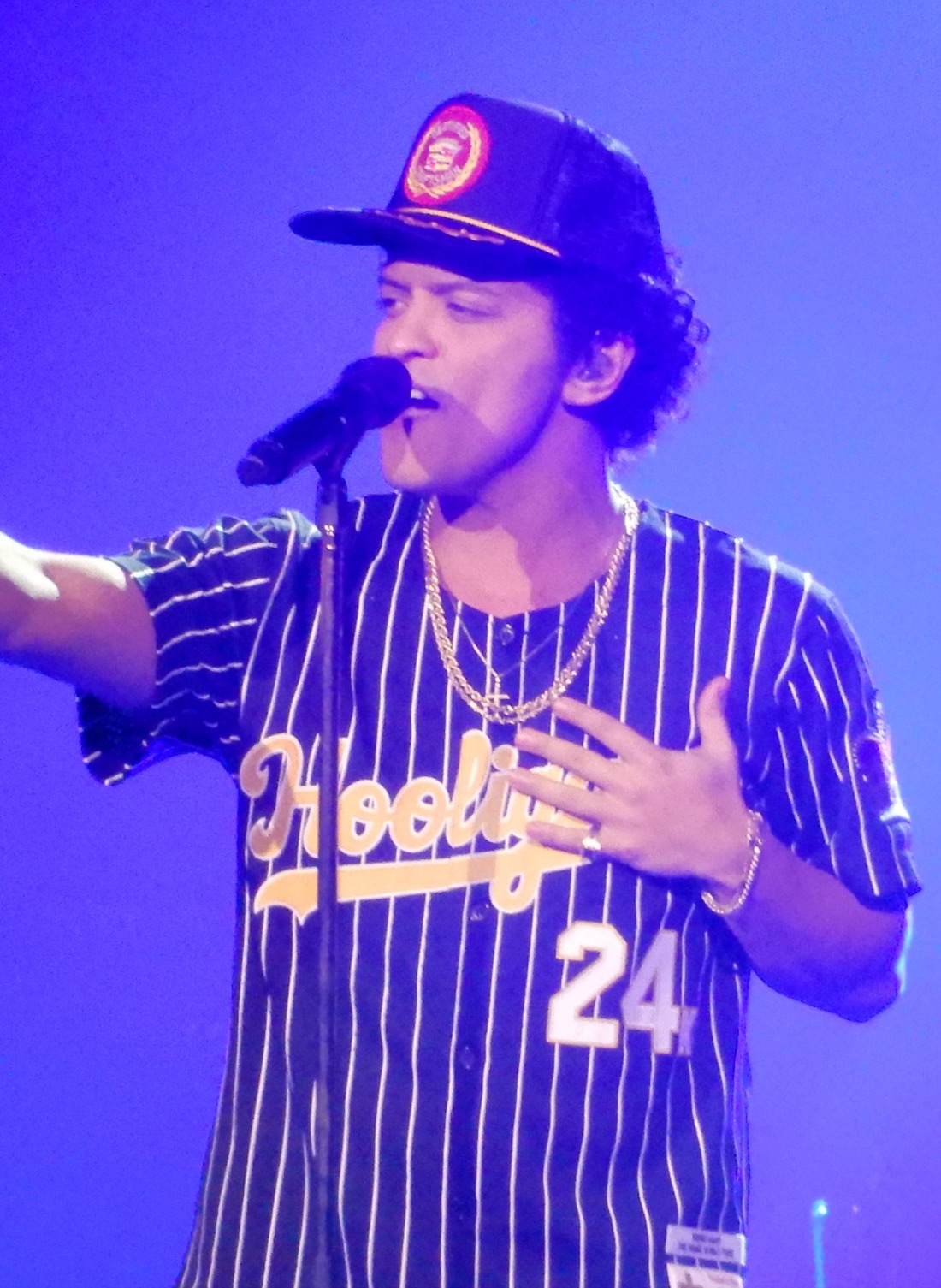
"Just the Way You Are" by Bruno Mars is the highest certified digital single of all time, having reached 21x Platinum status.

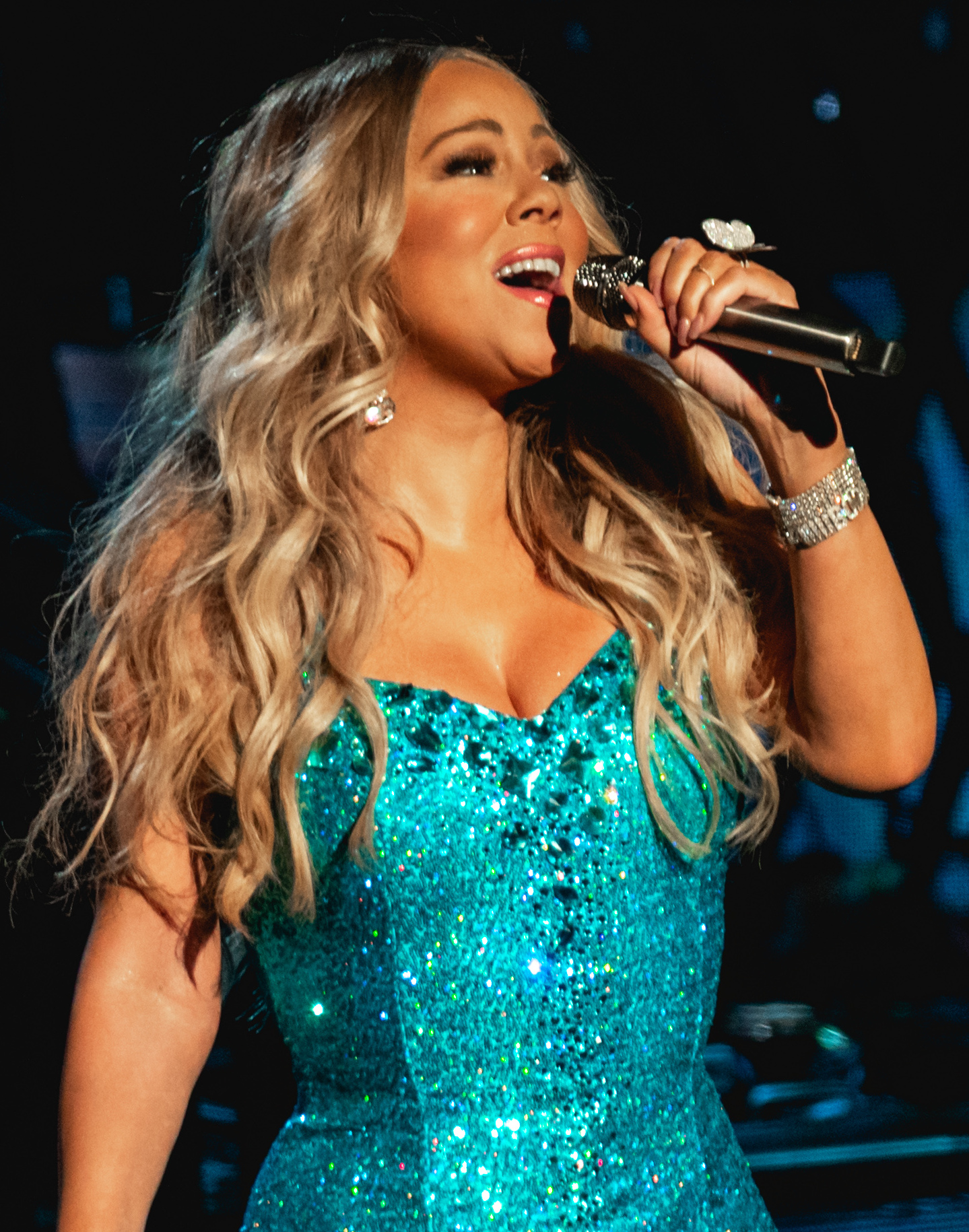
Mariah Carey's "All I Want for Christmas Is You" is the highest certified Christmas digital single, with 18× Platinum status.

Song	Artist(s)	Release Year	No. of times Platinum
"Just the Way You Are"	Bruno Mars	2010	21×
"Tennessee Whiskey"	Chris Stapleton	2015	20×
"God's Plan"	Drake	2018	20×
"Sunflower"	Post Malone and Swae Lee	2018	20×
"Thinking Out Loud"	Ed Sheeran	2014	18×
"Don't Stop Believin'"	Journey	1981	18×
"All I Want for Christmas Is You"	Mariah Carey	1994	18×
"Counting Stars"	OneRepublic	2013	18×
"Closer"	The Chainsmokers featuring Halsey	2016	18×
"Somebody That I Used to Know"	Gotye featuring Kimbra	2011	17×
"Radioactive"	Imagine Dragons	2012	17×
"Old Town Road"	Lil Nas X featuring Billy Ray Cyrus	2018	17×
"Party in the U.S.A."	Miley Cyrus	2009	17×
"Goosebumps"	Travis Scott featuring Kendrick Lamar	2016	17×
"Grenade"	Bruno Mars	2010	16×
"Sweater Weather"	The Neighbourhood	2012	16×
"Sicko Mode"	Travis Scott featuring Drake	2018	16×
"See You Again"	Wiz Khalifa featuring Charlie Puth	2015	16×
"Something in the Orange"	Zach Bryan	2022	16×
"Don't"	Bryson Tiller	2016	15×
"One Dance"	Drake featuring Wizkid and Kyla	2016	15×
"Life Is Good"	Future featuring Drake	2020	15×
"Take Me to Church"	Hozier	2013	15×
"I Gotta Feeling"	The Black Eyed Peas	2009	15×
"Roar"	Katy Perry	2013	15×
"Royals"	Lorde	2013	15×
"Beautiful Crazy"	Luke Combs	2018	15×
"Starboy"	The Weeknd featuring Daft Punk	2016	15×
"Cruise"	Florida Georgia Line	2012	14×
"Pumped Up Kicks"	Foster The People	2010	14×
"Mask Off"	Future	2017	14×
"Without Me"	Halsey	2018	14×
"Believer"	Imagine Dragons	2017	14×
"No Role Modelz"	J. Cole	2014	14×
"All of Me"	John Legend	2013	14×
"Stronger"	Kanye West	2007	14×
"Heartless"	Kanye West	2008	14×
"XO Tour Llif3"	Lil Uzi Vert	2017	14×
"Congratulations"	Post Malone featuring Quavo	2017	14×
"Shut Up and Dance"	Walk the Moon	2014	14x
"Exchange"	Bryson Tiller	2015	13×
"Bodak Yellow"	Cardi B	2017	13×
"A Thousand Years"	Christina Perri	2011	13×
"Shape Of You"	Ed Sheeran	2017	13×
"Perfect"	Ed Sheeran	2017	13×
"Lose Yourself"	Eminem	2002	13×
"Love the Way You Lie"	Eminem featuring Rihanna	2010	13×
"Low Life"	Future featuring The Weeknd	2016	13×
"Thunder"	Imagine Dragons	2017	13×
"I'm Yours"	Jason Mraz	2008	13×
"Gold Digger"	Kanye West featuring Jamie Foxx	2005	13×
"Despacito"	Luis Fonsi and Daddy Yankee featuring Justin Bieber	2017	13×
"When It Rains It Pours"	Luke Combs	2017	13×
"Whiskey Glasses"	Morgan Wallen	2018	13×
"Something Just Like This"	The Chainsmokers and Coldplay	2017	13×
"Hey, Soul Sister"	Train	2009	13×
"Stressed Out"	Twenty One Pilots	2015	13×
"Yeah!"	Usher featuring Lil Jon and Ludacris	2004	13×
"Demons"	Imagine Dragons	2013	12×
"Dirt Road Anthem"	Jason Aldean	2011	12×
"N****s in Paris"	Jay-Z and Kanye West	2011	12×
"Baby"	Justin Bieber featuring Ludacris	2010	12×
"Firework"	Katy Perry	2010	12×
"Tik Tok"	Kesha	2009	12×
"Pursuit of Happiness (Nightmare)"	Kid Cudi	2009	12×
"Need You Now"	Lady Antebellum	2009	12×
"7 Years"	Lukas Graham	2015	12×
"Hurricane"	Luke Combs	2016	12×
"Wasted On You"	Morgan Wallen	2022	12×
"Last Night"	Morgan Wallen	2023	12×
"Rockstar"	Nickelback	2006	12×
"Super Bass"	Nicki Minaj	2011	12×
"Timber"	Pitbull featuring Kesha	2013	12×
"Stay"	Rihanna featuring Mikky Ekko	2012	12×
"Needed Me"	Rihanna	2016	12×
"A Bar Song (Tipsy)"	Shaboozey	2024	12×
"Don't Let Me Down"	The Chainsmokers featuring Daya	2016	12×
"Wake Me Up"	Avicii	2013	11×
"Meant to Be"	Bebe Rexha featuring Florida Georgia Line	2017	11×
"Halo"	Beyoncé	2008	11×
"Single Ladies (Put a Ring on It)"	Beyoncé	2008	11×
"When I Was Your Man"	Bruno Mars	2013	11×
"I Like It"	Cardi B, Bad Bunny, and J Balvin	2018	11×
"Before He Cheats"	Carrie Underwood	2006	11×
"No Guidance"	Chris Brown featuring Drake	2019	11×
"Wagon Wheel"	Darius Rucker	2013	11×
"Not Afraid"	Eminem	2010	11×
"Unforgettable"	French Montana featuring Swae Lee	2017	11×
"Wait For U"	Future featuring Drake and Tems	2022	11×
"Let It Go"	Idina Menzel	2014	11×
"Lucid Dreams"	Juice Wrld	2018	11×
"Sorry"	Justin Bieber	2015	11×
"Heaven"	Kane Brown	2017	11×
"Dark Horse"	Katy Perry featuring Juicy J	2013	11×
"Bad Romance"	Lady Gaga	2009	11×
"Just Dance"	Lady Gaga	2008	11×
"The Night We Met"	Lord Huron	2017	11×
"Uptown Funk"	Mark Ronson featuring Bruno Mars	2014	11×
"Sugar"	Maroon 5	2015	11×
"Happy"	Pharrell Williams	2013	11×
"Baby Shark"	Pinkfong	2016	11×
"We Found Love"	Rihanna featuring Calvin Harris	2011	11×
"Work"	Rihanna featuring Drake	2016	11×
"Give Me Everything"	Pitbull featuring Ne-Yo, Afrojack, and Nayer	2011	11×
"Body Like a Back Road"	Sam Hunt	2017	11×
"Stitches"	Shawn Mendes	2015	11×
"Cheap Thrills"	Sia featuring Sean Paul	2016	11×
"Snooze"	SZA	2023	11×
"How to Save a Life"	The Fray	2005	11×
"Stay"	The Kid Laroi and Justin Bieber	2021	11×
"The Hills"	The Weeknd	2015	11×
"Lose Control"	Teddy Swims	2023	11×
"Heathens"	Twenty One Pilots	2016	11×
"I Will Always Love You"	Whitney Houston	1992	11×
"F*ck Love"	XXXTentacion featuring Trippie Redd	2018	11×
"I Remember Everything"	Zach Bryan featuring Kacey Musgraves	2023	11×
"Bring Me to Life"	Evanescence	2003	11×
"In Da Club"	50 Cent	2003	10×
"Drowning"	A Boogie wit da Hoodie featuring Kodak Black	2017	10×
"Say Something"	A Great Big World and Christina Aguilera	2013	10×
"Thunderstruck"	AC/DC	1990	10×
"Smack That"	Akon	2006	10×
"No One"	Alicia Keys	2007	10×
"7 Rings"	Ariana Grande	2019	10×
"Sail"	Awolnation	2010	10×
"Beautiful Things"	Benson Boone	2024	10×
"Bad Guy"	Billie Eilish	2019	10×
"Lovely"	Billie Eilish and Khalid	2018	10×
"Airplanes"	B.o.B featuring Hayley Williams	2010	10×
"Livin' On a Prayer"	Bon Jovi	1986	10×
"I Don't F**k with You"	Big Sean featuring E-40	2014	10×
"In Case You Didn't Know"	Brett Young	2017	10×
"That's What I Like"	Bruno Mars	2017	10×
"Locked Out Of Heaven"	Bruno Mars	2012	10×
"The Lazy Song"	Bruno Mars	2011	10×
"Havana"	Camila Cabello featuring Young Thug	2017	10×
"WAP"	Cardi B featuring Megan Thee Stallion	2020	10x
"Call Me Maybe"	Carly Rae Jepsen	2011	10×
"Look at Me Now"	Chris Brown featuring Lil Wayne and Busta Rhymes	2011	10×
"Tequila"	Dan + Shay	2018	10×
"Heartless"	Diplo featuring Morgan Wallen	2019	10×
"I'm the One"	DJ Khaled featuring Justin Bieber, Quavo, Chance the Rapper, and Lil Wayne	2017	10×
"Best I Ever Had"	Drake	2009	10×
"Nice For What"	Drake	2018	10×
"The Motto"	Drake featuring Lil Wayne	2011	10×
"Headlines"	Drake	2011	10×
"Passionfruit"	Drake	2017	10×
"Nonstop"	Drake	2018	10×
"Hold On, We're Going Home"	Drake featuring Majid Jordan	2013	10×
"Hotline Bling"	Drake	2015	10×
"Marvins Room"	Drake	2011	10×
"In My Feelings"	Drake	2018	10×
"Broccoli"	DRAM featuring Lil Yachty	2016	10×
"Levitating"	Dua Lipa	2020	10×
"Centuries"	Fall Out Boy	2014	10×
"Sugar, We're Goin Down"	Fall Out Boy	2005	10×
"Trap Queen"	Fetty Wap	2014	10×
"Low"	Flo Rida featuring T-Pain	2007	10×
"We Are Young"	Fun featuring Janelle Monáe	2011	10×
"Iris"	Goo Goo Dolls	1998	10×
"Heat Waves"	Glass Animals	2020	10×
"Bad at Love"	Halsey	2018	10×
"Middle Child"	J. Cole	2019	10×
"You Make It Easy"	Jason Aldean	2018	10×
"Whats Poppin"	Jack Harlow	2020	10×
"Say You Won't Let Go"	James Arthur	2016	10×
"Down"	Jay Sean featuring Lil Wayne	2009	10x
"Empire State of Mind"	Jay-Z featuring Alicia Keys	2009	10×
"Bang Bang"	Jessie J, Ariana Grande, and Nicki Minaj	2014	10×
"SexyBack"	Justin Timberlake	2006	10×
"What Ifs"	Kane Brown featuring Lauren Alaina	2017	10×
"Teenage Dream"	Katy Perry	2010	10×
"California Gurls"	Katy Perry featuring Snoop Dogg	2010	10×
"E.T."	Katy Perry	2011	10×
"Location"	Khalid	2016	10×
"Young Dumb & Broke"	Khalid	2017	10×
"Day 'N' Nite"	Kid Cudi	2008	10×
"iSpy"	Kyle featuring Lil Yachty	2016	10×
"Poker Face"	Lady Gaga	2008	10×
"Someone You Loved"	Lewis Capaldi	2018	10×
"Drip Too Hard"	Lil Baby and Gunna	2018	10×
"Lollipop"	Lil Wayne featuring Static Major	2008	10×
"Love Me"	Lil Wayne featuring Drake and Future	2013	10×
"In The End"	Linkin Park	2001	10×
"Truth Hurts"	Lizzo	2017	10×
"Party Rock Anthem"	LMFAO	2011	10×
"Play It Again"	Luke Bryan	2013	10×
"Country Girl (Shake It for Me)"	Luke Bryan	2011	10×
"She Got the Best of Me"	Luke Combs	2019	10×
"Can't Hold Us"	Macklemore & Ryan Lewis featuring Ray Dalton	2011	10×
"Thrift Shop"	Macklemore & Ryan Lewis featuring Wanz	2012	10×
"Rude"	Magic!	2013	10×
"Lean On"	Major Lazer featuring DJ Snake and MØ	2015	10×
"Moves Like Jagger"	Maroon 5 featuring Christina Aguilera	2011	10×
"Girls Like You"	Maroon 5 featuring Cardi B	2018	10×
"Happier"	Marshmello featuring Bastille	2018	10×
"All About That Bass"	Meghan Trainor	2014	10×
"Billie Jean"	Michael Jackson	1983	10×
"Thriller"	Michael Jackson	1983	10×
"Chasin' You"	Morgan Wallen	2019	10×
"You Proof"	Morgan Wallen	2022	10x
"Starships"	Nicki Minaj	2012	10×
"Smells Like Teen Spirit"	Nirvana	1991	10×
"Hey Ya!"	Outkast	2003	10×
"Fireflies"	Owl City	2009	10×
"I Write Sins Not Tragedies"	Panic! at the Disco	2006	10×
"High Hopes"	Panic! at the Disco	2018	10×
"White Iverson"	Post Malone	2015	10×
"Rockstar"	Post Malone featuring 21 Savage	2017	10×
"I Fall Apart"	Post Malone	2017	10×
"Psycho"	Post Malone featuring Ty Dolla Sign	2018	10×
"Better Now"	Post Malone	2018	10×
"Wow"	Post Malone	2018	10×
"Circles"	Post Malone	2019	10×
"Bohemian Rhapsody"	Queen	1975	10×
"Fight Song"	Rachel Platten	2015	10×
"Black Beatles"	Rae Sremmurd featuring Gucci Mane	2016	10×
"Umbrella"	Rihanna featuring Jay-Z	2007	10×
"Love on the Brain"	Rihanna	2016	10×
"Diamonds"	Rihanna	2012	10×
"Blurred Lines"	Robin Thicke featuring T.I. and Pharrell Williams	2013	10×
"The Box"	Roddy Ricch	2019	10×
"Stay with Me"	Sam Smith	2014	10×
"Chandelier"	Sia	2014	10×
"Chop Suey!"	System of a Down	2001	10×
"Kill Bill"	SZA	2023	10×
"Good Days"	SZA	2020	10×
"Shake It Off"	Taylor Swift	2014	10×
"Gives You Hell"	The All-American Rejects	2008	10×
"If I Die Young"	The Band Perry	2010	10×
"Boom Boom Pow"	The Black Eyed Peas	2009	10×
"Mr. Brightside"	The Killers	2003	10×
"Can't Feel My Face"	The Weeknd	2015	10×
"Earned It"	The Weeknd	2014	10×
"Blinding Lights"	The Weeknd	2019	10×
"Die for You"	The Weeknd	2016	10×
"Save Your Tears"	The Weeknd	2020	10×
"Die a Happy Man"	Thomas Rhett	2015	10×
"Africa"	Toto	1982	10×
"Drops of Jupiter (Tell Me)"	Train	2001	10×
"Ride"	Twenty One Pilots	2016	10×
"Or Nah (Remix)"	Ty Dolla $ign featuring Wiz Khalifa, DJ Mustard, and The Weeknd	2014	10×
"Taste"	Tyga featuring Offset	2018	10×
"Riptide"	Vance Joy	2013	10×
"No Hands"	Waka Flocka Flame featuring Roscoe Dash and Wale	2010	10×
"Black and Yellow"	Wiz Khalifa	2010	10×
"Sad!"	XXXTentacion	2018	10×

== Entries by artist ==
The following artists have achieved two or more songs certified Diamond or higher as lead or featured artist.

Entries	Artist	Songs
18	Drake	"Best I Ever Had", "God's Plan", "Headlines", "Hold On, We're Going Home", "Hotline Bling", "In My Feelings", "Life Is Good", "Love Me", "Marvins Room", "Nice For What", "No Guidance", "Nonstop", "One Dance", "Passionfruit", "Sicko Mode", "The Motto", "Wait For U", "Work"
9	Post Malone	"Better Now", "Circles", "Congratulations", "I Fall Apart", "Psycho", "Rockstar", "Sunflower", "White Iverson", "Wow"
9	The Weeknd	"Blinding Lights", "Can't Feel My Face", "Die For You", "Earned It", "Low Life", " Or Nah (Remix)", "Save Your Tears", "Starboy", "The Hills"
8	Rihanna	"Diamonds", "Love on the Brain", "Love the Way You Lie", "Needed Me", "Stay", "Umbrella", "We Found Love", "Work"
7	Bruno Mars	"Grenade", "Just the Way You Are", "Locked Out of Heaven", "That's What I Like", "The Lazy Song", "Uptown Funk", "When I Was Your Man"
6	Katy Perry	"California Gurls", "Dark Horse", "E.T.", "Firework", "Roar", "Teenage Dream"
6	Lil Wayne	"Down", "I'm The One", "Lollipop", "Look at Me Now", "Love Me", "The Motto"
6	Morgan Wallen	"Chasin' You", "Heartless", "Last Night", "Wasted on You", "Whiskey Glasses", "You Proof"
5	Future	"Life Is Good", "Love Me", Low Life", Mask Off", "Wait For U"
5	Justin Bieber	"Baby", "Despacito", "I'm The One", "Sorry", "Stay"
4	Imagine Dragons	"Believer", "Demons", "Radioactive", "Thunder"
4	Kanye West	"Gold Digger", "Heartless", "N****s in Paris", "Stronger"
4	Luke Combs	"Beautiful Crazy", "Hurricane", "When It Rains It Pours", "She Got the Best of Me"
4	Cardi B	"Bodak Yellow", "Girls Like You", "I Like It", "WAP"
3	Ed Sheeran	"Perfect", "Shape of You", "Thinking Out Loud"
3	Eminem	"Lose Yourself", "Love the Way You Lie", "Not Afraid"
3	Halsey	"Bad at Love", "Closer", "Without Me"
3	Jay-Z	"Empire State of Mind", "N****s in Paris", "Umbrella"
3	Khalid	"Location", "Lovely", "Young Dumb & Broke"
3	Lady Gaga	"Bad Romance", "Just Dance", "Poker Face"
3	Maroon 5	"Girls Like You", "Moves Like Jagger", "Sugar"
3	Nicki Minaj	"Bang Bang", "Starships" "Super Bass"
3	SZA	"Good Days", "Snooze", "Kill Bill"
3	The Chainsmokers	"Closer", "Don't Let Me Down", "Something Just like This"
3	Twenty One Pilots	"Heathens", "Ride", "Stressed Out"
3	Wiz Khalifa	"Black and Yellow", "Or Nah (Remix)", "See You Again"
2	Alicia Keys	"Empire State of Mind", "No One"
2	Ariana Grande	"Bang Bang", "7 Rings"
2	Beyoncé	"Halo", "Single Ladies (Put a Ring on It)"
2	Billie Eilish	"Bad Guy", "Lovely"
2	Bryson Tiller	"Don't", "Exchange"
2	Chris Brown	"Look at Me Now", "No Guidance"
2	Christina Aguilera	"Moves Like Jagger", "Say Something"
2	Fall Out Boy	"Sugar, We're Goin Down", "Centuries"
2	Florida Georgia Line	"Cruise", "Meant to Be"
2	J. Cole	"Middle Child", "No Role Modelz"
2	Jason Aldean	"Dirt Road Anthem", "You Make It Easy"
2	Kane Brown	"Heaven", "What Ifs"
2	Kesha	"Tik Tok", "Timber"
2	Kid Cudi	"Day 'N' Nite", "Pursuit of Happiness"
2	Lil Yachty	"Broccoli", "ISpy"
2	Ludacris	"Baby", "Yeah!"
2	Luke Bryan	"Country Girl (Shake It for Me)", "Play It Again"
2	Macklemore & Ryan Lewis	"Can't Hold Us", "Thrift Shop"
2	Michael Jackson	"Billie Jean", "Thriller"
2	Panic! at the Disco	"High Hopes", "I Write Sins Not Tragedies"
2	Pharrell Williams	"Blurred Lines", "Happy"
2	Pitbull	"Give Me Everything", "Timber"
2	Sia	"Chandelier", "Cheap Thrills"
2	Swae Lee	"Sunflower", "Unforgettable"
2	The Black Eyed Peas	"Boom Boom Pow", "I Gotta Feeling"
2	Train	"Drops of Jupiter (Tell Me)", "Hey, Soul Sister"
2	Travis Scott	"Goosebumps", "Sicko Mode"
2	Ty Dolla Sign	"Or Nah (Remix)", "Psycho""
2	Quavo	"Congratulations", "I'm the One"
2	XXXTentacion	"F*ck Love", "Sad!"
