= List of Billboard number-one country songs of 2019 =

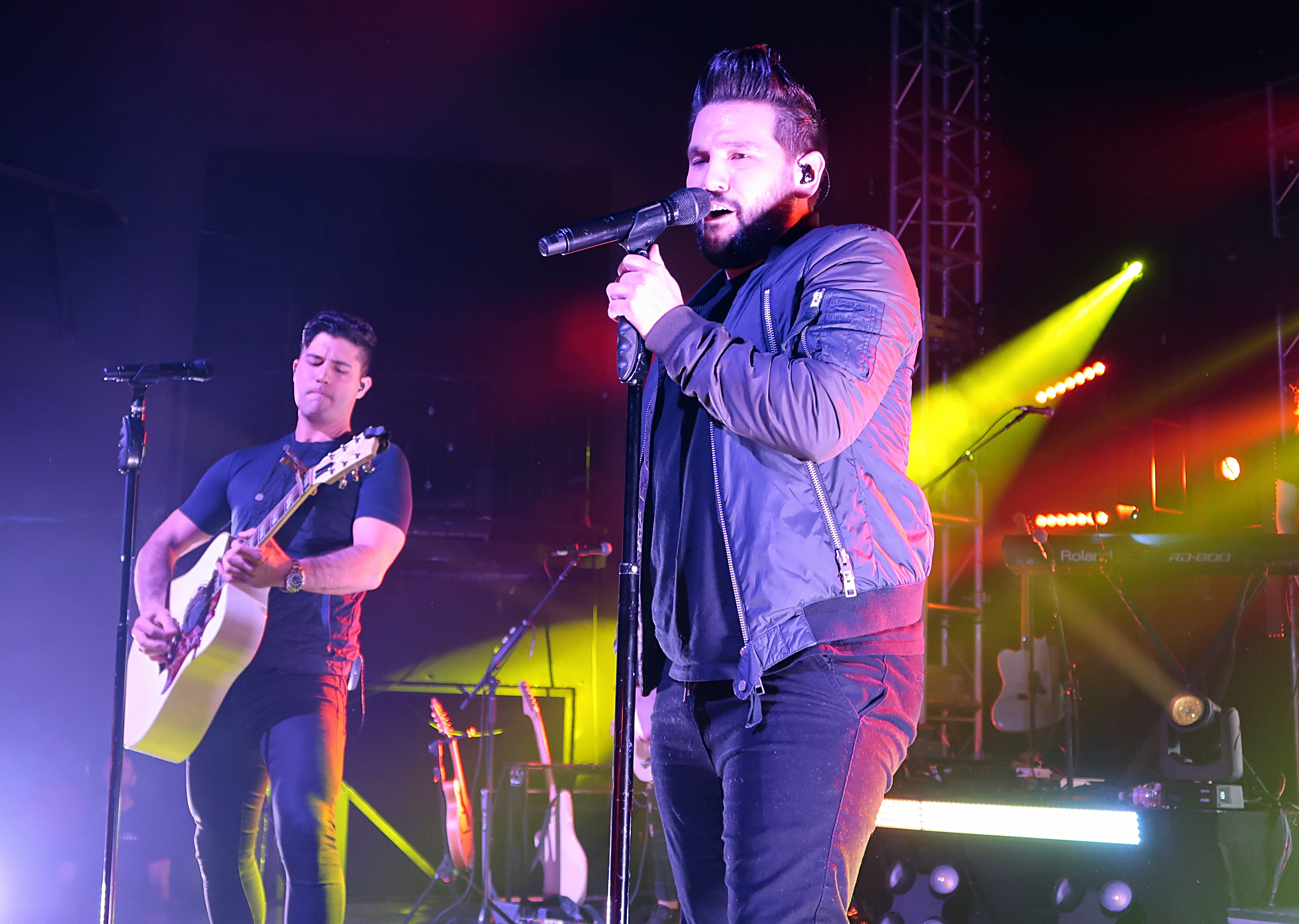
Dan + Shay began the year at number one on both Hot Country Songs and Country Airplay.

Hot Country Songs and Country Airplay are charts that rank the top-performing country music songs in the United States, published by Billboard magazine. Hot Country Songs ranks songs based on digital downloads, streaming, and airplay not only from country stations but from stations of all formats, a methodology introduced in 2012. Country Airplay, which was published for the first time in 2012, is based solely on country radio airplay, a methodology that had previously been used for several decades for Hot Country Songs. In 2019, 8 different songs topped the Hot Country Songs chart and 32 different songs topped Country Airplay in 52 issues of the magazine.

Both charts began the year with "Speechless" by Dan + Shay retaining the top spot from the final chart of 2018. The song remained atop the airplay chart for the first two weeks of 2019 before being replaced by "Good Girl" by Dustin Lynch, and held the top spot on Hot Country Songs for a further two weeks before Dan + Shay replaced themselves at number one with "Tequila". The latter song broke the record for the longest time taken to climb to number one on the Hot Country Songs chart, reaching the top spot in its 54th week on the listing. It reached the top of the chart more than six months after it had been number one on Country Airplay, and marked the first time for five years that an act had replaced itself at number one on Hot Country Songs. In early March, Luke Combs reached the top of both charts with "Beautiful Crazy" and topped both listings simultaneously for seven weeks. Industry observers reported that the track would have been replaced at number one on Hot Country Songs in early April by rapper Lil Nas X's song "Old Town Road" had Billboard not taken the decision to remove that track after its first week on the listing, contending that it did not sufficiently fit the country genre. This decision caused controversy: one former music label executive claimed that a similar track by a white artist would have been treated differently.

Three songs tied for the year's longest unbroken run atop the Hot Country Songs chart. "Beautiful Crazy" held the top spot for eleven consecutive weeks, a figure matched by both "The Git Up" by Blanco Brown and the year's final number one on the listing, "10,000 Hours", on which Dan + Shay collaborated with Canadian pop singer Justin Bieber. Dan + Shay thus spent a total of 19 weeks at number one in 2019, the most by any act. "The Git Up" spent twelve weeks in total at number one but non-consecutively, being interrupted for a single week by "God's Country" by Blake Shelton. The seven-week run at number one on Country Airplay achieved by "Beautiful Crazy" was the year's longest unbroken spell atop that listing and the longest-running country number one based on radio plays since Tim McGraw's "Live Like You Were Dying" in 2004. Combs achieved two further airplay chart-toppers with "Beer Never Broke My Heart" in August and "Even Though I'm Leaving" in November. When the former song reached number one, Combs achieved the feat of topping Billboard's radio-based country chart with his first six singles, something which no other act had achieved since the magazine began publishing a chart using that methodology in 1990. Combs tied with Thomas Rhett for the most number ones during the year, with three each. However, Rhett spent significantly less time at number one, topping the chart for three weeks compared to Combs' twelve. Dan + Shay, Jason Aldean, and Old Dominion were the only other acts to chart more than one number one song during 2019, with two each. In August, Maren Morris reached number one on the airplay chart with "Girl", the first chart-topper by a female vocalist for 17 months. The under-representation of female artists on the playlists of country radio stations had become a hot topic; an academic study published earlier in the year found that between 2000 and 2018 the proportion of airplay on country stations for songs by women fell from 33% to 11%.

== Chart history ==
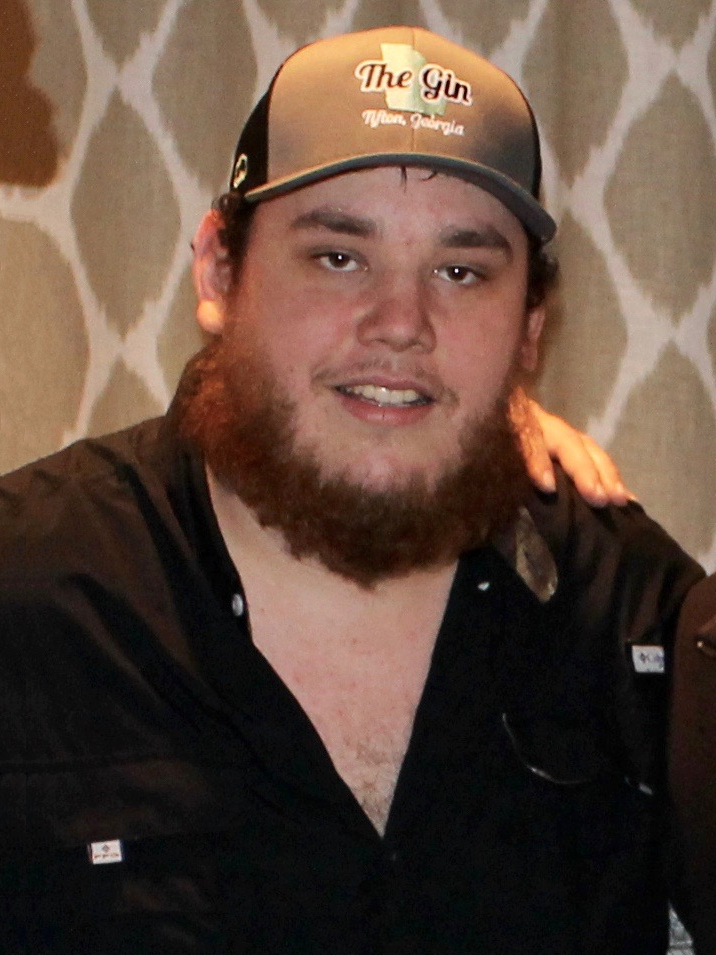
Luke Combs reached the top of both charts in early March with "Beautiful Crazy".

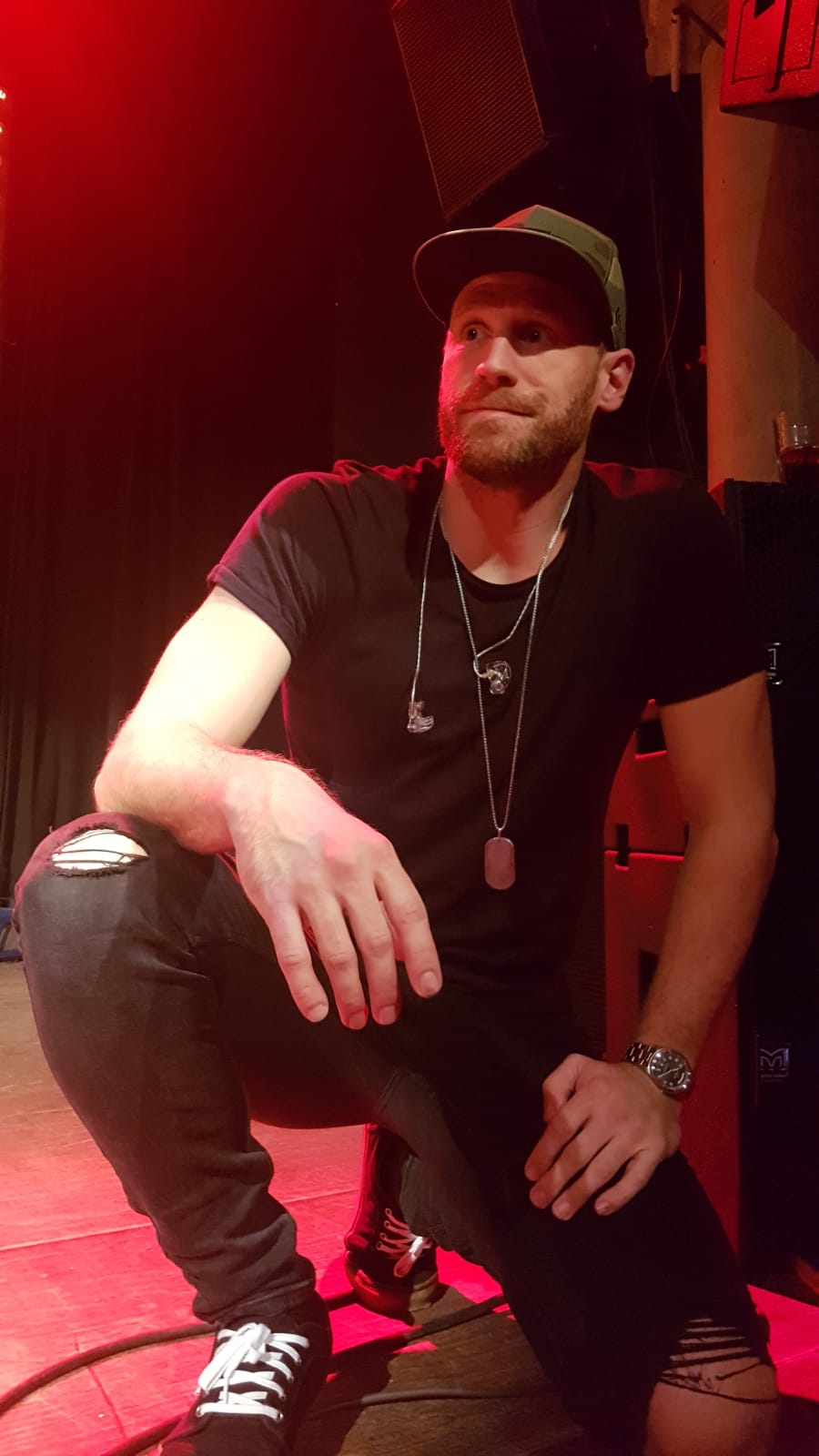
Chase Rice achieved his first number one with "Eyes on You".

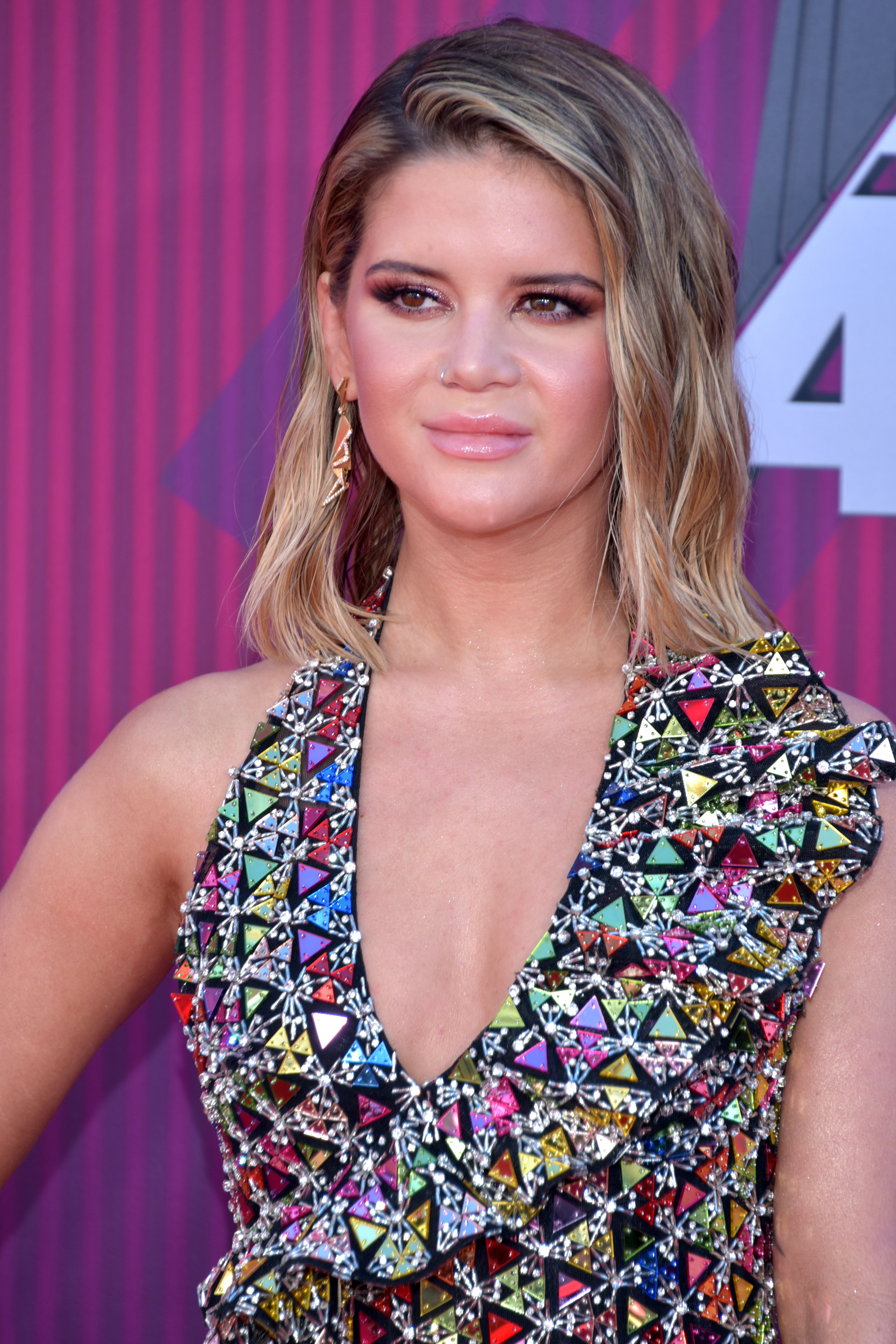
"Girl" was a chart-topper for Maren Morris.

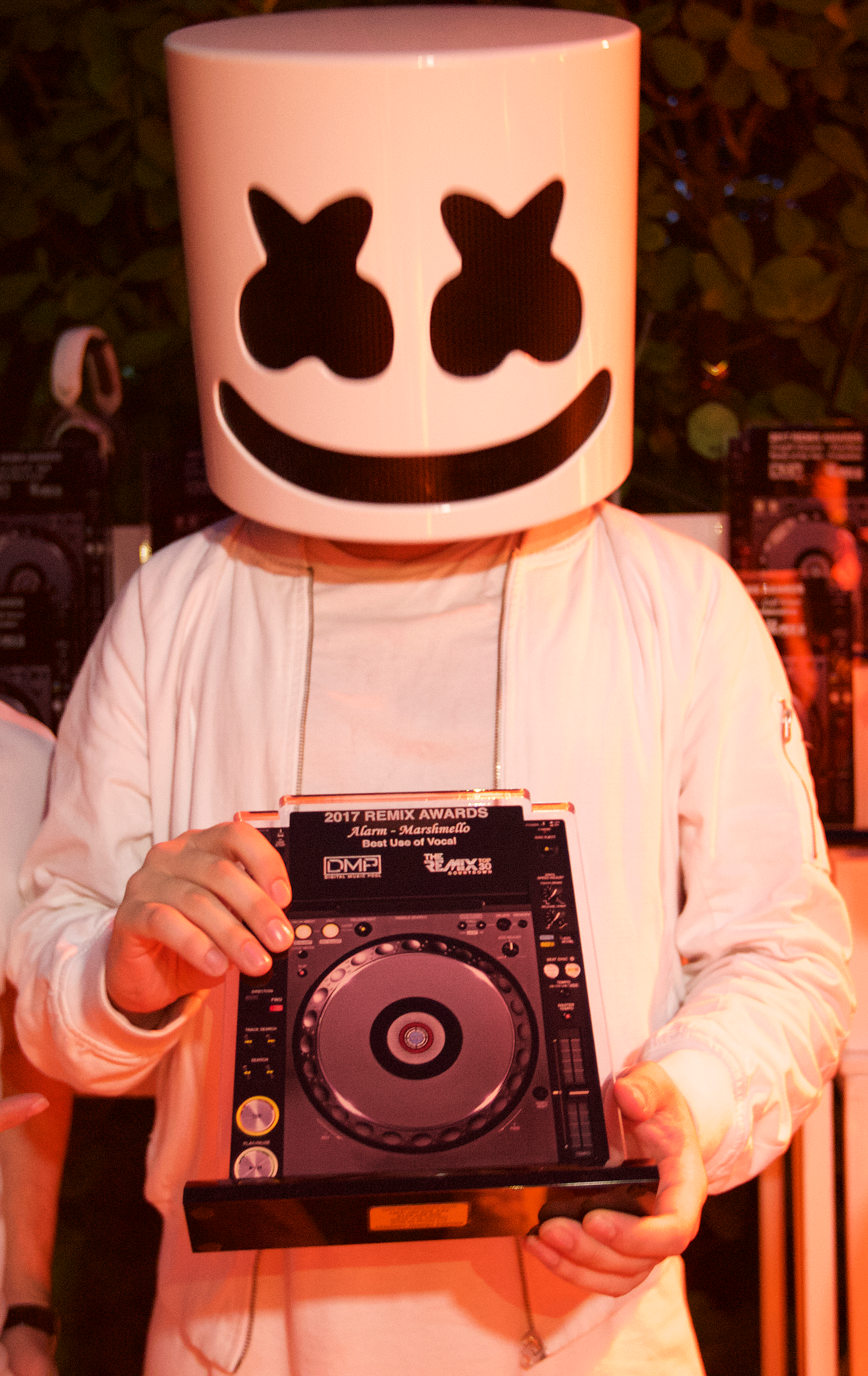
Electronic dance music producer Marshmello collaborated with singer Kane Brown on "One Thing Right", which topped Hot Country Songs for one week.

Chart history
Issue date	Hot Country Songs			Country Airplay		
Issue date	Title	Artist(s)	Ref.	Title	Artist(s)	Ref.
January 5	"Speechless"	Dan + Shay		"Speechless"	Dan + Shay	
January 12	"Speechless"	Dan + Shay		"Speechless"	Dan + Shay	
January 19	"Speechless"	Dan + Shay		"Good Girl"	Dustin Lynch	
January 26	"Speechless"	Dan + Shay		"Sixteen"	Thomas Rhett	
February 2	"Tequila"	Dan + Shay		"Girl Like You"	Jason Aldean	
February 9	"Tequila"	Dan + Shay		"Girl Like You"	Jason Aldean	
February 16	"Tequila"	Dan + Shay		"This Is It"	Scotty McCreery	
February 23	"Tequila"	Dan + Shay		"This Is It"	Scotty McCreery	
March 2	"Beautiful Crazy"	Luke Combs		"Beautiful Crazy"	Luke Combs	
March 9	"Beautiful Crazy"	Luke Combs		"Beautiful Crazy"	Luke Combs	
March 16	"Beautiful Crazy"	Luke Combs		"Beautiful Crazy"	Luke Combs	
March 23	"Beautiful Crazy"	Luke Combs		"Beautiful Crazy"	Luke Combs	
March 30	"Beautiful Crazy"	Luke Combs		"Beautiful Crazy"	Luke Combs	
April 6	"Beautiful Crazy"	Luke Combs		"Beautiful Crazy"	Luke Combs	
April 13	"Beautiful Crazy"	Luke Combs		"Beautiful Crazy"	Luke Combs	
April 20	"Beautiful Crazy"	Luke Combs		"Here Tonight"	Brett Young	
April 27	"Beautiful Crazy"	Luke Combs		"Here Tonight"	Brett Young	
May 4	"Beautiful Crazy"	Luke Combs		"Make It Sweet"	Old Dominion	
May 11	"Beautiful Crazy"	Luke Combs		"Eyes on You"	Chase Rice	
May 18	"Whiskey Glasses"	Morgan Wallen		"Eyes on You"	Chase Rice	
May 25	"God's Country"	Blake Shelton		"Love Ain't"	Eli Young Band	
June 1	"God's Country"	Blake Shelton		"Good as You"	Kane Brown	
June 8	"Whiskey Glasses"	Morgan Wallen		"Whiskey Glasses"	Morgan Wallen	
June 15	"God's Country"	Blake Shelton		"Whiskey Glasses"	Morgan Wallen	
June 22	"God's Country"	Blake Shelton		"Whiskey Glasses"	Morgan Wallen	
June 29	"God's Country"	Blake Shelton		"Look What God Gave Her"	Thomas Rhett	
July 6	"God's Country"	Blake Shelton		"Rumor"	Lee Brice	
July 13	"The Git Up"	Blanco Brown		"God's Country"	Blake Shelton	
July 20	"God's Country"	Blake Shelton		"God's Country"	Blake Shelton	
July 27	"The Git Up"	Blanco Brown		"Some of It"	Eric Church	
August 3	"The Git Up"	Blanco Brown		"Girl"	Maren Morris	
August 10	"The Git Up"	Blanco Brown		"Beer Never Broke My Heart"	Luke Combs	
August 17	"The Git Up"	Blanco Brown		"Beer Never Broke My Heart"	Luke Combs	
August 24	"The Git Up"	Blanco Brown		"All to Myself"	Dan + Shay	
August 31	"The Git Up"	Blanco Brown		"Rearview Town"	Jason Aldean	
September 7	"The Git Up"	Blanco Brown		"The Ones That Didn't Make It Back Home"	Justin Moore	
September 14	"The Git Up"	Blanco Brown		"Knockin' Boots"	Luke Bryan	
September 21	"The Git Up"	Blanco Brown		"Knockin' Boots"	Luke Bryan	
September 28	"The Git Up"	Blanco Brown		"Living"	Dierks Bentley	
October 5	"The Git Up"	Blanco Brown		"I Don't Know About You"	Chris Lane	
October 12	"One Thing Right"	Marshmello and Kane Brown		"Prayed for You"	Matt Stell	
October 19	"10,000 Hours"	Dan + Shay and Justin Bieber		"Prayed for You"	Matt Stell	
October 26	"10,000 Hours"	Dan + Shay and Justin Bieber		"Good Vibes"	Chris Janson	
November 2	"10,000 Hours"	Dan + Shay and Justin Bieber		"Love You Too Late"	Cole Swindell	
November 9	"10,000 Hours"	Dan + Shay and Justin Bieber		"Every Little Thing"	Russell Dickerson	
November 16	"10,000 Hours"	Dan + Shay and Justin Bieber		"What Happens in a Small Town"	Brantley Gilbert and Lindsay Ell	
November 23	"10,000 Hours"	Dan + Shay and Justin Bieber		"Even Though I'm Leaving"	Luke Combs	
November 30	"10,000 Hours"	Dan + Shay and Justin Bieber		"Even Though I'm Leaving"	Luke Combs	
December 7	"10,000 Hours"	Dan + Shay and Justin Bieber		"Even Though I'm Leaving"	Luke Combs	
December 14	"10,000 Hours"	Dan + Shay and Justin Bieber		"One Man Band"	Old Dominion	
December 21	"10,000 Hours"	Dan + Shay and Justin Bieber		"Remember You Young"	Thomas Rhett	
December 28	"10,000 Hours"	Dan + Shay and Justin Bieber		"Even Though I'm Leaving"	Luke Combs	

== See also ==
- 2019 in music
- List of artists who reached number one on the U.S. country chart
- List of Top Country Albums number ones of 2019
