= 54th Academy of Country Music Awards =

US music awards ceremony in 2019

- Date: April 7, 2019
- Location: MGM Grand Garden Arena, Las Vegas, Nevada
- Hosted by: Reba McEntire

Highlights
- Most wins: Dan + Shay; Kacey Musgraves; (2 each)
- Most nominations: Dan + Shay (5)

Television/radio coverage
- Network: CBS

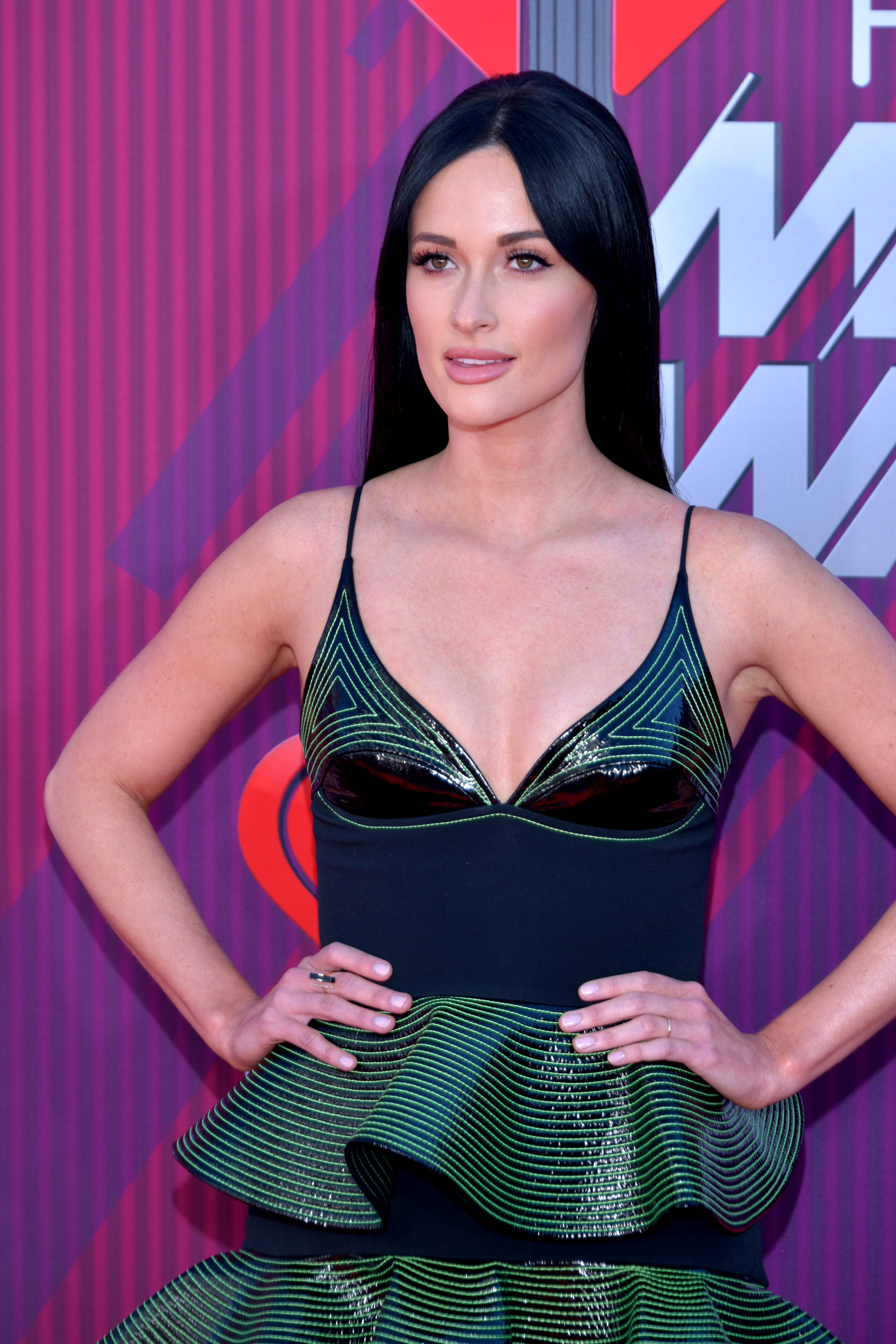
Kacey Musgraves, Album of the Year recipient for her critically acclaimed album Golden Hour.

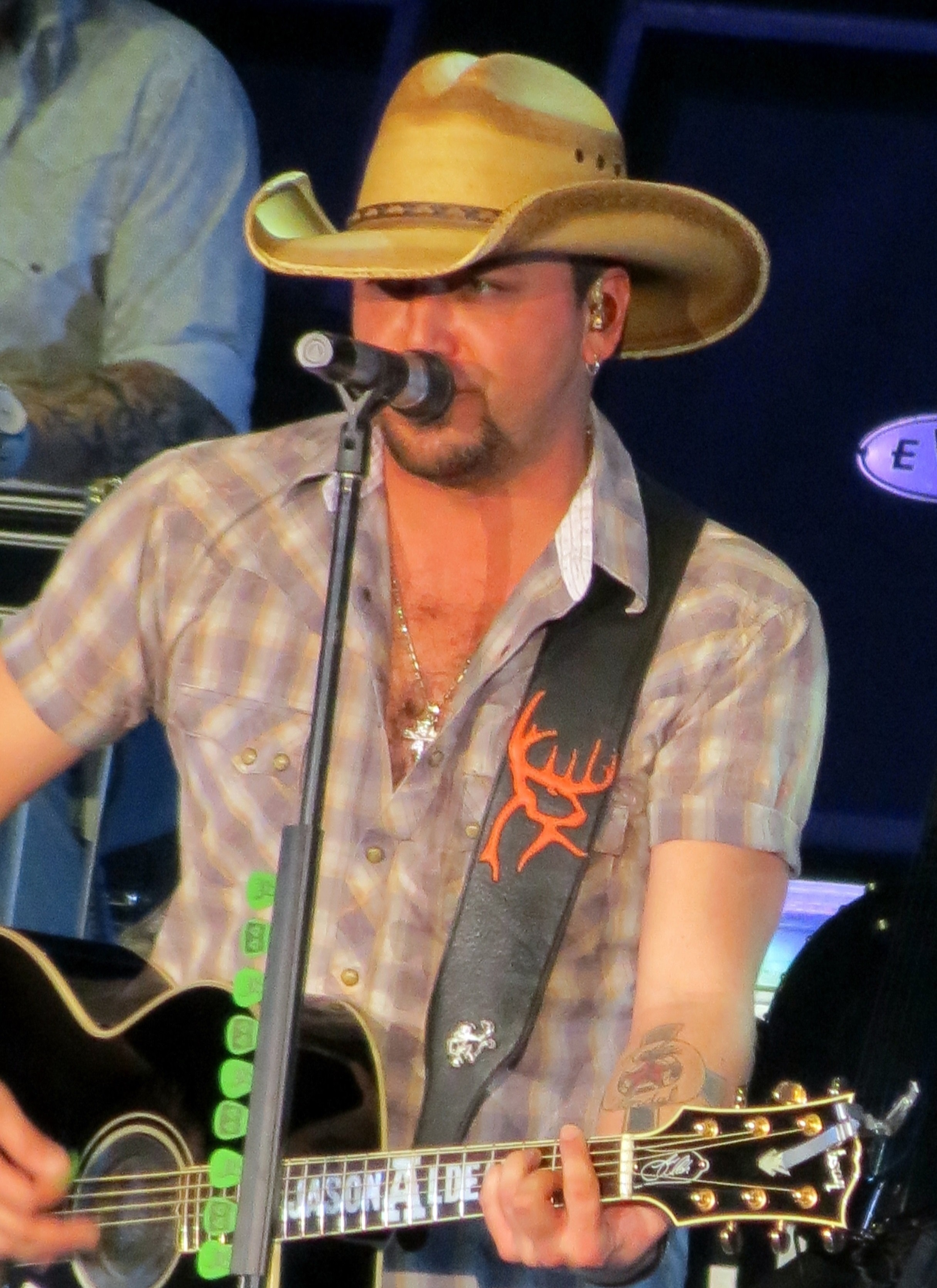
Jason Aldean, Artist of the Decade recipient.

The 54th Academy of Country Music Awards was held at the MGM Grand Garden Arena in Las Vegas, Nevada on April 7, 2019. Nominations were announced on February 20, 2019 by Reba McEntire during CBS This Morning, with Chris Stapleton and Dan + Shay leading with six nominations each. McEntire returned to host the awards for the sixteenth time.

Jason Aldean was presented with the ACM's rare honor "Artist of the Decade" by previous holder George Strait.

== Winners and Nominees ==
The winners are shown in bold.

Entertainer of the Year	Album of the Year
**Keith Urban**; Jason Aldean; Luke Bryan; Kenny Chesney; Chris Stapleton	**Golden Hour** — **Kacey Musgraves**; Dan + Shay — Dan + Shay; Desperate Man — Eric Church; From A Room: Volume 2 — Chris Stapleton; The Mountain — Dierks Bentley
Female Artist of the Year	Male Artist of the Year
**Kacey Musgraves**; Miranda Lambert; Ashley McBryde; Maren Morris; Carrie Underwood	**Thomas Rhett**; Dierks Bentley; Luke Combs; Chris Stapleton; Keith Urban
Group of the Year	Duo of the Year
**Old Dominion**; Lady Antebellum; LANCO; Little Big Town; Midland	**Dan + Shay**; Brothers Osborne; Florida Georgia Line; LoCash; Maddie & Tae
Single of the Year	Song of the Year
**"Tequila"** — **Dan + Shay**; "Down to the Honkytonk" — Jake Owen; "Heaven" — Kane Brown; "Meant to Be — Bebe Rexha and Florida Georgia Line; "Most People Are Good" — Luke Bryan	**"Tequila"** — **Nicolle Galyon, Jordan Reynolds, Dan Smyers**; "Break Up in the End" — Jessie Jo Dillon, Chase McGill, Jon Nite; "Broken Halos" — Mike Henderson, Chris Stapleton; "Meant to Be" — David Garcia, Tyler Hubbard, Joshua Miller, Bebe Rexha; "Space Cowboy" — Luke Laird, Shane McAnally, Kacey Musgraves; "Yours" — Casey Brown, Russell Dickerson, Parker Welling
New Female Artist of the Year	New Male Artist of the Year
**Ashley McBryde**; Danielle Bradbery; Lindsay Ell; Carly Pearce	**Luke Combs**; Jimmie Allen; Jordan Davis; Michael Ray; Mitchell Tenpenny
New Vocal Duo or Group of the Year	Video of the Year
**Lanco**; High Valley; Runaway June	**"Drunk Girl"** — **Chris Janson; Dir. Jeff Venable**; "Babe" — Sugarland (feat. Taylor Swift); Dir. Anthony Mandler; "Burn Out" — Midland; Dir. TK McKamy; "Burning Man" — Dierks Bentley (feat. Brothers Osborne); Dir. Wes Edwards; "Shoot Me Straight" — Brothers Osborne; Dir. Wes Edwards; "Tequila" — Dan + Shay; Dir. Patrick Tracy
Music Event of the Year	Songwriter of the Year
**"Burning Man"** — **Dierks Bentley and Brothers Osborne**; "Drowns the Whiskey" — Jason Aldean and Miranda Lambert; "Everything's Gonna Be Alright" — David Lee Murphy and Kenny Chesney; "Keeping Score" — Dan + Shay and Kelly Clarkson; Meant to Be" — Bebe Rexha and Florida Georgia Line	**Shane McAnally**; Ross Copperman; Ashley Gorley; Chas McGill; Josh Osborne
Artist of the Decade
**Jason Aldean**

== Performances ==
Performer(s)	Song(s)
Florida Georgia Line; Jason Aldean	"Can't Hide Red"
Thomas Rhett	"Look What God Gave Her"
Miranda Lambert	Medley of Hits "Kerosene" "Gunpowder and Lead" "Mama's Broken Heart" "White Liar" "Little Red Wagon"
Luke Bryan	"Knockin' Boots"
Chris Stapleton	"A Simple Song"
Ashley McBryde	"Girl Going Nowhere"
Maren Morris; Brothers Osborne	"All My Favorite People"
George Strait; Miranda Lambert	"Run"
Luke Combs; Amanda Shires (on fiddle)	"Beautiful Crazy"
Dan + Shay; Kelly Clarkson	"Keeping Score"
Little Big Town	"The Daughters"
Blake Shelton	"God's Country"
Old Dominion	"Make It Sweet"
Brooks & Dunn; Luke Combs	"Brand New Man"
Keith Urban; Charlie Worsham (on guitar)	"Burden"
Eric Church; Ashley McBryde	"The Snake"
Lanco	"Rival"
Carrie Underwood	"Southbound"
Kane Brown; Khalid	"Saturday Nights"
Reba McEntire	"Freedom"
Jason Aldean; Kelly Clarkson	Artist of the Decade Medley "Lights Come On" "Don't You Wanna Stay" "Dirt Road Anthem"
Chrissy Metz; Lauren Alaina; Maddie & Tae; Mickey Guyton; Carrie Underwood	"I'm Standing With You"
Dierks Bentley; Brandi Carlile	"Travelin' Light"
George Strait	"Every Little Honky Tonk Bar"

== Presenters ==
Presenters
Lauren Alaina
Beth Behrs
Clint Black
Nikolaj Coster-Waldau
Jessie James Decker
Hunter Hayes
Jay Hernandez
Lady Antebellum
Midland
Nancy O'Dell
Danica Patrick
Carly Pearce
Michael Ray
Cole Swindell
Wilmer Valderrama

== Reception ==
In its review of the event, Rolling Stone Country praised that the ACMs took the opportunity to bring seasoned musicians Amanda Shires and Charlie Worsham "into the fold" by having them appear alongside Luke Combs and Keith Urban respectively but criticised that the ACMs did not introduce either of them or even feature them on screen. Worsham, who the reviewer believed should have been nominated for his own awards, performed "mostly in the shadows" and Shires, who "helped transform [Combs' performance] with her lyrical playing" was barely seen. Rolling Stone also praised Reba McEntire's hosting and the performances by Dierks Bentley and Brandi Carlile, Little Big Town, Miranda Lambert and Ashley McBryde but stated that it was "baffling" that Kacey Musgraves, who had five nominations and won the CMA Award for Album of the Year and four Grammy Awards including Best Country Album and the all-genre Album of the Year for Golden Hour, did not perform. Musgraves' win made her only the third artist (after Taylor Swift and the artists that appeared on Oh Brother, Where Art Thou?) to win the ACM, CMA and Grammy Awards for Best Country Album as well as the all-genre Grammy for Album of the Year.

== See also ==
- Academy of Country Music Awards
