= One Number Away =

Single by Luke Combs

from the album This One's for You
- Released: January 8, 2018
- Genre: Country
- Length: 3:42
- Label: Columbia Nashville
- Songwriters: Luke Combs; Sammy Mitchell; Steven Battey; Robert Williford
- Producers: Sammy Mitchell; Steven Battey

Luke Combs singles chronology
"When It Rains It Pours" (2017)	"One Number Away" (2018)	"She Got the Best of Me" (2018)

"One Number Away" is a song co-written and recorded by American country music singer Luke Combs. He wrote it with Robert Williford, Sammy Mitchell, and Steven Battey. Sammy Mitchell produced the song, engineered/edited it, and performed many of the instruments. Steven Battey is listed with a co-production. It was released in January 2018 as the third single from his debut studio album This One's for You (2017). The song is a country ballad about a man conflicted with not wanting to breakdown and call his ex-girlfriend. "One Number Away" reached number one on the Billboard Country Airplay chart, giving Combs his third number-one country hit overall. It also peaked at numbers three and 34 on both the Hot Country Songs and Hot 100 charts respectively. The song was certified 6× Platinum by the Recording Industry Association of America (RIAA), and has sold 6,000,000 copies in the US as of January 2026. It achieved similar chart success in Canada, giving Combs his second number-one hit on the Canada Country chart and reaching number 87 on the Canadian Hot 100. It garnered a Platinum certification from Music Canada, denoting sales of 80,000 units in that country. An accompanying music video for the single was created by TA Films. For promotion, Combs performed the song live on Jimmy Kimmel Live!, Megyn Kelly Today and The Late Show with Stephen Colbert.

== Content ==
"One Number Away" is a country ballad about a man who is feeling conflict and "struggling not to break down and call his ex".

== Commercial performance ==
"One Number Away" peaked at number one on the Billboard Country Airplay chart dated June 9, 2018, giving Combs his third number-one hit on the chart. On the Billboard Hot 100, the song debuted at number 84 the week of March 31, 2018. Ten weeks later, it peaked at number 34 the week of June 8, and stayed on the chart for twenty weeks. The song was certified 6× Platinum by the Recording Industry Association of America (RIAA) in 2025. It has sold 316,000 copies in the United States as of January 2019.

In Canada, the single debuted at number 91 on the Canadian Hot 100 the week of April 7 and reached number 88 the next week. It peaked at number 87 the week of May 25, and stayed on the chart for seven weeks. It was certified platinum by Music Canada on December 14, 2018.

== Music video ==
The song's music video was created by TA Films. Rolling Stone described the video as "center[ing] on a broken-up couple who appear to be on the verge of reuniting, while an ominous cloud seems to hang over them both". Combs said that he wanted the song's video to be as "powerful" as the song itself.

== Live performances ==
On November 8, 2017 (recorded October 2), Combs performed the track along with "When It Rains Is Pours" on Jimmy Kimmel Live! after the 51st Annual Country Music Association Awards. On May 25, 2018, he performed it live on Megyn Kelly Today. On July 17, he performed it again on The Late Show with Stephen Colbert.

== Credits and personnel ==
Adapted from This One's for You liner notes.

- Luke Combs – lead vocals
- Tyler King – background vocals
- Sammy Mitchell – electric guitar, acoustic guitar, bass guitar, background vocals
- Kurt Ozan – pedal steel guitar
- Sol Philcox-Littlefield – electric guitar
- Grady Saxman – drums, percussion
- Grace Anne Waller – background vocals
- Rob Williford – acoustic guitar, background vocals

Technical

- Sammy Mitchell - Production
- Steven Battey - Co-Production

== Charts ==
=== Weekly charts ===
Chart (2018)	Peak position
Canada Hot 100 (Billboard)	87
Canada Country (Billboard)	1
US Billboard Hot 100	34
US Hot Country Songs (Billboard)	3
US Country Airplay (Billboard)	1

=== Year-end charts ===
Chart (2018)	Position
US Billboard Hot 100	96
US Country Airplay (Billboard)	3
US Hot Country Songs (Billboard)	6

== Certifications ==
Region	Certification	Certified units/sales
Australia (ARIA)	2× Platinum	140,000^{‡}
Canada (Music Canada)	Platinum	80,000^{‡}
New Zealand (RMNZ)	Platinum	30,000^{‡}
United Kingdom (BPI)	Silver	200,000^{‡}
United States (RIAA)	6× Platinum	6,000,000^{‡}
^{‡} Sales+streaming figures based on certification alone.
