= This One's for You (Luke Combs album) =

Studio album by Luke Combs
- Released: June 2, 2017
- Recorded: March 2016
- Genre: Country
- Length: 42:59
- Labels: River House Artists; Columbia Nashville
- Producers: Sammy Mitchell; Scott Moffatt

Luke Combs chronology
This One's for You (EP) (2015)	This One's for You (2017)	The Prequel (2019)

Singles from This One's for You
- 1. "Hurricane" Released: October 3, 2016; 2. "When It Rains It Pours" Released: June 19, 2017; 3. "One Number Away" Released: January 8, 2018; 4. "She Got the Best of Me" Released: July 9, 2018; 5. "Beautiful Crazy" Released: December 3, 2018

This One's for You is the debut studio album by American country music artist Luke Combs. It was released on June 2, 2017, through River House Artist and Columbia Nashville. It reached number one on the Top Country Albums chart for 50 weeks, and broke the record for a male artist at the time.

The album includes the singles "Hurricane", "When It Rains It Pours", and "One Number Away". A deluxe reissue titled This One's for You Too was released June 1, 2018, and featured five new tracks to commemorate the album's first anniversary. Two of these tracks, "She Got the Best of Me" and "Beautiful Crazy", were also issued as singles. The album reached the top ten in Canada, Australia and the United States.

== History ==
The album's lead single was "Hurricane", which reached No. 1 on Country Airplay. Combs co-wrote all twelve songs on the album. He told Nash Country Daily that he considered it "a good synopsis of who I am" and "I don't think there’s one track that sounds the same as another."

== Critical reception ==
Stephen Thomas Erlewine of AllMusic rated the album 3.5 out of 5 stars, praising the ballads and noting that "The tension between Combs' traditional side and modern inclinations is what gives This One's for You some freshness and it surfaces often." Chuck Dauphin of Sounds Like Nashville wrote that "vocals are one thing that Combs has in his favor. You get the feeling that no producer had to coach him to be country", while also praising Combs's songwriting.

== Commercial performance ==
This One's for You debuted at number five on the US Billboard 200 on its release in June 2017, selling 43,000 album-equivalent units of which 35,000 copies were pure album sales in its first week. It also debuted at number one on the US Top Country Albums chart. In its second week, the album dropped to number 33 selling an additional 8,700 units. In June 2018, the deluxe version of the LP was released, and it had its biggest sales week and returned to number one on Top Country Albums with 55,000 equivalent album units (23,000 in traditional album sales) consumed. In August 2019, it became the longest reigning album on the Top Country Albums in the chart history for a male artist at 46 weeks. By the chart dated November 2, 2019, the album had spent 50 weeks at No. 1 on Top Country Albums, equaling the record of Shania Twain's Come On Over.

On October 6, 2025, the album was certified eight-times platinum by the Recording Industry Association of America (RIAA) for combined sales and album-equivalent units of over eight million units, the highest certified album of 2017. The album has sold 573,900 copies in the United States as of March 2020, with 2,694,000 units consumed.

Upon release of This One's for You Too, the album reached a new peak of number four on the Billboard 200 in June 2018.

== Track listing ==
All tracks are written by Luke Combs, with additional co-writers as noted.

This One's for You track listing
No.	Title	Writer(s)	Length
1.	"Out There"	Jacob Bryant; Ray Fulcher; James McNair	3:23
2.	"Memories Are Made Of"	Fulcher; Cody Webb	3:36
3.	"Lonely One"	Erin O'Keefe; Drew Parker	3:26
4.	"Beer Can"	Fulcher; McNair	3:30
5.	"Hurricane"	Thomas Archer; Taylor Phillips	3:43
6.	"One Number Away"	Sammy Mitchell; Steven Andre Battey; Robert Williford	3:42
7.	"Don't Tempt Me"	Joseph Costa; Williford	3:31
8.	"When It Rains It Pours"	Fulcher; Jordan Walker	4:02
9.	"This One's for You"	Fulcher; Pat Cooper	3:51
10.	"Be Careful What You Wish For"	Fulcher; Rob Crosby	2:55
11.	"I Got Away with You"	Fulcher; Tyler Reeve	3:50
12.	"Honky Tonk Highway"	Crosby; Fulcher	3:30
Total length:			42:59

All tracks are written by Luke Combs, with additional co-writers as noted.

This One's for You Too bonus tracks
No.	Title	Writer(s)	Length
13.	"Houston, We Got a Problem"	Randy Montana; Jonathan Singleton	3:12
14.	"Must've Never Met You"	Singleton; Robert Williford	3:19
15.	"Beautiful Crazy"	Wyatt Durrette; Williford	3:13
16.	"A Long Way"	Sam Grayson; Larry McCoy	3:37
17.	"She Got the Best of Me"	Rob Snyder; Channing Wilson	3:03
Total length:			59:16

== Personnel ==
Adapted from liner notes.

Musicians

- Luke Combs – lead vocals (1–12)
- Jon Conley – electric guitar (1, 2, 4, 5, 7, 9)
- Howard Duck – organ (1, 2, 4, 5, 9), piano (2, 4, 5, 9), synthesizer (5, 9)
- Dave Francis – bass guitar (1–5, 7–12)
- Wil Houchens – piano (3, 12), organ (7, 8, 10, 12)
- Tyler King – background vocals (6)
- Brent Mason – electric guitar (10), acoustic guitar (11)
- Justin Meeks – drums (10, 11), percussion (11)
- Sammy Mitchell – electric guitar (6), acoustic guitar (6), bass guitar (6), background vocals (6)
- James McNair – background vocals (2)
- Scott Moffatt – synthesizer (1, 7, 8), programming (1–5, 7–12), electric guitar (2, 3, 4, 8–12), acoustic guitar (3, 8, 10), percussion (10, 12), bass guitar (10), background vocals (1–5, 7–12)
- Gary Morse – pedal steel guitar (3, 7, 8, 10, 11, 12), lap steel guitar (7, 8), banjo (7, 10, 11)
- Kurt Ozan – Dobro (2, 9), pedal steel guitar (6, 9)
- Rob Pennington – background vocals (2)
- Sol Philcox-Littlefield – electric guitar (3, 6, 7, 8, 10, 12)
- Brian Pruitt – drums (1, 2, 4, 5, 9), percussion (5), programming (5)
- Jerry Roe – drums (3, 7, 8, 12)
- Grady Saxman – drums (6), percussion (6)
- Bobby Terry – acoustic guitar (1, 2, 4, 5, 7, 9)
- Grace Anne Waller – background vocals (6)
- Rob Williford – acoustic guitar (6), background vocals (6)

Technical

- Jim Cooley – mixing (except 4, 9, 11, 12)
- Ben Cowherd – mixing (9)
- Alex Gilson – engineering
- Gold Cassette – studio
- Erik Hellerman – mixing (4, 11)
- Andrew Mendelson – mastering
- Sammy Mitchell – producer (6)
- Scott Moffatt – producer, mixing (12)
- Kenny Royster – engineering

=== This One's for You Too credits ===
Credits for This One's for You Too tracks (13–17) adapted from liner notes.

Musicians

- Dave Cohen – keyboards (13, 17)
- Luke Combs – lead vocals (13–17)
- Jon Conley – acoustic guitar (13), electric guitar (13, 17)
- Dave Francis – bass guitar (16)
- Doug Fraser – drums (13), percussion (13)
- Aubrey Haynie – fiddle (13, 15)
- Wil Houchens – keyboards (14, 15), piano (16), organ (16)
- Ben Jordan – bass guitar (13)
- Tim Marks – bass guitar (17)
- Brent Mason – electric guitar (16)
- Justin Meeks – drums (16)
- Carl Miner – acoustic guitar (14, 15)
- Scott Moffatt – background vocals (13–17), electric guitar (13–17), acoustic guitar (17), programming (13, 17), percussion (13, 14, 16), synthesizer (16)
- Gary Morse – pedal steel guitar (13–17)
- Sol Philcox-Littlefield – electric guitar (14, 15)
- Jerry Roe – drums (14, 15, 17), percussion (15, 17)
- Jimmie Lee Sloas – bass guitar (14, 15)
- Ilya Toshinsky – acoustic guitar (17), mandolin (17), banjo (17)

Technical

- Chris Lord-Alge – mixing (13)
- Jim Cooley – mixing (14, 16, 17)
- Alex Gilson – engineering
- Andrew Mendelson – mastering
- Scott Moffatt – producer (13–17), mixing (15)

== Charts ==
=== Weekly charts ===
Weekly chart performance for This One's for You
Chart (2017–2026)	Peak position
Australian Albums (ARIA)	5
Canadian Albums (Billboard)	10
Irish Albums (Official Charts)	11
New Zealand Albums (RMNZ)	22
Norwegian Albums (VG-lista)	25
Scottish Albums (Official Charts)	98
UK Albums (Official Charts)	32
UK Country Albums (Official Charts)	4
US Billboard 200	4
US Top Country Albums (Billboard)	1

Weekly chart performance for This One's for You Too
Chart (2018–2023)	Peak position
Scottish Albums (Official Charts)	74
Swedish Albums (Sverigetopplistan)	43
UK Album Downloads (Official Charts)	77
UK Country Albums (Official Charts)	5

=== Year-end charts ===
2017 year-end chart performance for This One's for You
Chart (2017)	Position
US Billboard 200	109
US Top Country Albums (Billboard)	14

2018 year-end chart performance for This One's for You
Chart (2018)	Position
Australian Albums (ARIA)	42
Australian Country Albums (ARIA)	3
Canadian Albums (Billboard)	36
US Billboard 200	20
US Top Country Albums (Billboard)	1

2019 year-end chart performance for This One's for You
Chart (2019)	Position
Australian Albums (ARIA)	19
Canadian Albums (Billboard)	18
US Billboard 200	11
US Top Country Albums (Billboard)	1

2020 year-end chart performance for This One's for You
Chart (2020)	Position
Australian Albums (ARIA)	17
Canadian Albums (Billboard)	19
US Billboard 200	22
US Top Country Albums (Billboard)	2

2021 year-end chart performance for This One's for You
Chart (2021)	Position
Australian Albums (ARIA)	24
Canadian Albums (Billboard)	24
US Billboard 200	29
US Top Country Albums (Billboard)	3

2022 year-end chart performance for This One's for You
Chart (2022)	Position
Australian Albums (ARIA)	19
Canadian Albums (Billboard)	22
US Billboard 200	32
US Top Country Albums (Billboard)	4

2023 year-end chart performance for This One's for You
Chart (2023)	Position
Australian Albums (ARIA)	14
Canadian Albums (Billboard)	15
New Zealand Albums (RMNZ)	48
US Billboard 200	31
US Top Country Albums (Billboard)	7

2024 year-end chart performance for This One's for You
Chart (2024)	Position
Australian Albums (ARIA)	16
Australian Country Albums (ARIA)	2
Canadian Albums (Billboard)	23
Swedish Albums (Sverigetopplistan)	73
US Billboard 200	33
US Top Country Albums (Billboard)	9

2025 year-end chart performance for This One's for You
Chart (2025)	Position
Australian Albums (ARIA)	21
US Billboard 200	59
US Top Country Albums (Billboard)	11

=== Decade-end charts ===
Decade-end chart performance for This One's for You
Chart (2010–2019)	Position
US Billboard 200	60

== Certifications ==
Certifications for This One's for You
Region	Certification	Certified units/sales
Australia (ARIA)	3× Platinum	210,000^{‡}
Canada (Music Canada)	7× Platinum	560,000^{‡}
New Zealand (RMNZ)	4× Platinum	60,000^{‡}
Norway (IFPI Norway)	Platinum	20,000^{‡}
Sweden (GLF)	Gold	15,000^{‡}
United Kingdom (BPI)	Platinum	300,000^{‡}
United States (RIAA)	8× Platinum	8,000,000^{‡}
^{‡} Sales+streaming figures based on certification alone.
