= She Got the Best of Me =

2018 song by Luke Combs

Single by Luke Combs

from the album This One's for You Too
- Released: July 9, 2018
- Genre: Country
- Length: 3:03
- Label: Columbia Nashville
- Songwriters: Luke Combs; Rob Snyder; Channing Wilson
- Producer: Scott Moffatt

Luke Combs singles chronology
| "One Number Away" (2018) | "She Got the Best of Me" (2018) | "Beautiful Crazy" (2018) |

"She Got the Best of Me" is a song by American country music singer Luke Combs. He wrote the song with Rob Snyder and Channing Wilson. It is the fourth single from his debut album This One's for You, to which it was added as a bonus track.

== Content ==
The song is a "soaring power ballad" in which the narrator says that a former lover "got the best of [him]" because he is unable to stop thinking of her. Combs said that he wrote the song four years prior to its recording, at a bar in Nashville, Tennessee called the Tin Roof. It was added to Combs's debut album This One's for You as a bonus track due to fan demand.

"She Got the Best of Me" is composed in the key of B major with a main chord pattern of E–B–G♯m–F♯. The song has a moderate tempo in cut time.

== Chart performance ==
"She Got the Best of Me" reached number one on the Billboard Country Airplay chart dated October 27, 2018, becoming Combs' fourth consecutive number one single, and making him the first solo artist to send all of his or her first four singles to number one since the inception of Nielsen SoundScan in January 1990, and the third act to do so overall, behind Brooks & Dunn and Florida Georgia Line. The song was certified Diamond on June 13, 2025 by the RIAA. It has sold 421,000 copies in the United States as of July 2019.

== Music video ==
The music video was created by TA Films. The song contains references to previous videos of Combs's, including characters from the videos to "Hurricane" and "One Number Away", and visual references to other songs from Combs's album.

== Charts ==
=== Weekly charts ===
2018–2019 weekly chart performance for "She Got the Best of Me"
| Chart (2018–2019) | Peak position |
|---|---|
| Canada Hot 100 (Billboard) | 52 |
| Canada Country (Billboard) | 1 |
| US Billboard Hot 100 | 31 |
| US Hot Country Songs (Billboard) | 2 |
| US Country Airplay (Billboard) | 1 |

2022–2023 weekly chart performance for "She Got the Best of Me"
| Chart (2022–2023) | Peak position |
|---|---|
| Australia (ARIA) | 59 |

=== Year-end charts ===
2018 year-end chart performance for "She Got the Best of Me"
| Chart (2018) | Position |
|---|---|
| US Country Airplay (Billboard) | 39 |
| US Hot Country Songs (Billboard) | 23 |

2019 year-end chart performance for "She Got the Best of Me"
| Chart (2019) | Position |
|---|---|
| US Country Airplay (Billboard) | 44 |
| US Hot Country Songs (Billboard) | 22 |
| US Rolling Stone Top 100 | 88 |

== Certifications ==
Certifications for "She Got the Best of Me"
| Region | Certification | Certified units/sales |
|---|---|---|
| Australia (ARIA) | 6× Platinum | 420,000^{‡} |
| Canada (Music Canada) | Platinum | 80,000^{‡} |
| New Zealand (RMNZ) | 3× Platinum | 90,000^{‡} |
| United Kingdom (BPI) | Platinum | 600,000^{‡} |
| United States (RIAA) | Diamond | 10,000,000^{‡} |
^{‡} Sales+streaming figures based on certification alone.
