= Keeping Score (Dan + Shay song) =

2020 song by Dan + Shay

Promotional single by Dan + Shay featuring Kelly Clarkson

from the album Dan + Shay
- Released: June 15, 2018
- Studio: Ocean Way Nashville (Nashville, TN); Warner Bros. Studios (Nashville, TN); Abby Road Studios (Nashville, TN); The Tzudio (Nashville, TN); Capitol Studios (Los Angeles, CA)
- Genre: Country; soul
- Length: 3:40
- Label: Warner Music Nashville
- Songwriters: Dan Smyers; Jordan Reynolds; Laura Veltz
- Producers: Scott Hendricks; Dan Smyers

Audio video
- "Keeping Score" (Icon video) on YouTube

"Keeping Score" is a song by American duo Dan + Shay, from their self-titled second studio album. Featuring American singer Kelly Clarkson, it was released on June 15, 2018, as the fifth track and a promotional single from the album. It was produced by Scott Hendricks with duo member Dan Smyers, who co-wrote it with Jordan Reynolds and Laura Veltz. The song, a soulful country anthem, is about savoring life's special moments rather than anticipating what's around the corner.

Receiving a positive response from music pundits as a standout track from the Dan + Shay album, it garnered an Academy of Country Music Award nomination for Musical Event of the Year at the 54th Academy of Country Music Awards. Charting within the top forty of the Billboard Hot Country Songs chart, it was eventually certified Gold by the Recording Industry Association of America and Music Canada.

== Background and composition ==
"Keeping Score" is a work by Dan Smyers (one half of Dan + Shay), who co-wrote it with Jordan Reynolds and Laura Veltz and co-produced it with Scott Hendricks. In their writing session, he revealed that they were inspired by where they are in their lives, he commented, "Everything is so quantifiable in this day in age." Lyrically, "Keeping Score" is a soulful country anthem that stresses the importance of existing in the moment with one another rather than worrying about strategies for accumulating more things. Sounds Like Nashville's Cillea Houghton described the song's message as "important", which was "that time is fleeting and precious, and moments with the ones we love are meant to be cherished".

As the song's master recording begins with the duo performing the first verse, the track then presents vocals by American singer Kelly Clarkson, who joins Shay Mooney (the duo's other half) in the chorus. In a review by Rolling Stone, the vocals' intensity steadily rises as the song progresses, before finishing with a firework-like spirit as final vamp. Smyers promulgated that it was an honor to sing with her during the song's release. He remarked, "Not only is she one of the most incredible vocalists of our generation, she is one of the most genuine, kind-hearted people we have ever met. We're glad this song resonated with her as much as it did with us."

== Release and reception ==
"Keeping Score" was originally released on June 15, 2018, by Warner Music Nashville as the fifth track and a promotional single a week before the album's release. An acoustic version was later issued on April 7, 2019.

=== Chart performance ===
"Keeping Score" debuted on the Billboard Hot Country Songs chart at number 32 on the week ending June 30, 2018, where it stayed for three non-consecutive weeks. It also appeared on its component Country Digital Song Sales chart at number six. On the Billboard Digital Song Sales and Hot Canadian Digital Song Sales charts, the song charted at numbers 30 and 37, respectively. It was later certified Gold by the Recording Industry Association of America and Music Canada in 2020.

=== Critical response ===
"Keeping Score" has received a positive response from music critics. Reviewing for Rolling Stone, columnist Jon Freeman praised Mooney's soulful melody in joining Clarkson's successful rendition of stratospheric-ally high notes. In addition to praising the lyrical dexterity and emotional power of the duo, Carena Liptak of The Boot commended the powerhouse combination of Smyers's and Clarkson's vocal prowess that makes the song "a standout track". Idolator's Mike Nied complimented the track's stripped-back production as "swelling" and its lyrics as "boasting a powerful message", and praised Clarkson's voice as adding a nice dimension to the record. In her review of the album, Sounds Like Nashville's Cillea Houghton wrote that the "thoughtful" song proves that the duo can tell an insightful story just as captivating as a romantic one, and praised Clarkson as the perfect duet partner to honor the song's meaning with her "stunning" vocals. Following its release, "Keeping Score" was later nominated for an Academy of Country Music Award for Musical Event of the Year at the 54th Academy of Country Music Awards, which marked as the fifth nomination for both artists.

== Live performances ==
Dan + Shay has included "Keeping Score" in their set-list of their self-titled tour which ran from 2019 to 2020. On April 7, 2019, the duo were joined by Clarkson to perform the song for the first time on television during the live broadcast of the 54th Academy of Country Music Awards. Rolling Stone's Stephen Betts reported the performance as "crowd-pleasing". Reporting for Billboard, Stephen Daw commended the "moving" performance as "nailing every single note and lick" of the track, and wrote that the group, halfway joined by Clarkson, has managed to earn the respect of the already-electrified audience.

== Charts ==
Chart performance for "Keeping Score"
Chart (2018–2019)	Peak position
Hot Canadian Digital Song Sales (Billboard)	37
US Digital Song Sales (Billboard)	30
US Hot Country Songs (Billboard)	32

== Certifications ==
Certifications for "Keeping Score"
Region	Certification	Certified units/sales
Canada (Music Canada)	Platinum	80,000^{‡}
United States (RIAA)	Gold	500,000^{‡}
^{‡} Sales+streaming figures based on certification alone.

== Release history ==
List of releases of "Keeping Score"
Region	Date	Format	Label	Catalog number	Ref.
Various	June 15, 2018	Promotional single	Warner Music Nashville	USWB11800926	
United States	April 7, 2019	Acoustic version	Warner Music Nashville	USWB11901060	
