= Speechless (Dan + Shay song) =

Single by Dan + Shay

from the album Dan + Shay
- Released: August 6, 2018
- Genre: Country pop
- Length: 3:33
- Label: Warner Nashville
- Songwriters: Dan Smyers; Shay Mooney; Jordan Reynolds; Spencer Saylor; Laura Veltz
- Producers: Scott Hendricks; Dan Smyers

Dan + Shay singles chronology
"Tequila" (2018)	"Speechless" (2018)	"All to Myself" (2019)

"Speechless" is a song recorded by American country music duo Dan + Shay for their 2018 self-titled third studio album. The song was written by Dan Smyers and Shay Mooney along with Jordan Reynolds, Spencer Saylor and Laura Veltz. It was first released digitally as a promotional single on May 18, 2018. "Speechless" was serviced to country radio on August 6, 2018 as the album's second official single. A new version featuring Tori Kelly was released on June 6, 2019.

"Speechless" reached number one on both the Billboard Hot Country Songs and Country Airplay charts. It also peaked at number 24 on the Billboard Hot 100. In Canada, the song has reached number 2 on the Canada Country airplay chart and at number 41 on the Canadian Hot 100. "Speechless" was certified seven times platinum by the Recording Industry Association of America (RIAA) and triple platinum by Music Canada.

== Composition ==
The song is composed in the key of D♭ major with a main chord pattern of D♭-Fm-G♭_{maj}7-E♭_{min}7. It has an approximate tempo of 66 beats per minute.

== Critical reception ==
In a review of the album, Jon Freeman of Rolling Stone wrote that the duo are "at their most collectively potent" on "soulful cuts" like "Speechless," in which the production reinforces the song's message.

== Commercial performance ==
"Speechless" debuted at number 30 on the Hot Country Songs chart dated June 2, 2018, and reached number one on the chart dated December 1, 2018, the duo's first number one on that chart. It stayed at number one for eight weeks. "Speechless" debuted at number 46 on the Country Airplay chart dated August 18, 2018, and reached number one on the chart dated December 22, 2018. The song entered the Billboard Hot 100 chart dated September 22, 2018 at number 95, and peaked at number 24 in January 2019. "Speechless" was certified seven times platinum on May 9, 2024 by the RIAA. It has sold 619,000 copies in the United States as of March 2020.

== Music video ==
A music video directed by Patrick Tracy premiered May 18, 2018 concurrent with the song's digital release. The video features footage from Smyers' and Mooney's 2017 weddings, including the grooms' first looks at their brides, the brides walking down the aisle, and the couples' introductions at their respective receptions.

== Charts ==
=== Weekly charts ===
Chart (2018–2019)	Peak position
Canada Hot 100 (Billboard)	41
Canada AC (Billboard)	33
Canada Country (Billboard)	2
Canada Hot AC (Billboard)	33
US Billboard Hot 100	24
US Adult Contemporary (Billboard)	6
US Adult Pop Airplay (Billboard)	5
US Country Airplay (Billboard)	1
US Hot Country Songs (Billboard)	1
US Pop Airplay (Billboard)	17
US Rolling Stone Top 100	48

=== Year-end charts ===
Chart (2018)	Position
US Hot Country Songs (Billboard)	32
Chart (2019)	Position
US Billboard Hot 100	35
US Adult Contemporary (Billboard)	16
US Adult Top 40 (Billboard)	19
US Country Airplay (Billboard)	43
US Hot Country Songs (Billboard)	2
US Mainstream Top 40 (Billboard)	48
US Rolling Stone Top 100	45
Chart (2020)	Position
US Adult Contemporary (Billboard)	19

=== Decade-end charts ===
Chart (2010–2019)	Position
US Hot Country Songs (Billboard)	8

== Certifications ==
Region	Certification	Certified units/sales
Canada (Music Canada)	7× Platinum	560,000^{‡}
New Zealand (RMNZ)	Platinum	30,000^{‡}
United States (RIAA)	7× Platinum	7,000,000^{‡}
^{‡} Sales+streaming figures based on certification alone.

== Release history ==
Country	Date	Format	Label	Ref.
Various	May 18, 2018 (Note: As a promotional single.)	Digital download	Warner Bros.	
United States	August 6, 2018	Country radio	Warner Bros.	
United States	April 23, 2019	Contemporary hit radio	Warner Bros.	
Various	June 7, 2019	Digital download (Tori Kelly duet version)	Warner Bros.	
