= All to Myself (Dan + Shay song) =

Single by Dan + Shay

from the album Dan + Shay
- Released: May 3, 2018 (promotional) February 11, 2019
- Genre: Country pop
- Length: 2:49
- Label: Warner Nashville
- Songwriters: Dan Smyers; Shay Mooney; Jordan Reynolds; Nicolle Galyon
- Producers: Dan Smyers; Scott Hendricks

Dan + Shay singles chronology
"Speechless" (2018)	"All to Myself" (2018)	"10,000 Hours" (2019)

"All to Myself" is a song recorded by American country music duo Dan + Shay. It is the third single from their 2018 self-titled album. Duo members Dan Smyers and Shay Mooney wrote the song with Jordan Reynolds and Nicolle Galyon; Smyers also co-produced the song with Scott Hendricks.

== Content and history ==
The duo released the song to country radio on February 11, 2019, as the third single from their self-titled third studio album. The duo's members, Dan Smyers and Shay Mooney, co-wrote the song with Nicolle Galyon and Jordan Reynolds.

Billy Dukes of Taste of Country said of the song's composition that "Snaps and a thin guitar lick introduce Shay Mooney's vocals before a more robust and organic arrangement powers the song, starting at the chorus." The lyrics tell of a man's desire to have his lover "all to [him]self".

== Commercial performance ==
The song was certified triple platinum on May 9, 2024. It has sold 123,000 copies in the United States as of September 2019.

It reached the top of the Billboard Country Airplay chart dated August 24, 2019, becoming Dan + Shay's sixth Number One hit.

== Music video ==
The video for the song was directed by Patrick Tracy and was released on May 9, 2018. Using the theme of shadows, it shows the duo (who are never seen together) performing the song in a dark room, while shadows (which are pieces of paper with the song's lyrics cut into them) as well as shadows of people making out appear on a wall in the same room.

== Charts ==
=== Weekly charts ===
Chart (2019)	Peak position
Canada Hot 100 (Billboard)	69
Canada Country (Billboard)	1
US Billboard Hot 100	31
US Country Airplay (Billboard)	1
US Hot Country Songs (Billboard)	3
US Rolling Stone Top 100	40

=== Year-end charts ===
Chart (2019)	Position
US Billboard Hot 100	97
US Country Airplay (Billboard)	16
US Hot Country Songs (Billboard)	15

== Certifications ==
Region	Certification	Certified units/sales
Canada (Music Canada)	3× Platinum	240,000^{‡}
United States (RIAA)	3× Platinum	3,000,000^{‡}
^{‡} Sales+streaming figures based on certification alone.
