= List of Top Country Albums number ones of 2019 =

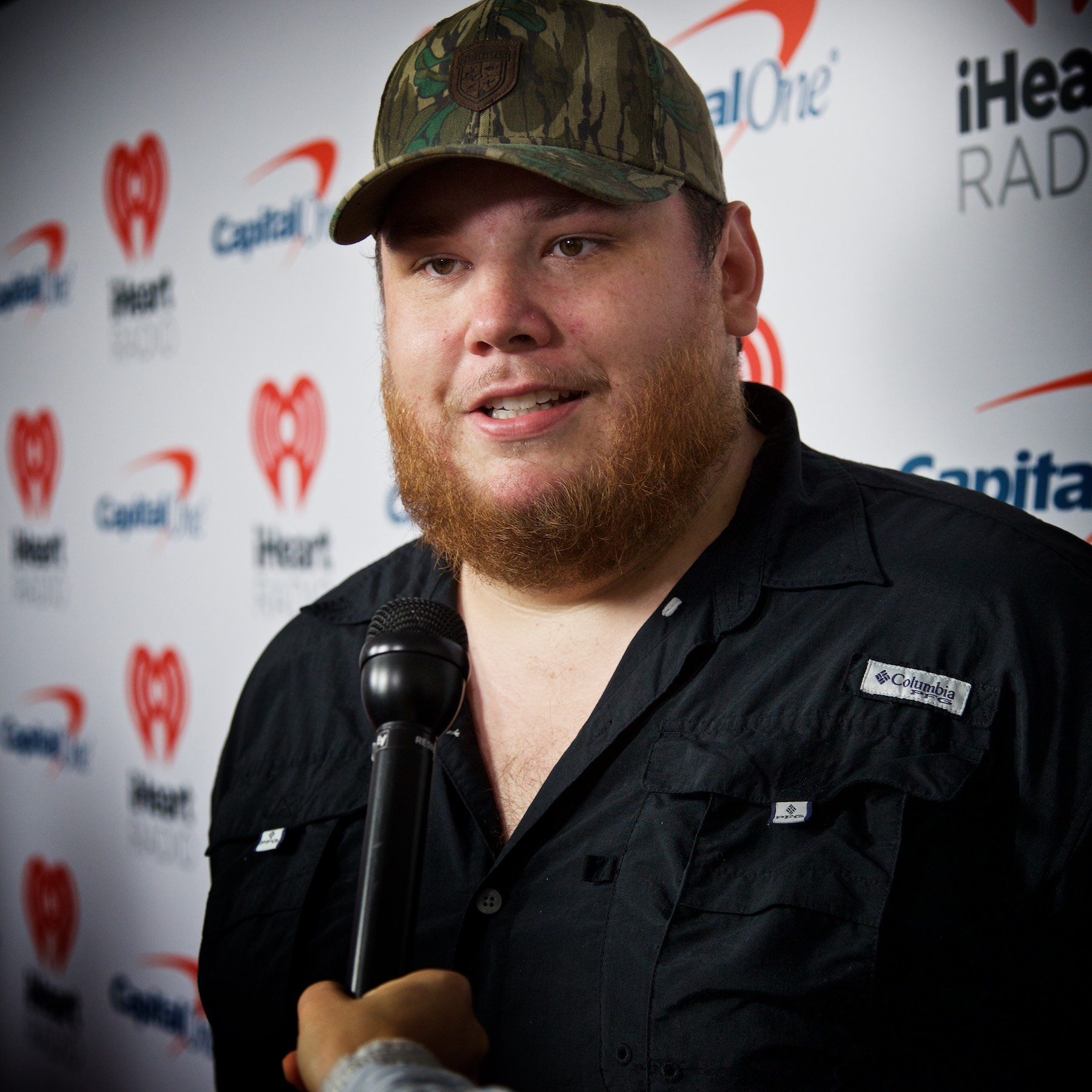
Luke Combs dominated the top of the chart in 2019, spending a total of 34 weeks at number one with three albums. No other act spent more than one week in the top spot.

Top Country Albums is a chart that ranks the top-performing country music albums in the United States, published by Billboard. In 2019, 21 different albums topped the chart, based on multi-metric consumption, blending traditional album sales, track equivalent albums, and streaming equivalent albums.

The number-one position was dominated in 2019 by Luke Combs, who spent 34 weeks in the top spot during the year. His debut album This One's for You had first reached number one in the summer of 2017, but continued to return intermittently to the top of the chart for more than two years, particularly after the release of a deluxe edition in mid-2018. In 2019 the album had ten separate spells at number one, totalling 29 weeks atop the chart. Having already spent 21 weeks at number one in 2017 and 2018, the album reached a total of 50 weeks in the top spot, tying the record set by Shania Twain's album Come On Over for the highest total number of weeks at number one on the Top Country Albums chart. In June, The Prequel, a five-track EP, spent a single week at number one, and in November his second full-length album What You See Is What You Get reached the top spot, where it had spent four non-consecutive weeks by the end of the year. It also became the singer's first album to top the all-genres Billboard 200 chart, a feat also achieved by Thomas Rhett's album Center Point Road, which topped both listings in June.

Every other chart-topper of 2019 spent only a single week at number one, and no act other than Combs achieved more than one number one during the year in its own right, although Maren Morris reached number one with her solo album Girl and also as a member of the Highwomen, a supergroup of female country singers. Several acts reached the top of the chart for the first time in 2019, beginning in the year's first week when former television and film singing cowboy Gene Autry was at number one with Rudolph the Red Nosed Reindeer and Other Christmas Classics, giving him his first chart-topper more than 20 years after his death. Other acts to reach the top of the chart for the first time during the year were Cody Johnson with Ain't Nothin' to It, Tyler Childers with Country Squire, the Highwomen with their self-titled debut album, Midland with Let It Roll, and the band Whiskey Myers with its eponymous album. In contrast, Honky Tonk Time Machine was the 27th number one for veteran country star George Strait, a record number of chart-toppers for a single artist. The year's final number one was Fully Loaded: God's Country, a compilation album by Blake Shelton, which topped the chart in the issue of Billboard dated December 28.

== Chart history ==
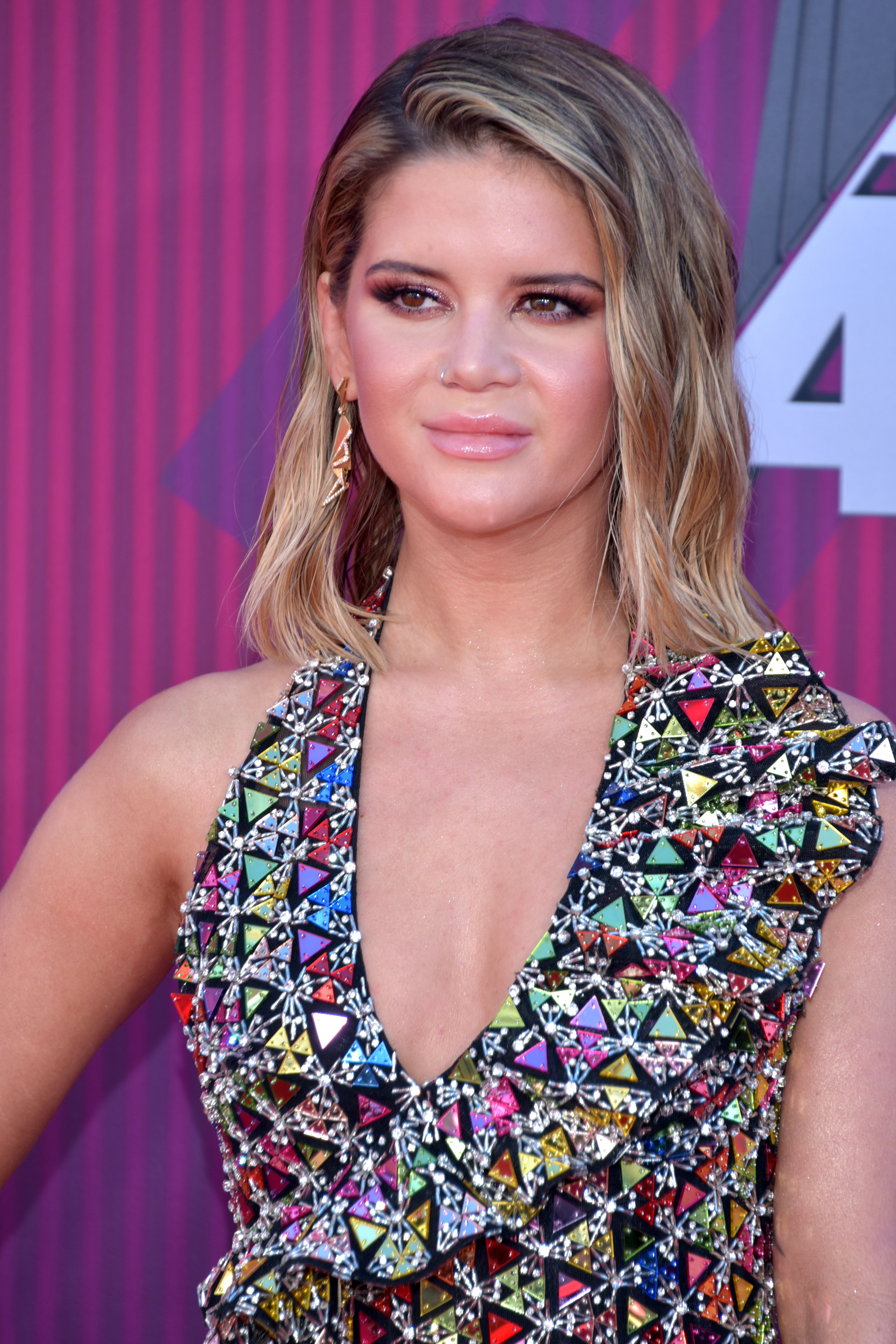
Maren Morris topped the chart with a solo album and also as part of the group The Highwomen.

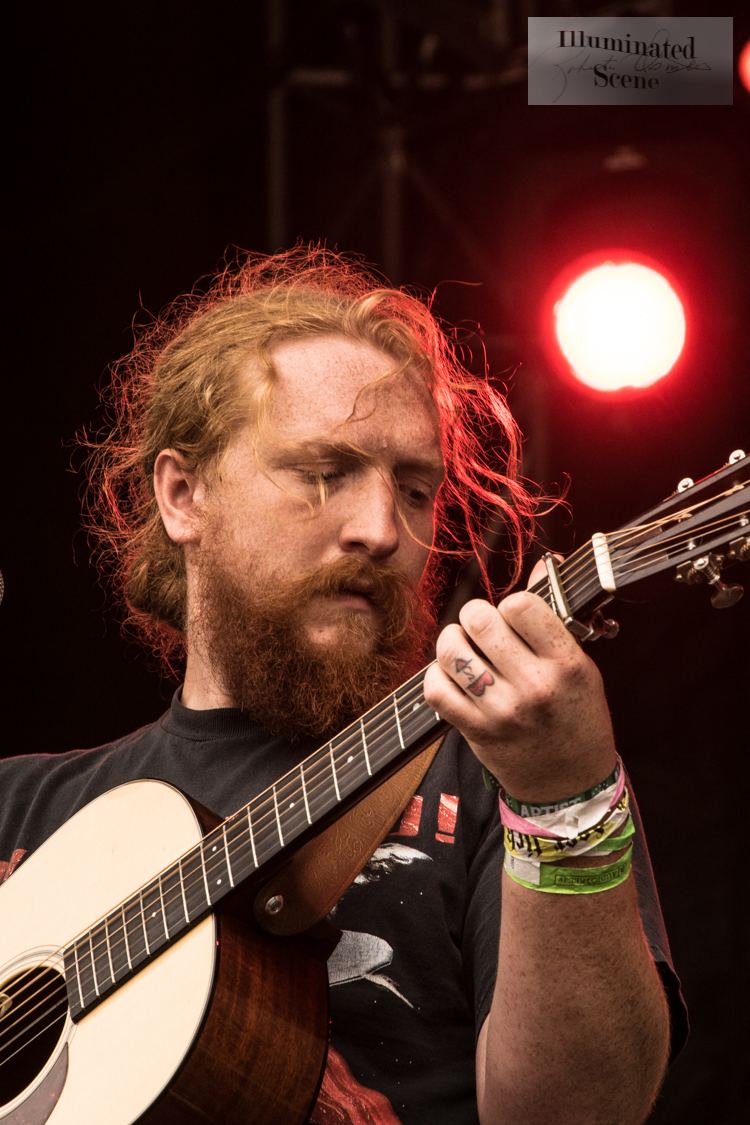
Country Squire was the first number one for Tyler Childers.

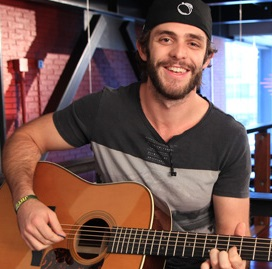
Center Point Road was a crossover success for Thomas Rhett, also topping the Billboard 200.

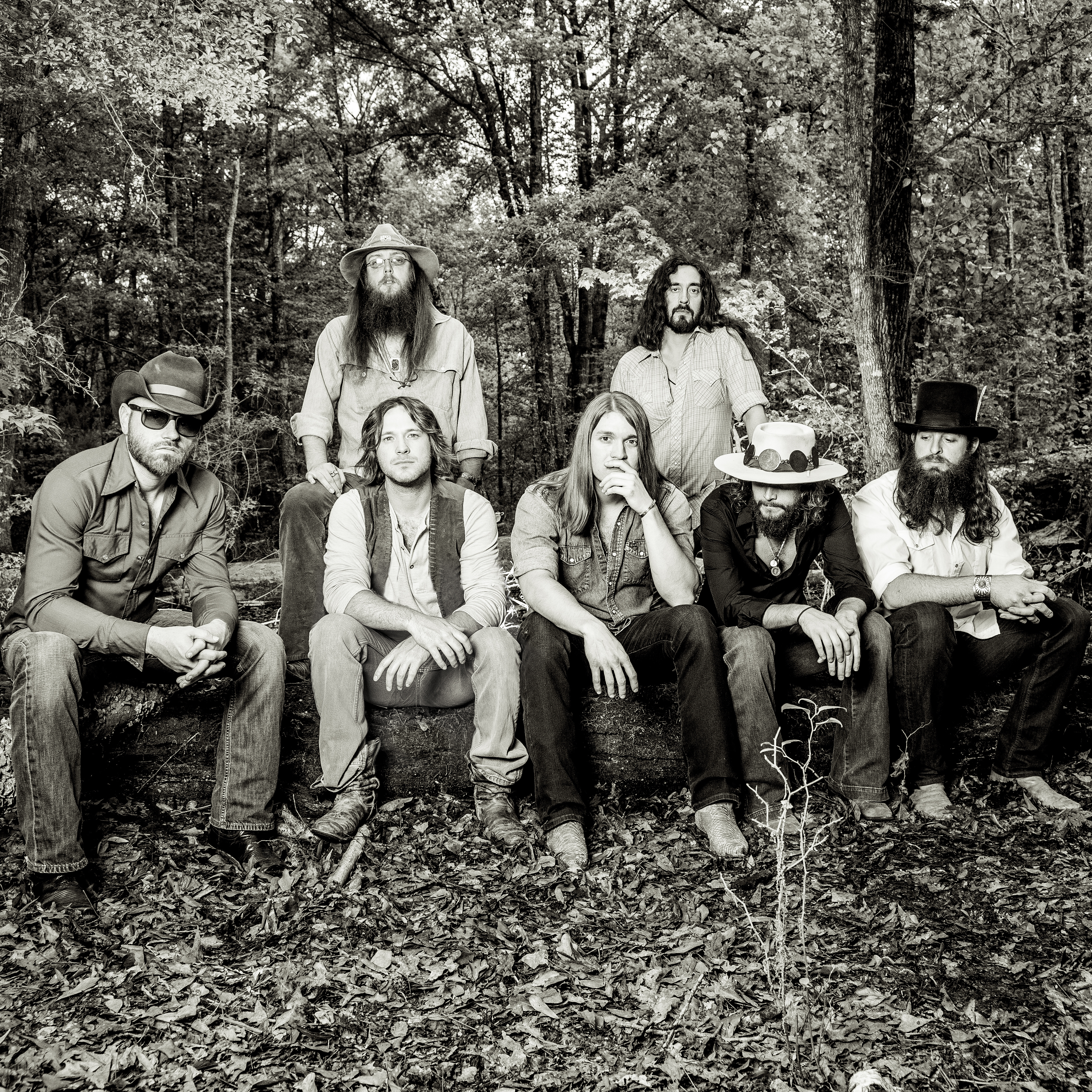
The band Whiskey Myers gained its first number one with its self-titled album.

Issue date	Title	Artist(s)	Ref.
January 5	Rudolph the Red Nosed Reindeer and Other Christmas Classics	Gene Autry	
January 12	This One's for You	Luke Combs	
January 19	This One's for You	Luke Combs	
January 26	This One's for You	Luke Combs	
February 2	Ain't Nothin' to It	Cody Johnson	
February 9	This One's for You	Luke Combs	
February 16	This One's for You	Luke Combs	
February 23	Golden Hour	Kacey Musgraves	
March 2	Can't Say I Ain't Country	Florida Georgia Line	
March 9	This One's for You	Luke Combs	
March 16	This One's for You	Luke Combs	
March 23	Girl	Maren Morris	
March 30	This One's for You	Luke Combs	
April 6	This One's for You	Luke Combs	
April 13	Honky Tonk Time Machine	George Strait	
April 20	Reboot	Brooks & Dunn	
April 27	This One's for You	Luke Combs	
May 4	This One's for You	Luke Combs	
May 11	This One's for You	Luke Combs	
May 18	This One's for You	Luke Combs	
May 25	This One's for You	Luke Combs	
June 1	This One's for You	Luke Combs	
June 8	This One's for You	Luke Combs	
June 15	Center Point Road	Thomas Rhett	
June 22	The Prequel (EP)	Luke Combs	
June 29	This One's for You	Luke Combs	
July 6	This One's for You	Luke Combs	
July 13	This One's for You	Luke Combs	
July 20	This One's for You	Luke Combs	
July 27	This One's for You	Luke Combs	
August 3	This One's for You	Luke Combs	
August 10	This One's for You	Luke Combs	
August 17	Country Squire	Tyler Childers	
August 24	This One's for You	Luke Combs	
August 31	This One's for You	Luke Combs	
September 7	Let It Roll	Midland	
September 14	This One's for You	Luke Combs	
September 21	The Highwomen	The Highwomen	
September 28	This One's for You	Luke Combs	
October 5	The Owl	Zac Brown Band	
October 12	Whiskey Myers	Whiskey Myers	
October 19	Fire & Brimstone	Brantley Gilbert	
October 26	This One's for You	Luke Combs	
November 2	This One's for You	Luke Combs	
November 9	Old Dominion	Old Dominion	
November 16	Wildcard	Miranda Lambert	
November 23	What You See Is What You Get	Luke Combs	
November 30	What You See Is What You Get	Luke Combs	
December 7	9	Jason Aldean	
December 14	What You See Is What You Get	Luke Combs	
December 21	What You See Is What You Get	Luke Combs	
December 28	Fully Loaded: God's Country	Blake Shelton	
