= When It Rains It Pours (song) =

Single by Luke Combs

from the album This One's for You
- Released: June 19, 2017
- Genre: Country
- Length: 4:02
- Label: River House Artists; Columbia Nashville
- Songwriters: Luke Combs; Ray Fulcher; Jordan Walker
- Producer: Scott Moffatt

Luke Combs singles chronology
"Hurricane" (2016)	"When It Rains It Pours" (2017)	"One Number Away" (2018)

Music video
- "When It Rains It Pours" on YouTube

"When It Rains It Pours" is a song recorded by American country music singer Luke Combs. It was released in June 2017 as the second single from his debut album This One's for You (2017). Written by Combs, Ray Fulcher and Jordan Walker, the song is about a man gaining a streak of luck after his girlfriend left him, something that Combs himself had similarly gone through that acted as the basis for the song's creation. "When It Rains It Pours" reached number one on both the Billboard Country Airplay and Hot Country Songs charts, giving Combs his second number-one country hit overall. It also charted at number 33 on the Hot 100 chart. The song was certified thirteen-times Platinum by the Recording Industry Association of America (RIAA), and has sold 13,000,000 units as of October 2025. It achieved similar chart success in Canada, giving Combs his first number-one hit on the Canada Country chart and peaking at number 54 on the Canadian Hot 100. It garnered a 2× Platinum certification from Music Canada. Although it didn't chart in Australia, it was certified Diamond by the Australian Recording Industry Association (ARIA), denoting sales of 700,000 units in that country. An accompanying music video for the single, created by TA Films, retells the song's story. It was nominated for Video of the Year at the 2018 CMT Music Awards. For promotion, Combs performed the song live on Jimmy Kimmel Live! and CMT Crossroads with Leon Bridges.

== Background and development ==
Taste of Country's Sterling Whitaker described the song as "a more uptempo, lighthearted song that turns the old woe-is-me phrase on its ear with a savvy twist." In the song, the narrator humorously recalls a streak of favorable occurrences beginning with his girlfriend leaving him. Combs co-wrote the track with Jordan Walker of the country music duo Walker McGuire, and they both met with Ray Fulcher at a Nashville bar where they talked about wanting to write a song together, and went over the idea at Walker's house. The song's inspiration came from Combs having gone through a breakup and Walker suggesting that it be about making his ex-girlfriend mad.

Despite claims to have been written originally, the verses and chorus of "When it Rains It Pours" follow an almost identical chord progression and melody as Bon Jovi's 2005 song, "Who Says you Can't go Home".

== Commercial performance ==
"When It Rains It Pours" first entered the Billboard Country Airplay chart dated July 1, 2017, at number 56, and the Hot Country Songs chart at number 43 the same week. It reached atop the Country Airplay chart the week of November 3 and the Hot Country Songs chart three weeks later. On the Billboard Hot 100, it debuted at number 85 the week of August 19. Eleven weeks later, it peaked at number 33 the week of November 3, and remained on the chart for twenty weeks. The song, along with Combs' previous single, "Hurricane", was certified diamond by the Recording Industry Association of America (RIAA) on August 14, 2024, making Combs the first artist to have multiple country singles achieve this certification.

In Canada, the song debuted at number 96 on the Canadian Hot 100 the week of September 9, peaked at number 54 for two non-consecutive weeks, and stayed on the chart for twenty weeks. It was certified double platinum by Music Canada on August 23, 2018.

== Music video ==
The music video was created by TA Films. The song's music video retells the story, featuring Combs encountering his ex-girlfriend, and then driving, celebrating with his friends, getting a phone number from a waitress (played by his then-girlfriend, now wife Nicole Hocking), and celebrating over winning money on a lottery ticket. On June 6, 2018, it was nominated for Video of the Year at the 2018 CMT Music Awards, but lost to "I'll Name the Dogs" by Blake Shelton.

== Live performances ==
On November 8, 2017 (recorded October 2), Combs performed the track along with "One Number Away" on Jimmy Kimmel Live! after the 51st Annual Country Music Association Awards. On June 28, 2018, he performed it on CMT Crossroads as a duet with Leon Bridges.

== Personnel ==
From This One's for You liner notes.

Musicians

- Luke Combs – lead vocals
- Dave Francis – bass guitar
- Wil Houchens – organ
- Sol Philcox-Littlefield – electric guitar
- Scott Moffatt – acoustic guitar, electric guitar, background vocals, synthesizer, programming
- Gary Morse – pedal steel guitar, lap steel guitar
- Jerry Roe – drums

Technical

- Jim Cooley – mixing
- Scott Moffatt – producer

== Charts ==
=== Weekly charts ===
2017 weekly chart performance for "When It Rains It Pours"
Chart (2017)	Peak position
Canada Hot 100 (Billboard)	54
Canada Country (Billboard)	1
US Billboard Hot 100	33
US Hot Country Songs (Billboard)	1
US Country Airplay (Billboard)	1

2022–2026 chart performance for "When It Rains It Pours"
Chart (2022–2026)	Peak position
Australia (ARIA)	22
Ireland (IRMA)	16
Sweden Heatseeker (Sverigetopplistan)	5

=== Year-end charts ===
2017 year-end chart performance for "When It Rains It Pours"
Chart (2017)	Position
Canada Country (Billboard)	41
US Country Airplay (Billboard)	33
US Hot Country Songs (Billboard)	11

2018 year-end chart performance for "When It Rains It Pours"
Chart (2018)	Position
US Hot Country Songs (Billboard)	65

2022 year-end chart performance for "When It Rains It Pours"
Chart (2022)	Position
Australia (ARIA)	93

2023 year-end chart performance for "When It Rains It Pours"
Chart (2023)	Position
Australia (ARIA)	51

2024 year-end chart performance for "When It Rains It Pours"
Chart (2024)	Position
Australia (ARIA)	54

2025 year-end chart performance for "When It Rains It Pours"
Chart (2025)	Position
Australia (ARIA)	81

=== Decade-end charts ===
Decade-end chart performance for "When It Rains It Pours"
Chart (2010–2019)	Position
US Hot Country Songs (Billboard)	39

== Certifications ==
Certifications for "When It Rains It Pours"
Region	Certification	Certified units/sales
Australia (ARIA)	10× Platinum	700,000^{‡}
Canada (Music Canada)	2× Platinum	160,000^{‡}
New Zealand (RMNZ)	5× Platinum	150,000^{‡}
United Kingdom (BPI)	Platinum	600,000^{‡}
United States (RIAA)	13× Platinum	13,000,000^{‡}
^{‡} Sales+streaming figures based on certification alone.

== See also ==
- List of highest-certified singles in Australia
