= Dan + Shay (album) =

Studio album by Dan + Shay
- Released: June 22, 2018
- Studios: Ocean Way Nashville, Sound Stage Studios, Warner Bros. Studios, Abby Road Studios, The Tzudio and Skeye Studios (Nashville, Tennessee); Capitol Studios (Hollywood, California)
- Genre: Country pop
- Length: 35:16
- Label: Warner Nashville
- Producers: Scott Hendricks; Dan Smyers

Dan + Shay chronology
Obsessed (2016)	Dan + Shay (2018)	Good Things (2021)

Singles from Dan + Shay
- 1. "Tequila" Released: January 10, 2018; 2. "Speechless" Released: August 6, 2018; 3. "All to Myself" Released: February 11, 2019

Dan + Shay is the third studio album by American country duo Dan + Shay. It was released on June 22, 2018, via Warner Bros. Records Nashville. The album includes the singles "Tequila," "Speechless," and "All to Myself." It was nominated for the Country Music Association Award for Album of the Year and American Music Award for Favorite Country Album.

== Background ==
The duo announced the track listing via social media in May 2018. In addition to lead single "Tequila", they announced that the album would contain a duet with Kelly Clarkson. Group member Dan Smyers told Taste of Country, "I feel like this is the first time we really nailed it telling our story, saying what we want to say and putting the songs out that sound like we want to sound and how we want to be perceived. It feels really special, the whole body of work."

== Critical reception ==
Professional ratings
Review scores
Source	Rating
AllMusic	3/5 stars
Entertainment Focus	5/5 stars
Rolling Stone	3.5/5 stars
Sounds Like Nashville	(Positive)
The Young Folks	8/10

Cillea Houghton of Sounds Like Nashville reviewed the album with favor, stating that it "not only demonstrate how they've evolved musically on their self-titled record, but prove the purity that lives in their songwriting." It received 3.5 out of 5 stars from Rolling Stone, whose Jon Freeman wrote that the duo "maintain their low-key approach, delighting in simple, domestic pleasures and providing a reminder to pause and take a breath." Rating it 3 out of 5 stars, Stephen Thomas Erlewine of Allmusic was more mixed, saying that the album "may not be much more than aural wallpaper but that's all it's intended to be and, on that level, it's well executed: it's so slick and smooth, it doesn't make a single wave."

== Commercial performance ==
Dan + Shay debuted at number six on US Billboard 200 chart and number one on US Top Country Albums, selling 44,000 album-equivalent units (including 24,000 in pure album sales) in its first week of release. The album was certified double-platinum on June 22, 2023, by the Recording Industry Association of America (RIAA) for combined sales and album-equivalent units of over 2,000,000 units in the United States. The album has sold 167,400 copies in the United States as of December 2019, and 1,280,000 units consumed in total as of February 2020.

== Track listing ==
No.	Title	Writer(s)	Length
1.	"Alone Together"	Dan Smyers; Shay Mooney; Jesse Frasure; Hillary Lindsey	2:51
2.	"Tequila"	Smyers; Nicolle Galyon; Jordan Reynolds	3:16
3.	"What Keeps You Up at Night"	Chase Foster; Jordan Minton; Reynolds	3:21
4.	"All to Myself"	Smyers; Mooney; Reynolds; Galyon	2:49
5.	"Keeping Score" (featuring Kelly Clarkson)	Smyers; Reynolds; Laura Veltz	3:40
6.	"Make or Break"	Smyers; Mooney; Reynolds; Emily Weisband	2:35
7.	"Speechless"	Smyers; Mooney; Reynolds; Veltz	3:33
8.	"Stupid Love"	Smyers; Mooney; Jon Nite; David Hodges	3:14
9.	"No Such Thing"	Smyers; Mooney; David Lee Murphy; Matt Dragstrem	2:59
10.	"My Side of the Fence"	Mooney; Benjy Davis	3:39
11.	"Island Time"	Smyers; Mooney; Jimmy Robbins; Andy Albert	3:19

== Personnel ==
Adapted from AllMusic

Dan + Shay

- Shay Mooney – vocals
- Dan Smyers – vocals, programming, keyboards (2), synthesizers (2, 3), acoustic guitar (2), electric guitars (2, 11), percussion (3–8, 10, 11)

Additional Personnel

- Gordon Mote – acoustic piano (1, 3, 5, 7, 8, 10, 11), Wurlitzer electric piano (1, 3, 4), synthesizers (1, 3, 11), keyboards (2), string arrangements (2)
- Jesse Frasure – synthesizers (1), programming (1), percussion (1)
- Charlie Judge – synthesizers (2, 6), string arrangements (2), string conductor (2)
- Jordan Reynolds – keyboards (2), synthesizers (2, 4, 5), programming (4, 5, 7), percussion (4, 5), hammered dulcimer (4),
- Chase Foster – synthesizers (3), programming (3)
- David Hodges – programming (8), percussion (8)
- Matt Dragstrem – acoustic piano (9), synth horns (9), programming (9), electric guitars (9), slide guitar (9), backing vocals (9)
- Jimmy Robbins – programming (11)
- Derek Wells – electric guitars
- Bryan Sutton – acoustic guitar (1–3, 6, 7, 10, 11), dobro (2), banjo (5), hi-string acoustic guitar (10, 11), mandolin (10)
- Keith Urban – electric guitar solo (3)
- Ilya Toshinsky – acoustic guitar (4, 5, 8, 9), bouzouki (5), mandolin (5), banjo (8, 9)
- Russ Pahl – pedal steel guitar (2–6, 10, 11)
- Jimmie Lee Sloas – bass
- Nir Z – drums, percussion, programming (4, 9)
- Nicholas Gold – cello (2)
- Chris Farrell – viola (2)
- Jessica Blackwell – violin (2)
- Jimin Lim – violin (2)
- Abby Smyers – backing vocals (2)
- Kelly Clarkson – vocals (5)

=== Production ===
- Rohan Kohli – A&R direction
- Scott Hendricks – A&R direction, producer, additional recording, digital editing
- Dan Smyers – producer, additional recording, additional recording assistant, digital editing
- Jeff Balding – recording
- Jason Halbert – vocal recording, additional recording assistant (5)
- Josh Ditty – assistant engineer (1–5, 7–11)
- Matt Coles – assistant engineer (6)
- Justin Bennington – additional recording assistant (2–5, 9–11)
- Clark Schleicher – additional recording assistant (2–5, 9–11)
- Derek Wells – additional recording assistant (4, 5, 8)
- Kevin Harper – additional recording assistant (6)
- Joe Baldridge – vocal recording assistant
- Jeff Fitzpatrick – vocal recording assistant
- Brian David Willis – digital editing
- Nir Z – digital editing
- Jeff Juliano – mixing at The Compound (Harbeson, Delaware)
- Andrew Mendelson – mastering at Georgetown Masters (Nashville, Tennessee)
- Scott Johnson – production assistant
- Patrick Tracy – art direction, design
- Clark Mims Tedesco – artist development
- Scooter Braun, Jason Owen and Lisa Ray – management

== Charts ==
=== Weekly charts ===
Chart (2018)	Peak position
Australian Albums (ARIA)	15
Canadian Albums (Billboard)	11
New Zealand Heatseeker Albums (RMNZ)	6
Scottish Albums (Official Charts)	62
UK Country Albums (Official Charts)	2
US Billboard 200	6
US Top Country Albums (Billboard)	1

=== Year-end charts ===
Chart (2018)	Position
Australian Country Albums (ARIA)	48
US Billboard 200	115
US Top Country Albums (Billboard)	15

Chart (2019)	Position
Australian Country Albums (ARIA)	10
Canadian Albums (Billboard)	38
US Billboard 200	26
US Top Country Albums (Billboard)	2

Chart (2020)	Position
Australian Country Albums (ARIA)	19
US Billboard 200	94
US Top Country Albums (Billboard)	8

Chart (2021)	Position
Australian Country Albums (ARIA)	31
US Top Country Albums (Billboard)	26

Chart (2022)	Position
US Top Country Albums (Billboard)	61

== Certifications ==
Region	Certification	Certified units/sales
Canada (Music Canada)	3× Platinum	240,000^{‡}
New Zealand (RMNZ)	Gold	7,500^{‡}
United States (RIAA)	2× Platinum	2,000,000^{‡}
^{‡} Sales+streaming figures based on certification alone.
