= Tequila (Dan + Shay song) =

Single by Dan + Shay

from the album Dan + Shay
- Released: January 10, 2018
- Genre: Country pop
- Length: 3:16
- Label: Warner Bros. Nashville
- Songwriters: Dan Smyers; Nicolle Galyon; Jordan Reynolds
- Producers: Dan Smyers; Scott Hendricks

Dan + Shay singles chronology
"Road Trippin'" (2017)	"Tequila" (2018)	"Speechless" (2018)

"Tequila" is a song recorded by American country music duo Dan + Shay for their self-titled third studio album. Dan Smyers co-wrote the song with Nicolle Galyon and Jordan Reynolds and co-produced the track with Scott Hendricks. It was released through Warner Bros. Nashville on January 10, 2018, as the album's lead single. "Tequila" was released to country radio on January 15, 2018. Smyers's wife, Abby Law Smyers, performs backing vocals on the song during the post-chorus "when I when I" hook. The song won the Grammy Award for Best Country Duo/Group Performance at the 61st Grammy Awards as well as both Single and Song of the Year at the 54th Academy of Country Music Awards.

"Tequila" reached number one on the Billboard Country Airplay and Hot Country Songs charts. The song also peaked at number 21 on the Hot 100, their highest charting single on that chart until 2019's "10,000 Hours". In Canada, the song reached number 59 on the Canadian Hot 100 and number one on the Canada Country chart. It has been certified Diamond by the Recording Industry Association of America and Music Canada.

== Composition ==
The song is performed in the key of B major in common time with a tempo of 86 beats per minute. It follows a chord progression of E–B–F♯(add4)–G♯m, and the duo's vocals span from F♯_{4} to B_{5}.

== Critical reception ==
Billy Dukes of Taste of Country wrote that the song is characterized by a "strong sense of melody and even stronger vocals", and complimented the songwriting as being "vivid and full of color". Stephen L. Betts of Rolling Stone noted that the duo successfully subvert expectations with the song's title and wrote that "Tequila" is a "nostalgic tale of heartbreak and regret."

== Chart performance ==
"Tequila" debuted at number 35 on the Billboard Country Airplay chart dated January 20, 2018. The song debuted at number 15 on the Hot Country Songs chart the following week. On the Hot 100 chart dated January 27, 2018, "Tequila" entered at number 84, while debuting in the top 10 of the all-genre Digital Songs component chart at number nine. "Tequila" has since peaked at number 21, becoming the duo's first top 40 single. It was the duo's highest charting single on that chart until "10,000 Hours" reached number four in October 2019. "Tequila" reached number one on the Country Airplay chart dated July 1, 2018, the same week its parent album debuted as the number one country album. The song remained at the top position the following week, making "Tequila" their first multi-week number-one. In February 2019, "Tequila" reached number one on Hot Country Songs, replacing its follow-up single, "Speechless". "Tequila" was certified double platinum by the Recording Industry Association of America in November 2018, and Diamond on October 22, 2026, for 10 million units in sales and streams. It is their bestselling song. The song has sold 707,000 copies in the United States as of February 2020.

The song entered the Canadian Hot 100 chart at number 100, the duo's first single to impact the chart since "From the Ground Up" reached number 77 in 2016. "Tequila" was certified Diamond by Music Canada in 2026. In July 2018, "Tequila" reached number one on the Canada Country airplay chart, becoming their highest-charting radio hit and first chart-topper in Canada.

== Music video ==
An accompanying music video was directed by Patrick Tracy with Cinematography by Jon Chema and premiered March 1, 2018. The video explores the love story between a skier, played by Mica Von Turkovich, and a hiker, played by Nyle DiMarco, who meet in a mountain range. The video was filmed on location in Breckenridge, Colorado and captured on 35mm movie film . Like the actor himself, DiMarco's character is deaf, and throughout the video he can be seen teaching Turkovich's character various words and phrases in sign language. The sign for tequila is featured prominently. After a brief romance, the pair separate when DiMarco's character departs to finish his journey alone. However, the two are reunited four years later at the bar where they first grabbed drinks.

Dan told Nash Country Daily that the duo were "so inspired by" Nyle's advocacy for the deaf community and hoped to use their video as another platform for this.

== Track listing ==
Digital download

1. "Tequila" – 3:16

Digital download (remix)

1. "Tequila" (R3hab remix) – 2:37

== Charts ==
=== Weekly charts ===
Chart (2018–2019)	Peak position
Australia (ARIA)	66
Canada Hot 100 (Billboard)	59
Canada AC (Billboard)	15
Canada CHR/Top 40 (Billboard)	40
Canada Country (Billboard)	1
Canada Hot AC (Billboard)	37
US Billboard Hot 100	21
US Adult Contemporary (Billboard)	11
US Adult Pop Airplay (Billboard)	10
US Country Airplay (Billboard)	1
US Hot Country Songs (Billboard)	1
US Pop Airplay (Billboard)	18
US Rolling Stone Top 100	71

=== Year-end charts ===
Chart (2018)	Position
US Billboard Hot 100	32
US Adult Top 40 (Billboard)	47
US Country Airplay (Billboard)	5
US Hot Country Songs (Billboard)	3
Chart (2019)	Position
US Billboard Hot 100	91
US Adult Contemporary (Billboard)	24
US Adult Top 40 (Billboard)	37
US Hot Country Songs (Billboard)	7
US Rolling Stone Top 100	55

=== Decade-end charts ===
Chart (2010–2019)	Position
US Hot Country Songs (Billboard)	4

== Certifications ==
Region	Certification	Certified units/sales
Australia (ARIA)	2× Platinum	140,000^{‡}
Canada (Music Canada)	Diamond	800,000^{‡}
New Zealand (RMNZ)	2× Platinum	60,000^{‡}
United Kingdom (BPI)	Silver	200,000^{‡}
United States (RIAA)	Diamond	10,000,000^{‡}
^{‡} Sales+streaming figures based on certification alone.

== Release history ==
Country	Date	Format	Version	Label	Ref.
Various	January 10, 2018	Digital download	Original	Warner Bros. Nashville	
United States	January 15, 2018	Country radio	Original	Warner Bros. Nashville	
Various	July 4, 2018	Digital download	R3hab remix	Warner Bros. Nashville	
United States	September 18, 2018	Contemporary hit radio	Original	Warner Bros. Nashville	
