= Beautiful Crazy =

Single by Luke Combs

from the album This One's for You Too
- Released: December 3, 2018
- Genre: Country
- Length: 3:13
- Label: Columbia Nashville
- Songwriters: Luke Combs; Wyatt Durrette; Robert Williford
- Producer: Scott Moffatt

Luke Combs singles chronology
"She Got the Best of Me" (2018)	"Beautiful Crazy" (2018)	"Beer Never Broke My Heart" (2019)

Acoustic version cover

"Beautiful Crazy" is a song recorded by American country music singer Luke Combs. The song, which he wrote with Wyatt Durrette and Robert Williford, is a bonus track to his 2017 debut album This One's for You. The song had gained viral attention prior to its release as a single.

== History ==
Before being released as a single, Combs posted videos to Facebook of himself performing the song. It also became a regular performance in his concerts, and in 2018, he re-issued his debut album This One's for You (titled This One's for You Too) with a studio version as a bonus track. It was officially sent to radio with an adds date of December 3, 2018. Taste of Country describes the song as "a slow, personal love song that truly showcases the singer's talents".

== Chart performance ==
On the Hot Country Songs chart dated May 19, 2018, "Beautiful Crazy" debuted at number 6, Combs's highest debut on that chart at the time. The song had not been released as a single at the time, but achieved this position through downloads and streaming following the release of This One's for You Too. The song reached the top 10 at Country Airplay while Combs' previous single "She Got the Best of Me" was still falling out of the top 10. It reached number one on the Country Airplay chart dated March 2, 2019, making Combs the first artist to send his or her first five singles to number one since the inception of Nielsen SoundScan in January 1990. It stayed there for seven weeks until it was dethroned by Brett Young's "Here Tonight", becoming Combs' longest reign at number one. The same week, it reached number one on the Hot Country Songs chart, becoming his second number one on that chart. It also reached number one on Country Streaming Songs and Country Digital Song Sales. The song's seven-week reign atop Country Airplay was the longest since the chart's inception in 2012 and the longest for a song based strictly off airplay since "Live Like You Were Dying" by Tim McGraw in 2004. It also stayed at number one on the Hot Country Songs chart for 11 weeks.

The song was certified 15× Platinum by the RIAA on October 6, 2025. It has sold 610,000 copies in the United States as of March 2020.

== Composition ==
"Beautiful Crazy" is a song by American country music artist Luke Combs, with a duration of 3 minutes and 13 seconds. The track has a tempo of 154 BPM but can also be played at half-time at 77 BPM. It is in the key of B major and has a 3/4 time signature. The song features moderate energy and is somewhat danceable.

== Personnel ==
From This One's for You Too liner notes.

- Luke Combs - lead vocals
- Aubrey Haynie – fiddle
- Wil Houchens – keyboards
- Carl Miner – acoustic guitar
- Scott Moffatt – electric guitar, background vocals, producer, mixing
- Gary Morse – pedal steel guitar
- Sol Philcox-Littlefield – electric guitar
- Jerry Roe – drums, percussion
- Jimmie Lee Sloas – bass guitar

== Charts ==
=== Weekly charts ===
2018–2019 weekly chart performance for "Beautiful Crazy"
Chart (2018–2019)	Peak position
Canada Hot 100 (Billboard)	35
Canada Country (Billboard)	1
US Billboard Hot 100	21
US Hot Country Songs (Billboard)	1
US Country Airplay (Billboard)	1
US Rolling Stone Top 100	57

2022–2025 chart performance for "Beautiful Crazy"
Chart (2022–2025)	Peak position
Australia (ARIA)	32
New Zealand Catalogue Singles (RMNZ)	28

=== Year-end charts ===
2018 year-end chart performance for "Beautiful Crazy"
Chart (2018)	Position
US Hot Country Songs (Billboard)	26

2019 year-end chart performance for "Beautiful Crazy"
Chart (2019)	Position
Canada (Canadian Hot 100)	82
US Billboard Hot 100	46
US Country Airplay (Billboard)	2
US Hot Country Songs (Billboard)	4
US Rolling Stone Top 100: Featuring Leon Bridges	35

2023 year-end chart performance for "Beautiful Crazy"
Chart (2023)	Position
Australia (ARIA)	66

2024 year-end chart performance for "Beautiful Crazy"
Chart (2024)	Position
Australia (ARIA)	80

=== Decade-end charts ===
Decade-end chart performance for "Beautiful Crazy"
Chart (2010–2019)	Position
US Hot Country Songs (Billboard)	13

== Certifications ==
Region	Certification	Certified units/sales
Australia (ARIA)	9× Platinum	630,000^{‡}
Canada (Music Canada)	3× Platinum	240,000^{‡}
New Zealand (RMNZ)	3× Platinum	90,000^{‡}
United Kingdom (BPI)	Platinum	600,000^{‡}
United States (RIAA)	15× Platinum	15,000,000^{‡}
^{‡} Sales+streaming figures based on certification alone.
