= 2026 in country music =

This is a list of notable events in country music that have occurred in 2026.

== Events ==
- January 13 – "Tennessee Whiskey" by Chris Stapleton becomes the first country song in history to be double diamond certified by the Recording Industry Association of America.
- January 14 – Sarah Trahern, CEO of the Country Music Association, announces that she would retire at the end of 2026, after twelve years in the role.
- January 16 – Suzy Bogguss is inducted as a member of the Grand Ole Opry by Reba McEntire, who was inducted as an Opry member 40 years earlier. Bogguss was invited on October 11, 2025, by Kathy Mattea, Terri Clark, and Trisha Yearwood.
- January 17 – Blake Shelton receives his 30th number one single on the Billboard Country Airplay chart with "Stay Country or Die Tryin'", placing him second to Kenny Chesney's 33 for the most number one singles on the chart.
- January 24 – Paul Brandt makes a post on X using lyrics from his 2005 single "Alberta Bound" that leads to a controversy, with some viewing it as an endorsement of the Alberta separatism movement.
- February 9 – "Choosin' Texas" by Ella Langley becomes the first song by a female artist (and the fourth song overall) to reach number one on the Hot Country Songs, Country Airplay, and all-genre Billboard Hot 100 charts simultaneously.
- March 2 – Megan Moroney and Ella Langley make history as the first pair of female country music artist to top the Billboard Hot 100 and the Billboard 200 simultaneously. Langley's "Choosin' Texas" spent a second week at number one on the Hot 100, while Moroney's Cloud 9 debuted at number one on the albums chart.
- March 10 – Jelly Roll is inducted as a member of the Grand Ole Opry by Lainey Wilson. He was invited by Craig Morgan on December 10, 2025.
- March 23 – "Choosin' Texas" becomes the first song by a female artist that topped the Hot Country Songs chart to also spend four weeks at number one on the Billboard Hot 100.
- April 11 – Justin Moore's "Time's Ticking" reaches number one on the Country Airplay chart in its 67th chart week, breaking the record for the most weeks spent by a song before topping the chart.
- April 24–26 – The 2026 edition of Stagecoach Festival takes place at Empire Polo Club in Indio, California, featuring headline performances from Cody Johnson, Lainey Wilson, and Post Malone.
- April 26 – Maddie & Tae play their final show together. The duo announced their plans to split in December 2025, citing Taylor Kerr's decision to spend more time with her family. Maddie Font plans to continue as a solo artist.
- June 8 – "Choosin' Texas" by Ella Langley spends a 28th week at number one on Hot Country Songs, surpassing Gabby Barrett's "I Hope" to become the most weeks spent at number one for a song by a female artist without another credited artist.
- June 9 – "I Knew It, I Knew You" by Taylor Swift, from the Toy Story 5 soundtrack, became the first song by a female artist to be added to every country radio station reporting to Mediabase in its first week.
- June 28 – Rhett Akins is invited to become a member of the Grand Ole Opry by Jon Pardi. He was inducted on October 13 by Pardi and Jamey Johnson.
- July 27 – "Choosin' Texas" by Ella Langley, reached its 15th week at number one on the Billboard Hot 100, becoming the second most weeks spent at number one for a song by a female solo artist behind Mariah Carey's "All I Want for Christmas Is You".
- August 7 – Charlie Worsham is invited to become a member of the Grand Ole Opry by Vince Gill.
- September 8 – "Choosin' Texas" by Ella Langley, reached its 21st week at number one on the Billboard Hot 100, further breaking the record for a non-holiday song, all-artists; the song was also named Billboard's "Song of the Summer".
- September 22 –
  - Neal McCoy was invited by Pam Tillis to become a member of the Grand Ole Opry.
  - "Choosin' Texas" spends a 23rd non-consecutive week at number one on the Billboard Hot 100, breaking the record set by Mariah Carey's "All I Want for Christmas Is You" and becoming the longest-running number one in the history of the chart.
- September 29 – Charles Kelley of Lady A revealed that he had been diagnosed with multiple myeloma, a blood cancer after going to the doctor for rib fractures.
- November 5 – Sammy Kershaw posted on his social media that he and his wife had been denied permission to walk the red carpet at the 60th Annual Country Music Association Awards. The post quickly went viral and several artists voiced their support for Kershaw. The CMA later released a statement on November 9, commenting that they were "deeply sorry anyone felt excluded," and that they were in touch with Kershaw's team.
- November 9 – Seaforth reunites as a duo, as original member Tom Jordan re-joins bandmate Mitch Thompson

== Top hits of the year ==
The following songs placed within the Top 20 on the Hot Country Songs, Country Airplay, or Canada Country charts in 2026:

=== Singles released by American and Australian artists ===
Songs	Airplay	Canada	Single	Artist	References
2	1	5	"20 Cigarettes"	Morgan Wallen	
8	2	1	"6 Months Later"	Megan Moroney	
14	2	3	"Ain't a Bad Life"	Thomas Rhett featuring Jordan Davis	
14	1	35	"All My Exes"	Lauren Alaina featuring Chase Matthew	
6	1	2	"Amen"	Shaboozey and Jelly Roll	
29	11	33	"Anytime Soon"	Jason Aldean	
2	1	1	"Be By You"	Luke Combs	
2	1	1	"Be Her"	Ella Langley	
27	19	48	"Be There in a Minute"	Thomas Rhett	
8	4	3	"Beautiful Things"	Megan Moroney	
2	1	1	"Been By Now"	Morgan Wallen	
7	6	1	"Better Me for You (Brown Eyes)"	Max McNown	
—	—	18	"Betty"	Carter Faith	
42	18	29	"Boots Off"	Jon Pardi	
2	1	1	"Boston"	Stella Lefty	
4	—	—	"Bottom of Your Boots"	Ella Langley	
9	1	2	"Brunette"	Tucker Wetmore	
14	1	2	"Carry On"	Kenny Chesney	
5	2	2	"Change My Mind"	Riley Green	
11	2	37	"Chevy Silverado"	Bailey Zimmerman	
1	1	1	"Choosin' Texas"	Ella Langley	
15	3	38	"Country and She Knows It"	Luke Bryan	
11	19	9	"Cowgirl"	Shaboozey	
7	—	31	"Dandelion"	Ella Langley	
9	2	1	"Days Like These"	Luke Combs	
8	1	1	"Don't Tell on Me"	Jason Aldean	
6	1	1	"Don't We"	Morgan Wallen	
15	34	32	"Dry Spell"	Kacey Musgraves	
13	11	27	"Empty Words"	Corey Kent	
20	11	31	"Ends of the Earth"	Ty Myers	
7	1	38	"The Fall"	Cody Johnson	
14	1	2	"Favorite Country Song"	Hardy	
14	1	6	"Get to Drinkin'"	Zach John King	
23	8	5	"Hands Up"	Jelly Roll	
—	16	—	"Holdin' It Down"	Chase Matthew	
41	17	23	"Horseback"	Cody Johnson	
10	6	36	"House Again"	Hudson Westbrook	
12	1	18	"How Far Does a Goodbye Go"	Jason Aldean	
3	13	14	"I Ain't Comin' Back"	Morgan Wallen featuring Post Malone	
3	1	1	"I Can't Love You Anymore"	Ella Langley and Morgan Wallen	
31	13	44	"I Dare You"	Rascal Flatts and Jonas Brothers	
1	2	1	"I Knew It, I Knew You"	Taylor Swift	
20	3	31	"It Won't Be Long"	George Birge	
4	2	1	"Jaded"	Koe Wetzel and Ella Langley	
16	1	9	"Kid Myself"	John Morgan	
4	24	43	"Last Thing You Need"	Morgan Wallen	
45	15	33	"Let Him In Anyway"	Blake Shelton	
5	1	1	"Loving Life Again"	Ella Langley	
—	22	13	"Making Good Time"	Old Dominion	
6	17	35	"McArthur"	Hardy featuring Eric Church, Tim McGraw and Morgan Wallen	
36	11	51	"Me & a Beer"	Chris Janson	
11	14	21	"Medicine"	Megan Moroney	
40	16	49	"Move On"	Kevin Powers and Shaboozey	
18	7	45	"Painted You Pretty"	Hudson Westbrook	
12	9	1	"Phone, Keys, Wallet"	Lainey Wilson and John Mayer	
2	—	—	"Plastic Cigarette"	Zach Bryan	
—	20	36	"Remember Me That Way"	Kenny Chesney	
10	5	2	"Rethink Some Things"	Luke Combs	
39	12	10	"Ride, Ride, Ride"	George Birge featuring Luke Bryan	
18	4	20	"Rocky Mountain Low"	Corey Kent and Koe Wetzel	
20	4	14	"Say So"	Dan + Shay	
7	—	53	"Say Why"	Zach Bryan	
2	1	1	"Sleepless in a Hotel Room"	Luke Combs	
12	31	32	"Snakeskin Boots"	Miranda Lambert and Ella Langley	
11	21	49	"Something to Lose"	Stella Lefty and Vincent Mason	
30	17	38	"A Song to Sing"	Miranda Lambert and Chris Stapleton	
21	12	22	"South of Sanity"	Zach Top	
22	1	4	"Stay Country or Die Tryin'"	Blake Shelton	
10	41	—	"Take Me Back (Leave Me There)"	Cody Johnson	
11	6	2	"Think as You Drunk"	Riley Green	
17	1	2	"Time's Ticking"	Justin Moore	
2	40	—	"Travelin' Soldier"	Cody Johnson	
11	2	1	"Turn This Truck Around"	Jordan Davis	
30	13	53	"Water at a Wedding"	Greylan James	
16	2	8	"What He'll Never Have"	Dylan Scott	
25	22	18	"Who Told You That"	Tucker Wetmore	
41	16	25	"Wish You Well"	Vincent Mason	
14	2	2	"Woman"	Kane Brown	
30	10	33	"Worth Your Wild"	Russell Dickerson	

=== Singles released by Canadian artists ===
Songs	Airplay	Canada	Single	Artist	References
—	—	4	"After Dark"	James Barker Band	
—	—	15	"Alternate Ending"	Thelma & James	
—	—	7	"Drink Around"	Dean Brody	
—	51	17	"Drink Things Through"	Josh Ross	
—	—	13	"Fools"	High Valley	
—	—	6	"Going Somewhere"	Tim Hicks	
—	17	10	"Golden Child"	Meghan Patrick	
—	—	5	"Good Time Goes"	Dallas Smith	
12	1	1	"Hate How You Look"	Josh Ross	
—	—	6	"Hometown Heroes"	The Reklaws and Dean Brody	
—	—	9	"Hurtin' Songs"	Brett Kissel and Dierks Bentley	
—	—	7	"I'm Leavin' You"	High Valley	
—	—	10	"Johnnie Walker (Back to Me)"	Josh Stumpf	
—	—	6	"Just Being Me"	Morgan Griffiths	
24	—	10	"Kingdom of Fear"	Cameron Whitcomb	
—	—	4	"Love Hate Love"	Owen Riegling	
—	—	5	"A Man Without a Woman"	Dean Brody	
—	—	12	"Me Without My Hometown"	Owen Riegling	
—	—	7	"Nobody Roads"	Josh Stumpf	
—	—	16	"The Pilot"	Tim Hicks	
—	—	13	"Put It on Me"	Sully Burrows	
—	—	9	"Safe Place to Break"	Meghan Patrick	
—	—	4	"Scared of Getting Sober"	Josh Ross	
—	—	18	"Shooting Star"	Sacha and Restless Road	
—	—	2	"Somebody I Know"	James Barker Band	
—	—	4	"Something Else"	Brock Phillips	
—	—	7	"Sunshine's Free"	Tenille Townes	
—	—	8	"Taillight This Town"	Owen Riegling	
—	—	5	"Thought About You"	Nate Haller	
—	—	7	"Under the Influence"	Tyler Joe Miller	

== Top new album releases ==
US	Album	Artist	Record label	Release date	Reference
1	With Heaven on Top	Zach Bryan	Belting Bronco/Warner	January 9	
1	Cloud 9	Megan Moroney	Sony/Columbia	February 20	
1	The Way I Am	Luke Combs	Columbia Nashville	March 20	
1	Dandelion	Ella Langley	Columbia Nashville	April 10	
6	Songs About Us	Jason Aldean	Broken Bow	April 24	
2	Middle of Nowhere	Kacey Musgraves	Lost Highway	May 1	
6	Is This Heaven? (EP)	Stella Lefty	Sandlot/Atlantic	May 15	
8	Banks of the Trinity	Cody Johnson	Warner Music Nashville	June 26	
4	The Outlaw Cherie Lee & Other Western Tales	Shaboozey	American Dogwood/Empire	July 31	
4	Long Way Home	Stella Lefty	Atlantic Outpost	August 21	
4	So Much for Goodbyes	Billy Strings	Reprise/Warner	August 28	
2	That's Just Me	Riley Green	Nashville Harbor	September 18	
8	Signs	Luke Bryan	MCA Nashville	September 18	
3	Silver Sands Marina	Kenny Chesney	Hey Now	September 25	
4	Crisco	Miranda Lambert	Big Loud	October 2	
10	The Day I Hang It Up	Gavin Adcock	Warner Nashville	October 2	
8	Dying in This House	Mack Geiger	Columbia	November 6	

=== Other top albums ===
US	Album	Artist	Record label	Release date	Reference
35	Heavy on the Soul	Ty Myers	RECORDS	March 27	
12	Broken View	Sam Barber	Atlantic Outpost	April 3	
46	Age of the Ram	Charley Crockett	Lone Star Rider/Island	April 3	
12	Flow State	Keith Urban	MCA	June 12	
14	The Night Champion	Koe Wetzel	Columbia	June 12	
41	Something to Say	Blake Whiten		July 3	
26	Little Miss Twain	Shania Twain	Republic Nashville	July 24	
31	Sunburn Mixtape	Tucker Wetmore	Back Blocks/UMG Nashville	July 31	
30	Young	Dan + Shay	Warner Nashville	August 21	
38	Thrasher	Brandon Flowers	Island	August 21	
19	Mule	Orville Peck	Warner	September 18	
	Dylan Marlowe	Dylan Marlowe	Sony Music Nashville	November 6	
	Made You Look	Hudson Westbrook	Warner Nashville	November 6	
	The Outlier	Sam Barber	Atlantic Outpost	November 6	
	Greylan James	Greylan James	Nashville Harbor	November 13	

=== Upcoming ===
Album	Artist	Record label	Release date	Reference
Keep Pressing On: 25 Years Of Dualtone	Various Artists	Dualtone	December 4	
Coming Home	The Jack Wharff Band	Big Machine	December 4	
Diamonds	Waylon Jennings		December 11	

== Hall of Fame inductees ==
=== Country Music Hall of Fame ===
(announced on March 20, 2026)

- Tim McGraw
- Paul Overstreet
- The Stanley Brothers

=== Canadian Country Music Hall of Fame ===
(announced on July 9 and July 30, 2026)

- The Wilkinsons
- Rob Kitchener

=== International Bluegrass Music Hall of Fame ===
(announced on September 11, 2026)

- Byron Berline
- Nashville Bluegrass Band
- The Lost and Found
- Barry Poss

== Deaths ==
- January 6 – Jim McBride, 78, American songwriter ("Chattahoochee")
- January 19 – Billy Parker, 88, American country music singer and DJ
- February 11 – Jerry Kennedy, 85, American record producer
- February 16 – Brett Jones, 69, American songwriter ("A Little Past Little Rock", "That's How Country Boys Roll", "If Heaven Wasn't So Far Away")
- March 22 – Ronnie Bowman, 64, American bluegrass guitarist and singer-songwriter
- April 16 – Don Schlitz, 73, American songwriter ("The Gambler", "When You Say Nothing at All", "Forever and Ever, Amen")
- April 20 – Wayne Moss, 88, American session guitarist ("Only Daddy That'll Walk the Line", "Oh, Pretty Woman")
- April 29 – David Allan Coe, 86, American singer-songwriter and outlaw country musician ("You Never Even Call Me by My Name", "Longhaired Redneck", "The Ride")
- June 9 – Bill Cody, 67, American radio personality (WSM) and Grand Ole Opry announcer
- June 22 – Clive Davis, 94, American record executive and co-founder of Arista Nashville
- July 2 – Tommy Hunter, 89, Canadian country singer and television host (The Tommy Hunter Show)
- July 10 – Jimmy Nichols, 64, American keyboardist and music director
- July 23 – Coy "Denver" Parton, 82, older brother of Dolly Parton
- August 16 – Hayden Panettiere, 36, actress and singer who portrayed Juliette Barnes in the ABC/CMT drama musical series Nashville and charted with several songs from the series
- August 25 – Dolly Parton, 80, American country music singer, songwriter, actress, and philanthropist ("Jolene", "I Will Always Love You", "9 to 5")
- August 29 – Frankie Miller, 95, American country music singer ("Blackland Farmer", "Family Man")
- September 4 – Jon Small, 79, music video and concert director known for his work with Garth Brooks, Reba McEntire and Travis Tritt, among many others
- October 10 – Rory Bourke, 84, American country music songwriter
- October 21 – John Anderson, 71, American country music singer-songwriter ("Swingin'", "Straight Tequila Night", "Seminole Wind")
- October 26 – Mark McGuinn, 58, American singer-songwriter ("Mrs. Steven Rudy")
- November 9 – Brian Ahern, 81, Canadian producer best known for his work with Emmylou Harris and Anne Murray.
- November 14 – Richard Sterban, 83, bass vocalist in the Oak Ridge Boys (bronchitis and pneumonia)
