= Ella Langley discography =

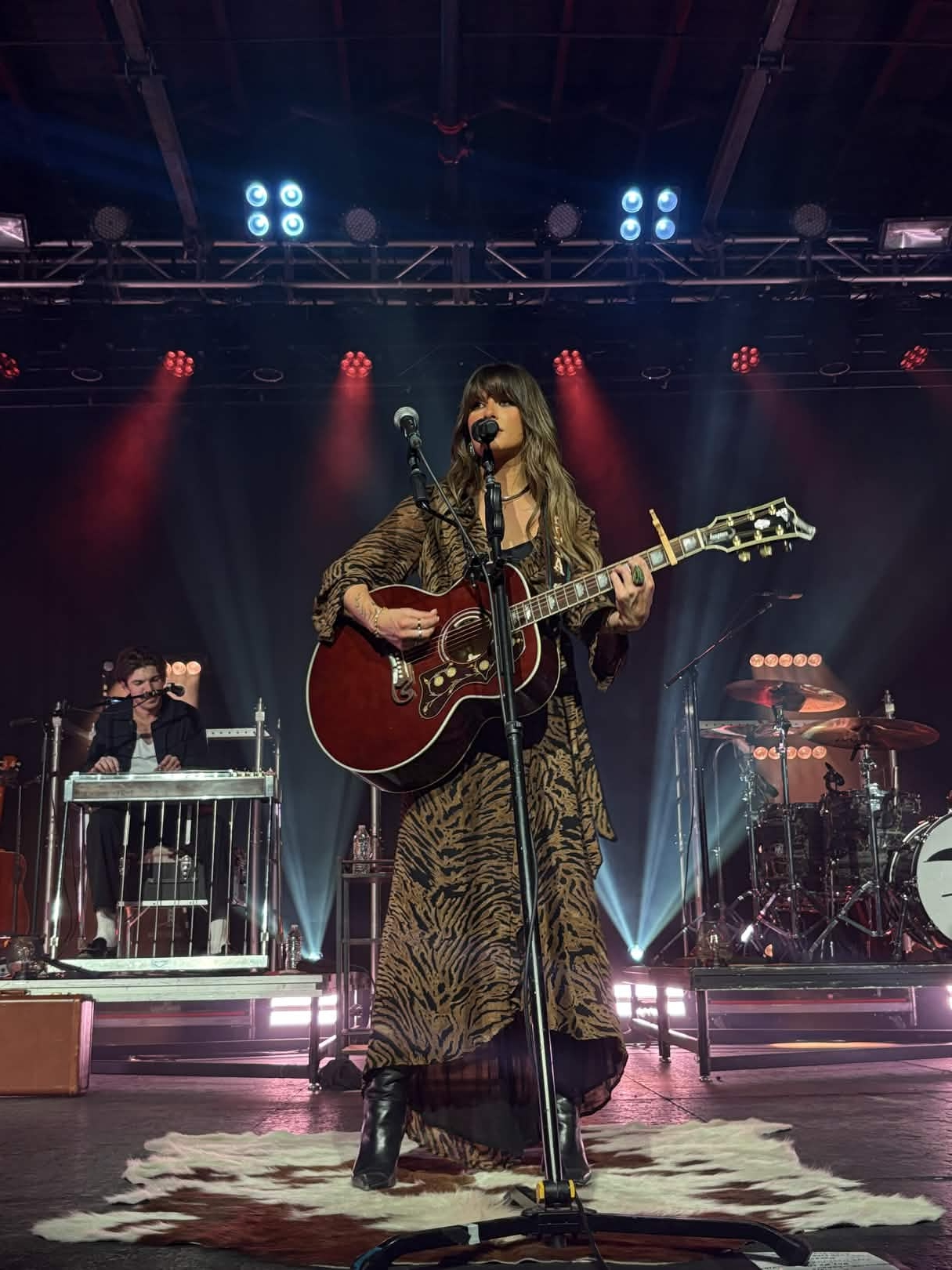
- Langley performing in 2025
- Studio albums: 2
- EPs: 1
- Singles: 8
- Promotional singles: 13
- Music videos: 5

American musician Ella Langley has released two studio albums, one extended play, and eight singles, counting collaborations. In addition, she has charted a number of non-single tracks.

In 2021, Langley signed her first publishing deal with Sony Music Publishing Nashville. Also in 2021, she released "If You Have To" after previewing the single on TikTok. On October 28, 2022, Langley released "Country Boy's Dream Girl" as the lead single for her first extended-play. In February 2023, she signed a record deal with Sony Music Nashville and Columbia Records. She collaborated with Koe Wetzel on "That's Why We Fight", released on April 21, 2023. Her debut EP, Excuse the Mess, came out on May 19, 2023.

Langley's full-length debut studio album, Hungover, was released on August 2, 2024. It debuted at No. 77 on the Billboard 200 and No. 11 on the Billboard Top Country Albums chart. After the release of the deluxe edition, Still Hungover, on November 1, 2024, the album re-entered the Billboard 200 at No. 49. Among several promotional singles, "You Look Like You Love Me", featuring Riley Green, gained significant traction after going viral on TikTok. It became her first entry on the Billboard Hot 100, debuting at number 53. Released to country radio on August 5, 2024, the song peaked at No. 30 on the Billboard Country Airplay, ultimately earning Platinum certification and going to No. 1—making her the only woman in 2024 to achieve this milestone. The second single from the deluxe album, "Weren't for the Wind", was released to country radio on January 2, 2025. It became her highest-charting single on the Hot 100 chart, peaking at No. 18 and her second country radio No. 1. Her second duet with Riley Green "Don't Mind If I Do" was her third country radio number-one song. She also collaborated with American rapper BigXthaPlug on his country rap song "Hell at Night".

Prior to the release of Dandelion, she released "Never Met Anyone Like You", a collaboration with Hardy in June, and "Choosin' Texas", co-written and co-produced with Miranda Lambert. "Choosin' Texas" went viral on TikTok and debuted at No. 39 on the Billboard Hot 100, her highest debut at the time. The song would go on to become the first by a female artist to reach number one on the Hot 100, Hot Country Songs, and Country Airplay charts all at once. It has spent 28 non-consecutive weeks on top of the Billboard Hot 100, the longest reign in the chart's history. On January 27, 2026, Langley formally announced her second album, Dandelion, which released on April 10, 2026. The album's title track, "Be Her", and "Loving Life Again" were released in promotion for the record. Dandelion debuted at number one on the US Billboard 200, making it Langley's first number-one album and the largest streaming debut for an album of new country material by a female country primary artist. The second single "Be Her" peaked at No. 2 on the Billboard Hot 100, being blocked from the top by her own "Choosin' Texas", making her the first female country primary artist in history to occupy the top 2 simultaneously.

== Studio albums ==
List of studio albums, with selected details
| Title | Album details | Peak chart positions | | | | | | | | Certifications |
| Title | Album details | US | US Country | AUS | CAN | IRE | NOR | NZ | UK | Certifications |
|---|---|---|---|---|---|---|---|---|---|---|
| Hungover | Release date: August 2, 2024; Label: Sawgod, Columbia; Format: CD, LP, digital download, streaming | 15 | 4 | 23 | 11 | — | — | — | — | RIAA: Platinum; BPI: Silver; RMNZ: Gold |
| Dandelion | Released: April 10, 2026; Label: Sawgod, Columbia; Format: CD, LP, digital download, streaming | 1 | 1 | 3 | 1 | 13 | 9 | 3 | 7 | RIAA: 2× Platinum; BPI: Silver; IFPI NOR: Gold; MC: Gold; RMNZ: Platinum |

== Extended plays ==
List of extended plays, with selected details and chart positions
| Title | EP details | Peak chart positions |
| Title | EP details | US Country |
|---|---|---|
| Excuse the Mess | Released: May 19, 2023; Label: Sawgod, Columbia; Format: Digital download, streaming | 39 |
"—" denotes a recording that did not chart or was not released in that territory.

== Singles ==
=== As lead artist ===
List of singles, with selected peak chart positions shown
| Title | Year | Peak chart positions | | | | | | | | | | Certifications | Album |
| Title | Year | US | US Country Songs | US Country Airplay | AUS | CAN | CAN Country | IRE | NZ | UK | WW | Certifications | Album |
|---|---|---|---|---|---|---|---|---|---|---|---|---|---|
| "You Look Like You Love Me" (featuring Riley Green) | 2024 | 30 | 7 | 1 | 67 | 31 | 1 | 66 | 19 | 59 | 89 | RIAA: 4× Platinum; ARIA: 2× Platinum; BPI: Gold; MC: 3× Platinum; RMNZ: 2× Platinum | Hungover |
| "Weren't for the Wind" (Note: "Weren't for the Wind" appears exclusively on the deluxe edition of Hungover, titled Still Hungover.) | 2025 | 18 | 4 | 2 | 32 | 31 | 1 | 48 | — (Note: "Weren't for the Wind" did not enter the NZ Top 40 Singles Chart, but peaked at number 11 on the NZ Hot 40 Singles Chart.) | 78 | 104 | RIAA: 3× Platinum; ARIA: Gold; BPI: Silver; MC: Platinum; RMNZ: Platinum | Hungover |
| "Choosin' Texas" | 2025 | 1 | 1 | 1 | 1 | 1 | 1 | 1 | 1 | 1 | 2 | RIAA: 7× Platinum; ARIA: 4× Platinum; BPI: Platinum; MC: 7× Platinum; RMNZ: 3× Platinum | Dandelion |
| "Be Her" | 2026 | 2 | 2 | 1 | 28 | 6 | 1 | 33 | 19 | 28 | 25 | RIAA: 3× Platinum; ARIA: Gold; BPI: Silver; RMNZ: Platinum | Dandelion |
| "I Can't Love You Anymore" (with Morgan Wallen) (Note: "I Can't Love You Anymore" appears exclusively on the reissue of Dandelion.) | 2026 | 4 | 3 | 1 | 48 | 12 | 1 | 57 | — (Note: "I Can't Love You Anymore" did not enter the NZ Top 40 Singles Chart, but peaked at number 5 on the NZ Hot 40 Singles Chart.) | 68 | 30 | RIAA: Platinum | Dandelion |
| "Loving Life Again" | 2026 | 16 | 5 | 1 | 69 | 22 | 1 | — | — | — | 80 | RIAA: Platinum | Dandelion |
"—" denotes a recording that did not chart or was not released in that territory.

=== As featured artist ===
List of featured singles, with selected chart positions
| Title | Year | Peak chart positions | | | | | Certifications | Album |
| Title | Year | US | US Country | US Country Airplay | CAN | CAN Country | Certifications | Album |
|---|---|---|---|---|---|---|---|---|
| "Strangers" (Kameron Marlowe with Ella Langley) | 2024 | — | 43 | 58 | — | — | RIAA: Gold | Keepin' the Lights On |
| "Don't Mind If I Do" (Riley Green featuring Ella Langley) | 2025 | 23 | 5 | 1 | 30 | 1 | RIAA: 2× Platinum; RMNZ: Gold | Don't Mind If I Do |
| "Hell at Night" (BigXthaPlug featuring Ella Langley) | 2025 | 26 | 8 | — | 44 | — | RIAA: Platinum; RMNZ: Gold | I Hope You're Happy |
| "Jaded" (Koe Wetzel with Ella Langley) | 2026 | 11 | 4 | 2 | 24 | 1 | | TBA |
"—" denotes a recording that did not chart or was not released in that territory.

=== Promotional singles ===
List of promotional singles, with selected peak chart positions shown
| Title | Year | Peak chart positions | | | | | | | Certifications | Album |
| Title | Year | US | US Country | US Country Airplay | CAN | CAN Country | NZ Hot | WW | Certifications | Album |
|---|---|---|---|---|---|---|---|---|---|---|
| "If You Have To" | 2021 | — | — | — | — | — | — | — | | Non-album singles |
| "Damn You" | 2022 | — | — | — | — | — | — | — | | Non-album singles |
| "Hey Ma I Made It" | 2022 | — | — | — | — | — | — | — | | Non-album singles |
| "Country Boy's Dream Girl" | 2022 | — | — | — | — | — | — | — | RIAA: Platinum; MC: Gold | Excuse the Mess |
| "That's Why We Fight" (with Koe Wetzel) | 2023 | — | — | — | — | — | — | — | RIAA: Platinum | Excuse the Mess |
| "Paint the Town Blue" | 2024 | — | — | — | — | — | — | — | RIAA: Gold | Hungover |
| "Nicotine" | 2024 | — | — | — | — | — | — | — | | Hungover |
| "Hungover" | 2024 | — | — | — | — | — | — | — | MC: Gold | Hungover |
| "Never Met Anyone Like You" (featuring Hardy) | 2025 | — (Note: "Never Met Anyone Like You" did not enter the Billboard Hot 100, but peaked at number 4 on the Bubbling Under Hot 100.) | 39 | — | 87 | — | 30 | — | RIAA: Gold | Non-album singles |
| "Wish I Didn't Know Now" | 2025 | — | 45 | — | — | — | — | — | | Non-album singles |
| "Winter Wonderland" (with Luke Bryan) | 2025 | — | 47 | 41 | — | 50 | — | — | | Luke Bryan Christmas |
| "Dandelion" | 2026 | 27 | 7 | — | 37 | 31 | 9 | 103 | RIAA: Platinum | Dandelion |
"—" denotes a recording that did not chart or was not released in that territory.

== Other charted and certified songs ==
List of songs, with selected peak chart positions shown
| Title | Year | Peak chart positions | | | | | | | Certifications | Album |
| Title | Year | US | US Country | AUS | CAN | NZ Hot | UK | WW | Certifications | Album |
|---|---|---|---|---|---|---|---|---|---|---|
| "Excuse the Mess" | 2023 | — | — | — | — | — | — | — | RIAA: Gold | Excuse the Mess |
| "Girl You're Taking Home" | 2024 | 92 | 28 | — | — | 35 | — | — | RIAA: Platinum | Still Hungover |
| "We Know Us" | 2026 | 54 | 16 | — | 58 | 8 | — | — | | Dandelion |
| "Low Lights" | 2026 | 62 | 21 | — | 73 | — | — | — | | Dandelion |
| "You & Me Time" | 2026 | 55 | 17 | — | 62 | — | — | — | | Dandelion |
| "Bottom of Your Boots" | 2026 | 20 | 4 | 54 | 24 | 2 | 77 | 71 | RIAA: Gold | Dandelion |
| "Speaking Terms" | 2026 | 63 | 22 | — | 82 | — | — | — | | Dandelion |
| "I Gotta Quit" | 2026 | 80 | 31 | — | 99 | — | — | — | | Dandelion |
| "It Wasn't God Who Made Honky Tonk Angels" | 2026 | 83 | 32 | — | — | — | — | — | | Dandelion |
| "Last Call for Us" | 2026 | 76 | 29 | — | 100 | — | — | — | | Dandelion |
| "Broken" | 2026 | 53 | 15 | — | 68 | 11 | — | — | | Dandelion |
| "Somethin' Simple" | 2026 | 75 | 28 | — | 95 | — | — | — | | Dandelion |
| "Butterfly Season" (featuring Miranda Lambert) | 2026 | 71 | 26 | — | 86 | — | — | — | | Dandelion |
| "Most Good Things Do (Acoustic)" | 2026 | — (Note: "Most Good Things Do (Acoustic)" did not enter the Billboard Hot 100, but peaked at number 1 on the Bubbling Under Hot 100.) | 38 | — | — | — | — | — | | Dandelion |
| "Here Then We're Gone" | 2026 | — | — | — | — | 6 | — | — | | The Hunger Games: Sunrise on the Reaping (The Album) |
"—" denotes a recording that did not chart or was not released in that territory.

== Music videos ==
| Year | Video | Director |
|---|---|---|
| 2023 | "That's Why We Fight" (with Koe Wetzel) | Wales Toney |
| 2024 | "You Look Like You Love Me" (featuring Riley Green) | Wales Toney, John Park, Ella Langley |
| 2025 | "Weren't for the Wind" | Toney and Langley |
| 2026 | "Be Her" | Toney and Langley |
| 2026 | "Choosin' Texas" | Langley, Toney, and Caylee Robillard |
