= List of Billboard Digital Song Sales number ones of 2026 =

2026 highest-selling digital singles in the United States

The Billboard Digital Song Sales chart is a chart that ranks the most downloaded songs in the United States. Its data is compiled by Nielsen SoundScan based on each song's weekly digital sales, which combines sales of different versions of a song by an act for a summarized figure. This is a list of songs that reached number one on the chart in 2026.

== Chart history ==
Issue date	Song	Artist(s)	Weekly sales	Ref(s)
January 3	"Turn the Lights Off"	Kato featuring Jon	—N/a	
January 10	"Choosin' Texas"	Ella Langley	5,000 (Note: The best overall selling song of the week was "The Fate of Ophelia" by Taylor Swift with 30,000 physical and digital sales combined.)	
January 17	"The Fate of Ophelia"	Taylor Swift	7,000 (Note: The song had overall 11,000 digital and physical sales combined.)	
January 24	"I Just Might"	Bruno Mars	13,000	
January 31	"I Just Might"	Bruno Mars	9,000	
February 7	"Streets of Minneapolis"	Bruce Springsteen	16,000	
February 14	"Streets of Minneapolis"	Bruce Springsteen	—N/a	
February 21	"'Til You Can't"	Kid Rock	51,000	
February 28	"Opalite"	Taylor Swift	24,000 (Note: The song had overall 168,000 physical and digital sales combined.)	
March 7	"Choosin' Texas"	Ella Langley	6,000	
March 14	"Choosin' Texas"	Ella Langley	—N/a (Note: The best overall selling song of the week was "I Just Might" by Bruno Mars with 6,000 physical and digital sales combined.)	
March 21	"Choosin' Texas"	Ella Langley	6,000	
March 28	"Golden"	Huntrix	6,000	
April 4	"Swim"	BTS	94,500 (Note: The song had overall 154,000 digital and physical sales combined.)	
April 11	"Swim"	BTS	67,000	
April 18	"Swim"	BTS	24,000	
April 25	"Swim"	BTS	11,000	
May 2	"Drop Dead"	Olivia Rodrigo	31,000 (Note: The song had overall 45,000 digital and physical sales combined.)	
May 9	"I Can't Love You Anymore"	Ella Langley and Morgan Wallen	10,000	
May 16	"Choosin' Texas"	Ella Langley	8,000	
May 23	"Choosin' Texas"	Ella Langley	7,000	
May 30	"Choosin' Texas"	Ella Langley	9,000	
June 6	"Choosin' Texas"	Ella Langley	—N/a	
June 13	"Hate That I Made You Love Me"	Ariana Grande	55,000 (Note: The song had overall 70,000 digital and physical sales combined.)	
June 20	"I Knew It, I Knew You"	Taylor Swift	70,000 (Note: The song had overall 87,000 digital and physical sales combined.)	
June 27	"Come Over"	BTS	—N/a (Note: The best overall selling song of the week was "I Knew It, I Knew You" by Taylor Swift with 183,000 physical and digital sales combined.)	
July 4	"Choosin' Texas"	Ella Langley	8,000 (Note: The best overall selling song of the week was "I Knew It, I Knew You" by Taylor Swift with 41,000 physical and digital sales combined.)	
July 11	"Choosin' Texas"	Ella Langley	9,000	
July 18	"Choosin' Texas"	Ella Langley	7,000	
July 25	"Choosin' Texas"	Ella Langley	7,000	
August 1	"Normal"	BTS	21,000	
August 8	"Been By Now"	Morgan Wallen	12,000	
August 15	"Choosin' Texas"	Ella Langley	9,000	
August 22	"Choosin' Texas"	Ella Langley	8,000	
August 29	"Choosin' Texas"	Ella Langley	7,000	
September 5	"I Will Always Love You"	Dolly Parton	16,000	
September 12	"9 to 5"	Dolly Parton	10,000	
September 19	"Choosin' Texas"	Ella Langley	6,000	
September 26	"Choosin' Texas"	Ella Langley	6,000	
October 3	"Choosin' Texas"	Ella Langley	9,000	
October 10	"Patient Zero"	Taylor Swift	65,000	
October 17	"Patient Zero"	Taylor Swift	8,000 (Note: The song had overall 142,000 physical and digital sales combined.)	
October 24	"Patient Zero"	Taylor Swift	27,000 (Note: The song had overall 178,000 physical and digital sales combined.)	
October 31	"Lies"	Zach Bryan featuring Lana Del Rey	5,000 (Note: The best overall selling song of the week was "Patient Zero" by Taylor Swift with 30,000 physical and digital sales combined.)	
November 7	"Choosin' Texas"	Ella Langley	3,000	
November 14	"Thriller"	Michael Jackson	4,000	
November 21	"Choosin' Texas"	Ella Langley	4,000	
