= Freddy (soccer fan) =

German social media personality and soccer fan

- Born: Frederik; Hamburg, Germany

Instagram information
- Page: Freddy
- Years active: 2026–present
- Genres: Vlogging; soccer; tourism
- Followers: 124 thousand

X information
- Handle: @freddyLA7
- Display name: Freddy🇩🇪
- Years active: 2026–present
- Followers: 756.7 thousand
- Last updated: November 13, 2026

Frederik, also known by his online handle freddyLA7, or simply Freddy (stylized in all lowercase) is an soccer fan, believed to be German. He gained international publicity following his trip to the United States and Canada during the 2026 FIFA World Cup, which both countries partially hosted. Described as "America's Favorite Everymensch", (Note: A play on the German term Übermensch (lit. "superman", or "beyond-man")) Freddy's prominence has occurred in the context of a larger genre of pro-American content posted by Europeans visiting the country for the World Cup.

A soccer fan from Hamburg in his twenties who has attempted to conceal his identity, he uses a profile picture of Cristiano Ronaldo online. He arrived in the US in early June before the tournament began, but already began amassing a large degree of prominence due to his tour of the Southern United States, where his reactions to Southeastern Conference (SEC) culture, various American chains such as Buc-ee's and Waffle House, and his enjoyment of country singer Ella Langley, quickly aroused positive reactions from ordinary Americans, celebrities, politicians and brands. His high-profile tour throughout America and Canada has seen him meet and be reached out to by celebrities such as Langley, J. J. Watt, Jessica Meir, Gordon Ramsay, and Nick Adams. Over the course of his visit, he visited Niagara Falls, FaceTimed members of the International Space Station and secured a flight from American Airlines after a "bidding war" between several aviation companies when his flight from Dallas to Toronto was canceled due to poor weather. He ended his trip with a tour of Washington, D.C., visiting the White House, before returning to Hamburg on July 24.

He has been widely lauded by many Americans of all political orientations for showing positive aspects of the country, amidst a backdrop of political polarization and declining domestic and international opinion of the US, especially during the second Trump presidency. His tour of the United States was seen as inviting a different outlook towards American culture and was compared to the visit of the 19th-century French statesman Alexis de Tocqueville. Despite his popularity, controversy has ensued as his anonymity and red carpet treatment, has lead to widespread doubts over his authenticity, with him facing accusations of being a front for certain individuals, brands, or even the United States itself during his trip; numerous people accused him of being an agent of the CIA. Additionally, he was also scrutinized for allegedly pandering to American right-wingers. Following the unearthing of tweets that demonstrated he had been in America before, Freddy deactivated his account on X, (Note: Though he remained active on TikTok and Instagram) saying that his detractors had ruined his fun. Despite this, he later reactivated his account and completed his documentation of his journey there.

== Background ==
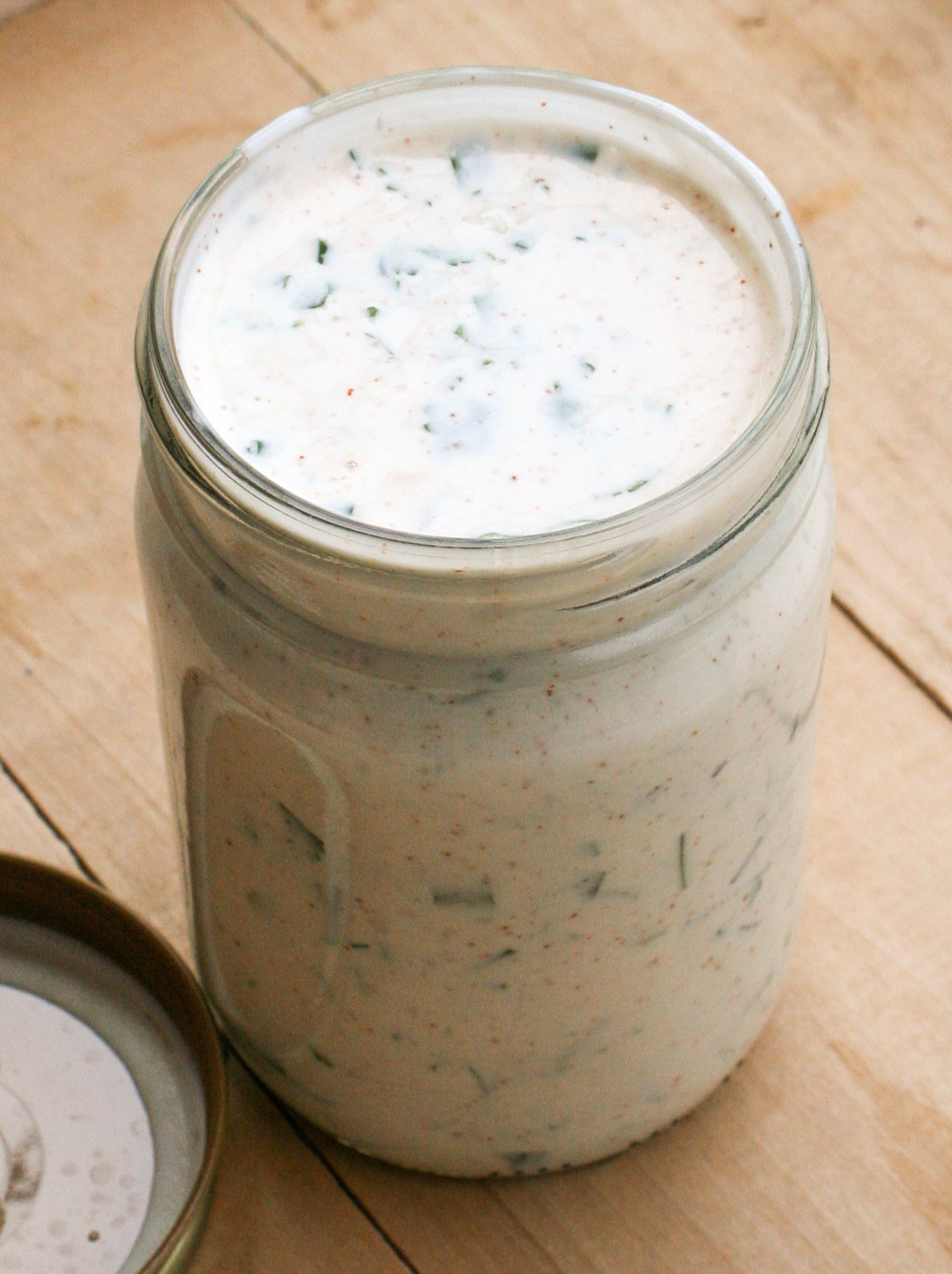
During the 2026 FIFA World Cup, many European visitors posted content online highlighting aspects of American culture, including ranch dressing

The FIFA World Cup is the premier global soccer tournament. The United States, a country where soccer historically did not become as domestically popular as elsewhere in the world, first hosted the tournament in 1994. After failing in 2010 to secure another bid for 2022 due to a Qatari bribery campaign, the country in 2018 launched a joint-bid with Canada and Mexico for the 2026 World Cup that was successful.

The 2026 FIFA World Cup was marred by various controversies, largely directly or popularly attributed to the return of Donald Trump to the American presidency, which saw a wave of controversial domestic and international actions, many of which had a direct or indirect effect on the tournament itself. Compounded with a worsening political climate, this has led to declining international opinion of the US and lowered senses of patriotism within America itself. The lead up to the tournament saw this be displayed frequently, with many Europeans in particular amplifying the supposedly high possibility of mass deportation at games, accusations of FIFA kissing up to Trump, claims of low attendance, and overall critique of certain aspects of this particular tournament as being Americanized (such as the inclusion of a halftime show at the final). Despite this, a wave of Americophilic content from Europeans visiting America appeared online during the tournament and received widespread attention. Some instances included Europeans obsessing over ranch dressing and Spanish player Lamine Yamal loading a grocery store at Walmart. Although these were generally well received, doubts were raised over the authenticity of some of these posts; a Japanese account on X named "Nobunaga" (Note: named after the Sengoku-era warlord Oda Nobunaga) that purported to feature a man acting as a samurai traveling around the world, and had made a video where he allegedly visited an American hibachi restaurant, was found to be an AI account using AI-generated imagery.

=== Freddy ===
Freddy describes himself as a German soccer fan in his twenties from Bergedorf, Hamburg, and is a student at university, studying media management. He has stated that his family is from Denmark, and is a fan of the Danish FC Midtjylland, which is from their hometown. Before the 2026 trip, he had already visited the United States, coming to New York City, Los Angeles and Las Vegas. Old posts on his now-deleted X account show that he did exchange program in Santa Barbara and had attended a few concerts in the country; they also show that his full name is Frederick. Writing for The Atlantic, journalist Will Oremus claimed to have found a LinkedIn profile that may be him, which suggested he may have interned for a German sports-marketing firm. One of his friends accompanying him on his trip is a fan of Hamburger SV. He is traveling with three other people, also unknown, though netizens spotted orders at a Wendy's labeled with "John" and "LA"; as his handle is "freddyLA7", the latter order could just refer to him.

An avid fan of the sport, and with Germany qualifying for the World Cup, he began planning his visit to North America as far back as March and planned to document it on X. Prior to the trip, he was largely unknown, and spent most of his time on X supporting Portuguese soccer player Cristiano Ronaldo and his Saudi club, Al Nassr, while also occasionally making posts about German politics. He started vlogging about the experience before he arrived in the US on June 3, when he posted a photo of his suitcase, containing primarily jerseys. He left Germany on June 4. Following a 24-hour layover in Dublin, where he visited, among other places, Temple Bar and Trinity College, he flew to the United States on June 5, through John F. Kennedy International Airport in New York. He then flew to Atlanta. He detailed his trip in a road-tripesque manner. He traveled with two other companions; in photos posted online, he covers his face with a photo of Cristiano Ronaldo (also used as his profile picture), and his two companions' with emojis.

== North American trip ==
=== American South ===
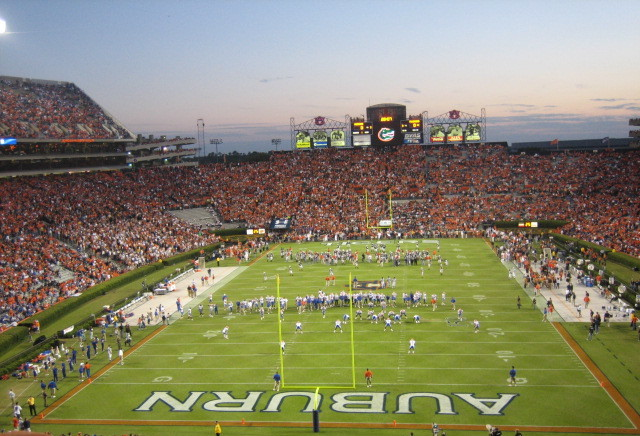
Jordan–Hare Stadium, where Freddy visited to attend a friendly between Argentina and Iceland on June 11, and was taken aback by SEC culture.

Arriving seven days before the opening ceremony, he began a tour of the American South, working his way from Atlanta to Houston. In Georgia, he came across filming locations for Stranger Things, and the Martin Luther King Jr. National Historical Park in Atlanta. Highlighting the World Cup fever present in the city (despite the games not starting until June 12), he approved of the city's nature saying that "it feels like you're in a forest the whole time", but expressed disapproval of the city's metro, the MARTA rail, describing it as a "GTA lobby". He discovered the Bavarian-themed city of Helen in the state's north, and tubed down the Chattahoochee River. He then visited Brasstown Bald, where he got stuck in a rainstorm with shoes still soaked from the tubing. By June 5, he had already amassed 11 thousand followers.

Throughout his visit in the South, he visited multiple food and retail chains. He visited a Taco Bell on June 7, which he described as the "holy land" and one of the reasons he wanted to visit the US, dined at Waffle House in Georgia on June 8, which he gave a 10/10, and received extensive attention for a June 10 Buc-ee's post, which he captioned "DUDE LMAO THIS IS A GAS STATION". He also visited Walmart and Wendy's, where he was overwhelmed by the selection of items. He entered Tennessee on June 8, visiting Chattanooga. On the same day, he watched the NBA Finals while eating a "Quesadilla Explosion Salad" at Chili's. After a brief detour into Florida, during which he stopped at a Freddy's and complimented the houses in Gainesville, he entered Alabama. While driving in Alabama, he discovered the Alabama-born country singer Ella Langley on radio on June 10, later describing her as the "soundtrack" of his trip. At a June 9 Argentina–Iceland friendly in Auburn, Alabama, a local hotel waitress opted to drive him and his companions to the game, instead of having them wait in the rain for an Uber. His reaction to the friendly at Auburn University's Jordan–Hare Stadium, which demonstrated much of Southeastern Conference (SEC) culture (including playing Swag Surfin, pyrotechnics, and the release of a live eagle around the stadium, an Auburn Tigers tradition), was widely reported on, with him declaring that the atmosphere was something "the European mind can't comprehend".

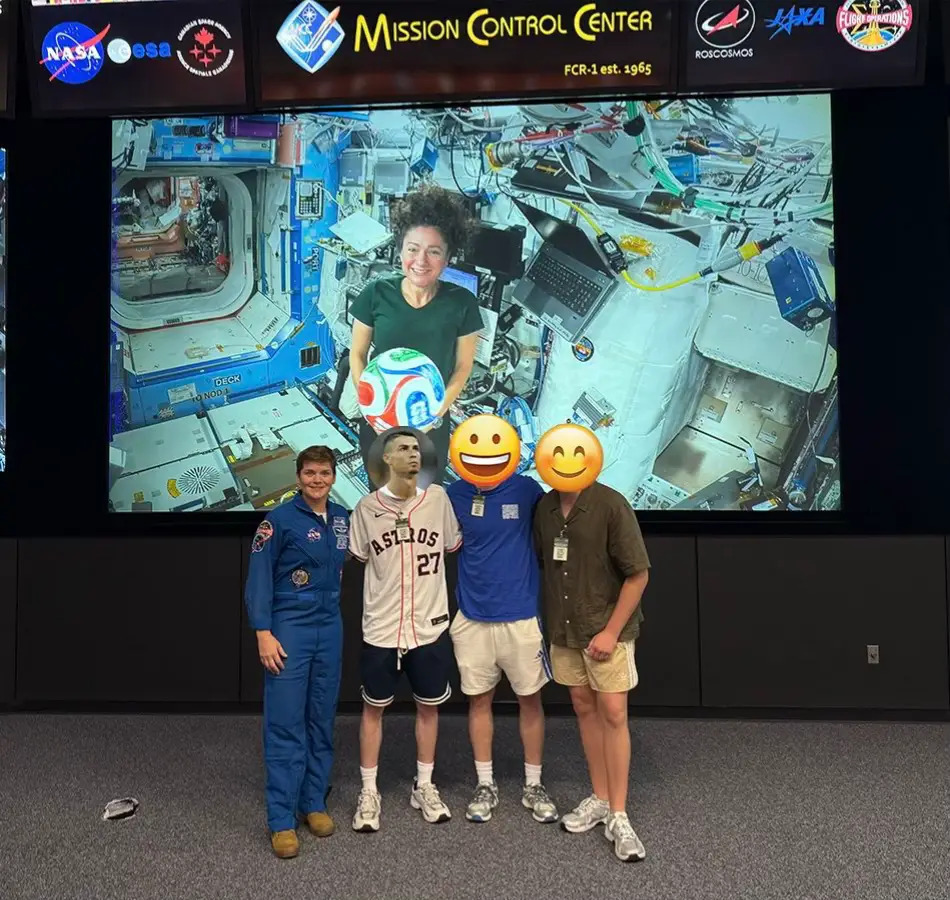
With Jessica Meir (top) and Anne McClain (left) at Johnson Space Center, June 16.

He subsequentially went to Mississippi and then Louisiana, where the state welcome sign featured an additional hand-painted "WELCOME FREDDY", and where on June 11, a local radio station played Ella Langley on the radio specifically for him at his request and gave him a shoutout as he drove throughout the state. Jeff Landry, Louisiana's governor, welcomed Freddy to the state. At a Bass Pro Shops, he saw a shooting range and noticed that they were selling rifles. After watching the opening game of the World Cup while eating Buffalo Wild Wings, he arrived in New Orleans on June 12, where he ate another Waffle House via take-out after the main dining area had closed, prompting warnings from Americans, who associate closed Waffle Houses with dangerous neighborhoods due to the fact that the chain is typically open 24 hours a day. At the city, he received a tour of the New Orleans Saints' and New Orleans Pelicans' facilities, meeting the Saints quarterback Tyler Shough; he also visited Bourbon Street. In Baton Rouge, he visited Louisiana State University and its Tiger Stadium. Afterwards, he went into Louisiana's bayous to search for alligators.

Freddy arrived in Texas on June 13, playing Ella Langley's Choosin' Texas as he and his friends entered. On the same day, he went to Houston to see his first World Cup match, Germany vs Curaçao; the Germans won 7-1. Retired NFL player J. J. Watt paid for an accommodation for Freddy and his companions on June 14 at The Post Oak, a luxury hotel in the city, accompanied with snacks and Houston-themed merchandise, including a World Cup ball and a Watts-signed Texans jersey, plus tequila and a massive fruit bowl. The following day, he received a surprise delivery from PopUp Bagels, which Watts is an investor in. Afterwards, he ate barbeque with the Houston Police Department, and met the city's mayor, John Whitmire, at an MLB game between the Houston Astros and Detroit Tigers. He visited Galveston, as well as NASA's Johnson Space Center near the city, where he met with astronauts such as Anne McClain, entered the Orion capsule that had recently flown around the Moon as part of Artemis II and sat on its commander's seat, connected to the International Space Station via FaceTime and met other astronauts such as Jessica Meir. On June 17. he attended the match between Portugal and the DRC, before leaving for Oklahoma. By June 15, he had amassed over 440 thousand followers on X.

With Ella Langley in Oklahoma City, June 18. Freddy's interest in her music received extensive coverage and culminated in her offering free tickets to her concert.

On June 18, at Oklahoma City, he attended an Ella Langley concert with free tickets on her invitation, what he described as being his "dream come true". He filmed her singing Choosin' Texas, before taking a photo with Langley and his traveling companions, docked out with cowboy boots, blue jeans and "Ella's Fellas" shirts; Langley responded positively to the interaction on social media. She also made sure his hotel room was loaded with gifts. On June 19, Nick Adams, the Special Presidential Envoy for American, Tourism, Exceptionalism and Values, confirmed to Fox News that he had been invited to the White House, describing him as "one of hundreds of thousands of visitors coming to the USA and experiencing the incredible hospitality and generosity of the American people". Adams stated that he got the idea to reach out to him after Freddy expressed his love for Langley's music, who Adams was also a fan of. Adams speaks German fluently, and has family that does as well. Donald Trump's presence at a meeting had not been confirmed. Freddy and his group initially declined a visit, stating although they would have liked to come, they did not want to get involved in politics.

=== Canada and the Northeastern US ===
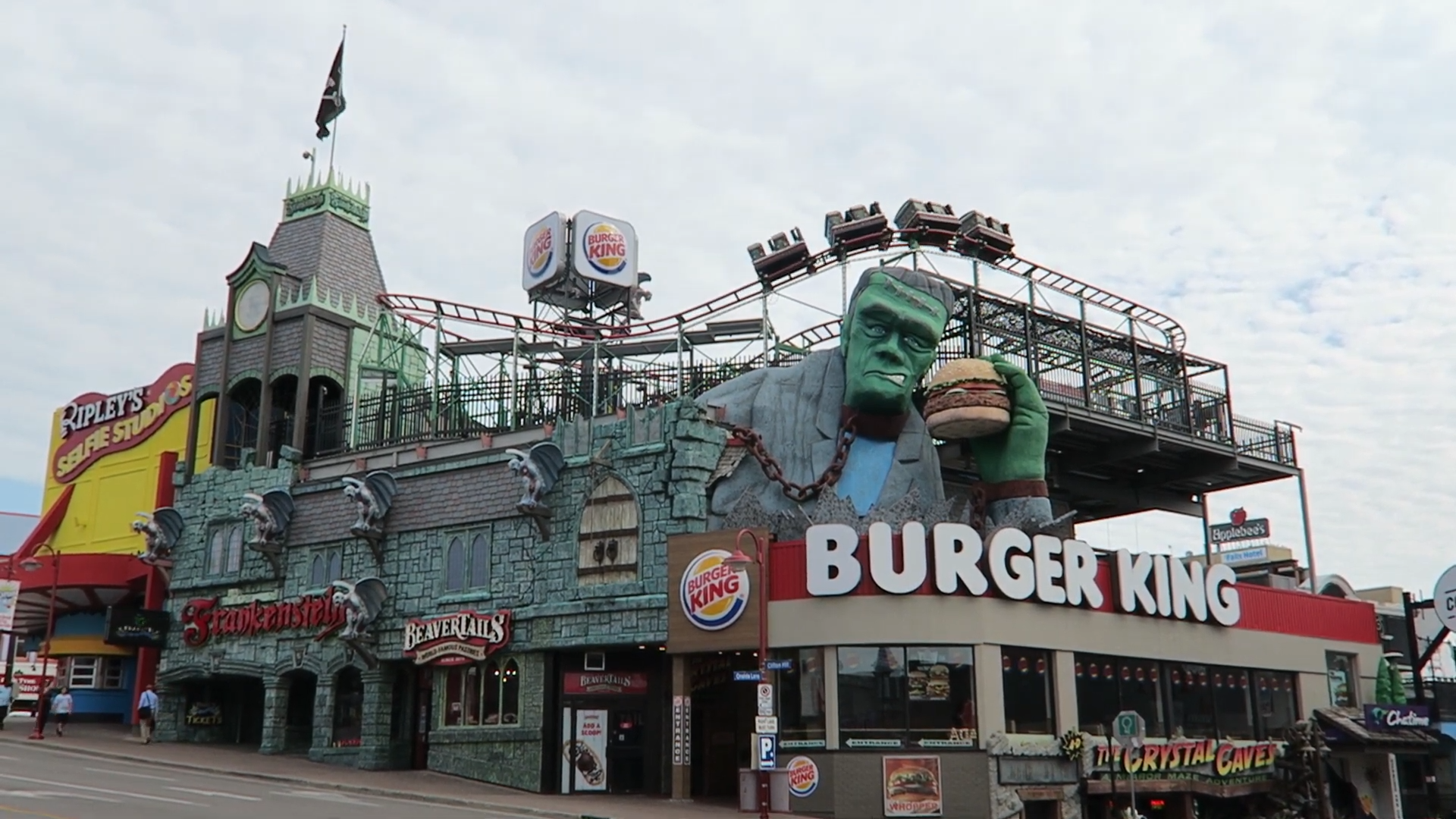
While in Niagara Falls, Ontario, Freddy came across the Frank' N Coaster (seen here in 2022), a roller coaster atop a Burger King.

After his stay in Texas, Freddy had plans to visit Toronto on June 21, when Germany was scheduled to play against Ivory Coast. His connecting flight from Dallas to Toronto was canceled due to poor weather the day prior. With him about to miss the game, fans began crowdsourcing for alternative flights. Several aviation companies reached out to him in what was described as a "bidding war"; John Owens, the CEO of a Kansas-based aircraft provider, attempted to charter a private flight specifically for him that would likely have costed tens of thousands of dollars normally, while Air Canada an Spencer Cox, Governor of Utah, also attempted to reach out to Freddy via X. Eventually, American Airlines provided him a flight to Buffalo, New York after intervention from J. J. Watt. Germany defeated the Ivorians 2–1.

While in Ontario, he ate at a Denny's and visited the banks of Lake Ontario, before going to see Niagara Falls, where he expressed shock over its size, stating "the whole city is like one giant amusement park", and noting the Frank'n Coaster, a rooftop roller coaster above a Burger King restaurant. After the game in Toronto, he embarked upon a road trip to Boston, where Germany was set to play against Paraguay on June 29. He posted the Apple Maps route of his journey, which would have taken him throughout Southern Ontario, Michigan, Ohio, Pennsylvania, New York, Connecticut, and then Massachusetts, opting to take a longer route due to the week long gap between the two games. One June 23, a member of his group was forced to travel home for work-related reasons; Freddy states that he would return on July 10. On June 24, Freddy was in Ohio, being in Elmore and Berlin, the latter of which, founded by a Prussian native of Berlin in 1816, was described as one of his favorite places on the journey. While in Berlin, he came across a group of Amish people in their traditional horse-drawn buggies.

Arriving in Boston, he attended the 2026 Slammiversary on June 28. On June 29, Paraguay defeated Germany via penalty shoot-out. Despite the loss, the German fan vowed to continue his visit, as his flight back to Germany is on July 23; he subsequentially reached out to his followers for things to do in the meantime. By that day, his follower count eclipsed 750 thousand, and by the end of it, his post asking for requests had received more than 6 thousand replies. While in Boston, he stayed in a hotel paid for by Gordon Ramsay. From June 30 onwards, he shifted to documenting his trip on Instagram, after he deactivated his X account. On July 2, Adams once again stated that Freddy would be coming to Washington, D.C., despite his earlier rejection; reports indicate that it may come on July 16, following the conclusion of the World Cup. He then traveled from Boston back to Dallas via road.

=== Remainder of trip ===
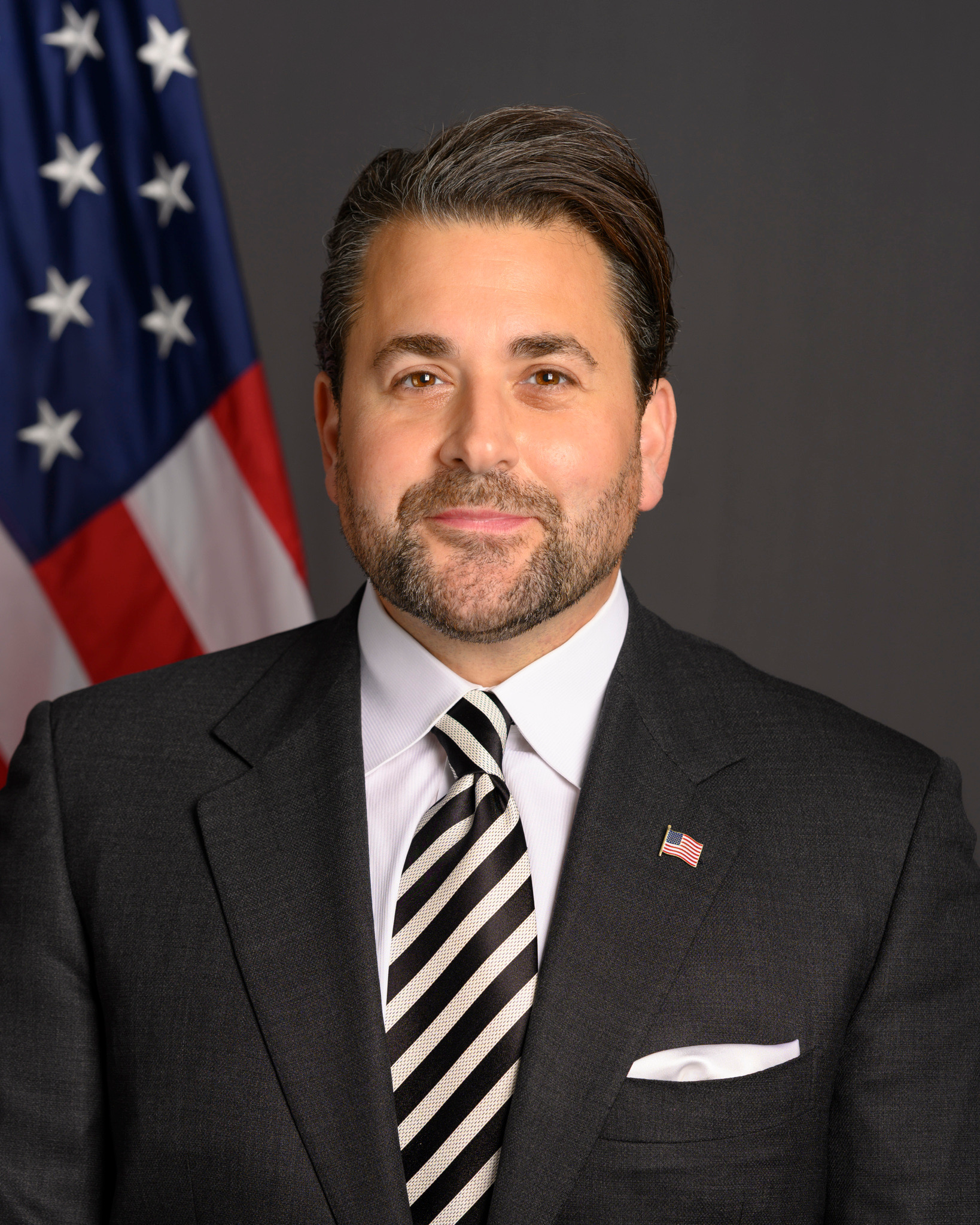
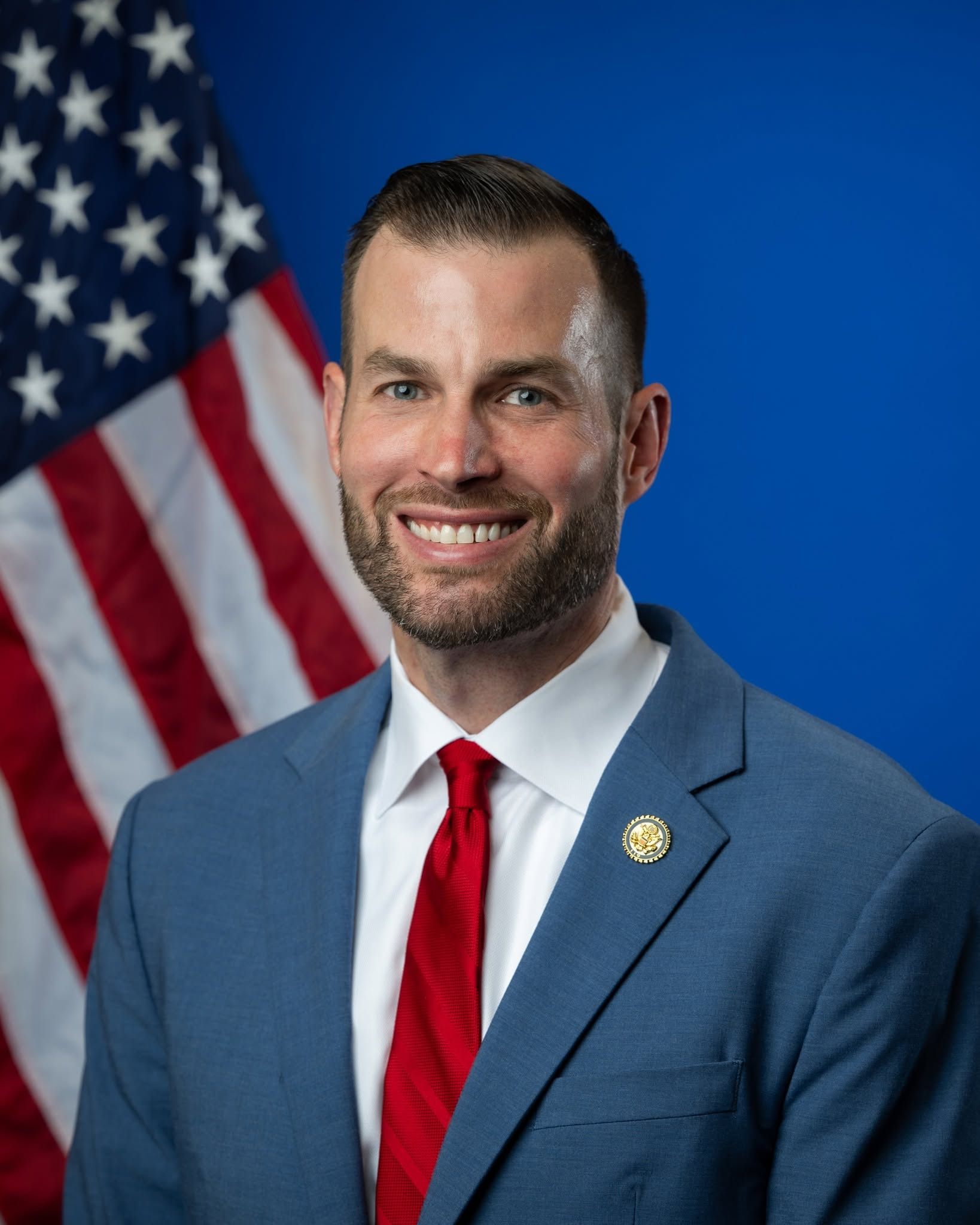
Freddy was given a tour of DC by Nick Adams and Georgia representative Clay Fuller, pictured respectively

Early July saw Freddy celebrate Independence Day, and visit Tennessee and North Carolina, where he toured the Smoky Mountains; these would be posted on his X account after its reactivation on July 13. One of these posts, where he remarked on the ease of gun ownership in the US while in Tennessee engendered controversy as part of the debate on guns in the country. On July 12, he went to a Wendy's in Augusta, Georgia, before going to McCormick County, South Carolina, and then finally visiting the state's Clemson University to observe the school's baseball and football fields. From there, they toured the Appalachians, visiting Cherokee, North Carolina, before following the Ocoee River into Eastern Tennessee, stopping by Lake Ocoee and Parksville Lake in Polk County. He was invited by the locals to watch Spain defeat France as part of the World Cup semifinals, before going target shooting. On July 16, he entered Nashville, Tennessee, visiting the Grand Ole Opry (where he wore the boots Langley had given him), the Country Music Hall of Fame and Museum, and Broadway. On July 17, he attended a Major League Soccer game at Nashville's Geodis Park between Nashville and Atlanta; although they originally had regular seats, one of the owners of Nashville SC invited him to his personal suite to watch the game. On July 18, he left for Kentucky.

On July 21, he arrived at Washington, D.C. There, he was given a tour of the nation's capital, including private tours of the Capitol, Washington Monument, and the White House's West Wing. Adams extensively accompanied him and documented the trip on social media, including rides in a "hulking, American-made black SUV," and a feast for Freddy that included tomahawk steak, chicken wings, onion rings, domestic beer and "MAHA-approved beef tallow fries." Georgia representative Clay Fuller gave Freddy his tour of the Capitol; Fuller, who was from Helen, began tracking Freddy on social media after he noticed his post from there. His monuments tour was organized by the Department of the Interior. Afterwards, Freddy flew home on July 23.

=== Aftermath ===
On July 29, Freddy announced that he was planning on another US trip in the autumn of 2026. The trip is supposed to focus on College football, being inspired by some of his visits during his World Cup trip. Other hinted at attractions include an Oktoberfest in Helen, Georgia, the Breeders' Cup at Keeneland, Kentucky, and the Texas State Fair in Dallas. Other sports and "unique American events" will also be included.

From September 10th until November 8th Freddy and his two friends went on a "College Football" tour, visiting numerous colleges and football games along the way. During the trip he revealed his identity and started a YouTube channel.

== Reaction and doubts over identity ==
=== Positive, pro-American reactions ===
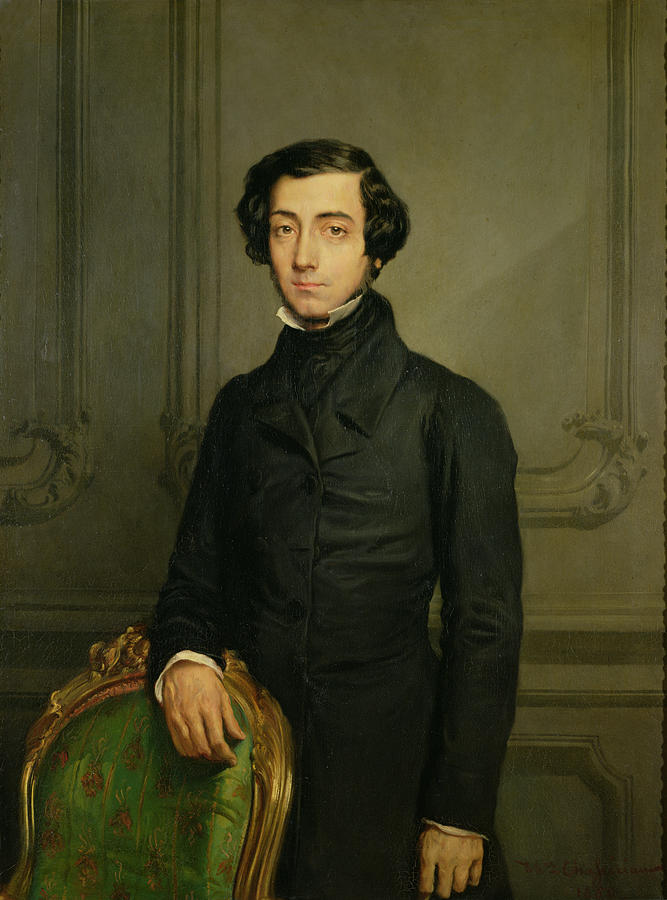
Freddy was compared to by some media outlets to Alexis de Tocqueville, the 19th century French statesman who also embarked upon a visit of America in the 1830s

Freddy's trip throughout the United States and Canada drew extensive popular, celebrity, media and political coverage. His visit to the South in particular turned out positive reactions from many Southerners, including Auburn University, rapper Sexyy Red, and Kay Ivey, the Governor of Alabama. Gwen Howerton of the Texas news website Chron stated that she helped her retain love for the South in a climate that otherwise sometimes does not make her welcome. ESPN host Pat McAfee held him up as a symbol of American success throughout the World Cup, while Fox Sports gave him a shoutout while broadcasting. Derek Stevens, the owner of several hotels in Las Vegas, invited Freddy to stay at the Circa Resort & Casino. Although he had not received a response from Stevens, he was taken aback by the popularity of his tweet, which became his most engaged with ever. Other brands such as Ford Motors and Hilton Hotels, as well as several MLS teams also reached out to him. His posts drew additional positive reactions from the State Department, Tommy Tuberville and Katie Britt, the respective senior and junior Senators from Alabama, Hunter Biden and Sean Duffy, the Secretary of Transportation. The Governor of Florida, Ron DeSantis, invited Freddy to see Florida's beaches while he briefly visited the state, while JD Vance, Vice President, stated that he would like to meet him and that he highlights the cultural exchange that occurs during international events such as the World Cup; he declined to comment on claims that Freddy was going to visit the White House. Mike Lee, the senior Senator from Utah, called for making Freddy a citizen.

David Ubben, writing for The New York Times, compared Freddy to Anthony Bourdain, while several outlets compared Freddy to Alexis de Tocqueville, the 19th century French intellectual who visited and wrote about America in the 1830s. William Lyons of the Knoxville News Sentinel highlighted how both Freddy and de Tocqueville came to an America undergoing intense political polarization under controversial presidencies (in de Tocqueville's case, that of Andrew Jackson) and facing democratic disruption. However, at the community level, society functioned well due to civic engagement, belief in individual life, and community organization, with him repeating de Tocqueville's finding that America functioned not just due to its political structure, but its population as well. Remarking on a comment made by Freddy who stated that some might think he was being overly positive, Lyons wrote that unlike the America of Jackson's time, the America of today is suffering from immense self-doubt and lack of vision, and used him to make a call for greater patriotism in light of the upcoming United States Semiquincentennial. Many ordinary Americans lauded his coverage of their country, and he amassed a large following in large part due to it. Marissa Matozzo of the New York Post wrote that Freddy's trip highlighted that "sometimes the country's biggest attractions aren't famous monuments — they're a Chili's salad, a Buc-ee's brisket sandwich and a gas station so enormous that it leaves European tourists questioning reality. A widely circulated post online stated that "Freddy is legit the best thing that is happening for the World Cup and for the USA PR." Especially early on, many of his detractors, specifically European ones, were chastised by his supporters.

Writing for Slate, journalist Alex Kirshner described Freddy's virality, as well as generally pro-American content on social media from people abroad as more so being for Americans than Europeans, stating that his popularity was the consequence of the former looking for evidence that the United States is a good country amid a politically polarized climate. Danielle Shapiro, writing for The Washington Post, stated "For the better part of a decade, Americans have been instructed by their politics and their social media feeds that their country is something to apologize for, that it is a nation in decline," adding that it does not feel like decline when one can encounter free refills at restaurants, the Interstates, American music, or "patronize a diner chain so reliable that the federal government monitors natural disasters by whether its restaurants are still open." Halina Bennet, writing for Matthew Yglesias's blog Slow Boring, stated that it highlighted "parts of American life that millions of Americans also love but that are often disregarded by those who speak for it — elite influencers such as politicians and public intellectuals", adding that the latter often disparage aspects of American life in a misguided attempt to appear sophisticated.

Freddy himself was taken aback by the level of attention he was received. After receiving the care package from J. J. Watt, he remarked that "This is all so insane... I genuinely don't understand how it got to this point. We're just normal World Cup tourists.😭😭". Watt himself first reached out to Freddy on June 9, and maintained an extensive correspondence with him, tweeting about him after Germany lost to Paraguay on June 29. Freddy is appreciative of the support he's received from many in America, stating "you're making it possible for us to have the most American experience imaginable on this trip," and that "we're getting to see behind the scenes and meet so many amazing people." He listed Texas, Alabama, and Tennessee as his favorite states and declared Fairhope, Alabama as his favorite city, with Taco Bell his favorite food joint.

=== Doubts over identity, controversy and move to Instagram ===
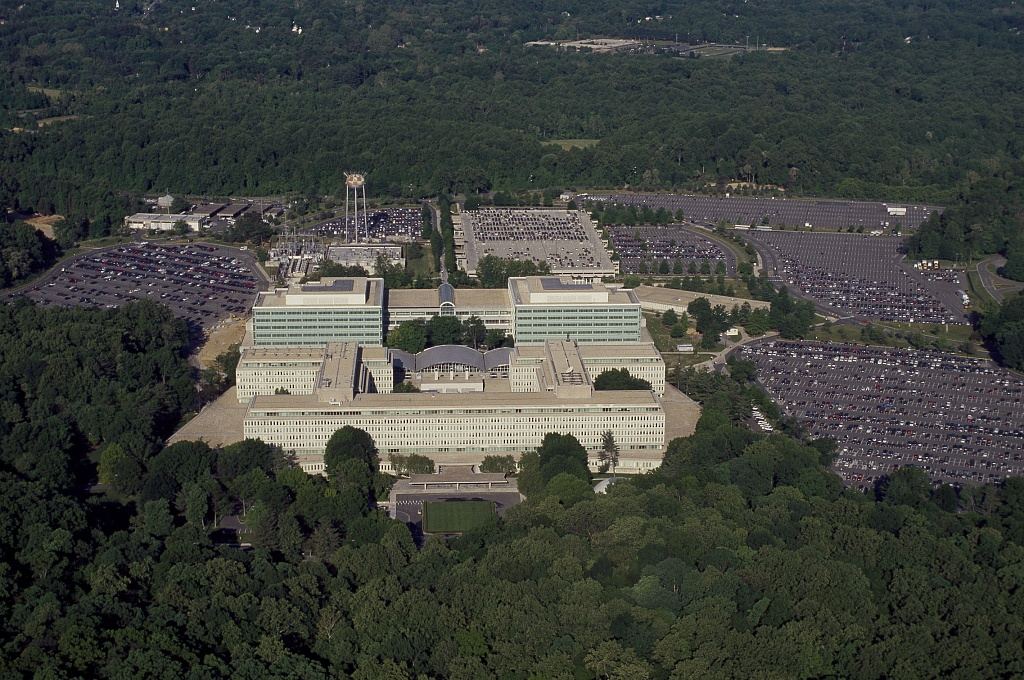
The George Bush Center for Intelligence, the headquarters of the CIA. Detractors of Freddy often labeled him as a front for various individuals or entities, including the United States, and was subject to genuine accusations of being a CIA asset. After Germany lost to Paraguay, some told him to "go back to Langley", the location of the center in Virginia.

Will Oremus of The Atlantic noted that Freddy was good at making viral content, in particular noting that his anonymity helped bolster public interest. However, he noted that this was not able to free himself from controversy, and that fundamentally, something about him felt "too good to be true". From the start of his period of fame, Freddy had drawn criticism. Particularly early on, this often stemmed from the inauthenticity of many other pro-American foreign content creators online during the World Cup. In addition to some, both in Europe, America, and elsewhere not being in the mood for pro-American sentiment, the degree of red carpet treatment he received so swiftly; staying at luxury hotels paid by celebrities such as Watt and Gordon Ramsay, receiving free tickets and a meet-and-greet with Ella Langley, and the amount of high-profile brands, such as Cracker Barrel and Wendy's, reaching out to him, prompted many to question the authenticity of his activity. In this, his anonymity became a liability, with even the authenticity of his identity of his German identity has also been questioned, with some claiming that the English terms he uses being too native for a German to use casually, leading to accusations that he was a secret American imposter. Freddy faced allegations of being a sort of social experiment, as well as being a part of a marketing campaign or plant for certain people, brands, or even the United States itself. In particular, numerous people began accusing him of being a CIA operative. Others claimed he was a marketing ploy for Kalshi, and some also claimed that he was using fabricated photos on his account.

Further controversy occurred as many felt that Freddy was pandering disproportionately to American right-wingers. Jay Caspian Kang of The New Yorker, writing on X, stated that he "probably is an online right wing dude", who accumulated traction via engagement bait, and "then now is just boosted propaganda". Kirshner however, while acknowledging that Freddy "is definitely riding a tail wind from being on Elon Musk's personal social media platform, which he has designed to be friendly to Trumpism and the Republican Party", has stated that his admiration for America has nonetheless has appeal outside a narrowly partisan lens. Oremus has described him as mantaining an apolitical persona, and described his initial rejection of his invitation to the White House as "savviest decisions", contrasting with that of a Scottish fan who received backlash after posing with Ron DeSantis.

Many had been under the impression that Freddy was visiting the US for the first time; in actuality, he never said such a thing, but this was gradually reported as truth by people online and outlets such as TMZ. In the wake of Germany's game loss against Paraguay on June 29, many celebrated the fact that he may leave, with one user saying that he was going back to Langley, Virginia, where the CIA headquarters are located, though he is still set to remain in the US for under a month. David Covucci, a journalist at the College Football website FOIABall, seeking to demonstrate that Freddy was not on his first US visit, and to show that "his charming naivety about the U.S. was a tad feigned", retweeted an old post Freddy made in August 2023, which he acknowledged that he had been in the US before. Covucci later claimed to have not realized that in this post.

Netizens on X began digging through his account history. The discovery of his old posts indicating he had visited the US prior made many believe he was lying, as many were under the impression that he had stated that this was his first American visit. This furthered opposition to him online.

Becoming what Oremus described as a "Milkshake Duck", Freddy subsequentially deactivated his X account on June 30, amid mounting criticism. Reactions to his departure from X was mixed, with his supporters lambasting his detractors as "losers" and "bullies". Many right-wingers in the US were quick to lambast those who had "bullied" him off the platform, with Fox News writing several such articles in the aftermath. Nick Adams responded to the development by stating that "Freddy's only 'crime' was loving America and documenting his travels in a completely non-partisan way", adding that "This is what they [leftists] do. They try to scare and silence anyone who doesn't conform." He used the incident to reaffirm that "despite the hateful and angry radical Left's vicious attempts to doxx Freddy," he was still coming to the White House, despite his earlier rejection, stating that he will not let "the radical left" use the incident as "another victory for their politics of hate". Despite this, writing for OutKick, Fox News' sports website, Zach Dean, while still critiquing his "lib" detractors, also blamed Freddy for the turn of events, stating that his act had grown stale, and that even though he never stated he was visiting America for the first time, the way he carried himself online still made him "sort of a fraud". Him an other Fox News writers alleged however that many critiquing him for having been to the US before were leftists angry that he went to "real", small-town America, and not just "coastal elite cities".

After he deactivated his account, he began primarily posting on his Instagram, which he described as having a more positive atmosphere. There, he explained what happened on his story, stating that "too many people seem to have a problem with us having a genuinely good time here...this is ruining the fun a bit for us," and that individuals were scrounging through "22k posts" to find old content "with zero context to make me look like a bad person." Despite this, he claimed that he did not deactivate his account due to the backlash, but that he was planning to do so since the start, having earlier stated that the influencer lifestyle "wasn't for him". Addressing those who believed that he was lying about being in the US for the first time, he stated that he had never said such a thing and that the reactions he was having was since it was his first time visiting the South. He also attributed the claims that he faked content to actual faked tweets and photos of him that were being passed around, stating that "unfortunately, some people are out there even fabricating photos and tweets...just to harm us". Furthermore, he denied that any of his posts were the results of sponsorships or undisclosed advertising, stating that he has only made money from X's creator payouts. He later returned to Twitter on July 13, while in Clemson, South Carolina after receiving public support; he revealed that a group on Reddit had attempted to dox him. Adams subsequentially declared it "a victory for free speech and a triumph of the spirit that makes America great". The development was interpreted as a recent example of individuals who amass large followings swiftly, only to then face large-scale backlash; Aaron Timms, writing for The Guardian, declared Freddy to be the tournament's most revealing character, describing him as becoming a Rorschach test for people's attitudes towards online popularity and emblematic of the attention economy.
