= Bottom of Your Boots =

2026 song by Ella Langley

Song by Ella Langley

from the album Dandelion
- Released: April 10, 2026
- Recorded: 2026
- Genre: Country
- Length: 3:19
- Label: Sawgod; Columbia
- Songwriters: Ella Langley; Will Bundy; Jon Nite
- Producers: Langley; Ben West; Miranda Lambert

Audio video
- "Bottom of Your Boots" on YouTube

"Bottom of Your Boots" is a song by American country music singer Ella Langley, released on April 10, 2026, from her second studio album, Dandelion. She wrote the song with Will Bundy and Jon Nite and produced it with Ben West and Miranda Lambert.

== Background ==
According to Ella Langley, the song was inspired by a pep talk from her father while she was having a difficult week, during which he told her, "I love you from the bottom of my boots to the top of my hat". In early April 2026, She debuted the song live during a pop-up show in Nashville, Tennessee prior to its release.

== Composition ==
The song incorporates blues-influenced guitars, including pedal steel guitar, and drums. Lyrically, Ella Langley seeks reassurance in a relationship, demanding her partner to express his true feelings about her and demonstrate full commitment if he genuinely loves her.

== Critical reception ==
Georgette Brookes of Holler gave a positive review, writing "After a verse that is seemingly about to flow into a mirror image of 'Be Her', Langley then pulls the rug and launches into a fun yet composed chorus. It feels effortlessly Ella and undoubtedly establishes that her stellar vocals are the focus of this project".

== Charts ==
Chart performance for "Bottom of Your Boots"
Chart (2026)	Peak position
Australia (ARIA)	54
Canada Hot 100 (Billboard)	24
Global 200 (Billboard)	71
New Zealand Hot Singles (RMNZ)	2
UK Singles (Official Charts)	77
US Billboard Hot 100	20
US Hot Country Songs (Billboard)	4

== Certifications ==
Certifications for "Bottom of Your Boots"
Region	Certification	Certified units/sales
United States (RIAA)	Gold	500,000^{‡}
^{‡} Sales+streaming figures based on certification alone.
