= Been By Now =

Single by Morgan Wallen
- Released: July 24, 2026
- Genre: Country pop
- Length: 3:33
- Label: Big Loud; Republic; Mercury
- Songwriters: Rocky Block; John Byron; Ryan Vojtesak; Blake Pendergrass; Taylor Phillips; Morgan Wallen
- Producers: Joey Moi; Charlie Handsome; Matt Hastings

Morgan Wallen singles chronology
| "I Can't Love You Anymore" (2026) | "Been By Now" (2026) | "Last Thing You Need" (2026) |

Lyric video
- "Been By Now" on YouTube

"Been By Now" is a song by American country music singer Morgan Wallen. It was released on July 24, 2026 as the lead single from his upcoming fifth studio album. The song was serviced to US Hot AC radio stations on July 27, 2026, and US pop and country radio stations on July 28, 2026.

== Background and composition ==
Following the release of his collaboration with American singer Ella Langley, "I Can't Love You Anymore", in April 2026, Wallen revealed that he was "sitting on seven or eight completed singles" awaiting release, including "Been By Now", later that month. Wallen began teasing "Been By Now" on June 4, 2026, by sharing a snippet of the song in an Instagram post. The full song leaked online via TikTok on June 22, 2026. On July 16, Wallen performed a stripped-down piano rendition of the song on his Instagram, promising it would be released "before the boats get winterized this time". The following day, Wallen announced the song's July 24 release via his Instagram Story, alongside a pre-save link. Following the announcement, Wallen performed "Been By Now" live for the first time during a concert at M&T Bank Stadium in Baltimore, Maryland, that evening. Presenting the song, Wallen said that during a few weeks off tour, he "couldn't help but work a little bit", spending time in the studio working on "whatever's next".

Co-written with Ryan Vojtesak, John Byron, Blake Pendergrass, Rocky Block, and Taylor Phillips, "Been By Now" deals with the end of a relationship after remaining in a "will-they-or-won't-they" stage for too long. It follows the "breezy, alt-pop formula" of Wallen's previous singles, including "Love Somebody", while reflecting on the relationship in hindsight and questioning whether it "was ever meant to last".

== Charts ==
Chart performance for "Been By Now"
| Chart (2026) | Peak position |
|---|---|
| Australia (ARIA) | 33 |
| Australia Country Hot 50 (The Music) | 1 |
| Canada Hot 100 (Billboard) | 2 |
| Canada CHR/Top 40 (Billboard) | 38 |
| Canada Country (Billboard) | 1 |
| Global 200 (Billboard) | 4 |
| Ireland (IRMA) | 79 |
| New Zealand Hot Singles (RMNZ) | 2 |
| Peru Anglo Airplay (Monitor Latino) | 17 |
| UK Singles (Official Charts) | 53 |
| US Billboard Hot 100 | 2 |
| US Country Airplay (Billboard) | 1 |
| US Hot Country Songs (Billboard) | 2 |
