= Dandelion (Ella Langley song) =

2026 song by Ella Langley

Promotional single by Ella Langley

from the album Dandelion
- Released: January 30, 2026
- Genre: Country
- Length: 4:00
- Label: Sawgod; Columbia
- Songwriters: Ella Langley; Joybeth Taylor; Austin Goodloe; Brett Tyler
- Producers: Langley; Goodloe; Ben West; Miranda Lambert

Visualizer
- "Dandelion" on YouTube

"Dandelion" is a song by American country music singer Ella Langley. It was released on January 30, 2026, as a promotional single from her second studio album of the same name. Langley wrote the song with Joybeth Taylor, Austin Goodloe, and Brett Tyler, and produced it with Ben West and Miranda Lambert, with vocal production from Goodloe.

== Composition ==
The song contains a guitar instrumental, over which Ella Langley describes her free spirit, wild side, resilience and desire to be different, while highlighting her enduring connection to her country roots. She compares these aspects of her personality, as well as her feeling of being overlooked throughout her career, to the titular flower, in reference to its ability to survive in harsh environments. Langley sings about approaching relationships with the same independence and authenticity, warning her potential lover of her unconventional ways.

== Critical reception ==
Maxim Mower of Holler described the song as a "undulating slow-burner", with Langley's "enchanting, laidback vocals drifting dreamily" across the instrumental, adding that the song "doesn't pack the same immediately catchy and infectious punch as 'Choosin' Texas' – but that's because it's not supposed to be a Country Radio chart-topper". He considered it to be "intended as an insightful, intimate introduction" to her "exciting new musical chapter", and additionally wrote, "There's a plethora of satisfying garden-related wordplay and imagery that will pique the interest of any country-curious horticulturists".

== Commercial performance ==
Within the two weeks of its release, the song debuted at number seven on the Billboard Hot Country Songs chart, received 7.9 million official U.S. streams and 463,000 in radio airplay audience, and sold 4,000 copies.

== Charts ==
Chart performance for "Dandelion"
Chart (2026)	Peak position
Canada Hot 100 (Billboard)	37
Canada Country (Billboard)	31
Global 200 (Billboard)	103
New Zealand Hot Singles (RMNZ)	9
US Billboard Hot 100	27
US Hot Country Songs (Billboard)	7

== Certifications ==
Certifications for "Dandelion"
Region	Certification	Certified units/sales
United States (RIAA)	Platinum	1,000,000^{‡}
^{‡} Sales+streaming figures based on certification alone.
