= Dandelion (album) =

Studio album by Ella Langley
- Released: April 10, 2026
- Recorded: 2024–2026
- Studios: Sound Emporium (Nashville, Tennessee)
- Genre: Country
- Length: 56:43
- Labels: Sawgod; Columbia
- Producers: Ella Langley; Miranda Lambert; Ben West

Ella Langley chronology
Hungover (2024)	Dandelion (2026)

Singles from Dandelion
- 1. "Choosin' Texas" Released: October 17, 2025; 2. "Be Her" Released: March 23, 2026; 3. "Loving Life Again" Released: July 13, 2026

Singles from Dandelion (reissue)
- 1. "I Can't Love You Anymore" Released: April 24, 2026

Dandelion is the second studio album by American country music singer Ella Langley. It was released through Sawgod and Columbia Records on April 10, 2026. It serves as the follow-up to her debut studio album, Hungover (2024). The album was produced by Langley, Miranda Lambert, and Ben West. It was met with acclaim from critics and reached the top ten in the United Kingdom, Australia, Norway, New Zealand, and Scotland.

The album debuted at number one on the US Billboard 200, making it Langley's first number-one album and the second largest streaming debut for an album of new country material by a female artist, behind Beyoncé's Cowboy Carter. To support the record, Langley launched her first arena tour in North America for the summer of 2026. This announcement follows the global success of the lead single, "Choosin' Texas", which became her first Billboard Hot 100 number one.

== Background and composition ==
In April 2025, Ella Langley confirmed she was back in the studio, with a new album already in the works. Leading up to the 2025's Academy of Country Music Awards, she dealt with a harsh case of impostor syndrome. In August 2025, she canceled many shows to focus on her mental health. Langley would leave the public eye until September, "re-finding" herself. Choosing to prioritize quality over a quick follow-up, Langley pushed her second album's release to 2026 to ensure the new material was fully developed. It was described as a concept album. She believes this record represents her true self, describing the creative process as a seamless experience that captures her personality more deeply than ever before. In the album's trailer, she revealed the concept of the album title "Dandelions are masters of survival, thriving in even the harshest environments. Often dismissed as a common weed, this unassuming plant carries a deeper symbolism of hope, healing, and resilience. This next record to me has so much growth in it". She further noted that, when she told her makeup artist about the title, he informed her that dandelion tea is known as a natural detox for the liver, with Langley noting, "when he said that, it was literally like one of those cartoon light bulbs went off over my head" due to how well it would thematically be her follow-up to her debut studio album, Hungover (2024).

Langley cited the music of Ronnie Milsap as a major influence on Dandelion due to his expansive sound, stating: "if you played Ronnie Millsap, for anyone who was just introduced to country yesterday, and they say, 'What genre is this?' They'd be like, 'Classic country'. And to me, artists like that have given me belief in myself to just explore and create and not put this box around everything where I'm feeling like I need to write this for this and do this and please this person and this person".

== Release and promotion ==
In anticipation for her second record, she put out the Hardy collaboration "Never Met Anyone Like You", a cover of Toby Keith's "Wish I Didn't Know Now", "This Version of Us" for the soundtrack of Nobody Wants This, and the Miranda Lambert-assisted "Choosin' Texas". The latter became a TikTok sensation and a historic chart-topper, making Langley the first female artist to simultaneously lead the Billboard Hot 100, Hot Country Songs, and Country Airplay charts.

On January 27, 2026, she officially announced her second album, Dandelion, set to be released on April 10, preceded by the promotional singles such as "Be Her" and the title track. Unreleased tracks like "Loving Life Again" and "I Gotta Quit"—both of them were performed during her live sets—she confirmed that the two will be part of the upcoming album. On February 2, she announced The Dandelion Tour playing arenas across North America. "Be Her" would be chosen as the second single for the album, being shipped to country radio on March 23, 2026. It peaked at number two on the Billboard Hot 100. The album's full tracklist was revealed on April 2, 2026.

== Critical reception ==
Professional ratings
Aggregate scores
Source	Rating
Metacritic	86/100
Review scores
Source	Rating
AllMusic	4/5 stars
Associated Press	4/5 stars
The Independent	5/5 stars
Rolling Stone	4/5 stars
NME	4.5/5 stars

Dandelion received positive reviews from mainstream music critics. On Metacritic, which assigns a normalized score out of 100 to ratings from professional publications, Dandelion received an average score of 86, based on 6 reviews, indicating "universal acclaim". Marcy Donelson from AllMusic favors the album as "more ambitious outing with 19 tracks and an hour-long playing time, Dandelion offers a more hopeful state of mind, at least on average, with Langley planning to make some changes, like 'drinking less and thinking more'". She also praised the track "Be Her" as "warm, lightly disco-tinged" sound, followed by a "border on feel-good '70s soft rock are contrasted by rootsier ones" towards the track, "It Wasn't God Who Made Honky Tonk Angels", while she called "Last Call for Us" as "dreamy". She concluded the review, calling Dandelion "functions as both a sequel and an appealing fresh start".

The album received sufficient critical acclaim, such as a perfect score from The Independent's Helen Brown, who hailed it as a 'country classic'. Will Hermes from Rolling Stone gave the album four out of five stars, which he called Langley "one of those artists destined for the trenches that divide the indie Americana scene and the king-making world of country radio". He also noted the album is "a twangy neo-trad country set branded with a knowing taste for nostalgia, with a twentysomething's smart-ass plainspokenness and just enough commercial sheen, it shone brightest on deep cuts", concluding the review as a "coherent, fully-realized album, from an artist who feels fully-formed". Kayleigh Watson from NME stated, "no matter how far her career takes her from home, she is proud of and will never escape her roots. 'Bible in my blood and 'Bama in my veins', Langley says, while quipping how no amount of fame can make her switch Jack for champagne. Because, if we're being honest, her wildcard authenticity and fiery free spirit is the reason all eyes are on her now".

== Commercial performance ==
Dandelion became her first number one on the Billboard 200 and the Top Country Albums chart, debuting with 169,000 equivalent album units in the US for the week ending April 24, 2026. This also became Langley's biggest debut week in terms of sales, and she also recorded the highest first-week total consumption for a female country artist this year. It kept the top position in its second week, with 106,000 copies sold. In its third week, it placed at number two, but however improved slightly at 112,000 copies. As of June 2026, Dandelion has spent nine weeks on the Billboard 200 chart at the top five, being barred off the top spot from two albums such as Noah Kahan's The Great Divide and Drake's Iceman. Since its release, it has sold over 1,381,729 album equivalent units in the United States. It also opened at number one in Canada. The album was certified double platinum by the Recording Industry Association of America (RIAA) on October 5, 2026, denoting two million equivalent units in the United States. It was also certified gold in Canada within twelve days of its release.

Outside North America, Dandelion was a commercial success in international waters, where it opened at number one on the country charts in Australia and the United Kingdom. It also opened within the top five in Australia, New Zealand, and Scotland. It debuted within the top ten in the United Kingdom and Norway.

== Track listing ==
Dandelion track listing
No.	Title	Writer(s)	Length
1.	"Froggy Went a Courtin' (Intro)"	Traditional	0:23
2.	"Dandelion"	Ella Langley; Austin Goodloe; Brett Tyler; Joybeth Taylor	4:00
3.	"Choosin' Texas"	Langley; Luke Dick; Miranda Lambert; Taylor	3:51
4.	"We Know Us"	Langley; Ben West; Taylor	3:06
5.	"Low Lights"	Langley; Taylor	3:52
6.	"Be Her"	Langley; Jordan Schmidt; Michael Hardy; Smith Ahnquist	3:37
7.	"You & Me Time"	Langley; Aaron Ratiere; Taylor	3:20
8.	"Loving Life Again"	Langley; Devin Dawson; Ernest Keith Smith	3:46
9.	"Bottom of Your Boots"	Langley; Will Bundy; Jon Nite	3:19
10.	"Speaking Terms"	Helene Cronin; Taylor	4:23
11.	"I Gotta Quit"	Langley; Aaron Ratiere; Taylor	2:21
12.	"It Wasn't God Who Made Honky Tonk Angels"	J.D. Miller	3:23
13.	"Last Call for Us"	Langley; Goodloe; Tyler; Taylor	3:31
14.	"Broken"	Langley; Goodloe; Laura Veltz; Taylor	3:03
15.	"Somethin' Simple"	Langley; Meg McRee; Chris LaCorte; Taylor	3:27
16.	"Butterfly Season" (featuring Miranda Lambert)	Langley; Dick; Lambert; Taylor	3:32
17.	"Most Good Things Do (Acoustic)"	Langley; Dick; Raitiere; Taylor	2:58
18.	"Froggy Went a Courtin' (Outro)"	Traditional	0:51
Total length:			56:43

Digital reissue bonus track
No.	Title	Writer(s)	Length
19.	"I Can't Love You Anymore" (with Morgan Wallen)	Langley; Goodloe; Taylor	3:49
Total length:			60:32

== Personnel ==
Credits are adapted from Tidal.

=== Musicians ===
- Ella Langley – vocals (all tracks), acoustic guitar (tracks 1, 18), background vocals (2, 4, 6–9, 13–16)
- Charlie Worsham – acoustic guitar (1–9, 11–17, 19), mandolin (3, 4, 8, 15, 19), banjo (6)
- Spencer Cullum – pedal steel guitar (2, 4–9, 11–16, 19), steel guitar (3)
- Tom Bukovac – electric guitar (2–9, 11–16, 19)
- Ben West – background vocals (2, 5, 7, 14, 15, 19), Wurlitzer piano (2, 6), percussion (4, 5, 14), Mellotron (5, 16), acoustic guitar (10, 13, 15, 16), Hammond organ (14, 19); bass guitar, Omnichord, piano (16)
- Rachel Loy – bass guitar (2–9, 13–16, 19)
- Ben Flanders – electric guitar (2–9, 13–16, 19)
- Aksel Coe – drums, percussion (2–7, 9, 13, 15, 16)
- Dave Cohen – Hammond organ (2, 4), keyboards (3, 4, 9), Mellotron (4, 13)
- Austin Goodloe – background vocals (2, 9, 13, 14, 19); acoustic and electric guitar, keyboards, piano, and synthesizer (19)
- Miranda Lambert – background vocals (3, 7, 16)
- Gideon Klein – arrangement, cello (5, 10); double bass (5)
- David Angell – violin (5, 10)
- David Davidson – violin (5, 10)
- Monica Angell – viola (5, 10)
- David Dorn – Hammond organ (6, 7, 9, 15, 16), synthesizer (6, 8, 14), celeste (6), piano (11–13), Wurlitzer piano (14), keyboards (15)
- Jordan Schmidt – percussion (6)
- Aaron Raitiere – background vocals (7, 11)
- Joybeth Taylor – background vocals (7)
- Aaron Sterling – drums, percussion (8, 14, 19)
- Devin Dawson – acoustic guitar, baritone guitar, electric guitar, Hammond organ, programming (8)
- Ernest – background vocals (8)
- Tony Lucido – bass guitar (11, 12)
- Lonnie Wilson – drums (11, 12)
- Rob McNelley – electric guitar (11, 12)
- Carter Faith – background vocals (12)
- Jake Worthington – background vocals (12)
- Laura Veltz – background vocals (14)

=== Technical ===
- Ella Langley – production
- Ben West – production (1–10, 12–18), engineering (3, 10, 15, 16), vocal engineering (2–5, 7, 14, 15), editing (2, 4–17, 19)
- Miranda Lambert – production (2–17)
- Devin Dawson – production, engineering, vocal engineering, editing (8)
- Dave Clauss – mixing (all tracks), engineering (2–9, 14–16, 19), vocal engineering (3, 5, 7, 16, 19), editing (7, 11)
- Sean Moffitt – engineering (1, 18), vocal engineering (1, 6, 18)
- Gabriel Klein – engineering (10)
- Chuck Ainlay – engineering (11, 17), vocal engineering (10–12, 16, 17), editing (12, 17)
- Austin Goodloe – vocal production (2, 9, 13, 14), vocal engineering (2, 7, 9, 11, 12, 14, 19), programming (19)
- Mike Stankiewicz – vocal engineering (2, 6, 9, 13, 14)
- Kam Luchterhand – vocal engineering (2, 7, 12)
- Jordan Schmidt – vocal engineering (6)
- Evan Ridgway – engineering assistance (1, 10, 18)
- Jase Keithley – engineering assistance (1, 18)
- David Paulin – engineering assistance (2–5, 7, 9, 11, 12, 17)
- Steve Cordray – engineering assistance (5, 10)
- Grant Wilson – engineering assistance (6, 8, 13–16)
- Phillip Smith – engineering assistance (19)
- Andrew Mendelson – mastering (1, 2, 4–19)
- Pete Lyman – mastering (3)
- Sam Bergeson – editing (2, 6, 9, 13, 14)
- Kelsey Granda – project coordination
- Alyson McAnally – project coordination (10–12, 17)

== Charts ==
Chart performance for Dandelion
Chart (2026)	Peak position
Australian Albums (ARIA)	3
Australian Country Albums (ARIA)	1
Belgian Albums (Ultratop Flanders)	136
Canadian Albums (Billboard)	1
Dutch Albums (Album Top 100)	51
Irish Albums (Official Charts)	13
New Zealand Albums (RMNZ)	3
Norwegian Albums (IFPI Norge)	9
Scottish Albums (Official Charts)	3
Swedish Albums (Sverigetopplistan)	29
Swiss Albums (Schweizer Hitparade)	92
UK Albums (Official Charts)	7
UK Country Albums (Official Charts)	1
US Billboard 200	1
US Top Country Albums (Billboard)	1

== Certifications ==
Certifications for Dandelion
Region	Certification	Certified units/sales
Canada (Music Canada)	Gold	40,000^{‡}
New Zealand (RMNZ)	Platinum	15,000^{‡}
Norway (IFPI Norway)	Gold	10,000^{‡}
United Kingdom (BPI)	Silver	60,000^{‡}
United States (RIAA)	2× Platinum	2,000,000^{‡}
^{‡} Sales+streaming figures based on certification alone.
