= Never Met Anyone Like You =

2025 promotional single by Ella Langley featuring Hardy

Promotional single by Ella Langley featuring Hardy
- Released: June 27, 2025
- Genre: Country
- Length: 2:48
- Label: Sawgod; Columbia
- Songwriters: Ella Langley; Michael Hardy; Jordan Schmidt
- Producer: Schmidt

Audio video
- "Never Met Anyone Like You" on YouTube

"Never Met Anyone Like You" is a song by American country music singer Ella Langley, released on June 27, 2025. It features American country music singer Hardy and was produced by Jordan Schmidt.

== Background ==
Ella Langley has been a big fan of Hardy. When she signed her publishing deal, she wanted to wait to arrange a writing session with him until she was prominent enough for him to be excited to work with her. Hardy proposed an idea to write a song called "Never Met Anyone Like You" that would initially convey love but in the end reveal that the titular phrase is used to mean the opposite.

Langley shared a snippet of herself performing an acoustic version of the song on June 18, 2025. She continued to tease the song in the week up to its release.

== Composition ==
The song uses acoustic guitar for most of its duration, as Ella Langley seemingly praises the positive qualities of her partner in an affectionate manner. She describes his charisma and her friends' attraction to him in the opening verse and brings up his music preferences, treatment of his mother and heart in the second verse, while in the chorus she calls him "one in a million". The instrumental changes to a "jagged and angsty" atmosphere in the bridge, which introduces hard rock-style electric guitars to replace the acoustic strumming. At this point, Langley reveals he was an unfaithful partner who cheated on her with her friend and blamed her for his actions.

== Charts ==
Chart performance for "Never Met Anyone Like You"
Chart (2025)	Peak position
Canada Hot 100 (Billboard)	87
New Zealand Hot Singles (RMNZ)	30
UK Country Airplay (Radiomonitor)	1
US Bubbling Under Hot 100 (Billboard)	4
US Hot Country Songs (Billboard)	39

== Certifications ==
Certifications for "Never Met Anyone Like You"
Region	Certification	Certified units/sales
United States (RIAA)	Gold	500,000^{‡}
^{‡} Sales+streaming figures based on certification alone.
