= Loving Life Again =

2026 single by Ella Langley

Single by Ella Langley

from the album Dandelion
- Released: July 13, 2026
- Genre: Country
- Length: 3:46
- Label: Sawgod; Columbia
- Songwriters: Ella Langley; Ernest Keith Smith; Devin Dawson
- Producers: Ella Langley; Miranda Lambert; Ben West

Ella Langley singles chronology
"I Can't Love You Anymore" (2026)	"Loving Life Again" (2026)	"Jaded" (2026)

Lyric video
- "Loving Life Again" on YouTube

"Loving Life Again" is a song by American country music singer Ella Langley. It impacted country radio on July 13, 2026, as the fourth single from her second studio album, Dandelion. She wrote it with Devin Dawson and Ernest Keith Smith (who also provides background vocals on the song) and produced it with Miranda Lambert and Ben West.

== Background ==
During a concert in Chattanooga, Tennessee, Ella Langley explained that the song was inspired by her mental health challenges, which had continued after she achieved success in her music career. Due to depression, she canceled two weeks of shows and spent that time at home with her parents, who helped her with her recovery. Langley also received support from Ernest, to whom she had confided her struggles. They based the song on their conversation following her return: when Ernest asked how she was doing, she replied, "Well, looks like I'm back to loving life again". They subsequently wrote the chorus and finished the song a few days later with help from Devin Dawson.

In November 2025, Langley debuted the song live during a concert at the Ryman Auditorium, performing it with Ernest.

== Composition ==
The song is composed of "warm, cushioning" guitars. In the first verse, Ella Langley reflects on dealing with her life's challenges, comparing it to changing seasons and noting that she tends to become absorbed in negative states of mind that are difficult to escape from. She describes coping with these challenging moments by turning to fond memories and music; as the song reaches the chorus, she finds peace in music and joy in her life again. Langley also reminisces about her childhood memories, including riding her quarter horse through the pines and hearing her grandmother call her from inside her home.

== Critical reception ==
Maxim Mower of Holler gave a positive review, writing "The peaceful, comforting ambience of the instrumental mirrors the newfound equanimity Langley has discovered. Langley showcases her charismatic, compelling vocals throughout, lacing a sense of ease into her delivery, accentuating the tranquil spirit of the track".

== Charts ==
Chart performance for "Loving Life Again"
Chart (2026)	Peak position
Australia (ARIA)	69
Canada Hot 100 (Billboard)	22
Canada Country (Billboard)	1
Global 200 (Billboard)	80
Japan Hot Overseas (Billboard Japan)	9
New Zealand Hot Singles (RMNZ)	9
US Billboard Hot 100	16
US Country Airplay (Billboard)	1
US Hot Country Songs (Billboard)	5

== Certifications ==
Certifications for "Loving Life Again"
Region	Certification	Certified units/sales
United States (RIAA)	Platinum	1,000,000^{‡}
^{‡} Sales+streaming figures based on certification alone.
