= I Can't Love You Anymore (Ella Langley and Morgan Wallen song) =

Single by Ella Langley and Morgan Wallen

from the album Dandelion (reissue)
- Released: April 24, 2026
- Genre: Country pop
- Length: 3:48
- Label: Sawgod; Columbia
- Songwriters: Austin Goodloe; Ella Langley; Joybeth Taylor
- Producers: Ella Langley; Austin Goodloe; Ben West

Ella Langley singles chronology
"Be Her" (2026)	"I Can't Love You Anymore" (2026)	"Loving Life Again" (2026)

Morgan Wallen singles chronology
"Don't We" (2026)	"I Can't Love You Anymore" (2026)	"Been By Now" (2026)

Lyric video
- "I Can't Love You Anymore" on YouTube

"I Can't Love You Anymore" is a song by American singers Ella Langley and Morgan Wallen. It was released on April 24, 2026, through Sawgod and Columbia. The song marks the first collaboration between Langley and Wallen, and it appears on the reissue of Langley's second studio album, Dandelion (2026).

== Background and promotion ==
Ahead of the start of her new era, and followed by a period focused on her health, Langley first performed with Wallen in June 2025 when she joined him on his I'm the Problem tour. In April 2026, Langley appeared on the This Past Weekend podcast hosted by Theo Von, where she spoke extensively about Wallen and their experiences performing together on stage, including forgetting the words to "What I Want" during one of their duets, and revealed that he would frequently tease her about it.

On April 1, 2026, Langley released the music video for her single "Choosin' Texas", in which a license plate bearing the acronym "ICLYA" can be seen, standing for "I Can't Love You Anymore", alongside a Tennessee state symbol representing Wallen. Wallen brought out Langley during his Nashville concert on April 3 and announced that he would share the first "little sneak peeks" of new music soon. On April 18, 2026, Langley joined Wallen for an eighth time during his tour in Tuscaloosa, Alabama. As Langley appeared on stage with Wallen, the pair announced that they had recorded a duet, "I Can't Love You Anymore", set to be released the following Friday, April 24. The announcement was followed by the duo performing the song live for the first time.

== Lyrics and composition ==
"I Can't Love You Anymore" was described as a "passionate mid-tempo heartbreaker" that carries a "sultry, '70s-influenced sound", reminiscent of Fleetwood Mac. It revolves around a "dysfunctional relationship", caught between "exhaustion" and an "inability" to separate from one another. The song was written by Langley and later sent to Wallen.

== Charts ==
Chart performance for "I Can't Love You Anymore"
Chart (2026)	Peak position
Australia (ARIA)	48
Canada Hot 100 (Billboard)	12
Canada Country (Billboard)	1
Finland Airplay (Radiosoittolista)	62
Global 200 (Billboard)	30
Ireland (IRMA)	57
New Zealand Hot Singles (RMNZ)	5
Norway (IFPI Norge)	61
Sweden Heatseeker (Sverigetopplistan)	18
UK Country Airplay (Radiomonitor)	3
UK Singles (Official Charts)	68
US Billboard Hot 100	4
US Country Airplay (Billboard)	1
US Hot Country Songs (Billboard)	3

== Certifications ==
Certifications for "I Can't Love You Anymore"
Region	Certification	Certified units/sales
United States (RIAA)	Platinum	1,000,000^{‡}
^{‡} Sales+streaming figures based on certification alone.
