= Be Her =

2026 song by Ella Langley

- Promotional poster

Single by Ella Langley

from the album Dandelion
- Released: March 23, 2026
- Genre: Country
- Length: 3:38
- Label: Sawgod; Columbia
- Songwriters: Ella Langley; Jordan Schmidt; Michael Hardy; Smith Ahnquist
- Producers: Ella Langley; Ben West; Miranda Lambert

Ella Langley singles chronology
"Choosin' Texas" (2025)	"Be Her" (2026)	"I Can't Love You Anymore" (2026)

Music video
- "Be Her" on YouTube

"Be Her" is a song by American country music singer Ella Langley. The song was serviced to country radio on March 23, 2026, as the second single from her second studio album, Dandelion. Langley wrote the song with Jordan Schmidt, Michael Hardy, and Smith Ahnquist, and produced it with Ben West and Miranda Lambert. It peaked at No. 2 on the Billboard Hot 100, being blocked by her own song "Choosin' Texas". The song inspired her debut fragrance in April 2026, developed in partnership with NOYZ.

== Composition ==
According to co-writer Hardy, the song "basically wrote itself" in approximately 30 minutes during their writing session. Described as a "neo-traditional" country ballad with a "steel-soaked" and "retro, '90s-inspired" feel, it features lush, reverb-laden guitars and ethereal pedal steel. The track is an introspective "anthem" focused on self-worth and the longing for a life of simplicity and authenticity. Lyrics depict an idealized version of a woman who is "grounded in her faith" and "completely comfortable in her own skin".

== Critical reception ==
Critics have praised the song for its "vulnerability" and "raw honesty". The Music Universe described it as "honestly and sharply written", highlighting Langley's "unmistakable vocal".

== Music video ==
The official music video for "Be Her" was released on February 13, 2026, co-directed by Langley herself alongside Wales Toney. The video mirrors her journey toward self-actualization, using symbolic imagery to bridge the gap between who she is and who she wants to become.

== Charts ==
Chart performance for "Be Her"
Chart (2026)	Peak position
Australia (ARIA)	28
Australia Airplay (RCS)	10
Brazil Airplay (Crowley)	121
Canada Hot 100 (Billboard)	6
Canada Country (Billboard)	1
Colombia Anglo Airplay (Monitor Latino)	8
Denmark Airplay (Tracklisten)	14
Global 200 (Billboard)	25
Ireland (IRMA)	33
New Zealand (Recorded Music NZ)	19
Nigeria (TurnTable Top 100)	75
Nigeria Airplay (TurnTable)	39
Portugal Airplay (AFP)	22
UK Singles (Official Charts)	28
UK Country Airplay (Radiomonitor)	3
US Billboard Hot 100	2
US Adult Contemporary (Billboard)	21
US Adult Pop Airplay (Billboard)	37
US Country Airplay (Billboard)	1
US Hot Country Songs (Billboard)	2

== Certifications ==
Certifications for "Be Her"
Region	Certification	Certified units/sales
Australia (ARIA)	Gold	35,000^{‡}
New Zealand (RMNZ)	Platinum	30,000^{‡}
United Kingdom (BPI)	Silver	200,000^{‡}
United States (RIAA)	3× Platinum	3,000,000^{‡}
^{‡} Sales+streaming figures based on certification alone.

== Release history ==
Release dates and formats for "Be Her"
Region	Date	Format(s)	Label(s)	Ref.
United States	March 23, 2026	Country radio	Triple Tigers; Columbia; Sawgod	
