= Ella Langley =

American country singer-songwriter (born 1999)

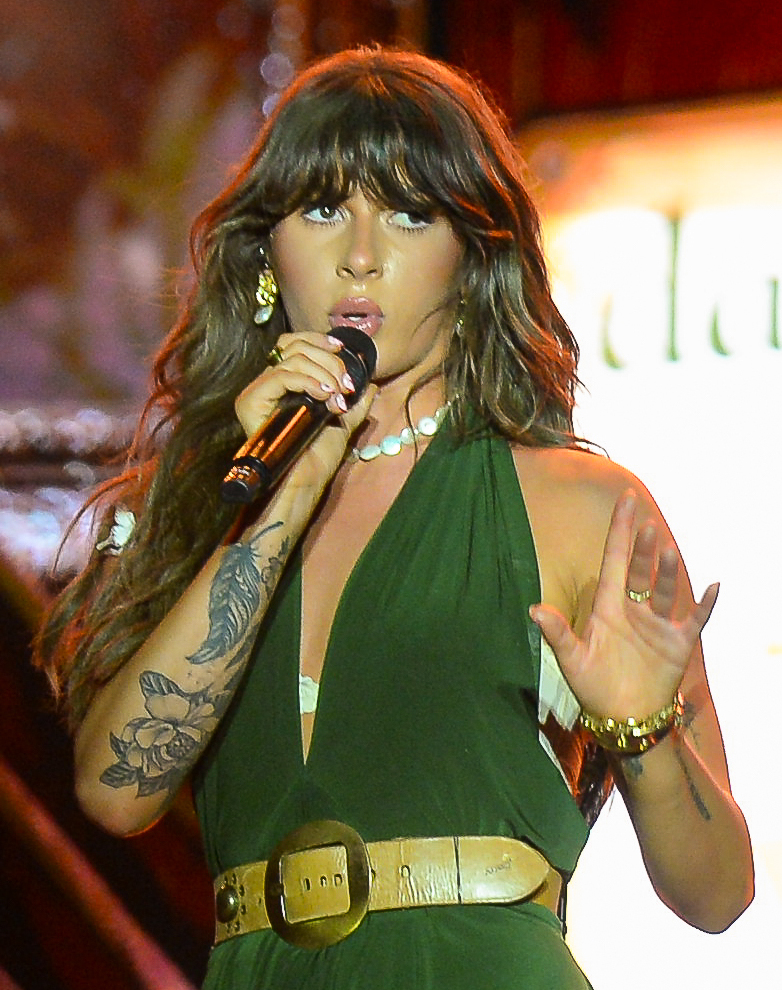
- Langley performing in 2026

Background information
- Born: Elizabeth Camille Langley; May 3, 1999 (age 27); Hope Hull, Alabama, U.S.
- Genre: Country
- Occupations: Singer; songwriter
- Instruments: Vocals; guitar
- Years active: 2017–present
- Labels: Sony Nashville; Columbia
- Website: ellalangley.com

Elizabeth Camille Langley (born May 3, 1999) is an American singer-songwriter. She is signed to Sony Music Nashville and Columbia Records. Her debut studio album, Hungover (2024), produced breakthrough hits "You Look Like You Love Me" and "Weren't for the Wind", which both topped the Country Airplay chart.

Her second studio album, Dandelion (2026), debuted atop the US Billboard 200. Its lead single, "Choosin' Texas", became the longest-running number-one song in US Billboard Hot 100 history and made Langley the first female artist to simultaneously top the US Hot 100, Hot Country Songs, and Country Airplay charts.

== Early life ==
Elizabeth Camille Langley was born in Hope Hull, Alabama, on May 3, 1999, and grew up in a musically inclined family alongside her two brothers and sister. Langley was homeschooled in Montgomery until seventh grade due to being a "distraction." Her early exposure to music came through singing in Southern Baptist churches and informal jam sessions. She loved sitting next to her grandfather at the piano, singing "Frog Went a-Courting". After her grandfather's death, her father had his guitar restrung for her when she was 14. That same night, she looked up the chords to "Three Little Birds" by Bob Marley and taught herself to play the song. She initially practiced performing in front of her family's cow pasture.

In 2016, she gave her first public performance at Hooper Academy in Hope Hull, in the student talent show. In high school she worked at a trampoline park and also performed at local venues before graduating in 2017. After graduation, she attended Auburn University to study forestry. During college, she was a member of Phi Mu sorority.

== Career ==
=== 2017–2023: Early career and Excuse the Mess ===
In 2017, Langley co-wrote her first song, "Clear the Clouds", with her aunt, starting from a melody she played on her porch at home. The song was recorded at Guest House Studios in Eclectic, Alabama, and released on YouTube. Her debut single, "Perfect" was released on May 24, 2018, although it and much of her early catalog was later removed from streaming platforms. Over the next two years, she continued to perform across Alabama at various bars and festivals. In 2019, Langley moved to Nashville and immersed herself in the local songwriting community and participated in numerous writers' rounds. She gained support from independent country platforms, including "Raised Rowdy" and "65 South" during that time. During the COVID-19 pandemic in 2020, she shifted her focus to livestreaming and expanding her online presence.

In 2021, she signed her first publishing deal with Sony Music Publishing Nashville. Also in 2021, she released a track, titled "If You Have To", after previewing the single on TikTok. In early 2022, Langley joined Randy Houser as a guest artist on his tour. On October 28, Langley released the promotional single, "Country Boy's Dream Girl". In 2023, she made her Grand Ole Opry debut on February 17.

The following week, she signed a record deal with Sony Music Nashville and Columbia Records. She collaborated with Koe Wetzel on the song "That's Why We Fight", released on April 21. Her debut extended play (EP), Excuse the Mess, came out on May 19. In addition to her solo work, Langley co-wrote multiple tracks for other artists, including five songs on Elle King's Come Get Your Wife and a Runaway June single, "Make Me Wanna Smoke". Langley also recorded a duet with Kameron Marlowe titled "Strangers", which served as the lead single from his second studio album, Keepin' the Lights On. From 2023 through 2024, she opened for artists Jon Pardi and Riley Green.

=== 2024–present: Hungover and Dandelion ===
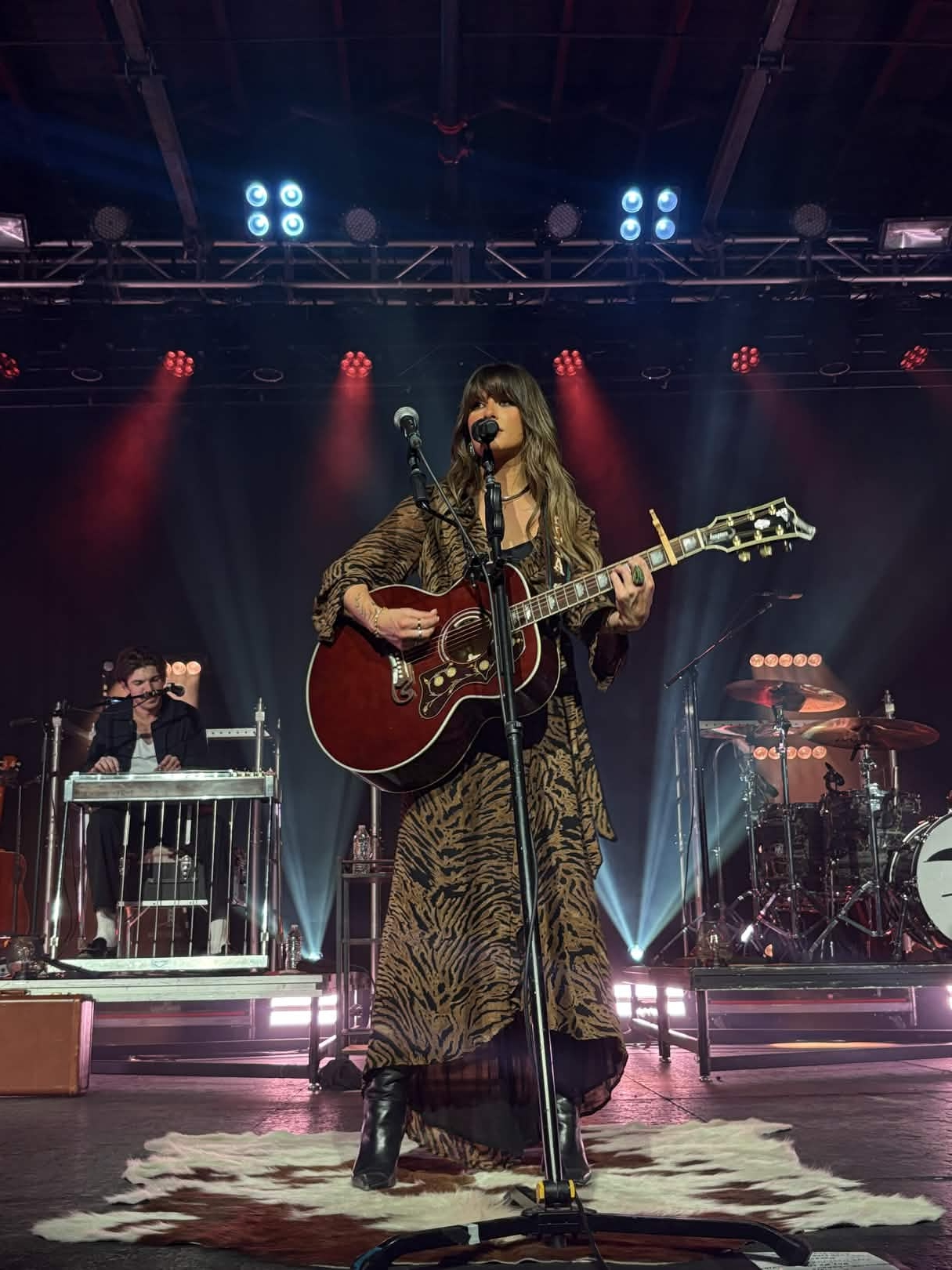
Ella Langley in 2025

Langley's full-length debut studio album, Hungover, was released on August 2, 2024. It debuted at No. 77 on the Billboard 200 and No. 11 on the Billboard Top Country Albums chart. After the release of the deluxe edition, Still Hungover, on November 1, 2024, the album re-entered the Billboard 200 at No. 49. Among several promotional singles, "You Look Like You Love Me", featuring Riley Green, gained significant traction after going viral on TikTok. It became her first entry on the Billboard Hot 100, debuting at number 53. Released to country radio on August 5, 2024, the song peaked at No. 30 on the Billboard Country Airplay, ultimately earning Platinum certification and going to No. 1—making her the only woman in 2024 to achieve this milestone.

In June 2024, Langley announced the Hungover Tour to support her debut album. A subsequent headlining run, the Still Hungover Tour, took place from January through April 2025. The second single from the deluxe album, "Weren't for the Wind", was released to country radio on January 2, 2025. It became her then-highest-charting single on the Hot 100, peaking at No. 18, and her second country radio No. 1. Her second duet with Riley Green "Don't Mind If I Do" was her third country radio number one song. She also collaborated with American rapper BigXthaPlug on his country rap song "Hell at Night". Langley is one of a few entertainment celebrity spokespeople for Chase Bank's 2025 advertising campaign promoting its Sapphire Reserve premium credit card.

Langley confirmed that the release of her second album would be delayed until 2026, a decision she says is driven by her desire to take her time crafting the material rather than rushing a follow-up album. Prior to its release, she released the singles "Never Met Anyone Like You", a collaboration with Hardy in June, and "Choosin' Texas", co-written and co-produced with Miranda Lambert. "Choosin' Texas" went viral on TikTok and debuted at No. 39 on the Billboard Hot 100, her highest debut at the time. The song would go on to become the first by a female artist to reach number one on the Hot 100, Hot Country Songs, and Country Airplay charts all at once. It has spent 28 non-consecutive weeks on top of the Billboard Hot 100, the longest reign in the chart's history.

On January 27, 2026, Langley formally announced her second album, Dandelion, which released on April 10, 2026. The album's title track, "Be Her", and "Loving Life Again" were released in promotion for the record. Dandelion debuted at number one on the US Billboard 200, making it Langley's first number-one album and the largest streaming debut for an album of new country material by a female country primary artist. The second single "Be Her" peaked at No. 2 on the Billboard Hot 100, being blocked from the top by her own "Choosin' Texas", making her the first female country primary artist in history to occupy the top 2 simultaneously. On September 22, 2026, "Choosin' Texas" broke Billboard's Hot 100 record for number of weeks at number one. An all-female lineup of opening acts was booked for her Dandelion tour, which ran through August 2026, featuring artists like Gabriella Rose, Kaitlin Butts, Avery Anna, Laci Kaye Booth, and Madeline Edwards.

Langley led the nominations for the 2026 CMA Awards, with nine, tying Miranda Lambert and Lainey Wilson’s record for most nominations received by a female artist in a single year. Langley won six CMA awards that year, the most ever won by a woman in one night, became the first artist to win Single and Song of the Year in consecutive years, and became the first woman to win the top five major categories in a single night (those categories being Entertainer of the Year, Female Vocalist of the Year, Album of the Year, Single of the Year, and Song of the Year).

== Artistry ==
Langley's influences include rock, country, and folk. She admires artists including Stevie Nicks and Willie Nelson for their raw, honest songwriting and she also appreciates 1970s and 1980s rock bands for their performances on stage, artistry, and music. She combines Southern rock, folk, and country influences to create a raw sound shaped by her musical upbringing.

== Personal life ==
Langley has been outspoken about being a Christian and having mental health struggles, including depression and impostor syndrome. She has lived in Nashville, Tennessee since 2019.

== Other ventures ==
In 2025, Langley participated in St. Jude Children's Research Hospital Music Gives to St. Jude Kids fundraising campaign, appearing in promotional materials for the charity's annual shirt initiative.

In February 2026, Langley was named American Eagle Outfitters' "Denim Darling", serving as the face of their "American Eagle Jeans Country" advertisement campaign.

Langley debuted her "Be Her" fragrance in April 2026, developed in partnership with NOYZ.

== Discography ==
Studio albums

- Hungover (2024)
- Dandelion (2026)

== Tours ==
=== Headlining ===
- Hungover Tour (2024)
- Still Hungover Tour (2025)
- Damn Country Music Tour (2025) (with Riley Green)
- The Dandelion Tour (2026)

=== Opening ===
- Live in Concert (2022) (with Randy Houser)
- Mr. Saturday Night World Tour (2023) (with Jon Pardi)
- Gravel & Gold Tour (2024) (with Dierks Bentley)
- One Night at a Time (2024) (with Morgan Wallen)
- Ain't My Last Rodeo Tour (2024) (with Riley Green)
- I'm the Problem Tour (2025) (with Morgan Wallen)
- Free the Machine Tour (2026) (with Eric Church)
- Still the Problem Tour (2026) (with Morgan Wallen)

== Awards and nominations ==
Award	Year	Work	Category	Result	Ref.
Academy of Country Music Awards	2025	Herself	Female Artist of the Year	Nominated	
Academy of Country Music Awards	2025	Herself	New Female Artist of the Year	Won	
Academy of Country Music Awards	2025	"You Look Like You Love Me" (with Riley Green)	Single of the Year	Won	
Academy of Country Music Awards	2025	"You Look Like You Love Me" (with Riley Green)	Song of the Year	Nominated	
Academy of Country Music Awards	2025	"You Look Like You Love Me" (with Riley Green)	Musical Event of the Year	Won	
Academy of Country Music Awards	2025	"You Look Like You Love Me" (with Riley Green)	Visual Media of the Year	Won	
Academy of Country Music Awards	2026	Herself	Artist-Songwriter of the Year	Won	
Academy of Country Music Awards	2026	Herself	Female Artist of the Year	Won	
Academy of Country Music Awards	2026	"Choosin' Texas"	Single of the Year	Won	
Academy of Country Music Awards	2026	"Choosin' Texas"	Song of the Year	Won	
Academy of Country Music Awards	2026	"Dont Mind If I Do" (with Riley Green)	Music Event of the Year	Won	
American Music Awards	2025	Herself	Favorite Country Female Artist	Nominated	
American Music Awards	2026	Herself	New Artist of the Year	Nominated	
American Music Awards	2026	Herself	Favorite Country Female Artist	Won	
American Music Awards	2026	"Choosin' Texas"	Song of the Year	Nominated	
American Music Awards	2026	"Choosin' Texas"	Song of the Summer	Nominated	
American Music Awards	2026	"Choosin' Texas"	Best Country Song	Won	
Country Music Association Awards	2024	"You Look Like You Love Me" (with Riley Green)	Musical Event of the Year	Won	
Country Music Association Awards	2025	Herself	Female Vocalist of the Year	Nominated	
Country Music Association Awards	2025	Herself	New Artist of the Year	Nominated	
Country Music Association Awards	2025	"You Look Like You Love Me" (with Riley Green)	Single of the Year	Won	
Country Music Association Awards	2025	"You Look Like You Love Me" (with Riley Green)	Song of the Year	Won	
Country Music Association Awards	2025	"You Look Like You Love Me" (with Riley Green)	Music Video of the Year	Won	
Country Music Association Awards	2025	"Don't Mind If I Do" (with Riley Green)	Musical Event of the Year	Nominated	
Country Music Association Awards	2026	Herself	Entertainer of the Year	Won	
Country Music Association Awards	2026	Herself	Female Vocalist of the Year	Won	
Country Music Association Awards	2026	Dandelion	Album of the Year	Won	
Country Music Association Awards	2026	"Choosin' Texas"	Single of the Year	Won	
Country Music Association Awards	2026	"Choosin' Texas"	Song of the Year	Won	
Country Music Association Awards	2026	"Choosin' Texas"	Music Video of the Year	Won	
Country Music Association Awards	2026	"Be Her"	Single of the Year	Nominated	
Country Music Association Awards	2026	"Be Her"	Song of the Year	Nominated	
Country Music Association Awards	2026	"I Can't Love You Anymore" (with Morgan Wallen)	Musical Event of the Year	Nominated	
CMT Music Awards	2024	"That's Why We Fight" (with Koe Wetzel)	Collaborative Video of the Year	Nominated	
GMA Dove Awards	2026	"Speaking Terms"	Country/Roots Recorded Song of the Year	Nominated	
Grammy Awards	2027	Album of the Year	Dandelion	Pending	
Grammy Awards	2027	Best Contemporary Country Album	Dandelion	Pending	
Grammy Awards	2027	Record of the Year	"Choosin' Texas"	Pending	
Grammy Awards	2027	Song of the Year	"Choosin' Texas"	Pending	
Grammy Awards	2027	Best Country Solo Performance	"Choosin' Texas"	Pending	
Grammy Awards	2027	Best Country Song	"Choosin' Texas"	Pending	
Grammy Awards	2027	Best New Artist	Herself	Pending	
iHeartRadio Music Awards	2026	Herself	Best New Country Artist	Won	
iHeartRadio Music Awards	2026	"Choosin' Texas"	Best Lyrics	Nominated	
iHeartRadio Music Awards	2026	Still Hungover Tour	Favorite Tour Style	Nominated	
MTV Video Music Awards	2026	"Choosin' Texas"	Song of the Year	Nominated	
MTV Video Music Awards	2026	"Choosin' Texas"	Best Country	Won	
MTV Video Music Awards	2026	"Choosin' Texas"	Best Long Form Video	Nominated	
MTV Video Music Awards	2026	"Choosin' Texas"	Song of Summer	Nominated	
