= Choosin' Texas =

2025 single by Ella Langley

Single by Ella Langley

from the album Dandelion
- Written: October 2024
- Released: October 17, 2025
- Recorded: 2025
- Studio: Sound Emporium (Nashville, Tennessee)
- Genre: Country
- Length: 3:52
- Label: Sawgod; Sony Nashville; Columbia
- Songwriters: Ella Langley; Luke Dick; Miranda Lambert; Joybeth Taylor
- Producers: Langley; Ben West; Miranda Lambert

Ella Langley singles chronology
"Hell at Night" (2025)	"Choosin' Texas" (2025)	"Be Her" (2026)

Music video
- "Choosin' Texas" on YouTube

"Choosin' Texas" is a song by American country music singer Ella Langley. It was released on October 17, 2025, as the lead single from her second studio album Dandelion (2026). She wrote it with Luke Dick, Miranda Lambert, and Joybeth Taylor, and produced it with Lambert and Ben West. The song features background vocals from Lambert and guitar playing by Tom Bukovac and Ben Flanders.

The song became Langley's first number-one single on the Billboard Hot 100, spending 28 non-consecutive weeks on top. It set the record for the longest-running number-one single and surpassed Mariah Carey's "All I Want for Christmas Is You" to become the longest-running chart-topper since the music chart was first published. Outside of the United States, "Choosin' Texas" topped the charts in Australia, Canada, Ireland, New Zealand, and the United Kingdom.

== Background ==
The song was created at a writing retreat in October 2024. Lambert told Langley some humorous stories from her younger years, including one in which she was pulled over with her pet kangaroo in the passenger seat and commented to the female officer that she had Texas license plates. From there, Langley came up with the phrase "She's from Texas, I can tell", which developed into the lyrics "She's from Texas, I can tell by the way he's two-steppin' 'round the room". In about 30 minutes, the song was composed.

Langley first performed the song live in February 2025, during a concert at Banita Creek Hall in Nacogdoches, Texas.

Langley has been rumored to be involved in a love triangle with country singers Riley Green and Megan Moroney, though all of them have denied it. Some pointed out that the cover art looked strikingly similar to a photograph taken by a fan of two people believed to be Green and Moroney driving in Alabama. However, it also includes a road sign reading "Welcome to Amarillo" and none of the three are from Texas, which is the focus of the song.

== Composition ==
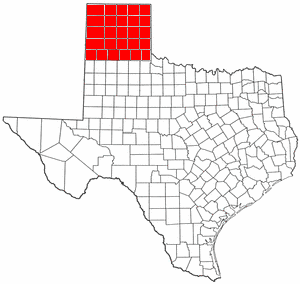
Some lyrics reference the Texas panhandle (pictured, red), including Interstate 40 (which also runs through Nashville, Tennessee) and the song "Amarillo By Morning" by Terry Stafford. The single cover includes a welcome sign for Amarillo, Texas.

Instrumentally, the song contains guitar, including steel guitar.

Lyrically, the song is about a lover who she believes is about to leave her for a Texas woman. In the first verse, she reflects on her initial belief that he was falling in love with her and Tennessee. Later on, she wrestles with her regret and accepts the truth as she realizes his heart has always belonged to Texas.

Langley recalls the signs that foreshadowed this fact earlier in their relationship, such as his love for the Terry Stafford song "Amarillo by Morning" (made famous by Texan artist George Strait). The song refers to "East Bound and Down", a track by Jerry Reed, who is from Georgia, and Ronnie Milsap's "Smoky Mountain Rain". In the chorus, she sings about the obvious signs she missed, saying it "doesn't take a crystal ball" to recognize these as signs that her lover's heart belongs to Texas.

The song contains mentions to several cultural touchstones of Americana and country music, including the Great Smoky Mountains, Hank Williams, and Smokey and the Bandit.

== Music video ==
The official music video for "Choosin' Texas" was released on April 1, 2026. Directed by Langley herself alongside Wales Toney and Caylee Robillard, it was filmed at the Stagecoach Ballroom in Fort Worth, Texas, and features Langley and her love interest visiting the bar, and Langley becoming increasingly concerned about whether he truly loves her. The video stars actor Luke Grimes as the love interest, Ava Philippe as "Texas", the song's co-writer Miranda Lambert as a performer at the bar, and Kaitlin Butts as a bar patron who warns Langley that her lover may be unfaithful. At the end of the video, Langley departs in a van with Lambert and her band which is bound for Tennessee, abandoning Grimes after sensing his lack of faithfulness. The video also features numerous cameo appearances from other Texas-based singers and musicians Wade Bowen, Mike Ryan, Casey Donahew, and Tanner Usrey as bar patrons, calf ropers and bull-riders J.B. Mauney, Dale Brisby, Shad Mayfield, Tyson Durfey, and Leighton Berry as cowboys, and Donahew's wife Melinda as the bartender.

== Critical reception ==
Caitlin Hall of Holler wrote "Sonically, 'Choosin' Texas' fits right into Langley's wheelhouse; upbeat, catchy, and full of that Southern grit she's become known for. It's got that modern Country Radio polish but still keeps its twang". She also stated "The melody swings like a line dance, effortlessly upbeat even while the lyrics sting. It's the kind of song you could cry to in the car or sing along with at a live show, the best kind of country contradiction". Jessica Nicholson of Billboard remarked, "The production, the rhythm, the message and Langley's unmistakable voice meld mightily to make this an irresistible track and further cement Langley as one of the genre's brightest newcomers". Hattie Lindert of Pitchfork called the song a contender for 2026 song of the summer, describing it as "a perfect ballad, lean and warm-blooded, the equivalent of good home cooking".

== Commercial performance ==
"Choosin' Texas" debuted at No. 39 on the Billboard Hot 100, Langley's highest debut at the time. On February 9, 2026, it peaked at No. 1, becoming her first top 10 entry and number one on the all-genre chart. She became the twelfth woman since 2000 to break the top five with a country song. The song also became her first number one on the Hot Country Songs chart and the Billboard Streaming Songs chart, and her third on the Country Airplay chart. It is also the first song by a female artist to simultaneously top all three of the Hot 100, Hot Country Songs, and Country Airplay charts. It became the longest-running No. 1 hit on the Billboard Hot 100 by a female country artist ever, and then surpassed Mariah Carey's "All I Want For Christmas Is You" to become the longest-reigning chart-topper in Hot 100 history.

The song also topped other all-genre, sales-and-streaming and genre-specific charts in other predominantly English-speaking countries: Australia, Canada, Ireland, New Zealand, and the United Kingdom. In the singles charts for Ireland and the United Kingdom, the song's rise to its peak position was lengthy and gradual. The song entered the top ten of the UK Singles Chart in its 25th week, making it to number one in its 35th week on the chart. In Ireland, "Choosin' Texas" hovered the bottom half of the top-50, quickly launching into the top-20 in its tenth week and to number ten the next. It reached number one in its fifteenth week, spending three weeks at the spot and 18 weeks in the top-ten overall.

== Charts ==
=== Weekly charts ===
Weekly chart performance
Chart (2025–2026)	Peak position
Australia (ARIA)	1
Australia Airplay (RCS)	4
Australia Country Hot 50 (The Music)	1
Belgium (Ultratop 50 Flanders)	5
Belgium (Ultratop 50 Wallonia)	34
Brazil Airplay (Top 100 Brasil)	67
Canada Hot 100 (Billboard)	1
Canada AC (Billboard)	5
Canada CHR/Top 40 (Billboard)	1
Canada Country (Billboard)	1
Canada Hot AC (Billboard)	9
Colombia Anglo Airplay (Monitor Latino)	2
CIS Airplay (TopHit)	118
Costa Rica Anglo Airplay (Monitor Latino)	9
Croatia International Airplay (Top lista)	30
Dominican Republic Anglo Airplay (Monitor Latino)	13
Estonia Airplay (TopHit)	43
Finland Airplay (Radiosoittolista)	24
France Airplay (SNEP)	14
Global 200 (Billboard)	2
Ireland (IRMA)	1
Italy Airplay (EarOne)	76
Japan Hot Overseas (Billboard Japan)	9
Latin America Anglo Airplay (Monitor Latino)	11
Mexico Anglo Airplay (Monitor Latino)	8
Netherlands (Dutch Top 40)	3
Netherlands (Single Top 100)	10
Netherlands Airplay (Dutch Charts)	1
New Zealand (Recorded Music NZ)	1
New Zealand Airplay (RCS)	7
Nicaragua Anglo Airplay (Monitor Latino)	4
North Macedonia Airplay (Radiomonitor)	15
Norway (VG-lista)	5
Norway Airplay (IFPI)	25
Peru Anglo Airplay (Monitor Latino)	8
Portugal Airplay (AFP)	15
Romania Airplay (TopHit)	179
Slovenia Airplay (Radiomonitor)	9
South Africa Airplay (TOSAC)	3
Spain Airplay (Promusicae)	12
Sweden (Sverigetopplistan)	11
Sweden Airplay (Radiomonitor)	9
Switzerland (Schweizer Hitparade)	25
Switzerland Airplay (MusicTrace)	13
UK Singles (Official Charts)	1
Uruguay Anglo Airplay (Monitor Latino)	7
US Billboard Hot 100	1
US Adult Contemporary (Billboard)	6
US Adult Pop Airplay (Billboard)	2
US Country Airplay (Billboard)	1
US Hot Country Songs (Billboard)	1
US Pop Airplay (Billboard)	6
Venezuela Anglo Airplay (Monitor Latino)	5

=== Monthly charts ===
Monthly chart performance
Chart (2026)	Peak position
Estonia Airplay (TopHit)	46

== Certifications ==
Certifications for "Choosin' Texas"
Region	Certification	Certified units/sales
Australia (ARIA)	4× Platinum	280,000^{‡}
Canada (Music Canada)	7× Platinum	560,000^{‡}
New Zealand (RMNZ)	3× Platinum	90,000^{‡}
Norway (IFPI Norway)	Platinum	60,000^{‡}
United Kingdom (BPI)	Platinum	600,000^{‡}
United States (RIAA)	7× Platinum	7,000,000^{‡}
Streaming
Sweden (GLF)	Gold	6,000,000^{†}
^{‡} Sales+streaming figures based on certification alone.^{†} Streaming-only figures based on certification alone.

== Release history ==
Release dates and formats for "Choosin' Texas"
Region	Date	Format(s)	Label(s)	Ref.
United States	November 10, 2025	Country radio	Triple Tigers; Columbia; Sawgod	
United States	February 3, 2026	Contemporary hit radio	Columbia	
Italy	March 27, 2026	Radio	Sony	

== Other versions ==
Waxahatchee and MJ Lenderman covered the song in 2026 on their joint tour.

In September 2026, Drake released the film Fear of Missing Out, where he previewed and indicated the remix with Don Toliver and Ella Langley. The remix, entitled "Solar Eclipse", was released to streaming services on October 2, 2026, without Langley.
