= Luke Combs discography =

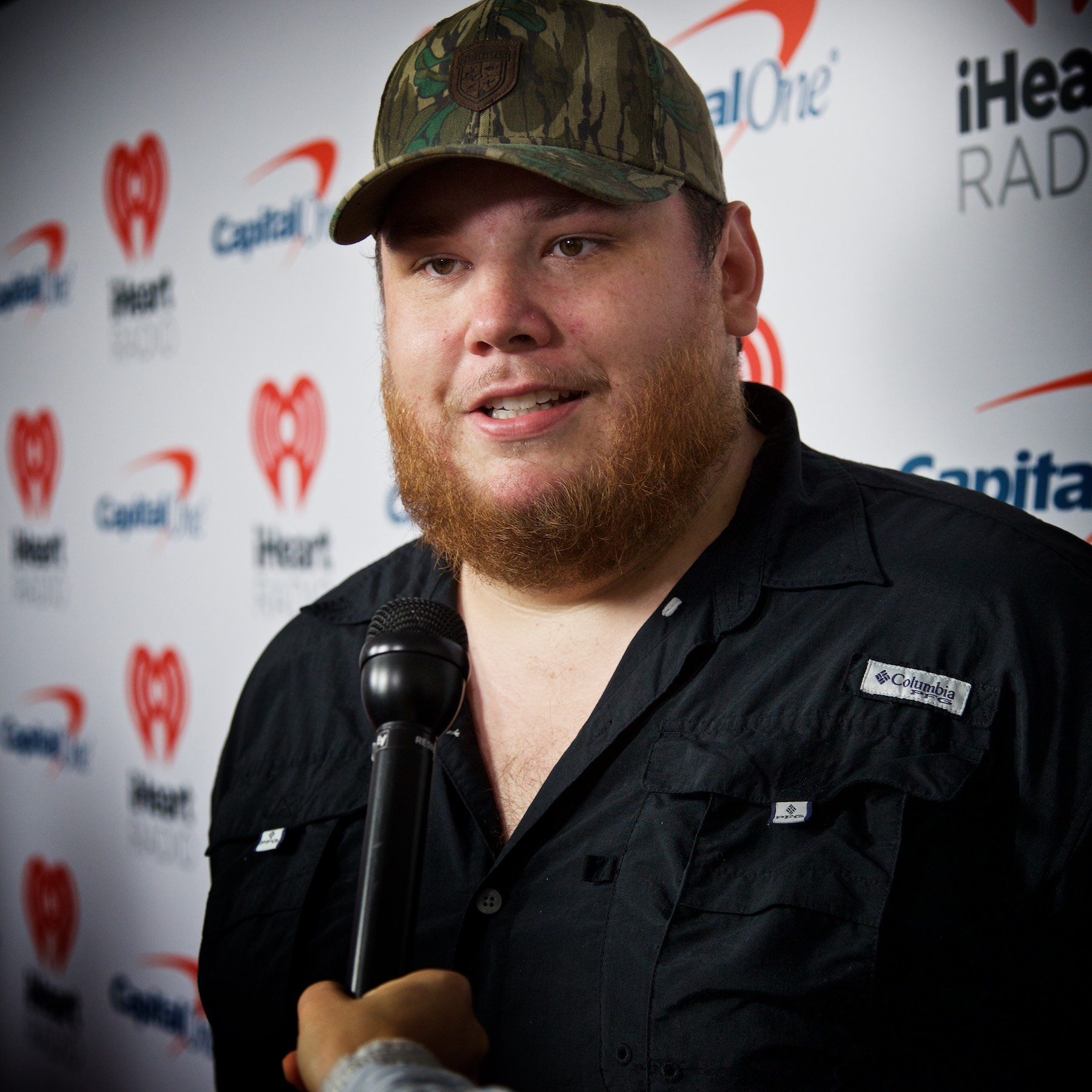
- Combs in 2019
- Studio albums: 6
- EPs: 4
- Singles: 20
- Music videos: 19
- Promotional singles: 1

American country music singer and songwriter Luke Combs has released six studio albums, four extended plays, and twenty singles. Of his twenty singles, sixteen have gone to number one on the Billboard Country Airplay chart.

He made his debut in 2016 with the song "Hurricane", the first of three singles from his debut album This One's for You. Also released from this album were "When It Rains It Pours" (his first to also top Hot Country Songs) and "One Number Away". The album was re-released in 2018 as This One's for You Too with additional tracks including the singles "She Got the Best of Me" and "Beautiful Crazy". The latter spent seven weeks at number one on Country Airplay and made This One's for You the first album to contain five number-one singles since that chart was first established in 1990. "Beautiful Crazy" is also Combs's highest-certified single, with a diamond certification from the Recording Industry Association of America (RIAA) for sales of ten million.

Combs's second studio album, 2019's What You See Is What You Get, accounted for five more singles including the Eric Church duet "Does to Me". In 2020, the album was released as What You See Ain't Always What You Get and accounted for two more singles including "Forever After All", which tied a record set by Luke Bryan's Kill the Lights for the most number-one singles off a country album. Additionally, "Forever After All" reached number two on the Billboard Hot 100.

In 2022, Combs released his third studio album Growin' Up. This was led off by the single "Doin' This" and followed by "The Kind of Love We Make", which peaked at number two on Country Airplay and ended a run of thirteen consecutive number-one singles on that chart, although it did reach the top of Hot Country Songs. After this album came 2023's Gettin' Old, which includes a cover of Tracy Chapman's "Fast Car". Combs's cover topped both Hot Country Songs and Country Airplay in addition to tying the number two peak of "Forever After All" on the Hot 100.

Combs also has a number of featured credits including Jameson Rodgers's "Cold Beer Calling My Name", a number-one single on Country Airplay in 2021. Additionally, he has charted four promotional singles and most of the tracks from his albums have reached the country music charts from downloads or unsolicited airplay.

== Studio albums ==
List of studio albums, with sales data, certifications, chart positions, and other selected details
Title	Album details	Peak chart positions										Sales	Certifications
Title	Album details	US	US Country	AUS	CAN	IRE	NOR	NZ	SWE	SWI	UK	Sales	Certifications
This One's for You (Note: This One's for You was reissued in June 2018 as This One's for You Too with bonus material; chart positions and sales figures are cumulative for both releases.)	Release date: June 2, 2017; Label: Columbia Nashville	4	1	5	10	11	25	22	43	—	32	US: 600,000	RIAA: 8× Platinum; ARIA: 3× Platinum; BPI: Platinum; MC: 7× Platinum; RMNZ: 4× Platinum
What You See Is What You Get (Note: What You See Is What You Get was reissued in October 2020 as What You See Ain't Always What You Get with bonus material; chart positions and sales figures are cumulative for both releases.)	Release date: November 8, 2019; Label: Columbia Nashville	1	1	1	1	21	—	24	—	96	27	US: 350,000; CAN: 3,000	RIAA: 5× Platinum; ARIA: 2× Platinum; BPI: Gold; MC: 6× Platinum; RMNZ: 2× Platinum
Growin' Up	Release date: June 24, 2022; Label: Columbia Nashville	2	1	2	2	36	33	9	—	53	9		RIAA: Platinum; ARIA: Gold; BPI: Gold; MC: 2× Platinum; RMNZ: Platinum
Gettin' Old	Released: March 24, 2023; Label: Columbia Nashville	4	2	2	2	6	6	2	33	64	5		RIAA: 2× Platinum; ARIA: Platinum; BPI: Gold; MC: 2× Platinum; RMNZ: 2× Platinum
Fathers & Sons	Released: June 14, 2024; Label: Columbia Nashville	6	2	3	6	13	12	5	23	56	14		BPI: Silver
The Way I Am	Released: March 20, 2026; Label: Columbia Nashville	2	1	3	2	8	10	4	46	—	4	US: 23,000	BPI: Silver; MC: 2× Platinum
"—" denotes releases that did not chart

== Extended plays ==
List of extended plays, with selected details, sales data, and chart positions
Title	Details	Peak chart positions				Sales
Title	Details	US	US Country	US Indie	CAN	Sales
The Way She Rides	Release date: February 4, 2014; Label: Luke Combs	—	—	—	—	
Can I Get an Outlaw	Release date: July 1, 2014; Label: Luke Combs	—	—	—	—	
This One's for You	Release date: November 27, 2015; Label: River House Artists, Columbia Nashville	150	24	29	—	US: 15,800
The Prequel	Release date: June 7, 2019; Label: Columbia Nashville	4	1	—	4	US: 42,200
"—" denotes releases that did not chart

== Singles ==
=== As lead artist ===
List of singles as lead artist, showing year released and album name, along with certifications, sales, and other selected information
Title	Year	Peak positions									Sales	Certifications	Album
Title	Year	US	US Country Songs	US Country Airplay	AUS	CAN	CAN Country	NZ Hot	UK	WW	Sales	Certifications	Album
"Hurricane"	2016	31	3	1	77	62	2	—	—	—	US: 670,000	RIAA: 12× Platinum; ARIA: 5× Platinum; BPI: Platinum; MC: 2× Platinum; RMNZ: 3× Platinum	This One's for You
"When It Rains It Pours"	2017	33	1	1	22	54	1	—	—	—	US: 459,000	RIAA: 13× Platinum; ARIA: 10× Platinum; BPI: Platinum; MC: 2× Platinum; RMNZ: 5× Platinum	This One's for You
"One Number Away"	2018	34	3	1	—	87	1	—	—	—	US: 316,000	RIAA: 6× Platinum; ARIA: 2× Platinum; MC: Platinum; BPI: Silver; RMNZ: Platinum	This One's for You
"Dive"	2018	—	—	—	—	—	—	—	—	—		RIAA: Platinum; RMNZ: Platinum	Non-album single
"She Got the Best of Me"	2018	31	2	1	59	52	1	—	—	—	US: 421,000	RIAA: Diamond; ARIA: 6× Platinum; BPI: Platinum; MC: Platinum; RMNZ: 3× Platinum	This One's for You Too
"Beautiful Crazy"	2018	21	1	1	32	35	1	—	—	—	US: 610,000	RIAA: 15× Platinum; ARIA: 9× Platinum; BPI: Platinum; MC: 3× Platinum; RMNZ: 4× Platinum	This One's for You Too
"Beer Never Broke My Heart"	2019	21	2	1	44	31	1	—	—	184	US: 350,000	RIAA: 8× Platinum; ARIA: 5× Platinum; BPI: Gold; MC: 4× Platinum; RMNZ: 2× Platinum	What You See Is What You Get
"Even Though I'm Leaving"	2019	11	2	1	—	30	1	—	—	—	US: 400,000	RIAA: 5× Platinum; ARIA: 2× Platinum; BPI: Silver; MC: 2× Platinum; RMNZ: Platinum	What You See Is What You Get
"Does to Me" (featuring Eric Church)	2020	20	4	1	—	38	1	38	—	—	US: 200,000	RIAA: 3× Platinum; ARIA: Platinum; MC: 2× Platinum; RMNZ: Gold	What You See Is What You Get
"Lovin' on You"	2020	23	3	1	—	48	1	—	—	174		RIAA: 3× Platinum; ARIA: Platinum; BPI: Silver; MC: 2× Platinum; RMNZ: Gold	What You See Is What You Get
"Better Together"	2020	15	1	1	—	29	1	—	—	87	US: 100,000	RIAA: 5× Platinum; ARIA: 2× Platinum; BPI: Silver; MC: 2× Platinum; RMNZ: Platinum	What You See Is What You Get
"Forever After All"	2021	2	1	1	14	3	1	4	—	4		RIAA: 8× Platinum; ARIA: 3× Platinum; BPI: Platinum; MC: Platinum; RMNZ: 2× Platinum	What You See Ain't Always What You Get
"Cold as You"	2021	32	5	1	—	46	1	—	—	190		RIAA: Platinum; ARIA: Gold; RMNZ: Gold	What You See Ain't Always What You Get
"Doin' This"	2021	26	2	1	79	27	2	28	—	122		RIAA: 2× Platinum; ARIA: Platinum; BPI: Silver; RMNZ: Gold	Growin' Up
"The Kind of Love We Make"	2022	8	1	2	17	13	1	6	72	38		RIAA: 6× Platinum; ARIA: 6× Platinum; BPI: Platinum; RMNZ: 3× Platinum	Growin' Up
"Going, Going, Gone"	2022	23	5	1	—	32	1	—	—	144		RIAA: 3× Platinum; ARIA: Gold; BPI: Silver; RMNZ: Platinum	Growin' Up
"Love You Anyway"	2023	15	3	1	28	13	1	3	62	31		RIAA: 3× Platinum; ARIA: Gold; BPI: Silver; MC: Platinum; RMNZ: Platinum	Gettin' Old
"Fast Car"	2023	2	1	1	2	2	1	2	30	18		RIAA: 8× Platinum; ARIA: 6× Platinum; BPI: Platinum; MC: 7× Platinum; RMNZ: 4× Platinum	Gettin' Old
"Where the Wild Things Are"	2023	26	4	3	24	26	1	13	37	108		RIAA: 4× Platinum; ARIA: 2× Platinum; BPI: Platinum; MC: Platinum; RMNZ: 2× Platinum	Gettin' Old
"Ain't No Love in Oklahoma"	2024	13	3	1	19	13	1	5	50	35		RIAA: 3× Platinum; ARIA: 2× Platinum; BPI: Gold; RMNZ: 2× Platinum	Twisters: The Album
"Back in the Saddle"	2025	22	4	1	72	31	1	4	—	179			The Way I Am
"Days Like These"	2025	31	9	2	—	31	1	6	—	—		MC: Platinum	The Way I Am
"Sleepless in a Hotel Room"	2026	11	2	1	19	14	1	—	—	64		MC: 2× Platinum; RMNZ: Gold	The Way I Am
"Be By You"	2026	12	2	1	33	17	1	1	47	36		MC: 2× Platinum	The Way I Am
"Rethink Some Things"	2026	29	10	5	—	39	2	6	—	168		MC: Gold	The Way I Am
"—" denotes releases that did not chart

=== As featured artist ===
List of singles as featured artist, showing year released and album name, along with certifications
Title	Year	Peak chart positions							Certifications	Album
Title	Year	US	US Country Songs	US Country Airplay	AUS	CAN	CAN Country	WW	Certifications	Album
"Brand New Man" (Brooks & Dunn featuring Luke Combs)	2019	—	30	42	—	—	40	—	ARIA: Platinum; MC: Gold	Reboot
"Cold Beer Calling My Name" (Jameson Rodgers featuring Luke Combs)	2020	26	3	1	—	62	6	—	RIAA: 2× Platinum; ARIA: Gold	Bet You're from a Small Town
"Different 'Round Here" (Riley Green featuring Luke Combs)	2023	60	15	2	—	89	11	—	RMNZ: Gold	Ain't My Last Rodeo
"Life Goes On" (Ed Sheeran featuring Luke Combs)	2023	66	47	59	23	27	—	95	ARIA: Platinum	−
"Guy for That" (Post Malone featuring Luke Combs)	2024	17	7	5	18	14	50	22	BPI: Gold; RMNZ: Platinum	F-1 Trillion
"Backup Plan" (Bailey Zimmerman featuring Luke Combs)	2025	30	6	2	—	29	1	139	RIAA: Platinum; ARIA: Gold; MC: Platinum; RMNZ: Gold	Different Night Same Rodeo
"Finders Keepers" (Luke Bryan featuring Luke Combs)	2026	83	30	26	—	—	49	—		Signs
"—" denotes releases that did not chart

=== Promotional singles ===
List of promotional radio singles, showing year released, album name, and chart positions
Title	Year	Peak positions									Certification	Album
Title	Year	US	US Country Songs	US Country Airplay	AUS	CAN	CAN Country	NZ Hot	UK	WW	Certification	Album
"Six Feet Apart"	2020	58	10	36	77	36	19	—	—	—	RIAA: Platinum; ARIA: Platinum; MC: Platinum	What You See Ain't Always What You Get
"Tomorrow Me"	2022	61	13	—	—	58	—	—	—	150	RIAA: Platinum; ARIA: Gold	Growin' Up
"Growin' Up and Gettin' Old"	2023	54	18	58	50	40	—	6	—	160	RIAA: Platinum; RMNZ: Gold	Gettin' Old
"5 Leaf Clover"	2023	33	11	35	32	29	—	6	83	85	BPI: Silver; RIAA: Gold; RMNZ: Gold	Gettin' Old
"The Man He Sees in Me"	2024	39	13	—	38	33	56	9	—	103	RIAA: Gold	Fathers & Sons
"Ordinary" (live from Lollapalooza) (with Alex Warren)	2025	—	39	—	—	—	—	7	—	—		Non-album promotional single
"My Kinda Saturday Night"	2025	—	47	—	—	89	—	9	—	—		The Way I Am
"15 Minutes"	2025	—	46	—	—	—	—	14	—	—		The Way I Am
"Giving Her Away"	2025	— (Note: "Giving Her Away" did not enter the Billboard Hot 100, but peaked at number 4 on the Bubbling Under Hot 100 chart.)	26	—	—	73	—	4	—	—		The Way I Am
"I Ain't No Cowboy"	2026	90	29	—	—	72	—	5	—	—		The Way I Am
"—" denotes releases that did not chart

== Other charted and certified songs ==
List of other charted or certified songs, showing year released and album name, along with chart positions
Title	Year	Peak chart positions						Sales	Certification	Album
Title	Year	US	US Country Songs	US Country Airplay	CAN	NZ Hot	WW	Sales	Certification	Album
"Outlaw" (Upchurch featuring Luke Combs)	2016	—	—	—	—	—	—		RIAA: Platinum	Heart of America
"Out There"	2017	—	—	—	—	—	—		RIAA: Gold; ARIA: Gold	This One's for You
"Memories Are Made Of"	2017	—	—	—	—	—	—		RIAA: Gold; ARIA: Gold	This One's for You
"Lonely One"	2017	—	—	—	—	—	—		RIAA: Gold; ARIA: Gold	This One's for You
"Beer Can"	2017	—	—	—	—	—	—		RIAA: Platinum	This One's for You
"Don't Tempt Me"	2017	—	—	—	—	—	—		RIAA: Gold; ARIA: Gold	This One's for You
"Be Careful What You Wish For"	2017	—	—	—	—	—	—		RIAA: Gold; ARIA: Gold	This One's for You
"I Got Away with You"	2017	—	—	—	—	—	—		RIAA: Platinum; ARIA: Gold	This One's for You
"Must've Never Met You"	2018	81	14	—	—	—	—	US: 34,000	RIAA: 3× Platinum; ARIA: Platinum; RMNZ: Gold	This One's for You Too
"Houston, We Got a Problem"	2018	— (Note: "Houston, We Got a Problem" did not enter the Billboard Hot 100, but peaked at number five on the Bubbling Under Hot 100 chart.)	22	58	—	—	—	US: 23,000	RIAA: 3× Platinum; ARIA: Platinum; RMNZ: Gold	This One's for You Too
"A Long Way"	2018	—	33	—	—	—	—	US: 13,000	RIAA: Gold; ARIA: Gold	This One's for You Too
"Honky Tonk Highway"	2018	—	—	—	—	—	—		RIAA: Gold; ARIA: Gold	This One's for You
"This One's for You"	2018	—	—	—	—	—	—		RIAA: Gold; ARIA: Gold	This One's for You
"Refrigerator Door"	2019	— (Note: "Refrigerator Door" did not enter the Billboard Hot 100, but peaked at number four on the Bubbling Under Hot 100 chart.)	20	—	—	—	—		RIAA: Platinum; ARIA: Platinum; MC: Gold	What You See Is What You Get
"Moon Over Mexico"	2019	— (Note: "Moon Over Mexico" did not enter the Billboard Hot 100, but peaked at number five on the Bubbling Under Hot 100 chart.)	21	—	—	—	—		RIAA: Platinum; ARIA: Platinum; MC: Gold	What You See Is What You Get
"1, 2 Many" (with Brooks & Dunn)	2019	97	20	—	73	—	—	US: 25,000	RIAA: 2× Platinum; ARIA: 2× Platinum; BPI: Silver; MC: Platinum; RMNZ: Platinum	What You See Is What You Get
"Blue Collar Boys"	2019	—	42	—	—	—	—		RIAA: Gold; ARIA: Gold	What You See Is What You Get
"New Every Day"	2019	—	45	—	—	—	—		RIAA: Gold	What You See Is What You Get
"Reasons"	2019	—	39	—	—	—	—		RIAA: Gold; ARIA: Gold; MC: Gold	What You See Is What You Get
"Every Little Bit Helps"	2019	—	47	—	—	—	—		RIAA: Gold; ARIA: Gold	What You See Is What You Get
"Dear Today"	2019	—	43	—	—	—	—		RIAA: Gold; ARIA: Gold	What You See Is What You Get
"What You See Is What You Get"	2019	— (Note: "What You See Is What You Get" did not enter the Billboard Hot 100, but peaked at number 18 on the Bubbling Under Hot 100 chart.)	30	—	—	—	—		RIAA: Platinum; ARIA: Gold; MC: Gold	What You See Is What You Get
"Angels Workin' Overtime"	2019	—	49	—	—	—	—			What You See Is What You Get
"All Over Again"	2019	—	38	—	—	—	—		RIAA: Gold; ARIA: Gold	What You See Is What You Get
"Nothing Like You"	2019	—	41	—	—	—	—		RIAA: Gold; ARIA: Gold; MC: Gold	What You See Is What You Get
"Without You" (featuring Amanda Shires)	2020	70	15	—	70	—	119		RIAA: Gold; ARIA: Gold	What You See Ain't Always What You Get
"The Other Guy"	2020	69	19	—	80	—	138		RIAA: Gold	What You See Ain't Always What You Get
"My Kinda Folk"	2020	— (Note: "My Kinda Folk" did not enter the Billboard Hot 100, but peaked at number one on the Bubbling Under Hot 100 chart.)	27	—	—	—	—			What You See Ain't Always What You Get
"Any Given Friday Night"	2022	—	38	—	86	38	—			Growin' Up
"On the Other Line"	2022	—	42	—	—	39	—			Growin' Up
"Outrunnin' Your Memory" (with Miranda Lambert)	2022	— (Note: "Outrunnin' Your Memory" did not enter the Billboard Hot 100, but peaked at number seven on the Bubbling Under Hot 100 chart.)	27	—	50	25	—		RIAA: Gold	Growin' Up
"Used to Wish I Was"	2022	—	44	—	—	—	—			Growin' Up
"Better Back When"	2022	—	47	—	—	—	—			Growin' Up
"Call Me"	2022	—	49	—	—	—	—			Growin' Up
"Middle of Somewhere"	2022	—	45	—	—	—	—			Growin' Up
"Hannah Ford Road"	2023	— (Note: "Hannah Ford Road" did not enter the Billboard Hot 100, but peaked at number 14 on the Bubbling Under Hot 100 chart.)	50	59	81	11	—			Gettin' Old
"You Found Yours"	2023	— (Note: "You Found Yours" did not enter the Billboard Hot 100, but peaked at number seven on the Bubbling Under Hot 100 chart.)	40	—	68	9	—		RIAA: Gold	Gettin' Old
"See Me Now"	2023	— (Note: "See Me Now" did not enter the Billboard Hot 100, but peaked at number 24 on the Bubbling Under Hot 100 chart.)	—	—	97	—	—			Gettin' Old
"Still"	2023	— (Note: "Still" did not enter the Billboard Hot 100, but peaked at number 25 on the Bubbling Under Hot 100 chart.)	—	57	79	—	—			Gettin' Old
"Joe"	2023	89	22	—	62	16	—			Gettin' Old
"Front Door Famous"	2024	95	28	—	91	10	—			Fathers & Sons
"In Case I Ain't Around"	2024	— (Note: "In Case I Ain't Around" did not enter the Billboard Hot 100, but peaked at number 7 on the Bubbling Under Hot 100 chart.)	33	—	—	13	—			Fathers & Sons
"Huntin' by Yourself"	2024	— (Note: "Huntin' by Yourself" did not enter the Billboard Hot 100, but peaked at number 2 on the Bubbling Under Hot 100 chart.)	31	—	—	12	—			Fathers & Sons
"Little Country Boys"	2024	— (Note: "Little Country Boys" did not enter the Billboard Hot 100, but peaked at number 22 on the Bubbling Under Hot 100 chart.)	39	—	—	—	—			Fathers & Sons
"Whoever You Turn Out to Be"	2024	—	44	—	—	—	—			Fathers & Sons
"Remember Him That Way"	2024	35	12	—	45	5	102		RIAA: Gold	Fathers & Sons
"Missin' You Like This" (Post Malone featuring Luke Combs)	2024	63	27	—	—	—	—			F-1 Trillion
"Alcohol of Fame"	2026	—	46	—	84	—	—			The Way I Am
"Daytona 499"	2026	— (Note: "Daytona 499" did not enter the Billboard Hot 100, but peaked at number 13 on the Bubbling Under Hot 100 chart.)	39	—	—	13	—			The Way I Am
"The Way I Am"	2026	— (Note: "The Way I Am" did not enter the Billboard Hot 100, but peaked at number 24 on the Bubbling Under Hot 100 chart.)	45	—	—	—	—			The Way I Am
"Wish Upon a Whiskey"	2026	— (Note: "Wish Upon a Whiskey" did not enter the Billboard Hot 100, but peaked at number 5 on the Bubbling Under Hot 100 chart.)	34	—	88	11	—			The Way I Am
"Soon as I Get Home"	2026	— (Note: "Soon as I Get Home" did not enter the Billboard Hot 100, but peaked at number 9 on the Bubbling Under Hot 100 chart.)	36	—	99	—	—			The Way I Am
"Miss You Here"	2026	—	48	—	—	—	—			The Way I Am
"—" denotes releases that did not chart

== Music videos ==
List of music videos, with year released and directorial information
Year	Title	Director
2014	"Let the Moonshine"	Katharine Roman
2016	"Hurricane"	Tyler Adams
2017	"When It Rains It Pours"	Tyler Adams
2018	"One Number Away"	Tyler Adams
2018	"Beautiful Crazy"	Tyler Adams
2018	"She Got the Best of Me"	Tyler Adams
2018	"Houston, We Got a Problem"	Unlisted
2019	"Brand New Man" (with Brooks & Dunn)	Marty Callner
2019	"Beer Never Broke My Heart"	Tyler Adams
2019	"Ramblin' Man"	Unlisted
2019	"Refrigerator Door"	Unlisted
2019	"Lovin' on You"	Tyler Adams
2019	"Moon Over Mexico"	Unlisted
2019	"Even Though I'm Leaving"	Zack Massey
2019	"1, 2 Many" (with Brooks & Dunn)	Unlisted
2020	"Does to Me" (with Eric Church)	Jon Small and Trey Fanjoy
2020	"Lovin' on You"	Tyler Adams
2021	"Forever After All"	Tyler Adams
2021	"Cold as You"	TA Films
2022	"Going, Going, Gone"	Tyler Adams & Nicholas Bertram
2023	"Fast Car"	Zack Massey
2024	"Ain’t No Love In Oklahoma"	Alex Bittan
2024	"The Man He Sees in Me"	Zack Massey
2025	"Back in the Saddle"	Tyler Adams
