= My Kinda Saturday Night Tour =

2026 concert tour by Luke Combs

- Tour by Luke Combs
- Location: Europe; North America
- Associated album: The Way I Am
- Start date: March 21, 2026
- End date: June 26, 2027
- Legs: 3
- No. of shows: 35

Luke Combs concert chronology
- Growin' Up and Gettin' Old Tour (2024); My Kinda Saturday Night Tour (2026)

The My Kinda Saturday Night Tour is the sixth headlining concert tour by American country music artist Luke Combs and is in support of his sixth studio album The Way I Am (2026). It began on March 21, 2026, in Paradise, Nevada at Allegiant Stadium and will conclude on June 27, 2027, in San Diego, California at Petco Park.

== Background ==
Combs announced the tour in October 2025. On August 13, 2026, Combs announced twelve additional dates for 2027.

== Opening acts ==
- Avery Anna
- Dierks Bentley
- The Castellows
- Wyatt McCubbin
- Ty Myers
- Thomas Rhett
- The Script
- Shenandoah
- The Teskey Brothers
- Treaty Oak Revival
- Thelma & James
- Jake Worthington

== Setlist ==
The following setlist is from the March 21, 2026, concert in Paradise, Nevada. It is not intended to represent all dates.

1. "My Kinda Saturday Night"
2. "Lovin' on You"
3. "Hurricane"
4. "She Got the Best of Me"
5. "Tell 'Em About Tonight"
6. "One Number Away"
7. "Going, Going, Gone"
8. "Back in the Saddle"
9. "Must've Never Met You"
10. "The Kind of Love We Make"
11. "Sleepless in a Hotel Room"
12. "Rethink Some Things"
13. "Forever After All"
14. "Better Together"
15. "I Ain't No Cowboy"
16. "Even Though I'm Leaving"
17. "Remember Him That Way"
18. "Be By You"
19. "Beautiful Crazy"
20. "Crazy Train" / "She Will Be Loved" / "Billie Jean" / "I Don't Wanna Miss a Thing" / "Something Like That"
21. "Ordinary"
22. "Cold As You"
23. "When It Rains It Pours"
24. "1, 2 Many"
25. "Beer Never Broke My Heart"
26. "Fast Car"
27. "Where the Wild Things Are"
28. "Ain't No Love in Oklahoma"

== Tour dates ==
North American Leg 1
| Date | City | Country | Venue | Opening acts |
|---|---|---|---|---|
| March 21, 2026 | Paradise | United States | Allegiant Stadium | Dierks Bentley; Ty Myers; Thelma & James |
| April 4, 2026 | Charlottesville | United States | Scott Stadium | Dierks Bentley; Ty Myers; Thelema & James; Jake Worthington |
| April 11, 2026 | Ames | United States | Jack Trice Stadium | Dierks Bentley; Ty Myers; Thelema & James; Jake Worthington |
| April 18, 2026 | Notre Dame | United States | Notre Dame Stadium | Dierks Bentley; Ty Myers; Thelema & James; Jake Worthington |
| April 25, 2026 | Columbus | United States | Ohio Stadium | Dierks Bentley; Ty Myers; Thelema & James; Jake Worthington |
| May 2, 2026 | Knoxville | United States | Neyland Stadium | Dierks Bentley; Ty Myers; Thelema & James; Jake Worthington |
| May 9, 2026 | Norman | United States | Gaylord Family Oklahoma Memorial Stadium | Dierks Bentley; Ty Myers; Thelema & James; Jake Worthington |
| May 15, 2026 | Green Bay | United States | Lambeau Field | Dierks Bentley; Ty Myers; Thelema & James; Jake Worthington |
| May 16, 2026 | Green Bay | United States | Lambeau Field | Dierks Bentley; Ty Myers; Thelema & James; Jake Worthington |
| May 29, 2026 | Montreal | Canada | Jean-Drapeau Park | Dierks Bentley; Ty Myers; Thelema & James; Jake Worthington |
| May 30, 2026 | Montreal | Canada | Jean-Drapeau Park | Dierks Bentley; Ty Myers; Thelema & James; Jake Worthington |
| June 5, 2026 | Toronto | Canada | Rogers Stadium | Dierks Bentley; Ty Myers; Thelema & James; Jake Worthington |
| June 6, 2026 | Toronto | Canada | Rogers Stadium | Dierks Bentley; Ty Myers; Thelema & James; Jake Worthington |
Europe
| July 4, 2026 | Gothenburg | Sweden | Ullevi | The Script; Ty Myers; The Castellows |
| July 7, 2026 | Paris | France | Accor Arena | Ty Myers; The Castellows |
| July 11, 2026 | Amsterdam | Netherlands | Johan Cruyff Arena | The Script; Ty Myers; The Castellows |
| July 18, 2026 (Note: The show on July 18, 2026, was a part of Slane Festival) | Slane | Ireland | Slane Castle | The Script; Ty Myers; The Castellows |
| July 19, 2026 (Note: The show on July 19, 2026, was a part of Slane Festival) | Slane | Ireland | Slane Castle | The Script; Ty Myers; The Castellows |
| July 24, 2026 | Edinburgh | Scotland | Murrayfield Stadium | Ty Myers; The Castellows; The Teskey Brothers |
| July 25, 2026 | Edinburgh | Scotland | Murrayfield Stadium | Ty Myers; The Castellows; The Teskey Brothers |
| July 31, 2026 | London | England | Wembley Stadium | Thomas Rhett; Ty Myers; The Castellows |
| August 1, 2026 | London | England | Wembley Stadium | Thomas Rhett; Ty Myers; The Castellows |
| August 2, 2026 | London | England | Wembley Stadium | Thomas Rhett; Ty Myers; The Castellows |
North American Leg 2
| April 3, 2027 | Arlington | United States | AT&T Stadium | Treaty Oak Revival; Avery Anna; Shenandoah; Wyatt McCubbin |
| April 10, 2027 | Minneapolis | United States | U.S. Bank Stadium | Treaty Oak Revival; Avery Anna; Shenandoah; Wyatt McCubbin |
| April 17, 2027 | Detroit | United States | Ford Field | Treaty Oak Revival; Avery Anna; Shenandoah; Wyatt McCubbin |
| April 24, 2027 | Philadelphia | United States | Lincoln Financial Field | Treaty Oak Revival; Avery Anna; Shenandoah; Wyatt McCubbin |
| May 1, 2027 | Foxborough | United States | Gillette Stadium | Treaty Oak Revival; Avery Anna; Shenandoah; Wyatt McCubbin |
| May 8, 2027 | Pittsburgh | United States | Acrisure Stadium | Treaty Oak Revival; Avery Anna; Shenandoah; Wyatt McCubbin |
| May 15, 2026 | Kansas City | United States | Arrowhead Stadium | Treaty Oak Revival; Avery Anna; Shenandoah; Wyatt McCubbin |
| May 29, 2027 | Edmonton | Canada | Commonwealth Stadium | Treaty Oak Revival; Avery Anna; Shenandoah; Wyatt McCubbin |
| June 5, 2027 | Vancouver | Canada | BC Place | Treaty Oak Revival; Avery Anna; Shenandoah; Wyatt McCubbin |
| June 12, 2026 | Boise | United States | Albertsons Stadium | Treaty Oak Revival; Avery Anna; Shenandoah; Wyatt McCubbin |
| June 19, 2027 | Denver | United States | Empower Field at Mile High | Treaty Oak Revival; Avery Anna; Shenandoah; Wyatt McCubbin |
| June 26, 2027 | San Diego | United States | Petco Park | Treaty Oak Revival; Avery Anna; Shenandoah; Wyatt McCubbin |
