= I Ain't No Cowboy =

2026 song by Luke Combs

Promotional single by Luke Combs

from the album The Way I Am
- Released: March 13, 2026
- Genre: Country
- Length: 3:13
- Label: Sony; Seven Ridges
- Songwriters: Luke Combs; Cody Johnson; Jake Mears
- Producers: Luke Combs; Jonathan Singleton; Chip Matthews

"I Ain't No Cowboy" is a song by American country music singer Luke Combs, released on March 13, 2026, as a promotional single from his sixth studio album, The Way I Am. Combs co-wrote the song alongside Cody Johnson and Jake Mears and co-produced the song alongside Jonathan Singleton and Chip Matthews.

== Background ==
Combs initially teased the song on March 3, 2026, alongside "Wish Upon a Whiskey", another song from his sixth studio album, The Way I Am. "I Ain't No Cowboy" is the eighth release from the album, following "Back in the Saddle", "My Kinda Saturday Night", "Giving Her Away", "15 Minutes", "Days Like These", "Sleepless in a Hotel Room", and "Be By You".

"I Ain't No Cowboy" was co-written by Combs alongside Jake Mears and fellow country artist Cody Johnson. The trio wrote the song while Combs and Johnson were on tour in Australia in August 2023.

Casey Young of Whiskey Riff described the song as "a heartbreaker that finds Combs reflecting on a girl who left him in the dust."

== Commercial performance and reception ==
Upon release, "I Ain't No Cowboy" debuted atop the iTunes Top Songs chart. The song replaced Ella Langley's "Choosin' Texas".

Melinda Newman and Jessica Nicholson of Billboard ranked the song as the ninth best from The Way I Am.

== Personnel ==
Credits adapted from Tidal.

=== Musicians ===
- Luke Combs – lead vocals
- Todd Lombardo – acoustic guitar
- Chip Matthews – background vocals, percussion
- Jonathan Singleton – background vocals
- Rob McNelley – baritone guitar, electric guitar
- Steve Mackey – bass
- Jerry Roe – drums
- Jim "Moose" Brown – organ, piano

=== Technical ===
- Luke Combs – production
- Chip Matthews – production, editing, mixing, additional engineer
- Jonathan Singleton – production
- Chris Vanoverberghe – assistant recording
- Michael Proctor – editing
- Steve Blackmon – editing, recording
- Benny Quinn – mastering

== Charts ==
Chart performance for "I Ain't No Cowboy"
Chart (2026)	Peak position
Canada Hot 100 (Billboard)	72
New Zealand Hot Singles (RMNZ)	5
UK Singles Sales (OCC)	29
US Billboard Hot 100	90
US Hot Country Songs (Billboard)	29
