= List of Billboard number-one country songs of 2026 =

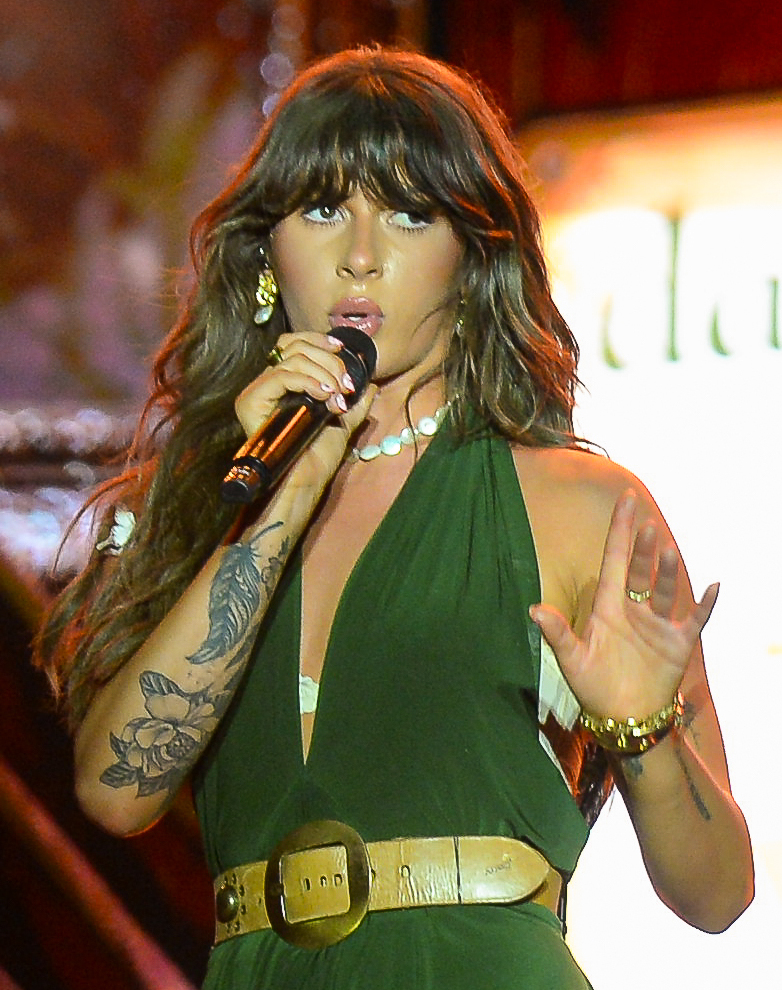
Ella Langley's "Choosin' Texas" has dominated both the Hot Country Songs chart and the Billboard Hot 100 in 2026.

Hot Country Songs and Country Airplay are charts that rank the top-performing country songs in the United States, published by Billboard magazine. Hot Country Songs ranks songs based on digital downloads, streaming, and airplay from radio stations of all formats, a methodology introduced in 2012. Country Airplay, which was first published in 2012, is based solely on country radio airplay, a methodology that had previously been used from 1990 to 2012 for Hot Country Songs.

In the issue of Billboard dated January 3, "Choosin' Texas" by Ella Langley was at number one on Hot Country Songs and "Cowgirl" by the band Parmalee topped Country Airplay, both songs retaining the position from the previous week. In the issue dated February 14, "Choosin' Texas" was at number one on both charts and also topped Billboard's overall singles chart, the Hot 100, the first time a female artist had simultaneously topped all three listings. In April, it broke the record for the longest-running number-one country song by a female artist on the Hot 100, and in June it broke the record for the longest-running Hot Country Songs number one by a solo female singer when it spent its 28th week in the top spot. A week later, it was displaced from the number-one position on the country chart by "I Knew It, I Knew You" by Taylor Swift, but it returned to the top spot dated July 4 and remains number one as of the chart dated November 21, taking its total to 49 weeks atop the listing. In late September, the song set a new record for the longest-running Hot 100 number one of all time.

Blake Shelton reached number one on Country Airplay in the issue dated January 17 with "Stay Country or Die Tryin'". It was his 30th number one based on country radio plays, surpassing Tim McGraw for the second highest career total, behind only Kenny Chesney's 33. Chesney further extended his record in October when "Carry On" became his 34th number one. Two other singers achieved their 20th Country Airplay number ones early in the year. In February, Morgan Wallen gained his 20th chart-topper with "20 Cigarettes". Luke Combs reached the same career milestone six weeks later with "Sleepless in a Hotel Room"; the song spent five weeks at number one, the longest chart-topping run of the year so far on the listing. Justin Moore set a new record for the longest climb to number one on Country Airplay in April when "Time's Ticking" reached the top spot in its 67th week on the chart. As of the chart dated November 21, Langley and Wallen are tied for the most Country Airplay number ones in 2026, having topped the listing with three solo songs each, as well as a joint number one in "I Can't Love You Anymore". Langley has the most weeks at number one on that chart, having spent 12 weeks in the top spot.

== Chart history ==
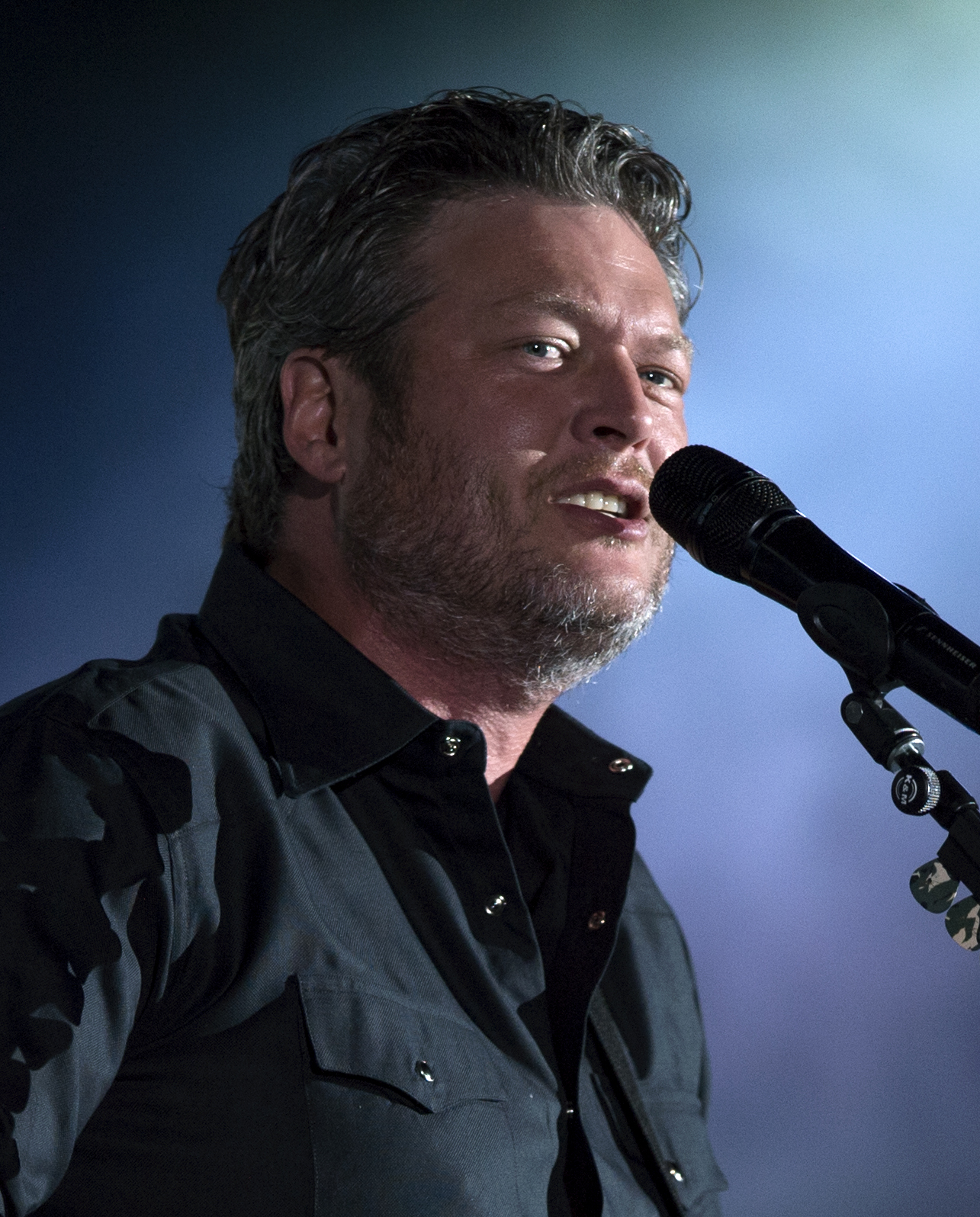
Blake Shelton achieved his 30th airplay number one in January.

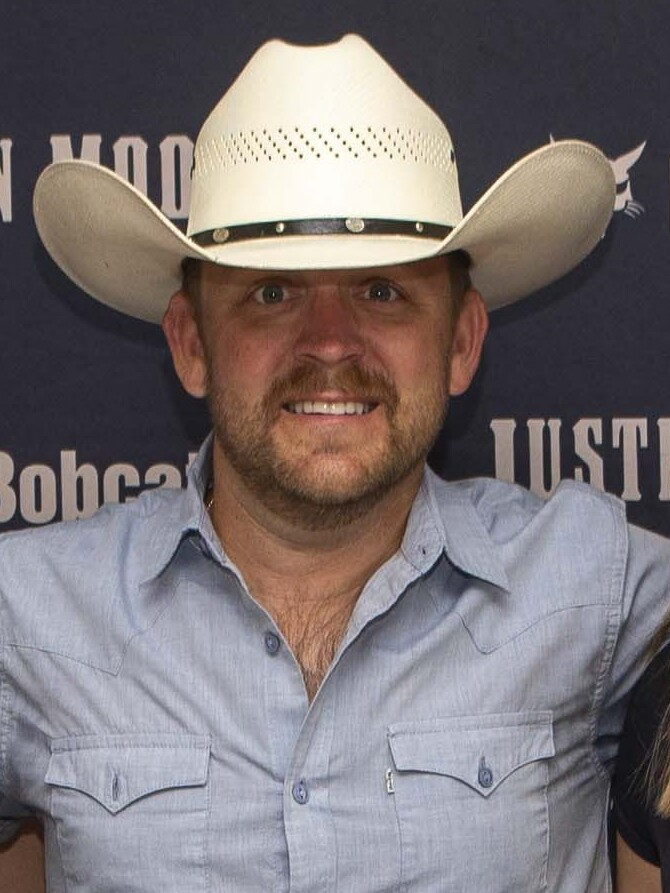
In April, Justin Moore set a new record for the longest climb to number one on Country Airplay when "Time's Ticking" reached number one in its 67th week on the chart.

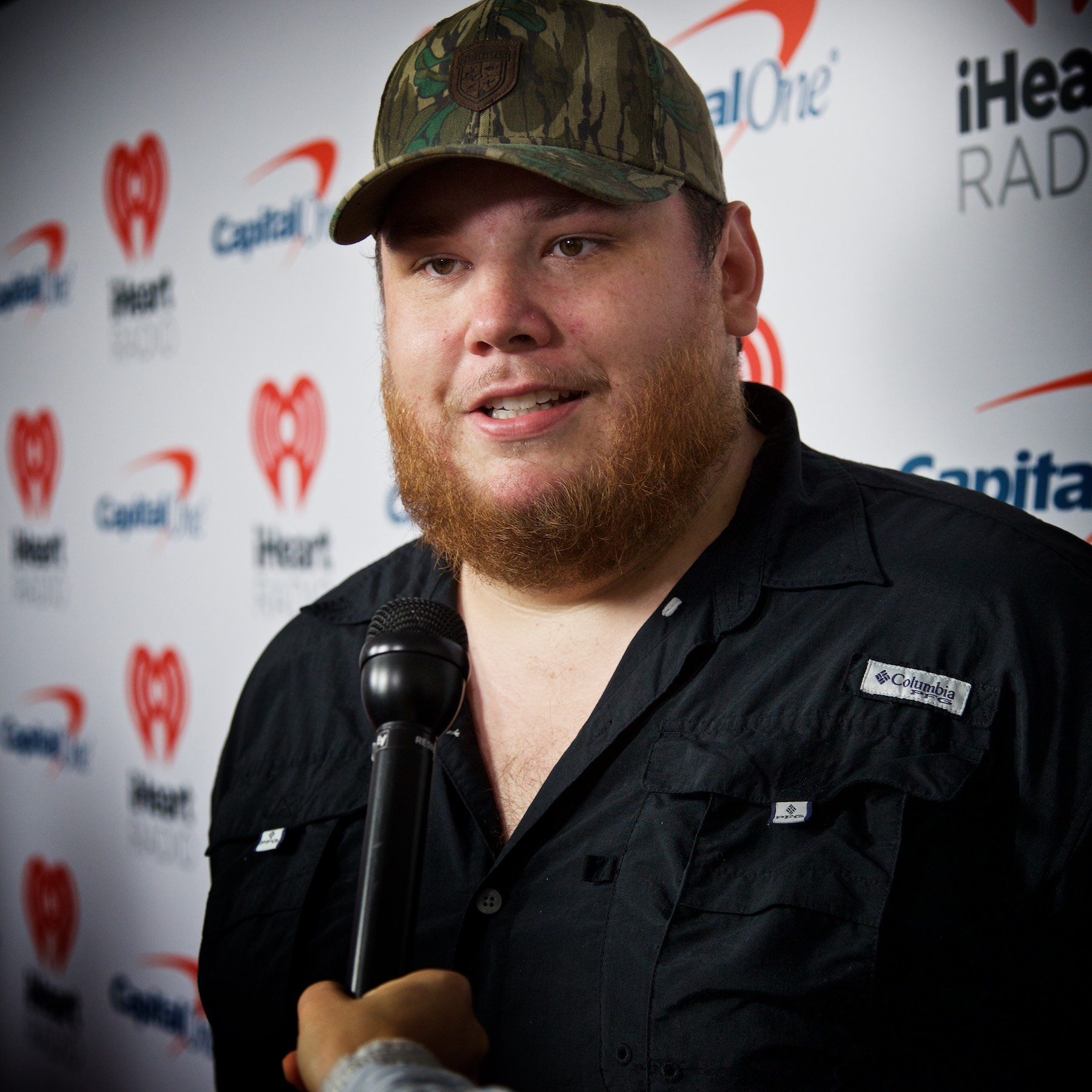
Luke Combs spent five consecutive weeks atop the airplay chart with "Sleepless in a Hotel Room".

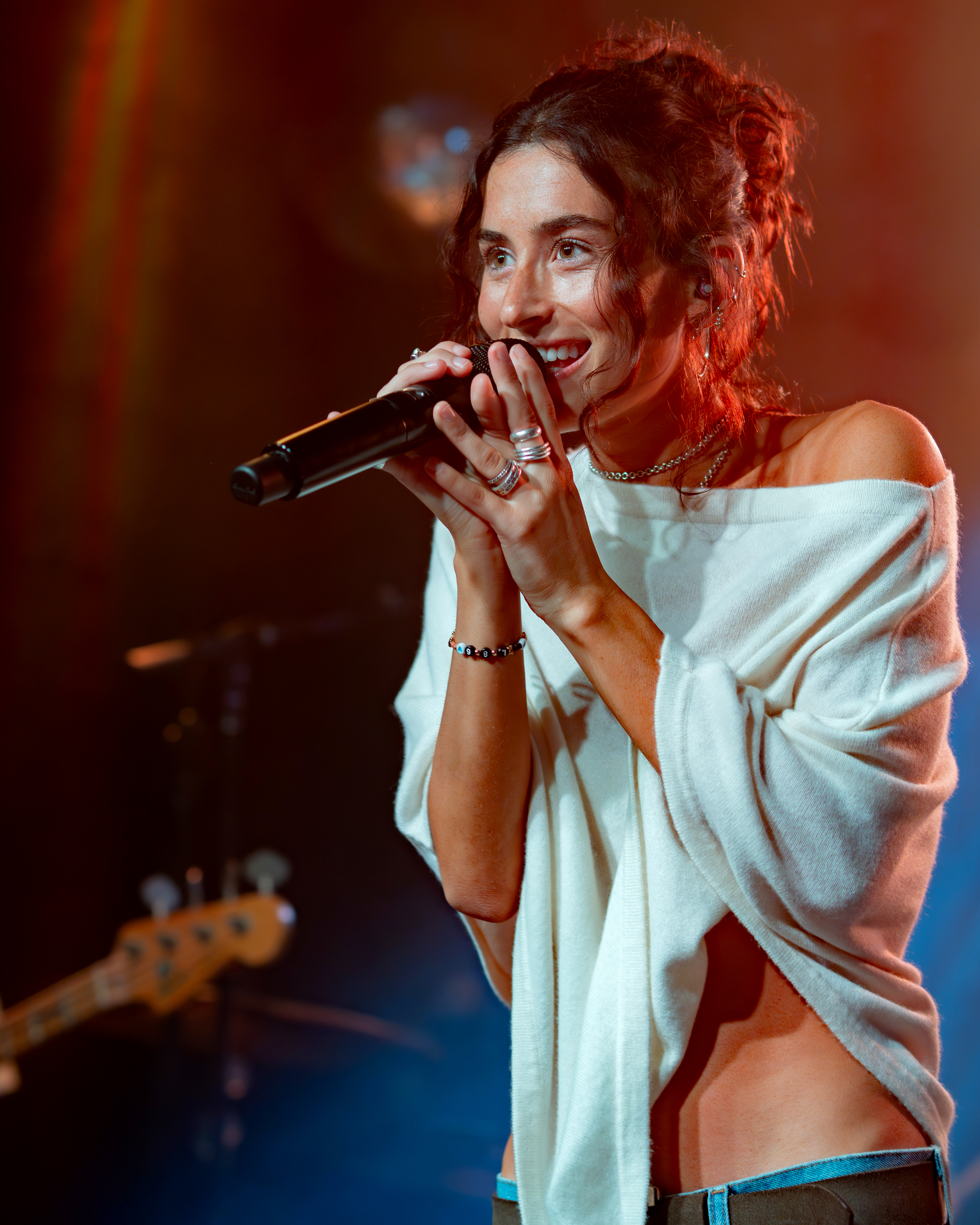
"Boston" was an airplay number one for Stella Lefty.

Chart histories
Issue date	Hot Country Songs			Country Airplay		
Issue date	Title	Artist(s)	Ref.	Title	Artist(s)	Ref.
January 3	"Choosin' Texas"	Ella Langley		"Cowgirl"	Parmalee	
January 10	"Choosin' Texas"	Ella Langley		"Cowgirl"	Parmalee	
January 17	"Choosin' Texas"	Ella Langley		"Stay Country or Die Tryin'"	Blake Shelton	
January 24	"Choosin' Texas"	Ella Langley		"Favorite Country Song"	Hardy	
January 31	"Choosin' Texas"	Ella Langley		"Favorite Country Song"	Hardy	
February 7	"Choosin' Texas"	Ella Langley		"Favorite Country Song"	Hardy	
February 14	"Choosin' Texas"	Ella Langley		"Choosin' Texas"	Ella Langley	
February 21	"Choosin' Texas"	Ella Langley		"How Far Does a Goodbye Go"	Jason Aldean	
February 28	"Choosin' Texas"	Ella Langley		"20 Cigarettes"	Morgan Wallen	
March 7	"Choosin' Texas"	Ella Langley		"20 Cigarettes"	Morgan Wallen	
March 14	"Choosin' Texas"	Ella Langley		"Choosin' Texas"	Ella Langley	
March 21	"Choosin' Texas"	Ella Langley		"Choosin' Texas"	Ella Langley	
March 28	"Choosin' Texas"	Ella Langley		"Amen"	Shaboozey and Jelly Roll	
April 4	"Choosin' Texas"	Ella Langley		"Amen"	Shaboozey and Jelly Roll	
April 11	"Choosin' Texas"	Ella Langley		"Time's Ticking"	Justin Moore	
April 18	"Choosin' Texas"	Ella Langley		"Sleepless in a Hotel Room"	Luke Combs	
April 25	"Choosin' Texas"	Ella Langley		"Sleepless in a Hotel Room"	Luke Combs	
May 2	"Choosin' Texas"	Ella Langley		"Sleepless in a Hotel Room"	Luke Combs	
May 9	"Choosin' Texas"	Ella Langley		"Sleepless in a Hotel Room"	Luke Combs	
May 16	"Choosin' Texas"	Ella Langley		"Sleepless in a Hotel Room"	Luke Combs	
May 23	"Choosin' Texas"	Ella Langley		"The Fall"	Cody Johnson	
May 30	"Choosin' Texas"	Ella Langley		"Brunette"	Tucker Wetmore	
June 6	"Choosin' Texas"	Ella Langley		"Be Her"	Ella Langley	
June 13	"Choosin' Texas"	Ella Langley		"Be Her"	Ella Langley	
June 20	"I Knew It, I Knew You"	Taylor Swift		"Be Her"	Ella Langley	
June 27	"I Knew It, I Knew You"	Taylor Swift		"Be Her"	Ella Langley	
July 4	"Choosin' Texas"	Ella Langley		"Hate How You Look"	Josh Ross	
July 11	"Choosin' Texas"	Ella Langley		"Don't Tell on Me"	Jason Aldean	
July 18	"Choosin' Texas"	Ella Langley		"Don't Tell on Me"	Jason Aldean	
July 25	"Choosin' Texas"	Ella Langley		"Don't Tell on Me"	Jason Aldean	
August 1	"Choosin' Texas"	Ella Langley		"Don't We"	Morgan Wallen	
August 8	"Choosin' Texas"	Ella Langley		"Don't We"	Morgan Wallen	
August 15	"Choosin' Texas"	Ella Langley		"I Can't Love You Anymore"	Ella Langley and Morgan Wallen	
August 22	"Choosin' Texas"	Ella Langley		"I Can't Love You Anymore"	Ella Langley and Morgan Wallen	
August 29	"Choosin' Texas"	Ella Langley		"Be By You"	Luke Combs	
September 5	"Choosin' Texas"	Ella Langley		"Be By You"	Luke Combs	
September 12	"Choosin' Texas"	Ella Langley		"Be By You"	Luke Combs	
September 19	"Choosin' Texas"	Ella Langley		"Be By You"	Luke Combs	
September 26	"Choosin' Texas"	Ella Langley		"Boston"	Stella Lefty	
October 3	"Choosin' Texas"	Ella Langley		"Boston"	Stella Lefty	
October 10	"Choosin' Texas"	Ella Langley		"Carry On"	Kenny Chesney	
October 17	"Choosin' Texas"	Ella Langley		"Kid Myself"	John Morgan	
October 24	"Choosin' Texas"	Ella Langley		"All My Exes"	Lauren Alaina featuring Chase Matthew	
October 31	"Choosin' Texas"	Ella Langley		"Loving Life Again"	Ella Langley	
November 7	"Choosin' Texas"	Ella Langley		"Been By Now"	Morgan Wallen	
November 14	"Choosin' Texas"	Ella Langley		"Loving Life Again"	Ella Langley	
November 21	"Choosin' Texas"	Ella Langley		"Loving Life Again"	Ella Langley	
November 28	tba	tba		"Get to Drinkin'"	Zach John King	

== See also ==
- 2026 in country music
- List of Top Country Albums number ones of 2026
