= Days Like These =

Days Like These may refer to:

== Film and TV ==
- Days Like These (TV series), a 1999 British remake of the American sitcom That '70s Show
- Days Like These, a 2007 telemovie starring Lillian Crombie

== Music ==
- Days Like These (album), a 2008 album by Diesel
- "Days Like These" (Asia song), 1990
- "Days Like These" (Luke Combs song), 2025
- "Days Like These" (The Cat Empire song), 2003
- "Days Like These", a song by Billy Bragg from Reaching to the Converted, 1999, and its "DC Remix" from the Live and Dubious EP.
- "Days Like These", a song by Janis Ian from the soundtrack to Falling from Grace (film), 1992
- "Days Like These", a song by Low from Hey What, 2021

== See also ==
- "Tage wie diese", a song by Die Toten Hosen
