= Wish Upon a Whiskey =

2026 song by Luke Combs

Song by Luke Combs

from the album The Way I Am
- Released: March 20, 2026
- Genre: Country
- Length: 3:51
- Label: Sony; Seven Ridges
- Songwriters: Luke Combs; Dan Isbell; Drew Parker
- Producers: Luke Combs; Jonathan Singleton; Chip Matthews

"Wish Upon a Whiskey" is a song by American country music singer Luke Combs. It is the eighth track from his sixth studio album, The Way I Am, released on March 20, 2026. Combs co-wrote the song alongside Dan Isbell and Drew Parker and co-produced the song alongside Jonathan Singleton and Chip Matthews.

== Background ==
"Wish Upon a Whiskey" was debuted live on January 31, 2026, in Sydney. The song was one of several that had been teased prior to the release of his sixth studio album, The Way I Am, which includes songs like "Rethink Some Things" and "I Ain't No Cowboy".

"Wish Upon a Whiskey" is a piano-driven ballad that has Combs do everything he can to get over a breakup, but ultimately decides to find comfort in a bottle of Jack Daniel's, with the album's title being a play on the phrase "wish upon a star".

== Critical reception and commercial performance ==
Melinda Newman and Jessica Nicholson of Billboard ranked the song as the fifth-best song from The Way I Am, stating that Combs has "one of the most vulnerable, expressive voices in country and he uses it to great effect on 'Wish Upon a Whiskey'".

"Wish Upon a Whiskey" was one of 14 songs from The Way I Am to chart on the Billboard Hot Country Songs chart, being the second-highest non-single and debuting at number 34.

== Personnel ==
Credits adapted from Tidal.

=== Musicians ===
- Luke Combs – lead vocals
- Jerry Roe – drums, percussion
- Mat Maxwell – bass
- Rob McNelley – electric guitar
- Bobby Terry – pedal steel guitar
- Todd Lombardo – acoustic guitar
- Gordon Mote – piano, organ
- Jonathan Singleton – background vocals
- Chip Matthews – background vocals, percussion

=== Technical ===
- Luke Combs – production
- Chip Matthews – production, editing, mixing, additional engineer
- Jonathan Singleton – production
- Chris Vanoverberghe – assistant recording
- Michael Proctor – editing
- Steve Blackmon – editing, recording
- Benny Quinn – mastering

== Charts ==
Chart performance for "Wish Upon a Whiskey"
Chart (2026)	Peak position
Canada Hot 100 (Billboard)	88
New Zealand Hot Singles (RMNZ)	11
US Bubbling Under Hot 100 (Billboard)	5
US Hot Country Songs (Billboard)	23
