= List of Top Country Albums number ones of 2026 =

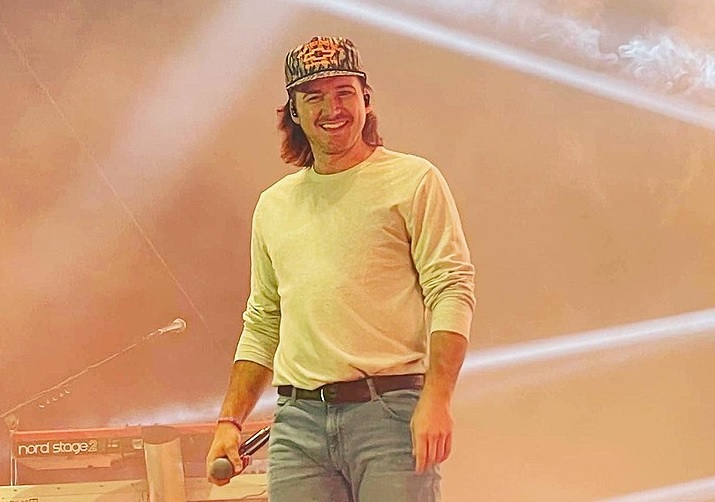
With the first chart of 2026, Morgan Wallen completed an uninterrupted year at number one.

Top Country Albums is a chart that ranks the top-performing country music albums in the United States, published by Billboard magazine. Chart positions are based on multi-metric consumption, blending traditional album sales, track equivalent albums, and streaming equivalent albums.

In the issue of Billboard dated January 3, I'm the Problem by Morgan Wallen held the number one position. It was the album's 32nd consecutive week at number one and Wallen's 52nd consecutive week in the top spot.

== Chart history ==
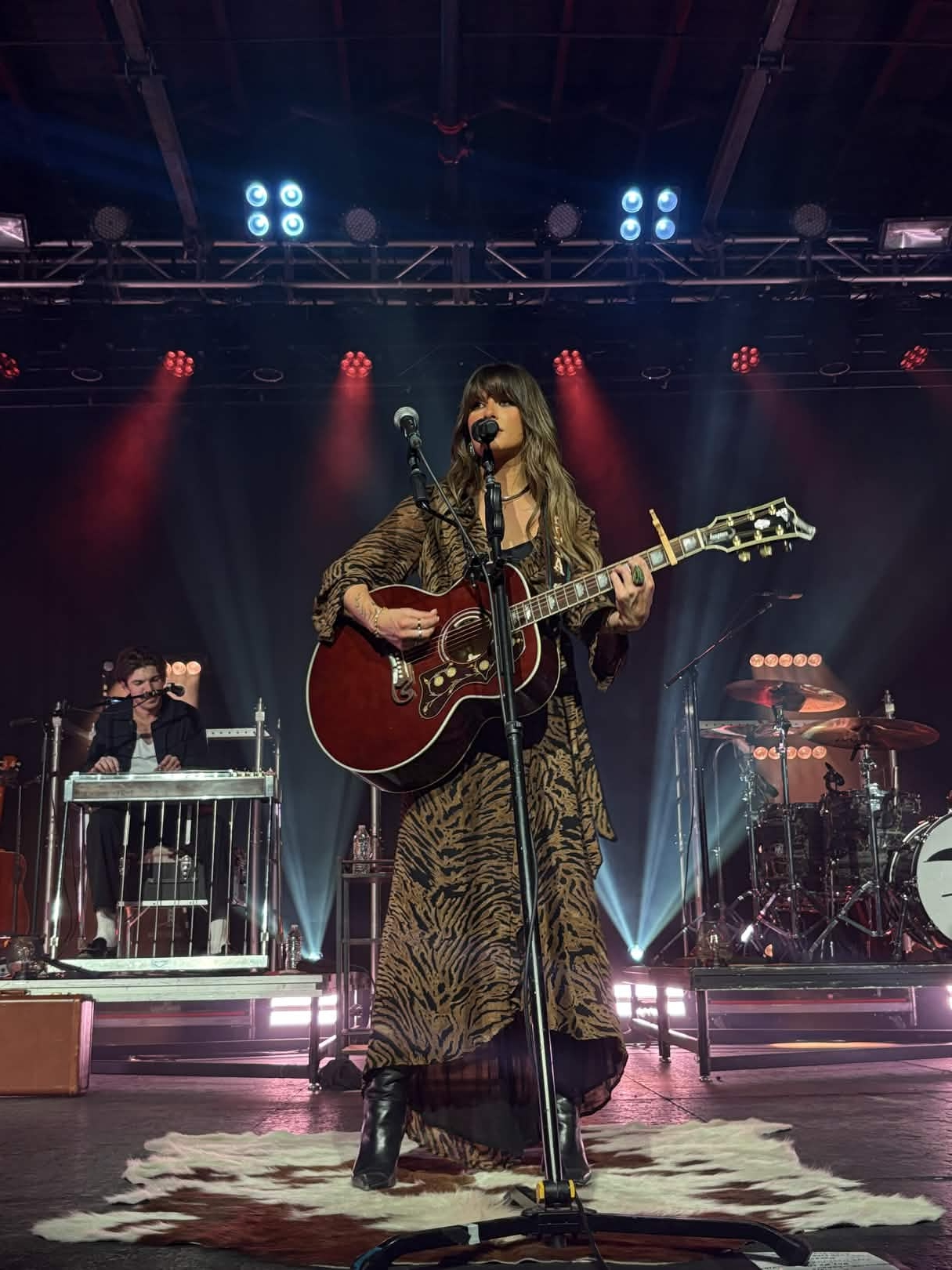
Ella Langley topped the chart in April.

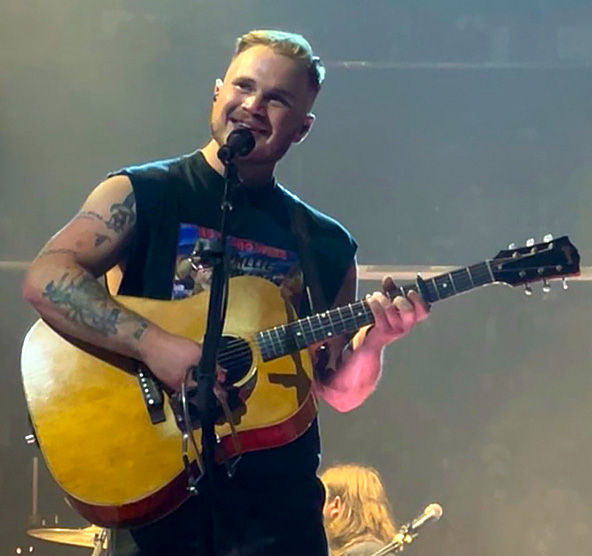
Zach Bryan is the only artist with more than one chart-topping album in 2026.

Issue date	Title	Artist(s)	Ref.
January 3	I'm the Problem	Morgan Wallen	
January 10	I'm the Problem	Morgan Wallen	
January 17	I'm the Problem	Morgan Wallen	
January 24	With Heaven on Top	Zach Bryan	
January 31	I'm the Problem	Morgan Wallen	
February 7	I'm the Problem	Morgan Wallen	
February 14	I'm the Problem	Morgan Wallen	
February 21	I'm the Problem	Morgan Wallen	
February 28	I'm the Problem	Morgan Wallen	
March 7	Cloud 9	Megan Moroney	
March 14	I'm the Problem	Morgan Wallen	
March 21	I'm the Problem	Morgan Wallen	
March 28	I'm the Problem	Morgan Wallen	
April 4	The Way I Am	Luke Combs	
April 11	I'm the Problem	Morgan Wallen	
April 18	I'm the Problem	Morgan Wallen	
April 25	Dandelion	Ella Langley	
May 2	Dandelion	Ella Langley	
May 9	Dandelion	Ella Langley	
May 16	Dandelion	Ella Langley	
May 23	Dandelion	Ella Langley	
May 30	Dandelion	Ella Langley	
June 6	Dandelion	Ella Langley	
June 13	Dandelion	Ella Langley	
June 20	Dandelion	Ella Langley	
June 27	Dandelion	Ella Langley	
July 4	Dandelion	Ella Langley	
July 11	Dandelion	Ella Langley	
July 18	Dandelion	Ella Langley	
July 25	I'm the Problem	Morgan Wallen	
August 1	I'm the Problem	Morgan Wallen	
August 8	I'm the Problem	Morgan Wallen	
August 15	I'm the Problem	Morgan Wallen	
August 22	Dandelion	Ella Langley	
August 29	Dandelion	Ella Langley	
September 5	Dandelion	Ella Langley	
September 12	Dandelion	Ella Langley	
September 19	Dandelion	Ella Langley	
September 26	Dandelion	Ella Langley	
October 3	Dandelion	Ella Langley	
October 10	Dandelion	Ella Langley	
October 17	I'm the Problem	Morgan Wallen	
October 24	I'm the Problem	Morgan Wallen	
October 31	Young Manhood and Other Donatable Organs	Zach Bryan	
November 7	I'm the Problem	Morgan Wallen	
November 14	I'm the Problem	Morgan Wallen	
November 21	I'm the Problem	Morgan Wallen	

== See also ==
- 2026 in country music
- List of Billboard number-one country songs of 2026
