= Giving Her Away =

2025 song by Luke Combs

Promotional single by Luke Combs

from the album The Way I Am
- Released: December 5, 2025
- Genre: Country
- Length: 3:33
- Label: Seven Ridges; Sony
- Songwriters: Gary Garris; Josh Mirenda; Josh Phillips
- Producers: Luke Combs; Jonathan Singleton

"Giving Her Away" is a promotional single by American country music singer Luke Combs, released on December 5, 2025. It was written by Gary Garris, Josh Mirenda and Josh Phillips and produced by Combs himself and Jonathan Singleton.

== Background ==
According to Combs, Josh Phillips sent him the song. He also told his fans, "Josh used to crash on the couch with me back in Boone, and I used to go down and play shows with him, so it's kind of a full circle moment for me to get to record one of his songs and put it out there for you guys." Combs previewed the song on Instagram in November 2025, with a video of himself singing it. A week later, on November 26, he posted a photo showing black headphones on a sheet of paper with the lyrics to the song.

== Composition ==
A piano-driven ballad, the song depicts the moments leading up to a wedding, as Combs sings from the perspective of a groom. The lyrics are addressed to the father of his bride and center on the overwhelming emotions of both men as the marriage occurs. Combs begins by joking that on a normal weekend, they would usually be fishing, with their tackle box and Zebco, and vows to do his best to take over his duties of caring for her. The song gradually introduces steel guitar by the chorus, during which he admits that they are both on the verge of tears. He highlights that both their lives will change as the father gives his daughter to Combs.

== Charts ==
Chart performance for "Giving Her Away"
Chart (2025)	Peak position
Canada Hot 100 (Billboard)	73
New Zealand Hot Singles (RMNZ)	4
US Bubbling Under Hot 100 (Billboard)	4
US Hot Country Songs (Billboard)	26
