= Fathers & Sons (Luke Combs album) =

Studio album by Luke Combs
- Released: June 14, 2024
- Studios: Soundstage (Nashville); The Tin Ear (Nashville)
- Genre: Country
- Length: 40:10
- Labels: Columbia Nashville; Seven Ridges
- Producers: Luke Combs; Chip Matthews; Jonathan Singleton

Luke Combs chronology
| Gettin' Old (2023) | Fathers & Sons (2024) | The Way I Am (2026) |

Singles from Fathers & Sons
- 1. "The Man He Sees in Me" Released: June 6, 2024

Fathers & Sons is the fifth studio album by American country music singer Luke Combs, released on June 14, 2024, through Columbia Nashville and Seven Ridges Records. It was preceded by the song "The Man He Sees in Me". The album is produced by Combs, Chip Matthews and Jonathan Singleton. It reached the top ten in Australia, Canada, New Zealand, and the United States.

== Background ==
Combs first played the song "Take Me Out to the Ballgame" (not to be confused with the identically titled song from Tin Pan Alley) in April 2024, during his two concerts at American Family Field in Milwaukee, Wisconsin. He first announced the album on June 6, 2024, as well as releasing the lead single "The Man He Sees in Me".

The album was released two days before Father's Day in the US, with Combs partnering with American Greetings to allow people to use his lyrics in their virtual greeting cards.

== Critical reception ==
Professional ratings
Review scores
| Source | Rating |
|---|---|
| AllMusic | 4/5 stars |
| Country Central | 8.4/10 |
| The Independent | 3/5 stars |
| Riff Magazine | 8/10 |

Piper Westrom of Riff Magazine described the album as "a poignant ode to new fatherhood" and its songs "slow and deliberate, led by acoustic guitar and piano, with the focus clearly on the songwriting", concluding that it is "personal and authentic" and "beautiful".

== Release and promotion ==
Fathers & Sons was released on June 14, 2024, by Columbia Nashville and Seven Ridges Records. The album's lead single "The Man He Sees in Me" was released on June 6, 2024. Songs from the album are also being performed as part of Combs' Growin' Up and Gettin' Old Tour.

== Track listing ==
Fathers & Sons track listing
| No. | Title | Writer(s) | Length |
|---|---|---|---|
| 1. | "Front Door Famous" | Luke Combs; Nick Columbia; Blake Densmore; Robert Snyder; Noah Thompson | 3:18 |
| 2. | "In Case I Ain't Around" | Combs; Jamie Davis; Ray Fulcher; Dan Isbell; Reid Isbell | 3:30 |
| 3. | "Huntin' by Yourself" | Combs; Thomas Archer; Fulcher; Alex Palmer; Michael Tyler | 3:59 |
| 4. | "Little Country Boys" | Luke Bryan; Blair Daly; Dallas Davidson | 3:15 |
| 5. | "Whoever You Turn Out to Be" | Rhett Akins; Ben Stennis | 3:18 |
| 6. | "Remember Him That Way" | Combs; Jessi Alexander; Erik Dylan; Jonathan Singleton | 3:56 |
| 7. | "The Man He Sees in Me" | Combs; Josh Phillips | 2:45 |
| 8. | "All I Ever Do Is Leave" | Alexander; Andrew Dorff; Singleton | 3:21 |
| 9. | "Plant a Seed" | Combs; Jeff Hyde; Wyatt McCubbin; Snyder | 3:14 |
| 10. | "Ride Around Heaven" | Combs; Casey Beathard; McCubbin; Jeremy Stover | 3:03 |
| 11. | "My Old Man Was Right" | Combs; Lori McKenna | 3:15 |
| 12. | "Take Me Out to the Ballgame" | Combs; Fulcher; Adam James | 3:16 |
| Total length: | | | 40:10 |

== Personnel ==
Credits adapted from the album's liner notes and Tidal.

- Luke Combs – lead vocals, production
- Chip Matthews – background vocals, production, additional recording, mixing, overdub engineering
- Jonathan Singleton – acoustic guitar, background vocals, production
- Drew Bollman – recording
- Steve Blackmon – recording
- Zach Kuhlman – recording assistance
- Benny Quinn – mastering
- Jim "Moose" Brown – keyboards (tracks 1, 2, 8–12)
- Sam Bush – mandolin (tracks 3–7)
- Stuart Duncan – fiddle (tracks 1, 2, 8–12)
- Mark Hill – bass (tracks 1, 2, 8–12)
- Josh Hunt – drums (tracks 3–7)
- Joey Landreth – electric guitar (tracks 1, 2, 8–12)
- Steve Mackey – bass (tracks 3–7)
- Josh Matheny – Dobro (tracks 3–7)
- Jerry Roe – drums (tracks 1, 2, 8–12)
- Bryan Sutton – acoustic guitar (tracks 3–7)
- Charlie Worsham – acoustic guitar (tracks 1, 2, 8–12)
- Zack Massey – photography
- Tracy Fleaner – design

== Charts ==
=== Weekly charts ===
Weekly chart performance for Fathers & Sons
| Chart (2024) | Peak position |
|---|---|
| Australian Albums (ARIA) | 3 |
| Canadian Albums (Billboard) | 6 |
| Irish Albums (Official Charts) | 13 |
| New Zealand Albums (RMNZ) | 5 |
| Norwegian Albums (VG-lista) | 12 |
| Scottish Albums (Official Charts) | 12 |
| Swedish Albums (Sverigetopplistan) | 23 |
| Swiss Albums (Schweizer Hitparade) | 56 |
| UK Albums (Official Charts) | 14 |
| UK Country Albums (Official Charts) | 1 |
| US Billboard 200 | 6 |
| US Top Country Albums (Billboard) | 2 |

=== Year-end charts ===
2024 year-end chart performance for Fathers & Sons
| Chart (2024) | Position |
|---|---|
| Australian Country Albums (ARIA) | 13 |
| US Top Country Albums (Billboard) | 45 |

2025 year-end chart performance for Fathers & Sons
| Chart (2025) | Position |
|---|---|
| Australian Albums (ARIA) | 86 |

== Certifications ==
Certifications for Fathers & Sons
| Region | Certification | Certified units/sales |
|---|---|---|
| United Kingdom (BPI) | Silver | 60,000^{‡} |
^{‡} Sales+streaming figures based on certification alone.
