= Twisters: The Album =

Soundtrack album by various artists
- Released: July 19, 2024
- Genres: Country; Americana
- Length: 92:40
- Label: Atlantic
- Producers: Kevin Weaver; Brandon Davis; Ian Cripps; Joseph Khoury

Singles from Twisters: The Album
- 1. "Ain't No Love in Oklahoma" Released: May 16, 2024

Professional ratings
Review scores
Source	Rating
AllMusic	4/5 stars

Twisters: The Album is the soundtrack to the 2024 film Twisters directed by Lee Isaac Chung, a standalone sequel to Twister (1996). It was released through Atlantic Records on July 19, 2024, the same day as the North American theatrical release and featured 29 songs from country music artists. The album is produced by Kevin Weaver, Brandon Davis, Ian Cripps and Joseph Khoury.

The album was preceded by its lead single, "Ain't No Love in Oklahoma" by Luke Combs, which was released on May 16, 2024, followed by a string of promotional singles released in the weeks leading up the soundtrack's release.

== Background ==
On May 8, 2024, the second trailer for Twisters was released through social media platforms and towards the end of the trailer, the producers announced the soundtrack titled Twisters: The Album similar to the predecessor which also featured an accompanying soundtrack of pop hits featured in the film. On May 16, the complete track list for the soundtrack was revealed which consisted of 29 songs from country music acts, such as Luke Combs, Miranda Lambert, Bailey Zimmerman, Megan Moroney, Tucker Wetmore, Tanner Adell, Conner Smith, Leon Bridges and several others. Its release marked the first blockbuster film release to feature a completely original country music soundtrack since the soundtrack to Urban Cowboy in 1980.

== Production ==
Twisters: The Album was compiled by the film's music supervisor Rachel Levy and Mike Knobloch, executive vice president of music for Universal Pictures. Knobloch did not want to recreate the predecessor's soundtrack. Instead, Knobloch treated it as his own project. He worked closely with Chung to conceive a musical soundscape for that film which would be "organic and authentic to where the story takes place, which is in Oklahoma" resulting him to collaborate with country artists and songwriters from that location to write music for the album. Knobloch collaborated with Weaver to distribute the soundtrack through Atlantic Records over multiple labels, following the success of Barbie the Album (2023) as the label had signed multiple country music artists, following the genre boom, adding "We know from past experiences that Kevin and his team, like us, are super-competitive and uncompromising perfectionists [...] They want to take big swings like we do. It just felt like Atlantic as a partner had the right attitude. Everyone on the core team [at Atlantic] has great Nashville relationships." According to Weaver, he wanted the music to become a character of the film, over compiling popular music for the purpose of a soundtrack.

Levy who had been a fan of country music admitted it as exciting to work with, as music supervisors do not have that opportunity to work with country musicians. Weaver, Chung and Knobloch met Levy multiple times with Chung selecting over 20 scenes for which he wanted original songs. The label then solicited artists to write specifically for those sequences based on the visuals and brief about tempo, tone and thematic suggestions. All of the songs were written specifically for the film, except for two songs, "Boots Don't" which was performed by Shania Twain and Breland and "(Ghost) Riders in the Sky", covered for the film by Charley Crockett. Twain's "No One Needs to Know" (1996) was used in the first film, and Knobloch found it "cool" on her song being used for the sequel as well.

Lainey Wilson was the first artist to be signed who was confirmed within early-January. Despite the busy schedules, several other artists seemed to be interested on working on the album after the team reached to them, resulted in assembling nearly 30 artists. Since the album consisted of several songs, they had to work responsibly in keeping the budget under control.

== Release ==
Twisters: The Album was released day-and-date with the film on July 19, 2024, through Atlantic Records. Besides its release for digital download, the soundtrack was made available through compact discs and multiple variants of vinyl records exclusively on the album's official website. Pre-orders for the soundtrack were made digitally through Apple Music on May 16.

=== Singles ===
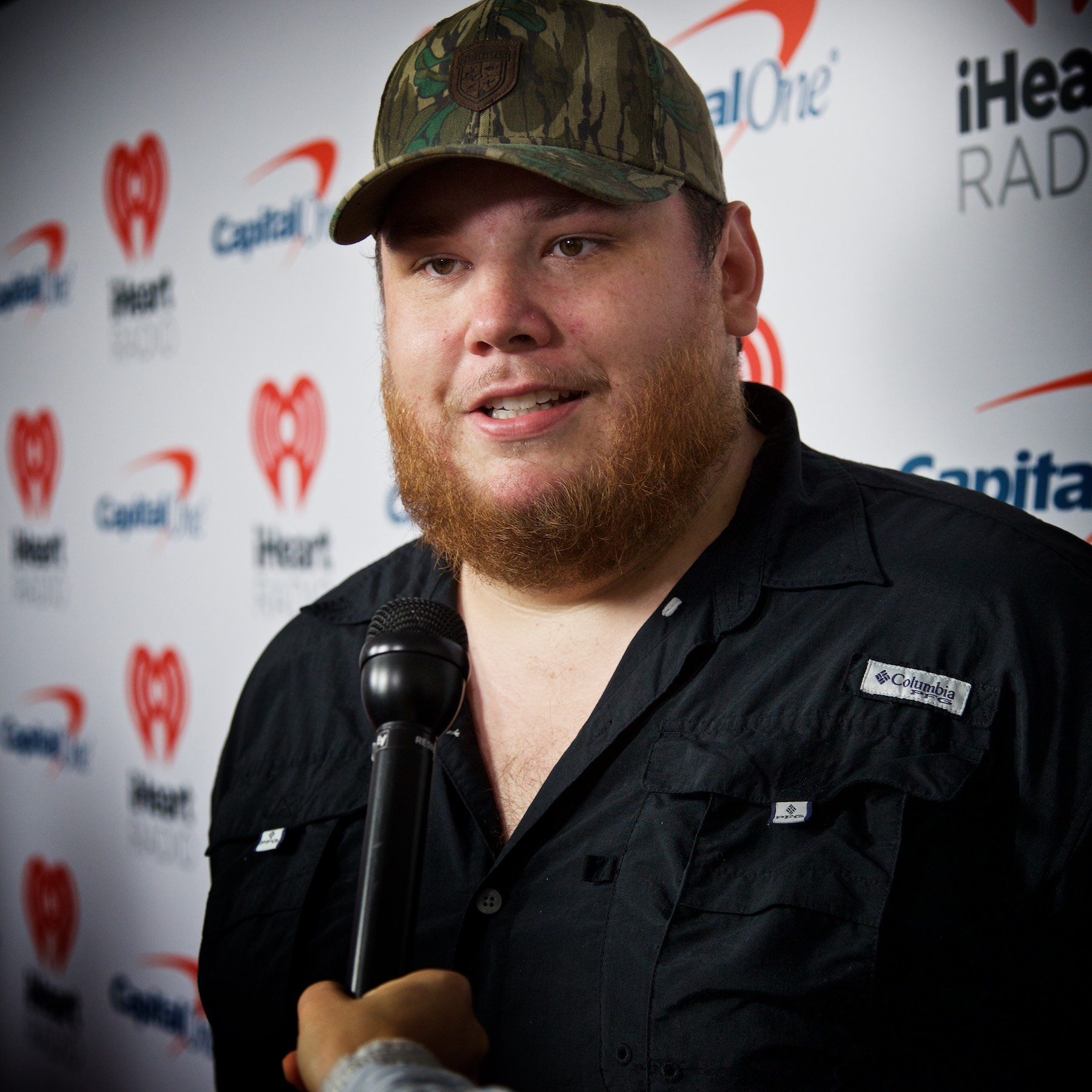
The song "Ain't No Love in Oklahoma" by Luke Combs was the first single to be released from the Twisters soundtrack.

Starting with May 16, each song from Twisters: The Album were released as singles leading to the album's release, that provided a long musical runway and social media campaigns. Knobloch and Weaver deciphered on the release strategy, which would make as big an impact and create interest and awareness for a long period of time in the run up to the film's release and the songs "have the ability to have their own moment, [so that] they perform better typically".

The song "Ain't No Love in Oklahoma" was the first to be released as a single from the album; it was performed by American country music singer Luke Combs who co-wrote it with Jessi Alexander and Jonathan Singleton. It soundtracked the film's second trailer released on May 8, 2024 and was written specifically for the film. On May 16, 2024, the full song in its entirety was released to digital platforms with an accompanying music video directed by Alex Bittan and featuring NASCAR driver John Hunter Nemechek. Speaking to Audacy, Inc., Combs described it as a "high-energy, high-octane" track that matched the film's vibe intentionally. The song debuted at number 24 on the Billboard Country Airplay chart week dated May 25, 2024.

Following "Ain't No Love in Oklahoma", a string of additional promotional singles were released leading up to the release of the soundtrack. "Hell or High Water" by Bailey Zimmerman was released next on May 23. "Never Left Me" by Megan Moroney was released on May 31; it was Moroney's maiden contribution for a film music project and felt that it was her idea to write about her childhood home, adding "It's about how you leave, but when you come back, nothing changes. It's still the place that made you." It was then subsequently followed by "Already Had It" by Tucker Wetmore on June 7, "Too Easy" by Tanner Adell on June 14, "Out of Oklahoma" by Lainey Wilson on June 20, "Song While You're Away" by Tyler Childers on June 28, "Feelin' Country" by Thomas Rhett on July 3, "Steal My Thunder" by Conner Smith featuring Wetmore on July 10, and "Ain't in Kansas Anymore" by Miranda Lambert on July 12. "Tear Us Apart" by Sam Barber, "Before I Do" by Wyatt Flores and Jake Kohn, "Stronger Than a Storm" by Dylan Gossett, "Leave the Light On" by Jelly Roll featuring Alexandra Kay and "Dead End Road" by Jelly Roll were subsequently released during July 15–18, prior to the soundtrack's release. "Dead End Road" would be used as an official theme song for WWE's SummerSlam event in 2024.

== Track listing ==
Twisters: The Album track listing
No.	Title	Writer(s)	Producer(s)	Length
1.	"Ain't No Love in Oklahoma" (performed by Luke Combs)	Jessi Alexander; Luke Combs; Jonathan Singleton	Combs; Chip Matthews; Singleton	3:30
2.	"Ain't in Kansas Anymore" (performed by Miranda Lambert)	Jenee Fleenor; Jesse Frasure; Miranda Lambert	Frasure	3:14
3.	"Steal My Thunder" (performed by Conner Smith featuring Tucker Wetmore)	Matt Jenkins; Ben Johnson; Blake Pendergrass; Conner Smith	Johnson	3:09
4.	"Feelin' Country" (performed by Thomas Rhett)	Ashley Gorley; Chris LaCorte; Chase McGill; Thomas Rhett; Parker Welling	Dann Huff; Julian Bunetta; Chris LaCorte^{[v]}	2:44
5.	"The Cards I've Been Dealt" (performed by Warren Zeiders)	Charlie Worsham; Warren Zeiders	Ross Copperman; Zeiders	2:48
6.	"Never Left Me" (performed by Megan Moroney)	Alexander; Jessie Jo Dillon; Connie Harrington; Megan Moroney	Kristian Bush	3:11
7.	"Out of Oklahoma" (performed by Lainey Wilson)	Luke Dick; Shane McAnally; Lainey Wilson	Dick	3:28
8.	"Hell or High Water" (performed by Bailey Zimmerman)	Gorley; Austin Shawn	Shawn	3:14
9.	"Dead End Road" (performed by Jelly Roll)	Brock Berryhill; Jason DeFord; Jaxson Free; Taylor Phillips	Berryhill	2:32
10.	"Country Classic" (performed by Kane Brown)	Jon Capeci; Gabe Foust; Free	Huff	2:55
11.	"Tear Us Apart" (performed by Sam Barber)	Sam Barber; Johnson; Eddie Spear	Spear	2:45
12.	"Song While You're Away" (performed by Tyler Childers)	Tyler Childers	Childers; Ryan Hewitt	5:00
13.	"Already Had It" (performed by Tucker Wetmore)	Johnny McGuire; Grant Vogel; Tucker Wetmore	Johnny Reno; Johnson; Vogel	2:45
14.	"Chrome Cowgirl" (performed by Leon Bridges)	Amy Allen; Leon Bridges; John Ryan	Ryan	2:28
15.	"Death Wish Love" (performed by Benson Boone)	Benson Boone; Philip Plested; Morten Ristorp; Johnny Simpson; Madi Yanofsky	J5; Rissi	3:43
16.	"Boots Don't" (performed by Shania Twain and Breland)	Daniel Breland; Steph Jones; Jimmy Robbins; Sean Small; Sam Sumser; Shania Twain; Theron Thomas	Small; Sumser; Thomas	2:28
17.	"Stronger Than a Storm" (performed by Dylan Gossett)	Blake Gossett; Dylan Gossett	Spear	4:06
18.	"Chasing the Wind" (performed by Lanie Gardner)	Ryan Linvill; Rollo Spreckley; Cleo Tighe	Linvill	2:53
19.	"Leave the Light On" (performed by Jelly Roll featuring Alexandra Kay)	DeFord; Dillon; Frasure; Hillary Lindsey; Pendergrass	Frasure	3:20
20.	"Before I Do" (performed by Wyatt Flores and Jake Kohn)	Jake Kohn; Wyatt Flores	Spear	3:49
21.	"Caddo Country" (performed by The Red Clay Strays)	Dave Cobb; Brandon Coleman; Matthew Coleman; Eric Erdman; John Hall; Andrew Nix	Cobb	3:21
22.	"Blackberry Wine" (performed by Tanner Usrey)	Beau Bedford; Aaron Raitiere; Tanner Usrey	Bedford	3:33
23.	"Too Easy" (performed by Tanner Adell)	Tanner Adell; Akil King; Stephen McGregor; Jared Mullins; Will Weatherly	WorldwideFresh; Di Genius; Weatherly	2:30
24.	"Shake Shake (All Night Long)" (performed by Mason Ramsey)	Dan Fernandez; Mason Ramsey	Fernandez	3:01
25.	"New Loop" (performed by Tyler Halverson)	Tyler Halverson	Spear	3:02
26.	"Touchdown" (performed by Flatland Cavalry)	Dwight A. Baker; Cleto Cordero	Baker	3:07
27.	"Driving You Home" (performed by Nolan Taylor)	Ehren Ebbage; Nolan Taylor	Ebbage	4:08
28.	"Wall of Death" (performed by Wilderado, Ken Pomeroy, and James McAlister)	Richard Thompson	James McAlister	2:29
29.	"(Ghost) Riders in the Sky" (performed by Charley Crockett)	Stan Jones	Crockett; Kullen Fox	3:27
Total length:				94:27

Note

- ^{^[v]} signifies a vocal producer

== Charts ==
=== Weekly charts ===
Weekly chart performance for Twisters: The Album
Chart (2024)	Peak position
Australian Albums (ARIA)	29
Australian Country Albums (ARIA)	4
Canadian Albums (Billboard)	8
Hungarian Physical Albums (MAHASZ)	28
New Zealand Albums (RMNZ)	35
UK Album Downloads (Official Charts)	6
UK Compilation Albums (Official Charts)	1
UK Soundtrack Albums (Official Charts)	1
US Billboard 200	7
US Top Country Albums (Billboard)	3
US Soundtrack Albums (Billboard)	1

=== Year-end charts ===
2024 year-end chart performance for Twisters: The Album
Chart (2024)	Position
Australian Country Albums (ARIA)	43
US Billboard 200	165
US Top Country Albums (Billboard)	34
US Soundtrack Albums (Billboard)	5

2025 year-end chart performance for Twisters: The Album
Chart (2025)	Position
US Billboard 200	144
US Top Country Albums (Billboard)	29
US Soundtrack Albums (Billboard)	3

== Certifications ==
Certifications for Twisters: The Album
Region	Certification	Certified units/sales
United States (RIAA)	Gold	500,000^{‡}
^{‡} Sales+streaming figures based on certification alone.

== Accolades ==
Year-end lists
Publication	Rank	List
Rolling Stone	30	The 30 Best Country Albums of 2024
