= The Way I Am (Luke Combs album) =

Studio album by Luke Combs
- Released: March 20, 2026
- Genre: Country
- Length: 73:13
- Labels: Sony; Seven Ridges
- Producers: Luke Combs; Chip Matthews; Jonathan Singleton

Luke Combs chronology
Fathers & Sons (2024)	The Way I Am (2026)

Singles from The Way I Am
- 1. "Back in the Saddle" Released: July 28, 2025; 2. "Days Like These" Released: November 10, 2025; 3. "Sleepless in a Hotel Room" Released: January 26, 2026; 4. "Be By You" Released: May 5, 2026; 5. "Rethink Some Things" Released: July 13, 2026; 6. "Miss You Here" Released: October 2, 2026

The Way I Am is the sixth studio album by American country music singer Luke Combs. It was released on March 20, 2026, through Sony Music Nashville and Seven Ridges Records. Combs co-produced the album alongside Chip Matthews and Jonathan Singleton, who both have worked with Combs since his 2019 album, What You See Is What You Get.

The album was preceded by the release of the singles "Back in the Saddle", which became Combs' 19th Billboard Country Airplay number one, "Days Like These", and "Sleepless in a Hotel Room", which became his 20th Billboard Country Airplay number one. "Be By You" was shipped to radio in May after the album's release. "Rethink Some Things" was released to country radio in July as the fifth single. It reached the top ten in the United Kingdom, Australia, Canada, United States, New Zealand, Ireland, Scotland, and Norway.

== Release and promotion ==
Combs released the debut single, "Back in the Saddle", on July 25, 2025, along with the accompanying music video, which was directed by Tyler Adams. The music video features NASCAR drivers Dale Earnhardt Jr. and Richard Petty. In a short Instagram video posted the same day by Combs promoting this release, he teased "so much more music coming up".

On September 30, 2025, Combs announced the release of "The Prequel", featuring three new songs from the new album, including the album's second single, "Days Like These", to be released on October 3, 2025. Combs confirmed these songs would be on his upcoming album to be released in early 2026 and also teased a new tour, which would be named after his song, "My Kinda Saturday Night". On October 9, 2025, Combs officially announced his My Kinda Saturday Night Tour, which began on March 21, 2026, in Paradise, Nevada, at Allegiant Stadium and is set to conclude on August 2, 2026, in London, at Wembley Stadium.

On December 5, 2025, Combs released a new promotional single titled "Giving Her Away".

Combs officially announced The Way I Am and its March 20, 2026 release date on January 7, 2026, alongside the release of a promotional single, "Sleepless in a Hotel Room".

"Be By You" was released on February 13, 2026, as the seventh promotional single from the album, which was sent to country radio on May 5, 2026, as the album's fourth single. Alongside the song's release in February, Combs announced the album's track list. On March 13, 2026, one week before the album's release, "I Ain't No Cowboy", the album's eighth promotional single, was released.

== Critical reception ==
Professional ratings
Aggregate scores
Source	Rating
Metacritic	70/100
Review scores
Source	Rating
AllMusic	3.5/5 stars
Country Central	8.4/10
Hot Press	7.5/10
The Irish Times	2/5 stars
Mojo	3/5 stars
Paste	C+
Pitchfork	7/10
Rolling Stone	3.5/5 stars
Stereoboard	3/5 stars
Uncut	9/10

According to the review aggregator Metacritic, The Way I Am received "generally favorable reviews" based on a weighted average score of 70 out of 100 from 6 critic scores.

James Christopher Monger of AllMusic gave the album three-and-a-half stars out of five as he described the album as one that "crystallizes that primal need for grounding via an assured set of songs rooted in themes of family, gratitude, mental health, and retaining authenticity amid the chaos of fame," while highlighting notable tracks like "Days Like These", "Sleepless in a Hotel Room", and "Back in the Saddle". Aishwarya Rajan of Country Central rated the album 8.4 out of ten, calling The Way I Am "deeply personal" and "worth listening to over and over again". Elaine Rand of Hot Press praised Combs' ability to be an "everyman", specifically mentioning his ability to portray himself as "every man, such as a husband-to-be at the alter, a jilted ex, a new father, [and] an inmate behind bards".

In one of the more negative reviews, Ed Power of The Irish Times rated the album two stars out of five as he compared the project to the soulless inner workings of an AI bot while stating his music "feels about as authentic as a cowboy hat bought at the airport duty-free". In a similar vein, Andy Fyfe of Mojo gave the album three stars out of five and criticized some of the tracks for verging on the edge of "pure [porn]". Ethan Beck of Paste gave the album a C+ and praised Combs for not having any bad songs, but heavily criticized the album's 22-track length, stating "The Way I Am is a reminder of how helpful an editor can be. It is simply too much Luke Combs to know what to do with".

Stephen Thomas Erlewine of Pitchfork gave the album a seven out of ten, and while he critiqued the album's length, he also stated that "it seems churlish to complain about too much of a good thing". He also praised that any given song is "sharply crafted and unpretentious" and that The Way I Am isn't a comeback, but more of a demonstration of his strengths. Jonathan Bernstein of Rolling Stone gave the album three-and-a-half stars out of five and praised Combs' ability to deliver many different facets of his music. Jack Press of Stereoboard gave the same score as Rolling Stone, and like Beck of Paste, criticized the album's lack of editing and length, but praised the number of catchy tracks.

Melinda Newman and Jessica Nicholson of Billboard ranked "Miss You Here" as the album's worst song, and the lead single, "Back in the Saddle", as the album's best song.

== Commercial performance ==
The Way I Am debuted atop the Billboard Top Country Albums chart and number two on the Billboard 200 for the week dated April 4, 2026, with 101,000 equivalent album units earned in the United States. The album also featured 14 entries on the Billboard Hot Country Songs, including all of the album's already released songs, with the highest new song, "Rethink Some Things", reaching number 11.

The Way I Am marked Combs' seventh top-ten record on the Billboard 200 chart.

== Track listing ==
The Way I Am track listing
No.	Title	Writer(s)	Length
1.	"Back in the Saddle"	Luke Combs; Dan Isbell; Jonathan Singleton	3:33
2.	"My Kinda Saturday Night"	Combs; Singleton; Randy Montana	2:45
3.	"Days Like These"	Combs; Aaron Raitiere; Brent Cobb	3:41
4.	"15 Minutes"	Combs; Trey Pendley; Rob Pennington; Grant Vogel	3:35
5.	"Alcohol of Fame"	Combs; Dalton Dover; D. Isbell; Reid Isbell	3:25
6.	"Daytona 499"	Combs; Erik Dylan; Wyatt McCubbin; Drew Parker	3:03
7.	"The Way I Am"	Chris Gelbuda; Rob Snyder	4:08
8.	"Wish Upon a Whiskey"	Combs; D. Isbell; Parker	3:51
9.	"Soon as I Get Home"	Combs; Jessi Alexander; Tony Lane; Singleton	3:29
10.	"Rethink Some Things"	Combs; Jacob Davis; D. Isbell; R. Isbell	2:45
11.	"Giving Her Away"	Gary Garris; Josh Mirenda; Josh Phillips	3:33
12.	"Seeing Someone"	Combs; Ray Fulcher; Lalo Guzman; Michael Tyler; Allison Veltz-Cruz	3:27
13.	"Sleepless in a Hotel Room"	Combs; Montana; Singleton	2:57
14.	"I Ain't No Cowboy"	Combs; Cody Johnson; Jake Mears	3:13
15.	"Ever Mine" (featuring Alison Krauss)	Combs; Hailey Whitters; Charlie Worsham	3:38
16.	"Can't Tell Me I'm Wrong"	Combs; Fulcher; Pete Good; Lydia Vaughan	3:09
17.	"Miss You Here"	Combs; Thomas Archer; D. Isbell; Ben Stennis	3:04
18.	"Tell 'Em About Tonight"	Combs; Dylan; Fulcher; James McNair	3:41
19.	"Be By You"	Dan Alley; Sam Banks; Nick Walsh	3:17
20.	"The Me Part of You"	Combs; Jason Gantt; D. Isbell; R. Isbell	3:14
21.	"Rich Man"	Combs; Davis; Lori McKenna; Snyder	3:11
22.	"A Man Was Born"	Combs; Archer; Fulcher; Jordan Rowe; Tyler	2:34
Total length:			73:13

== Personnel ==
Credits adapted from Tidal.

- Luke Combs – lead vocals, production
- Chip Matthews – production, mixing, digital editing (all tracks); background vocals (tracks 1–14, 16–22), additional engineering (1, 2, 4–22),percussion (1, 2, 4, 5, 8–14, 17–21), electric guitar (1, 4, 10, 11, 13, 18, 19); acoustic guitar, engineering (3); baritone guitar (10)
- Jonathan Singleton – production (all tracks), background vocals (1–14, 16–22), electric guitar (1, 2, 10, 12, 13, 18–20, 22), percussion (1, 19), acoustic guitar (3)
- Steve Blackmon – engineering (1, 2, 4–22), digital editing (all tracks)
- Chris Vanoverberghe – engineering assistance (1, 2, 4–22)
- Michael Proctor – digital editing
- Benny Quinn – mastering
- Jerry Roe – drums (1, 2, 4–22), percussion (1, 2, 4–8, 10, 11, 20, 21)
- Steve Mackey – bass (1, 2, 4, 5, 7, 9–19)
- Rob McNelley – electric guitar (1, 2, 4–22), baritone guitar (14)
- Sol Philcox-Littlefield – electric guitar (1, 2, 5, 9, 10, 12, 16)
- Todd Lombardo – resonator guitar (1), acoustic guitar (2, 5–10, 12, 14, 16, 20–22), 12-string guitar (21)
- Dave Cohen – organ, piano (1, 2, 5, 7, 9, 10, 12); keyboards (16)
- Bryan Sutton – acoustic guitar (4, 11, 13, 15, 17–19), resonator guitar (13); banjo, mandolin (15)
- Jim "Moose" Brown – keyboards (4), organ (11, 13–15, 17–19), piano (14, 15, 19)
- Bobby Terry – pedal steel guitar (4, 6, 8, 11, 13, 15, 19, 21), electric guitar (17, 18, 20), slide guitar (17)
- Matt Maxwell – bass (6, 8, 20–22)
- Gordon Mote – organ (6, 8, 20–22), piano (6, 8, 21, 22), Wurlitzer piano (21)
- Kurt Ozan – pedal steel guitar (7)
- Joey Landreth – electric guitar (9)
- Alison Krauss – background vocals, fiddle (15)
- Rose Hutcheson – production management
- Scott Johnson – production management

== Charts ==
Chart performance for The Way I Am
Chart (2026)	Peak position
Australian Albums (ARIA)	3
Australian Country Albums (ARIA)	1
Austrian Albums (Ö3 Austria)	57
Belgian Albums (Ultratop Flanders)	156
Canadian Albums (Billboard)	2
Dutch Albums (Album Top 100)	18
German Albums (Offizielle Top 100)	77
Irish Albums (Official Charts)	8
New Zealand Albums (RMNZ)	4
Norwegian Albums (IFPI Norge)	10
Scottish Albums (Official Charts)	2
Swedish Albums (Sverigetopplistan)	46
UK Albums (Official Charts)	4
UK Country Albums (Official Charts)	1
US Billboard 200	2
US Top Country Albums (Billboard)	1

== Certifications and sales ==
Certifications for "The Way I Am"
Region	Certification	Certified units/sales
Canada (Music Canada)	2× Platinum	160,000^{‡}
United Kingdom (BPI)	Silver	60,000^{‡}
^{‡} Sales+streaming figures based on certification alone.
