= Back in the Saddle (Luke Combs song) =

Single by Luke Combs

from the album The Way I Am
- Released: July 28, 2025
- Genre: Country
- Length: 3:32
- Label: Sony; Seven Ridges
- Songwriters: Luke Combs; Dan Isbell; Jonathan Singleton
- Producers: Luke Combs; Chip Matthews; Jonathan Singleton

Luke Combs singles chronology
"Backup Plan" (2025)	"Back in the Saddle" (2025)	"Days Like These" (2025)

Music video
- "Back in the Saddle" on YouTube

"Back in the Saddle" is a song recorded by American country music singer Luke Combs. It was released on July 28, 2025, as the lead single from his sixth studio album, The Way I Am. Combs co-wrote the song with Dan Isbell and Jonathan Singleton, and co-produced it with Singleton and Chip Matthews.

== Background ==
Combs co-wrote "Back in the Saddle" with Dan Isbell and Jonathan Singleton. Lyrically, the song uses "cowboy-themed imagery" to describe a man seeking a return to form, which Combs described as autobiographical: "It’s about just me getting back to what I did when I first started doing music, saddling up, hitting the road, getting after it, just kinda getting back to it." It marks the end of a brief hiatus and his first solo single release since "Ain't No Love in Oklahoma" over a year prior. He first announced the song's release on his social media accounts on July 16, 2025.

The song was featured on the Madden NFL 26 soundtrack. The song also serves as the official opening theme for NASCAR on TNT for 2026.

== Music video ==
The music video for "Back in the Saddle" premiered alongside the song's digital release, and was directed by Tyler Adams. It was filmed at the Tri-County Speedway in Hudson, North Carolina, and features cameo appearances by Dale Earnhardt Jr. and Richard Petty, both of NASCAR fame.

== Commercial performance ==
"Back in the Saddle" debuted at number 11 on the Billboard Country Airplay chart week dated August 9, 2025. It marks the second-highest debut ever on the chart following "More Than a Memory" by Garth Brooks, which debuted at number one in 2007. In its sixth chart week, it became Combs' 24th consecutive top ten hit on the Country Airplay chart.

== Charts ==
=== Weekly charts ===
Weekly chart performance for "Back in the Saddle"
Chart (2025)	Peak position
Australia (ARIA)	72
Australia Country Hot 50 (The Music)	1
Canada Hot 100 (Billboard)	31
Canada Country (Billboard)	1
Global 200 (Billboard)	179
New Zealand Hot Singles (RMNZ)	4
US Billboard Hot 100	22
US Country Airplay (Billboard)	1
US Hot Country Songs (Billboard)	4

=== Year-end charts ===
Year-end chart performance for "Back in the Saddle"
Chart (2025)	Position
US Country Airplay (Billboard)	51
US Hot Country Songs (Billboard)	57
