= Days Like These (Luke Combs song) =

2025 song by Luke Combs

Single by Luke Combs

from the album The Way I Am
- Released: November 10, 2025
- Genre: Country
- Length: 3:41
- Label: Sony; Seven Ridges
- Songwriters: Luke Combs; Brent Cobb; Aaron Raitiere
- Producers: Luke Combs; Chip Matthews; Jonathan Singleton

Luke Combs singles chronology
"Back in the Saddle" (2025)	"Days Like These" (2025)	"Sleepless in a Hotel Room" (2026)

"Days Like These" is a song by American country music singer Luke Combs. It was released to country radio on November 10, 2025, as the second single from his sixth studio album, The Way I Am. Combs wrote the song with Brent Cobb and Aaron Raitiere and produced it with Chip Matthews and Jonathan Singleton.

== Background ==
Combs first posted a video of himself performing the song on YouTube on November 25, 2022. On September 18, 2025, he teased a studio version of the song on Instagram while assuring fans that he had not forgotten about it.

== Composition ==
The song backed only by an acoustic guitar. Lyrically, Combs reflects on enjoying days that are characterized by the simplicities of life, especially expressing gratitude for being surrounded by his loved ones. He notes that money cannot buy the happiness that these days bring him.

== Critical reception ==
Maxim Mower of Holler gave the song a positive review, writing that Combs provides "enchanting vocals" and describing him as "lacing every lyric with a sense of compelling sincerity."

== Chart performance ==
"Days Like These" peaked at number two on the Billboard Country Airplay chart for the week ending May 2, 2026, behind Combs' own "Sleepless in a Hotel Room". It became Combs' first single to miss the top spot since his 2023 single "Where the Wild Things Are", and his third overall. This was also the second time that Combs held the top two positions on the chart, having first accomplished this in September 2023 with "Love You Anyway" and "Fast Car".

The song also spent one week number one on the Mediabase Country chart making this Combs' 25th number one single. It would then be displaced by "Sleepless in a Hotel Room". making Combs the first artist to replace himself at number one with solo songs.

== Charts ==
Chart performance for "Days Like These"
Chart (2025–2026)	Peak position
Canada Hot 100 (Billboard)	31
Canada Country (Billboard)	1
New Zealand Hot Singles (RMNZ)	6
Canada Country (Billboard)	51
US Billboard Hot 100	31
US Country Airplay (Billboard)	2
US Hot Country Songs (Billboard)	9

== Certifications ==
Certifications for "Days Like These"
Region	Certification	Certified units/sales
Canada (Music Canada)	Platinum	80,000^{‡}
^{‡} Sales+streaming figures based on certification alone.
