= Jessi Alexander =

American musician (born 1976)

- Born: Jessica Leigh Alexander; November 18, 1976 (age 49)
- Origin: Jackson, Tennessee
- Genre: Country
- Occupation: Singer-songwriter
- Instruments: Guitar, vocals
- Years active: 2004—present
- Label: Columbia
- Spouse: Jon Randall (m. 2006)

Jessica Leigh Alexander-Stewart (née Alexander; born November 18, 1976) is an American country music singer-songwriter. A four-time Grammy Award nominee, she won both the Country Music Association Award for Song of the Year and the Academy of Country Music Award for Song of the Year for co-writing Lee Brice's 2012 single "I Drive Your Truck". In 2025, she received her first nomination for the Grammy Award for Songwriter of the Year, Non-Classical for her work on releases by Luke Combs, Dustin Lynch, Jelly Roll, Cody Johnson, Megan Moroney, Conner Smith, and Hailey Whitters.

== Career ==
She has had her songs recorded by Patty Loveless, Trisha Yearwood and Little Big Town. She also launched her own recording career in 2004. Two of her songs charted on Billboard's Hot Country Songs chart, and Columbia Records released her debut album, Honeysuckle Sweet, on March 1, 2005. In 2006, she was dropped from the label.

Alexander co-wrote Miley Cyrus' single "The Climb", for the 2009 film Hannah Montana: The Movie and the Hannah Montana song "I'll Always Remember You" from the Hannah Montana Forever soundtrack. She also co-wrote Lee Brice's 2012 single "I Drive Your Truck", and Blake Shelton's "Drink on It", "Mine Would Be You" and "Turnin' Me On".

In 2021, Jessi was featured on "That Was Us" from the album Behind the Bar by Riley Green.

== Personal life ==
She has been married to Jon Randall since 2006 and they have three children.

== Discography ==
=== Albums ===
Title	Album details
Honeysuckle Sweet	Release date: March 1, 2005; Label: Columbia Records
Down Home	Release date: April 1, 2014; Label: Lonesome Vinyl
Decatur County Red	Release date: March 27, 2020; Label: Lost Creek

=== Singles ===
Year	Single	Peak positions	Album
Year	Single	US Country	Album
2004	"Honeysuckle Sweet"	52	Honeysuckle Sweet
2004	"Make Me Stay or Make Me Go"	57	Honeysuckle Sweet
2005	"Canyon Prayer"	—	Honeysuckle Sweet
2020	"Mama Drank"	—	Decatur County Red
2020	"I Should Probably Go Now"	—	Decatur County Red
2020	"Decatur County Red"	—	Decatur County Red
2020	"River"	—	TBD
"—" denotes releases that did not chart

=== Music videos ===
Year	Video	Director
2004	"Honeysuckle Sweet"	Roger Pistole
2005	"Canyon Prayer"	Kristin Barlowe

=== Singles written by Alexander ===
Year	Title	Artist(s)
2004	"I Wanna Believe"	Patty Loveless
2009	"The Climb"	Miley Cyrus
2011	"When Love Gets a Hold of You"	Reba McEntire
2012	"Drink on It"	Blake Shelton
2012	"I Drive Your Truck"	Lee Brice
2013	"Mine Would Be You"	Blake Shelton
2014	"Song About a Girl"	Eric Paslay
2014	"PrizeFighter"	Trisha Yearwood feat. Kelly Clarkson
2015	"Winning Streak"	Ashley Monroe
2015	"If Love Was Fair"	Ashley Monroe
2015	"If the Devil Don't Want Me"	Ashley Monroe
2015	"I'm Good at Leavin'"	Ashley Monroe
2016	"Savior's Shadow"	Blake Shelton
2016	"The Way I Talk"	Morgan Wallen
2018	"Turnin' Me On"	Blake Shelton
2020	"Young Enough"	Brett Kissel
2020	"Like a Man"	Dallas Smith
2021	"Never Say Never"	Cole Swindell and Lainey Wilson
2021	"Sunrise Tells the Story"	Midland
2024	"Ain't No Love in Oklahoma"	Luke Combs
2026	"Lighter"	Jelly Roll and Carín León

== Awards and nominations ==
Year	Association	Category	Nominated work	Result
2013	Country Music Association	Song of the Year	"I Drive Your Truck"	Won
2013	Grammy Awards	Best Country Song	"I Drive Your Truck"	Nominated
2013	Grammy Awards	Best Country Song	"Mine Would Be You"	Nominated
2013	Academy of Country Music Awards	Song of the Year	"Mine Would Be You"	Nominated
2013	Academy of Country Music Awards	Song of the Year	"I Drive Your Truck"	Won
2024	Grammy Awards	Songwriter of the Year, Non-Classical	"Ain't No Love in Oklahoma", "All I Ever Do Is Leave", "Chevrolet", "Make Me a Mop", "Never Left Me", "No Caller ID", "Noah", "Remember Him That Way", "Roulette on the Heart"	Nominated
2024	Grammy Awards	Best Song Written for Visual Media	"Ain't No Love in Oklahoma"	Nominated
