= Sleepless in a Hotel Room =

2026 single by Luke Combs

Single by Luke Combs

from the album The Way I Am
- Released: January 26, 2026
- Genre: Country
- Length: 2:57
- Label: Sony; Seven Ridges
- Songwriters: Luke Combs; Randy Montana; Jonathan Singleton
- Producers: Luke Combs; Jonathan Singleton

Luke Combs singles chronology
"Days Like These" (2025)	"Sleepless in a Hotel Room" (2026)	"Be By You" (2026)

"Sleepless in a Hotel Room" is a song by American country music singer Luke Combs, released on January 26, 2026, as the third single from his sixth studio album, The Way I Am. Combs wrote the song with Randy Montana and Jonathan Singleton and produced it with Singleton.

== Background ==
Luke Combs wrote the song about missing his girlfriend (and later wife) Nicole Hocking in 2020, right before the COVID-19 lockdowns. When he was unable to take a nap before his performance at the 2020 Billboard Music Awards, he was reminded of the song and shared an acoustic version on social media. He previewed a studio recording of the song in December 2025, before releasing it in the following month.

== Composition ==
The song contains electric guitars and drums. Lyrically, Luke Combs explores his loneliness in a hotel room as he misses his wife while on tour. He compares it to wind howling outside his window, and describes watching television at 2 a.m., being wide awake and dreaming of being in her company.

== Chart performance ==
"Sleepless in a Hotel Room" peaked at number one on the Billboard Country Airplay chart for the week ending April 18, 2026, making this Combs' 20th number one single. Two weeks later, his previous single, "Days Like These", peaked at number two, making this the second time that Combs simultaneously held the top two positions on the chart, and the third time overall that any act has accomplished this feat. He first accomplished this in September 2023 with "Love You Anyway" and "Fast Car". The song held the top spot for five weeks.

It also reached number one on the Mediabase country chart making this Combs' 26th number one following "Days Like These". Not only was this the second time that Combs replaced himself at number one (The first time was in February 2024 between Riley Green and Combs' "Different 'Round Here" and Combs' own "Where the Wild Things Are"), But it also made Combs the first country artist to replace himself at number one with solo songs.

== Charts ==
Chart performance for "Sleepless in a Hotel Room"
Chart (2026)	Peak position
Australia (ARIA)	19
Canada Hot 100 (Billboard)	14
Canada Country (Billboard)	1
Global 200 (Billboard)	64
Ireland (IRMA)	43
Norway (IFPI Norge)	37
Sweden Heatseeker (Sverigetopplistan)	6
UK Country Airplay (Radiomonitor)	3
US Billboard Hot 100	11
US Country Airplay (Billboard)	1
US Hot Country Songs (Billboard)	2

== Certifications ==
Certifications for "Sleepless In A Hotel Room"
Region	Certification	Certified units/sales
Canada (Music Canada)	2× Platinum	160,000^{‡}
New Zealand (RMNZ)	Gold	15,000^{‡}
^{‡} Sales+streaming figures based on certification alone.
