= Ain't No Love in Oklahoma =

Single by Luke Combs

from the album Twisters: The Album
- Released: May 20, 2024
- Genre: Country rock
- Length: 3:30
- Label: Columbia; Atlantic
- Songwriters: Jessi Alexander; Luke Combs; Jonathan Singleton
- Producers: Luke Combs; Chip Matthews; Jonathan Singleton

Luke Combs singles chronology
"Where the Wild Things Are" (2023)	"Ain't No Love in Oklahoma" (2024)	"Guy for That" (2024)

Music video
- "Ain't No Love in Oklahoma" on YouTube

"Ain't No Love in Oklahoma" is a song recorded by American country music singer Luke Combs. It was released on May 20, 2024, as the lead single from Twisters: The Album, the soundtrack album for the 2024 movie Twisters. Combs co-wrote the song with Jessi Alexander and Jonathan Singleton, and co-produced it with Singleton and Chip Matthews.

== Background ==
Combs co-wrote the song with Jessi Alexander and Jonathan Singleton specifically for the film Twisters, a present-day chapter of the 1996 film Twister. Described as a "country-rocker", the lyrics describe both the dangers of storm chasing and the thrill of the chase. In an interview with Audacy, Inc., Combs said that "this song is about everything that I think this movie is about. High-energy, high-octane, I think the song really musically matches that vibe. It's really sort of abstract, lyrically speaking, I think that was done intentionally. We were really just trying to sonically match the vibe that they were looking for with this film."

== Music video ==
The music video for "Ain't No Love in Oklahoma" was directed by Alex Bittan and premiered on May 16, 2024. The video features footage from Twisters interspersed with stormy performance footage of Combs singing the song. The video also features a cameo from NASCAR driver John Hunter Nemechek.

== Commercial performance ==
"Ain't No Love in Oklahoma" debuted at number 24 on the Billboard Country Airplay chart week dated May 25, 2024. It reached number one in September 2024, giving Combs his 18th number one hit on the chart.

== Charts ==
=== Weekly charts ===
Weekly chart performance for "Ain't No Love in Oklahoma"
Chart (2024–2025)	Peak position
Australia (ARIA)	19
Australia Country Hot 50 (The Music)	16
Canada Hot 100 (Billboard)	13
Canada Country (Billboard)	1
Global 200 (Billboard)	35
Ireland (IRMA)	54
New Zealand (Recorded Music NZ)	16
Sweden Heatseeker (Sverigetopplistan)	11
UK Singles (Official Charts)	50
US Billboard Hot 100	13
US Country Airplay (Billboard)	1
US Hot Country Songs (Billboard)	3

=== Year-end charts ===
2024 year-end chart performance for "Ain't No Love In Oklahoma"
Chart (2024)	Position
Canada (Canadian Hot 100)	30
Global 200 (Billboard)	187
US Billboard Hot 100	37
US Country Airplay (Billboard)	13
US Hot Country Songs (Billboard)	13

2025 year-end chart performance for "Ain't No Love In Oklahoma"
Chart (2025)	Position
Australia (ARIA)	43
Canada Country (Billboard)	69
US Hot Country Songs (Billboard)	95

== Certifications ==
Certifications for "Ain't No Love in Oklahoma"
Region	Certification	Certified units/sales
Australia (ARIA)	2× Platinum	140,000^{‡}
New Zealand (RMNZ)	2× Platinum	60,000^{‡}
United Kingdom (BPI)	Silver	200,000^{‡}
United States (RIAA)	3× Platinum	3,000,000^{‡}
^{‡} Sales+streaming figures based on certification alone.
