= Rethink Some Things =

2026 song by Luke Combs

Single by Luke Combs

from the album The Way I Am
- Released: July 13, 2026
- Genre: Country
- Length: 2:45
- Label: Sony; Seven Ridges
- Songwriters: Luke Combs; Jacob Davis; Dan Isbell; Reid Isbell
- Producers: Luke Combs; Jonathan Singleton; Chip Matthews

Luke Combs singles chronology
"Be by You" (2026)	"Rethink Some Things" (2026)	"Miss You Here" (2026)

"Rethink Some Things" is a song by American country music singer Luke Combs. It was released on July 13, 2026 as the fifth single from his sixth studio album, The Way I Am. Combs co-wrote the song alongside Jacob Davis, Dan Isbell, and Reid Isbell and co-produced the song alongside Jonathan Singleton and Chip Matthews.

== Background ==
Combs teased the track in January 2026 alongside future promotional single "Be By You". Whiskey Riff called the song a "super sultry, groovy, and almost Motown-esque song that finds him torn between his head and his heart."

Holler described the song as "steamy and sensual".

== Critical reception ==
Melinda Newman and Jessica Nicholson of Billboard ranked the song as the tenth-best song from the album.

== Personnel ==
Credits adapted from Tidal.

=== Musicians ===
- Luke Combs – lead vocals
- Todd Lombardo – acoustic guitar
- Chip Matthews – background vocals, percussion, electric guitar, baritone guitar
- Jonathan Singleton – background vocals, electric guitar
- Rob McNelley – baritone guitar, electric guitar
- Steve Mackey – bass
- Jerry Roe – drums, percussion
- Jim "Moose" Brown – organ, piano
- Sol Philcox-Littlefield – electric guitar
- Todd Lombardo – acoustic guitar
- Dave Cohen – organ, piano

=== Technical ===
- Luke Combs – production
- Chip Matthews – production, editing, mixing, additional engineer
- Jonathan Singleton – production
- Chris Vanoverberghe – assistant recording
- Michael Proctor – editing
- Steve Blackmon – editing, recording
- Benny Quinn – mastering

== Charts ==
Chart performance for "Rethink Some Things"
Chart (2026)	Peak position
Canada Hot 100 (Billboard)	39
Canada CHR/Top 40 (Billboard)	39
Canada Country (Billboard)	2
Global 200 (Billboard)	168
New Zealand Hot Singles (RMNZ)	5
UK Singles (Official Charts)	71
US Billboard Hot 100	29
US Country Airplay (Billboard)	5
US Hot Country Songs (Billboard)	10

== Certifications ==
Certifications for "Rethink Some Things"
Region	Certification	Certified units/sales
Canada (Music Canada)	Gold	40,000^{‡}
^{‡} Sales+streaming figures based on certification alone.
