= Be By You =

2026 song by Luke Combs

Single by Luke Combs

from the album The Way I Am
- Released: May 5, 2026
- Genre: Country
- Length: 3:17
- Label: Sony; Seven Ridges
- Songwriters: Dan Alley; Sam Banks; Nick Walsh
- Producers: Luke Combs; Jonathan Singleton; Chip Matthews

Luke Combs singles chronology
"Sleepless in a Hotel Room" (2026)	"Be By You" (2026)	"Rethink Some Things" (2026)

"Be By You" is a song by American country music singer Luke Combs. It was released as the fourth single from his sixth studio album, The Way I Am, on February 13, 2026; it was released on May 5 as the fourth official single. It was written by Dan Alley, Sam Banks, and Nick Walsh and produced by Combs himself, Jonathan Singleton, and Chip Matthews.

== Composition ==
The song draws heavily from traditional country influences. It is built on a guitar riff, over which Luke Combs sings about wanting to be with his wife, Nicole, regardless of his situation or surroundings. The lyrics use bucolic imagery, including a johnboat on a lake full of largemouth bass and a holler accompanied by rustling wind, among the settings where they may spend time together. In addition, the title "Be By You" employs wordplay on the term bayou.

== Commercial performance ==
According to Luminate, the song earned 13.6 million official U.S. streams and 254,000 in radio audience impressions and sold 5,000 units in the tracking week of February 13–19, 2026.

== Charts ==
Chart performance for "Be By You"
Chart (2026)	Peak position
Australia (ARIA)	33
Canada Hot 100 (Billboard)	17
Canada Country (Billboard)	1
Global 200 (Billboard)	36
Ireland (IRMA)	74
New Zealand Hot Singles (RMNZ)	1
Sweden Heatseeker (Sverigetopplistan)	16
UK Singles (Official Charts)	47
US Billboard Hot 100	12
US Country Airplay (Billboard)	1
US Hot Country Songs (Billboard)	2

== Certifications ==
Certifications for "Be By You"
Region	Certification	Certified units/sales
Canada (Music Canada)	2× Platinum	160,000^{‡}
New Zealand (RMNZ)	Gold	15,000^{‡}
^{‡} Sales+streaming figures based on certification alone.
