= Where the Wild Things Are (song) =

Single by Luke Combs

from the album Gettin' Old
- Released: October 16, 2023
- Genre: Country
- Length: 3:59
- Label: Columbia; River House
- Songwriters: Randy Montana; Dave Turnbull
- Producers: Chip Matthews; Luke Combs; Jonathan Singleton

Luke Combs singles chronology
"Life Goes On" (2023)	"Where the Wild Things Are" (2023)	"Ain't No Love in Oklahoma" (2024)

"Where the Wild Things Are" is a song written by Randy Montana and Dave Turnbull, and recorded by American country music singer Luke Combs. It was released on October 16, 2023 as the third single from his fourth studio album Gettin' Old.

== History and content ==
Songwriters Randy Montana and Dave Turnbull wrote "Where the Wild Things Are" several years prior to it being recorded by Combs. According to Combs in an interview with the blog Country Now, the song was originally submitted to Eric Church, who declined to record it. Billy Dukes of Taste of Country thought the song had "outlaw" imagery and noted it to be one of the few "storytelling" songs in Combs's discography.

== Commercial performance ==
"Where the Wild Things Are" peaked at number three on the Billboard Country Airplay chart in late February 2024, becoming Combs's second single to miss the number one spot on that chart, and with a number four peak on Hot Country Songs, it was his first single to miss the top spot on either. It did, however, reach number one on the Canada Country chart.

== Charts ==
=== Weekly charts ===
Weekly chart performance for "Where the Wild Things Are"
Chart (2023–2026)	Peak position
Australia (ARIA)	24
Australia Country Hot 50 (The Music)	14
Canada Hot 100 (Billboard)	26
Canada Country (Billboard)	1
Global 200 (Billboard)	108
Ireland (IRMA)	14
Sweden Heatseeker (Sverigetopplistan)	7
UK Singles (Official Charts)	37
UK Country Airplay (Radiomonitor)	18
US Billboard Hot 100	26
US Country Airplay (Billboard)	3
US Hot Country Songs (Billboard)	4

=== Year-end charts ===
2024 year-end chart performance for "Where the Wild Things Are"
Chart (2024)	Position
Australia (ARIA)	68
Canada (Canadian Hot 100)	69
Global 200 (Billboard)	196
US Billboard Hot 100	70
US Country Airplay (Billboard)	39
US Hot Country Songs (Billboard)	14

2025 year-end chart performance for "Where the Wild Things Are"
Chart (2025)	Position
Australia (ARIA)	70

== Certifications ==
Certifications for "Where the Wild Things Are"
Region	Certification	Certified units/sales
Australia (ARIA)	3× Platinum	210,000^{‡}
Canada (Music Canada)	Platinum	80,000^{‡}
New Zealand (RMNZ)	Platinum	30,000^{‡}
United Kingdom (BPI)	Platinum	600,000^{‡}
United States (RIAA)	4× Platinum	4,000,000^{‡}
^{‡} Sales+streaming figures based on certification alone.
