= Jonathan Singleton =

American singer-songwriter

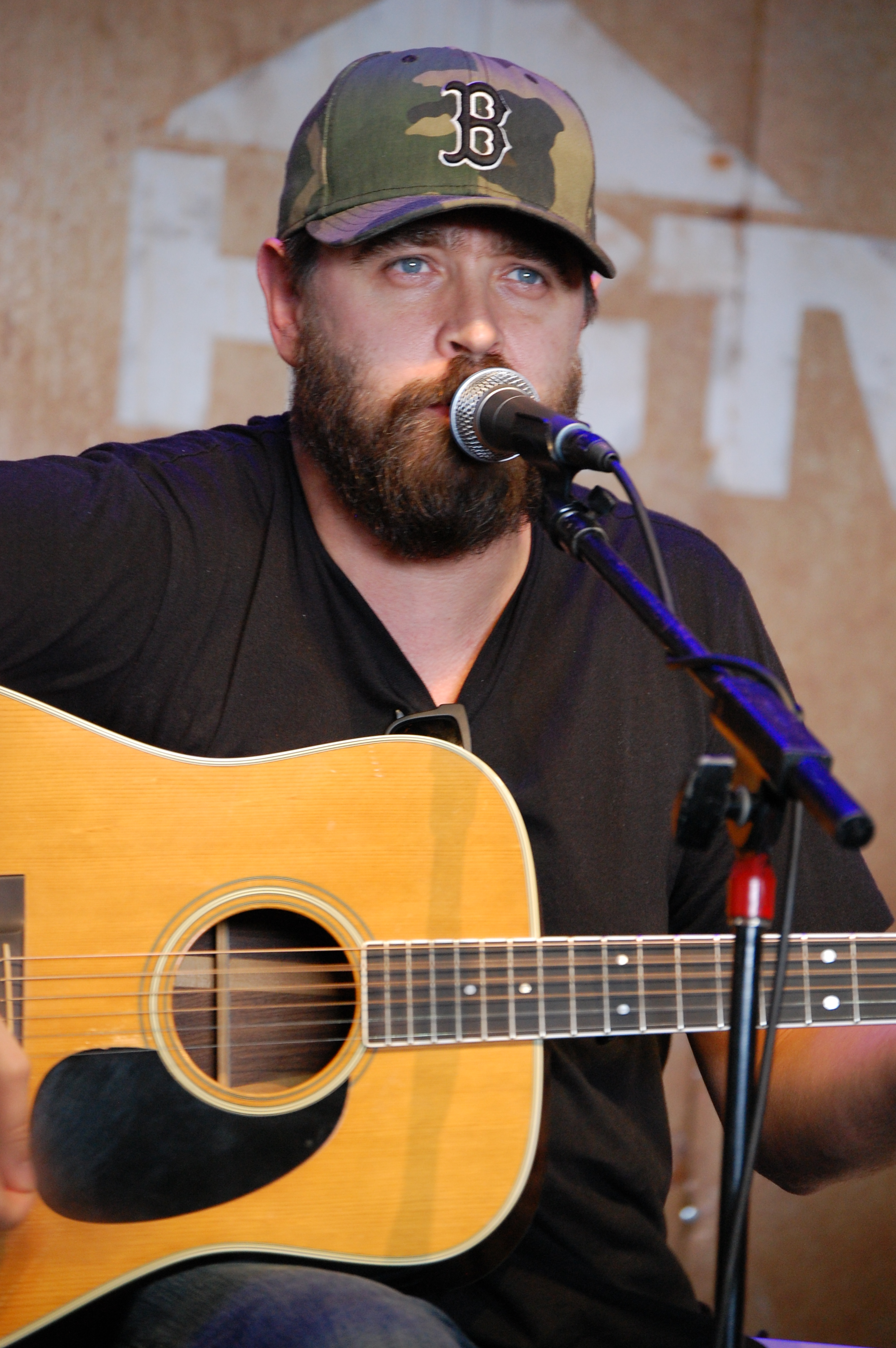

Background information
- Born: Jonathan David Singleton; July 11, 1978 (age 47)
- Origin: Jackson, TN USA
- Genres: Country
- Years active: 2008–present
- Label: Show Dog-Universal Music
- Formerly of: Jonathan Singleton & the Grove

Jonathan David Singleton is an American country music singer and songwriter who resides in Nashville, Tennessee. He has been nominated for 2 Grammy Awards, and has won the ACM Song of The Year Award in 2022 for “Things a Man Oughtta Know” by Lainey Wilson, and the CMA Album of the Year in 2022 for co-producing Luke Combs' album “Growin' Up.". He is known for co-writing the songs "Don't" by Billy Currington, "Watching Airplanes" by Gary Allan, "A Guy Walks Into a Bar" by Tyler Farr, "Red Light" and "Let It Rain" by David Nail, "Why Don't We Just Dance" by Josh Turner, "Diamond Rings and Old Barstools" by Tim McGraw, and "Beer Never Broke My Heart" by Luke Combs. More recently, Singleton co-wrote the number one hits "Die from a Broken Heart" by Maddie & Tae, "I Hope You're Happy Now" by Carly Pearce and Lee Brice (also co-written by Combs), and "In Between" by Scotty McCreery. In 2009, the American Society of Composers, Publishers and Authors (ASCAP) awarded Singleton for "Don't," which was one of the most-played country music songs of that year.

In 2009, he founded a band called Jonathan Singleton & the Grove, in which he sang lead vocals. The band also consisted of William Coats (drums, background vocals), Andy Dixon (bass guitar, background vocals), Justin Dudley (keyboards), Dustin Nunley (rhythm guitar, background vocals) and Josh Smith (rhythm guitar, background vocals). They signed to Universal South Records (now Show Dog-Universal Music) in March 2009 and released the single "Livin' in Paradise" that month. It debuted at No. 60 on the country charts for the week of April 4, 2009, and peaked at No. 48. A second single, "Look Who's Back in Love" debuted at No. 56 on the country charts for the week of December 26, 2009. The band's song "I'm Afraid of Storms" is included in soundtrack to the 2012 video game Silent Hill: Downpour.

== Jonathan Singleton & the Grove discography ==
=== Studio albums ===
Title	Album details
Jonathan Singleton & the Grove	Release date: May 11, 2010; Label: Show Dog-Universal Music

=== Singles ===
Year	Single	Peak positions	Album
Year	Single	US Country	Album
2009	"Livin' in Paradise"	48	single only
2009	"Look Who's Back in Love"	47	Jonathan Singleton & the Grove

=== Music videos ===
Year	Video	Director
2010	"Look Who's Back in Love"	Peter Zavadil
