= List of Billboard number-one country songs of 2024 =

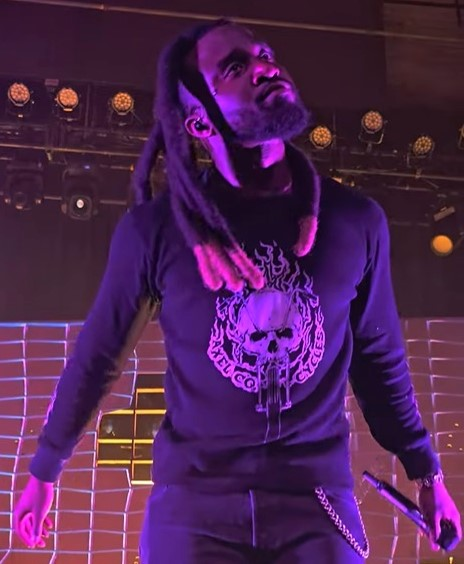
Shaboozey spent 27 weeks at number one on Hot Country Songs in 2024 with "A Bar Song (Tipsy)".

Hot Country Songs and Country Airplay are charts that rank the top-performing country songs in the United States, published by Billboard magazine. Hot Country Songs ranks songs based on digital downloads, streaming, and airplay from radio stations of all formats, a methodology introduced in 2012. Country Airplay, which was first published in 2012, is based solely on country radio airplay, a methodology that had previously been used from 1990 to 2012 for Hot Country Songs. In 2024, 5 different songs topped the Hot Country Songs chart and 29 different songs topped Country Airplay in 52 issues of the magazine.

The year began with "I Remember Everything" by Zach Bryan featuring Kacey Musgraves at number one on the Hot Country Songs chart and Nate Smith's "World on Fire" topping the Country Airplay listing, both songs retaining that position from the last issue of 2023. Both songs remained at number one throughout January, with the latter retaining its position on the airplay chart throughout the entirety of February as well. In the issue dated February 24, Beyoncé, a singer primarily associated with R&B and pop music, gained her first country number one when "Texas Hold 'Em" topped Hot Country Songs, making her the first African-American female artist to achieve a chart-topper in the genre. After ten weeks in the top spot, it was displaced by "A Bar Song (Tipsy)" by Shaboozey, who had guested on Beyoncé's 2024 album Cowboy Carter. It was his first country number one and marked the first time that two African-American artists had topped the listing back-to-back in its 66-year history. In the issue dated May 25, Post Malone, another singer not traditionally associated with country music, gained his first number one in the genre when "I Had Some Help", featuring Morgan Wallen, topped Hot Country Songs; it was the first of six songs by Wallen to top one or both charts during 2024. Every song to top the Hot Country Songs listing during the year also topped Billboard's all-genre multimetric songs chart, the Hot 100, highlighting country music's unprecedented level of mainstream success in 2024. In November, "A Bar Song (Tipsy)" tied the record for the longest-running number one in the history of the Hot 100.

In the issue dated February 24, "World on Fire" logged its tenth consecutive week atop Country Airplay, tying the record for the longest-running number one based solely on country radio plays held by Wallen's 2022 song "You Proof". A week later, it was replaced by Warren Zeiders' debut single "Pretty Little Poison", the first of eight consecutive one-week chart-toppers. It was the first debut single to top the chart since Smith's "Whiskey on You" thirteen months earlier. In April, Chayce Beckham, winner of the 2021 season of TV's American Idol, gained his first number one with "23". It was the first country radio number one to be solely written by the singer who performed it since Taylor Swift's "Ours" in 2012. In July, Ernest achieved his first number one as a performer when he collaborated with Wallen on "Cowgirls"; Ernest had written nine previous number ones for other artists. The song displaced "I Had Some Help" at the top, making it the first time since 2002 that an act scored back-to-back number one singles based on country radio play, and only the second time that such a distinction had been accomplished since Billboard began publishing a chart based on airplay on country stations in 1990. In December, four artists gained their first number ones by topping Country Airplay, beginning with Ella Langley, who reached the peak position for the first time with "You Look Like You Love Me", featuring Riley Green; it was the first song with a female lead artist to top the airplay listing in over a year. A week later, "Cowboy Songs" gave George Birge his first chart-topper, and the following week "High Road" by Koe Wetzel and Jessie Murph was the debut number one for both singers. In contrast to the artists reaching number one for the first time, when Kenny Chesney topped Country Airplay with "Take Her Home" in June it extended his own record for the most number ones based on plays at country music radio to 33 over a span of 27 years. Three months later, Blake Shelton scored his 29th number-one single when his collaboration with Malone, "Pour Me a Drink", reached number one, tying him with Tim McGraw for the second-most number ones based on airplay.

== Chart history ==
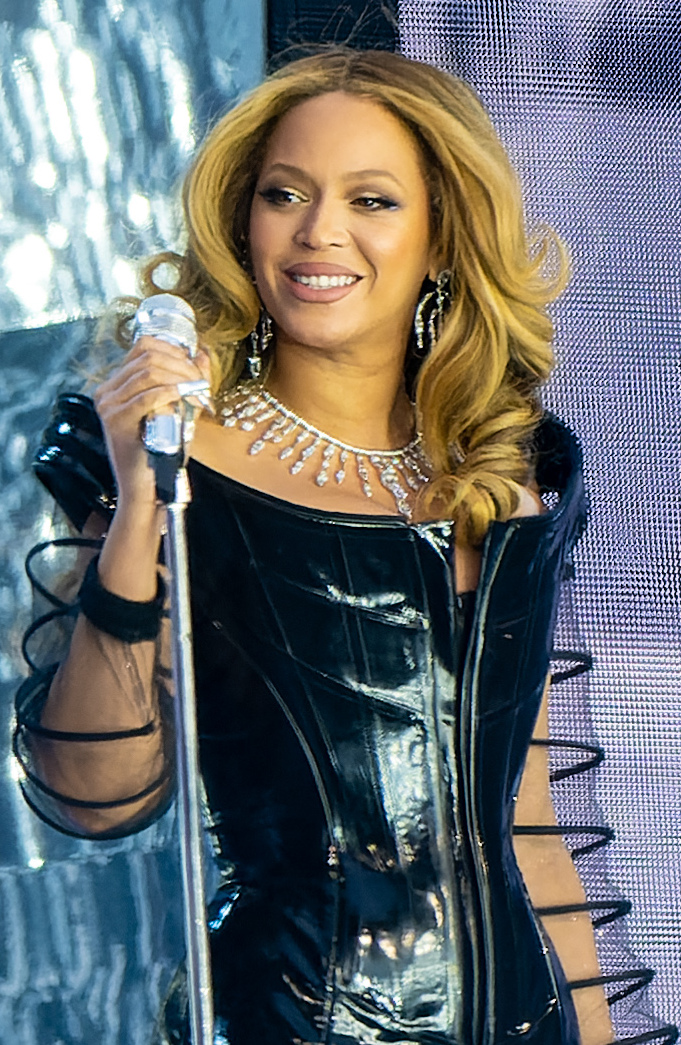
In February, Beyoncé became the first female African-American artist ever to achieve a number-one country song.

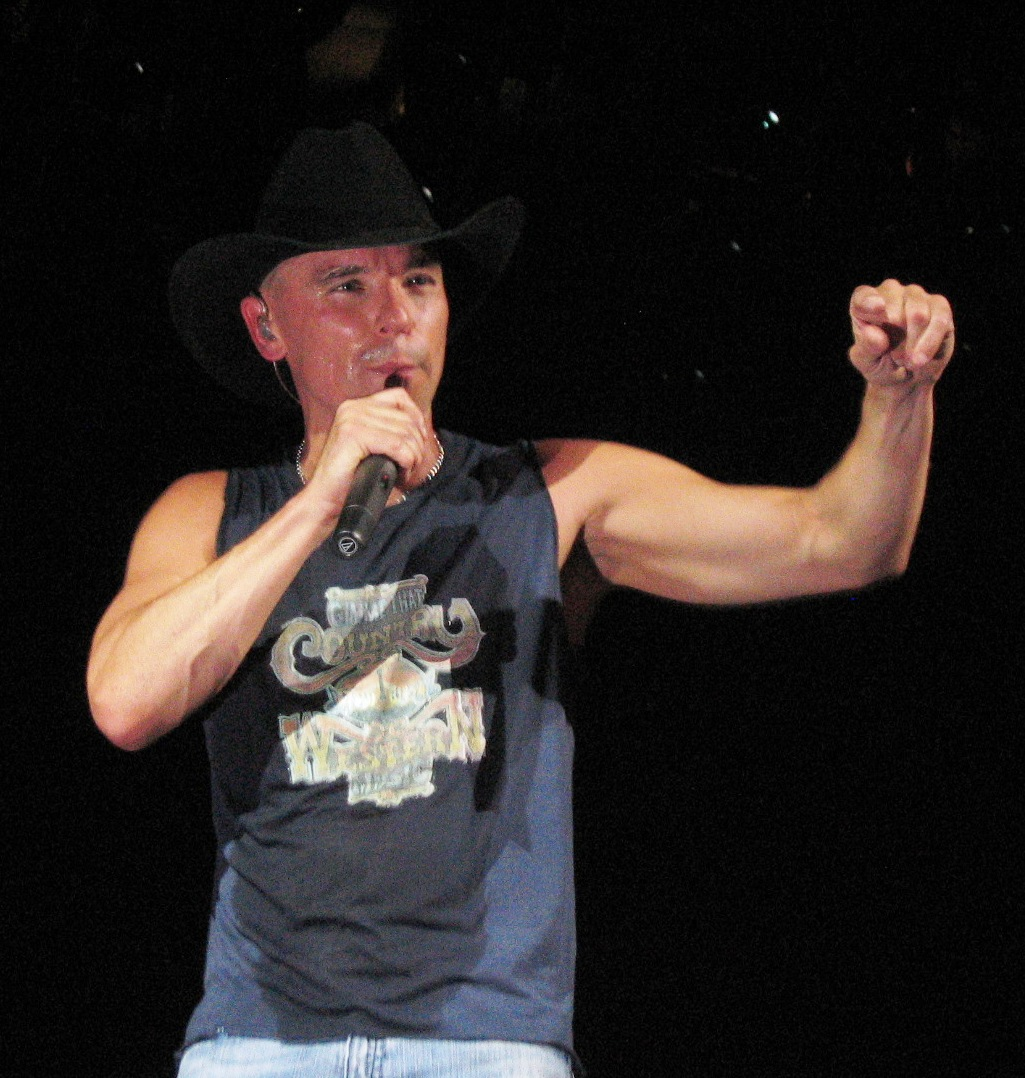
Kenny Chesney (pictured in 2007) extended his record for the greatest number of chart-toppers based on country radio airplay.

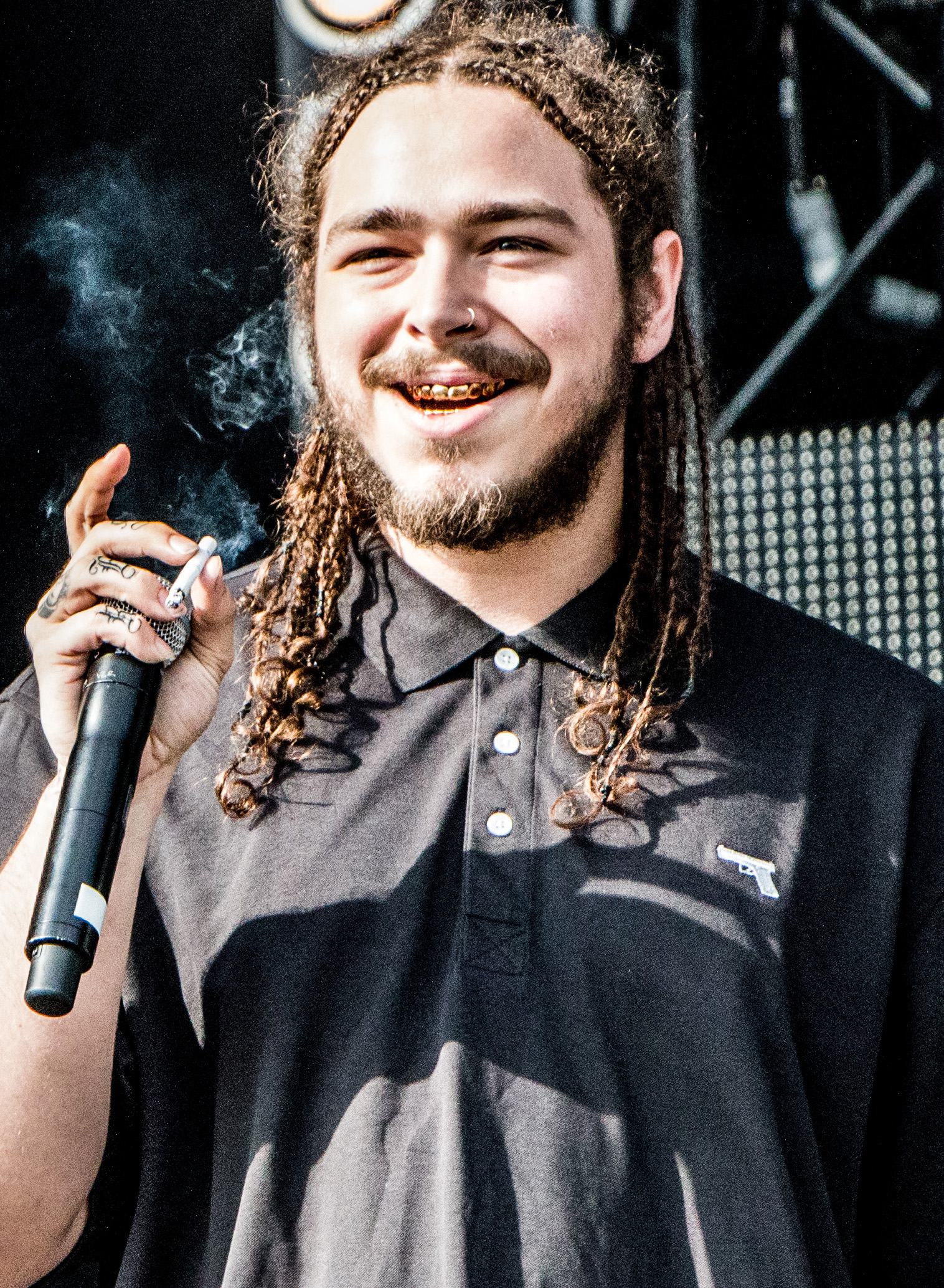
Post Malone (pictured in 2013) topped both charts with "I Had Some Help", featuring Morgan Wallen.

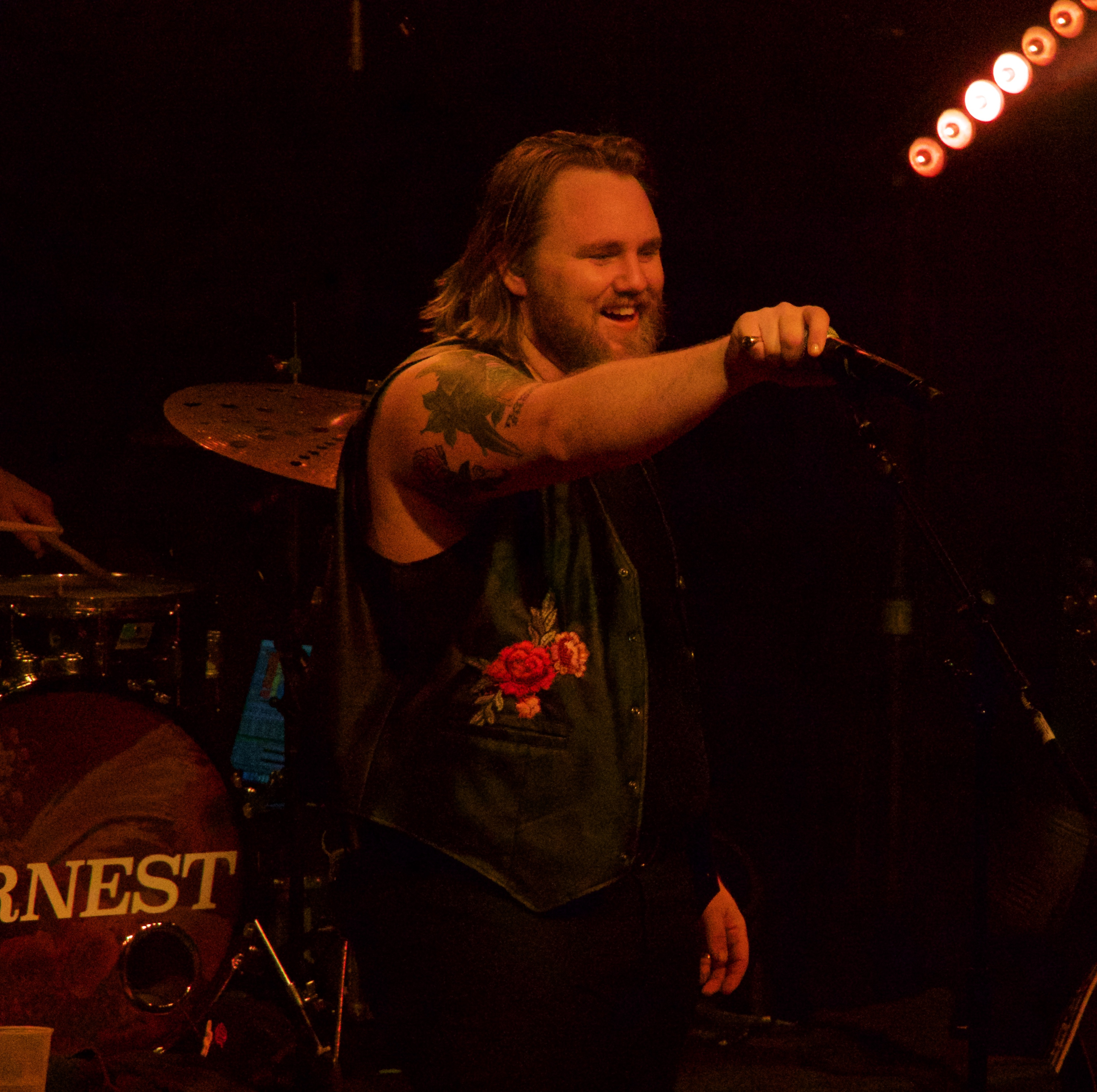
Having written nine number ones for other artists, Ernest gained his first chart-topper as a performer.

Chart history
Issue date	Hot Country Songs			Country Airplay		
Issue date	Title	Artist(s)	Ref.	Title	Artist(s)	Ref.
January 6	"I Remember Everything"	Zach Bryan featuring Kacey Musgraves		"World on Fire"	Nate Smith	
January 13	"I Remember Everything"	Zach Bryan featuring Kacey Musgraves		"World on Fire"	Nate Smith	
January 20	"I Remember Everything"	Zach Bryan featuring Kacey Musgraves		"World on Fire"	Nate Smith	
January 27	"I Remember Everything"	Zach Bryan featuring Kacey Musgraves		"World on Fire"	Nate Smith	
February 3	"I Remember Everything"	Zach Bryan featuring Kacey Musgraves		"World on Fire"	Nate Smith	
February 10	"I Remember Everything"	Zach Bryan featuring Kacey Musgraves		"World on Fire"	Nate Smith	
February 17	"I Remember Everything"	Zach Bryan featuring Kacey Musgraves		"World on Fire"	Nate Smith	
February 24	"Texas Hold 'Em"	Beyoncé		"World on Fire"	Nate Smith	
March 2	"Texas Hold 'Em"	Beyoncé		"Pretty Little Poison"	Warren Zeiders	
March 9	"Texas Hold 'Em"	Beyoncé		"The Painter"	Cody Johnson	
March 16	"Texas Hold 'Em"	Beyoncé		"I Can Feel It"	Kane Brown	
March 23	"Texas Hold 'Em"	Beyoncé		"Mamaw's House"	Thomas Rhett featuring Morgan Wallen	
March 30	"Texas Hold 'Em"	Beyoncé		"Truck Bed"	Hardy	
April 6	"Texas Hold 'Em"	Beyoncé		"23"	Chayce Beckham	
April 13	"Texas Hold 'Em"	Beyoncé		"Burn It Down"	Parker McCollum	
April 20	"Texas Hold 'Em"	Beyoncé		"Man Made a Bar"	Morgan Wallen featuring Eric Church	
April 27	"Texas Hold 'Em"	Beyoncé		"Outskirts"	Sam Hunt	
May 4	"A Bar Song (Tipsy)"	Shaboozey		"Outskirts"	Sam Hunt	
May 11	"A Bar Song (Tipsy)"	Shaboozey		"Outskirts"	Sam Hunt	
May 18	"A Bar Song (Tipsy)"	Shaboozey		"Tucson Too Late"	Jordan Davis	
May 25	"I Had Some Help"	Post Malone featuring Morgan Wallen		"Back Then Right Now"	Tyler Hubbard	
June 1	"I Had Some Help"	Post Malone featuring Morgan Wallen		"Where It Ends"	Bailey Zimmerman	
June 8	"I Had Some Help"	Post Malone featuring Morgan Wallen		"Where It Ends"	Bailey Zimmerman	
June 15	"I Had Some Help"	Post Malone featuring Morgan Wallen		"Halfway to Hell"	Jelly Roll	
June 22	"I Had Some Help"	Post Malone featuring Morgan Wallen		"Take Her Home"	Kenny Chesney	
June 29	"I Had Some Help"	Post Malone featuring Morgan Wallen		"I Had Some Help"	Post Malone featuring Morgan Wallen	
July 6	"I Had Some Help"	Post Malone featuring Morgan Wallen		"I Had Some Help"	Post Malone featuring Morgan Wallen	
July 13	"A Bar Song (Tipsy)"	Shaboozey		"I Had Some Help"	Post Malone featuring Morgan Wallen	
July 20	"A Bar Song (Tipsy)"	Shaboozey		"I Had Some Help"	Post Malone featuring Morgan Wallen	
July 27	"A Bar Song (Tipsy)"	Shaboozey		"Cowgirls"	Morgan Wallen featuring Ernest	
August 3	"A Bar Song (Tipsy)"	Shaboozey		"A Bar Song (Tipsy)"	Shaboozey	
August 10	"A Bar Song (Tipsy)"	Shaboozey		"A Bar Song (Tipsy)"	Shaboozey	
August 17	"A Bar Song (Tipsy)"	Shaboozey		"A Bar Song (Tipsy)"	Shaboozey	
August 24	"A Bar Song (Tipsy)"	Shaboozey		"A Bar Song (Tipsy)"	Shaboozey	
August 31	"A Bar Song (Tipsy)"	Shaboozey		"A Bar Song (Tipsy)"	Shaboozey	
September 7	"A Bar Song (Tipsy)"	Shaboozey		"A Bar Song (Tipsy)"	Shaboozey	
September 14	"A Bar Song (Tipsy)"	Shaboozey		"A Bar Song (Tipsy)"	Shaboozey	
September 21	"A Bar Song (Tipsy)"	Shaboozey		"Chevrolet"	Dustin Lynch featuring Jelly Roll	
September 28	"A Bar Song (Tipsy)"	Shaboozey		"Ain't No Love in Oklahoma"	Luke Combs	
October 5	"A Bar Song (Tipsy)"	Shaboozey		"Ain't No Love in Oklahoma"	Luke Combs	
October 12	"A Bar Song (Tipsy)"	Shaboozey		"Pour Me a Drink"	Post Malone featuring Blake Shelton	
October 19	"A Bar Song (Tipsy)"	Shaboozey		"Pour Me a Drink"	Post Malone featuring Blake Shelton	
October 26	"A Bar Song (Tipsy)"	Shaboozey		"Pour Me a Drink"	Post Malone featuring Blake Shelton	
November 2	"Love Somebody"	Morgan Wallen		"Miles on It"	Marshmello and Kane Brown	
November 9	"A Bar Song (Tipsy)"	Shaboozey		"I Am Not Okay"	Jelly Roll	
November 16	"A Bar Song (Tipsy)"	Shaboozey		"I Am Not Okay"	Jelly Roll	
November 23	"A Bar Song (Tipsy)"	Shaboozey		"Lies Lies Lies"	Morgan Wallen	
November 30	"A Bar Song (Tipsy)"	Shaboozey		"I Am Not Okay"	Jelly Roll	
December 7	"A Bar Song (Tipsy)"	Shaboozey		"Gonna Love You"	Parmalee	
December 14	"A Bar Song (Tipsy)"	Shaboozey		"You Look Like You Love Me"	Ella Langley featuring Riley Green	
December 21	"A Bar Song (Tipsy)"	Shaboozey		"Cowboy Songs"	George Birge	
December 28	"A Bar Song (Tipsy)"	Shaboozey		"High Road"	Koe Wetzel and Jessie Murph	

== See also ==
- 2024 in country music
- List of artists who reached number one on the U.S. Hot Country chart
- List of number-one country singles of 2024 (Canada)
- List of Top Country Albums number ones of 2024
