= List of Billboard number-one country songs of 2025 =

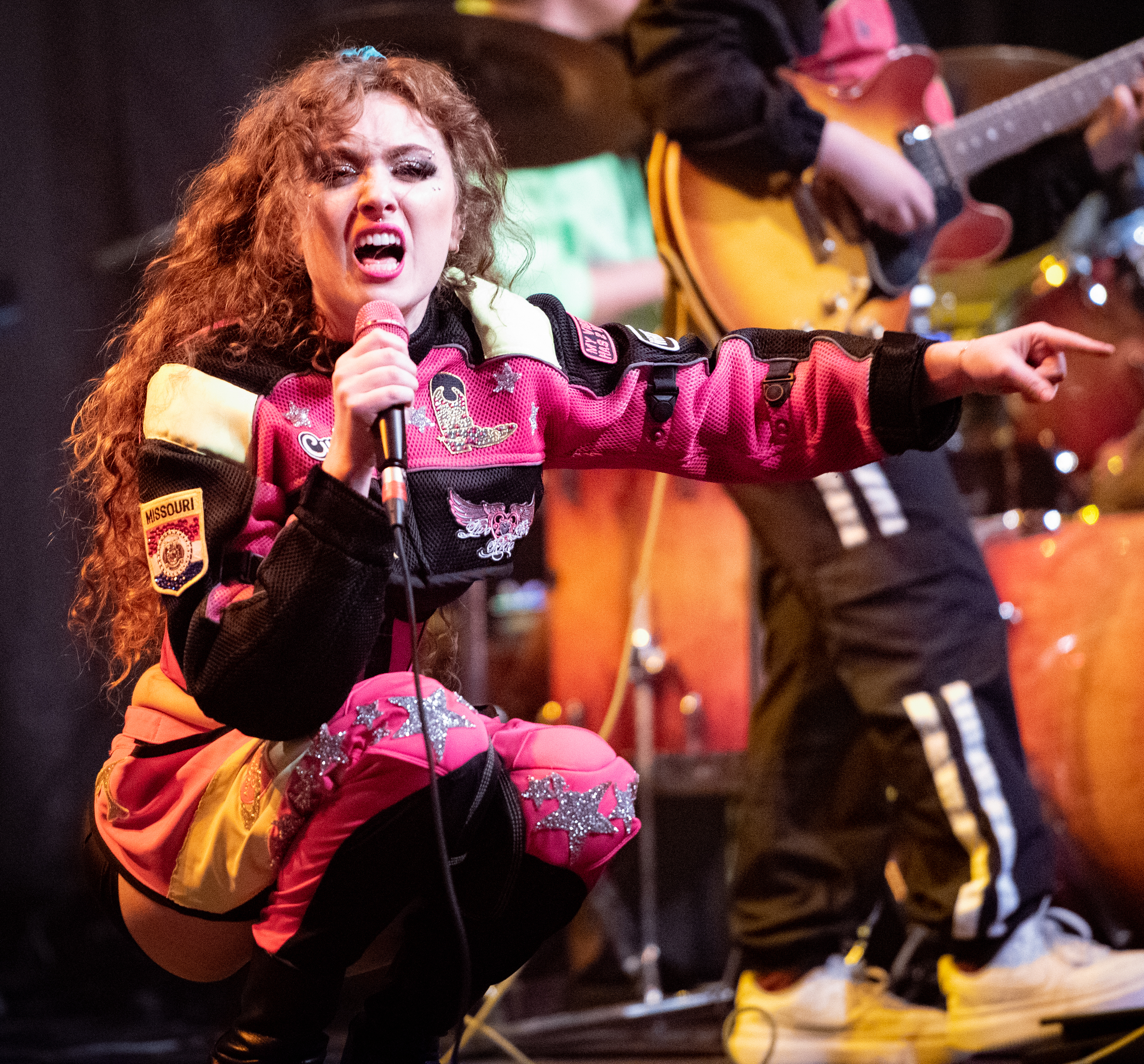
Chappell Roan topped the Hot Country Songs chart in March with "The Giver", her first release in the genre.

Hot Country Songs and Country Airplay are charts that rank the top-performing country songs in the United States, published by Billboard magazine. Hot Country Songs ranks songs based on digital downloads, streaming, and airplay from radio stations of all formats, a methodology introduced in 2012. Country Airplay, which was first published in 2012, is based solely on country radio airplay, a methodology that had previously been used from 1990 to 2012 for Hot Country Songs. In 2025, 7 different songs topped the Hot Country Songs chart and 21 different songs topped Country Airplay in 52 issues of the magazine.

In the issue of Billboard dated January 4, Shaboozey was at number one on Hot Country Songs with "A Bar Song (Tipsy)", the song's 28th week in the top spot, and "High Road" by Koe Wetzel and Jessie Murph spent its second week atop Country Airplay, both songs retaining that position from the final issue of 2024. Shaboozey's song held the top spot for the first 6 weeks of the year, taking its total run at number one to 33 weeks, before it was displaced by "I'm the Problem" by Morgan Wallen, who in the same week topped the Country Airplay listing with "Love Somebody". "A Bar Song (Tipsy)" returned to number one in the issue dated February 22, and a week later became the second-longest running Hot Country Songs number one of all time and the longest-running by a single artist.

Several artists not traditionally associated with country music gained their first chart-toppers in the genre during 2025. In the issue dated March 29, Chappell Roan, a singer primarily associated with pop music, achieved her first country number one when "The Giver", her first release in the genre, entered the Hot Country Songs chart at number one. Three weeks later, the rapper BigXthaPlug achieved the same feat when "All the Way", a collaboration with the country singer Bailey Zimmerman, debuted atop the listing. In the issue dated May 31, the pop singer Tate McRae gained her first country number one when she collaborated with Wallen on the track "What I Want". In the issue dated October 4, the rock band Hootie & the Blowfish gained their first country number one as a featured act on Scotty McCreery's "Bottle Rockets". The group's lead vocalist, Darius Rucker, who had achieved nine number-one singles as a solo artist up to this point, became the second artist to top the chart as both a solo artist and as a member of a duo or group. (Note: The first to achieve this feat was Tyler Hubbard in 2022, when he gained his first solo number one following 16 chart-toppers as a member of Florida Georgia Line.) "What I Want" was the year's longest-running number one on either chart with 20 weeks atop the Hot Country Songs listing. Wallen also had the longest-running Country Airplay chart-topper, having spent eight weeks in the peak position with "I'm the Problem", as well as the most number-one country songs, with five. Jelly Roll, Riley Green, and Ella Langley were the only other acts to achieve more than one country chart-topper during 2025, with two each.

== Chart history ==
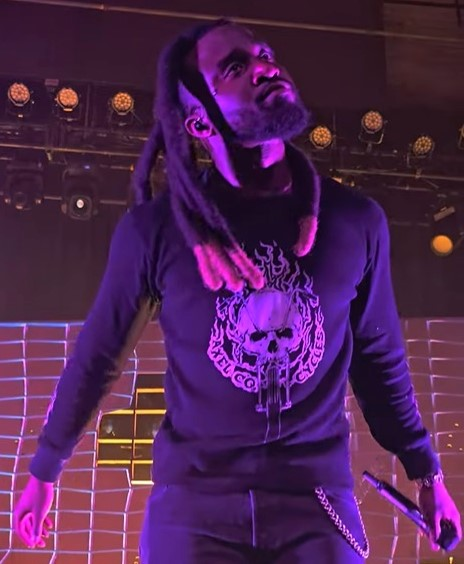
"A Bar Song (Tipsy)" by Shaboozey became the second-longest running Hot Country Songs number one of all time.

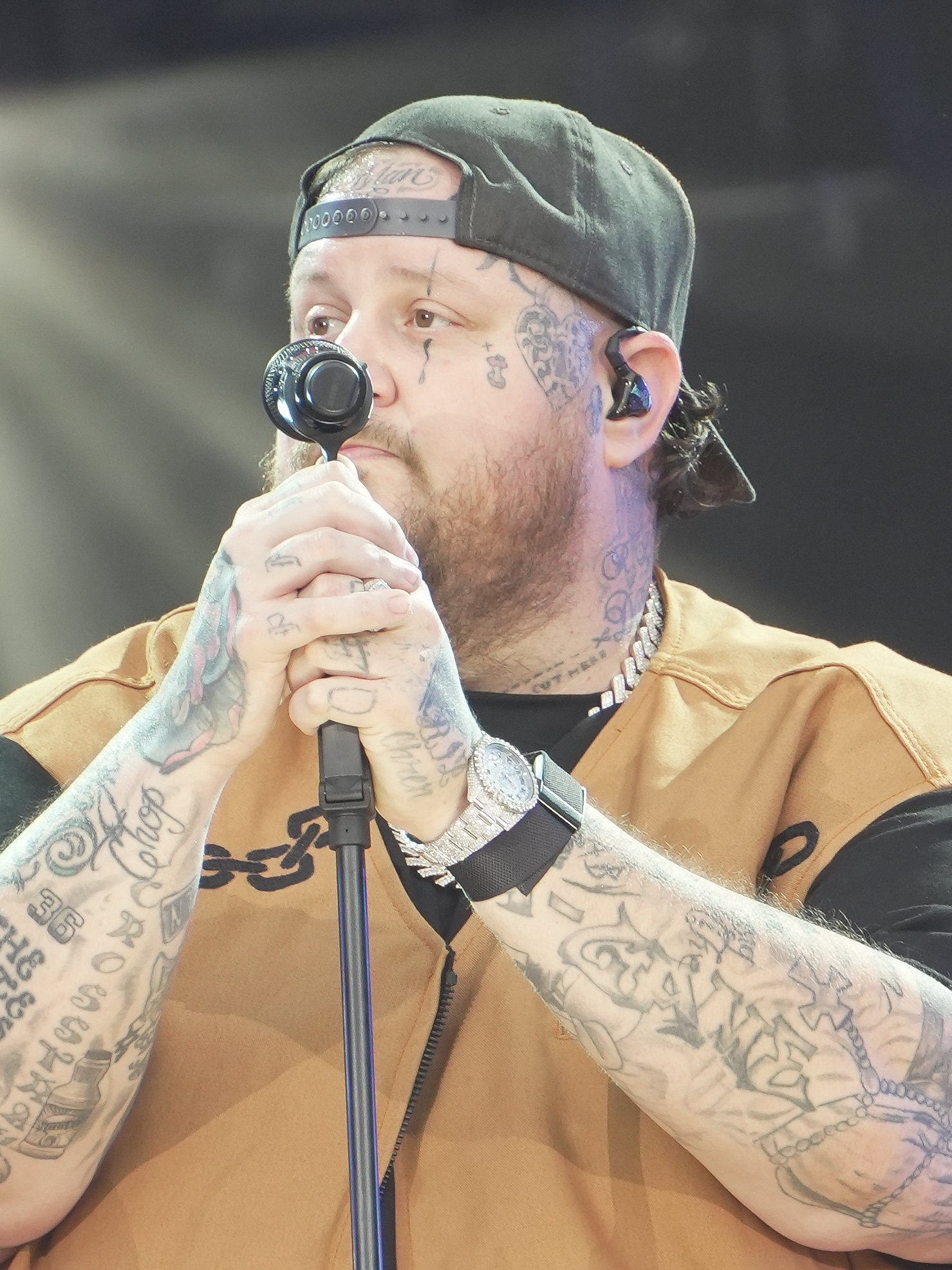
Jelly Roll topped the airplay chart for six consecutive weeks with "Liar" and returned to the top spot later in the year with "Heart of Stone".

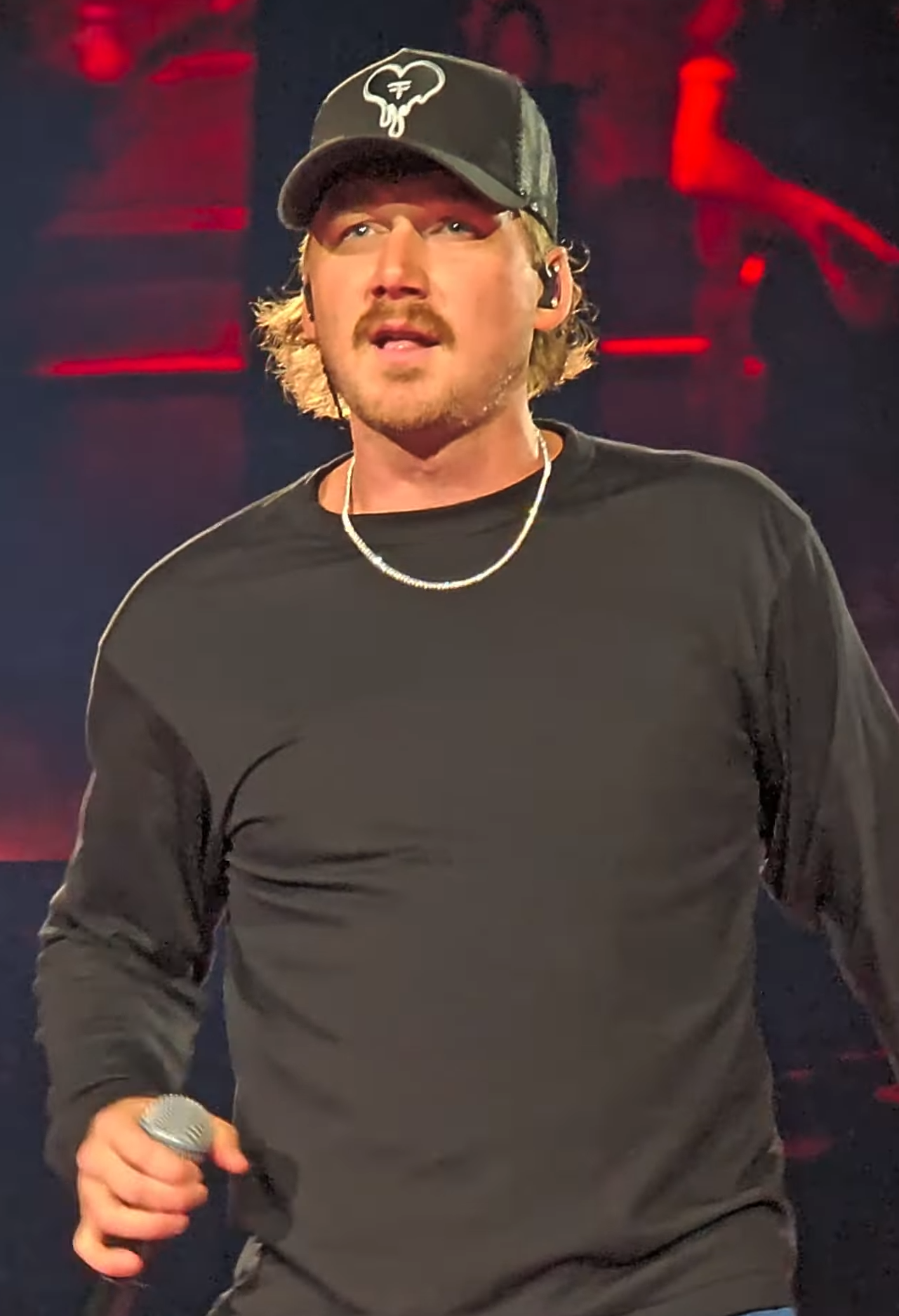
Five songs by Morgan Wallen have reached number one on one or both of the charts.

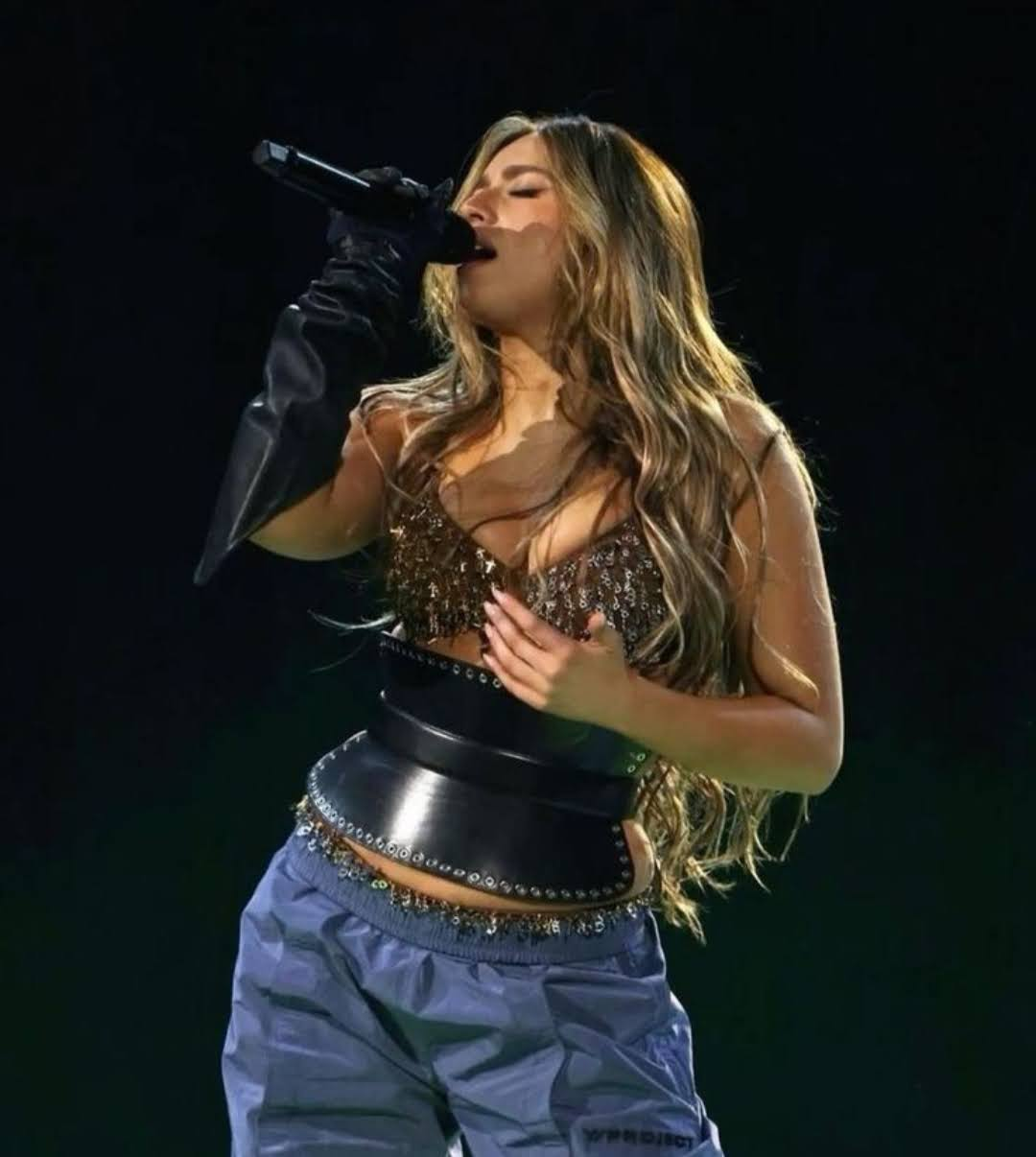
Tate McRae gained her first country number one in 2025.

Chart histories
Issue date	Hot Country Songs			Country Airplay		
Issue date	Title	Artist(s)	Ref.	Title	Artist(s)	Ref.
January 4	"A Bar Song (Tipsy)"	Shaboozey		"High Road"	Koe Wetzel and Jessie Murph	
January 11	"A Bar Song (Tipsy)"	Shaboozey		"High Road"	Koe Wetzel and Jessie Murph	
January 18	"A Bar Song (Tipsy)"	Shaboozey		"High Road"	Koe Wetzel and Jessie Murph	
January 25	"A Bar Song (Tipsy)"	Shaboozey		"High Road"	Koe Wetzel and Jessie Murph	
February 1	"A Bar Song (Tipsy)"	Shaboozey		"Love Somebody"	Morgan Wallen	
February 8	"A Bar Song (Tipsy)"	Shaboozey		"Love Somebody"	Morgan Wallen	
February 15	"I'm the Problem"	Morgan Wallen		"Love Somebody"	Morgan Wallen	
February 22	"A Bar Song (Tipsy)"	Shaboozey		"Liar"	Jelly Roll	
March 1	"A Bar Song (Tipsy)"	Shaboozey		"Liar"	Jelly Roll	
March 8	"A Bar Song (Tipsy)"	Shaboozey		"Liar"	Jelly Roll	
March 15	"A Bar Song (Tipsy)"	Shaboozey		"Liar"	Jelly Roll	
March 22	"A Bar Song (Tipsy)"	Shaboozey		"Liar"	Jelly Roll	
March 29	"The Giver"	Chappell Roan		"Liar"	Jelly Roll	
April 5	"A Bar Song (Tipsy)"	Shaboozey		"This Town's Been Too Good to Us"	Dylan Scott	
April 12	"A Bar Song (Tipsy)"	Shaboozey		"Hometown Home"	LoCash	
April 19	"All the Way"	BigXthaPlug featuring Bailey Zimmerman		"Hometown Home"	LoCash	
April 26	"A Bar Song (Tipsy)"	Shaboozey		"I'm the Problem"	Morgan Wallen	
May 3	"A Bar Song (Tipsy)"	Shaboozey		"I'm the Problem"	Morgan Wallen	
May 10	"A Bar Song (Tipsy)"	Shaboozey		"I'm the Problem"	Morgan Wallen	
May 17	"A Bar Song (Tipsy)"	Shaboozey		"I'm the Problem"	Morgan Wallen	
May 24	"A Bar Song (Tipsy)"	Shaboozey		"I'm the Problem"	Morgan Wallen	
May 31	"What I Want"	Morgan Wallen featuring Tate McRae		"I'm the Problem"	Morgan Wallen	
June 7	"What I Want"	Morgan Wallen featuring Tate McRae		"I'm the Problem"	Morgan Wallen	
June 14	"What I Want"	Morgan Wallen featuring Tate McRae		"I'm the Problem"	Morgan Wallen	
June 21	"What I Want"	Morgan Wallen featuring Tate McRae		"Worst Way"	Riley Green	
June 28	"What I Want"	Morgan Wallen featuring Tate McRae		"Worst Way"	Riley Green	
July 5	"What I Want"	Morgan Wallen featuring Tate McRae		"This Heart"	Corey Kent	
July 12	"What I Want"	Morgan Wallen featuring Tate McRae		"Just in Case"	Morgan Wallen	
July 19	"What I Want"	Morgan Wallen featuring Tate McRae		"Just in Case"	Morgan Wallen	
July 26	"What I Want"	Morgan Wallen featuring Tate McRae		"Just in Case"	Morgan Wallen	
August 2	"What I Want"	Morgan Wallen featuring Tate McRae		"Just in Case"	Morgan Wallen	
August 9	"What I Want"	Morgan Wallen featuring Tate McRae		"Park"	Tyler Hubbard	
August 16	"What I Want"	Morgan Wallen featuring Tate McRae		"After All the Bars Are Closed"	Thomas Rhett	
August 23	"What I Want"	Morgan Wallen featuring Tate McRae		"After All the Bars Are Closed"	Thomas Rhett	
August 30	"What I Want"	Morgan Wallen featuring Tate McRae		"After All the Bars Are Closed"	Thomas Rhett	
September 6	"What I Want"	Morgan Wallen featuring Tate McRae		"Good News"	Shaboozey	
September 13	"What I Want"	Morgan Wallen featuring Tate McRae		"Good News"	Shaboozey	
September 20	"What I Want"	Morgan Wallen featuring Tate McRae		"Happen to Me"	Russell Dickerson	
September 27	"What I Want"	Morgan Wallen featuring Tate McRae		"Happen to Me"	Russell Dickerson	
October 4	"What I Want"	Morgan Wallen featuring Tate McRae		"Bottle Rockets"	Scotty McCreery featuring Hootie & the Blowfish	
October 11	"What I Want"	Morgan Wallen featuring Tate McRae		"Heart of Stone"	Jelly Roll	
October 18	"I Got Better"	Morgan Wallen		"Heart of Stone"	Jelly Roll	
October 25	"I Got Better"	Morgan Wallen		"I Got Better"	Morgan Wallen	
November 1	"I Got Better"	Morgan Wallen		"Back in the Saddle"	Luke Combs	
November 8	"I Got Better"	Morgan Wallen		"Back in the Saddle"	Luke Combs	
November 15	"I Got Better"	Morgan Wallen		"Darlin'"	Chase Matthew	
November 22	"I Got Better"	Morgan Wallen		"Darlin'"	Chase Matthew	
November 29	"I Got Better"	Morgan Wallen		"Darlin'"	Chase Matthew	
December 6	"Choosin' Texas"	Ella Langley		"Somewhere Over Laredo"	Lainey Wilson	
December 13	"Choosin' Texas"	Ella Langley		"Cowgirl"	Parmalee	
December 20	"Choosin' Texas"	Ella Langley		"Don't Mind If I Do"	Riley Green featuring Ella Langley	
December 27	"Choosin' Texas"	Ella Langley		"Cowgirl"	Parmalee	

== See also ==
- 2025 in country music
- List of Top Country Albums number ones of 2025
