= NASCAR 26 =

2026 racing video game

- Cover art featuring Kyle Larson
- Developer: iRacing Studios
- Publisher: iRacing Studios
- Engine: Unreal Engine 5
- Platforms: PlayStation 5; Xbox Series X/S; Windows
- Release: PS5, Xbox Series X/S, Windows; September 15, 2026 (Gold Edition); September 18, 2026 (Standard Edition)
- Genre: Sim racing
- Modes: Single-player, multiplayer

NASCAR 26 is a sim racing game published and developed by iRacing Studios that was released on September 15, 2026 (Gold Edition) and September 18, 2026 (Standard Edition) for PlayStation 5, Xbox Series X/S, and Windows.

== Background ==
On June 8, 2026, iRacing’s Kevin Bobbitt confirmed the game, as well as their upcoming IndyCar game, were "well into development" on iRacing's Downshift Podcast.

The title will be iRacing Studio's second release in the NASCAR franchise of video games.

On June 19th, 2026, IRacing Studios announced that reigning champion Kyle Larson would be on the cover.

== Development ==
iRacing would continue to use Unreal Engine 5 for the development of NASCAR 26.

The developers would continue releasing videos entitled Dev Diaries, showcasing aspects of the game as they developed it, as they did with NASCAR 25 starting in August 2024 and have done with iRacing since June 2015.

In August that year, they would once again hold a Q&A through NASCAR's official Discord server, where numerous changes were revealed; including advanced force feedback, cross platform multiplayer, among other improvements.

== Soundtrack ==
Curation of the soundtrack was once again overseen by NASCAR Hall of Fame inductee Dale Earnhardt Jr.

Song	Artist
"All the Same"	Sick Puppies
"Cars in the Desert"	Nathaniel Rateliff & the Night Sweats
"Dale Earnhardt"	The Hot Skillet Lickers
"Digital (Did You Tell)"	Stone Sour
"FADEOUT"	Kami Kehoe
"Fall In Fall Out"	Tigercub
"Let 'Em Know"	T.I.
"Mama Tried"	Tim Dugger
"Rabbit Hole (Cowards, Pt. 1)"	Chevelle
"Reasons"	Alien Ant Farm
"Road Runner"	Lainey Wilson
"Son's Gonna Rise"	Citizen Cope feat. Carlos Santana
"Super Bon Bon"	Soul Coughing
"Sweet Home Alabama"	Lynyrd Skynyrd
"Tunnels"	Angels & Airwaves
"Wake Up Calling"	Papa Roach
"What Is It to Burn"	Finch
"Where the Hood At [AXIOMATIC REMIX]"	DMX
"Year to Be Young 1994"	Stephen Wilson Jr.

== Reception ==
Reception

Aggregate scores
Aggregator	Score
Metacritic	(PS5) 76/100 (XSX) 75/100
OpenCritic	44% recommend (Note: Based on 25 reviews)

The PlayStation 5 and Xbox Series X versions of NASCAR 26 both received generally favorable reviews from critics, according to the review aggregation website Metacritic. Fellow review aggregator OpenCritic assessed that the game was recommended by 44% of critics.
