= List of Top Country Albums number ones of 2024 =

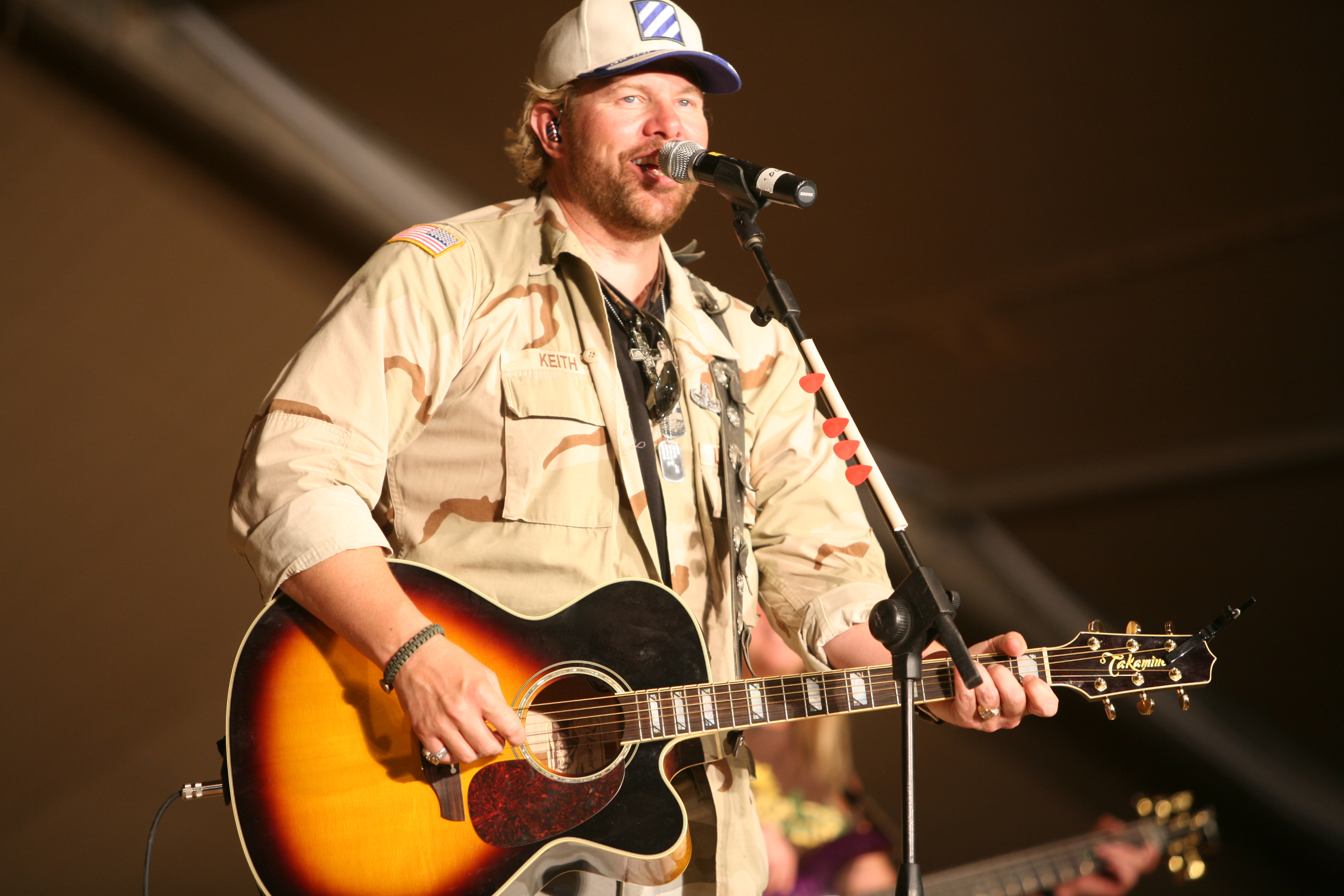
Toby Keith achieved a posthumous number one in February.

Top Country Albums is a chart that ranks the top-performing country music albums in the United States, published by Billboard. Chart positions are based on multi-metric consumption, blending traditional album sales, track equivalent albums, and streaming equivalent albums.

In the issue of Billboard dated January 6, Morgan Wallen's One Thing at a Time spent its 34th week at number one. It held the top spot for the first six weeks of the year before being displaced by Toby Keith's compilation album 35 Biggest Hits, which returned to number one nearly sixteen years after its release in the wake of the singer's death on February 5, 2024. Kacey Musgraves' album Deeper Well debuted at number one in the issue dated March 30, making her the first woman to top the chart during the year. Two weeks later, Cowboy Carter by Beyoncé entered the chart at number one, making the singer the first African American woman to achieve a number-one country album.

In the issue dated June 15, Wallen's album spent its 51st week in the top spot, setting a new mark for the second-longest run at number one on the chart, surpassed only by the same singer's previous release Dangerous: The Double Album.

== Chart history ==
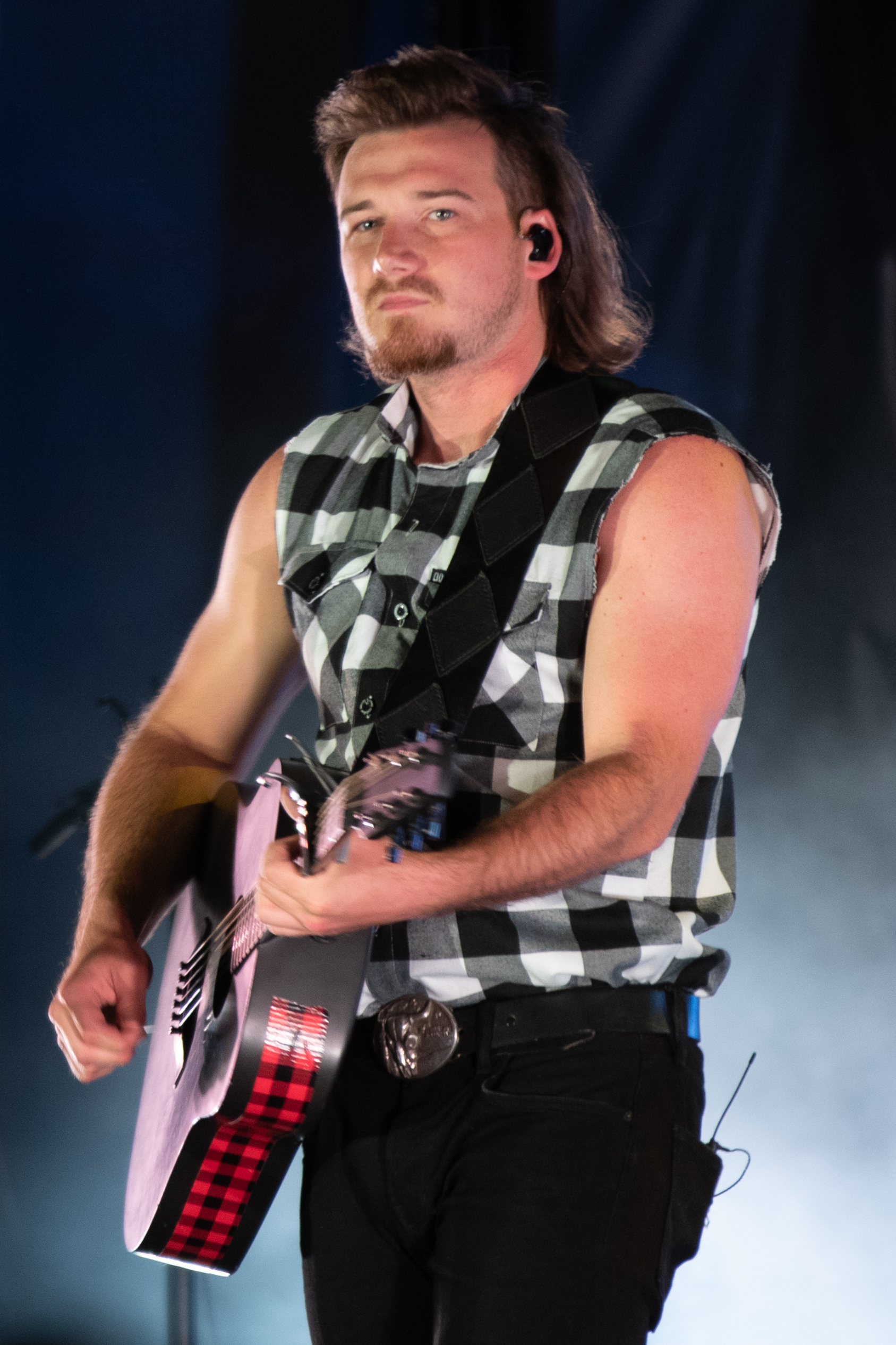
Morgan Wallen spent a total of 34 weeks at number one in 2024.

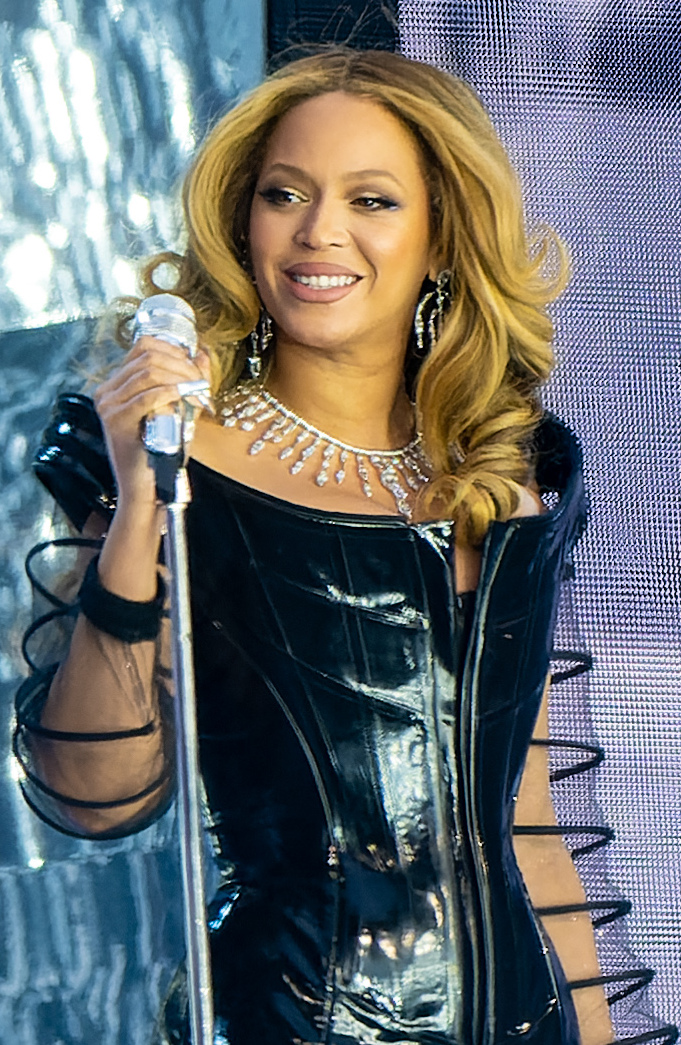
In April, Beyoncé became the first female African-American artist ever to achieve a number-one country album.

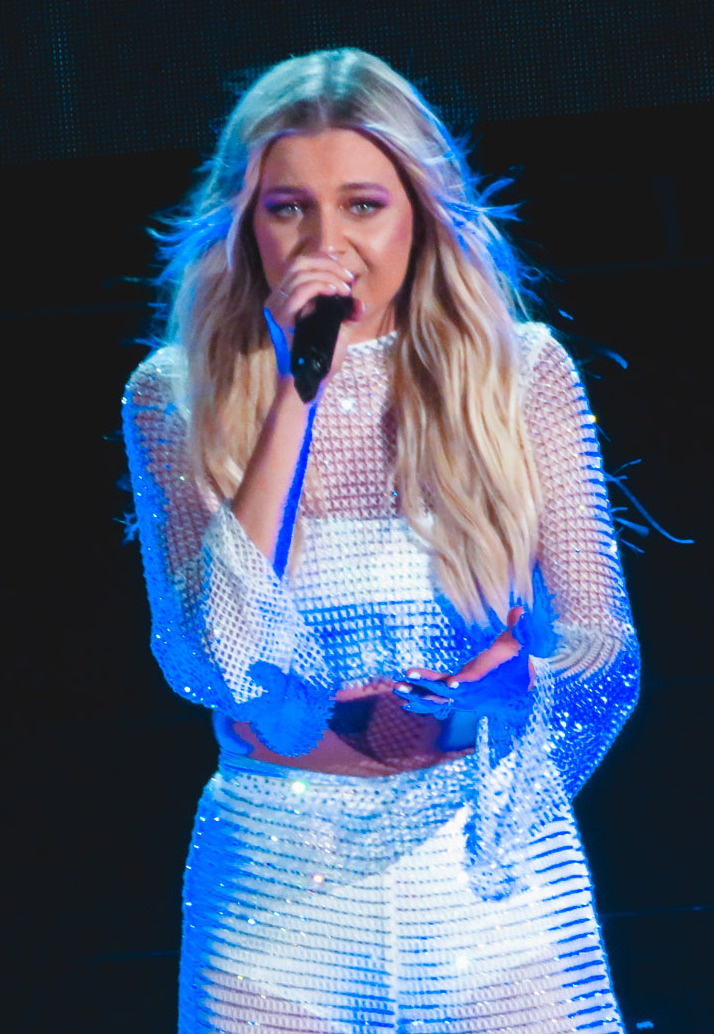
In November, Kelsea Ballerini achieved her first number-one album with Patterns.

Issue date	Title	Artist(s)	Ref.
January 6	One Thing at a Time	Morgan Wallen	
January 13	One Thing at a Time	Morgan Wallen	
January 20	One Thing at a Time	Morgan Wallen	
January 27	One Thing at a Time	Morgan Wallen	
February 3	One Thing at a Time	Morgan Wallen	
February 10	One Thing at a Time	Morgan Wallen	
February 17	35 Biggest Hits	Toby Keith	
February 24	One Thing at a Time	Morgan Wallen	
March 2	One Thing at a Time	Morgan Wallen	
March 9	One Thing at a Time	Morgan Wallen	
March 16	One Thing at a Time	Morgan Wallen	
March 23	One Thing at a Time	Morgan Wallen	
March 30	Deeper Well	Kacey Musgraves	
April 6	One Thing at a Time	Morgan Wallen	
April 13	Cowboy Carter	Beyoncé	
April 20	Cowboy Carter	Beyoncé	
April 27	Cowboy Carter	Beyoncé	
May 4	Cowboy Carter	Beyoncé	
May 11	One Thing at a Time	Morgan Wallen	
May 18	One Thing at a Time	Morgan Wallen	
May 25	One Thing at a Time	Morgan Wallen	
June 1	One Thing at a Time	Morgan Wallen	
June 8	One Thing at a Time	Morgan Wallen	
June 15	One Thing at a Time	Morgan Wallen	
June 22	One Thing at a Time	Morgan Wallen	
June 29	One Thing at a Time	Morgan Wallen	
July 6	One Thing at a Time	Morgan Wallen	
July 13	One Thing at a Time	Morgan Wallen	
July 20	The Great American Bar Scene	Zach Bryan	
July 27	The Great American Bar Scene	Zach Bryan	
August 3	The Great American Bar Scene	Zach Bryan	
August 10	One Thing at a Time	Morgan Wallen	
August 17	One Thing at a Time	Morgan Wallen	
August 24	One Thing at a Time	Morgan Wallen	
August 31	F-1 Trillion	Post Malone	
September 7	F-1 Trillion	Post Malone	
September 14	F-1 Trillion	Post Malone	
September 21	F-1 Trillion	Post Malone	
September 28	F-1 Trillion	Post Malone	
October 5	F-1 Trillion	Post Malone	
October 12	One Thing at a Time	Morgan Wallen	
October 19	One Thing at a Time	Morgan Wallen	
October 26	Beautifully Broken	Jelly Roll	
November 2	Beautifully Broken	Jelly Roll	
November 9	Patterns	Kelsea Ballerini	
November 16	One Thing at a Time	Morgan Wallen	
November 23	One Thing at a Time	Morgan Wallen	
November 30	One Thing at a Time	Morgan Wallen	
December 7	One Thing at a Time	Morgan Wallen	
December 14	One Thing at a Time	Morgan Wallen	
December 21	One Thing at a Time	Morgan Wallen	
December 28	One Thing at a Time	Morgan Wallen	

== See also ==
- 2024 in country music
- List of Billboard number-one country songs of 2024
