= Erynn Chambers =

American social media influencer (born 1992)

- Born: Erynn Malessia Chambers; 1992
- Occupations: Activist; teacher

TikTok information
- Page: Rynn
- Followers: 1.2 million
- Last updated: January 6, 2025

Erynn Chambers, better known under her TikTok username rynnstar (born 1992), is an American social media content creator, activist, and teacher. She is best known for her work on TikTok. She is also credited as a co-author on the country song "Beer Beer, Truck Truck", as a result of a viral video she made satirizing country music.

== Career ==
Chambers taught music at an elementary school in Charlotte, North Carolina. She is the creator of the popular account @Rynnstar on TikTok, which she started during the COVID-19 pandemic and before the 2020 surge in Black Lives Matter protests. On TikTok, she posts about a variety of topics, including linguistics, history, musical theater, and activism. The murder of George Floyd shifted her research towards a greater focus on racial equity. According to People, "What makes Chambers' content so special is that it meets her followers where they are without coddling them." In 2021, USA Today described her as "one of the most important creators raising awareness of the Black experience and racism on TikTok".

=== Podcasts ===
Chambers has three podcasts: Hot Tea Hot Takes, Close Encounters of the Blerd Kind, and The Wordy & Nerdy Show.

=== TikTok ===
==== Activism ====
Erynn Chambers on TikTok
- About y'alls favorite "statistics"
- "Beer Beer, Truck Truck"

Chambers' TikTok includes advocacy and information about racial equality, including a video she posted in July 2020 in which she used TikTok's "duet" function to add commentary to another user's video. She was inspired to create her video after watching a TikTok about how statistics are manipulated to create the false impression of greater violence perpetrated by Black Americans.

In her video, titled "About y'alls favorite 'statistics'", she criticized the argument that Black people are responsible for more violent crime in the form of a jingle, singing "Black neighborhoods are overpoliced, so of course they have higher rates of crime. And white perpetrators are undercharged, so of course they have lower rates of crime. And all those stupid stats that you keep using are operating off a small sample size. So shut up, shut up, shut up, shut up, shut up, shut up, shut up."

The video garnered over two million views. Wired magazine named it one of the best TikTok videos of 2020, with Emma Grey Ellis writing, "TikTokkers duetted it, made horn remixes of it, pole danced to it. It's TikTok at its best and most dystopian at the same time, and it lives in my head rent-free."

In a video titled "Why is Rosa Parks the only black activist we learn about?", she discussed the Montgomery bus boycott. In 2020, Chambers discussed her practice of body neutrality on TikTok, and she has been part of the body neutrality movement for years.

==== Beer Beer, Truck Truck ====
In 2020, Chambers made a video satirizing country music, summarizing the style of country music produced by men as "Beer, beer, truck, truck, girls in tight jeans, beer, truck, beer, truck, America, America". She contrasted this with her view of the style of country music produced by women, summarized as, "He cheated on me, so I burned down his house and destroyed everything he loved—and then I killed him". The video currently has over 1.8 million likes. George Birge, a country musician who was considering ending his singing career at the time, then made a legitimate song out of the chorus entitled "Beer Beer, Truck Truck", which he posted to TikTok and subsequently released in 2021. As a result of the song, George Birge was signed to a recording contract in Nashville. The song was released June 18, 2021 as his first single. Chambers was listed as a co-author of the credits of the song, causing her to be inducted into the American Society of Composers, Authors and Publishers.
