= Ride, Ride, Ride (George Birge and Luke Bryan song) =

2026 song by George Birge featuring Luke Bryan

Single by George Birge featuring Luke Bryan
- Written: 2024–September 4, 2024
- Released: February 5, 2026
- Recorded: 2025
- Genre: Country
- Length: 3:20
- Label: Records Nashville
- Songwriters: George Birge; Casey Brown; Tyler Hubbard; Parker Welling
- Producer: Casey Brown

George Birge singles chronology
"It Won't Be Long" (2025)	"Ride, Ride, Ride" (2026)

Luke Bryan singles chronology
"Winter Wonderland" (2025)	"Ride, Ride, Ride" (2026)	"Country and She Knows It" (2026)

Music video
- "Ride, Ride, Ride" on YouTube

"Ride, Ride, Ride" is a song by American country music singers George Birge and Luke Bryan. It was released on February 5, 2026, as the second single from Birge's upcoming second studio album, via Records Nashville. Birge co-wrote the song with Casey Brown, Tyler Hubbard, and Parker Welling. Brown produced the song.

== Background ==
"Ride, Ride, Ride"'s cowboy theme is directly inspired by Birge's father, who immigrated to the United States from Brazil, and learned English by watching John Wayne movies. The song originally was titled "Saddle Up Anyway" before a writing session on September 4, 2024, with co-writers Casey Brown, Tyler Hubbard, and Parker Welling led to the final song being named "Ride, Ride, Ride".

The song was initially intended to be a duet with Birge and Hubbard, but Hubbard's release of a duet with Nate Smith, "After Midnight", caused timing conflicts. Instead, Bryan joined the song as a feature after Birge played it for him on Bryan's tour bus, with Bryan stating, "When you hear me and George on that thing together...it just sounds like something totally meant to be", with him requesting Birge be the primary artist and singing the first verse.

"Ride, Ride, Ride" was released digitally on January 28, 2026, before impacting country radio on February 5, 2026, via Play MPE.

The song's music video was released on March 4, 2026, and was directed by Midtown Motion.

== Commercial performance ==
Following the commercial success of Birge's two previous singles, "Cowboy Songs" and "It Won't Be Long", "Ride, Ride, Ride" debuted as the most-added song of its debut week, dated February 9, 2026, with 96 total adds.

== Personnel ==
Credits adapted from Tidal and Billboard.

- Luke Bryan – vocals
- George Birge – vocals
- Sol Philcox-Littlefield – electric guitar, bass
- Dave Cohen – keyboards
- Evan Hutchings – drums
- Chris Small – background vocals
- Anthony Olympia – acoustic instruments
- Casey Brown – production, recording
- Mike Cervantes – mastering
- Jim Cooley – mixing

== Charts ==
Weekly chart performance for "Ride, Ride, Ride"
Chart (2026)	Peak position
Canada Country (Billboard)	10
New Zealand Hot Singles (RMNZ)	38
US Bubbling Under Hot 100 (Billboard)	15
US Country Airplay (Billboard)	12
US Hot Country Songs (Billboard)	39
