= It Won't Be Long (disambiguation) =

"It Won't Be Long" is a 1963 song by The Beatles.

It Won't Be Long may also refer to:

- "It Won't Be Long" (Alison Moyet song), 1991
- "It Won't Be Long" (George Birge song), 2025
- "It Won't Be Long," a song by Elvis Presley from the soundtrack album Double Trouble.

== See also ==
- "Won't Be Long", a 2007 song by the Hives from The Black and White Album
