= Mind on You (George Birge song) =

Single by George Birge

from the album George Birge: Mind on You
- Released: October 17, 2022
- Genre: Country
- Length: 2:59
- Label: Records Nashville
- Songwriters: George Birge; Colt Ford; Jaron Boyer; Michael Tyler
- Producer: Ash Bowers

George Birge singles chronology
"Beer Beer, Truck Truck" (2021)	"Mind on You" (2022)	"Amy's Back in Austin" (2023)

"Mind on You" is a song by American country music singer George Birge. It appears on his 2022 debut EP George Birge and is the first single from his 2023 debut album George Birge: Mind on You. The song reached number 2 on the Country Airplay chart for one week in early January 2024, behind "World on Fire" by Nate Smith.

== History ==
George Birge wrote "Mind on You" with Jaron Boyer, Michael Tyler, and country rap artist Colt Ford. Ash Bowers produced the track, which was released through Bowers's Records Nashville label. The song appears on Birge's self-titled debut album, released on May 12, 2023.

Prior to the song's release, Birge was a member of the duo Waterloo Revival. He had his first solo release in late 2020-early 2021 with the viral release "Beer Beer, Truck Truck".

Birge describes "Mind on You" as a "pretty romantic song". Taste of Country's Billy Dukes said that the song "finds him obsessing over a new lover" and described it as "a modern pop-country beat with R&B influences."

A remix of the song with Kidd G and Charlieonnafriday was released on December 15, 2023.

== Charts ==
=== Weekly charts ===
Weekly chart performance
Chart (2022–2026)	Peak position
Canada Country (Billboard)	46
US Billboard Hot 100	62
US Country Airplay (Billboard)	2
US Hot Country Songs (Billboard)	16

=== Year-end charts ===
Annual chart rankings
Chart (2024)	Position
US Country Airplay (Billboard)	41
US Hot Country Songs (Billboard)	73
US Radio Songs (Billboard)	60
