= IRacing Arcade =

2026 arcade racing video game

iRacing Arcade
- Cover art for iRacing Arcade.
- Developer: Original Fire Games
- Publisher: iRacing Studios
- Platforms: PlayStation 5; Xbox Series X/S; Windows
- Release: Windows; March 3, 2026; PS5, Xbox Series X/S; August 21, 2026
- Genres: Racing, Simcade
- Mode: Single-player

iRacing Arcade is a racing simcade video game developed by Original Fire Games and published by iRacing Studios that was released on March 3, 2026, for Windows and for PlayStation 5 and Xbox Series X/S on August 21, 2026.

== Background ==
On March 3, 2026 iRacing Studios alongside developer Original Fire Games officially released iRacing Arcade on PC via Steam.

On August 21, 2026 the console ports for both the PlayStation 5 and Xbox Series X/S were released.

== Development ==
iRacing first confirmed the game was in development in June 2024. The title was officially announced in July 2025, coinciding with the formation of iRacing Studios.

Ahead of its March 2026 launch, iRacing Studios released a public demo of the game for iRacing users to play. The demo quickly surpassed 100,000 downloads.

== Reception ==
Reception

Aggregate scores
Aggregator	Score
Metacritic	72/100
OpenCritic	41% recommend

Review scores
Publication	Score
Eurogamer	3/5
Hardcore Gamer	7/10
Checkpoint Gaming	8/10
Multiplayer.it	7/10

iRacing Arcade received "mixed or average" reviews according to review aggregator Metacritic. Fellow review aggregator OpenCritic assessed that the game received strong approval, being recommended by 41% of critics.
