= IndyCar Racing The Game =

- Developer: iRacing Studios
- Publisher: iRacing Studios
- Engine: Orontes Engine
- Platforms: PlayStation 5; Xbox Series X/S; Windows
- Release: PS5, Xbox Series X/S. Windows; 2027
- Genre: Sim racing
- Modes: Single-player, multiplayer

IndyCar Racing The Game is an upcoming sim racing game published and developed by iRacing Studios that is set to be released in early 2027, for PlayStation 5, Xbox Series X/S, and Windows.

== Development ==
Talk of the game initially began in July 2021 when Motorsport Games had bought the licensing rights to develop the game, with a release date slated for 2023. In April 2023 the publisher announced the game would be delayed and finally in August of that year, Motorsport Games would suspend all operations on the project.

iRacing Studios had the option to work with the assets from the previously cancelled Motorsport Games IndyCar game, but elected not to. The title instead will continue to use Unreal Engine 5 as its physics engine just like with other titles in their catalogue such as NASCAR 26. However, the game will switch to their proprietary Orontes Engine for their graphics engine starting with this title.

In July 2026 the studio revealed that the game would be pushed back to an early 2027 release window.
