= Beer Beer, Truck Truck =

Single by George Birge

from the album George Birge: Mind on You
- Released: June 18, 2021
- Recorded: January–February 2021
- Genre: Country
- Length: 2:26
- Label: Records Nashville
- Songwriters: George Birge; Erynn Chambers
- Producer: Ash Bowers

George Birge singles chronology
"Beer Beer, Truck Truck" (2021)	"Mind on You" (2022)

"Beer Beer, Truck Truck" is a 2021 song by American country music singer George Birge. The chorus of the song is a based on a viral video on TikTok made by Erynn Chambers, intended to satirize country music. The song in turn defends the genre, and lists Chambers as a co-author. Chambers has been encouraging of the song, calling it an "honor and a privilege".

== Background ==
External videos
- Erynn Chambers' video on TikTok
- George Birge's initial response

On October 17, 2020, Erynn Chambers, a TikTok personality known primarily for social justice advocacy, posted a video intended as a joke on TikTok. In the video, Chambers satirizes country music made by men by singing "Beer, beer, truck, truck, girls in tight jeans, beer, truck, beer, truck, America, America". The video went viral on TikTok, garnering 5.6 million views, 1.8 million likes, and 67,000 shares.

George Birge, then a member of a country duo named Waterloo Revival, was reconsidering his singing career due to a lack of success in the field compared to his relative success writing for other artists. When he spoke to Clay Walker about his concerns, Walker advised him to start posting his singing content to TikTok. Birge later told NPR that "if you do something that catches fire on TikTok, you can get in front of a million people instantly, and so that kind of piqued my interest." Birge came across Chamber's video, and finding the "Beer beer, truck truck, girls in tight jeans" line interesting, wrote a melody and chorus based on the hook. Birge posted a video of him playing the chorus to TikTok, where it also went viral, increasing his follower count from 10 before he posted his video to 30,000 the next morning. Birge never intended to write a full song with the chorus, but he decided to do so after being inundated with requests from viewers.

== Lyrics ==
Birge's song acts as a counterpoint to Chambers' video, which parodies country music by singing "beer beer, truck truck, girls in tight jeans". The song narrates a man trying to convince his love, who moved to the city, that life in the American countryside "ain't all beer, beer, truck, truck, girls in them tight jeans".

== Production and release ==
In January 2021, Birge recorded a demo with producer Ash Bowers, and posted another video on TikTok of the demo playing out of his car speakers. The video gained traction, and Birge starting receiving calls from record labels, eventually signing with Records Nashville. By February 2021, a full studio version had been recorded. When the song was released, Chambers was credited as a co-author of the song, with Birge explaining that "even though she was poking fun at country music, the foundation of the chorus is straight from her mouth. And I felt like she deserves some songwriting credit for that."

== Reaction and impact ==
Reception for the creation of the song, and the song itself, was generally positive. Taste Of Country praised Birge as "the kind of guy capable of softly defending his chosen music and profession" through his initial response to Chambers' video. NPR complimented Birge's ability to turn Chambers' joke into a "genuinely sweet ballad".

As a result of the song's release with Chambers as a co-author, Chambers was inducted into the American Society of Composers, Authors and Publishers. Chambers has been encouraging of Birge's parody, telling NPR that "I mean, it's really an honor and a privilege and a shock to see something that I came up with on the fly, like, really connect with people and really, really go out there like that." Birge commented that "She [Chambers] was doing it light-hearted, and she's actually been a great sport about it and a real supporter of the song".
