= List of Top Country Albums number ones of 2025 =

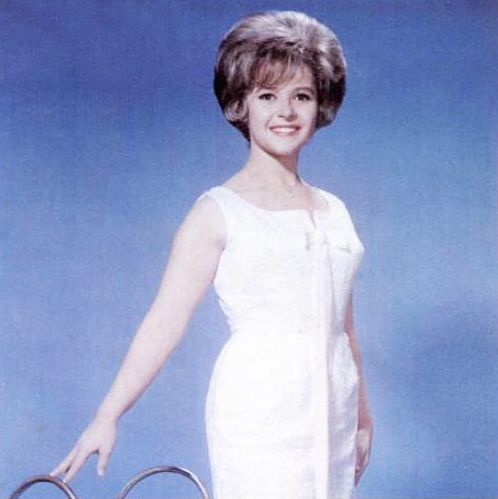
Brenda Lee (pictured in 1965) spent the first week of the year at number one with an album of vintage Christmas recordings.

Top Country Albums is a chart that ranks the top-performing country music albums in the United States, published by Billboard. Chart positions are based on multi-metric consumption, blending traditional album sales, track equivalent albums, and streaming equivalent albums.

In the issue of Billboard dated January 4, Brenda Lee was at number one with Rockin' Around The Christmas Tree: The Decca Christmas Recordings, an album originally released in 1964. The following week, Morgan Wallen's album One Thing at a Time returned to number one and held the top spot through the issue dated May 24, an unbroken run of 20 weeks atop the chart. In the issue dated March 1, the album spent its 75th cumulative week at number one; it was Wallen's 174th week atop the chart in total, breaking the all-time record held by Garth Brooks. In the issue dated May 31, One Thing at a Time was displaced by Wallen's subsequent album I'm the Problem, continuing the singer's uninterrupted run at number one. As of the end of the year, Wallen had held the top spot for 51 consecutive weeks.

== Chart history ==
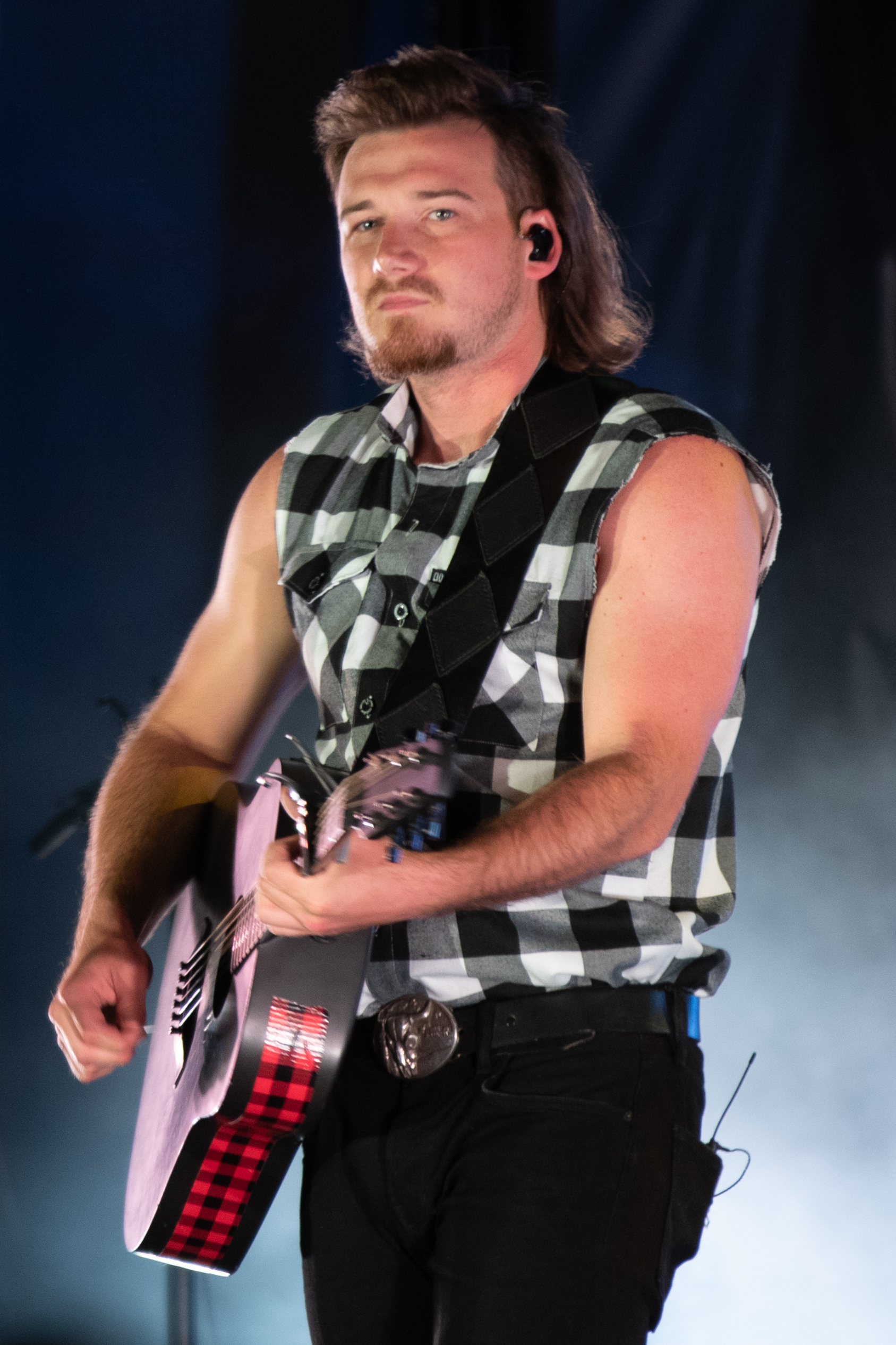
Morgan Wallen held the top spot without interruption from the chart dated January 11 until the end of the year.

Issue date	Title	Artist(s)	Ref.
January 4	Rockin' Around The Christmas Tree: The Decca Christmas Recordings	Brenda Lee	
January 11	One Thing at a Time	Morgan Wallen	
January 18	One Thing at a Time	Morgan Wallen	
January 25	One Thing at a Time	Morgan Wallen	
February 1	One Thing at a Time	Morgan Wallen	
February 8	One Thing at a Time	Morgan Wallen	
February 15	One Thing at a Time	Morgan Wallen	
February 22	One Thing at a Time	Morgan Wallen	
March 1	One Thing at a Time	Morgan Wallen	
March 8	One Thing at a Time	Morgan Wallen	
March 15	One Thing at a Time	Morgan Wallen	
March 22	One Thing at a Time	Morgan Wallen	
March 29	One Thing at a Time	Morgan Wallen	
April 5	One Thing at a Time	Morgan Wallen	
April 12	One Thing at a Time	Morgan Wallen	
April 19	One Thing at a Time	Morgan Wallen	
April 26	One Thing at a Time	Morgan Wallen	
May 3	One Thing at a Time	Morgan Wallen	
May 10	One Thing at a Time	Morgan Wallen	
May 17	One Thing at a Time	Morgan Wallen	
May 24	One Thing at a Time	Morgan Wallen	
May 31	I'm the Problem	Morgan Wallen	
June 7	I'm the Problem	Morgan Wallen	
June 14	I'm the Problem	Morgan Wallen	
June 21	I'm the Problem	Morgan Wallen	
June 28	I'm the Problem	Morgan Wallen	
July 5	I'm the Problem	Morgan Wallen	
July 12	I'm the Problem	Morgan Wallen	
July 19	I'm the Problem	Morgan Wallen	
July 26	I'm the Problem	Morgan Wallen	
August 2	I'm the Problem	Morgan Wallen	
August 9	I'm the Problem	Morgan Wallen	
August 16	I'm the Problem	Morgan Wallen	
August 23	I'm the Problem	Morgan Wallen	
August 30	I'm the Problem	Morgan Wallen	
September 6	I'm the Problem	Morgan Wallen	
September 13	I'm the Problem	Morgan Wallen	
September 20	I'm the Problem	Morgan Wallen	
September 27	I'm the Problem	Morgan Wallen	
October 4	I'm the Problem	Morgan Wallen	
October 11	I'm the Problem	Morgan Wallen	
October 18	I'm the Problem	Morgan Wallen	
October 25	I'm the Problem	Morgan Wallen	
November 1	I'm the Problem	Morgan Wallen	
November 8	I'm the Problem	Morgan Wallen	
November 15	I'm the Problem	Morgan Wallen	
November 22	I'm the Problem	Morgan Wallen	
November 29	I'm the Problem	Morgan Wallen	
December 6	I'm the Problem	Morgan Wallen	
December 13	I'm the Problem	Morgan Wallen	
December 20	I'm the Problem	Morgan Wallen	
December 27	I'm the Problem	Morgan Wallen	

== See also ==
- 2025 in country music
- List of Billboard number-one country songs of 2025
