= Lonely Road (Machine Gun Kelly and Jelly Roll song) =

2024 single by Machine Gun Kelly and Jelly Roll

Single by Machine Gun Kelly and Jelly Roll
- Released: July 26, 2024
- Length: 3:09
- Label: EST 19XX; Interscope
- Songwriters: Colson Baker; Jason DeFord; Travis Barker; John Denver; Bill Danoff; Mary Danoff; Taffy Danoff; Steve Basil; Brandon Allen; Nick Long
- Producers: Barker; Charlie Handsome; BazeXX; SlimXX

Machine Gun Kelly singles chronology
"El Pistolero" (2024)	"Lonely Road" (2024)	"Your Name Forever" (2025)

Jelly Roll singles chronology
"Somebody Save Me" (2024)	"Lonely Road" (2024)	"Liar" (2024)

Music video
- "Lonely Road" on YouTube

"Lonely Road" is a song by American musicians Machine Gun Kelly and Jelly Roll, released on July 26, 2024. Produced by Travis Barker, Charlie Handsome, BazeXX and SlimXX, it notably interpolates "Take Me Home, Country Roads" by John Denver. It is included on the "Pickin' Up the Pieces" deluxe edition of Jelly Roll's tenth studio album, Beautifully Broken.

== Background ==
On an Instagram post, Machine Gun Kelly wrote "We worked on 'Lonely Road' for 2 years, 8 different studios, 4 different countries, changed the key 4 times". The song is in the key of G major with a tempo of 100 beats per minute.

== Composition and lyrics ==
The song centers on a man whose life is resulting in problems and failure and is now lonely. He reminisces on the joyful moments of his past, wondering what led to his current condition. The lyrics focus on struggling with love relationships, as well as alcohol addiction to cope with losses. Machine Gun Kelly sings in the melody of "Take Me Home, Country Roads" on the chorus: "Lonely road take me home / To the place where we went wrong / Where'd you go now?/ It's been a ghost town / And I'm still here / All alone".

== Music video ==
An official music video was directed by Sam Cahill and premiered on July 26, 2024. It stars Machine Gun Kelly and Jelly Roll along with their significant others, Megan Fox and Bunnie XO respectively, and depicts them as mechanics who are struggling to provide for their families. The visual opens with the artists attending a funeral, dressed in all black, before working alongside each other at an automobile repair shop in matching tan jumpsuits. In other scenes, Kelly kisses his pregnant wife's stomach, and Jelly Roll stands in a field as he sings and consoles his wife after they receive a letter confirming an infertility diagnosis. Eventually, after the two couples have a dinner party together, MGK hatches a plan to rob a bank, while Jelly Roll, being an ex-convict, refuses to return to a life of crime. MGK later leaves on his motorcycle and commits the robbery. He is arrested, but not before delivering the stolen money to his wife. Eight months later, MGK is visited in prison by his wife with their newborn daughter, and kisses his child through the glass. The baby girl in the video is another woman's child and Megan Fox is not actually pregnant.

== Charts ==
=== Weekly charts ===
Weekly chart performance for "Lonely Road"
Chart (2024)	Peak position
Australia (ARIA)	66
Canada Hot 100 (Billboard)	25
Global 200 (Billboard)	62
New Zealand Hot Singles (RMNZ)	4
Slovakia Airplay (ČNS IFPI)	58
UK Singles (Official Charts)	67
US Billboard Hot 100	33
US Adult Pop Airplay (Billboard)	18
US Hot Country Songs (Billboard)	13
US Hot Rock & Alternative Songs (Billboard)	7
US Pop Airplay (Billboard)	23

=== Monthly charts ===
Monthly chart performance for "Lonely Road"
Chart (2024)	Peak position
Slovakia (Rádio Top 100)	79

=== Year-end charts ===
2024 year-end chart performance for "Lonely Road"
Chart (2024)	Position
US Hot Country Songs (Billboard)	75
US Hot Rock & Alternative Songs (Billboard)	35

2025 year-end chart performance for "Lonely Road"
Chart (2025)	Position
US Hot Country Songs (Billboard)	94
US Hot Rock & Alternative Songs (Billboard)	28

== Certifications ==
Certifications for "Lonely Road"
Region	Certification	Certified units/sales
United Kingdom (BPI)	Silver	200,000^{‡}
^{‡} Sales+streaming figures based on certification alone.
