= List of number-one country singles of 2024 (Canada) =

Canada Country was a chart published weekly by Billboard magazine.

This 60-position chart listed the most popular country music songs, calculated weekly by airplay on 46 country music stations across Canada as monitored by Nielsen BDS. Songs were ranked by total plays. As with most other Billboard charts, the Canada Country chart featured a rule for when a song entered recurrent rotation. A song was declared recurrent if it had been on the chart longer than 30 weeks and was lower than number 20 in rank.

These are the Canadian number-one country singles of 2024, per the BDS Canada Country Airplay chart.

Issue date	Title	Artist	Ref.
January 6	"Thinkin' Bout Me"	Morgan Wallen	
January 13	"Thinkin' Bout Me"	Morgan Wallen	
January 20	"Save Me"	Jelly Roll featuring Lainey Wilson	
January 27	"Right Round Here"	Dean Brody	
February 3	"Where the Wild Things Are"	Luke Combs	
February 10	"Where the Wild Things Are"	Luke Combs	
February 17	"Where the Wild Things Are"	Luke Combs	
February 24	"Where the Wild Things Are"	Luke Combs	
March 2	"Where the Wild Things Are"	Luke Combs	
March 9	"The Painter"	Cody Johnson	
March 16	"The Painter"	Cody Johnson	
March 23	"Wildflowers and Wild Horses"	Lainey Wilson	
March 30	"The Painter"	Cody Johnson	
April 6	"Mamaw's House"	Thomas Rhett featuring Morgan Wallen	
April 13	"Man Made a Bar"	Morgan Wallen featuring Eric Church	
April 20	"Man Made a Bar"	Morgan Wallen featuring Eric Church	
April 27	"Man Made a Bar"	Morgan Wallen featuring Eric Church	
May 4	"Man Made a Bar"	Morgan Wallen featuring Eric Church	
May 11	"Outskirts"	Sam Hunt	
May 18	"Outskirts"	Sam Hunt	
May 25	"Outskirts"	Sam Hunt	
June 1	"Where It Ends"	Bailey Zimmerman	
June 8	"Where It Ends"	Bailey Zimmerman	
June 15	"Where It Ends"	Bailey Zimmerman	
June 22	"Where It Ends"	Bailey Zimmerman	
June 29	"Halfway to Hell"	Jelly Roll	
July 6	"I Had Some Help"	Post Malone featuring Morgan Wallen	
July 13	"I Had Some Help"	Post Malone featuring Morgan Wallen	
July 20	"I Had Some Help"	Post Malone featuring Morgan Wallen	
July 27	"I Had Some Help"	Post Malone featuring Morgan Wallen	
August 3	"I Had Some Help"	Post Malone featuring Morgan Wallen	
August 10	"A Bar Song (Tipsy)"	Shaboozey	
August 17	"A Bar Song (Tipsy)"	Shaboozey	
August 24	"Cowgirls"	Morgan Wallen featuring Ernest	
August 31	"Cowgirls"	Morgan Wallen featuring Ernest	
September 7	"Ain't No Love in Oklahoma"	Luke Combs	
September 14	"Ain't No Love in Oklahoma"	Luke Combs	
September 21	"Ain't No Love in Oklahoma"	Luke Combs	
September 28	"Chevrolet"	Dustin Lynch featuring Jelly Roll	
October 5	"Ain't No Love in Oklahoma"	Luke Combs	
October 12	"Ain't No Love in Oklahoma"	Luke Combs	
October 19	"Pour Me a Drink"	Post Malone featuring Blake Shelton	
October 26	"Pour Me a Drink"	Post Malone featuring Blake Shelton	
November 2	"Miles on It"	Marshmello featuring Kane Brown	

== See also ==
- 2024 in country music
- List of Billboard number-one country songs of 2024
