= NASCAR 25 =

2025 racing video game

- Cover art featuring Christopher Bell, William Byron, and Ryan Blaney (left to right)
- Developer: iRacing Studios
- Publisher: iRacing Studios
- Engine: Unreal Engine 5
- Platforms: PlayStation 5; Xbox Series X/S; Windows
- Release: PS5, Xbox Series X/S; October 14, 2025; Windows; November 11, 2025
- Genre: Sim racing
- Modes: Single-player, multiplayer

NASCAR 25 is a sim racing game published and developed by iRacing Studios that was released on October 14, 2025, for PlayStation 5 and Xbox Series X/S, and for Windows on November 11, 2025.

== Background ==
On October 5, 2023, it was announced that Motorsport Games sold the license for the exclusive NASCAR video game to iRacing. The sale was praised by drivers and fans alike. The sale, approved by NTP, saw the license transfer from 704Games, a wholly owned subsidiary of Motorsport Games, to iRacing, which began developing a NASCAR console game. All other NASCAR-related games were delisted from online stores in the buildup to the release.

== Development ==
On February 8, 2024, it was reported that NASCAR 25 would be developed on Unreal Engine, different from what was previously used in the NASCAR Heat series.

The developers released videos showcasing features of the game, as well as discussing the overall development of the game. The videos were published under the name "Dev Diary."

On January 22, 2025, iRacing announced that NASCAR Xfinity Series, NASCAR Craftsman Truck Series, and ARCA Menards Series will be featured in the game. They also reconfirmed the fall 2025 release date that was announced back in 2023. In June, the developers held a community Q&A on the official Discord server of NASCAR, and it was revealed that there were roughly 190 licensed drivers, and over 400 paint schemes to be added in the game.

== Gameplay ==
In the career mode feature of the game players will begin in the ARCA Menards Series, working in their backyard garage and work themselves up through the top 3 series of NASCAR. Players will also be able to hire staff, and upgrade components of their car. The official gameplay trailer was released on September 18.

== Downloadable content ==
The game features three downloadable content (DLC) packs. The October DLC was released on October 9, 2025, for players who pre-ordered the Gold Edition and October 14, 2025, for the full game's release. This initial pack features over 70 paint schemes and 30 firesuit designs across all four series.

Shortly after the PC release, iRacing announced that a DLC pack featuring the Darlington Throwback schemes would be available. The third and final DLC pack was released on December 12, 2025. Portland International Raceway, alongside a rescanned version of Sonoma Raceway, was added to the simulation in the January 2026 update.

== Soundtrack ==
Curation of the soundtrack was overseen by NASCAR Hall of Fame inductee Dale Earnhardt Jr. with assistance from Cup Series drivers Ryan Blaney and Bubba Wallace.

Song	Artist
"7000 Miles (Remix)"	Ruby Ibarra
"American Bliss"	Have Mercy
"Awaken"	Breaking Benjamin
"Big Dawgs"	Hanumankind, Kalmi
"Burn It Down"	Parker McCollum
"Can't Count Me Out"	Mr. Phelps
"Dream"	The Dangerous Summer
"Drivin' My Life Away"	Eddie Rabbitt
"F With U (Radio Edit)"	Ryan James
"Feel the Pain"	Dinosaur Jr.
"Flirtin' with Disaster"	Molly Hatchet
"Handle my Business"	Lit Squad
"Hypnotize"	System of a Down
"I Want the Power"	KC Carter
"Let's Go"	Black Prez x Kid Something
"Liar"	Jelly Roll
"Nobody Knows"	Killer Mike, Anthony Hamilton
"Out of the Black"	Royal Blood
"Party Like You"	The Cadillac Three
"Pulling Teeth"	Slow Joy
"Run Quick and Function"	The Proletariats
"Shipwreck"	Letdown
"Skin to Skin"	Greg Upchurch
"The Clincher"	Chevelle
"The Finger"	Bryce Leatherwood
"Time Bomb"	Whiskey Myers
"Weight"	Stuck Out
"Whippin"	Justin Starling
Underline: Starting screen theme song

== Reception ==
Reception

Aggregate scores
Aggregator	Score
Metacritic	73/100
OpenCritic	46% recommend

NASCAR 25 received "mixed or average" reviews according to review aggregator Metacritic. Fellow review aggregator OpenCritic assessed that the game received fair approval, being recommended by 46% of critics.
