= IRacing Studios =

American racing video game developer and publisher

iRacing Studios
- Wordmark logo
- Type: Private
- Industry: Video games, simulation
- Founded: September 2004; 22 years ago, in Chelmsford, Massachusetts, U.S.
- Founders: Dave Kaemmer; John W. Henry
- Area served: Worldwide
- Key people: Dave Kaemmer (CEO and CTO); Anthony Gardner (President and CFO); Dale Earnhardt Jr. (Executive Producer)
- Number of employees: 200+ (As of 2026)
- Website: iracingstudios.com

iRacing Studios is an American video game developer, publisher and esports event organizer based in Chelmsford, Massachusetts.

== History ==
=== 2003–2008; Development & Launch of iRacing ===
Following the closing of Papyrus Design Group in April 2004, NASCAR Racing 2003 Season's source code was sold to what is now iRacing Studios, then operating under the name FIRST.net. The code from that game would go onto become the basis for iRacing Studio's first and most prominent title, iRacing, which released in 2008.

In September 2004, Dave Kaemmer would partner with John W. Henry to officially form FIRST.net, LLC. During this time the studio would also first start using it's now famous laser scanning technique on tracks, through the use of LiDAR technology.

The exact date for when beta testing on iRacing began is unknown, however, the earliest confirmed date was in 2007 when a then 12-year-old Sage Karam stumbled into a beta key in the garage area of Las Vegas Motor Speedway. Beta testing lasted until June 11, 2008 with the game officially launching on August 26, 2008.

=== 2009–2020; Global Expansion ===
In 2009 the studio signed a 5-year agreement with both NASCAR and IndyCar to sanction their series on the iRacing service in their official lobbies.

From 2010 to 2011, they would start to expand iRacing globally out into Europe, Australia, and other parts of the world starting with the Australian V8 SuperCars Series.

In the early Spring of 2020, the service saw a rapid expansion due in direct part to the COVID-19 pandemic after NASCAR and IndyCar both setup globally broadcast eSports series on the service while on lockdown. During this time subscriptions to the service shot up almost 50%, the most it had ever seen in its 12 years online to that point.

=== 2021–Present; Studio Acquisitions & Expansion to console games ===
In December 2021 the studio would acquire Orontes Games. A month later in January 2022 they would acquire Monster Games, the developers of the then upcoming World of Outlaws game.

In 2022 the studio would announce and release their first title with developer Monster Games, with World of Outlaws: Dirt Racing which released in September of that year. The studio's second and final release in collaboration with Monster would be the sequel, World of Outlaws: Dirt Racing '24 in September 2024.

iRacing Studios and Orontes Games would announce on April 11, 2023 that their first title together, ExoCross, would be set for release on the PlayStation 4 and 5 as well as the Xbox Series S/X in the fall of that year.

In October 2023 the studio would obtain the license to NASCAR console video games from previous holder Motorsport Games. The studio's first release with the license would come on October 14, 2025 with the release of NASCAR 25.

In August 2025 the studio confirmed they had obtained the license to produce IndyCar console games from Motorsport Games. In 2026 the title was confirmed as INDYCAR Racing The Game with it being set for an early-2027 release date.

== Games ==
- iRacing (2008)
- World of Outlaws: Dirt Racing (2022)
- ExoCross (2024)
- World of Outlaws: Dirt Racing 24 (2024)
- NASCAR 25 (2025)
- iRacing Arcade (2026)
- NASCAR 26 (2026)
- INDYCAR Racing The Game (2027)
