= Beautifully Broken (album) =

- Standard edition cover; deluxe edition features a gold background

Studio album by Jelly Roll
- Released: October 11, 2024
- Studios: Saxman (Nashville); Little Big (Nashville); Sound of Sterloid (Nashville); Studio Phenix (Nashville)
- Genre: Country
- Length: 41:37
- Labels: Bailee & Buddy; This Is Hit; Stoney Creek; Republic
- Producers: BazeXX; Brock Berryhill; Charlie Handsome; Zach Crowell; Devin Dawson; Ben Johnson; MGK; The Monsters & Strangerz; Austin Nivarel; No Love for the Middle Child; John Ryan; SlimXX; Ryan Tedder; Isaiah Tejada; Alysa Vanderheym

Jelly Roll chronology
Whitsitt Chapel (2023)	Beautifully Broken (2024)

Singles from Beautifully Broken
- 1. "I Am Not Okay" Released: June 12, 2024; 2. "Liar" Released: August 2, 2024; 3. "Heart of Stone" Released: March 31, 2025

Professional ratings
Review scores
Source	Rating
Pitchfork	6.4/10
Rolling Stone	3.5/5 stars

Beautifully Broken is the tenth studio album by the American singer-songwriter Jelly Roll, released on October 11, 2024, through Bailee & Buddy, This Is Hit, and Republic Records. It includes collaborations with Ilsey Juber, Wiz Khalifa and Machine Gun Kelly on its standard edition, and additional collaborations with Halsey, Keith Urban, Ernest, Russ and Skylar Grey on its deluxe edition. Beautifully Broken was preceded by the singles "I Am Not Okay" and "Liar", with the song "Get By" also released prior to the album. It became Jelly Roll's first US number-one album. At the 68th Annual Grammy Awards, Beautifully Broken won the Grammy Award for Best Contemporary Country Album.

== Commercial performance ==
Beautifully Broken debuted at number one on the US Billboard 200 with 161,000 album-equivalent units, including 114,000 pure album sales. It is Jelly Roll's first number-one album in the US.

== Track listing ==
Beautifully Broken physical edition track listing
No.	Title	Writer(s)	Producer(s)	Length
1.	"Winning Streak"	Jason DeFord; Austin Nivarel; Joe Ragosta; Rob Ragosta	Zach Crowell; Nivarel	3:14
2.	"Burning"	DeFord; Z. Crowell; Ian Fitchuk; Ilsey Juber	Z. Crowell	2:51
3.	"Heart of Stone"	DeFord; Z. Crowell; Blake Pendergrass; Shy Carter	Z. Crowell	3:01
4.	"I Am Not Okay"	DeFord; Taylor Phillips; Ashley Gorley; Casey Brown	Z. Crowell	3:18
5.	"When the Drugs Don't Work" (featuring Ilsey)	DeFord; Juber; Vincent Pontare; Hillary Lindsey; Alysa Vanderheym	Z. Crowell	3:23
6.	"Higher Than Heaven" (featuring Wiz Khalifa)	DeFord; Cameron Thomaz; Phillips; Jessi Alexander; Brock Berryhill	Z. Crowell	2:49
7.	"Liar"	DeFord; Ben Johnson; Gorley; Phillips	Z. Crowell	3:24
8.	"Everyone Bleeds"	DeFord; Ryan Tedder; Stefan Johnson; Jordan K. Johnson; Amy Allen	The Monsters & Strangerz; Tedder^{[p]}; S. Johnson^{[v]}	2:22
9.	"Get By"	DeFord; Tedder; Michael Pollack; S. Johnson; J. Johnson; Jon Bellion	The Monsters & Strangerz; Tedder^{[p]}; S. Johnson^{[v]}	2:40
10.	"Unpretty"	DeFord; Tedder; S. Johnson; J. Johnson; A. Allen	The Monsters & Strangerz; Tedder^{[p]}; S. Johnson^{[v]}	2:44
11.	"Grace"	DeFord; Juber; Fitchuk; B. Johnson	Z. Crowell	2:51
12.	"What It Takes"	DeFord; Josh Hoge; Josh Miller; Z. Crowell	Z. Crowell	3:13
13.	"Hey Mama"	DeFord; Chris LaCorte; Jaxson Free; Phillips; Pendergrass	Z. Crowell	2:36
14.	"Time of Day" (featuring MGK)	DeFord; Colson Baker; Z. Crowell; Juber; Gorley; Michael Wayne Atha; Brandon Allen; Stephen Basil	Z. Crowell; MGK; BazeXX; SlimXX; No Love for the Middle Child	3:11
Total length:				41:37

Beautifully Broken digital edition additional tracks
No.	Title	Writer(s)	Producer(s)	Length
15.	"Born Again"	DeFord; Devin Dawson; Free; Steph Jones; Vanderheym	Vanderheym; Dawson	2:36
16.	"Guilty"	DeFord; Berryhill; Jessie Jo Dillon; Gorley; Jacob Hackworth; B. Johnson; Phillips; Ryan Vojtesak	B. Johnson; Berryhill; Charlie Handsome; Denis Kosiak^{[v]}	2:52
17.	"Little Light"	DeFord; Gregory Hein; Alexander Izquierdo; J. Johnson; S. Johnson; John Ryan; Isaiah Tejada	Tejada; Ryan; The Monsters & Strangerz; Kosiak^{[v]}; S. Johnson^{[v]}	3:00
18.	"Hear Me Out"	DeFord; Dawson; Free; Jones; Vanderheym	Vanderheym; Dawson	2:37
19.	"Woman"	DeFord; Joe Fox; Juber; Joe Reeves; Geoff Warburton	Charlie Handsome	3:19
20.	"Smile So Much"	DeFord; Rocky Block; John Byron; Christopher Comstock; B. Johnson; Pendergrass; Vojtesak	B. Johnson; Charlie Handsome	3:14
21.	"My Cross"	DeFord; Fox; Juber; Vojtesak; Warburton	Charlie Handsome; Kosiak^{[v]}	2:12
22.	"What's Wrong with Me"	DeFord; Block; Byron; Pendergrass; Vojtesak	Charlie Handsome	3:08
Total length:				64:35

Beautifully Broken (Pickin' Up the Pieces) deluxe edition additional tracks
No.	Title	Writer(s)	Producer(s)	Length
23.	"Take a Bow" (with Halsey)	DeFord; Z. Crowell; Ashley Frangipane; Hackworth; Lindsey; Pendergrass	Z. Crowell	3:40
24.	"Don't Want To" (with Keith Urban)	DeFord; Fox; Juber; Reeves; Warburton	Charlie Handsome	3:18
25.	"Devil Down" (with Ernest)	DeFord; Berryhill; Dillon; Hackworth; Phillips	B. Johnson; Berryhill	2:16
26.	"Really Gone" (with Russ)	DeFord; Block; Byron; Pendergrass; Russell Vitale; Vojtesak	Charlie Handsome; Russ^{[a]}	3:05
27.	"Past Yesterday" (with Skylar Grey)	DeFord; Dillon; Jesse Frasure; Holly Hafermann; Pendergrass	Nivarel; Z. Crowell	3:13
28.	"Lonely Road" (with MGK)	DeFord; B. Allen; Baker; Travis Barker; Basil; John Denver; Nick Long; Mary Nivert-Danoff	BazeXX; Charlie Handsome; Barker; SlimXX	3:09
Total length:				83:16

=== Notes ===
- ^{^[p]} signifies a primary and vocal producer.
- ^{^[a]} signifies an additional producer.
- ^{^[v]} signifies a vocal producer.

== Personnel ==
Credits adapted from Tidal.

=== Musicians ===
- Jelly Roll – vocals
- Zach Crowell – programming (tracks 1–7, 11–13, 23, 27), keyboards (1–7, 11–13), background vocals (4, 11), piano (23, 27)
- Nathan Keeterle – acoustic guitar (1–5, 7, 11–13, 23, 27), electric guitar (2–7, 11, 12, 23, 27)
- Devin Malone – bass (1, 2, 4, 6, 12, 23, 27), electric guitar (1); lap steel, mandolin (2); acoustic guitar (4, 12, 23), pedal steel (4)
- Grady Saxman – drums (1, 4, 6, 12, 23, 27)
- Sol Philcox-Littlefield – electric guitar (1, 6, 12, 13, 23, 25, 27)
- Austin Nivarel – background vocals, electric guitar (1, 27); keyboards, programming (1)
- Joe Ragosta – background vocals (1)
- Rob Ragosta – background vocals (1)
- Aaron Sterling – drums (2, 3, 7, 13, 15, 18)
- Ilsey – background vocals (2), vocals (5)
- Carole Rabinowitz – cello (3–5, 23)
- Elizabeth Lamb – viola (3–5, 23)
- David Angell – violin (3–5, 23)
- David Davidson – violin (3, 4, 23); string arrangement (3–5)
- Ben Caver – background vocals (6)
- Wiz Khalifa – vocals (6)
- Ben Johnson – background vocals (7, 25), acoustic guitar (16, 20, 25), programming (16, 25); bass, keyboards (16); Dobro (20, 25), mandolin (25)
- Jordan K. Johnson – keyboards, programming (8–10, 17); background vocals, instruments, piano (8–10); drums (17)
- Stefan Johnson – keyboards, programming (8–10, 17); background vocals, instruments, piano (8–10); drums (17)
- Ryan Tedder – background vocals, guitars, keyboards, instruments, piano, programming (8–10)
- MarQo Patton – choir vocals (8–10)
- Kellee Halford – choir vocals (8–10)
- Olivia Jones – choir vocals (8–10)
- Tamica Harris – choir vocals (8–10)
- Shannon Sanders – choir vocals (8–10)
- Pierre-Luc Rioux – guitars (8–10)
- Amy Allen – instruments, programming (8)
- MGK – vocals (14, 28)
- BazeXX – keyboards, piano (14); programming, synthesizer (28)
- Yelawolf – background vocals (14)
- No Love for the Middle Child – cello (14)
- Alysa Vanderheym – background vocals, keyboards (15, 18); acoustic guitar, banjo (15); electric guitar, programming (18)
- Jonny Fung – electric guitar (15, 18), acoustic guitar (18)
- Craig Young – bass (15, 18)
- Caitlin Evanson – fiddle (15, 18)
- Devin Dawson – piano (15, 18)
- Jaxson Free – background vocals (15)
- Steph Jones – background vocals (15)
- Alex Wright – keyboards (16, 19–21, 24–26)
- Todd Lombardo – acoustic guitar, electric guitar (16, 19–21, 24, 26)
- Evan Hutchings – drums (16, 19–21, 24, 26)
- Jimmie Lee Sloas – bass (16, 20, 21)
- Brock Berryhill – programming (16, 25)
- Lauren Conklin – cello, viola, violin (16); fiddle (25)
- Charlie Handsome – programming (16), guitars (28)
- John Ryan – background vocals, drums, guitars, programming (17)
- Alex Strahle – banjo, Dobro, guitars, lap steel, mandolin, slide guitar (17)
- Isaiah Tejada – bass, drums, programming (17)
- Tyler Tomlinson – electric guitar (18)
- Michael Rinne – bass (19, 24, 26)
- Hillary Lindsey – background vocals (23)
- Halsey – vocals (23)
- Keith Urban – vocals (24), electric guitar (24)
- Ernest – vocals (25)
- Russ – vocals (26)
- Madeline Merlo – background vocals (27)
- Skylar Grey – vocals (27)
- SlimXX – programming, synthesizer (28)
- The Castellows – background vocals (28)
- Travis Barker – drums (28)

=== Technical ===
- Aidan Thompson – engineering (1, 4, 6, 12, 23, 27)
- Grady Saxman – engineering (1, 4, 6, 12, 23, 27)
- Shaan Singh – engineering (8–10, 12, 14, 28)
- Stefan Johnson – engineering (8–10)
- Ryan Tedder – engineering (8–10)
- Aaron Sterling – engineering (13), additional engineering (15, 18)
- Denis Kosiak – engineering (15–18, 20–22, 25)
- Alysa Vanderheym – engineering, editing (15, 18)
- Trent Woodman – engineering (16, 19–22, 24, 26)
- Brock Berryhill – engineering (25), additional engineering (16)
- Ben Johnson – engineering (25), additional engineering (16)
- Ernest – engineering (25)
- Taylor Pollert – strings engineering (4, 23)
- Zach Crowell – additional engineering (1, 4, 6, 12, 13, 23, 27)
- Jonny Fung – additional engineering (15, 18)
- Craig Young – additional engineering (15, 18)
- Sean Matsukawa – additional engineering (23)
- Austin Nivarel – additional engineering, editing (27)
- Andrew Boullianne – engineering assistance (16, 19–22, 26)
- Chris Small – editing (15, 18)
- Sean Spence – editing (16)
- Jim Cooley – mixing (1–6, 11–16, 18–27)
- Jeff Braun – mixing (7)
- Serban Ghenea – mixing (8–10, 17, 28)
- Zach Kuhlman – mixing assistance (1–6, 11–16, 18–27)
- Bryce Bordone – mixing assistance (8–10, 17)
- Andrew Mendelson – mastering (1–27)
- Chris Gehringer – mastering (28)
- Adam Battershell – mastering assistance (1–27)
- Luke Armentrout – mastering assistance (1–27)
- Scott Johnson – production management (1–14, 16, 20, 23, 25, 27)
- David "Dsilb" Silberstein – production management (8–10, 17)
- Jeremy "Jboogs" Levin – production management (8–10, 17)
- Christian "C" Johnson – production management (8–10, 17)
- Alyson McAnally – production management (15, 18)
- Ally Gecewicz – production management (16, 19–21, 24, 26)

== Charts ==
=== Weekly charts ===
Weekly chart performance for Beautifully Broken
Chart (2024)	Peak position
Australian Albums (ARIA)	19
Australian Country Albums (ARIA)	3
Canadian Albums (Billboard)	3
New Zealand Albums (RMNZ)	22
Scottish Albums (Official Charts)	18
UK Albums (Official Charts)	41
UK Country Albums (Official Charts)	1
US Billboard 200	1
US Top Country Albums (Billboard)	1

=== Year-end charts ===
2024 year-end chart performance for Beautifully Broken
Chart (2024)	Position
Australian Country Albums (ARIA)	36

2025 year-end chart performance for Beautifully Broken
Chart (2025)	Position
Australian Albums (ARIA)	98
Canadian Albums (Billboard)	32
US Billboard 200	20
US Top Country Albums (Billboard)	5

== Certifications ==
Certifications for Beautifully Broken
Region	Certification	Certified units/sales
Canada (Music Canada)	Platinum	80,000^{‡}
New Zealand (RMNZ) Deluxe edition	Gold	7,500^{‡}
United Kingdom (BPI)	Silver	60,000^{‡}
United States (RIAA)	Platinum	1,000,000^{‡}
^{‡} Sales+streaming figures based on certification alone.

== Accolades ==
Year-end lists
Publication	Rank	List
Billboard	10	The 10 Best Country Albums of 2024
Taste of Country	4	The 10 Best Country Albums of 2024
