= Liar (Jelly Roll song) =

2024 single by Jelly Roll

Single by Jelly Roll

from the album Beautifully Broken
- Released: August 2, 2024
- Genre: Country rock
- Length: 3:25
- Label: Bailee & Buddy
- Songwriters: Jason DeFord; Ben Johnson; Ashley Gorley; Taylor Phillips
- Producer: Zach Crowell

Jelly Roll singles chronology
"Lonely Road" (2024)	"Liar" (2024)	"Losers" (2025)

Music video
- "Liar" on YouTube

"Liar" is a song by American singer Jelly Roll, released on August 2, 2024, as the second single from his tenth studio album, Beautifully Broken. It was written by Jelly Roll himself, Ben Johnson, Ashley Gorley and Taylor Phillips, and produced by Zach Crowell.

== Background ==
Jelly Roll debuted the song at the Grand Ole Opry on April 16, 2024, during which he told the audience that he might not ever release it. He performed it again at the 59th Academy of Country Music Awards on May 16, 2024. In an interview prior to the ACMs, he said he was still "on the fence" about releasing the song. On August 2, the song was officially released to streaming services.

Liar was used as one of the official theme songs for WWE Summerslam 2024 and was performed live at the event by Jelly Roll. It will also be on the soundtrack for the NASCAR 25 video game.

== Composition and lyrics ==
The song revolves around Jelly Roll confronting his addictions and harmful thoughts, which he depicts as a voice in his head encouraging him to continue with substance abuse and materialism and convincing him that he is too heartbroken to find love. Jelly Roll acknowledges the detrimental effects of succumbing to his temptations and is ready to overcome them, telling his inner voice in the chorus: "You ain't nothin' but a liar / Yeah, I walk right out the fire / Yeah, you try to keep me down / Try to put me underground / But I'm only going higher". The instrumental consists of guitar riffs, drum beats and a choir of vocals in the background.

== Music video ==
The music video was released alongside the single. It sees Jelly Roll singing the song in the middle of a dark, dilapidated living room, while also facing his reflection in a mirror during the chorus.

== Charts ==
=== Weekly charts ===
Weekly chart performance for "Liar"
Chart (2024–2025)	Peak position
Australia Country Hot 50 (The Music)	1
Canada Hot 100 (Billboard)	31
Canada All-Format Airplay (Billboard)	1
Canada Country (Billboard)	1
Canada Rock (Billboard)	12
US Billboard Hot 100	31
US Country Airplay (Billboard)	1
US Hot Country Songs (Billboard)	5
US Hot Rock & Alternative Songs (Billboard)	5
US Rock & Alternative Airplay (Billboard)	6

=== Year-end charts ===
2024 year-end chart performance for "Liar"
Chart (2024)	Position
US Hot Rock & Alternative Songs (Billboard)	85

2025 year-end chart performance for "Liar"
Chart (2025)	Position
Canada (Canadian Hot 100)	60
Canada Country (Billboard)	12
Canada Mainstream Rock (Billboard)	29
US Billboard Hot 100	86
US Country Airplay (Billboard)	5
US Hot Country Songs (Billboard)	18
US Hot Rock & Alternative Songs (Billboard)	8
US Rock & Alternative Airplay (Billboard)	28

== Certifications ==
Certifications for "Liar"
Region	Certification	Certified units/sales
Canada (Music Canada)	Platinum	80,000^{‡}
New Zealand (RMNZ)	Platinum	30,000^{‡}
United Kingdom (BPI)	Silver	200,000^{‡}
United States (RIAA)	Platinum	1,000,000^{‡}
^{‡} Sales+streaming figures based on certification alone.
