= Waterloo Revival =

- Origin: Austin, Texas
- Genre: Country
- Years active: 2013-2021
- Labels: Big Machine, Show Dog-Universal Music
- Past members: Cody Cooper; George Birge

Waterloo Revival was an American country music duo consisting of vocalists Cody Cooper and George Birge. The duo released two singles through Big Machine Records.

== History ==
Cody Cooper and George Birge, natives of Austin, Texas, had been friends since middle school when they began performing music together. After high school, Birge worked in real estate and Cooper worked in mortgaging. The two reunited in 2013 and began writing songs and performing together. They took the name Waterloo Revival from the original name of the city of Austin.

The duo released a five-song extended play, and then signed to Big Machine Records, which released two singles: "Hit the Road" and "Bad for You".

In June 2016 Waterloo Revival signed to Toby Keith's record label Show Dog-Universal Music.

In 2017 the duo released a new single "What Guy Wouldn't" reaching the Top 40 on the Music Row charts. In 2018 they released a three-song EP "Wonder Woman".

Waterloo Revival broke up in February 2021. Afterward, Birge became a solo artist, starting with his single "Beer Beer, Truck Truck".

== Discography ==
=== Extended plays ===
Title	Details
Little Lightning	Released: March 28, 2013; Label: self-released; Format: Digital download
Front Row	Released: March 10, 2016; Label: self-released; Format: Digital download

=== Singles ===
Year	Single	Peak chart positions
Year	Single	US Country Airplay
2015	"Hit the Road"	51
2015	"Bad for You"	52
2016	"Backwood Bump"	—
2017	"What Guy Wouldn't"	—
2018	"Wonder Woman"	—

=== Music videos ===
Year	Video	Director
2015	"Bad for You"	Brian Lazzaro
2016	"Backwood Bump"	William Gawley
