= It Won't Be Long (George Birge song) =

2025 single by George Birge

Single by George Birge
- Released: January 17, 2025
- Genre: Country pop
- Length: 3:17
- Label: Records Nashville
- Songwriters: George Birge; Joe Fox; Chase McGill; Trannie Anderson
- Producer: Joe Fox

George Birge singles chronology
"Cowboy Songs" (2024)	"It Won't Be Long" (2025)	"Ride, Ride, Ride" (2026)

Music video
- "It Won't Be Long" on YouTube

"It Won't Be Long" is a song by American country music singer George Birge. It was released on January 17, 2025, as the lead single from his upcoming second studio album. It was written by Birge himself, Joe Fox (who also produced the song), Chase McGill and Trannie Anderson.

== Background ==
George Birge created the song during a co-writing session with the other songwriters on October 22, 2024 at the Liz Rose Music offices in Nashville, Tennessee, where Fox had a room with a piano. The hook was inspired by a previous conversation between Birge and his wife Kara about how fast their life seemed to be moving. The song was composed primarily on guitar, but as they finished, Fox segued to piano, which he thought reflected the song's emotional content more effectively. He layered the piano part with guitar to create the foundation for a demo. By the end of the week, the writers had designated it as Birge's next single and picked a date to send it to radio. Fox was enlisted to produce the song. He built a new instrumental framework using Birge's lead vocal and Anderson's harmonies from the demo, and had Birge change a couple of notes in his vocal.

== Composition ==
"It Won't Be Long" is a country pop song about appreciating the simple but meaningful parts of life. It is composed of piano, guitars (including steel guitar and Dobro), bass, drums, and a single synthesizer note underneath that plays throughout the entire song. The lyrics incorporate major events of George Birge's life—the first verse focuses on his relationship with Kara and the second references his renovation of a dilapidated house and participation in Little League Baseball during childhood. The chorus encapsulates the overall theme of the narrative and changes in melody halfway through, while the bridge ties together three generations of his family.

== Music video ==
The music video was directed by Corey Miller and released alongside the single. It features intimate moments with George Birge's sons.

== Charts ==
Chart performance for "It Won't Be Long"
Chart (2025–2026)	Peak position
Canada Country (Billboard)	31
US Billboard Hot 100	56
US Country Airplay (Billboard)	3
US Hot Country Songs (Billboard)	20
