= I Am Not Okay =

2024 single by Jelly Roll

Single by Jelly Roll

from the album Beautifully Broken
- Written: October 2023
- Released: June 12, 2024
- Recorded: Saxman, Nashville, Tennessee
- Genre: Country
- Length: 3:17
- Label: Bailee & Buddy; This Is Hit; Republic
- Songwriters: Jason DeFord; Taylor Phillips; Ashley Gorley; Casey Brown
- Producer: Zach Crowell

Jelly Roll singles chronology
"All My Life" (2024)	"I Am Not Okay" (2024)	"Somebody Save Me" (2024)

"I Am Not Okay" is a song by American singer Jelly Roll, released on June 12, 2024, as the lead single from his tenth studio album, Beautifully Broken. It was written by Jelly Roll, Taylor Phillips, Ashley Gorley, and Casey Brown, and produced by Zach Crowell.

== Background ==
Jelly Roll debuted the song at the season 25 finale of The Voice on May 21, 2024. He also performed it at the CMA Fest on June 8, 2024, prior to releasing the song, and again during the In Memoriam segment at the 76th Primetime Emmy Awards. When announcing the release on Instagram, he wrote the song is "for everyone going through something".

== Composition and lyrics ==
Jelly Roll wrote "I Am Not Okay" with Taylor Phillips, Ashley Gorley, and Casey Brown, while on tour in North Carolina in October 2023. After witnessing the crowd's emotional reaction, Phillips remarked that attending Jelly Roll's concert was akin to going to church, which prompted Jelly Roll to say that he was making it "OK for people not to be OK", which inspired the song's hook. Gorley noted that he had hoped to develop a song about depression, spurred in part by Phillips' annual benefits to honor his friend, Brian Kindle, who died by suicide.

Produced by Zach Crowell at Saxman Studios, the instrumental starts with the plucking of acoustic guitar during the opening verse, before being joined by drums, synthesizers and orchestra. Lyrically, Jelly Roll revolves around his emotional pain and struggles with mental health, mentioning having sleepless nights, voices in his head, good and bad days, and not wanting to be out of bed. In the chorus, he acknowledges there are others in a similar position and encourages hope.

== Charts ==
=== Weekly charts ===
Weekly chart performance for "I Am Not Okay"
Chart (2024–2025)	Peak position
Canada Hot 100 (Billboard)	29
Canada Country (Billboard)	1
Canada Top 40 (Mediabase)	48
Global 200 (Billboard)	98
US Billboard Hot 100	14
US Adult Contemporary (Billboard)	12
US Adult Pop Airplay (Billboard)	5
US Country Airplay (Billboard)	1
US Hot Country Songs (Billboard)	3
US Pop Airplay (Billboard)	15

=== Year-end charts ===
2024 year-end chart performance for "I Am Not Okay"
Chart (2024)	Position
US Billboard Hot 100	75
US Adult Top 40 (Billboard)	47
US Country Airplay (Billboard)	50
US Hot Country Songs (Billboard)	21

2025 year-end chart performance for "I Am Not Okay"
Chart (2025)	Position
US Billboard Hot 100	79
US Adult Contemporary (Billboard)	20
US Adult Pop Airplay (Billboard)	27
US Country Airplay (Billboard)	27
US Hot Country Songs (Billboard)	21

== Certifications ==
Certifications for "I Am Not Okay"
Region	Certification	Certified units/sales
Canada (Music Canada)	2× Platinum	160,000^{‡}
New Zealand (RMNZ)	Gold	15,000^{‡}
United States (RIAA)	2× Platinum	2,000,000^{‡}
^{‡} Sales+streaming figures based on certification alone.

== Release history ==
Release history and formats for "I Am Not Okay"
Region	Date	Format(s)	Version(s)	Label	Ref.
United States	June 18, 2024	Contemporary hit radio	Original	Bailee & Buddy; This Is Hit; Republic	
