= Heart of Stone (Jelly Roll song) =

2025 song by Jelly Roll

Single by Jelly Roll

from the album Beautifully Broken
- Released: March 31, 2025
- Genre: Country
- Length: 3:01
- Label: Bailee & Buddy; This Is Hit; Stoney Creek
- Songwriters: Jason DeFord; Zach Crowell; Blake Pendergrass; Shy Carter
- Producer: Crowell

Jelly Roll singles chronology
"Hard Fought Hallelujah" (2025)	"Heart of Stone" (2025)	"Bloodline" (2025)

"Heart of Stone" is a song by American singer Jelly Roll from his tenth studio album, Beautifully Broken (2024). It was released as the album's third single on March 31, 2025. The song was written by Jelly Roll, Zach Crowell, Blake Pendergrass and Shy Carter and produced by Crowell.

== Background ==
In an interview with Jay Shetty on the On Purpose podcast, Jelly Roll revealed that "Heart of Stone" was his favorite song on Beautifully Broken. He stated "I think these lyrics say the most in this whole album" and considered it the track that best summarizes the theme of "who do you stand for and what do you stand by". He continued to comment:

I love songs when you can read a song, and it's impactful. As a songwriter, that's it. Most of the time, our message is in the melody. If you don't have the melody there, it'll kind of be like, "Ah, that didn't sound as cool as I thought it did when I just read it flat." But when I read "Heart of Stone", I get goosebumps reading that, and I wrote it.

== Composition and lyrics ==
The song is composed of acoustic guitar and percussion in the instrumental. It finds Jelly Roll aiming to change from his bad habits, as he asks God to help him in the lyrics, which also offer a message of hope to those in his situation. The style of the song has been described as close to Imagine Dragons and the "intersection of Twenty One Pilots and Gnarls Barkley."

== Critical reception ==
Billy Dukes of Taste of Country gave a positive review, writing "the up-tempo prayer soon fills out to match the strength of past productions." Jessica Nicholson of Billboard ranked "Heart of Stone" as the 16th best song from Beautifully Broken.

== Charts ==
=== Weekly charts ===
Weekly chart performance for "Heart of Stone"
Chart (2025)	Peak position
Canada Hot 100 (Billboard)	65
Canada Country (Billboard)	2
UK Country Airplay (Radiomonitor)	1
US Billboard Hot 100	53
US Country Airplay (Billboard)	1
US Hot Country Songs (Billboard)	14
US Hot Rock & Alternative Songs (Billboard)	6

=== Year-end charts ===
Year-end chart performance for "Heart of Stone"
Chart (2025)	Position
Canada Country (Billboard)	60
US Country Airplay (Billboard)	23
US Hot Country Songs (Billboard)	71
US Hot Rock & Alternative Songs (Billboard)	17
