= Cowboy Songs (song) =

Single by George Birge

from the EP Cowboy Songs
- Released: April 5, 2024
- Genre: Country
- Length: 3:09
- Label: Records Nashville
- Songwriters: George Birge; Matt McGinn; Michael Tyler; Lalo Guzman
- Producers: Lalo Guzman; Matt McGinn

George Birge singles chronology
"Amy's Back in Austin" (2024)	"Cowboy Songs" (2024)	"It Won't Be Long" (2025)

"Cowboy Songs" is a song by American country music singer George Birge. He wrote the song with Michael Tyler, Lalo Guzman, and Matt McGinn, the latter two of whom also produced it.

== Content ==
George Birge wrote "Cowboy Songs" in 2023 during a songwriting session with Matt McGinn. McGinn had the lyric "she only dances to cowboy songs", and Tyler suggested making the line into "something you wouldn't expect". The four writers then came up with a premise of a barroom encounter between a man and woman. In the process of recording the song, Birge drank tequila to affect the tone of his voice. Overall, McGinn and Guzman spent over 17 hours coming up with a suitable sound for the song, which includes steel guitar and Dobro.

Birge said that he thought the song was suitable for recording after presenting it to his wife.

In December 2024, the song became Birge's first number-one single on Country Airplay.

== Chart performance ==
=== Weekly charts ===
Weekly chart performance for "Cowboy Songs"
Chart (2024–2025)	Peak position
Canada All-Format Airplay (Billboard)	5
Canada Country (Billboard)	1
US Billboard Hot 100	100
US Country Airplay (Billboard)	1
US Hot Country Songs (Billboard)	18

=== Year-end charts ===
Year-end chart performance for "Cowboy Songs"
Chart (2025)	Position
Canada Country (Billboard)	22
US Country Airplay (Billboard)	43
US Hot Country Songs (Billboard)	77
