= George Birge =

- Born: Austin, Texas, U.S.
- Origin: Nashville, Tennessee, U.S.
- Genre: Country
- Occupation: Singer-songwriter
- Instruments: Vocals, guitar
- Years active: 2013–present
- Label: Records Nashville
- Formerly of: Waterloo Revival

George Birge is an American country music artist. From 2013 to 2020, he was one half of the duo Waterloo Revival with Cody Cooper. Birge began recording independently in 2021. After his independent release "Beer Beer, Truck Truck" went viral on social media in 2021, Birge signed to Records Nashville. He has charted the singles "Mind on You" and "Cowboy Songs" on this label, with the latter reaching number one on Country Airplay in 2024.

== Biography ==
George Birge was born in Austin, Texas. He began singing when he was 14 years old, and began writing songs with his friend Cody Cooper when both were still teenagers. The two separated after high school, but reunited in 2013 when Cooper returned to Austin to visit his family. From 2013 to 2020, the two recorded on Big Machine Records as the duo Waterloo Revival.

After Waterloo Revival broke up in 2021, Birge began writing songs by himself, including cuts by Matt Stell and Chris Lane, along with Rascal Flatts member Gary LeVox. Clay Walker also recorded Birge's songs "Need a Bar Sometimes" and "Catchin' Up with an Old Memory", both of which he released as singles. In late 2021, Walker encouraged Birge to release his songs on the social media platform TikTok. This led to his song "Beer Beer, Truck Truck" gaining attention on the platform late in the year. Due to this song's success, Birge signed with Records Nashville, an independent label in Nashville, Tennessee. He released a single titled "Mind on You" through the label in 2022.

"Mind on You" debuted at number 58 on the Billboard Country Airplay chart dated August 8, 2022, peaking at number 2 on the chart in January 2024. At the end of the year, his next Records Nashville release "Cowboy Songs" became his first number one on the same chart. In January 2025, Birge's next Records Nashville release, "It Won't Be Long" became his third single at country radio and peaked at number 3 on the Country Airplay chart.

== Discography ==
=== Studio albums ===
List of studio albums, with selected details
Title	Album details
George Birge: Mind on You	Release date: May 12, 2023; Label: Records Nashville

=== Extended plays ===
List of EPs, with selected details
Title	EP details
George Birge	Release date: February 18, 2022; Label: Records Nashville
Cowboy Songs	Release date: April 5, 2024; Label: Records Nashville

=== Singles ===
List of singles, with selected chart positions
Year	Title	Peak chart positions					Album
Year	Title	US	US Country	US Country Airplay	CAN Country	NZ Hot	Album
2021	"Beer Beer, Truck Truck"	—	—	—	—	—	George Birge: Mind on You
2022	"Mind on You"	62	16	2	46	—	George Birge: Mind on You
2023	"Amy's Back in Austin" (with Eli Young Band)	—	—	59	—	—	—N/a
2024	"Cowboy Songs"	100	18	1	1	—	Cowboy Songs
2025	"It Won't Be Long"	56	20	3	31	—	TBA
2026	"Ride, Ride, Ride" (featuring Luke Bryan)	— (Note: "Ride, Ride, Ride" did not enter the Billboard Hot 100, but peaked at number 15 on the Bubbling Under Hot 100 chart.)	39	12	10	38	TBA
