= IRacing =

2008 sim racing video game

iRacing
- Developer: iRacing Studios
- Publisher: iRacing Studios
- Designer: Dave Kaemmer
- Platform: Microsoft Windows
- Release: August 26, 2008; 18 years ago
- Genre: Sim racing
- Modes: Single-player, multiplayer

iRacing is a subscription-based online sim racing video game developed and published by iRacing Studios in 2008. All in-game sessions are hosted on the publisher's servers. The game simulates real world cars, tracks, and racing events, and enforces rules of conduct modeled on real auto racing events.

== Gameplay ==
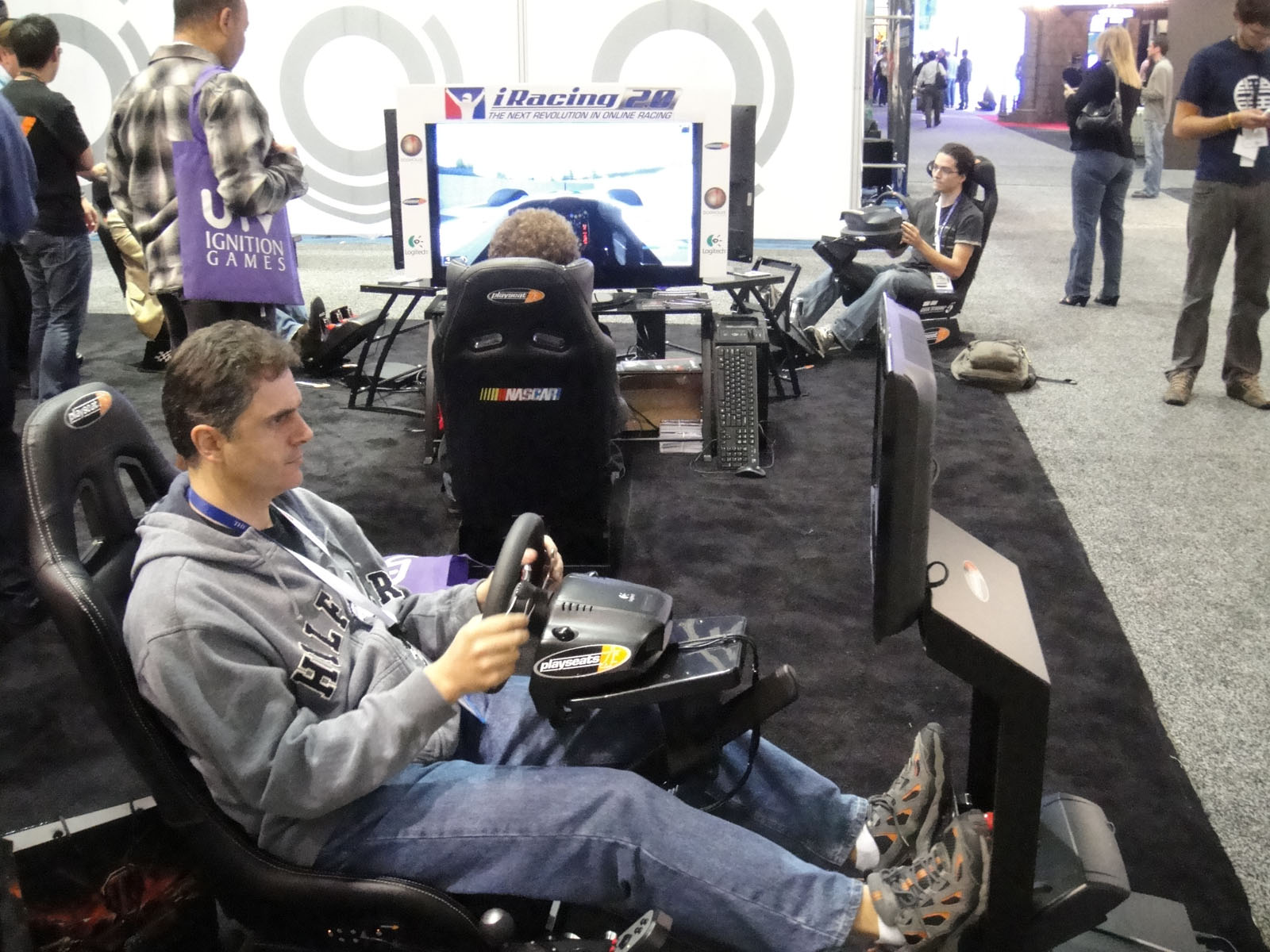
Players using a sim-racing rig, demoing iRacing at E3 2011

iRacing primarily focuses on creating an environment in game that will mimic real-life driving as closely as possible, including the use of LIDAR-scanned cars and tracks. In most circumstances, players are confined to a cockpit-only view when driving. iRacing offers a day-night-cycle, offering more dynamic racing due to temperature variation and limited sight at night. As of 2024, iRacing also added a realistic dynamic weather model, simulating rain and fog with its respective effects on the track's surface and temperature.

Racing wheels and gamepads are supported, as are adaptive controllers and other auxiliary input devices. iRacing also supports the use of VR headsets. Support for computer-controlled opponents was added in late 2019. Initially limited to a small selection of tracks and cars, the developer has gradually added support for more of the game's content.

== Online play ==
=== Racing seasons and series ===
iRacing.com operates in seasons lasting 13 (rarely 14) weeks, four seasons per year. New content and features are typically released in the week before the start of a new season. iRacing.com sanctions many different race series on its service, some of which are meant to correspond to race series held in real life. These are called official series, and can be ranked or unranked. In ranked series, the player's performance affects their iRating and Safety Rating. With few exceptions, a series uses one car, one class of cars, or a few car classes throughout the entire season. Typically, a series runs on a different track each week of the season for 12 (rarely 13) weeks. In the last week of the season, so-called Week 13, most regular official ranked series are suspended, and temporarily replaced by unranked races designed to showcase the new, just released content, and to provide a slightly more relaxed racing experience.

There are five disciplines of auto racing available for players: sports cars (cars with fenders), formula cars, oval, dirt road (composed of rallycross and trophy truck racing), and dirt oval. Before early 2024, sports cars and single-seater (formula) cars were included in a single road discipline. Each series has three session types for the given week: Open practice, Race, or Time Trial. In most cases, a Race session is immediately preceded by a short two-lap lone Qualifying session which determines the starting order for the race. Some series use detached Qualifying session, whereby the best lap time achieved by the player in any Qualifying session they participated determines their relative starting position for all subsequent races in this week. Each series has its own seasonal championship for Race and Time Trial, and also a separate, non-series based Time Attack mode. Users are allowed to create their own race or practice sessions and their own full series and seasons using iRacing's Hosted Sessions and Leagues features, respectively. Hosted races and leagues are always unranked.

=== License classes ===
After the "Rookie" license, which all players start at, iRacing uses a letter-grade licensing system, with grades of D, C, B, and A, from lowest to highest. There is also a Pro license, which is reserved for drivers who qualify for the premier eSports series hosted by iRacing.com, such as the eNASCAR iRacing Series and the Porsche eSports Supercup. Licenses are specific to each of five iRacing disciplines. Advancement of a license class is determined by a player's participation in sessions that have a minimum required license that isn't lower than the player's current license (called a Minimum Participation Requirement), and advancement of safety rating. Official series require a minimum license level to participate, e.g. to participate in a race in a C-level series, the player must possess a C, B or A license, while players with Rookie or D licenses generally are not allowed to join such race.

=== Safety rating system ===
The safety rating system in iRacing is a no-blame system for determining how "safe" a player is on the track by assigning "incident points" for events such as going off the track, losing control of the car, and contact with an object (usually a barrier or wall) or another car. At the end of an official race session, the ratio of corners driven to incident points incurred ("corners per incident", CPI) is calculated over a large number of most recent corners, usually covering more than the most recent race. The exact number of corners depends on the player's current license level. The resulting CPI figure determines the player's Safety Rating, calculated separately for each iRacing discipline. Players can be penalized in-race or disqualified from a session for incurring too many incident points. In case of contact between cars, the system does not assign fault, and all players involved in the incident incur the same number of incident points.

=== Driver rating system ===
iRacing includes an Elo-type driver skill rating system called iRating, used to split drivers into different race sessions and championship divisions for better competition. Like Safety Rating/license class, iRating is tracked separately for each of iRacing's five disciplines. iRating and Safety Rating are only impacted in iRacing.com-sanctioned official ranked races. Additionally, a minimum number of players (usually 6) must participate in the race for iRating to be affected.

== Content ==
24 cars and 32 tracks are provided in the subscription's base content. Additional vehicles and tracks are available for individual purchase, though players must maintain an active iRacing subscription to access these after purchase. Ranked races in the Rookie license class primarily utilize the content included with the base subscription. The track and vehicle catalogue in iRacing is subject to additions of new content with each season update. The iRacing catalogue consists of more than 100 cars and tracks. Cars on the service include stock cars, sprint cars, touring cars, open-wheel cars, and prototype cars.

== Development ==
iRacing began to be developed in 2004, when Dave Kaemmer, co-founder of the Papyrus Design Group, partnered with John W. Henry to create FIRST.net LLC, which then acquired the code to NASCAR Racing 2003 Season. Kaemmer then worked this source code into what would become iRacing, released four years later in 2008. iRacing retains the multi-body physics system of NR2003, as well as some of the track presentation and multi-user packet code, but everything else has been changed, or is completely new, like the tire model and graphics engine. The service receives regular updates between 12-week competition seasons.

Over a two-month period in December 2021 and January 2022, iRacing.com acquired a pair of racing game companies, Orontes Games and Monster Games; the former developed the Orontes game engine used in its 2020 off-road racing game Drag, while the latter has created multiple racing games including NASCAR Heat. The two remained independent from their new parent, though iRacing's development team absorbed assets like Orontes' lead developers Christian Folkers and Thorsten Folkers and Monster's co-founder and owner Richard Garcia.

== Partnerships ==
=== NASCAR ===
iRacing.com has been a long time partner of NASCAR. Their first partnership was announced in 2010, renewed once, and is now looking forward at a decade or more of future partnership, announced in a further renewal agreement in 2021. On November 2, 2020 NASCAR Hall of Fame member Dale Earnhardt Jr. was named as executive director at iRacing.com. NASCAR is involved in several series present on iRacing, including the premier eNASCAR Coca-Cola iRacing Series, eNASCAR College iRacing Series, and its respective, iRacing.com-sanctioned series: the NASCAR iRacing Series classes A B and C, and the eNASCAR Road to Pro Qualifying Series.

=== IMSA ===
IMSA first partnered with iRacing.com in 2020 with the debut of the IMSA iRacing Pro Series, which put professional racing drivers from IMSA and other series against each other in the iRacing simulation software. IMSA also sponsors several iRacing.com-sanctioned series designed to reflect real series that IMSA holds: the IMSA Hagerty iRacing Series, iRacing IMSA Michelin Pilot Challenge, and the IMSA iRacing Endurance Series.

=== World of Outlaws ===
World of Outlaws began partnering with iRacing.com in 2018 to provide two eSports World Championship Series, one for late models, the other for sprint cars. On April 5, 2022, along with the announcement of the extension of their partnership, WoO announced they would be developing a new World of Outlaws console game with iRacing.com and Monster Games, the first new World of Outlaws game in more than 10 years.

=== Porsche ===
German automobile manufacturer Porsche has worked together with iRacing.com since 2017, announcing the first iteration of the Porsche eSports Supercup in 2018. iRacing.com has many of Porsche's vehicles in its catalogue due to the connection between the two.

=== FOX Sports ===
In March 2020, FOX Sports aired the inaugural event of the eNASCAR iRacing Pro Invitational Series, due to real-life auto racing events being hindered due to the COVID-19 pandemic. This endeavor proved to be successful, with the broadcast on FS1 watched by almost a million viewers. FOX subsequently decided to air the rest of the series would continue to be broadcast on FS1. The series continued until 2021, when drivers returned to normal driving at real-life events.

=== Fédération Internationale de l'Automobile (FIA) ===
On May 30, 2023, iRacing announced an official partnership with the Fédération Internationale de l'Automobile (FIA). As part of the agreement, the car known as the iRacing Formula iR-04 was relaunched as the FIA F4 with iRacing’s 2023 Season 3 update release in June 2023

=== Other partnerships ===
iRacing.com has many other partnerships with other racing organizations like the USAC, and licensing deals with major automotive manufacturers like Audi and Mercedes. A full list of iRacing.com's partners can be found on their website.

== Competitions and eSports ==
=== eNASCAR ===
- eNASCAR Coca-Cola iRacing Series (2010–present)
- eNASCAR Road To Pro Series (2020–2025)
- eNASCAR International Series (2021–present)
- eNASCAR College iRacing Series (2022–present)
- eNASCAR iRacing Pro Invitational Series (2020–2021)

=== IndyCar Series ===
- IndyCar iRacing Challenge (2020)

=== iRacing Special Events ===
iRacing host several Special Events across each calendar year, including 24-hour endurance events inspired by the 24 Hours of Daytona, the Nürburgring 24 Hours and the Spa 24 Hours.

== Reception ==
Reception

Aggregate score
Aggregator	Score
Metacritic	79/100

Review scores
Publication	Score
PC Gamer (UK)	80%
GameStar	68%

iRacing was launched to the public on August 26, 2008. By July 2009 more than 16,000 individuals had subscribed to the service. The company said there were 50,000 members as of December 2013. By April of 2020, iRacing.com president and CFO Anthony Gardner claimed the service had over 160,000 active subscribers.

iRacing has received favorable reviews from automobile, racing and gaming magazines as well as websites dedicated to racing simulators. The service has also been criticized for not yet including features often found on other racing simulators, such more advanced visual damage modeling. Rain was added to the sim for Season 2 2024, while not all series and cars offer wet racing as of early 2025 the list of series that do offer rain is extensive. PC Gamer stated that the game was "not one that will be to everyone's taste", while GameStar back in 2009 concluded "The graphics give the impression of an unfinished beta, but at least the atmosphere between the players is always friendly."
