= Morgan Wallen discography =

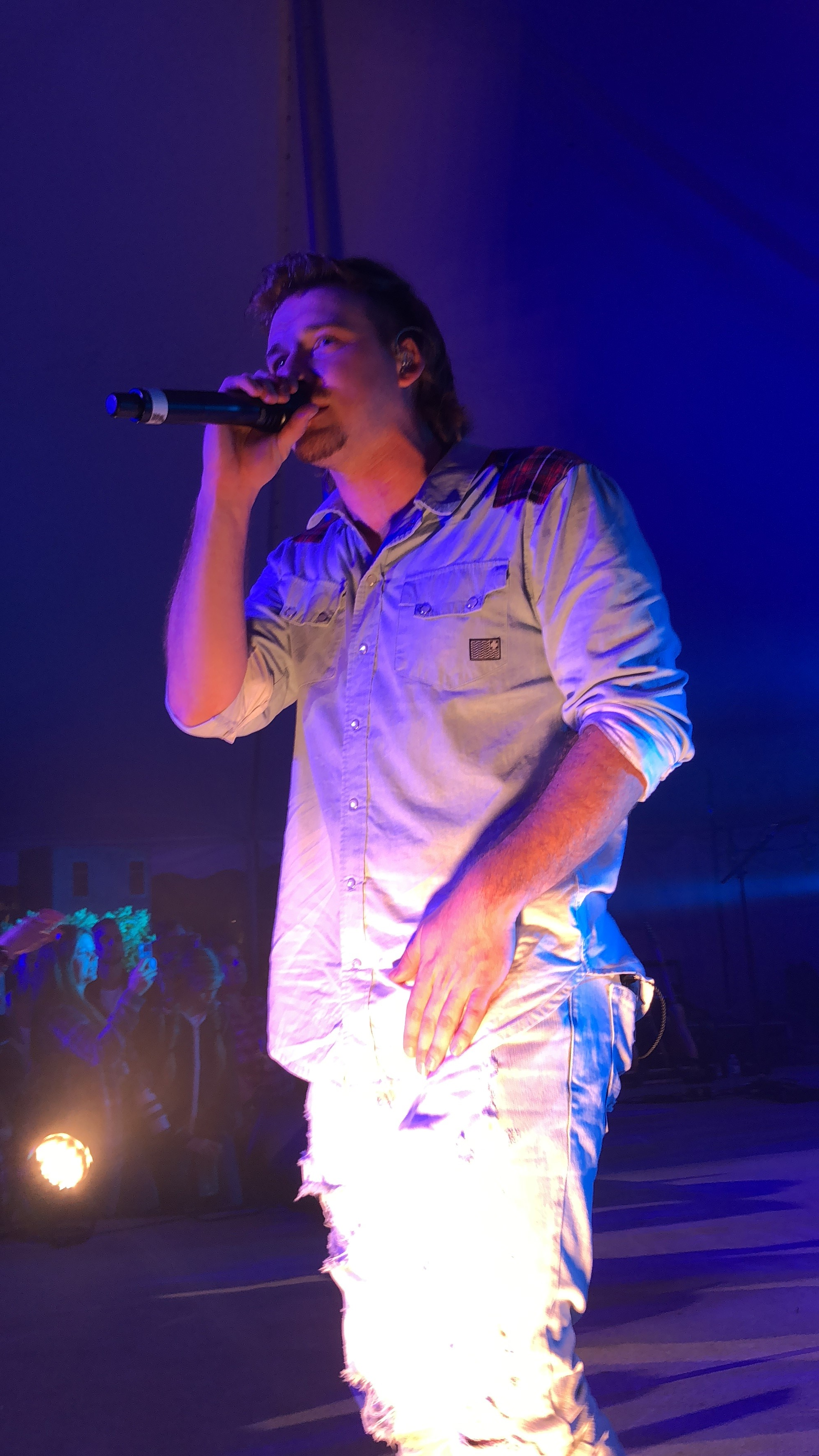
- Morgan Wallen performing in September 2018 at the Xfinity Theatre in Hartford, Connecticut.
- Studio albums: 4
- EPs: 4
- Singles: 29
- Promotional singles: 12
- Music videos: 13

American singer-songwriter Morgan Wallen has released four studio albums, four extended plays (EP), 22 singles as a lead artist, seven singles as a featured artist, 12 promotional singles, nine music videos as a lead artist, and four music videos as a featured artist. According to Recording Industry Association of America, Wallen has sold 214 million digital singles and 26 million albums in the United States. Wallen had his musical debut in 2014 when he competed on season six of the television show The Voice. The Voice raised Wallen's profile, which caused him to establish connections in the music industry. On July 29, 2016, Wallen released his second extended play The Way I Talk—which spawned his debut single, the title track. The title track became Wallen's first entries on Billboard's Country Airplay and Hot Country Songs charts, peaking at numbers 30 and number 35 respectively. On November 27, 2017, "Up Down", a collaboration with Florida Georgia Line, was released. The single served as a follow-up to Wallen's debut single and became his first US Billboard Hot 100 entry, peaking at number 49. Throughout 2019 and 2020, Wallen released four singles: "Whiskey Glasses", "Chasin' You", "More Than My Hometown", and "7 Summers". The former two songs appeared on Wallen's debut studio album If I Know Me, which was released on April 27, 2018. The latter two songs would appear on Wallen's second studio album Dangerous: The Double Album—which was released on January 8, 2021. If I Know Me peaked atop the Top Country Albums chart after 114 weeks, while Dangerous: The Double Album spent 165 non-consecutive weeks in the top ten of the US Billboard 200 between 2021 to 2025.

Wallen's third studio album, One Thing at a Time, was released on March 3, 2023, and subsequently debuted atop the US Billboard 200. The album remained atop the chart for 12 consecutive weeks, eventually spent 19 non-consecutive weeks at number one, and ultimately spent 123 weeks (and counting) in the top ten of the chart. The album spawned six top ten singles on the US Billboard Hot 100, most notably "Last Night", which became Wallen's first Hot 100 chart topper and topped the chart for 16 non-consecutive weeks, becoming one of the longest-running number-one songs on the respective chart of all time. On January 26, 2024, Panacea Records released a deluxe 10th anniversary edition of Stand Alone, Wallen's debut extended play from 2015. The 10th anniversary edition consisted of eight unreleased songs that Wallen himself deemed "terrible". Alongside the release of the extended play, an acoustic version of his song "Spin You Around" entitled "Spin You Around (1/24)" released. The song peaked atop the Country Digital Song Sales chart the following week. On May 10, 2024, Wallen was featured on Post Malone's single "I Had Some Help", which became Wallen's second Billboard Hot 100 number one. Later that year—Wallen garnered his third US Billboard Hot 100 number one with "Love Somebody". On May 16, 2025, Wallen released his fourth studio album I'm the Problem, which also debuted atop the US Billboard 200. Like its predecessor, it maintained a strong presence on the chart for multiple weeks. It spawned nine top ten hits on the US Billboard Hot 100, (Note: While I'm the Problem did spawn nine Billboard Hot 100 top ten hits, six of them charted within the top ten prior to the album's release—the record for the most top ten hits before an album released. With nine top ten hits, I'm the Problem tied Certified Lover Boy by Drake in 2021 for the album with the second most top ten hits on the chart.) including Wallen's fourth number one on the chart, "What I Want", and 13 top ten hits on the Hot Country Songs chart.

== Studio albums ==
List of studio albums, with selected details, chart positions, sales, and certifications
Title	Details	Peak chart positions									Sales	Certifications
Title	Details	US	US Country	AUS	CAN	IRE	NOR	NZ	SCO	UK	Sales	Certifications
If I Know Me	Release date: April 27, 2018; Label: Big Loud; Format: CD, LP, digital download, streaming	10	1	53	21	—	—	—	—	—		RIAA: 4× Platinum
Dangerous: The Double Album	Release date: January 8, 2021; Label: Big Loud, Republic; Format: CD, cassette, LP, digital download, streaming	1	1	2	1	33	—	14	60	77	US: 203,000; CAN: 157,000	RIAA: 9× Platinum; ARIA: Platinum; BPI: Silver; MC: 4× Platinum; RMNZ: 2× Platinum
One Thing at a Time	Released: March 3, 2023; Label: Big Loud, Republic, Mercury; Format: CD, LP, digital download, streaming	1	1	1	1	14	9	1	30	40	US: 237,000	RIAA: 9× Platinum; ARIA: 2× Platinum; BPI: Gold; MC: 4× Platinum; RMNZ: 3× Platinum
I'm the Problem	Released: May 16, 2025; Label: Big Loud, Republic, Mercury; Format: CD, LP, digital download, streaming	1	1	1	1	2	1	1	1	1	US: 237,500	RIAA: 4× Platinum; ARIA: Platinum; BPI: Silver; MC: 3× Platinum; RMNZ: Gold
"—" denotes a recording that did not chart or was not released in that territory.

== Extended plays ==
List of extended plays, with selected details, and chart positions.
Title	Details	Peak chart positions		Certifications
Title	Details	US	US Country	Certifications
Stand Alone	Release date: August 24, 2015; Label: Panacea; Format: Digital download, streaming	154	25	RIAA: Gold
The Way I Talk	Release date: July 29, 2016; Label: Big Loud; Format: Digital download, streaming	—	—	
Morgan Wallen	Release date: January 12, 2018; Label: Big Loud; Format: Digital download, streaming	—	45	
One Thing at a Time (Sampler)	Release date: December 2, 2022; Label: Big Loud, Republic, Mercury; Format: Digital download, streaming	—	—	
"—" denotes a recording that did not chart.

== Singles ==
=== As lead artist ===
List of singles as lead artist, showing year released, selected chart positions, certifications, and album.
Title	Year	Peak chart positions										Certifications	Album
Title	Year	US	US Country	US Country Airplay	AUS	CAN	CAN Country	IRE	NZ	UK	WW	Certifications	Album
"The Way I Talk"	2016	—	35	30	—	—	50	—	—	—	—	RIAA: 4× Platinum; MC: 4× Platinum; RMNZ: Gold	If I Know Me
"Up Down" (featuring Florida Georgia Line)	2017	49	5	1	—	89	1	—	—	—	—	RIAA: 5× Platinum; MC: 5× Platinum; RMNZ: Gold	If I Know Me
"Whiskey Glasses"	2018	17	1	1	—	44	1	—	—	—	194	RIAA: 13× Platinum; BPI: Gold; MC: Diamond; RMNZ: 2× Platinum	If I Know Me
"Chasin' You"	2019	16	2	1	—	44	1	—	—	—	167	RIAA: Diamond; BPI: Gold; MC: Diamond; RMNZ: 2× Platinum	If I Know Me
"More Than My Hometown"	2020	15	2	1	—	22	1	—	—	—	61	RIAA: 8× Platinum; ARIA: 2× Platinum; BPI: Silver; MC: 4× Platinum; RMNZ: Platinum	Dangerous: The Double Album
"7 Summers"	2020	6	1	15	—	8	12	—	— (Note: "7 Summers" did not enter the Official Top 40 Chart, but peaked at number 14 on the Hot Singles chart.)	—	50	RIAA: 7× Platinum; ARIA: Platinum; MC: 3× Platinum; RMNZ: Platinum	Dangerous: The Double Album
"Sand in My Boots"	2021	30	2	1	—	31	1	—	— (Note: "Sand in My Boots" did not enter the Official Top 40 Chart, but peaked at number 32 on the Hot Singles chart.)	—	47	RIAA: 5× Platinum; ARIA: Platinum; MC: 2× Platinum; RMNZ: Platinum	Dangerous: The Double Album
"Wasted on You"	2022	9	1	1	78	10	1	—	— (Note: "Wasted on You" did not enter the Official Top 40 Chart, but peaked at number 26 on the Hot Singles chart.)	—	19	RIAA: 12× Platinum; ARIA: 3× Platinum; BPI: Silver; MC: 3× Platinum; RMNZ: 2× Platinum	Dangerous: The Double Album
"You Proof"	2022	5	1	1	20	9	1	96	37	—	22	RIAA: Diamond; ARIA: 3× Platinum; BPI: Silver; MC: Diamond; RMNZ: 2× Platinum	One Thing at a Time
"Thought You Should Know"	2022	7	1	1	85	14	2	—	— (Note: "Thought You Should Know" did not enter the Official Top 40 Chart, but peaked at number 18 on the Hot Singles chart.)	—	32	RIAA: 6× Platinum; ARIA: Platinum; BPI: Silver; MC: 6× Platinum; RMNZ: Platinum	One Thing at a Time
"Last Night"	2023	1	1	1	1	1	1	7	2	28	5	RIAA: 12× Platinum; ARIA: 11× Platinum; BPI: Platinum; MC: Diamond; RMNZ: 6× Platinum	One Thing at a Time
"One Thing at a Time"	2023	10	2	8	62	16	1	—	— (Note: "One Thing at a Time" did not enter the Official Top 40 Chart, but peaked at number 19 on the Hot Singles chart.)	—	24	RIAA: 3× Platinum; ARIA: Gold; MC: 4× Platinum; RMNZ: Gold	One Thing at a Time
"Everything I Love"	2023	14	7	3	96	15	1	—	—	—	34	RIAA: 2× Platinum; ARIA: Gold; MC: 3× Platinum; RMNZ: Gold	One Thing at a Time
"Thinkin' Bout Me"	2023	7	3	1	35	13	1	61	— (Note: "One Thing at a Time" did not enter the Official Top 40 Chart, but peaked at number 7 on the Hot Singles chart.)	—	21	RIAA: 7× Platinum; ARIA: Platinum; BPI: Gold; MC: 9× Platinum; RMNZ: 3× Platinum	One Thing at a Time
"Man Made a Bar" (featuring Eric Church)	2023	15	3	1	—	20	1	—	— (Note: "Man Made a Bar" did not enter the Official Top 40 Chart, but peaked at number 8 on the Hot Singles chart.)	—	37	RIAA: 3× Platinum; ARIA: Gold; MC: 3× Platinum; RMNZ: Gold	One Thing at a Time
"Cowgirls" (featuring Ernest)	2024	12	3	1	—	21	1	79	—	92	47	RIAA: 6× Platinum; ARIA: Platinum; BPI: Gold; MC: 7× Platinum; RMNZ: 2× Platinum	One Thing at a Time
"Lies Lies Lies"	2024	7	3	1	28	10	12	48	— (Note: "Lies Lies Lies" did not enter the Official Top 40 Chart, but peaked at number 2 on the Hot Singles chart.)	58	14	RIAA: 3× Platinum; BPI: Silver; MC: 3× Platinum; RMNZ: Gold	I'm the Problem
"Love Somebody"	2024	1	1	1	26	4	1	15	22	40	8	RIAA: 3× Platinum; ARIA: Platinum; BPI: Silver; MC: 4× Platinum; RMNZ: Platinum	I'm the Problem
"I'm the Problem"	2025	2	1	1	21	3	1	43	37	44	15	RIAA: 3× Platinum; ARIA: Platinum; MC: 2× Platinum; RMNZ: Platinum	I'm the Problem
"Just in Case"	2025	2	2	1	45	4	1	77	— (Note: "Just in Case" did not enter the Official Top 40 Chart, but peaked at number 4 on the Hot Singles chart.)	75	9	RIAA: 2× Platinum; RMNZ: Gold	I'm the Problem
"What I Want" (featuring Tate McRae)	2025	1	1	55	13	2	47	23	17	30	5	RIAA: 2× Platinum; ARIA: Platinum; BPI: Silver; MC: Platinum; RMNZ: Platinum	I'm the Problem
"I Got Better"	2025	7	1	1	81	9	1	—	— (Note: "I Got Better" did not enter the Official Top 40 Chart, but peaked at number 2 on the Hot Singles chart.)	—	29	RIAA: Platinum; ARIA: Gold; RMNZ: Gold	I'm the Problem
"20 Cigarettes"	2025	15	2	1	—	33	5	—	—	—	60	RIAA: Platinum; MC: Gold	I'm the Problem
"Don't We"	2026	16	6	1	—	30	2	—	—	—	144	RIAA: Gold	I'm the Problem
"I Can't Love You Anymore" (with Ella Langley)	2026	4	3	1	48	13	1	57	— (Note: "I Can't Love You Anymore" did not enter the NZ Top 40 Singles Chart, but peaked at number 5 on the NZ Hot 40 Singles Chart.)	68	30		Dandelion
"Been By Now"	2026	2	2	1	33	2	1	79	— (Note: "Been By Now" did not enter the NZ Top 40 Singles Chart, but peaked at number 2 on the NZ Hot 40 Singles Chart.)	53	4		Non-album single
"Last Thing You Need"	2026	9	4	24	—	12	43	—	— (Note: "Last Thing You Need" did not enter the NZ Top 40 Singles Chart, but peaked at number 3 on the NZ Hot 40 Singles Chart.)	—	29		Grand Theft Auto VI: The Album
"—" denotes a recording that did not chart or was not released in that territory.

=== As featured artist ===
List of singles as featured artist, showing year released, selected chart positions, certifications, and album.
Title	Year	Peak chart positions										Certifications	Album
Title	Year	US	US Country	US Country Airplay	AUS	CAN	CAN Country	IRE	NZ	UK	WW	Certifications	Album
"Heartless" (Diplo featuring Morgan Wallen)	2019	39	10	—	99	62	—	—	— (Note: "Heartless" did not enter the Official Top 40 Chart, but peaked at number 25 on the Hot Singles chart.)	—	106	RIAA: Diamond; ARIA: 4× Platinum; MC: 4× Platinum; RMNZ: 2× Platinum	Diplo Presents Thomas Wesley, Chapter 1: Snake Oil
"Broadway Girls" (Lil Durk featuring Morgan Wallen)	2021	14	—	—	—	27	—	—	— (Note: "Broadway Girls" did not enter the Official Top 40 Chart, but peaked at number 8 on the Hot Singles chart.)	—	32	RIAA: 5× Platinum; BPI: Silver; MC: 5× Platinum; RMNZ: Platinum	7220
"Flower Shops" (Ernest featuring Morgan Wallen)	2021	64	13	18	—	62	16	—	— (Note: "Flower Shops" did not enter the Official Top 40 Chart, but peaked at number 20 on the Hot Singles chart.)	—	192	RIAA: 2× Platinum; RMNZ: Gold	Flower Shops (The Album)
"Stand by Me" (Lil Durk featuring Morgan Wallen)	2023	22	—	—	76	27	—	—	— (Note: "Stand by Me" did not enter the Official Top 40 Chart, but peaked at number 5 on the Hot Singles chart.)	—	53	RIAA: 2× Platinum; MC: Platinum	Almost Healed
"Mamaw's House" (Thomas Rhett featuring Morgan Wallen)	2023	55	14	1	—	46	1	—	— (Note: "Mamaw's House" did not enter the Official Top 40 Chart, but peaked at number 11 on the Hot Singles chart.)	—	—	RIAA: Gold	20 Number Ones
"I Had Some Help" (Post Malone featuring Morgan Wallen)	2024	1	1	1	1	1	1	1	2	2	1	RIAA: 5× Platinum; ARIA: 9× Platinum; BPI: Platinum; RMNZ: 5× Platinum	F-1 Trillion
"Whiskey Whiskey" (Moneybagg Yo featuring Morgan Wallen)	2024	21	6	—	—	49	—	—	— (Note: "Whiskey Whiskey" did not enter the Official Top 40 Chart, but peaked at number 33 on the Hot Singles chart.)	—	58	RIAA: 2× Platinum	Speak Now
"McArthur" (Hardy featuring Eric Church, Morgan Wallen and Tim McGraw)	2026	31	6	17	—	41	35	—	—	—	169		Non-album single
"—" denotes a recording that did not chart or was not released in that territory.

=== Promotional singles ===
List of promotional singles, showing year released, selected chart positions, certifications, and album.
Title	Year	Peak chart positions								Certifications	Album
Title	Year	US	US Country	US Country Airplay	AUS	CAN	IRE	NZ Hot	WW	Certifications	Album
"Cover Me Up"	2019	52	15	—	—	50	—	—	100	RIAA: 8× Platinum; ARIA: 2× Platinum; MC: 3× Platinum; RMNZ: Platinum	Dangerous: The Double Album
"This Bar"	2019	92	29	—	—	81	—	—	—	RIAA: 3× Platinum; ARIA: Platinum; MC: 2× Platinum; RMNZ: Gold	Dangerous: The Double Album
"Somebody's Problem"	2020	25	3	—	—	19	—	18	39	RIAA: 4× Platinum; ARIA: Platinum; MC: 2× Platinum; RMNZ: Gold	Dangerous: The Double Album
"Still Goin' Down"	2020	45	8	—	—	38	—	33	60	RIAA: 3× Platinum; ARIA: Gold; MC: Platinum	Dangerous: The Double Album
"Livin' the Dream"	2020	74	19	—	—	58	—	—	166	RIAA: 2× Platinum; ARIA: Gold; MC: Platinum	Dangerous: The Double Album
"Don't Think Jesus"	2022	7	1	46	—	27	—	24	14	RIAA: Platinum; MC: Platinum	One Thing at a Time
"Spin You Around (1/24)"	2024	24	5	56	—	13	93	10	67	RMNZ: Gold	Non-album promotional single
"Smile"	2024	4	2	31	36	11	52	3	19	RIAA: 2× Platinum; MC: Platinum	I'm the Problem
"I'm a Little Crazy"	2025	17	5	38	94	24	91	3	39	RIAA: Platinum	I'm the Problem
"I Ain't Comin' Back" (with Post Malone)	2025	8	3	13	56	14	49	1	20	RIAA: Platinum; MC: Platinum	I'm the Problem
"Superman"	2025	8	5	58	60	22	—	6	30	RIAA: Platinum	I'm the Problem
"Miami" (with Lil Wayne and Rick Ross)	2025	21	5	—	—	51	—	12	65	RIAA: Gold	Non-album promotional singles
"Graveyard Whistling"	2025	49	11	—	—	55	—	9	—		Non-album promotional singles
"—" denotes a recording that did not chart or was not released in that territory.

== Other charted and certified songs ==
List of other charted and certified songs, showing year released, selected chart positions, certifications and album.
Title	Year	Peak chart positions							Certifications	Album
Title	Year	US	US Country	US Country Airplay	AUS	CAN	NZ Hot	WW	Certifications	Album
"Spin You Around"	2015	—	—	—	—	—	—	—	RIAA: 3× Platinum; MC: 2× Platinum; RMNZ: Gold	Stand Alone
"Gone Girl"	2018	—	—	—	—	—	—	—	RIAA: Gold; MC: Gold	If I Know Me
"Happy Hour"	2018	—	—	—	—	—	—	—	RIAA: Gold; MC: Gold	If I Know Me
"Had Me by Halftime"	2018	—	—	—	—	—	—	—	RIAA: Gold; MC: Gold	If I Know Me
"Redneck Love Song"	2018	—	—	—	—	—	—	—	RIAA: Gold; MC: Gold	If I Know Me
"Little Rain"	2018	—	—	—	—	—	—	—	RIAA: Platinum; MC: Gold	If I Know Me
"If I Know Me"	2018	—	—	—	—	—	—	—	RIAA: 2× Platinum; MC: Platinum	If I Know Me
"Not Good at Not"	2018	—	—	—	—	—	—	—	RIAA: Platinum; MC: Platinum	If I Know Me
"Talkin' Tennessee"	2018	—	42	—	—	—	—	—	RIAA: 2× Platinum; MC: Gold	If I Know Me
"He Went to Jared" (Hardy featuring Morgan Wallen)	2019	—	—	—	—	—	—	—	RIAA: Gold	Hixtape, Vol. 1
"Turn You Down" (Hardy featuring Morgan Wallen and Zakk Wylde)	2019	—	—	—	—	—	—	—	RIAA: Gold	Hixtape, Vol. 1
"More Surprised Than Me"	2021	66	19	—	—	57	—	120	RIAA: Platinum; MC: Gold	Dangerous: The Double Album
"865"	2021	46	13	—	—	44	—	67	RIAA: 3× Platinum; ARIA: Gold; MC: Platinum	Dangerous: The Double Album
"Warning"	2021	42	10	—	—	43	—	65	RIAA: 2× Platinum; ARIA: Gold; MC: Platinum	Dangerous: The Double Album
"Neon Eyes"	2021	63	18	—	—	52	—	111	RIAA: Platinum	Dangerous: The Double Album
"Outlaw" (featuring Ben Burgess)	2021	86	29	—	—	69	—	167	RIAA: Platinum; MC: Gold	Dangerous: The Double Album
"Whiskey'd My Way"	2021	83	27	—	—	70	—	160	RIAA: Platinum	Dangerous: The Double Album
"Wonderin' 'bout the Wind"	2021	93	33	—	—	75	—	177	RIAA: Platinum; MC: Gold	Dangerous: The Double Album
"Your Bartender"	2021	84	28	—	—	68	—	161	RIAA: Platinum	Dangerous: The Double Album
"Only Thing That's Gone" (featuring Chris Stapleton)	2021	90	32	—	—	67	—	178	RIAA: Platinum; MC: Gold; RMNZ: Gold	Dangerous: The Double Album
"Rednecks, Red Letters, Red Dirt"	2021	— (Note: "Rednecks, Red Letters, Red Dirt" did not enter the Billboard Hot 100, but peaked at number five on the Bubbling Under Hot 100 chart.)	41	—	—	—	—	—	RIAA: Platinum	Dangerous: The Double Album
"Dangerous"	2021	62	17	—	—	53	—	116	RIAA: 2× Platinum; ARIA: Gold; MC: Platinum	Dangerous: The Double Album
"Beer Don't"	2021	— (Note: "Beer Don't" did not enter the Billboard Hot 100, but peaked at number three on the Bubbling Under Hot 100 chart.)	39	—	—	96	—	—	RIAA: Gold; MC: Gold	Dangerous: The Double Album
"Blame It on Me"	2021	— (Note: "Blame It on Me" did not enter the Billboard Hot 100, but peaked at number six on the Bubbling Under Hot 100 chart.)	42	—	—	98	—	—	RIAA: Gold; MC: Gold	Dangerous: The Double Album
"Somethin' Country"	2021	— (Note: "Somethin' Country" did not enter the Billboard Hot 100, but peaked at number 15 on the Bubbling Under Hot 100 chart.)	47	—	—	—	—	—	RIAA: Gold	Dangerous: The Double Album
"Country Ass Shit"	2021	— (Note: "Country Ass Shit" did not enter the Billboard Hot 100, but peaked at number nine on the Bubbling Under Hot 100 chart.)	45	—	—	—	—	—	RIAA: Platinum; MC: Gold	Dangerous: The Double Album
"Whatcha Think of Country Now"	2021	— (Note: "Whatcha Think of Country Now" did not enter the Billboard Hot 100, but peaked at number 23 on the Bubbling Under Hot 100 chart.)	48	—	—	—	—	—	RIAA: Gold	Dangerous: The Double Album
"Me on Whiskey"	2021	— (Note: "Me on Whiskey" did not enter the Billboard Hot 100, but peaked at number two on the Bubbling Under Hot 100 chart.)	38	—	—	97	—	—	RIAA: Platinum; MC: Gold	Dangerous: The Double Album
"Silverado for Sale"	2021	— (Note: "Silverado for Sale" did not enter the Billboard Hot 100, but peaked at number one on the Bubbling Under Hot 100 chart.)	34	—	—	94	—	—	RIAA: 2× Platinum; MC: Gold	Dangerous: The Double Album
"Need a Boat"	2021	—	—	—	—	—	—	—	RIAA: Gold	Dangerous: The Double Album
"Quittin' Time"	2021	— (Note: "Quittin' Time" did not enter the Billboard Hot 100, but peaked at number 13 on the Bubbling Under Hot 100 chart.)	46	—	—	—	—	—	RIAA: Platinum; MC: Gold	Dangerous: The Double Album
"Bandaid on a Bullet Hole"	2021	— (Note: "Bandaid on a Bullet Hole" did not enter the Billboard Hot 100, but peaked at number 11 on the Bubbling Under Hot 100 chart.)	30	—	—	—	—	—	RIAA: Platinum; ARIA: Gold; MC: Gold	Dangerous: The Double Album
"This Side of a Dust Cloud"	2021	—	—	—	—	—	—	—	RIAA: Gold	Dangerous: The Double Album
"Days That End in Why"	2022	57	7	—	—	50	26	120	RIAA: Platinum; MC: Platinum	One Thing at a Time
"Tennessee Fan"	2022	49	5	—	—	37	21	95	RIAA: Platinum; MC: Platinum	One Thing at a Time
"Red" (Hardy featuring Morgan Wallen)	2023	64	16	—	—	74	—	—	RIAA: Gold	The Mockingbird & the Crow
"Born with a Beer in My Hand"	2023	32	15	—	—	26	—	65	MC: Platinum	One Thing at a Time
"Devil Don't Know"	2023	29	13	—	—	28	—	61		One Thing at a Time
"'98 Braves"	2023	27	11	56	—	24	—	53	RIAA: Platinum; MC: 2× Platinum	One Thing at a Time
"Ain't That Some"	2023	11	6	—	53	10	6	23	RIAA: 3× Platinum; ARIA: Platinum; MC: 4× Platinum; RMNZ: Platinum	One Thing at a Time
"I Wrote the Book"	2023	18	9	60	97	22	35	40	RIAA: 2× Platinum; ARIA: Gold	One Thing at a Time
"Tennessee Numbers"	2023	38	18	—	—	39	—	81	MC: Platinum	One Thing at a Time
"Hope That's True"	2023	41	20	—	—	40	—	86	RIAA: Gold; MC: Platinum	One Thing at a Time
"Whiskey Friends"	2023	35	16	—	—	35	—	74	RIAA: Platinum; MC: Platinum	One Thing at a Time
"Sunrise"	2023	30	14	—	—	31	—	62	RIAA: 2× Platinum; MC: Platinum	One Thing at a Time
"Keith Whitley"	2023	44	23	—	—	50	—	97	RIAA: Gold; MC: Gold	One Thing at a Time
"In the Bible" (featuring Hardy)	2023	47	24	—	—	48	—	99	MC: Platinum	One Thing at a Time
"F150-50"	2023	53	28	—	—	49	—	116	RIAA: Gold; MC: Gold	One Thing at a Time
"Neon Star (Country Boy Lullaby)"	2023	48	25	—	—	45	—	102	RIAA: Platinum; MC: Platinum	One Thing at a Time
"I Deserve a Drink"	2023	52	27	—	—	51	—	114	RIAA: Platinum; MC: Platinum	One Thing at a Time
"Wine into Water"	2023	59	33	—	—	59	—	145	RIAA: Gold; MC: Gold	One Thing at a Time
"Me + All Your Reasons"	2023	51	26	—	—	52	—	108	RIAA: Gold; MC: Gold	One Thing at a Time
"Money on Me"	2023	72	39	—	—	71	—	195	RIAA: Gold; MC: Gold	One Thing at a Time
"Single Than She Was"	2023	56	31	—	—	53	—	122	RIAA: Gold; MC: Gold	One Thing at a Time
"Last Drive Down Main"	2023	65	36	—	—	62	—	179	MC: Platinum	One Thing at a Time
"Me to Me"	2023	71	38	—	—	67	—	184	RIAA: Gold; MC: Platinum	One Thing at a Time
"180 (Lifestyle)"	2023	63	35	—	—	57	22	169	RIAA: Platinum; MC: Platinum	One Thing at a Time
"Had It"	2023	75	41	—	—	81	—	—	RIAA: Gold; MC: Gold	One Thing at a Time
"Good Girl Gone Missin'"	2023	69	37	—	—	63	—	180	MC: Platinum	One Thing at a Time
"Outlook"	2023	76	42	—	—	78	—	—	RIAA: Gold; MC: Gold	One Thing at a Time
"Dying Man"	2023	43	22	—	—	47	—	91	RIAA: Platinum; MC: Platinum	One Thing at a Time
"Hangin' On" (with Ernest)	2024	—	37	—	—	—	38	—		Nashville, Tennessee
"Neon Moon" (with Brooks & Dunn)	2024	97	24	—	—	—	—	—		Reboot II
"Interlude"	2025	51	26	—	—	65	—	146		I'm the Problem
"Falling Apart"	2025	25	12	—	—	41	7	68	RIAA: Gold	I'm the Problem
"Skoal, Chevy, and Browning"	2025	29	13	—	—	42	—	77	RIAA: Gold	I'm the Problem
"Eyes Are Closed"	2025	22	10	—	—	37	—	64	RIAA: Gold	I'm the Problem
"Kick Myself"	2025	21	9	—	—	45	—	67	RIAA: Gold	I'm the Problem
"TN"	2025	31	13	—	—	50	—	89	RIAA: Gold	I'm the Problem
"Missing"	2025	42	20	—	—	57	—	118		I'm the Problem
"Where'd That Girl Go"	2025	32	15	—	—	49	—	94	RIAA: Gold	I'm the Problem
"Genesis"	2025	46	23	—	—	59	—	135		I'm the Problem
"Revelation"	2025	54	28	—	—	67	—	158		I'm the Problem
"Number 3 and Number 7" (with Eric Church)	2025	52	27	—	—	55	—	152		I'm the Problem
"Kiss Her in Front of You"	2025	34	16	—	—	51	—	104	RIAA: Gold	I'm the Problem
"If You Were Mine"	2025	41	19	—	—	58	—	116	RIAA: Gold	I'm the Problem
"Come Back as a Redneck" (with Hardy)	2025	63	31	—	—	69	—	200		I'm the Problem
"Dark Til Daylight"	2025	49	16	—	—	54	—	148	RIAA: Gold	I'm the Problem
"The Dealer" (with Ernest)	2025	69	35	—	—	73	—	—		I'm the Problem
"Leavin's the Least I Could Do"	2025	70	36	—	—	74	—	—		I'm the Problem
"Jack and Jill"	2025	60	30	—	—	71	—	190		I'm the Problem
"Nothin' Left"	2025	73	38	—	—	77	—	—		I'm the Problem
"Drinking Till It Does"	2025	72	37	—	—	76	—	—		I'm the Problem
"Working Man's Song"	2025	84	46	—	—	82	—	—		I'm the Problem
"Whiskey in Reverse"	2025	83	45	—	—	86	—	—		I'm the Problem
"Crazy Eyes"	2025	88	48	—	—	84	—	—		I'm the Problem
"LA Night"	2025	79	41	—	—	78	—	—		I'm the Problem
"Miami"	2025	65	33	—	—	80	—	—		I'm the Problem
"—" denotes a recording that did not chart or was not released in that territory.

== Guest appearances ==
List of non-single guest appearances, showing year released, other credited artist(s), album name, and references.
Title	Year	Other artist(s)	Album	Ref.
"He Went to Jared"	2019	Hardy	Hixtape, Vol. 1	
"Turn You Down"	2019	Hardy and Zakk Wylde	Hixtape, Vol. 1	
"Going Nowhere"	2021	Hardy and Chris Shiflett	Hixtape, Vol. 2	
"Red"	2023	Hardy	The Mockingbird & the Crow	
"John Deere Green"	2023	Hardy and Joe Diffie	Hixtape, Vol. 3: Difftape	
"Hangin' On"	2024	Ernest	Nashville, Tennessee	

== Music videos ==
=== As lead artist ===
List of music videos as lead artist with link to official YouTube music video, release date, other credited performers, directors, album, and references.
Title	Date	Other performer(s) credited	Director(s)	Album	Ref.
"The Way I Talk"	April 6, 2017	—N/a	TK McKamy	The Way I Talk and If I Know Me	
"Up Down"	October 19, 2017	Florida Georgia Line	Justin Clough	If I Know Me	
"Whiskey Glasses"	September 30, 2018	—N/a	Justin Clough	If I Know Me	
"Chasin' You"	January 4, 2019	—N/a	Jason Clough	If I Know Me	
"More Than My Hometown"	August 24, 2020	—N/a	Justin Clough	Dangerous: The Double Album	
"7 Summers"	November 13, 2020	—N/a	Justin Clough	Dangerous: The Double Album	
"You Proof"	September 9, 2022	—N/a	Justin Clough	One Thing at a Time	
"Thought You Should Know"	November 24, 2022	—N/a	Justin Clough	One Thing at a Time	
"Smile"	December 30, 2024	—N/a	Justin Clough	I'm the Problem	
"I Got Better"	October 1, 2025	—N/a	Justin Clough	I'm the Problem	
"20 Cigarettes"	October 20, 2025	—N/a	Justin Clough	I'm the Problem	

=== As featured artist ===
List of music videos as featured artist with link to official YouTube music video, release date, other credited performers, directors, album, and references.
Title	Date	Other performer(s) credited	Director(s)	Album	Ref.
"Heartless"	September 5, 2019	Diplo	Brandon Dermer	Chapter 1: Snake Oil	
"Broadway Girls"	December 20, 2021	Lil Durk	Jerry Productions and Justin Clough	7220	
"Flower Shops"	December 30, 2021	Ernest	Justin Clough	Flower Shops (The Album)	
"I Had Some Help"	May 10, 2024	Post Malone	Chris Villa and Justin Clough	F-1 Trillion	
