= 2025 in country music =

This is a list of notable events in country music that occurred in 2025.

== Events ==
- January 20 – Carrie Underwood performs "America the Beautiful" during the swearing-in ceremony at the second inauguration of Donald Trump.
- March 19 – The Grand Ole Opry celebrated its 100th birthday with a concert special hosted by Blake Shelton which featured over 50 of the Opry's living members in attendance.
- March 31 – Country singer Orville Peck makes his Broadway debut in Cabaret, playing the role of the Emcee previously played by Adam Lambert for a limited sixteen-show run at the August Wilson Theatre. Peck starred alongside Eva Noblezada as Sally Bowles.
- April 25–27 – The 2025 edition of Stagecoach Festival takes place at Empire Polo Club in Indio, California, featuring headline performances from Zach Bryan, Jelly Roll and Luke Combs. The festival also featured a special country set from Lana Del Rey, who had notably headlined Stagecoach's sister festival Coachella a year prior. Conversely, Post Malone, who performed his own special country set at Stagecoach in 2024, headlines Coachella in 2025. Shaboozey notably performs at both Coachella 2025 and Stagecoach 2025.
- April 26 – Steve Earle is invited to become the next member of the Grand Ole Opry by Vince Gill. He was inducted on September 17 by Emmylou Harris.
- May 7 – Gretchen Wilson wins season thirteen of The Masked Singer as "Pearl". Fellow country singer Brian Kelley, who appeared as "Mad Scientist Monster" came fourth. Wilson became the second country singer to win the show following LeAnn Rimes as "Sun" during season four.
- June 8 – Conner Smith is involved in a car accident during which he struck Dorothy Dobbins, a 77-year-old woman who was crossing the sidewalk, and later died at the hospital.
- July 4 – Pat Green announces that his younger brother John, his wife Julia, and their two youngest children were affected by the Central Texas floods.
- August 9 – Kathy Mattea is invited to become the next member of the Grand Ole Opry by Charlie McCoy. She was officially inducted on October 11 by Terri Clark.
- August 11 – Jim Asker resigns as the senior editor of the Billboard country, gospel, and Christian music charts after holding the position for ten years.
- August 13 – George Strait is announced as one of the recipients of the 2025 Kennedy Center Honors.
- August 17 – Miranda Lambert and Parker McCollum's Band Together Texas concert raises over $8.5 million for flood relief. Alongside Lambert and McCollum, the event featured performances from Wade Bowen, Lyle Lovett, Ronnie Dunn, Cody Johnson, Lukas Nelson, Pat Green, Jon Randall, Jack Ingram, Randy Rogers, Ryan Bingham, and Jason Aldean, and appearances by Matthew McConaughey, Dennis Quaid, Mack Brown, Emmanuel Acho, Colt McCoy, Vince Young, Roger Clemens, Chris Harrison, and Kendra Scott.
- August 21 – Connie Smith celebrates her 60th anniversary as a member of the Grand Ole Opry.
- August 26 – Chapel Hart announces their disbandment.
- September 18 – Country songwriter Brett James is killed in a plane crash in North Carolina.
- September 30 – Keith Urban and Nicole Kidman announce their divorce after 19 years of marriage.
- October 7 – Vince Gill signs a lifetime record deal with long-time label MCA Records.
- October 8 – Alan Jackson announces his final concert at Nissan Stadium, scheduled for June 27, 2026. Special guests scheduled include Luke Bryan, Eric Church, Luke Combs, Miranda Lambert, Jon Pardi, Carrie Underwood, Keith Urban, Riley Green, Cody Johnson and Lee Ann Womack.
- October 11 – Moments after her own induction, Kathy Mattea, alongside Terri Clark and Trisha Yearwood invites Suzy Bogguss to become the next member of the Grand Ole Opry. The quartet were performing Mattea's "Eighteen Wheels and a Dozen Roses" when she interrupted her own song to surprise Bogguss with the invitation. It is the first time in Opry history than an induction and invitation have occurred in the same evening.
- October 13 – Reid Perry announces his departure from The Band Perry, leaving sister Kimberly Perry as the only original member remaining.
- October 30 – Carrie Underwood becomes the highest-certified female country artist of all time.
- November 5 – CMT's "Hot 20 Countdown" hosted by Cody Alan is announced to end in December after twelve years on air. It was the final original regular music show still airing on the channel and its cancellation follows the departure of many key staff members and productions since the channel's owner, Paramount Skydance, completed their merger in August 2025.
- December 8 – Maddie & Tae announce their split after fifteen years as a duo.
- December 31 – Terri Clark is announced as a member of the Order of Canada, the country's highest civilian honour.

== Top hits of the year ==
The following songs placed within the Top 20 on the Hot Country Songs, Country Airplay, or Canada Country charts in 2025:

=== Singles released by American and Australian artists ===
Songs	Airplay	Canada	Single	Artist	References
14	2	1	"3,2,1"	Tucker Wetmore	
9	4	1	"4x4xU"	Lainey Wilson	
8	1	1	"After All the Bars Are Closed"	Thomas Rhett	
1	—	—	"All the Way"	BigXthaPlug featuring Bailey Zimmerman	
12	2	26	"Am I Okay?"	Megan Moroney	
4	1	1	"Back in the Saddle"	Luke Combs	
16	2	4	"Backseat Driver"	Kane Brown	
6	2	1	"Backup Plan"	Bailey Zimmerman featuring Luke Combs	
6	2	1	"Bar None"	Jordan Davis	
20	4	29	"Bigger Houses"	Dan + Shay	
6	1	1	"Bottle Rockets"	Scotty McCreery featuring Hootie & the Blowfish	
18	2	29	"Boys Back Home"	Dylan Marlowe featuring Dylan Scott	
42	16	41	"Coming Home"	Old Dominion	
27	2	7	"Country House"	Sam Hunt	
25	3	9	"Country Song Came On"	Luke Bryan	
16	24	36	"Cowboys Cry Too"	Kelsea Ballerini featuring Noah Kahan	
17	1	4	"Cowgirl"	Parmalee	
28	10	6	"Damn Good Day to Leave"	Riley Green	
13	1	10	"Darlin'"	Chase Matthew	
5	1	1	"Don't Mind If I Do"	Riley Green featuring Ella Langley	
10	—	—	"Eyes Are Closed"	Morgan Wallen	
14	2	39	"Fix What You Didn't Break"	Nate Smith	
25	2	50	"Forever to Me"	Cole Swindell	
30	9	19	"Friday Night Heartbreaker"	Jon Pardi	
16	2	1	"Friends Like That"	John Morgan featuring Jason Aldean	
1	60	43	"The Giver"	Chappell Roan	
3	1	1	"Good News"	Shaboozey	
19	12	6	"Good Times & Tan Lines"	Zach Top	
7	5	1	"Guy for That"	Post Malone featuring Luke Combs	
20	14	7	"Hands of Time"	Eric Church	
6	1	1	"Happen to Me"	Russell Dickerson	
12	24	60	"Hard Fought Hallelujah"	Brandon Lake featuring Jelly Roll	
14	1	2	"Heart of Stone"	Jelly Roll	
20	2	39	"Heavens to Betsy"	Jackson Dean	
8	—	—	"Hell at Night"	BigXthaPlug featuring Ella Langley	
13	10	40	"Holy Smokes"	Bailey Zimmerman	
21	1	34	"Hometown Home"	LoCash	
12	2	1	"I Ain't Sayin'"	Jordan Davis	
1	1	1	"I Got Better"	Morgan Wallen	
6	2	1	"I Never Lie"	Zach Top	
5	38	—	"I'm a Little Crazy"	Morgan Wallen	
7	3	6	"I'm Gonna Love You"	Cody Johnson and Carrie Underwood	
1	1	1	"I'm the Problem"	Morgan Wallen	
8	37	57	"Indigo"	Sam Barber featuring Avery Anna	
2	1	1	"Just in Case"	Morgan Wallen	
—	16	28	"Just to Say We Did"	Kenny Chesney	
9	—	—	"Kick Myself"	Morgan Wallen	
5	1	1	"Liar"	Jelly Roll	
1	1	1	"Love Somebody"	Morgan Wallen	
5	—	—	"Miami"	Morgan Wallen	
24	1	1	"Park"	Tyler Hubbard	
2	31	39	"Smile"	Morgan Wallen	
7	1	3	"Somewhere Over Laredo"	Lainey Wilson	
—	18	21	"Straight Line"	Keith Urban	
5	58	57	"Superman"	Morgan Wallen	
16	2	1	"Texas"	Blake Shelton	
12	12	10	"Think I'm in Love with You"	Chris Stapleton	
27	1	11	"This Heart"	Corey Kent	
17	1	39	"This Town's Been Too Good to Us"	Dylan Scott	
46	12	41	"Tough People"	Drew Baldridge	
2	42	—	"Travelin' Soldier"	Cody Johnson	
—	18	35	"Truck on Fire"	Carly Pearce	
4	2	1	"Weren't for the Wind"	Ella Langley	
1	55	47	"What I Want"	Morgan Wallen featuring Tate McRae	
15	2	44	"What Kinda Man"	Parker McCollum	
24	2	39	"Whiskey Drink"	Jason Aldean	
6	2	3	"Wind Up Missin' You"	Tucker Wetmore	
5	1	1	"Worst Way"	Riley Green	

=== Singles released by Canadian artists ===
Songs	Airplay	Canada	Single	Artist	References
–	–	7	"Another One"	Brett Kissel	
–	–	3	"Backfire"	Nate Haller and Tenille Townes	
–	–	4	"Bourbon"	Morgan Griffiths	
–	–	9	"Broken Heart Thing"	Madeline Merlo (featuring Dustin Lynch)	
–	–	12	"Coming Home to You (Bigger Houses)"	MacKenzie Porter and Owen Riegling	
–	–	4	"Cowboys & Dreamers"	Brett Kissel	
–	–	6	"CRZY"	Dallas Smith	
–	–	7	"Doin' What She Does"	Tyler Joe Miller	
–	–	11	"Happy Ever After You"	MacKenzie Porter & Jake Etheridge (Thelma & James)	
–	–	9	"Have Your Beer"	MacKenzie Porter	
–	–	6	"Highway Money"	Josh Stumpf	
–	–	4	"How Do You Miss Me"	Dallas Smith (featuring Alexandra Kay)	
–	–	4	"Leave Me Too"	Josh Ross	
–	–	13	"Life for Me"	Jess Moskaluke	
–	–	10	"Middle of the Bed"	Madeline Merlo	
–	–	5	"Never Drinking Again"	The Reklaws	
–	–	15	"Options"	Cameron Whitcomb	
–	–	8	"Quitter"	Cameron Whitcomb	
–	–	13	"Rally Around"	Sully Burrows	
22	2	2	"Single Again"	Josh Ross	
–	–	18	"Slow Go the Days"	Tim and the Glory Boys	
–	–	7	"Smoke"	Zach McPhee	
–	–	6	"Things My Mama Says"	Hailey Benedict	
–	–	17	"Til I Don't"	Sacha	
–	–	7	"What Good Is a Memory"	Tyler Joe Miller	
–	–	6	"Worth the Double"	Jade Eagleson	
–	–	3	"You Didn't Hear It From Me"	James Barker Band	

== Top new album releases ==
US	Album	Artist	Record label	Release date	Reference
4	30 Number One Hits	Jason Aldean	Broken Bow/Macon	October 10	
4	Ain't in It for My Health	Zach Top	Leo33	August 29	
4	Country! Country!	Hardy	Big Loud	September 26	
3	Different Night Same Rodeo	Bailey Zimmerman	Warner Nashville/Atlantic	August 8	
5	Evangeline vs. the Machine	Eric Church	UMG Nashville	May 2	
8	For Recreational Use Only	Blake Shelton	Wheelhouse	May 9	
4	Foxes in the Snow	Jason Isbell	Southeastern	March 7	
2	The High Road	Kane Brown	RCA Nashville	January 24	
2	I Hope You're Happy	BigXthaPlug	UnitedMasters	August 22	
1	I'm the Problem	Morgan Wallen	Big Loud	May 16	
6	Learn the Hard Way	Jordan Davis	MCA Nashville	August 15	
9	Mount Pleasant	Kelsea Ballerini	Black River	November 14	
4	Own Worst Enemy	Gavin Adcock	Thrivin' Here/Warner Nashville	August 15	
6	Parker McCollum	Parker McCollum	MCA Nashville	June 27	
2	Snipe Hunter	Tyler Childers	RCA Nashville	July 25	
10	Texas Forever	Hudson Westbrook	RiverHouse	July 25	
3	West Texas Degenerate	Treaty Oak Revival	TOR	November 28	
4	What Not To	Tucker Wetmore	UMG Nashville	April 25	

=== Other top albums ===
US	Album	Artist	Record label	Release date	Reference
29	Arcadia	Alison Krauss & Union Station	Down the Road	March 28	
29	Barbara	Old Dominion	RCA Nashville	August 22	
41	Broken Branches	Dierks Bentley	Capitol Nashville	June 13	
47	Country! (EP)	Hardy	Big Loud	May 2	
49	Easy Does It	Dylan Scott	Curb	May 30	
34	Famous Back Home	Russell Dickerson	Triple Tigers	August 22	
27	Honkytonk Hollywood	Jon Pardi	Capitol Nashville	April 11	
50	I Didn't Come Here to Leave	Chris Young	Black River	October 17	
26	Life Is a Highway: Refueled Duets	Rascal Flatts	Big Machine	June 6	
25	Lonesome Drifter	Charley Crockett	Island Records	March 14	
27	Look Up	Ringo Starr	UMG Nashville	January 10	
21	Memories and Empties	Colter Wall	La Honda/RCA	November 14	
38	The Mirror	Trisha Yearwood	MCA Nashville	July 18	
28	The Price of Admission	Turnpike Troubadours	Bossier City Records	April 11	
12	Relapse, Lies & Betrayal	Warren Zeiders	Warner Records	March 14	
36	Second Wind	Alexandra Kay	Wheelhouse	October 24	
12	The Select	Ty Myers	Capitol Nashville	January 24	
49	Snow Globe Town	Brad Paisley	Mercury Nashville	November 7	
17	Songbird	Waylon Jennings	Thirty Tigers	October 3	
48	Spanish Moss	Cole Swindell	Warner Nashville	June 27	
24	Westward	Dylan Gossett	Big Loud Texas	July 18	

== Hall of Fame inductees ==
=== Country Music Hall of Fame ===
(announced on March 25, 2025)

- Tony Brown (born 1946)
- June Carter Cash (1929–2003)
- Kenny Chesney (born 1968)

=== Canadian Country Music Hall of Fame ===
(announced on June 3, 2025)

- Lisa Brokop (born 1973)
- Joe Wood

=== International Bluegrass Music Hall of Fame ===
(announced on July 16, 2025)

- Hot Rize
- Bluegrass Cardinals
- Arnold Shultz

=== Hollywood Walk of Fame ===
Stars who were honored in 2025

- Trisha Yearwood

=== Kennedy Center Honors ===
- George Strait

== Deaths ==
- January 1 – Chad Morgan, 91, Australian country singer and guitarist
- January 4 – Eddie London, 68, American country singer ("If We Can't Do It Right")
- January 13 – Buck White, 94, American bluegrass instrumentalist, member of The Whites
- January 15 – Melba Montgomery, 86, American country singer ("No Charge")
- January 24 – Buddy Brock, 72, American songwriter ("You've Got to Stand for Something", "Watermelon Crawl")
- March 3 – Carl Dean, 82, husband of Dolly Parton
- March 6 – Troy Seals, 86, American songwriter ("Who's Gonna Fill Their Shoes", "Seven Spanish Angels")
- March 20 – Eddie Adcock, 86, American bluegrass banjo player (The Country Gentlemen)
- March 29 – Dick Damron, 91, Canadian singer and songwriter
- April 1 – Johnny Tillotson, 86, American singer-songwriter of the 1960s ("It Keeps Right On a-Hurtin'")
- April 16 – Mac Gayden, 83, American guitarist and songwriter
- April 22 – David Briggs, 82, American country keyboardist
- April 23 – Lulu Roman, 78, American comedian and singer (Hee Haw)
- May 9 – Johnny Rodriguez, 73, American country singer ("Pass Me By (If You're Only Passing Through)", "Ridin' My Thumb to Mexico")
- May 13 – Billy Earheart, 71, American country keyboardist (The Amazing Rhythm Aces, The Bama Band)
- June 19 – Gailard Sartain, 81, comedian and longtime cast member of Hee Haw
- July 18 – Helen Cornelius, 83, American country singer best known for the Jim Ed Brown duet "I Don't Want to Have to Marry You"
- July 26 – Sandy Pinkard, 78, songwriter ("Coca-Cola Cowboy") and one-half of duo Pinkard & Bowden
- July 31 – Flaco Jiménez, 86, American musician (Texas Tornados, Los Super Seven)
- August 1 – Jeannie Seely, 85, American singer ("Don't Touch Me")
- September 4 – Robby Turner, 62, American pedal steel guitarist
- September 18 – Brett James, 57, American songwriter ("Jesus, Take the Wheel", "I Hold On")
- September 19 – Sonny Curtis, 88, American musician and songwriter ("Walk Right Back", I'm No Stranger to the Rain") and member of The Crickets
- November 2 – John Wesley Ryles, 74, American singer ("Kay") and session vocalist
- November 14 – Todd Snider, 59, American singer and songwriter
- November 19 – Walt Aldridge, 70, American songwriter and record producer
- December 8 – Raul Malo, 60, American singer, songwriter and lead singer of The Mavericks
- December 15 – Joe Ely, 78, American singer-songwriter (The Flatlanders)
- December 25 – Stu Phillips, 92, Canadian-American country singer.
