= List of Billboard Hot 100 top-ten singles in 2025 =

This is a list of singles that charted in the top ten of the Billboard Hot 100, an all-genre singles chart in the United States, in 2025.

== Top-ten singles ==
Key

- ↑ – indicates single's top 10 entry was also its Hot 100 debut
- † – indicates best performing song of the year
- (#) – 2025 Year-end top 10 single position and rank
- The "weeks in top ten" column reflects each song's entire chart life, not just its run during 2025.

List of Billboard Hot 100 top ten singles that peaked in 2025
Top ten entry date	Single	Artist(s)	Peak	Peak date	Weeks in top ten	Ref.
Singles from 2024
August 31	"Die with a Smile"^{[B]}^{[P]}^{[S]} ↑† (#1)	Lady Gaga and Bruno Mars	1	January 11	51	
November 2	"APT."^{[B]}^{[H]} ↑ (#9)	Rosé and Bruno Mars	3	February 1	14	
December 7	"Luther"^{[B]}^{[O]} ↑ (#2)	Kendrick Lamar and SZA	1	March 1	32	
Singles from 2025
January 18	"Smile"	Morgan Wallen	4	January 18	1	
February 8	"4x4" ↑	Travis Scott	1	February 8	1	
February 15	"I'm the Problem"^{[I]} ↑	Morgan Wallen	2	February 15	16	
February 22	"Pink Pony Club"^{[F]}^{[N]} (#10)	Chappell Roan	4	April 26	14	
February 22	"30 for 30"	SZA with Kendrick Lamar	10	February 22	1	
March 1	"Gimme a Hug" ↑	Drake	6	March 1	1	
March 1	"Nokia"^{[G]}^{[H]}^{[M]} ↑	Drake	2	April 19	13	
March 29	"Evil J0rdan" ↑	Playboi Carti	2	March 29	1	
March 29	"Rather Lie" ↑	Playboi Carti and The Weeknd	4	March 29	1	
March 29	"The Giver" ↑	Chappell Roan	5	March 29	1	
March 29	"Anxiety"^{[K]}	Doechii	9	May 17	4	
April 5	"Just in Case"^{[L]} ↑	Morgan Wallen	2	May 31	16	
April 19	"All the Way" ↑	BigXthaPlug featuring Bailey Zimmerman	4	April 19	2	
April 19	"Ordinary"^{[U]} (#7)	Alex Warren	1	June 7	54	
May 3	"I Ain't Comin' Back" ↑	Morgan Wallen and Post Malone	8	May 3	1	
May 31	"What I Want" ↑	Morgan Wallen featuring Tate McRae	1	May 31	20	
May 31	"I Got Better"^{[T]}^{[V]} ↑	Morgan Wallen	7	May 31	7	
May 31	"Superman"	Morgan Wallen	8	May 31	1	
June 21	"Manchild"^{[P]} ↑	Sabrina Carpenter	1	June 21	9	
July 5	"Outside" ↑	Cardi B	10	July 5	1	
July 19	"What Did I Miss?" ↑	Drake	2	July 19	2	
July 19	"Golden"^{[U]}	Huntrix: Ejae, Audrey Nuna and Rei Ami	1	August 16	39	
July 26	"Daisies"^{[Q]}^{[V]} ↑	Justin Bieber	2	July 26	17	
July 26	"Love Me Not"	Ravyn Lenae	5	August 23	12	
August 9	"Your Idol"	Saja Boys: Andrew Choi, Neckwav, Danny Chung, Kevin Woo and Samuil Lee	4	August 23	10	
August 16	"The Subway" ↑	Chappell Roan	3	August 16	1	
August 23	"Soda Pop"	Saja Boys: Andrew Choi, Neckwav, Danny Chung, Kevin Woo and Samuil Lee	3	October 4	8	
August 30	"How It's Done"	Huntrix: Ejae, Audrey Nuna and Rei Ami	8	September 20	5	
September 13	"Tears" ↑	Sabrina Carpenter	3	September 13	2	
October 11	"Tit for Tat" ↑	Tate McRae	3	October 11	1	
October 18	"The Fate of Ophelia" ↑	Taylor Swift	1	October 18	24	
October 18	"Elizabeth Taylor" ↑	Taylor Swift	3	October 18	4	
October 18	"Father Figure" ↑	Taylor Swift	4	October 18	3	
October 18	"Wood" ↑	Taylor Swift	5	October 18	2	
October 18	"Wi$h Li$t" ↑	Taylor Swift	6	October 18	2	
October 18	"Actually Romantic" ↑	Taylor Swift	7	October 18	2	
October 18	"The Life of a Showgirl" ↑	Taylor Swift featuring Sabrina Carpenter	8	October 18	2	
October 18	"Eldest Daughter" ↑	Taylor Swift	9	October 18	1	
October 18	"Cancelled!" ↑	Taylor Swift	10	October 18	1	
November 1	"Mutt"	Leon Thomas	6	November 29	8	
November 15	"Thriller"^{[W]}^{[α]}	Michael Jackson	10	November 15	1	

=== 2024 peaks ===
List of Billboard Hot 100 top ten singles in 2025 that peaked in 2024
Top ten entry date	Single	Artist(s)	Peak	Peak date	Weeks in top ten	Ref.
January 20	"Lose Control"^{[B]}^{[F]}^{[H]}^{[M]}^{[R]} (#4)	Teddy Swims	1	March 30	80	
February 10	"Beautiful Things"^{[D]}^{[H]}^{[J]}^{[M]} (#6)	Benson Boone	2	March 30	42	
April 27	"Espresso"^{[B]} ↑	Sabrina Carpenter	3	June 22	33	
May 11	"A Bar Song (Tipsy)"^{[B]} (#3)	Shaboozey	1	July 13	66	
May 18	"Not Like Us"^{[E]} ↑	Kendrick Lamar	1	May 18	28	
May 25	"I Had Some Help"^{[B]} ↑ (#8)	Post Malone featuring Morgan Wallen	1	May 25	30	
June 22	"Birds of a Feather"^{[B]}^{[I]} (#5)	Billie Eilish	2	October 12	33	
September 7	"Taste"^{[B]} ↑	Sabrina Carpenter	2	September 7	14	
October 12	"Timeless"^{[D]} ↑	The Weeknd and Playboi Carti	3	October 12	2	
November 2	"Love Somebody"^{[C]}^{[L]} ↑	Morgan Wallen	1	November 2	8	
November 23	"That's So True"^{[B]}	Gracie Abrams	6	November 23	7	
December 7	"Squabble Up"^{[E]} ↑	Kendrick Lamar	1	December 7	6	
December 7	"TV Off"^{[D]} ↑	Kendrick Lamar featuring Lefty Gunplay	2	December 7	9	

=== 2026 peaks ===
List of Billboard Hot 100 top ten singles in 2025 that peaked in 2026
Top ten entry date	Single	Artist(s)	Peak	Peak date	Weeks in top ten	Ref.
January 25	"DTMF"	Bad Bunny	1	February 21	7	
January 25	"Baile Inolvidable"	Bad Bunny	2	February 21	4	
January 25	"Nuevayol"	Bad Bunny	5	February 21	2	
October 18	"Opalite" ↑	Taylor Swift	1	February 28	19	
November 1	"Man I Need"	Olivia Dean	2	January 31	43	
November 8	"Folded"	Kehlani	6	January 10	19	
November 22	"Back to Friends"	Sombr	7	January 10	9	

=== Holiday season ===
Holiday titles first making the Billboard Hot 100 top ten during the 2024–25 holiday season
Top ten entry date	Single	Artist(s)	Peak	Peak date	Weeks in top ten	Ref.
December 28, 2024	"Santa Tell Me"^{[Z]}	Ariana Grande	5	January 4, 2025	6	
December 28, 2024	"Underneath the Tree"^{[AA]}	Kelly Clarkson	7	December 27, 2025	5	

Recurring holiday titles, appearing in the Billboard Hot 100 top ten in previous holiday seasons
Top ten entry date	Single	Artist(s)	Peak	Peak date	Weeks in top ten	Ref.
December 30, 2017	"All I Want for Christmas Is You"^{[X]}	Mariah Carey	1	December 21, 2019	43	
December 29, 2018	"It's the Most Wonderful Time of the Year"^{[Z]}	Andy Williams	5	January 2, 2021	24	
January 5, 2019	"Rockin' Around the Christmas Tree"^{[Y]}	Brenda Lee	1	December 9, 2023	35	
January 5, 2019	"Jingle Bell Rock"^{[Y]}	Bobby Helms	2	December 27, 2025	32	
January 5, 2019	"A Holly Jolly Christmas"	Burl Ives	4	January 4, 2020	26	
January 2, 2021	"Let It Snow, Let It Snow, Let It Snow"^{[BB]}	Dean Martin	7	January 6, 2024	8	
January 2, 2021	"Last Christmas"^{[Y]}	Wham!	2	December 13, 2025	22	
January 7, 2023	"The Christmas Song (Merry Christmas to You)"^{[A]}^{[Z]}	Nat King Cole	6	December 27, 2025	6	

=== Notes ===
^{A} The single re-entered the top ten on the week ending January 4, 2025.
^{B} The single re-entered the top ten on the week ending January 11, 2025.
^{C} The single re-entered the top ten on the week ending February 1, 2025.
^{D} The single re-entered the top ten on the week ending February 15, 2025.
^{E} The single re-entered the top ten on the week ending February 22, 2025.
^{F} The single re-entered the top ten on the week ending March 8, 2025.
^{G} The single re-entered the top ten on the week ending March 15, 2025.
^{H} The single re-entered the top ten on the week ending April 5, 2025.
^{I} The single re-entered the top ten on the week ending April 12, 2025.
^{J} The single re-entered the top ten on the week ending April 19, 2025.
^{K} The single re-entered the top ten on the week ending May 10, 2025.
^{L} The single re-entered the top ten on the week ending May 31, 2025.
^{M} The single re-entered the top ten on the week ending June 7, 2025.
^{N} The single re-entered the top ten on the week ending July 12, 2025.
^{O} The single re-entered the top ten on the week ending August 2, 2025.
^{P} The single re-entered the top ten on the week ending September 6, 2025.
^{Q} The single re-entered the top ten on the week ending September 20, 2025.
^{R} The single re-entered the top ten on the week ending September 27, 2025.
^{S} The single re-entered the top ten on the week ending October 4, 2025.
^{T} The single re-entered the top ten on the week ending October 11, 2025.
^{U} The single re-entered the top ten on the week ending October 25, 2025.
^{V} The single re-entered the top ten on the week ending November 1, 2025.
^{W} The single re-entered the top ten on the week ending November 15, 2025.
^{X} The single re-entered the top ten on the week ending November 29, 2025.
^{Y} The single re-entered the top ten on the week ending December 6, 2025.
^{Z} The single re-entered the top ten on the week ending December 13, 2025.
^{AA} The single re-entered the top ten on the week ending December 20, 2025.
^{BB} The single re-entered the top ten on the week ending December 27, 2025.

- ^{^[α]} – "Thriller" by Michael Jackson originally made the top 10 in 1984, peaking at number 4 on March 3 that year and accumulating five weeks in the top 10. See List of Billboard Hot 100 top-ten singles in 1984 for more. The above entry for "Thriller" reflects its run in 2025 only.

== Artists with most top-ten songs ==
List of artists by total songs charting in the top-ten this year
Artist	Numbers of songs
Taylor Swift	10
Morgan Wallen	9
Kendrick Lamar	5
Sabrina Carpenter	5
Bad Bunny	3
Playboi Carti	3
Drake	3
Chappell Roan	3
Bruno Mars	2
SZA	2
The Weeknd	2
Post Malone	2
Saja Boys	2
Andrew Choi	2
Neckwav	2
Danny Chung	2
Kevin Woo	2
Samuil Lee	2
Huntrix	2
Ejae	2
Audrey Nuna	2
Rei Ami	2
Tate McRae	2

== See also ==
- 2025 in American music
- List of Billboard Hot 100 number ones of 2025
