= Come Back as a Redneck =

Song by Morgan Wallen and Hardy

from the album I'm the Problem
- Released: May 16, 2025
- Genre: Country
- Length: 3:58
- Label: Big Loud; Republic; Mercury
- Songwriters: Morgan Wallen; Michael Hardy; Ryan Vojtesak; Ernest Keith Smith; James Maddocks
- Producers: Charlie Handsome; Joey Moi

Lyric video
- "Come Back as a Redneck" on YouTube

"Come Back as a Redneck" is a song by American country music singer Morgan Wallen and country music singer Hardy, released on May 16, 2025, as the twenty-first track from Wallen's fourth studio album, I'm the Problem. This is the sixth collaboration between Wallen and Hardy, following "He Went to Jared", "Turn You Down", "Goin' Nowhere", "Red", and "In the Bible".

== Background ==
In March 2024, Wallen posted a video of a song he was working on to his social media, showcasing his MacBook Pro with mixing software, playing the song with the caption "Redneck". The original teaser had Wallen singing the first verse, which was eventually changed to Hardy in the release version. A few months after posting, Wallen deleted the post with no explanation. On March 29, 2025, Wallen was the musical guest on Saturday Night Live, and performed "I'm the Problem" and "Just in Case". During his performance, there was a television in the background that displayed several titles for unreleased songs on the album, along with their track number, including the title of "Come Back as a Redneck" with the feature blurred out. On March 31, 2025, Wallen posted another teaser, this time of the finished version, only posting his second verse with a video of him in the woods hunting.

== Lyrics and composition ==
"Come Back as a Redneck" tells the story of a man who lives in the city disapproving of the country lifestyle of someone he sees in a truck at a red light. The chorus talks from the perspective of the country boy at the light, saying that he hopes that when the city man dies, he comes back as a redneck in order to "understand the lifestyle of a redneck": "When you die I hope you come back as a redneck / I hope it sticks on you like a hell-hot sun tattoo / I hope you break your back for that barely-get-by paycheck / And when you can't you gotta go and bloody up a buck or two". The "redneck" in question wants to explain to the disapproving city man (aptly named "Mr. City Man"), that the country lifestyle is way different than in the city, and while the city man has a "rollie on his wrist" and "Nasdaq in his hand", he has no idea what the country life entails. Wallen comes in on the second verse explaining that he didn't choose how he was raised, just like the city man didn't, and that even though the city man "work in four walls" and Wallen "works with four-by-fours", they aren't as different as the city man thinks they are. Wallen rounds out the second verse with the line of "We ain't as different as you think we is / But I didn't pull up sayin' "Won't you look at that born rich, fed with a silver spoon, trust fund kid" / Like you did". Wallen explains that while he notices a difference between the two people, he didn't immediately jump to judgement like the city man did. For the rest of the song, Hardy and Wallen take turns talking about the things that the country folks do that the city man would only understand as a redneck: "Why we say grace / Why we hold hands / Keep a shotgun right by the nightstand / And why we love a good rain comin' down / And never leave these so-called backward, backwood, good-for-nothing, hillbilly hick towns".

== Charts ==
Chart performance for "Come Back as a Redneck"
Chart (2025)	Peak position
Canada Hot 100 (Billboard)	69
Global 200 (Billboard)	200
US Billboard Hot 100	63
US Hot Country Songs (Billboard)	31
