= Falling Apart =

Falling Apart may refer to:

- "Falling Apart" (Morgan Wallen song), 2025
- "Falling Apart" (Papa Roach song), 2015
- "Falling Apart", song by Broods from Don't Feed the Pop Monster, 2019
- "Falling Apart", song by Wilco from Cruel Country, 2022
- "Falling Apart", song by Zebrahead from MFZB, 2003
- Falling Apart, a television series by Anna Maloney
