= 20 Cigarettes (song) =

2025 single by Morgan Wallen

Single by Morgan Wallen

from the album I'm the Problem
- Released: October 20, 2025
- Genre: Country pop
- Length: 2:40
- Label: Big Loud; Republic; Mercury
- Songwriters: Blake Pendergrass; Chase McGill; Josh Miller; Chris LaCorte
- Producer: Joey Moi

Morgan Wallen singles chronology
"I Got Better" (2025)	"20 Cigarettes" (2025)	"McArthur" (2026)

Music video
- "20 Cigarettes" on YouTube

"20 Cigarettes" is a song by American country music singer Morgan Wallen, originally released on May 16, 2025 from his fourth studio album I'm the Problem. Written by Blake Pendergrass, Chase McGill, Josh Miller, and Chris LaCorte, and produced by Joey Moi, the track was serviced to country radio as the album's sixth single on October 20, 2025.

== Composition and lyrics ==
The song uses an electric guitar and opens with a sparser instrumental. A bass line and percussion are introduced during the second verse, before the bass is featured in an instrumental break in the bridge. The story begins with the protagonist possessing 20 cigarettes and hanging out at a bar in Demonbreun, an area of Nashville, Tennessee, on a summer evening. He catches the attention of a woman, who leaves her friends to meet him. They start talking, smoking, drinking and flirting with each other. They leave Demonbreun in the night, driving out of the city in his truck and singing "Take Me Home, Country Roads" by John Denver. They have sex in the truck bed and share their last cigarette, before the woman later disappears.

== Critical reception ==
Billboard ranked "20 Cigarettes" as the 16th best song from I'm the Problem and commented the song's story was "smartly told". Reviewing I'm the Problem for Paste, Hattie Lindert responded negatively to the song, regarding it as among the "rompier, lighter fare" that "seem slightly stale amid a slew of sour-grapes songs" and adding, "For what it's worth, even '20 Cigarettes' is both a clear and inferior rehash of the bossa-nova-inflected sound that buoyed Wallen's unexpected 2021 hit '7 Summers'".

== Charts ==
=== Weekly charts ===
Weekly chart performance for "20 Cigarettes"
Chart (2025–2026)	Peak position
Canada Hot 100 (Billboard)	33
Canada Country (Billboard)	5
Global 200 (Billboard)	60
UK Country Airplay (Radiomonitor)	1
US Billboard Hot 100	15
US Country Airplay (Billboard)	1
US Hot Country Songs (Billboard)	2

=== Year-end charts ===
Year-end chart performance for "20 Cigarettes"
Chart (2025)	Position
Canada (Canadian Hot 100)	91
US Billboard Hot 100	90
US Hot Country Songs (Billboard)	26

== Certifications ==
Certifications for "20 Cigarettes"
Region	Certification	Certified units/sales
Canada (Music Canada)	Gold	40,000^{‡}
United States (RIAA)	Platinum	1,000,000^{‡}
^{‡} Sales+streaming figures based on certification alone.

== Release history ==
Release dates and formats for "20 Cigarettes"
Region	Date	Format(s)	Label(s)	Ref.
United States	October 20, 2025	Country radio	Big Loud; Republic; Mercury	
