= Skoal, Chevy, and Browning =

Song by Morgan Wallen

from the album I'm the Problem
- Released: May 16, 2025
- Genre: Country
- Length: 3:42
- Label: Big Loud; Republic; Mercury
- Songwriters: Joe Fox; Chase McGill; Josh Miller
- Producers: Charlie Handsome; Joey Moi

Lyric video
- "Skoal, Chevy, and Browning" on YouTube

"Skoal, Chevy, and Browning" is a song by American country music singer Morgan Wallen, released on May 16, 2025, as the eighth track from his fourth studio album I'm the Problem. The song was written by Joe Fox, Chase McGill, and Josh Miller. The song was produced by Charlie Handsome and Joey Moi.

== Charts ==
=== Weekly charts ===
Chart performance for "Skoal, Chevy, and Browning"
Chart (2025)	Peak position
Canada Hot 100 (Billboard)	42
Global 200 (Billboard)	77
US Billboard Hot 100	29
US Hot Country Songs (Billboard)	13

=== Year-end charts ===
Year-end chart performance for "Skoal, Chevy, and Browning"
Chart (2025)	Position
US Hot Country Songs (Billboard)	87

== Certifications ==
Certifications for "Skoal, Chevy, and Browning"
Region	Certification	Certified units/sales
United States (RIAA)	Gold	500,000^{‡}
^{‡} Sales+streaming figures based on certification alone.
