= Dark Til Daylight =

Song by Morgan Wallen

from the album I'm the Problem
- Released: May 16, 2025
- Genre: Country
- Length: 3:55
- Label: Big Loud; Republic; Mercury
- Songwriters: Rocky Block; Chris Tompkins; Jimmy Robbins
- Producer: Joey Moi

Lyric video
- "Dark Til Daylight" on YouTube

"Dark Til Daylight" is a song by American country music singer Morgan Wallen, released on May 16, 2025, as the 23rd track from his fourth studio album I'm the Problem. The song was written by Rocky Block, Chris Tompkins, and Jimmy Robbins, while Charlie Handsome and Joey Moi produced the song.

== Lyrics and composition ==
"Dark Til Daylight" is a country song that features Wallen singing at a faster pace than usual. It has a BPM of 122, a running time of 3 minutes and 56 seconds, and is performed in the key of A minor.

The song was written by Rocky Block, Chris Tompkins, and Jimmy Robbins—while being produced by Charlie Handsome and Joey Moi.

== Commercial performance ==
"Dark Til Daylight" debuted at number 50 on the US Billboard Hot 100 dated May 31, 2025. "Dark Til Daylight" charted simultaneously alongside 36 other tracks by Wallen, 36 (including "Dark Til Daylight") entries were from I'm the Problem while the other entry was "I Had Some Help". The following week on the US Billboard Hot 100, being the June 7, 2025, dated chart—"Dark Til Daylight" rose one position to number 49.

== Charts ==
=== Weekly charts ===
Weekly chart performance for "Dark Til Daylight"
Chart (2025)	Peak position
Canada Hot 100 (Billboard)	54
Global 200 (Billboard)	148
US Billboard Hot 100	49
US Hot Country Songs (Billboard)	16

=== Year-end charts ===
Year-end chart performance for "Dark Til Daylight"
Chart (2025)	Position
US Hot Country Songs (Billboard)	53

== Certifications ==
Certifications for "Dark Til Daylight"
Region	Certification	Certified units/sales
United States (RIAA)	Gold	500,000^{‡}
^{‡} Sales+streaming figures based on certification alone.
