= McArthur (song) =

2026 single by Hardy, Eric Church, Morgan Wallen and Tim McGraw

Single by Hardy, Eric Church, Morgan Wallen and Tim McGraw
- Released: January 30, 2026
- Genre: Country
- Length: 3:51
- Label: Big Loud; Mercury
- Songwriters: Michael Hardy; Chase McGill; Jameson Rodgers; Josh Thompson
- Producers: Jay Joyce; Byron Gallimore

Hardy singles chronology
"All My Women" (2025)	"McArthur" (2026)

Eric Church singles chronology
"Hands of Time" (2024)	"McArthur" (2026)	"On the Road" (2026)

Morgan Wallen singles chronology
"20 Cigarettes" (2025)	"McArthur" (2026)	"Don't We" (2026)

Tim McGraw singles chronology
"Paper Umbrellas" (2025)	"McArthur" (2026)

Lyric video
- "McArthur" on YouTube

"McArthur" is a song by American country music singers Hardy, Eric Church, Morgan Wallen and Tim McGraw, released on January 30, 2026. It was written by Hardy, Chase McGill, Jameson Rodgers and Josh Thompson and produced by Jay Joyce and Byron Gallimore.

== Background ==
Hardy composed the song in October 2024, while spending a month at his beach house in Florida after finishing a tour. Jameson Rodgers had written a verse about a farmer named John McArthur, while Chase McGill expanded on the idea and introduced the song's concept of different generations trying to keep their land. A few days after writing the song, Hardy sent the demo to Eric Church on a whim. Church decided to collaborate with Morgan Wallen and an "OG" country singer on the song. They eventually settled on Tim McGraw for the latter. The four singers all recorded their vocals together in the studio with Jay Joyce.

== Composition ==
The song consists of percussion, drums, bass, keyboards, guitars (both acoustic and electric), mandolin and fiddle. It explores the fictional McArthur family through four generations, with each verse focusing on a patriarch, portrayed by one of the singers. The verses are performed in order by Tim McGraw, Eric Church, Hardy and Morgan Wallen, who play the roles of John, Junior, Jones and Hunter McArthur respectively. John, implied to be a Great Depression-era farmer, provided for his family with only a mule and plow; Junior was killed in the Vietnam War before he could ever meet his son; Jones desperately tried to hold on to the family ranch and teach the value of hard work to his son, only for him to be tempted by money; and in the present, Hunter is torn between honoring his family's legacy and signing a million-dollar deal to sell his farm to developers who are planning to turn it into a neighborhood. The chorus underlines the inevitability of death and importance of the legacy that one leaves behind. The singers all perform together in the final chorus.

== Commercial performance ==
According to Luminate, in the tracking week from January 30 to February 5, 2026, the song received 7.1 million official U.S. streams and 6.2 million in radio airplay audience, and sold 7,000 copies. It debuted at number 6 on Billboard's Hot Country Songs, marking the highest debut on the chart for Hardy, Church and McGraw to date.

== Charts ==
Chart performance for "McArthur"
Chart (2026)	Peak position
Canada Hot 100 (Billboard)	41
Canada Country (Billboard)	35
Global 200 (Billboard)	169
US Billboard Hot 100	31
US Country Airplay (Billboard)	17
US Hot Country Songs (Billboard)	6
