= Don't We =

2026 song by Morgan Wallen

Single by Morgan Wallen

from the album I'm the Problem
- Released: March 2, 2026
- Genre: Country
- Length: 3:11
- Label: Big Loud; Republic; Mercury
- Songwriters: Rocky Block; John Byron; Ashley Gorley; Blake Pendergrass; Morgan Wallen; Ryan Vojtesak
- Producer: Joey Moi

Morgan Wallen singles chronology
"McArthur" (2026)	"Don't We" (2026)	"I Can't Love You Anymore" (2026)

Lyric video
- "Don't We" on YouTube

"Don't We" is a song by American country music singer Morgan Wallen, originally released on May 16, 2025, from his fourth studio album I'm the Problem. Wallen co-wrote the song alongside Rocky Block, John Byron, Ashley Gorley, Blake Pendergrass, and Ryan Vojtesak, while Joey Moi served as producer. The track was serviced to country radio as the album's seventh single on March 2, 2026 and eighth single release overall.

== Composition and lyrics ==
Holler described the song as taking on "Wallen's signature blend of pop-trap infused country".

== Critical reception ==
Billboard ranked "Don't We" as the 30th best song from I'm the Problem and described it as "peppy and pride-fueled, this track is sure to [sic] a fan-favorite at Wallen's shows".

== Charts ==
Weekly chart performance for "Don't We"
Chart (2025–2026)	Peak position
Canada Hot 100 (Billboard)	30
Canada Country (Billboard)	2
Global 200 (Billboard)	144
US Billboard Hot 100	16
US Country Airplay (Billboard)	1
US Hot Country Songs (Billboard)	6

== Certifications ==
Certifications for "Don't We"
Region	Certification	Certified units/sales
United States (RIAA)	Gold	500,000^{‡}
^{‡} Sales+streaming figures based on certification alone.

== Release history ==
Release dates and formats for "Don't We"
Region	Date	Format(s)	Label(s)	Ref.
United States	March 2, 2026	Country radio	Big Loud; Republic; Mercury	
