= Smile (Morgan Wallen song) =

Promotional single by Morgan Wallen

from the album I'm the Problem
- Released: December 31, 2024
- Genre: Country
- Length: 3:44
- Label: Big Loud; Republic; Mercury
- Songwriters: Morgan Wallen; Rocky Block; John Byron; Ernest Keith Smith; Ryan Vojtesak
- Producers: Joey Moi; Charlie Handsome

Music video
- "Smile" on YouTube

"Smile" is a song by American country music singer Morgan Wallen. It was released on December 31, 2024, through Big Loud, Republic, and Mercury Records, as a promotional single from his fourth studio album I'm the Problem (2025). An accompanying music video was directed by Justin Clough.

== Background and promotion ==
After extending dates of his One Night at a Time Tour well into 2024, Wallen was first spotted in the recording studio in June 2024. On July 5 and October 18, he released two singles from an upcoming project, respectively: "Lies Lies Lies" and "Love Somebody".

The then-untitled "Smile" was first teased through an Instagram post with audio of the song on August 7, 2024. Similar to his previous single releases, no information about the song or release date were shared but based on its lyrics, the song was most commonly referred to as "Good to See You Smile". Lyrics of the snippet were interpreted as Wallen noticing his partner's unhappiness and seeing her smile for the first time in a while. The song was released without any prior announcement on New Year's Eve 2024, nearly five months later.

== Composition and lyrics ==
"Smile" continues the narrative set by the previous singles "Lies Lies Lies" and "Love Somebody", as Wallen discloses stories about "life's little moments and longings". He reflects on lighter moments of a past relationship and stresses how he loved to see his lover "smile". Co-written by American singer Ernest, whom Wallen had collaborated with on his single "Cowgirls" (2024), the "downbeat ballad" features "emotional vulnerability" alongside his distinct "storytelling prowess".

== Charts ==
=== Weekly charts ===
Weekly chart performance for "Smile"
Chart (2025)	Peak position
Australia (ARIA)	36
Australia Country Hot 50 (The Music)	31
Canada Hot 100 (Billboard)	11
Global 200 (Billboard)	19
Ireland (IRMA)	46
New Zealand Hot Singles (RMNZ)	3
Norway (VG-lista)	24
Sweden (Sverigetopplistan)	51
UK Singles (Official Charts)	52
US Billboard Hot 100	4
US Country Airplay (Billboard)	31
US Hot Country Songs (Billboard)	2

=== Year-end charts ===
Year-end chart performance for "Smile"
Chart (2025)	Position
Canada (Canadian Hot 100)	69
US Billboard Hot 100	64
US Hot Country Songs (Billboard)	13

== Certifications ==
Region	Certification	Certified units/sales
Canada (Music Canada)	Platinum	80,000^{‡}
United States (RIAA)	2× Platinum	2,000,000^{‡}
^{‡} Sales+streaming figures based on certification alone.
