= Eyes Are Closed =

2025 song by Morgan Wallen

Song by Morgan Wallen

from the album I'm the Problem
- Released: May 16, 2025
- Genre: Country
- Length: 3:17
- Label: Big Loud; Republic; Mercury
- Songwriters: Morgan Wallen; Ryan Vojtesak; Blake Pendergrass; John Byron
- Producers: Jacob Durrett; Joey Moi

Lyric video
- "Eyes Are Closed" on YouTube

"Eyes Are Closed" is a song by American country music singer Morgan Wallen from his fourth studio album I'm the Problem (2025). It was written by Wallen himself, Charlie Handsome, Blake Pendergrass and John Byron, and produced by Jacob Durrett and Joey Moi.

== Background ==
On Theo Von's This Past Weekend podcast, Morgan Wallen revealed that "Eyes Are Closed" was his first song that his son Indigo particularly liked. When Wallen came home one night and played a demo of the song that he had recorded earlier that day, Indigo heard it and immediately took interest in the song, which he asked him to play again.

== Composition ==
"Eyes Are Closed" is a midtempo song and consists of acoustic guitar, kick drums and trap beats in the production. The lyrics find Morgan Wallen brooding over with a failed relationship and wondering if his former partner shares his feelings. He admits that he still loves her, even wanting to rekindle the relationship.

== Critical reception ==
Billboard ranked "Eyes Are Closed" as the 25th best song from I'm the Problem, considering it "the album's equivalent to One Thing at a Time's 'Thinkin' Bout Me', but not quite as compelling".

== Charts ==
=== Weekly charts ===
Weekly chart performance for "Eyes Are Closed"
Chart (2025)	Peak position
Canada Hot 100 (Billboard)	37
Global 200 (Billboard)	64
US Billboard Hot 100	22
US Hot Country Songs (Billboard)	10

=== Year-end charts ===
Year-end chart performance for "Eyes Are Closed"
Chart (2025)	Position
US Hot Country Songs (Billboard)	65

== Certifications ==
Certifications for "Eyes Are Closed"
Region	Certification	Certified units/sales
United States (RIAA)	Gold	500,000^{‡}
^{‡} Sales+streaming figures based on certification alone.
