= Falling Apart (Morgan Wallen song) =

2025 song by Morgan Wallen

Song by Morgan Wallen

from the album I'm the Problem
- Released: May 16, 2025
- Genre: Country
- Length: 3:18
- Label: Big Loud; Republic; Mercury
- Songwriters: Morgan Wallen; Ryan Vojtesak; Josh Thompson; Blake Pendergrass
- Producers: Jacob Durrett; Joey Moi

Lyric video
- "Falling Apart" on YouTube

"Falling Apart" is a song by American country music singer Morgan Wallen from his fourth studio album I'm the Problem (2025). It was written by Wallen himself, Charlie Handsome, Josh Thompson and Blake Pendergrass, and produced by Jacob Durrett and Joey Moi.

== Composition ==
The song contains steel guitar and "ambient strings" in the production. Lyrically, Morgan Wallen recounts having sleepless nights and excessively drinking in an attempt to overcome his sorrow over a past relationship. He deeply regrets ending the relationship with his lover and failing to understand that she was ideal for him, now wanting to rekindle their relationship.

== Critical reception ==
Billboard ranked "Falling Apart" as the eighth best song from I'm the Problem. Alli Patton of Holler praised the production, describing it as "creating a cavernous sound that lends to the overall mood of the despondent song. The arrangement is powerful in its simplicity, with the ability to tell the song's story all on its own".

== Charts ==
=== Weekly charts ===
Weekly chart performance for "Falling Apart"
Chart (2025)	Peak position
Canada Hot 100 (Billboard)	41
Global 200 (Billboard)	68
New Zealand Hot Singles (RMNZ)	7
US Billboard Hot 100	25
US Hot Country Songs (Billboard)	12

=== Year-end charts ===
Year-end chart performance for "Falling Apart"
Chart (2025)	Position
US Hot Country Songs (Billboard)	91

== Certifications ==
Certifications for "Falling Apart"
Region	Certification	Certified units/sales
United States (RIAA)	Gold	500,000^{‡}
^{‡} Sales+streaming figures based on certification alone.
