= What I Want (Morgan Wallen song) =

Single by Morgan Wallen featuring Tate McRae

from the album I'm the Problem
- Released: May 20, 2025
- Genre: Pop; country; trap
- Length: 3:04
- Label: Big Loud; Republic; Mercury
- Songwriters: Morgan Wallen; Tate McRae; Jacob Kasher Hindlin; Ryan Vojtesak; John Byron; Joe Reeves
- Producers: Charlie Handsome; Joey Moi

Morgan Wallen singles chronology
"Just in Case" (2025)	"What I Want" (2025)	"I Got Better" (2025)

Tate McRae singles chronology
"Revolving Door" (2025)	"What I Want" (2025)	"Just Keep Watching" (2025)

Lyric video
- "What I Want" on YouTube

"What I Want" is a song by American singer Morgan Wallen featuring Canadian singer Tate McRae. It was released on May 20, 2025, through Big Loud, Mercury and Republic Records as the fifth single from Wallen's fourth studio album, I'm the Problem. The song marks the first ever collaboration between Wallen and a female singer. It debuted at number one on the US Billboard Hot 100, becoming Wallen's fourth number-one on the chart and McRae's first.

== Background ==
Wallen revealed that the collaboration with McRae was something both had wanted to do for a while. Initially, "What I Want" was not written with a female singer in mind but Wallen admitted that McRae "just absolutely crushed every single part of the song". The two did not work on or record the song in the studio together due to the fact. Wallen said that his sister introduced him to McRae's music several years prior.

After news of the collaboration broke, fans of McRae criticized her for working with Wallen following his controversial past.

== Promotion ==
On March 29, 2025, Wallen was the musical guest on Saturday Night Live, and performed previous singles "I'm the Problem" and "Just in Case". During his performance, a television in the background displayed several titles for unreleased songs on the album alongside their track numbers, including "What I Want", with other artists blurred out. In April 2025, Wallen confirmed that the song would be a collaboration with a female artist, as that is something Wallen had yet to do. On April 15, Canadian singer Tate McRae posted an Instagram story of a jersey with Tennessee Volunteers colors, having "T8" written across the front and Wallen's initials "MW". Wallen revealed the full tracklist for I'm the Problem the day after, confirming their collaboration. On May 13, the singer held a listening party at his bar in Nashville and previewed the track.

== Lyrics and composition ==
"What I Want" is a "crooning ballad" that sees both artists sharing vocals about a "temporary relationship". It tells the story of two lovers who each bring their own baggage together, realizing that they ask more of each other and, as a result, let each other "off the hook".

== Critical reception ==
In a ranking of all album tracks, Melinda Newman and Jessica Nicholson of Billboard placed the song twelfth, saying that it comes as a "shimmery tune with a slight hip-hop beat" where both artists share "verses and a few harmonies" but would have been more "fun" if the duo sang together more as their voices are a "surprisingly compatible match".

== Charts ==
=== Weekly charts ===
Weekly chart performance
Chart (2025–2026)	Peak position
Australia (ARIA)	13
Australia Country Hot 50 (The Music)	2
Bolivia Anglo Airplay (Monitor Latino)	13
Canada Hot 100 (Billboard)	2
Canada CHR/Top 40 (Billboard)	26
Canada Country (Billboard)	47
Canada Hot AC (Billboard)	22
Croatia International Airplay (Top lista)	52
Global 200 (Billboard)	5
Ireland (IRMA)	21
Lithuania Airplay (TopHit)	65
Mexico Anglo Airplay (Monitor Latino)	20
Netherlands (Dutch Top 40)	7
Netherlands (Single Top 100)	61
Netherlands Airplay (Dutch Charts)	43
New Zealand (Recorded Music NZ)	17
Norway (VG-lista)	39
Peru Anglo Airplay (Monitor Latino)	11
Portugal Airplay (AFP)	12
Sweden (Sverigetopplistan)	80
UK Singles (Official Charts)	30
US Billboard Hot 100	1
US Adult Contemporary (Billboard)	16
US Adult Pop Airplay (Billboard)	5
US Country Airplay (Billboard)	55
US Hot Country Songs (Billboard)	1
US Pop Airplay (Billboard)	6
Venezuela Anglo Airplay (Monitor Latino)	14

=== Monthly charts ===
Monthly chart performance
Chart (2025)	Peak position
Lithuania Airplay (TopHit)	97

=== Year-end charts ===
Year-end chart performance
Chart (2025)	Position
Australia (ARIA)	83
Canada (Canadian Hot 100)	25
Canada CHR/Top 40 (Billboard)	67
Canada Hot AC (Billboard)	52
Global 200 (Billboard)	113
Netherlands (Dutch Top 40)	18
US Billboard Hot 100	27
US Adult Contemporary (Billboard)	45
US Adult Pop Airplay (Billboard)	20
US Hot Country Songs (Billboard)	7
US Pop Airplay (Billboard)	24

== Certifications ==
Certifications
Region	Certification	Certified units/sales
Australia (ARIA)	Platinum	70,000^{‡}
Brazil (Pro-Música Brasil)	Platinum	40,000^{‡}
Canada (Music Canada)	Platinum	80,000^{‡}
New Zealand (RMNZ)	Platinum	30,000^{‡}
United Kingdom (BPI)	Silver	200,000^{‡}
United States (RIAA)	2× Platinum	2,000,000^{‡}
^{‡} Sales+streaming figures based on certification alone.

== Release history ==
Release dates and formats
Region	Date	Format(s)	Label(s)	Ref.
United States	May 20, 2025	Contemporary hit radio	Big Loud; Republic; Mercury	

== See also ==
- List of Billboard Hot 100 number ones of 2025
