= I'm the Problem (Morgan Wallen album) =

Studio album by Morgan Wallen
- Released: May 16, 2025
- Recorded: 2023–2025
- Studio: Morgan's farm (Nashville)
- Genres: Country; country pop; country rock
- Length: 116:46
- Labels: Big Loud; Republic; Mercury
- Producers: Charlie Handsome; Jacob Durrett; Joey Moi

Morgan Wallen chronology
One Thing at a Time (2023)	I'm the Problem (2025)

Singles from I'm the Problem
- 1. "Lies Lies Lies" Released: July 5, 2024; 2. "Love Somebody" Released: October 18, 2024; 3. "I'm the Problem" Released: January 31, 2025; 4. "Just in Case" Released: March 31, 2025; 5. "What I Want" Released: May 16, 2025; 6. "I Got Better" Released: June 23, 2025; 7. "20 Cigarettes" Released: October 20, 2025; 8. "Don't We" Released: March 2, 2026

I'm the Problem is the fourth studio album by American country music singer Morgan Wallen. It was released through Big Loud, Republic, and Mercury Records on May 16, 2025. The album features guest appearances from Tate McRae, Eric Church, Hardy, Ernest, and Post Malone. Production was handled by Joey Moi, Charlie Handsome, and Jacob Durrett. Unlike Wallen's previous album that was recorded in the Abbey Road Studios, I'm the Problem was recorded and written in his farm outside of Nashville, Tennessee.

I'm the Problem consists of 37 tracks and has a running time that is nearly 117 minutes. This became Wallen's longest running album and his album to feature the most tracks, surpassing One Thing at a Time. Additionally, I'm the Problem spawned nine singles and promotional singles: "Lies Lies Lies", "Love Somebody", "Smile", the title track, "I'm a Little Crazy", "Just in Case", "I Ain't Comin' Back", "Superman", and "What I Want". (Note: The tracks listed are listed in chronological order from which was released first to the most recent released. "Lies Lies Lies", "Love Somebody", "the title track", "Just in Case", and "What I Want" were all released as singles. "Just in Case" was first released as a promotional single but was later released as a single. "What I Want" was released as a single hours after I'm the Problem released.) (Note: "Smile", "I'm a Little Crazy", "I Ain't Comin' Back", and "Superman" were all released as promotional singles. Being listed in chronological order, "Smile" was released first, while "Superman" was most recently released.) Six of the tracks listed above debuted or reached the top-ten of the US Billboard Hot 100 before the album's release, eclipsing the conjoint record held by Taylor Swift's Red and Post Malone's Hollywood's Bleeding respectively. (Note: "Just in Case" became the fifth US Billboard Hot 100 top-ten hit from I'm the Problem before its release, eclipsing the conjoint record held by Red and Hollywood's Bleeding by Taylor Swift and Post Malone respectively. "I Ain't Comin' Back" would further extend the record to six top-ten hits before release.) "Love Somebody" and "What I Want" each debuted atop the US Billboard Hot 100, becoming Wallen's third and fourth chart-toppers on the respective chart, alongside his second and third number-one debuts.

Similarly to Wallen's previous album, I'm the Problem garnered mixed reviews from music critics. Nonetheless, the album debuted atop the US Billboard 200 and remained on the top spot for its first eight weeks and a total of 14 non-consecutive weeks, thus marking Wallen's third consecutive number-one album on the respective chart. The album moved over 493,000 album-equivalent units in its opening week, with 133,000 pure sales, overtaking the Weeknd's Hurry Up Tomorrow as the second-largest debut week of the year. It was certified 4× Platinum by RIAA in December 2025.

== Background and singles ==
On March 3, 2023, Wallen released his third studio album, One Thing at a Time. The album received mixed reviews from music critics, many considering the album too monotonous. Despite the mixed critical reception, the album debuted atop the US Billboard 200 chart, remaining there for nineteen non-consecutive weeks throughout 2023 and 2024, eventually becoming the year-end number one album of 2023. The album also holds the record for the second-most weeks spent atop the US Top Country Albums chart with 86 weeks.

To celebrate the one-year anniversary of One Thing at a Time, Wallen released the Abbey Road Sessions. The Abbey Road Sessions included an acoustic rendition of "Lies Lies Lies", the lead single from I'm the Problem—which was released on July 5, 2024. The Abbey Road Sessions additionally included a cover version of Nothing but Thieves' "Graveyard Whistling", and featured digital collections and live recordings of all 36 tracks from One Thing at a Time, namely from studio number-two. Predating the release of the album's second single, "Love Somebody" was teased by Wallen on his various social media accounts. Wallen additionally performed the song before release during his One Night at a Time Tour, which garnered positive reception. "Love Somebody" released on October 18, 2024, serving as the album's second single. Additionally, "Love Somebody" debuted atop the US Billboard Hot 100 dated November 2, 2024, becoming Wallen's third number one on the respective chart, and the 81st song to debut atop the chart in history.

On December 31, 2024, coinciding with New Year's Eve, Wallen surprise-released the promotional single "Smile". The promotional single was released alongside an official music video, becoming Wallen's eighth song to feature a music video. Exactly one month later on January 31, 2025, Wallen released the third single from the album, being the title track. The title track was first teased on Wallen's Instagram as "I Guess", and received positive reception from fans. Then on March 21, 2025, Wallen released two promotional singles: "Just in Case" and "I'm a Little Crazy". The former song caused Wallen to break the record for the most top-ten hits from an album before the album's release, with "Just in Case" debuting at number four on the US Billboard Hot 100 dated April 5, 2025. (Note: "Just in Case" became the fifth US Billboard Hot 100 top-ten hit from I'm the Problem before its release, eclipsing the conjoint record held by Red and Hollywood's Bleeding by Taylor Swift and Post Malone respectively.) Wallen released "Just in Case" as the album's fourth single on March 31, 2025.

Following the rave critical reception from Wallen's duet with Post Malone on "I Had Some Help", Wallen and Malone began to tease another collaboration. The collaboration with Post Malone, being the third promotional single from the album "I Ain't Comin' Back", released on April 18, 2025. On the US Billboard Hot 100 dated May 3, 2025, "I Ain't Comin' Back" debuted at number eight on the chart, further extending the record for the most top-ten hits from an album before release. On May 9, 2025, a week before the album's release, Wallen released the fourth promotional single from the album, being "Superman". Wallen revealed that he wanted the respective song to "have its own moment" since he wrote the song for his at-the-time three-year-old son, Indigo "Wilder" Wallen.

"I'm the Problem" debuted at number one in the United States with 493,000 units sold in its first week. The album's debut marked the largest of the year, and it broke various streaming and sales records upon its arrival. The project also reached number one in various countries around the world, including the United Kingdom, Australia, New Zealand, and Scotland, with some marking Wallen's first number one debut in the region. 36 of the 37 tracks charted on the Billboard Hot 100, and all tracks debuted on the Hot Country Songs chart.

To coincide with the album release on May 16, 2025, "What I Want", the duet with Tate McRae was released to pop radio as the album's fifth single alongside "I Got Better" and "20 Cigarettes" being serviced to country radio as the sixth and seventh singles.

== Release and promotion ==
On January 26, 2024, he revealed that he would start recording his next album towards the end of February 2024. In a statement on January 24, 2025, nearly a year later, Wallen expressed his gratitude for his fans and announced that he was still working on new music. He revealed his next album to be titled I'm the Problem. The news also included the announcement of the release of the title track on January 31, previously teased on January 13, 2024, with the caption "I guess". Wallen previewed two other tracks titled "Superman" and "I'm a Little Crazy" in February and March 2025, both set to appear on the album.

Wallen toured stadiums throughout North America to promote the album in 2025. The 19-date tour included stops in ten cities and ran from June 20 to September 13, 2025. Guests included Brooks & Dunn, Miranda Lambert, Thomas Rhett, Koe Wetzel, Gavin Adcock, Corey Kent, Ella Langley and Anne Wilson. On March 14, 2025, Wallen revealed through an Instagram post that the album was finished, and teased a track titled "Just in Case".

== Critical reception ==
Professional ratings
Aggregate scores
Source	Rating
Metacritic	64/100
Review scores
Source	Rating
AllMusic	3/5 stars
The Daily Telegraph	3/5 stars
Paste	6.0/10
Pitchfork	6.4/10
Rolling Stone	3/5 stars

According to the review aggregator Metacritic, I'm the Problem received "generally favorable reviews" based on a weighted average score of 64 out of 100 from six critic scores.

== Commercial performance ==
=== United States ===
In the United States, the album debuted at number one on the Billboard 200 chart, where it remained for its first eight weeks. After a two-week absence from the top position, it returned to number one for an additional five non-consecutive weeks, accumulating a total of 13 non-consecutive weeks atop the chart. It moved 493,000 album-equivalent units in its opening week, including 133,000 pure album sales, overtaking the Weeknd's Hurry Up Tomorrow as the largest debut week of the year. This extended Wallen's record as the country artist with the most debuts atop the Billboard 200. On the Billboard Hot 100 chart (dated May 31), 36 of the 37 tracks from the album charted, alongside his hit collaboration "I Had Some Help". This gave the country star the record for the most tracks charted simultaneously, breaking the previous record held by himself (36). Wallen also became the only artist in history to hold all tracks inside the top 10 of the Hot Country Songs chart. The project generated 462.63 million on-demand official streams in its first week, marking the largest streaming debut for a country album in 2025. It sold 286,000 units in its second week, 246,000 units in its third week, 209,000 on its fourth week, 186,000 on its fifth week, 176,000 on its sixth week and 173,000 on its seventh week. In December 2025, it was certified 4× Platinum by RIAA. In early January 2026, the album returned to number one for a 13th week. In early August, it returned to number one for a fourteenth week.

=== Worldwide ===
In the United Kingdom, I'm the Problem debuted atop the UK Albums Chart by the Official Charts Company.

== Track listing ==
I'm the Problem track listing
No.	Title	Writer(s)	Producer(s)	Length
1.	"I'm the Problem"	Morgan Wallen; Ryan Vojtesak; Ernest Keith Smith; Grady Block; Jamie McLaughlin	Charlie Handsome; Joey Moi	2:57
2.	"I Got Better"	Wallen; Vojtesak; Smith; Michael Hardy; Chase McGill; Blake Pendergrass	Moi	3:24
3.	"Superman"	Wallen; Vojtesak; Pendergrass; James Maddocks; John Byron	Jacob Durrett; Moi	3:08
4.	"What I Want" (with Tate McRae)	Wallen; Tate McRae; Jacob Kasher Hindlin; Vojtesak; Byron; Joe Reeves	Handsome; Moi	3:04
5.	"Just in Case"	Wallen; Vojtesak; Hindlin; Josh Thompson; Pendergrass; Byron; Troy Matthew; Alex Bak	Handsome; Moi	2:46
6.	"Interlude"	Wallen; Vojtesak; Pendergrass; Byron; Rocky Block	Handsome	0:44
7.	"Falling Apart"	Wallen; Vojtesak; Thompson; Pendergrass	Durrett; Moi	3:18
8.	"Skoal, Chevy, and Browning"	McGill; Josh Miller; Joe Fox	Moi	3:42
9.	"Eyes Are Closed"	Wallen; Vojtesak; Pendergrass; Byron	Durrett; Moi	3:17
10.	"Kick Myself"	Wallen; Vojtesak; Smith; Maddocks; Block	Moi	2:39
11.	"20 Cigarettes"	Pendergrass; McGill; Miller; Chris LaCorte	Moi	2:40
12.	"TN"	Wallen; Vojtesak; Ashley Gorley; Tyler Phillips; Geoff Warburton; Byron; McGill	Durrett; Moi	3:05
13.	"Missing"	Wallen; Vojtesak; Thompson; Pendergrass; McGill; Luis Witkiewitz	Handsome; Moi	3:02
14.	"Where'd That Girl Go"	Wallen; Vojtesak; Pendergrass; Byron; Block; Phillips; Warburton	Handsome; Moi	2:31
15.	"Genesis"	Wallen; Vojtesak; Pendergrass; Maddocks; Byron; Block; Jacob Durrett	Moi	3:15
16.	"Revelation"	Nicolle Galyon; Rodney Clawson; Chris Tompkins; Trannie Anderson	Durrett; Moi	3:29
17.	"Number 3 and Number 7" (with Eric Church)	Pendergrass; Block	Moi	3:15
18.	"Kiss Her in Front of You"	Vojtesak; Gorley; Byron; Phillips; Jaxson Free	Durrett; Handsome; Moi	2:58
19.	"If You Were Mine"	Tompkins; David Garcia; Jessie Jo Dillon; Warburton	Moi	2:47
20.	"Don't We"	Wallen; Vojtesak; Gorley; Pendergrass; Byron; Block	Handsome; Moi	3:11
21.	"Come Back as a Redneck" (with Hardy)	Wallen; Hardy; Vojtesak; Smith; Maddocks	Moi	3:58
22.	"Love Somebody"	Wallen; Vojtesak; Hindlin; Gorley; Nicholas Gale; Shaun Frank; Martina Sorbara; Steve Mastroianni; Yaakov Gruzman; Elof Loelv; Byron	Handsome; Moi	3:24
23.	"Dark Til Daylight"	Tompkins; Jimmy Robbins; Block	Moi	3:55
24.	"The Dealer" (with Ernest)	Pendergrass	Moi	3:03
25.	"Leavin's the Least I Could Do"	Wallen; Vojtesak; Smith; Hardy; Miller	Moi	3:07
26.	"Jack and Jill"	Ned Cameron; Jared Mullins; Jacob Hackworth; Matthew Carter	Moi	3:40
27.	"I Ain't Comin' Back" (with Post Malone)	Wallen; Austin Post; Louis Bell; Vojtesak; Smith; Hardy	Moi	2:55
28.	"Nothin' Left"	Miller; Matt Jenkins; Greylan James	Durrett; Moi	2:42
29.	"Drinking Till It Does"	Thompson; Robbins	Moi	3:10
30.	"Smile"	Wallen; Vojtesak; Smith; Byron; Block; Witkiewitz	Handsome; Moi	3:44
31.	"Working Man's Song"	Wallen; Vojtesak; Pendergrass; Block; Miller	Moi	4:16
32.	"Whiskey in Reverse"	Wallen; Vojtesak; Smith; Hardy	Moi	3:57
33.	"Crazy Eyes"	Tompkins; J. Dillon; Miller; Daniel Ross	Moi	3:18
34.	"LA Night"	Tompkins; Miller; Travis Wood	Handsome; Moi	2:49
35.	"Miami"	Wallen; Vojtesak; Smith; Hardy; Dean Dillon; Hank Cochran; Royce Porter; Pendergrass; McGill	Handsome; Moi	3:25
36.	"Lies Lies Lies"	Tompkins; J. Dillon; Miller; Ross	Moi	3:18
37.	"I'm a Little Crazy"	Hardy; Jameson Rodgers; Hunter Phelps; Smith Ahnquist	Moi	3:19
Total length:				116:46

Note

- Physical editions of the album feature two discs. Disc 1 comprises tracks 1–19, while Disc 2 contains tracks 20–37.

== Personnel ==
Credits adapted from Tidal.

=== Musicians ===
- Morgan Wallen – vocals (all tracks), background vocals (track 22)
- Tom Bukovac – electric guitar (tracks 1–5, 7–37)
- Bryan Sutton – electric guitar (tracks 1, 30), acoustic guitar (2–5, 8–29, 32–34, 36, 37), Dobro guitar (12, 26), mandolin (21, 31, 33); banjo, guitar (31)
- Wes Hightower – background vocals (tracks 1–3, 5, 7–9, 12–15, 17–21, 23–25, 27, 31, 34, 35)
- Dave Cohen – keyboards (tracks 1, 2, 4, 5, 7–11, 13–29, 31–37); accordion, organ (31)
- Jerry Roe – drums (tracks 1, 2, 4, 5, 8–15, 17–29, 31–34, 36, 37), shaker (22, 31, 33), tambourine (10, 11, 24, 28, 31, 33, 34)
- Craig Young – bass (tracks 1, 19, 24, 31)
- Jimmie Lee Sloas – bass (tracks 2, 4, 5, 7–17, 20–23, 25–30, 32–34, 36, 37)
- Charlie Handsome – electric guitar (tracks 2, 7), programming (3, 5, 6, 13, 14, 20, 22, 34, 35), piano (30)
- Jacob Durrett – programming (tracks 3, 12, 16, 28)
- Tate McRae – vocals (track 4)
- Joey Moi – electric guitar (tracks 16, 21), background vocals (23)
- David Garcia – programming (track 19)
- Hardy – vocals (track 21), background vocals (37)
- Chris Tompkins – background vocals (track 23)
- Jimmy Robbins – background vocals (track 23)
- Ernest – vocals (track 24)
- Post Malone – vocals (track 27)
- Luis "Wizzle" Witkiewitz – background vocals (track 30)

=== Technical ===
- Ted Jensen – mastering (tracks 1–35, 37)
- Justin Shturtz – mastering (tracks 22, 36)
- Joey Moi – mixing (tracks 1–5, 7–37)
- Charlie Handsome – mixing, engineering (track 6)
- Kevin Reeves – mixing (track 36)
- Josh Ditty – engineering, digital editing (tracks 1, 19, 21–24, 26, 31, 32, 34, 36)
- Ryan Yount – engineering (tracks 2, 4, 5, 7–18, 20, 25–30, 33, 35, 37); recording, engineering assistance (1, 19, 21–23, 31, 32, 34, 36); digital editing (1, 2, 4–37)
- Austin Brown – recording, engineering assistance (tracks 1, 2, 4, 5, 8–19, 21, 24–33)
- Katelyn Prieboy – recording, engineering assistance (tracks 2, 5, 8–18, 20, 22, 23, 25, 27–30, 33, 34, 36, 37)
- Steve Cordray – recording, engineering assistance (tracks 4, 26)
- Joey Stanca – recording, engineering assistance (tracks 20, 35, 37)
- Eivind Nordland – digital editing (tracks 1, 2, 4–37)
- Matthew McCartney – digital editing (tracks 1, 2, 4–37)
- Scott Cooke – digital editing (tracks 1, 2, 4–37)
- Ally Gecewicz – production coordination

== Charts ==
=== Weekly charts ===
Weekly chart performance for I'm the Problem
Chart (2025)	Peak position
Australian Albums (ARIA)	1
Australian Country Albums (ARIA)	1
Austrian Albums (Ö3 Austria)	39
Belgian Albums (Ultratop Flanders)	125
Canadian Albums (Billboard)	1
Danish Albums (Hitlisten)	6
Dutch Albums (Album Top 100)	7
French Albums (SNEP)	198
German Albums (Offizielle Top 100)	40
Irish Albums (Official Charts)	2
New Zealand Albums (RMNZ)	1
Norwegian Albums (VG-lista)	1
Portuguese Albums (AFP)	132
Scottish Albums (Official Charts)	1
Swedish Albums (Sverigetopplistan)	53
Swiss Albums (Schweizer Hitparade)	14
UK Albums (Official Charts)	1
UK Country Albums (Official Charts)	1
US Billboard 200	1
US Top Country Albums (Billboard)	1

=== Year-end charts ===
Year-end chart performance for I'm the Problem
Chart (2025)	Position
Australian Albums (ARIA)	12
Canadian Albums (Billboard)	1
Global Albums (IFPI)	2
New Zealand Albums (RMNZ)	17
UK Albums (OCC)	91
US Billboard 200	2
US Top Country Albums (Billboard)	1

== Certifications and sales ==
Certifications for I'm the Problem, with pure sales where available
Region	Certification	Certified units/sales
Australia (ARIA)	Platinum	70,000^{‡}
Canada (Music Canada)	3× Platinum	240,000^{‡}
New Zealand (RMNZ)	Platinum	15,000^{‡}
United States (RIAA)	4× Platinum	4,000,000^{‡}
^{‡} Sales+streaming figures based on certification alone.
