= Kick Myself =

2025 song by Morgan Wallen

Song by Morgan Wallen

from the album I'm the Problem
- Released: May 16, 2025
- Genre: Country
- Length: 2:39
- Label: Big Loud; Republic; Mercury
- Songwriters: Morgan Wallen; Ryan Vojtesak; Ernest Keith Smith; James Maddocks; Grady Block
- Producer: Joey Moi

Lyric video
- "Kick Myself" on YouTube

"Kick Myself" is a song by American country music singer Morgan Wallen from his fourth studio album I'm the Problem (2025). It was written by Wallen himself, Charlie Handsome, Ernest, James Maddocks and Grady Block, and produced by Jacob Durrett and Joey Moi.

== Composition ==
The song contains 808 beats and traditional country instrumentation. In the lyrics, Morgan Wallen details having quit his alcohol and drug addiction and been consulting with the doctor and God, but feeling more miserable than before despite bettering himself on the outside. He laments that he cannot escape from his true nature, regardless of his efforts.

== Critical reception ==
Billboard placed "Kick Myself" at number 21 in their ranking of the songs from I'm the Problem, writing that the song "feels confessional with a rapid-fire chorus that offers one of Wallen's best vocal deliveries". Meaghan Garvey of Pitchfork called the song "a cheesy rap-rock moment, though not without its pathos".

== Charts ==
=== Weekly charts ===
Weekly chart performance for "Kick Myself"
Chart (2025)	Peak position
Canada Hot 100 (Billboard)	45
Global 200 (Billboard)	67
US Billboard Hot 100	21
US Hot Country Songs (Billboard)	9

=== Year-end charts ===
Year-end chart performance for "Kick Myself"
Chart (2025)	Position
US Hot Country Songs (Billboard)	78

== Certifications ==
Certifications for "Kick Myself"
Region	Certification	Certified units/sales
United States (RIAA)	Gold	500,000^{‡}
^{‡} Sales+streaming figures based on certification alone.
