= I Ain't Comin' Back =

Promotional single by Morgan Wallen featuring Post Malone

from the album I'm the Problem
- Released: April 18, 2025
- Genre: Country pop
- Length: 2:55
- Label: Big Loud; Republic; Mercury
- Songwriters: Morgan Wallen; Austin Post; Louis Bell; Ryan Vojtesak; Ernest Keith Smith; Michael Hardy
- Producers: Joey Moi; Charlie Handsome

Lyric video
- "I Ain't Comin' Back" on YouTube

"I Ain't Comin' Back" is a song by American country music singer Morgan Wallen featuring American musician Post Malone. It was released on April 18, 2025, through Big Loud, Republic, and Mercury Records, as a promotional single from Wallen's fourth studio album, I'm the Problem. It marks their second collaboration within a year, following "I Had Some Help" (2024).

== Background and release ==
The duo's first collaboration "I Had Some Help" had previously spent six weeks atop the Billboard Hot 100 and earned Grammy nominations for Best Country Song and Best Country Duo/Group Performance. On January 25, 2025, Wallen announced his fourth studio album, I'm the Problem, and released four singles from the album ahead of its release up until April 2025.

On April 12, 2025, Wallen shared a short teaser clip of the song on his social media. Three days later, the artists announced their second single together. The release was revealed through an Instagram post accompanied by a picture of the two as well as the title and release date. Wallen also shared a snippet of the song in his Instagram stories where he can be heard "singing over a mid-tempo guitar line with a simple beat".

== Composition ==
The song is an "introspective and gritty track" about the aftermath of a breakup featuring "powerful lyrics" with "rebellious energy" due to namedrops of Richard Petty and Johnny Walker Black as well as the vow to never return to a former place that ruined the singer's reputation. The production includes "shimmering neon synth" and a "wallowing guitar line".

== Charts ==
=== Weekly charts ===
Weekly chart performance for "I Ain't Comin' Back"
| Chart (2025–2026) | Peak position |
|---|---|
| Australia (ARIA) | 56 |
| Canada Hot 100 (Billboard) | 14 |
| Canada Country (Billboard) | 14 |
| Global 200 (Billboard) | 20 |
| Ireland (IRMA) | 49 |
| Japan Hot Overseas (Billboard Japan) | 17 |
| Netherlands (Single Tip) | 14 |
| New Zealand Hot Singles (RMNZ) | 1 |
| Norway (VG-lista) | 36 |
| Sweden (Sverigetopplistan) | 68 |
| UK Singles (Official Charts) | 50 |
| US Billboard Hot 100 | 8 |
| US Country Airplay (Billboard) | 13 |
| US Hot Country Songs (Billboard) | 3 |

=== Year-end charts ===
Year-end chart performance for "I Ain't Comin' Back"
| Chart (2025) | Position |
|---|---|
| Canada (Canadian Hot 100) | 64 |
| US Billboard Hot 100 | 72 |
| US Hot Country Songs (Billboard) | 20 |

== Certifications ==
| Region | Certification | Certified units/sales |
|---|---|---|
| Canada (Music Canada) | Platinum | 80,000^{‡} |
| United States (RIAA) | Platinum | 1,000,000^{‡} |
^{‡} Sales+streaming figures based on certification alone.
