= I Got Better =

2025 song by Morgan Wallen

Single by Morgan Wallen

from the album I'm the Problem
- Released: June 23, 2025
- Genre: Country pop
- Length: 3:24
- Label: Big Loud; Republic; Mercury
- Songwriters: Morgan Wallen; Ryan Vojtesak; Ernest Keith Smith; Michael Hardy; Chase McGill; Blake Pendergrass
- Producer: Joey Moi

Morgan Wallen singles chronology
"What I Want" (2025)	"I Got Better" (2025)	"20 Cigarettes" (2025)

Music video
- "I Got Better" on YouTube

"I Got Better" is a song by American country music singer Morgan Wallen. It was released to country radio on June 23, 2025, as the sixth single and fifth country radio single from his fourth studio album, I'm the Problem. Wallen co-wrote the song with Ryan Vojtesak, Ernest Keith Smith, Michael Hardy, Chase McGill, and Blake Pendergrass, and it was produced by Joey Moi. Lyrically, the song is about the aftermath of a breakup.

== Background ==
Morgan Wallen revealed the origin of the song and its opening lyrics during an interview with Holler Country, stating:

At my farm, we wrote the song "I Got Better". You can see it in the first line: "Everything's still pretty much the same 'round here". One of our neighbors had just killed a piebald deer, and we're like, "Damn it, man". We had been watching this thing on camera for like two years, waiting until it was going to be a good, mature buck. That's why I followed that line with, "Neighbors still shooting all of next year's deer". I mean, if it wasn't for that farm, and for things like that, I wouldn't even know what that means, you know?

Before its release, Wallen first teased the song in December 2024.

== Composition and lyrics ==
The song finds Wallen reflecting on the aftermath of a breakup in a positive light, over an instrumental of synths and hazy guitars. Lyrically, Wallen sings about having matured since leaving the relationship, feeling like a different person; however, in the opening verse, he confesses that he still gets into drunken brawls. In the next verse, he recounts that his former partner had convinced him that his mother was "the devil", with whom he has since made peace, and hated his friends. Later, he also mentions sleeping better after the relationship ended. The song is in the key of C major with a time signature of 4/4 and is set in common time, with a tempo of 85 beats per minute.

== Critical reception ==
Billboard ranked "I Got Better" as the 23rd best song from I'm the Problem.

== Music video ==
The music video for "I Got Better" premiered on October 1, 2025.

== Charts ==
=== Weekly charts ===
Weekly chart performance for "I Got Better"
Chart (2025–2026)	Peak position
Australia (ARIA)	81
Australia Country Hot 50 (The Music)	1
Canada Hot 100 (Billboard)	9
Canada Country (Billboard)	1
Global 200 (Billboard)	29
New Zealand Hot Singles (RMNZ)	1
Peru Anglo Airplay (Monitor Latino)	13
US Billboard Hot 100	7
US Country Airplay (Billboard)	1
US Hot Country Songs (Billboard)	1

=== Year-end charts ===
Year-end chart performance for "I Got Better"
Chart (2025)	Position
Canada (Canadian Hot 100)	53
Canada Country (Billboard)	78
Global 200 (Billboard)	190
US Billboard Hot 100	40
US Country Airplay (Billboard)	47
US Hot Country Songs (Billboard)	9

== Certifications ==
Certifications for "I Got Better"
Region	Certification	Certified units/sales
Australia (ARIA)	Gold	35,000^{‡}
New Zealand (RMNZ)	Gold	15,000^{‡}
United States (RIAA)	Platinum	1,000,000^{‡}
^{‡} Sales+streaming figures based on certification alone.

== Release history ==
Release dates and formats for "I Got Better"
Region	Date	Format(s)	Label(s)	Ref.
United States	June 23, 2025	Country radio	Big Loud; Republic; Mercury	
