= I'm the Problem (song) =

Single by Morgan Wallen

from the album I'm the Problem
- Released: January 31, 2025
- Recorded: 2023–2024
- Genre: Country
- Length: 2:57
- Label: Big Loud; Republic; Mercury
- Songwriters: Morgan Wallen; Ernest Keith Smith; Ryan Vojtesak; Grady Block; Jamie McLaughlin
- Producers: Joey Moi; Charlie Handsome

Morgan Wallen singles chronology
"Love Somebody" (2024)	"I'm the Problem" (2025)	"Just in Case" (2025)

Lyric video
- "I'm the Problem" on YouTube

"I'm the Problem" is a song by American country music singer Morgan Wallen. It was released on January 31, 2025, through Big Loud, Republic, and Mercury Records, as the third single from his fourth studio album of the same title.

== Background ==
Nearly a year after the release of his third studio album, One Thing at a Time, Wallen started teasing new music in January 2024. On January 12, 2024, he shared audio of a ballad, then titled "I Guess", which would later turn out to be "I'm the Problem". The snippet revealed "dark, twisted storytelling" about Wallen being the destructive partner in a relationship combined with a "raw, demo-style production". Shortly after his post, the audio went viral on TikTok with fans dubbing it Wallen's "narcissist" song due to its lyrical content.

For the remainder of 2024, Wallen would release an acoustic set of songs titled Live from Abbey Road Studios as well as three singles to be included on his forthcoming album: "Lies Lies Lies", "Love Somebody" and "Smile". On January 24, 2025, the singer announced the title of his upcoming fourth studio album and its accompanying tour. He also announced the title track to be released on January 31, 2025. It was written by long-time collaborators Ernest, Ryan Vojtesak, Grady Block and Jamie McLaughlin with production credits from Big Loud-affiliated producers Joey Moi and Charlie Handsome.

== Charts ==
=== Weekly charts ===
Weekly chart performance for "I'm the Problem"
Chart (2025)	Peak position
Australia (ARIA)	21
Australia Country Hot 50 (The Music)	3
Bolivia Anglo Airplay (Monitor Latino)	11
Canada Hot 100 (Billboard)	3
Canada All-Format Airplay (Billboard)	7
Canada Country (Billboard)	1
Dominican Republic Anglo Airplay (Monitor Latino)	9
Dominican Republic Anglo Streaming (Monitor Latino)	12
Global 200 (Billboard)	15
Ireland (IRMA)	43
New Zealand (Recorded Music NZ)	37
Norway (VG-lista)	22
Sweden (Sverigetopplistan)	55
UK Singles (Official Charts)	44
US Billboard Hot 100	2
US Country Airplay (Billboard)	1
US Hot Country Songs (Billboard)	1

=== Year-end charts ===
Year-end chart performance for "I'm the Problem"
Chart (2025)	Position
Australia (ARIA)	66
Canada (Canadian Hot 100)	18
Canada Country (Billboard)	8
Global 200 (Billboard)	87
US Billboard Hot 100	13
US Country Airplay (Billboard)	3
US Hot Country Songs (Billboard)	3

== Certifications ==
Certifications for "I'm the Problem"
Region	Certification	Certified units/sales
Australia (ARIA)	Platinum	70,000^{‡}
New Zealand (RMNZ)	Platinum	30,000^{‡}
United Kingdom (BPI)	Silver	200,000^{‡}
United States (RIAA)	3× Platinum	3,000,000^{‡}
^{‡} Sales+streaming figures based on certification alone.
