= Lies Lies Lies =

Single by Morgan Wallen

from the album I'm the Problem
- Released: July 5, 2024
- Recorded: December 5, 2023
- Studio: Abbey Road Studios (London, England)
- Genre: Country
- Length: 3:18
- Label: Big Loud; Republic; Mercury
- Songwriters: Jessie Jo Dillon; Josh Miller; Daniel Ross; Chris Tompkins
- Producer: Joey Moi

Morgan Wallen singles chronology
"Whiskey Whiskey" (2024)	"Lies Lies Lies" (2024)	"Love Somebody" (2024)

Lyric video
- "Lies Lies Lies" on YouTube

"Lies Lies Lies" is a song by American country music singer Morgan Wallen. It was released on July 5, 2024, as the lead single from his fourth studio album I'm the Problem (2025). The song was written by Jessie Jo Dillon, Josh Miller, Daniel Ross and Chris Tompkins, and produced by Joey Moi.

== Background and composition ==
To celebrate the one-year anniversary of his third studio album, One Thing at a Time, Wallen released a digital collection titled Abbey Road Sessions featuring seven live recordings recorded at Studio Two of London's Abbey Road Studios on March 3, 2024. The set included a first full rendition of "Lies Lies Lies". He previously debuted the then untitled song during an acoustic set for iHeartRadio at the SoHo House in Nashville, Tennessee on February 21, accompanied by fellow singers Hardy and Ernest. On May 2, he performed the song for the first time live as part of his One Night at a Time tour stop in Nashville, which was then described as a "yearning ballad" by Billboard. Wallen went on to perform the song on twelve other occasions over the following weeks. During a show at Virginia Beach on June 7, he announced the song to be released as a single slated for July 4, which coincides with his BST Hyde Park festival show in London the same day.

The studio version was recorded on December 5, 2023, at Studio Two of the Abbey Road Studios in London, England. "Lies Lies Lies" observes themes of "heartbreak and deception" through "poignant" lyrics as the singer battles through a chaotic romantic relationship. Wallen pleads for reconciliation with his partner and dreads the temptation of using alcohol in the process. The song was thought to emphasize the rawness of Wallen's performances.

== Commercial performance ==
"Lies Lies Lies" debuted at number 29 on the Country Airplay chart for the week ending July 13, 2024. and peaked at number one the week ending November 23, 2024. making it Wallen's fifteenth number-one song and his fifth number one of 2024, making Wallen the first artist to achieve five number-ones in a calendar year on that chart. On December 16, 2025, it was certified 3× Platinum by RIAA.

== Charts ==
=== Weekly charts ===
Weekly chart performance for "Lies Lies Lies"
Chart (2024–2025)	Peak position
Australia (ARIA)	28
Australia Country Hot 50 (The Music)	1
Canada Hot 100 (Billboard)	10
Canada Country (Billboard)	12
Global 200 (Billboard)	14
Ireland (IRMA)	48
New Zealand Hot Singles (RMNZ)	2
Norway (VG-lista)	38
Sweden Heatseeker (Sverigetopplistan)	5
UK Singles (Official Charts)	58
UK Country Airplay (Radiomonitor)	3
US Billboard Hot 100	7
US Country Airplay (Billboard)	1
US Hot Country Songs (Billboard)	3

=== Year-end charts ===
2024 year-end chart performance for "Lies Lies Lies"
Chart (2024)	Position
Canada (Canadian Hot 100)	64
US Billboard Hot 100	50
US Country Airplay (Billboard)	60
US Hot Country Songs (Billboard)	15

2025 year-end chart performance for "Lies Lies Lies"
Chart (2025)	Position
Canada Country (Billboard)	39
US Country Airplay (Billboard)	58
US Hot Country Songs (Billboard)	27

== Certifications ==
Certifications for "Lies Lies Lies"
Region	Certification	Certified units/sales
United Kingdom (BPI)	Silver	200,000^{‡}
United States (RIAA)	3× Platinum	3,000,000^{‡}
^{‡} Sales+streaming figures based on certification alone.
