= I'm a Little Crazy =

Promotional single by Morgan Wallen

from the album I'm the Problem
- Released: March 21, 2025
- Genre: Country
- Length: 3:19
- Label: Big Loud; Republic; Mercury
- Songwriters: Michael Hardy; Smith Ahnquist; Hunter Phelps; Jameson Rodgers
- Producer: Joey Moi

Lyric video
- "I'm a Little Crazy" on YouTube

"I'm a Little Crazy" is a song by American country music singer Morgan Wallen. It was released on March 21, 2025 as a promotional single from his fourth studio album I'm the Problem. It was written by Michael Hardy, Smith Ahnquist, Hunter Phelps and Jameson Rodgers, and produced by Joey Moi.

== Background ==
In an interview with Holler Country, Morgan Wallen said that Hardy sent him the song. He went on to explain, "It's been a while ago now. I've always loved it. Just the stripped-back style of the song, you know, that's kind of how the demo was and we stuck...we stayed true to that. You know, it says what a lot of people feel, but still in a classy way, so I think that's what drew me to the song first of all, just how intelligent the lyrics were". Wallen teased the song on March 6, 2025, prior to its release.

== Composition and lyrics ==
The instrumental is composed of acoustic guitar. Lyrically, the narrator admits to engaging in quirky behaviors, such as selling Moonshine to self-medicating people and keeping a loaded gun by the bed, but emphasizes that it pales in comparison to the dreadful events happening in the world today ("I'm a little crazy, but the world's insane").

== Charts ==
=== Weekly charts ===
Weekly chart performance for "I'm a Little Crazy"
| Chart (2025) | Peak position |
|---|---|
| Australia (ARIA) | 94 |
| Canada Hot 100 (Billboard) | 24 |
| Global 200 (Billboard) | 39 |
| Ireland (IRMA) | 91 |
| New Zealand Hot Singles (RMNZ) | 3 |
| US Billboard Hot 100 | 17 |
| US Country Airplay (Billboard) | 38 |
| US Hot Country Songs (Billboard) | 5 |

=== Year-end charts ===
Year-end chart performance for "I'm a Little Crazy"
| Chart (2025) | Position |
|---|---|
| Canada (Canadian Hot 100) | 89 |
| US Hot Country Songs (Billboard) | 29 |

== Certifications ==
| Region | Certification | Certified units/sales |
|---|---|---|
| United States (RIAA) | Platinum | 1,000,000^{‡} |
^{‡} Sales+streaming figures based on certification alone.

== Dedication to Charlie Kirk ==
On September 12, 2025, during a concert in Edmonton, Wallen dedicated the song to Charlie Kirk and his widow in light of his assassination two days earlier.
