= Just in Case (Morgan Wallen song) =

2025 single by Morgan Wallen

Single by Morgan Wallen

from the album I'm the Problem
- Released: March 21, 2025
- Genre: Country pop
- Length: 2:46
- Label: Big Loud; Republic; Mercury
- Songwriters: Morgan Wallen; John Byron; Troy Matthew; Jacob Kasher Hindlin; Ryan Vojtesak; Josh Thompson; Blake Pendergrass; Alex Bak
- Producers: Joey Moi; Charlie Handsome

Morgan Wallen singles chronology
| "I'm the Problem" (2025) | "Just in Case" (2025) | "What I Want" (2025) |

Lyric video
- "Just in Case" on YouTube

"Just in Case" is a song by American country music singer Morgan Wallen. It was released on March 21, 2025, through Big Loud, Republic, and Mercury Records, as the fourth single from his fourth studio album I'm the Problem. It was written by Wallen, John Byron, Troy Matthew, Jacob Kasher Hindlin, Ryan Vojtesak, Josh Thompson, Blake Pendergrass and Alex Bak, and produced by Joey Moi, Charlie Handsome.

== Background ==
Wallen teased of the new song on his social media accounts on March 14, 2025. On March 20, 2025, Wallen announced I'm the Problem would be released on May 16, 2025, and the next day Wallen released "Just in Case" and "I'm a Little Crazy" as promotional singles. A week later, it was announced that "Just in Case" was going for immediate adds at country radio on March 31, 2025, as the fourth official single from the album. Several country outlets discussed the lyrical theme of "Just in Case" upon its release. Taste of Country noted that the song offers a different spin on heartbreak, focusing on a narrator who keeps a former partner in the back of his mind while trying to move on. Troy Matthew the creator of the song agrees. Similarly, country station 97.3 the Dawg highlighted how the lyrics balance "wishful thinking" with emotional distance as the narrator keeps hoping an ex will return.

== Content ==
"Just in Case" is a contemplative ballad song.

== Charts ==
=== Weekly charts ===
Weekly chart performance for "Just in Case"
| Chart (2025) | Peak position |
|---|---|
| Australia (ARIA) | 45 |
| Australia Country Hot 50 (The Music) | 37 |
| Bolivia Anglo Airplay (Monitor Latino) | 15 |
| Canada Hot 100 (Billboard) | 4 |
| Canada Country (Billboard) | 1 |
| Colombia Anglo Airplay (Monitor Latino) | 16 |
| Colombia Anglo Streaming (Monitor Latino) | 15 |
| Global 200 (Billboard) | 9 |
| Ireland (IRMA) | 77 |
| New Zealand Hot Singles (RMNZ) | 4 |
| UK Singles (Official Charts) | 75 |
| US Billboard Hot 100 | 2 |
| US Country Airplay (Billboard) | 1 |
| US Hot Country Songs (Billboard) | 2 |

=== Year-end charts ===
Year-end chart performance for "Just in Case"
| Chart (2025) | Position |
|---|---|
| Canada (Canadian Hot 100) | 26 |
| Canada Country (Billboard) | 11 |
| Global 200 (Billboard) | 111 |
| US Billboard Hot 100 | 18 |
| US Country Airplay (Billboard) | 8 |
| US Hot Country Songs (Billboard) | 5 |

== Certifications ==
Certifications for "Just in Case"
| Region | Certification | Certified units/sales |
|---|---|---|
| New Zealand (RMNZ) | Gold | 15,000^{‡} |
| United States (RIAA) | 2× Platinum | 2,000,000^{‡} |
^{‡} Sales+streaming figures based on certification alone.
