= Superman (Morgan Wallen song) =

Promotional single by Morgan Wallen

from the album I'm the Problem
- Released: May 9, 2025
- Genre: Country
- Length: 3:08
- Label: Big Loud; Republic; Mercury
- Songwriters: Morgan Wallen; Blake Pendergrass; Ryan Vojtesak; James Maddocks; John Byron
- Producers: Charlie Handsome; Joey Moi

Lyric video
- "Superman" on YouTube

"Superman" is a song by American country music singer Morgan Wallen, released on May 9, 2025, as a promotional single from his fourth studio album I'm the Problem. The song is the third track off the album, and was written by Wallen, Blake Pendergrass, Ryan Vojtesak, James Maddocks, and John Byron.

== Background ==
Wallen teased the song on his social media in February 2025, with the caption:

Been trying for a long time to write a song I loved to my son. None of them ever feel good enough because of how perfect I want something like this to be. And not saying this is perfect, but I am very proud of it. Here is a clip, It's called "Superman"

Wallen also stated that he teared up the first time he heard the full song, as it meant a lot to him due to it being about his son, Indigo. The snippet shared to social media contained only the first verse and the chorus, however it received a very positive reaction from his fans. On May 5, 2025, Wallen announced via his Instagram story that "Superman" would release on May 9, one week before the album release. Wallen explained that he wanted "Superman" to have "its own moment" due to how special it was to him.

== Lyrics and composition ==
"Superman" is written about Wallen's son, Indigo. The first verse talks about how one day when Indigo gets older, he will learn about Wallen's public image, with the lines, "One day you're gonna see my mugshot / From a night when I got a little too drunk / Hear a song about a girl that I lost / From the times when I just wouldn't grow up". The verse also goes into how Wallen is worried about what his son will think about him, due to his past controversy, "And when you ain't a kid no more / I hope you don't think less of me / I try to hide my falling short / But you're gonna see". The chorus tells Wallen's side of his struggles, saying that alcohol is his "kryptonite" and that he doesn't always "know his wrongs from right". He wraps up the chorus with saying that while he will not always "save the day", he will always try everything he can for Indigo, saying "Superman is still just a man sometimes".

== Charts ==
=== Weekly charts ===
Weekly chart performance for "Superman"
| Chart (2025) | Peak position |
|---|---|
| Australia (ARIA) | 60 |
| Canada Hot 100 (Billboard) | 22 |
| Canada Country (Billboard) | 57 |
| Global 200 (Billboard) | 30 |
| New Zealand Hot Singles (RMNZ) | 6 |
| US Billboard Hot 100 | 8 |
| US Country Airplay (Billboard) | 58 |
| US Hot Country Songs (Billboard) | 5 |

=== Year-end charts ===
Year-end chart performance for "Superman"
| Chart (2025) | Position |
|---|---|
| US Billboard Hot 100 | 99 |
| US Hot Country Songs (Billboard) | 28 |

== Certifications ==
| Region | Certification | Certified units/sales |
|---|---|---|
| United States (RIAA) | Platinum | 1,000,000^{‡} |
^{‡} Sales+streaming figures based on certification alone.
