= Love Somebody (Morgan Wallen song) =

Single by Morgan Wallen

from the album I'm the Problem
- Released: October 18, 2024
- Genre: Country; soft rock; dance-pop; synth-pop
- Length: 3:24
- Label: Big Loud; Republic; Mercury
- Songwriters: Morgan Wallen; John Byron; Jacob Kasher Hindlin; Ryan Vojtesak; Ashley Gorley; Elof Loelv; Martina Sorbara; Nicholas Gale; Shaun Frank; Steve Mastroianni; Yaakov Gruzman
- Producers: Joey Moi; Charlie Handsome

Morgan Wallen singles chronology
| "Lies Lies Lies" (2024) | "Love Somebody" (2024) | "I'm the Problem" (2025) |

Lyric video
- "Love Somebody" on YouTube

"Love Somebody" is a song by American country music singer Morgan Wallen. It was released on October 18, 2024, through Big Loud, Republic, and Mercury Records, as the second single from his fourth studio album I'm the Problem (2025), and follows the lead single "Lies Lies Lies". The song has charted at number one in the United States as well as within the top five in Canada and Norway and the top 20 in Ireland and Sweden.

== Background, promotion and composition ==
Wallen shared a first teaser of the song on May 16, 2024, featuring himself on a boat in Nashville, Tennessee captioned "I feel like this one's gonna sound good on the boat". While touring in Sweden in late August 2024, Wallen performed the full song for the first time during his tour stop in Stockholm as part of his One Night at a Time Tour. Another live performance includes a set with Hardy and Ernest at the T.J. Martell Foundation gala on September 17.

On September 16, he shared another snippet of the "mid-tempo" song about the theme of "looking for love", which was described as hopeful with an "ounce of pain", evoking feelings of "betrayal and heartbreak". Wallen also announced the song to be out "soon". During his homecoming show at Neyland Stadium in Knoxville, Tennessee on September 20, Wallen announced the song to be released on October 18. The artwork was revealed on October 7 and depicts a blurry shot of a beach at sunset. "Love Somebody" explores the longing for genuine connection and the struggles of finding meaningful love amidst superficial relationships. It is a country song with soft-rock elements inspired by Latin-leaning influences. The song interpolates the 2018 single "Tokyo Nights" by Digital Farm Animals, Shaun Frank and Dragonette.

== Chart performance ==
In the United States, "Love Somebody" debuted at number one on the Billboard Hot 100, becoming Wallen's first solo single to debut at the top of the chart and third to lead the chart. The song also debuted at number one on the Hot Country Songs chart, as well as the Streaming Songs and Digital Song Sales charts. "Love Somebody" entered Billboard's Pop Airplay chart during the chart week of November 9 at number 40. The song moved up to number 36 the following week. It ultimately reached the top 20 of the chart. On December 16, 2025, it was certified 3× Platinum by RIAA.

== Charts ==
=== Weekly charts ===
Weekly chart performance for "Love Somebody"
| Chart (2024–2025) | Peak position |
|---|---|
| Australia (ARIA) | 26 |
| Australia Country Hot 50 (The Music) | 1 |
| Canada Hot 100 (Billboard) | 4 |
| Canada All-Format Airplay (Billboard) | 1 |
| Canada AC (Billboard) | 24 |
| Canada Top 40 (Mediabase) | 39 |
| Canada Hot AC (Billboard) | 32 |
| Canada Country (Billboard) | 1 |
| CIS Airplay (TopHit) | 112 |
| Colombia Anglo Airplay (Monitor Latino) | 6 |
| Croatia International Airplay (Top lista) | 10 |
| Czech Republic Airplay (ČNS IFPI) | 9 |
| Global 200 (Billboard) | 8 |
| Iceland (Tónlistinn) | 35 |
| Ireland (IRMA) | 15 |
| Lebanon (Lebanese Top 20) | 5 |
| Lithuania Airplay (TopHit) | 56 |
| Netherlands (Dutch Top 40) | 6 |
| Netherlands (Single Top 100) | 37 |
| New Zealand (Recorded Music NZ) | 22 |
| Nigeria (TurnTable Top 100) | 98 |
| Norway (VG-lista) | 3 |
| Romania Airplay (TopHit) | 65 |
| South Korea BGM (Circle) | 160 |
| Suriname (Nationale Top 40) | 7 |
| Sweden (Sverigetopplistan) | 18 |
| Ukraine Airplay (TopHit) | 157 |
| UK Singles (Official Charts) | 40 |
| US Billboard Hot 100 | 1 |
| US Adult Contemporary (Billboard) | 19 |
| US Adult Pop Airplay (Billboard) | 11 |
| US Country Airplay (Billboard) | 1 |
| US Hot Country Songs (Billboard) | 1 |
| US Pop Airplay (Billboard) | 18 |

=== Monthly charts ===
2024 monthly chart performance for "Love Somebody"
| Chart (2024) | Peak position |
|---|---|
| Lithuania Airplay (TopHit) | 87 |

2025 monthly chart performance for "Love Somebody"
| Chart (2025) | Peak position |
|---|---|
| Romania Airplay (TopHit) | 80 |

=== Year-end charts ===
2024 year-end chart performance for "Love Somebody"
| Chart (2024) | Position |
|---|---|
| Netherlands (Dutch Top 40) | 96 |

2025 year-end chart performance for "Love Somebody"
| Chart (2025) | Position |
|---|---|
| Australia (ARIA) | 90 |
| Canada (Canadian Hot 100) | 11 |
| Canada AC (Billboard) | 34 |
| Canada Country (Billboard) | 9 |
| Canada Hot AC (Billboard) | 72 |
| Global 200 (Billboard) | 81 |
| Iceland (Tónlistinn) | 70 |
| Netherlands (Dutch Top 40) | 28 |
| US Billboard Hot 100 | 11 |
| US Adult Contemporary (Billboard) | 44 |
| US Adult Pop Airplay (Billboard) | 28 |
| US Country Airplay (Billboard) | 2 |
| US Hot Country Songs (Billboard) | 2 |
| US Pop Airplay (Billboard) | 47 |

== Certifications ==
Certifications for "Love Somebody"
| Region | Certification | Certified units/sales |
|---|---|---|
| Australia (ARIA) | Platinum | 70,000^{‡} |
| Brazil (Pro-Música Brasil) | Gold | 20,000^{‡} |
| United Kingdom (BPI) | Silver | 200,000^{‡} |
| United States (RIAA) | 3× Platinum | 3,000,000^{‡} |
^{‡} Sales+streaming figures based on certification alone.

== Release history ==
Release date and format for "Love Somebody"
| Region | Date | Format | Label | Ref. |
|---|---|---|---|---|
| Various | October 18, 2024 | Digital download; streaming | Big Loud; Republic; Mercury | |
| United States | October 22, 2024 | Contemporary hit radio | Big Loud; Republic; Mercury | |
