= Big Loud =

American independent record label

- Founded: 2011 in Nashville, Tennessee
- Founder: Craig Wiseman; Joey Moi; Kevin "Chief" Zaruk; Seth England
- Distributor: Virgin Nashville
- Genre: Country; rock; pop
- Location: Nashville, Tennessee
- Official website: bigloud.com

Big Loud is an American independent multi-sector entertainment company located in Nashville. It consists of a record label, along with music publishing and talent management divisions. Big Loud was founded in 2013 by Craig Wiseman, Joey Moi, Kevin "Chief" Zaruk, and Seth England. Artists who have recorded for Big Loud include Florida Georgia Line, Morgan Wallen, Chris Lane, Dallas Smith, and Hardy.

== History ==
Big Loud Records was established in 2015 by Nashville-based songwriter Craig Wiseman and Canadian record producer Joey Moi. Big Loud Records' first release was Chris Lane's "Fix". Lane released two albums for the label.

Jake Owen moved to Big Loud in 2018 after ending his contract with RCA Records Nashville. His first single with Big Loud Records, "I Was Jack (You Were Diane)", which topped country music charts that year. The song was the first single from Owen's 2019 album Greetings from... Jake.

After signing to Big Loud Records, Morgan Wallen achieved back-to-back No. 1 hits on the Billboard Country Airplay chart with "Up Down" and "Whiskey Glasses". The Big Loud Records roster expanded to include singer/songwriter Hardy and Sean Stemaly. Stacy Blythe, vice-president of promotion, was awarded the SVP-VP/Promotion trophy at the 2019 CRS/Country Aircheck Awards.

In 2021, Big Loud signed Canadian country artist Dallas Smith, the record holder for domestic number one hits on the Canada Country chart, to the label. Additionally, Smith, producer Scott Cooke, partner Alex Seif, and Big Loud formed a joint venture, Canadian-based imprint Local Hay Records. Shawn Austin was the first artist signed to the label.

== Well-known artists ==
=== Current ===
- Lauren Alaina
- Hailey Benedict (Local Hay)
- Ashley Cooke
- Kashus Culpepper
- Ernest
- Charles Wesley Godwin
- Hardy
- Timmy McKeever
- Brock Phillips (Local Hay)
- MacKenzie Porter
- Owen Riegling (Big Loud/Universal Canada)
- Dallas Smith
- Thelma & James
- Morgan Wallen
- Stephen Wilson Jr.

=== Former ===
- Shawn Austin (Local Hay)
- Larry Fleet
- Chris Lane
- Jillian Jacqueline
- Jake Owen
- Griffen Palmer
- Mason Ramsey (Big Loud/Atlantic)
- Sean Stemaly
- Hailey Whitters (Songs & Daughters/Pigasus)

== Big Loud Texas ==
- The Droptines
- Dylan Gossett (Big Loud Texas/Mercury)
- Coleman Jennings
- Alex Lambert
- Julianna Rankin
- Randy Rogers Band
- Jake Worthington

== Publishing ==
Founded in 2003 by songwriter Craig Wiseman, Big Loud Publishing, previously Big Loud Shirt, is a music publisher in the country format. Big Loud Publishing songwriters include Ashley Leone, Bren Joy, Chris Lane, Chris Tompkins, Craig Wiseman, Ernest Keith Smith, Griffen Palmer, Jacob Durrett, Jamie Moore, Joey Moi, John Byron, Madison Kozak, Matt Dragstrem, Rocky Block, Rodney Clawson, and Tiera. Big Loud Publishing has written more than 90 singles including Grammy Award winners "Live Like You Were Dying" by Tim McGraw and "Before He Cheats" and "Blown Away" by Carrie Underwood. On August 17, 2020, BLP's "Meant to Be" by Bebe Rexha featuring Florida Georgia Line was certified diamond by the Recording Industry Association of America. The song was named BMI's 2019 Pop Song of the Year. BLP is responsible for more than 50 No. 1 hits for artists including Blake Shelton, Florida Georgia Line, Luke Bryan, Rascal Flatts, LeAnn Rimes, George Strait, Faith Hill, Kenny Chesney, Beverley Knight, Three Days Grace, Jason Aldean, and Chris Lane.

== Management ==
Big Loud Management, previously Big Loud Mountain, has focused on artist development since 2011. Founded by the four Big Loud partners, the first act Big Loud Management signed was Florida Georgia Line, a country duo which was the Academy of Country Music's first recipient of the ACM Breakout Artist of the Decade Award, ACM Single of the Decade Award, and ACM Music Event of the Decade Award in 2019. BLM's roster includes Ben Burgess, Chris Lane, HARDY, MacKenzie Porter, Sean Stemaly, Bren Joy, Blame My Youth, Dallas Smith and ERNEST. BLM partnered with Maverick in 2017.

== Capital ==
Launched in 2017, Big Loud Capital is a venture capital group that invests in music, technology, and lifestyle industries. It is owned by the four Big Loud partners, Craig Wiseman, Joey Moi, Kevin "Chief" Zaruk, and Seth England. Among Big Loud Capital's portfolio includes 100 Thieves, Beyond Meat, Califia Farms, Casper, Coupang, 8i, Iris Nova, Kettle & Fire, LearnLux, Madefire, Magic Leap, Plus Capital, Roli, Seed, Stem, Sweetgreen, and Tecovas.

== Big Loud Rock ==
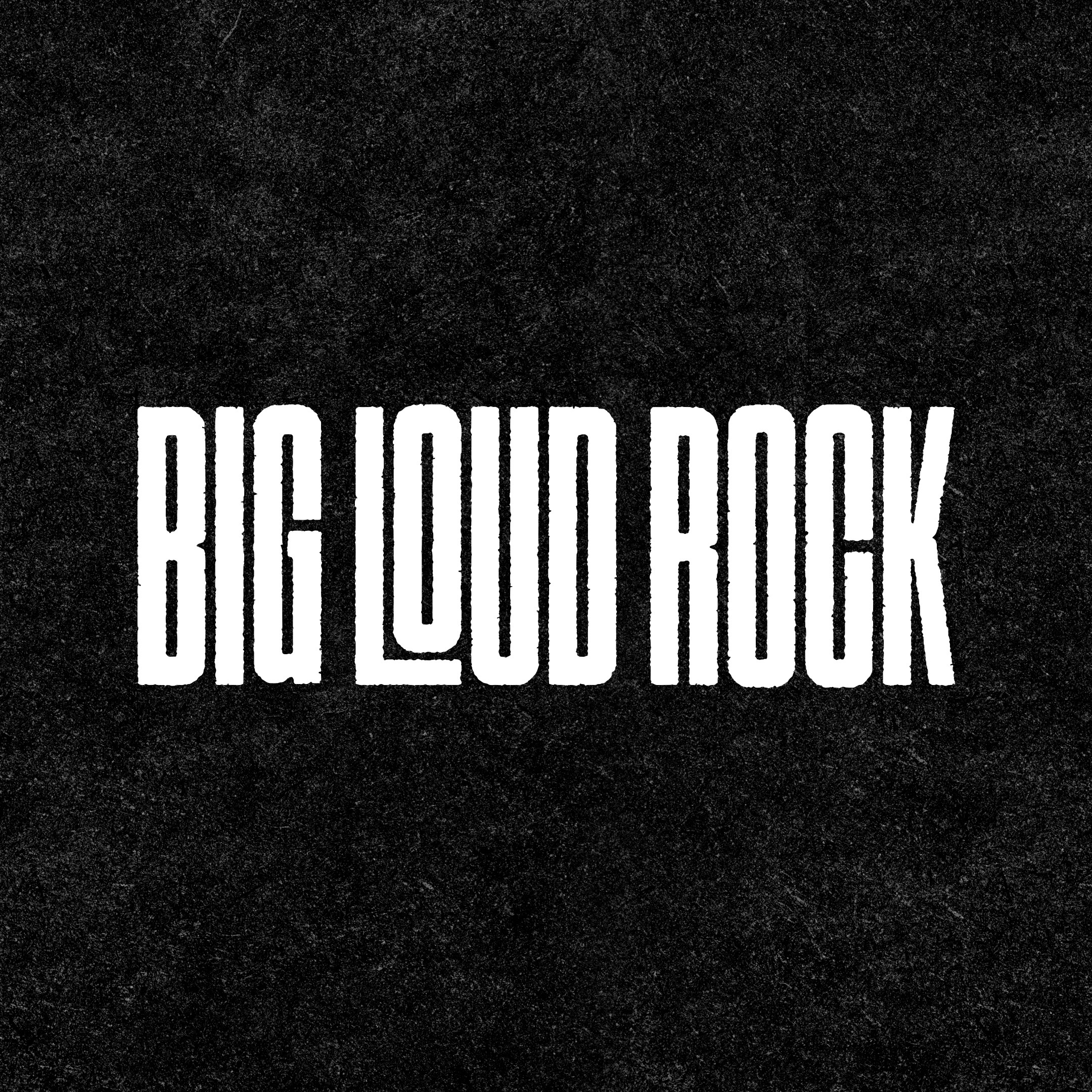
Logo for Big Loud Rock

Launched in August 2021, Big Loud Rock is the alternative/rock label of Big Loud Records.

=== Famous artists ===
- Dexter and the Moonrocks (via Severance)
- Hardy
- Jagwar Twin
- Yam Haus
- Landon Barker
