= Hardy discography =

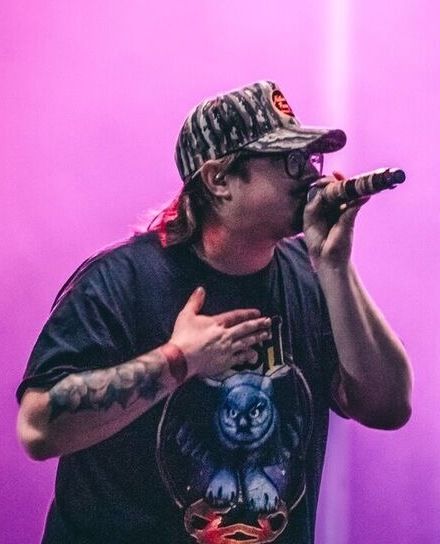
- Hardy in 2019
- Studio albums: 4
- EPs: 4
- Singles: 8
- Mixtapes: 2

American singer Hardy has released four studio albums, two extended plays, two mixtapes, and thirteen singles. He made his debut as a singer in 2019 with "Rednecker", a track from his EP This Ole Boy. This was followed by "One Beer", a collaboration with Devin Dawson and Lauren Alaina, found on Hardy's 2020 album A Rock. The song reached number one on Billboard Country Airplay. Hardy's 2023 album The Mockingbird & the Crow includes the duet "Wait in the Truck" with Lainey Wilson, as well as the tracks "Jack", "The Mockingbird & the Crow", and "Sold Out", all three of which entered the Hot Rock & Alternative Songs charts. Hardy is also featured on the songs "Some Things Never Change" by Dallas Smith, which reached number one on Canada Country, as well as the number-one Country Airplay single "Beers on Me", a collaboration with Dierks Bentley and Breland.

== Studio albums ==
List of studio albums, showing details about the respective album, selected chart positions, and certifications.
Title	Album details	Peak chart positions							Certifications
Title	Album details	US	US Country	US Indie	US Rock	AUS	AUS Country	CAN	Certifications
A Rock	Released: September 4, 2020; Label: Big Loud	24	4	4	—	—	20	34	RIAA: Platinum; MC: Gold
The Mockingbird & the Crow	Released: January 20, 2023; Label: Big Loud	4	1	1	1	74	6	6	RIAA: Platinum
Quit!!	Released: July 12, 2024; Label: Big Loud	23	—	—	6	—	—	69	
Country! Country!	Released: September 26, 2025; Label: Big Loud	22	4	—	—	—	—	94	

== Live albums ==
List of live albums, showing details about the respective album.
Title	Album details
Hardy (Live from Red Rocks)	Released: February 7, 2025; Label: Big Loud

== Mixtapes ==
List of mixtapes, showing details about the respective mixtape, and selected chart positions.
Title	Album details	Peak chart positions	
Title	Album details	US Country	US Indie
Hixtape, Vol. 1	Released: September 13, 2019; Label: Big Loud, Tree Vibez	35	34
Hixtape, Vol. 2	Released: December 10, 2021; Label: Big Loud	—	—

== Extended plays ==
List of extended plays, showing details about the respective extended plays, and references.
Title	EP details	Peak chart positions
Title	EP details	US Country
This Ole Boy	Released: October 19, 2018; Label: Big Loud, Tree Vibez; Formats: Digital download	—
Where to Find Me	Released: January 18, 2019; Label: Big Loud, Tree Vibez; Formats: Digital download	—
Country!	Released: May 2, 2025; Label: Big Loud	47
Sides	Released: October 30, 2026; Label: Big Loud	—

== Singles ==
=== As lead artist ===
Title	Year	Peak chart positions										Certifications	Album
Title	Year	US	US Country Songs	US Country Airplay	US Rock Airplay	US Rock	US Hard Rock	US Main.	CAN	CAN Country	WW	Certifications	Album
"Rednecker"	2019	— (Note: "Rednecker" did not enter the Billboard Hot 100, but peaked at number 18 on the Bubbling Under Hot 100 chart.)	23	26	—	—	—	—	— (Note: "Rednecker" did not enter the Canadian Hot 100, but peaked at number 37 on the Hot Canadian Digital Song Sales chart.)	17	—	RIAA: 2× Platinum; MC: Platinum	This Ole Boy
"One Beer" (featuring Lauren Alaina and Devin Dawson)	2020	33	4	1	—	—	—	—	43	1	191	RIAA: 4× Platinum; MC: 2× Platinum; RMNZ: Gold	A Rock
"Give Heaven Some Hell"	2021	69	16	11	—	—	—	—	86	8	—	RIAA: 3× Platinum; MC: Platinum	A Rock
"Wait in the Truck" (featuring Lainey Wilson)	2022	23	5	2	—	—	—	—	42	3	118	RIAA: 3× Platinum	The Mockingbird & the Crow
"Jack"	2022	— (Note: "Jack" did not enter the Billboard Hot 100, but peaked at number 21 on the Bubbling Under Hot 100 chart.)	—	—	5	21	2	3	—	—	—	RIAA: Gold	The Mockingbird & the Crow
"The Mockingbird & the Crow"	2023	—	—	—	—	31	4	—	—	—	—		The Mockingbird & the Crow
"Truck Bed"	2023	27	6	1	—	—	—	—	57	2	—	RIAA: 3× Platinum; RMNZ: Gold	The Mockingbird & the Crow
"Sold Out"	2023	—	—	—	20	21	1	7	—	—	—	RIAA: Platinum	The Mockingbird & the Crow
"Quit!!"	2024	—	—	—	—	32	2	—	—	—	—		Quit!!
"Rockstar"	2024	—	—	—	22	31	1	6	—	—	—		Quit!!
"Psycho"	2024	—	—	—	14	27	1	5	—	—	—		Quit!!
"Jim Bob"	2024	—	—	—	18	37	2	4	—	—	—		Quit!!
"Six Feet Under (Caleigh's Song)"	2024	—	—	39	—	32	2	—	—	—	—		Quit!!
"Favorite Country Song"	2025	38	14	1	—	—	—	—	59	2	—		Country! Country!
"Bottomland"	2025	— (Note: "Bottomland" did not enter the Billboard Hot 100, but peaked at number 10 on the Bubbling Under Hot 100 chart.)	31	—	—	—	—	—	—	—	—		Country! Country!
"McArthur" (featuring Eric Church, Morgan Wallen and Tim McGraw)	2026	31	6	17	—	—	—	—	41	35	169		Non-album single
"By God"	2026	—	47	32	—	—	—	—	—	—	—		Sides
"—" denotes a recording that did not chart.

=== As featured artist ===
Title	Year	Peak chart positions					Certifications	Album
Title	Year	US	US Country Songs	US Country Airplay	CAN	CAN Country	Certifications	Album
"Some Things Never Change" (Dallas Smith featuring Hardy)	2020	—	—	—	55	1	MC: Gold	Timeless
"What Do I Know" (Robert Counts featuring Hardy)	2020	—	—	—	—	—		Non-album single
"The Worst Country Song of All Time" (Brantley Gilbert featuring Hardy and Toby Keith)	2021	—	31	32	—	—		So Help Me God
"Beers on Me" (Dierks Bentley featuring Breland and Hardy)	2021	40	5	1	61	2	RIAA: 2× Platinum	Non-album single
"The Better Me" (Beartooth featuring Hardy)	2023	—	—	—	—	—		The Surface
"Zombieland" (Jax featuring Hardy)	2024	—	—	—	—	—		Dear Joe,
"Hillbilly Deluxe" (Brooks & Dunn featuring Hardy)	2024	—	—	—	—	—		Reboot II
"Nobody Likes Your Girlfriend" (Nate Smith featuring Hardy)	2025	— (Note: "Nobody Likes Your Girlfriend" did not enter the Billboard Hot 100, but peaked at number 19 on the Bubbling Under Hot 100 chart.)	29	—	—	—		Non-album singles
"All My Women" (Falling in Reverse featuring Hardy)	2025	—	—	—	—	—		Non-album singles
"—" denotes a recording that did not chart.

== Other charted and certified songs ==
List of other charted songs, showing year released, selected chart positions, certifications, and album name.
Title	Year	Peak chart positions						Certifications	Album
Title	Year	US	US Country Songs	US Country Digital	US Rock	US Hard Rock	CAN	Certifications	Album
"He Went to Jared" (featuring Morgan Wallen)	2019	—	—	—	—	—	—	RIAA: Gold	Hixtape: Vol. 1
"Turn You Down" (featuring Morgan Wallen and Zakk Wylde)	2019	—	—	—	—	—	—	RIAA: Gold	Hixtape: Vol. 1
"Y'all Boys" (Florida Georgia Line featuring Hardy)	2019	—	—	15	—	—	—		Can't Say I Ain't Country
"Truck"	2020	—	50	—	—	—	—	RIAA: Gold	A Rock
"Boots"	2020	—	—	—	—	—	—	RIAA: Platinum	A Rock
"Unapologetically Country as Hell"	2020	—	—	—	—	—	—	RIAA: Platinum	A Rock
"Blurry"	2021	—	—	—	—	19	—		Non-album song
"Beer"	2023	—	47	—	—	—	—		The Mockingbird & the Crow
"Red" (featuring Morgan Wallen)	2023	64	16	4	—	—	74	RIAA: Gold	The Mockingbird & the Crow
"Drink One for Me"	2023	—	48	—	—	—	—		The Mockingbird & the Crow
".30-06"	2023	—	45	—	29	6	—		The Mockingbird & the Crow
"I Ain't in the Country No More"	2023	—	—	—	33	9	—		The Mockingbird & the Crow
"Radio Song" (featuring Jeremy McKinnon)	2023	—	41	—	25	3	—		The Mockingbird & the Crow
"Kill Shit Till I Die"	2023	—	—	—	37	12	—		The Mockingbird & the Crow
"The Redneck Song"	2023	—	—	—	43	13	—		The Mockingbird & the Crow
"WHYBMWL"	2024	—	—	—	—	9	—		Quit!!
"Happy Hour" (featuring Knox)	2024	—	—	—	—	4	—		Quit!!
"Good Girl Phase" (featuring Chad Smith)	2024	—	—	—	—	11	—		Quit!!
"Soul4Sale" (featuring Fred Durst)	2024	—	—	—	—	14	—		Quit!!
"I Don't Miss"	2024	—	—	—	—	12	—		Quit!!
"Orphan"	2024	—	—	—	—	21	—		Quit!!
"Live Forever"	2024	—	—	—	—	17	—		Quit!!
"Time to Be Dead"	2024	—	—	—	—	19	—		Quit!!
"Hide My Gun" (Post Malone featuring Hardy)	2024	65	28	—	—	—	51		F-1 Trillion
"Come Back as a Redneck" (Morgan Wallen featuring Hardy)	2025	63	31	—	—	—	—		I'm the Problem
"Never Met Anyone Like You" (Ella Langley featuring Hardy)	2025	— (Note: "Never Met Anyone Like You" did not enter the Billboard Hot 100, but peaked at number 4 on the Bubbling Under Hot 100 chart.)	39	—	—	—	87	RIAA: Gold	Non-album song
"—" denotes a recording that did not chart.

== Music videos ==
Year	Video	Director
2019	"Rednecker"	Justin Clough
2019	"Signed, Sober You"	Peter Zavadil
2020	"One Beer" (featuring Lauren Alaina and Devin Dawson)	Justin Clough
2020	"Give Heaven Some Hell"	Justin Clough
2020	"A Rock"	Justin Clough and Benjamin Skipworth
2021	"Some Things Never Change" (with Dallas Smith)	Stephano Barberis
2021	"Blurry"	Tanner Gallagher
2021	"The Worst Country Song of All Time" (with Brantley Gilbert and Toby Keith)	Brantley Gilbert and Brian Vaughn
2022	"Sold Out"	Tanner Gallagher
2022	"Wait in the Truck" (featuring Lainey Wilson)	Justin Clough
2022	"Jack"	Justin Clough
2023	"The Mockingbird & the Crow"	Lee Hardcastle
2023	"Truck Bed"	Justin Clough
2024	"Rockstar"	Justin Clough
2024	"Psycho"	Justin Clough
2024	"Happy Hour" (featuring Knox)	Justin Clough
2024	"Soul4Sale" (featuring Fred Durst)	Billy Boman
2025	"Jim Bob"	Justin Clough
2025	"Favorite Country Song"	Justin Clough
