= Hardy (Live from Red Rocks) =

Live album by Hardy
- Released: February 7, 2025
- Recorded: October 20 and 21, 2024
- Venue: Red Rocks Amphitheatre
- Genre: Country rock; nu metal
- Label: Big Loud
- Producer: Harry Miree

Hardy chronology
Quit!! (2024)	Hardy (Live from Red Rocks) (2025)	Country! Country! (2025)

Hardy (Live from Red Rocks) is a live album by country rock singer Hardy. Released on February 7, 2025, the album spans his performances at the iconic Red Rocks Amphitheatre in Morrison, Colorado. The album contains live recordings of songs from each of his studio albums, a vast majority from his recent two rock-influenced albums, The Mockingbird & the Crow, and Quit!!.

== Content ==
The album, recorded at the Red Rocks Amphitheatre, is Hardy's first live album release. It contains songs from each of his studio albums, including a cover of Blake Shelton's single "God's Country", which Hardy also co-wrote.

== Track listing ==
Hardy (Live from Red Rocks) track listing
No.	Title	Writer(s)	Length
1.	"Quit!!"	Michael Hardy; Jacob Durrett
2.	"Rockstar"	Hardy; Durrett; Blake Pendergrass
3.	"Kill Shit Till I Die"	Hardy; David Garcia; Hunter Phelps
4.	"Jack"	Hardy; Garcia; Hillary Lindsey
5.	"Boots"	Hardy; Garcia; Lindsey
6.	"One Beer"	Hardy; Lindsey; Jake Mitchell
7.	"Radio Song"	Hardy; Zach Abend; Nick Donley; Jeremy McKinnon; Cody Quistad
8.	"Happy Hour"	Hardy; Smith Ahnquist; Donley; Jacob Mitchell; Cameron Montgomery; Phelps
9.	"A Rock"	Hardy; Ahnquist; Mitchell
10.	"Six Feet Under (Caleigh's Song)"	Hardy
11.	"Rednecker"	Hardy
12.	"Wait in the Truck"	Hardy; Renee Blair; Phelps; Jordan Schmidt
13.	"Jim Bob"	Hardy; Garcia; Phelps; Quistad
14.	"Give Heaven Some Hell"	Hardy; Ashley Gorley; Ben Johnson; Phelps
15.	".30-06"	Hardy; Montgomery; Phelps; Rich
16.	"Truck Bed"	Hardy; Gorley; Johnson; Phelps
17.	"Sold Out"	Hardy; Garcia; Phelps
18.	"Psycho"	Hardy; Zach Abend; Tyler Hubbard; Jaclyn Cole Miskanic
19.	"God's Country"	Devin Dawson; Hardy; Schmidt
20.	"Unapologetically Country As Hell"	Hardy; Ahnquist; Donley; Mitchell
