= Rockstar (Hardy song) =

Single by Hardy

from the album Quit!!
- Released: February 9, 2024
- Genre: Country rock
- Label: Big Loud
- Songwriters: Michael Hardy; Jacob Durrett; Blake Pendergrass
- Producers: Joey Moi; Hardy; Durrett

Hardy singles chronology
"Quit!!" (2024)	"Rockstar" (2024)	"Psycho" (2024)

Music video
- "Rockstar" on YouTube

"Rockstar" (stylized in all caps) is a song by American country rock singer Hardy, released on February 9, 2024, as the second single from his third studio album, Quit!!. An accompanying music video was released alongside the song.

On April 6, 2024, Hardy teamed up with Canadian rock band Nickelback for an episode of CMT Crossroads (both acts having worked with producer Joey Moi). The show contained several of both artist's songs, including Hardy's "Sold Out", "Truck Bed" and "Give Heaven Some Hell", along with Nickelback's "Animals", "How You Remind Me", and "Savin' Me". "Rockstar" was played to close out the show, mashed up with Nickelback's song of the same title.

== Lyrics and composition ==
The song, as a whole, speaks on the life of a rock artist, aptly titled "Rockstar". The opening line to the song, and the hook to the chorus, makes a joke about everyone in the industry charting songs called "Rockstar", poking fun at other songs on pop radio with the same title such as Post Malone's "Rockstar", DaBaby's "Rockstar", and most closely related (and also mentioned later in the song), Nickelback's "Rockstar". The first verse goes on about how Hardy is finally making it in the music scene, and now he has to "check the box" of writing a song called "Rockstar". In the second verse, Hardy continues on about how he has become a household name and how a kid dressed up as him for Halloween, and went to a party where everyone sang "My town's smaller than your town", a reference to his debut single, "Rednecker", in which that lyric begins the chorus.

== Commercial performance ==
"Rockstar" was a commercial success, and reached No. 1 on the US Billboard Hot Hard Rock Songs chart, becoming Hardy's first No. 1 on the respective chart. It also peaked within the top 5 on the US Billboard Mainstream Rock Airplay chart, after being released to rock radio.

== Charts ==
Chart performance for "Rockstar"
Chart (2025)	Peak position
US Hot Hard Rock Songs (Billboard)	1
US Hot Rock & Alternative Songs (Billboard)	31
US Mainstream Rock (Billboard)	6
US Rock & Alternative Airplay (Billboard)	22
