= Victoria's Secret (disambiguation) =

Victoria's Secret is an American brand, manufacturer and marketer of women's lingerie, womenswear and beauty products.

Victoria's Secret may also refer to:

- "Victoria's Secret" (song), a 2022 song by Jax
- "Victoria's Secret", a 2003 song by Sonata Arctica from Winterheart's Guild
- "Victoria's Secret", a 1996 song by Jay Semko, Jack Lenz and John K. McCarthy from Due South: The Original Television Soundtrack
