= Harry Miree =

American drummer

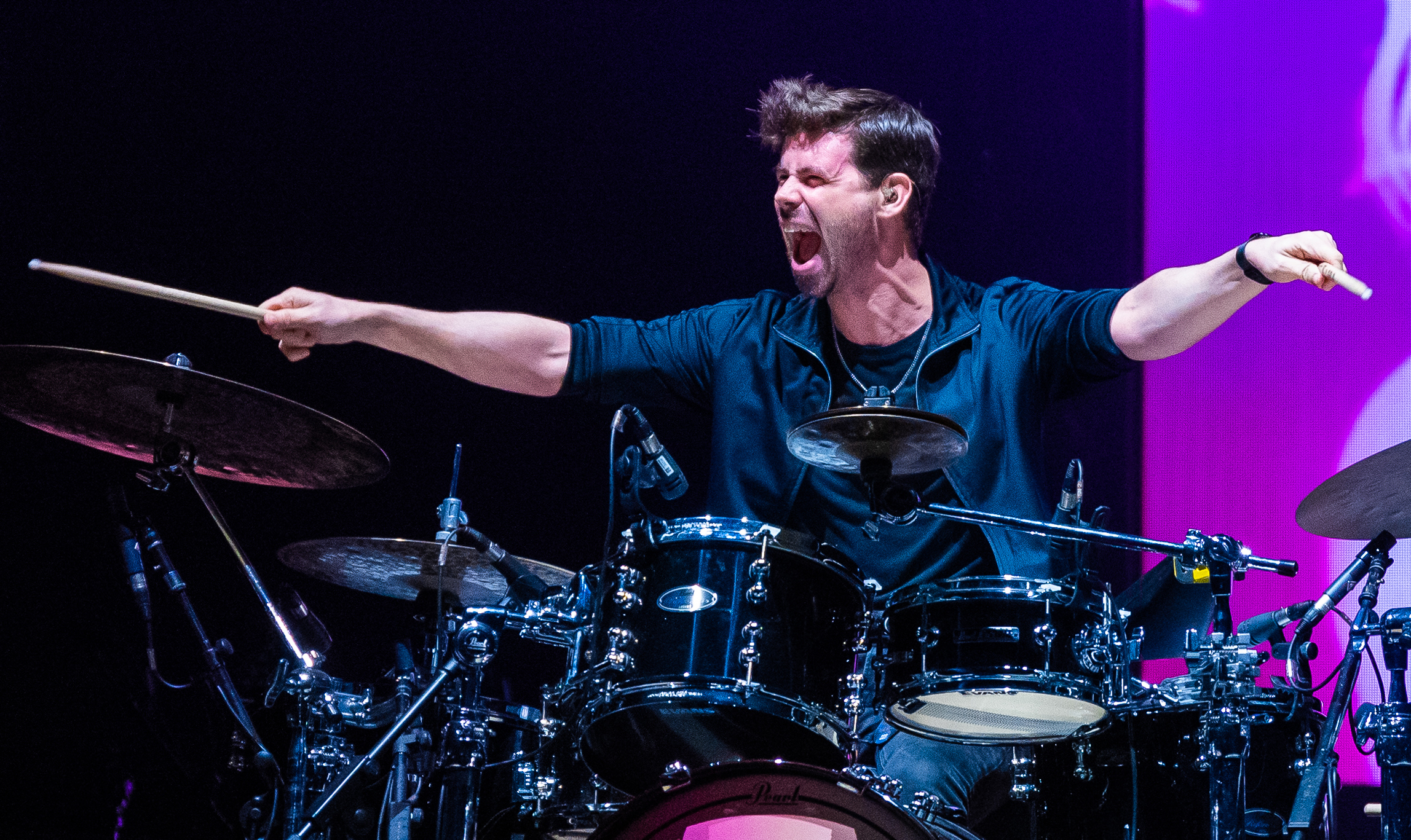
- Miree in 2021

Background information
- Born: Harrison Moore Miree; Birmingham, Alabama, U.S.
- Occupations: Drummer, Musical Director
- Website: harrymiree.com

Harrison Moore Miree (Born 1988) is an American musician from Birmingham, Alabama. He has served as the touring drummer and musical director for HARDY since 2019, and as a session musician has performed with Lindsay Ell, LoCash, Nashville's Clare Bowen, Ryan Follese of Hot Chelle Rae, Troy Cartwright, Levi Hummon, and others. Miree is known for his humorous overuse of the word "dude" and open-handed playing style, earning popularity in the drumming community through millions of views of his original videos on the streaming platform YouTube.

== Career ==
Miree was a founding member of Boom City, a rock band signed to T.H.E. (an imprint of Atlantic Records Group) that disbanded in 2012 under a settlement to redact all previous commercial recordings, resulting in the folding of the T.H.E. imprint. In 2013 Miree graduated magna cum laude from Berklee College of Music and moved to Nashville to serve as touring drummer and musical director for recording artist Whitney Wolanin.

In 2014, Miree began posting a weekly YouTube video series entitled "DudeThoughts" which chronicled his rise through the ranks of professional drumming, amassing millions of views and earning him YouTube's Silver Creator Award in 2019 and a Webby Award in 2021. Through these videos and his popular appearances on Drumeo, Miree became known for his unique open-handed drumming technique in which he utilizes a remote hi-hat (instead of traditional hi-hat) for his primary hats.

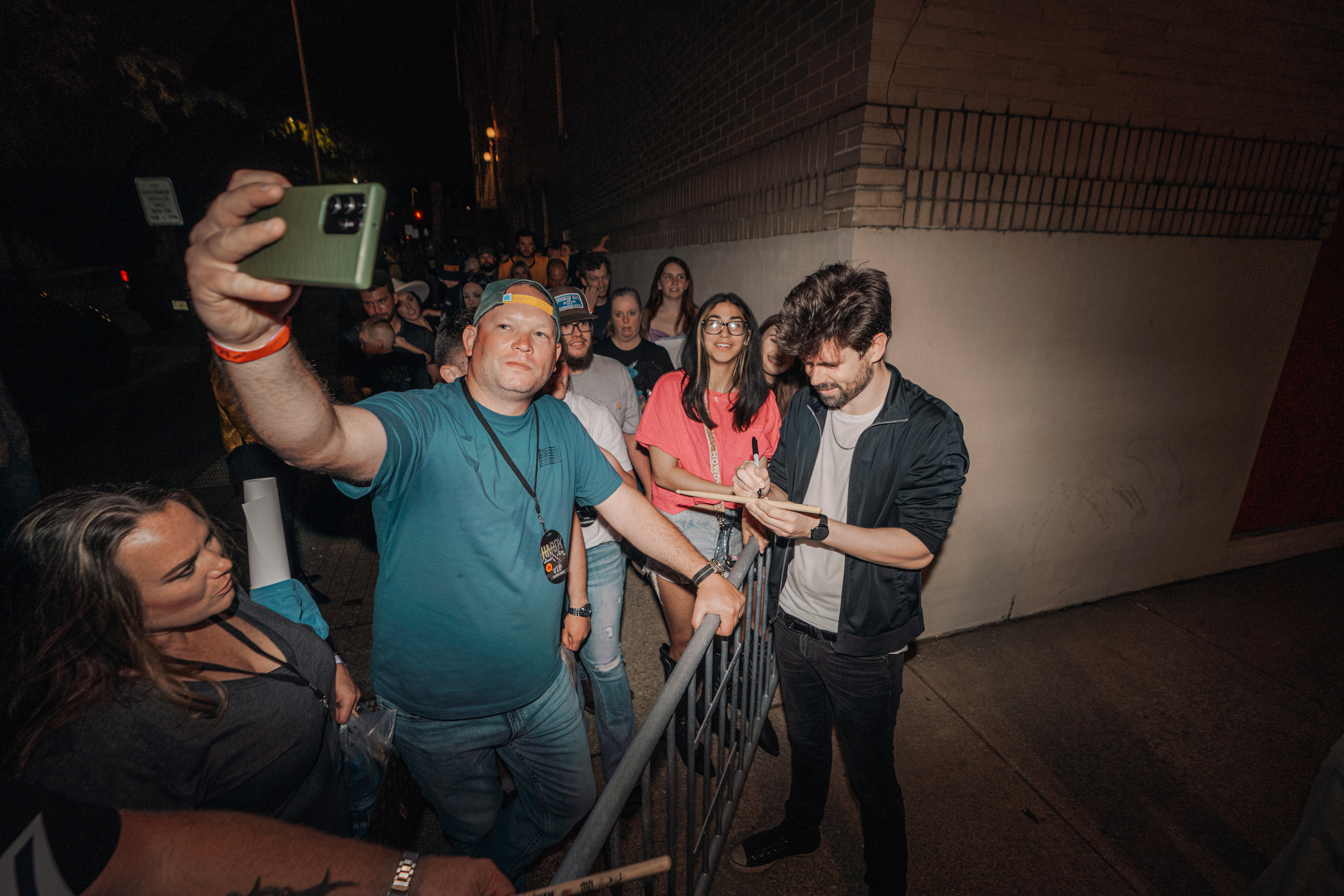
Miree signing autographs on the mockingbird & THE CROW Tour in 2023

From 2015 through 2021, Miree toured with Levi Hummon, Clare Bowen, Troy Cartwright, LoCash, Ryan Follese of Hot Chelle Rae, and Lindsay Ell.

From 2019 to present day Miree has served as touring drummer and musical director for HARDY. In addition to his touring roles, Miree produced the HARDY albums Live from Red Rocks and the Amazon Music exclusive "Songline". In 2024 Miree music-directed Nickelback and HARDY's collaboration on CMT Crossroads.

== Drumming techniques ==
Miree's popularity among drummers stems from his unorthodox use of remote hi-hats (instead of traditional hi-hats) as his primary hats. Miree's drums are configured left-handed but right-footed, allowing him to play the kit right-handed to create an open-handed effect, which he has dubbed "open-handed drumming for the lazy". Though Miree pioneered the so-called "lazy" style of open-handed drumming, he credits Dave Matthews Band drummer Carter Beauford for the original inspiration to play open-handed, and has paid tribute to Beauford throughout his YouTube videos, magazine interviews, and promotional appearances on shows such as Drumeo.

Miree has openly discouraged the traditional practice of teaching rudiments to developing students, stating that the needed elements to learn drumming exist organically in music, and that the use of robotic elements like rudiments early in development threaten what should otherwise be a joyful process of learning a musical instrument.

== Equipment ==
Miree uses Pearl Drums, Meinl cymbals, Evans drumheads, and Vic Firth drumsticks, with whom he developed and uses a signature drumstick model called "Harry Miree's DudeStick".

== Philanthropy ==
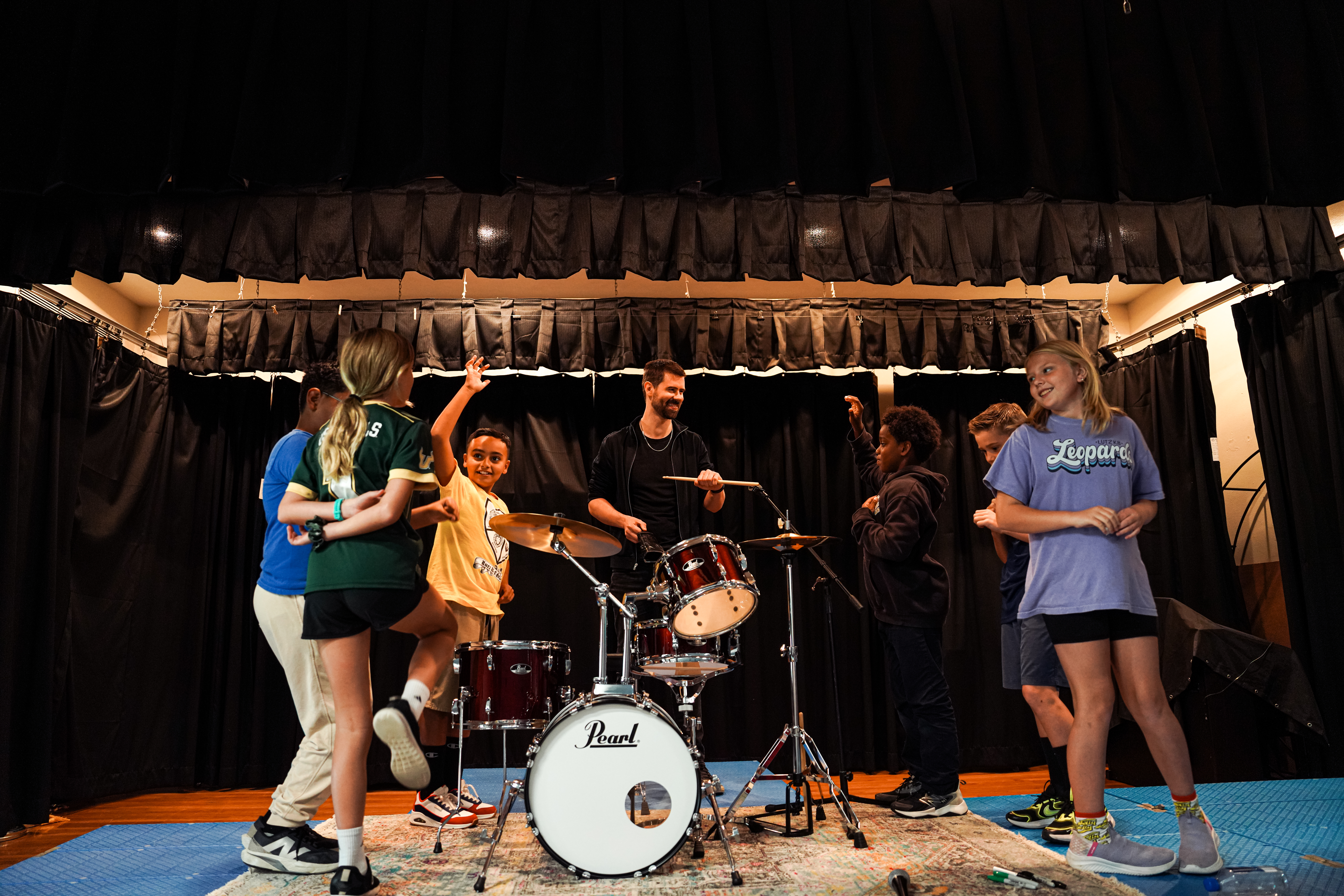
Miree visiting Lutz K-8 School near Tampa, FL

Miree was a founding member of the Birmingham, Alabama based non-profit Scrollworks, which formed in 2007 to bring free music education to underfunded public schools that suffered from little or no curricular arts budget.

In 2021, Miree partnered with basketball star Charles Barkley and charity Little Kids Rock to donate 100 drum sets to local schools along Miree's United States tour route with HARDY. Miree and Barkley fulfilled the 100 drum set donation quota in 2023 but have continued donating drum sets and school visits on subsequent tours in 2024 and 2025.

In 2025, the music education nonprofit Music Will named Miree, Kristen Chenoweth, Tom Morello, and Wyclef Jean to its National Advisory Board.

== Awards and nominations ==
Year	Award	Category	Nominee(s)	Result	Ref.
2021	Webby Awards	Best Individual Performance (Video)	DudeThoughts: A Day in the Life of a Road Musician	Won	
2023	Drumeo Awards	Country Drummer of the Year	Harry Miree	Won	
2025	Modern Drummer Readers Poll	Country	Harry Miree	Nominated	

== Personal life ==
While Miree was in college, his brother Kyser was murdered at home in Mobile, Alabama. During the public outrage that followed, Miree urged the press to "love and forgive" Kyser's killers.

Miree has spoken publicly and to suicide grief support groups on his experiences with suicidal ideation.
