= Country! Country! =

Studio album by Hardy
- Released: September 26, 2025
- Genres: Country; country rock
- Length: 69:00
- Label: Big Loud
- Producer: Joey Moi

Hardy chronology
| Hardy (Live from Red Rocks) (2025) | Country! Country! (2025) |

Singles from Country! Country!
- 1. "Favorite Country Song" Released: April 11, 2025; 2. "Bottomland" Released: August 1, 2025

Country! Country! is the fourth studio album by American singer-songwriter Hardy. Released on September 26, 2025, the album marks a return to country music for Hardy, after exploring rock on his second album, The Mockingbird & the Crow, and more fully exploring the sound on his most recent album, Quit!!. Artists featured on the album include Ernest and Stephen Wilson Jr.

== Background ==
In April 2025, following two non-traditional album releases, Hardy (Live from Red Rocks) and Hardy (Amazon Music Songline), Hardy announced his upcoming Country! EP, alongside an announcement of two songs releasing on April 11, "Favorite Country Song" and "Buck on the Wall". The full Country! EP was released on May 2, 2025, containing five songs. Following the release, "Favorite Country Song" was sent to country radio as the only single from the EP.

In July 2025, Hardy teased a new song on his social media, eventually revealed to be titled "Bottomland". On July 30, 2025, Hardy announced his fourth studio album, Country! Country!, to release on September 26, 2025. In turn, "Bottomland", was released on August 1. On August 15, Hardy revealed the full tracklist via social media, simultaneously revealing two features, Ernest and Stephen Wilson Jr. On August 20, 2025, Hardy teased the third track off the album, "Bro Country" featuring singer-songwriter Ernest. A few days later it was announced that "Bro Country" would be released August 29, 2025, as the next single from the album.

== Track listing ==
Country! Country! track listing
| No. | Title | Writer(s) | Length |
|---|---|---|---|
| 1. | "Country Country" | Michael Hardy; David Garcia; Ashley Gorley | 3:58 |
| 2. | "Favorite Country Song" | Hardy; Zach Abend; Beau Bailey; Gorley; Taylor Phillips; Nate Smith | 3:13 |
| 3. | "Bro Country" (featuring Ernest) | Hardy; Mark Holman; Ernest Keith Smith | 4:45 |
| 4. | "Luckiest Man Alive" | Hardy; Gorley; Ben Johnson; Hunter Phelps | 2:59 |
| 5. | "Car That Drove You Away" | Abend; Drew Parker; Matt Roy; Geoff Warburton | 3:04 |
| 6. | "Girl with a Gun" | Hardy; Greylan James; Jordan Schmidt; Carson Wallace | 3:04 |
| 7. | "Buck on the Wall" | Hardy; Matt Dragstrem; Jeb Gipson; Jameson Rodgers | 3:04 |
| 8. | "I'd Go Crazy Too" | Hardy; Phelps | 3:30 |
| 9. | "Take the Country and Run" | Hardy; Garcia; Gorley | 3:37 |
| 10. | "Goodbye" | Hardy; Jessie Jo Dillon; Cam Montgomery; Phelps | 3:21 |
| 11. | "Bedrooms in the Sky" (featuring Stephen Wilson Jr.) | Hardy; Abend; Phelps | 3:38 |
| 12. | "Bottomland" | Hardy; Abend; Smith Ahnquist; Dillon; Phelps | 3:04 |
| 13. | "Who Don't" | Hardy; Abend; Dillon; James | 3:01 |
| 14. | "Country in Me" | Hardy; Gorley; Johnson; Parker | 3:24 |
| 15. | "Gun to My Head" | Hardy; Ahnquist; Kyle Clark; Holman | 3:48 |
| 16. | "Keep It Country" | Hardy; Ahnquist; Garcia; Phelps | 3:36 |
| 17. | "Y'all Need Jesus" | Hardy; Abend; Dillon; Parker | 2:52 |
| 18. | "Dog Years" | Hardy | 4:16 |
| 19. | "We're All Gonna Die" | Hardy; Dillon; Dragstrem; Phelps | 3:00 |
| 20. | "Everybody Does" | Hardy | 3:55 |
| Total length: | | | 69:00 |

== Personnel ==
Credits adapted from Tidal.

=== Musicians ===
- Michael Hardy – vocals (all tracks), background vocals (tracks 4, 13); foot stomps, hand claps (14)
- Derek Wells – electric guitar (1–11, 13–20); foot stomps, hand claps (14)
- Jimmie Lee Sloas – bass (1–11, 13–19); foot stomps, hand claps (14)
- Wes Hightower – background vocals (1–11, 13–19)
- Jerry Roe – drums (1–11, 13–17, 19), tambourine (4, 8, 10, 19); foot stomps, hand claps (14)
- Alex Wright – Hammond B3 (1–3, 13, 17), keyboards (1, 3, 8, 9, 11, 13, 14, 16–19), Wurlitzer electronic piano (2), bass synthesizer (11); foot stomps, hand claps (14)
- Bryan Sutton – acoustic guitar (1, 2, 4–7, 9–11, 13–18), banjo (1, 13, 17), mandolin (2, 4, 5, 17, 18), guitar (4, 7, 11, 13), electric guitar (13); Dobro guitar, foot stomps, hand claps (14)
- Ilya Toshinskiy – acoustic guitar (3, 8, 19)
- Joey Moi – drum programming (3)
- Ernest – vocals (3)
- Dave Cohen – Hammond B3, Wurlitzer electronic piano (4); keyboards (5, 7, 10, 15); harpsichord, upright piano (10)
- David Garcia – programming (9)
- Jacob Durrett – programming (9)
- Stephen Wilson Jr. – vocals (11)
- Zach Abend – programming (12)
- Mark Holman – programming (15)
- Matt Dragstrem – programming (19)

=== Technical ===
- Joey Moi – production, mixing (1–11, 13–20)
- Zach Abend – production, mixing, engineering, digital editing (12)
- Ted Jensen – mastering
- Ryan Yount – engineering (1, 2, 4–11, 13–18), digital editing (all tracks), engineering assistance (3, 19)
- Josh Ditty – engineering, digital editing (3, 19)
- Bryan Sutton – engineering (20)
- Michael Hardy – vocal engineering
- Eivind Nordland – digital editing
- Matt McCartney – digital editing
- Scott Cooke – digital editing
- Austin Brown – engineering assistance (1, 2, 5, 6, 10, 13–18)
- Katelyn Prieboy – engineering assistance (1, 2, 6, 7, 10, 11, 13, 14, 16–18)
- Sean Badum – engineering assistance (3, 8, 19)
- Chris Ashburn – engineering assistance (4, 9)
- Grant Wilson – engineering assistance (4, 9)
- Carlos Chavez – engineering assistance (5, 15)
- Ethan Shull – engineering assistance (7, 11)
- Ally Gecewicz – production coordination

== Charts ==
Chart performance for Country! Country!
| Chart (2025) | Peak position |
|---|---|
| Australian Country Albums (ARIA) | 16 |
| Canadian Albums (Billboard) | 94 |
| US Billboard 200 | 22 |
| US Top Country Albums (Billboard) | 4 |
