= Beers on Me =

2021 song by Dierks Bentley

Single by Dierks Bentley featuring Breland and Hardy
- Released: July 29, 2021
- Genre: Country
- Length: 2:54
- Label: Capitol Nashville; Atlantic; Big Loud
- Songwriters: Ashley Gorley; Luke Dick; Ross Copperman; Breland; Dierks Bentley; Michael Hardy; Nicolle Galyon; Ben Johnson; Niko Moon
- Producers: Ross Copperman; Dierks Bentley

Dierks Bentley singles chronology
"Gone" (2020)	"Beers on Me" (2021)	"New Old Trucks" (2021)

Breland singles chronology
"High Horse" (2021)	"Beers on Me" (2021)	"Praise the Lord" (2022)

Hardy singles chronology
"The Worst Country Song of All Time" (2021)	"Beers on Me" (2021)	"Wait in the Truck" (2022)

Music video
- "Beers on Me" on YouTube

"Beers on Me" is a song recorded by American country music singers Dierks Bentley, Breland, and Hardy. It was released on July 29, 2021 as the second of two "Covid holdover songs". The song was co-written by Ashley Gorley, Luke Dick, Ross Copperman, Breland, Hardy and Bentley, who also produced the track with Copperman.

== Background ==
Bentley and Hardy created the song during the recuperation in Colorado, then Bentley completed the tune with Breland in Nashville. Bentley shared the process in a press: “Hardy threw out this title, and I remember immediately thinking, ‘I wish I could buy all my fans a beer.’ After the year we’ve all had, it would be nice to get the first round and say, ‘Hey, we all have some problems, but we’re going to forget about them for a little while…the beers are on me, I came back to Nashville to record the song and came across an article about Breland in the Nashville Scene. I got his number, and he came in the next day and wrote and sang the third verse. It was truly an organic collaboration, and I couldn’t be more proud to have him and Hardy on this song with me.”

== Content ==
"Beers on Me" is about friends meeting at a bar to consume alcohol together.

== Music video ==
The music video was released on October 27, 2021, and starred by the three artists. It features all three artists as they drive a truck loaded with boxes of beer around Nashville, and "hand out free beer to unsuspecting people", the locations including "a poolside party, a dog park, a street basketball court and Bentley's own Whiskey Row bar."

== Live performance ==
Bentley, Breland and Hardy performed the track from Whiskey Row in Nashville for the first time.

== Commercial performance ==
"Beers On Me" peaked at number one on the country charts in April 2022 (Billboard). It became Dierks 18th, Hardy's second as well as Brelands first.

== Personnel ==
Credits by AllMusic

- Dierks Bentley - lead vocals
- Breland - featured vocals
- Ross Copperman - acoustic guitar, electric guitar, keyboards, programming, background vocals
- Luke Dick - electric guitar
- Hardy - featured vocals
- Tony Lucido - bass guitar
- Danny Rader - acoustic guitar, electric guitar, keyboards, programming
- Aaron Sterling - drums

== Charts ==
=== Weekly charts ===
Weekly chart performance for "Beers on Me"
Chart (2021–2022)	Peak position
Canada Hot 100 (Billboard)	61
Canada Country (Billboard)	2
US Billboard Hot 100	40
US Country Airplay (Billboard)	1
US Hot Country Songs (Billboard)	5

=== Year-end charts ===
2022 year-end chart performance for "Beers on Me"
Chart (2022)	Position
US Country Airplay (Billboard)	22
US Hot Country Songs (Billboard)	29
US Radio Songs (Billboard)	74

== Certifications ==
Region	Certification	Certified units/sales
United States (RIAA)	2× Platinum	2,000,000^{‡}
^{‡} Sales+streaming figures based on certification alone.
