= Knox (American musician) =

American pop singer and songwriter

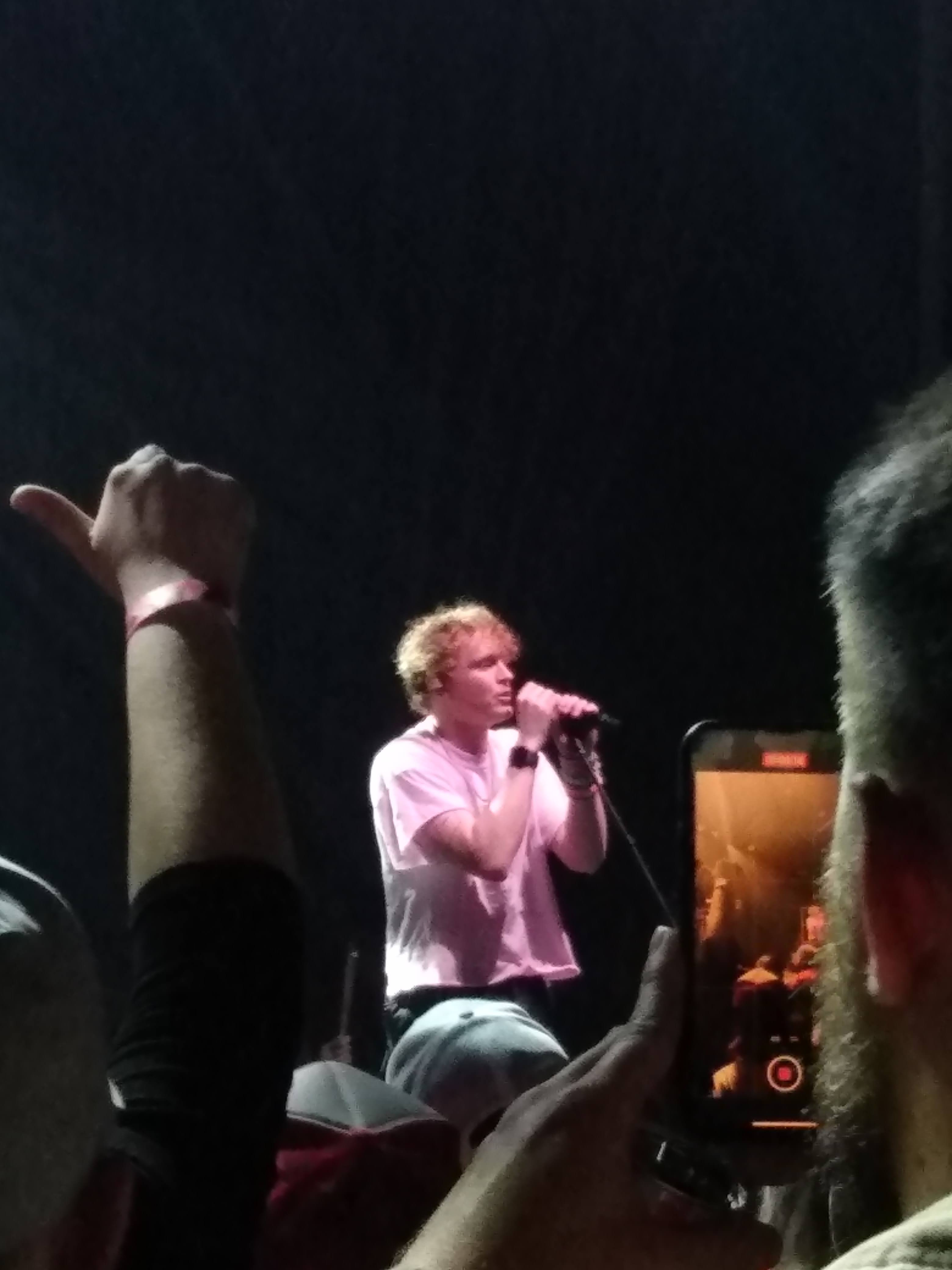
- Knox performing at Brooklyn Bowl in November 2023 in Nashville.

Background information
- Born: Knox Morris
- Origin: Dayton, Ohio, United States
- Genres: Pop rock; indie pop; alternative rock
- Occupations: Singer; songwriter; musician
- Years active: 2021–present
- Labels: Barbershop; Atlantic
- Website: www.musicbyknox.com

Knox Morris, known mononymously as Knox, is an American pop singer and songwriter. Originally from New Carlisle, OH he is now based in Nashville. He is signed to Atlantic Records.

== Career ==
With plans to become a teacher, Morris attended Ohio University. While he was a student there, he engaged in open mic nights near his hometown of Dayton, Ohio. This early stage of his career saw him performing at local events, including his cousin's wedding, and writing songs during his holiday breaks. Morris has stated that his early inspiration came from singer-songwriters, including Ed Sheeran and James Arthur.

His first major step into the music industry came with auditions for talent shows. Morris attended auditions for American Idol in various cities, including Columbus, Atlanta, and Louisville, where he performed in front of celebrity hosts. He also auditioned for America's Got Talent, though he did not progress past the audition stage.

Following his appearances on these platforms, Morris connected with Zodlounge, a music production company in Nashville. This connection led to significant advancements in his career, including dropping out of university and relocating to Nashville, Tennessee, to pursue music full-time. Morris collaborated with producers at Zodlounge to facilitate the creation of his early music. In 2020, Morris signed a co-management deal with Redline Entertainment.

As he established himself in the music industry, Morris began touring with bands such as The Band Camino and Nightly. In February 2023, Morris released his first EP titled "How To Lose A Girl in 7 Songs".

Morris recognizes social media as an important factor in his growth, particularly TikTok and Instagram Reels. His singles "Sneakers" and "Not the 1975" have both gained significant attention on these platforms, accumulating over 3 million views. The singles have surpassed 28 million and 10 million streams respectively.

In September 2023, Morris announced the release of his second EP "I'm So Good At Being Alone?" for the following month. In December 2023, Morris announced that his first headline tour would take place across the United States in January and February 2024, with support from maryjo and Spencer Jordan.

In early 2024, Morris' single "Not The 1975", which is inspired by a woman comparing Morris to Matty Healy, reached positions 15, 26 and 31 on Billboard Adult Pop Airplay, Pop Airplay and Alternative Airplay charts respectively.

On August 4, 2024, Morris performed at Lollapalooza in Chicago on one of the main stages. In January 2025, he announced that his debut album, "Going, Going, Gone", will be released in April 2025, with another headline tour to follow.

== Discography ==
Knox discography
- Studio albums: 2
- EPs: 2
- Singles: 21

=== Studio albums ===
List of studio albums, with release date and label shown
Title	Details
Going, Going, Gone	Released: April 4, 2025; Label: Barbershop Records, Atlantic; Track listing: 1. "Now & Then"; 2. "You Happened"; 3. "Going, Going, Gone"; 4. "Pick Your Poison"; 5. "She's Not Okay"; 6. "50/50"; 7. "Happy Ever After All"; 8. "Voicemail"; 9. "A Heart Still Breaks"; 10. "The DJ"; 11. "D.N.A"; 12. "All-American Tragedy"; 13. "Oxygen Thief"; 14. "Head First" (featuring Bilmuri); 15. "Win Some, Lose Somebody"; 16. "Not the 1975"
My Midwest Best	Released: October 2, 2026; Label: Barbershop Records, Atlantic; Track listing: 1. "Go for Broke"; 2. "What Do I Know"; 3. "After the After Party"; 4. "Better Than Me"; 5. "Long Story Short"; 6. "4.3 Forty"; 7. "Mixed Feelings"; 8. "I Think You Should Leave"; 9. "Ready or Not"; 10. "Gone Missing"; 11. "Vultures"; 12. "Sad Song"

=== Extended plays ===
List of extended plays, with release date and label shown
Title	Details
How to Lose a Girl in 7 Songs	Released: February 17, 2023; Label: Barbershop Records, Atlantic; Track listing: 1. "Hate My Guts"; 2. "Time Machine"; 3. "Sneakers"; 4. "I Don't Wanna Know"; 5. "Porch Lights"; 6. "Dumpster Fire"; 7. "NYC"
I'm So Good at Being Alone?	Released: October 6, 2023; Label: Barbershop Records, Atlantic; Track listing: 1. "Man Down"; 2. "Not the 1975"; 3. "Love Letter"; 4. "Miss When You Missed Me"(featuring Nightly); 5. "Nevermind"; 6. "We're Not in Love Anymore" (featuring Charlotte Sands); 7. "I'm So Good at Being Alone

=== Singles ===
==== As lead artist ====
List of singles as lead artist, with selected chart positions, showing year released and album name
Title	Year	Peak chart positions			Album
Title	Year	US Adult Pop	US Pop	US Alt.	Album
"Cold" (with Danny G and Smittyztop)	2021	—	—	—	Non-album singles
"Leg Day" (featuring John Harvie)	2022	—	—	—	Non-album singles
"Sneakers"	2022	—	—	—	How to Lose a Girl in 7 Songs
"I Don't Wanna Know"	2022	—	—	—	How to Lose a Girl in 7 Songs
"Dumpster Fire"	2022	—	—	—	How to Lose a Girl in 7 Songs
"Time Machine"	2022	—	—	—	How to Lose a Girl in 7 Songs
"We're Not in Love Anymore" (featuring Charlotte Sands)	2023	—	—	—	I'm So Good at Being Alone?
"Love Letter"	2023	—	—	—	I'm So Good at Being Alone?
"Not the 1975"	2023	15	26	31	I'm So Good at Being Alone? and Going, Going, Gone
"Girl on the Internet"	2023	—	—	—	Non-album singles
"Here's to Us"	2024	—	—	—	Non-album singles
"Me, Myself & Your Eyes"	2024	—	—	—	Non-album singles
"Change Your Mind"	2024	—	—	—	Non-album singles
"Treadmill"	2024	—	—	—	Non-album singles
"Invisible" (solo or featuring Rosie)	2024	—	—	—	Non-album singles
"Pick Your Poison"	2025	—	—	—	Going, Going, Gone
"You Happened"	2025	—	—	—	Going, Going, Gone
"50/50"	2025	—	—	—	Going, Going, Gone
"The DJ"	2025	—	—	—	Going, Going, Gone
"Dance in the Rain" (with Said the Sky)	2025	—	—	—	Closer to the Sun
"Go for Broke"	2026	—	—	—	My Midwest Best
"Long Story Short"	2026	—	—	—	My Midwest Best
"After the After Party"	2026	—	—	—	My Midwest Best
"4.3 Forty"	2026	—	—	—	My Midwest Best
"Better Than Me"	2026	—	—	—	My Midwest Best
"—" denotes a recording that did not chart.

=== As featured artist ===
List of singles as featured artist with title, year, and album
Title	Year	Album
"Corn-Fed Yetis" (Bilmuri featuring Hardy and Knox)	2022	Goblin Hours
"Backwards" (Alexa Cappelli featuring Knox)	2023	Non-album single
"2016 Cavaliers (Ohio)" (Bilmuri featuring Knox)	2024	American Motor Sports
"Happy Hour" (Hardy featuring Knox)	2024	Quit!!
"Dead Inside" (Lew featuring Knox)	2024	Dead Inside
"Isn't It Strange" (Taylor Acorn featuring Knox)	2026	Poster Child (Deluxe)
