= Hixtape, Vol. 1 =

Mixtape by Hardy
- Released: September 13, 2019
- Genre: Country
- Label: Big Loud; Tree Vibez
- Producer: Joey Moi; Derek Wells

Hardy chronology
Where to Find Me (2019)	Hixtape, Vol. 1 (2019)	A Rock (2020)

Singles from Hixtape, Vol. 1
- 1. "One Beer" Released: February 10, 2020

Hixtape, Vol. 1 is a mixtape by American country music singer Hardy. It was released on September 13, 2019, via Big Loud Records.

== Content ==
Hixtape, Vol. 1 is a collaborative album in which Hardy performs with seventeen other country music singers. According to the singer himself, he continued to add musicians to the project after more of them had accepted his offers. Among the artists featured are Morgan Wallen, Trace Adkins, and Keith Urban. Hardy originally conceived the project as an extended play, but chose to increase it to a full album after his success in writing Blake Shelton's "God's Country" led to more artists noticing him.

== Critical reception ==
Matt Bjorke of Roughstock reviewed the album favorably, stating that: "It may never have a radio hit, but there is quality here and a lot of talented folks having a damn good time, which is what music should be about...and that makes this a winning project for the rising star and superstar songwriter."

== Track listing ==
No.	Title	Writer(s)	Featured artist(s)	Length
1.	"Boy from the South"	Hardy; Brett Tyler; Matt Dragstrem	Cole Swindell and Dustin Lynch	3:05
2.	"He Went to Jared"	Hardy; Chase McGill; Morgan Wallen	Morgan Wallen	3:33
3.	"Redneck Tendencies"	Hardy; Brian Kelley; Ernest K. Smith; Ben Stennis	Trace Adkins and Joe Diffie	2:52
4.	"Nothin' Out Here"	Hardy; Ben Hayslip; Jimmy Yeary	Thomas Rhett	3:34
5.	"My Kinda Livin'"	Hardy; Cameron Montgomery; Hunter Phelps	Hunter Phelps and Jameson Rodgers	3:19
6.	"No Place Like Hometown"	Hardy; Mark Holman; Hillary Lindsey	Keith Urban and Hillary Lindsey	4:01
7.	"Something a Lil' Stronger"	Hardy; Tyler; Bart Butler; Jake Mitchell	Mitchell Tenpenny and Jon Langston	3:17
8.	"What They Make Backroads For"	Hardy; Jordan Schmidt; Josh Thompson	Tracy Lawrence and Jake Owen	3:18
9.	"Turn You Down"	Hardy; Wallen; Ben Burgess; Jacob Durrett	Morgan Wallen and Zakk Wylde	2:35
10.	"One Beer"	Hardy; Mitchell; Lindsey	Lauren Alaina and Devin Dawson	2:53

== Charts ==
=== Weekly charts ===
Chart (2019)	Peak position
US Independent Albums (Billboard)	34
US Top Country Albums (Billboard)	35

=== Year-end charts ===
Chart (2020)	Position
US Top Country Albums (Billboard)	79
