= Music Will =

US non-profit organization

- Formerly: Little Kids Rock, Inc.
- Type: Non-profit organization
- Industry: Nonprofit, Education
- Founded: 2002
- Headquarters: Montclair, New Jersey
- Key people: David Wish, Founder; Janice Polizzotto, Interim CEO
- Revenue: 5,813,939 United States dollar (2016)
- Total assets: 6,536,327 United States dollar (2022)
- Website: musicwill.org

Music Will, formerly known as Little Kids Rock (LKR), is a nonprofit charity based in Montclair, New Jersey, that encourages and enables children to play popular music. It provides free music instruction and instruments to public school districts across the country, from kindergarten through high school. Their modern band curriculum is rooted in popular music (e.g., rock, blues, hip hop, reggae, country, funk, etc.) and their teaching methods are rooted in teaching music as a second language, with a heavy emphasis on composition and improvisation. It is the largest nonprofit music program in US public schools.

== History ==
The program dates back to 1996 when David Wish, a first grade teacher in East Palo Alto, California, began giving free guitar lessons to his students, as he was frustrated with the lack of music programming at his school. He began by teaching his students the music they wanted to play, which led to him training other teachers to do the same. He coined the term "modern band" to describe the curriculum of his music class, later publishing Modern Band Method textbooks with Hal Leonard.

In 2002, Wish started Little Kids Rock as a nonprofit organization, and in the following years, the program was extended to New York City and several other public schools districts. In September 2022, Little Kids Rock changed the organization's name to Music Will and announced a goal to reach one million more students in the next five years, and to expand to a wider variety of music styles. As of 2022, the program is in over 6,000 schools in 928 cities across 50 states. It has brought free music lessons and instruments to 1.2 million students in the US, donated more than 100,000 instruments, and trained teachers in music education.

== Supporters ==
Music Will is supported by artists including Slash, Usher, Hozier, Mavis Staples, Carlos Santana, Bonnie Raitt, John Lee Hooker, B.B. King, and Paul Simon.

Since 2011, there has been an annual benefit for Music Will, with past performers and guests including Bruce Springsteen, Billy Squier, Joan Jett, Billie Joe Armstrong, Alice Cooper, Cheap Trick, Ad-Rock, Graham Nash, Steve Miller, James Hetfield, Jack Black, Brian Wilson, Yo-Yo Ma, Lady Gaga, David Letterman, Tracy Morgan, Smokey Robinson, Kenny Loggins, and Wiz Khalifa.

In May 2015, Red Hot Chili Peppers drummer, Chad Smith, was given the "Livin' The Dream Award" at the first annual Little Kids Rock Family Jam benefit at Facebook's Menlo Park campus for his work to help expand public schoolchildren's access to music education. The benefit raised over $85,000 to help provide music education for students.

In 2019, Adidas and the Beastie Boys collaborated on a special edition sneaker, celebrating the 30th anniversary of the release of Paul's Boutique, with a portion of the proceeds benefiting Music Will.

In August of 2025, Music Will announced its new National Advisory Board composed of artists and music industry professionals including Kristin Chenoweth, Harry Miree, Tom Morello and Wyclef Jean.

== Modern Band Summit ==
Since 2011, the charity has put on the Modern Band Summit, an annual conference for professional learning for music educators. In addition to educators and administrators, past summits have included artists discussing their careers and music education, including Darryl McDaniels, Linda Perry, and Steven Van Zandt. The program has statewide adoption in Maine and New Hampshire.

== Amp Up NYC Initiative ==
Berklee College of Music and Music Will partnered with the New York City Department of Education (NYCDOE) to expand the district's Modern Band music program to an additional 60,000 students in 600 city schools. The Amp Up NYC initiative is the largest private investment to date in a city's public school music education program. The donated services and resources for this initiative are estimated at $10 million. Berklee College of Music and Music Will will contribute teacher training, modern band curriculum, and thousands of new musical instruments.
