= A Rock =

Studio album by Hardy
- Released: September 4, 2020
- Genres: Country; country rock
- Length: 42:01
- Label: Big Loud
- Producers: Joey Moi; Derek Wells; David Garcia; Jake Mitchell

Hardy chronology
Hixtape, Vol. 1 (2019)	A Rock (2020)	Hixtape, Vol. 2 (2021)

Singles from A Rock
- 1. "One Beer" Released: February 10, 2020; 2. "Give Heaven Some Hell" Released: January 25, 2021

A Rock (stylized in all caps) is the debut studio album by American country music singer Hardy, released on September 4, 2020, via Big Loud Records.

== Content ==
Joey Moi and Derek Wells produced the entire album, with co-production from David Garcia on "Where Ya At" and from Jake Mitchell on "Unapologetically Country as Hell" and the title track. The album is a followup to Hardy's EP Hixtape, Vol. 1. "One Beer", featuring Devin Dawson and Lauren Alaina, is the lead single.

== Critical reception ==
Jeff Lincoln of Country Standard Time reviewed the album favorably, complimenting Hardy's unconventional appearance for a country musician, as well as his lyrical skill and combination of country and rock influences. He concluded his review with "it's got authentic appeal, and Hardy's found the right label at Big Loud Records. Country music was always more than the hats anyhow". Zackary Kephart of Country Universe rated the album one out of five stars, stating that "he's a detailed writer, and that's why, I think, most people haven't immediately written this off as an attempt at any sort of revival of the trend itself. It's just that his details are completely unlikable". He also criticized the mixing and production of Joey Moi and Hardy's limited vocal range.

== Track listing ==
No.	Title	Writer(s)	Length
1.	"Truck"	Michael Hardy; Ben Johnson; Hunter Phelps	3:38
2.	"Boyfriend"	Hardy; Zach Abend; Andy Albert	3:39
3.	"Give Heaven Some Hell"	Hardy; Ashley Gorley; Johnson; Phelps	3:37
4.	"Boots"	Hardy; David Garcia; Hillary Lindsey	3:13
5.	"Where Ya At"	Hardy; Jessie Jo Dillon; Garcia	2:59
6.	"Ain't a Bad Day"	Hardy; Jake Mitchell; Phelps	3:22
7.	"One Beer" (featuring Lauren Alaina and Devin Dawson)	Hardy; Lindsey; Mitchell	2:53
8.	"So Close" (featuring Ashland Craft)	Hardy; Mark Holman; Lindsey	3:45
9.	"Broke Boy"	Hardy; Garcia; Brett Tyler	3:52
10.	"Hate Your Hometown"	Hardy; Garcia; Lindsey	3:28
11.	"Unapologetically Country as Hell"	Hardy; Smith Ahnquist; Nick Donley; Mitchell	3:55
12.	"A Rock"	Hardy; Ahnquist; Mitchell	3:40
Total length:			42:01

=== Notes ===
- All track titles are stylized in all caps.

== Personnel ==
Credits adapted from Tidal.

- Hardy – lead vocals
- Joey Moi – production, mixing
- Derek Wells – production
- David Garcia – production on "Where Ya At"
- Jake Mitchell – production on "Unapologetically Country as Hell" and "A Rock"
- Ted Jensen – mastering
- Andrew Mendelson – mastering
- Jeff Balding – engineering
- Ally Gecewicz – editing, studio assistance
- Elvind Nordland – editing
- Scott Cooke – editing
- Ryan Yount – engineering assistance
- Sean R. Badum – engineering assistance
- Tori Alamaze – art direction, design
- Tanner Gallagher – cover photo, photography
- Chris Hornbuckle – photography

== Charts ==
=== Weekly charts ===
Chart (2020)	Peak position
Australian Country Albums (ARIA)	20
Canadian Albums (Billboard)	34
US Independent Albums (Billboard)	4
US Billboard 200	24
US Top Country Albums (Billboard)	4

=== Year-end charts ===
Chart (2020)	Position
US Top Country Albums (Billboard)	63

Chart (2021)	Position
US Top Country Albums (Billboard)	30

Chart (2023)	Position
US Independent Albums (Billboard)	38
US Top Country Albums (Billboard)	36

== Certifications ==
Region	Certification	Certified units/sales
Canada (Music Canada)	Gold	40,000^{‡}
United States (RIAA)	Gold	500,000^{‡}
^{‡} Sales+streaming figures based on certification alone.
