= Quit!! =

Studio album by Hardy
- Released: July 12, 2024
- Genre: Country; post-grunge; nu metal
- Length: 43:09
- Label: Big Loud Rock; Mercury; Republic
- Producer: Joey Moi

Hardy chronology
| Hixtape: Vol. 3: Difftape (2024) | Quit!! (2024) | Hardy (Live from Red Rocks) (2025) |

Singles from Quit!!
- 1. "Quit!!" Released: January 12, 2024; 2. "Rockstar" Released: February 9, 2024; 3. "Psycho" Released: May 17, 2024; 4. "Jim Bob" Released: May 31, 2024; 5. "Six Feet Under (Caleigh's Song)" Released: June 7, 2024

Quit!! is the third studio album by American singer-songwriter Hardy. It was released on July 12, 2024, through Big Loud Rock. It features guest appearances from Chad Smith of the Red Hot Chili Peppers, Knox, Fred Durst, Hank Williams III, and David Allan Coe.

== Background ==
Hardy recorded Quit!! with long-time collaborator and producer Joey Moi and sees the singer-songwriter further exploring his rock-influenced sound. Alongside the announcement on May 17, 2024, the artist unveiled a cinematic set of visuals that feature him being admitted to a mental institution. The "aggressive" lead single of the same name was released on January 12. The story of the title goes back "almost a decade ago" to when Hardy found a napkin with the word "quit" on it in his tip jar after a singer-songwriter show in Nashville, Tennessee. The singer uses the "discouragement as fuel", documenting his journey from a struggling Nashville newcomer to becoming a commercially successful artist himself.

== Track listing ==
All tracks are produced by Joey Moi and co-produced by Hardy, except where noted.

Quit!! track listing
| No. | Title | Writer(s) | Producer(s) | Length |
|---|---|---|---|---|
| 1. | "Quit!!" | Michael Hardy; Jacob Durrett | Moi; Hardy^{[c]}; Durrett^{[c]} | 2:47 |
| 2. | "Rockstar" | Hardy; Durrett; Blake Pendergrass | Moi; Hardy^{[c]}; Durrett^{[c]} | 3:14 |
| 3. | "Good Girl Phase" (featuring Chad Smith) | Hardy; David Garcia; Hunter Phelps | | 3:24 |
| 4. | "I Don't Miss" | Hardy; Garcia; Phelps | | 2:33 |
| 5. | "Psycho" | Hardy; Zach Abend; Tyler Hubbard; Jaclyn Cole Miskanic | Moi; Hardy^{[c]}; Abend^{[c]} | 3:18 |
| 6. | "Happy Hour" (featuring Knox) | Hardy; Smith Ahnquist; Nick Donley; Jacob Mitchell; Cameron Montgomery; Phelps | | 2:41 |
| 7. | "Jim Bob" | Hardy; Garcia; Phelps; Cody Quistad | Moi; Hardy^{[c]}; Garcia^{[c]}; Quistad^{[c]} | 3:41 |
| 8. | "WHYBMWL" | Hardy; Ashley Gorley; Ben Johnson; Phelps | | 3:13 |
| 9. | "Time to Be Dead" | Hardy; Garcia; Hillary Lindsey | | 3:44 |
| 10. | "Soul4Sale" (featuring Fred Durst) | Hardy; Abend; Fred Durst; Ryan Hurd; Ernest Keith Smith | | 3:49 |
| 11. | "Live Forever" (featuring Hank Williams III and David Allan Coe) | Hardy; Abend; Ahnquist | | 3:54 |
| 12. | "Orphan" | Hardy; John Byron; Garcia; Pendergrass | | 3:40 |
| 13. | "Six Feet Under (Caleigh's Song)" | Hardy | | 3:11 |
| Total length: | | | | 43:09 |

Note

- ^{^[c]} signifies a co-producer

== Quit!! (Live Deluxe) ==
On July 15, 2024, Hardy released a digital variant of the Quit!! album called Quit!! (Live Deluxe). The deluxe issue of the album contains the album's original thirteen tracks plus the following eight additional live tracks, produced by Moi and Hardy's musical director Harry Miree and recorded on the QUIT!! Tour in May and June 2024.

Quit!! (Live Deluxe) additional track listing
| No. | Title | Length |
|---|---|---|
| 14. | "Quit!! (Live)" | 3:17 |
| 15. | "Rockstar (Live)" | 3:19 |
| 16. | "Good Girl Phase (Live)" | 3:35 |
| 17. | "I Don't Miss (Live)" | 3:08 |
| 18. | "Psycho (Live)" | 3:46 |
| 19. | "Happy Hour (Live)" | 2:59 |
| 20. | "Jim Bob (Live)" | 3:50 |
| 21. | "Six Feet Under (Caleigh's Song) (Live)" | 3:25 |
| Total length: | | 27:59 |

== Personnel ==
Musicians

- Hardy – lead vocals
- Derek Wells – electric guitar
- Alex Wright – keyboards (tracks 1–4, 6–8, 10)
- Jerry Roe – drums (tracks 1, 2, 4–13)
- Ilya Toshinskiy – acoustic guitar (tracks 1, 2, 4, 6, 8, 12, 13)
- Jacob Durrett – bass, electric guitar (tracks 1, 2)
- Craig Young – bass (track 1)
- Tyler Tomlinson – electric guitar (track 2)
- Wes Hightower – background vocals (tracks 3–13)
- Jimmie Lee Sloas – bass (tracks 3–13)
- Joey Moi – electric guitar (tracks 3, 5, 6, 11), programming (11)
- Bryan Sutton – acoustic guitar (tracks 3, 11), mandolin (11)
- Chad Smith – drums (track 3)
- David Garcia – programming (tracks 4, 7, 12)
- Charlie Worsham – acoustic guitar (tracks 5, 9)
- Dave Cohen – keyboards (tracks 5, 9, 12, 13)
- Zach Abend – programming (track 5)
- Knox – vocals (track 6)
- Fred Durst – vocals (track 10)
- Hank Williams III - lead and background vocals (track 11)
- David Allan Coe - lead and background vocals (track 11)
- Justin Loose - guitar (tracks 14–21)
- Harry Miree - drums and programming (tracks 14–21)
- Rhett Smith - guitar (tracks 14–21)

Technical

- Justin Shturtz – mastering
- Joey Moi – mixing
- Josh Ditty – engineering (tracks 1–5, 7, 9–13), editing (all tracks)
- Ethan Mates – engineering (track 3)
- Ryan Yount – engineering (tracks 6, 8), editing (all tracks), engineering assistance (1–5, 7, 10–13)
- Fred Durst – engineering (track 10)
- Eivind Nordland – editing
- Scott Cooke – editing
- Sean Badum – engineering assistance (tracks 1, 2, 4, 8)
- Katelyn Prieboy – engineering assistance (tracks 3, 7, 10, 11)
- Austin Brown – engineering assistance (track 5)
- Joey Stanca – engineering assistance (tracks 12, 13)

== Charts ==
=== Weekly charts ===
Weekly chart performance for Quit!!
| Chart (2024) | Peak position |
|---|---|
| Australian Country Albums (ARIA) | 21 |
| Canadian Albums (Billboard) | 69 |
| UK Album Downloads (OCC) | 86 |
| US Billboard 200 | 23 |
| US Top Rock & Alternative Albums (Billboard) | 7 |

=== Year-end charts ===
Year-end chart performance for Quit!!
| Chart (2024) | Position |
|---|---|
| Australian Country Albums (ARIA) | 91 |

== Awards and nominations ==
| Year | Association | Category | Result | Ref |
|---|---|---|---|---|
| 2025 | Canadian Country Music Association | Record Producer of the Year – Joey Moi | Won | |
