= Favorite Country Song =

2025 single by Hardy

Single by Hardy

from the album Country! Country!
- Released: April 11, 2025
- Genre: Country
- Length: 3:13
- Label: Big Loud
- Songwriters: Michael Hardy; Zach Abend; Beau Bailey; Ashley Gorley
- Producer: Joey Moi

Hardy singles chronology
"Nobody Likes Your Girlfriend" (2025)	"Favorite Country Song" (2025)	"Bottomland" (2025)

Music video
- "Favorite Country Song" on YouTube

"Favorite Country Song" is a song by American country music singer Hardy, released on April 11, 2025 as the lead single from his fourth studio album Country! Country! (2025). It was written by Hardy, Zach Abend, Beau Bailey and Ashley Gorley and produced by Joey Moi.

== Background ==
Hardy released "Favorite Country Song" alongside his song "Buck on the Wall". He stated that both songs reminded him of his deer camp, where he grew up and "became who I am".

Hardy teased the song in March 2025. On social media, he expressed frustration with the song "Nights These Days" by Nate Smith, which was teased around the same time and, as he pointed out, has a similar melody to "Favorite Country Song".

== Content ==
The song opens with Hardy listing off many country classics that he grew up with: Kenny Chesney's "Summertime", Zac Brown Band's "Chicken Fried", Merle Haggard's "Mama Tried", Alan Jackson's "Country Boy", Hank Williams Jr.'s "A Country Boy Can Survive", George Strait's "Marina del Rey", Brooks & Dunn's "My Maria", Keith Whitley's "Miami, My Amy", Craig Campbell's "Outskirts of Heaven" and Eric Church's "Sinners Like Me". He then notes that regardless of their success, the songs cannot compare with the sounds of nature and life in the countryside, which he describes for the rest of the song, starting from the chorus.

== Charts ==
Chart performance for "Favorite Country Song"
Chart (2025–2026)	Peak position
Canada Hot 100 (Billboard)	59
Canada Country (Billboard)	2
US Billboard Hot 100	38
US Country Airplay (Billboard)	1
US Hot Country Songs (Billboard)	14
