= Victoria's Secret (song) =

2022 single by Jax

Single by Jax

from the album Dear Joe,
- Released: June 30, 2022
- Genre: Pop-punk
- Length: 2:56
- Label: Atlantic
- Songwriters: Jackie Miskanic; Mark Nilan Jr; Dan Henig
- Producers: Jesse Siebenberg; Mark Nilan

Jax singles chronology
"U Love U" (2022)	"Victoria's Secret" (2022)	"Cinderella Snapped" (2023)

Lyric video
- "Victoria's Secret" on YouTube

"Victoria's Secret" is a song by American singer-songwriter Jax. It was written by Jax with Mark Nilan and Dan Henig and produced by Jesse Siebenberg and Nilan. It was released on June 30, 2022, to all streaming platforms, after being previously teased on TikTok and performed at Governors Ball Music Festival earlier that month. The song charted internationally and was included on her debut studio album, Dear Joe, (2024).

== Background ==
On June 8, Jax posted a video to social media in which she played a snippet of a new song she had written for a child she was babysitting:

Yesterday, I picked her up from the mall, because she was going to her first boy-girl pool party. Her and her friends went bikini shopping at Victoria's Secret. She literally got in the car, hysterically crying to me, because this one little brat said something to her that made me cringe. So, I wrote a song for her, because when I was her age, I had a lot of eating problems, and I wish someone would have said these things to me.

Jax also further claimed that her intention was not to single out a specific brand, but rather to highlight the overarching conversation that needed to take place about the beauty and fashion industries.

Furthermore, the song coincided with a Hulu television documentary titled Victoria's Secret: Angels and Demons that premiered on July 14, 2022. Jax stated that the timing of the release was simply a "crazy coincidence".

On August 18, 2022, Jax performed the song on Today.

== Composition ==
In it, Jax calls out Victoria's Secret and its former CEO, billionaire Leslie Wexner for profiting off women's insecurities and contributing to their negative body image, singing "I know Victoria's secret/And girl, you wouldn't believe/She's an old man who lives in Ohio/Making money off of girls like me/Cashing in on body issues/Selling skin and bones with big boobs".

== Chart performance ==
For the week ending August 6, 2022, "Victoria's Secret" debuted at number ten on Billboard's Bubbling Under Hot 100 before debuting at number 83 on the Hot 100 the following week, later rising to a peak of 35. The song also peaked at number 69 on the Australian ARIA Singles Chart, 46 on the Canadian Hot 100, 25 on the New Zealand Hot Singles chart, 33 on the UK Singles Chart, and 109 on the Global 200.

== Reception ==
The song has been praised by celebrities such as Jamie Otis, Rosie O'Donnell and Howie Mandel. On August 11, 2022, Amy Hauk, CEO of Victoria's Secret, posted a statement to the company's Instagram account, claiming that the song resonated with her and that the company had "no excuses for the past" and that she was "committed to building a community where everyone feels seen and respected". Upon seeing the post, Jax posted a video to TikTok replying that her intention was never to "take down a brand".

== Charts ==
=== Weekly charts ===
Weekly chart performance
Chart (2022–2023)	Peak position
Australia (ARIA)	69
Canada Hot 100 (Billboard)	46
Canada CHR/Top 40 (Billboard)	19
Canada Hot AC (Billboard)	15
Global 200 (Billboard)	109
Ireland (IRMA)	63
New Zealand Hot Singles (RMNZ)	25
Sweden (Sverigetopplistan)	76
UK Singles (Official Charts)	33
US Billboard Hot 100	35
US Adult Contemporary (Billboard)	15
US Adult Pop Airplay (Billboard)	2
US Dance Airplay (Billboard)	27
US Pop Airplay (Billboard)	11

=== Year-end charts ===
Year-end chart performance
Chart (2022)	Position
US Adult Top 40 (Billboard)	43
US Digital Song Sales (Billboard)	53

Chart (2023)	Position
US Adult Contemporary (Billboard)	38
US Adult Top 40 (Billboard)	17
US Mainstream Top 40 (Billboard)	42
US Radio Songs (Billboard)	49

== Certifications ==
Certifications and sales
Region	Certification	Certified units/sales
Canada (Music Canada)	Gold	40,000^{‡}
New Zealand (RMNZ)	Gold	15,000^{‡}
United Kingdom (BPI)	Gold	400,000^{‡}
United States (RIAA)	Platinum	1,000,000^{‡}
^{‡} Sales+streaming figures based on certification alone.
