= Troy Cartwright =

American country music singer-songwriter (born 1990)

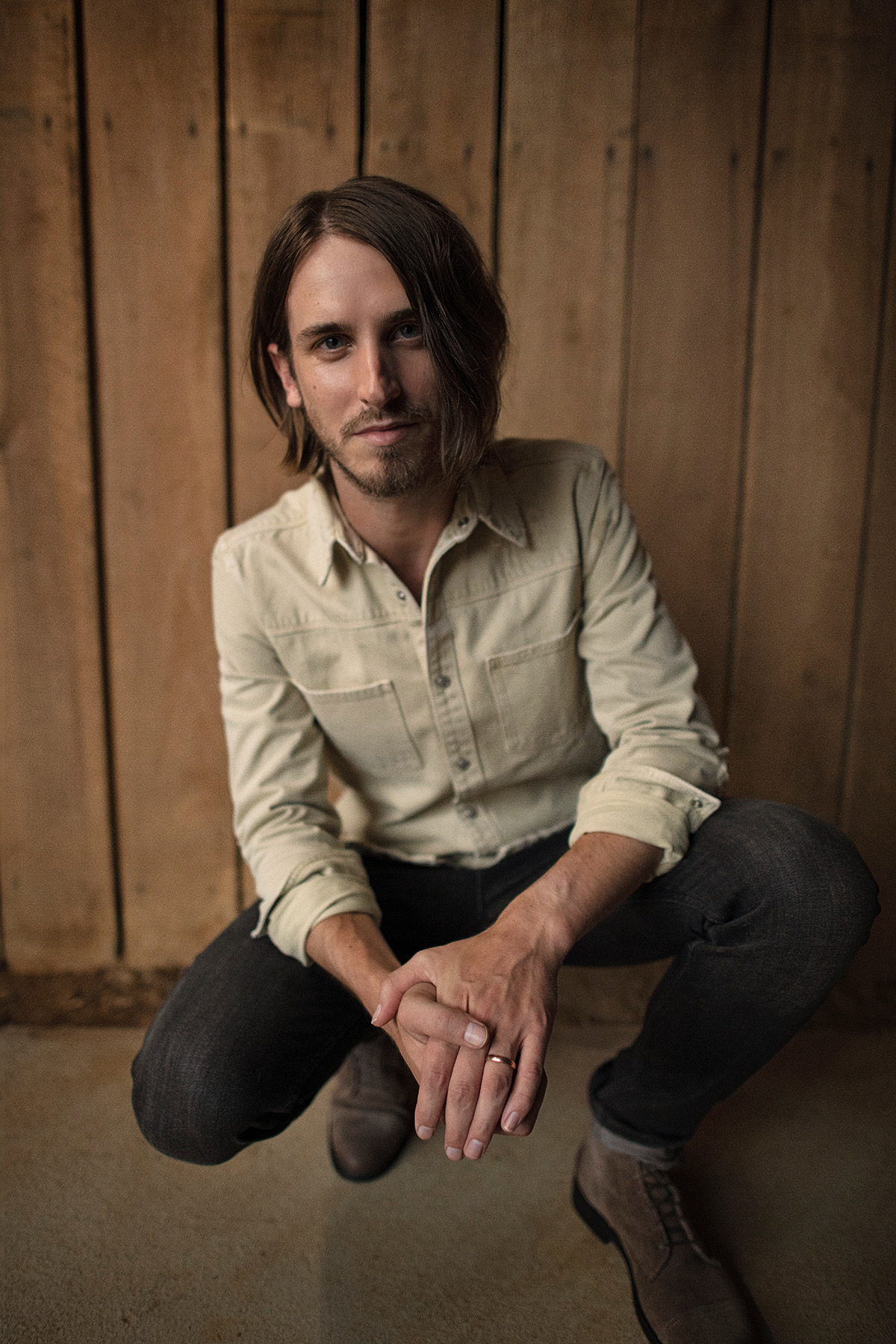

Background information
- Origin: Dallas, Texas
- Genres: Singer-songwriter, Country, Texas country music, Americana (music)
- Years active: 2013–present
- Label: Warner Music Nashville
- Website: www.troycartwright.com

Troy Cartwright is an American country music singer-songwriter.

== Life and career ==
=== Early life ===
Cartwright grew up in Dallas, Texas where he was given a guitar for his twelfth birthday and started penning his own songs shortly thereafter. By the time he hit high school, he was regularly playing in bars and local venues in town. A summer program at New York University exposed Cartwright to the world outside of Dallas and inspired him to head even further from home to attend the Berklee College of Music in Boston, Massachusetts where he studied music business and songwriting. During college, he worked odd jobs in the music industry, including a stint as a wedding singer. Upon graduating in 2012, Cartwright moved back to Texas to pursue his own music career.

=== 2013–2015 ===
Soon after returning to Dallas, Texas, he recorded an EP, Bull Run, earning him recognition at the 2013 B. W. Stevenson Songwriting Competition. The following year, he was the recipient of the 2014 Rising Star Texas Music Award. A performance with John Fullbright led Cartwright to Oklahoma, where he collaborated with producer Wes Sharon on his 2015 self-titled full-length debut.

=== 2016–present ===
Radio play coupled with extensive touring caught the ear of fellow Texas songwriter Rob Baird, who offered to co-produce Cartwright's latest release, an EP titled 'Don't Fade', with Brian Douglas Phillips at Phillip's Austin-based Rattle Trap Studio, which released October 7, 2016. The new project played a part in helping him land an agency deal with William Morris Endeavor (WME). 'Don't Fade' also garnered Cartwright debuts on numerous Billboard music charts – No. 60 on the US Country Chart, No. 53 on the US Heatseekers Chart, and No. 8 on the Heatseekers South Central Chart.

In early 2017, Rolling Stone named Cartwright one of "10 New Country Artists You Need to Know." Shortly thereafter, Cartwright moved to Nashville full-time to be closer to the songwriter community. Later that year, he signed a worldwide publishing deal with Warner/Chappell Music, the music publishing arm of Warner Music Group, and signed with Red Light Management. By June 2018, Warner Music Nashville announced that it had signed Cartwright to its label as a country music recording artist and songwriter. Later that year, Cartwright began working with Grammy Award-winning producer David Garcia on his next project.

In Summer of 2019, Cartwright released his first music through Warner Music Nashville with Love Like We Used To and Hung Up On You. SiriusXM The Highway selected Love Like We Used To as its "YouTube Country Spotlight" and added the song to its "On The Horizon" programming. In Fall of 2019, My First Beer was released, and Cartwright's latest release, Cake For Breakfast, was featured on Billboard's "First Country," as one of the best new country songs of the week. Cartwright is currently releasing music and playing live shows across the country.

Cartwright has shared the stage and toured with several notable acts including Nitty Gritty Dirt Band, Green River Ordinance (band), Turnpike Troubadours, Randy Rogers Band, William Clark Green, Rob Baird, Stoney LaRue, Wade Bowen, Sean McConnell, Cody Jinks and more.

== Discography ==
=== Studio albums ===
Title	Album details	Peak chart positions			
Title	Album details	US	US Country	US Heat	US Heat S.C.
Troy Cartwright	Released: February 3, 2015; Label: Independent	–	—	—	—
"—" denotes releases that did not chart.

=== EPs ===
Title	Album details	Peak chart positions			
Title	Album details	US	US Country	US Heat	US Heat S.C.
Bull Run	Released: June 11, 2013; Label: Independent	–	—	—	—
Don't Fade	Released: October 7, 2016; Label: Hard Luck Recording Co.	–	60	53	8
"—" denotes releases that did not chart.

=== Singles ===
- 2015: "Next Flight Home"
- 2016: "Busted"
- 2017: "Somebody Else's Problem"
- 2020: "Hung up on you"
