= God's Country (Blake Shelton song) =

Single by Blake Shelton

from the album Fully Loaded: God's Country
- Released: March 29, 2019
- Genre: Country; Southern rock
- Length: 3:25
- Label: Warner Bros. Nashville
- Songwriters: Devin Dawson; Jordan Schmidt; Michael Hardy
- Producer: Scott Hendricks

Blake Shelton singles chronology
| "Turnin' Me On" (2018) | "God's Country" (2019) | "Dive Bar" (2019) |

"God's Country" is a song by American country music singer Blake Shelton. It was released on March 29, 2019, as the first single and partial title track from his compilation album Fully Loaded: God's Country. The song was written by Devin Dawson, Jordan Schmidt, and Michael Hardy.

== Background and recording ==
The song has been described as a Southern rock anthem. Dawson stated that he and his fellows wrote the song on a Thursday, and that "Blake heard it, and by Monday he had recorded it". Shelton first heard the song while working on his farm in Oklahoma, and was blown away by the song. He related "I had to stop and just listen to this song, because the song was talking to me about a place that I was in at that moment, which was a place in the middle of nowhere that meant something to me that probably nobody else could ever understand, what that is and what it is inside of me and what my connection is to the land". He recalled thinking "'I've gotta record this song', and I think I even decided before I even recorded it, 'This has got to be the song that I put out next'".

Shelton performed the song at the 54th Academy of Country Music Awards.

== Music credits modernization ==
The production process for "God's Country" was a flagship for digital music credit-delivery. The music credits on the release were collected digitally during the recording process using the Sound Credit platform and delivered to Warner Music Nashville in a standardized digital format called Recording Information Notification (RIN). The credits were then delivered to streaming platforms such as Pandora, marking a milestone of end-to-end digital music credits.

== Content ==
Shelton has stated that "'God's Country' is a song that has a strong and deep meaningful lyric, but at the same time it leaves it up to the listeners' interpretation".

He went on to state that "But no matter where you are from or where you're standing it is my belief that you're standing in God's Country. It's really about a state of mind. Wherever you're from and how you feel about that place. For me, it's about being from Oklahoma – where I was born, raised and still live today".

== Commercial performance ==
"God's Country" was the best-selling country song in its first full week of sales, with 32,000 sold. Shelton performed the song at the 2019 ACM Awards the following week on April 7, which helped to keep sales up at 33,000 that week. It reached No. 1 on Billboard's Hot Country Songs chart dated May 25, 2019, his 14th on the chart and his first since "Sure Be Cool If You Did" in 2013. The song was certified Gold by the RIAA on June 27, 2019, and Platinum on July 31, 2019. It has sold 540,000 copies in the United States as of March 2020.

== Music video ==
The music video was directed by Sophie Muller, and shot over the course of four days in and around Tishomingo, Oklahoma. It depicts Shelton singing and working on a modern farm, interspersed with historical footage of the Dust Bowl, storms, beautiful nature shots, and traditional rural and farm imagery, concluding with a burning tractor. The video is intended to convey the intensity of farm life, while juxtaposing the "good, beautiful things of God's country, and also the wrath of God".

== Awards ==
"God's Country" won in the category of Single of the Year at the 2019 Country Music Association (CMA) Awards. Shelton received his 9th Grammy nomination for "God's Country" at the 2020 Grammy Awards in the Best Country Solo Performance category. "God's Country" won in the category of Single of the Year at the 2020 Academy of Country Music (ACM) Awards.

== Charts ==
=== Weekly charts ===
Weekly chart performance for "God's Country"
| Chart (2019) | Peak position |
|---|---|
| Australia Country (The Music Network) | 32 |
| Canada Hot 100 (Billboard) | 25 |
| Canada Country (Billboard) | 1 |
| US Billboard Hot 100 | 17 |
| US Country Airplay (Billboard) | 1 |
| US Hot Country Songs (Billboard) | 1 |
| US Rolling Stone Top 100 | 17 |

=== Year-end charts ===
2019 year-end chart performance for "God's Country"
| Chart (2019) | Position |
|---|---|
| Canada (Canadian Hot 100) | 70 |
| US Billboard Hot 100 | 53 |
| US Country Airplay (Billboard) | 19 |
| US Hot Country Songs (Billboard) | 3 |
| US Rolling Stone Top 100 | 53 |

=== Decade-end charts ===
Decade-end chart performance for "God's Country"
| Chart (2010–2019) | Position |
|---|---|
| US Hot Country Songs (Billboard) | 26 |

== Certifications ==
Certifications for "God's Country"
| Region | Certification | Certified units/sales |
|---|---|---|
| Canada (Music Canada) | Platinum | 80,000^{‡} |
| New Zealand (RMNZ) | Platinum | 30,000^{‡} |
| United States (RIAA) | 4× Platinum | 4,000,000^{‡} |
^{‡} Sales+streaming figures based on certification alone.
