= Psycho (Hardy song) =

Single by Hardy

from the album Quit!!
- Released: May 17, 2024
- Genre: Post-grunge; country rock; pop-punk
- Length: 3:18
- Label: Big Loud; Big Loud Rock; Mercury; Republic
- Songwriters: Michael Hardy; Zach Abend; Tyler Hubbard; Jaclyn Cole Miskanic
- Producers: Joey Moi; Hardy; Zach Abend

Hardy singles chronology
"Rockstar" (2024)	"Psycho" (2024)	"Jim Bob" (2024)

Music video
- "Psycho" on YouTube

"Psycho" (stylized in all caps) is a song by American country music singer Hardy. It was released on May 17, 2024, as the third single from his third studio album Quit!!. The song was written by Hardy, Zach Abend, Tyler Hubbard and Jax, and produced by Joey Moi, Hardy and Zach Abend.

== Background ==
Hardy announced a "Psycho" release date on May 13, 2024. On the day of the song's release, he revealed Quit!! would be released on July 12, 2024.

== Music video ==
The music video directed by Justin Clough and produced by Christen Pinskton and Wesley Stebbins-Perry was released on May 17, 2024. It features Hardy as a heartbroken lunatic lamenting his post-breakup woes in a straitjacket.

== Live performances ==
Five days after the release of "Psycho", Hardy performed the song and some other songs on Jimmy Kimmel Live.

Hardy performed "Psycho" wearing a straitjacket at The Tonight Show in July 2024.

== Charts ==
=== Weekly charts ===
Weekly chart performance for "Psycho"
Chart (2024)	Peak position
Canada Mainstream Rock (Billboard Canada)	28
Czech Republic Airplay (ČNS IFPI)	41
US Hot Rock & Alternative Songs (Billboard)	27
US Mainstream Rock Airplay (Billboard)	7

=== Year-end charts ===
Year-end chart performance for "Psycho"
Chart (2025)	Position
Canada Mainstream Rock (Billboard)	80
