= Jax (singer) =

American singer-songwriter

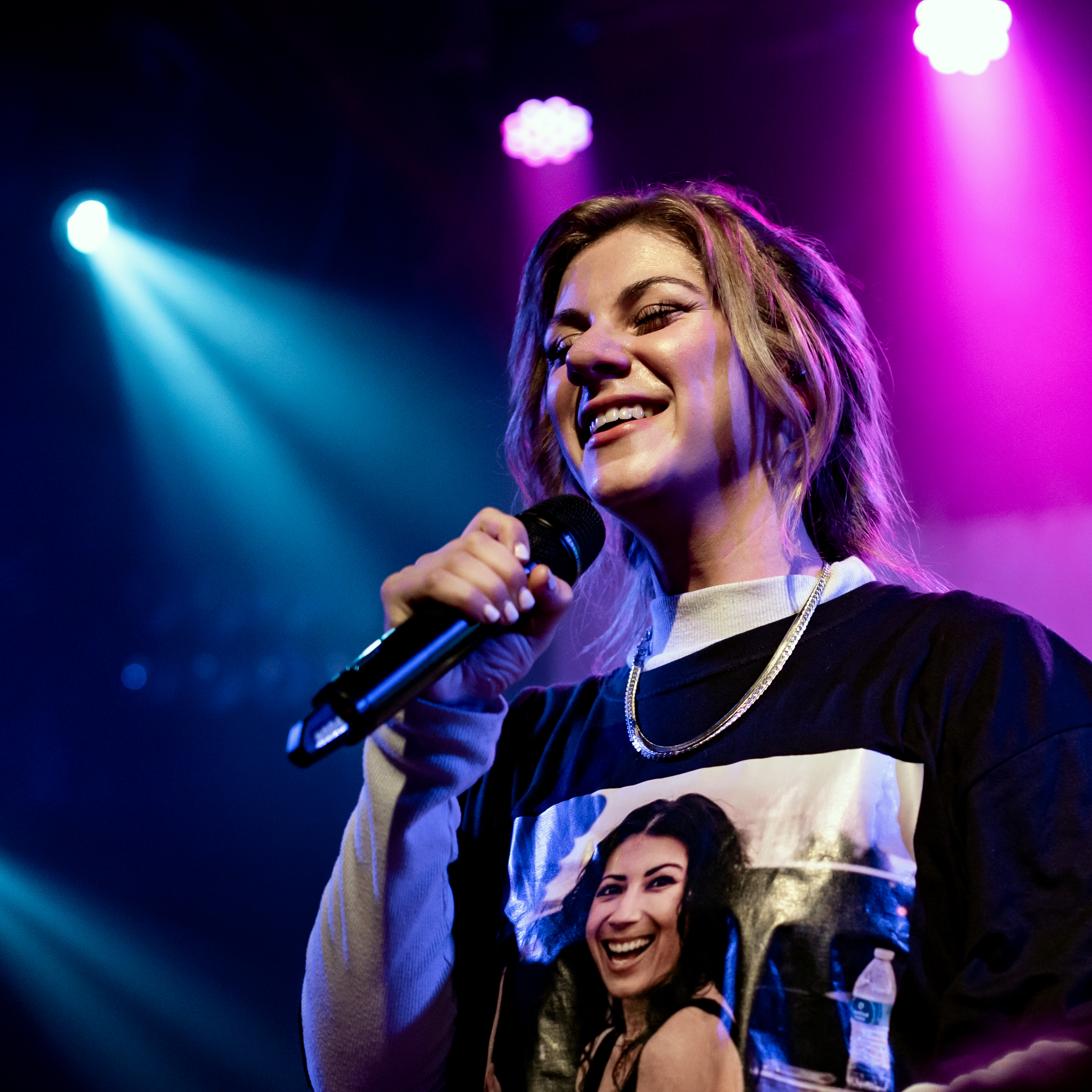
- Jax in 2022

Background information
- Born: Jaclyn Cole Miskanic; May 5, 1996 (age 30); Atlantic Beach, New York, U.S.
- Genre: Pop
- Occupations: Singer; songwriter
- Instruments: Vocals; piano
- Years active: 2015–present
- Label: Atlantic
- Spouse: Brave Gregg (m. 2023)
- Website: www.jaxwritessongs.com

Jaclyn Cole Miskanic (born May 5, 1996), known professionally as Jax (stylized as JAX), is an American singer-songwriter and social media personality, who competed on the fourteenth season of American Idol. Her 2022 single, "Victoria's Secret", reached number 35 on the Billboard Hot 100. Her debut studio album, Dear Joe, was released on Atlantic Records on June 28, 2024.

== Early life ==
Jax was born May 5, 1996, and raised in Atlantic Beach, New York, and moved with her family in 2005 to East Brunswick, New Jersey. She began singing at age 5. Her father, John, was a firefighter who was injured on duty during the September 11 attacks, and her mother, Jill, is a New York City school teacher. After attending the East Brunswick Public Schools, Jax was homeschooled starting in the eighth grade in order to allow her sufficient time for voice lessons, performances, and recording.

In mid-2014, she studied at New York University in London, where she won a John Lennon Scholarship in songwriting through the BMI Foundation. She earned a bachelor's degree from the Fashion Institute of Technology.

== Career ==
=== American Idol ===
In 2015, Jax auditioned for the fourteenth season of American Idol, with the song "I Want to Hold Your Hand" by The Beatles. She sang "Toxic" by Britney Spears for her first solo audition during Hollywood Week, and sang The Beatles' "Let It Be" for her final solo performance. She was the only contestant out of 80 to be declared safe immediately after the performance. She performed Janis Joplin's "Piece of My Heart" with Steven Tyler during the show's season finale. Jax finished third in the competition, and her first single, "Forcefield", was released following the finale. In July 2015, Jax and the other top five American Idol contestants embarked on the American Idols LIVE! Tour 2015.

==== Performances ====
Week	Theme	Song(s)	Original artist(s)	Result
Auditions	Contestant's choice	"I Want to Hold Your Hand"	The Beatles	Advanced
Hollywood Week	Most memorable auditions; Selected to Perform	"Toxic"	Britney Spears	Advanced
Hollywood Week	Hollywood round	N/a	N/a	Advanced
Hollywood Week	Group Round	"Drive By" with Alexis Glanville, Sal Valentinetti, Kelley Kime and Monica	Train	Advanced
Hollywood Week	Solo round	"Let It Be"	The Beatles	Advanced
House of Blues (Top 48)	Contestant's choice	"You and I"	Lady Gaga	Advanced
Top 24	Contestant's choice	"Bang Bang (My Baby Shot Me Down)"	Cher	Safe
Top 16	Music of Motown	"Ain't No Mountain High Enough"	Marvin Gaye & Tammi Terrell	Safe
Top 12	"Back to the Start"	"I Want to Hold Your Hand"	The Beatles	Safe
Top 11	Party Songs	"Blank Space"	Taylor Swift	Safe
Top 11 (Redux)	Songs from the Movies	"Grow Old with You" from The Wedding Singer	Adam Sandler	Safe
Top 9	Songs from the 1980s	"You Give Love a Bad Name"	Bon Jovi	Safe
Top 8	Kelly Clarkson	"Beautiful Disaster"	Kelly Clarkson	Safe
Top 7	Billboard Hot 100	"Poker Face"	Lady Gaga	Safe
Top 6	American Classics	"Piece of My Heart" "Beat It"	Janis Joplin; Michael Jackson	Safe
Top 5	Arena Anthems	"Are You Gonna Be My Girl" "White Flag"	Jet; Dido	Safe
Top 4	Judges' Hometown; Contestant's own soul	"Empire State of Mind" "Human"	Alicia Keys; Christina Perri	Safe
Top 3	Scott Borchetta's Choice; Judges' Choice; Hometown's Choice	"My Generation" "My Immortal" "Misery Business"	The Who; Evanescence; Paramore	Eliminated

=== Funny and Dear Joe, ===
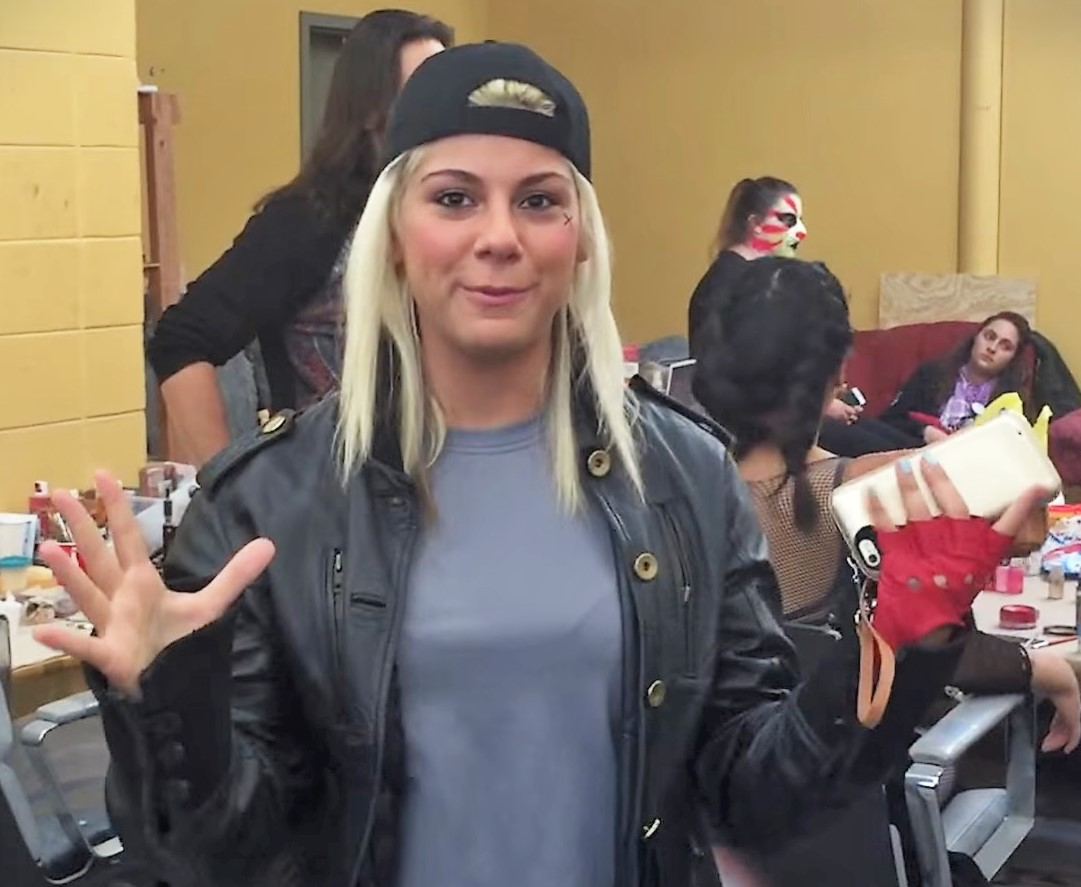
Jax speaks to NJ 101.5 radio in 2015

Jax's second single, "La La Land", was released on January 6, 2016, along with her first music video. "La La Land" is about Jax's experience on American Idol.

In 2017 she released the EP, Funny, which charted at number 17 on the Billboard Heatseekers Albums.

In 2018, Jax was invited to perform at the White House's Independence Day celebration. This caused some controversy, due to the feelings surrounding Trump's presidency at the time. Jax then appeared on Fox and Friends to defend her decision to perform at the White House, calling the criticism "vulgarity" and "bullying" rather than political commentary. She continued to explain "I come from a really patriotic family" and that she was intent on honoring the troops during this celebration without listening to the "pettiness" coming from public forums.

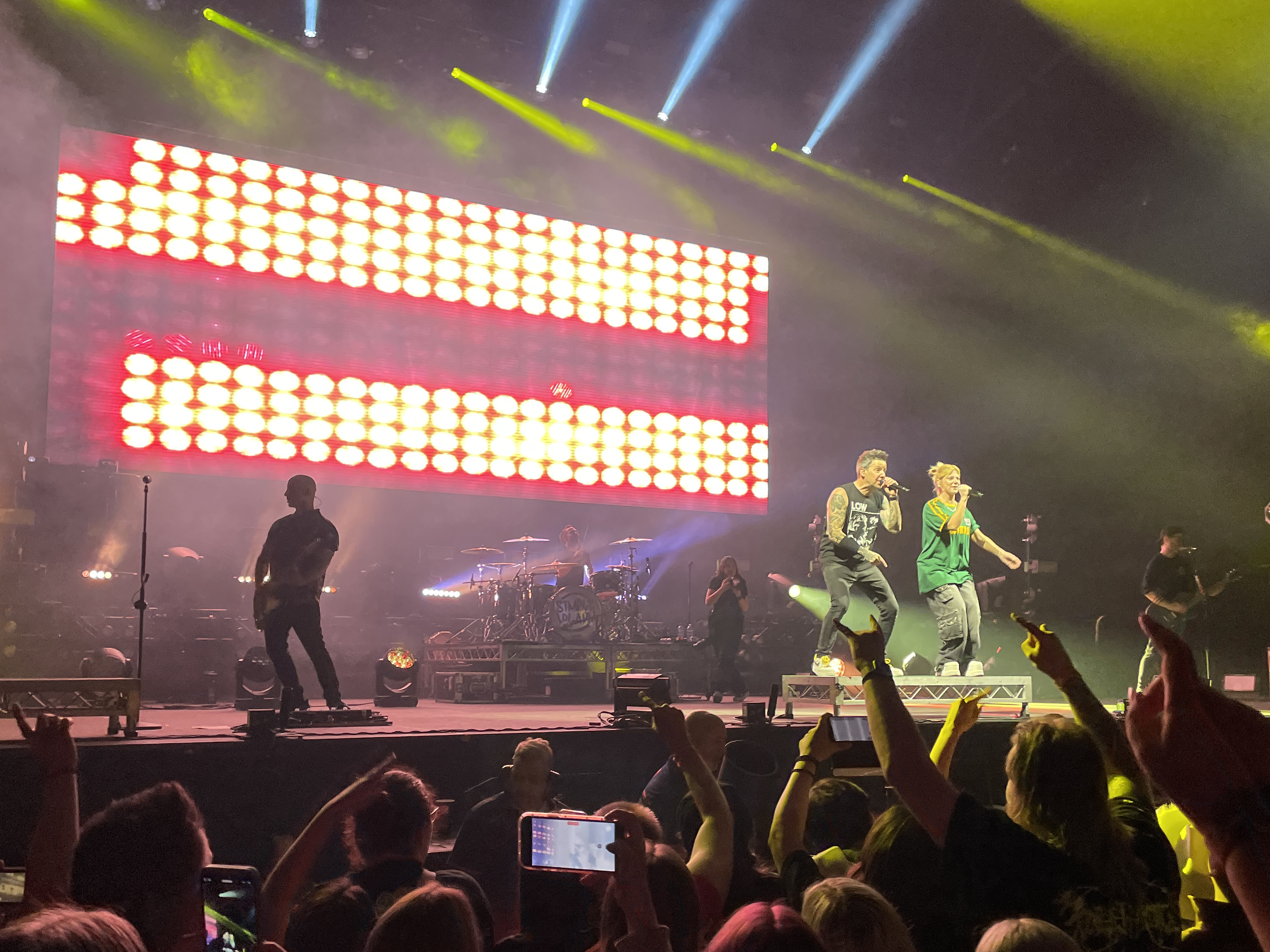
JAX performing 'Iconic' with Simple Plan (John Cain Arena, Melbourne, 2024)

In January 2021, she signed a record deal with Atlantic Records. In October 2021, her single "Like My Father" debuted at number 38 on the Billboard Adult Pop Airplay, her first song to chart on Billboard's charts. The song reached 80 million streams on TikTok.

In April 2022, Jax was named iHeartRadio's first-ever TikTok Songwriter of the Year. That year, she released the single "Victoria's Secret." It charted at number 35 on the Billboard Hot 100, number 15 on the Adult Contemporary chart, number two on the Spotify US Viral 50, and was certified Gold in the United States. It also charted in Australia, Ireland, Canada, Sweden, and New Zealand. The song was inspired by a girl Jax was babysitting, to write a song about body positivity that could inspire young girls. In an Instagram post, Victoria's Secret CEO Amy Hauk thanked Jax for "addressing important issues in her lyrics." Jax performed on the 2022 iHeartRadio Jingle Ball tour.

Her next single, "Cinderella Snapped", peaked at number 23 on the Billboard Pop Airplay chart. In October 2023, Jax joined Canadian rock band Simple Plan for a re-recorded version of the track "Iconic" from their 2022 album Harder Than It Looks. In 2024, Jax joined Simple Plan on their Australian tour. On June 28, 2024, she released her debut studio album Dear Joe, on Atlantic Records. It reached number nine9 on the Billboard Heatseekers Albums chart, and number nine on Spotify's US Albums chart.

On July 23, 2024, Jax released a series of TikTok videos with Haliey Welch. Jax has 14.5 million followers on TikTok. In October 2024, through Musicians on Call and Hyundai Hope on Wheels, Jax teamed with Sam Hollander to write the song "Hope Lights the Way" in honor of Childhood Cancer Awareness Month.

== Personal life ==
In August 2016, Jax revealed that she was battling thyroid cancer.

Jax married Braverijah "Brave" Gregg in November 2023, in Scottsdale, Arizona, in a ceremony officiated by her brother Matthew. Their daughter Charlie was born in May 2025.

== Discography ==
=== Studio albums ===
List of albums
Title	Details
Dear Joe,	Released: June 28, 2024; Label: Atlantic; Formats: Digital download, streaming
Diary of a Newborn Mother	Released: October 16, 2026; Label: STEM; Formats: Streaming

=== Extended plays ===
List of extended plays
Title	Details
Funny	Released: January 27, 2017; Label: Independent; Formats: Digital download, streaming

=== Singles ===
==== As lead artist ====
List of singles as lead artist, with selected chart positions, showing year released, certifications, and album name
Title	Year	Peak chart positions								Certifications	Album
Title	Year	US	US Adult	US Pop	AUS	CAN	NZ Hot	UK	WW	Certifications	Album
"Forcefield"	2015	—	—	—	—	—	—	—	—		American Idol Top 3 Season 14
"La La Land"	2016	—	—	—	—	—	—	—	—		Non-album singles
"Come Home to Me"	2020	—	—	—	—	—	—	—	—		Non-album singles
"I Can't Believe I Shaved My Legs for This"	2020	—	—	—	—	—	—	—	—		Non-album singles
"Papercuts"	2020	—	—	—	—	—	—	—	—		Non-album singles
"90s Kids"	2021	—	—	—	—	—	—	—	—	RIAA: Gold	Non-album singles
"Like My Father"	2021	—	33	—	—	—	—	—	—	RIAA: Gold	Dear Joe,
"I Feel Like a Kid Again"	2021	—	—	—	—	—	—	—	—		Non-album singles
"To All the Boys I've Loved Before"	2022	—	—	—	—	—	—	—	—		Non-album singles
"U Love U" (featuring Jvke)	2022	—	—	—	—	—	—	—	—		Non-album singles
"Victoria's Secret"	2022	35	2	11	69	46	25	33	109	RIAA: Platinum; BPI: Gold; MC: Gold; RMNZ: Gold	Dear Joe,
"Cinderella Snapped"	2023	— (Note: "Cinderella Snapped" did not make the Billboard Hot 100, but reached number 32 on the Digital Song Sales.)	25	23	—	—	—	—	—		Non-album single
"Zombieland" (featuring Hardy)	2024	—	—	—	—	—	—	—	—		Dear Joe,
"—" denotes a recording that did not chart or was not released in that territory.

==== As featured artist ====
List of singles as featured artist, showing year released and album name
Title	Year	Album
"Iconic" (Simple Plan featuring Jax)	2023	Non-album single

=== Other charted songs ===
List of other charted songs, showing year released, chart positions, and originating album
Title	Year	Peak chart positions	Album
Title	Year	UK Sales	Album
"Too Young to Be Old"	2024	75	Dear, Joe

=== Writing credits ===
Year	Song	Artist	Album
2019	"B.F.A. (Best Friend's Ass)"	Paris Hilton and Dimitri Vegas & Like Mike	Non-album single
2021	"BDE"	Big Freedia feat. Jax and Marc Rebillet	Big Diva Energy
2022	"A Little Bit of Love"	Weezer	SZNZ: Spring
2023	"Scam Likely"	Jes Hudak	Non-album single
2024	"Psycho"	Hardy	Quit!!

== Awards and nominations ==
Awards	Year	Nominee	Category	Result	Ref.
IHeartRadio Music Awards	2022	Herself	Social Star Award	Nominated	
IHeartRadio Music Awards	2022	Herself	TikTok Songwriter of the Year	Won	
IHeartRadio Music Awards	2023	Herself	Best New Pop Artist	Won	
