= Quit!! (song) =

Single by Hardy

from the album Quit!!
- Released: January 12, 2024
- Genre: Rap rock; nu metal
- Length: 2:46
- Label: Big Loud; Big Loud Rock
- Songwriters: Michael Hardy; Jacob Durrett
- Producers: Joey Moi; Hardy; Jacob Durrett

Hardy singles chronology
"Sold Out" (2023)	"Quit!!" (2024)	"Rockstar" (2024)

Music video
- "Quit!!" on YouTube

"Quit!!" (stylized in all caps) is a song by American country music singer Hardy. It was released on January 12, 2024, as the first single and title track from his album of the same name.

== Background and content ==
The title comes from a napkin Hardy found after a show with the word "quit!" on it in Nashville, Tennessee. He used that discouragement as fuel, then coming into his own as an artist. In a speech at the Academy of Country Music, he said:

Thank you for inspiring me to be great, I guess sometimes holding a grudge is a good thing.

On the same day of the song release, Hardy announced Quit!! tour to promote the song. Tickets for the tour went on sale on January 16.

The song expresses Hardy's own career. He recalls his first taste of success with Morgan Wallen and Florida Georgia Line's "Up Down", which has cemented his current status as a hitmaker in a wide range of genres.

== Critical reception ==
"Quit!!" received mixed reviews. Entertainment Focus writer James Daykin described that the song "is pure Eminem with its early 00s rapping and aggressive cadence". Madeleine O’Connell of Country Now felt that it "continue to push the boundaries on his genre-less catalog".

== Charts ==
Weekly chart performance for "Quit!!"
Chart (2024)	Peak position
US Hot Rock & Alternative Songs (Billboard)	32
