= One Beer (Hardy song) =

Single by Hardy featuring Lauren Alaina and Devin Dawson

from the album Hixtape, Vol. 1 and A Rock
- Released: February 10, 2020
- Genre: Country
- Length: 2:53
- Label: Big Loud
- Songwriters: Hillary Lindsey; Jake Mitchell; Michael Hardy
- Producers: Joey Moi; Derek Wells

Hardy singles chronology
"Rednecker" (2019)	"One Beer" (2020)	"Some Things Never Change" (2020)

Lauren Alaina singles chronology
"Getting Good" (2019)	"One Beer" (2020)	"Getting Over Him" (2021)

Devin Dawson singles chronology
"Dark Horse" (2018)	"One Beer" (2020)

Music video
- "One Beer" on YouTube

"One Beer" (stylized in all caps) is a song recorded by American country music singer Hardy, featuring Lauren Alaina and Devin Dawson. It was included on Hardy's first mixtape, Hixtape, Vol. 1, in 2019 and released as the first single from Hardy's debut studio album, A Rock, released in 2020. The song was written by Hardy, along with Hillary Lindsey and Jake Mitchell.

== Content ==
"One Beer" tells a story about how just a single Bud Light led to an out-of-wedlock pregnancy and a shotgun marriage. Though the twist of fate resulted in the shelving of life plans, there is the ultimate blessing of a happy family of three.

== Music video ==
The official video was uploaded on February 7, 2020. It's the storyline of a couple that welcomes a baby at a young age. The video follows the baby into his childhood years, to his teenage years, and eventually his adult life where he fulfills his life-long dream of becoming a firefighter. Everything comes full-circle near the end of the clip when a dramatic twist finds the man back at his childhood home, which is up in flames.

== Commercial performance ==
"One Beer" reached number one on the Billboard Country Airplay chart dated December 5, 2020, becoming the first number one single for Hardy and Dawson, and the third for Alaina, who previously topped the chart twice in 2017 with "Road Less Traveled" and as featured on Kane Brown's "What Ifs". It also peaked at number four on the Hot Country Songs chart, and at number 33 on the Billboard Hot 100.

== Charts ==
=== Weekly charts ===
Chart (2019–2021)	Peak position
Australia Country Hot 50 (TMN)	1
Canada Hot 100 (Billboard)	43
Canada Country (Billboard)	1
Global 200 (Billboard)	191
US Billboard Hot 100	33
US Country Airplay (Billboard)	1
US Hot Country Songs (Billboard)	4

=== Year-end charts ===
Chart (2020)	Position
US Country Airplay (Billboard)	40
US Hot Country Songs (Billboard)	14

Chart (2021)	Position
US Hot Country Songs (Billboard)	88

== Certifications ==
Region	Certification	Certified units/sales
Canada (Music Canada)	3× Platinum	240,000^{‡}
United States (RIAA)	3× Platinum	3,000,000^{‡}
^{‡} Sales+streaming figures based on certification alone.
