= Truck Bed (song) =

Single by Hardy

from the album The Mockingbird & the Crow
- Released: May 15, 2023
- Genre: Country rock; country pop
- Length: 2:48
- Label: Big Loud; Big Loud Rock
- Songwriters: Michael Hardy; Ashley Gorley; Ben Johnson; Hunter Phelps
- Producer: Joey Moi

Hardy singles chronology
"The Mockingbird & the Crow" (2023)	"Truck Bed" (2023)	"Sold Out" (2023)

Music video
- "Truck Bed" on YouTube

"Truck Bed" is a song co-written and recorded by American singer Hardy. It was released on May 25, 2023 as the fourth single from his second studio album The Mockingbird & the Crow. The song was written by Hardy, Ashley Gorley, Ben Johnson and Hunter Phelps, and produced by Joey Moi. It is his second highest charting single in the US.

== Content ==
The song's main theme is the narrator waking up in the bed of his truck after becoming intoxicated, locked out of his house by his partner, and expressing his anger at his situation. Billy Dukes of Taste of Country wrote, "one doesn't feel Hardy's fury until the very last chorus in this song, when a full-throttled electric guitar replaces the gentler version that had been plucking along as he tells of getting blackout drunk in the front yard of his girlfriend's house". Whiskey Riff writer Brady Cox thought the song contained influences of both country and heavy metal.

== Music video ==
In July 2023, Hardy released the song's corresponding music video. The video includes cameos from John Daly, King Bach, and Taylor Lewan. This video was directed by Justin Clough.

== Charts ==
=== Weekly charts ===
Weekly chart performance for "Truck Bed"
Chart (2023–2024)	Peak position
Canada Hot 100 (Billboard)	57
Canada Country (Billboard)	2
US Billboard Hot 100	27
US Country Airplay (Billboard)	1
US Hot Country Songs (Billboard)	6

=== Year-end charts ===
2023 year-end chart performance for "Truck Bed"
Chart (2023)	Position
US Country Airplay (Billboard)	82
US Hot Country Songs (Billboard)	35

2024 year-end chart performance for "Truck Bed"
Chart (2024)	Position
US Billboard Hot 100	67
US Country Airplay (Billboard)	15
US Hot Country Songs (Billboard)	20

== Certifications ==
Certifications for "Truck Bed"
Region	Certification	Certified units/sales
United States (RIAA)	2× Platinum	2,000,000^{‡}
^{‡} Sales+streaming figures based on certification alone.
