= The Mockingbird & the Crow =

Studio album by Hardy
- Released: January 20, 2023
- Genres: Country; nu metal
- Length: 61:14
- Label: Big Loud
- Producers: Joey Moi; Derek Wells; Hardy; David Garcia; Jordan Schmidt; Ben Johnson; Andrew Wade; Jeremy McKinnon; Cody Quistad

Hardy chronology
Hixtape, Vol. 2 (2021)	The Mockingbird & the Crow (2023)	Hixtape: Vol. 3: Difftape (2024)

Singles from The Mockingbird & the Crow
- 1. "Wait in the Truck" Released: August 29, 2022; 2. "Jack" Released: October 18, 2022; 3. "The Mockingbird & the Crow" Released: January 2023; 4. "Truck Bed" Released: May 15, 2023; 5. "Sold Out" Released: May 23, 2023

The Mockingbird & the Crow (styled as the mockingbird & THE CROW) is the second studio album by American singer-songwriter Hardy. It was released on January 20, 2023, through Big Loud Records. The album features a mix of country music and hard rock music. Hardy co-wrote all seventeen songs on the project and co-produced with Joey Moi and Derek Wells. "Wait in the Truck", a duet with Lainey Wilson, is the album's first single. While receiving mixed reviews from music critics, the album debuted at number four on the US Billboard 200 with 55,000 album-equivalent units, making it Hardy's highest-charting album.

== Content ==
Hardy first announced the release of the album on October 10, 2022. He told the blog Taste of Country that he intended to include influences of both country music and rock music on the project, and that he considered the songs on the project among the best he had written. Prior to the album's release in 2023, Hardy released the lead single "Wait in the Truck", a duet with Lainey Wilson. Also released prior to the project were "Sold Out", "Truck Bed", "Here Lies Country Music", and the title track. Other tracks on the project feature vocals from Morgan Wallen and Jeremy McKinnon. Dan Hyman of Spin noted influences of both country and hard rock in the album's sound.

Bobby Moore of the blog Wide Open Country noted themes of alcohol consumption and deconstruction of country music clichés in the first half of the album's tracks, particularly in "Red" and "I in Country". Moore also thought the title track showed influences of nu metal and marked the transitional point between country and rock sounds on the album. Hardy wrote every song on the album, in addition to co-producing with Joey Moi and Derek Wells. David Garcia, Jordan Schmidt, Ben Johnson, Andrew Wade, Jeremy McKinnon, and Cody Quistad also produced individual tracks.

== Critical reception ==
Stephen Thomas Erlewine of AllMusic rated the album two stars out of five, as he thought the more country music influenced tracks on the first half sounded more like Southern rock and Kid Rock than country music, while also noting "cliché" lyrics in several tracks and comparing the more rock-influenced tracks unfavorably to nu metal.

== Track listing ==
The Mockingbird & the Crow track listing
No.	Title	Writer(s)	Length
1.	"Beer"	Michael Hardy; Ashley Gorley; Ben Johnson; Hunter Phelps	3:12
2.	"Red" (featuring Morgan Wallen)	Hardy; Rhett Akins; Ben Hayslip; Jacob Rice	3:26
3.	"Wait in the Truck" (featuring Lainey Wilson)	Hardy; Renee Blair; Phelps; Jordan Schmidt	4:38
4.	"Drink One for Me"	Hardy; David Garcia; Phelps	3:32
5.	"I in Country"	Hardy; Smith Ahnquist; Nick Donley; Jake Mitchell; Phelps	3:49
6.	"Screen"	Hardy; Jessie Jo Dillon; Matt Dragstrem; Phelps	3:48
7.	"Happy"	Hardy	3:57
8.	"Here Lies Country Music"	Hardy; Cole Taylor; Brett Tyler; Will Weatherly	3:41
9.	"The Mockingbird & the Crow"	Hardy; Schmidt; Tyler	5:06
10.	"Sold Out"	Hardy; Garcia; Phelps	3:23
11.	"Jack"	Hardy; Garcia; Hillary Lindsey	2:49
12.	"Truck Bed"	Hardy; Gorley; Johnson; Phelps	2:48
13.	".30-06"	Hardy; Cameron Montgomery; Phelps; Rich	2:21
14.	"I Ain't in the Country No More"	Hardy; Garcia; Lindsey	4:15
15.	"Radio Song" (featuring Jeremy McKinnon)	Hardy; Zach Abend; Nick Donley; McKinnon; Cody Quistad	3:08
16.	"Kill Shit Till I Die"	Hardy; Garcia; Phelps	3:25
17.	"The Redneck Song"	Hardy; Andy Albert; Donley	3:56
Total length:			61:14

Notes

- Tracks 1–8 stylized in all lowercase; track 9 stylized as "the mockingbird & THE CROW"; tracks 10–15 and 17 stylized in all caps; track 16 stylized as "KILL SH!T TILL I DIE".

== Charts ==
=== Weekly charts ===
Weekly chart performance for The Mockingbird & the Crow
Chart (2023)	Peak position
Australian Albums (ARIA)	74
Australian Country Albums (ARIA)	6
Canadian Albums (Billboard)	6
US Billboard 200	4
US Independent Albums (Billboard)	1
US Top Country Albums (Billboard)	1
US Top Hard Rock Albums (Billboard)	1
US Top Rock Albums (Billboard)	1

=== Year-end charts ===
2023 year-end chart performance for The Mockingbird & the Crow
Chart (2023)	Position
US Billboard 200	61
US Independent Albums (Billboard)	8
US Top Country Albums (Billboard)	14

2024 year-end chart performance for The Mockingbird & the Crow
Chart (2024)	Position
Australian Country Albums (ARIA)	52
US Billboard 200	116
US Top Country Albums (Billboard)	23
