= Rednecker =

Single by Hardy

from the EP This Ole Boy
- Released: March 4, 2019
- Genre: Country pop; country rock
- Length: 3:21
- Label: Big Loud
- Songwriters: Michael Hardy; Jordan Schmidt; Andy Albert
- Producers: Joey Moi; Dave Cohen

Hardy singles chronology
| "Rednecker" (2019) | "One Beer" (2020) |

Music video
- "Rednecker" on YouTube

"Rednecker" (stylized in all caps) is the debut single by American country music singer Hardy. It was released on March 4, 2019 as the lead single from his 2018 debut EP This Ole Boy.

== Background ==
In an interview with The Boot, Hardy explained the song's origin.

Jordan Schmidt and Andy [Albert] and I were sitting off in a corner, and we were laughing about something. One of the guys said, "I'm rednecker than you". We were just going on and on about something stupid and kept saying that. There's a thing with songwriters, where, if somebody says something either profound or very unique, and they say it loud enough to hear -- if you're in a room with a bunch of songwriters, you'll always catch another person looking around to see if anybody heard it. It's a really funny thing. So anyway, we kinda laughed, and then we all got real serious for a second, and we were like, "Oh s--t, we need to go write that, right now".

== Critical reception ==
Kyle's Korner panned the song, rating it a 2/10 and being heavily critical of the song's generic production and Hardy's vocals as well as its cliched lyrics, criticizing the song's attempts at humor for "not [having] enough hyperbole in the writing to stick the landing." The review also criticized the song as "the dumbest declaration of countriness I’ve ever heard, sung by the most insufferable narrator who completely fails at making the track sarcastic, fun, or worth listening to."

== Music video ==
The music video, directed by Justin Clough, was shot on a farm in Cottontown, Tennessee and features some of Hardy's songwriting collaborators: Brett Tyler, Joe Clemmons and Benjy Davis. The group was able to relax and have a fun day just being buddies and hanging out. Their day consisted of mudding, mattress surfing via his jacked-up 4x4, shooting catfish in a lake, paintballing, shotgunning Busch Lights and putting "a little more spit in (his) chaw", contest style.

== Charts ==
=== Weekly charts ===
| Chart (2019) | Peak position |
|---|---|
| Canada Country (Billboard) | 17 |
| US Bubbling Under Hot 100 (Billboard) | 18 |
| US Country Airplay (Billboard) | 26 |
| US Hot Country Songs (Billboard) | 23 |

=== Year-end charts ===
| Chart (2019) | Position |
|---|---|
| US Hot Country Songs (Billboard) | 63 |

== Certifications ==
| Region | Certification | Certified units/sales |
|---|---|---|
| Canada (Music Canada) | Platinum | 80,000^{‡} |
| United States (RIAA) | Platinum | 1,000,000^{‡} |
^{‡} Sales+streaming figures based on certification alone.
