= Give Heaven Some Hell =

Single by Hardy

from the album A Rock
- Released: January 25, 2021
- Genre: Country rock
- Length: 3:37
- Label: Big Loud
- Songwriters: Ashley Gorley; Ben Johnson; Hunter Phelps; Michael Hardy
- Producers: Joey Moi; Derek Wells

Hardy singles chronology
"Some Things Never Change" (2020)	"Give Heaven Some Hell" (2021)	"The Worst Country Song of All Time" (2021)

Music video
- "Give Heaven Some Hell" on YouTube

"Give Heaven Some Hell" (stylized in all caps) is a song by American country music singer Hardy. It was released on January 25, 2021, as the second single from his debut studio album A Rock, released in 2020. The song was co-written by Hardy, Ashley Gorley, Ben Johnson and Hunter Phelps, and produced by Joey Moi and Derek Wells.

== Content ==
"Give Heaven Some Hell" is a "stirring" tribute from Hardy to anyone who has lost a loved one. He shared: "'Give Heaven Some Hell' is one of my favorite songs I've ever written, I just hope this helps anyone that's ever suffered a loss of a loved one. Excited for this song to exist in the world".

== Music video ==
The music video was released on July 24, 2020, directed by Justin Clough. It was shot in Lynnville, Tennessee, and uses a rural church funeral for its backdrop, depicting the emotional side of losing someone while also celebrating being close to someone. Hardy co-stars with the song's writers, as well as Jameson Rodgers.

== Charts ==
=== Weekly charts ===
Weekly chart performance for "Give Heaven Some Hell"
Chart (2021–2022)	Peak position
Canada Hot 100 (Billboard)	86
Canada Country (Billboard)	8
US Billboard Hot 100	69
US Country Airplay (Billboard)	11
US Hot Country Songs (Billboard)	16

=== Year-end charts ===
2021 year-end chart performance for "Give Heaven Some Hell"
Chart (2021)	Position
US Hot Country Songs (Billboard)	77

2022 year-end chart performance for "Give Heaven Some Hell"
Chart (2022)	Position
US Country Airplay (Billboard)	45
US Hot Country Songs (Billboard)	49

== Certifications ==
Certifications for "Give Heaven Some Hell"
Region	Certification	Certified units/sales
Canada (Music Canada)	Platinum	80,000^{‡}
United States (RIAA)	2× Platinum	2,000,000^{‡}
^{‡} Sales+streaming figures based on certification alone.
