= Wait in the Truck =

Single by Hardy featuring Lainey Wilson

from the album The Mockingbird & the Crow
- Released: August 29, 2022
- Genre: Country; murder ballad
- Length: 4:38
- Label: Big Loud
- Songwriters: Michael Hardy; Hunter Phelps; Jordan Schmidt; Renee Blair
- Producers: Hardy; Joey Moi; Derek Wells; Jordan Schmidt

Hardy singles chronology
"The Worst Country Song of All Time" (2021)	"Wait in the Truck" (2022)	"Jack" (2022)

Lainey Wilson singles chronology
"Heart Like a Truck" (2022)	"Wait in the Truck" (2022)	"Save Me" (2023)

Music video
- "Wait in the Truck" on YouTube

"Wait in the Truck" (stylized in all lowercase) is a song by American country music singer Hardy featuring American country music singer Lainey Wilson. It was released on August 29, 2022, as the lead single from Hardy's second studio album The Mockingbird & the Crow. The song is a murder ballad about a male protagonist killing an abuser. It is his highest charting single in the US.

== Background and content ==
The idea for the song came from a conversation between two of its songwriters, Hardy and Hunter Phelps. When discussing what they would do if their fiancées were attacked, Hardy mentioned he would direct the attacker towards himself and then tell his fiancée to "wait in the truck". The pair then realized that "wait in the truck" was a good song title. In March 2021, they worked up the song at Jordan Schmidt's home studio, taking inspiration from the song "Ol' Red". They recorded a demo that night, with Schmidt adding an artificial siren to the end of the third verse, and his fiancée, singer-songwriter Renee Blair, providing the female vocals and adding a vamp of the phrase "have mercy". Producer Joey Moi would later re-record the primary instrumentation and add a gospel choir for the closing vamp.

Wilson cited Garth Brooks' "The Thunder Rolls" and The Chicks' "Goodbye Earl" as inspiration for her performance, and said she hoped the song "brings light to a situation that is more common than we'd like to admit" and "haunts" domestic abusers.

The song depicts a man who, upon finding a battered woman on the side of the road, confronts her abuser in his trailer, shooting him when he reaches for his shotgun, killing the abuser. The song ends with the man in prison, 60 months into a sentence.

== Music video ==
A music video was released with the song, directed by Justin Clough and produced by Taylor Vermillion and Ben Skipworth. The video follows the song, depicting a character played by Hardy killing the abuser of a character played by Wilson, as well as scenes of Wilson's character testifying in court and visiting Hardy in prison. The video was filmed in Smith County, Tennessee with Smith County Middle School acting as the prison. The video was described as "Video of the Year-worthy" by Madeleine O'Connell, writing for Country Now. The music video won Collaborative Music Video of the Year at the 2023 CMT Music Awards, and was nominated for Video of the Year.

== Charts ==
=== Weekly charts ===
Weekly chart performance
Chart (2022–2023)	Peak position
Canada Hot 100 (Billboard)	42
Canada Country (Billboard)	2
Global 200 (Billboard)	118
US Billboard Hot 100	23
US Country Airplay (Billboard)	2
US Hot Country Songs (Billboard)	5

=== Year-end charts ===
Year-end chart performance
Chart (2022)	Position
US Hot Country Songs (Billboard)	74
US Digital Song Sales (Billboard)	59

Chart (2023)	Position
US Billboard Hot 100	54
US Country Airplay (Billboard)	14
US Hot Country Songs (Billboard)	15

== Certifications ==
Region	Certification	Certified units/sales
United States (RIAA)	3× Platinum	3,000,000^{‡}
^{‡} Sales+streaming figures based on certification alone.
