= Hardy (singer) =

American country music singer (born 1990)

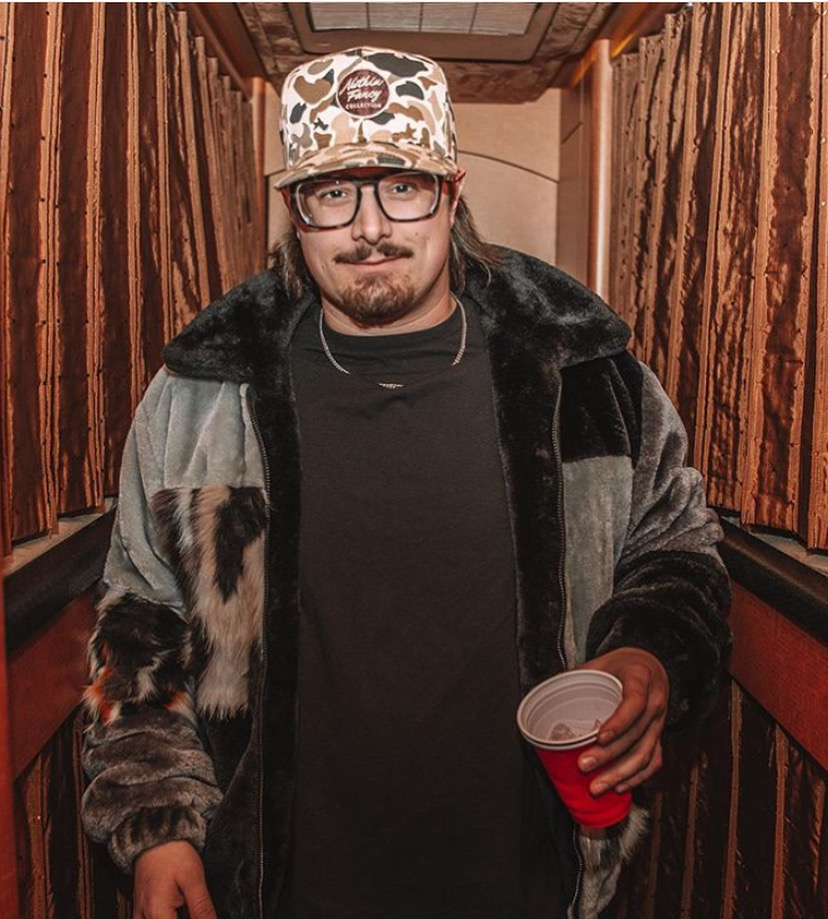
- Hardy in 2020

Background information
- Also known as: HARDY
- Born: Michael Wilson Hardy; September 13, 1990 (age 36); Philadelphia, Mississippi, U.S.
- Genres: Country; country rock; nu metal; post-grunge
- Occupations: Singer; songwriter
- Instruments: Vocals; guitar
- Years active: 2012-present
- Labels: Big Loud; Big Loud Rock; Tree Vibez
- Spouse: Caleigh Ryan (m. 2022)
- Website: hardyofficial.com

Michael Wilson Hardy (born September 13, 1990), known mononymously as Hardy (stylized in all caps as HARDY), is an American country, country rock and hard rock singer and songwriter. His music incorporates heavy metal, punk rock, soul, and hip hop elements. He has written songs for Florida Georgia Line, Chris Lane, Blake Shelton, Dallas Smith, Thomas Rhett, Morgan Wallen and Ella Langley.

Hardy has released four studio albums for Big Loud Records, A Rock (2020), The Mockingbird & the Crow (2023), Quit!! (2024), and Country! Country! (2025), as well as three collaborative mixtapes, Hixtape, Vol. 1 (2019), Hixtape, Vol. 2 (2021), and Hixtape: Vol. 3: Difftape (2024), and two EPs, This Ole boy (2018), Where to find me (2019). His singles "Give Heaven Some Hell", "One Beer", "Wait in the Truck" and "Truck Bed" charted in the US and Canada, and his album, The Mockingbird & the Crow, topped the country music charts in early 2023.

== Early life ==
Michael Wilson Hardy was born to Mike and Sarah Hardy, in Philadelphia, Mississippi. Growing up, Hardy often listened to music with his father, whom he has cited as the source of some of his earliest and fondest memories.

He attended Neshoba Central High School in Philadelphia, Mississippi. It was during that time that he wrote his first song to "impress a girl." Hardy then went on to attend Middle Tennessee State University, where he got a degree in songwriting in the Recording Industry Management program.

After graduating, Hardy took a trip to visit his sister in Nashville, which led to the start of his career. While there, he realized that it was possible to make country music into a career. Hardy met Florida Georgia Line in 2012 at a party where he was introduced to them by a mutual acquaintance. He was eventually reconnected with the group years later.

After moving to Nashville, Tennessee, to pursue songwriting, he joined CJ Solar's band on Bass, and toured the country for years in that capacity. He later became a writing partner of the duo Florida Georgia Line. Among the songs that Hardy wrote is "Up Down" (with CJ Solar) by Morgan Wallen. Following the song's success and encouragement from record producer Joey Moi, Hardy was signed to Big Loud Records in 2018.

== Career ==
=== 2018–2020: Debut EPs, Hixtape, Vol. 1, and A Rock ===
After parting ways with CJ Solar's band the year prior, in October 2018 he released an EP titled This Ole Boy, which he promoted by joining Wallen's If I Know Me Tour. This was followed in 2019 by the single "Rednecker", which became Hardy's first song to chart on the Billboard Hot Country Songs chart, peaking at 23, and a second EP titled Where to Find Me. To support the EP, Hardy joined Florida Georgia Line on their Can't Say I Ain't Country Tour.

Hardy also co-wrote Florida Georgia Line's singles "Simple" and "Talk You Out of It", Blake Shelton's singles "God's Country" and "Hell Right", "Drop" by Dallas Smith, Chris Lane's single "I Don't Know About You", and Jameson Rodgers' debut single "Some Girls".

In September 2019, Hardy released a collaborative mixtape titled Hixtape, Vol. 1, which featured a total of 17 artists including Thomas Rhett, Keith Urban, Tracy Lawrence, Jake Owen, Trace Adkins, Joe Diffie, Zakk Wylde, Cole Swindell, Dustin Lynch, and Morgan Wallen.

Hardy was set to be on tour with Thomas Rhett in 2020 for Rhett's Center Point Road Tour, but the tour was postponed due to the COVID-19 pandemic. In September 2020, Hardy released his debut album A Rock, which included his single "One Beer", originally released on Hixtape, Vol. 1, which was released a year prior. He was also featured on Dallas Smith's single "Some Things Never Change".

=== 2021–2023: Hixtape, Vol. 2 and The Mockingbird & The Crow ===
In June 2021, Hardy was featured on the Brantley Gilbert single "The Worst Country Song of All Time" and a month later was featured on Dierks Bentley's single "Beers on Me"; Hardy also co-wrote both songs.

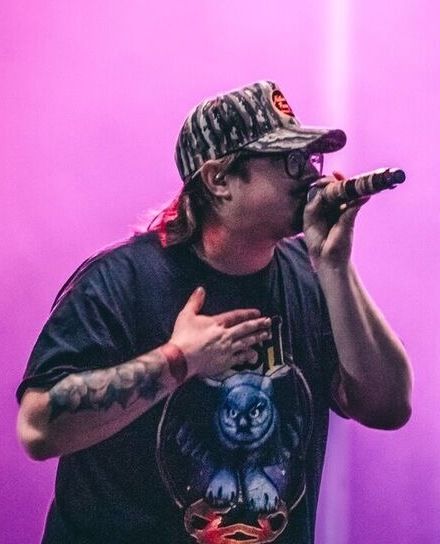
Hardy performing in 2019

Hardy released Hixtape, Vol. 2 on December 10, 2021. This album included artists such as Matt Stell, Jon Pardi, Jimmie Allen, Colt Ford, Randy Houser, Rhett Akins, and Lainey Wilson. The successor to Hixtape, Vol. 1, it was not as well received as its predecessor, and released no songs to mainstream radio.

Morgan Wallen announced his plans for his 2022 Dangerous tour, which included Hardy for almost all of the nearly 50 stops, including stops in Pennsylvania, South Carolina, Georgia, Louisiana, Oklahoma, and South Dakota.

On August 19, 2022, Hardy released "Wait in the Truck", featuring Lainey Wilson, as his first single from his upcoming second studio album. The song peaked on the US Billboard Hot 100 chart at 23. In October 2022, Hardy announced his second studio album, The Mockingbird & the Crow, to be released on January 20, 2023, via Big Loud Records with guest vocals from fellow country singers Morgan Wallen, Lainey Wilson and A Day to Remember lead singer Jeremy McKinnon. Hardy released three songs from The Mockingbird & the Crow on October 9, 2022: "Truck Bed", "Here Lies Country Music", and "The Mockingbird & the Crow". The full album features half country and half rock music. The first half of the album is more traditional country music with all the song titles stylized in lower case. The song "The Mockingbird & the Crow" features a distinct shift halfway through the song to the rock genre, and the rest of the album continues as rock and hard rock, though still using country themes and imagery in the lyrics. The rock song titles are all stylized in uppercase. Hardy also adopted the call-and-response structure and classic pirate tropes of a sea shanty on the album with the closing track "The Redneck Song."

=== 2024–2025: Quit!! and Hixtape: Vol 3: Difftape ===
On January 12, 2024, Hardy released his new single, "Quit!!" as his first single from his upcoming third studio album. "Quit!!" tells the true story about someone who put a note that said "Quit!!" in a tip jar at one of Hardy's early shows. That same day, Hardy announced that he would be embarking on the QUIT!! Tour. This tour had fifteen dates. Kip Moore, Travis Denning, Ella Langley and Stephen Wilson Jr. joined him on the road as supporting acts. A month later on February 9, Hardy released "Rockstar" as his second single from his upcoming third studio album.

In March 2024, Hardy announced his third collaborative mixtape, titled Hixtape: Vol. 3: Difftape, featuring him and other artists covering songs by Joe Diffie and honoring the fourth anniversary of his death in 2020. Unlike the previous two Hixtape installments, it is not credited solely as a Hardy album. Hardy teamed up with Nickelback to film an episode of CMT Crossroads which featured Nickelback's "Savin' Me" and "Animals". It also featured Hardy's "Truck Bed" and "Give Heaven Some Hell". They also performed a rendition of Hardy's song "Sold Out". They finished the episode with a mashup of both artists' songs titled, "Rockstar".

In April 2024, Hardy announced that in collaboration with Dr. Dre and Snoop Dogg that he had recorded a version of their 1994 song "Gin and Juice". He also announced that he had filmed a short film with them for the song. This was done to promote Dre and Snoop's Gin & Juice alcoholic beverage.

On May 17, 2024, Hardy released his third single, "Psycho" and announced that his third studio album, Quit!! would be released on July 12, 2024, via Big Loud Records and Big Loud Rock. The album features guest appearances from Chad Smith, Knox, and Limp Bizkit's Fred Durst.

In August 2024, Hardy was featured on "Hide My Gun" from Post Malone's country album, F-1 Trillion, which he also co-wrote.

=== 2025–present: Hardy (Live from Red Rocks) and Country! Country! ===
On October 14, 2024, Hardy announced via his Instagram that he would be recording both nights of his tour at Red Rocks Amphitheatre so that he could release a live album in early 2025. Hardy (Live from Red Rocks) was released on February 7, 2025. The album contains live versions of songs from his three studio albums, along with a cover of Blake Shelton's "God's Country", which Hardy co-wrote.

In February 2025, Hardy teamed up with Nate Smith for Smith's song "Nobody Likes Your Girlfriend", which charted on the Hot Country Songs chart. On March 14, 2025, Hardy partnered with Amazon Music for a new album, Hardy (Amazon Music Songline), as a part of Amazon Music's new performance series, Songline. The eight song album contains re-imagined versions of select songs from all of his studio albums, including a live performance of "Live Forever", plus a cover of The 1975's "Love It If We Made It", which was covered by Hardy back in 2024 as an Amazon Music Original.

In April 2025, Hardy announced a new EP, Country!, which released on May 2, 2025, along with the first two songs, "Favorite Country Song" and "Buck on the Wall" which were released on April 11. Hardy is also made his official debut at the Grand Ole Opry on April 29, 2025, following his unofficial debut back in 2023. In May 2025, Hardy was featured on "Come Back as a Redneck" from Morgan Wallen's fourth studio album, I'm the Problem. This marks the sixth collaboration between the two artists following "He Went to Jared", "Turn You Down", "Goin' Nowhere", "Red", and "In the Bible".

On July 30, 2025, Hardy announced his fourth studio album, Country! Country!. It was released on September 26, 2025. The next day, on August 1, Hardy released the first single from Country! Country!, "Bottomland". On August 20, 2025, Hardy teased the third track off the album, "Bro Country" featuring singer-songwriter Ernest. A few days later it was announced that "Bro Country" would be released August 29, 2025, as the next single from the album. In 2026, Hardy will embark on his headlining "Country! Country! Tour" across North America, with support from Cameron Whitcomb, Tucker Wetmore, Mitchell Tenpenny, Muscadine Bloodline, and McCoy Moore.

On January 30, 2026, Hardy released the song "McArthur" featuring an ensemble of Tim McGraw, Eric Church, Morgan Wallen, and himself. In the song, each musician impersonates a different member of the fictional McArthur family. McGraw is John McArthur, a farmer with a mule and a plow who's now just a "whisper in the wind through the pine trees.” Church portrays his son, Junior, killed in Vietnam. Hardy embodies Jones McArthur, who raises an heir more invested in money than dirt. And Wallen voices Hunter McArthur, the money-focused son haunted by second thoughts over selling the family's acreage. In the chorus, the song poses one key question: "When you pass on, what you gonna pass down?"

== Awards ==
In 2019, Hardy received his first nomination for the Country Music Association awards. Held at the Bridgestone Arena in Nashville, Tennessee, Hardy was nominated for Song of the Year for Blake Shelton's "God's Country", which Hardy co-wrote with Devin Dawson and Jordan Schmidt. He was then again nominated in the 2021 CMA Awards as New Artist of the Year.

Hardy was nominated for two awards in the 2020 Academy of Country Music Awards: Song of the Year, for Blake Shelton's "Gods Country" that Hardy co-wrote, and Songwriter of the Year. Following that, in 2021, he received three nominations: New Male Artist, Songwriter of the Year, and Music Event of the Year, for his song "One Beer" along with Lauren Alaina and Devin Dawson. Hardy was nominated for two awards in the 2022 Academy of Country Music Awards, held at the Allegiant Stadium in Las Vegas. He did not win the award for New Male Artist, losing to Parker McCollum. He was, however, named the Academy of Country Music's 2022 Songwriter of the Year, making that his first ACM Award. During the 2023 ACA Awards, Hardy was nominated for multiple awards, of which he ended up taking home three. His collaboration with Lainey Wilson won for "Best Visual Media of the Year" and "Musical Event of the Year". In addition, he ended up winning the Artist-Songwriter of the Year".

== Personal life ==
Hardy proposed to his girlfriend Caleigh Ryan in August 2021 at The Lyric in Oxford, Mississippi which is where the couple met in 2017. The two married on October 29, 2022. On March 7, 2025, their daughter was born.

== Discography ==
Studio albums

- A Rock (2020)
- The Mockingbird & the Crow (2023)
- Quit!! (2024)
- Country! Country! (2025)
