= Country pop =

Country-inspired subgenre of pop music

- Stylistic origins: Country (especially countrypolitan); pop; folk-pop; rockabilly; rock
- Cultural origins: 1960s in Nashville, Tennessee
- Derivative forms: Bro-country; Cowboy pop

Other topics
- Nashville sound; Country rock

Country pop (also known as urban cowboy when referring to the early 1980s version of the genre) is a fusion genre of country music that was developed by members of the country genre out of a desire to reach a larger, mainstream audience. Country pop music blends genres like rock, pop, and country, continuing similar efforts that began in the late 1950s, known originally as the Nashville sound and later on as Countrypolitan. By the mid-1970s, many country artists were transitioning to the pop-country sound, which led to some records charting high on the mainstream top 40 and the Billboard country chart. In turn, many pop and easy listening artists crossed over to country charts during this time. After declining in popularity during the neotraditional movement of the 1980s, country pop had a comeback in the 1990s with a sound that drew more heavily on pop rock and adult contemporary. In the 2010s, country pop metamorphosized again with the addition of hip-hop beats and rap-style phrasing.

== History ==
=== Beginnings: Nashville sound/50s-60s ===
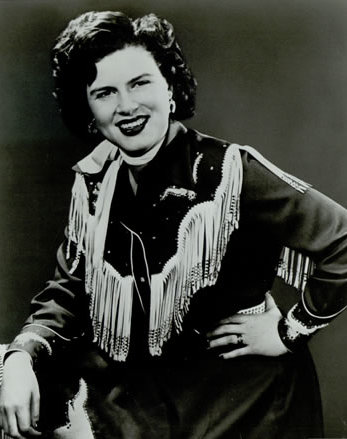
Patsy Cline was one of the earliest influential artists of the genre.

The joining of country and pop began in the 1950s when studio executives Chet Atkins and Owen Bradley wanted to create a new kind of music for the young adult crowd after "rockabilly stole away much of country music's youth audience". According to Bill Ivey, this innovative genre originated in Nashville, Tennessee and thus became known as the Nashville Sound. He believes that the "Nashville Sound often produced records that sounded more pop than country" after the removal of the fiddle and banjo. Patsy Cline, Marty Robbins, Jim Reeves, and Eddy Arnold were among the most popular artists during this time. Both Reeves and Arnold had major influence on their RCA labelmate Elvis Presley, apparent not only in secular songs but even more so in country gospel songs. Cline became famous in the early 1960s, gaining widespread acceptance from country and pop audiences alike. Other crossover hits during the 1960s included Skeeter Davis's "The End of the World", Sonny James' "Young Love", Billy Joe Royal's "Down in the Boondocks", Jeannie C. Riley's "Harper Valley PTA", and Bobby Goldsboro's "Honey". However, the Nashville Sound was not well received by country purists and faced competition on that front, first from the Bakersfield Sound and later the outlaw movement; on the pop side, the format was overshadowed by the British Invasion, which was taking place during the same time that Cline and Reeves died by airplane accident.

=== 1970s country pop ===
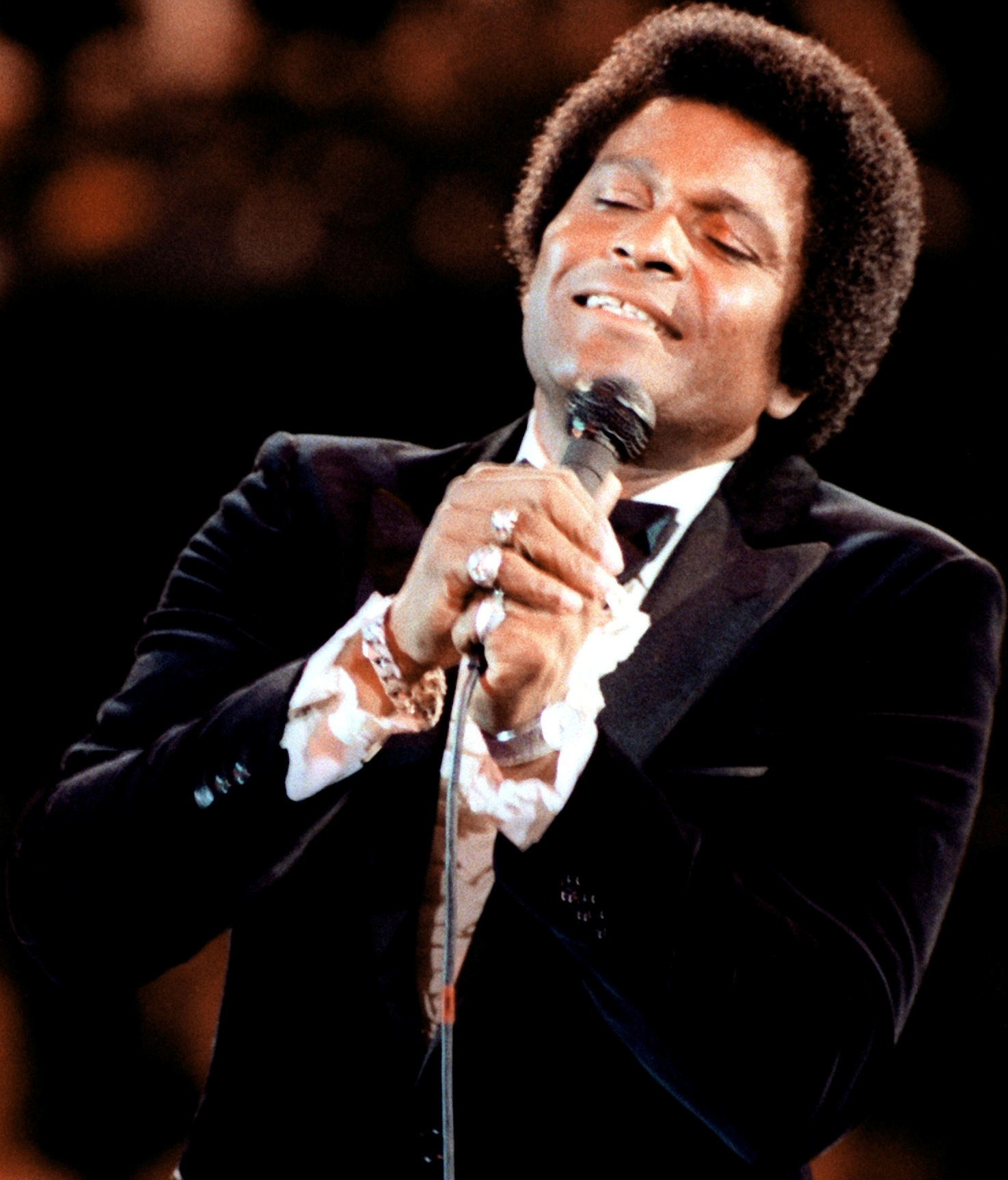
Charley Pride, one of the biggest country pop acts of the 1970s in concert

The Nashville sound eventually evolved into countrypolitan during the 1970s and had varying levels of success, with several artists recording in the style: Ray Price ("For the Good Times" 1970), Lynn Anderson ("Rose Garden" 1970), Charley Pride ("Kiss an Angel Good Morning" 1971), Mac Davis ("Baby, Don't Get Hooked on Me" 1972), Donna Fargo ("The Happiest Girl in the Whole U.S.A." 1972 and "Funny Face" 1973), Marie Osmond ("Paper Roses" 1973), Kris Kristofferson ("Why Me" 1973), Charlie Rich ("The Most Beautiful Girl" 1974), Billy Swan ("I Can Help" 1974), Ray Stevens ("The Streak" 1974), Jessi Colter ("I'm Not Lisa" 1975), and Crystal Gayle ("Don't It Make My Brown Eyes Blue" 1977) all charted pop-influenced country hits during the 1970s.

Country pop started when pop music singers like Glen Campbell, John Denver, Olivia Newton-John, and Anne Murray (Canada) began having hits on the country charts. Denver's single "Take Me Home, Country Roads" went to No. 2 on the Billboard pop charts in 1971, and while the song stalled outside of the top 40 on Billboard's country chart, the album Poems, Prayers, and Promises reached the top 10 on the Billboard Country Album chart and was certified Platinum. Denver's career flourished from then on, and he had a series of hits over the next four years. In 1972, Denver scored his first Top Ten pop album with Rocky Mountain High, with its title track reaching the pop Top Ten in 1973. At the peak of his popularity in 1974 and 1975, Denver's albums Back Home Again and Windsong reached number one on both the pop and country album charts. His singles were also successful on both charts: "Sunshine on My Shoulders" No. 1 pop, No. 42 country; "Annie's Song" No. 1 pop, No. 9 country; "Thank God I'm a Country Boy" No. 1 pop and country; "Back Home Again" No. 5 pop, No. 1 country; and "I'm Sorry" No. 1 pop and country.

Another 1970s crossover artist was Olivia Newton-John, who emerged from Australia in the mid-1970s, hoping to make it big in the United States. Her single "Let Me Be There" became a big pop-country crossover hit in 1974. She won a Grammy award for "Best Female Country Vocal Performance" for the song and also won the Country Music Association's most coveted award for females, "Female Vocalist of the Year" (beating out established Nashville artists Dolly Parton, Loretta Lynn, and Tanya Tucker, as well as Canadian transplant Anne Murray). Her win sparked a backlash, with several traditional country artists forming the Association of Country Entertainers (ACE) to promote what they considered to be "real country music." Newton-John scored a string of pop-country hits in 1974 and 1975 including "I Honestly Love You", "Have You Never Been Mellow", and "Please Mr. Please", before moving away from country in the late 1970s after starring in Grease and focusing mostly on pop music from then onward.

The debate raged into 1975 and reached its apex at that year's Country Music Association Awards when reigning Entertainer of the Year Charlie Rich (who himself had a series of crossover hits) presented the award to his successor, John Denver. As he read Denver's name, Rich set fire to the envelope with a cigarette lighter. The ACE would only last two years; its two biggest backers, firm traditionalists George Jones and Tammy Wynette, faced a bitter divorce, and Jean Shepard, the other major backer of the ACE, closed down the organization when she could not find others that shared her enthusiasm for the association's purpose.

Although known primarily as a rock performer in the 1970s, Linda Ronstadt had considerable country chart success with "I Can't Help It (If I'm Still in Love with You)" (1974), for which she won the Grammy Award for Best Female Country Vocal Performance in 1976, "When Will I Be Loved" and "Love is a Rose" (1975), and "Blue Bayou" (1977).

Several artists principally identified as rock, such as the Eagles and America, scored significant pop chart hits with country rock songs, though they may have reached country charts rarely or not at all.

Glen Campbell's "Rhinestone Cowboy" was a crossover hit between the pop and country charts in 1975. "Rhinestone Cowboy" was produced by blue-eyed soul writer team Dennis Lambert & Brian Potter and written by Larry Weiss. The Bellamy Brothers' "Let Your Love Flow", Amazing Rhythm Aces' "Third Rate Romance" (1976), Glen Campbell's "Southern Nights" (1977), and Anne Murray's "You Needed Me" (1978) were additional examples of late '70s country pop hits.

In 1977, Kenny Rogers, former frontman of the rock band the First Edition, burst onto the country charts with "Lucille" and would go on to rank among the most successful country pop performers. After "Lucille", Rogers had a string of songs that did well on both the country and pop charts around the world, including "Daytime Friends", "The Gambler", and "Coward of the County", all of which were produced by Larry Butler. Rogers would go on to push the boundaries of pop influence in country music, having records produced by the likes of the Bee Gees, Lionel Richie, David Foster, and George Martin, all of which did well in both the pop and country markets. Barbara Mandrell also became known for her blue-eyed soul vocal style. Several of her other hits charted on the country adult contemporary charts, but her songs were the Bubbling under Billboard Top 100 charts. She was one of country music's most successful artists during the 1970s and 1980s. She was involved in a serious car accident in 1984. Her big country hits included "Sleeping Single In a Double Bed" and "(If Loving You is Wrong) I Don't Want to Be Right."

In 1977, Dolly Parton crossed over into the pop music world with her No. 1 country and No. 3 pop hit "Here You Come Again."

=== 1980s ===
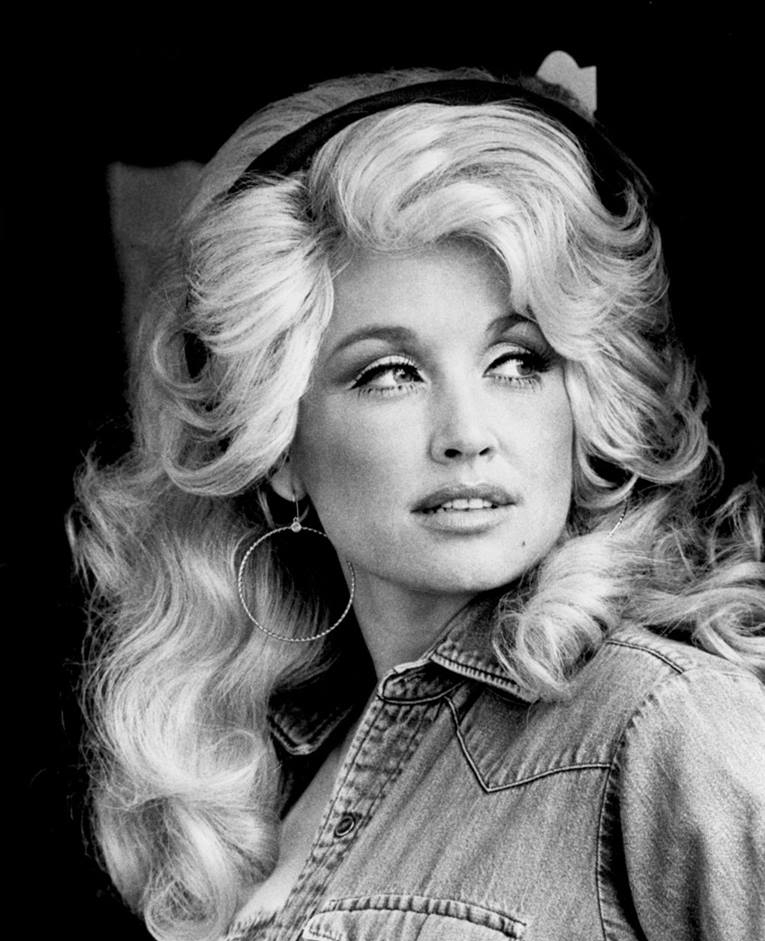
Dolly Parton achieved international recognition for her work as both a musician and actress during the 1970s and 1980s.

Parton earned another big hit with "9 to 5", which topped both the country and pop singles charts in early 1981, supplemented by the 1980 film of the same name.

Country pop reached new heights immediately following the movie Urban Cowboy in the early 1980s. Urban Cowboy was the third music-themed hit film to star John Travolta, each from a different genre; much like Saturday Night Fever did for disco and Grease did for oldies, Urban Cowboy popularized pop-country, helping to boost the career of Mickey Gilley in particular (whose real-life bar and music were featured in the film), along with other songs that appeared on the film's soundtrack.

Willie Nelson and Dottie West came back in the 1980s. Dottie West released a series of hit duets with Kenny Rogers. Kenny Rogers also had a duet hit with Parton, the Bee Gees–penned "Islands in the Stream", which topped the country and pop singles charts in late 1983. (The Bee Gees themselves have one credited country hit to their name, 1978's "Rest Your Love on Me", which was made an even bigger hit by Conway Twitty in 1980.) Dottie West achieved her biggest success as a country singer during this time, acquiring her first No. 1 hit as a solo artist in 1980 with "A Lesson in Leaving".

Oak Ridge Boys, Alabama, Eddie Rabbitt, Juice Newton, Bertie Higgins, and Ronnie Milsap also had crossover success during the early 1980s. The Oak Ridge Boys had a crossover hit "Elvira" in 1981. Four of Alabama's most successful songs of the early 1980s—"Feels So Right", "Love in the First Degree", Take Me Down", and "The Closer You Get" (the last two of which were covers of songs by then–pop band Exile)—all reached the Top 40 of the Billboard Hot 100, while four of Ronnie Milsap's No. 1 songs between 1980 and 1982 reached the Hot 100s Top 20, the most successful of which was the No. 5 hit "(There's) No Gettin' Over Me". Rabbitt had three top-5 pop songs in 1980–1981, and "I Love a Rainy Night" reached No. 1 on both the Hot 100 and Billboard Hot Country Singles chart. Country star Juice Newton also achieved country pop success with several crossover hits in the early '80s, including "Queen of Hearts", "The Sweetest Thing (I've Ever Known)", and Grammy-winner "Break It To Me Gently"; in addition, she wrote "Sweet Sweet Smile", the only country hit for easy-listening act the Carpenters. Former pop acts such as Exile, Marie Osmond, Bill Medley (formerly of the Righteous Brothers), Tom Jones, Michael Johnson, Billy Joe Royal, B. J. Thomas, Nicolette Larson, Paul Davis and Dan Seals ("England Dan" of England Dan and John Ford Coley) began targeting their music at the country market in the early 1980s with a country pop sound.

Although a number of country pop artists continued to have hits, most notably Alabama, Parton, Mandrell, Rabbitt, and Milsap, the mid-1980s saw a major sea change within the country music industry and the revival of traditional country sounds, as the boost in country's crossover popularity had collapsed; by 1984, country record sales had fallen to the point they were before Urban Cowboy was released.

=== 1990s revival ===
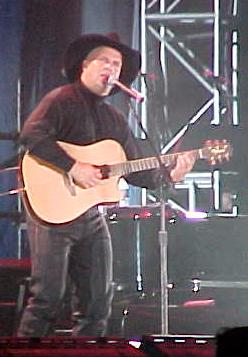
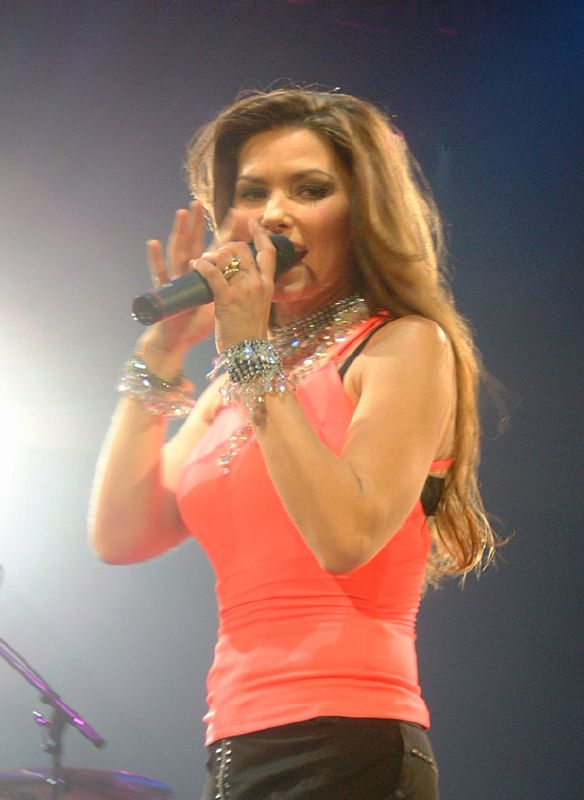
Garth Brooks and Shania Twain were the most successful country pop singers of the 1990s.

Country pop enjoyed a resurgence in the 1990s, primarily because of the beginning proliferation of country music to the FM radio dial, which in turn was aided by the increase of FCC licenses for suburban and rural FM stations in the late 1980s and an increase in talk radio on the AM dial, as well as a decision by Billboard to no longer count record sales toward the country singles chart, giving country radio full power to determine a chart ranking by their collective airplay. The commercial boom in the industry during this time was also attributable to the rise of talented artists who coincided with the implementation of new marketing strategies that were meant to attract a larger fan base; this further pushed the genre into a pop musical style with an emerging new image. Garth Brooks rose to fame during the 1990s with a string of several extremely successful albums and songs. Shania Twain would rival this success with her three albums The Woman in Me, Come On Over, and Up!. In the last few years, country singer LeAnn Rimes has proved her ability to sing country pop songs such as the record-setting "How Do I Live", which spent 69 weeks on the Billboard Hot 100, the second longest single in the record history. This achievement came in spite of the fact that a nearly identical version of the same song by Trisha Yearwood was released at the same time and was also a hit. Rimes also had a hit with the pop songs "Can't Fight the Moonlight" and "I Need You", the latter of which required a remix to be suitable for country radio.

Incorporating elements of pop into country music became extremely popular by the late '90s, thus producing many crossover hits and artists, especially on the adult contemporary charts. Country love songs also became more popular with songs like "To Make You Feel My Love", "Cowboy Take Me Away", "I Love You", "Breathe", "It's Your Love", "Just to See You Smile", "This Kiss", "The Way You Love Me", "You're Still the One", "From This Moment On", "You've Got a Way", "Valentine", etc.

In the 1990s, many country artists experienced huge crossover success. In addition to Brooks, Twain, Martina McBride, and Rimes, Billy Ray Cyrus, Tim McGraw, Faith Hill, Dixie Chicks, Jo Dee Messina, Lonestar, Mary-Chapin Carpenter and Wynonna Judd all had songs cross over to Top 40 and/or Adult Contemporary radio, sometimes with remixes eliminating steel guitars and other "country" elements to be more suitable for pop radio. Brooks, Reba McEntire, and other artists also maintained high profiles on the album charts despite having less radio crossover success.

=== 2000s and 2010s ===
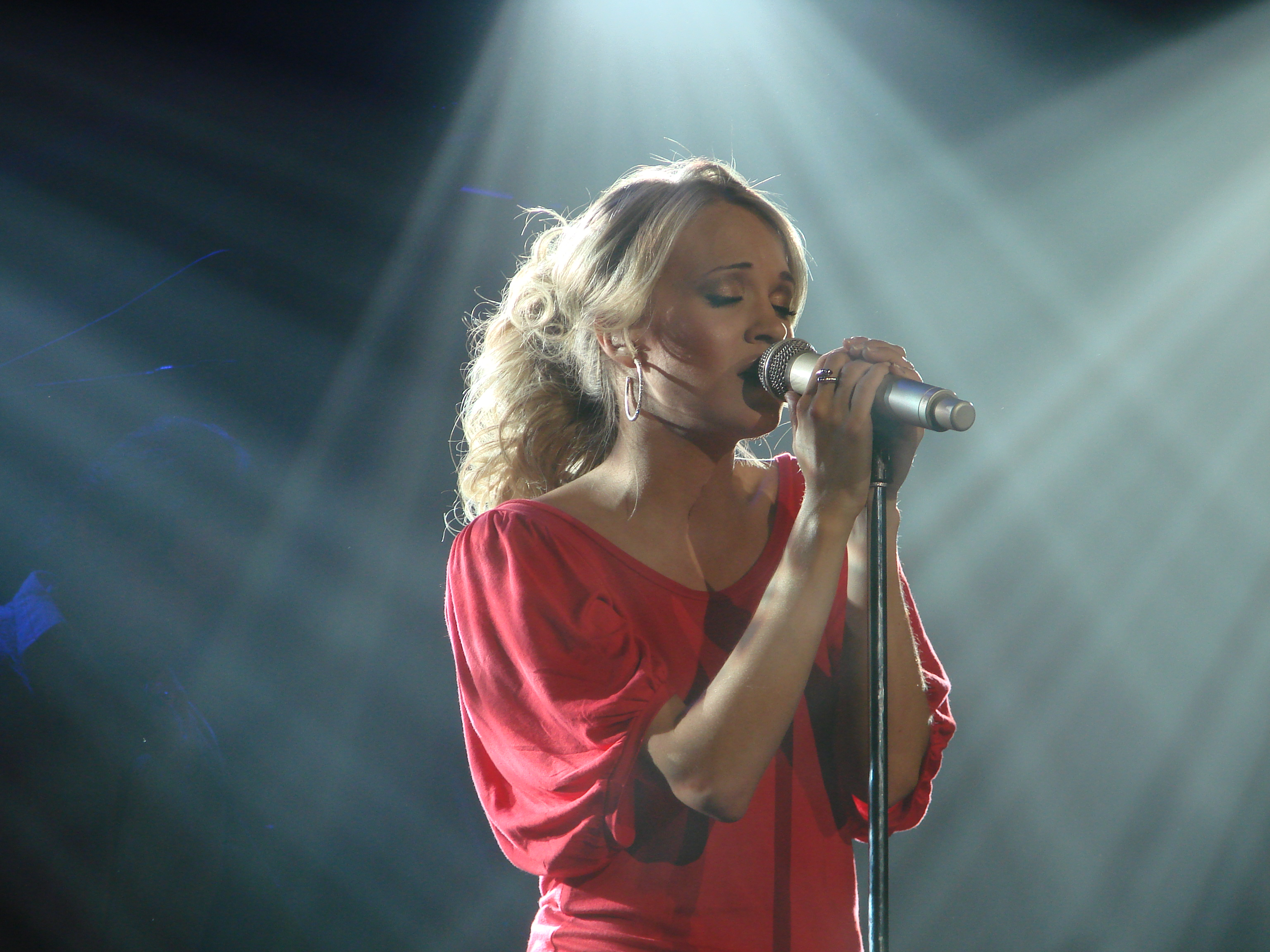
American Idol winner Carrie Underwood

The early 2000s also saw continued success of artists like Lee Ann Womack, who scored a big crossover hit with "I Hope You Dance", peaking at number one on the U.S. Adult Contemporary chart. As well as Faith Hill and Rascal Flatts, whose 2002 album Cry and 2004 album Feels Like Today respectively, both reached number one on the Billboard 200 album chart and Billboard Top Country Albums. However, by the mid-2000s, there were fewer country acts having crossover success. That was until singer Carrie Underwood won the fourth season of American Idol in May 2005. With her exposure from American Idol, Underwood's debut single, "Inside Your Heaven", became the first song by a prominently country artist to ever debut at number one on the Billboard Hot 100. Underwood continued to have crossover success in 2006 and 2007, with her hit single "Before He Cheats", which was notable for becoming a success on mainstream pop radio without a more "pop-friendly" remix. Underwood has had additional, but more spotty, success on pop radio since.

Nonetheless, she disproved the notion that country artists, especially female country artists, were limited to success only within one genre. Further supplying that evidence was the success of Taylor Swift, who released her debut album in 2006.

Swift rose to fame in the late 2000s as a teenage artist, buoyed by the success of her country pop singles "Teardrops On My Guitar" and "Our Song", with the latter making Swift the youngest person in history to single-handedly write and perform a number-one song on the Billboard Hot Country Songs chart. Her chart-topping second studio album Fearless was released in 2008; it spawned international hit singles "Love Story" and "You Belong With Me", becoming two of the best selling singles of all time. In 2009, Swift became the first country artist in history to win an MTV Video Music Award. Later in 2010, Swift won the Grammy Award for Album of the Year and Best Country Album for Fearless, becoming the youngest artist to win the top prize at that time. Fearless went on to become Diamond certified by Recording Industry Association of America for moving over 10 million units in the U.S. Her subsequent albums Speak Now (2010) and Red (2012) topped multiple charts globally, including the Top Country Albums and Billboard 200; both of those albums sold 1 million copies in their debut week sales, opening 1.0 million for Speak Now and 1.2 million for Red. On Red, Swift incorporated elements of electronic and dance such as dubstep and worked with pop producers Max Martin and Shellback on several tracks, including the pop hits "We Are Never Ever Getting Back Together", "I Knew You Were Trouble", and "22", which were more favored by pop radio over country radio. Swift collaborated with rapper B.o.B on his country rap single "Both of Us", and dueted with Tim McGraw on his 2013 single "Highway Don't Care" featuring Keith Urban. Swift labeled herself as a pop artist since 2014's 1989, which also won the Grammy awards for Album of the Year and Best Pop Vocal album, making Swift the first and only artist to win those awards in both pop and country genres. The subsequent Reputation (2017) and Lover (2019) were pop albums, though Lover drew on country influences in songs like "Lover" and "Soon You'll Get Better"; the latter being a collaboration with Dixie Chicks. Swift has also written songs for other country pop acts, such as Little Big Town's "Better Man" and Sugarland's "Babe". Achieving both national and international prominence through her tour gross, sales records, and critical acclaim, Swift has been credited for bringing recognition of country music "within the broad expanse of music worldwide"; the Country Music Association acknowledged that her talent and presence "will have a long-term positive impact on the appreciation of country music for generations to come"

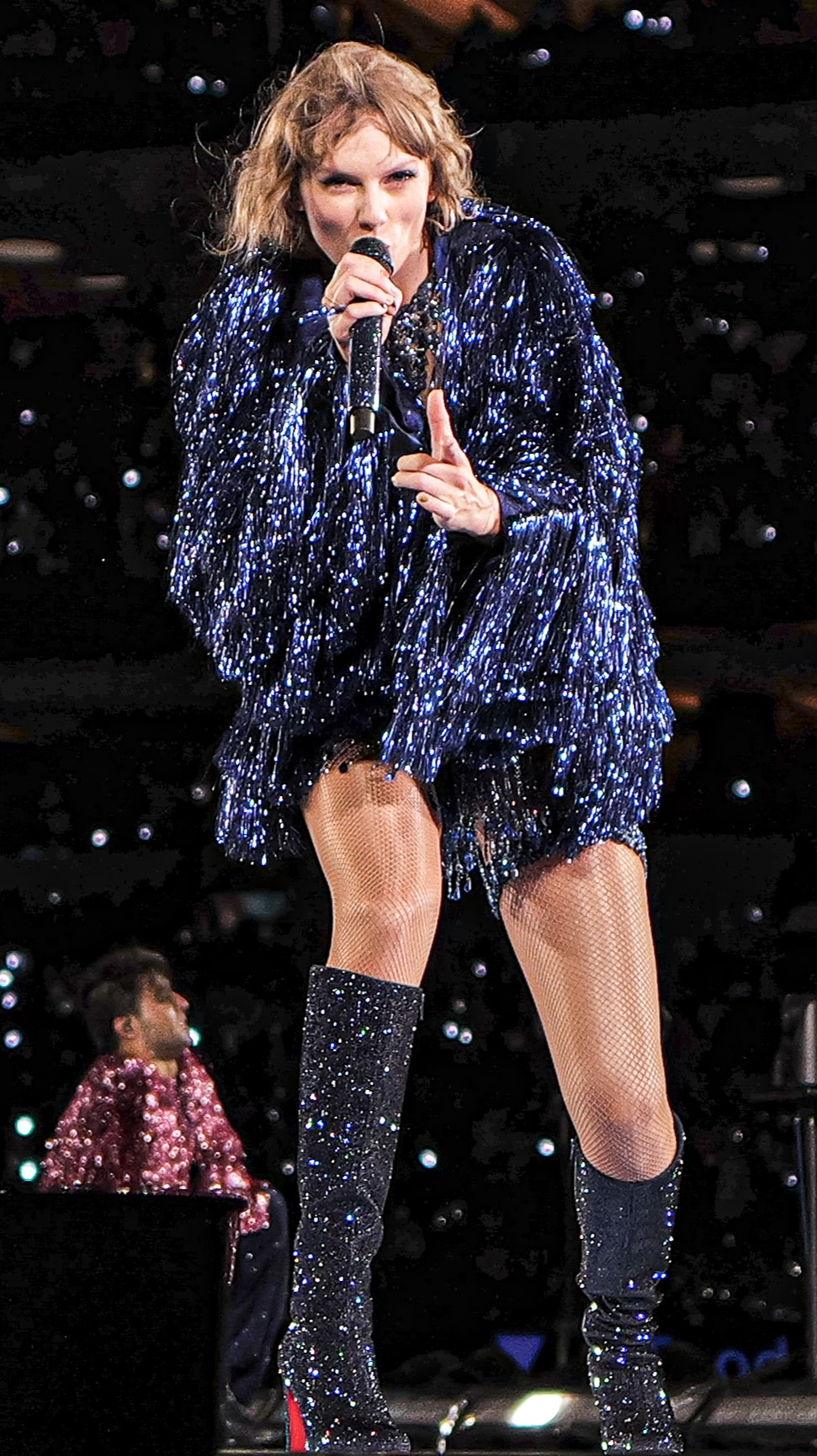
Crossover artist, former country star, and current global pop icon, Taylor Swift

The 2010s saw many changes for the country pop genre, not only in sound, but also in values; there was a significant shift away from big-voiced power ballads to more casual, hip-hop influenced styles. One such trend was the controversial bro-country subgenre, which Vulture described as "music by and of the tatted, gym-toned, party-hearty young American white dude."

Of particular note, in 2012, Billboard restored recording sales to the chart formula but also added airplay from non-country stations, giving an inherent advantage to country pop crossover songs, at the same time maintaining the 1990 formula solely to measure country radio airplay. After the change, crossover songs have increasingly set the record for the longest run atop the country chart for longer and longer stretches; "Meant to Be" currently holds the record, 50 weeks and counting as of November 2018, more than double the pre-2012 record (Leroy Van Dyke's "Walk On By" was atop the chart for 19 weeks in 1963, during the 1958–1990 period of a unified sales, jukebox and airplay chart; three songs topped the various separate country charts for 21 weeks each between 1948 and 1955).

Sam Hunt also earned significant crossover appeal. His 2014 debut album Montevallo, which featured hip-hop and rap influences, reached number 1 on Top Country Albums and number 3 on the Billboard 200. His 2017 single "Body Like a Back Road" reached number 1 on Hot Country Songs, number 6 on the Billboard Hot 100, and number 11 on Adult Top 40.

Hip hop's penchant for story-telling is one of the reasons frequently cited for its influence on mainstream country pop. Additionally, there are now no less than four generations who have grown up listening to both country music and hip hop, as evidenced in the subgenre country rap, starting with Jelly Roll, Colt Ford, Cowboy Troy, and Kid Rock.

In 2016, Morgan Wallen signed to Big Loud, releasing his debut album, If I Know Me in 2018, with strong hip-hop elements like trap beats and snap tracks. If I Know Me included the singles "Up Down" featuring Florida Georgia Line, "Whiskey Glasses", and "Chasin' You"; the album reached number 1 on the Billboard Top Country Albums chart.

In 2018, many country artists achieved international pop hit singles in collaborations with mainstream pop artists. This included Chris Stapleton who collaborated with Justin Timberlake on Hot 100 top ten single "Say Something"; Urban-pop star Bebe Rexha whose duet with the country duo Florida Georgia Line "Meant to Be" reached No. 2 both in Australia and in the U.S.; and German DJ Zedd whose dance hit "The Middle" featured main vocals from Maren Morris and peaked at No. 5 on the Billboard Hot 100. Morris's 'The Bones,' winner of two CMA Awards and nominated for a Grammy, topped four different Billboard charts and peaked at No. 12 on the weekly Hot 100. 'The Middle,' her 2018 dance-pop collaboration with producers Zedd and Grey, peaked at No. 5 on the weekly Hot 100 Songs and was nominated for three Grammys."

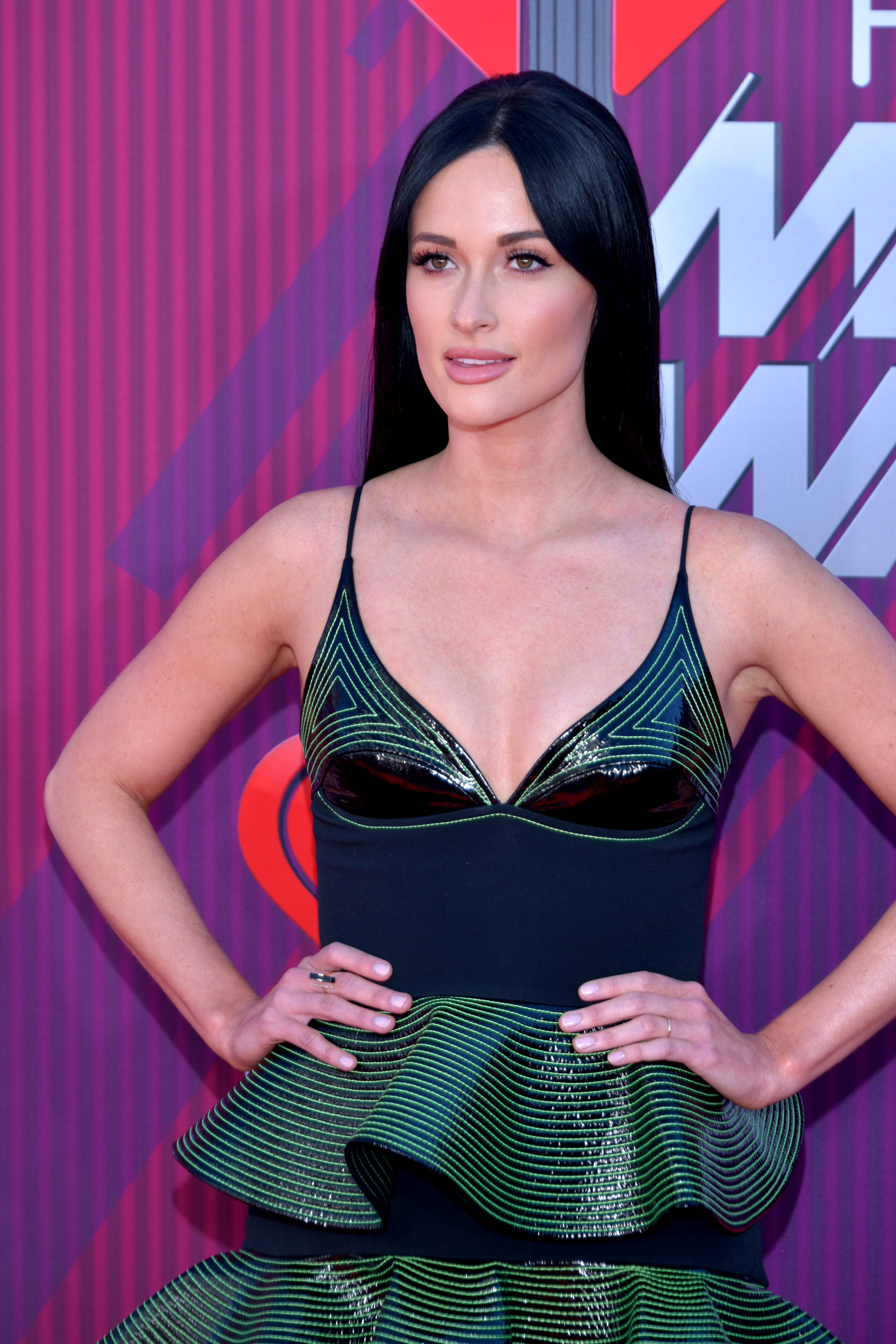
Multi-Grammy winner Kacey Musgraves

The way audiences consumed their music also changed during the 2010s, as streaming services became more prominent, thus affecting how artists marketed their songs. Being played on the radio was no longer a requirement to be a contender in the country industry, as it had been for decades before; one such example was Kacey Musgraves. Despite receiving little airplay for her singles sent to country radio, Musgraves won the Grammy award for Album of the Year in 2019, for her fourth studio album Golden Hour. Musgraves's success was unprecedented in the sense that she earned fans from both the pop and country genres without the benefit of airplay on country radio, instead promoting her music through online media platforms such as YouTube and Apple Music. The Hoya pointed out Musgraves's groundbreaking approach, writing, "Musgraves's refusal to bend the knee for Nashville record label executives, coupled with her massive success, proves she is the Nashville big machine's worst nightmare. She is a female artist who managed to find widespread success in an industry that endlessly tried to muzzle her."

The disparity between male and female artists on country radio became even more obvious during the back half of this decade, with one study finding that male artists accounted for 5.5 to 1 in total airplay during the years 2000–2018. In 2018, that number only increased, with a ratio of male vs. female at 9.7 to 1. In 2015, radio consultant Keith Hill made controversial comments about why women received less representation on the radio, referring to male artists as the "salad" and women as "tomatoes"; the controversy became known as Tomato-gate.

Collaborations between country and pop artists became even more popularized during this decade, as well. In October 2019, country duo Dan + Shay released a joint single with pop singer-songwriter Justin Bieber, "10,000 Hours", which went to number one on both the Billboard Hot Country Songs and Country Airplay charts.

Two artists who were influential in shifting mainstream attitudes about the genre's more pop-inflected sound were Sam Hunt and Maren Morris. As NPR Music wrote, "Sam Hunt and Maren Morris arrived on the scene in the years that followed, each of them possessing fluency in the postures and cadences of millennial pop that turned heads and blurred boundaries. '[M]odern country singers love to flaunt phrases and attitudes borrowed from hip-hop, but Hunt's borrowings are softer and sneakier,' noted Kelefa Sanneh." Jon Caramanica said: "Think of all the ways dissenters have tried to upend country in recent years: by sneaking in rhythmic vocal tics learned from rappers, by thinning out the genre's musical baggage, by pledging inclusive values. Ms. Morris, an astute synthesizer, has studied and perfected them all." In an article published in 2019, Time called Morris "the future of country music."

=== 2020s–present ===
The debate on what constituted the country sound continued into the 2020s. At the February 2020 Country Radio Seminar, there was discussion on the increase in fan attention to pop and country collaborations, in addition to an increase in the use of streaming services. In April 2020, country singer-songwriter Kelsea Ballerini released "The Other Girl" as a joint single with pop singer Halsey from her third studio album Kelsea. The single peaked within the top twenty of both the Hot Country Songs and U.S. Adult Top 40 charts.

March 2020 saw the start of global quarantines due to the COVID-19 pandemic that would last until late 2021. The summer of 2020 saw protests for racial justice in many cities across the United States, stemming from the Murder of George Floyd. On June 2, Mickey Guyton released "Black Like Me", a country pop piano ballad that details Guyton's experiences as a black woman navigating life and a career in country music. The song charted at number four on the Country Digital Sales Chart. Guyton received a nomination for Best Country Solo Performance at the 63rd Annual Grammy Awards, making her the first black woman to receive a Grammy nomination in that category. On her nomination, Guyton said it was "a testament to never give up and live your truth. I can't think of a better song to make history with than 'Black Like Me' and I hope that I can continue to help open doors for other women and people who look like me."

In 2020, American Idol finalist Gabby Barrett topped Billboard's Hot Country Songs for over 20 weeks with her single, "I Hope", which was later remixed into a duet with pop singer-songwriter Charlie Puth. Their collaboration went on to top Billboard's Adult Pop Songs chart in October 2020. In its 45th week, the single reached the top five of the all-genre Billboard Hot 100, achieving the slowest climb to the top five in the chart's history.

In January 2021, Nashville Scene pointed out the commercial impact and critical acclaim brought on by songs considered to be crossover hits, writing, "The walls around the country genre seem evermore flimsy these days. Thanks in part to streaming, 'Old Town Road' became the most-certified song in RIAA history earlier this month, racking up 14 million sales."

Morgan Wallen's second album, Dangerous: The Double Album, was released in January 2021, and in February 2021, became the only country album in the 64-year history of the Billboard 200 to spend its first seven weeks at number one. It spent a total of ten weeks at that spot, the first album to do so since Whitney Houston's Whitney in 1987. The album included Billboard No. 1 singles "More Than My Hometown", "7 Summers", and "Wasted on You".

Despite placing at the top of Billboard's Top Country Albums chart, Kacey Musgraves' album Star-Crossed was deemed ineligible for nomination in the Best Country Album category for the 64th Grammys, owing to the policy that potential nominated albums must contain at least "51 percent of new country recordings". Billboard, however, pointed out that Musgraves was hardly the first to face controversy from the Grammys. Musgraves did, however, earn two nominations for Best Country Song and Best Country Performance for the album track, "Camera Roll."

In March 2023, Morgan Wallen released his third studio album, One Thing at a Time, with the chart topping crossover hit, "Last Night". For the first time in the chart's 65-year history three country pop songs placed within the first four spots on Billboard's all-genre Hot 100. Billboard noted the overall increase in the popularity of country pop and credited Morgan Wallen with 40 percent of its growth, calling the phenomenon the "Wallen Effect". The popularity of country pop continued to surge, with a 2023 Economist poll finding it has become more popular than hip hop in the United States.

In September 2023, in a conversation with the Los Angeles Times, Maren Morris announced her departure from the country music industry. Citing what she viewed as the country music industry's "unwillingness to honestly reckon with its history of racism and misogyny and to open its gates to more women and queer people and people of color," further, she said, “I thought I’d like to burn it to the ground and start over...But it’s burning itself down without my help.”

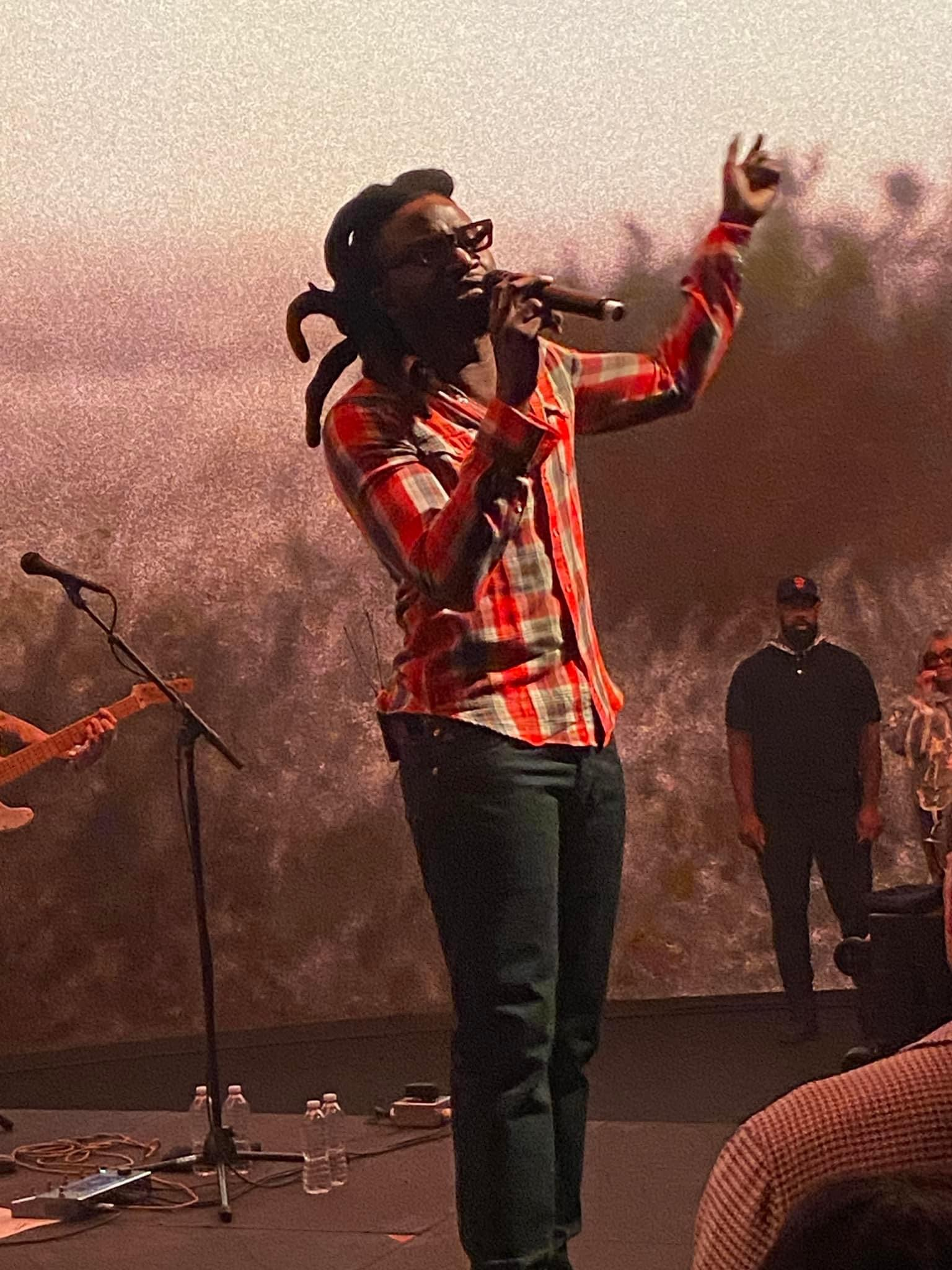
"A Bar Song (Tipsy)" singer, Shaboozey

In 2024, country pop saw a resurgence in mainstream culture. Pop stars crossed over into the genre, Post Malone released the chart topping album, F-1 Trillion, and Beyoncé released, Cowboy Carter, which earned her Best Country Album and Album of the Year at the 67th Annual Grammy Awards. In April 2024, Shaboozey released "A Bar Song (Tipsy)", a blend of country pop and hip-hop, which would go on to reach number one on Billboard Hot Country Songs chart as well as the Billboard Hot 100 for multiple weeks. It would go on to be the longest-leading Billboard Hot Country Songs number one by a single artist. As of April 2025, the song had surpassed Mark Ronson feat. Bruno Mars' "Uptown Funk!" on the Billboard Hot 100 to become the second biggest hit of the 21st century and the sixth biggest hit of all time.

=== Global expansion of country pop ===
Carly Pearce is a country music star known for her honest, heartfelt songwriting and multiple award-winning hits. She began performing at a young age with a bluegrass band and at Dollywood, eventually moving to Nashville to pursue her dream of becoming a singer-songwriter. After years of persistence, she broke through with her 2017 hit single “Every Little Thing.” Pearce has noted how quickly country music is growing overseas. “I’ve been to Europe several times, but I feel like in the last year or two, country music has connected there in a really impactful way,” she says. “The growth of my music over there blew my mind.” Marc Dennis, chair of the CMA International Committee and Pearce’s agent, adds that “the growth of the format has been extraordinary over the last decade,” and believes there is still “a huge opportunity to be the No. 1 format globally.”

The CMA is closely tracking three major international markets where country music is rapidly expanding. In the United Kingdom, the genre reached over 2% of the total music market in 2024, with 3.6 billion streams out of 179.1 billion—nearly double the previous year’s country consumption. These numbers exclude Taylor Swift, whose catalog would push the totals even higher. The most-streamed country artists in the U.K. in 2024 were Zach Bryan, Luke Combs, Morgan Wallen, Shaboozey, and Chris Stapleton. Growth is also strong in Germany, where country music surpassed one billion streams for the first time in 2024 (again excluding Swift) and saw a 77% increase in streaming from 2023 to 2024. The third major market is Australia, where country music streams rose 28% in 2024. Country is now the fourth most popular genre in the country, with rock leading at 22%, pop and R&B/hip-hop tied at 19%, and country at 6%—up a full percentage point from 2023.

== See also ==
- Blues
- "Gone Country"
- "Long Time Gone"
- "Murder on Music Row"
- Self-parody
