= Panacea Records =

American record label

- Founded: 1993; 32 years ago
- Founder: Bill Ray; Paul Trust
- Genre: Rock; country; alternative
- Country of origin: United States
- Location: Miami, Florida, U.S.

Panacea Records is an independent American record label founded by Bill Ray and Paul Trust in 1993. The label has a primary focus on rock music but has branched out into electronic and country music as well. Panacea Records has released music by artists including Morgan Wallen, Atom Smash, Endo, and Sunday Driver.

== History ==
Panacea Records was founded in 1993 by Bill Ray and Paul Trust. Operating primarily out of South Florida, Panacea Records has signed numerous local bands such as Al's Not Well, Endo, and Sunday Driver to record contracts. The band Atom Smash was formed by Sergio Sanchez with the assistance of Panacea Records in 2007. Atom Smash was able to record and release both the Sacrifice and Kill Me EPs under Panacea Records before they eventually signed with Jive Records. In 2014 the country music singer Morgan Wallen met Sergio Sanchez while the former was on The Voice. Sanchez then introduced Wallen to Bill Ray and Paul Trust of Panacea Records who signed the country music singer in 2015. In the same year, Wallen and Panacea recorded and released the EP Stand Alone and Wallen's debut single "Spin You Around". "Spin You Around" has since been streamed over 300 million times on Spotify, over 40 million times on YouTube and over 400 million times worldwide as of May 12, 2025.

On January 26th 2024, Panacea Records released a deluxe 10th anniversary edition of Morgan Wallen's 2015 EP Stand Alone that included previously unreleased songs. These songs were recorded in the same sessions as the original Stand Alone songs. Before the release of the 10th anniversary album Wallen released a statement on his Instagram page saying that the release of this album was happening "against his wishes". Alongside this statement, Wallen released an acoustic cover of the Stand Alone song "Spin You Around" titled "Spin You Around (1/24)".

== Artists signed by Panacea Records ==
- Al's Not Well
- Endo
- Sunday Driver
- Atom Smash
- Morgan Wallen
- Eleni and the Uprising
- Kind Villain
