= The Cleopatra Complex =

American band

- Gea Gamboa of The Cleopatra Complex

Background information
- Origin: Miami, Florida, United States
- Genres: electronica, alternative rock, pop
- Years active: 2012–Present
- Labels: management: Working Group Artist Management
- Members: Gea Gamboa; Paul Trust
- Website: www.thecleopatracomplex.com

The Cleopatra Complex is an American rock band from Miami, Florida, United States. The band was formed in 2012 by Gea Gamboa and Paul Trust shortly after a project they were previously working on named All The Pretty Cars dissolved. Gamboa and Trust have worked together since 2003, when at 15 she started her first band, Faces of March, for which Gamboa was the lead singer/writer and Trust was the producer/writer. Trust has also produced or written for such artists as Atom Smash, Say Anything, Diecast, Endo and James Durbin.

The Cleopatra Complex has a sound influenced by the multi cultural landscape of South Florida and incorporates elements from rock, reggae and electronica.

The band's first video for the song "Killing Time" was shot and edited entirely on an iPhone 4 by director Keith Douglas Charles Moore, and won Best Music Video at the 2012 iPhone Film Festival. It was screened at the 2013 Macworld iWorld event in San Francisco, California.

The band is currently signed to Working Group Artist Management and has performed on the 2013 Vans Warped Tour.

== Band members ==
- Gea Gamboa - Lead and background vocals. writing
- Paul Trust - keyboards, drums, guitars, writing, production

== Touring members ==
- Matt Beach (guitars)
- Nick LaNave (drums)
