= Morgan Wallen =

American country pop singer (born 1993)

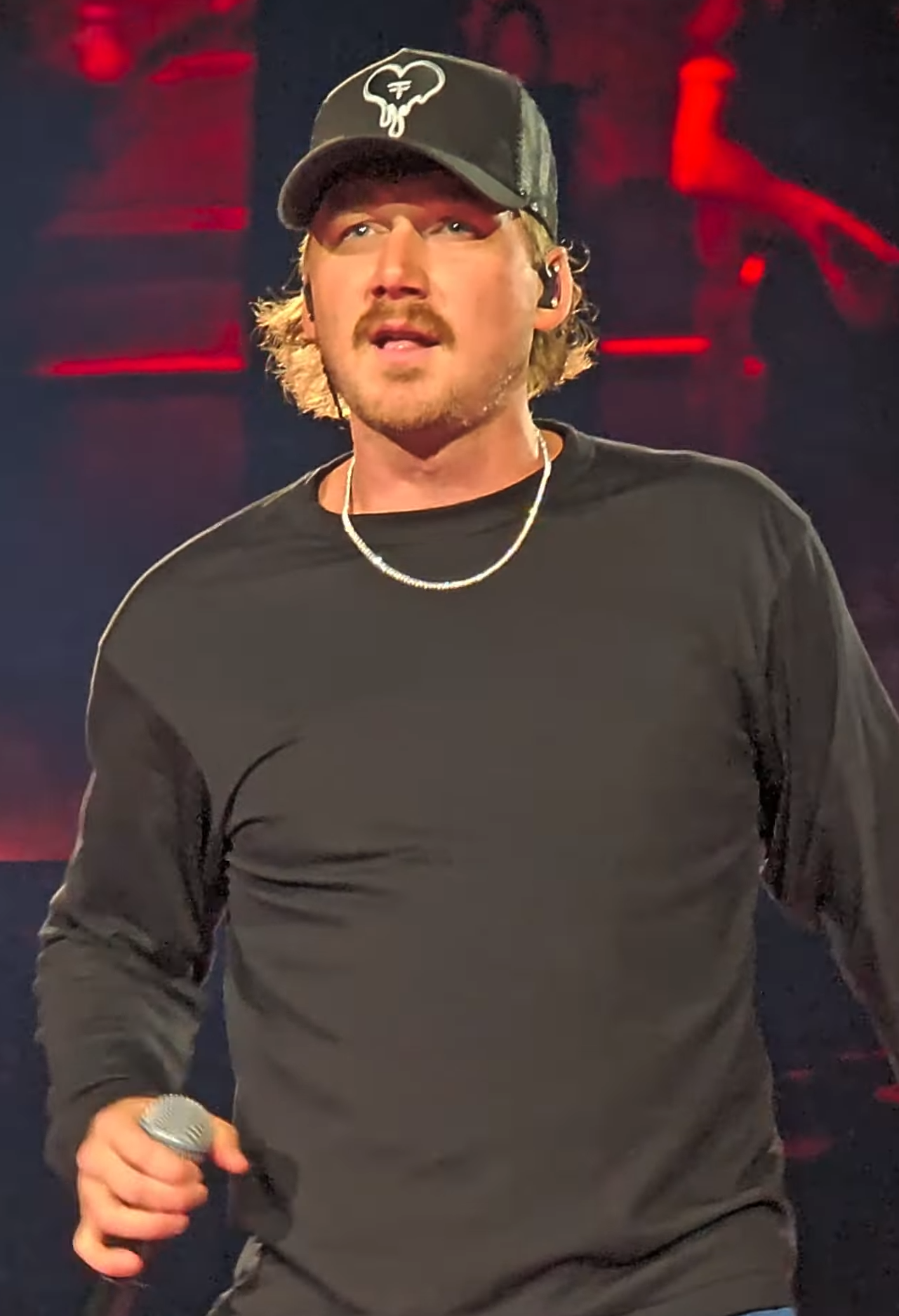
- Wallen performing in 2024
- Born: Morgan Cole Wallen; May 13, 1993 (age 33); Sneedville, Tennessee, U.S.
- Occupations: Singer; songwriter
- Years active: 2014–present
- Works: Discography
- Children: 1
- Musical career
- Genres: Country; country pop
- Instruments: Vocals; guitar; piano
- Labels: Panacea; Big Loud; Republic; Mercury
- Website: morganwallen.com

Morgan Cole Wallen (born May 13, 1993) is an American country pop singer from Sneedville, Tennessee. He first gained recognition as a contestant on the sixth season of The Voice in 2014. After signing to Big Loud, he released his debut studio album, If I Know Me (2018), which reached number one on the US Top Country Albums chart and featured his breakout singles "Whiskey Glasses" and "Chasin' You".

Wallen's second studio album, Dangerous: The Double Album (2021), became the first country album to spend its first seven weeks at number one on the Billboard 200, while his third studio album, One Thing at a Time (2023), spent 19 non-consecutive weeks at number one. Its third single, "Last Night", topped the Billboard Hot 100 and the Year-End Hot 100 chart of 2023. In 2024, he featured on "I Had Some Help" with Post Malone, which became the first song to simultaneously debut atop the Hot 100 and Hot Country Songs charts. His fourth studio album, I'm the Problem (2025), debuted at number one on the Billboard 200 and produced nine top-ten hits on the Hot 100, including the number-one singles "Love Somebody" and "What I Want".

Wallen has been praised for his cross-genre appeal and cultural impact. He has received several accolades, including an Academy of Country Music Award, fourteen Billboard Music Awards, and won Entertainer of the Year at the 58th Annual Country Music Association Awards. Wallen holds multiple Billboard chart records: He is the only artist to have two albums spend at least 100 weeks in the top ten of the Billboard 200, the only artist to have two albums spend at least 10 first-weeks atop the Billboard 200, the artist with the most weeks at number-one on the Top Country Albums chart (187), and his single "You Proof" is the longest-running Billboard Country Airplay number-one of all time, with ten non-consecutive weeks atop the chart. He also holds the record for being the modern country artist with the most Billboard Hot 100 number-one hits, with four.

== Early life and education ==
Morgan Cole Wallen was born on May 13, 1993, in Sneedville, Tennessee, to Tommy and Lesli Wallen. Tommy served for a time as a local church pastor, while Lesli worked as a teacher. In his teens, the family moved south to Knox County, where he attended Gibbs High School. He was a pitcher and shortstop for the school's baseball team, and hoped to continue in college, but tore his ulnar collateral ligament his senior year.

As a child, Wallen took piano and violin lessons and developed a diverse musical palette, largely due to his father exposing him to classic rock mainstays. During his teenage years, his tastes expanded toward rock bands like Breaking Benjamin and Nickelback, alongside hip-hop artists like Lil Wayne. Wallen has characterized his early adulthood as adrift; he worked in landscaping after graduating from high school and was disappointed by his inability to continue his baseball career. He returned to music as an emotional outlet and began teaching himself guitar at age 18. Around this time, he fell in love with country music, specifically modeling his burgeoning sound after the lineage of Keith Whitley and Eric Church.

== Career ==
=== 2014–2015: The Voice and Stand Alone ===
In 2014, Wallen competed on season 6 of the music competition program The Voice. He auditioned with the song "Collide" by Howie Day. Judges Shakira and Usher complimented his stylings, and Wallen joined Usher's team. He was later taken by Adam Levine's team after his second round, and later eliminated during the playoffs. Wallen later said of his experience on the show, "Some things in life are out of your control. Being the best you can be isn't. I didn't feel like I was the best I could have been. So I practiced harder". The Voice was instrumental in raising Wallen's profile, and he began to establish connections in the music industry.

While in California to appear on The Voice, Wallen began working with Sergio Sanchez of Atom Smash, a vocal coach on the program. Wallen relocated to Nashville to further his career, and he and Sanchez started a temporary band: Morgan Wallen & Them Shadows. Sanchez introduced Wallen to Bill Ray and Paul Trust of Panacea Records. In 2015, Wallen signed to Panacea Records where he was joined by Dominic Frost on guitar and released the Stand Alone (EP) on August 24, 2015, which was later certified Gold. "Spin You Around" was Wallen's debut single under Panacea Records; it was later certified triple platinum by the Recording Industry Association of America (RIAA) in 2025.

=== 2015–2019: If I Know Me ===
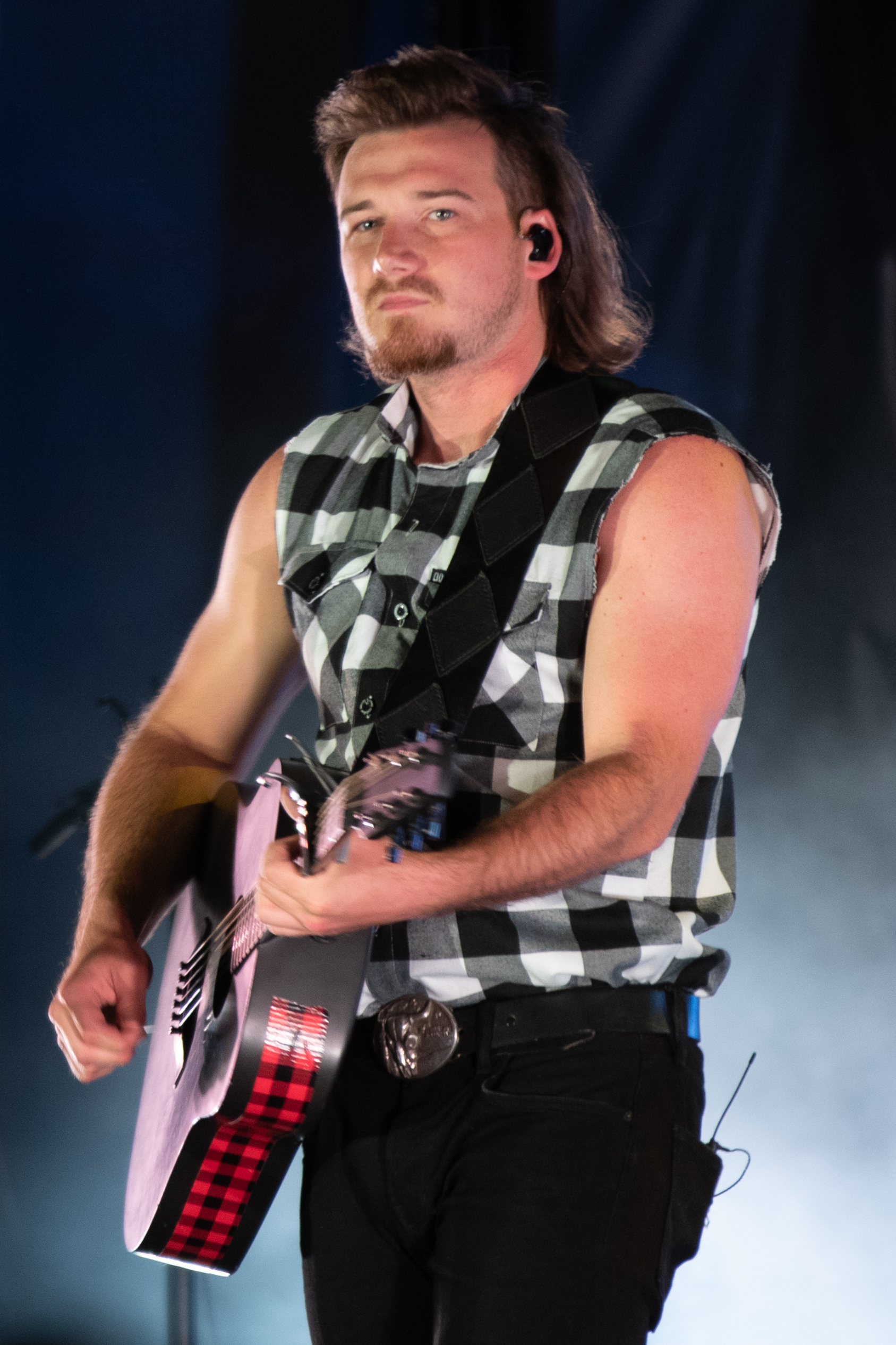
Wallen performing at Freedom Fest 2019

In 2015, Wallen's manager, Dirk Hemsath of Working Group Artist Management, sent a demo of Wallen to record executive Seth England, who had Wallen audition for Big Loud, an independent record label. They signed Wallen to the label and the publishing company, who began pairing his songs with other artists. That year, he released his debut single "The Way I Talk"; his first music video for the song followed in 2017. Wallen co-wrote A Thousand Horses' single "Preachin' to the Choir", Dallas Smith's "The Fall", as well as Jason Aldean's "You Make It Easy" with Florida Georgia Line's Tyler Hubbard, Brian Kelley, and Jordan Schmidt. He joined Florida Georgia Line on their Dig Your Roots Tour. He collaborated with the group on the single "Up Down", his first song to reach the top five of Billboard's Hot Country Songs chart.

At the outset of his career, Wallen underwent a personal stylistic shift, adopting a distinctive mullet and a look that Kelefa Sanneh, profiling Wallen's rise in a piece for The New Yorker, described as "Everyman rock star" and "not just a singer but a character". Wallen had decided to adopt the retro hairdo after seeing a younger photo of his father with the cut. Wallen's debut studio album, If I Know Me, was released on April 27, 2018, with its third single, "Whiskey Glasses", becoming his biggest success yet.

The song reached the top spot on both the Hot Country Songs and Country Airplay charts; it also marked his first top 40 appearance on the all-genre Hot 100 ranking, where it placed at number 17. It was Billboard's 2019 top Hot Country song and Top Country Airplay song. Sanneh characterized "Whiskey Glasses" as his signature song and a "perfectly constructed ode to a woman and a drink, lost and found, respectively". In 2019, Wallen joined Florida Georgia Line on their Can't Say I Ain't Country Tour. His next single, "Chasin' You", was serviced to radio in July 2019 and peaked at number two on the Hot Country Songs chart; like its predecessor, it captured the top spot on the overall year-end tally for 2020. In August 2020, If I Know Me reached No. 1 on the Top Country Albums chart after a record-breaking 114 weeks.

=== 2020–2021: Dangerous: The Double Album ===
Wallen's profile continued to rise, with a growing following on platforms such as TikTok, and he developed into an unwitting sex symbol. Wallen appeared on the cover of Billboard, whose headline read: "Is Morgan Wallen Country's Next Global Star?" In October 2020, during the COVID-19 pandemic, multiple videos were posted on TikTok showing Wallen ignoring CDC guidelines in bars and other locations in the Tuscaloosa, Alabama, area after attending a University of Alabama football game. As a result of this, Wallen's appearance as the musical guest on that week's episode of Saturday Night Live was cancelled; he ultimately performed in an episode two months later hosted by actor Jason Bateman, in which Bateman, Wallen, and several cast members parody the incident and resulting fallout.

At the start of the pandemic, Wallen had more time to write and record material, which developed into his sophomore album, the double-disc Dangerous: The Double Album (2021), which showcases a mix of country and R&B/pop balladry. Dangerous was an immediate blockbuster: it debuted atop the US Billboard 200 and the Canadian Albums Chart; it would remain atop the Canadian chart for four consecutive weeks, and the US chart for six consecutive weeks, marking the first new album from a country artist to do that since Garth Brooks' The Chase in 1992. The album also would become just the third album to spend its first ten weeks at number one on the Billboard 200 and the first in over 30 years since Whitney by Whitney Houston. Its singles—"More Than My Hometown", "7 Summers", "Sand in My Boots" and "Wasted on You"—were record-breaking hit songs that pushed Wallen farther into the national conversation. "7 Summers" earned him his first top 10 on the Hot 100, debuting and peaking at number 6, and was also chosen by Time as one of the best songs of the year. Wallen soon became the first artist to ever chart 6 songs within the top 10 of Hot Country Songs chart at the same time in the week after his album's release; likewise, the album charted 23 tracks on the Canadian Hot 100, and 19 tracks on the Hot 100 in the US.

==== Use of racial slur and increase in popularity ====
On February 2, 2021, TMZ released a video recorded on January 31 showing Wallen saying the racial slur "nigger" to one of his friends after a night out. He issued a statement shortly after and apologized. Several radio stations temporarily removed Wallen's music from airplay on their stations, and his songs were removed from Apple Music, Pandora and Spotify featured playlists. CMT and the Country Music Association removed Wallen's appearances from their platforms, and his record label Big Loud (and partner Republic Records) suspended its recording contract with him indefinitely. The Academy of Country Music announced that Wallen and the album Dangerous: The Double Album would be ineligible for the 56th Annual Academy of Country Music Awards. On February 10, Wallen shot an apology video in which he asked his fans not to defend him.

In April 2021, Wallen donated $300,000 to the Black Music Action Coalition in the names of 20 people who had counseled him following the incident. Those individuals were given the option to funnel their respective $15,000 donations to a charity of their choice, or keep the money within the BMAC. Wallen publicly spoke of his comments on Good Morning America on July 23, where he said that "I was around some of my friends, and we say dumb stuff together" and said that "I was wrong" to use those words. Wallen's songs returned to country radio in August when his single "Sand in My Boots" was released. He was nominated for Favorite Male Country Artist and Favorite Country Album for the 2021 American Music Awards, but was not invited to attend the ceremony, and was consequently unable to accept any awards if he won, which he did not.

In the week following the controversy, album sales of Dangerous surged. In some cases, the physical as well as digital album sales went up over 100% in the week following the controversy. He remained atop the Billboard charts for seven more weeks; If I Know Me even entered the top 10 for the first time. Over the ensuing years, Dangerous remained a juggernaut; Ben Sisario, writing in The New York Times, dubbed it "an unusually enduring hit". It has continued to break chart records: it was the best-performing album of 2021, and in 2022, the album broke the record for the most weeks in the top 10 on the Billboard 200 chart among albums by a solo artist, surpassing a record set a half-century before. Dangerous was awarded Album of the Year by the Academy of Country Music; Wallen also won Favorite Male Artist and Favorite Album at the inaugural Country Now Awards.

=== 2022–2023: One Thing at a Time ===
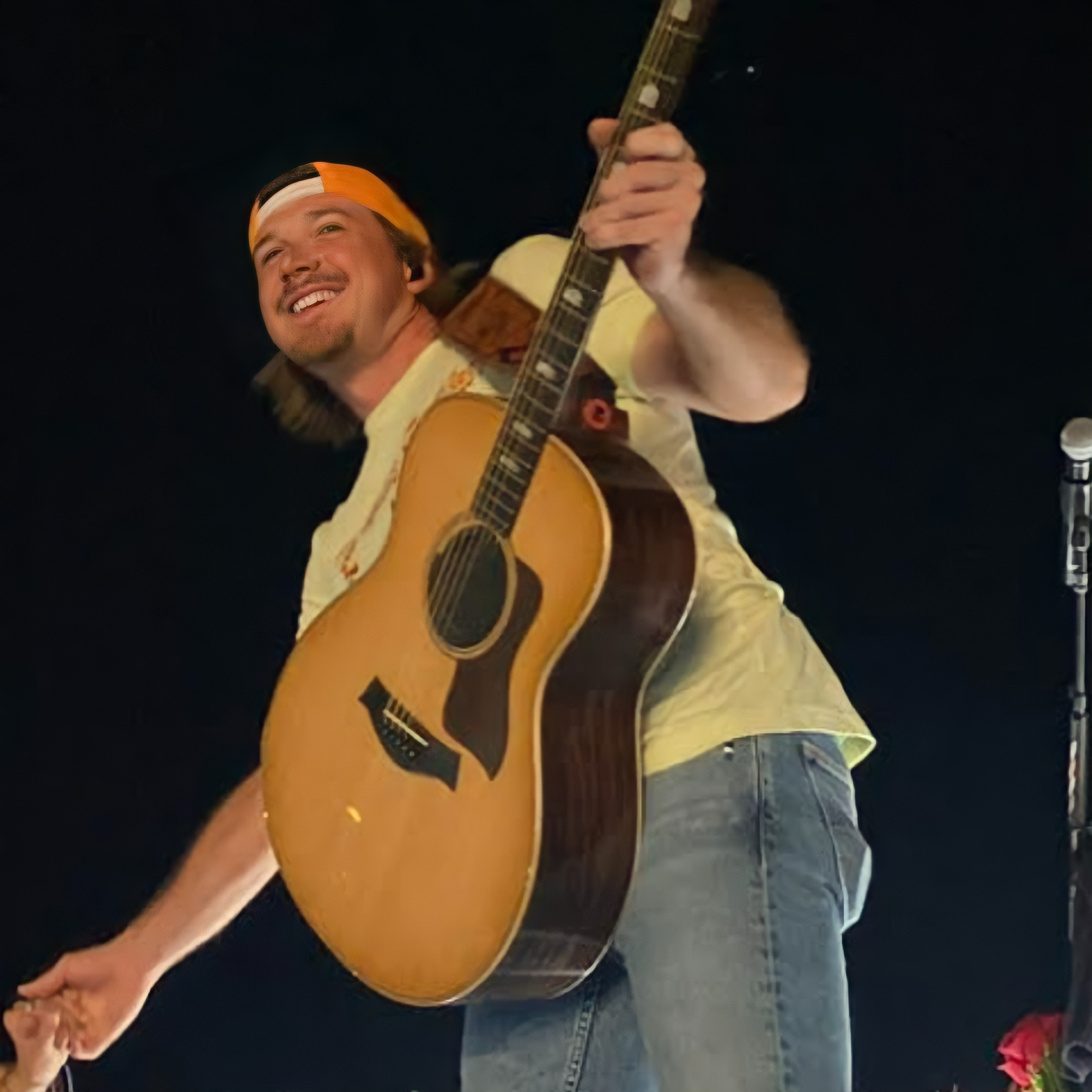
Wallen performing in 2022

Wallen surged in popularity in 2022, continued to release new music, and broke various chart records. The Dangerous Tour that consisted of various arenas and amphitheaters sold-out entirely. After previously teasing new music, Wallen released his first song of 2022 on April 15, being "Don't Think Jesus". The respective song was released as a promotional single and would serve as the lead single from his at-the-time not revealed third studio album. On May 13, the promotional single "You Proof" was released. becoming Wallen's third top ten entry on the Billboard Hot 100 and first to reach the top five; both "You Proof" and "Thought You Should Know" topped the country charts. Wallen also collaborated with rapper Lil Durk on the song "Broadway Girls", a top-fifteen hit on the Hot 100; he also performed the song live with Durk at MLK Freedom Fest in Nashville, Tennessee. Wallen was a co-writer on the Tyler Joe Miller single "Wild as Her", released in February 2022, and the Keith Urban single "Brown Eyes Baby, released in July 2022. In December 2022, Wallen released a sampler EP titled One Thing at a Time (Sampler), featuring three songs he had been working on up until this point, titled "One Thing at a Time", "Tennessee Fan" and "Days That End in Why". In 2023, Wallen expanded to stadiums with his One Night at a Time World Tour, and would release his third studio album One Thing at a Time on March 3, 2023. One Thing at a Time would debut atop the Billboard 200 and spend its first 12 weeks at number-one, blocking numerous albums from the top-spot and ending as the most-popular album on the Billboard 200 in 2023.

On April 23, 2023, at Vaught–Hemingway Stadium in Oxford, Mississippi, just minutes before Wallen was set to perform, Wallen announced that he wouldn't be able to perform due to losing his voice. Fans were directed to receive refunds at their points of purchase. In May 2023, Wallen was featured on the song "Stand by Me" from Lil Durk's eighth studio album Almost Healed, marking their second collaboration. Wallen was a co-writer on the 2023 single "Fixer Upper" by Dallas Smith. Throughout 2023, Wallen released various singles, those being "Last Night", "One Thing at a Time", "Everything I Love", "Thinkin' Bout Me", and "Man Made a Bar".

=== 2024: Stand Alone ten-year anniversary ===
On January 26, 2024, Panacea Records released a deluxe 10th anniversary edition of Wallen's 2015's extended play (EP), Stand Alone that includes eight previously unreleased songs. These songs were recorded in the same sessions as the original songs on Stand Alone. Before the release of the 10th anniversary album, Wallen released a statement on his Instagram page, saying that the release of this album was happening "against his wishes". Wallen released a song, called "Spin You Around (1/24)", an acoustic re-recording of the original, in response to the album's release.

On March 3, he shared performances as part of his Abbey Road Sessions and performed a new song, titled "Lies Lies Lies". On May 2, Wallen announced his next single, titled "I Had Some Help" (with Post Malone), to which was released on May 10, and debuted atop the Billboard Hot 100 chart. Wallen was featured on the Moneybagg Yo single, "Whiskey Whiskey". In September 2024, Wallen announced that his second single for his-then upcoming and untitled fourth studio album, called "Love Somebody", to which was released on October 18. The song debuted at number one on the Billboard Hot 100 chart, becoming his third number-one and second debut. Wallen was nominated for seven awards at the 58th Annual Country Music Association Awards, with his only win being the prestigious Entertainer of the Year award. Wallen was not in attendance to accept and the presenter, Jeff Bridges, jokingly accepted on his behalf. On November 15, Wallen would feature on an enhanced version of "Neon Moon" by Brooks & Dunn. On December 31, Wallen surprise released a single that he had previously teased on his Instagram account, titled "Smile."

=== 2025–present: I'm the Problem ===
On January 24, 2025, Wallen announced his fourth studio album, titled I'm the Problem, alongside a tour of the same name, and the release of the title track, which was previously teased on his Instagram account as "I Guess". The title track released on January 31, while the album has been announced with a release date of May 16, and will include 37 songs. In March 2025, Wallen released two promotional singles, "Just in Case" and "I'm a Little Crazy". On March 29, Wallen was the musical guest on Saturday Night Live, and performed the title track, along with "Just in Case". During his performance, there was a television in the background that displayed several titles for unreleased songs on the album, along with their track number. Any features were blurred out, including the artist featured on "Come Back as a Redneck", which was previously teased on Wallen's Instagram. In April 2025, Wallen teased an upcoming song seemingly titled, "I Ain't Comin' Back" to his Instagram story with the caption "Might put this one out next but gotta check with the other artist on it first", confirming that it is a collaboration.

On April 15, 2025, Wallen announced his next single "I Ain't Comin' Back" featuring Post Malone which released on April 18, 2025. This will be their second collaboration in less than a year following "I Had Some Help". Wallen also confirmed through a X reply that "What I Want", an upcoming song on the album, will be a female duet, a first for Wallen. Rumors flew about who would be the female collaboration, leading Wallen to take to his Instagram story to announce that he had not seen anyone guess the collaborator correctly. However, on April 15, 2025, Canadian pop singer Tate McRae posted an Instagram story of a jersey with Tennessee Volunteers colors, with "T8" across the front and "MW", Morgan Wallen's logo, where the Tennessee logo would normally be. This led to speculation that the collaboration would be with McRae. On April 16, Wallen revealed the full tracklist for I'm the Problem, confirming that Tate McRae will be featured, alongside Eric Church, Hardy, Post Malone, and Ernest.

On May 1, SiriusXM would announce that Wallen would have his own limited run channel on their radio, entitled Morgan Wallen Radio. The channel being limited run, would begin at May 1 and conclude on May 31, 2025. Curated by Wallen himself, Morgan Wallen Radio features some of Wallen's most popular songs, his at-the-time most recently released songs, some of his personal favorites by other artists, and after May 16, every track from I'm the Problem. On May 5, Wallen announced the final single, "Superman", to be released on May 9. The song was written about Wallen's son, Indigo, and was previously teased on Wallen's social media to a positive response. On May 16, Wallen would release his highly anticipated fourth studio album I'm the Problem. The fourth track from the album, the Tate McRae duet "What I Want", was released as a single alongside the album's release.

I'm the Problem would debut atop the US Billboard 200 chart dated May 25, 2025, moving 493,000 album-equivalent units (including 133,000 from pure album sales). This became Wallen's third consecutive number one album on the respective chart and extended his record as the country artist with the most debuts atop the US Billboard 200. On the US Billboard Hot 100 dated May 31, 2025, Wallen had 37 simultaneous entries on the respective chart—36 being from I'm the Problem while the additional charting track was "I Had Some Help", his duet with Post Malone. The only track from the respective album to not chart was "Lies Lies Lies", being unable to chart due to Billboard's recurrent rule. Twenty-nine of the 37 tracks debuted on the US Billboard Hot 100 that week, causing Wallen to expand his total career chart entries on the respective chart from 76 to 105. This caused Wallen to become the first country music artist to earn at least 100 entries on the respective chart, and the first to simultaneously chart six songs within the top-ten of the respective chart. The six songs were "What I Want" (debut at No. 1; becoming Wallen's fourth number one), "Just in Case" (at No. 2), "I'm the Problem" (at No. 3), "I Got Better" (debut at No. 7), "Superman" (at No. 8), and "Love Somebody" (at No. 10).

== Business ventures ==
=== Morgan Wallen's This Bar & Tennessee Kitchen ===
On June 1, 2024, Wallen would open Morgan Wallen's This Bar & Tennessee Kitchen. The bar and live-music venue was supposed to open on Memorial Day weekend but was delayed due to final health inspections being needed. His first bar, which has six-stories, serves as a restaurant and music venue, is located at 107 Fourth Avenue North in downtown Nashville, Tennessee. Billboard noted that Wallen's bar is located adjacent to the Ryman Auditorium building, and would reveal that the bar is a partnership between Wallen and the TC Restaurant Group—the latter of which would license Wallen's name for the project. Wallen partnered with Chef Tomasz Wosiak to help curate the restaurant menu, of which consists of various southern staples, bar food, and some of Wallen's mother's personal recipes.

Predating the finished bar, Nashville Post would reveal on February 15, 2024, that the bar would be 30,000 square-feet, will consist of six bar areas, three live music areas, a gift shop, and a rooftop deck. Nashville Post would additionally reveal that the bar sits behind Dierks Bentley's Whiskey Row bar, and that TCRG properties would pay 10.2 million dollars for the property in May 2022, in preparation for the bar.

=== The Ryl Company ===
In 2022, Wallen would partner with beverage executive Blodin Ukella to create The Ryl Company, a flavored iced tea company.

== Personal life ==
In 2016, Wallen began a relationship with influencer KT Smith, and they became engaged several months later. They separated in 2019, which Smith said was due to Wallen's infidelity. Their son was born several months after their breakup. Wallen has also been romantically involved with influencer Paige Lorenze, country singer Megan Moroney, and television personality Kristin Cavallari. He is currently believed to be single, saying in a recent interview, "I had a girlfriend for a while. Not recently. That was the last one I had. I don't have anybody right now. It's kind of hard. Just how busy I've been. I got a son; an album, a tour; I've got all these things I do... It's really hard for me to make time for that. I want to, though. I think I'm coming up on my 'settle down phase.' We'll see. I'm not in a hurry."

=== Legal issues ===
In May 2020, Wallen was arrested and charged with public intoxication and disorderly conduct after leaving Kid Rock's bar in Nashville after reportedly kicking glass items inside the bar when he was told to leave, as well as getting into multiple verbal altercations with passersby outside. The case was later dismissed.

On April 7, 2024, Wallen was arrested after throwing a chair off the roof of Eric Church's newly opened Nashville bar, Chief's. He was charged with three counts of felony reckless endangerment and one count of misdemeanor disorderly conduct after the chair landed near two police officers. In December 2024, Wallen pleaded guilty to two misdemeanor counts of reckless endangerment, with the other two charges dismissed, and was sentenced to seven days in a DUI education center and two years of supervised probation.

== Discography ==
- If I Know Me (2018)
- Dangerous: The Double Album (2021)
- One Thing at a Time (2023)
- I'm the Problem (2025)

== Tours ==
Headlining

- The Dangerous Tour (2022)
- One Night at a Time World Tour (2023–2024) (with Bailey Zimmerman, Ernest, Hardy, and Parker McCollum)
- I'm the Problem Tour (2025)
- Still the Problem Tour (2026)
- Last Time I Checked Tour (2027)

Opening

- What Makes You Country Tour (2018) (with Luke Bryan)
- Can't Say I Ain't Country Tour (2019) (with Florida Georgia Line)
- Beer Never Broke My Heart Tour (2019) (with Luke Combs)

== Awards and nominations ==
Year	Association	Category	Nominated work	Result	Ref.
2019	CMT Music Awards	Breakthrough Video of the Year	"Whiskey Glasses"	Nominated	
2019	Country Music Association Awards	New Artist of the Year	Himself	Nominated	
2020	Academy of Country Music Awards	New Male Artist of the Year	Himself	Nominated	
2020	Country Music Association Awards	New Artist of the Year	Himself	Won	
2020	iHeartRadio Music Awards	Country Song of The Year	"Whiskey Glasses"	Nominated	
2020	iHeartRadio Music Awards	Best New Country Artist	Himself	Won	
2020	Billboard Music Awards	Top Country Song	"Whiskey Glasses"	Nominated	
2020	Billboard Music Awards	Top Country Album	If I Know Me	Nominated	
2020	CMT Music Awards	Male Video of the Year	"Chasin' You (Dream Video)"	Nominated	
2020	American Music Awards	Favorite Male Artist-Country	Himself	Nominated	
2020	American Music Awards	Favorite Album-Country	If I Know Me	Nominated	
2021	Billboard Music Awards	Top Song Sales Artist	Himself	Nominated	
2021	Billboard Music Awards	Top Country Artist	Himself	Won	
2021	Billboard Music Awards	Top Country Male Artist	Himself	Won	
2021	Billboard Music Awards	Top Country Album	Dangerous: The Double Album	Won	
2021	Billboard Music Awards	Top Country Song	"Chasin' You"	Nominated	
2021	Country Music Association Awards	Album of the Year	Dangerous: The Double Album	Nominated	
2021	American Music Awards	Favorite Male Artist-Country	Himself	Nominated	
2021	American Music Awards	Favorite Album-Country	Dangerous: The Double Album	Nominated	
2021	Country Now Awards	Favorite Male Artist	Himself	Won	
2021	Country Now Awards	Favorite Album	Dangerous: The Double Album	Won	
2022	Academy of Country Music Awards	Album of the Year	Dangerous: The Double Album	Won	
2022	Academy of Country Music Awards	Song of the Year	"7 Summers"	Nominated	
2022	Academy of Country Music Awards	Male Artist of the Year	Himself	Nominated	
2022	Country Music Association Awards	Entertainer of the Year	Himself	Nominated	
2022	Country Music Association Awards	Male Vocalist of the Year	Himself	Nominated	
2022	American Music Awards	Favorite Male Country Artist	Himself	Won	
2022	American Music Awards	Favorite Country Song	"Wasted on You"	Won	
2023	ARIA Music Awards	Best International Artist	Himself	Nominated	
2023	Academy of Country Music Awards	Male Artist of the Year	Himself	Won	
2023	Academy of Country Music Awards	Artist-Songwriter of the Year	Himself	Nominated	
2023	Academy of Country Music Awards	Entertainer of the Year	Himself	Nominated	
2023	Academy of Country Music Awards	Song of the Year	"Sand in My Boots"	Nominated	
2023	Country Music Association Awards	Entertainer of the Year	Himself	Nominated	
2023	Country Music Association Awards	Male Vocalist of the Year	Himself	Nominated	
2023	Country Music Association Awards	Album of the Year	One Thing at a Time	Nominated	
2023	Billboard Music Awards	Top Artist	Himself	Nominated	
2023	Billboard Music Awards	Top Billboard 200 Artist	Himself	Nominated	
2023	Billboard Music Awards	Top Radio Songs Artist	Himself	Nominated	
2023	Billboard Music Awards	Top Song Sales Artist	Himself	Nominated	
2023	Billboard Music Awards	Top Billboard Global 200 Artist	Himself	Nominated	
2023	Billboard Music Awards	Top Streaming Songs Artist	Himself	Won	
2023	Billboard Music Awards	Top Country Artist	Himself	Won	
2023	Billboard Music Awards	Top Male Country Artist	Himself	Won	
2023	Billboard Music Awards	Top Male Artist	Himself	Won	
2023	Billboard Music Awards	Top Hot 100 Artist	Himself	Won	
2023	Billboard Music Awards	Billboard Music Award for Top Country Touring Artist	Himself	Won	
2023	Billboard Music Awards	Top Country Album	One Thing at a Time	Won	
2023	Billboard Music Awards	Top Billboard 200 Album	One Thing at a Time	Won	
2023	Billboard Music Awards	Top Streaming Song	"Last Night"	Won	
2023	Billboard Music Awards	Top Country Song	"Last Night"	Won	
2023	Billboard Music Awards	Top Hot 100 Song	"Last Night"	Won	
2024	Academy of Country Music Awards	Male Artist of the Year	Himself	Nominated	
2024	Academy of Country Music Awards	Artist-Songwriter of the Year	Himself	Nominated	
2024	Academy of Country Music Awards	Entertainer of the Year	Himself	Nominated	
2024	Academy of Country Music Awards	Album of the Year	One Thing at a Time	Nominated	
2024	Academy of Country Music Awards	Song of the Year	"Last Night"	Nominated	
2024	Academy of Country Music Awards	Music Event of the Year	"Man Made a Bar"	Nominated	
2024	Country Music Association Awards	Entertainer of the Year	Himself	Won	
2024	Country Music Association Awards	Male Vocalist of the Year	Himself	Nominated	
2024	Country Music Association Awards	Single of the Year	"I Had Some Help"	Nominated	
2024	Country Music Association Awards	Song of the Year	"I Had Some Help"	Nominated	
2024	Country Music Association Awards	Music Video of the Year	"I Had Some Help"	Nominated	
2024	Country Music Association Awards	Musical Event of the Year	"I Had Some Help"	Nominated	
2024	Country Music Association Awards	Musical Event of the Year	"Man Made a Bar"	Nominated	
2025	Grammy Awards	Best Country Song	"I Had Some Help"	Nominated	
2025	Grammy Awards	Best Country Duo/Group Performance	"I Had Some Help"	Nominated	
2025	Academy of Country Music Awards	Male Artist of the Year	Himself	Nominated	
2025	Academy of Country Music Awards	Artist-Songwriter of the Year	Himself	Nominated	
2025	Academy of Country Music Awards	Entertainer of the Year	Himself	Nominated	
2025	Academy of Country Music Awards	Single of the Year	"I Had Some Help"	Nominated	
2025	Academy of Country Music Awards	Music Event of the Year	"I Had Some Help"	Nominated	
2025	Academy of Country Music Awards	Song of the Year	"I Had Some Help"	Nominated	
2025	American Music Awards	Song of the Year	"I Had Some Help"	Nominated	
2025	American Music Awards	Collaboration of the Year	"I Had Some Help"	Nominated	
2025	American Music Awards	Favorite Country Song	"I Had Some Help"	Won	
2025	American Music Awards	Artist of the Year	Himself	Nominated	
2025	American Music Awards	Favorite Touring Artist	Himself	Nominated	
2025	American Music Awards	Favorite Country Male Artist	Himself	Nominated	
2025	Country Music Association Awards	Entertainer of the Year	Himself	Nominated	
2025	Country Music Association Awards	Male Vocalist of the Year	Himself	Nominated	
2025	Country Music Association Awards	Album of the Year	I'm the Problem	Nominated	
2026	Academy of Country Music Awards	Album of the Year	I'm the Problem	Nominated	
2026	Academy of Country Music Awards	Entertainer of the Year	Himself	Nominated	
2026	Academy of Country Music Awards	Artist-Songwriter of the Year	Himself	Nominated	
2026	American Music Awards	Artist of the Year	Himself	Nominated	
2026	American Music Awards	Best Male Country Artist	Himself	Won	
2026	American Music Awards	Album of the Year	I'm The Problem	Nominated	
2026	American Music Awards	Best Country Album	I'm The Problem	Nominated	
2026	American Music Awards	Song of the Year	"I'm The Problem"	Nominated	
2026	American Music Awards	Collaboration of the Year	"What I Want" (with Tate McRae)	Nominated	
2026	American Music Awards	Best Country Song	"Just In Case"	Nominated	
