= Spin You Around =

2015 song by Morgan Wallen

- Cover art for the 2024 version of the song

Promotional single by Morgan Wallen

from the EP Stand Alone
- Released: August 24, 2015
- Genre: Country
- Length: 3:32
- Label: Panacea
- Songwriters: Morgan Wallen; Sergio Sanchez; Paul Trust
- Producer: Trust

Morgan Wallen singles chronology
"Spin You Around" (2015)	"The Way I Talk" (2016)

Lyric video
- "Spin You Around" on YouTube

"Spin You Around" is a song by American country music singer Morgan Wallen from his EP Stand Alone (2015). It was written by Wallen, Sergio Sanchez and Paul Trust. Bass, drums and production for the track were performed by Paul Trust with Dominick Frost contributing guitar and Morgan Wallen contributing vocals.

== "Spin You Around (1/24)" ==
On January 26, 2024, Morgan Wallen released a re-recorded version of the song, titled "Spin You Around (1/24)", as a promotional single. An acoustic version, it was recorded in the week of its release in Nashville, Tennessee with help from Joey Moi and Bryan Sutton. Wallen also designed the artwork for the song while in the woods on a duck-hunting trip. The purpose of this song being re-recorded was to get fans to stream this instead of a deluxe version of his EP Stand Alone that had been released that same day by his previous record label against his wishes.

== Charts ==
Chart performance for "Spin You Around (1/24)"
Chart (2024)	Peak position
Australia Country Hot 50 (The Music)	13
Canada Hot 100 (Billboard)	13
Global 200 (Billboard)	67
New Zealand Hot Singles (RMNZ)	10
US Billboard Hot 100	24
US Country Airplay (Billboard)	56
US Hot Country Songs (Billboard)	5

=== Year-end charts ===
Year-end chart performance for "Spin You Around (1/24)"
Chart (2024)	Position
Canada (Canadian Hot 100)	98
US Hot Country Songs (Billboard)	42

== Certifications ==
Certifications for "Spin You Around"
Region	Certification	Certified units/sales
Canada (Music Canada)	2× Platinum	160,000^{‡}
New Zealand (RMNZ)	Gold	15,000^{‡}
United States (RIAA)	3× Platinum	3,000,000^{‡}
^{‡} Sales+streaming figures based on certification alone.
