= Stand Alone (EP) =

EP by Morgan Wallen
- Released: August 24, 2015
- Genre: Country; Southern rock
- Length: 19:06
- Label: Panacea
- Producer: Paul Trust

Morgan Wallen chronology
Stand Alone (2015)	The Way I Talk (2016)

Cover for 10th anniversary deluxe edition

Stand Alone is the debut extended play (EP) by American country music singer Morgan Wallen. It was released on August 24, 2015, through Panacea Records. The production on the album was handled by Paul Trust with songwriting by Trust, Wallen, and Sergio Sanchez.

The single "Spin You Around" was certified 3× Platinum by the Recording Industry Association of America (RIAA) in 2025.

On January 26, 2024, Panacea Records released a 10th anniversary edition of Stand Alone that included an additional eight songs, which were recorded in the same sessions as the original five tracks. Before the release of the 10th anniversary edition, Wallen released a statement on his Instagram page saying that the re-release was happening "against his wishes" and that he had re-recorded "Spin You Around" and was releasing it as "Spin You Around (1/24)".

== Commercial performance ==
Stand Alone peaked at number 154 on the US Billboard 200 and number 25 on the US Top Country Albums chart following the release of the 10th anniversary edition in early 2024.

== Track listing ==
All tracks are written by Morgan Wallen, Paul Trust and Sergio Sanchez.

Stand Alone track listing
No.	Title	Length
1.	"Spin You Around"	3:32
2.	"Sleep When We're Dead"	4:21
3.	"Stand Alone"	4:09
4.	"Man of the South"	3:33
5.	"Yin Yang Girl"	3:27
Total length:		19:06

10th anniversary edition track listing
No.	Title	Length
1.	"Going Down"	3:33
2.	"Scared to Live Without You"	3:44
3.	"2 of Us Alone"	3:46
4.	"Got It Made"	3:43
5.	"What's Your Story"	4:07
6.	"Spin You Around"	3:32
7.	"Afterglow"	3:36
8.	"Heaven Can Take a Backseat"	3:42
9.	"Sleep When We're Dead"	4:21
10.	"Stand Alone"	4:09
11.	"Man of the South"	3:33
12.	"Yin Yang Girl"	3:27
13.	"Bonfire Jam"	3:38
Total length:		48:51

== Charts ==
Chart performance for Stand Alone
Chart (2024)	Peak position
US Billboard 200	154
US Top Country Albums (Billboard)	25

== Certifications ==
Certifications for "Stand Alone"
Region	Certification	Certified units/sales
United States (RIAA)	Gold	500,000^{‡}
^{‡} Sales+streaming figures based on certification alone.
