= The Way I Talk =

Single by Morgan Wallen

from the album If I Know Me
- Released: September 12, 2016
- Genre: Country
- Length: 3:28
- Label: Big Loud
- Songwriters: Jessi Alexander; Ben Hayslip; Chase McGill
- Producer: Joey Moi

Morgan Wallen singles chronology
"Spin You Around" (2015)	"The Way I Talk" (2016)	"Up Down" (2017)

Music video
- "The Way I Talk" on YouTube

"The Way I Talk" is a song by American country music singer Morgan Wallen. The song was written by Jessi Alexander, Ben Hayslip, and Chase McGill, and was released as Wallen's debut single and the lead single from his debut studio album If I Know Me.

== Background ==
The song was written by Ben Hayslip, Jessi Alexander, and Chase McGill, but Wallen felt a personal connection to the song upon hearing it. He stated "It's about "the things that I'm proud of and the way that I live, and it was just a perfect match to me".

== Critical reception ==
Whiskey Riff gave a favourable review of the song, highlighting the lyric "Man it ain't my fault, I just live the way I talk" stating they "wish more people would live that way as well". The Country Note noted Wallen's "dynamic vocal delivery", stating the track "features a sound straight out of the modern South, combining elements of both country and rock".

== Commercial performance ==
"The Way I Talk" reached peaks of number 35 on the Billboard Hot Country Songs chart, number 30 on the Country Airplay chart, and number 50 on the Canada Country chart. This marked Wallen's first entries on each chart. It has been certified 4× Platinum by Music Canada and RIAA.

== Music video ==
The music video was directed by TK McKamy and premiered on April 6, 2017. The video featured Wallen and his friends doing various activities such as chasing chickens or boxing for fun.

== Track listing ==
Digital download – single

1. "The Way I Talk" – 3:28

== Charts ==
=== Weekly charts ===
Chart (2016–2017)	Peak position
Canada Country (Billboard)	50
US Country Airplay (Billboard)	30
US Hot Country Songs (Billboard)	35

=== Year-end charts ===
Chart (2017)	Position
US Hot Country Songs (Billboard)	79

== Certifications ==
Region	Certification	Certified units/sales
Canada (Music Canada)	4× Platinum	320,000^{‡}
United States (RIAA)	4× Platinum	4,000,000^{‡}
^{‡} Sales+streaming figures based on certification alone.

== Release history ==
Region	Date	Format	Label	Ref.
United States	September 12, 2016	Country radio	Big Loud	

== Extended play ==
The Way I Talk

EP by Morgan Wallen
- Released: July 29, 2016
- Genre: Country
- Length: 18:16
- Label: Big Loud

Morgan Wallen chronology
Stand Alone (2015)	The Way I Talk (2016)	If I Know Me (2018)

Singles from The Way I Talk
- 1. "The Way I Talk" Released: September 12, 2016; 2. "Whiskey Glasses" Released: July 30, 2018

The Way I Talk is the second extended play (EP) by the American country singer Morgan Wallen. It was released on July 29, 2016, through Big Loud. The Way I Talk is a country extended play that consists of five tracks and spawned two singles: the title track and "Whiskey Glasses".

=== Track listing ===
No.	Title	Length
1.	"The Way I Talk"	3:28
2.	"Chain Smokin'"	3:42
3.	"Whiskey Glasses"	3:54
4.	"Stand Out"	3:14
5.	"American Nights"	3:22
