= Whiskey Glasses =

Single by Morgan Wallen

from the album If I Know Me
- Released: July 30, 2018
- Genre: Country
- Length: 3:54
- Label: Big Loud
- Songwriters: Ben Burgess; Kevin Kadish
- Producer: Joey Moi

Morgan Wallen singles chronology
"Up Down" (2017)	"Whiskey Glasses" (2018)	"Chasin' You" (2019)

Music video
- "Whiskey Glasses" on YouTube

"Whiskey Glasses" is a song written by Ben Burgess and Kevin Kadish, and recorded by American country music singer Morgan Wallen. It was first included on his 2016 EP The Way I Talk, and was released as the third single from his 2018 studio album, If I Know Me.

== Background ==
The song was written by Kevin Kadish and Ben Burgess in 2015. Burgess had an idea about writing a song about whiskey glasses in a song-writing session with Kadish. He liked the idea, and came up with the line "I'mma need some whiskey glasses, 'cause I don't wanna see the truth". They decided that the theme should be about someone who turned to drink because of a bad break-up. Burgess then remembered his father who used to say after he had too much to drink: "Poor Pappy ... oh, pour your Pappy a drink", which became the start of the song as "Poor me, pour me another drink".

The song was pitched to Wallen who then recorded the song with producer Joey Moi. It was first released in the summer of 2018, but only became a hit in 2019.

== Commercial performance ==
"Whiskey Glasses" reached No. 1 on Billboard Country Airplay chart dated June 8, 2019, after topping the Hot Country Songs chart. The song was certified 13× Platinum by the RIAA on December 16, 2025, his highest certified single to date. It has sold 391,000 copies in the United States as of March 2020.

== Music video ==
The music video for "Whiskey Glasses" was directed by Justin Clough and premiered in October 2018. In it, Wallen is exhibited as someone who was trying to mend his broken heart through drinking after his girlfriend dumped him, before eventually going to a bar with his friends (including Hardy) and performed a live version of the song.

== Charts ==
=== Weekly charts ===
Weekly chart performance
Chart (2018–2019)	Peak position
Canada Hot 100 (Billboard)	44
Canada Country (Billboard)	1
US Billboard Hot 100	17
US Country Airplay (Billboard)	1
US Hot Country Songs (Billboard)	1
US Rolling Stone Top 100	16

=== Year-end charts ===
Annual chart rankings
Chart (2019)	Position
Canada (Canadian Hot 100)	100
US Billboard Hot 100	52
US Country Airplay (Billboard)	1
US Hot Country Songs (Billboard)	1
US Rolling Stone Top 100	39

Chart (2022)	Position
US Streaming Songs (Billboard)	71

=== Decade-end charts ===
Chart (2010–2019)	Position
US Hot Country Songs (Billboard)	24

== Certifications ==
Region	Certification	Certified units/sales
Canada (Music Canada)	Diamond	800,000^{‡}
New Zealand (RMNZ)	Platinum	30,000^{‡}
United Kingdom (BPI)	Gold	400,000^{‡}
United States (RIAA)	13× Platinum	13,000,000^{‡}
^{‡} Sales+streaming figures based on certification alone.
