= Chasin' You =

Single by Morgan Wallen

from the album If I Know Me
- Released: July 29, 2019
- Genre: Country
- Length: 3:25
- Label: Big Loud
- Songwriters: Jamie Moore; Morgan Wallen; Craig Wiseman
- Producer: Joey Moi

Morgan Wallen singles chronology
"Whiskey Glasses" (2018)	"Chasin' You" (2019)	"Heartless" (2019)

Music video
- "Chasin' You" on YouTube

"Chasin' You" is a song co-written and recorded by American country music singer Morgan Wallen. It was released in July 2019 as the fourth single from his 2018 studio album, If I Know Me. Wallen wrote the song, along with Jamie Moore and Craig Wiseman.

== Commercial performance ==
"Chasin' You" became Wallen's third consecutive number one hit on the Billboard Country Airplay chart dated May 23, 2020, reaching the top in its 42nd week. In December 2020, it was declared the number one song of the year, making it Wallen's second consecutive song to achieve such a distinction. It also reached a peak of number two on the Billboard Hot Country Songs chart and top 20 on the Billboard Hot 100.

As of March 2020, the song has sold 57,000 copies in the United States, and it was certified Diamond by the RIAA on December 16, 2025.

== Music video ==
The music video for "Chasin' You" premiered on January 4, 2019, ahead of its release as a single. Labeled as "Chasin' You (Dream Video)", it was filmed in black and white and shows Wallen driving around Nashville, Tennessee in a convertible.

== Charts ==
=== Weekly charts ===
Chart (2019–2020)	Peak position
Australia Country Hot 50 (TMN)	27
Canada Hot 100 (Billboard)	44
Canada Country (Billboard)	1
US Billboard Hot 100	16
US Country Airplay (Billboard)	1
US Hot Country Songs (Billboard)	2
US Rolling Stone Top 100	21

=== Year-end charts ===
Chart (2019)	Position
US Hot Country Songs (Billboard)	98
Chart (2020)	Position
US Billboard Hot 100	34
US Country Airplay (Billboard)	1
US Hot Country Songs (Billboard)	4

== Certifications ==
Region	Certification	Certified units/sales
Canada (Music Canada)	Diamond	800,000^{‡}
New Zealand (RMNZ)	Platinum	30,000^{‡}
United Kingdom (BPI)	Gold	400,000^{‡}
United States (RIAA)	Diamond	10,000,000^{‡}
^{‡} Sales+streaming figures based on certification alone.
