= If I Know Me (album) =

Studio album by Morgan Wallen
- Released: April 27, 2018
- Recorded: 2017–2018
- Genre: Country
- Length: 45:11
- Label: Big Loud
- Producer: Joey Moi

Morgan Wallen chronology
The Way I Talk (2016)	If I Know Me (2018)	Dangerous: The Double Album (2021)

Singles from If I Know Me
- 1. "The Way I Talk" Released: September 12, 2016; 2. "Up Down" Released: November 27, 2017; 3. "Whiskey Glasses" Released: July 30, 2018; 4. "Chasin' You" Released: July 29, 2019

If I Know Me is the debut studio album by American country music singer Morgan Wallen. It was released on April 27, 2018, through Big Loud. The production on the album was handled by Joey Moi and features a guest appearance by Florida Georgia Line.

If I Know Me was supported by four singles: "The Way I Talk", "Up Down", "Whiskey Glasses", and "Chasin' You". The album peaked at number 10 on the US Billboard 200 and number one on the US Top Country Albums chart. It was certified 4× Platinum by the Recording Industry Association of America (RIAA) in December 2025. The album received positive reviews.

== Singles ==
He released his debut single, "The Way I Talk", on September 12, 2016, and it became a top 30 hit on the Billboard Country Airplay chart. "Up Down" was released as his second single on November 27, 2017. The song, a collaboration with Florida Georgia Line, became a No. 1 hit on the Billboard Country Airplay chart for the week dated June 30, 2018. "Whiskey Glasses" was released as the album's third single on July 30, 2018, and became his second No. 1 hit on the Country Airplay chart. It was also his first to top the Billboard Hot Country Songs chart and reach the top 20 of the Billboard Hot 100. The album's fourth single "Chasin' You" was released to country radio on July 29, 2019, and became his third No. 1 on the Country Airplay chart and also his second single to reach the top 20 on the Billboard Hot 100.

== Commercial performance ==
If I Know Me debuted at number 11 on the US Top Country Albums and number 72 on the US Billboard 200, selling 2,700 copies in the first week. In August 2020, the album reached new peaks at number 13 on the Billboard 200 and number one on the US Top Country Albums chart after a record-breaking 114 weeks; the following year, after the release of Dangerous: The Double Album, it peaked at number 10 on the Billboard 200. On September 4, 2020, the album was certified platinum by the Recording Industry Association of America (RIAA) for combined sales and album-equivalent units of over a million units. As of January 2021, the album had earned 1.7 million album-equivanlent units and has accumulated a total of 2.4 billion on-demand streams in the United States. In December 2025, it was certified 4× Platinum.

== Track listing ==
No.	Title	Writer(s)	Length
1.	"Up Down" (featuring Florida Georgia Line)	Brad Clawson; Michael Hardy; CJ Solar	3:18
2.	"Happy Hour"	Corey Crowder; Hardy; Craig Wiseman	3:20
3.	"Had Me by Halftime"	Hardy; James McNair; Josh Miller; Daniel Ross; Morgan Wallen	2:52
4.	"Whiskey Glasses"	Ben Burgess; Kevin Kadish	3:54
5.	"Whatcha Know 'Bout That"	Hardy; Josh Leo; Cameron Montgomery; Jim Photoglo; Wendy Waldman (Note: Contains a sample of "Fishin' in the Dark" by the Nitty Gritty Dirt Band.); Wiseman	3:15
6.	"Redneck Love Song"	David Garcia; Hardy; Hillary Lindsey; Josh Miller	3:10
7.	"Little Rain"	Matt Dragstrem; Ben Hayslip; Chase McGill	3:27
8.	"If I Know Me"	Hardy; Ernest Keith Smith; Ryan Vojtesak; Wallen	2:38
9.	"Chasin' You"	Jamie Moore; Wallen; Wiseman	3:25
10.	"The Way I Talk"	Jessi Alexander; Hayslip; McGill	3:28
11.	"If I Ever Get You Back"	Dallas Davidson; Dragstrem; Hayslip	2:54
12.	"Gone Girl"	Alexander; Hardy; Montgomery; Deric Ruttan; Wallen	2:43
13.	"Not Good at Not"	Brett Tyler; Wallen; Wiseman	3:02
14.	"Talkin' Tennessee"	Jeff Hyde; Wallen; Wiseman	3:44

== Charts ==
=== Weekly charts ===
Weekly chart performance for If I Know Me
Chart (2018–2021)	Peak position
Australian Albums (ARIA)	53
Canadian Albums (Billboard)	21
US Billboard 200	10
US Top Country Albums (Billboard)	1
US Independent Albums (Billboard)	1

=== Year-end charts ===
Year-end chart performance for If I Know Me
Chart (2018)	Position
US Top Country Albums (Billboard)	44
Chart (2019)	Position
Australian Country Albums (ARIA)	12
US Billboard 200	87
US Top Country Albums (Billboard)	8
Chart (2020)	Position
Australian Country Albums (ARIA)	4
Canadian Albums (Billboard)	42
US Billboard 200	29
US Top Country Albums (Billboard)	3
Chart (2021)	Position
Australian Country Albums (ARIA)	6
Canadian Albums (Billboard)	42
US Billboard 200	36
US Top Country Albums (Billboard)	6
Chart (2022)	Position
US Billboard 200	35
US Independent Albums (Billboard)	4
US Top Country Albums (Billboard)	5
Chart (2023)	Position
Canadian Albums (Billboard)	33
US Billboard 200	34
US Independent Albums (Billboard)	5
US Top Country Albums (Billboard)	8
Chart (2024)	Position
Australian Country Albums (ARIA)	18
US Billboard 200	58
US Independent Albums (Billboard)	8
US Top Country Albums (Billboard)	13
Chart (2025)	Position
US Billboard 200	79
US Top Country Albums (Billboard)	13

== Certifications ==
Certifications for If I Know Me
Region	Certification	Certified units/sales
United States (RIAA)	4× Platinum	4,000,000^{‡}
^{‡} Sales+streaming figures based on certification alone.
