= Up Down (Morgan Wallen song) =

Single by Morgan Wallen featuring Florida Georgia Line

from the album If I Know Me
- Released: November 27, 2017
- Genre: Country; Southern rock
- Length: 3:16
- Label: Big Loud
- Songwriters: Michael Hardy; Brad Clawson; CJ Solar
- Producer: Joey Moi

Morgan Wallen singles chronology
"The Way I Talk" (2016)	"Up Down" (2017)	"Whiskey Glasses" (2018)

Florida Georgia Line singles chronology
"Meant to Be" (2017)	"Up Down" (2017)	"Simple" (2018)

Music video
- "Up Down" on YouTube

"Up Down" is a song written by Michael Hardy, CJ Solar, and Brad Clawson. It was recorded by American country music singer Morgan Wallen along with country music duo Florida Georgia Line. The song is Wallen's second single release overall, and it appears on his 2018 studio album If I Know Me. "Up Down" has reached number one on the Billboard Country Airplay chart and number five on the Hot Country Songs chart. It also reached number 49 on the Hot 100 chart. The song was certified 5× platinum by the Recording Industry Association of America (RIAA), and has sold 267,000 units as of August 2018. It achieved similar chart success in Canada, reaching number one on the Canada Country chart.

An accompanying music video for the song, directed by Justin Clough, features Wallen and both members of Florida Georgia Line partying on a beach, and in concert.

== Composition ==
Hardy, a close friend of Wallen's, wrote the song with Brad Clawson (son of Nashville songwriter Rodney Clawson) and CJ Solar. Originally Wallen had intended to sing the song solo, but he contacted Florida Georgia Line to ask for their opinion of the song, and the duo chose to sing guest vocals on it. Wallen said that he identified with the song's theme of having a good time in a small town because of his own upbringing.

== Commercial performance ==
The song was certified platinum on July 31, 2018, and 2× platinum on February 25, 2020, for two million combined sales and streams units. It had sold 333,000 copies in the United States as of September 2018.

== Music video ==
The song's music video features Wallen and both members of Florida Georgia Line partying at Perdido Pass in Orange Beach, Alabama and in concert at The Wharf Amphitheater on Orange Beach, Alabama. It was directed by Justin Clough.

== Parodies ==
In July 2018, country music parodist Cledus T. Judd released a parody of the song titled "(Weight's Goin') Up Down, Up Down". The parody has its own music video, directed by Judd himself and featuring members of his family.

== Charts ==
=== Weekly charts ===
Chart (2017–2018)	Peak position
Canada Hot 100 (Billboard)	89
Canada Country (Billboard)	1
US Billboard Hot 100	49
US Country Airplay (Billboard)	1
US Hot Country Songs (Billboard)	5

=== Year-end charts ===
Chart (2018)	Position
US Country Airplay (Billboard)	20
US Hot Country Songs (Billboard)	10

== Certifications ==
Region	Certification	Certified units/sales
Canada (Music Canada)	4× Platinum	320,000^{‡}
New Zealand (RMNZ)	Gold	15,000^{‡}
United States (RIAA)	5× Platinum	5,000,000^{‡}
^{‡} Sales+streaming figures based on certification alone.
