= Paul Trust =

American songwriter and record producer

Paul Trust is an American songwriter and record producer who has worked with recording artists such as MNQN, Starset, Morgan Wallen, Say Anything, Diecast, Endo, Jesse Strange, Atom Smash, Downplay, and The Cleopatra Complex. His work has appeared in major movie soundtracks including Dracula 2000, Alone in the Dark, and The Cave. He is also known for writing and producing a large body of music for network sports. His music has appeared in The NFL on CBS, The NFL Today, CBS March Madness, The PGA on CBS, The Masters, Super Bowl 50, AFC Playoff games, The WWE and NCAA College football and basketball. In addition, he wrote, produced and mixed "We Own The Night", the 2016 promotional theme for Thursday Night Football. In 2011, he wrote the song "Stand Up" which was recorded by the American Idol semi-finalist, James Durbin, and produced by Howard Benson, and was part of an NFL compilation album entitled Official Gameday Music of the NFL Vol. 2.
