= Atom Smash =

Hard rock band from Miami, Florida, USA

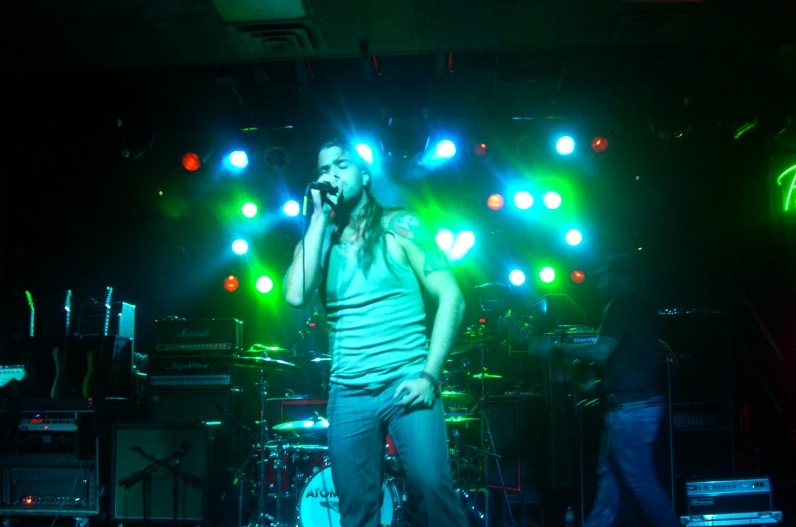
- Atom Smash performing in 2009.

Background information
- Origin: Miami, Florida
- Genres: Hard rock, post-grunge, alternative metal
- Years active: 2006–present
- Labels: Jive
- Members: Serg Gabriel Sanchez; Mark "Taco" Annino; Luke "Cowboy" Rice; "Crazy" Dave Carrey
- Past members: Alex "Z" Zilinski; Arnold Nese

Atom Smash is a Miami, Florida-based hard rock band consisting of Serg Gabriel Sanchez (vocals), Mark "Taco" Annino (drums), Luke "Cowboy" Rice (guitar, vocals) and "Crazy" Dave Carrey (bass) Formerly signed to Jive Records.

== History ==
The group formed in 2006 by Serg Gabriel Sanchez and Producer Paul Trust. Paul Trust introduced Serg to Dr. Bill Ray owner of Panacea Records. Dr. Bill began to help develop the group. Guitarist Alex Zilinski of Austria Europe joined the band later that year. Bassist Arnold Nese jumped on board in 2007. The band wrote and recorded music which was then presented to Dirk Hemsath owner of Doghouse Records and The Working Group Artist Management. Hemsath began to manage the group in 2008. That same year drummer Mark Annino who would later be nicknamed "Taco" joined the band. It was that year that they would finally be named "Atom Smash" a title that was recommended by Hemsath. 2009 was the band's first year on tour in support of there independently released single "Sacrifice". After 200 performances nationwide the band was involved in a car accident in St. Louis Missouri that left the tour van on fire but the members injury free. The groups luck would change after Hemsath put Sergio in contact with producer David Bendeth. A demo of the song "Do her wrong" was then presented to Jeff Fenster who at the time was A&R for Jive Records. January 2010 the band signed a record deal with Jive Records and began to record their album with David Bendeth and Paul Trust. In June 2010 Luke Rice (A.K.A. Cowboy) was announced as second guitarist; solidifying the lineup for the remainder of the year. The band released their debut album "Love is in the Missile" on Aug. 31 2010. "Do Her Wrong" charted at #30 on the Mainstream Rock chart and hit number 1 on Sirius Xm's Octane channel. Atom Smash was named "Best Recently Signed Band" by Maxim.com music columnist Allison Hagendorf and has toured or performed with Drowning Pool, Buckcherry, Filter, RED, Cavo, Saliva, Halestorm, Tantric, Black Bourbon Devils and 12 Stones. "Sacrifice" was the theme for the WWE Hell in a Cell PPV in 2010. The song Sacrifice was also used during the NBC WWE Wrestlemania XXV telecast highlighting the triple threat match between Edge, John Cena and the Big Show for the World Heavyweight Championship.

In early 2011 only 4 months after the album's release and 25,000 units sold the band was released from Jive records and is currently an independent group. The band continues to record and release material.

=== 2011-2012 ===
In late 2011 the band parted ways with The Agency Group and Jive Records. The band's began to work on a second full-length album "Beautiful Alien". The band did about 90% of the producing/mastering by themselves, however the guys did call on the expertise of producer Paul Trust for three songs including the first single. "The World is Ours" is a song dedicated to the rising population of uninspired teens on the verge of suicide. The "Alien" also includes a rendition of Seal's masterpiece "Kiss from a Rose" The new album is slated for digital release in March 2012 with 20+ tour dates announced in support starting March 7, 2012 in their home state of Florida. The 1st single for Beautiful Alien titled "The World Is Ours" which hit the Top 40 pop indicator chart is available on ITunes Amazon, SoundCloud and touch tunes.

=== 2013 ===
After a year break the band decided to reinvent themselves yet again by self producing an album with a very heavy sound called "Summer Swing," which was later renamed to Passage To The Sun. Luke "Cowboy" Rice has taken more leading role on this album producing and writing a majority of the music along with Mark "Taco" Annino. Serg Gabriel Sanchez still writes the band's lyrics and melodies. Those who have heard the album describe it as stylistically unidentifiable and unique for a band that had been known for a more commercial sound. The album was released August 20, 2013. No tours have been booked to support the album. Luke "Cowboy" Rice now lives in his home town of Asheville, NC and Serg Gabriel Sanchez now lives in Knoxville Tennessee.

== Discography ==
Studio albums

- Love Is in the Missile (2010) (Jive Records)
- Beautiful Alien (2012)
- Passage to the Sun (2013)

Extended plays

- Sacrifice EP (2009)
- Kill Me EP (2009)
