= Riley Green discography =

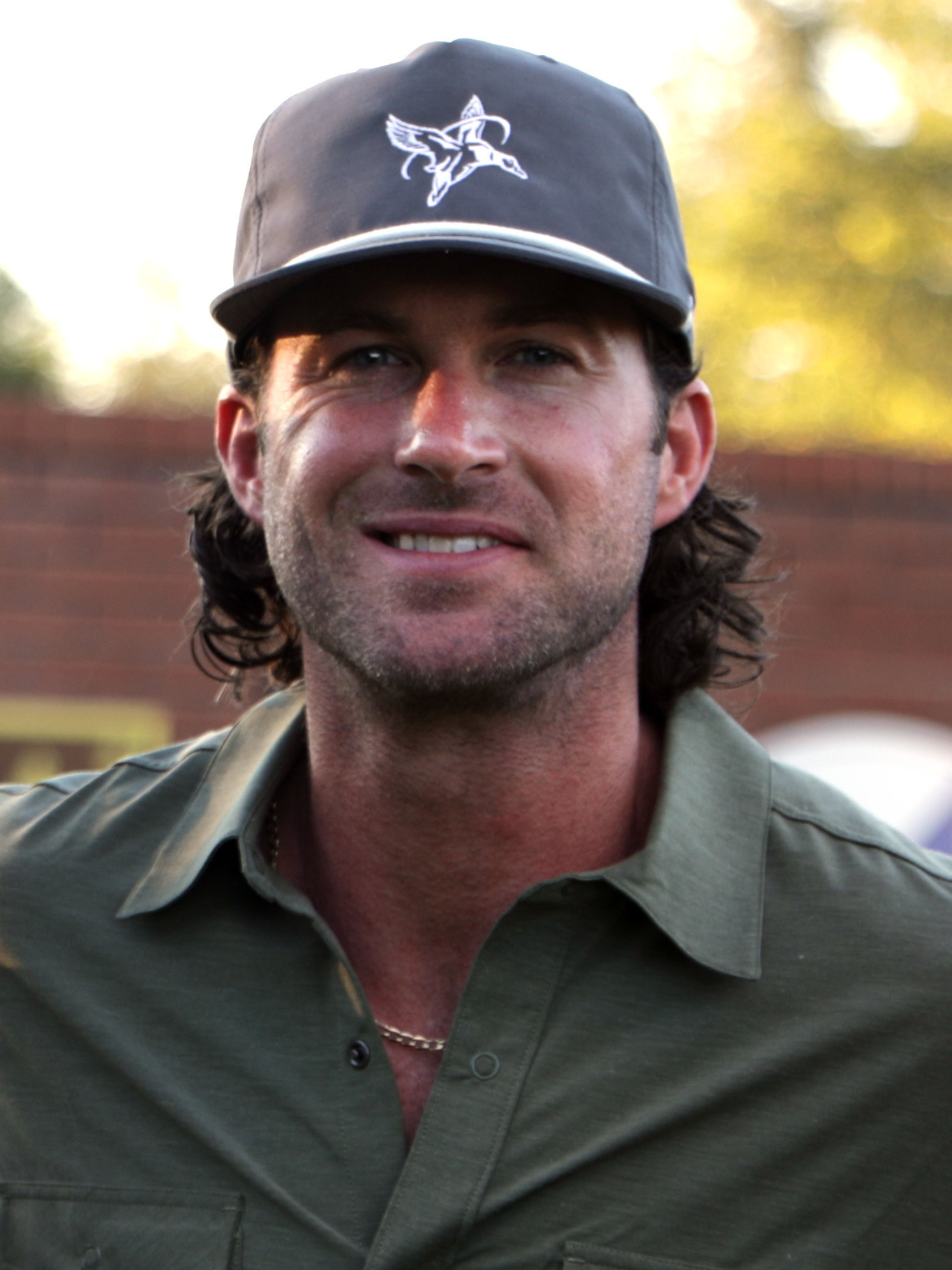
- Green in 2022
- Studio albums: 4
- EPs: 7
- Singles: 9

American country music singer Riley Green has released four studio albums, seven extended plays, and nine singles. Of his albums, Different 'Round Here and Don't Mind If I Do are certified Gold by the Recording Industry Association of America, with his highest peaking albums being Don't Mind If I Do, which peaked at number seven on the Billboard Top Country Albums chart. "Worst Way" and "Don't Mind If I Do" are his highest charting singles, with both reaching number five on the Billboard Hot Country Songs chart.

== Studio albums ==
List of studio albums, with selected details, peak chart positions, and certifications
Title	Details	Peak chart positions					Certifications
Title	Details	US	US Country	AUS	CAN	NZ	Certifications
Different 'Round Here	Release date: September 20, 2019; Label: Nashville Harbor; Format: CD, digital download, streaming	95	11	—	—	—	RIAA: Gold
Ain't My Last Rodeo	Release date: October 13, 2023; Label: Nashville Harbor; Format: CD, digital download, streaming	79	15	—	—	—	
Don't Mind If I Do	Release date: October 18, 2024; Label: Nashville Harbor; Format: CD, digital download, streaming	25	7	—	29	—	RIAA: Platinum
That's Just Me	Release date: September 18, 2026; Label: Nashville Harbor; Format: CD, digital download, streaming	3	2	14	14	37	

== Extended plays ==
List of EPs, with selected details and peak chart positions
Title	Details	Peak chart positions			
Title	Details	US	US Heat.	US Country	US Indie
Outlaws Like Us	Release date: August 18, 2017; Label: Self-released; Format: Digital download, streaming	—	5	—	24
Riley Green	Release date: June 1, 2018; Label: Nashville Harbor; Format: Digital download, streaming	—	—	—	—
In a Truck Right Now	Release date: June 29, 2018; Label: Nashville Harbor; Format: Digital download, streaming	—	3	—	—
Get That Man a Beer	Release date: June 14, 2019; Label: Nashville Harbor; Format: Digital download, streaming	—	8	—	—
Behind the Bar	Release date: July 2, 2021; Label: Nashville Harbor; Format: Digital download, streaming	122	—	18	—
Way Out Here	Release date: April 12, 2024; Label: Nashville Harbor; Format: Digital download, streaming	149	—	29	23
Midtown Sessions	Release date: July 11, 2025; Label: Nashville Harbor; Format: Digital download, streaming	113	—	24	—
"—" denotes releases that did not chart

== Singles ==
=== As lead artist ===
List of singles, with selected peak chart positions and certifications shown
Year	Title	Peak chart positions						Certifications	Album
Year	Title	US	US Country Songs	US Country Airplay	CAN	CAN Country	WW	Certifications	Album
2018	"There Was This Girl"	70	11	3	75	1	—	RIAA: 2× Platinum; ARIA: Gold; MC: 3× Platinum	Different 'Round Here
2019	"In Love by Now"	—	—	52	—	—	—		Different 'Round Here
2019	"I Wish Grandpas Never Died"	66	12	12	95	11	—	RIAA: 3× Platinum; ARIA: Gold; MC: 3× Platinum	Different 'Round Here
2020	"If It Wasn't for Trucks"	—	40	41	—	—	—	RIAA: Gold; MC: Gold	Behind the Bar
2022	"Hell of a Way to Go"	—	50	—	—	—	—	RIAA: Gold	—N/a
2023	"Different 'Round Here" (with Luke Combs)	60	15	2	89	11	—	RIAA: Platinum; MC: 2× Platinum; RMNZ: Gold	Ain't My Last Rodeo
2024	"Damn Good Day to Leave"	— (Note: "Damn Good Day to Leave" did not enter the Billboard Hot 100, but peaked at number 17 on the Bubbling Under Hot 100 chart.)	28	10	—	6	—	MC: Gold	Ain't My Last Rodeo
2025	"Worst Way"	20	5	1	28	1	187	RIAA: 4× Platinum; BPI: Silver; MC: 4× Platinum; RMNZ: Platinum	Don't Mind If I Do
2025	"Don't Mind If I Do" (featuring Ella Langley)	23	5	1	30	1	—	RIAA: 2× Platinum; RMNZ: Gold	Don't Mind If I Do
2026	"Change My Mind"	24	5	2	42	2	—	RIAA: Platinum; MC: Platinum	Don't Mind If I Do
2026	"If I Don't Leave I'm Gonna Stay" (with Carly Pearce)	— (Note: "If I Don't Leave I'm Gonna Stay" did not enter the Billboard Hot 100, but peaked at number 17 on the Bubbling Under Hot 100 chart.)	40	33	—	—	—		Honest Woman
2026	"Think as You Drunk"	31	11	6	48	2	—		That's Just Me
"—" denotes releases that did not chart

=== Promotional singles ===
List of promotional singles, with selected certifications shown
Year	Title	Peak chart positions			Certifications	Album
Year	Title	US	US Country Songs	NZ Hot	Certifications	Album
2018	"Georgia Time"	—	—	—	RIAA: Platinum; MC: Gold	—N/a
2018	"Runnin' with an Angel"	—	—	—		Different 'Round Here
2021	"Where Corn Don't Grow"	—	—	—		—N/a
2022	"Miles on Main"/"Wild Woman"	—	—	—		—N/a
2022	"I Hope She's Drinkin' Tonight"/"Get Back Home"	—	—	—		—N/a
2023	"Raised Up Right"	—	—	—		—N/a
2023	"Mississippi or Me"	—	—	—		Ain't My Last Rodeo
2023	"Damn Country Music"	—	—	—		Ain't My Last Rodeo
2023	"They Don't Make 'Em Like That No More"	—	—	—		Ain't My Last Rodeo
2024	"Way Out Here"	—	—	—		Way Out Here
2024	"Rather Be"	—	—	—		Don't Mind If I Do
2024	"Christmas to Me"	—	—	—		—N/a
2025	"Slow Dancing in a Burning Room"	—	—	—		—N/a
2026	"My Way"	60	17	14		That's Just Me
2026	"Go Again" (featuring Hannah McFarland)	— (Note: "Go Again" did not enter the Billboard Hot 100, but peaked at number 2 on the Bubbling Under Hot 100 chart.)	32	—		That's Just Me
2026	"Imagine That"	—	48	—		That's Just Me
2026	"That's Just Me"	65	19	29		That's Just Me

=== Featured singles ===
List of singles as featured artist, with selected peak chart positions and certifications shown
Year	Title	Peak chart positions										Certifications	Album
Year	Title	US	US Country Songs	US Country Airplay	AUS	CAN	CAN Country	IRE	NZ	UK	WW	Certifications	Album
2022	"Half of Me" (Thomas Rhett featuring Riley Green)	52	9	1	—	54	1	—	—	—	—	RIAA: Platinum	Where We Started
2024	"You Look Like You Love Me" (Ella Langley featuring Riley Green)	30	7	1	67	31	11	66	19	59	89	RIAA: 4× Platinum; ARIA: 2× Platinum; BPI: Gold; MC: 3× Platinum; RMNZ: 2× Platinum	Hungover

== Other charted or certified songs ==
List of other charted or certified songs, with selected certifications
Year	Title	Peak chart positions			Certifications	Album
Year	Title	US Bubbling	US Country Songs	NZ Hot	Certifications	Album
2018	"Bury Me in Dixie"	—	—	—	RIAA: Gold	Outlaws Like Us
2018	"When She Comes Home Tonight"	—	—	—	RIAA: Platinum	Riley Green
2019	"Get That Man a Beer"	—	—	—	RIAA: Gold	Different 'Round Here
2025	"Make It Rain"	—	—	39		Don't Mind If I Do (deluxe)
2026	"Ten Pairs of Boots"	24	40	—		That's Just Me

== Music videos ==
Year	Video	Director
2018	"There Was This Girl"	Peter Zavadil
2019	"In Love by Now"	Mason Dixon
2019	"Numbers on the Cars"	Dann Huff
2020	"If It Wasn't for Trucks"	Jim Wright
2023	"Different 'Round Here" (with Luke Combs)	Justin Clough
2025	"Jesus Saves"	Shane Drake
2025	"Worst Way"	Shane Drake
