= 2024 in country music =

This is a list of notable events in country music that took place in 2024.

== Events ==
- January 2 – John Michael Montgomery announces his retirement from touring, with his final tour dates scheduled for the end of 2025.
- January 3 – Joe Bonsall of the Oak Ridge Boys announces his retirement from touring; Ben James finished the Oaks farewell tour in his place.
- January 4 – Dolly Parton celebrates her 55th Anniversary as a member of the Grand Ole Opry.
- January 19 – Elle King made headlines after taking to the Grand Ole Opry stage while heavily intoxicated during a Dolly Parton tribute show, in honor of Parton's 78th birthday. She later cancelled several of her own concerts in the wake of the incident. Parton subsequently came to King's defense during an interview with Extra, and King resumed performing in March.
- February 24 – Miranda Lambert quest Jack Ingram and Jon Randall at the 2024 Texas Songwriters Hall of Fame Show.
- March 10 – The UK Country Airplay chart, the first ever genre-specific radio chart in the United Kingdom, debuts its inaugural list, with "Creek Will Rise" by Conner Smith claiming the title of first number one single.
- April 8 – Morgan Wallen is arrested for reckless endangerment and disorderly conduct after throwing a chair off the sixth floor of Eric Church's rooftop bar in downtown Nashville. He was charged with three felonies and a misdemeanor and is due to appear in court on May 3 in between performances at Nissan Stadium.
- April 20 – Scotty McCreery is inducted as a member of the Grand Ole Opry by his childhood hero Josh Turner. McCreery was invited in December 2023, by Garth Brooks.
- April 24 – Miranda Lambert signs a joint record deal with Republic Records and Big Loud.
- April 26–28 – The 2024 edition of Stagecoach Festival took place at Empire Polo Club in Indio, California, featuring headline performances from Eric Church, Miranda Lambert and Morgan Wallen.
- May 3 – T. Graham Brown is inducted as a member of the Grand Ole Opry. He was invited by Vince Gill earlier in the year during his guest appearance on Brown's Sirius XM radio show.
  - Randy Travis releases "Where That Came From", his first new recording in over a decade with the help of AI software to recreate his vocals following a series of strokes and health issues that left him unable to sing. It would go on to chart on both the Billboard Hot Country Songs and Country Airplay charts, becoming Travis' first solo charting single in nearly two decades since "Angels" in 2005.
- May 21 – Lainey Wilson is surprised by Reba McEntire on the season finale of NBC's The Voice with an invitation to join the Grand Ole Opry. She was subsequently inducted by Trisha Yearwood and Garth Brooks on June 7.
- June 4 – Lukas Nelson announces that his band, Promise of the Real, would be going on hiatus so that the members can pursue their own projects.
- June 15 – George Strait's concert at Kyle Field in Texas becomes the most-attended ticketed show in US history, with 110,905 fans in attendance. The record was previously held by the Grateful Dead, who played for 107,019 people at Raceway Park in 1977.
- June 27 – Raul Malo, lead singer of the Mavericks, announces that he has been diagnosed with colon cancer and that the band will have to reschedule or cancel several shows in 2024 while he undergoes treatment.
- June 30 – Shania Twain performed in the traditional Legend's slot at the 2024 Glastonbury Festival, the first country artist to perform in the slot since Dolly Parton in 2014.
- July 5 – The War and Treaty go public about a racist incident where a cotton plant was placed in their dressing room at the Coca-Cola Sips and Sounds Music Festival in Austin, Texas. The band stated that this was only in their dressing room and left them angry and upset based on the history of the plant in regards to black American history. They left the festival immediately after their set and spoke to their young son, who encouraged them to speak up.
- August 23 – Ten years after coming out as gay, Billy Gilman marries his husband Anthony Carbone.
- August 27 – Drew Baldridge makes history by becoming the first artist to self-fund a number one song when his single "She's Somebody's Daughter" reached the top of the Country Aircheck chart.
- October 3 – Garth Brooks is sued by his former hairstylist and makeup artist who claimed she was sexually harassed by him. She also claimed that Brooks raped her during a trip the two took to film a Grammy tribute in 2019. Brooks has denied the accusations.
- November 25 – Westwood One, distributor of radio's American Country Countdown, announces that Kix Brooks (of Brooks & Dunn) would be stepping down as host upon the final countdown program of 2024, after 19 years of hosting. Ryan Fox, a morning personality at Cumulus Media-owned KPLX in Dallas, Texas, was announced as Brooks' successor, effective with the January 4, 2025 program.

== Top hits of the year ==
The following songs placed within the Top 20 on the Hot Country Songs, Country Airplay, or Canada Country charts in 2024:

=== Singles released by American and Australian artists ===
Songs	Airplay	Canada	Single	Artist	References
9	—	—	"16 Carriages"	Beyoncé	
8	1	1	"23"	Chayce Beckham	
5	—	—	"28"	Zach Bryan	
3	1	1	"Ain't No Love in Oklahoma"	Luke Combs	
26	3	20	"All I Need Is You"	Chris Janson	
8	—	—	"American Nights"	Zach Bryan	
7	—	—	"Ameriican Requiem"	Beyoncé	
3	8	11	"Austin"	Dasha	
9	1	2	"Back Then Right Now"	Tyler Hubbard	
1	1	1	"A Bar Song (Tipsy)"	Shaboozey	
10	2	3	"Beautiful as You"	Thomas Rhett	
6	—	—	"Blackbiird"	Beyoncé featuring Brittney Spencer, Reyna Roberts, Tanner Adell and Tiera Kennedy	
10	3	3	"Bulletproof"	Nate Smith	
7	1	4	"Burn It Down"	Parker McCollum	
20	2	14	"Cab in a Solo"	Scotty McCreery	
42	19	44	"Can't Break Up Now"	Old Dominion featuring Megan Moroney	
15	1	1	"Chevrolet"	Dustin Lynch featuring Jelly Roll	
18	1	1	"Cowboy Songs"	George Birge	
3	1	1	"Cowgirls"	Morgan Wallen featuring Ernest	
22	12	17	"Creek Will Rise"	Conner Smith	
9	—	—	"Daughter"	Beyoncé	
15	2	11	"Different 'Round Here"	Riley Green featuring Luke Combs	
14	5	7	"Dirt Cheap"	Cody Johnson	
31	11	29	"Fearless (The Echo)"	Jackson Dean	
20	1	16	"Gonna Love You"	Parmalee	
11	1	1	"Halfway to Hell"	Jelly Roll	
19	13	3	"Hang Tight Honey"	Lainey Wilson	
4	1	1	"High Road"	Koe Wetzel and Jessie Murph	
6	—	—	"High Road"	Zach Bryan	
3	1	1	"I Am Not Okay"	Jelly Roll	
13	1	2	"I Can Feel It"	Kane Brown	
1	1	1	"I Had Some Help"	Post Malone featuring Morgan Wallen	
1	26	14	"I Remember Everything"	Zach Bryan featuring Kacey Musgraves	
32	14	35	"I'm Not Pretty"	Megan Moroney	
2	—	—	"II Most Wanted"	Beyoncé featuring Miley Cyrus	
7	43	56	"In Your Love"	Tyler Childers	
3	56	—	"Jolene"	Beyoncé	
22	3	10	"Let Your Boys Be Country"	Jason Aldean	
5	—	—	"Levii's Jeans"	Beyoncé featuring Post Malone	
3	1	1	"Lies Lies Lies"	Morgan Wallen	
24	9	40	"Love You Again"	Chase Matthew	
11	2	4	"Love You, Miss You, Mean It"	Luke Bryan	
14	1	1	"Mamaw's House"	Thomas Rhett featuring Morgan Wallen	
3	1	1	"Man Made a Bar"	Morgan Wallen featuring Eric Church	
24	12	13	"Messed Up as Me"	Keith Urban	
4	1	1	"Miles on It"	Marshmello and Kane Brown	
16	2	46	"Mind on You"	George Birge	
26	5	11	"One Bad Habit"	Tim McGraw	
14	1	1	"Outskirts"	Sam Hunt	
38	18	9	"Out of That Truck"	Carrie Underwood	
7	1	1	"The Painter"	Cody Johnson	
3	—	—	"Pink Skies"	Zach Bryan	
3	1	1	"Pour Me a Drink"	Post Malone featuring Blake Shelton	
5	1	17	"Pretty Little Poison"	Warren Zeiders	
11	2	5	"Save Me the Trouble"	Dan + Shay	
29	3	22	"She's Somebody's Daughter"	Drew Baldridge	
29	15	7	"Sounds Like the Radio"	Zach Top	
5	56	—	"Spin You Around (1/24)"	Morgan Wallen	
10	—	—	"Sweet Dreams"	Koe Wetzel	
19	1	4	"Take Her Home"	Kenny Chesney	
1	33	25	"Texas Hold 'Em"	Beyoncé	
23	4	25	"This Is My Dirt"	Justin Moore	
6	1	2	"Truck Bed"	Hardy	
13	1	2	"Tucson Too Late"	Jordan Davis	
19	9	35	"We Don't Fight Anymore"	Carly Pearce featuring Chris Stapleton	
16	3	12	"We Ride"	Bryan Martin	
6	1	1	"Where It Ends"	Bailey Zimmerman	
4	3	1	"Where the Wild Things Are"	Luke Combs	
6	—	—	"Whiskey Whiskey"	Moneybagg Yo featuring Morgan Wallen	
5	2	1	"White Horse"	Chris Stapleton	
8	5	1	"Wildflowers and Wild Horses"	Lainey Wilson	
7	1	1	"You Look Like You Love Me"	Ella Langley featuring Riley Green	
26	5	38	"Young Love & Saturday Nights"	Chris Young	
21	2	3	"Your Place"	Ashley Cooke	

=== Singles released by Canadian artists ===
Songs	Airplay	Canada	Single	Artist	References
–	–	9	"Ahead of Our Time"	James Barker Band	
–	–	2	"Ain't Doin' Jack"	Josh Ross	
–	–	18	"Band on Her T-Shirt"	The Washboard Union	
–	–	11	"Bet You Break My Heart"	MacKenzie Porter	
–	–	8	"Bigger Than This Town"	Steven Lee Olsen	
–	–	20	"Blinding Lights (Country Version)"	Tebey	
–	–	10	"Broken Man"	Tyler Joe Miller	
–	–	7	"Do It Anyway"	Jade Eagleson with Jake Worthington	
–	–	4	"Fixer Upper"	Dallas Smith	
–	–	16	"Go Get Er"	Jess Moskaluke	
–	–	8	"Hey Mom I Made It"	Sacha	
–	–	5	"I Grew Up on a Farm"	The Reklaws	
–	–	4	"Let Your Horses Run"	Brett Kissel	
–	–	3	"Moonshines"	Owen Riegling	
–	–	7	"Not Yet"	High Valley	
–	–	2	"Old Dirt Roads"	Owen Riegling	
–	–	6	"One Beer Away"	The Reklaws	
–	–	19	"One More"	Tim Hicks	
–	–	12	"Out Here"	Steven Lee Olsen	
–	–	1	"Right Round Here"	Dean Brody	
–	–	2	"Telluride"	Jade Eagleson	
–	–	6	"Tim + Faith"	Madeline Merlo	
–	–	6	"Two of Us"	Brett Kissel with Cooper Alan	
–	–	2	"Use Me"	Dallas Smith	
–	–	8	"Whiskey in Colorado"	Tony Stevens	
–	–	19	"Your Mama Would Hate Me"	Dean Brody and James Barker Band	

== Top new album releases ==
US	Album	Artist	Record label	Release date	Reference
5	9 Lives	Koe Wetzel	Columbia	July 19	
10	About a Woman	Thomas Rhett	Valory	August 23	
3	Am I Okay?	Megan Moroney	Columbia	July 12	
1	Beautifully Broken	Jelly Roll	This Is Hit/Stoney Creek/Republic	October 11	
5	Born	Kenny Chesney	Blue Chair/Warner Music Nashville	March 22	
4	Cold Beer & Country Music	Zach Top	Leo33	April 5	
1	Cowboy Carter	Beyoncé	Columbia/Parkwood	March 29	
6	Cowboys and Dreamers	George Strait	MCA Nashville	September 6	
1	Deeper Well	Kacey Musgraves	Interscope/MCA Nashville	March 15	
6	Don't Mind If I Do	Riley Green	Nashville Harbor	October 18	
1	F-1 Trillion	Post Malone	Republic/Mercury	August 16	
2	Fathers & Sons	Luke Combs	Columbia/River House	June 14	
1	The Great American Bar Scene	Zach Bryan	Belting Bronco/Warner	July 4	
10	High	Keith Urban	Capitol Nashville	September 20	
8	Highway Prayers	Billy Strings	Reprise	September 27	
5	Hungover	Ella Langley	Sawgod/Columbia	August 2	
9	Made by These Moments	The Red Clay Strays	HBYCO/RCA	July 26	
9	Passage du Desir	Johnny Blue Skies	High Top Mountain	July 12	
1	Patterns	Kelsea Ballerini	Black River	October 25	
8	Postcards from Texas	Miranda Lambert	Republic/Big Loud	September 13	
10	Rebel	Anne Wilson	Capitol CMG/MCA Nashville/Sparrow	April 19	
8	Restless Mind	Sam Barber	Lockeland Springs/Atlantic	November 1	
3	Twisters: The Album	Various artists	Atlantic	July 19	
2	Where I've Been, Isn't Where I'm Going	Shaboozey	American Dogwood/Empire	May 31	
3	Whirlwind	Lainey Wilson	BBR	August 23	

=== Other top albums ===
US	Album	Artist	Record label	Release date	Reference
19	Actin' Up Again	Gavin Adcock	Thrivin Here/Warner Nashville	August 2	
33	Bad for Me	Chayce Beckham	Wheelhouse	April 5	
26	Be Right Here	Blackberry Smoke	3 Legged/Thirty Tigers	February 16	
50	The Border	Willie Nelson	Legacy	May 31	
12	California Gold	Nate Smith	RCA Nashville	October 4	
27	Change the Game	Cody Jinks	Late August	March 22	
39	Chapter & Verse	Gabby Barrett	Warner Nashville	February 2	
49	Greatest Hits	Little Big Town	Capitol Nashville	August 9	
44	Have a Nice Day	Treaty Oak Revival	TOR	April 12	
33	The Hill	Aaron Lewis	Valory	March 29	
41	Hixtape: Vol. 3: Difftape	Various artists	Big Loud	March 29	
31	Hummingbird	Carly Pearce	Big Machine	June 7	
43	Keepin' the Lights On	Kameron Marlowe	Columbia Nashville	May 31	
11	Live Vol. 1	Billy Strings	Reprise	July 12	
11	Mind of a Country Boy	Luke Bryan	Capitol Nashville/Row Crop	September 27	
31	Mind of a Country Boy (EP)	Luke Bryan	Capitol Nashville/Row Crop	June 14	
34	Nashville, Tennessee	Ernest	Big Loud	April 12	
48	Noise Complaint	Koe Wetzel	BMI/Columbia/Legacy	June 7	
19	Odies but Goodies	Old Dominion	RCA Nashville	September 6	
18	Petty Country: A Country Music Celebration of Tom Petty	Various artists	Tom Petty Legacy/Big Machine	June 21	
25	Rise & Fall	Scotty McCreery	Triple Tigers	May 10	
42	Smoky Mountains	Conner Smith	Valory Music Group	January 26	
23	Songwriter	Johnny Cash	Mercury Nashville/UMe	June 28	
33	Stampede	Orville Peck	Warner	August 2	
35	Strong	Tyler Hubbard	Hubbard House/EMI Nashville	April 12	
42	Tattoos	Brantley Gilbert	Valory	September 13	
47	Three Twenty Four: The EP	Ole60	Grey Area/Red Door	March 22	
34	Through the Smoke	Nate Smith	RCA Nashville	April 5	
24	Trail of Flowers	Sierra Ferrell	Rounder/Concord	March 22	
29	Way Out Here	Riley Green	Nashville Harbor/BMLG	April 12	
35	What Happens Now?	Dasha	Version III/Warner	February 16	
34	Young Love & Saturday Nights	Chris Young	RCA Nashville	March 22	

== Hall of Fame inductees ==
=== Country Music Hall of Fame ===
(announced on March 18, 2024)

- John Anderson
- James Burton
- Toby Keith

=== Canadian Country Music Hall of Fame ===
(announced on June 26, 2024)

- k.d. lang
- Gilles Godard

=== International Bluegrass Music Hall of Fame ===
(announced on July 17, 2024)

- Katy Daley
- Jerry Douglas
- Alan Munde

== Deaths ==
- January 10 – Audie Blaylock, 61, American bluegrass singer and guitarist.
- January 5 – Larry Collins, 79, American rockabilly guitarist, songwriter ("Delta Dawn") and member of the Collins Kids, natural causes.
- January 13 – Jo-El Sonnier, 77, American singer-songwriter and accordionist ("Tear Stained Letter", "No More One More Time"), heart attack.
- January 23 – Margo Smith, 84, American country singer ("Don't Break the Heart That Loves You", "It Only Hurts for a Little While"), complications from stroke.
- February 5 – Toby Keith, 62, American country singer-songwriter; stomach cancer.
- February 22 – Roni Stoneman, 85, bluegrass musician, member of the Stoneman Family, and Hee Haw cast member.
- April 2 – Jerry Abbott, 81, American country songwriter and musician.
- April 30 – Duane Eddy, 86, American cross genre guitarist and innovator (“Rebel-'Rouser”, “Forty Miles of Bad Road”), cancer.
- May 6 – Wayland Holyfield, 82, American songwriter ("Arkansas (You Run Deep in Me)", "Rednecks, White Socks and Blue Ribbon Beer", "You're My Best Friend").
- June 8 – Mark James, 83, American songwriter ("Suspicious Minds", "Always on My Mind").
- June 27 – Kinky Friedman, 79, American singer-songwriter and humorist, Parkinson's disease.
- July 1 – Rusty Golden, 65, American singer, son of the Oak Ridge Boys' William Lee Golden and member of the Goldens.
- July 9 – Joe Bonsall, 76, longtime member of the Oak Ridge Boys (tenor vocal), complications from ALS.
- July 10 – Dave Loggins, 76, pop and country singer ("Please Come to Boston", "Nobody Loves Me Like You Do").
- July 20 – Sandy Posey, 80, American pop, country and gospel singer, complications from dementia.
- August 16 – Bobby Hicks, 91, American Hall of Fame bluegrass fiddler, complications from a heart attack.
- August 27 – Pete Wade, 89, guitarist, session musician who was part of the Nashville A-Team; complications of hip surgery
- September 13 – Tommy Cash, 84, American country musician ("Six White Horses").
- September 22 – Hugh Prestwood, 82, American songwriter ("Hard Rock Bottom of Your Heart"), stroke.
- September 28 – Kris Kristofferson, 88, American country singer-songwriter and actor.
- November 14 – Tommy Alverson, 74, American country singer-songwriter, liver cancer.
- November 22 – Toni Price, 63, American country blues singer, brain aneurysm.

== Major awards ==
=== Academy of Country Music Awards ===
(presented on May 8, 2025)

- Entertainer of the Year – Lainey Wilson
- Male Artist of the Year – Chris Stapleton
- Female Artist of the Year – Lainey Wilson
- Group of the Year – Old Dominion
- Duo of the Year – Brooks & Dunn
- New Male Artist of the Year – Zach Top
- New Female Artist of the Year – Ella Langley
- New Duo/Group of the Year - The Red Clay Strays
- Songwriter of the Year – Jessie Jo Dillon
- Artist-Songwriter of the Year – Lainey Wilson
- Single of the Year – "You Look Like You Love Me" (Ella Langley featuring Riley Green)
- Song of the Year – "Dirt Cheap" (Josh Phillips)
- Album of the Year – Whirlwind (Lainey Wilson)
- Musical Event of the Year – "You Look Like You Love Me" (Ella Langley featuring Riley Green)
- Visual Media of the Year – "You Look Like You Love Me" (Ella Langley featuring Riley Green)
- Triple Crown Award – Keith Urban
- Alan Jackson Lifetime Achievement Award – Alan Jackson
