= 59th Annual Country Music Association Awards =

2025 awards ceremony

- Date: November 19, 2025
- Location: Bridgestone Arena, Nashville, Tennessee
- Hosted by: Lainey Wilson

Highlights
- Most wins: Riley Green; Ella Langley; Lainey Wilson (3 each)
- Most nominations: Ella Langley; Megan Moroney; Lainey Wilson (6 each)

Television/radio coverage
- Network: ABC, Hulu
- Viewership: 6.03 million

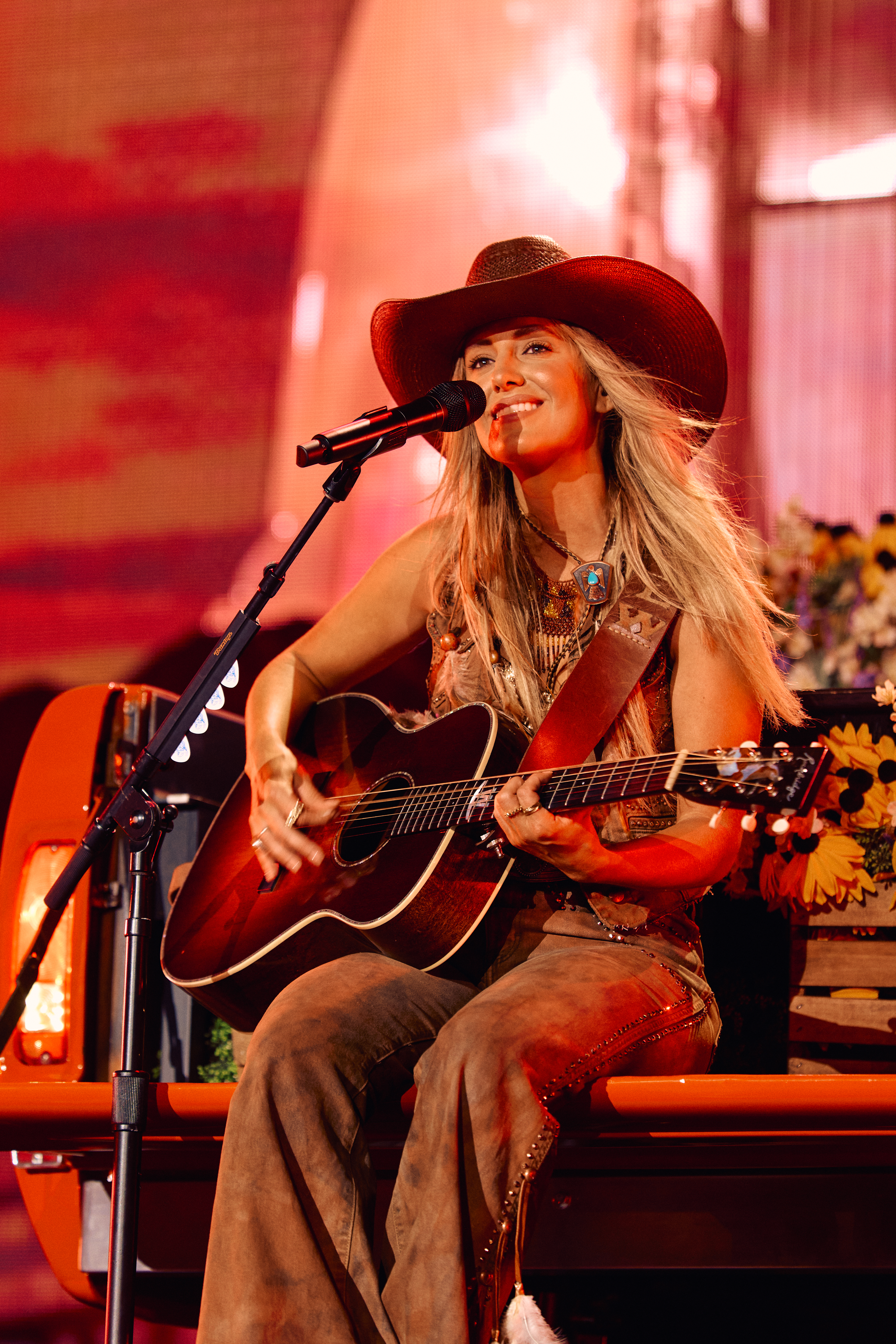
Lainey Wilson, Entertainer of the Year recipient.

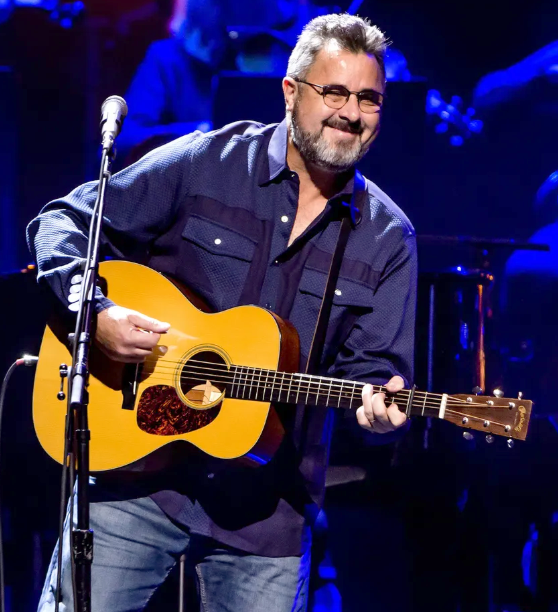
Vince Gill, Willie Nelson Lifetime Achievement Award recipient.

The 59th Annual Country Music Association Awards were on Wednesday, November 19, 2025, at Bridgestone Arena in Nashville. The ceremony was broadcast live on ABC and was made available to stream the next day on Hulu. CMA award winner and six-time nominee this year, Lainey Wilson, hosted the ceremony.

== Background ==
On September 30, CMA announced that Wilson will return as host for the ceremony, but for the first time as a solo host. It is only the third time that the CMA Awards have had a solo female host, following Dolly Parton in 1988, and Reba McEntire in 1991.

On November 10, the association announced that eighteen-time CMA award winner and country legend, Vince Gill, would receive the Willie Nelson Lifetime Achievement Award. A statement by the CMA chief executive officer Sarah Trahern read “Vince embodies the very best of what country music stands for,” Sarah Trahern, CMA chief executive officer, said in a statement. “He's a true trailblazer, one who gives back to the community, honors the roots of our genre, and even now continues to share his talent with fans across the globe. As a Country Music Hall of Fame member, 18-time CMA Award winner, and former 12-time CMA Awards host, he remains a vibrant force in our industry, and we’re honored to celebrate an artist whose influence is so deeply woven into the fabric of our format.”

== Winners and nominees ==
Nominations were announced on Monday, September 8, 2025, at 12:00 PM/CT via livestream on CMA's official Facebook and YouTube channel. The eligibility period for the nominees was July 1, 2024 to June 30, 2025. The winners and nominees are voted on by "over 7,100 professional voting members" of the Country Music Association.

Entertainer of the Year	Album of the Year
Lainey Wilson; Luke Combs; Cody Johnson; Chris Stapleton; Morgan Wallen	Whirlwind — Lainey Wilson; Am I Okay? — Megan Moroney; Cold Beer & Country Music — Zach Top; F-1 Trillion — Post Malone; I'm the Problem — Morgan Wallen
Male Vocalist of the Year	Female Vocalist of the Year
Cody Johnson; Luke Combs; Chris Stapleton; Zach Top; Morgan Wallen	Lainey Wilson; Kelsea Ballerini; Miranda Lambert; Ella Langley; Megan Moroney
Vocal Group of the Year	Vocal Duo of the Year
The Red Clay Strays; Lady A; Little Big Town; Old Dominion; Rascal Flatts	Brooks & Dunn; Brothers Osborne; Dan + Shay; Maddie & Tae; The War and Treaty
Single of the Year	Song of the Year
"You Look Like You Love Me" — Ella Langley (ft. Riley Green); "4x4xU" — Lainey Wilson; "Ain't No Love In Oklahoma" — Luke Combs; "Am I Okay?" — Megan Moroney; "I Never Lie" — Zach Top	"You Look Like You Love Me" — Ella Langley, Riley Green, Aaron Raitiere; "4x4xU" — Jon Decious, Aaron Raitiere, Lainey Wilson; "Am I Okay?" — Megan Moroney, Jessie Jo Dillon, Luke Laird; "I Never Lie" — Carson Chamberlain, Tim Nichols, Zach Top; "Texas" — Johnny Clawson, Josh Dorr, Kyle Sturrock, Lalo Guzman
New Artist of the Year	Musician of the Year
Zach Top; Ella Langley; Shaboozey; Tucker Wetmore; Stephen Wilson Jr.	Paul Franklin, Steel Guitar; Jenee Fleenor, Fiddle; Brent Mason, Guitar; Rob McNelley, Guitar; Derek Wells, Guitar
Music Video of the Year	Musical Event of the Year
"You Look Like You Love Me" — Ella Langley (ft. Riley Green); "Am I Okay?" — Megan Moroney; "I'm Gonna Love You" — Cody Johnson and Carrie Underwood; "Somewhere Over Laredo" — Lainey Wilson; "Think I'm in Love with You" — Chris Stapleton	"Pour Me A Drink" — Post Malone (ft. Blake Shelton); "Don't Mind If I Do" — Riley Green (ft. Ella Langley); "Hard Fought Hallelujah" — Brandon Lake (with Jelly Roll); "I'm Gonna Love You" — Cody Johnson and Carrie Underwood; "You Had To Be There" — Megan Moroney (ft. Kenny Chesney)
Willie Nelson Lifetime Achievement Award
Vince Gill

=== International Awards ===
The international winners were announced on November 14, 2025.

International Artist Achievement Award	Global Country Artist Award	Live Music Advancement Award
Morgan Wallen	Cameron Whitcomb	Shannon Saunders

== Performances ==
Performer(s)	Song(s)
Luke Combs	"Back In The Saddle"
Lainey Wilson	Hosting Monologue Medley "White Horse" (with Charlie Worsham) "Hillbilly Deluxe" "You Look Like You Love Me" "Redneck Woman" "Need You Now" "Gunpowder and Lead" "A Bar Song (Tipsy)" "Girl Crush" (with Little Big Town) "Where The Blacktop Ends" (with Keith Urban)
Zach Top	"Guitar"
Megan Moroney	"6 Months Later"
Chris Stapleton	"Bad as I Used to Be"
Kelsea Ballerini	"I Sit in Parks"
The Red Clay Strays	"People Hatin'"
Stephen Wilson Jr.	"Stand By Me"
Kenny Chesney	"American Kids" "When the Sun Goes Down"
Old Dominion	"Break Up with Him" "Memory Lane" "One Man Band" "Hotel Key" "Snapback"
Shaboozey; Stephen Wilson Jr.	"Took A Walk"
Lainey Wilson	"Ring Finger"
Miranda Lambert; Chris Stapleton	"A Song to Sing"
Riley Green	"Worst Way"
Ella Langley	"Choosin' Texas"
Tucker Wetmore	"Wind Up Missin' You"
Brandi Carlile; Patty Loveless	Willie Nelson Lifetime Achievement Award honoring Vince Gill "When I Call Your Name"
BigXthaPlug; Luke Combs	"Pray Hard"

== Presenters ==
Presenter(s)	Notes
Billy Ray Cyrus and Elizabeth Hurley	Presented Single of the Year
Leanne Morgan	Introduced Zach Top
Gretchen Wilson and Ne-Yo	Presented Vocal Duo of the Year
LeAnn Rimes, Chris O’Donnell, and Jessica Capshaw	Presented New Artist of the Year
Billy Bob Thornton	Introduced The Red Clay Strays
Kimberly Perry and Grace Van Patten	Presented Song of The Year
Bailey Zimmerman	Introduced Old Dominion
Steve Martin and Alison Brown	Presented Album of the Year
Bert Kreischer	Introduced Shaboozey and Stephen Wilson Jr.
Jordan Davis and Lauren Daigle	Presented Vocal Group of the Year
Cody Johnson	Introduced Lainey Wilson
Ella Langley	Honor Fort Campbell 101st Airborne Division
Alan Ritchson	Introduced Riley Green
Brandon Lake and Lara Spencer	Presented Male Vocalist of the Year
George Strait	Presented Willie Nelson Lifetime Achievement Award to Vince Gill
Lady A	Presented Female Vocalist of the Year
Keith Urban	Presented Entertainer of the Year

== Reception ==
Overnight viewership was 6.037 million viewers, down 1% from the previous year, but ranked number one for the top prime-time telecasts. The reception of the ceremony was generally favorable. Lainey Wilson was praised for her solo hosting debut, along with her opening medley of country hits. Many outlets also highlighted her pointed remarks, after winning Female Vocalist of the Year, on the online discourse surrounding women in country music, saying, "...And for the folks that are sitting at home in your mama’s basement eating your Cheetos, trying to pit women against each other: Y’all need to find something better to do".

Several performances drew acclaim, including Ella Langley’s “Choosin’ Texas”, Shaboozey and Stephen Wilson, Jr.’s collaboration “Took a Walk”, as well as Brandi Carlile’s tribute to Vince Gill alongside Patty Loveless. Some publications also noted the surprise victories by The Red Clay Strays and Cody Johnson. The Seattle Times pointed out Zach Top’s standout win for New Artist of the Year as a neotraditional country performer, noting the humorous moment in which he accepted the award while holding a can of Coors Banquet.

== Milestones and achievements ==
- This is only the third ceremony to have multiple women leading the nominations. Occurring previously in 2013 (Kacey Musgraves and Taylor Swift) and 1986 (The Judds and Reba McEntire).
- Brooks & Dunn became the most awarded act in CMA history with 20 wins overall, including their sixteenth win for Vocal Duo of the Year in this ceremony.
- Ella Langley and Riley Green's "You Look Like You Love Me", is the only song in CMA history to win every award an individual song is eligible for, with: Musical Event of the Year in 2024; Song of the Year, Single of the Year, and Music Video of the Year in 2025. ("Whiskey Lullaby" being the closest to the milestone, until this achievement, with three of the four nominations won).
- Miranda Lambert and Reba McEntire are tied with the most Female Vocalist of the Year nominations all-time with 18.
- Lainey Wilson became the third woman to win Female Vocalist of the Year four years in a row (previously accomplished by Miranda Lambert and Reba McEntire).
- Lainey Wilson became the fourth host to win Entertainer for the Year the same year when they hosted the ceremony, (Barbara Mandrell in 1980 and 1981; Vince Gill in 1993 and 1994; Brad Paisley in 2010).
