= Don't Mind If I Do =

Don't Mind If I Do may refer to:

- "I don't mind if I do", a catchphrase of Colonel Humphrey Chinstrap on the 1940s British radio comedy show It's That Man Again
- I Don't Mind If I Do, 1950 book by Elspeth Huxley

== Music ==
=== Albums ===
- Don't Mind If I Do (Culture Club album), 1999
- Don't Mind If I Do (Riley Green album), 2024
- Don't Mind If I Do, a 1992 album by Jerry Jerry and the Sons of Rhythm Orchestra

=== Songs ===
- "Don't Mind If I Do" (song), by Riley Green and Ella Langley
- "Don't Mind If I Do", song by Chris Wallace on the 2012 album Push Rewind
- "Don't Mind If I Do", 2021 song by David James
- "Don't Mind If I Do", 2003 song by Dead Low Tide
- "Don't Mind If I Do", song by George Strait on the 1988 album If You Ain't Lovin' You Ain't Livin'
- "I Don't Mind If I Do", song by The Irish Rovers on the 1966 album The First of the Irish Rovers
- "Don't Mind If I Do", song by Mac Miller on the 2010 mixtape K.I.D.S
- "Don't Mind If I Do", song by Status Quo on the 1988 album Ain't Complaining

== See also ==
- "Thrash?! Don't Mind If I Do", song on the 2003 album Waste 'Em All by Municipal Waste
