= Midtown Sessions =

EP by Riley Green
- Released: July 11, 2025
- Genre: Country
- Length: 17:00
- Label: Nashville Harbor
- Producer: Erik Dylan; Riley Green; Dann Huff

Riley Green chronology
Don't Mind If I Do (2024)	Midtown Sessions (2025)	That's Just Me (2026)

Midtown Sessions is the seventh extended play by American country music artist Riley Green. It was released on July 11, 2025, via Nashville Harbor Records & Entertainment. Green co-produced the album with Erik Dylan and Dann Huff.

== Background ==
Green announced Midtown Sessions on July 10, 2025, the day before its release, following his critically acclaimed 2024 album, Don't Mind if I Do.

Midtown Sessions features five stripped-down songs, including Green's hits, "Change My Mind" and "Worst Way", alongside a cover of Tim McGraw's "The Cowboy in Me" and one new song, "Bartender in Destin".

== Critical reception ==
Professional ratings
Review scores
Source	Rating
AllMusic	3/5 stars

In a three-out-of-five-star review by the Tivo Staff, AllMusic called the five-song collection an "intimate, stripped-down set of fan favorites...that showcase his rugged voice and rich, everyman songwriting". Holler Country described the songs as beach and smooth.

== Track listing ==
Midtown Sessions track listing
No.	Title	Writer(s)	Length
1.	"Change My Mind"	Riley Green; Erik Dylan; Randy Montana	3:15
2.	"Worst Way"	Green	3:33
3.	"Jesus Saves"	Green	3:44
4.	"Cowboy in Me"	Al Anderson; Jeffrey Steele; Craig Wiseman	3:14
5.	"Bartender in Destin"	Sam Banks; Nick Walsh	3:14
Total length:			17:00

== Personnel ==
Credits adapted from Tidal.

=== Musicians ===
- Riley Green – lead vocals, acoustic guitar
- Erik Dylan – background vocals
- Wyatt McCubbin – acoustic guitar
- Jacob Garner – acoustic guitar, dobro, guitar
- Jake Sommers – acoustic guitar, dobro
- David Silviera – background vocals, bass
- Peter Ferguson – bass, piano
- Quinn Stanphill – drums, percussion
- Tim Rencken – fiddle, dobro
- Austin Haigler – cello

=== Technical ===
- Riley Green – production
- Dann Huff – production
- Erik Dylan – production
- Jason Hall – mastering, mixing, recording, immersive mastering, immersive mixing
- Will Borza – mastering, immersive mixing
- Luke DeJaynes – mixing
- Skyler Chuckry – recording, assistant mixing
- Billy Gastfield – recording
- Chris Small – editing
- Carly Smith – assistant recording

== Charts ==
Weekly chart performance for Midtown Sessions
Chart (2025)	Peak position
US Billboard 200	113
US Top Country Albums (Billboard)	24
