= Damn Good Day to Leave =

Single by Riley Green

from the album Ain't My Last Rodeo
- Released: March 18, 2024
- Genre: Country
- Length: 3:31
- Label: BMLG
- Songwriters: Riley Green; Erik Dylan; Jonathan Singleton; Nick Walsh
- Producers: Scott Borchetta; Jimmy Harnen; Dann Huff

Riley Green singles chronology
"Different 'Round Here" (2023)	"Damn Good Day to Leave" (2024)	"You Look Like You Love Me" (2024)

Lyric video
- "Damn Good Day to Leave" on YouTube

"Damn Good Day to Leave" is a song by American country music singer Riley Green. It was released as the second single from Green's second studio album, Ain't My Last Rodeo on March 18, 2024. It was written by Green with Erik Dylan, Jonathan Singleton, and Nick Walsh, with production handled by Scott Borchetta, Jimmy Harnen, and Dann Huff.

== Content ==
Green co-wrote "Damn Good Day to Leave" with Erik Dylan, Jonathan Singleton, and Nick Walsh in March 2022 at 50 Egg Music. Inspired in part by Green's days playing football for Jacksonville State University in Alabama, he brought the idea for the song title to the writing session, and they wrote something that detailed the end of a relationship, permeated by dark imagery of vehicle taillights and Hank Williams singing about trains, but contrasted by the protagonist instead seeing blue skies and newfound freedom in the wake of her leaving. Though not done intentionally, the writers noted thematic similarities to "I'm Gonna Miss Her (The Fishin' Song)" by Brad Paisley, "I Was on a Boat That Day" by Old Dominion, and "When It Rains It Pours" by Luke Combs after completing the song.

It was issued to country radio with an impact date of March 18, 2024, and was the most-added song that week at the format with 84 first-week adds. Originally promoted as the second single from Ain't My Last Rodeo, the song was also later included on Green's 2024 EP, Way Out Here and his third studio album, Don't Mind If I Do, which was released in October 2024.

== Live performances ==
Green performed "Damn Good Day to Leave" on Fox & Friends on June 14, 2024.

== Chart performance ==
=== Weekly charts ===
Weekly chart performance for "Damn Good Day to Leave"
Chart (2024–2025)	Peak position
Canada Country (Billboard)	6
US Bubbling Under Hot 100 (Billboard)	17
US Country Airplay (Billboard)	10
US Hot Country Songs (Billboard)	28

=== Year-end charts ===
Year-end chart performance for "Damn Good Day to Leave"
Chart (2025)	Position
US Country Airplay (Billboard)	59

== Certifications ==
Certifications for Damn Good Day To Leave
Region	Certification	Certified units/sales
Canada (Music Canada)	Gold	40,000^{‡}
^{‡} Sales+streaming figures based on certification alone.
