= Honest Woman =

2026 studio album by Carly Pearce

Studio album by Carly Pearce
- Released: August 28, 2026
- Genres: Country; bluegrass
- Length: 52:57
- Labels: BBR; BMG
- Producers: Carly Pearce; Ben West

Carly Pearce chronology
Hummingbird (2024)	Honest Woman (2026)

Singles from Honest Woman
- 1. "Dream Come True" Released: November 14, 2025; 2. "If I Don't Leave I'm Gonna Stay" Released: March 13, 2026

Honest Woman is the fifth studio album by American country music artist Carly Pearce. It was released on August 28, 2026, via BBR Music Group and BMG Rights Management, her first project with the labels. It was preceded by the singles "Dream Come True" and "If I Don't Leave I'm Gonna Stay". The album was produced by Ben West, contains sixteen tracks, and collaborations with Riley Green, Dan Tyminski, and Molly Tuttle.

== Background ==
Pearce released her fourth album Hummingbird on June 7, 2024 via Big Machine Records. She embarked on the Hummingbird World Tour from October 2024 to May 2025, and released a deluxe edition of the album subtitled No Rain, No Flowers on March 14, 2025.

"Dream Come True", the first single from Honest Woman, was released on November 14, 2025. It was followed by second single "If I Don't Leave I'm Gonna Stay" featuring Riley Green on March 13, 2026. In June 2026, Pearce revealed that she had parted ways with Big Machine and signed a joint record deal with BBR Music Group and BMG Rights Management.

The album was officially announced on June 23, 2026. Of the project, Pearce stated, "when I started making Honest Woman, I found myself rediscovering who I am and why I wanted to be a country music singer in the first place. This album takes me back to the beginning of my story, where the sounds of classic country and bluegrass music shaped who I am. I’m so proud of this body of work, and I truly feel like it’s my best yet."

"Church Girl", "You Can Have Him", "She Don't", "What If You Loved Me", and "Happy For Myself" were all released as promotional singles ahead of the album.

== Track listing ==
Honest Woman track listing
No.	Title	Writer(s)	Length
1.	"Dream Come True"	Tofer Brown; Lauren Hungate; Carly Pearce; Emily Weisband	2:58
2.	"Church Girl"	Cameron Bedell; Seth Ennis; Carter Faith	3:19
3.	"She Don't"	Matt Rossi; Bryan Simpson	3:31
4.	"You Can Have Him"	Brown; Faith; Hungate; Pearce	3:16
5.	"How Long"	Al Anderson; Jeffrey Steele	3:05
6.	"WWJD"	Devin Dawson; Ennis; Jordan Minton; Jordan Reynolds	3:04
7.	"Same Circus"	Hungate; Pearce; Reynolds; Weisband	3:22
8.	"Happy for Myself"	Hungate; Pearce; Reynolds; Weisband	2:45
9.	"If I Don't Leave I'm Gonna Stay" (featuring Riley Green)	Dawson; Ennis; Minton; Reynolds	3:33
10.	"I Don't Have the Heart"	Hungate; Pearce; Reynolds; Weisband	3:28
11.	"He Don't Like My Dogs"	Hungate; Pearce; Reynolds; Weisband	2:41
12.	"Leave My Heart Alone"	Matt Dregstem; Josh Miller; Thomas Rhett; Josh Thompson	2:33
13.	"Who's Lying Here" (featuring Dan Tyminski)	Brown; Hungate; Pearce; Tyminski	3:50
14.	"Daisy"	Ashley Gorley; Michael Hardy; Ben Johnson; Hunter Phelps	4:33
15.	"What If You Loved Me" (featuring Molly Tuttle and Dan Tyminski)	Hungate; Reynolds; Parker Welling	3:05
16.	"Why God Why Me"	Ashley Anne; Averie Bielski; Olivia DaPonte; Fran Litterski	3:54
Total length:			52:57

== Personnel ==
Credits are adapted from Tidal.

=== Musicians ===
- Carly Pearce – vocals (all tracks), background vocals (tracks 2, 3, 5, 7, 8, 10–12, 16)
- Josh Matheny – Dobro guitar (all tracks), lap steel guitar (3, 5–8, 10)
- Jenee Fleenor – fiddle
- Dave Cohen – keyboards (1), Hammond organ (2, 3, 7, 8, 10–12, 14, 16), Wurlitzer electric piano (2, 9), Wurlitzer organ (3, 7, 11, 14), piano (4–6, 10, 14), synthesizer (6, 10)
- Bryan Sutton – acoustic guitar (1–3, 9, 11, 12, 16), mandolin (2, 12, 16), banjo (12)
- Nathan Dugger – electric guitar (1, 2, 4, 9, 12), steel guitar (1), pedal steel guitar (4, 9, 11, 13), mandolin (9), guitar (11)
- Aaron Sterling – drums (1, 2, 4, 9), percussion (2, 9, 11, 12, 16)
- Byron House – bass guitar (1), upright bass (2, 4, 13, 16)
- Ben West – background vocals (3, 5, 6, 10, 12); bass, Hammond organ, string arrangement (9); piano (13)
- Craig Young – bass (3, 5–8, 10, 14)
- Rob McNelley – electric guitar (3, 5–8, 10, 14)
- Seth Taylor – mandolin (3), acoustic guitar (5–8, 10, 14)
- Jerry Roe – percussion (3, 5–8, 10, 14)
- Morgane Stapleton – background vocals (4, 5)
- Dan Tyminski – background vocals (5, 13, 15); vocals, acoustic guitar, mandolin (13, 15)
- Jordan Reynolds – background vocals (7)
- Gideon Klein – string arrangement, cello (9)
- Josee Klein – viola, violin (9)
- Riley Green – vocals (9)
- Mark Hill – bass (11, 12)
- Molly Tuttle – vocals, acoustic guitar, background vocals (15)

=== Technical ===
- Ben West – production (all tracks), vocal engineering (1–3, 5, 6, 8, 10, 12, 14), engineering (9)
- Carly Pearce – production
- Dave Clauss – mixing, vocal engineering (all tracks); engineering (1–8, 10–16)
- Nathan Dugger – engineering (9, 13)
- Aaron Sterling – engineering (9)
- Bryan Sutton – engineering (9)
- Gideon Klein – engineering (9)
- Josh Matheny – engineering (9)
- Byron House – engineering (13)
- Dann Huff – vocal engineering (9)
- Alberto Sewald – engineering assistance (1, 2, 11, 12, 16)
- Ethan Shull – engineering assistance (3, 5–8, 10, 14)
- Adam Ayan – mastering
- Kelsey Granda – production coordination

== Charts ==
Chart performance for Honest Woman
Chart (2026)	Peak position
UK Albums Sales (Official Charts)	42
UK Country Albums (Official Charts)	3
UK Independent Albums (Official Charts)	13
