= If I Don't Leave I'm Gonna Stay =

2026 single by Carly Pearce and Riley Green

Single by Carly Pearce and Riley Green

from the album Honest Woman
- Released: March 13, 2026
- Recorded: January 2026
- Genre: Country
- Length: 3:32
- Label: Stoney Creek
- Songwriters: Devin Dawson; Seth Ennis; Jordan Minton; Jordan Reynolds
- Producers: Carly Pearce; Ben West

Carly Pearce singles chronology
"Dream Come True" (2025)	"If I Don't Leave I'm Gonna Stay" (2026)

Riley Green singles chronology
"Change My Mind" (2026)	"If I Don't Leave I'm Gonna Stay" (2026)	"Think as You Drunk" (2026)

Music video
- "If I Don't Leave I'm Gonna Stay" on YouTube

"If I Don't Leave I'm Gonna Stay" is a song by American country music singers Carly Pearce and Riley Green. It was released on March 13, 2026, as the second single from Pearce's fifth studio album, Honest Woman. It was written by Devin Dawson, Seth Ennis, Jordan Minton, and Jordan Reynolds, and produced by Pearce and Ben West.

== Background ==
Carly Pearce and Riley Green have been friends for years, and Pearce previously filled in for singer Ella Langley to perform "Don't Mind If I Do" with Green during the 20th anniversary party for Big Machine Records in 2025. After Pearce and Green agreed to collaborate on the song, as Jordan Reynolds had suggested to Pearce, Green sent Pearce a voice text of him singing the chorus. They recorded their vocals in January 2026.

== Composition ==
The song is a country ballad that is composed of slow strings, steel guitar and minimal percussion. The singers each perform a verse and sing the chorus together. The lyrics find two lovers who are conflicted about whether to give in to their mutual attraction during a late night encounter, despite being aware of the risks and consequences; in particular, Carly Pearce sings that she cannot drive if she drinks another glass of wine, and must go to church the next day.

== Music video ==
The music video was directed by Wes Edwards and released alongside the single. It was filmed in Nashville, Tennessee about three weeks before the song's release. In the clip, Carly Pearce and Riley Green portray the couple from the song. They are shown engaging in an intimate encounter, which involves caressing and kissing, interspersed with clips of each of them alone. Green makes coffee the following day, after having walked Pearce to the door on the previous night. The video ends on a cliffhanger, leaving it ambiguous whether Pearce left that night or in the morning.

== Charts ==
Chart performance for "If I Don't Leave I'm Gonna Stay"
Chart (2026)	Peak position
New Zealand Hot Singles (RMNZ)	21
US Bubbling Under Hot 100 (Billboard)	17
US Country Airplay (Billboard)	33
US Hot Country Songs (Billboard)	40
