= Weren't for the Wind =

Single by Ella Langley

from the album Still Hungover
- Released: October 4, 2024
- Genre: Country
- Length: 3:13
- Label: Sawgod; Columbia
- Songwriters: Ella Langley; Johnny Clawson; Joybeth Taylor
- Producer: Will Bundy

Ella Langley singles chronology
"You Look Like You Love Me" (2024)	"Weren't for the Wind" (2024)	"Don't Mind If I Do" (2025)

Music video
- "Weren't for the Wind" on YouTube

"Weren't for the Wind" is a song by American country music singer Ella Langley. It was released in October 2024, as the first single from the deluxe reissue of her debut studio album, Hungover, before being sent to country radio on January 2, 2025. Langley co-wrote the song with Johnny Clawson and Joybeth Taylor, and it was produced by Will Bundy.

== Background ==
Three months after the release of Langley's debut album, Hungover, a deluxe reissue of the album, titled Still Hungover, was released on November 1, 2024. "Weren't for the Wind" was initially released as a promotional single ahead of its release on October 4, 2024, before being issued as her second single to country radio in January 2025.

== Content ==
Langley co-wrote "Weren't for the Wind" with Johnny Clawson and Joybeth Taylor. Described as a mid-tempo track, the song finds Langley providing a warning to future boyfriends about her rolling stone tendencies, comparing her free-spirited nature to that of the changing winds.

Langley was inspired to write the song when driving through the state of Wyoming and admiring its natural beauty: "I don't know if you've ever been through Wyoming, but it's just, it's all this beautiful land. It's just flat. There's horses everywhere. I just vividly, like every time I drive through Wyoming, there's always one moment where there's this horse running alongside of whatever I'm in. I'm like, love that. So I feel like it's just these westerny type vibes. And I don't know, that one just kind of fell out. I can't even remember who brought in that title. I don't even think we had a title for it. The song just fell out that way".

== Music video ==
The music video for "Weren't for the Wind" premiered on March 25, 2025. Langley, who co-directed the video with Wales Toney, stars alongside a love interest played by Kade Hafner and her dog, Crue. In it, Langley is shown getting engaged and telling her fiancé about her career aspirations, though they are met with opposition from him as he makes attempts to stifle her dreams of becoming a country music star, leading to Langley breaking things off and continuing on her solo journey.

A week prior to the release of the music video, Langley posted a teaser on social media that showed the singer sporting a ring on her left hand, which led to engagement rumors, before the singer clarified that it was for the storyline of the video.

== Charts ==
=== Weekly charts ===
Weekly chart performance for "Weren't for the Wind"
Chart (2024–2026)	Peak position
Australia (ARIA)	32
Canada Hot 100 (Billboard)	31
Canada Country (Billboard)	1
Global 200 (Billboard)	104
Ireland (IRMA)	48
UK Singles (Official Charts)	78
UK Country Airplay (Radiomonitor)	1
US Billboard Hot 100	18
US Country Airplay (Billboard)	2
US Hot Country Songs (Billboard)	4

=== Year-end charts ===
Year-end chart performance for "Weren't for the Wind"
Chart (2025)	Position
Canada (Canadian Hot 100)	42
US Billboard Hot 100	71
US Country Airplay (Billboard)	34
US Hot Country Songs (Billboard)	14

== Certifications ==
Certifications for "Weren't for the Wind"
Region	Certification	Certified units/sales
Australia (ARIA)	Gold	35,000^{‡}
Canada (Music Canada)	Platinum	80,000^{‡}
New Zealand (RMNZ)	Platinum	30,000^{‡}
United Kingdom (BPI)	Silver	200,000^{‡}
United States (RIAA)	3× Platinum	3,000,000^{‡}
^{‡} Sales+streaming figures based on certification alone.
