= Way Out Here (EP) =

EP by Riley Green
- Released: April 12, 2024
- Genre: Country
- Length: 25:09
- Label: Nashville Harbor
- Producer: Scott Borchetta; Jimmy Harnen; Dann Huff

Riley Green chronology
Ain't My Last Rodeo (2023)	Way Out Here (2024)	Don't Mind If I Do (2024)

Way Out Here is an EP by American country music singer Riley Green. It was released on April 12, 2024 via Nashville Harbor Records & Entertainment.

== Content ==
Green co-wrote five of the seven tracks on Way Out Here, with the exception being its title track and a cover of Bruce Springsteen's "Atlantic City". The title track was previously recorded by one of its songwriters, Josh Thompson, for his own album also titled Way Out Here (2010), from which it was released as a single. It also reprises "Damn Good Day to Leave", which was released as the second single from Green's second studio album, Ain't My Last Rodeo (2023).

== Track listing ==
Way Out Here track listing
No.	Title	Writer(s)	Length
1.	"Jesus Saves"	Riley Green	3:52
2.	"Way Out Here"	Casey Beathard; David Lee Murphy; Josh Thompson	3:41
3.	"Atlantic City"	Bruce Springsteen	3:15
4.	"Good Morning from Mexico"	Green	3:08
5.	"Damn Good Day to Leave"	Green; Erik Dylan; Jonathan Singleton; Nick Walsh	3:31
6.	"Pick a Place"	Green; Dylan	3:59
7.	"Worst Way"	Green	3:40
Total length:			25:09

== Chart performance ==
Weekly chart performance for Way Out Here
Chart (2024–2026)	Peak position
Australian Country Albums (ARIA)	27
US Billboard 200	149
US Top Country Albums (Billboard)	29
