= Don't Mind If I Do (Riley Green album) =

Studio album by Riley Green
- Released: October 18, 2024
- Studios: Blackbird (Nashville); Sound Stage (Nashville); The Castle (Franklin); Treasure Isle (Nashville); Studio 818 (Nashville); Holler (Franklin); Love Shack (Nashville); Soultrain (Nashville)
- Genre: Country
- Length: 62:00
- Label: Nashville Harbor
- Producers: Dann Huff; Michael Knox

Riley Green chronology
Way Out Here (2024)	Don't Mind If I Do (2024)	Midtown Sessions (2025)

Singles from Don't Mind If I Do
- 1. "Worst Way" Released: February 10, 2025; 2. "Don't Mind If I Do" Released: July 21, 2025; 3. "Change My Mind" Released: January 5, 2026

Don't Mind If I Do is the third studio album by American country music singer Riley Green. The album was released October 18, 2024, via Nashville Harbor Records & Entertainment.

== Content ==
Green wrote or co-wrote 11 of the album's 18 tracks. The album features six of seven tracks previously featured on Green's EP, Way Out Here (2024), including "Damn Good Day to Leave", which was initially included on his second studio album, Ain't My Last Rodeo (2023), from which it was released as a single. The album features collaborations with Luke Bryan ("Reel Problems") and Ella Langley (the title track). The latter marks Green's second collaboration with Langley, following "You Look Like You Love Me" from her debut album, Hungover (2024).

"Worst Way" was released as the album's lead single on February 10, 2025. The title track was released as the album's second single on July 21, 2025. "Change My Mind" was released as the third single on January 5, 2026.

A deluxe reissue of the album was released on August 29, 2025.

== Track listing ==
Don't Mind If I Do track listing
No.	Title	Writer(s)	Length
1.	"That's a Mistake"	Tucker Beathard; Jimi Bell; Travis Denning	4:17
2.	"Change My Mind"	Riley Green; Erik Dylan; Randy Montana	3:19
3.	"Reel Problems" (featuring Luke Bryan)	Green; Dylan; Wyatt McCubbin	3:17
4.	"Turnin' Dirt"	Benjy Davis; McCubbin; Ben Williams	3:02
5.	"Jesus Saves"	Green	3:52
6.	"Too Early to Drink"	Matt Roy	3:29
7.	"Pick a Place"	Green; Dylan	3:59
8.	"Way Out Here"	Casey Beathard; David Lee Murphy; Josh Thompson	3:59
9.	"Waitin' All Day"	Green; Dylan; McCubbin; Lydia Vaughan	3:18
10.	"Chip Off the Ol' Block"	Green; Dylan; Jonathan Singleton	3:08
11.	"Alcohall of Fame"	Green; Kelli Johnson; Drake White	3:30
12.	"Rather Be"	Dan Isbell; Montana	2:51
13.	"Good Morning from Mexico"	Green	3:08
14.	"Torn"	Drake Milligan; Montana; John Pierce	3:21
15.	"Damn Good Day to Leave"	Green; Dylan; Singleton; Nick Walsh	3:31
16.	"Looking Back on This"	Montana; Jameson Rodgers; Justin Wilson	3:32
17.	"Don't Mind If I Do" (featuring Ella Langley)	Green	3:38
18.	"Worst Way"	Green	3:40
Total length:			62:00

Don't Mind If I Do (Deluxe Edition)
No.	Title	Writer(s)	Length
19.	"Make It Rain"	Green; Blake Pendergrass; Walsh	4:12
20.	"Cowboy as It Gets" (featuring Randy Houser)	Green; Beathard; Montana	4:16
21.	"I Just Need You" (featuring Hannah McFarland)	Green; Jessi Alexander; Dylan; McCubbin	4:03
22.	"What Am I Supposed to Do Now"	Green; Brock Berryhill; Dylan; Montana; Bobby Pinson	3:43
23.	"Bet They're Biting"	Green; Dylan; McCubbin	3:24
24.	"One to Willie"	Monty Criswell; Derek George; Montana	3:21
Total length:			85:00

== Personnel ==
Credits are adapted from the album's liner notes and Tidal.

=== Musicians ===
- Riley Green – vocals (all tracks), background vocals (track 17)
- Kris Donegan – acoustic guitar (1–13, 15, 17–24), electric guitar (8, 10, 20)
- Katlin Owen – background vocals (1–7, 9–13, 18–20, 22–24)
- Jerry Roe – drums (1–4, 6, 7, 9–13, 15, 17–22, 24), tambourine (1, 2, 4, 9–11, 21), percussion (7, 12, 15, 17, 18, 22, 24), shaker (19)
- Gordon Mote – keyboards (1), B-3 organ (2, 4, 10, 19–24), Wurlitzer (9), piano (17, 20)
- Rob McNelley – electric guitar (1, 3, 6, 7, 9–16, 18–22, 24), Dobro (5, 23)
- Jimmie Lee Sloas – bass (1, 3, 6, 9–12, 14, 15, 24)
- Paul Franklin – steel guitar (1, 8–10, 24)
- Dann Huff – electric guitar (2, 3, 6, 15, 18, 20–22), mandolin (2, 3, 16, 19), electric guitar solo (2, 7, 10), shaker (5, 23), mini acoustic 12-string guitar (11), acoustic guitar (12, 16, 24), conga (12), hi-string acoustic guitar (13), programming (15, 16, 23), ganjo (15)
- Mark Hill – bass (2, 4, 5, 7, 8, 13, 16–23)
- Tom Bukovac – electric guitar (2, 4, 8, 9, 17)
- Justin Schipper – steel guitar (2, 4, 10, 17)
- Justin Niebank – programming (3, 6–9, 11–13, 15–20, 22)
- Charlie Judge – B-3 organ (3, 6, 8, 11, 15), piano (11), keyboards (12)
- Dan Dugmore – steel guitar (3, 6, 11, 12, 15, 21, 22), lap steel guitar solo (11), lap steel guitar (19)
- Luke Bryan – vocals (3)
- Stuart Duncan – fiddle (5, 11, 13), mandolin (6, 7, 13)
- Alex Wright – piano (5, 7), synthesizer (7), B-3 organ (9, 18), Wurlitzer (9), accordion (13)
- Josh Reedy – background vocals (8, 15, 16)
- Ilya Toshinskiy – acoustic guitar (14), banjo (15)
- Adam Shoenfeld – electric guitar (14, 16)
- Mike Johnson – steel guitar (14, 16)
- Victor Indrizzo – drums (14)
- Cooper Bascom – background vocals (14)
- David Huff – programming (15)
- Danny Rader – acoustic guitar, hi-string acoustic guitar (16)
- Tony Harrell – B-3 organ (16)
- Brad Pemberton – drums (16)
- Blake Bollinger – programming (16)
- Michael Knox – programming (16)
- Ella Langley – vocals, background vocals (17)
- Jenee Fleenor – fiddle (20, 21, 23)
- Randy Houser – vocals (20)
- Hannah McFarland – vocals, background vocals (21)
- Willie Nelson – acoustic guitar (24)

=== Technical and visuals ===
- Dann Huff – production (1–13, 15–24)
- Michael Knox – production (14, 16)
- Julian Raymond – additional production (14)
- Steve Marcantonio – recording (1, 2, 4, 9, 10, 17, 24)
- Joey Stanca – recording (1, 2, 4, 9, 10, 17, 24)
- Drew Bollman – recording (5, 7, 13, 18–24), additional mix engineering (1–13, 15–24)
- Buckley Miller – recording (8, 15)
- Peter Coleman – recording (14, 16)
- Steve Cordray – recording assistance (3, 6, 11, 12)
- Zach Kuhlman – recording assistance (8, 15, 16)
- Jordan Reed – recording assistance (5, 7, 13, 18)
- Micah Wilshire – recording assistance (14, 16)
- Austin Brown – recording assistance (19–23)
- Josh Reedy – additional recording (8, 15, 16)
- Howard Willing – additional recording (14)
- Brandon Epps – additional recording (16)
- Jeff Stevens – Luke Bryan vocal production (3)
- Louis Remenapp – Luke Bryan vocal recording (3)
- Justin Niebank – mixing (1–13, 15–24)
- Chris Lord-Alge – mixing (14)
- Brian Judd – mixing assistance (14)
- Adam Chagnon – additional engineering (14)
- Adam Ayan – mastering
- David Huff – digital editing (1–4, 9–12)
- Chris Small – digital editing (1–4, 6, 8–12, 19–24)
- Mike "Frog" Griffith – production management (1–13, 15–24)
- Shalacy Griffin – production management (14, 16)
- Rose Hutcheson – production management (19–24)
- Harper Smith – photography, cover graphic design
- Sandi Spika – art direction
- Justin Ford – art direction, package graphic design

== Charts ==
=== Weekly charts ===
Weekly chart performance for Don't Mind If I Do
Chart (2024–2025)	Peak position
Canadian Albums (Billboard)	29
US Billboard 200	25
US Top Country Albums (Billboard)	7

=== Year-end charts ===
Year-end chart performance for Don't Mind If I Do
Chart (2025)	Position
US Billboard 200	84
US Top Country Albums (Billboard)	14

== Certifications ==
Certifications for Don't Mind If I Do
Region	Certification	Certified units/sales
United States (RIAA)	Platinum	1,000,000^{‡}
^{‡} Sales+streaming figures based on certification alone.
