= Where Are You Now (Jimmy Harnen song) =

1986 single by Synch

Single by Synch

from the album ...Get the Feelin'
- Released: 1986
- Recorded: 1986
- Genre: Rock
- Length: 4:32
- Label: Columbia
- Songwriters: Jimmy Harnen, Rich Congdon

Synch singles chronology
"Give Love Another Try" (1985)	"Where Are You Now" (1986)	"Should Have Said No" (1987)

"Where Are You Now"

Single by Jimmy Harnen

from the album Can't Fight the Midnight
- B-side: "Only for the Night"
- Released: February 24, 1989
- Genre: Rock
- Length: 4:29
- Label: WTG
- Songwriters: Jimmy Harnen, Rich Congdon

Jimmy Harnen singles chronology
"No Reason in the World" (1989)	"Where Are You Now" (1989)

"Where Are You Now" is a power ballad by the Pennsylvania-based 1980s band Synch. Co-written and sung by Synch band member Jimmy Harnen, the song was initially credited solely to Synch when it was first released in 1986. In 1989, the re-recorded version of the song was released under the name Jimmy Harnen with Synch, or solely to Jimmy Harnen in other territories.

== Background ==
Synch was a band that formed in 1985, with Jimmy Harnen as the drummer. The other band members were lead vocalist Lou Butwin, guitarist Dave Abraham, bassist James A. Donnelly, and keyboardist Chuck Yarmey. Although not the "official" lead vocalist for the group, Harnen was afforded the chance to sing lead on his own composition. "Where Are You Now" was first released on the independent label Micki Records in 1986. After receiving local airplay in the Wilkes-Barre market, Synch got signed to Columbia Records, and "Where Are You Now" was re-recorded and re-released as a single, later also appearing in a live version on Synch's lone album, ...Get the Feelin'. By the time this album was recorded, only Harnen and Yarmey remained from the original line-up, with Harnen now the lead vocalist. The single peaked at No. 77 on the Billboard Hot 100, leading to the band being dropped from Columbia.

However, in 1989, the song gained popularity and received heavy airplay, prompting record executives to re-release the original (major label) recording of the single, now credited to Jimmy Harnen with Synch. WTG, a new label at the time, signed Harnen as a solo artist, and while the song was climbing the charts, he began recording an album for the label. This time, the song peaked at No. 10 on the Billboard Hot 100 in June 1989. It also hit No. 3 on the Adult Contemporary chart. Harnen's debut solo album, Can't Fight the Midnight, was released the same year.
