= Blue Jean Baby =

2025 single by Zach Bryan

Single by Zach Bryan
- Released: January 27, 2025
- Genre: Country rock
- Length: 2:12
- Label: Belting Bronco; Warner
- Songwriter: Zach Bryan
- Producer: Bryan

Zach Bryan singles chronology
"High Road" (2024)	"Blue Jean Baby" (2025)	"Rattlesnake" (2025)

"Blue Jean Baby" is a song by American singer-songwriter Zach Bryan, released on January 27, 2025.

== Background ==
A week before the release, Zach Bryan posted a snippet of the song on social media and revealed it was written and recorded in Philadelphia. He promised to release the song if the Philadelphia Eagles won the 2024 NFC Championship Game. He released it on January 27, 2025, in celebration of the Eagles' victory on the previous day. Bryan then revealed in an Instagram story that he had developed "Blue Jean Baby" into a "half-song" from a demo that he originally teased in September 2023.

== Composition and lyrics ==
"Blue Jean Baby" is a country rock song. The instrumental combines a drum pattern with a guitar riff, as Zach Bryan sings with vigor about his recent romantic entanglements. The first verse depicts him having a hangover in the morning and flashbacking to his interaction with his lover on the night before, fondly remembering she was wearing a bandana and coveralls and kept a burning cigarette in the pocket of her blue jeans. In the chorus, he laments that she has left: "American girls love goodbyes / And I've been gettin' by on pinin' for it / I need to rest my eyes / It's a long way home and it's four in the mornin' / It's a long way home and it's four in the mornin'". In the second verse, Bryan describes finding peace and quiet on an evening in a barroom where he could brood over his melancholy, and yearning to see his lover again in the future.

== Charts ==
=== Weekly charts ===
Weekly chart performance for "Blue Jean Baby"
Chart (2025)	Peak position
Canada Hot 100 (Billboard)	52
New Zealand Hot Singles (RMNZ)	16
US Billboard Hot 100	73
US Hot Country Songs (Billboard)	18
US Hot Rock & Alternative Songs (Billboard)	10

=== Year-end charts ===
Year-end chart performance for "Blue Jean Baby"
Chart (2025)	Position
US Hot Rock & Alternative Songs (Billboard)	39

== Certifications ==
Certifications for "Blue Jean Baby"
Region	Certification	Certified units/sales
Canada (Music Canada)	Platinum	80,000^{‡}
United States (RIAA)	Gold	500,000^{‡}
^{‡} Sales+streaming figures based on certification alone.
