= Dream Come True (song) =

Single by Carly Pearce

from the album Honest Woman
- Released: November 14, 2025
- Genre: Country
- Length: 2:57
- Label: Big Machine
- Songwriters: Carly Pearce; Tofer Brown; Lauren Hungate; Emily Weisband
- Producers: Ben West; Carly Pearce

Carly Pearce singles chronology
"Truck on Fire" (2024)	"Dream Come True" (2025)	"If I Don't Leave I'm Gonna Stay" (2026)

Music video
- Dream Come True on YouTube

"Dream Come True" is a song by American country music singer Carly Pearce. It was released on November 14, 2025, as the lead single from her fifth studio album, Honest Woman.

== Background ==
Pearce began teasing the song on her Instagram several weeks leading up to its release, sharing hints to the song's title and lyrics in the captions of her social media posts. She officially announced the title and artwork of "Dream Come True" alongside its digital release on November 14, 2025.

== Content ==
Following 17 years in the industry, Pearce needed to "fall back in love with music" and set out to create the most "honest era" of her career. Pearce co-wrote the song with Tofer Brown, Lauren Hungate, and Emily Weisband, and co-produced it with Ben West. Hungate brought the initial concept for the song to Pearce, who was inspired to write the song after moving into a house on a cul-de-sac surrounded by "women [her] age with husbands and growing families", which led her to write "about those sacrifices we make when chasing our dreams." Described as "an unfiltered look into the realities of fame", the song explores the darker side of a touring musician's career and the scrutiny they face being in the constant public eye, with Pearce acknowledging that she's living out her dream, even if it comes with unforeseen costs. The song ends with Pearce reflecting on her mom's health issues and the sacrifices she made to help her daughter achieve her dreams.

== Music video ==
The music video for "Dream Come True" was directed by Natalie Sakstrup and premiered on November 14, 2025. In it, Pearce is shown seated alone at a lit vanity that is covered with pictures of her family, as members of her team move around her on set, highlighting her "emotional loneliness".

== Chart performance ==
"Dream Come True" debuted (and peaked) at number 40 on the Billboard Country Airplay chart dated November 22, 2025, and pulled in adds from 93 stations upon immediate impact at country radio.

== Charts ==
Weekly chart performance for "Dream Come True"
Chart (2025)	Peak position
Canada Country (Billboard)	53
UK Country Airplay (Radiomonitor)	5
US Country Airplay (Billboard)	40
