= This World's a Giant =

2024 single by Zach Bryan

Single by Zach Bryan
- Released: November 7, 2024
- Genre: Country
- Length: 3:36
- Label: Belting Bronco; Warner
- Songwriter: Zach Bryan
- Producer: Bryan

Zach Bryan singles chronology
"Pink Skies" (2024)	"This World's a Giant" (2024)	"High Road" (2024)

"This World's a Giant" is a song by American singer-songwriter Zach Bryan, released on November 7, 2024, alongside his song "High Road".

== Background ==
Zach Bryan initially teased the song on X in January 2024. In July 2024, he shared a video snippet of himself performing an acoustic version of the song.

== Composition and lyrics ==
The instrumental consists of piano, acoustic guitars and horns that appear to be influenced by the music of Bon Iver and jazz. Zach Bryan sings about looking for peaceful, quiet and solitude moments away from the outside world where there are other pressures he must confront, describing the ideal place that is his room in the first verse: "There's guitars ringin' now from the top floor of this house / That I've learned to rest my soul inside / Be still, be quiet, this world's a giant / That I don't feel like facing tonight". He depicts himself as having a girlfriend who disapproves certain aspects of his lifestyle and hoping to improve himself in order to set a good example for their children, additionally reminding himself of their responsibility to take care of their children. He also apologizes to God for his shortcomings that prevent him from becoming the person he wants to be, and asks for forgiveness. In the final verse, Bryan recounts the events from the beginning verse but finishes in a more optimistic, auspicious tone. Heaven Schmitt, leader of the New York indie band Grumpy, sings backup harmonies in the song.

== Charts ==
=== Weekly charts ===
Weekly chart performance for "This World's a Giant"
Chart (2024)	Peak position
Canada Hot 100 (Billboard)	41
Global 200 (Billboard)	160
Ireland (IRMA)	32
New Zealand Hot Singles (RMNZ)	3
UK Singles (OCC)	73
US Billboard Hot 100	49
US Hot Country Songs (Billboard)	12
US Hot Rock & Alternative Songs (Billboard)	9

=== Year-end charts ===
Year-end chart performance for "This World's a Giant"
Chart (2025)	Position
US Hot Rock & Alternative Songs (Billboard)	80

== Certifications ==
Certifications for "This World's a Giant"
Region	Certification	Certified units/sales
Canada (Music Canada)	Gold	40,000^{‡}
^{‡} Sales+streaming figures based on certification alone.
