= Can't Fight the Midnight =

Studio album by Jimmy Harnen
- Released: 1989
- Studio: Ocean Way Recording, Rumbo Recorders, Record Plant, The Warehouse
- Genre: Rock
- Length: 46:37
- Label: WTG
- Producer: David DeVore and Jimmy Harnen (tracks 1–10), Jerry Hludzik (track 11), Rick Manwiller (track 11), Bill Kelly (track 11)

Singles from Can't Fight the Moonlight
- 1. "Where Are You Now" Released: February 24, 1989

Can't Fight the Midnight is the debut and only solo album by American singer Jimmy Harnen, drummer of the band Synch, which was released in 1989. It contains the hit power ballad, "Where Are You Now", which charted at number 10 on the Billboard Hot 100.

== Track listing ==
1. "Hello" (4:16)
2. "When the Midnight Comes" (4:27)
3. "If She Cries" (5:14)
4. "All Those Tears" (3:51)
5. "Little Nikki" (3:52)
6. "I Don't Mind" (3:57)
7. "No Reason in the World" (4:22)
8. "Southern Lady" (3:50)
9. "For All the Wrong Reasons" (4:25)
10. "Boy in Love" (3:54)
11. "Where Are You Now" (4:29)

== Personnel ==
=== Tracks 1–10 ===
- Steve Lukather, Albert Lee, Tim Pierce, Michael Thompson: Guitars
- John Philip Shenale: Keyboards
- Randy Jackson: Bass
- Mike Baird: Drums, percussion

=== Track 11 ===
- Bill Kelly: Guitars, backing vocals
- Rick Manwiller: Keyboards, backing vocals
- Jerry G. Hludzik: Bass
- Chaz Evanski: Drums, percussion
