= There Was This Girl =

Single by Riley Green

from the album Different 'Round Here
- Released: August 6, 2018
- Genre: Country
- Length: 3:14
- Label: BMLG
- Songwriters: Riley Green; Erik Dylan
- Producer: Dann Huff

Riley Green singles chronology
"There Was This Girl" (2018)	"In Love by Now" (2019)

Music video
- "There Was This Girl" on YouTube

"There Was This Girl" is the debut single by American country music singer Riley Green. It was released as a promotional single in June 2018 and sent to radio as the lead single from his debut studio album, Different 'Round Here (2019), on August 6, 2018. Green wrote the song with Erik Dylan, and Dann Huff served as producer.

== Content ==
The song is a story song about the impact that various women have had in the narrator's life. Billy Dukes of Taste of Country wrote that it "finds the narrow space between calls for a return to a more timeless country sound and seeks to banish the word 'bro' from the dictionary. The debut single is smart storytelling for the everyman. The trick Green and his co-writers pull is using successive choruses to advance his narrative without sacrificing the country-rocker's singalong quality. He swaps only a word or phrase each time, slowly turning what starts as an adolescent adventure reminiscent of Chris Cagle's 'Chicks Dig It' into a grown man's memory."

== Music video ==
Green said that the song's music video (directed by Peter Zavadil) was shot by fans of his, while he performed a concert in a bar in his home state of Alabama. He told Taste of Country that "We actually let the fans shoot the video, and literally passed the camera from fan to fan."

Green performed the song on Today on January 7, 2019.

== Charts ==
=== Weekly charts ===
Chart (2018–2019)	Peak position
Canada (Canadian Hot 100)	75
Canada Country (Billboard)	1
US Billboard Hot 100	70
US Country Airplay (Billboard)	3
US Hot Country Songs (Billboard)	11

=== Year-end charts ===
Chart (2019)	Position
US Country Airplay (Billboard)	22
US Hot Country Songs (Billboard)	53

== Certifications ==
Region	Certification	Certified units/sales
Australia (ARIA)	Gold	35,000^{‡}
Canada (Music Canada)	3× Platinum	240,000^{‡}
United States (RIAA)	2× Platinum	2,000,000^{‡}
^{‡} Sales+streaming figures based on certification alone.
