= Different 'Round Here (song) =

Single by Riley Green featuring Luke Combs

from the album Ain't My Last Rodeo
- Released: May 11, 2023
- Genre: Country
- Length: 2:55
- Label: BMLG
- Songwriters: Randy Montana; Jonathan Singleton; Riley Green
- Producers: Dann Huff; Jimmy Harnen

Riley Green singles chronology
"Half of Me" (2022)	"Different 'Round Here" (2023)	"Damn Good Day to Leave" (2024)

Luke Combs singles chronology
"Fast Car" (2023)	"Different 'Round Here" (2023)	"Life Goes On" (2023)

Music video
- "Different 'Round Here" on YouTube

"Different 'Round Here" is a song by American country music singer Riley Green. Originally recorded by Green on his 2019 album Different 'Round Here, it was re-recorded in 2023 as a duet with Luke Combs and released on May 11, 2023 as the lead single from Green's second studio album Ain't My Last Rodeo. The song reached number two on the Country Airplay chart during the 10-week reign of "World on Fire" by Nate Smith.

== History and content ==
Green originally recorded "Different 'Round Here" for his 2019 debut album Different 'Round Here. He wrote the song with Randy Montana and Jonathan Singleton. Although the original version of the song was never released as a single, Taste of Country writer Grace Lenehan Vaughn noted that it was a "fan favorite". In 2023, Green re-recorded it as a duet with Combs and issued it as a single from his 2023 album Ain't My Last Rodeo. Madeleine O'Connell of Country Now similarly noted the song's success on streaming platforms prior to its release as a single. Vaughn described the song as "preaching some of the traditional values of small town America".

== Charts ==
=== Weekly charts ===
Weekly chart performance
Chart (2023–2024)	Peak position
Canada Hot 100 (Billboard)	89
Canada Country (Billboard)	11
US Billboard Hot 100	60
US Country Airplay (Billboard)	2
US Hot Country Songs (Billboard)	15

=== Year-end charts ===
Annual chart rankings
Chart (2024)	Position
US Country Airplay (Billboard)	32
US Hot Country Songs (Billboard)	59
US Radio Songs (Billboard)	71

== Certifications ==
Certifications for "Different 'Round Here"
Region	Certification	Certified units/sales
Canada (Music Canada)	2× Platinum	160,000^{‡}
New Zealand (RMNZ)	Gold	15,000^{‡}
United States (RIAA)	Platinum	1,000,000^{‡}
^{‡} Sales+streaming figures based on certification alone.
