= Different 'Round Here =

Studio album by Riley Green
- Released: September 20, 2019
- Genre: Country
- Length: 49:03
- Label: BMLG
- Producers: Dann Huff; Tyler Reeve; Ilya Toshinsky

Riley Green chronology
| Get That Man a Beer (2019) | Different 'Round Here (2019) | Behind the Bar (2021) |

Singles from Different 'Round Here
- 1. "There Was This Girl" Released: August 6, 2018; 2. "In Love by Now" Released: April 29, 2019; 3. "I Wish Grandpas Never Died" Released: September 20, 2019

Different 'Round Here is the debut studio album by American country music singer Riley Green. It was released on September 20, 2019, by BMLG Records. The album was supported by three singles: "There Was This Girl", "In Love by Now", and "I Wish Grandpas Never Died". The title track was later re-recorded as a duet with Luke Combs and released as a single in 2023 from Green's second album Ain't My Last Rodeo.

== Content ==
The album includes three singles: "There Was This Girl", "In Love by Now", and "I Wish Grandpas Never Died". In addition to these, Green also released "Numbers on the Cars" and "Bettin' Man" digitally prior to the album's release. Dann Huff is the album's producer.

== Critical reception ==
Stephen Thomas Erlewine of AllMusic wrote that "What keeps Different 'Round Here humming is how Green manages to avoid the temptation of succumbing to straight-ahead revivalism. He takes old-fashioned attitude and simple, lean arrangements and plays them with a fresh directness. His straight-ahead nature may indeed lead him toward cornball territory, but the album on the whole is distinguished by how Green wears his heart on his sleeve."

== Commercial performance ==
The album has sold 11,200 copies in the United States as of March 2020. It has since been certified Gold by the RIAA.

== Track listing ==
Different 'Round Here track listing
| No. | Title | Writer(s) | Length |
|---|---|---|---|
| 1. | "There Was This Girl" | Riley Green; Erik Dylan | 3:14 |
| 2. | "Different 'Round Here" | R. Green; Randy Montana; Jonathan Singleton | 3:03 |
| 3. | "Same Old Song" | R. Green; Dylan; Singleton | 3:08 |
| 4. | "In a Truck Right Now" | R. Green; Dylan; Montana | 3:51 |
| 5. | "Hard to Leave" | R. Green; Jessi Alexander; Montana | 3:35 |
| 6. | "I Wish Grandpas Never Died" | R. Green; Lendon Bonds; Buford Green | 4:10 |
| 7. | "Bettin' Man" | R. Green; Dylan; Singleton | 3:08 |
| 8. | "Numbers on the Cars" | R. Green | 3:39 |
| 9. | "My First Everything" | R. Green; Dylan; Tyler Reeve; Justin Weaver | 3:44 |
| 10. | "In Love by Now" | R. Green; Rhett Akins; Marv Green; Ben Hayslip | 3:26 |
| 11. | "Get That Man a Beer" | R. Green; Singleton; Channing Wilson | 3:22 |
| 12. | "Break Up More Often" | R. Green; Chris DuBois; Lynn Hutton | 3:23 |
| 13. | "Runnin' with an Angel" | R. Green | 3:56 |
| 14. | "Outlaws Like Us" | Dylan | 3:24 |
| Total length: | | | 49:03 |

== Personnel ==
Adapted from liner notes.

- Mike Brignardello – bass guitar
- Dan Dugmore – pedal steel guitar
- Shawn Fichter – drums
- Paul Franklin – pedal steel guitar
- Riley Green – lead vocals
- Lee Hendricks – bass guitar
- Dann Huff – electric guitar, mandolin, percussion
- Charlie Judge – Hammond B-3 organ, keyboards
- Chris McHugh – drums
- Rob McNelley – electric guitar
- Billy Nobel – keyboards
- Justin Ostrander – electric guitar
- Russ Pahl – pedal steel guitar
- Danny Rader – acoustic guitar
- Jerry Roe – drums
- Scotty Sanders – pedal steel guitar
- Jimmie Lee Sloas – bass guitar
- Russell Terrell – background vocals
- Ilya Toshinsky – acoustic guitar, electric guitar, mandolin

== Charts ==
=== Weekly charts ===
Weekly chart performance for "Different 'Round Here"
| Chart (2019) | Peak position |
|---|---|
| US Billboard 200 | 95 |
| US Top Country Albums (Billboard) | 11 |

=== Year-end charts ===
Year-end chart performance for "Different 'Round Here"
| Chart (2019) | Position |
|---|---|
| US Top Country Albums (Billboard) | 88 |
| Chart (2020) | Position |
| US Top Country Albums (Billboard) | 40 |

== Certifications ==
Certifications for Different 'Round Here
| Region | Certification | Certified units/sales |
|---|---|---|
| United States (RIAA) | Gold | 500,000^{‡} |
^{‡} Sales+streaming figures based on certification alone.
