= Change My Mind (Riley Green song) =

2024 song by Riley Green

Single by Riley Green

from the album Don't Mind If I Do
- Released: January 5, 2026
- Genre: Country
- Length: 3:19
- Label: Nashville Harbor
- Songwriters: Riley Green; Erik Dylan; Randy Montana
- Producer: Dann Huff

Riley Green singles chronology
"Don't Mind If I Do" (2025)	"Change My Mind" (2026)	"If I Don't Leave I'm Gonna Stay" (2026)

Lyric video
- "Change My Mind" on YouTube

"Change My Mind" is a song by American country music singer Riley Green. It was released on January 5, 2026, as the third single from his third studio album, Don't Mind If I Do (2025). Green co-wrote the song with Erik Dylan and Randy Montana, and it was produced by Dann Huff.

== Composition ==
The song contains electric guitar and drums, with faint steel guitar in the background. Lyrically, the protagonist tries to accept the end of a relationship, but remains emotionally attached to his former lover and considers returning to her. In the opening lines, he rejects her advances, noting that their past attempts to reconcile have repeatedly failed. However, in the chorus, he reveals his wish to be rekindled with her and teasingly asks her to persuade him. He goes on to admit that he cannot resist her and is attracted to the chaos she brings into his life. Eventually, the narrator feels confident that they will fall for each other again tonight.

== Charts ==
Chart performance for "Change My Mind"
Chart (2026)	Peak position
Canada Hot 100 (Billboard)	42
Canada Country (Billboard)	2
US Billboard Hot 100	24
US Country Airplay (Billboard)	2
US Hot Country Songs (Billboard)	5

== Certifications ==
Region	Certification	Certified units/sales
Canada (Music Canada)	Platinum	80,000^{‡}
United States (RIAA)	Platinum	1,000,000^{‡}
^{‡} Sales+streaming figures based on certification alone.
