= Worst Way =

2024 song by Riley Green

Single by Riley Green

from the album Don't Mind If I Do
- Released: February 10, 2025
- Genre: Country
- Length: 3:40
- Label: Nashville Harbor
- Songwriter: Riley Green
- Producers: Dann Huff; Scott Borchetta; Jimmy Harnen

Riley Green singles chronology
| "You Look Like You Love Me" (2024) | "Worst Way" (2025) | "Don't Mind If I Do" (2025) |

Music video
- "Worst Way" on YouTube

"Worst Way" is a song by American singer-songwriter Riley Green, first released on March 29, 2024, as a promotional single from his EP Way Out Here (2024). It was sent to country radio on February 10, 2025, as the lead single from his third studio album Don't Mind If I Do (2024). In June 2025, it became Green's third number-one on the Country Airplay chart, and his first as a solo artist.

== Background ==
In an August 2024 interview on The Kelleigh Bannen Show on Apple Music Country, Riley Green stated that he wrote the song years ago and originally called it "When She Comes Home Tonight". He was covering "Like a Wrecking Ball" by Eric Church at the time, but decided to compose a song that evoked similar feelings, which resulted in "Worst Way". He additionally took inspiration from "Slow Dancing in a Burning Room" by John Mayer.

== Composition and lyrics ==
The song uses minimal production, using a "simple drum beat and twangy guitar strums". The first verse finds Riley Green choosing not to approach his lover with traditional romantic gestures ("Tonight, I ain't bringin' no wine / Tonight, I ain't bringin' no roses") but implies he wants to engage in sexual activity with her in the bedroom. This sets the tone for the chorus, where he sings: "I want you in the worst way, my hands are needin' your hips / Want the first taste of whiskey to be off your lips / So close all the blinds, lock all the doors / Put away anything that'll break / Baby, I need you tonight / Let's see how much love we can make / I want you in the worst way". In the second verse, he assures that he still loves to "wine and dine" with her, but has not planned it for that evening.

== Music video ==
The music video premiered on February 12, 2025, after Riley Green teased several snippets of it in the days prior. It starts with Green driving to his lover's (Texas model Stephanie Ludwig) house in a Ford Bronco with flowers and wine, while she prepares a candlelit dinner. Green and the woman kiss as they stumble around the house and take their clothes off, being unable to stop even while breaking glass and punching holes in walls, during which Green gives a thumbs-up to a photo of an old man doing the same gesture. In the following scene, they go fine dining at a restaurant and make out in public, as people stare at them in shock. The woman crawls across the table and Green's shirt flies off again. After that, they recreate a scene from the film Bull Durham, in which Green eats a bowl of cereal in a robe in the kitchen while the woman sits on the counter wearing only her red lingerie and Green's sport coat. Once more, two kiss, hold and carry each other to the bedroom, where Green kicks over a lamp in the process.

== Charts ==
=== Weekly charts ===
Weekly chart performance for "Worst Way"
| Chart (2024–2025) | Peak position |
|---|---|
| Canada Hot 100 (Billboard) | 28 |
| Canada Country (Billboard) | 3 |
| Global 200 (Billboard) | 187 |
| US Billboard Hot 100 | 20 |
| US Country Airplay (Billboard) | 1 |
| US Hot Country Songs (Billboard) | 5 |

=== Year-end charts ===
2024 year-end chart performance for "Worst Way"
| Chart (2024) | Position |
|---|---|
| US Hot Country Songs (Billboard) | 63 |

2025 year-end chart performance for "Worst Way"
| Chart (2025) | Position |
|---|---|
| Canada (Canadian Hot 100) | 28 |
| US Billboard Hot 100 | 35 |
| US Country Airplay (Billboard) | 15 |
| US Hot Country Songs (Billboard) | 38 |

== Certifications ==
Certifications for "Worst Way"
| Region | Certification | Certified units/sales |
|---|---|---|
| Brazil (Pro-Música Brasil) | Gold | 20,000^{‡} |
| Canada (Music Canada) | 4× Platinum | 320,000^{‡} |
| New Zealand (RMNZ) | Platinum | 30,000^{‡} |
| United States (RIAA) | 4× Platinum | 4,000,000^{‡} |
^{‡} Sales+streaming figures based on certification alone.
