= I Wish Grandpas Never Died =

Single by Riley Green

from the album Different 'Round Here
- Released: September 20, 2019
- Genre: Country
- Length: 4:08
- Label: BMLG
- Songwriters: Riley Green; Buford Green; Lendon Bonds
- Producer: Dann Huff

Riley Green singles chronology
"In Love by Now" (2019)	"I Wish Grandpas Never Died" (2019)	"If It Wasn't for Trucks" (2020)

Lyric video
- "I Wish Grandpas Never Died" on YouTube

"I Wish Grandpas Never Died" is a song co-written and recorded by American country music singer Riley Green. It is the third single from his debut studio album Different 'Round Here.

== History ==
Green had written the song and performed it on tour before adding it to the tracklist of his debut album. According to him, he was persuaded to record the song by Brad Paisley. The song caused waves on country radio, for the lyric "I wish country music still got played on country radio." A radio edit was created to edit out the jab towards pop country, and the lyric was replaced with "I wish George Jones still got played on country radio."

The song is a tribute to Green's grandfathers, Buford Green and Lendon Bonds, both of whom are also credited as co-writers on the song.

== Commercial performance ==
The song has sold 123,000 copies in the United States as of March 2020.

== Charts ==
=== Weekly charts ===
Chart (2019–2020)	Peak position
Canada Hot 100 (Billboard)	95
Canada Country (Billboard)	11
US Billboard Hot 100	66
US Country Airplay (Billboard)	12
US Hot Country Songs (Billboard)	12

=== Year-end charts ===
Chart (2019)	Position
US Hot Country Songs (Billboard)	91

Chart (2020)	Position
US Country Airplay (Billboard)	54
US Hot Country Songs (Billboard)	47

== Certifications ==
Certifications for "I Wish Grandpas Never Died"
Region	Certification	Certified units/sales
Australia (ARIA)	Gold	35,000^{‡}
Canada (Music Canada)	3× Platinum	240,000^{‡}
United States (RIAA)	3× Platinum	3,000,000^{‡}
^{‡} Sales+streaming figures based on certification alone.
