= High Road (Zach Bryan song) =

2024 single by Zach Bryan

Single by Zach Bryan
- Released: November 7, 2024
- Genre: Country
- Length: 3:19
- Label: Belting Bronco; Warner
- Songwriter: Zach Bryan
- Producer: Bryan

Zach Bryan singles chronology
"This World's a Giant" (2024)	"High Road" (2024)	"Blue Jean Baby" (2025)

"High Road" is a song by American singer-songwriter Zach Bryan, released on November 7, 2024, alongside his song "This World's a Giant".

== Background ==
On November 7, 2024, Zach Bryan wrote on Instagram about the situation that drove him to write the song:

After not being home for a year and a half I drove out to my mothers gravestone in the dead of night a few days back on familiar Oklahoma roads and I came to realize just like in the past, that she never would call me again

Told her I quit touring because I got accepted to get my masters in Paris next year, I told her I was back in Oklahoma, told her about all my best friends in New York and all the nights we howled with the moon, told her about the immeasurable laughter my band and me have shared these last five years, all the calluses on my finger tips, every tear shed, told her about making it on The Rolling Stone and most importantly told her about porch swinging with my beautiful sister.

I wrote the chorus for this song a month or two back and finished it when I realized I was blessed with all these things.

The song was also released amid his highly-publicized breakup with Internet personality Brianna "Chickenfry" LaPaglia and her allegations of emotional abuse against him.

== Composition and lyrics ==
The song features electric guitar in the instrumental and backing vocals performed by Heaven Schmitt, leader of the New York indie band Grumpy. In the opening verse, Zach Bryan laments the failure of a recent relationship, a drug-fueled imagination that he was in love with his partner and a past romantic encounter with her ("Adderall and white-lace bras that makes you fall in love / You left your blue jeans in my pickup truck"), before expressing frustration that his friends in New York City lack "self-control and empathy" and waste their time drinking in the bar but admitting he misses the city more than his home. He ends the verse singing, "Everyone is tellin' me that I need help or therapy / But all I need is to be left alone". In the chorus, Bryan addresses the death of his mother ("I'vе waited by the telеphone all fuckin' night / For someone that ain't ever gonna call"), which he reflects upon with memories of spending time with her in the second verse.

== Charts ==
=== Weekly charts ===
Weekly chart performance for "High Road"
Chart (2024)	Peak position
Canada Hot 100 (Billboard)	28
Global 200 (Billboard)	74
Ireland (IRMA)	29
New Zealand Hot Singles (RMNZ)	2
UK Singles (Official Charts)	66
US Billboard Hot 100	29
US Hot Country Songs (Billboard)	6
US Hot Rock & Alternative Songs (Billboard)	6

=== Year-end charts ===
Year-end chart performance for "High Road"
Chart (2025)	Position
US Hot Country Songs (Billboard)	59
US Hot Rock & Alternative Songs (Billboard)	20

== Certifications ==
Certifications for "High Road"
Region	Certification	Certified units/sales
Canada (Music Canada)	Platinum	80,000^{‡}
United States (RIAA)	Platinum	1,000,000^{‡}
^{‡} Sales+streaming figures based on certification alone.
