= Ain't My Last Rodeo =

Studio album by Riley Green
- Released: October 13, 2023
- Genre: Country
- Length: 39:27
- Label: BMLG
- Producers: Dann Huff; Michael Knox

Riley Green chronology
Behind the Bar (2021)	Ain't My Last Rodeo (2023)	Way Out Here (2024)

Singles from Ain't My Last Rodeo
- 1. "Different 'Round Here" Released: May 11, 2023; 2. "Damn Good Day to Leave" Released: March 18, 2024

Ain't My Last Rodeo is the second studio album by the American country singer Riley Green. The album was released October 13, 2023, by BMLG Records.

== Content ==
"Different 'Round Here" was released on May 11, 2023, as the album's lead single. It was previously featured as the title track to Riley Green's 2019 debut album, but was re-recorded for Ain't My Last Rodeo to include guest vocals from Luke Combs.

"Damn Good Day to Leave" was released as the second single from the album on March 18, 2024.

== Critical reception ==
Rating it three out of five stars, Stephen Thomas Erlewine of AllMusic wrote that Green "plays this kind of retro minded country pop with an amiable ease."

== Track listing ==
Ain't My Last Rodeo track listing
No.	Title	Writer(s)	Length
1.	"Damn Country Music"	Jessi Alexander; Cary Barlowe; Josh Thompson	3:36
2.	"They Don't Make 'Em Like That No More"	Riley Green; Chris Lindsey; Aimee Mayo	3:15
3.	"Mississippi or Me"	Green; Tyler Reeve; Thompson	3:30
4.	"Different 'Round Here" (featuring Luke Combs)	Green; Randy Montana; Jonathan Singleton	2:55
5.	"Ain't Like I Can Hide It"	Green; Chris DuBois; Bobby Pinson	3:01
6.	"Copenhagen in a Cadillac" (featuring Jelly Roll)	Green; Erik Dylan; Wyatt McCubbin	2:32
7.	"Damn Good Day to Leave"	Green; Dylan; Singleton; Nick Walsh	3:31
8.	"My Last Rodeo"	Green	3:43
9.	"Workin' on Me"	Green; Rhett Akins; Montana	3:36
10.	"Raised Up Right"	Green; Jeremy Bussey; DuBois; Lynn Hutton	3:13
11.	"God Made a Good Ol' Boy"	Green; Dylan; McCubbin; Singleton	3:02
12.	"Ain't My Damn to Give"	Tucker Beathard; Ben Simonetti; Singleton	3:27
Total length:			39:27

== Personnel ==
Credits are adapted from Tidal.

=== Musicians ===
- Riley Green – vocals
- Jimmie Lee Sloas – bass guitar (tracks 1–7, 10–12)
- Josh Reedy – background vocals (1, 3–9, 12)
- Charlie Judge – keyboards (1), Hammond B3 (3–7, 9), piano (6), accordion (8), synthesizer (12)
- Kris Donegan – acoustic guitar (1, 3, 5–7, 9, 12), electric guitar (3, 5, 6)
- Evan Hutchings – drums, percussion (1, 3, 5)
- Derek Wells – electric guitar (1, 3, 5), acoustic guitar (1)
- Stuart Duncan – fiddle (1, 3, 5)
- Rob McNelley – electric guitar (2, 4, 6, 7, 10, 11)
- Ilya Toshinskiy – acoustic guitar (2, 4, 9–11), mandolin (4), banjo (7)
- Cooper Bascom – background vocals (2, 10, 11)
- Victor Indrizzo – drums (2, 10, 11)
- Adam Shoenfeld – electric guitar (2, 10, 11)
- Mike Johnson – steel guitar (2, 10, 11)
- Dann Huff – electric guitar (3, 4, 7, 9), mandolin (3, 6), programming (4, 5, 7); acoustic guitar, Dobro guitar (8)
- Justin Niebank – programming (3–7, 9)
- David Huff – programming (3–5, 7, 9)
- Dan Dugmore – steel guitar (4–7, 12)
- Chris McHugh – drums, percussion (4)
- Luke Combs – vocals (4)
- Jerry Roe – drums (6, 7, 12), percussion (7, 12)
- Eric Darken – percussion (6, 12)
- Jelly Roll – vocals (6)
- Mark Hill – bass guitar (9)
- Tom Bukovac – electric guitar (9)
- Paul Franklin – steel guitar (9)
- Micah Wilshire – electric guitar (10)
- Jim Hoke – harmonica (12)

=== Technical ===
- Dann Huff – production (1, 3–9, 12), engineering (8)
- Michael Knox – production (2, 10, 11)
- Julian Raymond – additional production (2, 10, 11)
- Buckley Miller – engineering (1, 3, 5–7, 9, 12)
- Brandon Epps – engineering, digital editing (2, 10, 11)
- Micah Wilshire – engineering (2, 10, 11)
- Peter Coleman – engineering (2, 10, 11)
- Chip Matthews – engineering (4)
- Steve Marcantonio – engineering (4)
- Josh Reedy – additional engineering (1, 3, 5–9, 12)
- Howard Willing – additional engineering, digital editing (2, 10, 11)
- Zach Kuhlman – engineering assistance (1, 3, 5–7, 9, 12)
- Sean Badum – engineering assistance (4)
- Drew Bollman – mixing (1, 3–9, 12)
- Justin Niebank – mixing (1, 3–9, 12)
- Adam Chagnon – mixing (2, 10, 11)
- Chris Lord-Alge – mixing (2, 10, 11)
- Brian Judd – mixing assistance (2, 10, 11)
- Adam Ayan – mastering (1, 3–9, 12)
- Ted Jensen – mastering (2, 10, 11)
- David Huff – digital editing (1, 3–9, 12)
- Chris Small – digital editing (1, 3–7, 9, 12)
- Mike Griffith – production coordination (1, 3–9, 12)
- Shalacy Griffin – production coordination (2, 10, 11)
- Jimmy Harnen – executive production
- Scott Borchetta – executive production

== Chart performance ==
Weekly chart performance for Ain't My Last Rodeo
Chart (2023)	Peak position
US Billboard 200	79
US Top Country Albums (Billboard)	15
