= Don't Mind If I Do (song) =

2024 song by Riley Green featuring Ella Langley

Single by Riley Green featuring Ella Langley

from the album Don't Mind If I Do
- Released: July 21, 2025
- Genre: Country
- Length: 3:38
- Label: Nashville Harbor
- Songwriter: Riley Green
- Producer: Dann Huff

Riley Green singles chronology
"Worst Way" (2024)	"Don't Mind If I Do" (2025)	"Change My Mind" (2026)

Ella Langley singles chronology
"Weren't for the Wind" (2024)	"Don't Mind If I Do" (2025)	"Hell at Night" (2025)

Lyric video
- "Don't Mind If I Do" on YouTube

"Don't Mind If I Do" is a song written and recorded by American country music singer Riley Green. First released on September 6, 2024, as a promotional single from his third studio album of the same name (2024), it was released as the album's second single to country radio on July 21, 2025. It features American country music singer Ella Langley and was produced by Dann Huff.

== Background ==
Green first teased the song in mid-June 2024 via a video of him playing an acoustic version of the song. He had written the song as a duet. While Green was touring with Langley in the United States, he asked her to sing the portion intended for the other vocalist. Initially, Green was only planning to use Langley's recording as a reference track, but decided to keep her on the song as he believed she sang it better than anyone else could have. It marked the second collaboration between the artists following "You Look Like You Love Me" from Langley's debut album, Hungover.

== Composition ==
The song contains acoustic guitar, and introduces a gentle drum pattern and faint steel guitar as it progresses. The lyrics depict Green drinking whiskey to forget about his ex-girlfriend while wishing to rekindle the relationship. He secretly wants to stop by her house to request it and hopes she does not mind that he still has feelings for her. In the second verse, Langley sings backing vocals, indicating that she also misses him, and Green details that his attempts to let go have nearly succeeded, but he always succumbs to his temptations to start drinking again. The more he drinks, the stronger his desire to reconcile with her. Langley takes the lead in the final chorus as she sings from his ex's perspective, in which she wants him to tell her how he truly feels and does not mind if he does the things he craves.

== Live performances ==
Green and Langley performed the song on The Voice during the season 26 finale on December 10, 2024.

== Charts ==
=== Weekly charts ===
Weekly chart performance for "Don't Mind If I Do"
Chart (2025–2026)	Peak position
Canada Hot 100 (Billboard)	30
Canada Country (Billboard)	1
US Billboard Hot 100	23
US Country Airplay (Billboard)	1
US Hot Country Songs (Billboard)	5

=== Year-end charts ===
Year-end chart performance for "Don't Mind If I Do"
Chart (2025)	Position
US Hot Country Songs (Billboard)	45

== Certifications ==
Certifications for "Don't Mind If I Do"
Region	Certification	Certified units/sales
New Zealand (RMNZ)	Gold	15,000^{‡}
United States (RIAA)	2× Platinum	2,000,000^{‡}
^{‡} Sales+streaming figures based on certification alone.
