= Hungover (album) =

Studio album by Ella Langley
- Released: August 2, 2024
- Genre: Country
- Length: 45:08
- Labels: Sawgod; Columbia
- Producer: Will Bundy

Ella Langley chronology
Excuse the Mess (2023)	Hungover (2024)	Dandelion (2026)

Singles from Hungover
- 1. "You Look Like You Love Me" Released: June 21, 2024

Singles from Still Hungover
- 1. "Weren't for the Wind" Released: October 4, 2024

Hungover is the debut studio album by American country music singer Ella Langley. It was released through Sawgod and Columbia Records on August 2, 2024.

== Content ==
Langley co-wrote all of the album's 14 tracks, with Will Bundy producing the project. The title track, "Paint the Town Blue", "Nicotine", and "You Look Like You Love Me" were all issued ahead of the album's release as promotional singles. The latter, a duet with Riley Green, became Langley's first entry on the Billboard Hot 100, debuting at number 53, and was released as her debut single to country radio on August 5, 2024.

Langley promoted the album with her first headlining tour, The Hungover Tour, beginning on August 15, 2024.

A deluxe reissue of the album, titled Still Hungover, was released on November 1, 2024. "Weren't for the Wind" was released as the first single from the reissue and second overall, going for immediate airplay at country radio the first week of 2025.

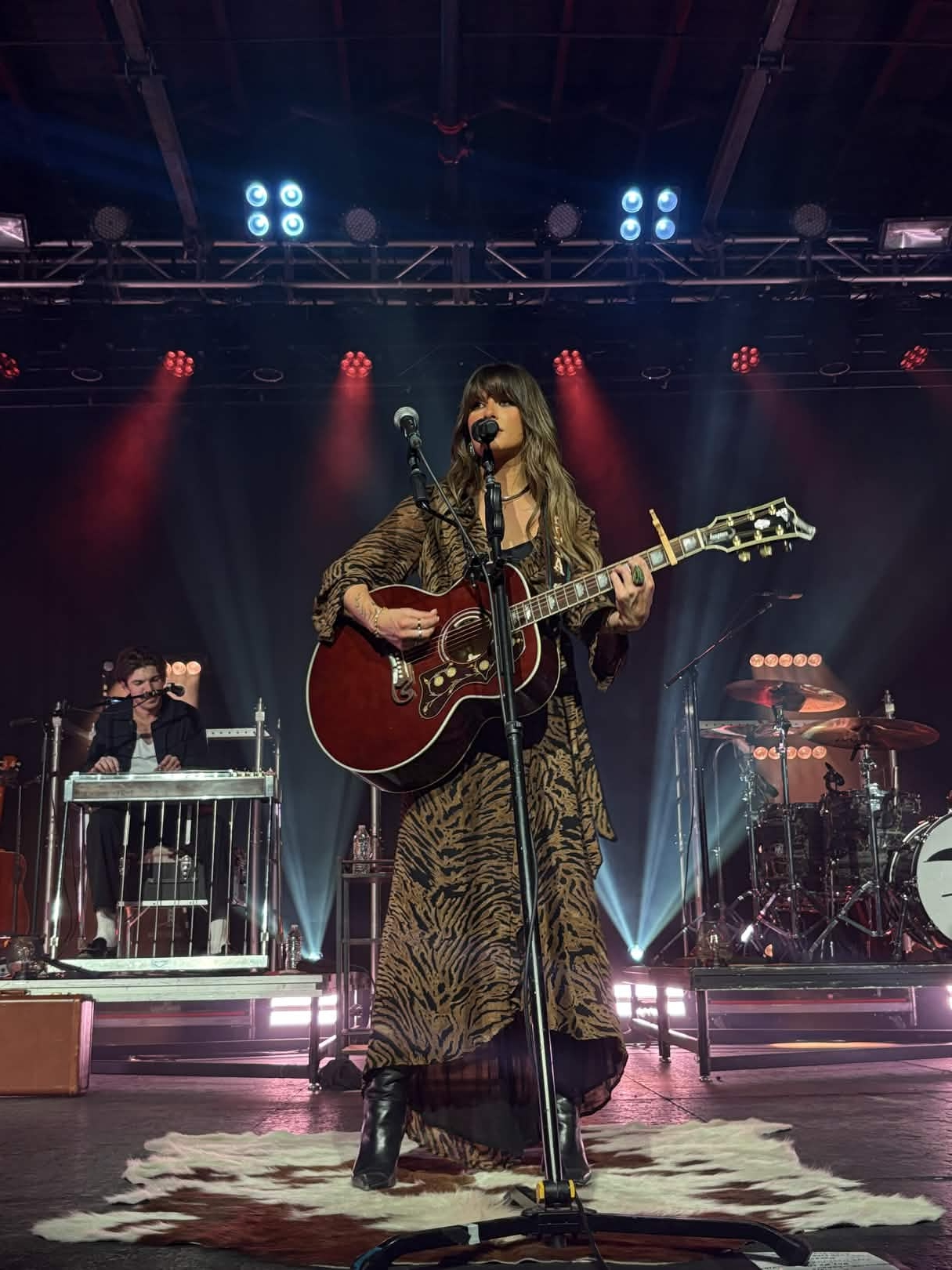
Ella Langley performing in Grand Rapids, Michigan (2025)

== Track listing ==
All tracks are written by Ella Langley, with additional co-writers as noted.

Hungover track listing
No.	Title	Writer(s)	Length
1.	"Hungover"	Josh Kear; Chris Tompkins	3:18
2.	"I Blame the Bar"	Chris LaCorte; Meg McCree; Joybeth Taylor	2:57
3.	"You Look Like You Love Me" (featuring Riley Green)	Riley Green; Aaron Ratiere	3:44
4.	"Nicotine"	Zachary Kale; Jon Nite; Taylor	3:36
5.	"Love You Tonight"	Will Bundy; Lydia Vaughan	2:53
6.	"Better Be Tough"	Bundy; Erik Dylan; Brett James	3:06
7.	"Paint the Town Blue"	Rhett Akins; Bundy; Travis Wood	3:05
8.	"Cowboy Friends"	Austin Goodloe; Taylor; Vaughan	2:58
9.	"Girl Who Drank Wine"	Johnny Clawson; Taylor	3:46
10.	"Monsters"	Taylor; Tristyn Wolkonowski	3:02
11.	"People Change"	Goodloe; Taylor; Laura Veltz	3:22
12.	"Closest to Heaven"	Smith Ahnquist; Clawson	3:10
13.	"Cowgirl Don't Cry" (acoustic)	Jordan Fletcher	3:07
14.	"Broken In" (acoustic)	Ian Christian; Fletcher	2:58
Total length:			45:08

Still Hungover – deluxe edition
No.	Title	Writer(s)	Length
15.	"Girl You're Taking Home"	Kale; Nite; Taylor	3:04
16.	"Weren't for the Wind"	Clawson; Taylor	3:13
17.	"20-20"	Clawson; Kale; Jordan Schmidt	3:15
18.	"Made It Out of Mexico" (acoustic)	Natalie Hemby; Taylor	3:10
19.	"Monologue"	Heather Langley	0:39
Total length:			58:31

Notes

- All vinyl LP editions include "Monologue".

== Tours ==
Date	City	Country	Venue	Opening act
Leg 1 — Hungover (2024)
August 15, 2024	St. Louis	United States	Old Rock House	Kaitlin Butts
August 16, 2024	West Peoria	United States	Crusens	Kaitlin Butts
August 22, 2024	Boston	United States	Brighton Music Hall	Aaron Raitiere
September 6, 2024	Chicago	United States	Joe's Bar	Aaron Raitiere
September 13, 2024	Fort Smith	United States	TempleLive	Meg McRee
October 10, 2024	Chattanooga	United States	The Barrelhouse Ballroom	Meg McRee
October 11, 2024	Birmingham	United States	Zydeco	Meg McRee
October 12, 2024	Jackson	United States	Hub City Brewing	Meg McRee
October 16, 2024	Oxford	United States	Brick Street	Laci Kaye Booth
October 17, 2024	Bloomington	United States	Bluebird Nightclub	Laci Kaye Booth
October 18, 2024	Lexington	United States	The Burl	Laci Kaye Booth
October 31, 2024	Nashville	United States	Exit/In	Mae Estes
November 1, 2024	Nashville	United States	Exit/In	Mae Estes
November 7, 2024	Buda	United States	Maverick's Dance Hall	Laci Kaye Booth
November 8, 2024	Helotes	United States	John T. Floore Country Store	Laci Kaye Booth
Leg 2 — Still Hungover (2025)
January 23, 2025	Oklahoma City	United States	Tower Theatre	Carter Faith
January 24, 2025	Stephenville	United States	Twisted J Live	Carter Faith
January 25, 2025	Nacogdoches	United States	Banita Creek Hall	Carter Faith
January 30, 2025	Kansas City	United States	The Truman	Carter Faith
January 31, 2025	Des Moines	United States	Wooly's	Carter Faith
February 1, 2025	Columbia	United States	The Blue Note	Carter Faith
February 13, 2025	Huntsville	United States	Mars Music Hall	Carter Faith
February 21, 2025	Atlanta	United States	Buckhead Theatre	Carter Faith
February 22, 2025	Columbia	United States	The Senate	Carter Faith
February 27, 2025	Grand Rapids	United States	Elevation @ The Intersection	Carter Faith
February 28, 2025	Springfield	United States	Boondock's	Meg McRee
March 1, 2025	Indianapolis	United States	8 Second Saloon	Taylor Hunnicutt
March 6, 2025	Anderson	United States	Wendell's Dippin Branch	Taylor Hunnicutt
March 7, 2025	Charleston	United States	The Music Farm	Taylor Hunnicutt
April 24, 2025	Milledgeville	United States	Ned Kelly's	Taylor Hunnicutt
April 26, 2025	Charlotte	United States	Neighborhood Theatre	Taylor Hunnicutt
April 30, 2025	Winston-Salem, North Carolina	United States	The Ramkat	Taylor Hunnicutt
Leg 3 — Still Hungover (2025)
August 1, 2025	North Myrtle Beach	United States	House of Blues	Laci Kaye Booth
October 9, 2025	Durant	United States	Choctaw Grand Theater	N/A
October 24, 2025	Athens	United States	Georgia Theatre	Laci Kaye Booth
October 30, 2025	Chattanooga	United States	Soldiers and Sailors Memorial Auditorium	Kaitlin Butts and Gabriella Rose
October 31, 2025	Starkville	United States	Rick’s Cafe Outdoor	Kaitlin Butts and Gabriella Rose
November 6, 2025	Nashville	United States	Ryman Auditorium	N/A
November 7, 2025	Nashville	United States	Ryman Auditorium	N/A

=== Cancelled concerts ===
Date	City	Country	Venue	Reason
February 20, 2025	Winston-Salem, North Carolina	United States	The Ramkat	Unforeseen circumstance

== Charts ==
=== Weekly charts ===
Weekly chart performance for Hungover
Chart (2024–2026)	Peak position
Australian Albums (ARIA)	23
Australian Country Albums (ARIA)	3
Canadian Albums (Billboard)	11
UK Album Downloads (Official Charts)	9
UK Country Albums (Official Charts)	12
US Billboard 200	15
US Top Country Albums (Billboard)	4

=== Year-end charts ===
2024 year-end chart performance for Hungover
Chart (2024)	Position
Australian Country Albums (ARIA)	86
Australian Country Albums (ARIA) Still Hungover	84
US Top Country Albums (Billboard)	70

2025 year-end chart performance for Hungover
Chart (2025)	Position
US Billboard 200	101
US Top Country Albums (Billboard)	17

== Accolades ==
Year-end lists
Publication	Rank	List
Holler	8	The 25 Best Country Albums of 2024
Rolling Stone	20	The 30 Best Country Albums of 2024
Taste of Country	8	The 10 Best Country Albums of 2024

== Certifications ==
Certifications for Hungover
Region	Certification	Certified units/sales
New Zealand (RMNZ)	Gold	7,500^{‡}
United Kingdom (BPI)	Silver	60,000^{‡}
United States (RIAA)	Platinum	1,000,000^{‡}
^{‡} Sales+streaming figures based on certification alone.
