= You Look Like You Love Me =

2024 single by Ella Langley featuring Riley Green

Single by Ella Langley featuring Riley Green

from the album Hungover
- Released: June 21, 2024
- Genre: Country
- Length: 3:44
- Label: Sawgod; Columbia
- Songwriters: Ella Langley; Riley Green; Aaron Raitiere
- Producer: Will Bundy

Ella Langley singles chronology
"Strangers" (2024)	"You Look Like You Love Me" (2024)	"Weren't for the Wind" (2024)

Riley Green singles chronology
"Damn Good Day to Leave" (2024)	"You Look Like You Love Me" (2024)	"Worst Way" (2025)

Music video
- "You Look Like You Love Me" on YouTube

"You Look Like You Love Me" is a song by American country music singer Ella Langley. It was released on June 21, 2024, as a promotional single ahead of her debut studio album, Hungover, before being scheduled for release at country radio on August 5, 2024. It features American country music singer Riley Green and was produced by Will Bundy. The song is Langley's first entry on the Billboard Hot 100, debuting at number 53. It won Musical Event of the Year at the 58th Annual Country Music Association Awards. It is Langley's first and Green's second number one on the Country Airplay chart.

== Background ==
Langley stated in regard to the song, "I'm obsessed with this song, I think it's so fun. I first wrote it with Aaron Ratiere, and then Riley came in and wrote the second verse. It's a cute little love song and hopefully it'll be someone's wedding song one day". In an interview with Holler, Green said the song was "one of those things that can only happen out on the road, out on tour, just really organically. I heard the song, and I think she kinda thought maybe it would be a good collaboration with somebody, so I wrote a second verse for it. It's just a really fun song. She does a great job with it, and it's definitely something that I'm sure we'll be doing together".

Langley teased the song on May 13, 2024, through two clips on social media. She and Green also shared snippets of the song on TikTok and performed it during their joint tour.

== Composition ==
The song combines pedal steel guitar with drums in the instrumental and consists of two verses performed in spoken word. In the first verse, Langley's character recounts being lonely during a night in the bar at 22 years old, until falling in love with a cowboy upon spotting him dancing. She walks up to the man, hands him a beer and confesses her love for him, which is depicted in the sung chorus. The second verse finds Green speaking from the man's point of view, in which he returns her affection. The two then sing the next chorus together.

== Critical reception ==
Maxim Mower of Holler called the song a "beautifully retro duet", writing "Ella Langley's infuses plenty of swagger and charisma into her vocals, which carry the majority of the track, before Riley Green enters the fray to reciprocate her advances" and "Riley's gruff, rugged delivery and the gravitas he brings create the perfect balance with Ella's voice, with the two lacing 'You Look Like You Love Me' with the chemistry needed to make this a convincing, simmering collaboration that oozes sexual tension". Casey Young of Whiskey Riff stated, "Hearing a song written from the woman's perspective when it comes to making the first move is definitely different, especially in the country genre, and I love Ella's fresh take on dating and what's typically 'acceptable'". He also commented, "And obviously, having Riley on it adds such a fun layer in terms of making it a duet, and like I said, I can already see this being a big hit among both of their fan bases. It's already one of my favorite singles released this year, and I'll have it on repeat for the foreseeable future". Taste of Country placed it at number six on its list of the Top 40 Country Songs of 2024.

== Music video ==
The music video for "You Look Like You Love Me" was directed by Wales Toney, John Park, and Ella Langley, and premiered on August 28, 2024. Featuring a Wild West motif, the video takes place in a saloon where Langley's character is the featured entertainer, catching the eye of Riley Green's character, an outlaw whose face appears on wanted posters, when he walks in. The two dance together among other bar patrons until the town sheriff comes in with his pistol drawn, though the duo remains unfazed and Langley takes a turn dancing with the sheriff, before the clip ends with them riding away on horseback. The video features cameo appearances by Jamey Johnson and Green's dog, Carl.

== Accolades ==
Awards and nominations for "You Look Like You Love Me"
Organization	Year	Category	Result
People's Choice Country Awards	2024	The Collaboration Song of 2024	Nominated
Country Music Association Awards	2024	Musical Event of the Year	Won
Academy of Country Music Awards	2025	Single of the Year	Won
Academy of Country Music Awards	2025	Song of the Year	Nominated
Academy of Country Music Awards	2025	Visual Media of the Year	Won
Academy of Country Music Awards	2025	Music Event of the Year	Won
Country Music Association Awards	2025	Video of the Year	Won

== Charts ==
=== Weekly charts ===
Weekly chart performance for "You Look Like You Love Me"
Chart (2024–2025)	Peak position
Australia (ARIA)	67
Australia Country Hot 50 (The Music)	1
Canada Hot 100 (Billboard)	31
Canada Country (Billboard)	1
Global 200 (Billboard)	89
Ireland (IRMA)	66
New Zealand (Recorded Music NZ)	19
UK Singles (Official Charts)	59
US Billboard Hot 100	30
US Country Airplay (Billboard)	1
US Hot Country Songs (Billboard)	7

=== Year-end charts ===
2024 year-end chart performance for "You Look Like You Love Me"
Chart (2024)	Position
Canada (Canadian Hot 100)	93
US Hot Country Songs (Billboard)	36

2025 year-end chart performance for "You Look Like You Love Me"
Chart (2025)	Position
US Country Airplay (Billboard)	60
US Hot Country Songs (Billboard)	54

== Certifications ==
Certifications for "You Look Like You Love Me"
Region	Certification	Certified units/sales
Australia (ARIA)	2× Platinum	140,000^{‡}
Canada (Music Canada)	3× Platinum	240,000^{‡}
New Zealand (RMNZ)	2× Platinum	60,000^{‡}
United Kingdom (BPI)	Gold	400,000^{‡}
United States (RIAA)	4× Platinum	4,000,000^{‡}
^{‡} Sales+streaming figures based on certification alone.
