= Jimmy Harnen =

American singer (born 1963)

- Born: March 25, 1963 (age 62); Plymouth, Pennsylvania, U.S.
- Origin: Wilkes-Barre, Pennsylvania, U.S.
- Genres: Rock
- Occupations: Singer-songwriter, drummer, record label executive
- Years active: 1985–1991
- Labels: Columbia

Jimmy Harnen is an American singer, songwriter, drummer, and music industry executive. He had a top ten U.S. hit in 1989 with the power ballad "Where Are You Now", credited to Jimmy Harnen with Synch (/sɪntʃ/), or solely to Jimmy Harnen in other territories.

== Biography ==
Harnen was born and raised in Plymouth, a small town in northeast Pennsylvania. In high school, he played drums in the marching band. In 1985, he became the drummer for the local band Synch, made up of lead vocalist Lou Butwin, guitarist Dave Abraham, bass guitarist James A. Donnelly and keyboard player Chuck Yarmey.

That year, the band recorded some of their songs, with Harnen singing on one song, "Where Are You Now". He had written the song with a friend named Rich Congdon, and the band decided to release it as a single on the independent label Micki Records, originally backed with the Butwin-sung B-side, "End the Game".

After receiving local airplay in the Wilkes-Barre market, Synch was signed by Columbia Records and "Where Are You Now" was re-recorded at The Warehouse in Philadelphia with the former Dakota members Bill Kelly and Jerry Hludzik producing and Dave Abraham playing guitar. The band released the album ...Get the Feelin' in 1986, and "Where Are You Now" reached #77 on the Billboard Hot 100, staying on the chart for two and half months. ...Get the Feelin' also included the local single, "Give Love Another Try", but it did not crack the charts. Synch was soon dropped by Columbia. They spent the next few years trying to recapture the spotlight, before disbanding, at which point Jimmy finally got his hair cut.

In the interim, one Richmond VA radio station (WLZR 92.9 FM) was still getting requests for the song, which was a consistent top performer during the nightly local request countdown after its 1986 release. WLZR-FM night DJ Kidd Crockett (later known as Kid Kelly of Z-100 New York and current DJ on Sirius XM 'Hits' channel) continued to play the song even after national airplay had dwindled. A part-time DJ at the station, JJ Wright, had always liked the song and kept a promo single of the record for his personal use. In 1988, Kidd Crockett and JJ Wright reunited in Buffalo NY at WKSE-FM. Shortly after, when another resurgent single, "Into the Night" by Benny Mardones became a national hit again, JJ dug up his promo 45 and presented it to Kiss 98.5 Program Director, Paul 'Boom Boom' Cannon, who in turn played it for his national music consultant who in turn submitted it to many of his Top 40 and Adult Contemporary radio stations where the domino effect caused a massive revival for the single. In 1989, "Where Are You Now" had now successfully resurfaced and began receiving a tremendous amount of airplay nationwide, with the song now credited as 'Jimmy Harnen with Synch'. WTG, a new label at the time, signed Harnen and while the song was climbing the charts he began recording a full-length release for the label. This time, the song peaked at #10 on the Billboard Hot 100 and at #3 on the Adult Contemporary chart.

Harnen's first album, Can't Fight the Midnight, co-written by local hometown natives, P.J. Williams, and Tommy Owens, the album also featured well-known studio musicians including future American Idol judge Randy Jackson (bass guitar), Toto's Steve Lukather (guitar) and a guest appearance by one of Harnen's idols, REO Speedwagon's Kevin Cronin and Synch/Dakota guitar player Jon Lorance. The album and tour flopped and Harnen spent the next couple of years releasing occasional songs and tapes until his move to Nashville, Tennessee.

There, he worked as the national promotional director for DreamWorks Records, and with management at Refugee Records. In early October 2006, Harnen rose from vice president of national promotion to senior vice president of promotion for Capitol Records.

In April 2009, Harnen left Capitol and joined Scott Borchetta, the founder of Big Machine Records (label for artists such as Taylor Swift), becoming president of the new label, Republic Nashville. Artists on the label include Florida Georgia Line, whose single "Cruise" was the most digitally downloaded single in the history of country music, Cassadee Pope, A Thousand Horses, Brett Young, and Ryan Follese.

In 2023, Harnen was inducted into the Luzerne County Arts & Entertainment Hall of Fame. He was inducted as a member of the Hall of Fame's inaugural class.

== Discography ==
=== Synch ===
==== Album ====
- 1986: ...Get the Feelin'

==== Singles ====
- 1985: "Give Love Another Try"
- 1986: "Where Are You Now" - US #77
- 1987: "Should Have Said No"

=== Solo ===
==== Album ====
- 1989: Can't Fight the Midnight

==== Singles ====
- 1988: "You're All I Know"
- 1989: "No Reason in the World"
- 1989: "Where Are You Now" - US #10, US AC #3
