= Riley Green =

American singer-songwriter (born 1988)

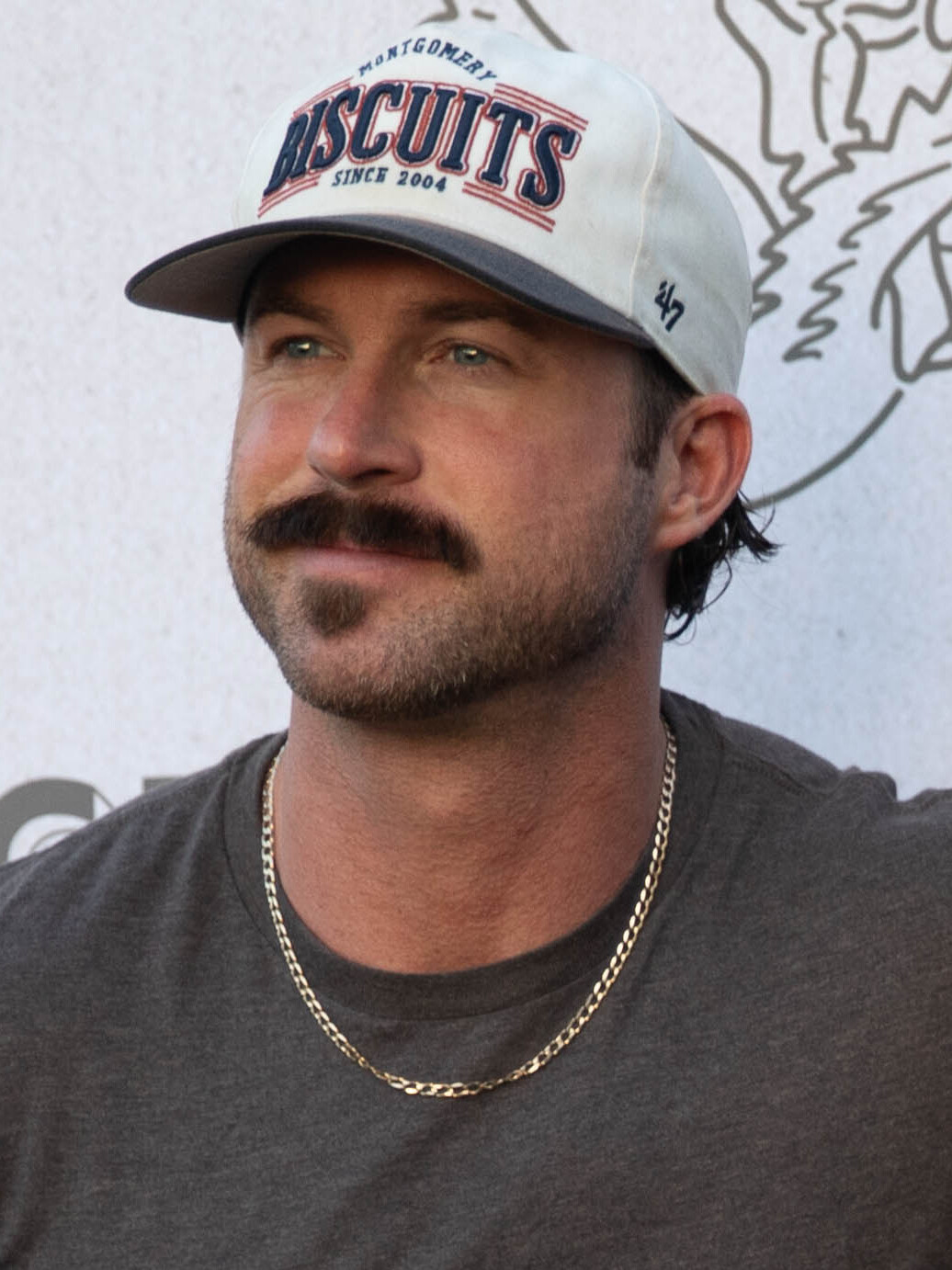
- Green at Fort Stewart in Georgia, June 2024

Background information
- Born: Johnathan Riley Green; October 18, 1988 (age 38); Jacksonville, Alabama, U.S.
- Genre: Country
- Occupation: Singer-songwriter
- Instruments: Vocals; guitar
- Years active: 2013–present
- Label: Nashville Harbor
- Website: rileygreenmusic.com

Johnathan Riley Green (born October 18, 1988) is an American country music singer-songwriter. He has been with Nashville Harbor Records & Entertainment formerly BMLG (Big Machine Label Group) since 2018 and has released four albums: Different 'Round Here in 2019, Ain't My Last Rodeo in 2023, Don't Mind If I Do in 2024, and That's Just Me in 2026. His debut and third albums have been certified Gold by the Recording Industry Association of America. During his career, he has had multiple Top 20 hits on the Billboard Hot Country Songs and Country Airplay charts.

== Background ==
Johnathan Riley Green was born on October 18, 1988 in Jacksonville, Alabama. He learned to play music from his grandfather, Buford Green, who ran a venue (The Golden Saw). Riley performed weekly at the music hall, a converted sawmill, at the time. While at Jacksonville State University in Jacksonville, he was a quarterback for the Gamecocks NCAA Division I football team. He was also a contestant on the CMT reality show Redneck Island.

== Career ==
=== 2013–2018: Beginning of his career ===
Riley Green released a self-titled EP in 2013, followed by EPs in 2015, 2016, and 2017. In 2018, he signed to the Big Machine Label Group. His debut single, "There Was This Girl", was released on August 6, 2018. Billy Dukes of Taste of Country reviewed "There Was This Girl" favorably, comparing its theme to "Chicks Dig It" by Chris Cagle and noting a more neotraditional country influence in the music compared to Green's peers. The song achieved commercial success and was on several country music charts including No. 1 on Country Airplay in April 2019.

=== 2019–2023: Different 'Round Here and Ain't My Last Rodeo ===
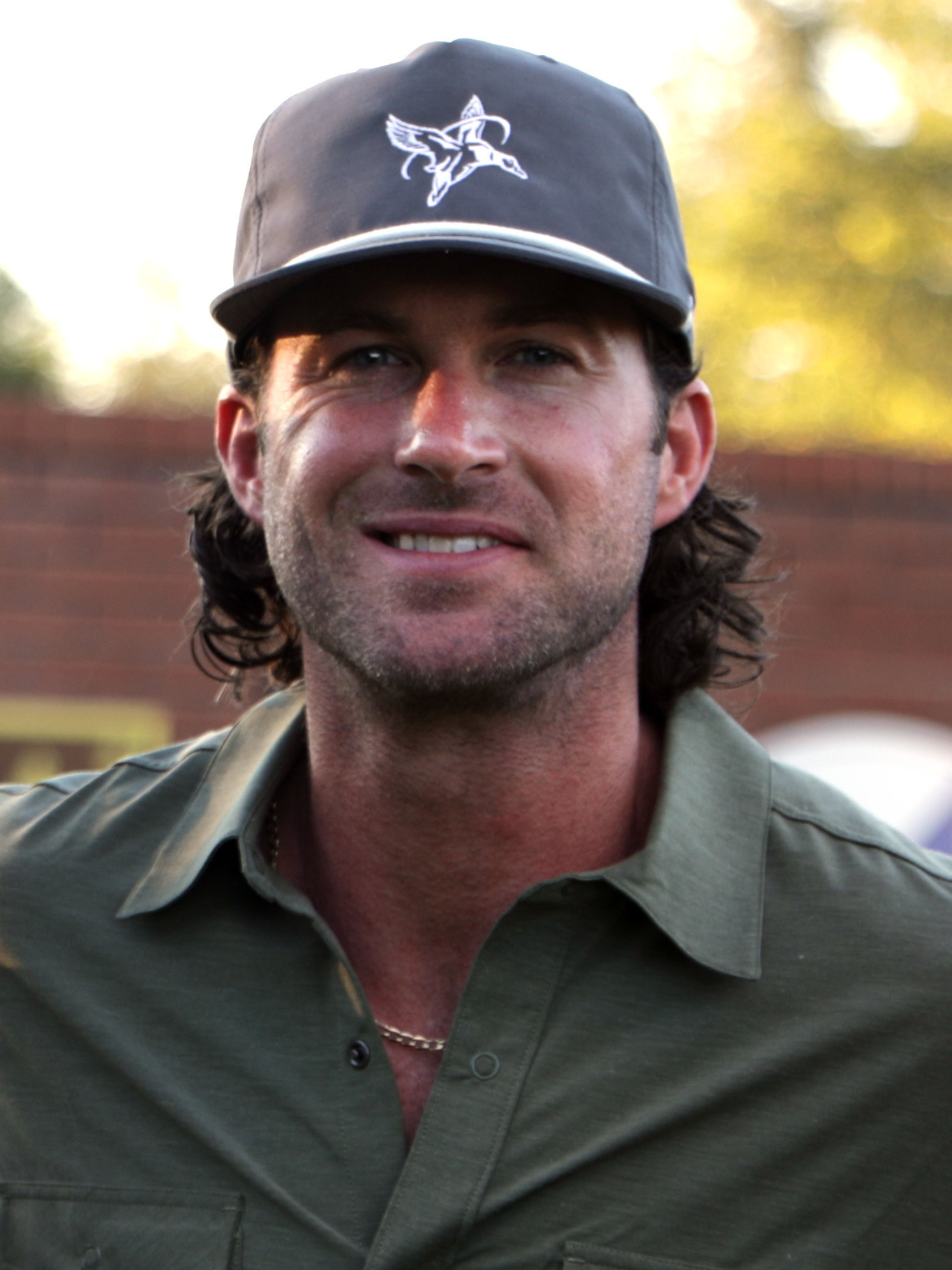
Green at Fort Rucker in Alabama, August 2022

In April 2019, Green announced the release of his second single, "In Love by Now", co-written with Rhett Akins, Ben Hayslip, and Marv Green; Riley released an accompanying music video shot in Belize. "I Wish Grandpas Never Died" was released in August 2019 as the third single from Riley Green's debut album, Different 'Round Here, which came out on September 20, 2019. The Academy of Country Music presented Green with the New Male Artist of the Year Award for 2019. In 2022 and 2023, he served as direct support (opening act) on major stadium tours for Luke Combs and Morgan Wallen. He collaborated on a song with Justin Moore for Moore's 2023 album Stray Dog. On October 13, 2023, Green released his second studio album, Ain't My Last Rodeo. The album featured a re-recorded version of "Different 'Round Here" as a duet with Combs.

=== 2024–present: Don't Mind If I Do, That's Just Me, and television roles ===
Green released his third studio album, Don't Mind If I Do, on October 18, 2024. The album's title track is a duet with Ella Langley. In April 2026, it was reported that he would portray Garrett Garvey, Cal's and Kayce's former Navy SEAL teammate in a 4-episode arc on Marshals, making his acting debut on April 19, 2026. Green's Cowboy As It Gets Tour began in April 2026 and concluded in August 2026. In May 2026, he was nominated for Best Male Country Artist at the 2026 American Music Awards. His fourth studio album, That's Just Me, was released on September 18, 2026. Two of the singles from the album, "My Way" and "Think as You Drunk", were released in April and May of 2026, respectively. In late 2026, he debuted as a coach on the 30th season of the reality television series The Voice. Green performed the halftime show at the 113th Grey Cup in Calgary, Alberta on November 15, 2026.

== Personal life ==
Green lives near his hometown of Jacksonville, Alabama, and his hobbies include hunting and fishing. He is noted for having a passion for duck hunting and was branded "Riley Duckman" by friends in Alabama. Green has since embraced the nickname in multiple aspects of his career.

== Controversies ==
In late 2019, Green drew controversy for a line in his song "Bury Me in Dixie" which referenced Confederate general Robert E. Lee. Green removed the song from streaming services in October 2019. He denied any racial motive for referencing Lee, saying the lyric was an expression of "pride and heritage in what I grew up around". He said that avoiding controversy was not the motive for removing the song from streaming services, citing concerns about poor audio quality instead. The song returned to streaming services a few months after the controversy.

== Discography ==
Studio albums

- Different 'Round Here (2019)
- Ain't My Last Rodeo (2023)
- Don't Mind If I Do (2024)
- That's Just Me (2026)

== Tours ==
=== Headlining ===
- Outlaws Like Us Tour (2018)
- Get That Man a Beer Tour (2019)
- We Out Here Tour (2021–22)
- Ain't My Last Rodeo Tour (2024)
- Damn Country Music Tour (2025) (with Ella Langley)
- Cowboy As It Gets Tour (2026)
- That's Just Me Tour (2027)

=== Opening ===
- 2019 Heartache Medication Tour (Jon Pardi) (2019)
- 2019 World Tour (Brad Paisley) (2019)
- We Back Tour (Jason Aldean) (2020)
- Beers on Me Tour (Dierks Bentley) (2021)
- Raised Up Right Tour (Luke Bryan) (2022)
- Luke Bryan Farm Tour 2022 (Luke Bryan) (2022)
- Luke Combs Canadian Tour (Luke Combs) (2022)
- Luke Combs World Tour (Luke Combs) (2023)

== Awards and nominations ==
=== American Music Awards ===
Year	Nominee / work	Award	Result
2026	Riley Green	Best Male Country Artist	Nominated

=== Academy of Country Music Awards ===
Year	Nominee / work	Award	Result
2020	Riley Green	Top New Male Vocalist	Won
2024	"Different 'Round Here" (featuring Luke Combs)	Music Event of the Year	Nominated
2025	"You Look Like You Love Me" (featuring Ella Langley)	Music Event of the Year	Won
2025	"You Look Like You Love Me" (featuring Ella Langley)	Visual Media of the Year	Won
2025	"You Look Like You Love Me" (featuring Ella Langley)	Song of the Year	Nominated
2025	"You Look Like You Love Me" (featuring Ella Langley)	Single of the Year	Won
2026	"Don't Mind If I Do" (featuring Ella Langley)	Music Event of the Year	Won
2026	Don't Mind If I Do	Album of the Year	Nominated
2026	Riley Green	Male Artist of the Year	Nominated
2026	Riley Green	Artist-Songwriter of the Year	Nominated

=== Country Music Association Awards ===
Year	Nominee / work	Award	Result
2024	"You Look Like You Love Me" (featuring Ella Langley)	Musical Event of the Year	Won
2025	"Don't Mind If I Do" (featuring Ella Langley)	Musical Event of the Year	Nominated
2025	"You Look Like You Love Me" (featuring Ella Langley)	Single of the Year	Won
2025	"You Look Like You Love Me" (featuring Ella Langley)	Song of the Year	Won
2025	"You Look Like You Love Me" (featuring Ella Langley)	Music Video of the Year	Won
