= UK Country Airplay =

Airplay chart

The UK Country Airplay chart is a weekly music chart based on the radio airplay of country music singles on radio stations in the United Kingdom. It serves as the UK equivalent to the American Billboard Country Airplay chart.

Announced on 8 March 2024, the debut chart was revealed a few days later on 10 March to coincide with the final day of the 2024 C2C: Country to Country music festival, with the official top 40 being posted each week on the UK-based country publication Countrymusic.co.uk. The chart, which is the first genre-specific radio chart in the UK, aims to serve as a key measure of which songs are being enjoyed most frequently by listeners across the country and is produced in collaboration with music company Radiomonitor, and the UK branch of the Country Music Association.

The first number one song on the UK Country Airplay chart was "Creek Will Rise" by Conner Smith. The current number one single is "Can't Sit Still" by Lainey Wilson.

== Background ==
The creation of the chart was spearheaded by the increase in popularity of country music within the UK and was described by Milly Olykan, vice president of international relations and development for the CMA, as a "pivotal initiative in a move towards more mainstream moments for the genre" and noting how the consumption of country music in the UK increased by 40% in 2023. In a statement following the announcement of the chart, Olkyan explained "This is an incredibly exciting time for country music in the UK. From the genre experiencing a 40% growth in consumption throughout the last year, to the volume of tickets sold to Country festivals and tours increasing at a record pace, it's apparent the Country is broadening significantly into the mainstream in the UK. This new radio chart will provide another exposure opportunity to further elevate Country artists and allow for greater engagement with fans. As the premier trade association supporting the growth of the Country Music industry, CMA's focus in the UK is to continue to identify how we can move towards more mainstream moments for the genre, and this is another pivotal initiative."

Alexa Hannaby, head of Big Machine Records in the UK and leader of the project, stated "I'm thrilled for the launch of the UK Country Radio Airplay Chart, a significant milestone for Country music in the UK. This achievement is truly a testament to the incredible teamwork and collaboration between industry experts and Radiomonitor. Together, we're paving the way for increased recognition and exposure for country artists in the UK and I'm excited to see its impact unfold.

=== First top 10 ===
The first ever top 10 was revealed on 10 March 2024:

1. "Creek Will Rise" – Conner Smith
2. "The Painter" – Cody Johnson
3. "Pretty Little Poison" – Warren Zeiders
4. "Tucson Too Late" – Jordan Davis
5. "Your Place" – Ashley Cooke
6. "I Can Feel It" – Kane Brown
7. "Burn It Down" – Parker McCollum
8. "Wildflowers and Wild Horses" – Lainey Wilson
9. "Where It Ends" – Bailey Zimmerman
10. "23" – Chayce Beckham

== Eligibility ==
Each weekly iteration of the chart will consist of the Top 50 songs being heard on the radio, taken from a pool of new releases, with anything that was made available more than three years ago discounted. This will help to ensure the chart is an accurate reflection of current trends and interests within the genre. Data is compiled from a plethora of UK country radio stations, including Absolute Radio Country, BBC Radio 2 - The Country Show with Bob Harris, CountryLine: The Big 615, Downtown Country Radio, and Smooth Country Radio.

== Number ones ==
Key
No.	nth singe to top the UK Country Airplay chart
re	Return of a single to number one

No.	Artist	Song	Record label	Reached number one	Weeks at number one	Ref.
1	Conner Smith	"Creek Will Rise"	Valory Music Co.	11 March 2024	1	
2	Cody Johnson	"The Painter"	Mercury Nashville	17 March 2024	1	
re	Conner Smith	"Creek Will Rise"	Valory Music Co.	24 March 2024	2	
3	Jordan Davis	"Tucson Too Late"	MCA Nashville	7 April 2024	1	
4	Parker McCollum	"Burn It Down"	MCA Nashville	14 April 2024	1	
5	Dasha	"Austin"	Warner Records	21 April 2024	1	
6	Sam Hunt	"Outskirts"	MCA Nashville	28 April 2024	1	
7	Ashley Cooke	"Your Place"	Big Loud	5 May 2024	1	
re	Sam Hunt	"Outskirts"	MCA Nashville	12 May 2024	1	
re	Ashley Cooke	"Your Place"	Big Loud	19 May 2024	1	
8	Post Malone featuring Morgan Wallen	"I Had Some Help"	Republic Nashville/Mercury Nashville	26 May 2024	1	
re	Ashley Cooke	"Your Place"	Big Loud	2 June 2024	2	
re	Post Malone featuring Morgan Wallen	"I Had Some Help"	Republic Nashville/Mercury Nashville	16 June 2024	1	
9	Nate Smith	"Bulletproof"	RCA Nashville	23 June 2024	1	
10	Thomas Rhett	"Beautiful as You"	Big Machine	30 June 2024	2	
11	Post Malone featuring Blake Shelton	"Pour Me a Drink"	Republic Nashville/Mercury Nashville	14 July 2024	1	
12	Ella Langley featuring Riley Green	"You Look Like You Love Me"	SAWGOD/Columbia Records	21 July 2024	1	
13	Lainey Wilson	"Hang Tight Honey"	BBR Music Group	28 July 2024	3	
14	Shaboozey	"A Bar Song (Tipsy)"	American Dogwood/Magnolia/Empire/Republic	18 August 2024	1	
15	Luke Combs	"Ain't No Love in Oklahoma"	Columbia/Atlantic	25 August 2024	1	
re	Thomas Rhett	"Beautiful as You"	Big Machine	1 September 2024	1	
16	Drew Baldridge	"She's Somebody's Daughter"	Lyric Ridge	8 September 2024	2	
17	Keith Urban	"Wildside"	Hit Red/Capitol Nashville	22 September 2024	4	
18	Kelsea Ballerini and Noah Kahan	"Cowboys Cry Too"	Black River	20 October 2024	1	
19	Morgan Wallen	"Love Somebody"	Big Loud/Republic/Mercury	27 October 2024	1	
20	Jordan Davis	"I Ain't Sayin'"	MCA Nashville	3 November 2024	1	
re	Shaboozey	"A Bar Song (Tipsy)"	American Dogwood/Magnolia/Empire/Republic	10 November 2024	1	
re	Jordan Davis	"I Ain't Sayin'"	MCA Nashville	17 November 2024	1	
21	Lainey Wilson	"4x4xU"	BBR Music Group	24 November 2024	2	
re	Jordan Davis	"I Ain't Sayin'"	MCA Nashville	8 December 2024	4	
22	Cody Johnson and Carrie Underwood	"I'm Gonna Love You"	Warner Music Nashville	5 January 2025	1	
re	Jordan Davis	"I Ain't Sayin'"	MCA Nashville	12 January 2025	2	
23	Tucker Wetmore	Wind Up Missin' You	EMI Nashville	26 January 2025	1	
24	Blake Shelton	"Texas"	Ten Point/Wheelhouse	2 February 2025	3	
25	Drew Baldridge	"Tough People"	Stoney Creek	23 February 2025	1	
re	Blake Shelton	"Texas"	Ten Point/Wheelhouse	2 March 2025	5	
26	Eric Church	"Hands of Time"	EMI Nashville	6 April 2025	1	
27	Riley Green	"Worst Way"	Nashville Harbor	13 April 2025	1	
28	Dasha	"Not at This Party"	Warner Records	20 April 2025	1	
29	Ella Langley	"Weren't for the Wind"	Sawgod/Columbia Records	27 April 2025	2	
re	Eric Church	"Hands of Time"	EMI Nashville	11 May 2025	1	
re	Ella Langley	"Weren't for the Wind"	Sawgod/Columbia Records	18 May 2025	2	
30	Tucker Wetmore	"3,2,1"	Back Blocks/UMG Nashville	1 June 2025	1	
31	Lainey Wilson	"Somewhere Over Laredo"	BBR	8 June 2025	1	
re	Eric Church	"Hands of Time"	EMI Nashville	15 June 2025	1	
32	Bailey Zimmerman and Luke Combs	"Backup Plan"	Atlantic Records/Warner Nashville	22 June 2025	2	
33	Russell Dickerson	"Happen to Me"	Triple Tigers	6 July 2025	1	
re	Bailey Zimmerman and Luke Combs	"Backup Plan"	Atlantic Records/Warner Nashville	13 July 2025	5	
re	Russell Dickerson	"Happen to Me"	Triple Tigers	17 August 2025	2	
34	Jelly Roll	"Heart of Stone"	Stoney Creek	31 August 2025	2	
35	Riley Green	"Change My Mind"	Nashville Harbor	14 September 2025	1	
re	Jelly Roll	"Heart of Stone"	Stoney Creek	21 September 2025	1	
re	Russell Dickerson	"Happen to Me"	Triple Tigers	28 September 2025	1	
36	Ella Langley featuring Hardy	"Never Met Anyone Like You"	Sawgod/Columbia	5 October 2025	1	
37	Cody Johnson	"The Fall"	Warner Music Nashville	12 October 2025	3	
38	Megan Moroney	"6 Months Later"	Sony	2 November 2025	1	
39	Josh Ross	"Hate How You Look"	The Core/Universal Canada/Mercury Nashville	9 November 2025	1	
40	Ella Langley	"Choosin' Texas"	Sawgod/Columbia Records	16 November 2025	3	
41	Thomas Rhett featuring Niall Horan	"Old Tricks"	Valory	8 December 2025	1	
re	Ella Langley	"Choosin' Texas"	Sawgod/Columbia Records	15 December 2025	9	
42	Tucker Wetmore	"Brunette"	Black Blocks	15 February 2026	3	
43	Morgan Wallen	"20 Cigarettes"	Big Loud/Republic Records/Mercury Records	8 March 2026	2	
44	Luke Combs	"Sleepless in a Hotel Room"	Seven Ridges/Sony	22 March 2026	1	
re	Ella Langley	"Choosin' Texas"	Sawgod/Columbia Records	29 March 2026	1	
re	Tucker Wetmore	"Brunette"	Black Blocks	5 April 2026	1	
45	The Shires	"Getaway Car"	Big Machine Records	12 April 2026	1	
46	Jon Pardi	"Boots Off"	Capitol Nashville	19 April 2026	1	
47	Lainey Wilson	"Can't Sit Still"	This Is Hit/BBR	19 April 2026	1	
Re	Jon Pardi	"Boots Off"	Capitol Nashville	3 May 2026	1	
Re	Lainey Wilson	"Can't Sit Still"	This Is Hit/BBR	10 May 2026	2	
48	Stella Lefty	"Boston"	Netflix Music	24 May 2026	7	

== Artist milestones ==
=== Most number one songs ===
Number ones	Artist	Songs (Weeks at number one)
4	Ella Langley	"You Look Like You Love Me" (1), "Weren't for the Wind" (4), "Never Met Anyone Like You" (1), "Choosin' Texas" (13)
4	Lainey Wilson	"Hang Tight Honey" (3), "4x4xU" (2), "Somewhere Over Laredo" (1), "Can't Sit Still" (3)
3	Cody Johnson	"The Painter" (1), "I'm Gonna Love You" (1), "The Fall" (3)
3	Luke Combs	"Ain't No Love in Oklahoma" (1), "Backup Plan" (7), "Sleepless in a Hotel Room" (1)
3	Morgan Wallen	"I Had Some Help" (2), "Love Somebody", (1), "20 Cigarettes" (2)
3	Riley Green	"You Look Like You Love Me" (1), "Worst Way" (1), "Change My Mind" (1)
3	Tucker Wetmore	"Wind Up Missin' You" (1), "3, 2, 1" (1), "Brunette" (4)

=== Most cumulative weeks at number one ===
Weeks at number one	Artist
19	Ella Langley
9	Blake Shelton
9	Jordan Davis
9	Lainey Wilson
9	Luke Combs
7	Bailey Zimmerman
7	Stella Lefty
6	Tucker Wetmore
5	Cody Johnson
5	Morgan Wallen
4	Ashley Cooke
4	Cody Johnson
4	Keith Urban
4	Russell Dickerson
4	Thomas Rhett

== Song milestones ==
=== Most weeks at number one ===
Weeks at number one	Song	Artist
13	"Choosin' Texas"	Ella Langley
9	"Backup Plan"	Bailey Zimmerman feat. Luke Combs
8	"Texas"	Blake Shelton
7	"Boston"	Stella Lefty
