= 2024 People's Choice Country Awards =

Annual award in Tennessee, US

- Date: September 26, 2024
- Location: Grand Ole Opry, Nashville, Tennessee
- Hosted by: Shania Twain

Highlights
- Most wins: Morgan Wallen (4)
- Most nominations: Zach Bryan (19)

Television/radio coverage
- Network: NBC, Peacock
- Viewership: 3.3 million

The 2024 People's Choice Country Awards, the second ceremony, was held on Thursday, September 26, 2024 at the Grand Ole Opry in Nashville, Tennessee. It was hosted by country pop star Shania Twain. The ceremony was broadcast live on NBC and was made available to stream on Peacock. Zach Bryan led the nominations with nineteen nods, followed by Beyoncé with seventeen, and Kacey Musgraves with fifteen.

The People's Choice Country Awards recognize "the biggest and best that country music has to offer" chosen entirely by the fans across various categories. Several honorary awards will also be bestowed during the awards ceremony.

== Background ==
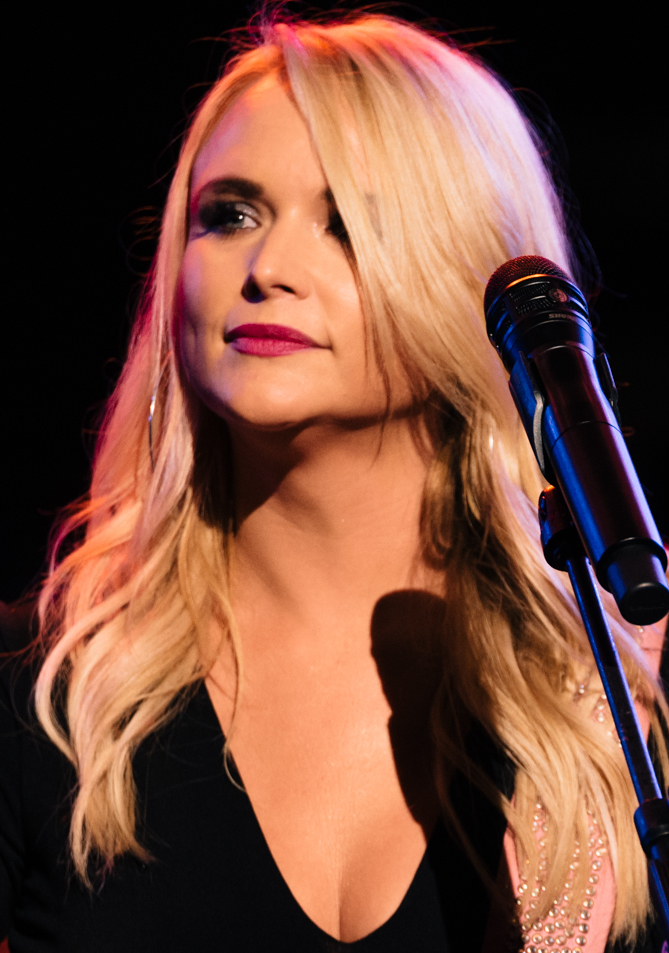
Miranda Lambert, who received the Country Icon award.

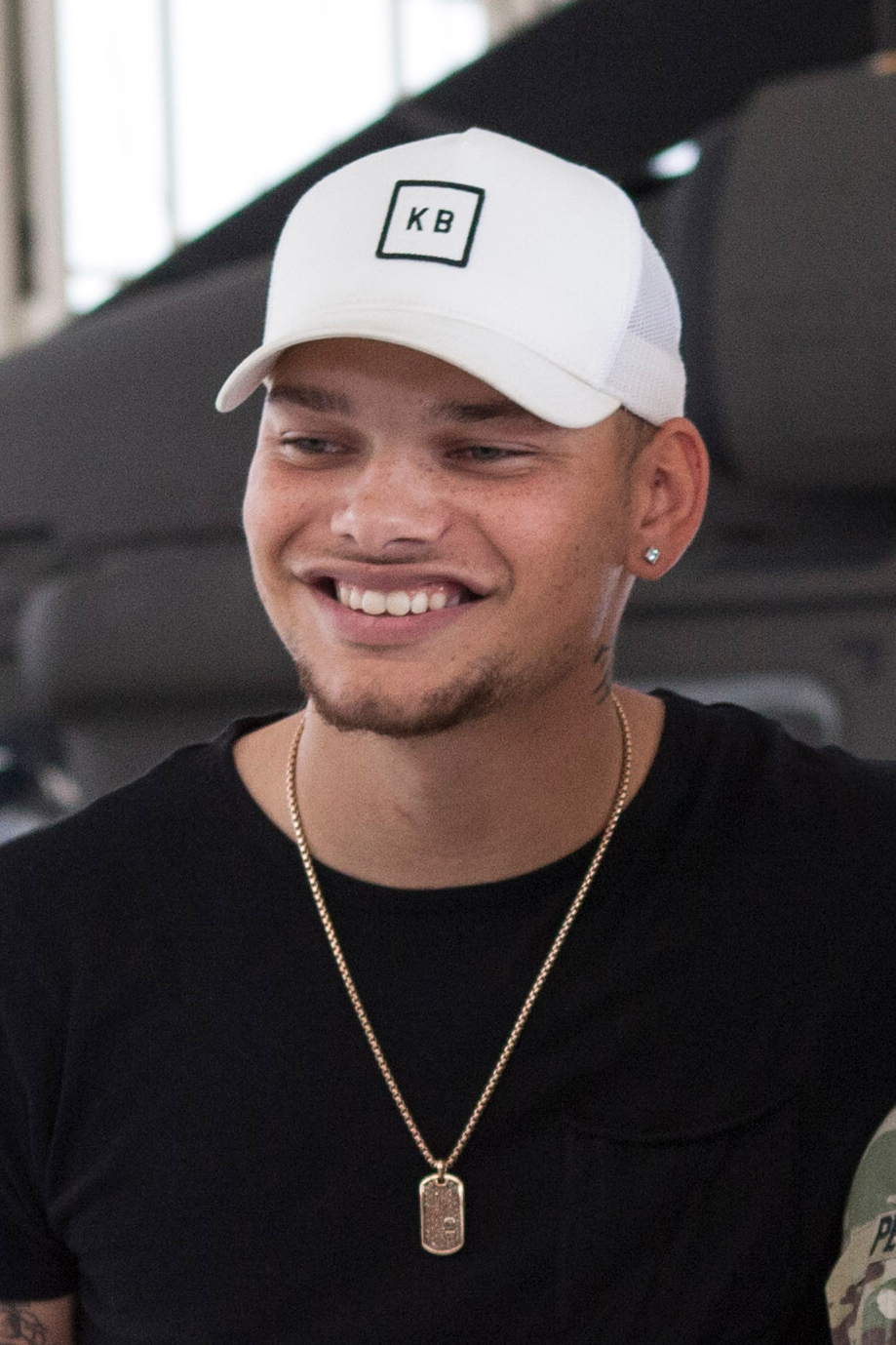
Kane Brown, who received the Country Champion award.

Following the 2023 ceremony NBCUniversal announced the ceremony would return for a second ceremony the following year. Voting begins Wednesday, August 14. The ceremony added six more categories for Female Song, Male Song, Group/Duo Song, Cover Song, New Artist Song and Storyteller Song.

On August 22, Miranda Lambert was announced as the recipient of the Country Icon Award, "We're so excited to celebrate her career, fierce individualism and innovation in the industry with the Country Icon Award," said NBCUniversal.

On September 6, Kane Brown was announced as the recipient of the Country Champion Award.

== Nominees ==
The nominees were announced on August 14, 2024 and the winners are listed in bold.

The People's Artist of 2024	The Album of 2024
**Morgan Wallen**; Beyoncé; Jelly Roll; Kacey Musgraves; Kane Brown; Lainey Wilson; Luke Combs; Zach Bryan	**Fathers & Sons – Luke Combs**; Cowboy Carter — Beyoncé; Deeper Well — Kacey Musgraves; Higher — Chris Stapleton; Highway Desperado — Jason Aldean; Leather — Cody Johnson; Where I've Been, Isn't Where I'm Going — Shaboozey; Zach Bryan — Zach Bryan
The Female Artist of 2024	The Male Artist of 2024
**Lainey Wilson**; Beyoncé; Carly Pearce; Dolly Parton; Kacey Musgraves; Kelsea Ballerini; Megan Moroney; Miranda Lambert	**Luke Combs**; Bailey Zimmerman; Chris Stapleton; Cody Johnson; Jelly Roll; Kane Brown; Morgan Wallen; Zach Bryan
The Group/Duo of 2024	The New Artist of 2024
**Dan + Shay**; Brothers Osborne; Old Dominion; Ole 60; The Red Clay Strays; The War and Treaty; Tigirlily Gold; Zac Brown Band	**Shaboozey**; Chase Matthew; Chayce Beckham; Dasha; Koe Wetzel; Nate Smith; Tucker Wetmore; Warren Zeiders
The Song of 2024	The Female Song of 2024
**"I Had Some Help" – Post Malone feat. Morgan Wallen**; “A Bar Song (Tipsy)” — Shaboozey; “Austin (Boots Stop Workin')” — Dasha; “I Remember Everything” — Zach Bryan feat. Kacey Musgraves; “Miles on It” — Marshmello and Kane Brown; “Pink Skies” — Zach Bryan; “Texas Hold 'Em” — Beyoncé; “Wild Ones” — Jessie Murph feat. Jelly Roll	**"Austin (Boots Stop Workin')" – Dasha**; “16 Carriages” — Beyoncé; “Deeper Well” — Kacey Musgraves; “Hang Tight Honey” — Lainey Wilson; “Hummingbird” — Carly Pearce; “No Caller ID” — Megan Moroney; “Texas Hold 'Em” — Beyoncé; “Wranglers” — Miranda Lambert
The Male Song of 2024	The Group/Duo Song of 2024
**"Ain't No Love in Oklahoma" (From Twisters: The Album) – Luke Combs**; “A Bar Song (Tipsy)” — Shaboozey; “Bulletproof” — Nate Smith; “Dirt Cheap” — Cody Johnson; “I Can Feel It” — Kane Brown; “Let Your Boys Be Country” — Jason Aldean; “Pink Skies” — Zach Bryan; “Take Her Home” — Kenny Chesney	**"Different About You" – Old Dominion**; “Break Mine” — Brothers Osborne; “For the Both of Us” — Dan + Shay; “I Tried a Ring On” — Tigirlily Gold; “Love You Back” — Lady A; “smoke & a light” — Ole 60; “Tie Up” — Zac Brown Band; “Wanna Be Loved” — The Red Clay Strays
The Collaboration Song of 2024	The Cover Song of 2024
**"I Remember Everything" – Zach Bryan feat. Kacey Musgraves**; “Blackbiird” — Beyoncé, Brittney Spencer, Tanner Adell, Tiera Kennedy and Reyna Roberts; “Can't Break Up Now” — Old Dominion and Megan Moroney; “Chevrolet” — Dustin Lynch feat. Jelly Roll; “Hey Driver” — Zach Bryan feat. The War and Treaty; “Mamaw's House” — Thomas Rhett feat. Morgan Wallen; “The One (Pero No Como Yo)” — Carín León and Kane Brown; “You Look Like You Love Me” — Ella Langley feat. Riley Green	**"Sun to Me" – mgk**; “Blackbiird” — Beyoncé, Brittney Spencer, Tanner Adell, Tiera Kennedy and Reyna Roberts; “Cowboys Are Frequently, Secretly Fond of Each Other” — Orville Peck and Willie Nelson; “Dancing with Myself” — Maren Morris; “Jolene” — Beyoncé; “Perfectly Lonely” — Parker McCollum; “Take Me Home, Country Roads” — Lana Del Rey; “Three Little Birds” (Bob Marley: One Love (Music Inspired by the Film)) — Kacey Musgraves
The Crossover Song of 2024	The New Artist Song of 2024
**"Lonely Road" – MGK feat. Jelly Roll**; "Better Days" — Zach Bryan feat. John Mayer; “Cowboys Cry Too” — Kelsea Ballerini feat. Noah Kahan; “I Had Some Help” — Post Malone feat. Morgan Wallen; “II Most Wanted” — Beyoncé and Miley Cyrus; “Midnight Ride” — Kylie Minogue, Orville Peck and Diplo; “Miles on It” — Marshmello and Kane Brown; “My Fault” — Shaboozey feat. Noah Cyrus	**“A Bar Song (Tipsy)” – Shaboozey**; “Austin (Boots Stop Workin')” — Dasha; “Betrayal” — Warren Zeiders; “Bulletproof” — Nate Smith; “Devil You Know” — Tyler Braden; “Sweet Dreams” — Koe Wetzel; “Tennessee Don't Mind” — Kameron Marlowe; “Wind Up Missin' You” — Tucker Wetmore
The Storyteller Song of 2024	The Music Video of 2024
**"Dirt Cheap" – Cody Johnson**; “16 Carriages” — Beyoncé; “Deeper Well” — Kacey Musgraves; “Pink Skies” — Zach Bryan; “Sorry Mom” — Kelsea Ballerini; “The Little Things” — George Strait; “The Man He Sees in Me” — Luke Combs; “Too Good to be True” — Kacey Musgraves	**"Miles on It" – Marshmello and Kane Brown**; “Ain't No Love in Oklahoma” (From Twisters: The Album) — Luke Combs; “Austin (Boots Stop Workin')” — Dasha; “Deeper Well” — Kacey Musgraves; “I Had Some Help” — Post Malone feat. Morgan Wallen; “Let It Burn” — Shaboozey; “Lonely Road” — MGK feat. Jelly Roll; “Pour Me a Drink” — Post Malone feat. Blake Shelton
The Concert Tour of 2024	The Social Country Star of 2024
**Morgan Wallen, One Night at a Time 2024**; George Strait, Stadium Tour; Kenny Chesney, Sun Goes Down Tour; Jason Aldean, Highway Desperado Tour; Luke Combs, Growin' Up and Gettin' Old Tour; Shania Twain, Come On Over - All The Hits; Tim McGraw, Standing Room Only Tour '24; Zach Bryan, The Quittin Time 2024 Tour	**Morgan Wallen**; Bailey Zimmerman; Beyoncé; Dolly Parton; Jelly Roll; Kelsea Ballerini; Luke Combs; Reba McEntire

=== Special awards ===
Country Icon Award	Country Champion Award
**Miranda Lambert**	**Kane Brown**

== Nominations and Wins ==
Artists with multiple nominations
Nominations	Artist
12	Beyoncé
11	Zach Bryan
10	Kacey Musgraves
8	Kane Brown
8	Luke Combs
8	Morgan Wallen
7	Jelly Roll
7	Shaboozey
5	Dasha
4	Kelsea Ballerini
4	Cody Johnson
4	Post Malone
3	Jason Aldean
3	Marshmello
3	Miranda Lambert
3	Megan Moroney
3	Old Dominion
3	Nate Smith
3	Lainey Wilson
2	Tanner Adell
2	Brothers Osborne
2	Kenny Chesney
2	Dan + Shay
2	Tiera Kennedy
2	MGK
2	Ole 60
2	Dolly Parton
2	Orville Peck
2	The Red Clay Strays
2	Reyna Roberts
2	Brittney Spencer
2	Chris Stapleton
2	George Strait
2	Tigirlily Gold
2	The War and Treaty
2	Tucker Wetmore
2	Koe Wetzel
2	Zac Brown Band
2	Warren Zeiders

Artists with multiple wins
Wins	Artist
4	Morgan Wallen
3	Luke Combs
2	Kane Brown
2	MGK
2	Shaboozey
