= The Hell You Are =

Single by Ashley Cooke

from the album Ace
- Released: October 6, 2025
- Genre: Country
- Length: 2:54
- Label: Big Loud; Back Blocks
- Songwriters: Ashley Cooke; Seth Ennis; Joe Fox; Chase McGill; Emily Weisband
- Producer: Dann Huff

Ashley Cooke singles chronology
"Over When We're Sober" (2024)	"The Hell You Are" (2025)	"Baby Blues" (2026)

Music video
- "The Hell You Are" on YouTube

"The Hell You Are" is song by American country music artist Ashley Cooke. It was released on October 6, 2025, as the lead single from her third studio album, Ace. The song was written by Cooke, alongside Seth Ennis, Daniel Fox, Chase McGill, and Emily Weisband, and was produced by Dann Huff.

== Background ==
Cooke announced Ace, her third studio album, on October 20, 2025, with "The Hell You Are" appearing as the fifth track.

Of the song, Cooke stated, "This is like a different chapter for me. It's a different era. It's kind of like my song, ‘Your Place.’ If ‘Your Place’ had a cousin that's a little sassier and a little more sure of herself, this is ‘The Hell You Are.’ It's a compilation of all the different situations that I've been in, in different relationships in my 20s, and just kind of learning my worth and learning what I want in a relationship. I had encountered quite a few people that would say something, and their actions would just say something completely different. This song is really kind of the realization of calling somebody out on their stuff."

== Content ==
Lyrically, "The Hell You Are" explores the topic of confronting a romantic partner who can only offer empty promises, with Cooke expressing her frustration at the inconsistencies and excuses given for her partner's behavior throughout their relationship. As the song progresses and Cooke lists all the lies she has been told, the song reveals a double meaning for the title, with Cooke flipping the phrase into a deeper description of her partner's character, stating that he doesn't even know who he is. Cooke explained that, "this song is that moment of clarity when you finally put your foot down on what you deserve. It’s calling someone out for their actions not matching their words and deciding to be done believing that it’ll be different this time".

== Music video ==
The song's official video was released on October 9, 2025, and features Cooke lovingly preparing dinner for herself and her partner only to become more and more exasperated when he doesn't show up. After receiving a phone call from him, where he presumably gives her an excuse for his lateness, Cooke and two of her friends destroy the room and all of his things. At the end of the video, the partner eventually arrives, apologising and stating that he lost track of time. Cooke appears to consider his apology, but one of her friends slams the door in his face. Of the video, Cooke explained, "My whole idea for the video was to kind of smash all of this guy’s stuff, like ruin all of his stuff. He was supposed to come to a dinner that I made for him and then he bails on the phone and I asked my friends to come over and we ended up just kind of ruining this dinner. There was spaghetti all over the floor. The music video that we shot for ‘hell you are’ was an absolute blast. I had two of my actual real-life friends be in it. So, Emily and Hailey, we had the best time."

== Reception ==
James Daykin of Entertainment Focus declared the song "the centrepiece" of the album, writing, "riding a galloping beat and western-flavoured guitar reminiscent of Shaboozey or Dasha’s genre-bending hits, Cooke delivers her most empowered performance yet. “You say you’re coming over and you say that you’re sober — the hell you are!” she declares, calling out a toxic ex with fire and attitude. The energy is electric — a mix of pop polish and country grit, fuelled by a fierce guitar solo and soaring fiddle. It's Cooke at her boldest, transforming heartbreak into a moment of liberation and strength."

== Charts ==
Chart performance for "The Hell You Are"
Chart (2025)	Peak position
UK Country Airplay (Radiomonitor)	16
US Country Airplay (Billboard)	41
