= Waves on a Sunset =

EP by Tucker Wetmore
- Released: October 4, 2024
- Genre: Country
- Length: 22:40
- Labels: Back Blocks; EMI Nashville
- Producer: Chris LaCorte

Tucker Wetmore chronology
Waves on a Sunset (2024)	What Not To (2025)

Singles from Waves on a Sunset
- 1. "Wine into Whiskey" Released: February 23, 2024; 2. "Wind Up Missin' You" Released: March 29, 2024

Waves on a Sunset is the debut EP by American country music singer Tucker Wetmore. It was released on October 4, 2024.

== Background ==
Wetmore said about the EP, "In a lot of ways, this feels like my introduction to the world, so I wanted to share some sides of me y'all haven't seen yet". On September 13, 2024, he released "Silverado Blue", which serves as the promotional single from the EP.

The title is taken from "Wind Up Missin' You". Wetmore stated that the reason for this is "thought it was only fitting to name both my first project and first tour after my favorite line".

== Content ==
The album includes his debut single "Wine into Whiskey" and "Wind Up Missin' You". "Wine Into Whiskey" became his first song to be charted on the Billboard Hot 100, reaching number 68. "Wind Up Missin' You" was the first official single to be released to radio, reached the top 20 on Country Airplay.

== Tour ==
On July 23, 2024, Wetmore announced their first headlining tour to promote the EP.

== Track listing ==
Waves on a Sunset track listing
No.	Title	Writer(s)	Length
1.	"Silverado Blue"	Tucker Wetmore; Brett Sheroky; Dan Wilson	3:04
2.	"Wine into Whiskey"	Wetmore; Jacob Hackworth; Justin Ebach	2:46
3.	"You, Honey"	Wetmore; Josh Thompson; Michael Lotten	2:26
4.	"Wind Up Missin' You"	Wetmore; Thomas Archer; Chris LaCorte	2:46
5.	"Break First"	Michael Tyler; Matt Roy; Lauren Hungate; Matt Dragstrem	2:57
6.	"When I Ain't Lookin'"	Austin Goodloe; Archer; Tyler; Tucker Beathard	3:05
7.	"What Would You Do?"	Wetmore; Gabe Foust; Hackworth; Jaxson Free	3:03
8.	"Forgetting Is the Hardest Part"	Blake Pendergrass; Free; LaCorte	2:29
Total length:			22:40

== Personnel ==
Credits are adapted from Tidal.

- Tucker Wetmore – vocals (all tracks), background vocals (tracks 1, 3, 5, 6)
- Dave Clauss – mixing (all tracks), engineering (1, 3, 5, 6, 8)
- Chris LaCorte – production (1, 3–8), programming (1, 3–6, 8), additional engineering (1, 3, 5, 6, 8), acoustic guitar (1, 5, 8), mandolin (1), synthesizer (3, 5, 6), steel guitar (3), background vocals (4, 6, 8); bass guitar, guitars, engineering (4); electric guitar (5)
- Alex Wright – keyboards (1, 4), Hammond B3 (1), piano (3, 5, 6, 8), synthesizer (3, 5, 6, 8)
- Andrew Darby – mastering (1, 3–6, 8)
- Nick Zinnanti – digital editing (1, 3–6, 8)
- Alyson McAnally – production coordination (1, 3–6, 8)
- Andrew Mendelson – mastering (1, 3, 5–7)
- Tony Lucido – bass guitar (1, 3, 5, 6, 8)
- Jerry Roe – drums, percussion (1, 3, 5, 6, 8)
- Nathan Keeterle – electric guitar (1, 3, 5, 6, 8)
- Todd Lombardo – acoustic guitar (1, 3, 8)
- Justin Schipper – steel guitar (1, 5, 6, 8), Dobro guitar (6)
- Zach Kuhlman – engineering assistance (1, 8)
- Justin Ebach – production, engineering, programming (2)
- Steve Mackey – bass guitar (2)
- Rob McNelley – guitars (2)
- Justin Shturtz – mastering (2)
- Lucien Patten – engineering assistance (3, 5, 6, 8)
- Tim Galloway – bouzouki, guitars (3, 6); acoustic guitar (5, 6), mandolin (6)
- Sol Philcox-Littlefield – electric guitar (3, 5, 6)
- Danforth Webster – additional engineering (3, 5, 6)
- Michael Lotten – programming (3)
- Aaron Sterling – drums, percussion (4)
- Gabe Foust – production (7)
- Jaxson Free – background vocals (8)

== Charts ==
=== Weekly charts ===
Weekly chart performance for Waves on a Sunset
Chart (2024–2026)	Peak position
Australian Country Albums (ARIA)	17
Canadian Albums (Billboard)	78
US Billboard 200	87
US Top Country Albums (Billboard)	18

=== Year-end charts ===
2024 year-end chart performance for Waves on a Sunset
Chart (2024)	Position
Australian Country Albums (ARIA)	93

2025 year-end chart performance for Waves on a Sunset
Chart (2025)	Position
US Top Country Albums (Billboard)	48

== Certifications ==
Certifications for Waves on a Sunset
Region	Certification	Certified units/sales
Canada (Music Canada)	Gold	40,000^{‡}
^{‡} Sales+streaming figures based on certification alone.
