= Baby Blues (song) =

Single by Ashley Cooke

from the album Ashley Cooke
- Released: June 22, 2026
- Studio: Sound Stage (Nashville)
- Genre: Country
- Length: 2:54
- Label: Big Loud; Back Blocks
- Songwriters: Ashley Cooke; Johnny Clawson; Seth Ennis; Joe Fox; Kyle Sturrock
- Producer: Dann Huff

Ashley Cooke singles chronology
"The Hell You Are" (2025)	"Baby Blues" (2026)

Music video
- "Baby Blues" on YouTube

"Baby Blues" is song by American country music artist Ashley Cooke. It was released on June 22, 2026, as the lead single from her self-titled fourth studio album. It was also previously included on her third studio album, Ace (2025). Cooke co-wrote the song with Johnny Clawson, Seth Ennis, Joe Fox, and Kyle Sturrock, and it was produced by Dann Huff.

== Content ==
"Baby Blues" was written in January 2025, on the last day of a writing retreat at Smith Lake in Northern Alabama. Cooke and her co-writers (Johnny Clawson, Seth Ennis, Joe Fox, and Kyle Sturrock) woke up hungover after a night of celebratory drinking, but they still needed to finish the last song they'd been working on ("Raised Running"). Cooke suggested a lyric for that song, but it instead ultimately became the hook for "Baby Blues", and they wrote the song and cut a demo before leaving the retreat. Cooke recorded the song at Sound Stage in Nashville with producer Dan Huff.

== Music video ==
A visualizer for "Baby Blues" premiered on November 13, 2025, alongside the release of her album, Ace. Following its release as a single, a music video premiered on September 23, 2026. Directed by Josh Ebb, the video stars comedian Matt Rife, who plays Cooke's love interest, as the two flirt poolside. The collaboration comes after Cooke invited Rife on stage to sing the song to him during her set at CMA Fest earlier in the year.

== Chart performance ==
"Baby Blues" debuted at number 57 on the Billboard Country Airplay chart dated July 11, 2026.

== Charts ==
Chart performance for "Baby Blues"
Chart (2026)	Peak position
UK Country Airplay (Radiomonitor)	13
US Country Airplay (Billboard)	40

== Release history ==
Release dates and formats for "Baby Blues"
Region	Date	Format	Label(s)	Ref.
United States	June 22, 2026	Country radio	Big Loud; Black Blocks	
