= Proving Me Right =

2025 song by Tucker Wetmore

Promotional single by Tucker Wetmore

from the EP Sunburn Mixtape
- Released: December 5, 2025
- Genre: Country pop
- Length: 2:54
- Label: Back Blocks
- Songwriters: Tucker Wetmore; Jessie Jo Dillon; Luke Laird; Chris Tompkins
- Producers: Chris LaCorte; Laird

"Proving Me Right" is a song by American country music singer Tucker Wetmore. It was written by Wetmore himself, Jessie Jo Dillon, Luke Laird and Chris Tompkins and produced by Chris LaCorte and Laird.

== Background ==
The song is believed to be about Nashville-based influencer Bryana Ferringer, the ex-girlfriend of Tucker Wetmore. She previously appeared in the music video for his song "Wind Up Missin' You" and accompanied country singer Riley Green at the 59th Annual Country Music Association Awards. During an interview with Holler, Wetmore neither confirmed nor denied the rumors, but only said his songs are based on true events. He explained:

I don't write songs to just write them. I write them about my life and what I've got going on. I don't really talk about my personal life too often. That's the big reason why I write songs, so I don't really have to talk about things.

== Composition ==
"Proving Me Right" is a country song with pop and R&B elements, with a synth-backed instrumental. Lyrically, the protagonist criticizes his ex-partner for her manipulative, attention-seeking behavior and thriving on chaos. He points out that she wants him to see her with her new partner and he has wasted time dwelling on their past relationship. On the chorus, he underlines that her continued mistreatment of him after their breakup reinforces his belief that he made the right decision to end their relationship.

== Critical reception ==
Maxim Mower Holler commented the song "once again showcases the country phenom's ear for a killer hook." Madeleine O'Connell of Country Now wrote that "Wetmore's gritty, charming vocals carry the weight of" the song's emotions.

== Charts ==
Chart performance for "Proving Me Right"
Chart (2026)	Peak position
New Zealand Hot Singles (RMNZ)	13
US Hot Country Songs (Billboard)	34
