= Sunburn Mixtape =

EP by Tucker Wetmore
- Released: July 31, 2026
- Genre: Country pop
- Length: 18:30
- Labels: Back Blocks; Mercury Nashville
- Producers: Chris LaCorte; Luke Laird; Tucker Wetmore

Tucker Wetmore chronology
What Not To (2025)	Sunburn Mixtape (2026)

Singles from Sunburn Mixtape
- 1. "Who Told You That" Released: July 10, 2026

Sunburn Mixtape is the second extended play by American country music artist Tucker Wetmore. It was released on July 31, 2026, via Back Blocks Music and Mercury Nashville. The album was mostly co-produced by brothers Jeff Stevens and Jody Stevens, with additional production from Matt Dragstrem.

== Critical reception ==
Professional ratings
Review scores
Source	Rating
AllMusic	3/5 stars
Country Central	7.3
Entertainment Focus	4/5 stars
Sputnikmusic	0.5/5 stars

Timothy Monger of AllMusic gave the EP three-out-of-five stars, stating that Sunburn Mixtape "hits its mark well enough, providing a smooth soundtrack for beachside cerveza-sipping." Country Central called a lot of the songs on the EP filler and disappointing, but praised Westmore's ability to go "full-on pop" without losing his aesthetic and integrity. In a more positive review, Pip Ellwood-Hughes of Entertainment Focus described the songs as "tight, expertly crafted, and geared towards radio".

Sputnikmusic gave the album a 0.5 out of five, stating that mainstream country music has declined greatly since the 2010s "bro-country era".

== Track listing ==
Sunburn Mixtape track listing
No.	Title	Writer(s)	Length
1.	"Who Told You That"	Ashley Gorley; Hunter Phelps; Jordan Schmidt; Michael Tyler	3:22
2.	"Crazy to Yourself"	Jacob Durrett; Jacob Hackworth; Matt Jenkins; Tyler	3:23
3.	"98%"	Tucker Wetmore; Rodney Clawson; Hackworth; Chris LaCorte	2:39
4.	"Yours"	Wetmore; LaCorte; Randy Montana; Carver Partin; Sasha Alex Sloan	3:05
5.	"Sunburn"	Jaxson Free; Ryan Hurd; Daniel Ross	3:05
6.	"Proving Me Right"	Westmore; Jessie Jo Dillon; Luke Laird; Chris Tompkins	2:54
Total length:			18:30

== Personnel ==
Credits are adapted from Tidal.

- Tucker Wetmore – vocals, background vocals (all tracks); production (tracks 1–4)
- Chris LaCorte – production (all tracks), additional engineering (1–5), vocal editing (1–3), digital editing (2–5), synthesizer (2, 3), acoustic guitar (4, 6), 12-string acoustic guitar (4), programming (5, 6), percussion (5); background vocals, Omnichord, steel guitar, engineering (6)
- Dave Clauss – mixing (all tracks), engineering (1–5)
- Andrew Mendelson – mastering
- Alyson McAnally – production coordination
- Tim Galloway – acoustic guitar (all tracks), nylon-string guitar (tracks 3, 4)
- Nathan Keeterle – electric guitar (all tracks), acoustic guitar (6)
- Alex Wright – Rhodes (1, 2, 4), synthesizer (1, 3), piano (1), Mellotron (2–4), keyboards (5)
- Chris Small – digital editing (1–5)
- Steve Cordray – engineering assistance (1–5)
- Aaron Sterling – drums (1, 6); percussion, additional engineering (6)
- Jimmie Lee Sloas – bass guitar (1)
- Kris Donegan – electric guitar (1)
- Tony Lucido – bass guitar (2–6)
- Nir Z – drums (2–5), percussion (2, 3, 5)
- Rob McNelley – electric guitar (2–5)
- Cody Perrin – programming (5)
- Mark Schick – vocal production, vocal engineering (5)
- Luke Laird – acoustic guitar, background vocals, synthesizer, production, engineering (6)
- Adam Pickrell – piano, synthesizer, additional engineering (6)
- Mike Stankiewicz – additional engineering (6)
- Nick Zinnanti – digital editing (6)

== Charts ==
Weekly chart performance for Sunburn Mixtape
Chart (2026)	Peak position
Australian Albums (ARIA)	64
Australian Country Albums (ARIA)	9
UK Album Downloads (Official Charts)	55
US Billboard 200	153
US Top Country Albums (Billboard)	31
