= Sunburn (disambiguation) =

Sunburn is a condition of the skin after overexposure to ultraviolet radiation.

Sunburn may also refer to:

== Film and television ==
- Sunburn (1979 film), a film starring Farrah Fawcett
- Sunburn (1999 film), an American film
- Sunburn (2026 film), a Canadian film
- Sunburn (TV series), a BBC series starring Michelle Collins and Sean Maguire

== Music ==
=== Albums ===
- Sunburn (Blake Babies album), 1990
- Sunburn (Dominic Fike album), 2023, or the title track
- Sunburn (Fuel album), 1998
- Sunburn (Sun album), 1978
- Sunburn, a 2004 album by Gordie Sampson

=== Songs ===
- "Sunburn" (Fuel song), 1999
- "Sunburn" (Muse song), 2000
- "Sunburn" (Tucker Wetmore song), 2026
- "Sunburn", a song by Owl City from Soundtrack 90210, 2008
- "Sunburn (Walk Through the Fire)", a song by Armin van Buuren, 2003
- "Sunburn", a song by Graham Gouldman from the Sunburn soundtrack, 1979
- "Sunburn", a song by Tinashe from Nightride, 2016

== Other uses ==
- Sunburn, a 2023 coming-of-age novel by Chloe Michelle Howarth
- Sun scald, the effects of ultraviolet radiation on the plant kingdom
- SS-N-22 Sunburn, two Soviet anti-ship missiles
- Sunburn Festival, an electronic dance music festival held in Candolim Beach, Goa, India
- Sunburn, a playable phoenix/dragon hybrid character from the Skylanders video game franchise
