= Not at This Party =

2025 single by Dasha

Single by Dasha

from the EP Anna
- Released: February 27, 2025
- Genre: Country pop
- Length: 3:32
- Label: Warner
- Songwriters: Anna Novotny; Ashley Gorley; Ben Johnson
- Producers: Johnson; Johnny Reno

Dasha singles chronology
"Wiggle Up, Giddy Up!" (2025)	"Not at This Party" (2025)	"Like It Like That" (2025)

Music video
- "Not at This Party" on YouTube

"Not at This Party" is a song by American singer Dasha, released on February 27, 2025. It was written by Dasha, Ashley Gorley and Ben Johnson, who also produced the song with Johnny Reno. The song reached the top ten in Flanders.

== Background ==
Dasha conceived the title of the song, originally "Not This Party", from feeling out of place at a party in Nashville, Tennessee that she had reluctantly attended and wrote it down in her cell phone. A couple weeks later, on May 8, 2024, Dasha met Ashley Gorley and Ben Johnson for the first time during a songwriting session that Gorley hosted in his Nashville home. Dasha showed Gorley her list of titles on her phone and asked him to pick one of them for a song idea, to which Gorley chose "Not at This Party".

The three wrote the song for 90 minutes, in chronological order. Johnson quickly came up with a banjo riff and recorded Dasha stomping and clapping from his iPhone. For another 90 minutes, they recorded a demo that used a stomp-clap percussive backbone, banjo, guitar and a fiddle part created by Johnson's wife Lauren Conklin. Dasha successfully recorded her vocals in two takes with a handheld Shure SM7 microphone. Johnson enlisted Johnny Reno to co-produce and they also brought in drummer Aaron Sterling and multi-instrumentalist Jonny Fung for playing additional instruments on top of the demo. Johnson and Reno each worked separately on the track for months, adding and subtracting small pieces, and passed it between themselves. Reno piled more than 40 clap tracks onto the production and fit in a sample of them yelling "Hey!" that sounds like a car braking, around the 1:35 mark.

When the song became the choice for a single, Dasha discussed about finding an alternative for the line about "shitty beer" with radio personality B-Dub in a panel at Country Radio Seminar on February 21, 2025. He looked on ChatGPT for a synonym and chose "pity beer", which was then used for the radio edit of the song. She sang it into her phone in a closet at the host hotel and emailed it to Johnson. Warner Records shipped it to broadcasters via PlayMPE on March 10.

Regarding the song, Dasha has said "It's similar enough to 'Austin'. It lives in the same world, but it's so different. It adds this new sonic flavor to my repertoire, and it just felt like the biggest, and the realest, and the most eye-catching song out of this new album cycle." Dasha has also said that at the time of writing the song, she was "going through something with a guy" and "We really tried to capture that mix of distraction and guilt in the song."

== Composition ==
The song combines country and pop music, with the production consisting of banjo, boot stomps and hand claps, guitar, fiddle and mandolin. Lyrically, the female protagonist is trying to enjoy herself at a party but is preoccupied with her past relationship and misses her former partner. The song begins with her in the bathroom at a club, preparing for a good time as she is staring into the mirror, putting on a brave face and hoping that no one mentions her ex. She finds herself drunk during the party and, as she waits in line for the bathroom, desperately checks her phone to see if her partner has left her a message. The chorus finds the woman dancing with others and acting happy, when she is actually brooding over her ex and having a flashback to an intimate moment with him in the car, as well as remembering his unwillingness to commit to the relationship.

== Charts ==
=== Weekly charts ===
Weekly chart performance for "Not at This Party"
Chart (2025)	Peak position
Argentina Anglo (Monitor Latino)	8
Belgium (Ultratop 50 Flanders)	8
Canada Hot 100 (Billboard)	68
Canada Country (Billboard)	32
Croatia International Airplay (Top lista)	56
Czech Republic Airplay (ČNS IFPI)	10
Denmark Airplay (Tracklisten)	7
Latvia Airplay (LaIPA)	20
Latvia Airplay (TopHit) David Guetta Remix	1
Lithuania Airplay (TopHit)	66
Lithuania Airplay (TopHit) David Guetta remix	47
New Zealand Hot Singles (RMNZ)	26
Uruguay Anglo Airplay (Monitor Latino)	10
UK Country Airplay (Radiomonitor)	1
US Billboard Hot 100	97
US Adult Pop Airplay (Billboard)	18
US Country Airplay (Billboard)	44
US Hot Country Songs (Billboard)	25
US Pop Airplay (Billboard)	28

=== Monthly charts ===
Monthly chart performance for "Not at This Party"
Chart (2025)	Peak position
Latvia Airplay (TopHit) David Guetta Remix	7

=== Year-end charts ===
Year-end chart performance for "Not at This Party"
Chart (2025)	Position
Belgium (Ultratop 50 Flanders)	24
Latvia Airplay (TopHit) David Guetta Remix	64
US Hot Country Songs (Billboard)	98

== Certifications ==
Certifications for "Not at This Party"
Region	Certification	Certified units/sales
Canada (Music Canada)	Platinum	80,000^{‡}
^{‡} Sales+streaming figures based on certification alone.
