= What Not To =

Studio album by Tucker Wetmore
- Released: April 25, 2025
- Studios: Sound Stage (Nashville); Card Tables (Nashville); Blackbird (Nashville); Westlake (West Hollywood)
- Genres: Country; country pop
- Length: 56:26
- Labels: Back Blocks; EMI Nashville
- Producer: Chris LaCorte

Tucker Wetmore chronology
Waves on a Sunset (2024)	What Not To (2025)	Sunburn Mixtape (2026)

Singles from What Not To
- 1. "3,2,1" Released: March 10, 2025; 2. "Brunette" Released: January 12, 2026

What Not To is the debut studio album by American country music singer Tucker Wetmore. It was released on April 25, 2025, and produced by Chris LaCorte. It includes the singles "3,2,1" and "Brunette". "Wine into Whiskey" and "Wind Up Missin' You", Wetmore's earlier hits from his extended play Waves on a Sunset, re-appeared on the album.

== Background ==
Wetmore released "Wind Up Missin' You" in 2024, which became his first number one hit on Billboard's Country Airplay and helped him gain recognition. In February 2025, he announced the release of his debut studio album, What Not To, followed the next day by the single "3,2,1". In March of the same year, "Casino" was released as the last promotional single from the album.

== Critical reception ==
Entertainment Focus' James Daykin described the album as introspective, and said it "combining dramatic storytelling with slick modern country production, delivering a record that feels both deeply personal and widely relatable".

== Track listing ==
What Not To track listing
No.	Title	Writer(s)	Length
1.	"Whatcha Think Is Gonna Happen?"	Matt Jenkins; Ben Stennis; Michael Tyler	2:48
2.	"3,2,1"	Josh Miller; Summer Overstreet; Jordan Reynolds	2:38
3.	"Bad Luck Looks Good on Me"	Tucker Wetmore; Julian Bunetta; Jackson Foote; Steph Jones; Jaxson Free	2:47
4.	"Casino"	Josh Jenkins; Alex Palmer; John Pierce; Tyler	2:38
5.	"Takes One to Break One"	M. Jenkins; Miller; Stennis	2:50
6.	"Brunette"	Chris LaCorte; Chase McGill; Miller; Blake Pendergrass	2:19
7.	"Wind Up Missin' You"	Wetmore; Thomas Archer; LaCorte	2:46
8.	"Give Her the World"	Wetmore; Madison Kozak; Chase McDaniel	2:53
9.	"Goodbye Whiskey"	Wetmore; Archer; Ross Copperman; Jacob Hackworth	3:12
10.	"When I Ain't Lookin'"	Austin Goodloe; Archer; Tyler; Tucker Beathard	3:04
11.	"Drink Alone"	Wetmore; Hackworth; LaCorte; McGill; Jameson Rodgers	3:41
12.	"Bad Habit"	Wetmore; Corey Crowder; LaCorte; Rodgers	3:20
13.	"What Not To"	Wetmore; Hackworth; LaCorte; McGill; Rodgers	3:15
14.	"Break First"	Tyler; Matt Roy; Lauren Hungate; Matt Dragstrem	2:57
15.	"Drinkin' Boots (demo)"	Wetmore; Jared Keim; Michael Lotten	2:34
16.	"Drunk on Her"	Free; Gabe Foust; Hackworth; Chris Tompkins	3:20
17.	"Silverado Blue"	Wetmore; Brett Sheroky; Dan Wilson	3:04
18.	"Wine into Whiskey"	Wetmore; Hackworth; Justin Ebach	2:45
19.	"Whiskey Again"	Wetmore; Hackworth; LaCorte; McGill; Rodgers	3:27
Total length:			56:26

== Personnel ==
Credits are adapted from the album's liner notes and Tidal.

- Tucker Wetmore – vocals (all tracks), background vocals (tracks 1–3, 5, 6, 8–11, 14)
- Dave Clauss – recording (1–6, 8–14, 16, 17, 19), mixing (1, 4–8, 10–14, 16–19)
- Chris LaCorte – production (1–14, 16, 17, 19), additional recording (1–6, 8–14, 16, 17, 19), background vocals (1, 4, 5, 7, 9, 10, 12), music programming (2, 5–8, 10–12, 14), percussion (3); guitar, bass, recording (7); synthesizer (8–12, 14, 19), electric guitar (10–12, 14), acoustic guitar (11, 14, 17), Dobro (12), mandolin (17), Mellotron (19)
- Andrew Mendelson – mastering (1–14, 16, 17, 19)
- Nick Zinnanti – editing (1–14, 16, 17, 19)
- Alyson McAnally – production coordination (1–14, 16, 17, 19)
- Alex Wright – synthesizer (1–4, 8, 10–12, 14, 16), Wurlitzer (2, 5, 17), Hammond B3 (4–6, 11), piano (4, 6, 8, 9, 13, 16, 19), keyboards (7)
- Nathan Keeterle – electric guitar (1–6, 8–14, 16, 17, 19)
- Sol Philcox-Littlefield – electric guitar (1–6, 8–11, 13, 14, 19)
- Tim Galloway – high-strung acoustic guitar (1–4, 9, 10), banjo (1, 5), mandolin (1), acoustic guitar (2–6, 8, 9, 11–14, 19), bouzouki (2, 4, 8)
- Nir Z – percussion (1, 5, 6), drums (4, 6)
- Zach Kuhlman – recording assistance (1, 5, 6, 12, 17)
- Tony Lucido – bass (2–6, 8–14, 16, 19)
- Jerry Roe – percussion (2, 8, 16, 19), drums (3, 10, 11, 13, 14, 16, 19)
- Justin Schipper – Dobro (2, 10), steel guitar (3, 8–10, 12, 14, 16, 17, 19)
- Maddie Harmon – recording assistance (2, 3, 8, 9, 19)
- Jeff Braun – mixing (2, 3, 9), music programming (2, 9)
- Will Kienzle – recording assistance (4)
- Aaron Sterling – drums, percussion (7)
- Lucien Patten – recording assistance (10, 11, 13, 14)
- Danforth Webster – additional recording (10, 14)
- Todd Lombardo – acoustic guitar (12, 16, 17)
- Jared Keim – drum programming, acoustic guitars, electric guitars, keyboards, background vocals, production, recording, mixing (15)
- Justin Ebach – production, recording, music programming (18)
- Rob McNelley – guitar (18)
- Steve Mackey – bass (18)
- Justin Shturtz – mastering (18)
- Jessi Alexander – background vocals (19)
- Tanner Johnson – photography
- Sutton Davison – art direction, packaging design

== Charts ==
=== Weekly charts ===
Weekly chart performance for What Not To
Chart (2025–2026)	Peak position
Australian Albums (ARIA)	67
Australian Country Albums (ARIA)	12
Canadian Albums (Billboard)	23
UK Album Downloads (Official Charts)	51
UK Country Albums (Official Charts)	9
US Billboard 200	15
US Top Country Albums (Billboard)	4

=== Year-end charts ===
Year-end chart performance for What Not To
Chart (2025)	Position
US Billboard 200	175
US Top Country Albums (Billboard)	42

== Certifications ==
Certifications for What Not To
Region	Certification	Certified units/sales
Canada (Music Canada)	Gold	40,000^{‡}
United States (RIAA)	Gold	500,000^{‡}
^{‡} Sales+streaming figures based on certification alone.
