= Brunette (song) =

2026 song by Tucker Wetmore

Single by Tucker Wetmore

from the album What Not To
- B-side: "Brunette" (acoustic)
- Released: January 12, 2026
- Genre: Country pop
- Length: 2:19
- Label: Back Blocks; Mercury Nashville
- Songwriters: Chris LaCorte; Chase McGill; Josh Miller; Blake Pendergrass
- Producer: Chris LaCorte

Tucker Wetmore singles chronology
"3,2,1" (2025)	"Brunette" (2026)	"Who Told You That" (2026)

Music video
- "Brunette" on YouTube

"Brunette" is a song by American country music singer Tucker Wetmore. It was released on January 12, 2026 as the fourth single from his debut studio album, What Not To (2025). It was written by Chris LaCorte (who also produced the song), Chase McGill, Josh Miller and Blake Pendergrass.

== Background ==
Tucker Wetmore previewed the song through snippets on the video-sharing app TikTok before releasing it, helping it gain viral attention on social media. The song is about him being ready to date a girl who is not blonde and looking for a brunette instead. During an interview with Taste of Country Nights following the song's release, Wetmore said "I've been known to like blondes. Pretty much every girlfriend I've ever had was a blonde". He also admitted that he had yet to date a brunette.

== Composition and lyrics ==
"Brunette" is a country pop song. It starts with fast fingerstyle guitar, followed by the entry a drum fill and thumping bass drum among other instruments played by a full band. Tucker Wetmore begins by explaining that he has always been attracted to blonde women, but they have mistreated him in his past relationships with them, so he no longer seeks romance with blondes. In the chorus, he describes the type of woman that he is now interested in: "I need a brown eyed 5'5" / North side of the Mason–Dixon line / Kind ain't climbed up in a four-wheel drive that's lifted / Never been fishing never been mudding / Gotta be gotta be one that doesn't remind me of you there beside me / I need to find me a brunette". Later on, Wetmore highlights that he does not wish to find a partner who reminds him of his ex-girlfriends and only wants to sleep with a woman who has a different hair color.

== Music video ==
The music video was released on November 21, 2025. The video was directed by Chase Foster and Wetmore, and stars Hannah Godwin as "the Brunette", Joey Graziadei as the bartender, and Austin Richardson as the Deputy.

== Charts ==
=== Weekly charts ===
Weekly chart performance for "Brunette"
Chart (2025–2026)	Peak position
Canada Hot 100 (Billboard)	36
Canada Country (Billboard)	2
New Zealand Hot Singles (RMNZ)	13
UK Country Airplay (Radiomonitor)	1
US Billboard Hot 100	36
US Country Airplay (Billboard)	1
US Hot Country Songs (Billboard)	9

=== Year-end charts ===
Year-end chart performance for "Brunette"
Chart (2025)	Position
US Hot Country Songs (Billboard)	67

== Certifications ==
Certifications for "Brunette"
Region	Certification	Certified units/sales
United States (RIAA)	Gold	500,000^{‡}
^{‡} Sales+streaming figures based on certification alone.
