= Smoky Mountains (album) =

2024 studio album by Conner Smith

Studio album by Conner Smith
- Released: January 26, 2024
- Genre: Country
- Length: 38:23
- Label: Valory
- Producer: Zach Crowell

Singles from Smoky Mountains
- 1. "Creek Will Rise" Released: April 3, 2023; 2. "Roulette on the Heart" Released: April 22, 2024

Smoky Mountains is the debut studio album by American country music singer Conner Smith. It was released on January 26, 2024, via Valory. "Creek Will Rise" was issued in April 2023 as the lead single, and became Smith's first top 20 hit on the Billboard Country Airplay chart.

== Background ==
Conner Smith co-wrote 11 of the album's 12 tracks, with the exception being "I Hate Alabama". Zach Crowell produced all of the tracks on the record, except for "Regret in the Morning", which was produced by Daniel Ross. Mark Trussell received co-production credits for "Roulette on the Heart", which features guest vocals from Hailey Whitters. "Roulette on the Heart" was released as the album's second single on April 22, 2024.

"I Hate Alabama" and "Take It Slow" were previously included on Smith's debut EP, Didn't Go Too Far, from 2022.

== Track listing ==
Smoky Mountains track listing
No.	Title	Writer(s)	Length
1.	"Smoky Mountains"	Zach Crowell; Conner Smith	2:42
2.	"Creek Will Rise"	Chris LaCorte; Chase McGill; Smith; Parker Welling	2:49
3.	"Roulette on the Heart" (featuring Hailey Whitters)	Jessi Alexander; McGill; Smith; Mark Trussell	3:15
4.	"Heatin' Up"	McGill; Daniel Ross; Smith	3:22
5.	"Baby, I"	Devin Dawson; Smith; Trussell; Welling	3:05
6.	"Meanwhile in Carolina"	Blake Pendergrass; Smith	3:47
7.	"Boots in the Bleachers"	Ben Hayslip; Smith; Jordan Walker	3:19
8.	"Take It Slow"	Ryan Hurd; Smith; Trussell	2:42
9.	"Trouble"	Crowell; Jerry Flowers; McGill; Smith; Trussell	2:55
10.	"I Hate Alabama"	Nick Columbia; Drew Green; Hunter Phelps; Lee Starr	3:34
11.	"Regret in the Morning"	Phelps; Ross; Smith	3:24
12.	"God Moments"	Crowell; Dawson; Pendergrass; Smith	3:25
Total length:			38:23

== Charts ==
Chart performance for Smoky Mountains
Chart (2024)	Peak position
US Top Country Albums (Billboard)	42
