= Conner Smith =

American country music singer

- Born: Conner Vickery Smith; September 6, 2000 (age 25); Nashville, Tennessee, U.S.
- Genres: Country
- Occupations: Singer
- Instruments: Vocals
- Years active: 2020–present
- Label: Valory

Conner Vickery Smith (born September 6, 2000) is an American music singer. He is signed to Big Machine Records' Valory label and has charted three singles.

== Biography ==
Conner Smith was born and raised in Nashville. Smith participated in the 2013 Little League World Series as a member of the South Nashville team that represented the Southeast Region. His mother, Jennifer Vickery Smith, worked in the country music industry and often interviewed artists. Conner Smith was inspired to start songwriting himself. He began writing songs with Nashville songwriters Ashley Gorley and Zach Crowell by the time he was 20.

In late 2021, Smith released a song called "I Hate Alabama", which went viral on TikTok. The song's success got him a deal with Big Machine Records' Valory label. He released an extended play for the label titled Didn't Go Too Far in 2022. The project's lead single "Learn from It" made the top 40 on Billboard Country Airplay. Crowell produced the EP. Smith released his second single "Take It Slow" to country radio in early 2023; it was certified Gold by the RIAA but only got to No. 52 on the charts. He released "Creek Will Rise" in 2023, and it became his first top 20 hit on the Country Airplay chart. It served as the lead single to his debut studio album, Smoky Mountains, which was released on January 26, 2024. Smith made history on March 10, 2024 when "Creek Will Rise" became the first ever number one on the UK Country Airplay chart.

== Car crash ==
On June 8, 2025, Smith struck and killed 77-year-old pedestrian Dorothy Dobbins while she was walking her dog in a marked crosswalk in Nashville, Tennessee. Dobbins, a retired attorney and longtime advocate for domestic violence survivors, was transported to Vanderbilt University Medical Center, where she later died. According to the Metropolitan Nashville Police Department, Smith failed to yield the right of way, though he showed no signs of impairment. As of mid-June, no charges had been filed and the investigation remains ongoing. Following the incident, Smith withdrew from three scheduled performances: the Military Appreciation Concert in Akron, Ohio, on June 20, the Buckeye Country Superfest on June 21, and the Rock County 4-H Fair in Janesville, WI. His representatives stated that he needed to "privately process recent events."

== Discography ==
=== Albums ===
List of albums, with selected details
Title	Album details	Peak chart positions
Title	Album details	US Country
Smoky Mountains	Release date: January 26, 2024; Label: Valory; Format: CD, digital download, LP, streaming	42
Stories I've Never Told	Release date: March 13, 2026; Label: Elah Records; Format: CD, digital download, LP, streaming	—

=== Extended plays ===
List of EPs, with selected details
Title	Details
Didn't Go Too Far	Release date: January 14, 2022; Label: Valory; Format: Digital download, streaming
Smoky Mountains Sessions	Release date: August 2, 2024; Label: Valory; Format: Digital download, streaming

=== Singles ===
List of singles, with selected chart positions and certifications
Year	Title	Peak positions				Certifications	Album
Year	Title	US	US Country Songs	US Country Airplay	CAN Country	Certifications	Album
2022	"Learn from It"	—	—	38	—		Didn't Go Too Far
2023	"Take It Slow"	—	—	52	—	RIAA: Gold; MC: Gold	Didn't Go Too Far
2023	"Creek Will Rise"	89	22	12	17	RIAA: Gold; MC: Gold	Smoky Mountains
2024	"Roulette on the Heart" (featuring Hailey Whitters)	—	—	58	—		Smoky Mountains
2025	"Ain't Got Enough Faith"	—	—	—	—		Stories I've Never Told
