= I Hate Alabama =

Song by Conner Smith

from the album Smoky Mountains
- Released: October 8, 2021
- Recorded: 2021
- Genre: Country
- Length: 3:35
- Label: Valory
- Songwriters: Drew Green; Hunter Philips; Lee Starr; Nick Columbia
- Producer: Zach Crowell

Audio
- "I Hate Alabama" on YouTube

Music video
- "I Hate Alabama" on YouTube

"I Hate Alabama" is a 2021 song by American country music singer Conner Smith. Released on October 8, 2021 as a promotional single, the song is about the heartbreak of a broken romantic relationship that was ended in the city of Tuscaloosa, Alabama that Smith had experienced, comparing it to the Third Saturday in October college football rivalry. The song would later go viral within the college football fanbase, gaining millions of streams on social media platforms and resulting in Smith signing a record deal with Big Machine. It was later included on Smith's debut studio album, Smoky Mountains (2024).

== Background and production ==
According to Smith, the song was written as a song written towards his ex-girlfriend who he had broken up with. Although the song had numerous references to college football, Smith wrote that the song was not about college football, but rather as a "heartbreak song" centered around college football. In later interviews, he would praise the state of Alabama, saying You know how you love a song, but it reminds you of your ex? That's what this song is about. And that's what I love about it. It's a compliment to Alabama".

Production for the song started when friend of Smith, Hunter Philips sent over a demo of the song to Smith. Smith, along with his producer immediately wanted to release the song with the help of a music label, saying that "this song is pretty special". Smith had trouble finding a label to sign for the song, so he released a music video for the song, shot by Smith's brother on Instagram. The video received one million views within the first day of release. Once the music video released, owner of Big Machine Records, Scott Borchetta called Smith and said that he was interested in releasing the song on October 8, 2021 under the Valory Music Co. name.

== Composition ==
The song makes heavy references to the Third Saturday in October college football rivalry between the Tennessee Volunteers and the Alabama Crimson Tide. At the time of the song's release, Alabama had beaten Tennessee for 15 straight years since 2006. Smith, who is a Tennessee Volunteers fan, wanted to tie the rivalry together with the pain of breaking up with his girlfriend within the city of Tuscaloosa, Alabama, where the University of Alabama is located.

== Critical reception ==
Paul Finebaum, sportscaster for ESPN's SEC Network, wrote that he thought the song was "cute", but would not garner attention or hatred from Alabama Crimson Tide fans, saying that "Alabama fans don't really care about anybody else anymore... Alabama doesn't concern itself with others". He wrote that due to Alabama's consistency of winning most of their football games, it has led to an increase for hatred for the team by opposing fans and an increase of an overall lack of care from Alabama fans.

=== Within college football ===
Within the Alabama Crimson Tide fanbase, the song has seen divided responses according to Smith. Smith has said that he has seen some criticize and not like the song, saying that Smith is jealous of their football team. Smith has also said that some Alabama fans had also seen the compliments made towards Alabama as a whole.

The song has seen increased usage when the Alabama Crimson Tide loses, which is seen as a rare occasion by college football fans due to the reputation of Alabama usually winning most, if not all of their football games in a given season. After the 2022 College Football Playoff National Championship, where the Georgia Bulldogs beat the Alabama Crimson Tide to win the national championship, Smith reported that streams for the song had doubled after the victory.

== Personnel ==
According to AllMusic.

- Kyle Briskin – bass guitar
- Zach Crowell – piano, organ, programming, background vocals, producer, recording, mixing
- Avery Evans – electric guitar
- Scott Johnson – production coordination
- Devin Malone – electric guitar
- Andrew Mendelson – mastering engineer
- Luke Summer – drums
