= Who Told You That =

2026 single by Tucker Wetmore

Single by Tucker Wetmore

from the EP Sunburn Mixtape
- Released: July 10, 2026
- Genre: Country pop
- Length: 3:22
- Label: Back Blocks; Mercury Nashville
- Songwriters: Jordan Schmidt; Michael Tyler; Hunter Phelps; Ashley Gorley
- Producers: Tucker Wetmore; Chris LaCorte

Tucker Wetmore singles chronology
"Brunette" (2026)	"Who Told You That" (2026)

"Who Told You That" is a song by American country music singer Tucker Wetmore. It was released on July 10, 2026, as the lead single from his EP Sunburn Mixtape. It was written by Ashley Gorley, Hunter Phelps, Jordan Schmidt, and Michael Tyler, and co-produced by Chris LaCorte and Wetmore.

== Composition ==
"Who Told You That" is a disco-infused country pop song. It uses synth-driven production. Lyrically, the protagonist attempts to convince a potential lover that there is more to him than his reputation suggests. He challenges rumors that he is not truly interested in committing to a romantic relationship and highlights the ways that he would make her happy, such as taking a walk on the beach with her and bringing her breakfast in bed.

== Critical reception ==
Madeleine O'Connell of Country Now wrote that the song "creates an easygoing yet heartfelt listening experience that makes it hard not to believe everything the character at hand is saying."

== Charts ==
Chart performance for "Who Told You That"
Chart (2026)	Peak position
Canada Hot 100 (Billboard)	91
Canada Country (Billboard)	18
New Zealand Hot Singles (RMNZ)	16
US Bubbling Under Hot 100 (Billboard)	2
US Country Airplay (Billboard)	22
US Hot Country Songs (Billboard)	25
