= Creek Will Rise =

Single by Conner Smith

from the album Smoky Mountains
- Released: April 3, 2023
- Genre: Country
- Length: 2:49
- Label: Valory
- Songwriters: Chris Lacorte; Chase McGill; Conner Smith; Parker Welling
- Producer: Zach Crowell

Conner Smith singles chronology
| "Take It Slow" (2023) | "Creek Will Rise" (2023) | "Roulette on the Heart" (2024) |

Audio
- "Creek Will Rise" on YouTube

Music video
- "Creek Will Rise" on YouTube

"Creek Will Rise" is a song by American country music singer Conner Smith. It was released on April 3, 2023, as the lead single from his debut album, Smoky Mountains. Smith co-wrote the song with Chris Lacorte, Chase McGill, and Parker Welling, and it was produced by Zach Crowell.

== Content ==
Lyrically, "Creek Will Rise" features a story of young love, with Smith's narrator and his girlfriend going on a drive in his truck. The title as a play on the phrase "good Lord willing, and the creek don't rise", with the narrator expresses his hope that a large amount of rain or some other inconvenience, such as the truck battery dying, will cause the couple to have to stay together all night.

Discussing the song, Smith explained "'Creek Will Rise' is as fast as I can get a song. This is the first song that we felt like captured my live show". He described the single as "everything I love about country music", noting "it's a great story, it takes you on a journey, it's upbeat, it's made for the summer and the fans right away just really have taken hold of this song".

== Music video ==
The video was directed by Smith's brother and creative director Cooper Smith, and premiered on February 24, 2023. It features Smith partaking in various activities by the lake, including riding down a dirt road, air-boating, starting a bonfire, and enjoying freshly-caught crawfish. Of the video, Smith explained "This music video is special to me because it is an adventure that my best friend, my brother, and I took down in Louisiana. It brings the energy of the song to life visually and I'm so happy to have that memory captured as the video for this song".

== Commercial performance ==
The song was Smith's first to appear on the all-genre Billboard Hot 100 singles chart, debuting at number 89. It was also his first appearance on the Hot Country Songs and Canada Country charts, and his first top 20 single on the Country Airplay chart. He made history when he achieved the first ever number one single (and the first of his career) on the UK Country Airplay chart.

== Charts ==
=== Weekly charts ===
Weekly chart performance for "Creek Will Rise"
| Chart (2023–2024) | Peak position |
|---|---|
| Australia Country Hot 50 (The Music) | 1 |
| Canada Country (Billboard) | 17 |
| UK Country Airplay (Radiomonitor) | 1 |
| US Billboard Hot 100 | 89 |
| US Country Airplay (Billboard) | 12 |
| US Hot Country Songs (Billboard) | 22 |

=== Year-end charts ===
2024 year-end chart performance for "Creek Will Rise"
| Chart (2024) | Position |
|---|---|
| US Country Airplay (Billboard) | 47 |
| US Hot Country Songs (Billboard) | 82 |

== Certifications ==
Certifications for "Creek Will Rise"
| Region | Certification | Certified units/sales |
|---|---|---|
| Canada (Music Canada) | Gold | 40,000^{‡} |
| United States (RIAA) | Gold | 500,000^{‡} |
^{‡} Sales+streaming figures based on certification alone.
