= 3,2,1 =

2025 single by Tucker Wetmore

Single by Tucker Wetmore

from the album What Not To
- Released: March 10, 2025
- Genre: Country
- Length: 2:38
- Label: Back Blocks; EMI Nashville
- Songwriters: Josh Miller; Summer Overstreet; Jordan Reynolds
- Producer: Chris LaCorte

Tucker Wetmore singles chronology
"Wind Up Missin' You" (2024)	"3,2,1" (2025)	"Brunette" (2026)

Music video
- "3,2,1" on YouTube

"3,2,1" is a song by American country music singer Tucker Wetmore, released on March 10, 2025, as the third single from his debut studio album, What Not To (2025). It was written by Josh Miller, Summer Overstreet and Jordan Reynolds and produced by Chris LaCorte.

== Background ==
In January 2025, Tucker Wetmore previewed a snippet of the song on social media and asked fans to give a title to the song. Among their suggestions were "The One That Got Away" and "Three Words", before Wetmore settled on "3,2,1". The song was sent to country radio on March 10, 2025, being added to 73 stations in the first week.

== Composition ==
"3,2,1" is an uptempo country song. The instrumental contains twangy guitars and banjo, while in the lyrics the protagonist deals with a failed relationship and his regret. The song opens with him lamenting the moment of watching his ex-girlfriend driving off into the sunset without trying to stop her from leaving, as he now realizes what it had truly meant. The chorus finds him drinking alcohol to cope with his sorrow, using the word "proof" to refer to both 80-proof whisky and evidence that his former lover probably hates him. He blames himself for the end of their relationship and thinks he should have tried harder to prevent it. He stresses on his self-medication in the second verse and states he would be happy to take her back if she ever decided to return.

== Music video ==
The music video for "3,2,1" premiered on May 12, 2025.

== Charts ==
=== Weekly charts ===
Weekly chart performance for "3,2,1"
Chart (2025–2026)	Peak position
Canada Hot 100 (Billboard)	60
Canada Country (Billboard)	1
New Zealand Hot Singles (RMNZ)	28
UK Country Airplay (Radiomonitor)	1
US Billboard Hot 100	69
US Country Airplay (Billboard)	2
US Hot Country Songs (Billboard)	14

=== Year-end charts ===
Year-end chart performance for "3,2,1"
Chart (2025)	Position
US Country Airplay (Billboard)	53
US Hot Country Songs (Billboard)	79

== Release history ==
Region	Date	Format	Label
United States	February 21, 2025	Digital download; streaming	Back Blocks; UMG Nashville
United States	March 10, 2025	Country radio	Back Blocks; UMG Nashville
