= What Happens Now? =

Studio album by Dasha
- Released: February 16, 2024
- Genre: Country
- Length: 22:32
- Label: Version III; Warner
- Producer: The Gifted; Travis Heidelman; Jack Schrepferman; Steinza

Dasha chronology
Dirty Blonde (2023)	What Happens Now? (2024)	Anna – EP (2025)

Singles from What Happens Now?
- 1. "Austin" Released: November 17, 2023

What Happens Now? is the second studio album by American singer-songwriter Dasha. It was released on February 16, 2024, through Version III, prior to Dasha's signing with Warner Records in March 2024. It includes the single, "Austin", which went viral on TikTok and subsequently became a huge crossover chart success.

== Content ==
Dasha co-wrote all eight tracks on What Happens Now?. The production of most of the tracks was handled by either Travis Heidelman or The Gifted, with the exception of "42" (Jack Schrepferman) and "Drown Me" (Steinza).

An expanded deluxe version of the album was issued on September 13, 2024, featuring five additional bonus tracks.

== Track listing ==
What Happens Now? track listing
No.	Title	Writer(s)	Length
1.	"What Happens Now?"	Anna Dasha Novotny; James Bairian; Louis Castle	2:33
2.	"42"	A. Novotny; Jack Schrepferman	2:20
3.	"Drown Me"	A. Novotny; Taylor Fernandez; Zach Stein	2:39
4.	"Austin"	A. Novotny; Cheyenne Arnspiger; Kenneth Heidelman; Adam Wendler	2:51
5.	"King of California"	A. Novotny; Bairian; Castle	3:22
6.	"Talk of the Town"	A. Novotny; Bairian; Castle	3:14
7.	"Even Cowboys Cry"	A. Novotny; Arnspiger; Heidelman; Cole Hutzler; Bardo Novotny	3:10
8.	"Share This City"	A. Novotny; Keir Gibson; Heidelman	2:19
Total length:			22:32

Deluxe edition
No.	Title	Writer(s)	Length
9.	"Bye Bye Bye"	A. Novotny; Heidelman; Hutzler; B. Novotny	2:29
10.	"Way Too Drunk"	A. Novottny; Jacob Hindlin; B. Novotny	2:53
11.	"Didn't I?"	A. Novotny; Ben Johnson; Emily Weisband	2:50
12.	"Ain't No Friends of Mine"	A. Novotny; Evan Blair; Jackson Morgan	3:32
13.	"Leaving Don't Mean Goodbye"	A. Novotny; Hindlin; B. Novotny	2:59
Total length:			37:18

== Charts ==
=== Weekly charts ===
Weekly chart performance for What Happens Now?
Chart (2024)	Peak position
Canadian Albums (Billboard)	48
Dutch Albums (Album Top 100)	8
German Albums (Offizielle Top 100)	93
UK Album Downloads (OCC)	86
UK Country Albums (OCC)	4
US Billboard 200	117
US Top Country Albums (Billboard)	27

=== Year-end charts ===
Year-end chart performance for What Happens Now?
Chart (2024)	Position
Australian Country Albums (ARIA)	70
Dutch Albums (Album Top 100)	51
US Top Country Albums (Billboard)	44

== Certifications ==
Certifications for What Happens Now?
Region	Certification	Certified units/sales
New Zealand (RMNZ)	Gold	7,500^{‡}
^{‡} Sales+streaming figures based on certification alone.
