= Tough People =

Single by Drew Baldridge

from the album Farm, Faith, Family
- Released: November 4, 2024
- Studio: Sony Tree, Nashville, Tennessee
- Genre: Country
- Length: 3:59 (album version); 3:32 (radio edit)
- Label: Stoney Creek
- Songwriters: Drew Baldridge; Luke Combs; Adam Sanders; Jordan Walker
- Producer: Nick Schwarz

Drew Baldridge singles chronology
"She's Somebody's Daughter" (2023)	"Tough People" (2024)	"Rebel" (2025)

Music video
- "Tough People" on YouTube

"Tough People" is a song by American country music singer Drew Baldridge. It was released on November 4, 2024, as the intended lead single to Baldridge's forthcoming third studio album, Farm, Faith, Family. It marks Baldridge's first release under BBR Music Group since signing with the label's Stoney Creek imprint.

== Content ==
Baldridge, who co-wrote the song with Adam Sanders and Jordan Walker, described the song as meaningful and "about not giving up on [his] dreams". Sanders developed the song's hook ("hard times make tough people"), and they built the song around three verses that cover emotionally deep topics including tornado aftermath, childhood cancer, and school shootings.

Luke Combs wanted to cut the song after hearing its acoustic demo, and Lainey Wilson expressed interest in collaborating with Combs on the track. The two recorded the song in January 2024, with Combs making some lyrical changes, but ultimately Baldridge's label insisted he keep the song for himself as the follow-up single to "She's Somebody's Daughter". The writers gave Combs partial songwriting credits for his contributions to the song.

== Music video ==
The music video for "Tough People" was directed by Dustin Haney and premiered on October 25, 2024. It was filmed primarily in Patoka, Illinois with additional footage filmed in Vandalia, Illinois in front of the Statehouse.

== Chart performance ==
"Tough People" was the most added song at the country radio format, pulling in 107 stations upon impact, and debuted at number 56 on the Billboard Country Airplay chart dated November 16, 2024. It became Baldridge's second top 20 hit on the chart, reaching a peak of number 12 in April 2025.

== Charts ==
=== Weekly charts ===
Weekly chart performance for "Tough People"
Chart (2024–2025)	Peak position
Canada Country (Billboard)	41
US Country Airplay (Billboard)	12
US Hot Country Songs (Billboard)	46

=== Year-end charts ===
Year-end chart performance for "Tough People"
Chart (2025)	Position
US Country Airplay (Billboard)	40
