= Ashley Cooke =

American singer-songwriter (born 1997)

- Born: Ashley Josephine Cooke; June 12, 1997 (age 29); Parkland, Florida, United States
- Genre: Country
- Occupation: Singer-songwriter
- Instruments: Vocals; guitar
- Years active: 2020–present
- Label: Big Loud
- Website: ashleycooke.com

Ashley Josephine Cooke (born June 12, 1997) is an American country music singer-songwriter from Parkland, Florida signed to Big Loud.

== Background ==
Cooke independently released Already Drank That Beer – Side A in 2021. The album was later retitled Already Drank That Beer and reissued on April 1, 2022, adding a new duet version of "Never Til Now" featuring Brett Young. It was released as Cooke's debut single in May 2022 and promoted by Big Loud, the label with whom she inked a recording contract. It peaked at number 49 on the Billboard Country Airplay chart.

Shot in the Dark, Cooke's 24-track second studio and major label debut album, was released on July 21, 2023, via Big Loud. It reprises Cooke's debut single "Never Til Now" and also features new collaborations with Colbie Caillat, Nate Smith, and Jackson Dean. "Your Place" was released on December 11, 2023, as the album's lead single, and Cooke was the recipient of iHeartRadio's On the Verge program.

== Discography ==
=== Studio albums ===
List of studio albums, with selected details, chart positions and sales
Title	Album details
Already Drank That Beer	Release date: April 1, 2022; Label: Big Loud; Format: CD, digital download, LP, streaming
Shot in the Dark	Release date: July 21, 2023; Label: Big Loud; Format: CD, digital download, LP, streaming
Ace	Release date: November 14, 2025; Label: Big Loud / Back Blocks Music; Format: CD, digital download, streaming
Ashley Cooke	Release date: August 14, 2026; Label: Big Loud / Back Blocks Music; Format: CD, digital download, streaming

=== Singles ===
==== As lead artist ====
List of singles, with selected chart positions
Title	Year	Peak chart positions					Certifications	Album
Title	Year	US	US Country	US Country Airplay	CAN Country	UK Country	Certifications	Album
"Never Til Now" (with Brett Young)	2022	—	—	49	—	—	RIAA: Gold	Already Drank That Beer
"Your Place"	2023	80	21	2	3	1	RIAA: Gold	Shot in the Dark
"The Hell You Are"	2025	—	—	41	—	16		Ashley Cooke
"Baby Blues"	2026	—	—	40	—	13		Ashley Cooke

==== As a featured artist ====
List of singles as a featured artist
Title	Year	Peak chart positions	Album
Title	Year	US Country Airplay	Album
"Over When We're Sober" (Brantley Gilbert featuring Ashley Cooke)	2024	31	Tattoos

=== Other charted songs ===
List of singles as a featured artist
Title	Year	Peak chart positions	Album
Title	Year	UK Country	Album
"I Almost Do"	2023	19	Shot in the Dark
"Swear Words"	2025	8	Ace

== Tours ==
- The Baby Blues Tour
