= Ole 60 =

American country music band

- Origin: Hawesville, Kentucky, U.S.
- Genres: Country; alt-country; southern rock; folk
- Years active: 2023–present
- Labels: Three Twenty Four Records; Grey Area Records; The Neal Agency (management)
- Members: Jacob Ty Young; Tristan Roby; Ryan Laslie; Colby Clark; Aden Wood; Dwight McGlynn; Dustin "Catfish" Fuqua
- Website: https://www.ole60music.com/

Ole 60 is an American country/alt-country band from Hawesville, Kentucky, formed in 2023, known for blending Appalachian storytelling with elements of grunge, southern rock, folk music, and traditional country. The band consists of Jacob Ty Young (lead vocals, guitar), Tristan Roby (rhythm guitar), Ryan Laslie (lead guitar), Colby Clark (bass guitar), Aden Wood (drums), Dwight McGlynn (steel guitar, banjo, utility instruments), and Dustin "Catfish" Fuqua (guitar, vocals). The band gained widespread attention in 2024 through breakout singles like "smoke & a light" and "Thoughts of You", and acclaimed debut album Smokestack Town in 2025.

== Music career ==
Ole 60 originated in Hawesville, Kentucky, where childhood friends Jacob Ty Young and Tristan Roby began writing and performing music together in a backyard shed. Their informal jam sessions eventually grew into a rotating local lineup before solidifying with the additions of guitarist Ryan Laslie, bassist Colby Clark, drummer Aden Wood, and multi-instrumentalist Dwight McGlynn. The band name was inspired by the route Young took to Roby's house.

In August 2023, the band released their debut EP, Three Twenty Four, which gradually gained traction online. During early 2024, "smoke & a light" gained traction on TikTok and topped Spotify's U.S. Viral Top 50. They signed record deals with Grey Area Records and United Talent Agency in March 2024. Later in the year, the group was nominated for two People's Choice Country Awards, including Group/Duo of the Year. In January 2025, they made their Grand Ole Opry debut. Later in 2025, Ole 60 released their debut full-length album, Smokestack Town, produced by Jacquire King.

== Artistry ==
Ole 60's sound incorporates a mixture of classic country, alt-country, grunge, and southern rock, creating a style rooted in rural storytelling while embracing modern production techniques. The band focuses on themes of small-town life, heartbreak, nostalgia, and personal struggle, often drawing from the members' lived experiences in western Kentucky. Their arrangements frequently highlight steel guitar, banjo, acoustic textures, and raw vocal performances.

== Band members ==
Current

- Jacob Ty Young – lead vocals, acoustic & electric guitar (2023–present)
- Tristan Roby – rhythm guitar, backing vocals (2023–present)
- Ryan Laslie – lead guitar, backing vocals (2023–present)
- Colby Clark – bass guitar (2023–present)
- Aden Wood – drums, percussion (2023–present)
- Dwight McGlynn – steel guitar, banjo, mandolin, utility instruments (2023–present)
- Dustin "Catfish" Fuqua – guitar, vocals (2024–present)

== Discography ==
=== Albums ===
| Title | Album details | Peak chart positions |
| Title | Album details | US Country |
|---|---|---|
| Smokestack Town | Released: October 3, 2025; Label: Three Twenty Four Records; Formats: Digital download, streaming | 38 |

=== Extended-plays ===
| Title | Album details | Peak chart positions |
| Title | Album details | US Country |
|---|---|---|
| three twenty-four | Released: August 29, 2023; Label: Red Door Records/Grey Area Music; Formats: Digital download, streaming | 47 |
| Songs About You | Released: September 20, 2024; Label: Grey Area Records; Formats: Digital download, streaming | — |

=== Promotional singles ===
| Title | Year | Certifications (sales threshold) | Album |
|---|---|---|---|
| "Brother Joe" | 2024 | | non-album singles |
| "Next to You" | 2024 | RIAA: Gold | non-album singles |
| "Nancy Avenue" | 2025 | | Smokestack Town |
| "Really Wanna Know" | 2025 | | Smokestack Town |
| "Back 40" | 2025 | | Smokestack Town |
| "Can't Take It With You" | 2025 | | non-album single |

=== Other charted songs ===
| Title | Year | Peak chart positions | | Certifications (sales threshold) | Album |
| Title | Year | US | US Country | Certifications (sales threshold) | Album |
|---|---|---|---|---|---|
| "smoke & a light" | 2024 | — (Note: "smoke & a light" did not enter the Billboard Hot 100, but peaked at No. 2 on the Bubbling Under Hot 100 chart.) | 22 | RIAA: Platinum | three twenty-four |
| "Thoughts of You" | 2024 | — | 41 | RIAA: Gold | Songs About You |

== Awards and nominations ==
| Year | Awards | Recipient/Work | Category | Result | Ref. |
|---|---|---|---|---|---|
| 2024 | People's Choice Country Awards | Ole 60 | Group / Duo of the Year | Nominated | |
| 2024 | People's Choice Country Awards | "smoke & a light" | Group / Duo Song | Nominated | |

== Tours ==
=== Headlining ===
- Outta My Way Tour (2024)
- U.S. Tour (2025)
- Off the Grid Tour (2026)

=== Opening ===
- No Better Time Tour (with Dylan Gossett) (2024)
