= Your Place =

Single by Ashley Cooke

from the album Shot in the Dark
- Released: December 11, 2023
- Genre: Country
- Length: 3:03
- Label: Big Loud
- Songwriters: Ashley Cooke; Jordan Minton; Mark Trussell
- Producer: Jimmy Robbins

Ashley Cooke singles chronology
"Never Til Now" (2022)	"Your Place" (2023)	"Over When We're Sober" (2024)

"Your Place" is song by American country music artist Ashley Cooke. It was released on December 11, 2023 as the lead single from her second studio album Shot in the Dark. Cooke co-wrote the song with Jordan Minton and Mark Trussell and it was produced by Jimmy Robbins. Cooke was the recipient of iHeartRadio's On the Verge program.

== Background ==
"Your Place" is a breakup song, which Cooke – in an interview with Country Now magazine, is "a stand against cheating exes everywhere" with what was described an "empowering breakup anthem" that was "riddled with confidence." Fans caught on to the song when Cooke began sharing the song through social media platforms, and later released it on her debut album, Shot In the Dark.

Cooke recalled her experiences with a past boyfriend whom she had learned had cheated on her. Despite breaking off the relationship and making it clear she was moving on, he kept pestering her about maybe getting back together. Country music journalist Tom Roland noted that Cooke had the hook “It ain’t your place” logged into the “note graveyard” (as she calls it) on her phone, "and the idea lined up perfectly with the boundary-drawing abilities that she was developing." Cooke told Roland: "You basically kind of regain your power ... by saying, 'Hey, you know, you don’t get to know those things anymore. You’re the reason this thing broke. You should already know that this isn’t your place anymore.'"

== Content ==
The song follows along those lines of Cooke's experience with her past boyfriend. Roland, in his interview with Cooke, noted the song's imagery, with furniture used both metaphorically and literally to set up the first verse of how a young woman who was cheated on is moving on, and the second verse centered on behaviors, before circling back to metaphoric furniture with the lyric "You made your bed, and I ain't sleeping in it."

== Charts ==
=== Weekly charts ===
Weekly chart performance for "Your Place"
Chart (2023–2024)	Peak position
Australia Country Hot 50 (The Music)	5
Canada Country (Billboard)	3
UK Country Airplay (Radiomonitor)	1
US Billboard Hot 100	80
US Country Airplay (Billboard)	2
US Hot Country Songs (Billboard)	21

=== Year-end charts ===
2024 year-end chart performance for "Your Place"
Chart (2024)	Position
US Country Airplay (Billboard)	23
US Hot Country Songs (Billboard)	61

== Certifications ==
Region	Certification	Certified units/sales
United States (RIAA)	Gold	500,000^{‡}
^{‡} Sales+streaming figures based on certification alone.
