= Wine into Whiskey =

2024 single by Tucker Wetmore

Single by Tucker Wetmore

from the album What Not To
- Released: February 23, 2024
- Recorded: 2023
- Genre: Country
- Length: 2:46
- Label: Back Blocks
- Songwriters: Tucker Wetmore; Jacob Hackworth; Justin Ebach
- Producer: Justin Ebach

Tucker Wetmore singles chronology
"Wine into Whiskey" (2024)	"Wind Up Missin' You" (2024)

"Wine into Whiskey" is the debut commercial single by American country music singer Tucker Wetmore, released on February 23, 2024 from his debut album, What Not To. It is also his first song to chart, peaking at number 68 on the Billboard Hot 100.

== Background ==
Tucker Wetmore wrote the song with two of his best friends, Jacob Hackworth and Justin Ebach, when they were hanging out during a writing session that happened a day after Wetmore's birthday. At the start, they shared ideas for a song, none of which they decided to use. About an hour in their session, Ebach confessed he was hungover, to which Wetmore and Hackworth confessed they were as well. In the next few minutes, they sharing some laughs and stories about their excursions the night before, after which Ebach came up with another song idea and the title "Wine Into Whiskey", which the three would then develop into the song.

Wetmore's inspiration behind the song originated from witnessing his sisters experience heartbreak as a consequence of how they had been treated in relationships. He intended the song to be a moment of self-reflection in the shoes of men who have hurt women's feelings.

In the process of composing, Wetmore and his co-writers tried different versions of the song, such as one that sounded similar to a full live band which he discussed with Ebach and believed "just wasn't feeling right at all". A prior version also included some snaps, regarding which Wetmore commented "Some people liked it, but it sounded tacky to me".

On December 12, 2023, Wetmore posted a clip of the song on the video-sharing app TikTok, on which he began to tease the song until its release. The video snippet has earned over 6.5 million views. The song has soundtracked over 25,000 clips in the platform; the line "I took a good thing and I turned it into goodbye" from the chorus has been used in TikTok videos about relationship problems and heartbreak.

== Composition ==
"Wine into Whiskey" contains a hip-hop-leaning beat composed of 808s and centers on the failure of a relationship as narrated from the perspective of a man. The protagonist laments and regrets having ruined the chances of continuing a good relationship with the perfect woman due to his own nature and self-sabotaging behavior, despite his partner's efforts to maintain it. Tucker Wetmore uses the metaphor of turning wine into whiskey to describe breaking her heart. The beat and Wetmore's twangy vocals build to a crescendo as the chorus starts.

== Charts ==
=== Weekly charts ===
Weekly chart performance for "Wine into Whiskey"
Chart (2024)	Peak position
Canada Hot 100 (Billboard)	64
US Billboard Hot 100	68
US Country Airplay (Billboard)	56
US Hot Country Songs (Billboard)	16

=== Year-end charts ===
2024 year-end chart performance for "Wine into Whiskey"
Chart (2024)	Position
US Hot Country Songs (Billboard)	53

== Certifications ==
Certifications for "Wine into Whiskey"
Region	Certification	Certified units/sales
New Zealand (RMNZ)	Gold	15,000^{‡}
United States (RIAA)	Platinum	1,000,000^{‡}
^{‡} Sales+streaming figures based on certification alone.
