= Can't Sit Still =

2026 song by Lainey Wilson

Promotional single by Lainey Wilson
- Released: March 13, 2026
- Genre: Country
- Length: 3:35
- Label: BBR
- Songwriters: Lainey Wilson; Aslan Freeman; Trannie Anderson; Dallas Wilson
- Producer: Jay Joyce

Music video
- "Can't Sit Still" on YouTube

"Can't Sit Still" is a promotional single by American country music singer Lainey Wilson, released on March 13, 2026. It was written by Wilson herself, Aslan Freeman, Trannie Anderson and Dallas Wilson and was produced by Jay Joyce.

== Background ==
Lainey Wilson first teased the song on January 30, 2026. In February, she debuted it live during the 2026 leg of her Whirlwind World Tour at a concert in New Zealand and also used it in her partnership with Ford Truck Month. In the behind-the-scenes video from the campaign, Wilson said:

When I hear the words "Can't Sit Still", I think of me. I think it's one of my qualities that I feel like has been one of the things that has gotten me to where I'm at. When it comes to songwriting and getting creative and things like that, it's always important for me to be one step ahead… Yeah, this job will keep you moving. My friends would describe me as a suitcase with legs. I've never really thought that you could be in ten different places at once, but somehow we make it happen.

== Content ==
In the song, Lainey Wilson centers on her fast-paced life, refusal to be held back and determination to sustain her success in the music industry and live life on her own terms. She employs metaphors to illustrate her constant drive, comparing herself to examples including a kid in school who is unable to sit still, a leashed dog that is desperate to run, and a raindrop running down a cracked windshield. Wilson expresses that she has possessed this energy since childhood and sings about her continual pursuit of new challenges and experiences, with each achievement motivating further effort.

== Critical reception ==
Georgette Brooks of Holler described the song as "twangy with an infectious toe-tapping spine, rising to arena-ready drums and an anthemic chorus."

== Music video ==
The music video was released alongside the song and features Lainey Wilson dressed in various all-black leather outfits.

== Charts ==
Chart performance for "Can't Sit Still"
Chart (2026)	Peak position
Canada Country (Billboard)	42
US Billboard Hot 100	82
US Hot Country Songs (Billboard)	26
