= Sunburn (Tucker Wetmore song) =

2026 song by Tucker Wetmore

Promotional single by Tucker Wetmore

from the EP Sunburn Mixtape
- Released: March 13, 2026
- Genre: Country pop
- Length: 3:05
- Label: Back Blocks
- Songwriters: Daniel Ross; Ryan Hurd; Jaxson Free
- Producer: Chris LaCorte

"Sunburn" is a song by American country music singer Tucker Wetmore. It was written by Daniel Ross, Ryan Hurd and Jaxson Free and produced by Chris LaCorte and Laird.

== Background ==
The song is believed to be about country singer Ella Langley, with many speculating that it was inspired by her vacation with Tucker Wetmore in the British Virgin Islands and St. Barthélemy at the end of 2025. The two also performed the song at U.S. 101's Heart Strings for Hope benefit concert on March 10, 2026.

== Content ==
In the song, the narrator embarks on a solo trip to relax and play songs at the beach. He intended it to be a short vacation, but ends up staying for the week after meeting a woman. After a few drinks, they bond and spend a few nights together.

== Critical reception ==
Madeleine O'Connell of Country Now gave a positive review, remarking that Tucker Wetmore's vocals "glide effortlessly over the breezy, laid-back instrumentation, perfectly capturing the warmth and intensity of a fleeting summer romance."

== Charts ==
Chart performance for "Sunburn"
Chart (2026)	Peak position
Canada Hot 100 (Billboard)	95
New Zealand Hot Singles (RMNZ)	18
US Billboard Hot 100	86
US Hot Country Songs (Billboard)	23
