= She's Somebody's Daughter =

Single by Drew Baldridge

from the album Country Born
- Released: August 21, 2023
- Genre: Country
- Length: 3:30
- Label: Lyric Ridge
- Songwriters: Drew Baldridge; Jimmy Yeary; Cameron Jaymes
- Producer: Nick Schwarz

Drew Baldridge singles chronology
"Stay at Home Dad" (2021)	"She's Somebody's Daughter" (2023)	"Tough People" (2024)

"She's Somebody's Daughter" is a song by American country music singer Drew Baldridge. Originally released in 2019, the song was re-released in 2023 through Lyric Ridge Records as "She's Somebody's Daughter (Reimagined)". The song is Baldridge's first top-40 hit on the Billboard Country Airplay charts.

== History ==
Baldridge originally recorded and released "She's Somebody's Daughter" in 2019. He promoted the song through a music video which he posted online in 2021, which featured his wife, Katherine, and her father dancing together. The video received over ten million views in a day, leading the song to go viral on social media. However, his previous record label Cold Ridge closed shortly after he released the video, leaving him unable to promote the song to radio. In response, Baldridge re-recorded the song as "She's Somebody's Daughter (Reimagined)". He then founded his own label, Lyric Ridge, with help from former MCA Nashville promoter Louie Newman. The song began to ascend the country music charts throughout 2023 and 2024. Baldridge also attributed the song's renewed success to fans posting it on TikTok.

Baldridge wrote the song with Jimmy Yeary and Cameron Jaymes. Lyrically, the song is about respecting women and the impact their fathers have on their lives.

== Chart ==
=== Weekly charts ===
Weekly chart performance
Chart (2023–2024)	Peak position
Canada Country (Billboard)	22
US Billboard Hot 100	93
US Country Airplay (Billboard)	3
US Hot Country Songs (Billboard)	29

=== Year-end charts ===
Annual chart rankings
Chart (2024)	Position
US Country Airplay (Billboard)	29
US Hot Country Songs (Billboard)	99
US Radio Songs (Billboard)	55

== Certifications ==
Region	Certification	Certified units/sales
United States (RIAA)	Platinum	1,000,000^{‡}
^{‡} Sales+streaming figures based on certification alone.
