= Tucker Wetmore =

American country music artist

- Born: Tucker Payson Wetmore; November 5, 1999 (age 27); Kalama, Washington, U.S.
- Genres: Country; country pop
- Occupations: Singer; songwriter
- Instrument: Vocals
- Years active: 2021–present
- Labels: Back Blocks; EMI Nashville; Mercury Nashville
- Website: tuckerwetmore.com

Tucker Payson Wetmore (born November 5, 1999) is an American country music singer/songwriter.

== Early life and education ==
Wetmore grew up in Kalama, north of Vancouver, Washington, with four sisters; two biological and two step-sisters, and graduated from Kalama High School in 2018. At age 11, he taught himself how to play piano inspired by a love for Jerry Lee Lewis. He played football at Montana Technological University in Butte, where he majored in business and information technology.

== Career ==
After an injury ended his football career, Wetmore turned to music, moving to Nashville in 2020. He released a string of promotional singles in 2021: "Kiss My A$$", "Another Shot", and "She's Trouble".

In 2023, Wetmore signed with Back Blocks Music and later signed an additional partnership with UMG Nashville. "Wine into Whiskey" became his first song to chart on the Billboard Hot 100 and Hot Country Songs charts in 2024. "Wind Up Missin' You" was digitally released on March 29, 2024; it was released as Wetmore's country radio debut single on June 10, 2024. On April 25, 2025, Wetmore released his debut album What Not To. He was one of the first musical guests announced for the 60th CMA Awards, after performing during the 59th CMA Awards in 2025, and nominated for New Artist of the Year for both 2025 and 2026.

== Discography ==
=== Studio albums ===
List of studio albums, with selected details and peak chart positions
Title	Details	Peak chart positions				Certifications
Title	Details	US	US Country	AUS	CAN	Certifications
What Not To	Released: April 25, 2025; Label: Back Blocks, EMI Nashville; Formats: Digital download, streaming	15	4	67	23	RIAA: Gold; MC: Gold

=== Extended plays ===
List of extended plays, with selected details and peak chart positions
Title	Details	Peak chart positions				Certifications
Title	Details	US	US Country	AUS	CAN	Certifications
Waves on a Sunset	Release date: October 4, 2024; Label: Back Blocks, EMI Nashville; Format: Digital download, streaming	87	18	—	78	MC: Gold
Sunburn Mixtape	Release date: July 31, 2026; Label: Back Blocks, Mercury Nashville; Format: Digital download, streaming	153	31	64	—	

=== Singles ===
List of singles, with selected chart positions
Title	Year	Peak chart positions						Certifications	Album
Title	Year	US	US Country	US Country Airplay	CAN	CAN Country	NZ Hot	Certifications	Album
"Wine into Whiskey"	2024	68	16	56	64	—	—	RIAA: Platinum; RMNZ: Gold	What Not To (Note: Both "Wine into Whiskey" and "Wind Up Missin' You" first appeared on the 2024 EP Waves on a Sunset before officially appearing on an album.)
"Wind Up Missin' You"	2024	31	6	2	31	28	13	RIAA: 2× Platinum; BPI: Silver; RMNZ: Platinum	What Not To
"3,2,1"	2025	69	14	2	60	1	28		What Not To
"Brunette"	2026	36	9	1	36	2	13	RIAA: Gold	What Not To
"Who Told You That"	2026	— (Note: "Who Told You That" did not enter the Billboard Hot 100, but peaked at number 2 on the Bubbling Under Hot 100 chart.)	25	22	77	18	16		Sunburn Mixtape EP

=== Promotional singles ===
List of promotional singles
Title	Year	Peak chart positions				Album
Title	Year	US	US Country	CAN	NZ Hot	Album
"Kiss My Ass"	2021	—	—	—	—	Non-album singles
"Another Shot"	2021	—	—	—	—	Non-album singles
"She's Trouble"	2021	—	—	—	—	Non-album singles
"What Would You Do?"	2024	—	44	—	—	Waves on a Sunset
"Silverado Blue"	2024	—	—	—	36	Waves on a Sunset
"Proving Me Right"	2025	—	34	—	13	Sunburn Mixtape EP
"Sunburn"	2026	86	23	95	18	Sunburn Mixtape EP
"Crazy to Yourself"	2026	—	—	—	26	Sunburn Mixtape EP

== Awards and nominations ==
Year	Association	Category	Nominated work	Result	Ref.
2026	Academy of Country Music Awards	New Male Artist of the Year	Himself	Won	
2026	American Music Awards	Breakthrough Country Artist	Himself	Nominated	
2026	American Music Awards	Best Country Album	What Not To	Nominated	
2026	Country Music Association Awards	New Artist of the Year	Himself	Pending	
2026	Country Music Association Awards	International Artist Achievement Award	Himself	Pending	
