= Drew Baldridge =

American country singer (born 1991)

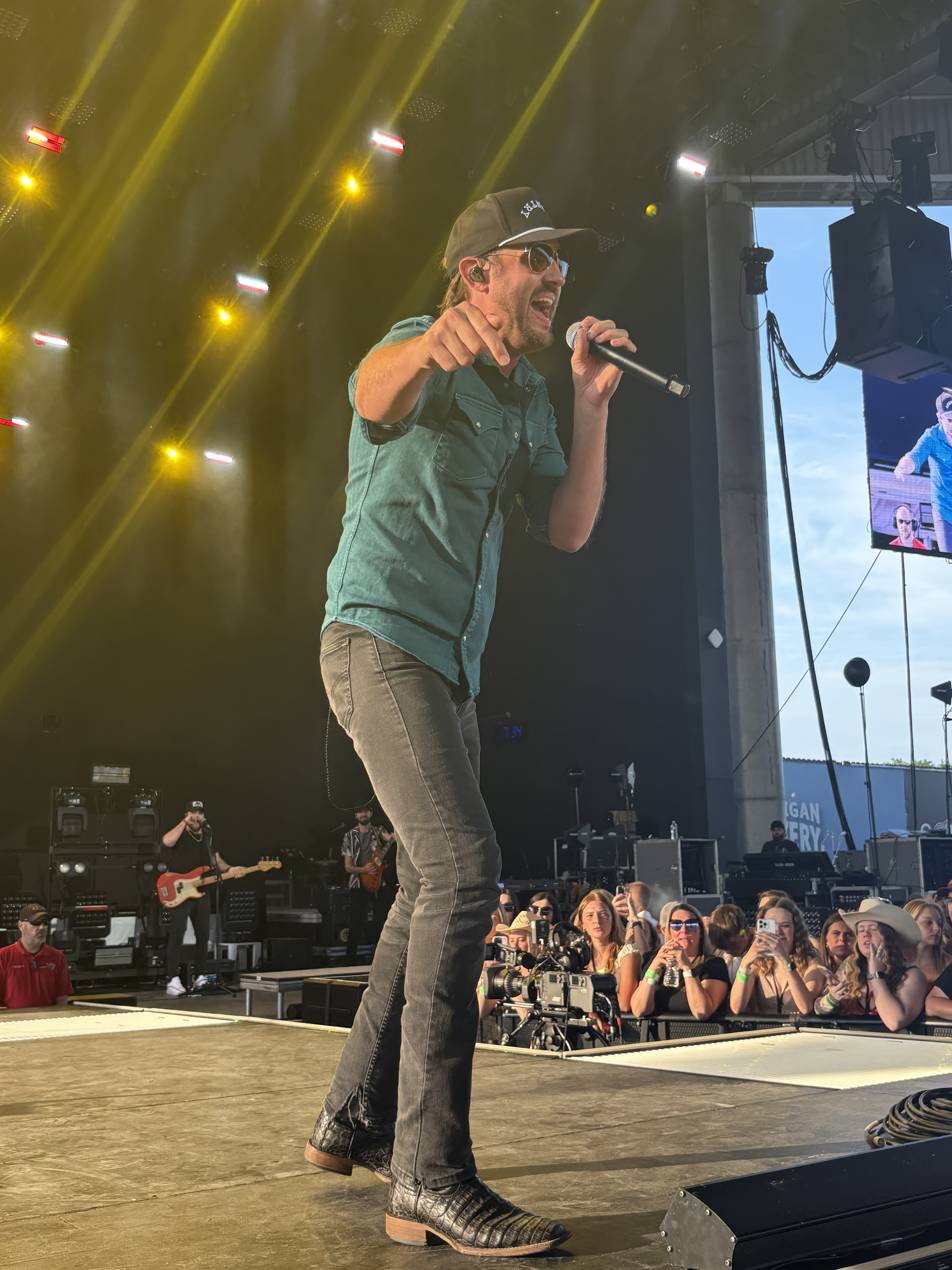
- Baldridge at Sterling Heights, MI (2025)

Background information
- Born: Andrew Ray Baldridge; July 29, 1991 (age 35); Patoka, Illinois, U.S.
- Origin: Nashville, Tennessee, U.S.
- Genre: Country
- Occupations: Singer; songwriter
- Years active: 2013–present
- Labels: Lyric Ridge; Cold River; THiS Music; Stoney Creek

Andrew Ray Baldridge (born July 29, 1991) is an American country singer. He has issued several independent singles via Cold River Records, and has charted several times on Country Airplay.

== Biography ==
Baldridge was born in Patoka, Illinois on July 29, 1991. He began performing in local talent contests as a teenager, and moved to Nashville, Tennessee at age 18 to pursue a career in country music. Baldridge released a pair of extended plays digitally between 2014 and 2015. Later on, he released the single "Dance with Ya", which was officially sent to radio and became his first chart entry on Country Airplay. A full studio album, Dirt on Us, came by year's end. In promotion of the album, Baldridge toured with Lee Brice and Cole Swindell.

Baldridge announced a new single, "Guns & Roses", at the end of 2017. The song is intended to be the lead single to his second studio album.

In 2019, Baldridge's label Cold River closed. As a result, he founded his own label called Lyric Ridge in 2020. His first Lyric Ridge release, "She's Somebody's Daughter", was a song he had originally cut on Cold River. Between 2023 and 2024, the song became a viral hit, and went on to become Baldridge's first top-40 hit on the Billboard country charts.

In 2024, Baldridge signed a record deal with BBR Music Group's Stoney Creek imprint and issued "Tough People", his first single under the label.

== Personal life ==
Baldridge married Katherine Kraus in May 2021. Footage of their wedding was used in his “She's Somebody's Daughter” music video. They have a son.

== Discography ==
=== Studio albums ===
Title	Album details	Peak chart positions		
Title	Album details	US	US Country	US Indie
Dirt on Us	Release date: June 10, 2016; Label: Cold River; Formats: CD, digital download	111	11	8
Country Born	Release date: September 30, 2022; Label: Lyric Ridge; Formats: CD, digital download	—	—	—
Farm Faith Family	Release date: September 18, 2026; Label: Stoney Creek; Formats: vinyl, digital download	—	—	—

=== Compilation albums ===
- Crossing Country Lines (Deluxe Edition) (2015)

=== Extended plays ===
Title	Album details
All Good	Release date: November 26, 2013; Label: THiS Music; Formats: CD, digital download
Crossing Country Lines, Vol. 1	Release date: December 2, 2014; Label: THiS Music; Format: Digital download
Crossing Country Lines, Vol. 2	Release date: April 7, 2015; Label: THiS Music; Format: Digital download
Dance with Ya	Release date: January 8, 2016; Label: Cold River; Format: Digital download

=== Singles ===
Year	Title	Peak chart positions				Certifications	Album
Year	Title	US	US Country	US Country Airplay	CAN Country	Certifications	Album
2013	"B.Y.O.B."	—	—	—	—		All Good
2013	"All Good"	—	—	—	—		All Good
2014	"She's Taken"	—	—	—	—		All Good
2016	"Dance with Ya"	—	—	48	—		Dirt on Us
2016	"Rebound" (featuring Emily Weisband)	—	—	50	—		Dirt on Us
2017	"Guns & Roses"	—	—	51	—		Non-album singles
2018	"Gentle Man"	—	—	—	—		Non-album singles
2019	"God's People"	—	—	—	—		Non-album singles
2019	"Senior Year"	—	—	50	—		Non-album singles
2019	"She's Somebody's Daughter"	—	—	—	—		Non-album singles
2019	"Middle of Nowhere Kids"	—	—	—	—		Non-album singles
2019	"You Brought the Party" (with Christie Lamb)	—	—	—	—		Broken Lines
2020	"Before You"	—	—	—	—		Non-album singles
2020	"When I Fall"	—	—	—	—		Non-album singles
2020	"It's Your Loss"	—	—	—	—		Non-album singles
2021	"That's You"	—	—	—	—		Non-album singles
2021	"Beach Ain't One"	—	—	—	—		Non-album singles
2021	"Stay at Home Dad"	—	—	—	—		Non-album singles
2023	"She's Somebody's Daughter" (Reimagined)	93	29	3	22	RIAA: Platinum	Country Born
2024	"Tough People"	—	46	12	41		Farm Faith Family
2025	"Rebel"	—	—	58	—		Farm Faith Family

=== Music videos ===
Year	Video
2013	"B.Y.O.B."
2014	"Whistlin'"
2014	"She's Taken"
2015	"Missing a Shoe"
2015	"Dance with Ya"
2016	"Rebound"
2016	"Train"
2016	"It Is Well with My Soul"
2017	"Rebound" (Acoustic)
2020	"Before You"
2020	"It's Your Loss"
2021	"That's You"
2021	"Beach Ain't One"
2021	"She's Somebody's Daughter" (The Wedding Version)
2021	"Stay At Home Dad"
2022	"In Christ Alone"
2022	"Little Bit"
2022	"She's Somebody's Daughter (Remix)"
2023	"She Does"
2023	"Big Prayers"
2023	"Can She Have This Dance"
2023	"Honky Town Town"
2023	"I Do Two"
2024	"Tough People"
