= Austin (Dasha song) =

Single by Dasha

from the album What Happens Now?
- Written: May 2023
- Released: November 17, 2023
- Genre: Country pop
- Length: 2:51
- Label: Version III; Warner
- Songwriters: Anna Dasha Novotny; Adam Wendler; Cheyenne Rose Arnspiger; Kenneth Travis Heidelman; David Le Roy; Jean-Christophe Belval
- Producer: Travis Heidelman

Dasha singles chronology
| "Austin" (2023) | "Didn't I?" (2024) |

Music video
- "Austin" on YouTube

"Austin", alternatively titled "Austin (Boots Stop Workin')" on streaming platforms, is a song by American singer Dasha, released through Version III as a single on November 17, 2023, from her second studio album What Happens Now? Dasha co-wrote the song, which went viral on TikTok. "Austin" became Dasha's first single to chart, peaking at number 18 on the Billboard Hot 100 in August 2024. Outside of the United States, "Austin" peaked within the top ten of the charts in Australia, Belgium (Flanders), Ireland, the Netherlands, Norway, and the United Kingdom.

== Background and composition ==
"Austin" came together after Dasha and her co-writers were working on a song titled "Play Dumb" about "knowing you're getting cheated on," which Dasha could not relate to. It was abandoned and the perspective of a "scorned woman" from that song was then used and turned into "something really boot-clappy and fun and kind of badass" for "Austin". It was described as a "catchy ode to a lover who just won't commit".

== Release ==
Released on November 17, 2023, the song went viral on TikTok in March 2024, which was amplified after Dasha posted a video of herself line dancing to the song, leading to it being used in over 750,000 videos on the platform, as of May 2024. At the end of May 2024, the song was retitled "Austin (Boots Stop Workin')" on streaming services and digital platforms.

== Live performances ==
Dasha made her CMT Music Awards performance debut on April 7, 2024, with a performance of "Austin". She made her Grand Ole Opry debut on June 15, 2024, performing "Austin" and "Talk of the Town", another track from What Happens Now?

== Charts ==
=== Weekly charts ===
Weekly chart performance for "Austin"
| Chart (2023–2025) | Peak position |
|---|---|
| Australia (ARIA) | 10 |
| Australia Country Hot 50 (The Music) | 2 |
| Austria (Ö3 Austria Top 40) | 11 |
| Belarus Airplay (TopHit) | 195 |
| Belgium (Ultratop 50 Flanders) | 2 |
| Belgium (Ultratop 50 Wallonia) | 13 |
| Canada Hot 100 (Billboard) | 11 |
| Canada Country (Billboard) | 11 |
| CIS Airplay (TopHit) | 48 |
| Croatia International Airplay (Top lista) | 9 |
| Czech Republic Airplay (ČNS IFPI) | 2 |
| Czech Republic Singles Digital (ČNS IFPI) | 77 |
| Denmark (Tracklisten) | 35 |
| Estonia Airplay (TopHit) | 1 |
| France (SNEP) | 42 |
| Germany (GfK) | 12 |
| Global 200 (Billboard) | 16 |
| Greece International (IFPI) | 85 |
| Hungary (Editors' Choice Top 40) | 12 |
| Iceland (Tónlistinn) | 24 |
| Ireland (IRMA) | 5 |
| Latvia Airplay (LAIPA) | 13 |
| Lithuania (AGATA) | 71 |
| Lithuania Airplay (TopHit) | 27 |
| Luxembourg (Billboard) | 19 |
| Malta Airplay (Radiomonitor) | 13 |
| Netherlands (Dutch Top 40) | 2 |
| Netherlands (Single Top 100) | 11 |
| New Zealand (Recorded Music NZ) | 11 |
| Norway (VG-lista) | 7 |
| Poland (Polish Airplay Top 100) | 42 |
| Portugal (AFP) | 138 |
| Slovakia Airplay (ČNS IFPI) | 3 |
| Slovakia Singles Digital (ČNS IFPI) | 68 |
| Slovenia Airplay (Radiomonitor) | 14 |
| South Africa (Billboard) | 18 |
| Sweden (Sverigetopplistan) | 15 |
| Switzerland (Schweizer Hitparade) | 15 |
| UK Singles (Official Charts) | 5 |
| UK Indie (Official Charts) | 5 |
| UK Country Airplay (Radiomonitor) | 1 |
| US Billboard Hot 100 | 18 |
| US Adult Contemporary (Billboard) | 18 |
| US Adult Pop Airplay (Billboard) | 9 |
| US Country Airplay (Billboard) | 8 |
| US Hot Country Songs (Billboard) | 3 |
| US Pop Airplay (Billboard) | 15 |

=== Monthly charts ===
Monthly chart performance for "Austin"
| Chart (2024) | Position |
|---|---|
| CIS Airplay (TopHit) | 50 |
| Czech Republic (Rádio – Top 100) | 3 |
| Estonia Airplay (TopHit) | 1 |
| Lithuania Airplay (TopHit) | 31 |
| Slovakia (Rádio – Top 100) | 3 |
| Slovakia (Singles Digitál Top 100) | 71 |

=== Year-end charts ===
2024 year-end chart performance for "Austin"
| Chart (2024) | Position |
|---|---|
| Australia (ARIA) | 12 |
| Austria (Ö3 Austria Top 40) | 15 |
| Belgium (Ultratop Flanders) | 3 |
| Belgium (Ultratop Wallonia) | 30 |
| Canada (Canadian Hot 100) | 15 |
| CIS Airplay (TopHit) | 114 |
| Denmark (Tracklisten) | 44 |
| Estonia Airplay (TopHit) | 3 |
| France (SNEP) | 124 |
| Germany (GfK) | 20 |
| Global 200 (Billboard) | 50 |
| Iceland (Tónlistinn) | 21 |
| Netherlands (Dutch Top 40) | 4 |
| Netherlands (Single Top 100) | 17 |
| New Zealand (Recorded Music NZ) | 15 |
| Sweden (Sverigetopplistan) | 19 |
| Switzerland (Schweizer Hitparade) | 22 |
| UK Singles (OCC) | 9 |
| US Billboard Hot 100 | 27 |
| US Adult Top 40 (Billboard) | 25 |
| US Country Airplay (Billboard) | 46 |
| US Hot Country Songs (Billboard) | 4 |
| US Mainstream Top 40 (Billboard) | 37 |

2025 year-end chart performance for "Austin"
| Chart (2025) | Position |
|---|---|
| Australia (ARIA) | 47 |
| Belgium (Ultratop 50 Flanders) | 66 |
| Canada (Canadian Hot 100) | 94 |
| Estonia Airplay (TopHit) | 102 |
| Germany (GfK) | 69 |
| Global 200 (Billboard) | 199 |
| UK Singles (OCC) | 65 |
| US Hot Country Songs (Billboard) | 96 |

== Certifications ==
Certifications for "Austin"
| Region | Certification | Certified units/sales |
|---|---|---|
| Australia (ARIA) | 4× Platinum | 280,000^{‡} |
| Austria (IFPI Austria) | Platinum | 30,000^{‡} |
| Belgium (BRMA) | Platinum | 40,000^{‡} |
| Canada (Music Canada) | Diamond | 800,000^{‡} |
| Denmark (IFPI Danmark) | Platinum | 90,000^{‡} |
| France (SNEP) | Platinum | 200,000^{‡} |
| Germany (BVMI) | Gold | 300,000^{‡} |
| Netherlands (NVPI) | Platinum | 93,000^{‡} |
| New Zealand (RMNZ) | 4× Platinum | 120,000^{‡} |
| Poland (ZPAV) | Platinum | 50,000^{‡} |
| Portugal (AFP) | Gold | 5,000^{‡} |
| Spain (Promusicae) | Gold | 30,000^{‡} |
| Switzerland (IFPI Switzerland) | Platinum | 30,000^{‡} |
| United Kingdom (BPI) | 3× Platinum | 1,800,000^{‡} |
| United States (RIAA) | Platinum | 1,000,000^{‡} |
^{‡} Sales+streaming figures based on certification alone.
