= Seth Ennis =

American country music singer

- Born: November 30, 1992 (age 32); Dothan, Alabama
- Genres: Country
- Occupation: Singer-songwriter
- Instrument(s): Vocals, keys, guitar, drums
- Years active: 2016-present
- Labels: Arista Nashville

Seth Ennis (born November 30, 1992) is an American country music singer. He has released one single for Arista Nashville.

== History ==
Ennis was born in Dothan, Alabama into a military family but he calls Valdosta, Georgia home. He played drums and piano from an early age.

After moving back from Georgia to Nashville in 2013, Ennis signed up for a Battle of the Bands contest, which he won. He also wrote Tyler Farr's 2016 single "Our Town". He signed with Arista Nashville in September 2016.

Arista released his debut single "Woke Up in Nashville", which he wrote with Blair Daly and David Hodges. The song was produced by Corey Crowder, and features Ennis playing all of the instruments himself.

In 2017, he appeared at the C2C: Country to Country festival in the UK and later supported Little Big Town on the UK leg of their The Breakers Tour.

== Discography ==
=== Extended plays ===
Title	Album details
Mabelle	Release date: March 3, 2017; Label: Arista Nashville; Format: Digital download

=== Singles ===
Year	Single	Peak positions		Album
Year	Single	US Country	US Country Airplay	Album
2016	"Woke Up in Nashville"	45	42	Mabelle
2017	"Look at You"	—	—	Mabelle
2018	"Call Your Mama" (featuring Little Big Town)	—	—	TBD

=== Music videos ===
Year	Video	Director
2016	"Woke Up in Nashville"	Dean Lent
2016	"Think & Drive"	Michael Monaco
2017	"Fast Girl"	Jim Shea
2017	"Play It Cool"	Wayne Miller
2018	"Call Your Mama" (featuring Little Big Town)	Jeffrey C. Phillips

=== As a featured artist ===
Year	Single	Album
2022	"First Rodeo" (Cooper Alan featuring Filmore and Seth Ennis)	First Rodeo
