= Dasha (singer) =

American country singer-songwriter (born 2000)

- Dasha photographed on the set of her “Memo” music video at Oceano Dunes, California, in June 2026.

Background information
- Born: Anna Dasha Novotny; February 27, 2000 (age 26); San Luis Obispo, California, U.S.
- Genres: Pop; country
- Occupations: Singer; songwriter
- Instruments: Vocals; guitar
- Years active: 2021–present
- Labels: Disruptor; Warner
- Website: itsdashabitch.com

Anna Dasha Novotny (born February 27, 2000) is an American country and pop singer-songwriter. She has released two EPs, $hiny Things (2021) and Anna (2025), and two studio albums: Dirty Blonde (2023) and What Happens Now? (2024). Her song "Austin" peaked at No.18 on the Billboard Hot 100 in 2024.

== Biography ==
=== Early life and education ===
Dasha was born and raised in San Luis Obispo, California, and is of Czech descent. When she was five years old, she started participating in musical theater productions. She danced ballet and hip hop. She won national poetry competitions in school and then learned to play the guitar and piano at age eight. Her father, PJ, was her first talent manager and booked gigs for her in coffee shops and wineries at age ten. Her older brother Bardo, who is a guitarist for Beauty School Dropout, helped produce her music. She released her first song when she was thirteen years old after PJ gave her a small recording budget.

She attended San Luis Obispo High School, where she performed in Guys and Dolls (2016), Footloose (2017), Annie (2018), and Bye Bye Birdie (2018) and was also a member of the Improv Team. She then attended Belmont University until the onset of the COVID-19 pandemic, when she dropped out to pursue her music career.

Dasha has cited Taylor Swift, Ariana Grande, Bazzi, Dominic Fike, Jeremy Zucker, Kacey Musgraves, Pink Sweat$, Role Model and Tove Styrke as major influences.

=== Career ===
Dasha released the single "Don't Mean a Thing" through Famouz Records in April 2020. Later that year, she signed with Quadio Records, a subsidiary of Disruptor Records. "Don't Mean a Thing" and the follow up singles "None of My Business", "$hiny Things", and "21st Birthday" appeared on the 2021 extended play $hiny Things released through Quadio Records.

In 2021 and 2022, Dasha released singles for her debut album Dirty Blonde (2023).

In November 2023, Dasha released the single "Austin", a foray into country music which marked her first entry on the Billboard charts and peaked at number 18 on the Billboard Hot 100 in June 2024. The song was also successful worldwide, peaking within the top ten of the charts in Belgium (Flanders), Ireland, the Netherlands, Norway, and the United Kingdom. That month, she signed with Warner Records. Her second full-length album, What Happens Now? was released in February 2024. In April 2024, she performed "Austin" live at the 2024 CMT Music Awards in Austin, Texas. In August 2024, she performed "Austin" live at Allsång på Skansen in Sweden. In September 2024, she made her first award show performance at the 2024 Canadian Country Music Awards.

== Discography ==
=== Studio albums ===
List of studio albums, with selected details and chart positions
Title	Details	Peak chart positions					Certifications
Title	Details	US	US Country	CAN	GER	NLD	Certifications
Dirty Blonde	Released: January 27, 2023; Label: Quadio	—	—	—	—	—	
What Happens Now?	Released: February 16, 2024; Label: Version III/Warner	117	26	48	93	8	RMNZ: Gold
"—" denotes a recording that did not chart or was not released in that territory.

=== Extended plays ===
List of extended plays, with selected details
Title	Details
$hiny Things	Released: March 19, 2021; Label: Quadio
Anna	Released: October 10, 2025; Label: Warner

=== Singles ===
==== As lead artist ====
List of singles, with selected chart positions and certifications, showing year released and album name
Title	Year	Peak chart positions											Certifications	Album
Title	Year	US	US Country	US Country Airplay	AUS	CAN	CZE Air.	IRE	NLD	NZ	UK	SWE	Certifications	Album
"Austin"	2023	18	3	8	10	11	2	5	11	11	5	15	RIAA: Platinum; ARIA: 4× Platinum; BPI: 3× Platinum; MC: Diamond; NVPI: Platinum; RMNZ: 4× Platinum	What Happens Now?
"Didn't I?"	2024	—	—	—	—	—	—	—	—	— (Note: "Didn't I?" did not enter the NZ Top 40 Singles Chart, but peaked at number 20 on the NZ Hot Singles Chart.)	—	—		What Happens Now? (Deluxe)
"Bye Bye Bye"	2024	—	—	—	—	—	10	—	—	— (Note: "Bye Bye Bye" did not enter the NZ Top 40 Singles Chart, but peaked at number 29 on the NZ Hot Singles Chart.)	—	—		What Happens Now? (Deluxe)
"Not at This Party"	2025	97	25	44	—	68	10	—	—	— (Note: "Not at This Party" did not enter the NZ Top 40 Singles Chart, but peaked at number 26 on the NZ Hot Singles Chart.)	—	—	MC: Platinum	Anna
"Like It Like That"	2025	—	—	—	—	—	—	—	—	—	—	—		Anna
"Work on Me"	2025	—	—	—	—	—	—	—	—	—	—	—		Anna
"Memo"	2026	—	—	—	—	—	—	—	—	— (Note: "Memo" did not enter the NZ Top 40 Singles Chart, but peaked at number 27 on the NZ Hot Singles Chart.)	—	—		Non-album singles
"82 Chevy"	2026	—	—	—	—	—	—	—	—	—	—	—		Non-album singles
"—" denotes a recording that did not chart or was not released in that territory.

==== Promotional singles ====
List of promotional singles, with selected chart positions, showing year released and album name
Title	Year	Peak chart positions						Album
Title	Year	US Bub.	US Country	CAN	IRE	NZ Hot	UK	Album
"Even Cowboys Cry"	2023	—	—	—	—	—	—	What Happens Now?
"King of California"	2023	—	—	—	—	—	—	What Happens Now?
"42"	2024	—	—	—	—	—	—	What Happens Now?
"Driving Home for Christmas"	2024	15	27	77	63	8	92	Non-album singles
"Heartbreaker from Tennessee"	2024	—	—	—	—	—	—	Non-album singles
"Says I Can (The High Road Tour Version)" (with Kane Brown, Mitchell Tenpenny, Scotty McCreery and Ashley Cooke)	2025	—	—	—	—	—	—	Non-album single
"Oh, Anna!"	2025	—	—	—	—	—	—	Anna
"Train"	2025	—	—	—	—	—	—	Anna
"Mad About It"	2026	—	—	—	—	—	—	TBA
"—" denotes a recording that did not chart or was not released in that territory.

== Accolades ==
Award	Year	Nominee(s) / Work(s)	Category	Result	Ref.
MTV Video Music Awards	2025	"Bye Bye Bye"	Push Performance of the Year	Nominated	
Academy of Country Music Awards	2026	Herself	New Female Artist of the Year	Nominated	
