= Dave Clauss =

American recording and mixing engineer

Dave Clauss is an American recording and mixing engineer. He has won four Latin Grammy Awards for his work with artists such as Draco Rosa, Maná, Carlos Vives, and Shakira, winning Album of the Year for Rosa's Vida (2013) and Record of the Year for Vives' and Shakira's "La Bicicleta" (2016). He has also received a Grammy Award for Best Latin Pop Album for producing Shakira's album El Dorado (2017).

== Awards ==
- 2025: Grammy awards Winner, Shakira's "Las Mujeres Ya No Lloran" for Latin Album of the Year
- 2018: Grammy awards Winner, Shakira's "El Dorado" for Latin Album of the Year
- 2018: Grammy awards nominee, Lady Antebellum's "Heartbreak" for Country Album of the Year
- 2018: Grammy awards nominee, Raquel Sofia's "2 AM" for Latin Pop Album
- 2018: Grammy awards nominee, Orishas's "Gourmet" for Best Latin Rock, Urban, or Alternative Album
- 2018: Latin Grammy Awards nominee, Beatriz Luengo "Cuerpo y Alma" for Best Contemporary Pop Vocal Album
- 2018 Latin Grammy Awards nominee, Carlos Vives, "Vives" for Contemporary Tropical Album
- 2018 Latin Grammy Awards nominee, Raquel Sofia, "2AM" for Best Singer/Songwriter Album
- 2017: Latin Grammy Awards nominee, Shakira's "El Dorado" for Album of the Year
- 2017: Latin Grammy Awards nominee, Shakira & Maluma "Chantaje" for Record of the Year
- 2017: Latin Grammy Awards winner, Shakira's "El Dorado" for Pop Album of the Year
- 2016: Latin Grammy Awards Winner, Shakira & Carlos Vives "La Bicicleta" for Record of the Year
- 2016: Country Music Award nominee, Maren Morris's "Hero" for Album of the Year
- 2016: Country Music Award nominee, Maren Morris's "My Church" for Song of the Year
- 2015: Latin Grammy Awards Winner, Maná's "Cama Incendiada" for Best Album Pop/Rock
- 2013: Latin Grammy Awards Winner, Draco Rosa's "Vida" for Album of the Year

== Discography ==
Artist	Album	Credit	Label	Year
Shakira	Spotify Anniversary: Oral Fixation (20th) and Pies Descalzos (30th)	Producer, Engineer, Mixing	Sony	2025
Maren Morris	Girl	Mixing	Sony	2019
Lukr	Sunstead	Mixing	Easy Company	2019
Drew Baldridge	"Somebody's Daughter" single	Mixing	Cold River Records	2019
Mana	"Rayando el Sol" single	Mixing	Warner Music	2019
Unspoken	Reason	Mixing	Centricity	2019
Jesse James Decker	"Roots and Wings" single	Mixing	Big Yellow Dog	2019
Jesse James Decker	"Old Town Road" single	Mixing	Big Yellow Dog	2019
Jesse James Decker	"Welcome to the Party (the beach life)" single	Mixing	Big Yellow Dog	2019
Judah and the Lion	Pep Talks	Mixing	Cletus the Van Records	2019
For All Seasons	"Every Good Thing" single	Mixing	Centricity	2019
For All Seasons	"Friends" single	Mixing	Centricity	2019
Emily Reid	"Good Time Being a Woman" single	Engineer/Mixing	Universal	2019
Ben Hazlewood	"Louder Than Thunder" single	Mixing	Mint Music	2019
Ben Hazlewood	"The Fire" single	Mixing	Mint Music	2019
Riley Roth	"Friendly" single	Engineer/Mixing	Altadena	2019
Jenna Raine	Nen	Mixing	Jenna Simmons	2019
AJ McLean	"Boy and a Man" single	Mixing	MF Records	2019
Cosmic Coronas	"Dream a Little Dream"	Producer/Mixing		2019
Keelan Donovan	"Like a Radio" single	Mixing	Big Yellow Dog	2018
Ryan Griffin	"Play It by Heart" single	Mixing	Warner	2018
Ryan Griffin	"Good Company" single	Mixing	Warner	2018
Ryan Griffin	"Best Cold Beer"single	Mixing	Warner	2018
Drake White	Pieces EP	Engineer, Mixing	Big Machine	2018
Stephen Carey	"Wrecks Me" single	Mixing	Badlands/XXIII Music	2018
Stephen Carey	"Summer Cool" single	Mixing	Badlands/XXIII Music	2018
Ben Hazelwood	"Fix This Love" single	Mixing	Mint Music	2018
Nightly	The Sound of Your Voice	Mixing	Interscope	2018
Audio Revival	"Build a Wall" single	Producer, Engineer, Mixing		2018
Catherine McGrath	Talk of This Town	Mixing	Warner	2018
Lukr	Numb single	Mixing	The Easy Co	2018
Lukr	Astronaut single	Mixing	The Easy Co	2018
Lukr	Big Kids single	Mixing	The Easy Co	2018
Ashlee & Evan	Ashlee + Evan	Mixing	Access Ent	2018
Gwen Stefani	You Make it Feel Like Christmas Deluxe	Mixing	Universal	2018
Ha*Ash	30 de Febrero	Mixing, Engineer	Sony	2017
Carly Pearce	Every Little Thing	Engineer, Mixing	Big Machine	2017
Lady Antebellum	Heartbreak	Engineer, Digital Editing	Universal	2017
Shakira	El Dorado	Producer, Engineer, Mixing, Drum Recordings, Guitar	RCA	2017
Lauren Alaina	Road Less Traveled	Engineer, Digital Editing	Universal	2017
Gwen Stefani	You Make it Feel Like Christmas	Mixing, Editing	Universal	2017
Pedro Capo	En Letra de Otro	Mixing	Sony	2017
Ednita Nazario	Una Vida	Mixing	Sony	2017
Pink	Beautiful Trauma	Editing	RCA	2017
Audio Revival	Call My Name	Production, Mixing, Engineer		2017
Hunter Hayes	"Rescue" single	Mixing, Engineer	Atlantic	2017
Courtney Cole	For the Love of Me	Mixing		2017
Keith Urban	Ripcord	Engineer, Editing	Capitol	2016
Prince Royce	Five	Mixing, Engineer	RCA	2016
Various Artists	Zootopia (Original Motion soundtrack)	Engineer	RCA	2016
Maren Morris	Hero	Mixing, Engineer	Columbia	2016
Blake Shelton	If I am Honest	Engineer	Warner	2016
Rituals of Mine	Devoted	Mixing		2016
Audio Revival	Animals	Production, Mixing, Engineer		2016
Hollis Peach	Sometimes we Feel the Same	Production, Mixing, Engineer		2016
Yuridia	6	Mixing, Engineer	Sony	2015
Mana	Cama Incendiada	Mixing	Warner	2015
Jaime Foxx	Hollywood: A Story of a Dozen Roses	Engineer	RCA	2015
Mikki Hommel	On the Moon	Production, Mixing	Pure Bred	2015
Lawrence Trailer	#TPWB	Production, Mixing		2015
Raquel Sofia	Te Queiro Los Domingos	Mixing	Sony	2015
Ida Malou	Mannequin	Mixing	Vermont Pop	2015
Bianca Gisselle	Get Back to Love	Mixing	BGSR	2015
Ha*Ash	Primera Fila: Hecho Realidad	Mixing, Engineer	Sony	2014
Shakira feat. Rihanna	"Can't Remember to Forget You" single	Mixing	RCA	2014
Shakira	Shakira	Mixing, Engineer, Programming, String Arrangements	RCA	2014
Sarah Packiam	Again	Mixing		2014
Mayaeni	"Black Jeans" single	Mixing	Roc Nation	2014
Katie Garra	Take it or Leave it	Mixing	Vermont Pop	2014
Shakira	One Love, One Rhythm: 2014 FIFA World Cup Official Album	Mixing, Engineer, Programming	Columbia	2014
Raquel Sofia	Te Odio Los Sabidos	Mixing	Sony	2014
Sarah Packiam	Dream	Mixing, Engineer		2013
Draco Rosa	Vida	Vocal Engineer	RCA	2013
Lawrence Trailer	Declaration	Production, Mixing		2013
Pitbull	Global Warming	Mixing, Vocal Recording	RCA	2012
Declan O'Rourke	Mag Pai Zai	Mixing	N4	2011
Ludacris	Battle of the Sexes	Engineer	Def Jam	2010
Shakira	Waka Waka (Official 2010 FIFA World Cup song)	Engineer	Columbia	2010
Various Artists	Listen Up! Official 2010 FIFA World Cup Album	Engineer		2010
Justin Bieber	My World 2.0	Mixing Assistant, Engineer	Island	2010
Shakira	Sale el Sol	Mixing, Engineer	Columbia	2010
Flo Rida	R.O.O.T.S	Vocal Engineer	Atlantic	2009
U2	No Line on the Horizon	Mixing, Engineer	Island	2009
Wyclef Jean	Toussaint St Jean: From the Hut, to the Projects, to the Mansion	Mixing, Engineer	Columbia	2009
Shakira	She Wolf	Engineer	Columbia	2009
Busta Rhymes	Back on my B.S	Engineer	Epic	2009
Aventura	The Last	Engineer	Sony	2008
LL Cool J	Exit 13	Engineer, Guitar	Def Jam	2008
Cartel	Cartel	Trombone	Epic	2007
Wyclef Jean	Carnival, Vol 2: Memoirs of an Immigrant	Mixing, Engineer, Horn	Columbia	2007
Lyfe Jennings	Lyfe Change	Trombone, Horn, Engineer	Sony	2007
