= Wind Up Missin' You =

2024 single by Tucker Wetmore

Single by Tucker Wetmore

from the album What Not To
- Released: March 29, 2024
- Genre: Country
- Length: 2:46
- Label: Back Blocks; EMI Nashville
- Songwriters: Tucker Wetmore; Thomas Archer; Chris LaCorte
- Producer: Chris LaCorte

Tucker Wetmore singles chronology
"Wine into Whiskey" (2024)	"Wind Up Missin' You" (2024)	"3,2,1" (2025)

Music video
- "Wind Up Missin' You" on YouTube

"Wind Up Missin' You" is a song by American country music singer Tucker Wetmore. First released on March 29, 2024, as a promotional single, it was released to country radio on June 10, 2024, as the second single from his debut studio album, What Not To. It peaked at number six on the Billboard Hot Country Songs chart and number 31 on the Hot 100.

== Background ==
In December 2023, Tucker Wetmore teased a demo of the song in a snippet on the video-sharing app TikTok. The song garnered significant traction online prior to its release, being used in over 83,000 UGCs on TikTok. On March 11, 2024, Wetmore announced the song would be released on March 29. He has also said of the song:

I'm incredibly proud of this song. It paints a picture of young love to me, something we've all had a taste of at some point. Me and my buddies poured our hearts into it trying to capture that feeling just right. When we wrote it, we knew we had something special, but it was the support from the fans that turned it into something bigger than I could've ever dreamed of. You guys changed my life with the last song, and I hope y'all enjoy this one too.

== Composition ==
The instrumental of the song consists of primarily slow-strumming guitar, as well as percussion. Lyrically, it finds Tucker Wetmore trying to win over the heart of a woman at the bar and convince her that he truly loves her, despite knowing she will likely reject him. In the opening, he explains that although his appearance and demeanor may suggest otherwise, his intentions for a long-term, committed relationship are sincere. The chorus sees him complimenting the woman and sharing the reasons why he fell in love with her.

== Release ==
"Wind Up Missin' You" was released on June 10, 2024, as Wetmore's debut single to country radio via a partnership between Back Blocks Music and UMG Nashville.

== Charts ==
=== Weekly charts ===
Weekly chart performance for "Wind Up Missin' You"
Chart (2024–2025)	Peak position
Canada Hot 100 (Billboard)	31
Canada Country (Billboard)	28
New Zealand Hot Singles (RMNZ)	13
US Billboard Hot 100	31
US Country Airplay (Billboard)	2
US Hot Country Songs (Billboard)	6

=== Year-end charts ===
2024 year-end chart performance for "Wind Up Missin' You"
Chart (2024)	Position
Canada (Canadian Hot 100)	82
US Billboard Hot 100	95
US Hot Country Songs (Billboard)	28

2025 year-end chart performance for "Wind Up Missin' You"
Chart (2025)	Position
US Country Airplay (Billboard)	48
US Hot Country Songs (Billboard)	31

== Certifications ==
Certifications for "Wind Up Missin' You"
Region	Certification	Certified units/sales
New Zealand (RMNZ)	Platinum	30,000^{‡}
United States (RIAA)	2× Platinum	2,000,000^{‡}
^{‡} Sales+streaming figures based on certification alone.
