= List of Grey Cup halftime shows =

The following is a list of halftime performances that have occurred at the Grey Cup, the championship game of the Canadian Football League. Until 1989, the Grey Cup halftime performance, if one occurred, was usually a marching band. The 1990 halftime show featured a number of dance teams, then in 1991 the modern style of a performance by a well known (often Canadian) recording artist was introduced, with Luba and Burton Cummings.

== History ==
=== 1990s ===
| Grey Cup | Date | Location | Performer(s) | Setlist |
|---|---|---|---|---|
| 78th | November 25, 1990 | BC Place Stadium (Vancouver, British Columbia) | Esmeralda Colombian Dance Group; Mlada Srbadia Serbian Folk Dance Group; Joy of Movement Studio; Yuen's Institute of Tae Kwon-do; Hungarian Csardas Dancers of Vancouver | —N/a |
| 79th | November 24, 1991 | Winnipeg Stadium (Winnipeg, Manitoba) | Luba; Burton Cummings | "Giving Away the Miracle" |
| 80th | November 29, 1992 | SkyDome (Toronto, Ontario) | Dan Hill; Celine Dion | "Is It Really Love" (Dan Hill); "Love Can Move Mountains" (Celine Dion) |
| 81st | November 28, 1993 | McMahon Stadium (Calgary, Alberta) | Miss Molly | —N/a |
| 82nd | November 27, 1994 | BC Place Stadium (Vancouver, British Columbia) | Tom Cochrane | "Life Is a Highway"; "No Regrets" |
| 83rd | November 19, 1995 | Taylor Field (Regina, Saskatchewan) | Jack Semple | "Huddle Up In Saskatchewan"; "We Sing Saskatchewan" |
| 84th | November 24, 1996 | Ivor Wynne Stadium (Hamilton, Ontario) | The Nylons | "Time of the Season"; "The Girl Can't Help It"; "Kiss Him Goodbye" |
| 85th | November 16, 1997 | Commonwealth Stadium (Edmonton, Alberta) | Trooper | "Raise a Little Hell" |
| 86th | November 22, 1998 | Winnipeg Stadium (Winnipeg, Manitoba) | Love Inc. | —N/a |
| 87th | November 28, 1999 | BC Place Stadium (Vancouver, British Columbia) | Parablegics with local high school cheerleaders | —N/a |

=== 2000s ===
| Grey Cup | Date | Location | Performer(s) | Setlist |
|---|---|---|---|---|
| 88th | November 26, 2000 | McMahon Stadium (Calgary, Alberta) | The Guess Who | "No Time"; "Bus Rider" |
| 89th | November 25, 2001 | Olympic Stadium (Montreal, Quebec) | Sass Jordan; Michel Pagliaro | —N/a |
| 90th | November 24, 2002 | Commonwealth Stadium (Edmonton, Alberta) | Shania Twain | "I'm Gonna Getcha Good!"; "Up!" |
| 91st | November 16, 2003 | Taylor Field (Regina, Saskatchewan) | Bryan Adams; Sam Roberts | "Can't Stop This Thing We Started" (Bryan Adams); "Where Have All the Good People Gone?" (Sam Roberts); "Summer of '69" (Bryan Adams) |
| 92nd | November 21, 2004 | Frank Clair Stadium (Ottawa, Ontario) | The Tragically Hip | "Gus: The Polar Bear from Central Park"; "Courage" |
| 93rd | November 27, 2005 | BC Place Stadium (Vancouver, British Columbia) | The Black Eyed Peas | "Pump It"; "Don't Phunk with My Heart"; "My Humps"; "Let's Get It Started" |
| 94th | November 19, 2006 | Canad Inns Stadium (Winnipeg, Manitoba) | Nelly Furtado featuring Saukrates | "Força"; "Promiscuous"; "Maneater" |
| 95th | November 25, 2007 | Rogers Centre (Toronto, Ontario) | Lenny Kravitz | "Bring It On"; "American Woman"; "Are You Gonna Go My Way" |
| 96th | November 23, 2008 | Olympic Stadium (Montreal, Quebec) | Theory of a Deadman; Suzie McNeil; Andrée Watters | "So Happy (Theory of a Deadman); "No Surprise" (Theory of a Deadman); "Believe" (Theory of a Deadman with Suzie McNeil); "Minuit" (Andrée Watters) |
| 97th | November 29, 2009 | McMahon Stadium (Calgary, Alberta) | Blue Rodeo | "Til I Am Myself Again"; "Hasn't Hit Me Yet"; "Lost Together" |

=== 2010s ===
| Grey Cup | Date | Location | Sponsor | Performer(s) | Setlist |
|---|---|---|---|---|---|
| 98th | November 28, 2010 | Commonwealth Stadium (Edmonton, Alberta) | | Bachman & Turner | "Roll On Down the Highway"; "You Ain't Seen Nothing Yet"; "Let It Ride"; "Slave To The Rhythm"; "Takin' Care of Business" |
| 99th | November 27, 2011 | BC Place Stadium (Vancouver, British Columbia) | | Nickelback | "Animals"; "When We Stand Together"; "Burn It to the Ground" |
| 100th | November 25, 2012 | Rogers Centre (Toronto, Ontario) | | Justin Bieber; Carly Rae Jepsen; Marianas Trench; Gordon Lightfoot | "Canadian Railroad Trilogy" (Gordon Lightfoot); "Stutter" (Marianas Trench); "This Kiss" (Carly Rae Jepsen); "Call Me Maybe" (Carly Rae Jepsen); "Boyfriend" (Justin Bieber); "Beauty and a Beat" (Justin Bieber) |
| 101st | November 24, 2013 | Mosaic Stadium at Taylor Field (Regina, Saskatchewan) | SiriusXM | Hedley | "Anything"; "Invincible"; "Cha-Ching" |
| 102nd | November 30, 2014 | BC Place Stadium (Vancouver, British Columbia) | | Imagine Dragons | "I Bet My Life"; "Demons"; "Radioactive" |
| 103rd | November 29, 2015 | Investors Group Field (Winnipeg, Manitoba) | Nissan Titan | Fall Out Boy | "Centuries"; "Irresistible"; "Uma Thurman"; "Thnks fr th Mmrs"; "My Songs Know What You Did in the Dark (Light Em Up)" |
| 104th | November 27, 2016 | BMO Field (Toronto, Ontario) | Freedom Mobile | OneRepublic | "Love Runs Out"; "Let's Hurt Tonight"; "Counting Stars" |
| 105th | November 26, 2017 | TD Place Stadium (Ottawa, Ontario) | Freedom Mobile | Shania Twain | "That Don't Impress Me Much"; "Life's About to Get Good"; "Man! I Feel Like A Woman!" |
| 106th | November 25, 2018 | Commonwealth Stadium (Edmonton, Alberta) | Freedom Mobile | Alessia Cara | "Here"; "Wild Things"; "Trust My Lonely"; "Scars To Your Beautiful"; "Growing Pains"; "How Far I'll Go"; "Stay" |
| 107th | November 24, 2019 | McMahon Stadium (Calgary, Alberta) | Freedom Mobile | Keith Urban | "Somewhere in My Car"; "Somebody Like You"; "Blue Ain't Your Color"; "The Fighter" feat. Carrie Underwood; "Wasted Time" |

=== 2020s ===
| Grey Cup | Date | Location | Sponsor | Performer(s) | Setlist |
|---|---|---|---|---|---|
| 108th | December 12, 2021 | Tim Hortons Field (Hamilton, Ontario) | Twisted Tea | Arkells The Lumineers K.Flay | "Years in the Making"; "Leather Jacket"; "Quitting You"; "Ophelia" (The Lumineers); "You Can Get It" (with K.Flay); "Knocking At the Door" |
| 109th | November 20, 2022 | Mosaic Stadium (Regina, Saskatchewan) | Twisted Tea | Tyler Hubbard Jordan Davis; Josh Ross | "What My World Spins Around" (Jordan Davis); "Singles You Up" (Jordan Davis); "Take It from Me (Jordan Davis); "On a Different Night" (Josh Ross); "Dancin' in the Country" (Tyler Hubbard); "Cruise" (Tyler Hubbard); "5 Foot 9" (Tyler Hubbard); "Buy Dirt" (Jordan Davis) |
| 110th | November 19, 2023 | Tim Hortons Field (Hamilton, Ontario) | Twisted Tea | Green Day | "The American Dream Is Killing Me"; "Basket Case"; "Boulevard of Broken Dreams"; "Holiday" |
| 111th | November 17, 2024 | BC Place (Vancouver, British Columbia) | Twisted Tea | Jonas Brothers | "What a Man Gotta Do"; "Waffle House"; "Jealous" (Nick Jonas); "Cake by the Ocean" (DNCE); "Leave Before You Love Me"; "Burnin Up"; "Only Human"; "Sucker" |
| 112th | November 16, 2025 | Princess Auto Stadium (Winnipeg, Manitoba) | Bud Light | MGK | "Starman"; "Don't Wait Run Fast"; "Bloody Valentine"; "Lonely Road"; "My Ex's Best Friend"; "Vampire Diaries"; "Cliché" |
| 113th | November 15, 2026 | McMahon Stadium (Calgary, Alberta) | Bud Light | Riley Green | "There Was This Girl"; "Worst Way"; "Change My Mind"; "Think as You Drunk" |
| 114th | November 7, 2027 | Mosaic Stadium (Regina,Saskatchewan) | TBD | TBD | TBD |

== See also ==
- List of AFL Grand Final pre-match performances
- List of Super Bowl halftime shows
