= Bluebird Days =

Studio album by Jordan Davis
- Released: February 17, 2023
- Studio: Ronnie's Place (Nashville); Sound Stage (Nashville); The Castle (Franklin); Breckenridge (Nashville)
- Genre: Country
- Length: 53:33
- Label: MCA Nashville
- Producer: Paul DiGiovanni

Jordan Davis chronology
| Home State (2018) | Bluebird Days (2023) | Learn the Hard Way (2025) |

Singles from Bluebird Days
- 1. "Buy Dirt" Released: July 19, 2021; 2. "What My World Spins Around" Released: May 27, 2022; 3. "Next Thing You Know" Released: February 21, 2023; 4. "Tucson Too Late" Released: August 21, 2023

Bluebird Days is the second studio album by American country music singer Jordan Davis. The album was released February 17, 2023 via MCA Nashville.

== Content ==
Bluebird Days is Jordan Davis' second album, following his 2018 release Home State. In between these two albums he released two extended plays: a self-titled one in 2020 and Buy Dirt in 2021. These respectively included the singles "Almost Maybes" and "Buy Dirt", a duet with Luke Bryan, which is also included on Bluebird Days. Davis wrote most of the songs on the album with his brother Jacob, as well as "Buy Dirt" co-writer Matt Jenkins. Paul DiGiovanni, lead guitarist of the band Boys Like Girls, produced the album.

== Critical reception ==
Rating it three stars out of five, Stephen Thomas Erlewine of AllMusic wrote that the album "may have a soft, gentle touch, but it benefits from Davis not sounding nearly as chipper as he did on Home State...It's a subtle difference but one that makes Bluebird Days an easier record to enjoy."

== Track listing ==
Bluebird Days track listing
| No. | Title | Writer(s) | Length |
|---|---|---|---|
| 1. | "Damn Good Time" | Jordan Davis; Matt Dragstrem; Chase McGill | 2:41 |
| 2. | "Money Isn't Real" | Jake Mitchell; Jameson Rodgers; Josh Thompson; Sarah Turner | 3:15 |
| 3. | "Tucson Too Late" | Jacob Davis; Jordan Davis; Josh Jenkins; Matt Jenkins | 2:52 |
| 4. | "What My World Spins Around" | Jordan Davis; Dragstrem; Ryan Hurd | 3:06 |
| 5. | "Sunday Saints" | Benjy Davis; Jacob Davis; Jordan Davis | 3:39 |
| 6. | "No Time Soon" | Jacob Davis; Jordan Davis; J. Jenkins; M. Jenkins | 3:21 |
| 7. | "You've Got My Number" | Jordan Davis; Jason Gantt; Josh Osborne | 2:54 |
| 8. | "Next Thing You Know" | Jordan Davis; Greylan James; McGill; Osborne | 2:55 |
| 9. | "Fishing Spot" | Will Bundy; Jordan Davis; Josh Miller; Thompson | 3:27 |
| 10. | "One Beer in Front of the Other" | Jacob Davis; Jordan Davis; J. Jenkins; M. Jenkins | 3:05 |
| 11. | "Bluebird Days" | Jacob Davis; Jordan Davis; Josh Dorr; Chris LaCorte | 3:46 |
| 12. | "Part of It" | Jacob Davis; Jordan Davis; Matt McKinney; Jason Wheeler | 3:08 |
| 13. | "Short Fuse" | Jordan Davis; Paul DiGiovanni; Thompson; Emily Weisband | 2:49 |
| 14. | "Whiskey Weak" | Jordan Davis; DiGiovanni; Jamie Paulin | 2:45 |
| 15. | "Midnight Crisis" (featuring Danielle Bradbery) | Jordan Davis; DiGiovanni; Derrick Southerland | 3:23 |
| 16. | "What I Wouldn't Do" | Matthew McVaney; Emily Reid; Travis Wood | 3:28 |
| 17. | "Buy Dirt" (featuring Luke Bryan) | Jacob Davis; Jordan Davis; J. Jenkins; M. Jenkins | 2:47 |
| Total length: | | | 53:33 |

== Personnel ==
Credits adapted from the album's liner notes.

- Jordan Davis – vocals
- Paul DiGiovanni – acoustic guitar, background vocals, banjo, Dobro, electric guitar, programming, production, digital editing
- Jason Gantt – bass, electric guitar, programming
- David Huff – programming
- Danny Rader – acoustic guitar, Dobro
- Jimmie Lee Sloas – bass
- Tony Lucido – bass
- Ilya Toshinskiy – acoustic guitar
- Derek Wells – electric guitar
- Alex Wright – keyboards
- Nir Z – drums
- Luke Bryan – featured vocals on "Buy Dirt"
- Danielle Bradbery – featured vocals on "Midnight Crisis"
- Jim Cooley – recording
- Kam Luchterhand – recording
- Zach Kuhlman – recording assistance
- Jordan Reed – recording assistance
- Joel McKenney – recording assistance
- Trey Keller – additional recording
- Jim Cooley – mixing
- Mike "Frog" Griffith – production coordination
- Randy Merrill – mastering
- Patchwork – art direction
- Claire Schaper – design
- Harper Smith – photography
- Evan Simonitsch – wardrobe styling
- Kera Jackson – art production

== Charts ==
=== Weekly charts ===
Weekly chart performance for Bluebird Days
| Chart (2023–2025) | Peak position |
|---|---|
| Australian Albums (ARIA) | 82 |
| Australian Country Albums (ARIA) | 7 |
| Canadian Albums (Billboard) | 18 |
| UK Country Albums (OCC) | 7 |
| US Billboard 200 | 19 |
| US Top Country Albums (Billboard) | 3 |

=== Year-end charts ===
2023 year-end chart performance for Bluebird Days
| Chart (2023) | Position |
|---|---|
| US Billboard 200 | 116 |
| US Top Country Albums (Billboard) | 22 |

2024 year-end chart performance for Bluebird Days
| Chart (2024) | Position |
|---|---|
| Australian Country Albums (ARIA) | 21 |
| US Billboard 200 | 154 |
| US Top Country Albums (Billboard) | 27 |

2025 year-end chart performance for Bluebird Days
| Chart (2025) | Position |
|---|---|
| US Top Country Albums (Billboard) | 72 |

== Certifications and sales ==
Certifications and sales for "Bluebird Days"
| Region | Certification | Certified units/sales |
|---|---|---|
| Canada (Music Canada) | Platinum | 80,000^{‡} |
| United States (RIAA) | Platinum | 1,000,000^{‡} |
^{‡} Sales+streaming figures based on certification alone.
