= Learn the Hard Way =

Studio album by Jordan Davis
- Released: August 15, 2025
- Studio: Blackbird (Nashville); Sound Stage (Nashville); Frontstage (Nashville); The Foundry (Nashville); Shocatsound (Nashville); Breckenridge (Franklin); Holler (Franklin); Skyline (Nashville); Santa's Workshop (Nashville); TB12 (Nashville)
- Genre: Country
- Length: 49:31
- Label: MCA Nashville
- Producer: Paul DiGiovanni

Jordan Davis chronology
Bluebird Days (2023)	Learn the Hard Way (2025)

Singles from Learn the Hard Way
- 1. "I Ain't Sayin'" Released: July 26, 2024; 2. "Bar None" Released: March 28, 2025; 3. "Turn This Truck Around" Released: October 27, 2025

Learn the Hard Way is the third studio album by American country music artist Jordan Davis. It was released on August 15, 2025, via MCA Nashville.

== Touring ==
The album will be supported by the Ain't Enough Road Tour beginning in the fall of 2025.

== Critical reception ==
With respect to title track "Learn the Hard Way", 97.3 The Eagle states that "The Louisiana native’s signature vocals bring warmth and comfort to a delicate instrumental backdrop, as he flips the script and faces heartbreak for once", going on to say that "This time, instead of being the one to break the heart, like his character usually does, he getting left with the pain of someone else leaving".

When referring to "Bar None", The Garnette Report indicated "The song opens with a breezy rhythm and the all-too-familiar acoustic strings institute the country backdrop" and that "Constant bass and sparky drums complement Davis’s rich vocals, adding vibrancy while emphasizing the singer’s romantic angst".

== Track listing ==
Learn the Hard Way track listing
No.	Title	Writer(s)	Length
1.	"Her Way or the Highway"	Jordan Davis; Paul DiGiovanni; Travis Wood; Mark Holman; Josh Jenkins	2:52
2.	"Bar None"	Ben Johnson; Lydia Vaughan; Hunter Phelps	2:53
3.	"Mess with Missing You" (with Carly Pearce)	Jordan Davis; DiGiovanni; Hillary Lindsey; Wood	3:38
4.	"In Case You Missed It"	Jacob Davis; Jordan Davis; DiGiovanni; Wood	2:45
5.	"Ain't Enough Road"	Jordan Davis; Luke Dick; Ashley Gorley	2:59
6.	"Son of a Gun"	Jacob Davis; Jordan Davis; Josh Kerr; Lauren Hungate	2:55
7.	"Jesus Wouldn't Do"	Jacob Davis; Jordan Davis; J. Jenkins; Matt Jenkins	3:03
8.	"Learn the Hard Way"	DiGiovanni; Wood; John Pierce	2:48
9.	"I Ain't Sayin'"	Wood; Steve Moakler; Holman; Emily Reid	2:54
10.	"Good Gone Bad"	Jordan Davis; Matt Dragstrem; Chase McGill	2:57
11.	"Memory Don't Mess Around"	Jacob Davis; Jordan Davis; DiGiovanni; J. Jenkins; M. Jenkins	2:57
12.	"Keeping the World Away"	Jacob Davis; Jordan Davis; DiGiovanni; J. Jenkins; M. Jenkins	3:05
13.	"Know You Like That"	Ray Fulcher; Thomas Archer; Jordan Rowe; Michael Tyler	2:56
14.	"Only All the Time"	Jacob Davis; Jordan Davis; Wood; Holman; Matt Roy	2:46
15.	"Turn This Truck Around"	Jordan Davis; Devin Dawson; Jake Mitchell; Josh Thompson	3:24
16.	"Louisiana Stick" (with Marcus King)	Jordan Davis; DiGiovanni; McGill; Gorley	2:28
17.	"Muddy the Water"	Jordan Davis; DiGiovanni; J. Jenkins; M. Jenkins	3:09
Total length:			49:31

== Personnel ==
Credits adapted from the album's liner notes.

=== Musicians ===
- Jordan Davis – vocals (all tracks)
- Paul DiGiovanni – acoustic guitar (tracks 1, 3, 4, 8, 9, 11, 12, 16), programming (1–3, 7, 9, 12, 13, 15, 17), keyboards (1, 3, 5–8, 11, 12, 15, 17), background vocals (1–6, 8–10, 12, 13, 17), electric guitar (2–6, 8, 9, 12, 16, 17), Dobro guitar (4, 8), high-strung guitar (9)
- Nir Z – drum (1–7, 9, 10, 12–17)
- Alex Wright – keyboards (1–7, 9, 10, 12–17)
- Jimmie Sloas – bass (1, 3–7, 9, 10, 13–17)
- Ilya Toshinskiy – acoustic guitar (1–3, 5–7, 10, 12–15, 17), 12-string acoustic guitar (13)
- Trey Keller – background vocals (1, 2, 4–7, 10, 11, 13–15)
- Sol Philcox – electric guitar (1, 3, 7, 11, 14, 15, 17); bass, acoustic guitar (11)
- Derek Wells – electric guitar (2, 4–6, 9, 10, 12, 13, 16)
- Tony Lucido – bass (2, 12)
- Ben Johnson – programming (2)
- Carly Pearce – vocals (3)
- Bryan Sutton – acoustic guitar (4, 16)
- Justin Schipper – steel guitar (8)
- Josh Reedy – background vocals (8)
- Travis Wood – background vocals (8)
- Danny Rader – high-strung guitar (9), acoustic guitar (13)
- Matt Dragstrem – programming (10)
- Marcus King – electric guitar, background vocals (16)
- Katie DiGiovanni – background vocals (16)

=== Technical ===
- Paul DiGiovanni – production, additional recording
- Jim Cooley – recording, mixing
- Kam Luchterhand – recording, recording assistance
- Sol Philcox – recording
- Jake Butler – recording
- Zach Wills – recording assistance
- Zach Kulhman – recording assistance
- Trey Keller – additional recording
- Josh Reedy – additional recording
- Ben Johnson – additional recording
- Dave Clauss – additional recording
- Mike "Frog" Griffith – production management
- Rose Hutcheson – production management
- Randy Merrill – mastering

== Charts ==
=== Weekly charts ===
Weekly chart performance for Learn the Hard Way
Chart (2025)	Peak position
Australian Albums (ARIA)	9
Australian Country Albums (ARIA)	2
Canadian Albums (Billboard)	59
Scottish Albums (OCC)	9
UK Albums (OCC)	25
UK Country Albums (OCC)	1
US Billboard 200	32
US Top Country Albums (Billboard)	6

=== Year-end charts ===
Year-end chart performance for Learn the Hard Way
Chart (2025)	Position
US Top Country Albums (Billboard)	69
