= Tucson Too Late =

Single by Jordan Davis

from the album Bluebird Days
- Released: August 21, 2023
- Genre: Country
- Length: 2:52
- Label: MCA Nashville
- Songwriters: Jordan Davis; Jacob Davis; Josh Jenkins; Matt Jenkins
- Producer: Paul DiGiovanni

Jordan Davis singles chronology
"Next Thing You Know" (2023)	"Tucson Too Late" (2023)	"I Ain't Sayin'" (2024)

"Tucson Too Late" is a song by American country music singer Jordan Davis. It was released on August 21, 2023, as the fourth single from Davis's second studio album Bluebird Days.

== Content ==
Jordan Davis told Billboard writer Tom Roland that he wanted to create a song that evoked country music of the 1990s, as well as Keith Whitley's "Miami, My Amy".

Davis's brother Jacob had originally conceived the song as "Tulane Too Late", making wordplay on Tulane University and a two-lane road. They began working on the song together with Matt Jenkins and his brother Josh while Jordan was on tour. Josh composed the melody using a nylon-string guitar, on which he played several minor chords and a five-note riff. The four writers then presented a demo to producer Paul DiGiovanni. The final recording of the song includes Derek Wells and Ilya Toshinsky on guitar, Jimmie Lee Sloas on bass guitar, Nir Z on drums, and Alex Wright on keyboards. Vocalist Trey Keller also contributes thirteen different backing vocal tracks.

== Charts ==
=== Weekly charts ===
Weekly chart performance
Chart (2023–2024)	Peak position
Canada Country (Billboard)	2
US Billboard Hot 100	71
US Country Airplay (Billboard)	1
US Hot Country Songs (Billboard)	13

=== Year-end charts ===
Annual chart rankings
Chart (2024)	Position
US Country Airplay (Billboard)	10
US Hot Country Songs (Billboard)	54
US Radio Songs (Billboard)	51

== Certifications ==
Certifications for "Tucson Too Late"
Region	Certification	Certified units/sales
Canada (Music Canada)	Gold	40,000^{‡}
United States (RIAA)	Gold	500,000^{‡}
^{‡} Sales+streaming figures based on certification alone.
