= Out of My Hands =

Out of My Hands may refer to:

- Out of My Hands (Green River Ordinance album)
- Out of My Hands (Jennifer Rush album)
- Out of My Hands (Keisha White album)
- Out of My Hands (Morten Harket album)
- "Out of My Hands" (song), a 2010 song by Jars of Clay
- "Out of My Hands", a song by Dionne Warwick from the 1979 album Dionne
- "Out of My Hands", a song by Died Pretty from the 1988 album Lost
- "Out of My Hands", a song by The Buzzhorn from the 2002 album Disconnected
- "Out of My Hands", a song by The Donnas from the 2004 album Gold Medal
- "Out of My Hands", a song by Dave Matthews Band from the 2005 album Stand Up
- "Out Of My Hands", a song by Future and Metro Boomin from the 2024 album We Still Don't Trust You
- "Out of My Hands", a song by Milow
- Out of My Hand (film), a 2015 American film
