= The Morning Passengers EP =

EP by Green River Ordinance
- Released: September 6, 2010
- Genre: Alternative rock
- Length: 27:40
- Producers: Jordan Critz, Green River Ordinance

The Morning Passengers EP is the acoustic sessions album recorded and produced by Green River Ordinance. GRO returns to their Texas roots by opening with folky strumming and picking on this brand new acoustic soundtrack. This in combination with rootsy gear like harmonica, banjo, mandolin and warm tones from an old Hammond organ allow GRO to create some raw, acoustic tones that customers have loved.

== Track list ==
1. "Dancing Shoes"
2. "Uncertainly Uncertain"
3. "Undertow"
4. "Inward Tide"
5. "Out of the Storm"
6. "Where the West Wind Blows"

== Charts ==
Chart (2010)	Peak position
US Independent Albums (Billboard)	39
US Heatseekers Albums (Billboard)	3
