= I Ain't Sayin' =

2024 single by Jordan Davis

Single by Jordan Davis

from the album Learn the Hard Way
- Released: July 26, 2024
- Recorded: 2024
- Studio: Sound Stage Studio (Nashville, Tennessee)
- Genre: Country pop
- Length: 2:54
- Label: MCA Nashville
- Songwriters: Travis Wood; Steve Moakler; Mark Holman; Emily Reid
- Producer: Paul DiGiovanni

Jordan Davis singles chronology
"Tucson Too Late" (2023)	"I Ain't Sayin'" (2024)	"Bar None" (2025)

Music video
- "I Ain't Sayin'" on YouTube

"I Ain't Sayin'" is a song by American country pop singer Jordan Davis. It was released on July 26, 2024, as the lead single from his third studio album, Learn the Hard Way. The song was written by Travis Wood, Steve Moakler, Mark Holman and Emily Reid, and produced by Paul DiGiovanni.

== Background ==
The song was crafted on May 25, 2024, on the final day of a writing retreat in Livingston, Montana hosted by Jordan Davis, who invited songwriters Travis Wood, Mark Holman and Steve Moakler. Holman and Wood worked on the song in a separate building from the others. Holman developed the song from one of the tracks he created prior to the trip, which was built around some hand claps and a buzzy acoustic guitar. Wood had already composed a chorus with Los Angeles-based Canadian songwriter Emily Reid; they had briefly delayed their composition of the song after writing the line "I'm here and he's MIA", which they thought had a lot of potential. Wood FaceTimed Reid, who was in Los Angeles, for her opinion on pairing the chorus with the first verse and earned her approval. Holman quickly recorded a demo with Wood, who had writer-producer Paul DiGiovanni play it for Davis. He recalled, "Jordan was pretty effusive about it, but I didn't know if he was just being polite. When we hit that miss/misses line, he turned around and looked at me after that line. So I was like, 'I think he likes it.'"

The next week, Davis, DiGiovanni and a studio band recorded the track at Sound Stage Studios in Nashville, Tennessee with drummer Nir Z sharing duties with the programmed percussion. During the overdubbing process, DiGiovanni added a Spanish guitar in the background, steel-sounding guitar parts and a Southern rock-like twin guitar break. According to Davis, "We never made a lyric change, we never made a melody change. We dropped the key a half step from the original demo, maybe we bumped the [beats per minute] down a couple. But other than that, it was basically taking Mark's demo and letting Paul kind of pepper in his touch on it."

Reid's original idea for the title was "He Sure As Hell Ain't", which became the closing line of the chorus that she and Wood had started. The songwriting team debated using the phrase as the title, but later settled on "I Ain't Sayin'" to avoid usage of the word "hell".

After Davis teased the song for about a month through brief snippets, it was released to country radio by MCA Nashville via PlayMPE on July 24, 2024 and released to streaming services two days later.

An alternate country-rock version of the song was released on February 28, 2025.

== Content ==
"I Ain't Sayin'" is an upbeat song that depicts a woman whose partner falls short. Jordan Davis sings from the perspective of a man observing her troubles. In the opening verse, he sees the woman waiting for her date at the bar and having bought a beer for him as well, only for her date to never arrive. The man admits in the chorus that he is not perfect but can certainly be a better partner. In the second verse, he attempts to comfort the woman and inspire hope, offering to give her "move on somewhere to go".

== Music video ==
An official music video was released on October 17, 2024. Directed by Caleb Cockrell and filmed in Charleston, South Carolina, it shows Jordan Davis and his friends partying with boating, barbecues in the backyard and drinks as well as the breakdown of one of his female friends' romantic relationships. After walking away from her boyfriend, the woman joins Davis and his crew in their celebration.

== Live performances ==
On October 30, 2024, Jordan Davis performed the song on The Kelly Clarkson Show.

== Charts ==
=== Weekly charts ===
Weekly chart performance for "I Ain't Sayin'"
Chart (2024–2025)	Peak position
Australia Country Hot 50 (The Music)	6
Canada Hot 100 (Billboard)	63
Canada All-Format Airplay (Billboard)	8
Canada Country (Billboard)	1
US Billboard Hot 100	58
US Country Airplay (Billboard)	2
US Hot Country Songs (Billboard)	12

=== Year-end charts ===
Year-end chart performance for "I Ain't Sayin'"
Chart (2025)	Position
US Country Airplay (Billboard)	24
US Hot Country Songs (Billboard)	38

== Certifications ==
Certifications for "I Ain't Sayin'"
Region	Certification	Certified units/sales
Australia (ARIA)	Gold	35,000^{‡}
United States (RIAA)	Gold	500,000^{‡}
^{‡} Sales+streaming figures based on certification alone.
