= Slow Dance in a Parking Lot =

Single by Jordan Davis

from the album Home State
- Released: April 22, 2019
- Genre: Country
- Length: 3:13
- Label: MCA Nashville
- Songwriters: Jordan Davis; Lonnie Fowler
- Producer: Paul DiGiovanni

Jordan Davis singles chronology
"Take It from Me" (2018)	"Slow Dance in a Parking Lot" (2019)	"Almost Maybes" (2020)

"Slow Dance in a Parking Lot" is a song co-written and recorded by American country music singer Jordan Davis. It was released in April 2019 as the third and final single from Davis's debut album Home State (2018). Davis wrote the song with Lonnie Fowler, who came up with the idea after slow dancing with his wife on their first date. "Slow Dance in a Parking Lot" gave Davis his second number one hit on the Billboard Country Airplay chart. It also peaked at numbers six and 37 on both the Hot Country Songs and Hot 100 charts respectively. It was Davis' first top 40 hit on the Hot 100. The song was certified Platinum by the Recording Industry Association of America (RIAA), and has sold 53,000 copies in the United States as of March 2020. It also charted in Canada, reaching number 15 on the Canada Country chart. It received a double platinum certification from Music Canada, denoting sales of over 160,000 units in that country. An accompanying music video for the song, directed by Patrick Tracy, revolves around the life of a young man and is filmed in various parking lots around Gallatin, Tennessee.

== Content ==
According to Davis, the idea from the song came from his friend and co-writer Lonnie Fowler, who recalled slow-dancing to country music while on his first date with his wife. Davis said that it "is the definition of a country song" due to it storytelling and short length.

== Commercial performance ==
"Slow Dance in a Parking Lot" debuted at number 51 on the Country Airplay chart the week of May 4, 2019. It peaked at number one the week of April 11, 2020 and stayed on the chart for 51 weeks. On the week of August 3, it debuted at number 50 on the Hot Country Songs chart. It reached number six on the same week it peaked atop the Hot Country Songs chart, and remained there for 38 weeks. On the Billboard Hot 100, it debuted at number 99 the week of January 11, 2020, moved two spots to number 97 the following week before dropping back to its debut position the next week and leaving afterwards. It reappeared at number 84 the week of February 8 and peaked at number 37 ten weeks later, remaining on the chart for nineteen weeks. On June 3, 2021, "Slow Dance in a Parking Lot" was certified platinum by the RIAA in the US, for combined sales and streams of over a million units. The song has sold 53,000 copies in the United States as of March 2020.

In Canada, the track debuted at number 50 on the Canada Country chart the week of October 12, 2019. It peaked at number 15 the same week it reached the top 40 of the Billboard Hot 100, and remained on the chart for 30 weeks. It was certified gold by Music Canada in Canada on March 16, 2021, denoting sales of over 80,000 units.

== Music video ==
Davis debuted the video in July 2019. The video, directed by Patrick Tracy, features various nostalgic events in the life of a young man. Davis's wife, Kristen, appears in the video. Various parking lots throughout Gallatin, Tennessee are featured, as Davis felt that the city reflected the "universal" theme of the song.

== Charts ==
=== Weekly charts ===
Chart (2019–2020)	Peak position
Canada Country (Billboard)	15
US Billboard Hot 100	37
US Country Airplay (Billboard)	1
US Hot Country Songs (Billboard)	6

=== Year-end charts ===
Chart (2019)	Position
US Hot Country Songs (Billboard)	86

Chart (2020)	Position
US Country Airplay (Billboard)	26
US Hot Country Songs (Billboard)	31

== Certifications ==
Region	Certification	Certified units/sales
Australia (ARIA)	Platinum	70,000^{‡}
Canada (Music Canada)	2× Platinum	160,000^{‡}
New Zealand (RMNZ)	Gold	15,000^{‡}
United States (RIAA)	3× Platinum	3,000,000^{‡}
^{‡} Sales+streaming figures based on certification alone.
