= Turn This Truck Around =

2025 single by Jordan Davis

Single by Jordan Davis

from the album Learn the Hard Way
- Released: October 27, 2025
- Genre: Country
- Length: 3:24
- Label: MCA Nashville
- Songwriters: Jordan Davis; Devin Dawson; Jake Mitchell; Josh Thompson
- Producer: Paul DiGiovanni

Jordan Davis singles chronology
"Ain't a Bad Life" (2025)	"Turn This Truck Around" (2025)	"Mess" (2026)

"Turn This Truck Around" is a song by American country music singer Jordan Davis. First released on July 25, 2025, as a promotional single, it was sent to country radio on October 27, 2025, as the third single from his third studio album, Learn the Hard Way (2024). The song was written by Davis himself, Devin Dawson, Jake Mitchell and Josh Thompson and produced by Paul DiGiovanni.

== Background ==
The song's four writers commuted to the Anthem Entertainment in Nashville, Tennessee on December 7, 2024, where they worked on the song. It was inspired by their experiences with family trips; Devin Dawson, in particular, recounted a trip to the Six Flags theme park in Vallejo, California with his twin brother, writer-producer Jacob Durrett, during which their mother threatened to turn the car around if they misbehaved. Jake Mitchell introduced a pulsing track based on a simple chord progression, leading to discussion about driving imagery in connection to the driving beat. Dawson brought up their earlier conversation and came up with the phrase "Turn This Truck Around". They composed the chorus melody first, with Josh Thompson providing the setup line, "Girl, long as your memory / Don't make me turn this truck around". The writers crafted the starting line for the song as Jordan Davis wanted, and worked on the chorus again before developing the story of the song.

Mitchell produced the demo. He inserted sound effects of a door slamming, boots walking and an ignition starting, but none of these features were used in the final version. At Dawson's suggestion, he employed a half-time feel on the bridge. Mitchell ensured that the elements in the recording would appeal to those who decide whether the song should be recorded professionally. Davis recorded his vocals within 20 minutes, in contrast to a typical session that took two hours.

Davis debuted the song live at the Tortuga Music Festival in Fort Lauderdale, Florida on April 5, 2025. Due to the audience's favorable response, he decided to release it as a single. MCA Nashville released the song to country radio via PlayMPE on October 13, 2025. Davis has also stated it is probably his favorite song from Learn the Hard Way.

== Composition ==
The song contains Southern rock elements and has been compared to the style of Tom Petty. It features background voices, as well as quiet, filtered-out synths at the end of the choruses and a barely audible pulse synthesizer and Hammond B-3 at the bridge's conclusion. In the lyrics, the protagonist is determined to drive as far away as possible from his past lover, indicating their relationship had been strained for some time. He describes his journey on the highway in the first verse, while in the chorus he asks his ex-partner to keep her distance from him, wanting to avoid returning to the relationship. The second verse finds him resisting such temptations as he hears love songs on the radio. The tension is brought to a climax during the bridge.

== Charts ==
Chart performance for "Turn This Truck Around"
Chart (2025–2026)	Peak position
Canada Hot 100 (Billboard)	60
Canada Country (Billboard)	1
US Billboard Hot 100	57
US Country Airplay (Billboard)	2
US Hot Country Songs (Billboard)	11
