= Buy Dirt =

2021 single by Jordan Davis and Luke Bryan

Single by Jordan Davis and Luke Bryan

from the album Bluebird Days
- Released: July 19, 2021
- Genre: Country
- Length: 2:47
- Label: MCA Nashville
- Songwriter(s): Jacob Davis; Jordan Davis; Josh Jenkins; Matt Jenkins
- Producer(s): Paul DiGiovanni

Jordan Davis singles chronology
"Almost Maybes" (2020)	"Buy Dirt" (2021)	"What My World Spins Around" (2022)

Luke Bryan singles chronology
"Waves" (2021)	"Buy Dirt" (2021)	"Up" (2021)

Music video
- "Buy Dirt" on YouTube

"Buy Dirt" is a song by American country music singers Jordan Davis and Luke Bryan. It was released on July 19, 2021 as the lead single from Davis' second studio album Bluebird Days. Davis co-wrote the song with his brother Jacob, Josh Jenkins, and Matt Jenkins (the latter two of whom are also brothers), while Paul DiGiovanni produced it. The record label is MCA Nashville. It won the Country Music Association Award for Song of the Year at the 56th Annual Country Music Association Awards.

== Background ==
Davis and Bryan met at an awards show and later became friends. Davis told Sounds Like Nashville: "Luke isn't just a great entertainer; he's a great Dad, a great husband, and a great friend, too. That's what 'Buy Dirt' embodies. When I wrote 'Buy Dirt,' I knew he could relate to the song's message. [...] I left him a text message with the song attached and told him how much it meant to me. He got right back to me within a couple minutes and said he loved it. He wanted to live with it, make sure he would be right for the song. He called me a week later and said yes. He's one of busiest guys out there and for him to be part of it speaks for the song."

== Content ==
Davis described the song on Today's Country Radio with Kelleigh Bannen: "'Buy Dirt' to me is about faith, family and friends, and really finding your happiness."

== Critical reception ==
Billy Dukes of Taste of Country commented that "Buy Dirt" "paint[s] a full picture of country life and sagacity [... ,] which helps make it real to the rest of us".

== Music video ==
The music video was released on August 10, 2021. Davis alongside Bryan illustrate the story behind the "poignant" song.

== Live performance ==
On June 1, 2021, Davis and Bryan performed "Buy Dirt" on The Today Show.

== Charts ==
=== Weekly charts ===
Weekly chart performance for "Buy Dirt"
Chart (2021–2022)	Peak position
Australia Country Hot 50 (TMN)	12
Canada (Canadian Hot 100)	23
Canada Country (Billboard)	1
Global 200 (Billboard)	117
US Billboard Hot 100	22
US Country Airplay (Billboard)	1
US Hot Country Songs (Billboard)	1

=== Year-end charts ===
2021 year-end chart performance for "Buy Dirt"
Chart (2021)	Position
US Hot Country Songs (Billboard)	41

2022 year-end chart performance for "Buy Dirt"
Chart (2022)	Position
Canada (Canadian Hot 100)	68
US Billboard Hot 100	49
US Country Airplay (Billboard)	30
US Hot Country Songs (Billboard)	9

== Certifications ==
Certifications for "Buy Dirt"
Region	Certification	Certified units/sales
Australia (ARIA)	4× Platinum	280,000^{‡}
Canada (Music Canada)	8× Platinum	640,000^{‡}
United Kingdom (BPI)	Silver	200,000^{‡}
United States (RIAA)	5× Platinum	5,000,000^{‡}
^{‡} Sales+streaming figures based on certification alone.
