= Bar None (song) =

2025 single by Jordan Davis

Single by Jordan Davis

from the album Learn the Hard Way
- Released: March 28, 2025
- Genre: Country
- Length: 2:53
- Label: MCA Nashville
- Songwriters: Ben Johnson; Lydia Vaughan; Hunter Phelps
- Producer: Paul DiGiovanni

Jordan Davis singles chronology
"I Ain't Sayin'" (2024)	"Bar None" (2025)	"Ain't a Bad Life" (2025)

"Bar None" is a song by American country music singer Jordan Davis, released on March 28, 2025, as the second single from his third studio album, Learn the Hard Way (2025). It was written by Ben Johnson, Lydia Vaughan and Hunter Phelps and produced by Paul DiGiovanni.

== Background and composition ==
Lydia Vaughan first considered "Bar None" as a title when she heard the phrase in a conversation. She also conceived an idea to use it to refer to keeping score, as an example of wordplay. During a writing session with Ben Johnson and Hunter Phelps at the Skyline Studio in Nashville, Tennessee in the summer of 2024, Vaughan introduced the idea to her co-writers. Phelps was unfamiliar with the expression, so they debated for around 20 minutes about the familiarity of "bar none". Phelps texted his wife, who confirmed "bar none" to be a widely recognized phrase, after which they moved forward. Johnson developed fast-paced stomp-clap percussion and a cascading guitar riff that serves as an instrumental passage for the intro and became a signature sound for the song. He slowed down the track by 20 beats per minute and played it slowly, before speeding it up again. Johnson noted that the guitar sounded like a mandolin or banjo and gave the section a "cool, warbly effect". The song was composed such that it sonically produced a more lighthearted atmosphere, juxtaposing with the song's story about a man drowning his sorrows. The writers used internal rhymes and alliteration for playfulness and unintentionally inserted sports-themed lyrics into the middle of the chorus, referring to a figurative scoreboard for the character's heartache, to enhance it as the chorus was previously based on only three notes. When they recorded the demo, Phelps was chosen as the singer and performed in a style moderately similar to that of the Lumineers.

Around the time that the song was written, Jordan Davis appeared in an episode of CMT Crossroads with the band Needtobreathe and subsequently attempted to write music that mirrored their core sound, especially regarding the stomp-clap style. When he received the demo of "Bar None", Davis decided to record the song. He related the song to his memories of playing baseball in high school and losing a lot. Davis had finished most of Learn the Hard Way, but convinced MCA Nashville to let him record four more songs for the album, including "Bar None". Producer Paul DiGiovanni booked a session at Nashville's Sound Stage with drummer Nir Z, bassist Jimmie Lee Sloas, guitarists Ilya Toshinskiy (of Bering Strait) and Derek Wells, and keyboardist Alex Wright. They slightly lowered the key of the song to make it easier to sing the high notes of the "scoreboard" line. Nir Z loosened the wires of his snare drum to eliminate some of the fuzz in the production, while Toshinskiy complemented the background with a variety of stringed instruments, such as mandolin, banjo and bouzouki. Trey Keller provided background vocals, singing 20 different harmony parts, some of which were blended with the instrumental riff to create a dreamy effect in the middle of the song.

Davis previewed the song at the Country Radio Seminar in February 2025. He initially did not think he should release it as a single, but everyone else in his team supported the idea. MCA Nashville sent the song to country radio on March 24, 2025, four days before it was released to streaming services.

An alternate version of the song was released on October 10, 2025.

== Content ==
Lyrically, the song finds a man coping with his emotional pain from a breakup by drinking at a bar. He regards his ex-partner as "the best thing I ever had" and compares his unsuccessful attempts to forget about her to a losing sports game, imagining the bottles in the back bar as his teammates.

== Music video ==
The music video was released on July 9, 2025 and was directed by Patrick Tracy.

== Charts ==
=== Weekly charts ===
Weekly chart performance for "Bar None"
Chart (2025)	Peak position
Australia Country Hot 50 (The Music)	1
Canada Hot 100 (Billboard)	38
Canada Country (Billboard)	1
US Billboard Hot 100	37
US Country Airplay (Billboard)	2
US Hot Country Songs (Billboard)	6

=== Year-end charts ===
Year-end chart performance for "Bar None"
Chart (2025)	Position
US Country Airplay (Billboard)	33
US Hot Country Songs (Billboard)	33
