= Green River Ordinance =

American rock band

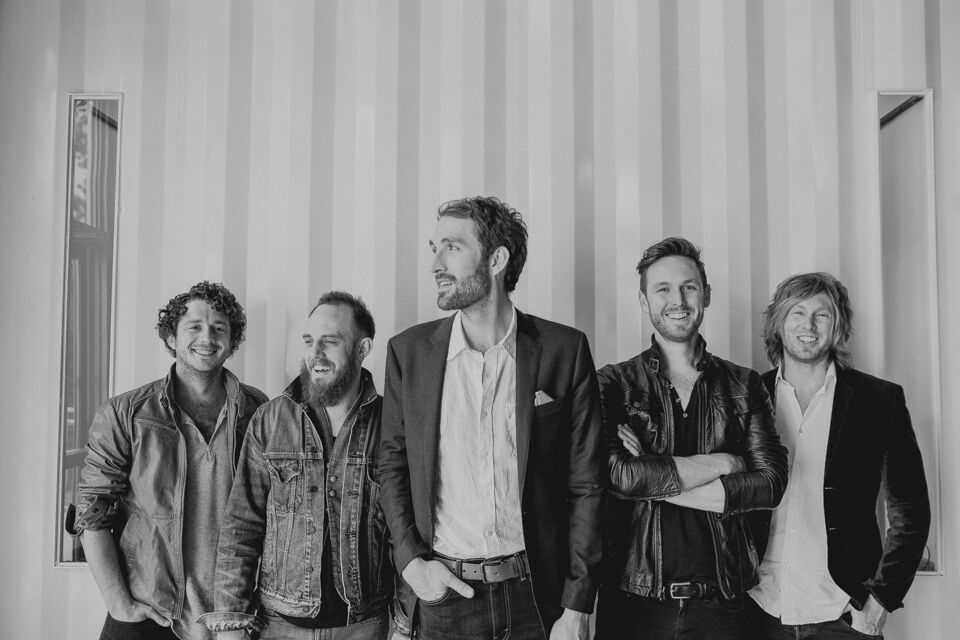

Background information
- Also known as: Green River Ordinances
- Origin: Fort Worth, Texas, United States
- Genres: Pop rock, rock, country, folk, americana
- Years active: 2000–present
- Label: Residence Music
- Members: Josh Jenkins; Geoff Ice; Denton Hunker; Joshua Wilkerson; Jamey Ice
- Website: www.greenriverordinance.com

Green River Ordinance is an American rock band from Fort Worth, Texas, United States. Their name refers to Green River Ordinances, laws which prohibit door-to-door sales unless the house's owner gives permission to do so.

== History ==
=== Early years ===
Bassist Geoff Ice and guitarist Jamey Ice are brothers. Early in their career (circa 2003), the band regularly did opening gigs with Flickerstick in Texas, and by 2005 had toured with Collective Soul and played with Eisley and Mutemath, among others. The band's initial releases, a 2005 full-length and a 2007 EP, were both released on the small independent label For Mona. Their debut release for Virgin Records, Out of My Hands, was released in February 2009, and garnered comparisons to 1990s mainstream rock acts such as Sister Hazel, Third Eye Blind and Matchbox 20, as well as contemporaries like Augustana and The Fray. Out of My Hands peaked at No. 10 on the Billboard Heatseekers chart. The single "Come On" reached No. 17 on the Billboard Adult Top 40 late in 2009; the single "On Your Own" reached No. 37 on the same chart in 2010.

=== 2009 and 2010 ===
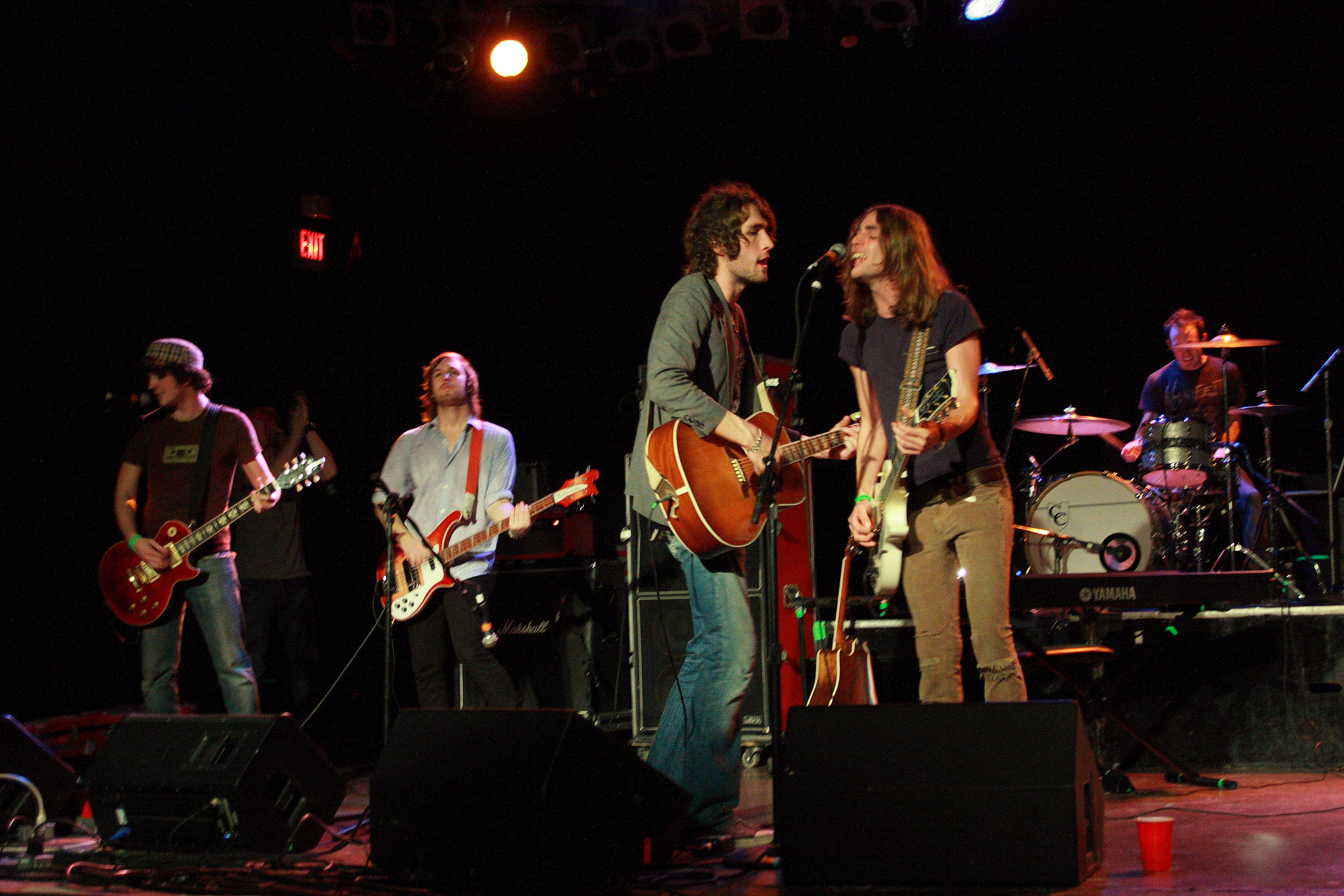
Green River Ordinance performing in 2009

In 2009 and 2010, GRO saw two Top 40 radio singles, songs on over 20 television shows ("So You Think You Can Dance", "The Hills", "The Young and the Restless"), two music videos on MTV and VH1, as well as tours with several nationally touring artists, such as Goo Goo Dolls, Collective Soul, Switchfoot, Train, Lifehouse, and American Idol winners David Cook & Kris Allen. Billboard Magazine even stated, "Green River Ordinance has established itself as a pop-rock act to keep an eye on in 2010." GRO's original song "Rise Up" was featured on the AT&T Team USA Soundtrack (2010) alongside Mariah Carey, 3 Doors Down, Train, and Rascal Flatts. Their Capitol/Virgin Records debut album Out of My Hands and various singles were featured on Zune, Walmart.com, AmazonMP3, iTunes, Rhapsody, and Napster as Staff Picks, Song of the Day, What’s Hot, Track of the Week, and other promotions.

GRO left EMI on August 6, 2010 and 14 days later proceeded to go on tour with Goo Goo Dolls and Switchfoot. Also, they were featured on every episode of MTV's show "If You Really Knew Me" and also had their video "On Your Own" featured after shows during credits on MTV, all of this while being independent of any label ties. On September 6, 2010, GRO released "The Morning Passengers - Acoustic Sessions EP" to iTunes only, and it reached No 3 on the Billboard Heatseekers Chart, as well as the No. 39 on Billboard Independent Albums.

=== 2011 ===
After leaving EMI, GRO turned to Kickstarter to raise over $40,000 from their fans in order to produce a new album. While recording the new album, amidst touring, they released two additional EPs: Songs We Like From Before We Were Born and Waterhope.

=== 2012–2014 ===
The band released their third studio album, Under Fire, on February 28, 2012. They began a national tour, "Under Fire - The North American Tour," on March 29, 2012 in support of album, with Graham Colton as their opener. The album was fully funded by their fans, through the launch of a Kickstarter campaign over a year earlier. The album features the hit Texas Country song, "Dancing Shoes," as well as "Heart of Me."

=== 2015–present ===
On September 23, 2015, the band announced that their fourth full-length studio album, Fifteen, would be released on January 22, 2016, through Residence Music.

== Charity work ==
In April 2010, Green River Ordinance launched their own charity site, in order to help make a difference for those less fortunate. Through this site, Green River Ordinance offers ten songs for purchase and information on five charities each member of the band picked. The consumer can select which of the songs they would like to purchase and select which band member's charity they would like their money to go toward. 100% of the proceeds go to the charity of the consumer's choice.

On October 8, 2010, International Justice Mission released the compilation album Freedom exclusively through Family Christian Stores as a joint effort to raise funds and awareness to end global slavery. Green River Ordinance is featured with their song "Don't Give Up." They are alongside the biggest names in contemporary Christian music and are one of the only secular artists on the compilation due to their zealous passion on the topic of slavery. 13,000 physical units were sold the first week in stores.

On October 15, 2010, Green River Ordinance was direct support for Bon Jovi in Gulf Shores, AL as part of the BP-sponsored concert series "Concerts for the Coast," done in hopes of attracting tourists to the region in the off-season during the oil spill recovery. There were 37,000+ people in attendance.

== Members ==
- Josh Jenkins - vocals, guitar, and piano
- Geoff Ice - bass and background vocals
- Denton Hunker - drums
- Joshua Wilkerson - guitar and background vocals
- Jamey Ice - lead guitar, mandolin, and banjo

== Discography ==
=== Studio albums ===
Title	Album details	Peak chart positions				
Title	Album details	US	US Heat	US Rock	US Indie	US Folk
The Beauty of Letting Go	Released: 2005; Label: Self-released	—	—	—	—	—
Out of My Hands	Released: February 24, 2009; Label: Virgin Records	—	10	—	—	—
Under Fire	Released: February 28, 2012; Label: Self-released	98	—	24	14	—
Fifteen	Released: January 22, 2016; Label: Residence Music	103	—	8	5	1
"—" denotes releases that did not chart.

=== Live albums ===
- The Collection: Live & Unplugged (2014)

=== Extended plays ===
Title	Album details	Peak chart positions				
Title	Album details	US	US Heat	US Rock	US Indie	US Folk
Way Back Home	Released: May 28, 2007; Label: Self-released	—	—	—	—	—
Wait a Minute	Released: August 10, 2010; Label: Self-released	—	—	—	—	—
The Morning Passengers EP	Released: September 6, 2010; Label: Self-released	—	3	—	39	—
Songs We Like from Before We Were Born	Released: April 6, 2011; Label: Self-released	—	—	—	—	—
A Green River Ordinance Christmas	Released: November 15, 2011; Label: Self-released	—	—	—	—	—
Chasing Down the Wind	Released: June 18, 2013; Label: Self-released	94	—	28	21	6
"—" denotes releases that did not chart.

=== Singles ===
- 2009: "Come On"
- 2010: "Rise Up" (non-album single) featured on 2010 Winter Olympics' AT&T Team USA Soundtrack album
- 2010: "Don't Give Up" (non-album single) featured on International Justice Mission's charity album Freedom
- 2010: "On Your Own"
- 2011: "Water Hope"
- 2012: "Heart of Me"
- 2015: "Red Fire Night
- 2016: "Simple Life"
- 2024: "For Old Times' Sake"
