= Next Thing You Know (song) =

Single by Jordan Davis

from the album Bluebird Days
- Released: August 12, 2022
- Genre: Country
- Length: 2:55
- Label: MCA Nashville
- Songwriters: Jordan Davis; Chase McGill; Greylan James; Josh Osborne
- Producer: Paul DiGiovanni

Jordan Davis singles chronology
"What My World Spins Around" (2022)	"Next Thing You Know" (2022)	"Tucson Too Late" (2023)

"Next Thing You Know" is a song co-written and recorded by American country music singer Jordan Davis. It was released on August 12, 2022, as the third single from his second studio album Bluebird Days. Davis wrote the song with Chase McGill, Greylan James, and Josh Osborne.

It was nominated for the Country Music Association Award for Single, Song and Video of the Year at the 57th Annual Country Music Association Awards.

== Content ==
Jordan Davis wrote the song with Josh Osborne, Greylan James, and Chase McGill at a songwriting session on June 14, 2022. McGill suggested the title, at which point Davis came up with the idea of using the title to show the progress of a romance, including a couple's first encounter, and then their marriage and having a child. When producing the recording, Paul DiGiovanni used a number of unconventional arrangements. Acoustic guitarist Ilya Toshinsky played the guitar parts twice, with one part on the song's left audio channel and the other on the right, and lead guitarist Derek Wells used a delay effect on his parts. In addition, drummer Nir Z played the snare drum with his bare hands and added a synthesized talking drum.

Due to demand from Davis's fans, "Next Thing You Know" was sent to country radio in February 2023, supplanting the label's original choice of "Tucson Too Late" as the album's third single.

== Music video ==
The music video for "Next Thing You Know" premiered on June 15, 2023. Directed by Running Bear, it was inspired by the films Blue Valentine and The Tree of Life and is set in three time periods depicting the life of a couple meeting, marrying, moving in together, having a daughter and growing old interspersed with clips of Davis performing the song. The end of the video features Davis and his own wife Kristen with their children.

It was nominated for the Country Music Association Award for Video of the Year.

== Charts ==
=== Weekly charts ===
Weekly chart performance for "Next Thing You Know"
Chart (2023)	Peak position
Canada Hot 100 (Billboard)	35
Canada Country (Billboard)	1
US Billboard Hot 100	23
US Country Airplay (Billboard)	2
US Hot Country Songs (Billboard)	7

=== Year-end charts ===
Year-end chart performance for "Next Thing You Know"
Chart (2023)	Position
Canada (Canadian Hot 100)	77
US Billboard Hot 100	47
US Country Airplay (Billboard)	9
US Hot Country Songs (Billboard)	16

== Certifications ==
Certifications for "Next Thing You Know"
Region	Certification	Certified units/sales
Australia (ARIA)	2× Platinum	140,000^{‡}
Canada (Music Canada)	3× Platinum	240,000^{‡}
New Zealand (RMNZ)	Gold	15,000^{‡}
United Kingdom (BPI)	Silver	200,000^{‡}
United States (RIAA)	3× Platinum	3,000,000^{‡}
^{‡} Sales+streaming figures based on certification alone.
