= Cool Anymore =

Promotional single by Jordan Davis featuring Julia Michaels

from the EP Jordan Davis
- Released: November 8, 2019
- Genre: Country pop
- Length: 3:20
- Label: MCA Nashville
- Songwriters: Ross Copperman; Jordan Davis; Nicolle Galyon; Julia Michaels; Emily Weisband
- Producer: Paul DiGiovanni

Jordan Davis chronology
"Trouble Town" (2019)	"Cool Anymore" (2019)	"Detours" (2020)

Julia Michaels chronology
If the World Was Ending (2019)	Cool Anymore (2019)	Heartless (2020)

Music video
- "Cool Anymore" on YouTube

"Cool Anymore" is a song by American country music singer Jordan Davis featuring American singer Julia Michaels. The song was released on November 8, 2019 and is an ode to getting to that comfortable stage in a relationship when you can let your guard down and stop worrying about trying to impress your love interest.

== Background ==
Davis and Michaels had written together four ago and Davis recalls Michaels being "so dialed into what she was doing." After writing this song with Nicolle Galyon, Emily Weisband and Ross Copperman, Davis thought he's like to record it as a duet and thought of Michaels. Davis told Rolling Stone "We sent it to Julia and said, 'Hey, do you want to be a part of this? I think it's who you are, and it would be killer'. When she sent it back, she had completely rewritten the second verse and made it totally unreal.". David said "It's 100% a Julia Michaels lyric, and it's awesome." Upon release, Davis said "I'm happy to have it out in the world. I love the message of it, love what it says, and I'm really happy Julia's on it." Michals added "It's just a fun, chill vibe that has a nice little groove to it and makes you smile and feel good. We're lucky to be able to go home and let loose with the ones we love."

== Music video ==
The music video was released on November 8, 2019. It was directed by Eric Ryan Anderson and filmed in an empty church. It finds the pair singing to each other and goofing off during a photo shoot.

== Reception ==
Chris Parton from Sounds Like Nashville said "it features the sonic swell of an epic romance in the making, anchored by crisp beats and soft-touch guitar riffs. Equally plush are the two artists' vocal back-and-forth, with each asking the other to drop the 'cool' exterior they show the world". Mike Wass from Idolator described it as "a love song about being accepted for who you really are, 'Cool Anymore' is destined to strike a chord with couples from Nashville to New York".

== Certifications ==
Region	Certification	Certified units/sales
Canada (Music Canada)	Gold	40,000^{‡}
United States (RIAA)	Gold	500,000^{‡}
^{‡} Sales+streaming figures based on certification alone.

== Release history ==
Region	Date	Format	Label	Ref.
Various	November 8, 2019	Digital download; streaming	MCA Nashville	
