= Ain't a Bad Life =

2025 single by Thomas Rhett featuring Jordan Davis

Single by Thomas Rhett featuring Jordan Davis

from the album About a Woman
- Released: September 22, 2025
- Genre: Country
- Length: 3:07
- Label: Valory
- Songwriters: Thomas Rhett; Mark Trussell; John Byron; Ashley Gorley; Blake Pendergrass
- Producers: Paul DiGiovanni; Mark Trussell

Thomas Rhett singles chronology
| "Nothing Else" (2025) | "Ain't a Bad Life" (2025) | "Be There in a Minute" (2026) |

Jordan Davis singles chronology
| "Bar None" (2025) | "Ain't a Bad Life" (2025) | "Turn This Truck Around" (2025) |

"Ain't a Bad Life" is a song by American country music singer Thomas Rhett featuring American country singer Jordan Davis. It was first released on July 18, 2025 as a promotional single, before being sent to country radio on September 22, 2025 as the lead single from the deluxe edition of Rhett's seventh studio album, About a Woman (2024). It was written by Rhett, Mark Trussell, John Byron, Ashley Gorley and Blake Pendergrass and produced by Paul DiGiovanni and Trussell.

== Background ==
On September 28, 2022, four songwriters flew to a Midwestern airport and met Thomas Rhett's tour bus for a show in Grand Forks, North Dakota on the next night. The song was inspired by their conversation about finding contentment in life. They began working on it after midnight, starting when Rhett introduced a chord progression similar to the style of "Fire and Rain" by James Taylor and sang a line that he had previously come up with: "Didn't win the lotto, but the Dawgs won". Others chimed in with more lines, and developed a verse from there. Mark Trussell took over the guitar parts and fed their ideas into a track on his laptop. Rhett and Ashley Gorley had a variety of melodies and they picked those that seemed to fit best together, even if they were unsure of where they would use them. After the first verse, the structure shifted into a series of fragmented phrases ("No I ain't… got it all… but I sure… got it made"), which changed the texture of the song. They decided it to be the chorus, although the phrases were unconventional for a chorus as they approached the downbeat rather than the start of a measure in an anthemic manner. Midway through the chorus, they mixed elongated "oo-oo-oo-oo" melodies with self-affirming lyrics. The writers stopped working on the song at some point—likely after the first verse and chorus—and moved on to other songs. They came back to it and finished it after Rhett's final show during the weekend, on October 1 in Sioux Falls, South Dakota.

After the trip, Trussell created a demo for the song. About three weeks later, they decided that the original intro sounded too much like "Fire and Rain", so Trussell reworked it around a twelve-string guitar. Rhett thought the song would work as a duet, but did not have a collaborator in mind, so it was not included on About a Woman. When a deluxe edition of the album was considered, Rhett revisited the song. He decided to collaborate with Jordan Davis, whom he had bonded with on a hunting trip, and had Trussell produce the final master, mostly following the arrangement established in the demo. Rhett recorded his vocal at home, while Trussell provided background vocals. Valory Music Co. released the song to country radio via PlayMPE on September 8, 2025.

== Composition ==
The song contains guitar, drums, bass and keyboards. Lyrically, it is about gratitude for what one has in life. The narrator explains that although his personal luck is not at its highest point, he still has much to appreciate. He lists them off, including an unremarkable but dependable truck, his homestead, his romantic partner, shared moments of drinking Jack Daniel's with her, and a supportive community that includes a preacher whom he can confide in. He highlights that his life is not perfect and he still faces problems, but he reminds himself to thank God for all the good in life.

== Charts ==
Chart performance for "Ain't a Bad Life"
| Chart (2025–2026) | Peak position |
|---|---|
| Canada Hot 100 (Billboard) | 88 |
| Canada Country (Billboard) | 3 |
| US Billboard Hot 100 | 53 |
| US Country Airplay (Billboard) | 2 |
| US Hot Country Songs (Billboard) | 14 |
