= Hard iced tea =

Alcoholic beverage made from tea

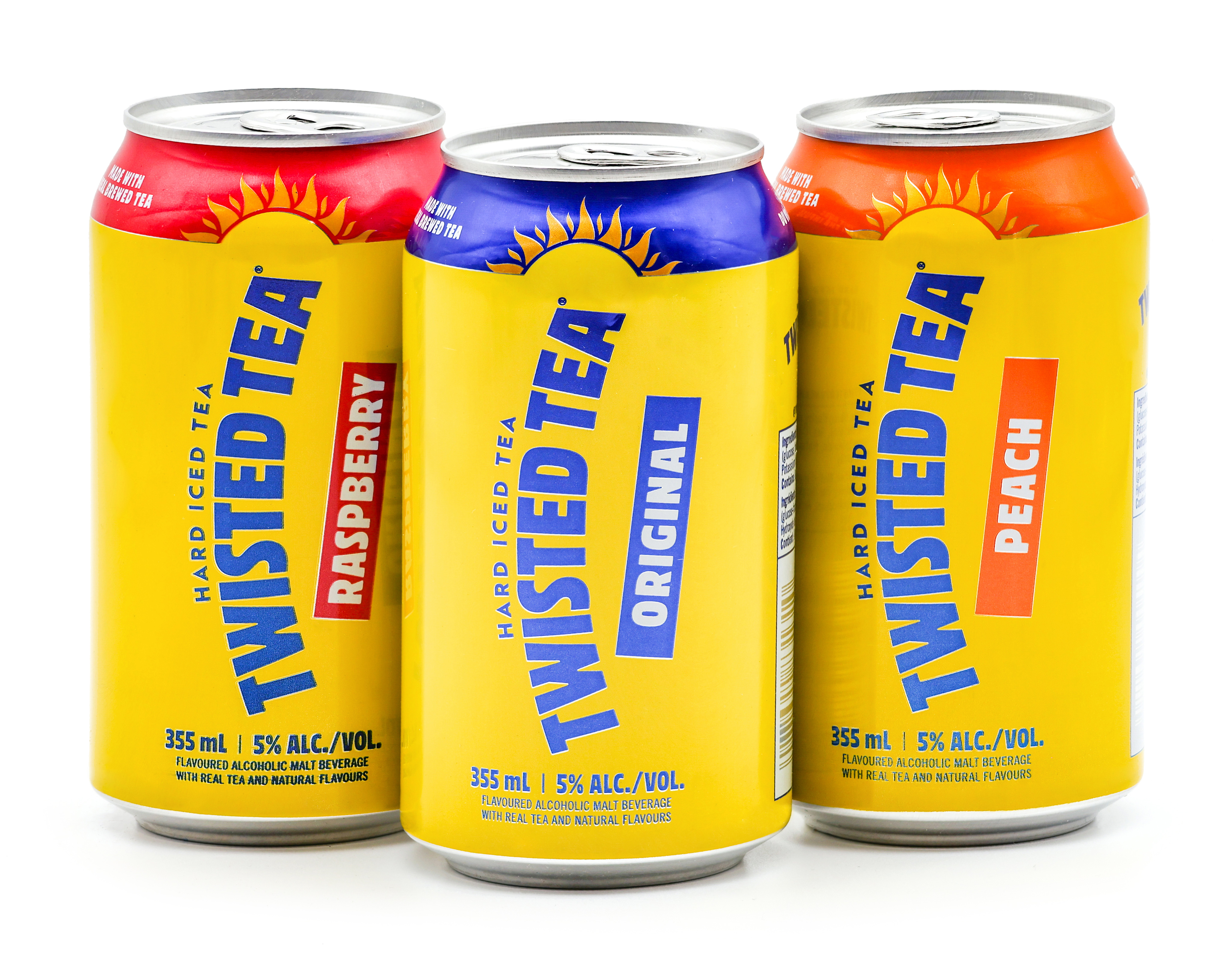
Assorted flavors of Twisted Tea, the first commercially successful retail hard iced tea

Hard iced tea is a caffeinated alcoholic beverage made by blending brewed tea (typically black tea) with alcohol, sweeteners, and often fruit flavorings. Unlike spiked seltzers or malt beverages, hard iced tea retains the brewed tea's tannins and flavor profile while delivering mild-to-moderate alcohol by volume (ABV), typically ranging from 4% to 8%.

== History ==
Hard iced tea originated in the United States in the early 2000s as part of a broader movement toward flavored malt beverages (FMBs). The genre's commercial breakthrough came with the 2001 national launch of Twisted Tea by the Boston Beer Company, which marketed the product as a hard alternative to soda-based coolers, inspired by Southern sweet tea culture and summer refreshment preferences.

A viral advertising campaign in 2006, titled "Tea Partay," also helped increase national awareness of the category.

== Ingredients and preparation ==
Most hard iced teas are brewed using black tea concentrate, sweeteners (such as cane sugar or corn syrup), natural flavorings (e.g., lemon or peach), and alcohol derived from either malt, vodka, or fermented sugar. The beverage is typically carbonated and served chilled.

== Notable brands ==
The category's growth led to a range of domestic and international offerings:

- Twisted Tea – A market leader in the U.S. since 2001, offering multiple flavors including original, half & half (tea + lemonade), and higher ABV "Extreme" variants.
- Arnold Palmer Spiked – A collaboration between Molson Coors and AriZona Beverages, launched in 2018, offering a blend of iced tea and lemonade with alcohol.
- Lipton Hard Iced Tea – Launched by PepsiCo and FIFCO USA in 2023, it features a range of fruit-infused tea blends with alcohol.
- Cuppa Hard Iced Tea – A brand based in London, United Kingdom producing 5% ABV hard iced tea with real brewed tea and premium natural Lemon and Peach flavours. Cuppa is stocked in festivals, off-trade, bars, and clubs across the UK.
- Monster Nasty Beast Hard Tea – An extension of the energy drink brand Monster into the alcohol space, launched in 2024 with 6% ABV hard teas in flavors like peach and green tea.
- Mike's Hard Tea and Mike's Harder Tea – Spin-offs from the Mike's Hard Lemonade portfolio offering varying levels of alcohol and fruit flavors.
- U:MI Hard Iced Tea – A UK hard iced tea brand launched in London, producing alcoholic iced tea in ready-to-drink cans. The brand has grown through the UK on-trade, with listings across bars, clubs and music festivals.

== Global market and popularity ==
Hard iced tea has seen growth, particularly in the United States, Canada, and the United Kingdom. Its popularity is tied to consumer demand for flavored ready-to-drink (RTD) alcohol options that align with lower-calorie or caffeine-free lifestyles. According to industry analysts, hard tea presents an "under-tapped" market segment with high upside potential in global RTD strategies.

== See also ==
- Flavored malt beverage
- Hard seltzer
- Iced tea
