= What My World Spins Around =

Single by Jordan Davis

from the album Bluebird Days
- Released: May 27, 2022
- Genre: Country
- Length: 3:06
- Label: MCA Nashville
- Songwriters: Jordan Davis; Ryan Hurd; Matt Dragstrem
- Producer: Paul DiGiovanni

Jordan Davis singles chronology
| "Buy Dirt" (2021) | "What My World Spins Around" (2022) | "Next Thing You Know" (2023) |

"What My World Spins Around" is a song by American country music singer Jordan Davis. It was released on May 27, 2022 as the second single from his second studio album, Bluebird Days (2023). He co-wrote it with Ryan Hurd and Matt Dragstrem.

== Content ==
According to Billboard, Davis wrote the song during a session with songwriters Ryan Hurd and Matt Dragstrem. Davis told the publication he was holding a conversation about the changes that had ensued in his life since his marriage, and provided the title "What My World Spins Around" to the other two. They then assembled a demo, which they took to Davis's producer, Paul DiGiovanni. DiGiovanni noted that he had difficulty coming up with a sound for the song due to it using only two chords. One production choice he made was to use a second guitar effect atop the guitar work of session musician Derek Wells to create a tremolo effect. Jeremy Chua of Taste of Country described the song as a "jaunty, feel-good tune".

== Charts ==
=== Weekly charts ===
Weekly chart performance for "What My World Spins Around"
| Chart (2022–2023) | Peak position |
|---|---|
| Canada Hot 100 (Billboard) | 51 |
| Canada Country (Billboard) | 3 |
| US Billboard Hot 100 | 40 |
| US Country Airplay (Billboard) | 1 |
| US Hot Country Songs (Billboard) | 8 |

=== Year-end charts ===
2022 year-end chart performance for "What My World Spins Around"
| Chart (2022) | Position |
|---|---|
| US Hot Country Songs (Billboard) | 47 |

2023 year-end chart performance for "What My World Spins Around"
| Chart (2023) | Position |
|---|---|
| US Billboard Hot 100 | 91 |
| US Country Airplay (Billboard) | 19 |
| US Hot Country Songs (Billboard) | 48 |

== Certifications ==
Certifications for "What My World Spins Around"
| Region | Certification | Certified units/sales |
|---|---|---|
| Australia (ARIA) | Platinum | 70,000^{‡} |
| Canada (Music Canada) | 3× Platinum | 240,000^{‡} |
| United States (RIAA) | 3× Platinum | 3,000,000^{‡} |
^{‡} Sales+streaming figures based on certification alone.
