= Take It from Me (Jordan Davis song) =

Single by Jordan Davis

from the album Home State
- Released: May 7, 2018
- Genre: Country pop; R&B
- Length: 2:54
- Label: MCA Nashville
- Songwriters: Jordan Davis; Jacob Davis; Jason Gantt
- Producer: Paul DiGiovanni

Jordan Davis singles chronology
| "Singles You Up" (2017) | "Take It from Me" (2018) | "Slow Dance in a Parking Lot" (2019) |

"Take It from Me" is a song co-written and recorded by American country music singer Jordan Davis. It was released in May 2018 as the second single from Davis's debut album Home State (2018). Davis wrote the song with his brother Jacob Davis and Jason Gantt, the former saying he suggested that it be about advice-seeking and Jordan gave it a more literally approach, being about the early stages of a relationship. "Take It from Me" peaked at number two and four on both the Billboard Country Airplay and Hot Country Songs charts respectively. It also reached number 46 on the Hot 100 chart. It was certified triple platinum by the Recording Industry Association of America (RIAA), and has sold 77,000 copies in the United States as of April 2019. The song achieved similar chart success in Canada, reaching number four on the Canada Country chart and number 67 on the Canadian Hot 100. It was certified triple platinum by Music Canada, denoting sales of over 240,000 units in that country. An accompanying music video for the song, directed by Eric Ryan Anderson, follows a couple's adventures through New York City.

== Content and history ==
Jordan Davis wrote the song with his brother, Jacob Davis, and Jason Gantt. Of the songwriting process, Jordan Davis said that his brother provided the idea of an "advice-seeking song", which he then chose to write "a little bit more literally". He also told Billboard that "is a song about the early stages of a relationship when it doesn't matter what she wants from you, she can take it -- your time, your shirts, anything -- she can have it. I think everybody has gone through that honeymoon phase of a relationship".

== Commercial performance ==
The song reached number two on Billboard's Country Airplay chart dated March 9, 2019, having been blocked from number one by Luke Combs's "Beautiful Crazy". On the Billboard Hot 100, it debuted at number 75 the week of January 12, 2019. Eight weeks later, it peaked at number 46 and stayed on the chart for thirteen weeks. It has sold 77,000 copies in the United States as of April 2019. It was certified triple platinum by the Recording Industry Association of America (RIAA) on March 25, 2026.

In Canada, the track debuted at number 97 on the Canadian Hot 100 the week of February 2, 2019. Seven weeks later, it peaked at number 67 and remained on the chart for ten weeks. It was certified triple platinum by Music Canada on May 11, 2023, denoting sales of over 240,000 units in that country.

== Music video ==
The song's video was directed by Eric Ryan Anderson. It was shot in New York City and follows a couple's adventures through the city. Davis premiered the video on Billboard's website in July 2018.

== Track listing ==
Original version
| No. | Title | Length |
|---|---|---|
| 1. | "Take It from Me" (original version) | 2:54 |

Stripped version
| No. | Title | Length |
|---|---|---|
| 1. | "Take It from Me" (Stripped version) | 2:54 |

Brandon Day version
| No. | Title | Length |
|---|---|---|
| 1. | "Take It from Me" (Brandon Day remix) | 3:00 |

== Charts ==
=== Weekly charts ===
| Chart (2018–2019) | Peak position |
|---|---|
| Canada Hot 100 (Billboard) | 67 |
| Canada Country (Billboard) | 4 |
| US Billboard Hot 100 | 46 |
| US Country Airplay (Billboard) | 2 |
| US Hot Country Songs (Billboard) | 4 |

=== Year-end charts ===
| Chart (2018) | Position |
|---|---|
| US Hot Country Songs (Billboard) | 82 |

| Chart (2019) | Position |
|---|---|
| US Country Airplay (Billboard) | 40 |
| US Hot Country Songs (Billboard) | 44 |

== Certifications ==
| Region | Certification | Certified units/sales |
|---|---|---|
| Australia (ARIA) | Platinum | 70,000^{‡} |
| Canada (Music Canada) | 3× Platinum | 240,000^{‡} |
| United States (RIAA) | 3× Platinum | 3,000,000^{‡} |
^{‡} Sales+streaming figures based on certification alone.
