= Almost Maybes =

Single by Jordan Davis

from the EP Jordan Davis
- Released: May 25, 2020
- Genre: Country
- Length: 2:59
- Label: MCA Nashville
- Songwriter(s): Jordan Davis; Hillary Lindsey; Jesse Frasure
- Producer(s): Paul DiGiovanni

Jordan Davis singles chronology
"Slow Dance in a Parking Lot" (2019)	"Almost Maybes" (2020)	"Buy Dirt" (2021)

"Almost Maybes" is a song co-written and recorded by American country music singer Jordan Davis. It was released in May 2020 as the lead single from Davis' eponymous EP.

== Content ==
Jordan Davis wrote "Almost Maybes" with Hillary Lindsey and Jesse Frasure, and it was produced by Paul DiGiovanni. Lyrically, Davis said the song was inspired by past relationships that didn't work out that lead you to the one you're supposed to be with: "I love the message of it. I think everybody can relate to those people in your life that, it might not have been the right one, and it sucked at the time when you're going through it, but it just gets you one step closer to the person you're gonna be with." The song has been compared to a modern take on Garth Brooks' song "Unanswered Prayers".

== Charts ==
=== Weekly charts ===
Weekly chart performance for "Almost Maybes"
Chart (2020–2021)	Peak position
Canada (Canadian Hot 100)	60
Canada Country (Billboard)	6
US Billboard Hot 100	43
US Country Airplay (Billboard)	5
US Hot Country Songs (Billboard)	7

=== Year-end charts ===
2020 year-end chart performance for "Almost Maybes"
Chart (2020)	Position
US Hot Country Songs (Billboard)	67

2021 year-end chart performance for "Almost Maybes"
Chart (2021)	Position
US Country Airplay (Billboard)	9
US Hot Country Songs (Billboard)	18

== Certifications ==
Certifications for "Almost Maybes"
Region	Certification	Certified units/sales
Australia (ARIA)	Platinum	70,000^{‡}
Canada (Music Canada)	2× Platinum	160,000^{‡}
United States (RIAA)	2× Platinum	2,000,000^{‡}
^{‡} Sales+streaming figures based on certification alone.
