= Josh Jenkins (songwriter) =

American singer-songwriter

- Genre: Country
- Occupation: Songwriter
- Instruments: Vocals; guitar; piano

Josh Jenkins is an American singer-songwriter, based in Nashville. He is lead singer of the band Green River Ordinance. Growing up, Jenkins spent time singing at local opries in Texas, and ultimately joined the band at 15 years old, where he spent 15 years as the lead singer. Jenkins now resides in Nashville, largely focusing his craft on songwriting. Jenkins signed a worldwide publishing deal with powerhouse publisher SMACKsongs in late 2016. Jenkins’ songs have been recorded by artists such as Walker Hayes, Jordan Davis, Muscadine Bloodline, Randy Houser, and more. Jenkins has also started to release solo projects, including his first three singles, “Broken Record,” “Perfect Mess,” and “More Beautiful.”

== Songwriting discography ==
Year	Artist	Album	Song	Co-writer(s)
2006	Green River Ordinance	The Beauty of Letting Go	"Breath of Life"	Green River Ordinance (Jenkins, Geoff Ice, Denton Hunker, Joshua Wilkerson, Jamey Ice)
2006	Green River Ordinance	The Beauty of Letting Go	"Piece It Together"	Green River Ordinance
2006	Green River Ordinance	The Beauty of Letting Go	"Re-Run"	Green River Ordinance
2006	Green River Ordinance	The Beauty of Letting Go	"Waiting for a Sign"	Green River Ordinance
2006	Green River Ordinance	The Beauty of Letting Go	"Everything You Are"	Green River Ordinance
2006	Green River Ordinance	The Beauty of Letting Go	"Secrets and Lies"	Green River Ordinance
2006	Green River Ordinance	The Beauty of Letting Go	"Pick Me Up"	Green River Ordinance
2006	Green River Ordinance	The Beauty of Letting Go	"Speak Through Me"	Green River Ordinance
2006	Green River Ordinance	The Beauty of Letting Go	"Stay"	Green River Ordinance
2006	Green River Ordinance	The Beauty of Letting Go	"Catch Me On Your Break"	Green River Ordinance
2007	Green River Ordinance	Way Back Home - EP	"Here We Are"	Green River Ordinance
2007	Green River Ordinance	Way Back Home - EP	"Sleep It Off"	Green River Ordinance
2007	Green River Ordinance	Way Back Home - EP	"Come On"	Green River Ordinance
2007	Green River Ordinance	Way Back Home - EP	"19"	Green River Ordinance
2007	Green River Ordinance	Way Back Home - EP	"Beauty of Letting Go"	Green River Ordinance
2009	Green River Ordinance	Out of My Hands	"Outside"	Green River Ordinance
2009	Green River Ordinance	Out of My Hands	"Come On"	Green River Ordinance
2009	Green River Ordinance	Out of My Hands	"Out of My Hands"	Green River Ordinance
2009	Green River Ordinance	Out of My Hands	"On Your Own"	Green River Ordinance
2009	Green River Ordinance	Out of My Hands	"Goodbye L.A."	Green River Ordinance
2009	Green River Ordinance	Out of My Hands	"Different (Anything at All)"	Green River Ordinance, Raine Maida
2009	Green River Ordinance	Out of My Hands	"Learning"	Green River Ordinance, Emerson Hart
2009	Green River Ordinance	Out of My Hands	"Last October"	Green River Ordinance, Hodges
2009	Green River Ordinance	Out of My Hands	"Sleep It Off"	Green River Ordinance
2009	Green River Ordinance	Out of My Hands	"Getting Older"	Green River Ordinance
2009	Green River Ordinance	Out of My Hands	"Endlessly"	Green River Ordinance, Maida
2009	Green River Ordinance	Single	"Come On"	Green River Ordinance
2010	Green River Ordinance	2010 Winter Olympics' AT&T Team USA Soundtrack	"Rise Up"	Green River Ordinance
2010	Green River Ordinance	Freedom (International Justice Mission's charity album)	"Don't Give Up"	Green River Ordinance
2010	Green River Ordinance	Single	"On Your Own"	Green River Ordinance
2010	Green River Ordinance	Wait a Minute	"Tight Rope"	Green River Ordinance
2010	Green River Ordinance	Wait a Minute	"Whisper In Your Ear"	Green River Ordinance
2010	Green River Ordinance	Wait a Minute	"On Your Own"	Green River Ordinance
2010	Green River Ordinance	Wait a Minute	"Breath of Life"	Green River Ordinance
2010	Green River Ordinance	Wait a Minute	"Here We Are"	Green River Ordinance
2010	Green River Ordinance	Wait a Minute	"Everything You Are"	Green River Ordinance
2010	Green River Ordinance	Wait a Minute	"Beauty of Letting Go"	Green River Ordinance
2010	Green River Ordinance	Wait a Minute	"Piece It Together"	Green River Ordinance
2010	Green River Ordinance	Wait a Minute	"Goodbye L.A."	Green River Ordinance
2010	Green River Ordinance	The Morning Passengers EP: Acoustic Sessions	"Dancing Shoes"	Green River Ordinance
2010	Green River Ordinance	The Morning Passengers EP: Acoustic Sessions	"Uncertainly Certain"	Green River Ordinance
2010	Green River Ordinance	The Morning Passengers EP: Acoustic Sessions	"Undertow"	Green River Ordinance
2010	Green River Ordinance	The Morning Passengers EP: Acoustic Sessions	"Inward Tide"	Green River Ordinance
2010	Green River Ordinance	The Morning Passengers EP: Acoustic Sessions	"Out of the Storm"	Green River Ordinance
2010	Green River Ordinance	The Morning Passengers EP: Acoustic Sessions	"Where The West Wind Blows"	Green River Ordinance
2011	Green River Ordinance	Single	"Heart of Me"	Green River Ordinance
2011	Tim Halperin	Rise and Fall	"I Believe"	Tim Halperin, Jordan Critz
2012	Green River Ordinance	Single	"Heart of Me"	Green River Ordinance
2012	Green River Ordinance	Under Fire	"Dark Night"	Green River Ordinance
2012	Green River Ordinance	Under Fire	"New Day"	Green River Ordinance
2012	Green River Ordinance	Under Fire	"Heart of Me"	Green River Ordinance
2012	Green River Ordinance	Under Fire	"Resting Hour"	Green River Ordinance
2012	Green River Ordinance	Under Fire	"Under Fire"	Green River Ordinance
2012	Green River Ordinance	Under Fire	"Healing Touch"	Green River Ordinance
2012	Green River Ordinance	Under Fire	"Love Laid Down"	Green River Ordinance
2012	Green River Ordinance	Under Fire	"Home"	Green River Ordinance
2012	Green River Ordinance	Under Fire	"Heart of the Young"	Green River Ordinance
2012	Green River Ordinance	Under Fire	"Crawling"	Green River Ordinance
2012	Green River Ordinance	Under Fire	"San Antone"	Green River Ordinance
2012	Green River Ordinance	Under Fire	"Brother"	Green River Ordinance
2012	Green River Ordinance	Under Fire	"Don't Be Afraid"	Green River Ordinance
2012	Green River Ordinance	Under Fire	"Lost In The World"	Green River Ordinance
2012	Green River Ordinance	Under Fire	"Dancing Shoes"	Green River Ordinance
2013	Green River Ordinance	Chasing Down the Wind - EP	"Cannery River"	Green River Ordinance
2013	Green River Ordinance	Chasing Down the Wind - EP	"It Ain't Love"	Green River Ordinance
2013	Green River Ordinance	Chasing Down the Wind - EP	"When My Days Are Gone"	Green River Ordinance
2013	Green River Ordinance	Chasing Down the Wind - EP	"Flying"	Green River Ordinance
2013	Green River Ordinance	Chasing Down the Wind - EP	"She Is In The Air"	Green River Ordinance
2013	Green River Ordinance	Chasing Down the Wind - EP	"Better Love"	Green River Ordinance
2013	Green River Ordinance	Chasing Down the Wind - EP	"Fool For You"	Green River Ordinance
2013	A Rocket To The Moon	Wild & Free	"Ever Enough"	A Rocket To The Moon
2014	Uncle Kracker	Single	"Endlessly"	Denton Hunker, Geoff Ice, Jamey Ice, Raine Maida
2015	Green River Ordinance	Single	"Red Fire Night"	Green River Ordinance
2016	Green River Ordinance	Single	"Simple Life"	Green River Ordinance
2016	Green River Ordinance	Fifteen	"Keep Your Cool"	Green River Ordinance
2016	Green River Ordinance	Fifteen	"Red Fire Night"	Green River Ordinance
2016	Green River Ordinance	Fifteen	"Maybe It's Time (Gravity)"	Green River Ordinance
2016	Green River Ordinance	Fifteen	"Simple Life"	Green River Ordinance
2016	Green River Ordinance	Fifteen	"Tallahassee"	Green River Ordinance
2016	Green River Ordinance	Fifteen	"You, Me & the Sea"	Green River Ordinance
2016	Green River Ordinance	Fifteen	"Always Love Her"	Green River Ordinance
2016	Green River Ordinance	Fifteen	"Endlessly"	Green River Ordinance
2016	Green River Ordinance	Fifteen	"Only God Knows"	Green River Ordinance
2016	Green River Ordinance	Fifteen	"Life in the Wind"	Green River Ordinance
2016	Green River Ordinance	Fifteen	"Keep My Heart Open"	Green River Ordinance
2016	Randy Houser	Fired Up	"Whiskeysippi River"	Matt Jenkins, Trevor Rosen
2016	Walker Hayes	8Tracks, Vol. 1: Good Shit	"Bad Thing (Good Shit)"	Walker Hayes, Matthew McVaney
2017	Clark Manson	Friday Nighters	"Anytime Is A Good Time"	Brad Tursi, Josh Hodge, Heather Morgan
2018	Jordan Davis	Home State	"Sundowners"	Matt Jenkins, Jordan Davis
2018	Sister Hazel	Water: EP	"I Stayed For The Girl"	Josh Dorr, M. Rodgers
2018	Muscadine Bloodline	Movin' On	"Put Me On A Road"	Muscadine Bloodline
2018	Josh Jenkins	Single	Broken Record	Brandon Hood, April Geesbreght
2018	Josh Jenkins	Single	Perfect Mess	Matt Jenkins, Bryan Simpson
2019	SAILR	Single	Not Too Late	Jordan Critz
2019	SAILR	Single	Heartbeat	Jordan Critz
2019	Josh Jenkins	Single	More Beautiful	Jordan Critz
2022	Drake Milligan	Dallas/Fort Worth	"Kiss Goodbye All Night"	Brandon Hood, Drake Milligan, Phil O'Donnell
