= Twisted Tea =

American hard tea brand

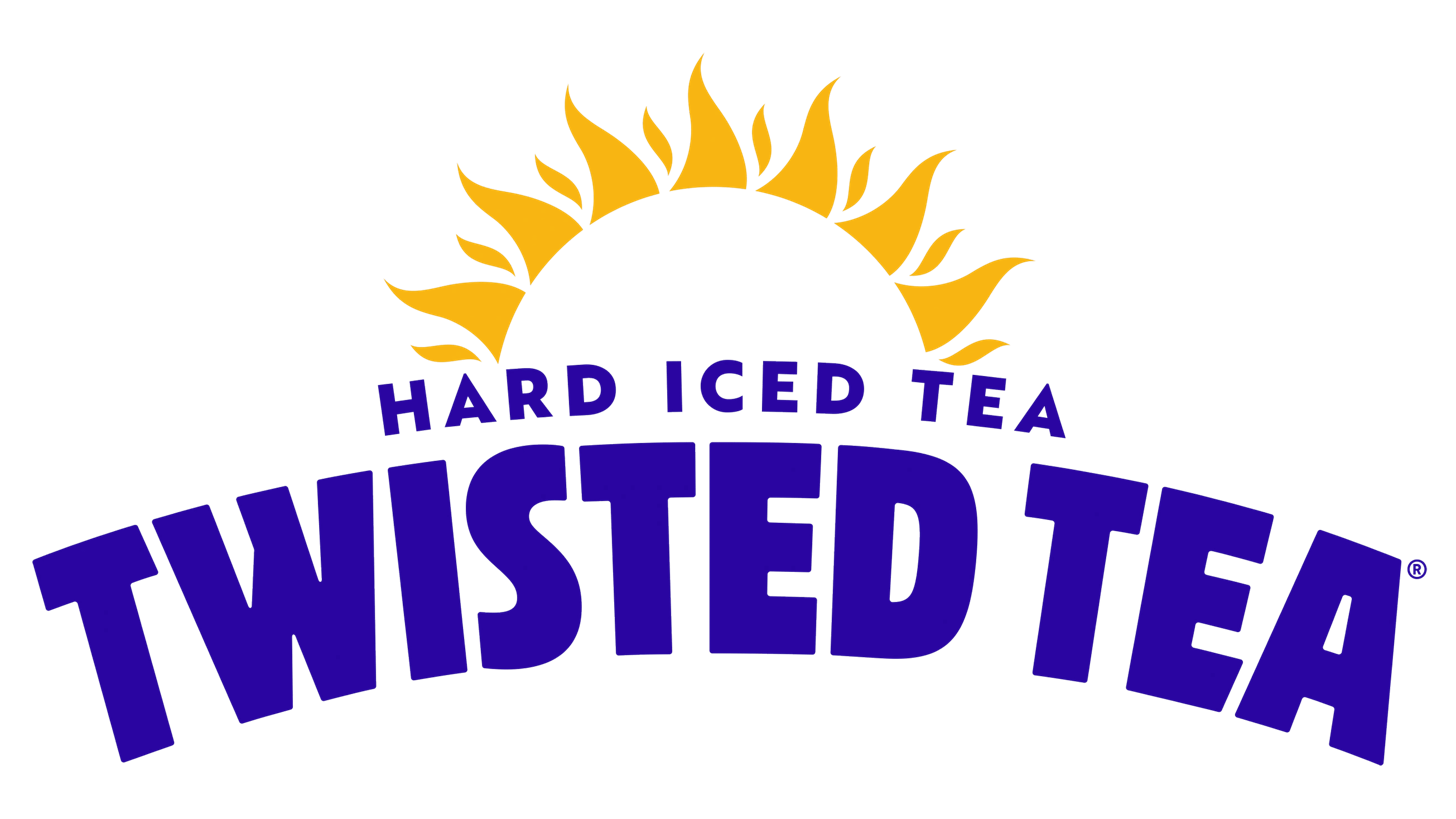

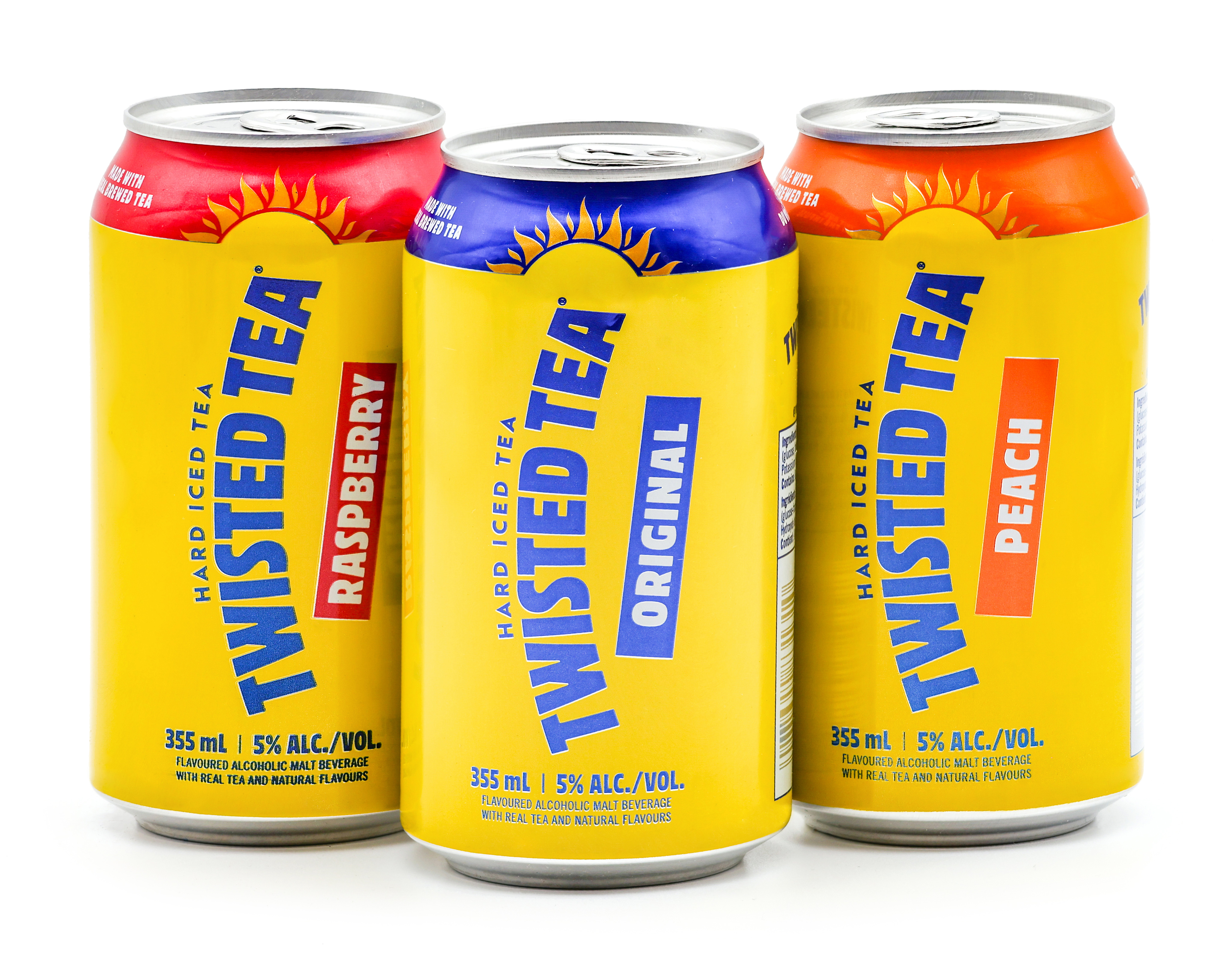
- Type: Alcoholic beverage
- Manufacturer: Boston Beer Company
- Introduced: 2000; 26 years ago (as Bodean's Twisted Tea); 2001; 25 years ago (as Twisted Tea)
- Alcohol by volume: 5% (US & Canada)
- Style: Hard iced tea
- Website: www.twistedtea.com

Twisted Tea is an American brand of hard iced tea produced by the Boston Beer Company. Introduced in 2000 as BoDean's Twisted Tea while other flavored malt beverages were becoming popular, the brand was renamed in 2001 after a lawsuit from the band BoDeans. The brand was successful in rural markets, and over time sales were extended into new and urban markets. By 2022 it was the most popular hard iced tea in the United States, as well as one of the Boston Beer Company's best-selling products. It is available in numerous flavors, as well as an Extreme line that contains a higher alcohol content.

== History ==
Twisted Tea was introduced by the Boston Beer Company in 2000, as flavored malt beverages such as Mike's Hard Lemonade and Smirnoff Ice were gaining popularity in the United States. President Jim Koch advocated for the product as "brewing tea in the same tanks where beer is brewed made some logistical sense"; at the time Boston Beer was already under contract to brew Tradewinds Tea. The product was originally named BoDean's Twisted Tea, reportedly after two employees who had worked on its development, and tested in the Southern United States. Writing in 2016, Koch recalled that the product initially had limited success, in part due to a lack of advertising.

In late 2000 the Milwaukee-based band BoDeans sued Boston Beer for trademark infringement, arguing that a mid-2000 advertisement had implied their endorsement of BoDean's Twisted Tea; this advertisement, circulated in Milwaukee, had included a short text about the band's performance at Summerfest as well as images of guitars. Although Boston Beer initially denied any wrongdoing, in 2001 it agreed to stop its efforts to register the BoDean's Twisted Tea trademark and cease all marketing and sales under this name. Boston Beer then relaunched the product as "Twisted Tea", without the BoDean's name.

Initially, Twisted Tea was expected to appeal to women and rural drinkers, segments where Boston Beer had little reach. Releases in rural areas of the Northeastern United States, including in New Hampshire and Maine, found early success. Over time, as distribution expanded, Boston Beer realized that the majority of drinkers were working-class men; speaking at the Beer Industry Summit in 2022, Koch recalled, "We thought it was gonna be yuppies who drink Snapple, and it turned out to be blue collar guys". Boston Beer thus refocused its marketing of Twisted Tea on male drinkers. It employed an events-based model, with sponsorships including the Sturgis Motorcycle Rally, the Esports Awards, and the esports group 100 Thieves.

After reporting over a decade of double-digit growth in sales, by 2022, Twisted Tea was the second-best selling Boston Beer product, behind Truly Hard Seltzer; that year, it moved three times as many units as the company's Samuel Adams beer in retail. At the time, its market share was limited by distribution, which excluded several states, as well as the lack of draught products. By 2023, Twisted Tea was one of the few Boston Beer products reporting growth, as sales of the previously dominant Truly faltered. In 2024, 3.150 million barrels of Twisted Tea were shipped, accounting for approximately 57% of Boston Beer's volume.

Following the success of Twisted Tea, several companies released tea-flavored malt beverages, including Mike's Hard Lemonade and White Claw Hard Seltzer. Other competitors introduced in the 2020s included Voodoo Ranger Hardcharged Tea, AriZona Hard Tea, and Nasty Beast Hard Tea. In 2022, Twisted Tea was the most popular hard iced tea in the United States, controlling 93% of the market; this had decreased to 84.5% in 2024, in the face of increased competition.

== Products ==
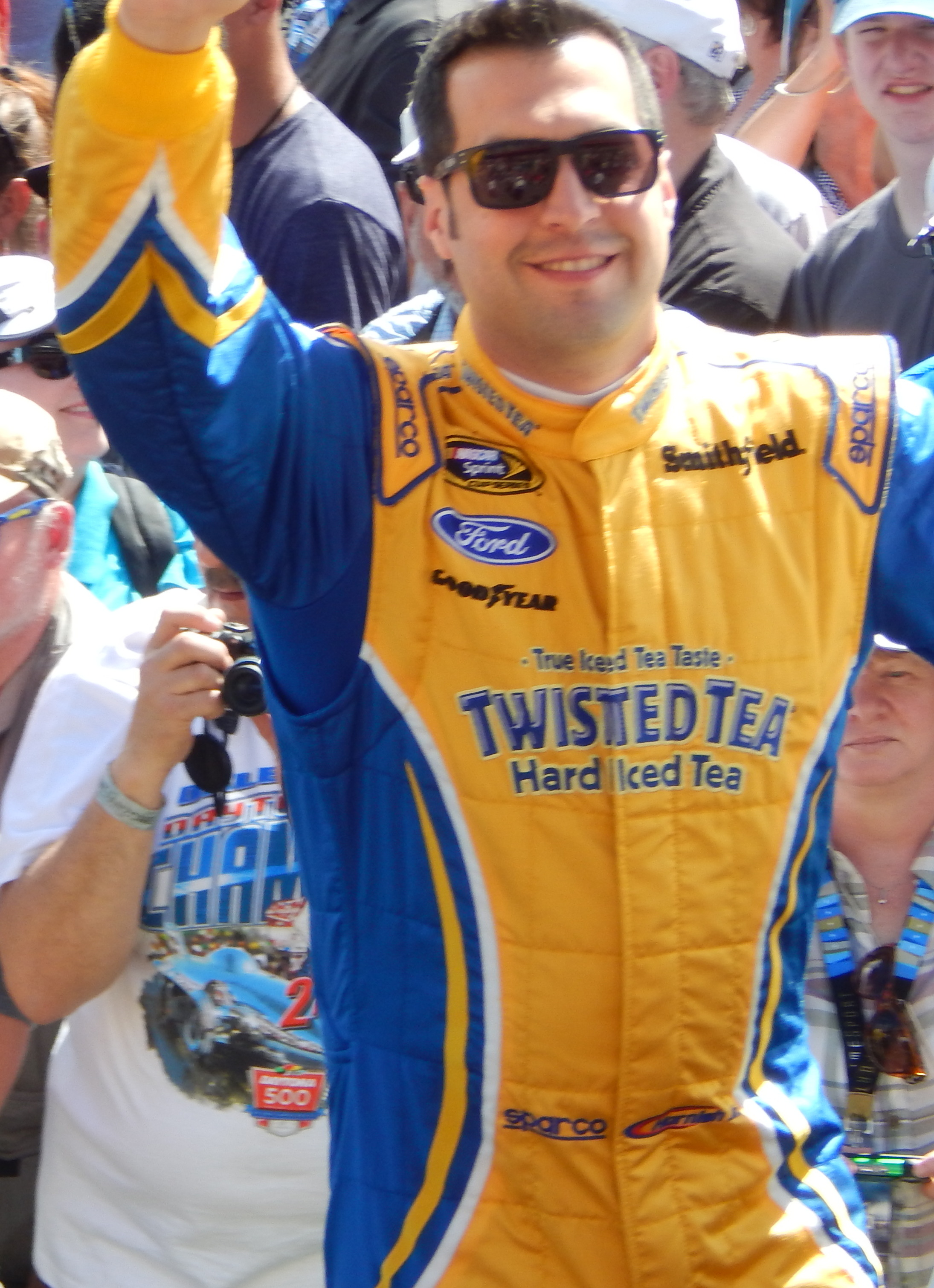
Sam Hornish Jr. wearing a Twisted Tea uniform, 2015 Daytona 500; such sponsorships have often been used for marketing.

Twisted Tea is available in several flavors. Aside from the original flavor, these include half-and-half, peach, and raspberry, which are sold bundled in a variety pack with the original flavor. Twisted Tea Light is sold as using a sugar-light recipe, although its markets are limited. Other flavors available as of 2023 include mango, blueberry, blackberry, mangonada, sweet cherry lime, slightly sweet, and pineapple. Retired flavors include Twisted Lemonade, introduced in 2015 and discontinued shortly afterwards, and Backyard Batch, a high-sugar recipe modelled after sun tea, as well as black cherry and passion fruit. As of 2024, the original flavor of Twisted Tea accounts for most sales, followed by half-and-half.

Twisted Tea products are sold at retail in several configurations, including 12 oz. (355 ml) and 24 oz. (710 ml) cans as well as 5-and-10-litre (1.1 and 2.2 imp gal; 1.3 and 2.6 US gal) "Bag N' Box" containers. The original Twisted Tea products contain 5% alcohol by volume (ABV). The Extreme line of products, introduced in 2023, contains 8% ABV, with flavors including Long Island iced tea, fruit punch, lemon, and blue raspberry.

== In popular culture ==
Despite its sales, Twisted Tea has had little currency in popular culture for much of its existence. Nonetheless, in a 2022 profile of Twisted Tea for Good Beer Hunting, Kate Bernot described the brand as having a "rabid" fanbase. She cited examples of consumers tattooing themselves with the logo or treating the brand as a friend. Fans also submit media to Twisted Tea for the opportunity to be included on cans. The company uses the hobbies evidenced in these submissions to identify potential sponsorships.

Twisted Tea went viral in December 2020 after video footage taken at a Circle K in Elyria, Ohio, was uploaded to YouTube. The video depicted an unidentified White man directing racial epithets at and threatening a Black customer, provoking him into attacking the antagonizer with a large can of Twisted Tea. The Black customer, later identified as Barry Allen, was nicknamed "Mr. TeaKO" for his actions, and memes depicting Twisted Tea as a weapon were widely disseminated on the Internet. Although supporters hoped that Allen would receive a sponsorship, Twisted Tea refused, citing the violence and language involved in the video. In its 2021 recap, the search engine Google listed "Twisted Tea" as the third most-searched Internet meme of the year.

== Works cited ==
- Bernot, Kate (March 23, 2022). "Spill It — Twisted Tea's Unpredictable, Unparalleled 21-Year Success Story". Good Beer Hunting. Archived from the original on February 15, 2026.
- "BoDeans Settle Lawsuit with Boston Brewing Company". Milwaukee Business Journal. September 9, 2001. Archived from the original on February 16, 2026.
- Brown, Mark (November 20, 2000). "BoDeans Battle Brewery". ABC News. Archived from the original on February 16, 2026.
- D'Ambrosio, Dan (December 12, 2021). "Guess Which Internet Meme with a VT Connection Topped Google's Search List for 2021?". The Burlington Free Press.
- Deppen, Laurel (January 23, 2026). "Twisted Tea Packs a Punch with New High-alcohol Flavors". Food Dive. ProQuest 3296798119 – via ProQuest.
- Eager, Jennifer; Maxwell, Samantha (November 22, 2023). "Every Twisted Tea Flavor Ranked Worst To Best". Mashed. Archived from the original on February 16, 2026.
- Hein, Michael (January 10, 2021). "Twisted Tea Manufacturers Won't Sponsor Puncher in Viral 'TeaKO' Video". popculture. Archived from the original on February 16, 2026.
- Infante, Dave (January 15, 2021). "Barry Allen (a.k.a. Mr. TeaKO) on His Viral Video, Politics, and Whether He'll Still Drink Twisted Tea". VinePair. Archived from the original on February 16, 2026.
- Infante, Dave (August 9, 2024). "How Boston Beer Co. Got Ambushed by Twisted Tea's Biggest New Threat". VinePair. Archived from the original on February 16, 2026.
- Infante, Jessica (July 24, 2024). "Bernstein: Twisted Tea is 'Only Meaningful Source of Growth' for Boston Beer; Predicts +9% Growth in Next 5 Years". Brew Bound. Archived from the original on July 27, 2024.
- Khermouch, Gerry (February 7, 2000). "Rick Aside, Seagram Revs Up Core Beverages". Brandweek. Vol. 41, no. 6. p. 6. ProQuest 218076130 – via ProQuest.
- Koch, James (2016). Quench Your Own Thirst: Business Lessons Learned over a Beer or Two. Macmillan. ISBN 978-1-250-07050-0.
- Licata, Zoe (February 7, 2022). "Boston Beer Invests $5 Million in Twisted Tea Winter Ad Buy as Brand Marketing Goes Year-Round". Brew Bound. Archived from the original on July 24, 2024.
- Licata, Zoe (April 28, 2023). "Boston Beer Expecting Double-Digit Twisted Tea Growth Through 2023; Some 'Green Shoots' for Truly Despite Sales Declines". Brew Bound. Archived from the original on February 16, 2026.
- Nichols, Allyson (August 31, 2021). "The Untold Truth Of Twisted Tea". Mashed. Archived from the original on February 16, 2026.
