= Singles You Up =

Single by Jordan Davis

from the album Home State
- Released: June 6, 2017
- Genre: Country pop
- Length: 3:03
- Label: MCA Nashville
- Songwriter(s): Jordan Davis; Steven Dale Jones; Justin Ebach
- Producer(s): Paul DiGiovanni

Jordan Davis singles chronology
"Singles You Up" (2017)	"Take It from Me" (2018)

"Singles You Up" is a song co-written and recorded by American country music singer Jordan Davis. It was released in June 2017 as his debut single and the lead single from his debut album, Home State. A stripped version and Ryan Riback remix were released in 2018.

== Content ==
The song is about a man attempting to woo a woman who is currently with another man. He states that he will be present if her man ever "singles [her] up", or leaves her. Davis wrote the song with Steven Dale Jones and Justin Ebach. Davis said that "When we finally honed in on the way we ended up approaching it, it was this guy having to wait his turn, seeing this girl with somebody else. He has feelings for her and hopes the other guy screws it up somehow. Once we honed in on that, we wrote it really quick."

== Critical reception ==
Mike Thiel of Taste of Country reviewed the song with favor, praising the use of internal rhyme and calling it an "easygoing singalong".

== Commercial performance ==
The song reached No. 1 on Country Airplay, and No. 4 on Hot Country Songs for charts dated April 21, 2018. It has sold 237,000 copies in the United States as of June 2018.

== Music video ==
The music video was directed by Eric Ryan Anderson and premiered on CMT, GAC and Vevo in February 2018. It was filmed in the deserts of El Paso, TX. It revolves around a storyline of Jordan "stealing" his love interest from another man and taking her away in a vintage Pontiac Firebird, and recording the adventure on his iPhone.

== Track listings ==
Original version
No.	Title	Length
1.	"Singles You Up" (original version)	3:02

Stripped version
No.	Title	Length
1.	"Singles You Up" (Stripped version)	3:00

Ryan Riback version
No.	Title	Length
1.	"Singles You Up" (Ryan Riback remix)	3:18

== Chart performance ==
=== Weekly charts ===
Chart (2017–2018)	Peak position
Canada (Canadian Hot 100)	64
Canada Country (Billboard)	1
US Billboard Hot 100	50
US Country Airplay (Billboard)	1
US Hot Country Songs (Billboard)	4

=== Year-end charts ===
Chart (2017)	Position
US Hot Country Songs (Billboard)	92
Chart (2018)	Position
US Country Airplay (Billboard)	28
US Hot Country Songs (Billboard)	19
US Radio Songs (Billboard)	57

== Certifications ==
Region	Certification	Certified units/sales
Australia (ARIA)	2× Platinum	140,000^{‡}
Canada (Music Canada)	4× Platinum	320,000^{‡}
New Zealand (RMNZ)	Gold	15,000^{‡}
United States (RIAA)	4× Platinum	4,000,000^{‡}
^{‡} Sales+streaming figures based on certification alone.
