= Fifteen (Green River Ordinance album) =

Studio album by Green River Ordinance
- Released: January 22, 2016
- Recorded: 2015
- Genre: Rock, Alternative rock, country
- Length: 41:25
- Label: Residence Music

Green River Ordinance chronology
Under Fire (2012)	Fifteen (2016)

Singles from Fifteen
- 1. "Red Fire Night" Released: September 25, 2015

Fifteen is the fourth full-length studio album by American rock band Green River Ordinance, released on January 22, 2016, through Residence Music. The album marks the band's fifteenth year together and is the reason behind its title. It was recorded using analog tape in separate sessions in three cities with producers Paul Moak, Rick Beato and Jordan Critz.

== Critical reception ==
Professional ratings
Review scores
Source	Rating
CCM Magazine	4/5 stars
Roughstock	Positive

In a four star review in CCM Magazine, Andy Argyrakis describes, "It’s all perfect for a backyard bonfire, front porch swing or intimate gathering amongst close friends, though it’s sure to sound just as sweet pumping out a dashboard radio." In another positive review, Matt Bjorke of Roughstock calls it "a fantastic album."

== Track listing ==
Source: iTunes and Fifteen's liner notes.

All tracks are written by Green River Ordinance; 'Endlessly' co-written by Raine Maida

No.	Title	Producer	Length
1.	"Keep Your Cool"	Paul Moak	4:18
2.	"Red Fire Night"	Rick Beato	3:08
3.	"Maybe It's Time (Gravity)"	Moak	2:51
4.	"Simple Life"	Moak	3:57
5.	"Tallahassee"	Jordan Critz	4:30
6.	"You, Me & The Sea"	Critz	3:44
7.	"Always Love Her"	Moak	3:24
8.	"Endlessly"	Critz	3:57
9.	"Only God Knows"	Beato	3:36
10.	"Life in the Wind"	Moak	2:55
11.	"Keep My Heart Open"	Moak	4:59
Total length:			41:25

== Personnel ==
Credits adapted from Fifteen's liner notes.

Green River Ordinance

- Denton Hunker – drums, percussion
- Geoff Ice – bass, vocals, harmonica
- Jamey Ice — banjo, mandolin, lead guitar, resonator, 12 string electric
- Josh Jenkins – acoustic guitar, lead vocals
- Joshua Wilkerson – electric guitar, vocals, mandolin, piano

Additional musicians

- Ross Holmes — fiddle ("Simple Life")
- Lindsey Duffin – fiddle ("Red Fire Night", "Lucky Ones", "Gold", "Always Love Her", "Endlessly")
- Milo Deering — pedal steel guitar ("Endlessly")
- Chad Copelin — organ ("Endlessly")
- Jordan Critz – electric guitar ("Tallahassee", "You Me & The Sea"), piano ("Tallahassee", "Endlessly"), organ ("Tallahassee", "Endlessly", "You Me & The Sea"), lap steel guitar ("You Me & The Sea"), background vocals ("Always Love Her", "Simple Life", "Keep My Heart Open", "Keep Your Cool", "Life In The Wind", "Maybe It's Time")
- Paul Moak — electric guitar ("Keep Your Cool"), organ ("Keep My Heart Open", "Keep Your Cool", "Maybe It's Time"), slide guitar ("Life In The Wind"), keyboard ("Life In The Wind", "Keep My Heart Open"), pedal steel guitar ("Simple Life")
- Rick Beato — piano, organ ("Red Fire Night", "Only God Knows")

Technical personnel

- Jordan Critz – production ("Tallahassee", "You Me & The Sea", "Endlessly"), engineer ("Tallahassee", "You Me & The Sea", "Endlessly")
- Paul Moak – production ("Always Love Her", "Simple Life", "Keep My Heart Open", "Keep Your Cool", "Life In The Wind", "Maybe It's Time")
- Rick Beato – production ("Red Fire Night", "Only God Knows")
- Ken "GL" Lanyon – engineer ("Red Fire Night", "Only God Knows")
- Devin Vaughan – engineer ("Always Love Her", "Simple Life", "Keep My Heart Open", "Keep Your Cool", "Life In The Wind", "Maybe It's Time")
- Todd Robbins — mixing
- Brad Blackwood — mastering
- Shaun Menary – photography
- Stereotonic – design & layout

== Commercial performance ==
Fifteen debuted at number 103 on the US Billboard 200 and number one on Billboard's Folk Albums chart, selling 5,100 copies in its first week of release.

== Charts ==
Chart (2016)	Peak position
US Billboard 200	103
US Folk Albums (Billboard)	1
US Independent Albums (Billboard)	5
US Top Rock Albums (Billboard)	8

== Release history ==
List of release dates, showing region, format(s), label and reference
Region	Date	Format(s)	Label	Ref.
Worldwide	January 22, 2016	CD; digital download	Residence Music	
