= Jordan Davis (singer) =

American singer-songwriter (born 1988)

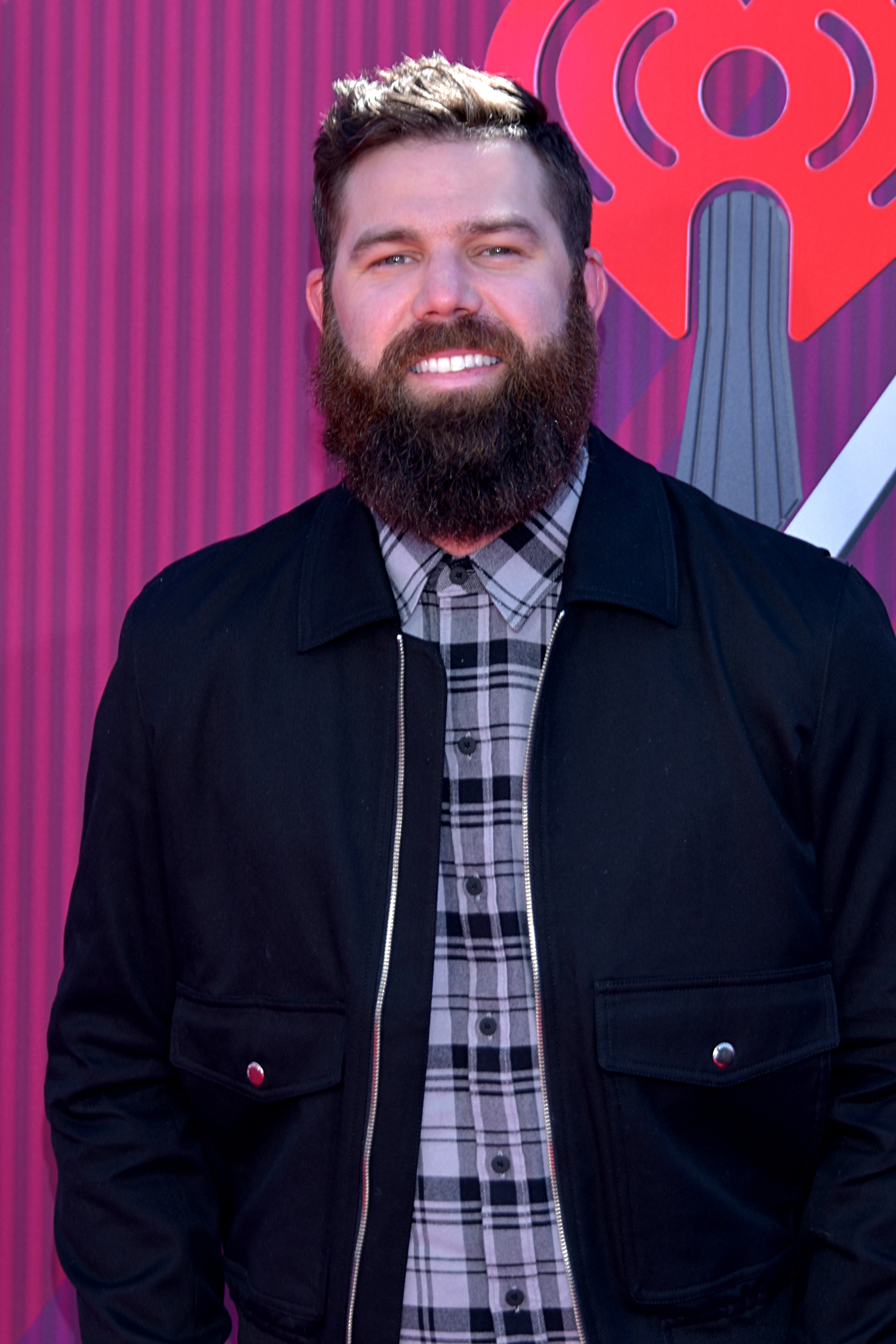
- Davis in 2019

Background information
- Born: Jordan Carl Wheeler Davis; March 30, 1988 (age 38); Shreveport, Louisiana, U.S.
- Genres: Country; country pop
- Occupations: Singer; songwriter
- Instruments: Vocals; guitar
- Years active: 2017–present
- Label: MCA Nashville

Jordan Carl Wheeler Davis (born March 30, 1988) is an American country music singer and songwriter. He is signed to Universal Music Group Nashville's MCA Nashville division, for which he has released the albums Home State in 2018, Bluebird Days in 2023 and Learn the Hard Way in 2025, as well as two extended plays. His discography also includes eleven singles, of which five have reached number one on the Country Airplay chart.

== Biography and career ==
Jordan Carl Wheeler Davis was born in Shreveport, Louisiana to mother Luwanna and father Ricky. His uncle, Stan Paul Davis, wrote Tracy Lawrence's hit singles "Today's Lonely Fool" and "Better Man, Better Off". His older brother, Jacob, is also a country music singer. He graduated from C. E. Byrd High School in Shreveport and Louisiana State University in Baton Rouge with a degree in environmental science.

After college graduation, he moved to Nashville in 2012 and secured a recording contract with Universal Music Group Nashville in 2016.

Davis's debut single, "Singles You Up", was released in mid-2017. He wrote the song with Steven Dale Jones and Justin Ebach. It hit number one on the Billboard Country Airplay chart in April 2018. The corresponding debut album, Home State, was released on March 23, 2018. Paul DiGiovanni, guitarist for Boys Like Girls, produced the album. "Take It from Me" was released to country radio on May 7, 2018; it was the second single from the album. It reached number two on the Country Airplay chart in March 2019. The album's third single, "Slow Dance in a Parking Lot" released to country radio on April 22, 2019, and also topped Country Airplay. His hit song, "Buy Dirt", featuring country music star Luke Bryan, was the only one out of two extended songs to hit top 100 in Canada.

In May 2020, Davis announced the release of his self-titled extended play, which was produced by Paul DiGiovanni. Davis said "I can't tell y'all how pumped I am for y'all to hear these songs. I'm proud of this one." The EP was preceded by the release of "Cool Anymore", "Detours", and "Almost Maybes". Davis was nominated for ACM Song of the Year and Single of the Year with "Buy Dirt" featuring Luke Bryan. Davis was also nominated for CMA's Song of the Year with "Buy Dirt" featuring Luke Bryan, and won Song of the Year. Davis co-wrote the single "Broken Umbrella" by Jojo Mason.

In November 2022, Davis performed at the halftime show at the 109th Grey Cup in Regina, Saskatchewan alongside Tyler Hubbard and Josh Ross. It was also in this year that Davis released singles including "What My World Spins Around", "Next Thing You Know", "Midnight Crisis", "Part of It", "No Time Soon", and "Money Isn't Real", all of which would be featured on Davis' third studio album, Bluebird Days. It was also on this album that Davis' "Tucson Too Late" gained popularity and hit number one on the Billboard Country Airplay chart in May 2024.

After the release of Bluebird Days, Davis was nominated for CMA's Song of the Year, Single of the Year, and Music Video of the Year with "Next Thing You Know" in 2023. He was also nominated for ACM's Male Artist of the Year, and iHeartRadio Music Awards' Best Lyrics and Country Song of the year with "Buy Dirt".

In 2024, Davis released multiple singles including "Good News Sold", "I Ain't Sayin'", and "Know You Like That", in anticipation of his next studio album.

In 2025, Davis released the album Learn the Hard Way and performed in the United States and internationally on his Ain't Enough Road Tour.

== Personal life ==
Davis married Kristen O'Connor in 2018. They have four children. Their first daughter, Eloise, was born on October 17, 2019. Their first son, Locklan, was born on September 4, 2021 followed by their second son, Elijah, on June 14, 2023 and their second daughter, Sadie, on July 2, 2025.

== Discography ==
=== Studio albums ===
Title	Details	Peak chart positions					Certifications
Title	Details	US	US Country	AUS	CAN	UK	Certifications
Home State	Release date: March 23, 2018; Label: MCA Nashville; Formats: CD, vinyl, digital download	47	6	—	48	—	RIAA: Platinum; MC: Gold
Bluebird Days	Release date: February 17, 2023; Label: MCA Nashville; Formats: CD, vinyl, digital download	19	3	82	18	—	RIAA: Platinum; MC: Platinum
Learn the Hard Way	Release date: August 15, 2025; Label: MCA Nashville; Formats: CD, vinyl, digital download	32	6	9	59	25	

=== Extended plays ===
Title	Details	Peak chart positions			Certifications
Title	Details	US	US Country	CAN	Certifications
Jordan Davis	Release date: May 22, 2020; Label: MCA Nashville; Formats: CD, digital download	124	16	—	
Buy Dirt	Release date: May 21, 2021; Label: MCA Nashville; Formats: CD, digital download	86	11	99	MC: Platinum

=== Singles ===
==== As lead artist ====
Year	Title	Peak chart positions						Certifications	Album
Year	Title	US	US Country	US Country Airplay	CAN	CAN Country	NZ Hot	Certifications	Album
2017	"Singles You Up"	50	4	1	64	1	—	RIAA: 4× Platinum; ARIA: 2× Platinum; MC: 2× Platinum; RMNZ: Gold	Home State
2018	"Take It from Me"	46	4	2	67	4	—	RIAA: 3× Platinum; ARIA: Platinum; MC: Platinum; RMNZ: Gold	Home State
2019	"Slow Dance in a Parking Lot"	37	6	1	—	15	—	RIAA: 3× Platinum; ARIA: Platinum; MC: 2× Platinum; RMNZ: Gold	Home State
2020	"Almost Maybes"	43	7	5	60	6	—	RIAA: 2× Platinum; ARIA: Platinum; MC: Platinum	Jordan Davis
2021	"Buy Dirt" (featuring Luke Bryan)	22	1	1	23	1	—	RIAA: 5× Platinum; ARIA: 4× Platinum; BPI: Gold; MC: 8× Platinum; RMNZ: 2× Platinum	Buy Dirt and Bluebird Days
2022	"What My World Spins Around"	40	8	1	51	3	—	RIAA: 3× Platinum; ARIA: Platinum; MC: 3× Platinum; RMNZ: Gold	Bluebird Days
2023	"Next Thing You Know"	23	7	2	35	1	—	RIAA: 2× Platinum; ARIA: 2× Platinum; BPI: Silver; MC: 3× Platinum; RMNZ: Platinum	Bluebird Days
2023	"Tucson Too Late"	71	13	1	—	2	—	RIAA: Platinum; MC: Gold	Bluebird Days
2024	"I Ain't Sayin'"	58	12	2	63	1	—	RIAA: Gold; ARIA: Gold	Learn the Hard Way
2025	"Bar None"	37	6	2	38	1	—		Learn the Hard Way
2025	"Turn This Truck Around"	57	11	2	60	1	—		Learn the Hard Way
2026	"Mess"	— (Note: "Mess" did not enter the Billboard Hot 100, but peaked at number 2 on the Bubbling Under Hot 100 chart.)	33	39	—	53	—		Non-album single
"—" denotes a release that did not chart.

==== As featured artist ====
Year	Title	Peak chart positions					Album
Year	Title	US	US Country	US Country Airplay	CAN	CAN Country	Album
2025	"Ain't a Bad Life" (Thomas Rhett featuring Jordan Davis)	53	14	2	88	3	About a Woman (Deluxe)

==== Promotional singles ====
Year	Title	Certifications	Album
2019	"Trouble Town"		Non-album single
2019	"Cool Anymore" (featuring Julia Michaels)	RIAA: Gold; MC: Gold	Jordan Davis
2020	"Detours"		Jordan Davis
2022	"Good Beer" (with Seaforth)		What I Get for Loving You
2024	"Banks" (with Needtobreathe)		Among Friends
2024	"Buy Dirt" (with Needtobreathe)		Among Friends
2024	"Know You Like That"		Learn the Hard Way
2025	"In Case You Missed It"		Learn the Hard Way
2025	"Learn the Hard Way"		Learn the Hard Way

=== Other charted songs ===
Year	Title	Peak chart positions						Certifications	Album
Year	Title	US Bub.	US Digital	US Country	CAN	IRE	NZ Hot	Certifications	Album
2020	"Lose You"	—	26	49	—	—	—	RIAA: Gold	Buy Dirt
2025	"Ain't Enough Road"	—	—	—	—	—	33		Learn the Hard Way
2025	"O Come All Ye Faithful"	21	—	29	69	65	3		Non-album songs
2026	"Steady Flame"	—	—	—	—	—	36		Non-album songs

=== Music videos ===
Year	Video	Director
2018	"Singles You Up"	Eric Ryan Anderson
2018	"Take It from Me"	Eric Ryan Anderson
2019	"Slow Dance in a Parking Lot"	Patrick Tracy
2019	"Cool Anymore"	Eric Ryan Anderson
2020	"Detours"	Rand Smith, Tim Duggan
2020	"Church in a Chevy"	Eric Ryan Anderson
2021	"Buy Dirt" (with Luke Bryan)	
2023	"Next Thing You Know"	Stephen and Alexa Kinigopoulos
2023	"Tucson Too Late"	Harper Smith
2024	"I Ain't Sayin'"	Caleb Cockrell
2025	"Bar None"	Patrick Tracy

== Awards and nominations ==
Year	Association	Category	Nominated For	Result	Ref.
2018	Radio Disney Music Awards	Country Best New Artist	Himself	Nominated	
2019	Academy of Country Music Awards	New Male Artist of the Year	Himself	Nominated	
2019	CMT Music Awards	Breakthrough Video of the Year	"What My World Spins Around"	Nominated	
2019	iHeartRadio Music Awards	Best New Country Artist	Himself	Won	
2021	Country Music Association Awards	Musical Event of the Year	"Buy Dirt" with Luke Bryan	Nominated	
2022	Academy of Country Music Awards	Single of the Year	"Buy Dirt" with Luke Bryan	Nominated	
2022	Academy of Country Music Awards	Song of the Year	"Buy Dirt" with Luke Bryan	Nominated	
2022	Academy of Country Music Awards	Music Event of the Year	"Buy Dirt" with Luke Bryan	Nominated	
2022	American Music Awards	Favorite Country Song	"Buy Dirt" with Luke Bryan	Nominated	
2022	Billboard Music Awards	Top Country Song	"Buy Dirt" with Luke Bryan	Nominated	
2022	CMT Music Awards	Collaborative Video of the Year	"Buy Dirt" with Luke Bryan	Nominated	
2022	Country Music Association Awards	Single of the Year	"Buy Dirt" with Luke Bryan	Nominated	
2022	Country Music Association Awards	Song of the Year	"Buy Dirt" with Luke Bryan	Won	
2023	Country Music Association Awards	Single of the Year	"Next Thing You Know"	Nominated	
2023	Country Music Association Awards	Song of the Year	"Next Thing You Know"	Nominated	
2023	Country Music Association Awards	Music Video of the Year	"Next Thing You Know"	Nominated	
2023	iHeartRadio Music Awards	Country Song of the Year	"Buy Dirt" with Luke Bryan	Nominated	
2023	iHeartRadio Music Awards	Best Lyrics	"Buy Dirt" with Luke Bryan	Nominated	
2024	Academy of Country Music Awards	Single of the Year	"Next Thing You Know"	Nominated	
2024	Academy of Country Music Awards	Song of the Year	"Next Thing You Know"	Won	
2024	Academy of Country Music Awards	Visual Media of the Year	"Next Thing You Know"	Nominated	
2024	CMT Music Awards	Male Video of the Year	"Next Thing You Know"	Nominated	
2026	Country Music Association Awards	International Artist Achievement Award	Himself	Pending	
