= Out of My Hands (Green River Ordinance album) =

Out Of My Hands

Studio album by Green River Ordinance
- Released: February 24, 2009
- Genre: Alternative rock
- Length: 40:59
- Label: Virgin
- Producer: Jordan Critz, Mark Endert, Paul Ebersold

Green River Ordinance chronology
The Beauty of Letting Go (2005)	Out Of My Hands (2009)	Under Fire (2012)

Out of My Hands is the major label debut release album for Virgin Records by the band Green River Ordinance. Its sound has been compared to that of bands such as Third Eye Blind, Matchbox 20, Goo Goo Dolls, Maroon 5, Sister Hazel, and Gavin DeGraw. It peaked at #10 on the Billboard Heatseekers chart. It contains the band's single, "Come On". Another track, "Outside", was played on The Hills. "On Your Own" was aired on So You Think You Can Dance and Real World/Road Rules Challenge: The Duel 2.

Out of My Hands peaked at #10 on the Billboard Heatseekers chart. The single "Come On" reached #17 on the Billboard Adult Top 40 late in 2009; "On Your Own" reached #37 on the same chart in 2010.

The album was made available for free download from the band's Facebook page.

== Track listing ==
1. "Outside"
2. "Come On"
3. "Out of My Hands"
4. "On Your Own"
5. "Goodbye L.A."
6. "Different (Anything at All)"
7. "Learning"
8. "Last October"
9. "Sleep It Off"
10. "Getting Older"
11. "Endlessly"

== Personnel ==
=== Green River Ordinance ===
- Denton Hunker - drums, percussion
- Geoff Ice - bass guitar, background vocals
- Jamey Ice - electric guitar
- Joshua Jenkins - acoustic guitar, piano, lead vocals
- Joshua Wilkerson - electric guitar, background vocals

=== Additional musicians ===
- Jordan Critz - acoustic guitar, electric guitar, Hammond B-3 organ, piano, programming, string arrangements, strings, background vocals
- Paul Ebersold - acoustic guitar, Hammond B-3 organ, keyboards, mellotron, piano
- Mark Endert - keyboards, programming
- Anthony J. Resta - electric guitar, synthesizer
