= Jacob Davis (singer) =

- Born: Shreveport, Louisiana, U.S.
- Origin: Nashville, Tennessee, U.S.
- Genres: Country
- Occupations: Singer, songwriter
- Instrument: Vocals
- Years active: 2016-present
- Label: Black River Entertainment

Jacob Davis is an American country music singer and songwriter. A native of Shreveport, Louisiana, he is the older brother of fellow country singer Jordan Davis.

== Biography ==
Jacob Davis was born in Shreveport, Louisiana. He is the older brother of Jordan Davis, who is also a country music singer and songwriter. Jacob Davis began writing songs and playing guitar at age eleven. After graduating high school, he attended Louisiana State University and found work on an oil rig. He decided he was not satisfied with this job and instead wanted to pursue a career in music, so he moved to Nashville, Tennessee, and in 2015 secured a songwriter publishing contract.

In 2017, Davis signed to Black River Entertainment and released his debut single "What I Wanna Be", which he wrote with Adam Hambrick and Forest Glen Whitehead. Billy Dukes of Taste of Country called the song "soulful" and praised Davis's vocal phrasing. The song charted on Billboard Country Airplay, peaking at number 58 in mid-2017.

Jacob Davis has written several of his brother's singles, including "Take It from Me", "Buy Dirt", and "Tucson Too Late".
