= Maiwei =

Maiwei or Mai Wei may refer to:

- My Way (2011 film) (마이웨이, Maiwei), South Korean war film
- Lifan Maiwei, Chinese compact crossover SUV

== See also ==
- Maiwei Dihuang Wan, pill used in traditional Chinese medicine
- My Way (disambiguation)
