= My way or the highway =

My Way or the Highway may refer to:

== Music ==
- "My Way or the Highway" (skit), a musical number from the 1990 stage musical The Life (musical)

=== Albums ===
- My Way or the Highway (Chris Nielsen album), a 1988 album by Chris Nielsen (singer)
- My Way or the Highway (Guitar Shorty album), 1991
- My Way or the Highway (Tuscadero album), 1998

=== Songs ===
- "My Way or the Highway" (Y&T song), a song by Y&T off the 1982 album Black Tiger (album)
- "My Way or the Highway" (Jimmy Davis & Junction song), a song by Jimmy Davis & Junction off the soundtrack for the 1988 film A Nightmare on Elm Street 4: The Dream Master
- "My Way or the Highway" (The Razorbacks song), a song by The Razorbacks off the soundtrack for the 1991 film Highway 61 (film)
- "My Way or the Highway" (Guitar Shorty song), a song by Guitar Shorty, the title track off the eponymous 1991 album My Way or the Highway (Guitar Shorty album)
- "My Way", a song by Limp Bizkit, in which "or the highway" follows during the chorus, off their platinum-selling 2000 album Chocolate Starfish and the Hot Dog Flavored Water
- "My Way or the Highway..." (Relient K song), a song by Relient K from the 2001 album The Anatomy of the Tongue in Cheek
- "My Way Or The Highway" (The Flirtations song), a 2013 single by The Flirtations (R&B musical group)
- "My Way or the Highway" (Wolfmother song), a Wolfmother song off the 2013 soundtrack to the videogame Gran Turismo 6; see List of songs recorded by Wolfmother

== Television ==
- "My Way or the Highway" (game), a challenge game from the 2015 reality TV game show The Challenge: Battle of the Bloodlines

=== TV episodes ===
- "My Way or the Highway" (Japanese: 準決勝、超高速サーキット!, romanized: Junkesshō, Chō Kōsoku Sākitto!), 2001 episode of Beyblade (season 1)
- "My Way or the Highway", a 2013 episode of Brickleberry; see List of Brickleberry episodes
- "My Way or the Highway" (Doctors), 2004
- "My Way or the Highway", a 2017 episode of Heavy Rescue: 401
- "My Way or the Highway", a 2016 episode of Make It Pop; see List of Make It Pop episodes
- "My Way or the Highway", a 2022 episode of Restaurant: Impossible; see List of Restaurant: Impossible episodes
- "My Way or the Highway" (Scrubs), 2002

== Other uses ==
- My way or the Highway (film), a 2018 documentary; see List of Colombian documentary films
- "My Way or the Highway" (Futari Ecchi chapter) (Japanese: もう勝手にするから!, romanized: Mō katte ni suru kara!), chapter 49 of the serialized Japanese manga comic book Futari Ecchi; see List of Futari Ecchi chapters

== See also ==
- "My Way or the Highway to Heaven", a 2018 episode of The Simpsons
- My Way (disambiguation)
