= That's Just Me =

Studio album by Riley Green
- Released: September 18, 2026
- Genre: Country
- Length: 68:57
- Label: Nashville Harbor
- Producer: Dann Huff

Riley Green chronology
| Midtown Sessions (2025) | That's Just Me (2026) |

Singles from That's Just Me
- 1. "Think as You Drunk" Released: June 1, 2026

That's Just Me is the fourth studio album by American country music artist Riley Green. It was released on September 18, 2026, via Nashville Harbor Records & Entertainment. The album is produced by Dann Huff.

== Background ==
"My Way" was released as a promotional single on April 17, 2026.

Green announced That's Just Me on May 28, 2026, the same day he released the album's lead single, "Think as You Drunk".

Green then released "Go Again" featuring Hannah MacFarland on July 3, 2026 as the album's second promotional single.

"Imagine That" was release on July 31, 2026, as the album's third promotional single.

== Track listing ==
That's Just Me track listing
| No. | Title | Writer(s) | Length |
|---|---|---|---|
| 1. | "My Way" | Riley Green | 4:02 |
| 2. | "That's Just Me" | Green | 3:50 |
| 3. | "Don't Come Any Closer" | Green; Erik Dylan; Randy Montana | 3:28 |
| 4. | "Go Again" (featuring Hannah McFarland) | Green | 4:00 |
| 5. | "Imagine That" | Green; Ray Fulcher; Jonathan Singleton | 3:39 |
| 6. | "Get That from You" | Green; Rhett Akins; Dylan; Nick Walsh | 3:09 |
| 7. | "Bartender in Destin" | Sam Banks; Walsh | 3:14 |
| 8. | "Beach Happy" | Corey Crowder; Montana; Jeremy Stover | 3:06 |
| 9. | "Think as You Drunk" | Green; Jessi Alexander; Dylan; Scotty Emerick; Toby Keith; Wyatt McCubbin | 3:48 |
| 10. | "Well Well Whiskey" (featuring Jake Worthington) | Green | 4:06 |
| 11. | "P.O.S." | Green; Dylan; Montana; Drake White | 4:16 |
| 12. | "Runs in the Family" | Green; Alexander; Jameson Rodgers | 3:29 |
| 13. | "Pave All Them Red Dirt Roads" (featuring Brooks & Dunn) | Green; Dallas Davidson | 3:45 |
| 14. | "Lookout Mountain" (featuring Randy Owen) | Dylan; Montana; White | 3:35 |
| 15. | "Seven Second Ride" | Tucker Beathard; Jimi Bell; Singleton | 3:22 |
| 16. | "Radio Road" | Green; Dylan | 3:51 |
| 17. | "Ol' Stray Dog" | Dylan; Jon Randall | 3:30 |
| 18. | "More of a Man Than Me" | Green | 3:05 |
| 19. | "Ten Pairs of Boots" | Seth Ennis; Joe Fox; Chase McGill; Josh Miller | 3:42 |
| Total length: | | | 68:57 |

== Personnel ==
Credits are adapted from Tidal.

=== Musicians ===
- Riley Green – vocals (all tracks), foot stomp (track 19)
- Gordon Mote – Hammond B3 (1–6, 8, 10–13, 15, 18, 19), piano (2, 4, 9, 10), marimba (8), synthesizer (14), Wurlitzer electric piano (15)
- Mark Hill – bass guitar (1–3, 5, 6, 8–11, 13, 14, 18)
- Chris McHugh – drums (1–3, 5, 6, 9–11, 18), percussion (5, 6, 18)
- Kris Donegan – acoustic guitar (1, 2, 4–6, 8–14, 17, 18), electric guitar (2, 5, 6, 10, 13, 18), baritone guitar (19)
- Rob McNelley – electric guitar (1, 2, 4–6, 8, 10, 13, 15, 16, 18, 19)
- Josh Reedy – background vocals (1, 2, 5, 6, 9, 18)
- Justin Schipper – Dobro guitar (1, 6, 17), steel guitar (2, 5, 9, 18)
- Stuart Duncan – fiddle (1, 9, 11, 12, 14, 15, 18), mandolin (14)
- Justin Niebank – programming (2, 3, 8–13, 15, 16, 18, 19)
- Paul Franklin – steel guitar (3, 4, 8, 10–14, 19)
- Dann Huff – programming (3, 11); bouzouki, mandolin (3); electric guitar (5, 15, 16), acoustic guitar (8, 10, 15)
- Katlin Owen – background vocals (3, 8, 10–16, 19)
- Jerry Roe – drums (4, 8, 13, 15, 16, 19), percussion (8, 15, 19), shaker (14)
- Ilya Toshinskiy – mandolin (4, 15–17), banjo (12), acoustic guitar (15–17, 19)
- Jimmie Lee Sloas – bass guitar (4, 12, 15, 16, 19)
- Jacob Garner – acoustic guitar, Dobro guitar (7)
- Wyatt McCubbin – acoustic guitar (7)
- Erik Dylan – background vocals (7)
- Peter Ferguson – bass guitar (7)
- Quinn Stanphill – drums (7)
- Toby Keith – additional vocals (9)
- Mickey Raphael – harmonica (10)

=== Technical ===
- Dann Huff – production (1–6, 8–19)
- Erik Dylan – production (7), associate production (1–6, 8–19)
- Drew Bollman – engineering (1, 2, 4–6, 9, 12, 15–19), mixing (1–6, 8, 10–19), additional mixing (9)
- Steve Marcantonio – engineering (3, 8, 10, 11, 13, 14)
- Skyler Chuckry – engineering (7)
- Grant Wilson – vocal engineering (10)
- Chris Vanoverberghe – engineering assistance (1, 2, 4–6, 8, 9, 12–19)
- Joey Stanca – engineering assistance (3, 10, 11)
- Carly Smith – engineering assistance (7)
- Justin Niebank – mixing (1–6, 8–16, 18, 19)
- Luke Dejaynes – mixing (7)
- Adam Ayan – mastering (1–6, 8–16, 18, 19)
- Will Borza – mastering (7)
- Nathan Dantzler – mastering (17)
- Harrison Tate – mastering assistance (17)
- Chris Small – digital editing
- Mike Griffith – production coordination (1–6, 8–19)
- Rose Hutcheson – production coordination (1–6, 8–16, 18)
- Juanita Copeland – production coordination (7)
- Jimmy Harnen – executive production
- Scott Borchetta – executive production

== Charts ==
Chart performance for That's Just Me
| Chart (2026) | Peak position |
|---|---|
| Australian Albums (ARIA) | 14 |
| Australian Country Albums (ARIA) | 2 |
| Canadian Albums (Billboard) | 14 |
| New Zealand Albums (RMNZ) | 37 |
| Scottish Albums (Official Charts) | 25 |
| UK Albums Sales (Official Charts) | 29 |
| UK Country Albums (Official Charts) | 2 |
| US Billboard 200 | 3 |
| US Top Country Albums (Billboard) | 2 |
