= I Did It My Way =

I Did It My Way may refer to:

== Music ==
=== Lyrics ===
- "I did it my way", a lyric from the Paul Anka song My Way, most popularly the 1969 version sung by Frank Sinatra
- "I did it 'My Way'", a lyric from the Bon Jovi 2000 song It's My Life (Bon Jovi song)

=== Songs ===
- "I Did It My Way", a 2002 song by Jay-Z off the album The Blueprint 2: The Gift & The Curse

== Literature ==
- I Did It My Way, 1970 autobiography of UK orchestral band leader Billy Cotton
- Hawk: I Did It My Way, an autobiography about baseball player Ken Harrelson ghostwritten by Jeff Snook
- Jackie: I Did It My Way, a 2006 autobiography by journalist Jackie Fullerton
- "I did it my way", a series of newspaper articles in the 'Sunday Australian' written by John Groton; see Gorton government
- "I Did It My Way", a phrase on the tombstone of journalist Freeman Fulbright

== Stage and screen ==
- I Did It My Way (film), a 2023 Cantonese-language Hong Kong crime-drama feature film produced by and starring Andy Lau
- "I Did It My Way", 2022 season 2 episode 7 number 13 of Indian TV show Masaba Masaba

== See also ==
- My Way (disambiguation)
