= Think as You Drunk =

2026 song by Riley Green

Single by Riley Green

from the album That's Just Me
- Released: June 1, 2026
- Recorded: October 28, 2025
- Studio: Sound Stage, Nashville
- Genre: Country
- Length: 3:49
- Label: Nashville Harbor
- Songwriters: Riley Green; Jessi Alexander; Erik Dylan; Wyatt McCubbin; Scotty Emerick; Toby Keith
- Producer: Dann Huff

Riley Green singles chronology
"If I Don't Leave I'm Gonna Stay" (2026)	"Think as You Drunk" (2026)

Music video
- "Think as You Drunk" on YouTube

"Think as You Drunk" is a song by American country music singer Riley Green. It was released on June 1, 2026, as the lead single from his fourth studio album, That's Just Me, via Nashville Harbor Records & Entertainment. Green co-wrote the song with Jessi Alexander, Erik Dylan, and Wyatt McCubbin, and it was produced by Dann Huff. The song features a sample of Toby Keith's "As Good as I Once Was", and as such, Keith and Scotty Emerick are credited as additional co-writers.

== Background ==
Green first teased "Think as You Drunk" on May 25, 2026, after posting about the song on social media alongside the song's May 28, 2026, release date. On May 28, he also announced his fourth studio album, That's Just Me.

Green co-wrote the song with Jessi Alexander, Erik Dylan, and Wyatt McCubbin in 20 minutes. The song is a nod to Toby Keith, who is featured on the track via a sample of "As Good as I Once Was" at the end of the song. Green recorded the song with producer Dann Huff at Sound Stage in Nashville on October 28, 2025.

A portion of the proceeds from the song will be donated to the Toby Keith Foundation, which goes towards pediatric cancer patients.

Country music singer Tyler Filmore's wife criticized the track for copying Filmore's song, "Drunk I Am", and claimed that Green blocked her on social media after she called him out. Side-by-side comparisons of the two songs show that they are different in their melodies and production.

== Commercial performance and critical reception ==
James Daykin of Entertainment Focus described the song as "less like a standalone single and more like the beginning of another significant chapter for Riley Green—one that [honors] country music's past while continuing to push his own career forward". The song was met with widespread praise from fans.

"Think as You Drunk" debuted at 31 on the Billboard Country Airplay chart with 112 first-week adds.

== Music video ==
The music video for "Think as You Drunk" premiered on July 9, 2026, and was directed by Wes Edwards.

== Personnel ==
Credits adapted from Tidal.

=== Musicians ===
- Riley Green – lead vocals
- Toby Keith – sample vocals
- Dann Huff – electric guitar
- Rob McNelley – electric guitar
- Kris Donegan – acoustic guitar
- Mark Hill – bass
- Gordon Mote – Hammond organ, piano
- Justin Schipper – steel guitar
- Stuart Duncan – fiddle
- Chris McHugh – drums
- Josh Reedy – background vocals
- Justin Niebank – programming

=== Technical ===
- Dann Huff – production
- Adam Ayan – mastering
- Justin Niebank – mixing
- Drew Bollman – recording, assistant mixing
- Chris Small – editing
- Chris Vanoverberghe – assistant recording
- Scott Borchetta – executive production
- Jimmy Harnen – executive production

== Charts ==
Weekly chart performance for "Think as You Drunk"
Chart (2026)	Peak position
Canada Hot 100 (Billboard)	48
Canada Country (Billboard)	2
US Billboard Hot 100	31
US Country Airplay (Billboard)	6
US Hot Country Songs (Billboard)	11

== Release history ==
Release dates and formats for "Think as You Drunk"
Region	Date	Format	Label(s)	Ref.
United States	June 1, 2026	Country radio	Nashville Harbor	
