= My Way (disambiguation) =

"My Way" is a 1969 song popularized by Frank Sinatra.

My Way may also refer to:

== Film and television ==
- My Way (1973 film), a South African film directed by Emil Nofal
- My Way, a 1974 film directed by Kaneto Shindo
- My Way (2011 film), a South Korean war film by Kang Je-gyu
- My Way (2012 film) or Cloclo, a French biographical film about Claude François
- My Way: The Rise and Fall of Silvio Berlusconi, a 2016 documentary narrated by Alan Friedman
- "My Way" (Phil of the Future), a television episode

== Music ==
=== Albums ===
- My Way (Akufen album) or the title song, 2002
- My Way (Billy Eckstine album) or the title song, 1966
- My Way (Eddie Cochran album) or the title song (see below), 1964
- My Way (Frank Sinatra album) or the title song (see top), 1969
  - My Way: The Best of Frank Sinatra, 1997
- My Way (Gene Ammons album), 1971
- My Way (Herman Brood album), 2001
- My Way (Ian Brown album), 2009
- My Way (Lady Saw album) or the title song, 2010
- My Way (Lester Bowie album), 1990
- My Way (M. Pokora album), 2016
- My Way (Major Harris album), 1975
- My Way (EP), by Rage, 2016
- My Way (Shirley Kwan album), 1994
- My Way (Usher album) or the title song (see below), 1997
- My Way (Willie Nelson album), 2018
- My Way, by Air, 2002
- My Way, by Hins Cheung, 2002
- My Way, by Ngô Thanh Vân, 2005
- My Way, by Paul Jones, 1966
- My Way, by Skazi, 2012

=== Songs ===
- "My Way" (Calvin Harris song), 2016
- "My Way" (Eddie Cochran song), 1963
- "My Way" (Fetty Wap song), 2015
- "My Way" (Limp Bizkit song), 2001
- "My Way" (Olivia Rodrigo song), 2026
- "My Way" (Riley Green song), 2026
- "My Way" (Tone Sekelius song), 2022
- "My Way" (Usher song), 1998
- "My Way: Ulala", by Dream, 2010
- "My Way", by Aaron Pritchett from Something Goin' On Here, 2003
- "My Way", by Alien Beat Club, 2009
- "My Way", by AOA from New Moon, 2019
- "My Way", by Ateez from Treasure EP.1: All to Zero, 2018
- "My Way", by Ava Max, 2018
- "My Way", by Bone Thugs from New Waves, 2017
- "My Way", by Butch Walker from Left of Self-Centered, 2002
- "My Way", by CL from Alpha, 2021
- "My Way", by Danny! from The College Kicked-Out, 2004
- "My Way", by Day6 from The Decade, 2025
- "My Way", by Def Tech, 2004
- "My Way", by Dinosaur Pile-Up from I've Felt Better, 2025
- "My Way", by Ella Mai from Ready, 2017
- "My Way", by Jaywon from Oba Orin, 2016
- "My Way", by Jimmy Prime from Bleeding Bull, 2017
- "My Way", by Kanye West from Get Well Soon, 2002
- "My Way", by Katseye from SIS (Soft Is Strong), 2024
- "My Way", by Kiss from Crazy Nights, 1987
- "My Way", by Logic from Bobby Tarantino III, 2021
- "My Way", by Los Lonely Boys from Sacred, 2006
- "My Way", by Nas from The Lost Tapes, 2002
- "My Way", by Noah Cyrus and One Bit, 2017
- "My Way", by Q ARE from EGO, 2024
- "My Way", by Rage from The Devil Strikes Again, 2016
- "My Way", by Thandi Phoenix, 2018
- "My Way", by Tom Walker from What a Time to Be Alive, 2019
- "My Way", by Tyga, 2017
- "My Way", by Wande Coal from Wanted, 2015
- "My Way", by Yeat from ADL, 2026
- "My Way", by Young Noble and Gage Gully from The Year of the Underdogz, 2013
- "My Way", by Yuqi from Yuq1, 2024

== Other uses ==
- MyWay (ticketing system), a contactless public transport ticketing system in Canberra, Australia
- MyWay Searchbar or MyWay Speedbar or MyWay Search Assistant, a computer browser hijacker
- My Way Film Company Limited, a Hong Kong film production and distribution company
- My Way, a 1981 autobiography by Robert Muldoon
- MyWay Airlines, an airline based in Tbilisi, Georgia

== See also ==
- I Did It My Way (disambiguation)
- My way or the highway (disambiguation)
