= My Way (Riley Green song) =

2026 song by Riley Green

Promotional single by Riley Green

from the album That's Just Me
- Released: April 17, 2026
- Genre: Country
- Length: 4:02
- Label: Nashville Harbor
- Songwriter: Riley Green
- Producer: Dann Huff

Lyric video
- "My Way" on YouTube

"My Way" is a song by American country music singer Riley Green. It was released on April 17, 2026, as a promotional single from his upcoming fourth studio album, That's Just Me. It was written by Green himself and produced by Dann Huff. Green performed the song on the television series Marshals, where he portrayed the character Garrett.

== Background ==
Riley Green began teasing the song in early 2025, through sharing acoustic performances on social media. Upon its release, many have speculated that the song may be about fellow country singer Ella Langley, his rumored ex-girlfriend, due to the lyrics "A little bit of red wine poured into coffee cups", which has been noted to be very similar to a line from Langley's song "You & Me Time" ("Put a little bit of red wine in a coffee cup").

In 2026, Green made his acting debut on Marshals as the former Navy SEAL Garrett. When given the opportunity to perform a song in his second appearance in the series, Green chose "My Way" because the lyrics best reflected his character's story. He felt more comfortable filming his performance than the other scenes, which he likened to filming a music video.

== Composition ==
The song features an undulating, minimal acoustic guitar and fiddle. Riley Green croons about pining to reconcile with his ex-lover, singing that he would be back with her if he had his way. He imagines rekindling their romance, detailing moments such as watching the sunset together and dancing to an Al Green record by the fireplace.

== Critical reception ==
The song received generally positive reviews. Maxim Mower of Holler described the song as "the epitome of an artist who knows where his strengths lie. He doesn't try and overdo it or show off his vocals, rather, he meets the track where it is, and keeps the atmosphere low-key and intricate throughout." Lauren Jo Black of Country Now remarked that Riley Green's vocals convey the song's heartbreak "perfectly, while the simple, understated production only deepens the song's heartfelt feel." Jessica Nicholson of Billboard commented "The song is understated, and he keeps his vocal delivery relaxed and conversational, never stretching beyond what the song calls for." Holler's Soda Canter wrote "it is hard not to suspect that on new single 'My Way,' Riley Green knows exactly how to make use of his, ahem, many talents. The longing stare is intentional, the charm well-practiced, and the result is a smoldering reminder that Conway Twitty's long-lusted approach is alive and well." He also described the song as "quintessential Green, pairing descriptive storytelling with the unfiltered reflections on love lost that have become his bread and butter."

== Charts ==
Chart performance for "My Way"
Chart (2026)	Peak position
New Zealand Hot Singles (RMNZ)	14
US Billboard Hot 100	60
US Hot Country Songs (Billboard)	17
