= Lifan Maiwei =

Chinese compact crossover

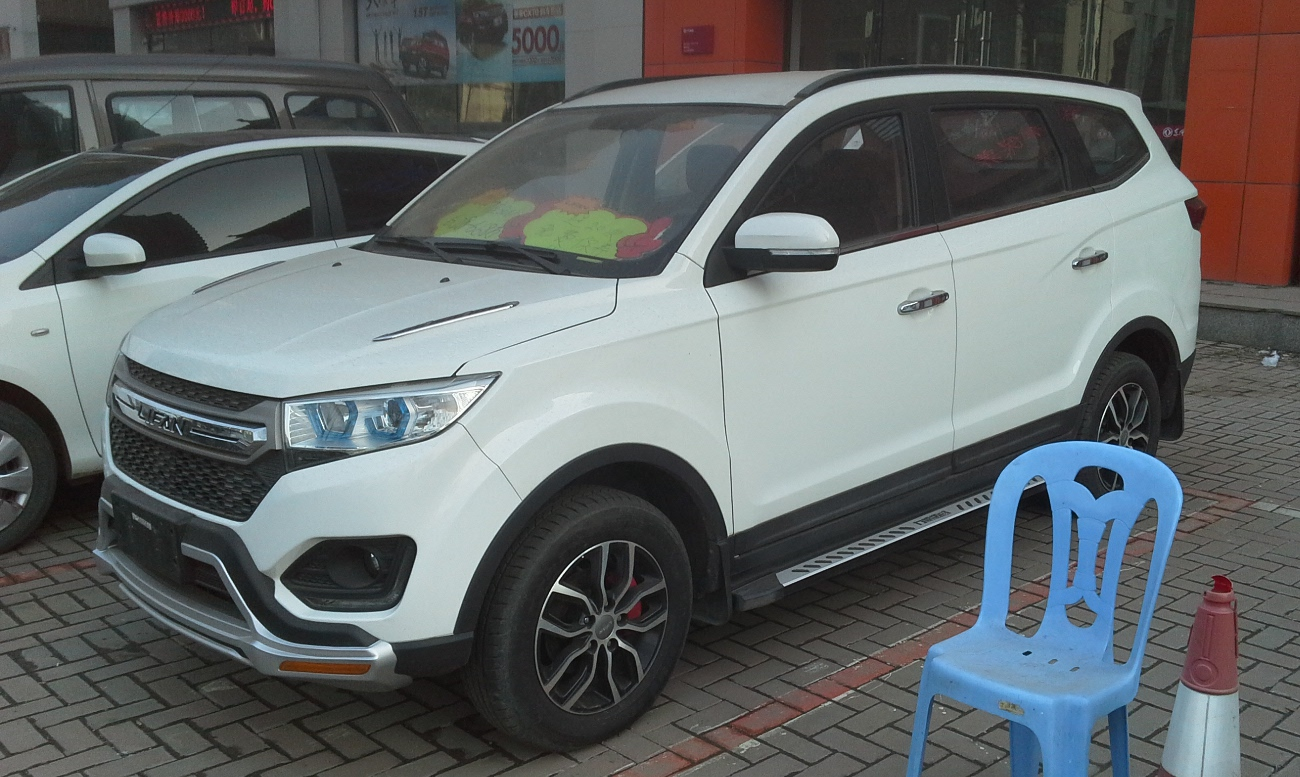

Overview
- Manufacturer: Lifan Motors, part of Lifan Group
- Production: 2016–2020
- Assembly: Chongqing, China

Body and chassis
- Class: Compact crossover SUV
- Body style: 5-door wagon

Powertrain
- Engine: 1.5 L I4 petrol engine
- Transmission: 5-speed manual; 4-speed automatic

Dimensions
- Wheelbase: 2,720 mm (107.1 in)
- Length: 4,440 mm (174.8 in)
- Width: 1,760 mm (69.3 in)
- Height: 1,730 mm (68.1 in)

The Lifan Maiwei (Chinese: 迈威) is a Chinese five-door compact crossover SUV produced by the Lifan Motors, division of Lifan Group. The Lifan Maiwei initially debuted on the 2016 Beijing Auto Show.

== Overview ==
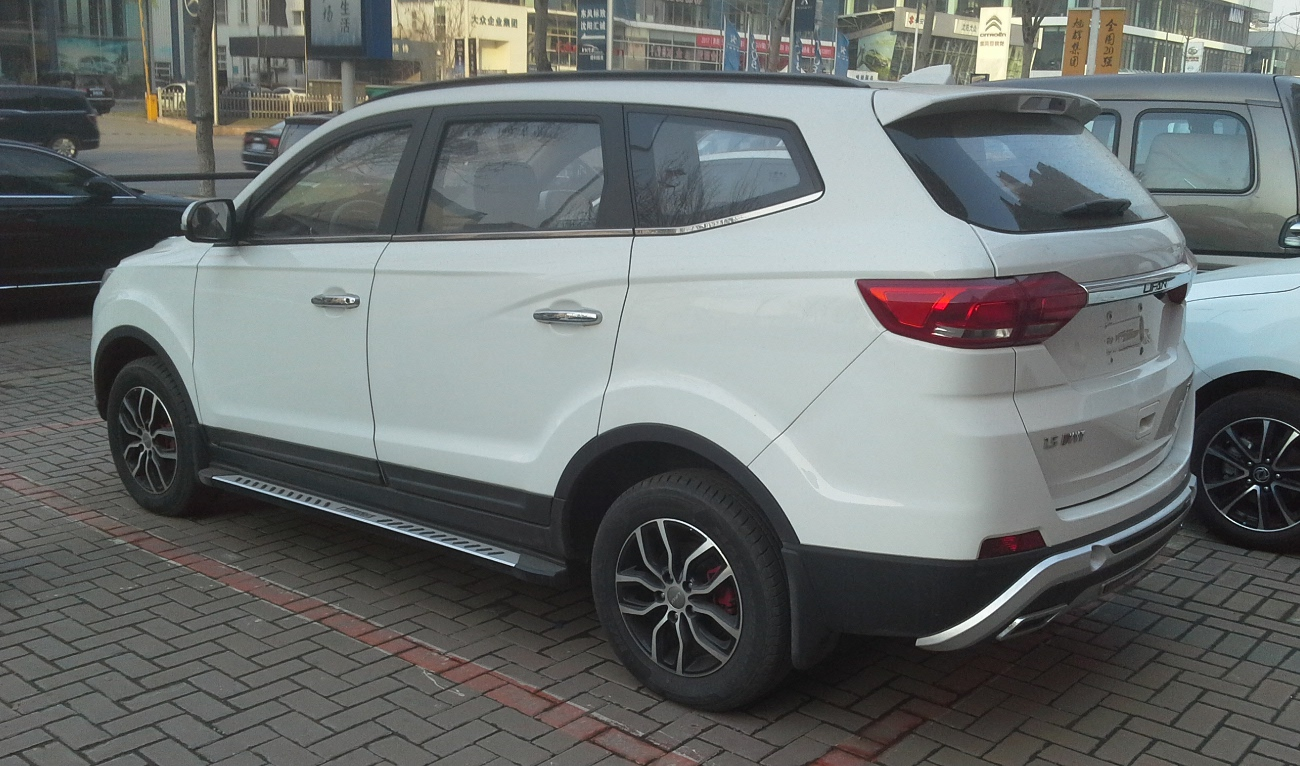
Lifan Maiwei rear

It is powered by a 4-cylinder 1.5 L engine producing 107 kW (145 PS; 143 bhp) and torque of 145 N⋅m (107 lb⋅ft), mated to a five-speed manual gearbox or a four-speed automatic gearbox. Price range of the Lifan Maiwei is between 56,800 yuan to 73,800 yuan.
