= List of Futari Ecchi chapters =

First volume cover, released in Japan in August 1997 by Hakusensha

This is a list of the chapters and volumes of the manga series Futari Ecchi by Katsu Aki. The series premiered in Young Animal in December 1996, where it is still on-going. The individual chapters are collected and published in tankōbon volumes by Hakusensha, with the first volume released in August 1997. Many of the chapters are stand-alone pieces, enabling them to be read in any order. As such, they are often rearranged when published in the volume releases. In addition to the main chapters, the series has extra unnumbered chapters called "Specials." Some of these extra chapters have been serialized in Young Animal, but the majority have been released in a sister publication Young Animal Arashi.

As of August 2025, 93 volumes have been published in Japan. In December 2002, a side story called Futari Ecchi for Ladies began serialization in Silky, running for twelve chapters until its conclusion in October 2004. The individual chapters were collected and published in two tankōbon volumes by Hakusensha. Another side story titled Futari Ecchi Gaiden: Akira, The Evangelist of Sex (ふたりエッチ外伝 性の伝道師アキラ) ran in Young Animal in 2017 and was compiled into one volume.

Tokyopop licensed Futari Ecchi for an English language release in North America under the name Manga Sutra – Futari H in 2008, with two volumes of the original Japanese release combined into a single volume for the Tokyopop release. The first of these combined volumes was released January 8, 2008. Tokyopop ceased all manga publishing in 2011, leaving only four volumes having been released, comprising eight of the Japanese volumes. Futari Ecchi is also licensed for release in France by Pika Édition, with 50 volumes released before the cancellation of the series.

== Volume list ==
=== 1997 ===
No.	Original release date	Original ISBN	English release date	English ISBN
1	August 29, 1997	978-4-592-13461-9	January 8, 2008	978-1-4278-0536-2
001. "First Impressions" (お見合い...それから♡, "Omiai... sorekara"); 002. "Lost Virginity" (ロストバージンについて, "Rosuto bājin ni tsuite"); 003. "Their First Time" (そして...初体験, "Soshite... hatsu taiken"); 004. "Lesson Number One" (2人のレッスンスタート♡, "2 hito no ressun sutāto"); 005. "Physical Intimacy" (スキンシップ♡, "Sukin shippu"); 006. "A Honeymoon for Four" (ふたりのハネムーン!?, "Futari no hanemūn!?"); 007. "In the Morning" (モーニングもOK?, "Mōningu mo OK?"); 008. "Rika's Observation" (梨香の観察☆, "Rika no kansatsu"); 009. "How Many Times Can You Do It?" (チャレンジは何度まで!?, "Charenji wa nando made"); 010. "Rika's Solution for Premature Ejaculation" (梨香の"早漏"克服法, "Rika no "sōrō" kokufuku hō")
2	December 17, 1997	978-4-592-13462-6	January 8, 2008	978-1-4278-0536-2
011. "Men You Can't Stand" (どーいう男がイヤですか?, "Dōiu otoko ga iya desu ka?"); 012. "In Sickness and In Health" (風邪だって...したくなる!?, "Kaze datte... shitaku naru!?"); 013. "Riding Cowgirl" (騎乗位...って!?, "Kijōi... tte!?"); 014. "The Power of A Hot Kiss" (熱いキスで興奮するの♡, "Atsui kisu de kōfun suru no"); 015. "A Love Hotel" (ラブホテルで!?, "Rabu hoteru de!?"); 016. "Explosive Loving" (夏の花火は開放的!?, "Natsu no hanabi wa kaihō teki!?"); 017. "Rika's Lovers" (梨香の恋人たち-♡, "Rika no koibito tachi"); 018. "Meet the Onodas" (小野田家勢揃い☆, "Onoda ie seizoroi"); 019. "The Wide World of Breasts" (オッパイのいろいろ, "Oppai no iru iru"); 020. "The Secret to Lasting Longer" (長持ちさせる方法, "Nagamochi saseru hōhō")

=== 1998 ===
No.	Original release date	Original ISBN	English release date	English ISBN
3	March 27, 1998	978-4-592-13463-3	May 13, 2008	978-1-4278-0537-9
021. "Are You Good or Bad at Sex?" (SEXうまい? 下手?, "Sex umai? Heta?"); 022. "No Doggy-Style, Please, Makoto-san" (バックはダメよ!真さん, "Bakku wa dame yo! Makoto san"); 023. "No Cheating Hearts" (浮気はしないもん☆, "Uwaki wa shinai mon"); 024. "Their First Christmas Eve" (はじめてのクリスマスイブ♥, "Hajimete no kurisumasu ebu"); 025. "A Woman's Nakedness Is Mysterious" (女性の裸は神秘的♡, "Josei no hadaka wa shinbi teki"); 026. "Does Lingerie Turn Men On?" (男は下着でもコーフンする!?, "Otoko wa shitagi demo kōfun suru!?"); 027. "On Becoming an Easy Woman" (つごーのいい女になってる!?, "Tsugō no ii onna ni natteru!?"); 028. "Fingering for Hime-Hajime" (姫はじめでフィンガーテクニック, "Hime hajime de fingā tekenikku"); 029. "Jun-chan's Thrills on the Hill" (淳ちゃんのドキドキナイト☆, "Jun-chan no doki doki naito"); 030. "Women Do It Too" (女性もサービスしてる!?, "Josei mo sābisu shiteru!?")
4	July 29, 1998	978-4-592-13464-0	May 13, 2008	978-1-4278-0537-9
031. "Impotent Makoto" (真!!たたなくなっちゃった!?, "Makoto!! Tatanaku nacchatta!?"); 032. "How to Give Head" (HOW TO おフェラ♡, "How to o feu"); 033. "I Can Do It Because I Love You" (好きだからできちゃうの♡, "Suki dakara dekichau no"); 034. "Just Us on Our Day Off" (休日は2人きり♡, "Kyūjitsu wa 2 hitokiri"); 035. "Jun-chan's First Time" (淳ちゃんの初体験-♡, "Jun-chan no hatsu taiken"); 036. "Sexual Timing" (エッチのタイミング, "Ecchi no taimingu"); 037. "Surprise Roommate" (ドキドキ同居生活♡, "Doki doki dōkyo seikatsu"); 038. "Men Are Sexual Beings" (男はHな生き物で☆, "Otoko wa H na namaki mono de"); 039. "Sexless for How Long?" (いつまでセックスレス!?, "Itsumade sekkusuresu!?"); 040. "Introducing Gynecologist Kyouko" (女医杏子登場♡, "Joi Kyōko dōjō")
5	October 29, 1998	978-4-592-13465-7	September 16, 2008	978-1-4278-0538-6
041. "Kitchen Love" (キッチン♡プレイはどう!?, "Kicchin burei wa dō!?"); 042. "Double the Date, Double the Love" (Wデートはラブラブ♡, "W jīdo wa rabu rabu"); 043. "A Long Business Trip" (2週間の出張☆, "2 shūkan no shuchō"); 044. "Her First Time Alone" (優良さんだってひとりエッチ♡, "Yūra san datte hitori ecchi"); 045. "When Cheaters Attack" (杉山さんの猛アタック☆, "Sugiyama san no mō"); 046. "Half My Heart" (心が半分♡, "Kokoro ga hanbun"); 047. "Lovers Forever" (ふたりはずっと恋人どおし♡, "Futari wa zutto koibito dōshi"); 048. "Their First 69" (はじめての"69"♡♡, "Hajime de no '69'"); 049. "My Way or the Highway" (もう勝手にするから!, "Mō katte ni suru kara!"); 050. "Camisole Crazy" (キャミソールって...☆, "Kyamisōru tte")

=== 1999 ===
No.	Original release date	Original ISBN	English release date	English ISBN
6	February 25, 1999	978-4-592-13466-4	September 16, 2008	978-1-4278-0538-6
051. "Welcome to the Neighborhood, Yubuki-san" (隣の矢吹さん♡, "Tonari no Yabuki-san"); 052. "Rika the Sex Coach" (梨香ちゃん伝授する!!, "Rika-chan denju suru!!"); 053. "Do You Know Your Shijuhatte" (四十八手を知っていますか?, "Shijuhatte o shitte imasu ka?"); 054. "Yura's Challenge" (優良さんのチャレンジ☆, "Yūra san no charenji"); 055. "Curious Jun" (淳ちゃんの好奇心♡, "Jun-chan no kōkishin"); 056. "You Only Get One First Time" (一度きりの「はじめて」♡, "Ichido kiri no (hajimete)"); 057. "Valentine, You're My Number One" (バレンタイン☆君が一番♡, "Barentain kimi ga ichiban"); 058. "Why Do I Even Like Him?" (なんで好きなんだろ!?, "Nande suki nan daro!?"); 059. "Their First Fight" (はじめてのケンカ☆, "Hajimete no kenka"); 060. "Wordplay" (言葉で感じさせて♡, "Kotoba de kanji sasete")
7	May 28, 1999	978-4-592-13467-1	January 6, 2009	978-1-4278-1275-9
061. "Makoto's Birthday" (真の誕生日--☆, "Makoto no tanjōbi"); 062. "It Takes All Kinds of Couples" (夫婦それぞれ♥, "Fūfu sore zore"); 063. "Your Breasts Feel So Good" (君の胸はキモチいい♡, "Kimi no mune wa mochi ii"); 064. "Jealousy Makes the Heart Grow Fonder" (やきもち妬いちゃう?, "Yaki mochi yai chau?); 065. "In Search of True Love" (ほんとの恋ってなあに?, "Honto no koi tte nāni?); 066. "Drunk During Hanami" (花見で酔っぱらっちゃった♥, "Hanami de yopparatchatta ♥"); 067. "Yura Gets Aggressive" (積極的に...!?, "Sekkyokutekini...!?"); 068. "Their First Anniversary" (ふたりの結婚記念日☆, "Futari no kekkon kinenbi ☆"); 069. "Boys Like Dress-Up Best" (コスプレは男の願望!?); 070. "That Thing Called Orgasm" (オーガズムって!?, "Ōgazumu tte!?")
8	August 27, 1999	978-4-592-13468-8	January 6, 2009	978-1-4278-1275-9
071. "I Don't Want to Go Home" (帰りたくないの♡, "Kaeritakunai no ♡"); 072. "Happy Loving to You" (いい恋しなよ♡, "Ī koishi teru yo ♡"); 073. "Gone Baby Gone" (いなくなった優良さん!!, "Inaku natta Yūra-san!!"); 074. "Yura's Mother" (優良さんのお母さん☆, "Yūra-san no okāsan ☆"); 075. "Molester Alert" (痴漢はキケン!!, "Chikan wa kiken!!"); 076. "Beautifully Proportioned" (ビューティフル プロポーション, "Byūtifuru Puropōshon"); 077. "Back to Nature" (大自然にかえってみよう♡, "Dai shizen ni kaette miyou ♡"); 078. "Jun's Path to Love" (淳ちゃんの恋の行方♡, "Jun-chan no koi no yukue ♡"); 079. "Bun in the Oven" (優良さん!!妊娠しちゃった!?, "Yūra-san!! Ninshin shi chatta!?"); 080. "Massage Oil Hanky-Panky" (ローションプレイはいかが!?, "Rōtēshonpurei wa iyadesu!?")
9	November 29, 1999	978-4-592-13469-5	May 12, 2009 (cancelled)	978-1-4278-1276-6
081. "Makoto no nyūin seikatsu ☆" (真の入院生活☆); 082. "Itsumonara..." (いつもなら...); 083. "Atashi... Miryoku naidesu ka?" (あたし...魅力ないですか?); 084. "Futari no nettaiya ♡" (ふたりの熱帯夜♡); 085. "Sutoroberī ★ hapuningu" (ストロベリー★ハプニング); 086. "Wakare chatta!? Yamada & Rika" (別れちゃったの!?山田&梨香); 087. "Yūra-san no umarekokyō ♡" (優良さんの生まれ故郷♡); 088. "Kuruma no naka wa kaihō-teki ♫" (車の中は開放的♫); 089. "Akai ito no densetsu" (赤い糸の伝説); 090. "Makoto!! Ika i!?" (真!!イカない!?)

=== 2000 ===
No.	Original release date	Original ISBN	English release date	English ISBN
10	February 29, 2000	978-4-592-13470-1	May 12, 2009 (cancelled)	978-1-4278-1276-6
091. "Hitorideshicha dame ♥" (ひとりでしちゃダメ♥); 092. "Rika no (hi) shime teku taisō" (梨香の(秘)締めテク体操); 093. "H de daietto!?" (Hでダイエット!?); 094. "Makoto-san no `genki' ni naritai na ☆" (真さんの「元気」になりたいな☆); 095. "Dō suru? Purezento ☆" (どうする? プレゼント☆); 096. "Kurisumasu ni kisu ♡♡" (クリスマスにキッス♡♡); 097. "Koe o dashita!!!" (声を出したい!!!); 098. "Josei no ki ni naru tokoro...♡" (女性の気になるところ...♡); 099. "Ecchi no senpai ☆" (エッチの先輩☆); 100. "Kekkon tte...!?" (結婚って...!?)
11	June 29, 2000	978-4-592-13471-8	—	—
101. "Serā-fuku o nugasanaide ☆" (セーラー服を脱がさないで☆); 102. "Kitaete mitara...?" (鍛えてみたら...?); 103. "Otoko ga yorokobu shitagi no nugi-kata!?" (男が喜ぶ下着の脱ぎ方!?); 104. "Kondōmu o tsukete yo! Yamada!!" (コンドームをつけてよ!山田!!); 105. "Nan'nimo mienai ♡" (なんにも見えない♡); 106. "Keiken hōfuna Matsuzaki-kun" (経験豊富な松崎くん); 107. "Ī okusan ni naritai no ♡♡" (いい奥さんになりたいの♡♡); 108. "Otoko o miru me... Nai no ka nā" (男を見る目...ないのかなぁ); 109. "Shitsu kushita kekkon yubiwa!?" (失くした結婚指輪!?); 110. "Shitashiki naka ni mo zengi ari!!" (親しき仲にも前戯あり!!)
12	September 29, 2000	978-4-592-13472-5	—	—
111. "O benkyō shitadesu ne ♡♡" (お勉強したんですね♡♡); 112. "Atashi hatarakou to omou no" (あたし働こうと思うの); 113. "Ueitoresu sugata wa sosotchau!?" (ウエイトレス姿はそそっちゃう!?); 114. "Shingurumazā ni akogarete ♡" (シングルマザーに憧れて♡); 115. "Sukoshi wa iroppoku narimashita!?" (少しは色っぽくなりました!?); 116. "Bishou nure de amayadori ♡" (ビショ濡れで雨やどり♡); 117. "Manatsu no H jiman ☆" (真夏のH自慢☆); 118. "Choppiri kosodate kibun" (ちょっぴり子育て気分); 119. "Okosonai yō ni... Ne ♡" (起こさないように...ネ♡); 120. "Akachan hoshiku natchatta!?" (赤ちゃん欲しくなっちゃった!?)
13	December 18, 2000	978-4-592-13473-2	—	—
121. "Natsubate no toki wa ☆" (夏バテのときは☆); 122. "Hadaka ni natte...♡♡" (裸になって...♡♡); 123. "Jun-chan no kazoku kaigi!!" (淳ちゃんの家族会議!!); 124. "Zettai... Uwaki wa shinaikara ne...☆" (絶対...浮気はしないからね...☆); 125. "Makoto to Miyuki no dokidoki zangyō!?" (真とみゆきのドキドキ残業!?); 126. "Atashi no mune ni sawaranaide ☆☆" (あたしの胸にさわらないで☆☆); 127. "Ippai H ga shitainara...☆" (いっぱいHがしたいなら...☆); 128. "Shima no bīchi wa nanpa ga ōi ♡" (島のビーチはナンパが多い♡); 129. "Makoto ga umi de yūwaku sa reta!?" (真が海で誘惑された!?); 130. "Sunahama no romansu" (砂浜のロマンス)

=== 2001 ===
No.	Original release date	Original ISBN	English release date	English ISBN
14	April 27, 2001	978-4-592-13474-9	—	—
131. "H na bideo o toranaide ♡" (Hなビデオを録らないで♡); 132. "Yume no maihōmu ☆" (夢のマイホーム☆); 133. "Aki ♡ an'nyuina Yūra-san ♡♡" (秋♡アンニュイな優良さん♡♡); 134. "Kurisumasu... Yūra-san ni aenai!?" (クリスマス...優良さんに会えない!?); 135. "Seiya no deto wa...♫" (聖夜のデートは...♫); 136. "Teishukanpaku ni akogarete!?" (亭主関白に憧れて!?); 137. "Futari no toshikoshi kauntodaun" (ふたりの年越しカウントダウン); 138. "100-Kai-me no ♡♡♡♡♡" (100回目の♡♡♡♡♡); 139. "Rika-chan to Miyuki-chan ☆" (梨香ちゃんとみゆきちゃん☆); 140. "Shokku! Tanshin funin!!" (ショック!単身赴任!!)
15	August 29, 2001	978-4-592-13475-6	—	—
141. "Yūra-san!! Maiko-san ni henshin ♡" (優良さん!!舞妓さんに変身♡); 142. "Soba ni ite kurenakya..." (そばにいてくれなきゃ...); 143. "Mattemasu ♡ Makoto-san" (待ってます♡真さん); 144. "Yamada ga seibyō!?" (山田が性病!?); 145. "Miyuki to SEXERCISE ♫" (みゆきとSEXERCISE♫); 146. "Ma no to -me ningen!?" (真のとーめー人間!?); 147. "Baiagura ☆ panikku" (バイアグラ☆パニック); 148. "Dōsōkai de uwaki kamo...?" (同窓会で浮気かも...?); 149. "Kōkō jidai ni yari nokoshita koto ☆" (高校時代にやり残したこと☆)
16	December 19, 2001	978-4-592-13476-3	—	—
150. "Yūra-san no basu taimu ♡" (優良さんのバスタイム♡); 151. "Saigo wa... Ecchi de nakanaori??" (最後は...エッチで仲直り??); 152. "Kekkon seikatsu wa ī mono!?" (結婚生活はいいもの!?); 153. "Makoto no shōshin oiwai ♡♡" (真の昇進お祝い♡♡); 154. "Kyōko-san& Matsuzaki ☆ hatsu dēto ♡" (杏子さん&松崎☆初デート♡); 155. "Risō no josei tte... ☆" (理想の女性って...☆); 156. "Yūra-san AV o miru ♡" (優良さんAVを観る♡); 157. "Kyanpude rifuresshu ☆☆" (キャンプでリフレッシュ☆☆); 158. "Dai genka!! Yūra-san to Rika-chan ☆" (大ゲンカ!!優良さんと梨香ちゃん☆); 159. "Ecchi ni natchatta Yūra-san!!" (エッチになっちゃった優良さん!!)

=== 2002 ===
No.	Original release date	Original ISBN	English release date	English ISBN
17	April 26, 2002	978-4-592-13477-0	—	—
160. "Ah 〜☆ atsukute nemurenai" (あ〜☆暑くて眠れない); 161. "Manatsu no yoru no yume ♡" (真夏の夜の夢♡); 162. "Otoko wa sekushīna josei ga suki!?" (男はセクシーな女性が好き!?); 163. "Jun-chan no meruyū ♡♡" (淳ちゃんのメル友♡♡); 164. "Kisu no raburetā ♡" (KISSのラブレター♡); 165. "Kyōko-san no kinokokari" (杏子さんのきのこ狩り); 166. "Gikurī koshi de ecchi ga dekinai!!" (ギックリ腰でエッチができない!!); 167. "Iyashino kyabakura ☆" (癒しのキャバクラ☆); 168. "Wan wan shussan sōdō!!" (ワンワン出産騒動!!)
18	July 29, 2002	978-4-592-13478-7	—	—
169. "Mono tarina-sa kokufuku-hō" (もの足りなさ克服法); 170. "Fuji-san & Yūra-san ♡" (富士山&優良さん♡); 171. "Rika to yama to ryōshin to" (梨香と山と両親と); 172. "Min'na sorezore jinsei sekkei!!" (みんなそれぞれ人生設計!!); 173. "Sorosoro kekkon!? Kyōko-san" (そろそろ結婚!?杏子さん); 174. "Sutekina minisukāto" (すてきなミニスカート); 175. "Sutōkā ni atteru no!?" (ストーカーにあってるの!?); 176. "Makoto ga furin!? Otokotte shin'yō dekinai!" (真が不倫!?男って信用できない!!); 177. "Atatamete ageru ♡" (あっためてあげる♡)
19	October 29, 2002	978-4-592-13479-4	—	—
178. "Shiawaseda to fuan ni natchau no ♡" (幸せだと不安になっちゃうの♡); 179. "Kowagatcha dame!!" (こわがっちゃダメ!!); 180. "Tsuini o hikkoshi ☆" (ついにお引っ越し☆); 181. "Futari no shin seikatsu" (ふたりの新生活); 182. "Kon'ya wa moe-sō ♡♡♡" (今夜は燃えそう♡♡♡); 183. "Shōji-san wa kan'nō shōsetsuka ☆☆" (庄子さんは官能小説家☆☆); 184. "Ren'ai shite miyou ka na..." (恋愛してみようかな...); 185. "Aijin wa tsukuranaide ne ♡" (愛人はつくらないでね♡); 186. "Otome no chigai tte!? (男と女の違いって!?)

=== 2003 ===
No.	Original release date	Original ISBN	English release date	English ISBN
20	February 28, 2003	978-4-592-13480-0	—	—
187. "Mukashi no kotodakara..." (昔のことだから...); 188. "Futari no suizokukan ☆" (ふたりの水族館☆); 189. "Nayami ōki mesukōsei • Rui-chan ♡" (悩み多き女子高生•るいチャン♡); 190. "Adaruto• guzzu tte!?" (アダルト•グッズって!?); 191. "Nakute mo ī yo ne ♡" (なくてもいいよね♡); 192. "Miyuki to Arisa no H na sutoresu kaishō-hō" (みゆきと亜理沙のHなストレス解消法); 193. "Atashi o son'nani sawaranaide ♡" (あたしをそんなに触らないで♡); 194. "Makoto!! Rika-chan o kanbyō suru ♡♡" (真!!梨香ちゃんを看病する♡♡); 195. "Kodomo ga iru to H nante..." (子供がいるとHなんて...)
21	May 29, 2003	978-4-592-13841-9	—	—
196. "Uwasa-suki no Mizuhara-san!!" (噂好きの水原さん!!); 197. "Tameshitai ♡ orijinaru taii ♡♡" (試したい♡オリジナル体位♡♡); 198. "Saru ga kuru onsen ni ikou!" (サルがくる温泉にいこう!); 199. "O shiri... Sukoshi ōkiku natchatta!?" (お尻...少し大きくなっちゃった!?); 200. "Uketsuke jō wa chō kyonyū-chan ♡" (受付嬢は超巨乳ちゃん♡); 201. "Bōnenkai wa ōsawagi ☆" (忘年会は大騒ぎ☆); 202. "Taisetsu to daisōji ☆☆" (大雪と大掃除☆☆); 203. "Makoto-san ni onihasoto!!" (真さんに鬼は外!!); 204. "Otokonoko on'nanoko umi wake-hō ☆" (男の子女の子生み分け法☆)
22	August 29, 2003	978-4-592-13842-6	—	—
205. "Kanjinakucha dame ☆" (感じなくちゃダメ☆); 206. "Matsuzaki-kun to Kyōko-san tsuini hakyoku!?" (松崎くんと杏子さんついに破局!?); 207. "Ano koe ga ōkī no ♡♡" (あの声が大きいの♡♡); 208. "Koishi teru ndesu ♡♡" (恋してるんです♡♡); 209. "Rui-chan • o toshigoro ☆☆" (るいちゃん•お年頃☆☆); 210. "Shunmin akatsuki wo oboezu..." (春眠暁を覚えず...); 211. "Narimi-san no ī tokoro ♡" (也実さんのいいところ♡); 212. "H na kimochi ni sa sete kure!" (Hな気持ちにさせてくれ!!); 213. "Misaki-chan to Miyuki-chan ☆" (美咲ちゃんとみゆきちゃん☆)
23	December 19, 2003	978-4-592-13843-3	—	—
214. "Onoda-san to nara" (小野田さんとなら); 215. "Shiawase ni narō ♡♡" (幸せになろう♡♡); 216. "Makoto-san o mite itai no ♡" (真さんを見ていたいの♡); 217. "Narimi-san no yūwaku ☆" (也実さんの誘惑☆); 218. "Happīendo no ato wa..." (ハッピーエンドのあとは...); 219. "Nayameru Misaki-chan ☆ ☆" (悩める美咲ちゃん☆☆); 220. "Buraidaru wa ōisogashi!!!" (ブライダルは大忙し!!!); 221. "Omoidashi chau ♡ uedingu ♡♡" (思いだしちゃう♡ウエディング♡♡); 222. "Uwaki shi chau zo!!" (浮気しちゃうぞ!!)

=== 2004 ===
No.	Original release date	Original ISBN	English release date	English ISBN
24	March 29, 2004	978-4-592-13844-0	—	—
223. "Gōkon ☆ Getto sakusen" (合コン☆ゲット作戦); 224. "Ichijō-san wa tottemo seiso ♡" (一条さんはとっても清楚♡); 225. "Kowaku nanka nai yo ☆" (怖くなんかないよ☆); 226. "SEX furendo yo! Sayōnara!!" (SEXフレンドよ!さようなら!!); 227. "Yūra-san no ko-tsukuri dē!!" (優良さんの子作りデー!!); 228. "Onsen wa mizugi de nyūrō ♡♡" (温泉は水着で入ろう♡♡); 229. "Rakuyō no kōen nite... (落葉の公園にて...); 230. "Misaki-chan!! Makoto no furin ni dokkidoki~tsu!" (美咲ちゃん!!真の不倫にドッキドキッ!?); 231. "Motto tanoshī ecchi o ♡♡" (もっと楽しいエッチを♡♡)
25	June 29, 2004	978-4-592-13845-7	—	—
232. "Yūra-san ni arawa rete ♡♡" (優良さんに洗われて♡♡); 233. "Shinkon no Kyōko-san ☆" (新婚の杏子さん☆); 234. "Deai wa...♡" (出会いは...♡); 235. "Ren'ai no tatsujin!!" (恋愛の達人!!); 236. "Mōsō shinai zo!!!" (妄想しないぞ!!!); 237. "Miyuki-chan 1-nichi koibito!?" (みゆきちゃん1日恋人!?); 238. "Hatsukoi no hinaningyō" (初恋のひな人形); 239. "Howaitodē wa taihen ☆ ☆" (ホワイトデーは大変☆☆); 240. "Shojona ko wa..." (処女なコは...)
26	October 29, 2004	978-4-592-13846-4	—	—
241. "Futari de raburabu massāji ♡" (ふたりでラブラブマッサージ♡); 242. "Ecchi na taiken sa sete ♡♡" (エッチな体験させて♡♡); 243. "Sakura no omoide ☆" (桜の思い出☆); 244. "Makoto-san ♡-goe o dashite ☆ ☆" (真さん♡声を出して☆☆); 245. "Jun-chan! Dōsei suru!!" (淳ちゃん!同棲する!!); 246. "Shin wa mote teru??" (真はもててる??); 247. "Dokidoki no hanami furo" (ドキドキの花見風呂); 248. "Ichijō-san ni harahara ☆ hapuningu" (一条さんにハラハラ☆ハプニング); 249. "Cherī de raburabu!?" (チェリーでラブラブ!?)

=== 2005 ===
No.	Original release date	Original ISBN	English release date	English ISBN
27	January 28, 2005	978-4-592-13847-1	—	—
250. "Tanabata ♡ randebū" (七夕♡ランデブー); 251. "Surendā no himitsu ♫" (スレンダーの秘密♫); 252. "Yūra-san ni biyaku o ♡" (優良さんに媚薬を♡); 253. "Natsubate Yūra-san ☆ kaishō-hō!!" (夏バテ優良さん☆解消法!!); 254. "Sōrō to chirō!! Dotchi ga ī!?" (早漏と遅漏!!どっちがいい!?); 255. "Hanabi no yō ni moetai no ♡♡" (花火のように燃えたいの♡♡); 256. "Pichipichi mesukōsei jijō" (ピチピチ女子高生事情); 257. "Kenkō ni natte ☆ Ichijō-san!!" (健康になって☆一条さん!!); 258. "Dezāto wa kori gori!?" (デザートはこりごり!?)
28	May 27, 2005	978-4-592-13848-8	—	—
259. "Yūra-san no nūdo shashin!!!" (優良さんのヌード写真!!!); 260. "Kachō ☆ Maki Kurumi" (課長☆牧くるみ); 261. "Miwaku no sekushīranjerī shō ♡" (魅惑のセクシーランジェリーショー♡); 262. "Kachō to denjarasu shutchō ☆☆" (課長とデンジャラス出張☆☆); 263. "35-Sai ♡ mada daijōbu!?" (35歳♡まだ大丈夫!?); 264. "Atarashī rabuhoteru ☆" (新しいラブホテル☆); 265. "Zan'nen! Hitodzuma desu!" (残念! 人妻です!!); 266. "Iyashino kyabakura PART. 2" (癒しのキャバクラPART.2); 267. "Kyō wa `tsuma no hi' ♡" (今日は「妻の日」♡)
29	August 29, 2005	978-4-592-13849-5	—	—
268. "O gibo-san mo raburabu ♡" (お義母さんもラブラブ♡); 269. "Dōtei wa nan-nen madenara Ari!" (童貞は何歳までならアリ!?); 270. "O furo ga koware chatta!!" (お風呂が壊れちゃった!!); 271. "Misaki-chan no ketsui" (美咲ちゃんの決意); 272. "Yūra-san ga shitaku naru hi ☆" (優良さんがしたくなる日☆); 273. "Joshikō kyōshi mo tsurai yo!?" (女子高教師もつらいよ!?); 274. "Neru toki... Kiru no wa..." (寝る時...着るのは...); 275. "Rui-chan papa ga saikon?" (るいちゃんパパが再婚??); 276. "Sugiyama-san no atarashī koi ☆☆" (杉山さんの新しい恋☆☆); 277. "Uiuishī!?" (初々しい!?)
30	December 20, 2005	978-4-592-13850-1	—	—
278. "Shiohigari yori rabuho ♫" (潮干狩りよりラブホ♫); 279. "Kyōko-san reberuappu ☆" (杏子さんレベルアップ☆); 280. "Uketsuke jō kudo kitai ♡♡" (受付嬢をくどきたい♡♡); 281. "Shin-tachi no undōkai" (真たちの運動会); 282. "Hin'nyū tte iwanaide ☆☆" (貧乳っていわないで☆☆); 283. "Zutto soba ni imasukara ♡" (ずーっとそばにいますから♡); 284. "Ore o shōten sa sete hoshī ♡" (おれを昇天させてほしい♡); 285. "Futari de yamaaruki ♫" (ふたりで山歩き♫); 286. "Okahama bōsō!" (岡浜暴走!!); 207. "Kon'ya wa banīgāru ♡" (今夜はバニーガール♡)

=== 2006 ===
No.	Original release date	Original ISBN	English release date	English ISBN
31	April 28, 2006	978-4-592-13851-8	—	—
288. "Katakori ga hidoi no ☆" (肩こりがひどいの☆); 289. "Ichijō-san to Rui-chan papa" (一条さんとるいちゃんパパ); 290. "Mēru de furin hakkaku!?" (メールで不倫発覚!?); 291. "Zangyō tsudzuki wa tsukare chau ☆" (残業つづきは疲れちゃう☆); 292. "Nakayoku naritai ♡" (仲良くなりたい♡); 293. "Hitodzuma purei ga shitai nda ♫" (人妻プレイがしたいんだ♫); 294. "Risō no dansei ☆ ☆" (理想の男性☆☆); 295. "Uranai o shinji chau!?" (占いを信じちゃう!?); 296. "Wasurerarenai..." (忘れられない...); 297. "Renzoku ecchi no kiroku kōshin!?" (連続エッチの記録更新!?)
32	August 29, 2006	978-4-592-13852-5	—	—
298. "Yōkoso!! Meido kissa e" (ようこそ!!メイド喫茶へ); 299. "Attohōmu ni narenakute..." (アットホームに慣れなくて...); 300. "Omisoka ☆ 2-ri kiri no onsen ryokō ♡" (大晦日☆2人っきりの温泉旅行♡); 301. "Hatsuhinode etchi o shiyou ♫" (初日の出エッチをしよう♫); 302. "Yabuki-san no akachan ☆ ☆" (矢吹さんの赤ちゃん☆☆); 303. "Mada sukina ndesu ♡♡" (まだ好きなんです♡♡); 304. "Ichaicha ga tarinai!?" (イチャイチャが足りない!?); 305. "Ichijō-san to Rui-chan papa no dokidokina ippaku ♡" (一条さんとるいちゃんパパのドキドキな一泊♡); 306. "Ima made moe tenakatta no?" (今まで燃えてなかったの?)
33	December 21, 2006	978-4-592-13853-2	—	—
307. "Jīsupotto o mitsukeyou!!!" (Gスポットを見つけよう!!!); 208. "Watanabe-kun no fuzoku taiken -sono 1-" (渡辺くんのフーゾク体験-その1-); 309. "Watanabe-kun no fuzoku taiken -sono 2-" (渡辺くんのフーゾク体験-その2-); 310. "Hoka no otoko ga ki ni naru no!?" (ほかの男が気になるの!?); 311. "Akkun to momo no raburabu nikki" (あっくんとモモのラブラブ日記); 312. "Honto no kimochi o... ☆" (ホントの気持ちを...☆); 313. "Sekkusu ni kyōmigāru no ♫" (せっくすに興味があるの♫); 314. "Jun-chan no otoko henreki ☆" (淳ちゃんの男遍歴☆); 315. "Yūra-san fuminshō?" (優良さん不眠症??)

=== 2007 ===
No.	Original release date	Original ISBN	English release date	English ISBN
34	April 27, 2007	978-4-592-13854-9	—	—
316. "San setto• kisu ♡" (サンセット•キッス♡); 317. "Yogarigoe wa min'na iroiro ☆" (よがり声はみんないろいろ☆); 318. "Meganekko Miyuki-chan ♫" (メガネっ娘みゆきちゃん♫); 319. "Watanabe-kun no sayonara dōtei ☆☆" (渡辺くんのさよなら童貞☆☆); 320. "Yūra-san wa chūmoku no mato!!!" (優良さんは注目の的!!!); 321. "Misaki-chan no omoi ☆" (美咲ちゃんの想い☆); 322. "Tamani wa shufu o yametara?" (たまには主婦をやめたら?); 323. "Atashi no mama ni natte ♡♡" (あたしのママになって♡♡); 324. "Kon'ya wa ecchi ni natte mo īdesu ka?" (今夜はエッチになってもいいですか!?); 325. "Hatsukoi no hito ni ni teru!!" (初恋のひとに似てる!!)
35	July 27, 2007	978-4-592-13855-6	—	—
326. "Shinjin OL ♡ Komatsu-kun ♫" (新人OL♡小松くん♫); 327. "Makoto-san wa daijōbu!! (Tabun)" (真さんは大丈夫!!(たぶん)); 328. "Hatsukoi wa... Omoide ☆" (初恋は...思い出☆); 329. "Shanai ren'ai wa jiyū ♡" (社内恋愛は自由♡); 330. "Ichijō-san no kako..." (一条さんの過去...); 331. "Ai o tashikameyou!!" (愛を確かめよう!!); 332. "Hajimete iki mashita ♡♡" (はじめてイキました♡♡); 333. "Matsuzaki-kun no sefure sengen!!" (松崎くんのセフレ宣言!!); 334. "Rui-chan no kokuhaku ♫" (るいちゃんの告白♫); 335. "Hitori ecchi ga suki ni natchatta!?" (ひとりエッチが好きになっちゃった!?)
36	November 29, 2007	978-4-592-13856-3	—	—
336. "Dame yo ☆ ecchi na koto kangaecha!!" (だめよ☆エッチなこと考えちゃ!!); 337. "Ecchi ni mezameta Yūra-san ♡♡" (エッチに目覚めた優良さん♡♡); 338. "Matsuzaki-kun ayamaru!!!" (松崎くんあやまる!!!); 339. "Futari tomo kazehiki-san ☆☆" (ふたりとも風邪ひきさん☆☆); 340. "On'na-darake no shutchō ryokō -sono 1-" (女だらけの出張旅行-その1-); 341. "On'na-darake no shutchō ryokō -sono 2-" (女だらけの出張旅行-その2-); 342. "Suzuka-chan to dēto!?" (鈴鹿ちゃんとデート!?); 343. "3-Nen-me no...♡♡♡" (3年目の...♡♡♡); 344. "Sorezore no shitagi jijō" (それぞれの下着事情♫); 345. "Motto iron'na etchi ga shitaidesu!!" (もっといろんなエッチがしたいです!!)
37	December 20, 2007	978-4-592-13857-0	—	—
346. "Surōsekkusu no susume -sono 1-" (スローセックスのすすめ-その1-); 347. "Surōsekkusu no susume -sono 2-" (スローセックスのすすめ-その2-); 348. "S otto to M-bi ♫" (S夫とM美♫); 349. "Suzuka-chan no kekkonsōdansho (zenpen)" (鈴鹿ちゃんの結婚相談所(前編)); 350. "Suzuka-chan no kekkonsōdansho (kōhen)" (鈴鹿ちゃんの結婚相談所(後編)); 351. "O keshō kinshi!" (お化粧禁止!!); 352. "Makoto no o kodzukai ☆☆" (真のおこづかい☆☆); 353. "Ren'ai shicha ikenai nda!" (恋愛しちゃいけないんだ!!!); 354. "Ki ni naru insutorakutā ♡" (気になるインストラクター♡); 355. "Yūra-san ni kagitte..." (優良さんに限って...)

=== 2008 ===
No.	Original release date	Original ISBN	English release date	English ISBN
38	March 28, 2008	978-4-592-13858-7	—	—
356. "Makoto no yaki mochi ♫" (真のやきもち♫); 357. "Ren'ai jiyū shugi!!" (恋愛自由主義!!); 358. "Kyūkyoku no dōji aibu ♡♡" (究極の同時愛撫♡♡); 359. "2-ri sorezore shin'nenkai ♬" (2人それぞれ新年会♪); 360. "Saigo no onegai..." (最後のお願い...); 361. "Kissu wa choko no aji ♡" (キッスはチョコの味♡); 362. "Kimi to kekkonshitai!!" (キミと結婚したい!!); 363. "Sotsugyō ♫ Rika-chan ☆" (卒業♫梨花ちゃん☆); 364. "Bōsō!! OL Rika-chan ♡" (暴走!!OL梨花ちゃん♡); 365. "Kotoba purei ttedo o!?" (言葉プレイってどお!?)
39	June 27, 2008	978-4-592-13859-4	—	—
366. "Rika-chan no hatsu shain ryokō ♡ -sono 1-" (梨花ちゃんの初社員旅行♡-その1-); 367. "Rika-chan no hatsu shain ryokō ♡ -sono 2-" (梨花ちゃんの初社員旅行♡-その2-); 368. "Min'na no Rabu Rabu chōsa ☆☆" (みんなのラブラブ調査☆☆); 369. "SM fasshon Yūra-san ♫" (SMファッション優良さん♫); 370. "Rui-chan no kon'in-todoke ♡" (るいちゃんの婚姻届♡); 371. "Kisu ma no Yayoi-san ♫♫" (キス魔の弥生さん♫♫); 372. "Kanojo wa tokubetsu...???" (彼女は特別...???); 373. "Supesharu de mirakuru de derishasuna etchi ♡♡" (スペシャルでミラクルでデリシャスなエッチ♡♡); 374. "Anogoro no wasuremono..." (あの頃の忘れ物...); 375. "Dōbutsu-san mitai ni hatsujō-ki!?" (動物さんみたいに発情期!?)
40	September 29, 2008	978-4-592-13860-0	—	—
376. "SM rūmu e yōkoso ♡♡" (SMルームへようこそ♡♡); 377. "Suki ni naru no wa jiyū ♫" (好きになるのは自由♫); 378. "Rui-chan & Watanabe-kun kekkon ♡" (るいちゃん&渡辺くん結婚♡); 379. "Makoto-san wa dorei-san ♪" (真さんは奴隷さん♪); 380. "Junshin mukuna Suzu-chan ♡♡" (純真無垢な鈴ちゃん♡♡); 381. "Otoko no `iyashi' supotto ☆☆" (男の「癒し」スポット☆☆); 382. "Miyuki-chan o hagemasō ♫" (みゆきちゃんを励まそう♫); 383. "Motto hageshiku shite hoshī ♡" (もっと激しくして欲しい♡); 384. "Nanka chigau ki ga suru!?" (なんか違う気がする!?)

=== 2009 ===
No.	Original release date	Original ISBN	English release date	English ISBN
41	January 29, 2009	978-4-592-14601-8	—	—
385. "Oku ga kanjiru no ♡♡" (奥が感じるの♡♡); 386. "Rui-chan no shinkon seikatsu ♡" (るいちゃんの新婚生活♡); 387. "Mōichido hore sasete ♡" (もう一度惚れさせて♡); 388. "Otome: SEX no aishō ☆" (男と女: SEXの相性☆); 389. "Iron'na atashi o mite ♡" (いろんなあたしを見て♡); 390. "Atashi no bājin sashiagemasu ☆" (あたしのバージン差し上げます☆); 391. "Kokoro no kyori ☆☆☆" (心の距離☆☆☆); 392. "Rui-chan bare chatta!!" (るいちゃんバレちゃった!!); 393. "Ketsuekigata betsu SEX tte!?" (血液型別SEXって!?); 394. "Anata no kodomo ga hoshī ndesu..." (あなたの子供が欲しいんです...)
42	April 28, 2009	978-4-592-14602-5	—	—
395. "Miyuki to shin no nyū yōku shutchō -sono 1-" (みゆきと真のニューヨーク出張-その1-); 396. "Miyuki to shin no nyū yōku shutchō -sono 2-" (みゆきと真のニューヨーク出張-その2-); 397. "Ai shite hoshikatta no..." (愛して欲しかったの...); 398. "Hitori wa sabishī ndakara ☆" (ひとりは寂しいんだから☆); 399. "DV otoko ni yōchūi!!" (DV男に要注意!!); 400. "Jun-chan ninshin!!" (淳ちゃん妊娠!!); 401. "Kimi no seishun..." (キミの青春...); 402. "Yūra-san no bon odori ♬" (優良さんの盆踊り♪); 403. "Mō otonana ndakara ☆☆" (もう大人なんだから☆☆); 404. "Seikan-tai ga kawatchatta ♡" (性感帯が変わっちゃった♡)
43	July 29, 2009	978-4-592-14603-2	—	—
405. "Atarashī zengi ♡♡" (新しい前戯♡♡); 406. "Sensei!! Chekku shite kudasai!!!" (先生!!チェックしてください!!!); 407. "Kyonyū wa o kiraidesu ka!?" (巨乳はお嫌いですか!?); 408. "Chīsana mizugi ni komatchau ☆" (小さな水着に困っちゃう☆); 409. "Nyūhāfu no sekai ♬" (ニューハーフの世界♬); 410. "Sore tte funin sutoresu ☆☆" (それって不妊ストレス☆☆); 411. "Kodakara onsen e GO!!!" (子宝温泉へGO!!!); 412. "Kidoki no shūgakuryokō ♬ sono 1-" (キドキの修学旅行♬ーその1-); 413. "Dokidoki no shūgakuryokō ♬ ̄sono 2-" (ドキドキの修学旅行♬ーその2-); 414. "Ano hi no kokuhaku..." (あの日の告白...)
44	October 29, 2009	978-4-592-14604-9	—	—
415. "Kawan'nai ne ☆" (変わんないね☆); 416. "Kyōko-san shussan ♡♡♡" (杏子さん出産♡♡♡); 417. "Rabu hoteru ni tsukiatte ♡" (ラブホテルにつきあって♡); 418. "Mesukōsei nante daikirai!!" (女子高生なんて大嫌い!!); 419. "Nikushoku joshi to sōshoku danshi" (肉食女子と草食男子); 420. "Yūra tte yonde ♡♡" (優良って呼んで♡♡); 421. "Kekkon shita toki no kimochi ♬" (結婚したときの気持ち♬); 422. "Kore ga gāruzu bā ☆☆" (これがガールズバー☆☆); 423. "Renzoku etchi ga dekinaku natchatta!!" (連続エッチができなくなっちゃった!!); 424. "Mōsō seyo!! Makoto!!" (妄想せよ!!真!!)

=== 2010 ===
No.	Original release date	Original ISBN	English release date	English ISBN
45	January 29, 2010	978-4-592-14605-6	—	—
425. "Genki ni nareru sutorippu ♬" (元気になれるストリップ♬); 426. "300-kai wa ai no akashi ♡" (300回は愛のあかし♡); 427. "Kōkō saigo no natsuyasumi ☆" (高校最後の夏休み☆); 428. "Inaka Raifu wa subarashī!! -Sono 1-" (田舎ライフは素晴らしい!!-その1-); 429. "Inaka raifu wa subarashī!! -Sono 2-" (田舎ライフは素晴らしい!!-その2-); 430. "Jun-chan ★ puropōzu" (淳ちゃん★プロポーズ); 431. "Yuki VS Miyuki ☆☆☆" (ユキVSみゆき☆☆☆); 432. "Itoshino Bībā-chan ♡♡" (愛しのビーバーちゃん♡♡); 433. "Rui-chan no baito ★★★" (るいちゃんのバイト★★★); 434. "Tatsunda!! Makoto!!" (勃つんだ!!真!!)
46	April 28, 2010	978-4-592-14606-3	—	—
435. "Metabo ☆ panikku!!" (メタボ☆パニック!!); 436. "Nagare hoshi ni negai wo komete ♡" (流れ星に願いを込めて♡); 437. "Fuketsu desu!! Dārin ★" (フケツです!!ダーリン★); 438. "Rika-chan jūdai happyō!!!" (梨香ちゃん重大発表!!!); 439. "Itsu demo mae ni susumu dake ☆" (いつでも前に進むだけ☆); 440. "Fūfuna ndesu mono ♡♡" (夫婦なんですもの♡♡); 441. "Yūra-san!! Sensei!?" (優良さん!!先生!?); 442. "Rabu rabu ♡ kurisumasu kōryaku-hō" (ラブラブ♡クリスマス攻略法); 443. "Shimete ageru ♡♡♡" (締めてあげる♡♡♡); 444. "Min'na de joya no kane ♬" (みんなで除夜の鐘♬)
47	July 29, 2010	978-4-592-14607-0	—	—
445. "Gyaku choko ☆ barentain ♬" (逆チョコ☆バレンタイン♬); 446. "Atarashī kanrinin-san ♡" (新しい管理人さん♡); 447. "Kekkon wa naisho desu!!!" (結婚は内緒です!!!); 448. "Kanji ya suino ♡♡♡" (感じやすいの♡♡♡); 449. "Sayōnara!! Yayoi-chan..." (さようなら!!弥生ちゃん...); 450. "Makoto no mote-ki!?" (真のモテ期!?); 451. "Rika-chan no kanpeki sugiru kekkon seikatsu ☆" (梨香ちゃんの完璧すぎる結婚生活☆); 452. "Kaho-san no nayamigoto" (果穂さんの悩みごと); 453. "Ai-eki ga sukunai tte?" (愛液が少ないって?); 454. ""Shiofuki" shi chatta!?" ("潮吹き"しちゃった!?)
48	October 29, 2010	978-4-592-14608-7	—	—
455. "Makoto! Taoreru!!" (真!倒れる!!); 456. "Makoto-san no kawari..." (真さんの代わり...); 457. "Yūra-san to uōkingu ♬" (優良さんとウォーキング♬); 458. "Rui-chan no sotsugyōshiki ☆" (るいちゃんの卒業式☆); 459. "Kanji yasui no mo kosei ♡" (感じやすいのも個性♡); 460. "Rika-chan matamata jūdai happyō!!" (梨香ちゃん またまた重大発表!!); 461. "Bara de rirakkusu ♬♬" (薔薇でリラックス♬♬); 462. "Makoto no funin sōdan ☆☆☆" (真の不妊相談☆☆☆); 463. "Arisa-chan to kiken'na dēto!?" (亜理沙ちゃんと危険なデート!?); 464. "Yūra-san no nyūgan kenshin" (優良さんの乳ガン検診)

=== 2011 ===
No.	Original release date	Original ISBN	English release date	English ISBN
49	February 28, 2011	978-4-592-14609-4	—	—
465. "Suzuka-chan no kon katsu gōkon ♬" (鈴鹿ちゃんの婚活合コン♬); 466. "Kāmasūtora no o kuchi de ressun!!" (カーマ・スートラのお口でレッスン!!); 467. "Kāmasūtora jissen!!" (カーマ・スートラ実践!!); 468. "Sonzai-kan no nai otoko! Inagaki!!" (存在感のない男!稲垣!!); 469. "On'na migaki no Maki kachō ☆" (女磨きの牧課長☆); 470. "Yoriwo modoshitai..." (よりを戻したい...); 471. "Shin wa ikumen!?" (真はイクメン!?); 472. "Sugiyama-san no rasuto mōshon ★" (杉山さんのラストモーション★); 473. "Ko ga sukunai?" (子が少ない?)
50	July 29, 2011	978-4-592-14610-0	—	—
474. "Yūra-san sukauto sa reru ♡♡" (優良さんスカウトされる♡♡); 475. "Miyuki-chan no omiai!!" (みゆきちゃんのお見合い!!); 476. "Omiai wa taimingu ☆☆☆" (お見合いはタイミング☆☆☆); 477. "Sore tte... Futamata!?" (それって...フタマタ!?); 478. "Omoide no danbōru ♡" (思い出のダンボール♡); 479. "Inagaki no mote riyū ♬" (稲垣のモテ理由♬); 480. "Kindan no kyōdai!?" (禁断の姉弟!?); 481. "Yamada!! Kawatta!?" (山田!! 変わった!?); 482. "Kanrinin-san no koi..." (管理人さんの恋...); 483. "Akachan akiramemasu!!" (赤ちゃんあきらめます!!)
51	October 28, 2011	978-4-592-14611-7	—	—
484. "Yūra-san to kekkon shita riyū!?" (優良さんと結婚した理由!?); 485. "Dare ga ichiban utsukushī???" (誰が一番美しい???); 486. "Inagaki!! Sasen!!" (稲垣!! 左遷!!); 487. "Josei wa o hada ga ki ni narimasu ♡" (女性はお肌が気になります♡); 488. "Nēchan no fianse ★" (姉ちゃんの婚約者★); 489. "Suranpu ☆ Shōji-san!" (スランプ☆庄子さん!); 490. "Oppai pabu tte!?" (おっぱいパブって!?); 491. "Shitagi o kirō!!" (下着を切ろう!!); 492. "Yamada!! Kirawa re teru!?" (山田!! 嫌われてる!?); 493. "Rui-chan no yūutsu ☆" (るいちゃんの憂うつ☆); 494. "Akachan dōmei!!!" (赤ちゃん同盟!!!)

=== 2012 ===
No.	Original release date	Original ISBN	English release date	English ISBN
52	January 27, 2012	978-4-592-14612-4	—	—
495. "Kami o imechen shimasu ♡" (髪をイメチェンします♡); 496. "Yūra-san & Rika-chan no esute ryokō ☆" (優良さん&梨香ちゃんのエステ旅行☆); 497. "Makoto no hitori etchi naito!!" (真のひとりエッチナイト!!); 498. "Futago no haken shain ☆" (双子の派遣社員☆); 499. "Furadansu o oshiete ♡♡" (フラダンスを教えて♡♡); 500. "Omoide ga afureru..." (思い出があふれる...); 501. "Tsuyoshi-kun ♡ shotaiken ♬" (強くん♡ 初体験♬); 502. "Ninshin-ryoku o ageyō!!" (妊娠力を上げよう!!); 503. "Itsu demo nando demo ♡" (いつでも何度でも♡); 504. "Seiyoku no pīku tte!?" (性欲のピークって!?)
53	May 29, 2012	978-4-592-14613-1	—	—
505. "Yūra-san o sai kakunin ☆☆☆" (優良さんを再確認☆☆☆); 506. "Arai-tai esute ni dokkiri!!" (洗体エステにドッキリ!!); 507. "Denma purei tte dō suru no?" (電マプレイってどうするの?); 508. "Yomichi wa kiwotsukete ★" (夜道は気をつけて★); 509. "Min'na de batchiri meiku!" (みんなでバッチリメイク!); 510. "Miyuki-chan no `kotae'..." (みゆきちゃんの「答え」...); 511. "Moriyama-kun no chō sōrō sōdan ☆" (森山くんの超早漏相談☆); 512. "Akachan dōmei!! Go kainin!!" (赤ちゃん同盟!! ご懐妊!!); 513. "Kateikyōshi!! Miyuki-chan ♬" (家庭教師!! みゆきちゃん♬)
54	August 24, 2012	978-4-592-146-14-8	—	—
514. "Bura otoko demo ī janai!?" (ブラ男でもいいじゃない!?); 515. "Shinsha de GO!!" (新車でGO!!); 516. "Inagaki!! Futamata ni ketchaku!?" (稲垣!! フタマタに決着!?); 517. "Geijutsu no aki ☆ Yūra-san o egakō!!" (芸術の秋☆優良さんを描こう!!); 518. "O bentō ni shiyō ♬" (お弁当にしよう♬); 519. "Moshi ano jidai..." (もし あの時代...); 520. "Inagaki shitsuren!!!" (稲垣・失恋!!!); 521. "Koi wa takaramono ♡" (恋は宝物♡); 522. "Futari-kkiri no kashi bessō" (ふたりっきりの貸別荘); 523. "Akiramenaide no kotoba" (あきらめないでの言葉)
55	November 29, 2012	978-4-592-146-15-5	—	—
524. "Gurabia aidoru ga yattekita!!" (グラビアアイドルがやってきた!!); 525. "Romanchikku ga tarinai no ★" (ロマンチックが足りないの★); 526. "Min'na de torō!! Gurabia shashin!!" (みんなで撮ろう!! グラビア写真!!); 527. "Kekkonshitai ♡ Narimi-san" (結婚したい♡也実さん); 528. "Shijō saitei otoko!? Bakusō!!" (史上最低男!? 爆走!!); 529. "Katori buchō no okiniiri ♡" (香取部長のお気に入り♡); 530. "Makoto no shigoto osame ♬" (真の仕事納め♬); 531. "Yume no oiran Yūra-san ♡♡" (夢の花魁優良さん♡♡); 532. "20XX-toshi uchū no tabi ☆" (20XX年宇宙の旅☆); 533. "Anata to deatte kawarimashita..." (あなたと出会って変わりました...)

=== 2013 ===
No.	Original release date	Original ISBN	English release date	English ISBN
56	March 29, 2013	978-4-592-146-16-2	—	—
534. "Yūra-san oppai chekku ♡" (優良さんおっぱいチェック♡); 535. "Nōpan Yūra-san!?" (ノーパン優良さん!?); 536. "Hanazawa Ruina no kekkon-kan ☆☆☆" (花澤るいなの結婚観☆☆☆); 537. "Dakara... suki ni natta no yo!!" (だから...好きになったのよ!!); 538. "Katori buchō no kaishun massāji" (香取部長の回春マッサージ); 539. "Yūra-san no giri choko ♡♡" (優良さんの義理チョコ♡♡); 540. "Sotsugyō kinen ♬" (卒業記念♬); 541. "Paudārōshon de etchi ni shūchū ♡" (パウダーローションでエッチに集中♡); 542. "Uruwashi no Madonna ♡♡" (麗しのマドンナ♡♡); 543. "Tatsujin o mezase!!!" (達人を目指せ!!!)
57	June 28, 2013	978-4-592-146-17-9	—	—
544. "Yūra-san no saishū aibu tte!?" (優良さんの最終愛撫って!?); 545. "Otoko no Pantsu wa nani ga ī??" (男のパンツは何がいい??); 546. "Seidenki ga kowai!!!" (静電気が怖い!!!); 547. "Miyuki-chan no kareshi wa gaijin-san!?" (みゆきちゃんの彼氏は外人さん!?); 548. "Mimikaki wa iyashi ☆☆☆" (耳かきは癒し☆☆☆); 549. "Arigatō ♡♡♡" (ありがとう♡♡♡); 550. "Bībā-chan no uwaki chōsa!!" (ビーバーちゃんの浮気調査!!); 551. "Puranetariumu e ♬" (プラネタリウムへ♬); 552. "Mō modoranai..." (もう戻らない...); 553. "Himitsu no purezento ♬♬" (秘密のプレゼント♬♬)
58	September 27, 2013	978-4-592-146-18-6	—	—
554. "Baibu de moriagarō ♡♡♡" (バイブで盛り上がろう♡♡♡); 555. "Sore tte... tsuwari!?" (それって...つわり!?); 556. "Tokubetsuna Masaki-kun ☆☆☆" (特別な昌樹くん☆☆☆); 557. "Okaeshi wa sapuraizu ♬" (お返しはサプライズ♬); 558. "Shigoto ni ikiru on'na!!" (仕事に生きる女!!); 559. "Kore ga pinsaro da!!!" (これがピンサロだ!!!); 560. "Iroppoi shinjin OL Izumi-chan ♡" (色っぽい新人OL泉ちゃん♡); 561. "Izumi-chan no himitsu??" (泉ちゃんの秘密??); 562. "Ī ki ni naranaide kudasai ne!" (いい気にならないで下さいね!); 563. "Matto wa muzukashī ☆☆" (マットはむずかしい☆☆)

=== 2014 ===
No.	Original release date	Original ISBN	English release date	English ISBN
59	January 29, 2014	978-4-592-146-19-3	—	—
564. "Matto purei tatsujin-hen 1" (マットプレイ達人編①); 565. "Matto purei tatsujin-hen 2" (マットプレイ達人編②); 566. "Masaki-kun no sukina hito ♡♡" (昌樹くんの好きなひと♡♡); 567. "Taijū ga ki ni narimasu ★" (体重が気になります★); 568. "Sūpā konpanion ga yattekuru!!" (スーパーコンパニオンがやって来る!!); 569. "Jibun rashiku..." (自分らしく...); 570. "Mizuhara-san no sukyandaru ♡" (水原さんのスキャンダル♡); 571. "Hon'no hito kakera..." (ほんのひと欠片...); 572. "Izumi-chan no serebu seikatsu ♡♡" (泉ちゃんのセレブ生活♡♡); 573. "Josei-yō adaruto DVD tte!?" (女性用アダルトDVDって!?)
60	April 28, 2014	978-4-592-146-20-9	—	—
574. "Futari no zengi sutoretchi!!" (ふたりの前戯ストレッチ!!); 575. "Hon kon ryokō e shuppatsu ☆" (香港旅行へ出発☆); 576. "Gōjasu makao ♡♡" (ゴージャス・マカオ♡♡); 577. "Kore ga makao no kuwa da!!!" (これがマカオの桑拿だ!!!); 578. "Miyuki-chan no giwaku ★" (みゆきちゃんの疑惑★); 579. "Izumi-chan no deribarī herusu ♬♬" (泉ちゃんのデリバリーヘルス♬♬); 580. "Ekusutorīmu shussha de sōchō gōkon!?" (エクストリーム出社で早朝合コン!?); 581. "Yūra-san 30-sai ♡" (優良さん30歳♡); 582. "Wasurero yo..." (忘れろよ...); 583. "Kono koi akirame nakya..." (この恋あきらめなきゃ...)
61	July 29, 2014	978-4-592-147-26-8	—	—
584. "Futari kiri no taiwan ♡♡♡" (ふたりきりの台湾♡♡♡); 585. "Tobi dase!! 3D!!!" (とび出せ!! 3D!!!); 586. "Yūra-san choppiri itazura purei!?" (優良さんちょっぴり悪戯プレイ!?); 587. "Aijin sotsugyō!! Narimi-san ♡" (愛人卒業!! 也実さん♡); 588. "Haru ni nareba..." (春になれば...); 589. "Abunai Izumi-chan to Sakurako-chan no ian ryokō ♫ -sono 1-" (危ない泉ちゃんと桜子ちゃんの慰安旅行♫-その1-); 590. "Abunai Izumi-chan to Sakurako-chan no ian ryokō ♫ -sono 2-" (危ない泉ちゃんと桜子ちゃんの慰安旅行♪-その2-); 591. "Ai ga nakute mo...?" (愛がなくても...?); 592. "Te ga arimasu kara!!" (手がありますから!!); 593. "Dekoki no tatsujin tekunikku ♫♫" (手コキの達人テクニック♫♫)
62	October 29, 2014	978-4-592-147-27-5	—	—
594. "Atami e GO!!" (熱海へGO!!); 595. "Fushimi-kun no kanojo ♡♡" (伏見くんの彼女♡♡); 596. "Sayōnara ☆ rabu dōru ☆☆☆" (さようなら☆ ラブドール☆☆☆); 597. "Fāsuto kisu o yarinaosō ♡" (ファーストキスをやり直そう♡); 598. "Papa ni natta Watanabe-kun ♫" (パパになった渡辺くん♫); 599. "Sakurako-chan no tanoshīkoto!?" (桜子ちゃんの楽しいこと!?); 600. "Izumi-chan no dēto purei ♡" (泉ちゃんのデートプレイ♡); 601. "Tokubetsude ni sasete kudasai ♡♡♡" (特別でいさせてください♡♡♡); 602. "Yubiman no tatsujin ni narō!" (指マンの達人になろう!); 603. "Kore ga yubi teku no kōkada!!" (これが指テクの効果だ!!)

=== 2015 ===
No.	Original release date	Original ISBN	English release date	English ISBN
63	January 29, 2015	978-4-592-147-28-2	—	—
604. "Kuni no tatsujin tekunikku ♡" (クニの達人テクニック♡); 605. "Ikemen no nayami!?" (イケメンの悩み!?); 606. "Yūra-san no hitori etchi kanshō ♫" (優良さんのひとりエッチ鑑賞♫); 607. "Himo janai!!" (ヒモじゃない!!); 608. "AV joyū kyabakura desu ☆☆" (AV女優キャバクラです☆☆); 609. "Josei ni mo fundoshi būmu!?" (女性にもふんどしブーム!?); 610. "Kodaira-san no rosuto bājin ♡♡" (小平さんのロストバージン♡♡); 611. "Miyuki-chan no 1-nichi okusan ♡♡♡" (みゆきちゃんの1日奥さん♡♡♡); 612. "Otoko ni narenakucha ☆" (男に慣れなくちゃ☆); 613. "Yūra-san no kowaimono ☆☆☆" (優良さんの怖いもの☆☆☆)
64	June 29, 2015	978-4-592-147-29-9	—	—
614. "Nōsatsu!! Sekushī epuron ♡♡♡" (悩殺!! セクシーエプロン♡♡♡); 615. "Kore ga otegaru TENGA da!!" (これがお手軽TENGAだ!!); 616. "Yon-jū hatte kanzen kōryaku!!" (四十八手完全攻略!!); 617. "Kawaritai nara..." (変わりたいなら...); 618. "Suwappingu no sekai e yōkoso ★★★" (スワッピングの世界へようこそ★★★); 619. "Saishin josei-yō onī guzzu tte!?" (最新女性用オニーグッズって!?); 620. "Atarashī uketsuke jō no hen'na shumi??" (新しい受付嬢の変な趣味??); 621. "Fukuzatsuna futari ☆☆" (フクザツなふたり☆☆); 622. "Wasureteita omoi ★" (忘れていた想い★); 623. "Kōkai bakari o..." (後悔ばかりを...)
65	September 26, 2015	978-4-592-147-30-5	—	—
624. "Basu ryokō de wainarī e ikō!!" (バス旅行でワイナリーへ行こう!!); 625. "Josei ga tanoshimu kijō-i tte!?" (女性が楽しむ騎乗位って!?); 626. "Yūra-san ga hitodzuma fūzoku??" (優良さんが人妻風俗??); 627. "SEX no umai otoko to wa ★" (EXのうまい男とは★); 628. "Nazo no ura shi-jū hatte!!" (謎の裏四十八手!!); 629. "Ura yon-jū hachi te kanzen seiha!!!" (裏四十八手完全制覇!!!); 630. "Eiko-chan JK dēto!?" (英子ちゃんJKデート!?); 631. ""Rin" to shite itai" ("凛"としていたい); 632. "Naito pūru de enjoi ♫♫" (ナイトプールでエンジョイ♫♫); 633. "Emiri-chan ni kareshi o tsukurō!" (エミリちゃんに彼氏をつくろう!)

=== 2016 ===
No.	Original release date	Original ISBN	English release date	English ISBN
66	January 29, 2016	978-4-592-148-05-0	—	—
634. "Yatte miyō!! Zenra yoga ♫" (やってみよう!!全裸ヨガ♫); 635. "Boku wa zesshoku-kei!!" (ボクは絶食系!!); 636. "Makoto wa joshikai danshi!?" (真は女子会男子!?); 637. "Pōru dansu Yūra-san ♡♡" (ポールダンス優良さん♡♡); 638. "Imitēshon furawā" (イミテーションフラワー); 639. "Yūra-san no jidori nūdo ♡" (優良さんの自撮りヌード♡); 640. "Izumi-chan no muryō supesharu kōsu!?" (泉ちゃんの無料スペシャルコース!?); 641. "Zutto... matte ita no ni..." (ずっと...待っていたのに...); 642. "Kanojo wa Sofure boshū-chū!!!" (彼女はソフレ募集中!!!); 643. "Kyūkyoku no fechi-waza ashi koki!!" (究極のフェチ技・足コキ!!)
67	May 27, 2016	978-4-592-148-06-7	—	—
644. "Sei no shinpi ni furete mitai ♡" (性の神秘に触れてみたい♡); 645. "Masaki-kun no shotaiken no aite wa?" (昌樹くんの初体験の相手は?); 646. "Tameshitaku naru atarashī shijūhatte!" (試したくなる新しい四十八手!); 647. "Otoko ga semeru shinka-kei kijō-i!?" (男が攻める進化系騎乗位!?); 648. "Yūra-san no gendai shijūhatte kōza ☆" (優良さんの現代四十八手講座☆); 649. "Zesshoku-kei demo onaka wa sukunda!!" (絶食系でもお腹はすくんだ!!); 650. "Yubikiri no koibito" (指きりの恋人); 651. "Kiero Yūra-san ♡♡" (着エロ優良さん♡♡); 652. "Hagimoto fusai no SM gō konpātī" (萩本夫妻のSM合コンパーティー); 653. "Kokoro no sutoppā ★" (心のストッパー★)
68	September 29, 2016	978-4-592-148-07-4	—	—
654. "Chiguri kijōi to wa?" (チグリ騎上位とは?); 655. "Honmono no on'nanoko ♡" (本物の女の子♡); 656. "Ganbara nakute mo ī ndesu!!" (がんばらなくてもいいんです!!); 657. "Etchina omatsuri ni dokkiri!?" (エッチなお祭りにドッキリ!?); 658. "Itai no wa koko ☆" (痛いのはここ☆); 659. "Kosupure haroin pāti ♡♡" (コスプレ・ハロウィンパーティ♡♡); 660. "Kongai ren'ai shi teru ndesu!!!" (婚外恋愛してるんです!!!); 661. "Noma-kun no `mondai'" (野間くんの「問題」); 662. "Bājin janakatta!?" (バージンじゃなかった!?); 663. "Mune ga kyu~tto suru..." (胸がキュ～ッとする...)
69	December 26, 2016	978-4-592-148-08-1	—	—
664. "Kyūkyoku no SEX mashin!?" (究極のSEXマシン!?); 665. "Egao wa rabu no hajimari" (笑顔は愛(ラブ)の始まり); 666. "Robāto-san ga yattekita!!" (ロバートさんがやって来た!!); 667. "Yūra-san no bijiri de ♫" (優良さんの美尻で♫); 668. "Nichibei SEX bunka kōryū ☆" (日米SEX文化交流☆); 669. "Kekkon shitara on'na wa kawaru??" (結婚したら女は変わる??); 670. "Sakauchi-kun wa Wiru kare!?" (坂内くんはウィル彼!?); 671. "Mirai wa kawatte ita kamo shirenai" (未来は変わっていたかもしれない); 672. "Omoi o tojikome naide kure yo!!" (想いを閉じ込めないでくれよ!!); 673. "Omoide-meguri" (思い出巡り)

=== 2017 ===
No.	Original release date	Original ISBN	English release date	English ISBN
70	April 28, 2017	978-4-592-160-70-0	—	—
674. "Kōhaī ga nigate desu ☆" (後背位が苦手です☆); 675. "Tēburu etchi o kiwameyō!!" (テーブルエッチを極めよう!!); 676. "Sofure to shite no shinrai ☆" (ソフレとしての信頼☆); 677. "Anogoro to wa chigau" (あの頃とは違う); 678. "Koi no deai wa nanpa bā ♫" (恋の出会いはナンパバー♫); 679. "Sutekina ogyakusan ☆" (素敵なお客さん☆); 680. "Makoto-san kaizō keikaku!!" (真さん改造計画!!); 681. "Honki de kangae teru ♡" (本気で考えてる♡); 682. "Rabuho joshikai wa tanoshīne ♡" (ラブホ女子会は楽しいね♡); 683. "Futari no funin kensa" (ふたりの不妊検査)
71	July 28, 2017	978-4-592-160-71-7	—	—
684. "Tamani wa shōto SEX o ♫" (たまにはショートSEXを♫); 685. "Kokoro wa hitotsu dake" (心はひとつだけ); 686. "Baransu bōru de etchi shiyō!!" (バランスボールでエッチしよう!!); 687. "Isu purei ni charenji ♫" (椅子プレイにチャレンジ♫); 688. "Shea kareshi shimashō ka?" (シェア彼氏しましょうか?); 689. "Mae ni susumitai no ♡" (前に進みたいの♡); 690. "Hakoiri musume" (箱入り娘); 691. "Misu kara hajimaru monogatari" (ミスから始まる物語); 692. "O tanjōbi wa nangoku de ♡" (お誕生日は南国で♡); 693. "Suriru manten!? Beranda purei ♡" (スリル満点!?ベランダプレイ♡)
72	November 29, 2017	978-4-592-160-72-4; 978-4-592-105-88-6 (limited edition)	—	—
694. "Nakai iki tte nā ni!?" (中イキってなぁに!?); 695. "Nakai iki jissen-hō!!" (中イキ実践法!!); 696. "Fushimi-kun no rikai sa renai nichijō" (伏見くんの理解されない日常); 697. "Kore ga maruchi ōgazumu ☆" (これがマルチオーガズム☆); 698. "Ippo zenshin??" (一歩前進??); 699. "Ruiji-hin ni go chūi!?" (類似品にご注意!?); 700. "〝Matte iru〟" (〝待っている〟); 701. "Sabishī nante ☆" (寂しいなんて☆); 702. "Toriko no Sakurako-chan ♡♡♡" (トリコの桜子ちゃん♡♡♡); 703. "kimi ni dai shiki hōrudo ♫" (キミに大しゅきホールド♫)
73	November 29, 2017	978-4-592-160-73-1; 978-4-592-105-88-6 (limited edition)	—	—
704. "Yūra wa ninshin shimashita ♡" (優良は妊娠しました♡); 705. "Shussan ni mukete o benkyō ♫" (出産に向けてお勉強♫); 706. "Kyonyū ni meromero ☆" (巨乳にメロメロ☆); 707. "Ippai yasashiku ♡♡♡" (いっぱい優しく♡♡♡); 708. "Futari janakute..." (ふたりじゃなくて...); 709. "Koshitsu Bideo ni sen'nyū ♫" (個室ビデオに潜入♫); 710. "Kasanete iru..." (重ねている...); 711. "Fe gao de dai kōfun ♡" (フェ○顔で大興奮♡); 712. "Chanto mite ita no ka?" (ちゃんと見ていたのか?); 713. "Happī endo o akiramenai!!!" (ハッピーエンドをあきらめない!!!)

=== 2018 ===
No.	Original release date	Original ISBN	English release date	English ISBN
74	March 29, 2018	978-4-592-160-74-8	—	—
714. "Seinaru Yūra-san ♡♡♡" (聖なる優良さん♡♡♡); 715. "Dokidoki ☆ josei-yō fūzoku taiken!!" (ドキドキ☆女性用風俗体験!!); 716. "Mō futari janai no ne ☆" (もうふたりじゃないのね☆); 717. "Eiko-chan no otonana benkyō-kai ♡" (英子ちゃんの大人な勉強会♡); 718. "Itami ga oshieru imi" (痛みが教える意味); 719. "Ein massāji o shiyō!!" (会陰マッサージをしよう!!); 720. "Shutchō hosuto tte nani?" (出張ホストって何?); 721. "Arisa to Kana no rezubian purei ♫" (亜理沙とかなのレズビアンプレイ♫); 722. "An'na kaze ni..." (あんな風に...); 723. "Sofure shinka!!!" (ソフレ進化!!!)
75	March 29, 2018	978-4-592-160-75-5	—	—
724. "Purasu ka mainasu ka" (プラスかマイナスか); 725. "Mataniti seikatsu o tanoshimō!!" (マタニティ生活を楽しもう!!); 726. "Eiko-chan no otonana ressun sutāto ♡" (英子ちゃんの大人なレッスンスタート♡); 727. "Mōsugu umaremasu ♫" (もうすぐ産まれます♫); 728. "Yūra-san go shussan omedetō ♡♡♡" (優良さん ご出産おめでとう♡♡♡); 729. "3 no seikatsu sutāto ♫" (3人の生活スタート♫); 730. "Otona no ressun pāto 2" (大人のレッスンパート2); 731. "Otona no ressun pāto 3" (大人のレッスンパート3); 732. "Kizuna no akashi ♡" (絆の証♡); 733. "Genjitsu tōhi ni kasō genjitsu!?" (現実逃避に仮想現実!?)
76	July 27, 2018	978-4-592-160-76-2	—	—
734. "Sango no SEX tte!?" (産後のSEXって!?); 735. "Jibun no karada no henka o shirō!!" (自分のカラダの変化を知ろう!!); 736. "Minna no seikantai o sagasō ☆" (みんなの性感帯を探そう☆); 737. "Miyuki-chan no on'na migaki ♫" (みゆきちゃんの女磨き♫); 738. "Sore tte sakunyū purei?" (それって搾乳プレイ?); 739. "Sayonara no kisu wa o mise no rūru" (さよならのキスはお店のルール); 740. "Misaki-chan no kyonyū purei kōza" (美咲ちゃんの巨乳プレイ講座); 741. "Daitan sofure ni naru nda!!" (大胆ソフレになるんだ!!); 742. "AV kantoku arawaru!!!" (AV監督現る!!!)
77	December 26, 2018	978-4-592-160-77-9	—	—
743. "Natsukashī AV joyū ♡♡" (懐かしいAV女優♡♡); 744. "Sango hajimete no rabu hoteru ♡" (産後初めてのラブホテル♡); 745. "Rentaruna koi" (レンタルな恋); 746. "Shiawaseni shitai ♫" (幸せにしたい♫); 747. "Mō hitotsu no kao" (もうひとつの顔); 748. "Masurao sensei no genkō o totte koi!!" (ますらお先生の原稿を取ってこい!!); 749. "Maya-chan ni meromero ♡" (まあやちゃんにメロメロ♡); 750. "Sofure kinenbi ♡♡♡" (ソフレ記念日♡♡♡); 751. "Sekushī ni natte miro!!" (セクシーになってみろ!!)

=== 2019 ===
No.	Original release date	Original ISBN	English release date	English ISBN
78	April 26, 2019	978-4-592-160-78-6	—	—
752. "Jun-chan no sazukari kon ♡" (淳ちゃんの授かり婚♡); 753. "Makkurana yozora no shita de" (真っ暗な夜空の下で); 754. "Kon'na kankei okashī!!" (こんな関係おかしい!!); 755. "Furendo kara koibito e ♡♡♡" (フレンドから恋人へ♡♡♡); 756. "Kon'ya no soine wa chigau ♫" (今夜の添い寝は違う♫); 757. "Kore ga AV satsuei genbada!!!" (これがAV撮影現場だ!!!); 758. "Boku-tachi no himitsu da ne" (ぼくたちの秘密だね); 759. "Endo rōru no ato ni..." (エンドロールのあとに...); 760. "Yamagishi-kun to mahō no heya" (山岸くんと魔法の部屋)
79	September 27, 2019	978-4-592-160-79-3	—	—
761. "Kikon-sha gōkon ni bikkuri!!" (既婚者合コンにびっくり!!); 762. "Kotaeha jibun no naka ni ★" (答えは自分の中に★); 763. "Māya chanto futari kiri ☆" (まあやちゃんとふたりきり☆); 764. "Kisu kara hajimaru benkyō-kai ♡" (キスから始まる勉強会♡); 765. "Omae mo namete hoshī nda na?" (おまえも舐めて欲しいんだな?); 766. "Kon'na no nozonde inai!!" (こんなの望んでいない!!); 767. "Yūra-san no seiyoku suitchi o irero!!!" (優良さんの性欲スイッチを入れろ!!!); 768. "Mitasa renai! Yamagishi-kun!!" (満たされない! 山岸くん!!); 769. "Shiranakatta..." (知らなかった...)

=== 2020 ===
No.	Original release date	Original ISBN	English release date	English ISBN
80	February 28, 2020	978-4-592-16080-9	—	—
770. "Hisho Miyuki-chan ♡" (秘書みゆきちゃん♡); 771. "Yamagishi-kun no dekoki fūzoku" (山岸君の手コキ風俗); 772. "48 yoga tte nā ni!?" (48手ヨガってなぁに!?); 773. "Nen'ne shiyō ne ♡ Maya-chan" (ねんねしようね♡まあやちゃん); 774. "Oshiete hoshī!! Chikubi zuri ♡" (教えてほしい!! 乳首ズリ♡); 775. "Saigo made shite!!" (最後までして!!); 776. "Shin no AV kaikin!!" (真のAV解禁!!); 777. "Hon buchō wa dōtei shinshi!!!" (本部長は童貞紳士!!!); 778. "Ribenji!! Chūnen dōtei!!" (リベンジ!! 中年童貞!!)
81	June 26, 2020	978-4-592-16081-6	—	—
779. "Sango kuraishisu wa iya!!" (産後クライシスはイヤ!!); 780. "Yamagishi-kun no ime kura purei ♡" (山岸くんのイメクラプレイ♡); 781. "Ginga-kun ni o kuchi de go hōshi!?" (銀河くんにお口でご奉仕!?); 782. "Koikatsu o hajimeyō ♫" (恋活を始めよう♫); 783. "Kanojo wa shokubutsu-kei joshi ☆" (彼女は植物系女子☆); 784. "Mō kakusanai!!!" (もう隠さない!!!); 785. "Mama katsu tte nā ni!?" (ママ活ってなぁに!?); 786. "Ima aru shiawase..." (今ある幸せ...); 787. "Hon buchō wa SEX shoshinsha!" (本部長はSEX初心者!)
82	November 27, 2020	978-4-592-16082-3	—	—
788. "2 ga hoshī!?" (2人めが欲しい!?); 789. "Sofure kara koibito ni natta kedo!?" (ソフレから恋人になったけど!?); 790. "Ginga-kun no fechio kōza" (銀河君のフェチオ講座); 791. "Otona no ressun saishū shūshō!!" (大人のレッスン最終章!!); 792. "Eiko-chan no rosuto bājin ♡" (英子ちゃんのロストバージン♡); 793. "Watashi o totte!! Yamagishi-kun ☆" (わたしを撮って!! 山岸くん☆); 794. "Kokoro made dōtei!?" (心まで童貞!?); 795. "2-me ninshin kyōka shūkan!!" (2人め妊娠強化週間!!); 796. "Kon'ya wa anata to onrain ♡" (今夜はあなたとオンライン♡)

=== 2021 ===
No.	Original release date	Original ISBN	English release date	English ISBN
83	April 28, 2021	978-4-592-16083-0	—	—
797. "Kore ga majikku mirā-gōda!!!" (これがマジックミラー号だ!!!); 798. "Genjitsu o miro!! Sadamitsu!!" (現実を見ろ!! 貞光!!); 799. "Happī bāsudē ☆ Miyuki-chan ♡" (ハッピーバースデー☆みゆきちゃん ♡); 800. "Deguchi no saki ni..." (出口の先に...); 801. "Renzoku shasei shite moraimasu ☆" (連続射精してもらいます☆); 802. "Seikyōiku wa itsu kara?" (性教育はいつから?); 803. H"apuningu Bā taiken-ki 1" (ハプニングバー体験記①); 804. "Hapuningu Bā taiken-ki 2" (ハプニングバー体験記②); 805. "SEX tte tanoshī ♡♡♡" (SEXって楽しい♡♡♡)
84	August 27, 2021	978-4-592-16084-7	—	—
806. "Kotae wa tsugini shiyō!!" (答えは次にしよう‼︎); 807. "3P wa muzukashī ★★★" (3Pは難しい★★★); 808. "Ohitorisama o tanoshinde imasu ♡" (おひとり様を楽しんでいます♡); 809. "Yamagishi-kun wa fūzoku izon!?" (山岸くんは風俗依存⁉︎); 810. "Maya-chan no sotsu chichi ☆" (まあやちゃんの卒乳☆); 811. "Mada mirai ga aru" (まだ未来がある); 812. "Kekkon shimasen ka? Sakurako-san ♡" (結婚しませんか?桜子さん♡); 813. "Shishunki danshi wa mōsō no hibi ♡" (思春期男子は妄想の日々♡); 814. "Min'na chigau nda na..." (みんな違うんだな...)

=== 2022 ===
No.	Original release date	Original ISBN	English release date	English ISBN
85	January 28, 2022	978-4-592-16085-4	—	—
815. "Mama to yobanaide!!" (ママと呼ばないで!!); 816. "Min'na ni seika o mite moraitai ♡" (みんなに成果を見てもらいたい♡); 817. "Chie no supaidā kijōi!!" (千恵のスパイダー騎乗位!!); 818. "Fūzoku jō to okyaku no mizo" (風俗嬢とお客の溝); 819. "Nurunuru jigoku o yaritai!!" (Vぬるぬる地獄をヤりたい!!); 820. "Nagaiki dekimasen yo!!" (長生きできませんよ!!); 821. "Misaki-chan no ￮￮￮ sōdan!?" (美咲ちゃんの○○○相談⁉); 822. "Otoko no shiofuki... shite moraimasu ☆" (男の潮吹き・・・してもらいます☆); 823. "Rezubian fūzoku ni yōkoso ♬" (レズビアン風俗にようこそ♬)
86	May 27, 2022	978-4-592-16086-1	—	—
824. Yūra-san ★ sango SEX ni fuman? (優良さん★産後SEXに不満?); 825. Nan demo nozomi o itte kure!! (なんでも望みをいってくれ!!); 826. Shiawase ni narenai to shitara... (幸せになれないとしたら...); 827. Hitodzuma ni hanataba o (人妻に花束を); 828. Gokubuto kyaku ni wa kanawanai!!! (極太客にはかなわない!!!); 829. Kimi no Patoron ni narou ☆ (キミのパトロンになろう☆); 830. Chie-chan no kokuhaku (千恵ちゃんの告白); 831. Miyuki-chan no rezu-sei-kan esute (みゆきちゃんのレズ性感エステ); 832. Ai ga nakute mo kanjiru no yo (愛がなくても感じるのよ)
87	September 29, 2022	978-4-592-16087-8	—	—
833. Nūdisuto Bīchi ni ikou ♬ (ヌーディストビーチに行こう♬); 834. Mō oshieru koto wanai!! (もう教えることはない!!); 835. Ai-kan-tai o semeyou ♡ (愛感帯を攻めよう♡); 836. Fuan'na no... (不安なの...); 837. Kon'ya wa oppai Pātī ♡♡♡ (今夜はおっぱいパーティー♡♡♡); 838. Kono mama ja ikenai!!! (このままじゃいけない!!!); 839. Wakakereba yokatta!? (若ければよかった!?); 840. Atashi no seiyoku o kaishō shite kudasai! (あたしの性欲を解消してください!); 841. Hitodzuma Paradaisu ♪♪♪ (人妻パラダイス♪♪♪)

=== 2023 ===
No.	Original release date	Original ISBN	English release date	English ISBN
88	January 27, 2023	978-4-592-16088-5	—	—
842. Iku tame no Ai Messēji ★ (イクためのアイメッセージ★); 843. SEX suru ki ga okimasen ☆ (SEXする気がおきません☆); 844. Kore ga genjitsu... (これが現実...); 845. Mesuiki taiken shite miyou! (メスイキ体験してみよう！); 846. Ribenji 3P!!! (リベンジ3P！！！); 847. Futari no atarashī chōsen!! (ふたりの新しい挑戦！！); 848. Don'na mōsō suru nda yo!? (どんな妄想するんだよ！？); 849. Fukanshōna ndesu ☆☆☆ (不感症なんです☆☆☆); 850. Anata no kawari ni... (あなたの代わりに...)
89	May 29, 2023	978-4-592-16089-2	—	—
851. Jikken!! Tekuno Bureiku!!! (実験!! テクノブレイク!!!); 852. Itsumo bakku de gomen'nasai ☆ (いつもバックでごめんなさい☆); 853. Shiawaseni dekinai zo!! (幸せにできないぞ!!); 854. `Tsuma dake ED' tte!? (「妻だけED」って!?); 855. Koibito no furi o shimasho ☆ (恋人のふりをしましょ☆); 856. Kekkon shiyou!! Rika ♡ (結婚しよう!!梨香♡); 857. Dokidoki shinakatta!? (ドキドキしなかった!?); 858. Sashite hoshī... (挿れて欲しい...); 859. Go hōshi itashimasu ♡♡♡ (ご奉仕いたします♡♡♡)

=== 2024 ===
No.	Original release date	Original ISBN	English release date	English ISBN
90	February 29, 2024	978-4-592-16090-8	—	—
860. 2-ri me mondai wa taihen!? (2人め問題は大変!?); 861. Fasuto SEX ga chōdo ī? (ファストSEXがちょうどいい?); 862. Herusupain 2 no shinjin-san!! (ヘルスパイン2の新人さん!!); 863. Kimi no mune no naka de... (君の胸の中で...); 864. Rezubian SEX ♡♡♡ (レズビアンSEX♡♡♡); 865. Himawari hatake de... (ひまわり畑で...); 866. Ichi Hana-chan-tachi no Rasuto Samā Taimu ♬ (一華ちゃんたちのラストサマータイム♬); 867. Chie o ika sete ♡ (千恵をイカせて♡); 868. Rabu Supankingu tte!? (ラブスパンキングって!?)
91	June 28, 2024	978-4-592-16091-5	—	—
869. Chie-chan to ryōjoku Purei ♡ (千恵ちゃんと凌辱ぷれい♡); 870. Engi o sureba ī nda wa (演技をすればいいんだわ); 871. Kono ko wa kyōiku shinakereba!!! (このコは教育しなければ!!!); 872. Min'na wa boku no Aidoru na nda ♡ (みんなはぼくのアイドルなんだ♡); 873. Tamani wa Dēto Naito ♡ (たまにはデートナイト♡); 874. Shindō buchō ☆ goryōshin ni go aisatsu ♬ (神童部長☆ご両親にご挨拶♬); 875. not for sale; 876. Miyuki-chan no Penisu Bando ☆ (みゆきちゃんのペニスバンド☆); 877. Netori netorare wakan? (ネトリ・ネトラレ・和姦?)
92	November 28, 2024	978-4-592-16092-2	—	—
878. Tsugi wa Eiko no ban ♡♡♡ (次は英子の番♡♡♡); 879. Fukanshō demo īdesu ka? (不感症でもいいですか?); 880. Kekkon madjika no Kappuru-tachi ♡ (結婚間近のカップルたち♡); 881. Chitsu tore yatte miyou!! (膣トレやってみよう!!); 882. Hokori o motteru no ☆ (誇りを持ってるの☆); 883. Ai dake de... (愛だけで...); 884. Kare o shiawaseni shitai ♡ (彼を幸せにしたい♡); 885. Kana-chan no nayami (かなちゃんの悩み); 886. Kazuhiko-kun no o tomari-kai ♬ (和彦くんのお泊り会♬)

=== 2025 ===
No.	Original release date	Original ISBN	English release date	English ISBN
93	August 29, 2025	978-4-592-16093-9	—	—
887. Mōsō o nameru na!! (妄想をなめるな!!); 888. Kyō wa o uchi ga Rabu Hoteru ♡ (今日はおうちがラブホテル♡); 889. Ore wa SEX Mashin ☆ (おれはSEXマシン☆); 890. Fukki ♬ Herusupain no Izumi-chan ♡ (復帰♬ヘルスパインの泉ちゃん♡); 891. Hitodzuma ♡ Misaki-chan ♡♡♡ (人妻♡美咲ちゃん♡♡♡); 892. Nagisa-san no zenshin Rippu ♡ (ナギサさんの全身リップ♡); 893. Kekkonshiki desu ♡ shindō buchō!! (結婚式です♡神童部長!!); 894. Rumi-chan no onegai (ルミちゃんのお願い); 895. Banira SEX ttenani? (バニラSEXって何？)

=== 2026 ===
No.	Original release date	Original ISBN	English release date	English ISBN
94	January 29, 2026	978-4-592-16094-6	—	—
896. Seiyoku Monsutā ni natchatta!? (性欲モンスターになっちゃった!?); 897. Miyuki-chan to Daburu Beddo ♬ (みゆきちゃんとダブルベッド♬); 898. Anata de watashi ga kawaru (あなたでわたしが変わる); 899. Eiko-chan 20-sai no tanjōbi ♡ (英子ちゃん20歳の誕生日♡); 900. Hitodzuma no mōsō wa kinshidesu!! (人妻の妄想は禁止です!!); 901. Yamagishi!! Jitsugi no kōshū-in ni naru (山岸!! 実技の講習員になる); 902. Nanami-chan ☆ kanji teru⁉ (七海ちゃん☆感じてる⁉); 903. Sutōkā kyaku ni goyōshin (ストーカー客にご用心); 904. Chijo ni natte mimashou ka? (痴女になってみましょうか?)
95	June 28, 2026	978-4-592-16095-3	—	—
905. Ginga-kun no o tanjōbi wa nani o suru? (銀河くんのお誕生日はナニをする？); 906. Hāremu 4P ni hatsu chōsen ♡ (ハーレム4Pに初挑戦♡); 907. Miyuki-chan wa zurukunai... (みゆきちゃんはズルくない...); 908. Omedetō ♡ toshi no sa kekkonshiki ♬ (おめでとう♡歳の差結婚式♬); 909. NG Purei o oshiete kudasai!!; 910. Dokidoki ♡ Ichika-chan to Shawā ♡ (ドキドキ♡一華ちゃんとシャワー♡); 911. Kyatchi kopī o kangaeyou ☆ (キャッチコピーを考えよう☆); 912. Motto miryoku o mitsuke nasai!! (もっと魅力を見つけなさい!!); 913. Don'na etchi o mita ndesu ka? (どんなエッチを見たんですか？)
96	November 27, 2026	978-4-592-16148-6	—	—

== Futari Ecchi For Ladies ==
No.	Japanese release date	Japanese ISBN
1	December 19, 2003	978-4-592-13331-5
Diary 1: "Min'na don'na etchi o shi teru no?" (みんなどんなエッチをしてるの?); Diary 2: "Etchi shitai ♡ tte ienai!!" (エッチしたい♡っていえない!!); Diary 3: "Kimochi no ī taii tte!?" (気持ちのいい体位って!?); Diary 4: "Hosuto kurabu no sekai ♡" (ホストクラブの世界♡); Diary 5: "Yūra-san no furin ganbō!?" (優良さんの不倫願望!?); Diary 6: "Etchi no o benkyō ♡♡" (エッチのお勉強♡♡)
2	February 2, 2005	978-4-592-13332-2
Diary 7: "Moshimo..." (もしも...); Diary 8: "Uwaki de rikon!?" (浮気で離婚!?); Diary 9: "Shoshin wazuru bekarazu ☆" (初心忘るるべからず☆); Diary 10: "Makoto-san! Kanjimashita!?" (真さん!感じました!?); Diary 11: "Kyō no dēto wa...!?" (今日のデートは...!?); Diary 12: "Yūra-san no tanjōbi" (優良さんの誕生日)

== Futari Ecchi Gaiden: Akira, The Evangelist of Sex ==
No.	Japanese release date	Japanese ISBN
1	December 26, 2017	978-4-592-14345-1
