= List of Billboard number-one country songs of 2021 =

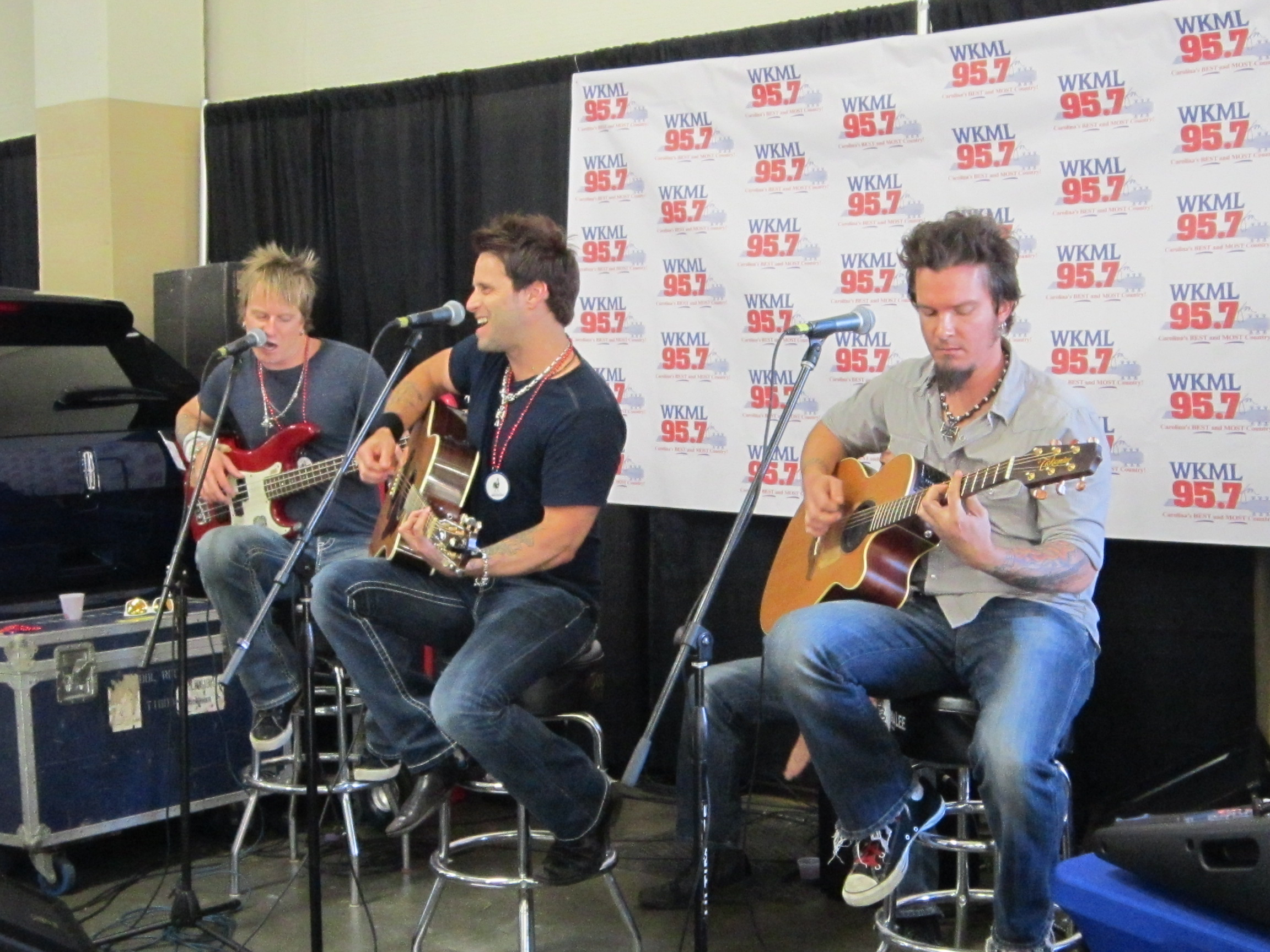
Parmalee scored their first number one single in more than seven years in March with "Just the Way".

Hot Country Songs and Country Airplay are charts that rank the top-performing country music songs in the United States, published by Billboard magazine. Hot Country Songs ranks songs based on digital downloads, streaming, and airplay not only from country stations but from stations of all formats, a methodology introduced in 2012. Country Airplay, which began publication in 2012, is based solely on country radio airplay, a methodology that had previously been used from 1990 to 2012 for Hot Country Songs. In 2021, 13 different songs topped the Hot Country Songs chart and 33 different songs topped Country Airplay in 52 issues of the magazine.

The year began with "Big, Big Plans" by Chris Lane returning to number one on the Country Airplay chart, having previously topped the listing in the issue of Billboard dated December 19, 2020, while "I Hope" by Gabby Barrett held the top spot on Hot Country Songs, the song's 22nd week atop the chart. Barrett thus continued to extend her record for the longest-running number one song on that chart by a solo female artist, having broken the record two weeks earlier. The song was displaced from the top spot in the issue dated January 23 by Morgan Wallen's "Wasted on You", but returned to the peak position the following week. In February, Taylor Swift debuted atop Hot Country Songs with a re-recorded version of her 2008 number one single, "Love Story". It was her first chart-topper on that listing since 2012's "We Are Never Ever Getting Back Together" and her first to enter at the top of the chart. Furthermore, it made Swift the second artist to top the chart twice with different recordings of the same song after Dolly Parton with "I Will Always Love You".

In March, Niko Moon gained his first number one as a performer when "Good Time" topped both charts; he had previously written a number of chart-toppers for the Zac Brown Band. It was the first debut single to simultaneously top both listings since 2014. Walker Hayes achieved his first chart-topper in July when "Fancy Like" topped Hot Country Songs; the song had become a viral success based on a video on social media site TikTok, and by the end of the year had spent 20 weeks atop the listing. In September, Lainey Wilson gained her first number one when "Things a Man Oughta Know" reached the peak position on Country Airplay, and the following month "My Boy" topped the same chart to give Elvie Shane, a contestant on the fifteenth season of American Idol his first chart-topper. Canadian singer MacKenzie Porter gained her first number one in December as a featured artist on Dustin Lynch's "Thinking 'Bout You", which ended the year atop the chart. The longest-lasting Country Airplay number one was Luke Combs's "Forever After All", which spent six weeks at the top. The song was his 11th consecutive number one on that chart from the start of his career, extending his own record. Combs spent a total of thirteen weeks at number one and had four chart-topping singles, both more than any other act during 2021. Luke Bryan, Thomas Rhett, Florida Georgia Line, and Jason Aldean were the only other acts to achieve more than one chart-topper during the year, with two each.

== Chart history ==
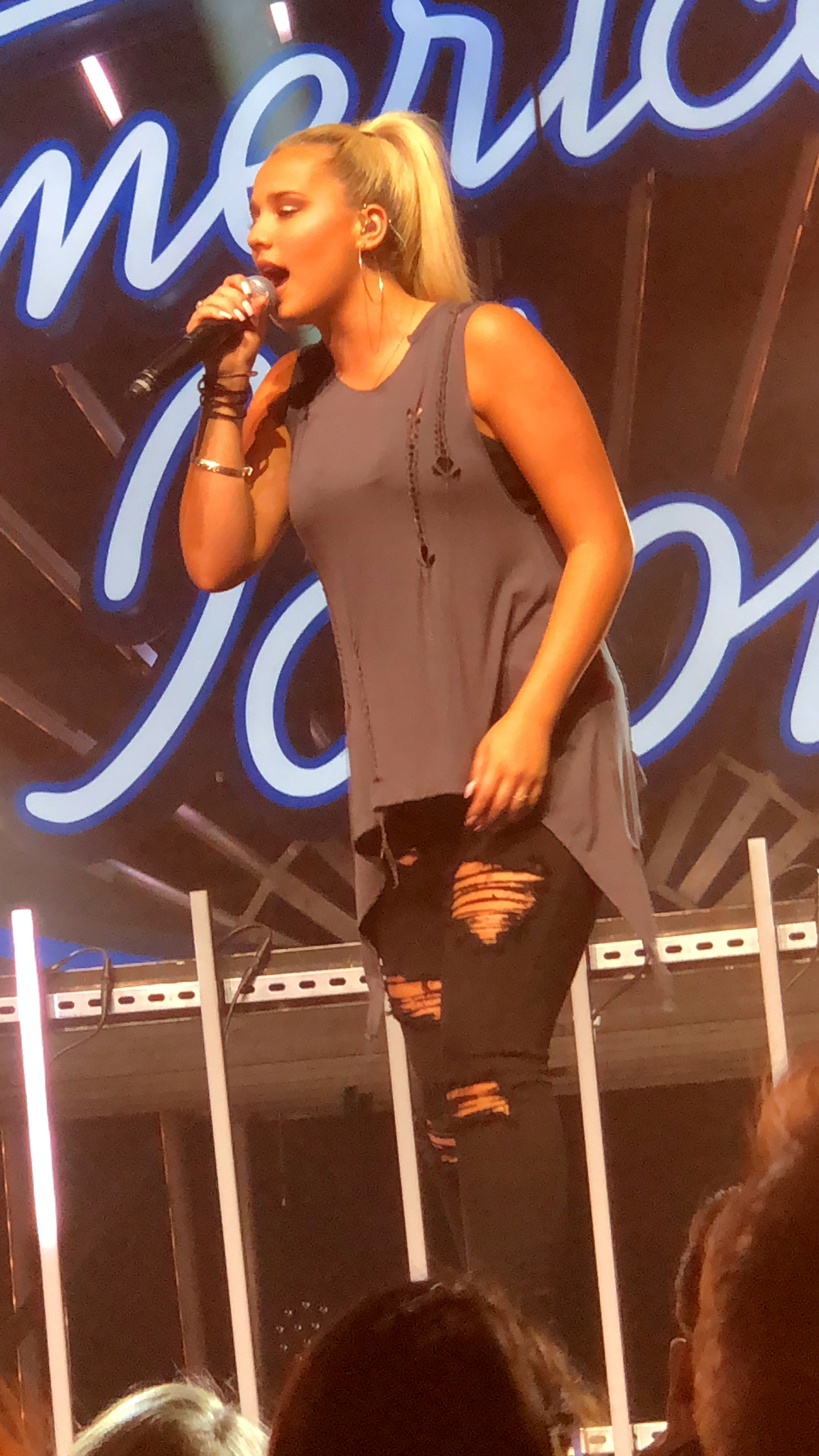
The year began with Gabby Barrett continuing a record-breaking run at number one on the Hot Country Songs chart with "I Hope". She achieved a second number one in April with "The Good Ones".

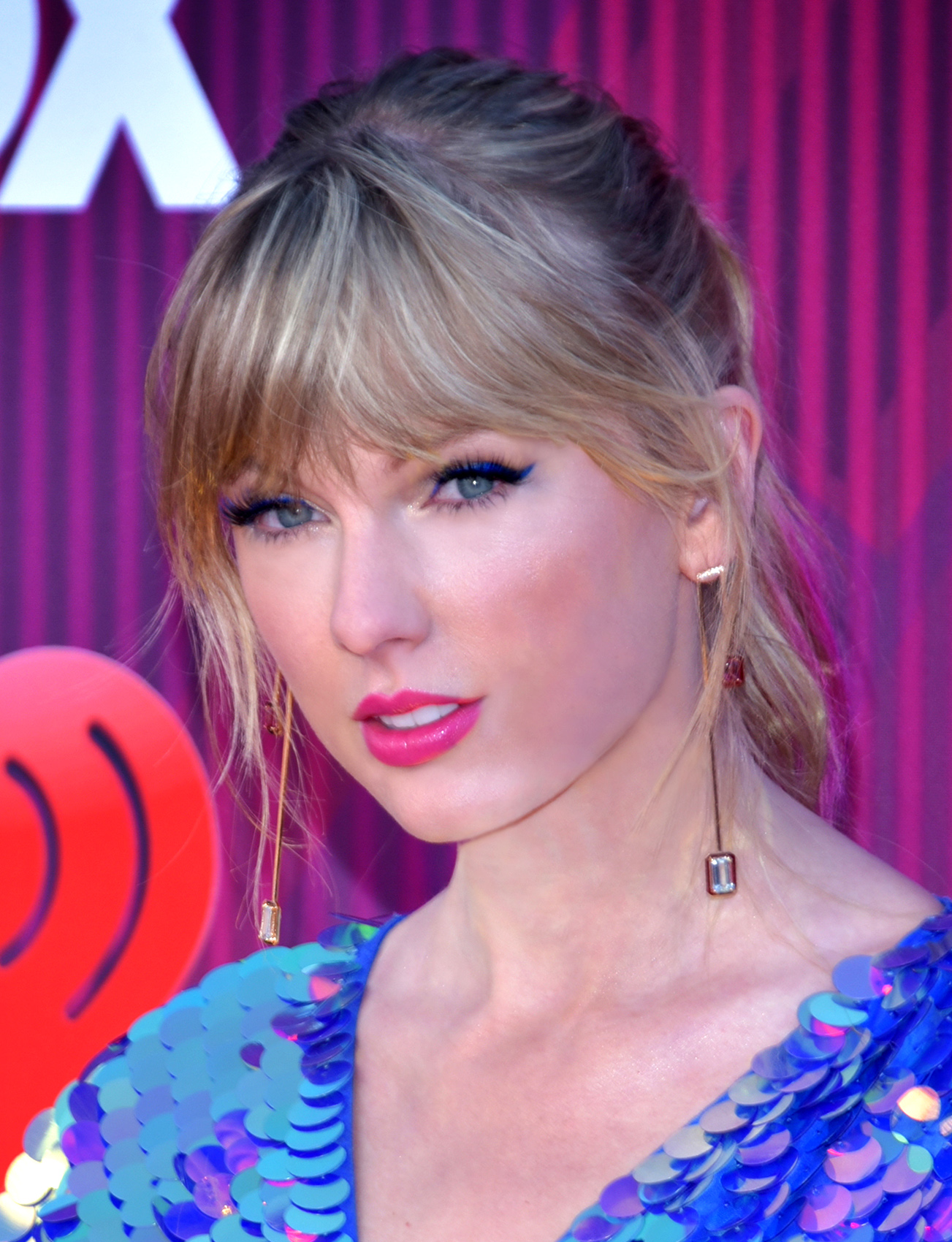
Taylor Swift gained her first country number one for more than eight years with a new recording of her 2008 single, "Love Story". This also made her the second artist in history to top the chart twice with two different versions of the same song.

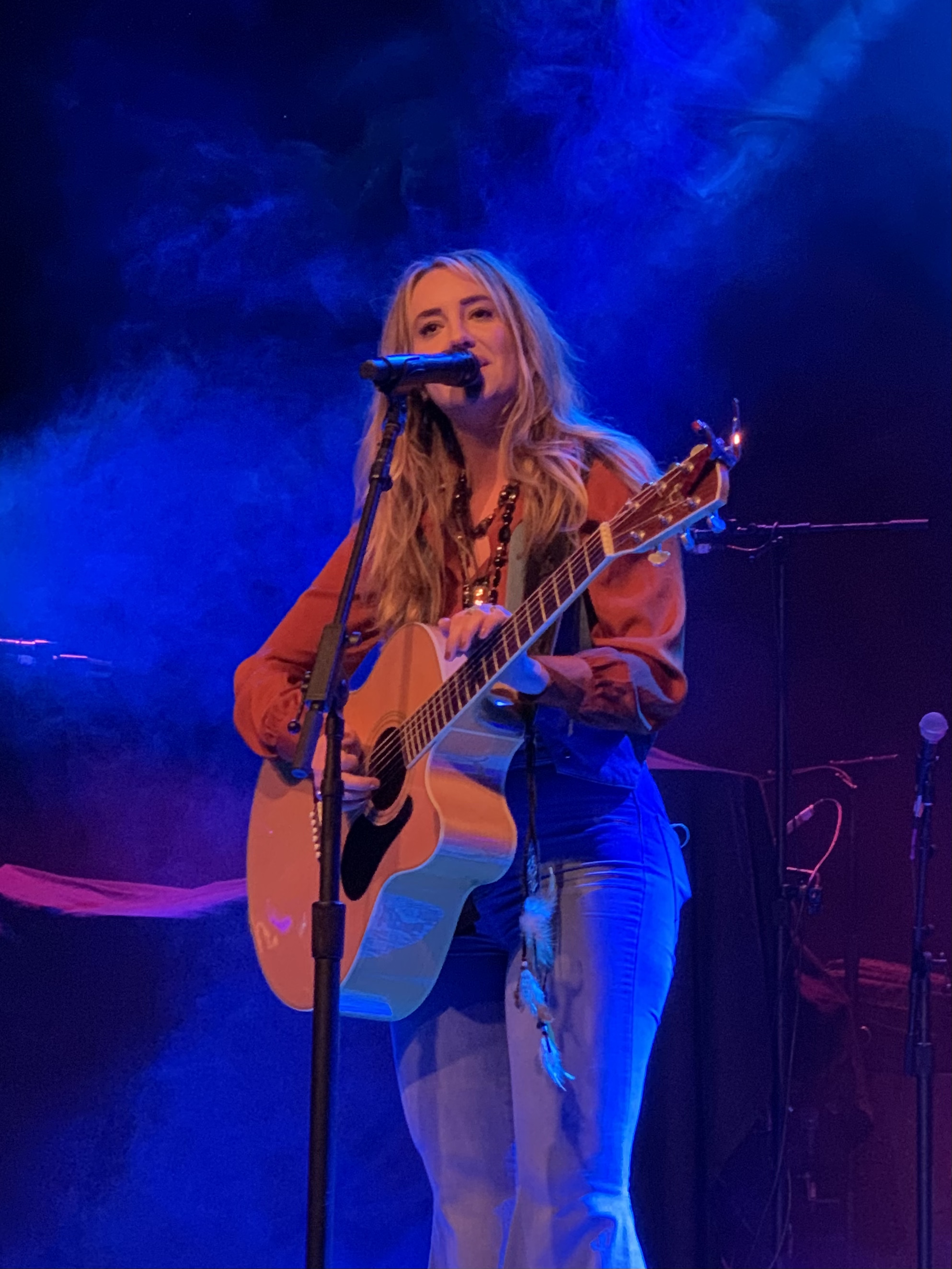
Lainey Wilson gained her first number one in September with "Things a Man Oughta Know".

Chart history
Issue date	Hot Country Songs			Country Airplay		
Issue date	Title	Artist(s)	Ref.	Title	Artist(s)	Ref.
January 2	"I Hope"	Gabby Barrett		"Big, Big Plans"	Chris Lane	
January 9	"I Hope"	Gabby Barrett		"Champagne Night"	Lady A	
January 16	"I Hope"	Gabby Barrett		"Champagne Night"	Lady A	
January 23	"Wasted on You"	Morgan Wallen		"Better Together"	Luke Combs	
January 30	"I Hope"	Gabby Barrett		"Better Together"	Luke Combs	
February 6	"Better Together"	Luke Combs		"Better Together"	Luke Combs	
February 13	"Better Together"	Luke Combs		"Better Together"	Luke Combs	
February 20	"Better Together"	Luke Combs		"Better Together"	Luke Combs	
February 27	"Love Story (Taylor's Version)"	Taylor Swift		"Beers and Sunshine"	Darius Rucker	
March 6	"I Hope"	Gabby Barrett		"Down to One"	Luke Bryan	
March 13	"Good Time"	Niko Moon		"Good Time"	Niko Moon	
March 20	"I Hope"	Gabby Barrett		"Just the Way"	Parmalee and Blanco Brown	
March 27	"What's Your Country Song"	Thomas Rhett		"What's Your Country Song"	Thomas Rhett	
April 3	"What's Your Country Song"	Thomas Rhett		"Lady"	Brett Young	
April 10	"The Good Ones"	Gabby Barrett		"Long Live"	Florida Georgia Line	
April 17	"Starting Over"	Chris Stapleton		"The Good Ones"	Gabby Barrett	
April 24	"The Good Ones"	Gabby Barrett		"The Good Ones"	Gabby Barrett	
May 1	"The Good Ones"	Gabby Barrett		"The Good Ones"	Gabby Barrett	
May 8	"The Good Ones"	Gabby Barrett		"Made for You"	Jake Owen	
May 15	"Forever After All"	Luke Combs		"Made for You"	Jake Owen	
May 22	"Forever After All"	Luke Combs		"Breaking Up Was Easy in the 90s"	Sam Hunt	
May 29	"Forever After All"	Luke Combs		"Hell of a View"	Eric Church	
June 5	"Forever After All"	Luke Combs		"Forever After All"	Luke Combs	
June 12	"Forever After All"	Luke Combs		"Forever After All"	Luke Combs	
June 19	"Forever After All"	Luke Combs		"Forever After All"	Luke Combs	
June 26	"Forever After All"	Luke Combs		"Forever After All"	Luke Combs	
July 3	"Forever After All"	Luke Combs		"Forever After All"	Luke Combs	
July 10	"Forever After All"	Luke Combs		"Forever After All"	Luke Combs	
July 17	"Am I the Only One"	Aaron Lewis		"Famous Friends"	Chris Young and Kane Brown	
July 24	"Fancy Like"	Walker Hayes		"Blame It on You"	Jason Aldean	
July 31	"Fancy Like"	Walker Hayes		"Single Saturday Night"	Cole Swindell	
August 7	"Fancy Like"	Walker Hayes		"Single Saturday Night"	Cole Swindell	
August 14	"Fancy Like"	Walker Hayes		"Drinkin' Beer. Talkin' God. Amen."	Chase Rice featuring Florida Georgia Line	
August 21	"Fancy Like"	Walker Hayes		"Glad You Exist"	Dan + Shay	
August 28	"Fancy Like"	Walker Hayes		"We Didn't Have Much"	Justin Moore	
September 4	"Fancy Like"	Walker Hayes		"Waves"	Luke Bryan	
September 11	"Fancy Like"	Walker Hayes		"Waves"	Luke Bryan	
September 18	"Fancy Like"	Walker Hayes		"Country Again"	Thomas Rhett	
September 25	"Fancy Like"	Walker Hayes		"Things a Man Oughta Know"	Lainey Wilson	
October 2	"Fancy Like"	Walker Hayes		"You Time"	Scotty McCreery	
October 9	"Fancy Like"	Walker Hayes		"Cold Beer Calling My Name"	Jameson Rodgers featuring Luke Combs	
October 16	"Fancy Like"	Walker Hayes		"Memory I Don't Mess With"	Lee Brice	
October 23	"Fancy Like"	Walker Hayes		"My Boy"	Elvie Shane	
October 30	"Fancy Like"	Walker Hayes		"If I Didn't Love You"	Jason Aldean and Carrie Underwood	
November 6	"Fancy Like"	Walker Hayes		"If I Didn't Love You"	Jason Aldean and Carrie Underwood	
November 13	"Fancy Like"	Walker Hayes		"Fancy Like"	Walker Hayes	
November 20	"Fancy Like"	Walker Hayes		"If I Didn't Love You"	Jason Aldean and Carrie Underwood	
November 27	"All Too Well (Taylor's Version)"	Taylor Swift		"Cold as You"	Luke Combs	
December 4	"All Too Well (Taylor's Version)"	Taylor Swift		"Same Boat"	Zac Brown Band	
December 11	"All Too Well (Taylor's Version)"	Taylor Swift		"Thinking 'Bout You"	Dustin Lynch featuring MacKenzie Porter	
December 18	"Fancy Like"	Walker Hayes		"Thinking 'Bout You"	Dustin Lynch featuring MacKenzie Porter	
December 25	"Fancy Like"	Walker Hayes		"Thinking 'Bout You"	Dustin Lynch featuring MacKenzie Porter	

== See also ==
- 2021 in country music
- List of artists who reached number one on the U.S. country chart
- List of Billboard number-one country albums of 2021
