= List of Billboard number-one country songs of 2020 =

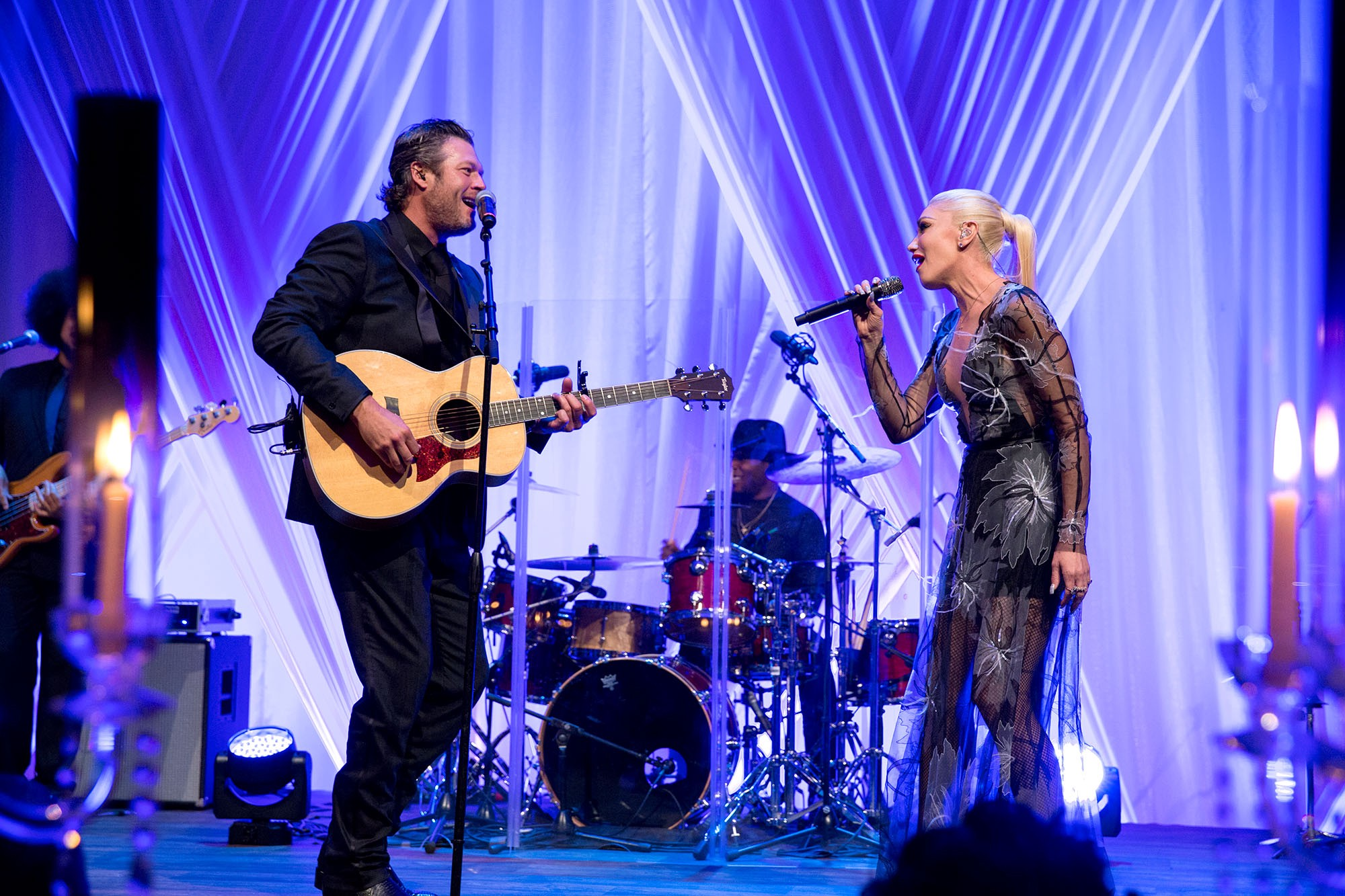
Country star Blake Shelton (second left) and his partner, pop/rock singer Gwen Stefani (right), collaborated on two Country Airplay number ones in 2020.

Hot Country Songs and Country Airplay are charts that rank the top-performing country music songs in the United States, published by Billboard magazine. Hot Country Songs ranks songs based on digital downloads, streaming, and airplay not only from country stations but from stations of all formats, a methodology introduced in 2012. Country Airplay, which began being published in 2012, is based solely on country radio airplay, a methodology that had previously been used from 1990 to 2012 for Hot Country Songs. In 2020, 13 different songs topped the Hot Country Songs chart and 39 different songs topped Country Airplay in 52 issues of the magazine.

Both charts began the year with songs at number one that had been in the top spot in the last chart of 2019; "10,000 Hours" by Dan + Shay and Justin Bieber holding the top spot on the Hot Country Songs chart, and "Even Though I'm Leaving" by Luke Combs atop the Country Airplay chart. Having spent the last 11 weeks of 2019 at number one on Hot Country Songs, "10,000 Hours" went on to spend its 15th consecutive week in the top spot in the issue of Billboard dated January 25, and in the same week topped the Country Airplay listing for the first time. The song remained at number one on Hot Country Songs until March 14, when it was displaced by "The Bones" by Maren Morris. It was the first number one on the chart for Morris and made her the first female artist to top the chart without an accompanying male act since Kelsea Ballerini with "Peter Pan" in September 2016. In May, "The Bones" spent its 11th week at number one on Hot Country Songs, surpassing Taylor Swift's "We Are Never Ever Getting Back Together" as the longest-lasting number one by a solo female artist on that chart. The song ultimately spent 19 weeks at number one.

When Jimmie Allen's "Make Me Want To" reached number one in its 58th chart week on the Country Airplay chart dated March 7, it set two records: the slowest climb to number one in that chart's history, as well as the longest chart run. In June, Travis Denning set a new mark for the longest time taken to reach the top spot when "After a Few" reached number one in its 65th week. Denning was one of a number of acts who achieved their first career number ones in 2020, along with former American Idol finalist Gabby Barrett, whose debut single "I Hope" spent one week at number one on Country Airplay in April. The song spent 21 non-consecutive weeks in the peak position on Hot Country Songs beginning in July, surpassing the new record set by Morris earlier in the year for the longest-running number one by a solo female artist. The song achieved exceptional levels of success on streaming platforms for a country song, boosted by a remix featuring pop singer Charlie Puth. Pop singer Gwen Stefani scored her first two number one singles on the Country Airplay chart with "Nobody but You" and "Happy Anywhere", both of which were collaborations with her boyfriend (subsequently fiancé) Blake Shelton. Other first-time chart toppers included Jameson Rodgers with his debut single "Some Girls", Hardy with "One Beer", which was also the first number one for featured vocalist Devin Dawson, and Parker McCollum with "Pretty Heart", which ended the year at number one. The longest-lasting number one on the Country Airplay chart was Luke Combs's "Lovin' on You", which spent four weeks at number one in September. Combs spent a total of seven weeks at number one during the year and had three chart-topping songs, both more than any other act. Jon Pardi, Sam Hunt, Luke Bryan, Blake Shelton, Gwen Stefani, Morgan Wallen, and Lee Brice each reached the top with two different songs.

== Chart history ==
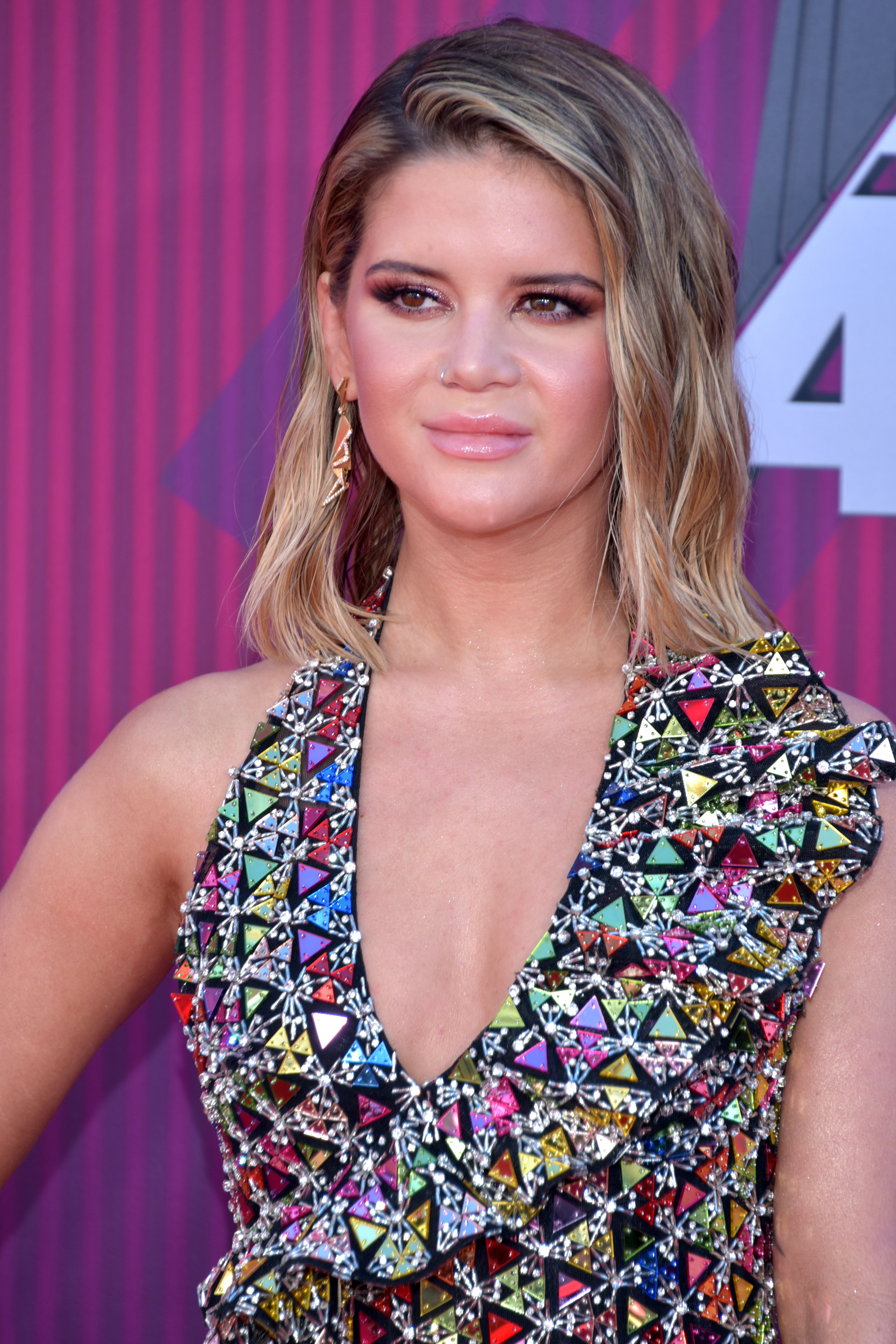
"The Bones" by Maren Morris became the longest-running number one by a female solo artist on the Hot Country Songs chart.

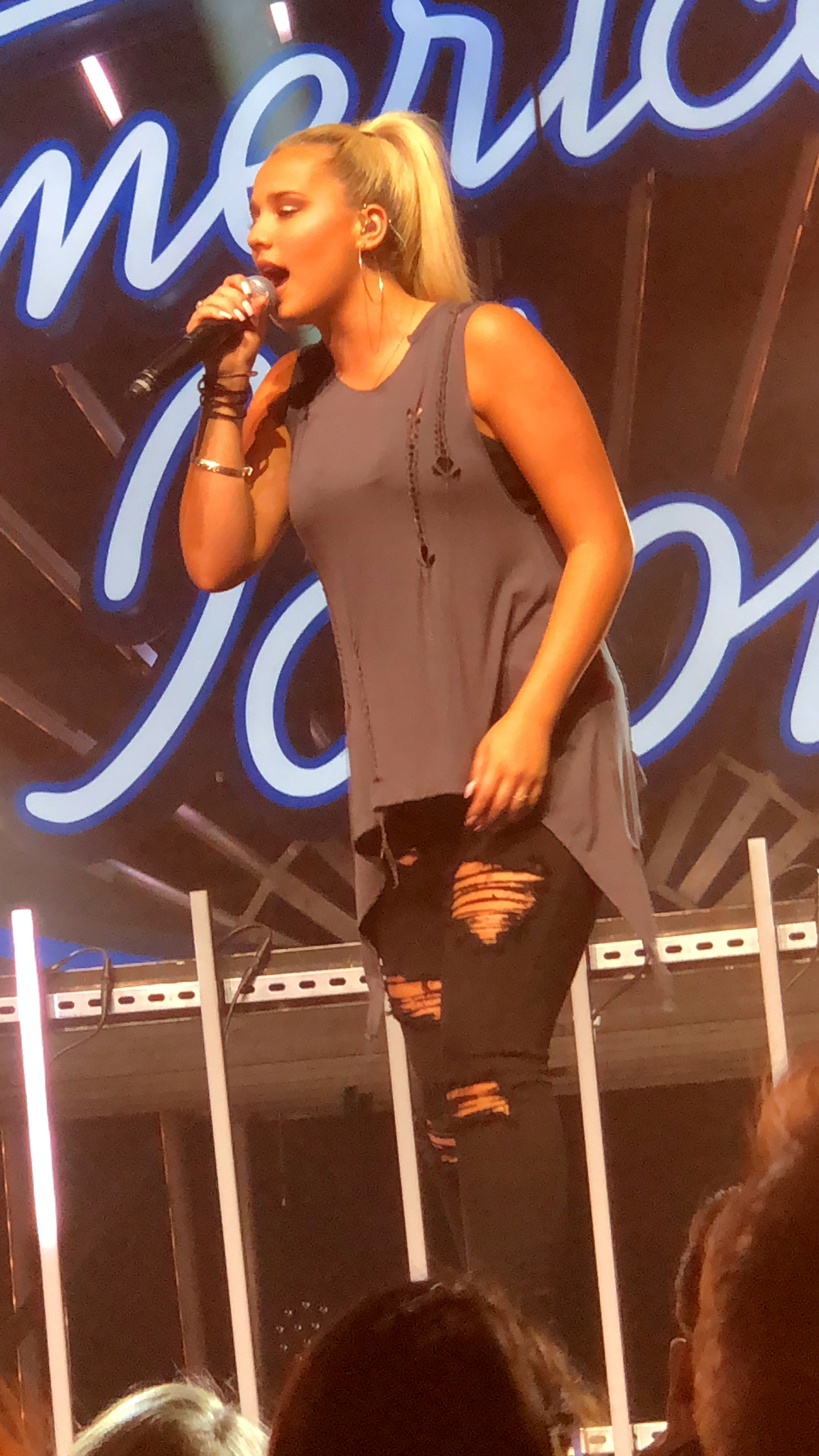
In December, "I Hope" by former American Idol contestant Gabby Barrett broke the record set by Morris.

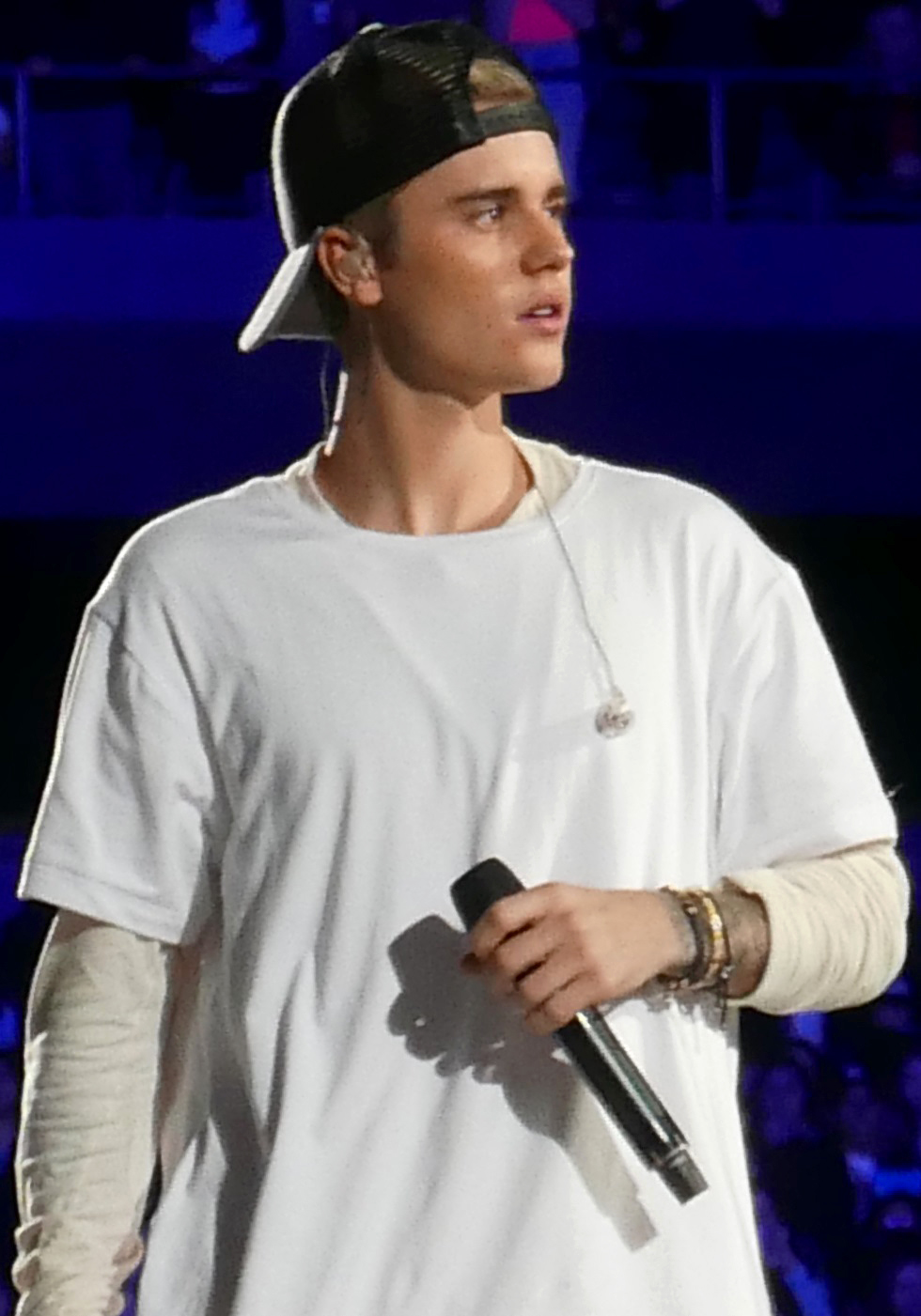
Pop singer Justin Bieber collaborated with country duo Dan + Shay on the song "10,000 Hours", which topped both charts.

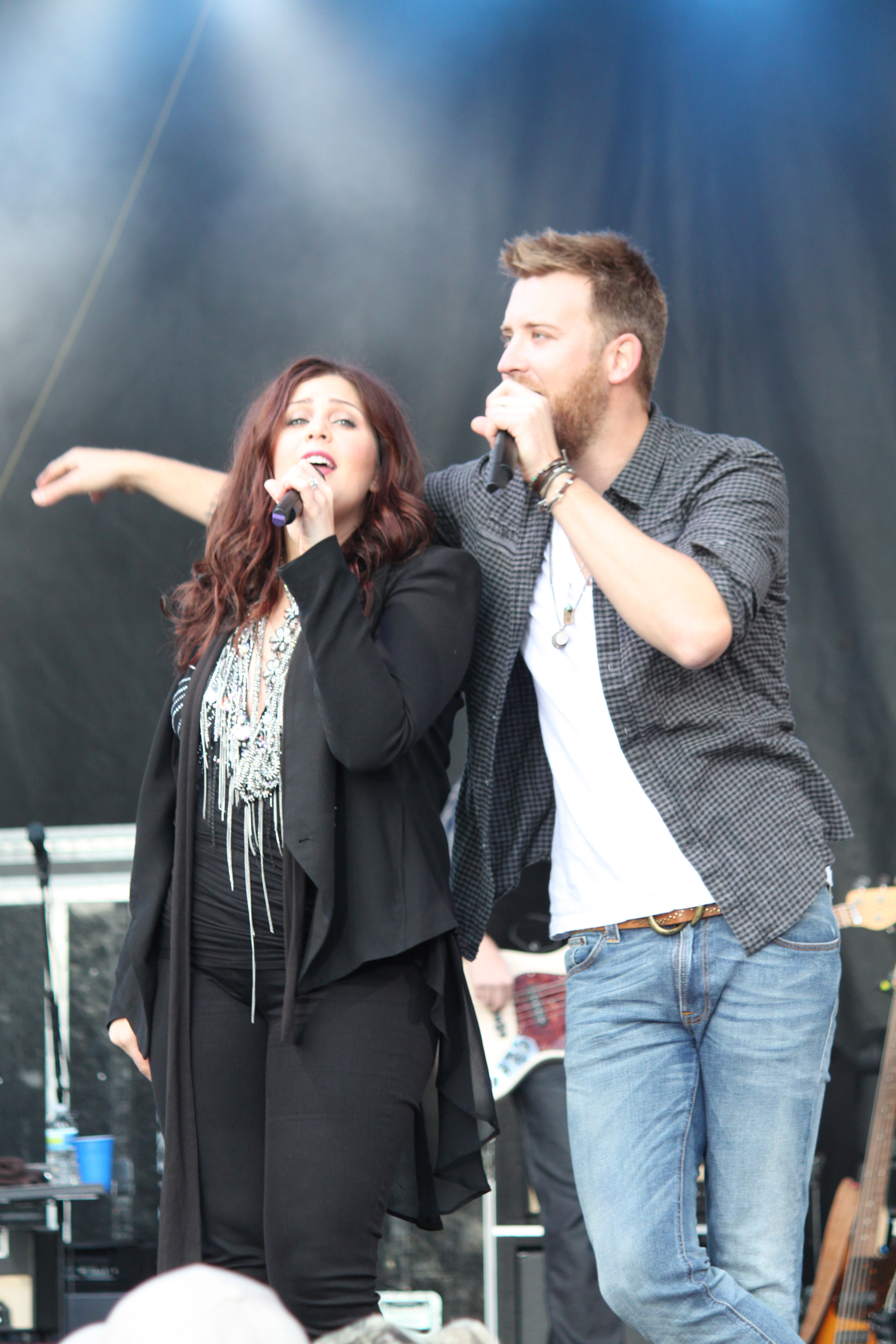
Lady Antebellum topped the Country Airplay chart in January with "What If I Never Get Over You". The group would shorten its name to Lady A later in the year.

Chart history
Issue date	Hot Country Songs			Country Airplay		
Issue date	Title	Artist(s)	Ref.	Title	Artist(s)	Ref.
January 4	"10,000 Hours"	Dan + Shay and Justin Bieber		"Even Though I'm Leaving"	Luke Combs	
January 11	"10,000 Hours"	Dan + Shay and Justin Bieber		"Ridin' Roads"	Dustin Lynch	
January 18	"10,000 Hours"	Dan + Shay and Justin Bieber		"What If I Never Get Over You"	Lady Antebellum	
January 25	"10,000 Hours"	Dan + Shay and Justin Bieber		"10,000 Hours"	Dan + Shay and Justin Bieber	
February 1	"10,000 Hours"	Dan + Shay and Justin Bieber		"10,000 Hours"	Dan + Shay and Justin Bieber	
February 8	"10,000 Hours"	Dan + Shay and Justin Bieber		"Heartache Medication"	Jon Pardi	
February 15	"10,000 Hours"	Dan + Shay and Justin Bieber		"The Bones"	Maren Morris	
February 22	"10,000 Hours"	Dan + Shay and Justin Bieber		"The Bones"	Maren Morris	
February 29	"10,000 Hours"	Dan + Shay and Justin Bieber		"Kinfolks"	Sam Hunt	
March 7	"10,000 Hours"	Dan + Shay and Justin Bieber		"Make Me Want To"	Jimmie Allen	
March 14	"The Bones"	Maren Morris		"Homesick"	Kane Brown	
March 21	"The Bones"	Maren Morris		"Homesick"	Kane Brown	
March 28	"The Bones"	Maren Morris		"Homemade"	Jake Owen	
April 4	"The Bones"	Maren Morris		"What She Wants Tonight"	Luke Bryan	
April 11	"The Bones"	Maren Morris		"Slow Dance in a Parking Lot"	Jordan Davis	
April 18	"The Bones"	Maren Morris		"Catch"	Brett Young	
April 25	"The Bones"	Maren Morris		"I Hope"	Gabby Barrett	
May 2	"The Bones"	Maren Morris		"Nobody but You"	Blake Shelton and Gwen Stefani	
May 9	"The Bones"	Maren Morris		"Nobody but You"	Blake Shelton and Gwen Stefani	
May 16	"The Bones"	Maren Morris		"Beer Can't Fix"	Thomas Rhett and Jon Pardi	
May 23	"The Bones"	Maren Morris		"Chasin' You"	Morgan Wallen	
May 30	"The Bones"	Maren Morris		"Does to Me"	Luke Combs and Eric Church	
June 6	"The Bones"	Maren Morris		"Does to Me"	Luke Combs and Eric Church	
June 13	"The Bones"	Maren Morris		"After a Few"	Travis Denning	
June 20	"The Bones"	Maren Morris		"I Hope You're Happy Now"	Carly Pearce and Lee Brice	
June 27	"The Bones"	Maren Morris		"In Between"	Scotty McCreery	
July 4	"The Bones"	Maren Morris		"Here and Now"	Kenny Chesney	
July 11	"The Bones"	Maren Morris		"One Margarita"	Luke Bryan	
July 18	"The Bones"	Maren Morris		"One Margarita"	Luke Bryan	
July 25	"I Hope"	Gabby Barrett		"Hard to Forget"	Sam Hunt	
August 1	"I Hope"	Gabby Barrett		"Bluebird"	Miranda Lambert	
August 8	"I Hope"	Gabby Barrett		"Done"	Chris Janson	
August 15	"I Hope"	Gabby Barrett		"Done"	Chris Janson	
August 22	"I Hope"	Gabby Barrett		"Die from a Broken Heart"	Maddie & Tae	
August 29	"7 Summers"	Morgan Wallen		"Why We Drink"	Justin Moore	
September 5	"I Hope"	Gabby Barrett		"Lovin' on You"	Luke Combs	
September 12	"I Hope"	Gabby Barrett		"Lovin' on You"	Luke Combs	
September 19	"I Hope"	Gabby Barrett		"Lovin' on You"	Luke Combs	
September 26	"I Hope"	Gabby Barrett		"Lovin' on You"	Luke Combs	
October 3	"I Hope"	Gabby Barrett		"One of Them Girls"	Lee Brice	
October 10	"I Hope"	Gabby Barrett		"One of Them Girls"	Lee Brice	
October 17	"I Hope"	Gabby Barrett		"One of Them Girls"	Lee Brice	
October 24	"I Hope"	Gabby Barrett		"Got What I Got"	Jason Aldean	
October 31	"I Hope"	Gabby Barrett		"Some Girls"	Jameson Rodgers	
November 7	"Forever After All"	Luke Combs		"Everywhere but On"	Matt Stell	
November 14	"I Hope"	Gabby Barrett		"Love You Like I Used To"	Russell Dickerson	
November 21	"I Hope"	Gabby Barrett		"Love You Like I Used To"	Russell Dickerson	
November 28	"I Hope"	Gabby Barrett		"More Than My Hometown"	Morgan Wallen	
December 5	"I Hope"	Gabby Barrett		"One Beer"	Hardy featuring Lauren Alaina and Devin Dawson	
December 12	"I Hope"	Gabby Barrett		"Happy Anywhere"	Blake Shelton featuring Gwen Stefani	
December 19	"I Hope"	Gabby Barrett		"Big, Big Plans"	Chris Lane	
December 26	"I Hope"	Gabby Barrett		"Pretty Heart"	Parker McCollum	

== See also ==
- 2020 in music
- List of artists who reached number one on the U.S. country chart
- List of Billboard number-one country albums of 2020
