= The Prequel (EP) =

EP by Luke Combs
- Released: June 7, 2019
- Length: 16:54
- Labels: River House Artists; Columbia Nashville
- Producer: Scott Moffatt

Luke Combs chronology
This One's for You (2017)	The Prequel (2019)	What You See Is What You Get (2019)

Singles from The Prequel
- 1. "Beer Never Broke My Heart" Released: May 8, 2019; 2. "Even Though I'm Leaving" Released: September 9, 2019; 3. "Lovin' on You" Released: June 22, 2020

The Prequel is the fourth extended play by American country singer Luke Combs. It was released through River House Artists and Columbia Nashville on June 7, 2019.It includes the singles "Beer Never Broke My Heart" and "Even Though I'm Leaving." All five tracks from The Prequel are included on Combs' album What You See Is What You Get. It peaked at number four in Canada and the United States.

== Commercial performance ==
The Prequel debuted at number four on the US Billboard 200 with 48,000 album-equivalent units, of which 22,000 were pure album sales. It is Combs' second US top 10 album. It has sold 42,200 copies in the United States as of September 2019.

== Track listing ==
No.	Title	Writer(s)	Length
1.	"Beer Never Broke My Heart"	Luke Combs; Randy Montana; Jonathan Singleton	3:06
2.	"Refrigerator Door"	Combs; Jordan Brooker	3:24
3.	"Even Though I'm Leaving"	Combs; Wyatt B. Durrette III; Ray Fulcher	3:45
4.	"Lovin' on You"	Combs; Thomas Archer; Fulcher; James McNair	3:15
5.	"Moon Over Mexico"	Combs; Fulcher; Dan Isbell; Singleton	3:24
Total length:			16:54

== Personnel ==
From The Prequel liner notes.

- Luke Combs – lead vocals
- Jon Conley – acoustic guitar, electric guitar, banjo
- Wil Houchens – piano, organ, synthesizer, Wurlitzer
- Buddy Leach – saxophone
- Sol Philcox-Littlefield – electric guitar
- Carl Miner – acoustic guitar, banjo, mandolin
- Scott Moffatt – electric guitar, glockenspiel, synthesizer, claps, background vocals
- Gary Morse – pedal steel guitar, lap steel guitar
- Jerry Roe – drums, percussion
- Jimmie Lee Sloas – bass guitar

== Charts ==
=== Weekly charts ===
Chart (2019)	Peak position
Canadian Albums (Billboard)	4
Scottish Albums (Official Charts)	56
US Billboard 200	4
US Top Country Albums (Billboard)	1

=== Year-end charts ===
Chart (2019)	Position
US Billboard 200	156
US Top Country Albums (Billboard)	18
