= List of Top Country Albums number ones of 2021 =

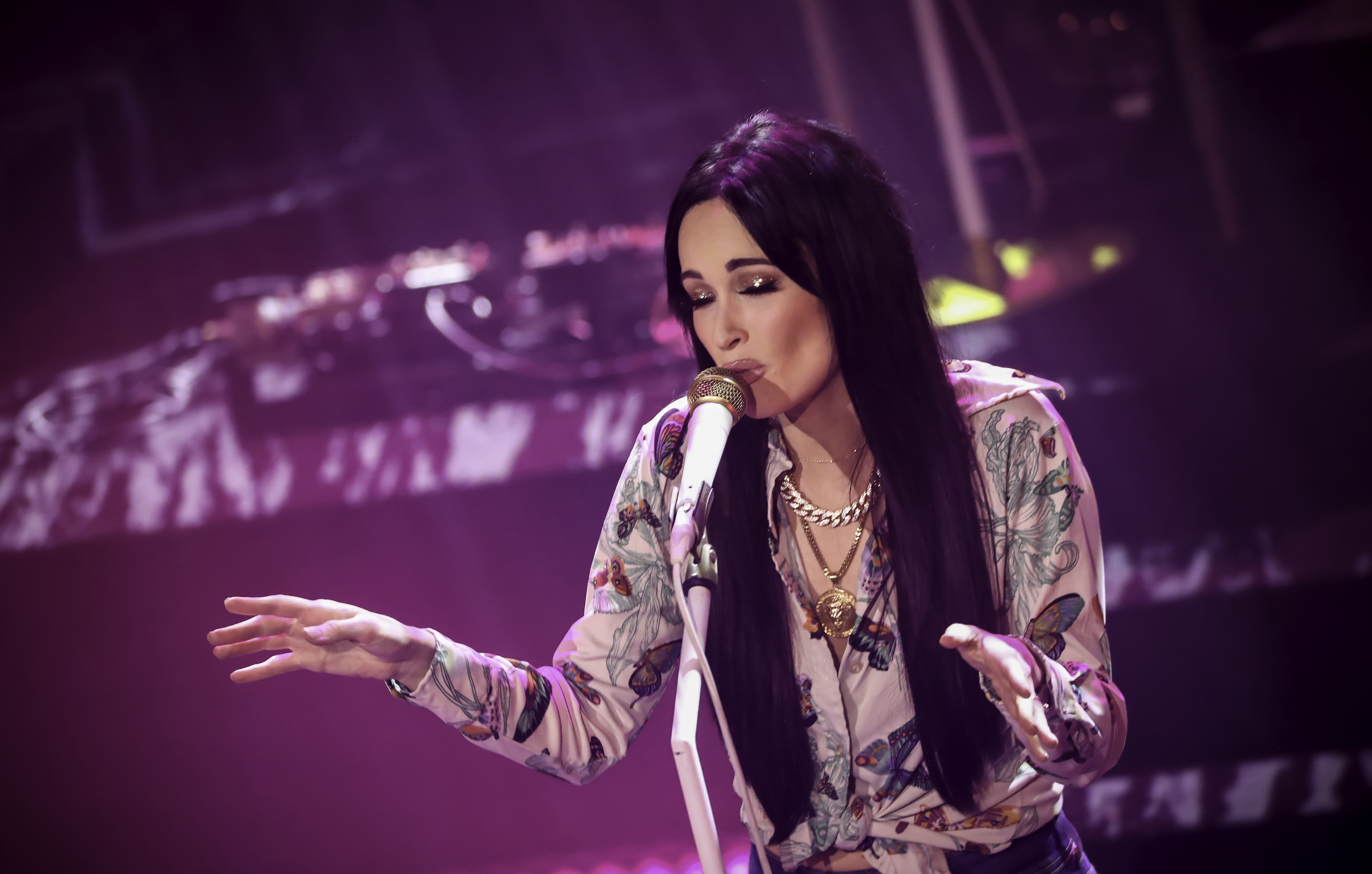
Kacey Musgraves topped the chart in September with Star-Crossed.

Top Country Albums is a chart that ranks the top-performing country music albums in the United States, published by Billboard. Chart positions are based on multi-metric consumption, blending traditional album sales, track equivalent albums, and streaming equivalent albums.

In the issue of Billboard dated January 2, My Gift by Carrie Underwood was at number one, retaining the position it had held the previous week. Underwood would return to number one in April with her next album, My Savior. The only other artist with multiple number ones in 2021 was Taylor Swift, who spent time in the peak position with both Fearless (Taylor's Version) and Red (Taylor's Version). Both were complete re-recordings of albums from earlier in her career, which she released following a dispute regarding ownership of the masters to her first six studio albums.

For much of the year, the number-one position was dominated by Dangerous: The Double Album by Morgan Wallen. The album entered the chart at number one in the issue of Billboard dated January 23, and held the top spot for 11 consecutive weeks. It returned to the peak position for a single week in the issue dated April 17, and reached number one again in the issue dated May 8. By the end of the year, the album had spent a total of 39 weeks atop the chart. It also debuted at number one on the all-genres Billboard 200 chart, more than doubling the record for the highest weekly number of on-demand streams by a country album.

== Chart history ==
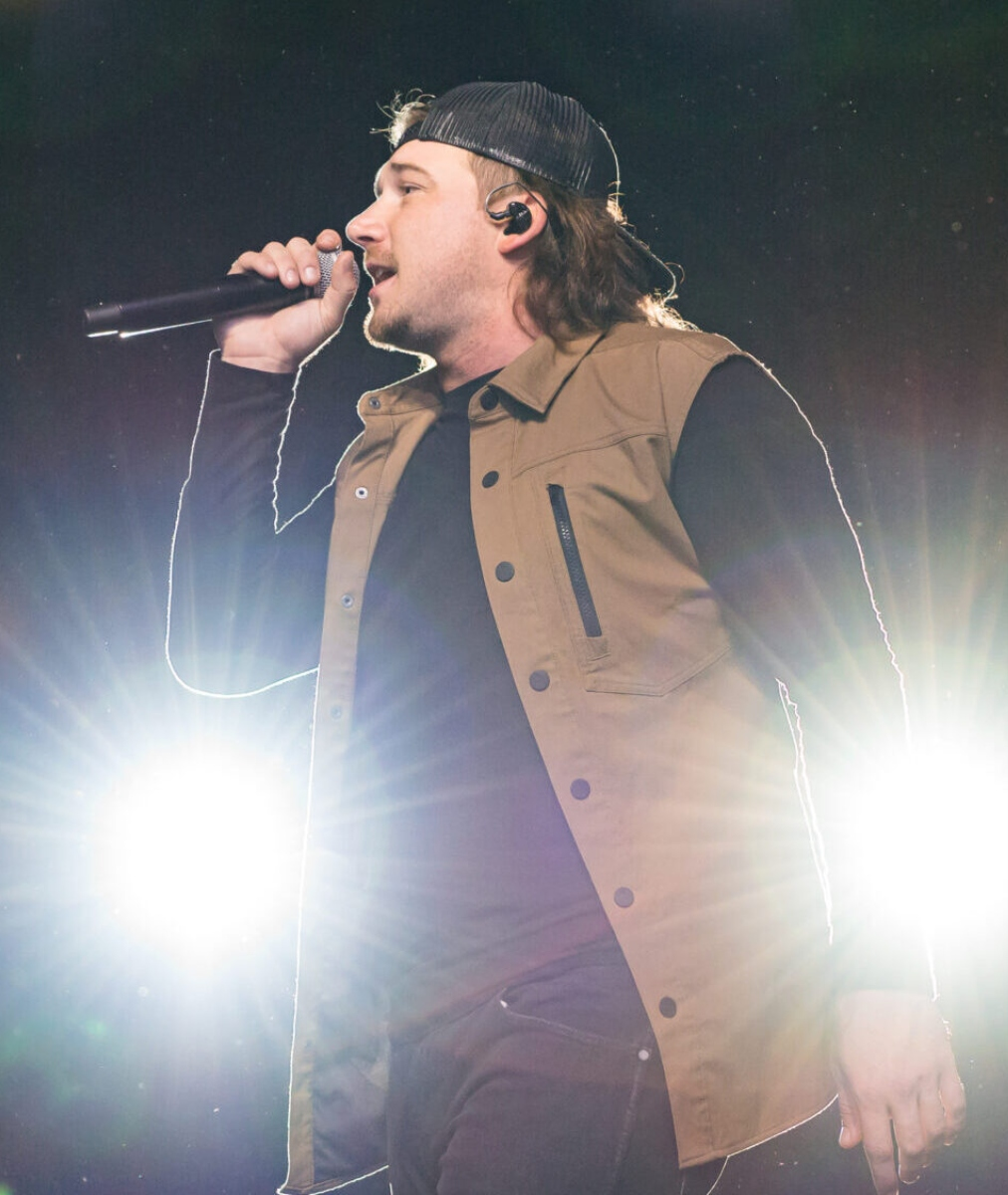
Morgan Wallen's record-breaking Dangerous: The Double Album spent most of 2021 at the number one spot on the chart.

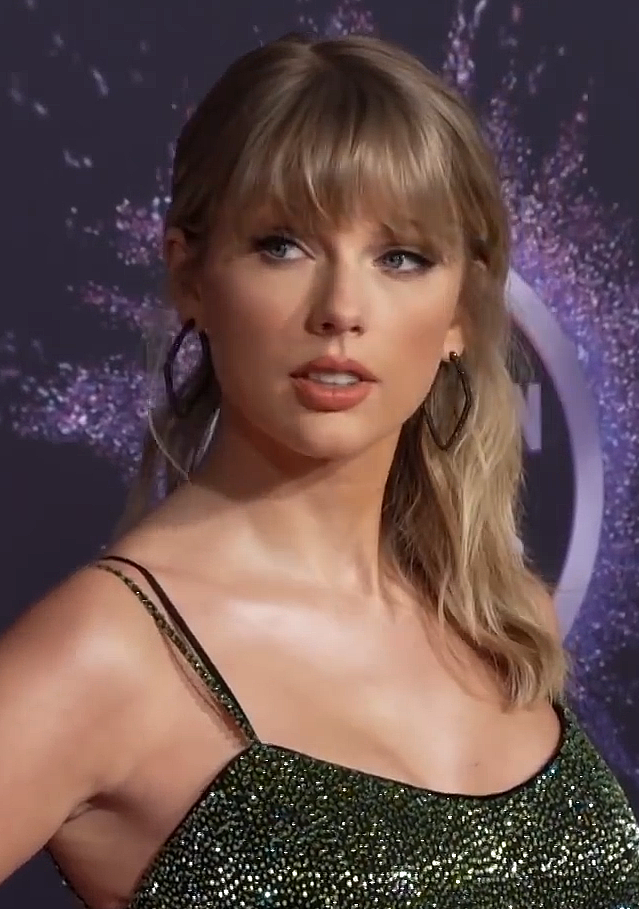
Taylor Swift had two number ones with re-recorded versions of earlier albums.

Issue date	Title	Artist(s)	Ref.
January 2	My Gift	Carrie Underwood	
January 9	What You See Is What You Get	Luke Combs	
January 16	What You See Is What You Get	Luke Combs	
January 23	Dangerous: The Double Album	Morgan Wallen	
January 30	Dangerous: The Double Album	Morgan Wallen	
February 6	Dangerous: The Double Album	Morgan Wallen	
February 13	Dangerous: The Double Album	Morgan Wallen	
February 20	Dangerous: The Double Album	Morgan Wallen	
February 27	Dangerous: The Double Album	Morgan Wallen	
March 6	Dangerous: The Double Album	Morgan Wallen	
March 13	Dangerous: The Double Album	Morgan Wallen	
March 20	Dangerous: The Double Album	Morgan Wallen	
March 27	Dangerous: The Double Album	Morgan Wallen	
April 3	Dangerous: The Double Album	Morgan Wallen	
April 10	My Savior	Carrie Underwood	
April 17	Dangerous: The Double Album	Morgan Wallen	
April 24	Fearless (Taylor's Version)	Taylor Swift	
May 1	Fearless (Taylor's Version)	Taylor Swift	
May 8	Dangerous: The Double Album	Morgan Wallen	
May 15	Dangerous: The Double Album	Morgan Wallen	
May 22	Dangerous: The Double Album	Morgan Wallen	
May 29	Dangerous: The Double Album	Morgan Wallen	
June 5	Dangerous: The Double Album	Morgan Wallen	
June 12	Dangerous: The Double Album	Morgan Wallen	
June 19	Dangerous: The Double Album	Morgan Wallen	
June 26	Dangerous: The Double Album	Morgan Wallen	
July 3	Dangerous: The Double Album	Morgan Wallen	
July 10	Dangerous: The Double Album	Morgan Wallen	
July 17	Dangerous: The Double Album	Morgan Wallen	
July 24	Dangerous: The Double Album	Morgan Wallen	
July 31	Dangerous: The Double Album	Morgan Wallen	
August 7	Dangerous: The Double Album	Morgan Wallen	
August 14	Dangerous: The Double Album	Morgan Wallen	
August 21	Dangerous: The Double Album	Morgan Wallen	
August 28	Dangerous: The Double Album	Morgan Wallen	
September 4	Dangerous: The Double Album	Morgan Wallen	
September 11	Dangerous: The Double Album	Morgan Wallen	
September 18	Dangerous: The Double Album	Morgan Wallen	
September 25	Star-Crossed	Kacey Musgraves	
October 2	Dangerous: The Double Album	Morgan Wallen	
October 9	Dangerous: The Double Album	Morgan Wallen	
October 16	Fearless (Taylor's Version)	Taylor Swift	
October 23	Dangerous: The Double Album	Morgan Wallen	
October 30	Dangerous: The Double Album	Morgan Wallen	
November 6	Dangerous: The Double Album	Morgan Wallen	
November 13	Dangerous: The Double Album	Morgan Wallen	
November 20	Dangerous: The Double Album	Morgan Wallen	
November 27	Red (Taylor's Version)	Taylor Swift	
December 4	Red (Taylor's Version)	Taylor Swift	
December 11	Red (Taylor's Version)	Taylor Swift	
December 18	Red (Taylor's Version)	Taylor Swift	
December 25	Red (Taylor's Version)	Taylor Swift	

== See also ==
- 2021 in country music
- List of Billboard number-one country songs of 2021
