= Cold as You =

2021 single by Luke Combs

Single by Luke Combs

from the album What You See Is What You Get
- Released: July 19, 2021
- Genre: Country
- Length: 3:06
- Label: River House; Columbia Nashville
- Songwriter(s): Randy Montana; Luke Combs; Jonathan Singleton; Shane Minor
- Producer(s): Chip Matthews; Jonathan Singleton; Luke Combs

Luke Combs singles chronology
"Forever After All" (2021)	"Cold as You" (2021)	"Doin' This" (2021)

Music video
- "Cold as You" on YouTube

"Cold as You" is a song by American country music singer Luke Combs, It was released on July 19, 2021, as the seventh single from the deluxe edition of his second studio album What You See Is What You Get. The song was co-written by Randy Montana, Shane Minor, Jonathan Singleton and Combs, who also produced the track with Singleton and Chip Matthews.

== Background ==
On October 5, 2020, Combs uploaded an acoustic rendition of "Cold as You" and dedicated it to his parents, wife and fans.

== Content ==
"Cold as You" was described by Outsider as a "story of a broken-hearted guy finding his way to a barstool".

== Music video ==
The music video was uploaded on August 25, 2021, and was directed by TA Films. It showcases a man through a night after he escapes his ex-girlfriend and her new lover via a secret door in the back of a jukebox in a nostalgic diner. In addition to the couple featured in the "Hurricane" music video, other supporting actors make cameos in the music video as the characters from other of Combs' music videos, including the grandfather and granddaughter from "Forever After All", childhood versions of Combs and his wife, Nicole, from "Lovin' on You", and the rejected proposer and his bartender from "Beer Never Broke My Heart".

== Live performance ==
Combs performed the song at the 2020 CMA Awards and 2021 CMT Music Awards.

== Charts ==
=== Weekly charts ===
Weekly chart performance for "Cold as You"
Chart (2021)	Peak position
Australia Country Hot 50 (TMN)	2
Canada (Canadian Hot 100)	46
Canada Country (Billboard)	1
Global 200 (Billboard)	190
US Billboard Hot 100	32
US Country Airplay (Billboard)	1
US Hot Country Songs (Billboard)	5

=== Year-end charts ===
2021 year-end chart performance for "Cold as You"
Chart (2021)	Position
US Country Airplay (Billboard)	53
US Hot Country Songs (Billboard)	54

2022 year-end chart performance for "Cold as You"
Chart (2022)	Position
US Country Airplay (Billboard)	55
US Hot Country Songs (Billboard)	66

== Certifications ==
Region	Certification	Certified units/sales
Australia (ARIA)	Gold	35,000^{‡}
New Zealand (RMNZ)	Gold	15,000^{‡}
United States (RIAA)	Platinum	1,000,000^{‡}
^{‡} Sales+streaming figures based on certification alone.

== Release history ==
Release history for "Cold as You"
Region	Date	Format	Label	Ref.
Various	October 23, 2020	Digital download; streaming	River House; Columbia Nashville	
United States	July 19, 2021	Country radio	River House; Columbia Nashville	
