= List of Top Country Albums number ones of 2020 =

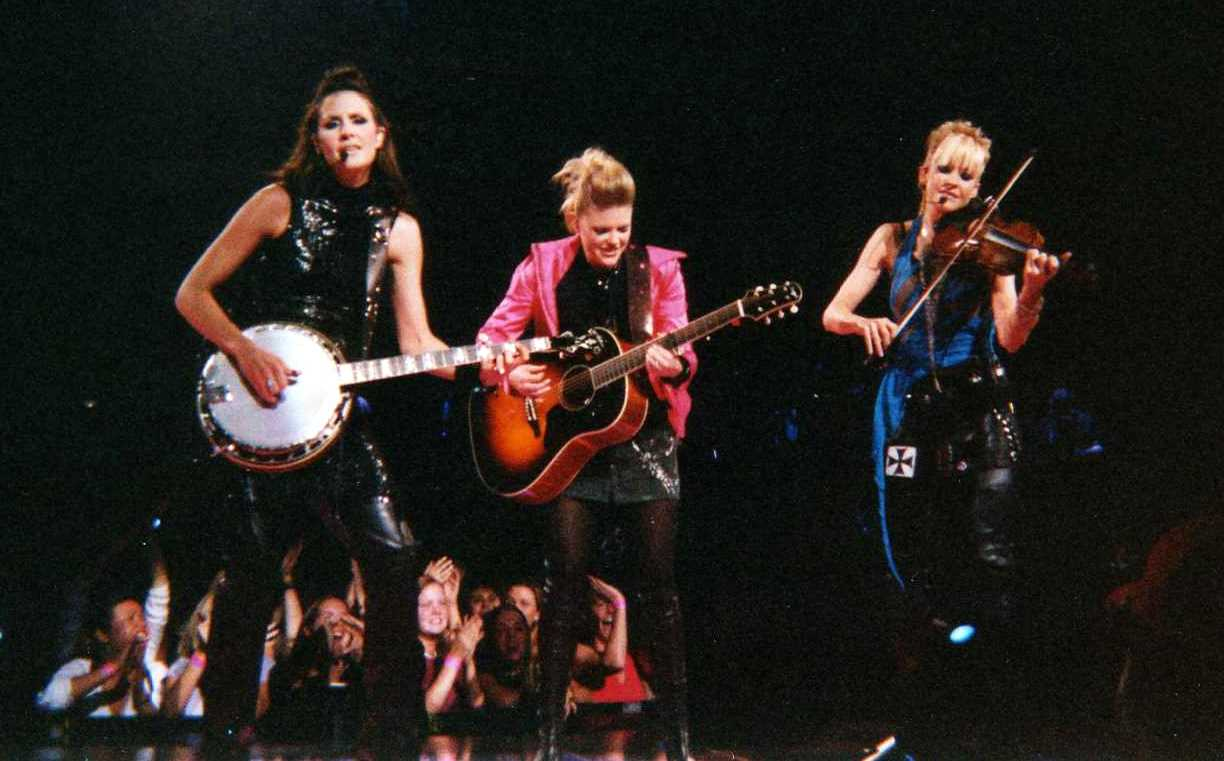
The Chicks reached number one with Gaslighter, their first new album since 2006 and their first since they changed their name from the Dixie Chicks.

Top Country Albums is a chart that ranks the top-performing country music albums in the United States, published by Billboard. In 2020, 16 different albums topped the chart, based on multi-metric consumption, blending traditional album sales, track equivalent albums, and streaming equivalent albums.

In the issue of Billboard dated January 4, Burl Ives topped the chart with Rudolph the Red-Nosed Reindeer, the soundtrack album of the 1964 Rankin/Bass television special of the same name. It was the first number-one country album for Ives, a musician and Academy Award-winning actor who had died in 1995. It was the first of two posthumous chart-toppers in 2020; Kenny Rogers, who died on March 20, entered the chart at number one in the issue dated April 4 with The Best of Kenny Rogers: Through the Years. The compilation album was the first number-one country album for Rogers since 1986. Beginning with the January 11 issue, the number-one position was dominated in 2020 by Luke Combs, who spent 31 weeks in the top spot during the year with his album What You See Is What You Get; no other act spent more than four weeks at number one. Combs's album also topped the all-genre Billboard 200 albums chart in November following the release of a deluxe edition with additional tracks; in the first week after that release the album set a new streaming record for a country music album.

One act topped the chart for the first time in 2020: Morgan Wallen spent two non-consecutive weeks in the top spot with his debut full-length album If I Know Me. Two acts each reached number one for the first time since 2006: Jimmy Buffett with Life on the Flip Side and the Chicks with Gaslighter. The latter album was the all-female trio's first album of new material for fourteen years and their first since they changed their name from the Dixie Chicks. The year's final chart-topper was the Christmas album My Gift by Carrie Underwood. Having spent a single week at number one in October, it returned to the peak position in the issue of Billboard dated December 12 and stayed there for the remainder of the year. It was one of two holiday albums to top the chart in 2020, along with A Holly Dolly Christmas by veteran country star Dolly Parton.

== Chart history ==
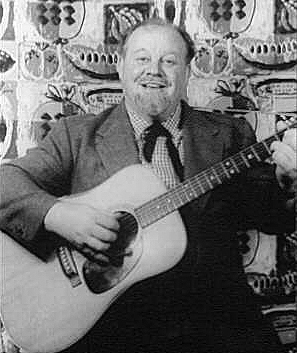
Singer and actor Burl Ives spent a week at number one in January, nearly 25 years after he died.

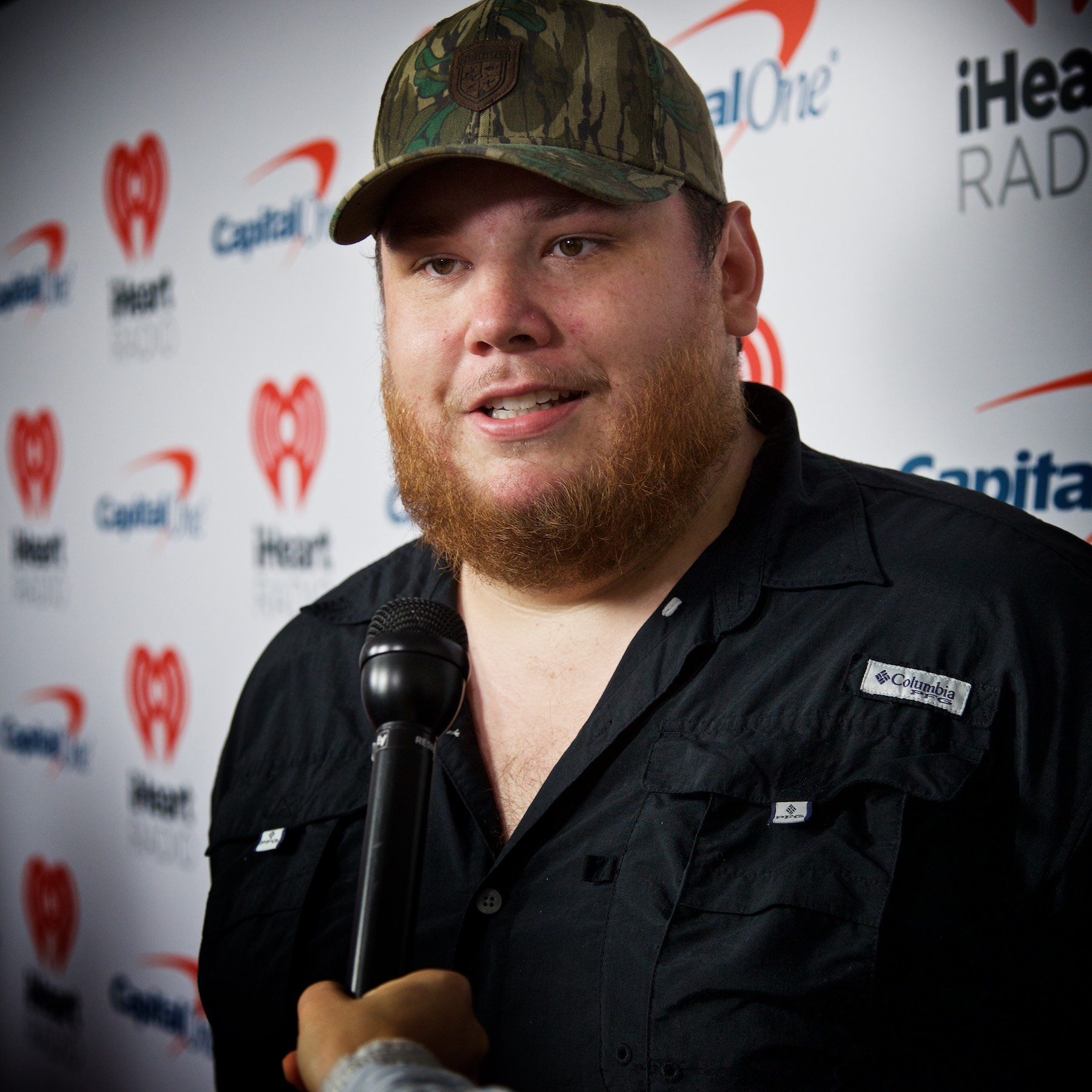
Luke Combs dominated the top of the chart in 2020, spending more than half of the year at number one.

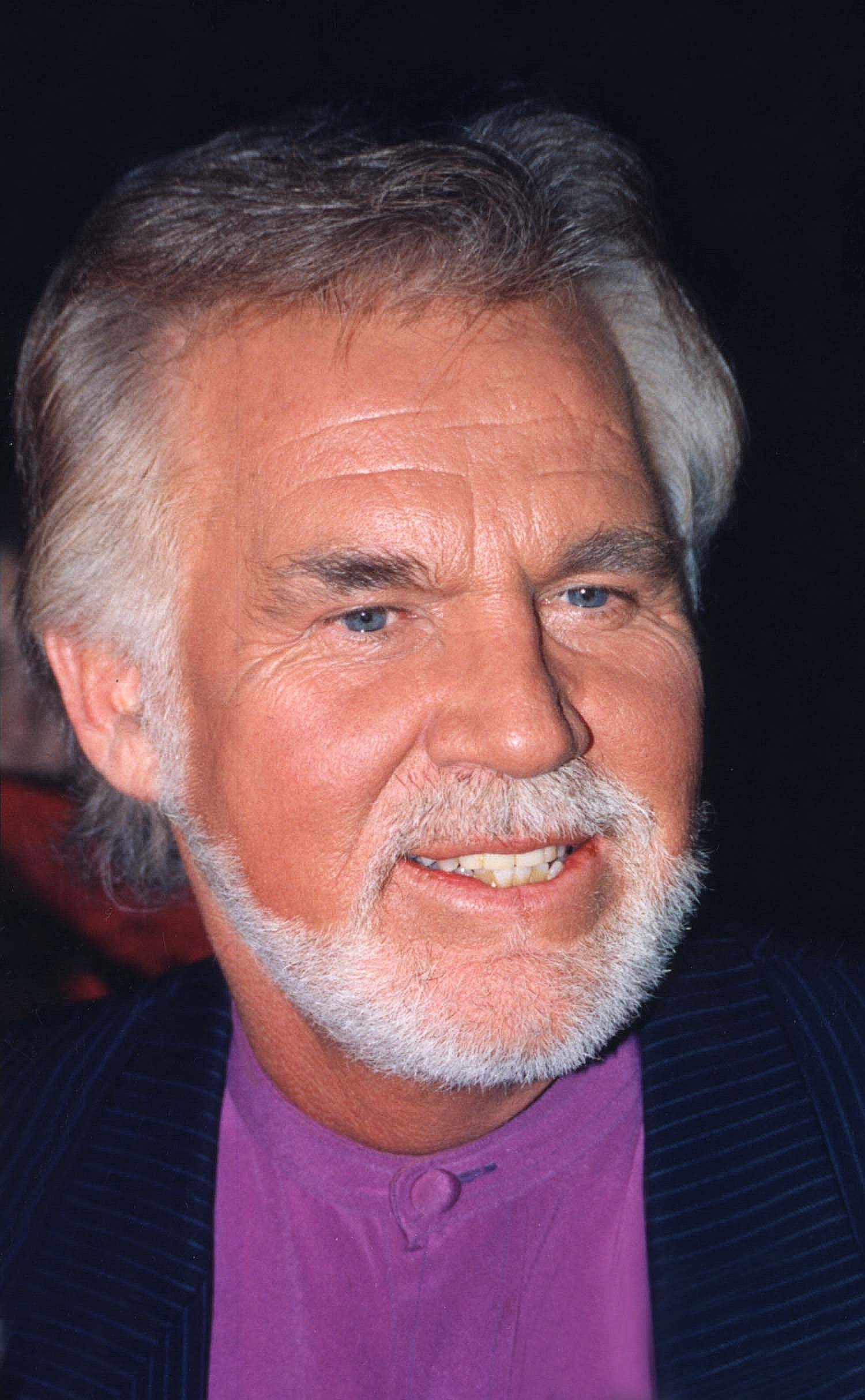
Kenny Rogers topped the chart shortly after he died in March.

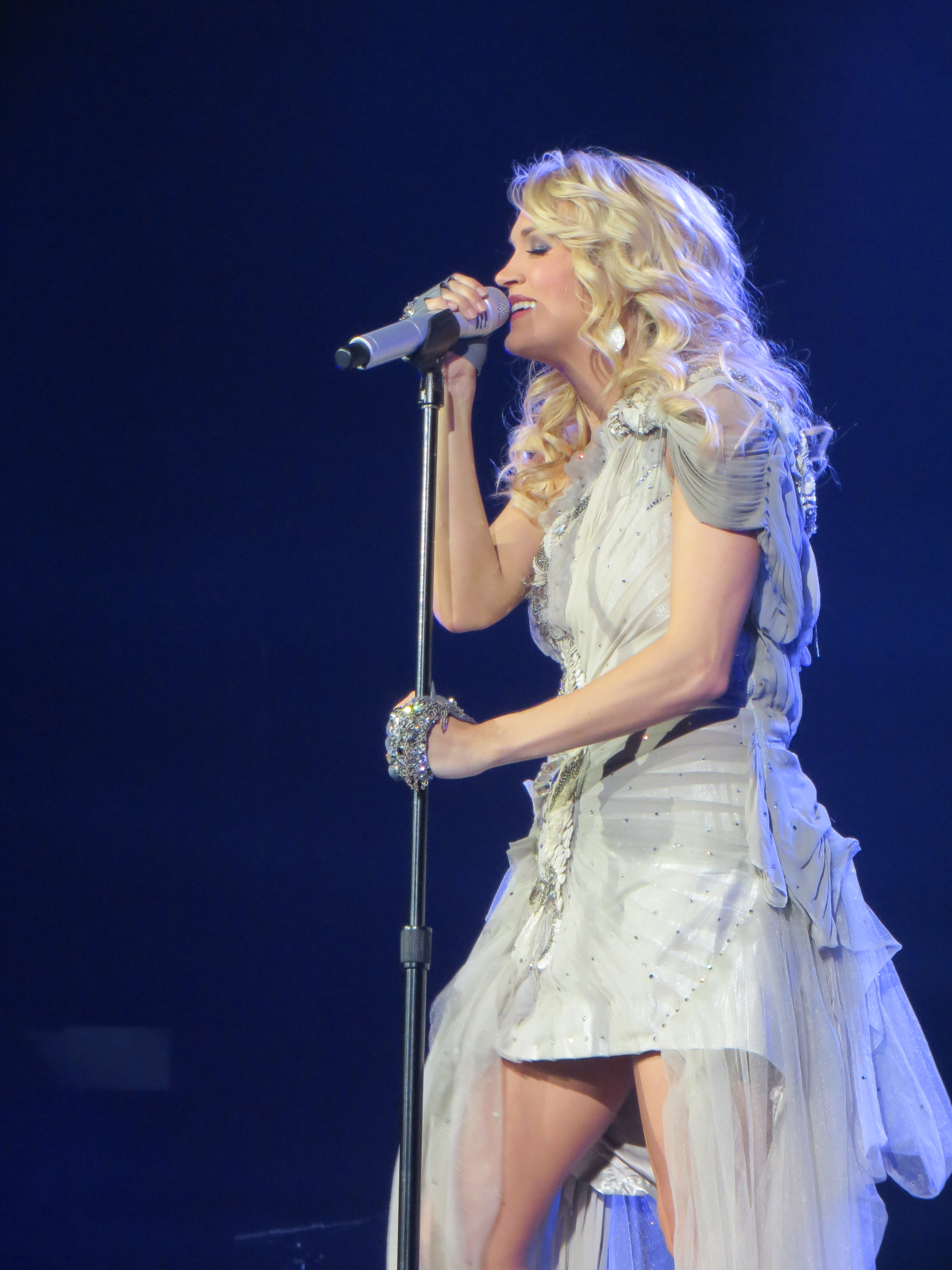
Carrie Underwood ended the year at number one with her holiday album My Gift.

Issue date	Title	Artist(s)	Ref.
January 4	Rudolph the Red-Nosed Reindeer	Burl Ives	
January 11	What You See Is What You Get	Luke Combs	
January 18	What You See Is What You Get	Luke Combs	
January 25	What You See Is What You Get	Luke Combs	
February 1	Nightfall	Little Big Town	
February 8	What You See Is What You Get	Luke Combs	
February 15	What You See Is What You Get	Luke Combs	
February 22	What You See Is What You Get	Luke Combs	
February 29	What You See Is What You Get	Luke Combs	
March 7	What You See Is What You Get	Luke Combs	
March 14	What You See Is What You Get	Luke Combs	
March 21	What You See Is What You Get	Luke Combs	
March 28	What You See Is What You Get	Luke Combs	
April 4	The Best of Kenny Rogers: Through the Years	Kenny Rogers	
April 11	What You See Is What You Get	Luke Combs	
April 18	Southside	Sam Hunt	
April 25	Southside	Sam Hunt	
May 2	What You See Is What You Get	Luke Combs	
May 9	What You See Is What You Get	Luke Combs	
May 16	Here and Now	Kenny Chesney	
May 23	What You See Is What You Get	Luke Combs	
May 30	Reunions	Jason Isbell and the 400 Unit	
June 6	What You See Is What You Get	Luke Combs	
June 13	Life on the Flip Side	Jimmy Buffett	
June 20	What You See Is What You Get	Luke Combs	
June 27	What You See Is What You Get	Luke Combs	
July 4	What You See Is What You Get	Luke Combs	
July 11	What You See Is What You Get	Luke Combs	
July 18	What You See Is What You Get	Luke Combs	
July 25	What You See Is What You Get	Luke Combs	
August 1	Gaslighter	The Chicks	
August 8	Gaslighter	The Chicks	
August 15	If I Know Me	Morgan Wallen	
August 22	Born Here Live Here Die Here	Luke Bryan	
August 29	If I Know Me	Morgan Wallen	
September 5	Here on Earth	Tim McGraw	
September 12	What You See Is What You Get	Luke Combs	
September 19	What You See Is What You Get	Luke Combs	
September 26	What You See Is What You Get	Luke Combs	
October 3	The Speed of Now Part 1	Keith Urban	
October 10	My Gift	Carrie Underwood	
October 17	A Holly Dolly Christmas	Dolly Parton	
October 24	What You See Is What You Get	Luke Combs	
October 31	What You See Is What You Get	Luke Combs	
November 7	What You See Is What You Get	Luke Combs	
November 14	What You See Is What You Get	Luke Combs	
November 21	What You See Is What You Get	Luke Combs	
November 28	Starting Over	Chris Stapleton	
December 5	What You See Is What You Get	Luke Combs	
December 12	My Gift	Carrie Underwood	
December 19	My Gift	Carrie Underwood	
December 26	My Gift	Carrie Underwood	

== See also ==
- 2020 in music
- List of Billboard number-one country songs of 2020
