= Backslider (album) =

Studio album by Elvie Shane
- Released: October 29, 2021
- Genre: Country
- Length: 53:14
- Label: Wheelhouse
- Producer: Oscar Charles

Elvie Shane chronology
Backslider (2021)	Damascus (2024)

Singles from Backslider
- 1. "My Boy" Released: September 21, 2020; 2. "County Roads" Released: February 7, 2022

Backslider is the debut studio album by American country music singer Elvie Shane. It was released through Wheelhouse on October 29, 2021, for digital download/streaming, and made available on CD on February 11, 2022. It includes the singles "My Boy" and "County Roads".

== Content ==
Shane co-wrote all of the album's 15 tracks, with the exception of "Kickin' Stones", which is a spoken word interlude by The Fletch. It was preceded by the release of the EP County Roads, which featured six of the album's tracks. Tenille Townes is featured on "Nothin' Lasts Forever", and Shane's mother guests on the closing track, "Miles", which he wrote as a tribute to his father, inspired by his career as a truck driver. Oscar Charles produced the album.

The album title was inspired by a conversation Shane had with a preacher friend of his who referred to him as a "backslider". He favorably embraced the terminology as just being "human", saying: "Love found, love lost. Mistakes made in the recklessness of youth, lessons learned from mistakes made". A country music record, Backslider draws additional inspiration from southern rock, R&B, and gospel genres. Topically, the album is described as "[weaving] between blessings and contradictions" and displaying "a messy honesty" inspired in equal parts by Shane's rebellious upbringing and his Christian faith. Shane informally defined Backslider as having three distinct chapters inspired by his life: "The Dazed and Confused Year" (inspired by his reckless youth), "The Mandy Years" (dedicated to his wife and turning his life around), and "The Nashville Years" (as a tribute to his appreciation for country music).

The first song written for the record was "My Boy", which went viral on social media in 2018, and led to Shane eventually signing a record deal with BBR Music Group in 2019. It was released as Shane's debut single to country radio on September 21, 2020. It became a number one hit on the Billboard Country Airplay chart on the week dated October 23, 2021, and was certified Platinum by the RIAA. "Country Roads" was released as the album's second single on February 7, 2022, and it debuted (and peaked) at number 60 on the Country Airplay chart.

== Critical reception ==
Rolling Stone Australia named Backslider number 23 on their list of the 25 Best Country and Americana Albums of 2021. Lee Zimmerman of Holler gave the album a 7.5/10 ranking, calling it "a tenacious debut that paints a vivid picture of life in rural America and the blue-collar attitudes that define so many of those that reside within those realms".

== Track listing ==
Backslider track listing
No.	Title	Writer(s)	Length
1.	"I Will Run"	Elvie Shane; Doug Johnson; Adam Wood	3:25
2.	"Love, Cold Beer, Cheap Smoke"	Shane; Drew Green; Russell Sutton	3:19
3.	"Sundays in the South"	Shane; Albert E. Brumley; Derrick Southerland	3:15
4.	"Sundress"	Shane; Johnson; Wood	3:30
5.	"County Roads"	Shane; Oscar Charles; Dan Couch	3:11
6.	"Rocket Science"	Shane; Charles; Jakob Miller; Joybeth Taylor	4:25
7.	"My Kinda Trouble"	Shane; Erik Dylan; Ray Fulcher	2:37
8.	"Kickin' Stones" (featuring The Fletch)	Tom Bukovac; Kris Donegan; Fred Eltringham; Steven Mackey; Rob McNelley; Matt Nolen	1:09
9.	"Saturday Night Me"	Shane; Johnson; Wood	4:02
10.	"My Boy"	Shane; Nick Columbia; Lee Starr; Sutton	3:23
11.	"Heartbreaks & Headaches"	Shane; Dakota Payton	3:24
12.	"Nothin' Lasts Forever" (featuring Tenille Townes)	Shane; Charles; Luke Preston; Matt Willis	3:09
13.	"Keep On Strummin'"	Shane; Charles; Couch; Clinton Payton	3:13
14.	"My Mississippi"	Shane; Miller	4:01
15.	"Miles" (featuring Elvie Shane's Mama)	Shane; Preston; Jonathan Sherwood	7:05
Total length:			53:14
