= Bet You're from a Small Town =

Bet You're from Small Town

Studio album by Jameson Rodgers
- Released: September 17, 2021
- Genre: Country
- Length: 42:57
- Label: Columbia Nashville
- Producer: Chris Farren (all tracks); Jake Mitchell (all tracks except 5 and 13); Mickey Jack Cones (tracks 5 and 13)

Singles from Bet You're from a Small Town
- 1. "Some Girls" Released: June 3, 2019; 2. "Cold Beer Calling My Name" Released: December 7, 2020; 3. "Missing One" Released: November 15, 2021

Bet You're from a Small Town is the debut studio album by American country music singer Jameson Rodgers. It was released on September 17, 2021 via Columbia Nashville. The album contains the number-one singles "Some Girls" and "Cold Beer Calling My Name", the latter of which features Luke Combs.

== Track listing ==
Bet You're from a Small Town track listing
No.	Title	Writer(s)	Length
1.	"One Day"	Jameson Rodgers; Smith Ahnquist; Will Bundy; Lynn Hutton	3:50
2.	"Merle Haggard"	Rodgers; Hutton; Jake Mitchell	3:31
3.	"Close to Anything"	Rodgers; Brent Anderson; Mitchell; Hunter Phelps	2:57
4.	"Bet You're from a Small Town"	Rodgers; Ahnquist; Bundy; Hutton	5:04
5.	"Missing One"	Rodgers; Ahnquist; Phelps	3:24
6.	"You Won't"	Rodgers; Ahnquist; Bundy; Hutton	2:55
7.	"Girl with the Broken Heart"	Rodgers; Michael Hardy; Mitchell	3:20
8.	"Bars Back Home"	Rodgers; Anderson; Mitchell; Phelps	3:18
9.	"Porch with a View"	Rodgers; Anderson; Mitchell; Phelps	2:43
10.	"Bringing It Back"	Rodgers; Mitchell	4:04
11.	"Girls That Smoke"	Rodgers; Ahnquist; Anderson	3:36
12.	"Cold Beer Calling My Name" (featuring Luke Combs)	Rodgers; Phelps; Brett Tyler; Alysa Vanderheym	3:31
13.	"Some Girls"	Hardy; CJ Solar; Mitchell	3:06
14.	"Good Dogs"	Rodgers; Anderson; Mitchell; Phelps	3:19
15.	"Desert"	Rodgers; Ahnquist; Josh Miller; Mitchell	3:19
Total length:			42:57

== Content ==
Co-writing 14 of the album's 15 tracks, the newlywed singer explores themes of love, loss, small towns, and drinking beer, but manages to cover each of those tropes in a way that is new and unique.

== Charts ==
Chart performance for Bet You're from a Small Town
Chart (2021)	Peak position
US Top Country Albums (Billboard)	42
US Billboard 200	182
