= Without You (Luke Combs song) =

2020 single by Luke Combs featuring Amanda Shires

Promotional single by Luke Combs featuring Amanda Shires

from the album What You See Ain't Always What You Get
- Released: September 18, 2020
- Genre: Country
- Length: 3:45
- Label: Columbia Nashville; River House
- Songwriter: Luke Combs
- Producers: Luke Combs; Chip Matthews; Jonathan Singleton

"Without You" is a song by American country music singer Luke Combs featuring American singer-songwriter Amanda Shires on fiddle. It was released in September 2020 as a promotional single from the deluxe edition of Combs' second studio album What You See Is What You Get, titled What You See Ain't Always What You Get.

== Background ==
Lyrically, the song is described as a "stirring ode to the people who have shaped [Combs] into the man he is today". Combs stated "The song is intended to be a thank you to my parents, beautiful wife, Nicole, and my fans. I'm truly a lucky guy. Then having the extremely talented Amanda Shires contribute her beautiful artistry on fiddle took the song to that next level".

Having previously collaborated with Combs when she played fiddle for him during a performance of "Beautiful Crazy" at the 54th Academy of Country Music Awards, Shires explained in an interview with Rolling Stone Country that "[Combs] is just a really cool guy and he said, 'I would love it if you would come play on this.' And I said, 'OK,'. Then we were hanging out playing. I went into the studio alone, because of Covid, with my mask and my gloves, and I put down those fiddle parts. I really, really like how that track came out". She also noted Combs' decision to officially feature her on the single despite not having a vocal part, saying "it's neat that he would come to such a merit-based decision in the country world, where a lot of women aren't credited".

== Charts ==
Chart (2020)	Peak position
Global 200 (Billboard)	119
US Billboard Hot 100	70
US Hot Country Songs (Billboard)	15
US Rolling Stone Top 100	36

== Certifications ==
Certifications for "Without You"
Region	Certification	Certified units/sales
Australia (ARIA)	Gold	35,000^{‡}
United States (RIAA)	Gold	500,000^{‡}
^{‡} Sales+streaming figures based on certification alone.
