= Cold Beer Calling My Name =

Single by Jameson Rodgers featuring Luke Combs

from the album Bet You're from a Small Town
- Released: December 7, 2020
- Genre: Country
- Length: 3:30
- Label: Columbia Nashville; River House
- Songwriters: Jameson Rodgers; Alysa Vanderheym; Brett Tyler; Hunter Phelps
- Producers: Chris Farren; Jake Mitchell

Jameson Rodgers singles chronology
"Some Girls" (2020)	"Cold Beer Calling My Name" (2020)	"Missing One" (2021)

Luke Combs singles chronology
"Better Together" (2020)	"Cold Beer Calling My Name" (2020)	"Forever After All" (2021)

Music video
- "Cold Beer Calling My Name" on YouTube

"Cold Beer Calling My Name" is a song recorded by American country music singers Jameson Rodgers and Luke Combs. It was released on December 7, 2020, as the second single from Rodgers' debut studio album Bet You're from a Small Town. The song was co-written by Rodgers, along with Alysa Vanderheym, Brett Tyler, and Hunter Phelps, and produced by Chris Farren and Jake Mitchell.

== Background ==
Jameson Rodgers served as an opening act for Combs during the latter's 2019 "Beer Never Broke My Heart Tour", and learned a thing about instant country classics from Combs's stage.

Rodgers said in a statement: "It's a fun, easy song, and I thought it'd be cool to have someone on it and at the time I was out with Combs, I asked Luke if he'd like to sing on it – I know he's a cold beer drinker like myself – and luckily it worked out and I'm excited for everybody to hear it".

== Content ==
Joseph Hudak of Rolling Stone pointed out the song starting with some jagged guitars, like Jason Aldean's style, and Rodgers singing about driving fast into an endless night.

== Music video ==
The music video was released on February 10, 2021, directed by Dustin Haney. Rodgers and Combs play beer delivery drivers. When they get off of work, singer-songwriter Drew Parker calls them to invite them to a bonfire, and tells them to bring a six-pack of beer.

== Charts ==
=== Weekly charts ===
Weekly chart performance for "Cold Beer Calling My Name"
Chart (2020–2021)	Peak position
Australia Country Hot 50 (TMN)	7
Canada Hot 100 (Billboard)	61
Canada Country (Billboard)	6
US Billboard Hot 100	26
US Country Airplay (Billboard)	1
US Hot Country Songs (Billboard)	3

=== Year-end charts ===
Year-end chart performance for "Cold Beer Calling My Name"
Chart (2021)	Position
US Country Airplay (Billboard)	17
US Hot Country Songs (Billboard)	34

== Certifications ==
Certifications for "Cold Beer Calling My Name"
Region	Certification	Certified units/sales
Australia (ARIA)	Gold	35,000^{‡}
United States (RIAA)	2× Platinum	2,000,000^{‡}
^{‡} Sales+streaming figures based on certification alone.
