= Does to Me =

2020 single Luke Combs and Eric Church

Single by Luke Combs featuring Eric Church

from the album What You See Is What You Get
- Released: February 10, 2020
- Genre: Country; country rock
- Length: 3:43
- Label: Columbia Nashville
- Songwriters: Luke Combs; Ray Fulcher; Tyler Reeve
- Producer: Scott Moffatt

Luke Combs singles chronology
"Even Though I'm Leaving" (2019)	"Does to Me" (2020)	"Six Feet Apart" (2020)

Eric Church singles chronology
"Monsters" (2019)	"Does to Me" (2020)	"Stick That in Your Country Song" (2020)

"Does to Me" is a song by American country music singers Luke Combs and Eric Church. Co-written by Combs along with Ray Fulcher and Tyler Reeve, it was released on February 10, 2019 as the third single from Combs' second studio album What You See Is What You Get.

== History ==
Rolling Stone Country writer Joseph Hudak described the song as featuring "Opening with some clean slide guitar, the mid-tempo ballad calls to mind Bruce Springsteen's wall-of-sound style and progression, with Combs proclaiming his own blue-collar bona fides in the lyrics." Billy Dukes of Taste of Country wrote that "While not his tightest lyric, this song...hits the heart as quick as any of his previous seven No. 1 hits...Most satisfying might be the Gary Morse steel guitar that saturates the mix." Combs wrote the song with Ray Fulcher and Tyler Reeve, and chose to include Church as a duet partner because he thought it fit Church's artistic style along with his own.

== Music video ==
The music video was directed by Jon Small/Trey Fanjoy and premiered on CMT, GAC and Vevo in April 2020.

== Commercial performance ==
"Does to Me" has sold 22,000 copies in the United States as of March 2020.

== Charts ==
=== Weekly charts ===
Chart (2020)	Peak position
Canada Hot 100 (Billboard)	38
Canada Country (Billboard)	1
New Zealand Hot Singles (RMNZ)	38
US Billboard Hot 100	20
US Country Airplay (Billboard)	1
US Hot Country Songs (Billboard)	4
US Rolling Stone Top 100	86

=== Year-end charts ===
Chart (2020)	Position
US Billboard Hot 100	93
US Country Airplay (Billboard)	8
US Hot Country Songs (Billboard)	16

== Certifications ==
Region	Certification	Certified units/sales
Australia (ARIA)	Platinum	70,000^{‡}
Canada (Music Canada)	2× Platinum	160,000^{‡}
United States (RIAA)	3× Platinum	3,000,000^{‡}
^{‡} Sales+streaming figures based on certification alone.
