= Even Though I'm Leaving =

Single by Luke Combs

from the album What You See Is What You Get
- Released: September 9, 2019
- Genre: Country
- Length: 3:45
- Label: Columbia Nashville
- Songwriters: Luke Combs; Wyatt Durrette; Ray Fulcher
- Producer: Scott Moffatt

Luke Combs singles chronology
"Beer Never Broke My Heart" (2019)	"Even Though I'm Leaving" (2019)	"Does to Me" (2020)

"Even Though I'm Leaving" is a song recorded by American country music singer Luke Combs. It was released in September 2019 as the second single to his second studio album, What You See Is What You Get.

== Content ==
"Even Though I'm Leaving" is described as a "soft, mandolin-infused country song" and "stone-cold tear-jerker" by the blog Taste of Country. Co-written by Combs along with Wyatt Durrette and Ray Fulcher, the song features a dramatic interaction between a father and son. In three different scenarios, the son, who is the narrator, pleads his father not to leave him. In the first verse, the narrator is a child who is afraid of monsters under his bed, while the second features the son as a young adult going off to serve in the military, and the final verse features the son becoming emotional over his father's death. The song previously appeared on Combs's 2019 EP The Prequel.

== Commercial performance ==
"Even Though I'm Leaving" reached No. 1 on Billboard's Country Airplay chart on November 23, 2019, and stayed on top of the chart for three weeks. It then fell to No. 2 for the chart dated December 14, while Old Dominion's "One Man Band" overtook it at the top. It remained at No. 2 the following week, having been leapfrogged by Thomas Rhett's "Remember You Young" at the top before returning to No. 1 for two additional weeks starting with the chart dated December 28, making for a total of five non-consecutive weeks at No. 1. With this song, Combs also extended his record of first singles being consecutive No. 1s to seven on the Country Airplay chart. It also reached a peak of number 11 on the Billboard Hot 100, becoming Combs' first top 20 entry on the chart.

The song was certified 5× Platinum by the RIAA on October 6, 2025. It has sold 226,000 copies in the United States as of March 2020.

== Charts ==
=== Weekly charts ===
Chart (2019–2020)	Peak position
Canada Hot 100 (Billboard)	30
Canada Country (Billboard)	1
Scotland Singles (Official Charts)	89
US Billboard Hot 100	11
US Hot Country Songs (Billboard)	2
US Country Airplay (Billboard)	1
US Rolling Stone Top 100	15

=== Year-end charts ===
Chart (2019)	Position
US Country Airplay (Billboard)	58
US Hot Country Songs (Billboard)	38

Chart (2020)	Position
US Billboard Hot 100	85
US Country Airplay (Billboard)	19
US Hot Country Songs (Billboard)	18

== Certifications ==
Region	Certification	Certified units/sales
Australia (ARIA)	2× Platinum	140,000^{‡}
Canada (Music Canada)	2× Platinum	160,000^{‡}
New Zealand (RMNZ)	Platinum	30,000^{‡}
United States (RIAA)	5× Platinum	5,000,000^{‡}
^{‡} Sales+streaming figures based on certification alone.
