= Better Together (Luke Combs song) =

Single by Luke Combs

from the album What You See Is What You Get
- Released: October 12, 2020
- Genre: Country
- Length: 3:40
- Label: River House; Columbia Nashville
- Songwriters: Luke Combs; Dan Isbell; Randy Montana
- Producer: Scott Moffatt

Luke Combs singles chronology
| "Six Feet Apart" (2020) | "Better Together" (2020) | "Cold Beer Calling My Name" (2021) |

"Better Together" is a song by American country music singer Luke Combs. It was released on October 12, 2020 as the fifth single from his second studio album What You See Is What You Get. Combs wrote the song with Dan Isbell and Randy Montana.

== Content and history ==
Lyrically, the song features Combs "comparing himself and his lover to other necessary couplings." Billy Dukes of Taste of Country said of the song that "chose country touchstones that speak to who he is and — more importantly — who his fans are." Combs performed the song on October 15, 2020 on the telecast of the Billboard Music Awards. During the performance, he appeared in a suit and without his trademark baseball cap, and was accompanied solely by a piano player.

== Chart performance ==
=== Weekly charts ===
| Chart (2020–2021) | Peak position |
|---|---|
| Canada Hot 100 (Billboard) | 29 |
| Canada Country (Billboard) | 1 |
| Global 200 (Billboard) | 87 |
| US Billboard Hot 100 | 15 |
| US Country Airplay (Billboard) | 1 |
| US Hot Country Songs (Billboard) | 1 |

=== Year-end charts ===
| Chart (2020) | Position |
|---|---|
| US Hot Country Songs (Billboard) | 61 |

| Chart (2021) | Position |
|---|---|
| Canada (Canadian Hot 100) | 94 |
| US Billboard Hot 100 | 57 |
| US Country Airplay (Billboard) | 5 |
| US Hot Country Songs (Billboard) | 4 |

== Certifications ==
| Region | Certification | Certified units/sales |
|---|---|---|
| Australia (ARIA) | 2× Platinum | 140,000^{‡} |
| Canada (Music Canada) | 2× Platinum | 160,000^{‡} |
| New Zealand (RMNZ) | Platinum | 30,000^{‡} |
| United Kingdom (BPI) | Silver | 200,000^{‡} |
| United States (RIAA) | 5× Platinum | 5,000,000^{‡} |
^{‡} Sales+streaming figures based on certification alone.
