= Lovin' on You =

2020 single by Luke Combs

Single by Luke Combs

from the album What You See Is What You Get and the EP The Prequel
- Released: June 22, 2020
- Genre: Country
- Length: 3:15
- Label: River House; Columbia Nashville
- Songwriters: Luke Combs; Thomas Archer; Ray Fulcher; James McNair
- Producer: Scott Moffatt

Luke Combs singles chronology
| "Six Feet Apart" (2020) | "Lovin' on You" (2020) | "Better Together" (2020) |

"Lovin' on You" is a song recorded by American country music singer Luke Combs. It was released in June 2020 as the fourth single from his 2019 album What You See Is What You Get. Combs wrote the song with Thomas Archer, Ray Fulcher, and James McNair.

== Background ==
Prior to the album's release, the song appeared on Combs' 2019 EP The Prequel. The song is a honky-tonk, listing various contents that the narrator likes, including his own love interest. Taste of Country writer Billy Dukes said "Repeated choruses aside, this 125-word jam finds Combs listing things he enjoys a fair bit before stating his undying love for being in love with his woman...the list is filled with specific, colorful detail that paints the song and adds strokes to a broader portrait of Combs as an artist."

Combs performed the song on The Tonight Show Starring Jimmy Fallon in July 2020, via footage of him and his band at the Brentwood Skate Center.

== Charts ==
=== Weekly charts ===
| Chart (2020) | Peak position |
|---|---|
| Canada Hot 100 (Billboard) | 48 |
| Canada Country (Billboard) | 1 |
| Global 200 (Billboard) | 174 |
| US Billboard Hot 100 | 23 |
| US Country Airplay (Billboard) | 1 |
| US Hot Country Songs (Billboard) | 3 |
| US Rolling Stone Top 100 | 52 |

=== Year-end charts ===
| Chart (2020) | Position |
|---|---|
| US Billboard Hot 100 | 97 |
| US Country Airplay (Billboard) | 9 |
| US Hot Country Songs (Billboard) | 19 |

== Certifications ==
| Region | Certification | Certified units/sales |
|---|---|---|
| Australia (ARIA) | Platinum | 70,000^{‡} |
| Canada (Music Canada) | 2× Platinum | 160,000^{‡} |
| New Zealand (RMNZ) | Gold | 15,000^{‡} |
| United States (RIAA) | 3× Platinum | 3,000,000^{‡} |
^{‡} Sales+streaming figures based on certification alone.
