= Jameson Rodgers =

American country musician

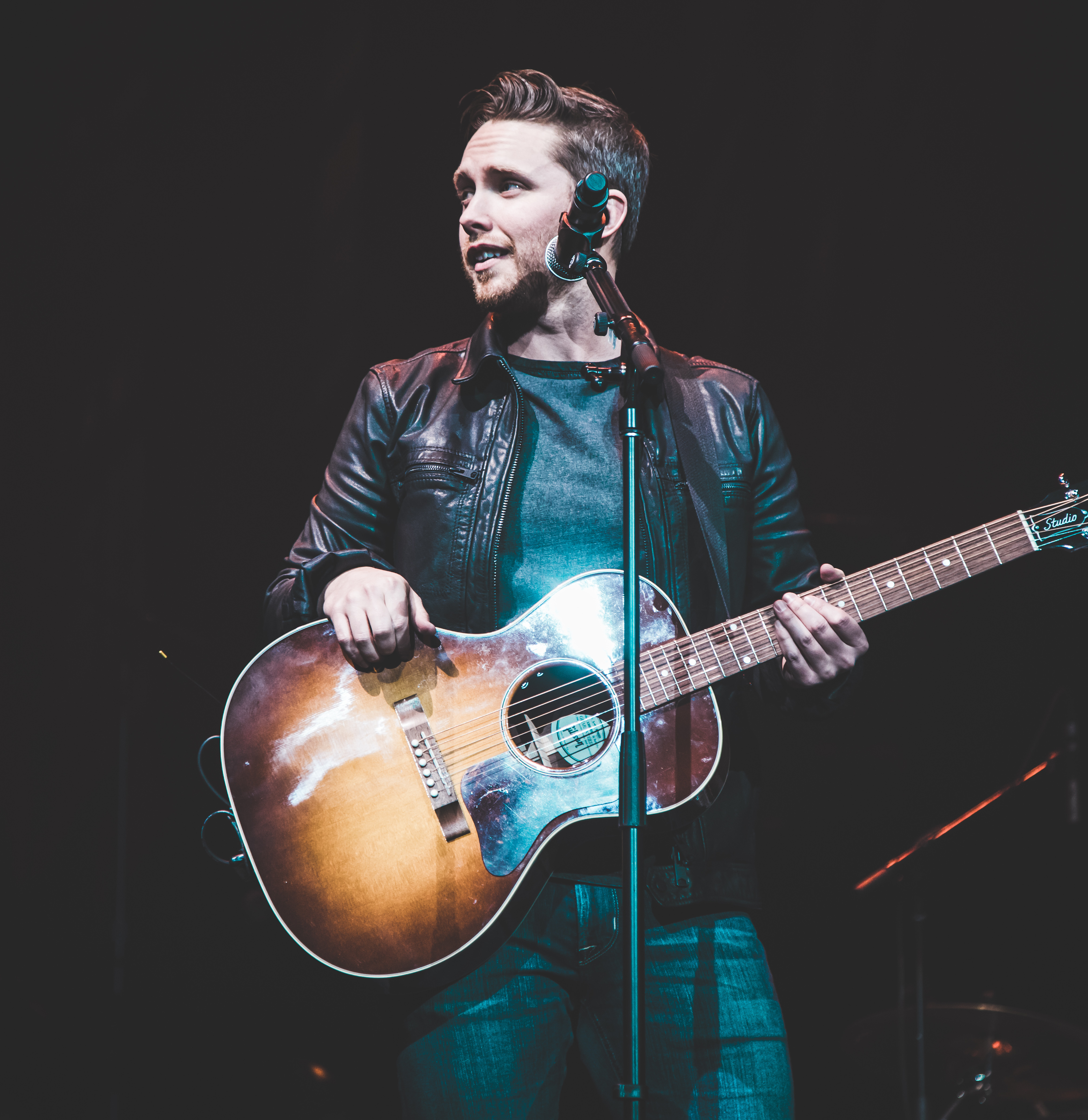

Background information
- Born: October 17, 1987 (age 38); Batesville, Mississippi, United States
- Genres: Country
- Occupations: Singer; songwriter
- Instruments: Vocals; guitar
- Years active: 2010–present
- Labels: Columbia Nashville; River House
- Website: www.jamesonrodgers.com

Jameson Rodgers (born October 17, 1987) is an American country music singer and songwriter signed to Columbia Nashville and River House, whose debut single "Some Girls" charted on the Country Airplay chart.

== Early life ==
Jameson Rodgers grew up in Batesville, Mississippi, United States. Rodgers loved baseball and music and played baseball at Northwest MS Community College before finishing college at University of Southern Mississippi. Rodgers started to write songs and perform, eventually developing a local following along the way. He later moved to Nashville in 2010 with his friend and never left.

== Career ==
In 2014, Rodgers received The ASCAP Foundation Leon Brettler Award and landed a publishing deal with Combustion Music. In 2016, he released his first EP and two years later, a self-titled EP in 2018, which featured the hit "Some Girls". The song was featured on SiriusXM's The Highway and has over 80 million streams. Rodgers has co-penned Platinum-selling hits for Florida Georgia Line (top 10 single "Talk You Out of It") and Chris Lane (No. 1 hit "I Don't Know About You"), along with "Camouflage Hat" on Jason Aldean's 2019 album 9 and the title track of Luke Bryan's 2020 album Born Here Live Here Die Here. Jameson won the 2020 MusicRow Discovery Artist of the Year award. Rodgers spent 2019 supporting Luke Combs on his "Beer Never Broke My Heart Tour", playing more than 60 arenas across the US and Canada.

Pandora Radio named Jameson Rodgers one of 2018 Country Artists to Watch.

In 2019, Rodgers signed a recording deal with River House Artists and Columbia Nashville.

In 2020, he achieved his first charting song on the Billboard charts; his debut hit "Some Girls" reached number one on the Country Airplay chart and number 29 on the Billboard Hot 100.

== Discography ==
=== Albums ===
- Bet You're from a Small Town (2021) – No. 182 US Billboard 200, No. 23 US Top Country Albums

=== EPs ===
- Jameson Rodgers EP (Independent, 2016)
- Jameson Rodgers (Independent, 2018) – No. 42 US Top Country Albums
- In It for the Money (River House and Columbia Nashville, 2021) – No. 41 US Top Country Albums

=== Singles ===
Year	Single	Peak positions						Album
Year	Single	US	US Country	US Country Airplay	CAN	CAN Country	Certifications	Album
2019	"Some Girls"	29	5	1	49	3	• RIAA: Platinum	Bet You're from a Small Town
2020	"Cold Beer Calling My Name" (featuring Luke Combs)	26	3	1	61	7		Bet You're from a Small Town
2021	"Missing One"	—	—	51	—	—		Bet You're from a Small Town
