= Six Feet Apart =

Promotional single by Luke Combs

from the album What You See Ain't Always What You Get
- Released: 2020
- Genre: Country
- Length: 3:19
- Label: Columbia Nashville; River House
- Songwriters: Luke Combs; Brent Cobb; Rob Snyder
- Producers: Luke Combs; Chip Matthews

Luke Combs singles chronology
"Does to Me" (2020)	"Six Feet Apart" (2020)	"Lovin' on You" (2020)

"Six Feet Apart" is a song recorded by American country music singer Luke Combs. It was released on May 1, 2020, as a direct response to the COVID-19 pandemic and was added to the digital version of his second album, What You See Is What You Get. It was also later added to the deluxe version of the album, What You See Ain't Always What You Get. Combs wrote the song with Brent Cobb and Rob Snyder.

== Content ==
Before the pandemic had hit, Combs was scheduled to meet with songwriters Brent Cobb and Rob Snyder on April 14 for a writing session. Combs said that all three of them had wanted to write a song about the COVID-19 pandemic but he was initially apprehensive because he thought the concept would be "too cheesy". Combs uploaded an acoustic version of the song to YouTube. After the video trended on that site, he performed it on the Grand Ole Opry. Combs then recorded a studio version and noted that during the recording session, everyone involved wore masks and was in a different room. The studio version of the song was officially sent to country radio on May 1, 2020. The song has a theme of missing major activities due to the pandemic, such as the arrival of the spring season and touring as a musician.

== Charts ==
=== Weekly charts ===
Chart (2020)	Peak position
Australia (ARIA)	77
Canada Hot 100 (Billboard)	36
Canada Country (Billboard)	19
US Billboard Hot 100	58
US Country Airplay (Billboard)	36
US Hot Country Songs (Billboard)	10

=== Year-end charts ===
Chart (2020)	Position
US Hot Country Songs (Billboard)	71

== Certifications ==
Region	Certification	Certified units/sales
Australia (ARIA)	Platinum	70,000^{‡}
Canada (Music Canada)	Platinum	80,000^{‡}
United States (RIAA)	Platinum	1,000,000^{‡}
^{‡} Sales+streaming figures based on certification alone.
