= My Boy (Elvie Shane song) =

2020 single by Elvie Shane

Single by Elvie Shane

from the album Backslider
- Released: September 21, 2020
- Genre: Country
- Length: 3:26
- Label: Wheelhouse
- Songwriters: Elvie Shane; Lee Starr; Nick Columbia; Russell Sutton
- Producer: Oscar Charles

Elvie Shane singles chronology
"My Boy" (2020)	"County Roads" (2022)

Music video
- "My Boy" on YouTube

"My Boy" is the debut single by American country music singer Elvie Shane. It was released to country radio on September 21, 2020. It is the first single from his debut album Backslider, which was released on October 29, 2021. Shane wrote the song with Lee Starr, Nick Columbia, and Russell Sutton, while Oscar Charles produced it. The single went platinum in 2022.

== Background ==
Shane wrote "My Boy" in 2016. It was "inspired by a Facebook post" sent to him that read "I don't have a step-son, I have a son that was born before I met him". Shane said: "I took that to a few of my friends, and I resonated with that being a step father myself, and 3 out of the 4 of us that wrote it could identify with the song somehow." On June 15, 2022, the Recording Industry Association of America certified the song platinum.

== Content ==
"My Boy" is a ballad about the role of a stepfather and the love for his son.

== Music video ==
The music video premiered on December 18, 2020, directed by Peter Zavadil. Shane plays a background character (the car mechanic) who is working alongside a truck driver. He has a strong bond with and love for his stepson. Shane is also seen as a character sitting in the bleachers at the kid's ballgame.

== Charts ==
=== Weekly charts ===
Weekly chart performance for "My Boy"
Chart (2020–2021)	Peak position
Canada Country (Billboard)	29
US Billboard Hot 100	28
US Country Airplay (Billboard)	1
US Hot Country Songs (Billboard)	4

=== Year-end charts ===
Year-end chart performance for "My Boy"
Chart (2021)	Position
US Country Airplay (Billboard)	20
US Hot Country Songs (Billboard)	28

== Certifications ==
Region	Certification	Certified units/sales
United States (RIAA)	Platinum	1,000,000^{‡}
^{‡} Sales+streaming figures based on certification alone.
