= Some Girls (Jameson Rodgers song) =

Single by Jameson Rodgers

from the album Bet You're from a Small Town
- Released: September 8, 2017
- Genre: Country
- Length: 3:06
- Label: River House; Columbia Nashville
- Songwriters: Michael Hardy; Jake Mitchell; CJ Solar
- Producers: Chris Farren; Mickey Jack Cones

Jameson Rodgers singles chronology
"Some Girls" (2017)	"Cold Beer Calling My Name" (2020)

"Some Girls" is a song written by Michael Hardy, CJ Solar, and Jake Mitchell, and recorded by American country music singer Jameson Rodgers. It was released on September 8, 2017, as Rodgers' debut single, and lead single from both his second self-titled EP (2018) and debut studio album Bet You're from a Small Town (2021). It was sent to country radio on June 3, 2019, and went on to top the Billboard Country Airplay chart on the week of October 31, 2020.

== Content ==
Rodgers originally included "Some Girls" in 2018 on a self-titled independent EP prior to signing with Columbia Records Nashville and River House Entertainment. Hardy wrote the song with Jake Mitchell and CJ Solar. The three writers had originally conceived the song as a demo before any of them had any success as songwriters. When no other artist recorded the song, Rodgers chose to record it himself.

Billy Dukes of Taste of Country wrote that the song is a "made-for-mainstream single that packs the words in heavy early on, but then relies on the repeated chorus to get to the end".

== Charts ==
=== Weekly charts ===
Chart (2019–2020)	Peak position
Canada Hot 100 (Billboard)	49
Canada Country (Billboard)	3
US Billboard Hot 100	29
US Country Airplay (Billboard)	1
US Hot Country Songs (Billboard)	5

=== Year-end charts ===
Chart (2020)	Position
US Country Airplay (Billboard)	17
US Hot Country Songs (Billboard)	29

== Certifications ==
Region	Certification	Certified units/sales
Canada (Music Canada)	Gold	40,000^{‡}
United States (RIAA)	Platinum	1,000,000^{‡}
^{‡} Sales+streaming figures based on certification alone.
