= Elvie Shane =

American country music singer

- Born: May 22, 1988 (age 37); Caneyville, Kentucky, U.S.
- Origin: Nashville, Tennessee, U.S.
- Genres: Country
- Occupation: Singer-songwriter
- Instruments: Vocals, guitar
- Years active: 2020-present
- Labels: Wheelhouse

Elvie Shane (born May 22, 1988) is an American country music singer. He is signed to BBR Music Group and in 2020 he released his debut single "My Boy", which has charted on Country Airplay.

Shane was born in Caneyville, Kentucky, where he grew up singing in his church and listening to country music that his father played. After attending Western Kentucky University, he dropped out of college to focus on music. He began performing publicly in 2012, which led to him competing on American Idol in 2016. Although he was eliminated early in the Hollywood rounds, he released multiple songs online including "County Roads" and "My Boy". In 2020, he was signed to Wheelhouse, which released "My Boy" to country radio.

Shane wrote the song with Russell Sutton, Lee Starr, and Nick Columbia. In December 2020, he released a music video which was directed by Peter Zavadil. "My Boy" also made the Country Airplay charts, reaching the top 10 of the chart in September 2021.

== Discography ==
=== Albums ===
Title	Album details
Backslider	Release date: October 29, 2021 (Note: Backslider was released on October 29, 2021 exclusively for digital download/streaming. It was released to CD on February 11, 2022.); Label: Wheelhouse; Formats: CD, digital download, streaming
Damascus	Release: April 19, 2024; Label: Wheelhouse; Format: Digital download, streaming

=== Extended plays ===
Title	EP details
County Roads	Release date: April 23, 2021; Label: Wheelhouse; Formats: Digital download, streaming

=== Singles ===
List of singles, with selected chart positions
Title	Year	Peak positions			Certifications	Album
Title	Year	US	US Country	US Country Airplay	Certifications	Album
"My Boy"	2020	28	4	1	RIAA: Platinum	Backslider
"County Roads"	2022	—	—	60		Backslider
