= Forever After All =

2020 song by Luke Combs

Single by Luke Combs

from the album What You See Is What You Get
- Written: January 2019
- Released: March 1, 2021; March 8, 2021 (country radio release)
- Genre: Country
- Length: 3:52
- Label: River House; Columbia Nashville
- Songwriters: Luke Combs; Rob Williford; Drew Parker
- Producers: Luke Combs; Chip Matthews; Jonathan Singleton

Luke Combs singles chronology
"Cold Beer Calling My Name" (2020)	"Forever After All" (2021)	"Cold as You" (2021)

Audio video
- "Forever After All" on YouTube

Acoustic version
- "Forever After All" on YouTube

"Forever After All" is a song by American country music singer Luke Combs, It was released on March 1, 2021, as part of What You See Ain't Always What You Get, the deluxe edition of his second studio album, What You See Is What You Get. Following its release, the song broke Apple Music and Spotify's streaming records for a country song.

Commercially, the song debuted at number two on the US Billboard Hot 100, behind Ariana Grande's "Positions", and number one on the Hot Country Songs chart for the week ending November 7, 2020. This single, along with his cover of "Fast Car", is his highest charting song to date on the Hot 100.

== Background and writing ==
"Forever After All" was the first song Combs wrote after he and his wife, Nicole, moved into their house in Tennessee. It was written in January 2019, and was further co-written by Combs' frequent collaborators, Rob Williford and Drew Parker. This was beneficial to Combs as he found it "easier to open up with guys that you've written with a lot". The song was first previewed by Combs on August 27, 2020, on the video-sharing app TikTok. He later shared a video on Instagram featuring some of the lyrics. Combs recalled, "once we teased the song, people's reaction was really awesome. I don't think we expected it to be that big". He said they were "trying to hold [the song] back for a long time and not play it". The song is a continuance of "Beautiful Crazy" and "Better Together", which were both dedicated to his wife, whom he married in August 2020. He stated, "You could write a generic love song, and not to say it couldn't be done, but my wife's impact on my life has weighed heavily on the outcome of these songs".

== Composition ==
"Forever After All" is a "tender", "romantic" midtempo country love song. It sees Combs harmonizing about his wife's unique attributes, and how, unlike material things, their love will "last forever after all". The ballad reflects on how love is everlasting, even through death.

== Live performances ==
On the day of the song's release, Combs, accompanied with a full band, performed it on Facebook Live along with the rest of the songs on the deluxe album. The performance benefited the MusiCares foundation.

== Commercial performance ==
"Forever After All" set the record for the biggest first day streams for a country song on Apple Music, reaching number one on the platform's global chart. It also earned the most first day streams for a country song by a solo artist on Spotify. The song debuted at number one on the Hot Country Songs chart and number two on the Billboard Hot 100 chart.

"Forever After All" reached number one on the Billboard Country Airplay chart dated June 5, 2021, making Combs the second artist to score six number one singles from a single album, and tying Luke Bryan for the most from an album.

== Charts ==
=== Weekly charts ===
Weekly chart performance for "Forever After All"
Chart (2020–2021)	Peak position
Australia (ARIA)	14
Australia Country Hot 50 (TMN)	3
Canada Hot 100 (Billboard)	3
Canada Country (Billboard)	1
Global 200 (Billboard)	4
Ireland (IRMA)	36
New Zealand Hot Singles (RMNZ)	4
Scottish Singles Sales (Official Charts)	11
US Billboard Hot 100	2
US Country Airplay (Billboard)	1
US Hot Country Songs (Billboard)	1
US Rolling Stone Top 100	1

=== Year-end charts ===
2020 year-end chart performance for "Forever After All"
Chart (2020)	Position
US Hot Country Songs (Billboard)	85

2021 year-end chart performance for "Forever After All"
Chart (2021)	Position
Global 200 (Billboard)	116
US Billboard Hot 100	18
US Country Airplay (Billboard)	2
US Hot Country Songs (Billboard)	1

== Certifications ==
Certifications for "Forever After All"
Region	Certification	Certified units/sales
Australia (ARIA)	3× Platinum	210,000^{‡}
Canada (Music Canada)	Platinum	80,000^{‡}
New Zealand (RMNZ)	Platinum	30,000^{‡}
United Kingdom (BPI)	Platinum	600,000^{‡}
United States (RIAA)	8× Platinum	8,000,000^{‡}
^{‡} Sales+streaming figures based on certification alone.
