= What You See Is What You Get (Luke Combs album) =

Studio album by Luke Combs
- Released: November 8, 2019
- Genre: Country
- Length: 63:02
- Labels: River House Artists; Columbia Nashville
- Producers: Luke Combs; Chip Matthews; Scott Moffatt; Jonathan Singleton

Luke Combs chronology
The Prequel (2019)	What You See Is What You Get (2019)	Growin' Up (2022)

Singles from What You See Is What You Get
- 1. "Beer Never Broke My Heart" Released: May 8, 2019; 2. "Even Though I'm Leaving" Released: September 9, 2019; 3. "Does to Me" Released: February 10, 2020; 4. "Lovin' on You" Released: June 22, 2020; 5. "Better Together" Released: October 12, 2020; 6. "Forever After All" Released: March 1, 2021; 7. "Cold as You" Released: July 19, 2021

Professional ratings
Aggregate scores
Source	Rating
Metacritic	74/100
Review scores
Source	Rating
AllMusic	4/5 stars
Exclaim!	9/10
Rolling Stone	3.5/5 stars

What You See Is What You Get is the second studio album by American country music artist Luke Combs. It was released on November 8, 2019 through River House Artists and Columbia Nashville. It includes all five songs previously featured on the 2019 EP The Prequel, including the singles "Beer Never Broke My Heart" and "Even Though I'm Leaving" in addition to the track "1, 2 Many" (a collaboration with Brooks & Dunn), the single "Does to Me", and later the promotional single "Six Feet Apart".

Combs toured North America throughout the remainder of 2019 and was to headline the C2C: Country to Country festival in Europe in 2020 in promotion of the album, however the festival was canceled due to the COVID-19 pandemic. Seven singles from the album, "Beer Never Broke My Heart", "Even Though I'm Leaving", "Does to Me", "Lovin' on You", "Better Together", "Forever After All" and "Cold as You", reached number one on the Billboard Country Airplay chart. It became his first album to reach number one in the Canada, Australia and United States.

== Background ==
Combs said his intention with new track "1, 2 Many" was to "write a song that I felt like my '90s country music heroes would be proud of". It marks his second collaboration with Brooks & Dunn, with his first being a cover of their debut single "Brand New Man" on their album Reboot.

"Six Feet Apart", a standalone song released on May 1, 2020 in response to the COVID-19 pandemic, was later added to the end of the album's digital and streaming editions.

On August 20, Combs announced that the album will be re-released as a deluxe album titled What You See Ain't Always What You Get on October 23, 2020, featuring "Six Feet Apart", as well as five new songs. The first of the new songs "Without You" was released as a promotional single on September 18.

== Commercial performance ==
What You See Is What You Get debuted atop the US Billboard 200 on the chart dated November 23, 2019, earning 172,000 album-equivalent units, including 109,000 pure album sales. In addition to becoming Combs' first US number-one album, it opened with the "largest week for a country album" since 2018, and became the biggest week in terms of streams for a country album on record. The album has sold 350,000 copies in the United States as of March 2020, with 5,000,000 units consumed in total. After its reissue, on the chart dated November 7, 2020, the album returned to the top spot from number 21, selling 109,000 album-equivalent units. In the same week, the album broke the record for the most streams for a country record at 102.26 million streams. At 11 months and 15 days, What You See Is What You Get also became the first album since Bon Jovi's This House Is Not for Sale to return to number one after an extended wait. It was among the top 10 albums of 2020, with 1.475 million equivalent album unit consumed (184,000 in pure sales) that year.

The album also topped the ARIA Albums Chart in Australia, becoming Combs's first number-one album there.

== Track listing ==
All tracks are written by Luke Combs, with additional co-writers as noted.

What You See Is What You Get track listing
No.	Title	Writer(s)	Length
1.	"Beer Never Broke My Heart"	Randy Montana; Jonathan Singleton	3:07
2.	"Refrigerator Door"	Jordan Brooker	3:24
3.	"Even Though I'm Leaving"	Wyatt Durrette; Ray Fulcher	3:45
4.	"Lovin' on You"	Thomas Archer; Fulcher; James McNair	3:15
5.	"Moon Over Mexico"	Fulcher; Dan Isbell; Singleton	3:25
6.	"1, 2 Many" (featuring Brooks & Dunn)	Isbell; Drew Parker; Tyler King	3:01
7.	"Blue Collar Boys"	Erik Dylan; Fulcher; Derrick Moody	3:40
8.	"New Every Day"	Fulcher; Josh Thompson	3:19
9.	"Reasons"	Fulcher; McNair	3:44
10.	"Every Little Bit Helps"	Chase McGill; McNair	4:08
11.	"Dear Today"	Dylan; Rob Snyder	3:40
12.	"What You See Is What You Get"	Barry Dean; Singleton	2:52
13.	"Does to Me" (featuring Eric Church)	Fulcher; Tyler Reeve	3:43
14.	"Angels Workin' Overtime"	Josh Phillips; Thompson	4:14
15.	"All Over Again"	Corey Crowder; Fulcher	3:29
16.	"Nothing Like You"	Parker; Robert Williford	3:16
17.	"Better Together"	Isbell; Montana	3:40
Total length:			59:42

All tracks are written by Luke Combs, with additional co-writers as needed.

What You See Ain't Always What You Get (Disc Two tracks on physical version)
No.	Title	Writer(s)	Length
18.	"Six Feet Apart"	Brent Cobb; Snyder	3:20
19.	"Cold as You"	Shane Minor; Montana; Singleton	3:06
20.	"The Other Guy"	Williford; Brandon Kinney	3:10
21.	"My Kinda Folk"	Fulcher; Isbell; Jamie Davis; Dustin Nunley	4:27
22.	"Without You" (featuring Amanda Shires)	Durrette; Isbell	3:44
23.	"Forever After All"	Williford; Parker	3:52
Total length:			80:01

== Personnel ==
From What You See Is What You Get liner notes.

Musicians

- Luke Combs – lead and background vocals
- Brooks & Dunn – vocals on "1, 2 Many"
- Eric Church – vocals on "Does to Me"
- Dave Cohen – piano, organ, synthesizer
- Jon Conley – electric guitar, acoustic guitar, banjo
- Doug Frasure – drums
- Aubrey Haynie – fiddle
- Wil Houchens – piano, organ, synthesizer
- Ben Jordan – bass guitar
- Buddy Leach – saxophone
- Tim Marks – bass guitar
- Carl Miner – acoustic guitar, banjo, mandolin
- Scott Moffatt – background vocals, electric guitar, acoustic guitar, banjo, synthesizer, percussion, glockenspiel, clapping, programming
- Gary Morse – pedal steel guitar, lap steel guitar
- Sol Philcox-Littlefield – electric guitar, slide guitar
- Jerry Roe – drums
- Jimmie Lee Sloas – bass guitar
- Ilya Toshinsky – acoustic guitar, mandolin

Technical

- Luke Armentrout – mastering assistant
- Nick Autry – engineering of Brooks & Dunn's vocals on "1, 2 Many"
- Taylor Chadwick – mastering assistant
- Jim Cooley – mixing (1–5, 7, 8–10, 12, 13, 15, 16)
- Andrew Darby – mastering assistant
- Dan Davis – engineering assistant
- Bobbi Giel – mastering assistant
- Mike Gillies – digital editing
- Alex Gilson – engineering
- Rob Hendon – cover artist
- Travis Humbert – session cleanup
- Mike Kyle – engineering of Brooks & Dunn's vocals on "1, 2 Many"
- Kam Luchterhand – engineering assistant
- Andrew Mendelson – mastering
- Scott Moffatt – producer; mixing (6, 7, 14, 16, 17)
- Seth Morton – engineering assistant
- Jason Mott – engineering assistant
- Allen Parker – engineering of Eric Church's vocals on "Does to Me"
- Megan Peterson – mastering assistant
- Joey Stanca – engineering assistant
- Preston White – engineering assistant

=== What You See Ain't Always What You Get credits ===
From What You See Ain't Always What You Get (18-23) liner notes.

Musicians

- Luke Combs – lead vocals
- Jim "Moose" Brown – organ, piano
- Perry Coleman – background vocals
- Jon Conley – acoustic guitar, mandolin, banjo
- Wes Hightower – background vocals
- Steve Mackey – bass guitar
- Chip Matthews – acoustic guitar, electric guitar, baritone guitar, programming, background vocals
- Rob McNelley – electric guitar
- Gary Morse – pedal steel guitar
- Sol Philcox-Littlefield – electric guitar
- Danny Rader – acoustic guitar, electric guitar, mandolin
- Jerry Roe – drums, percussion
- Amanda Shires – fiddle on "Without You"
- Jonathan Singleton – electric guitar, resonator guitar, bouzouki, background vocals
- Russell Terrell – background vocals

Technical

- Spencer Clark – recording assistant on "Six Feet Apart"
- Luke Combs – producer
- Jim Cooley – mixing (19, 21)
- Justin Francis – recording assistant (19-23)
- Ted Jensen – mastering
- Scott Johnson – production assistance
- Chip Matthews – producer, recording, additional recording, digital editing, mixing (18, 20, 22, 23)
- Jonathan Singleton – producer (19-23)

== Charts ==
=== Weekly charts ===
Weekly chart performance for What You See Is What You Get
Chart (2019–2026)	Peak position
Australian Albums (ARIA)	1
Canadian Albums (Billboard)	1
Irish Albums (Official Charts)	21
New Zealand Albums (RMNZ)	22
Scottish Albums (Official Charts)	10
Swiss Albums (Schweizer Hitparade)	96
UK Albums (Official Charts)	27
UK Country Albums (Official Charts)	1
US Billboard 200	1
US Top Country Albums (Billboard)	1

=== Year-end charts ===
Year-end chart performance for What You See Is What You Get
Chart (2019)	Position
Australian Albums (ARIA)	62
Chart (2020)	Position
Australian Albums (ARIA)	5
Canadian Albums (Billboard)	10
US Billboard 200	10
US Top Country Albums (Billboard)	1
Chart (2021)	Position
Australian Albums (ARIA)	14
Canadian Albums (Billboard)	8
US Billboard 200	7
US Top Country Albums (Billboard)	2
Chart (2022)	Position
Australian Albums (ARIA)	17
Canadian Albums (Billboard)	18
US Billboard 200	22
US Top Country Albums (Billboard)	3
Chart (2023)	Position
Australian Albums (ARIA)	24
Canadian Albums (Billboard)	20
US Billboard 200	44
US Top Country Albums (Billboard)	10
Chart (2024)	Position
Australian Albums (ARIA)	36
Australian Country Albums (ARIA)	5
Canadian Albums (Billboard)	44
US Billboard 200	70
US Top Country Albums (Billboard)	19
Chart (2025)	Position
Australian Albums (ARIA)	54
US Billboard 200	152
US Top Country Albums (Billboard)	28

== Certifications ==
Certifications for What You See Is What You Get
Region	Certification	Certified units/sales
Australia (ARIA) for What You See Ain't Always What You Get	2× Platinum	140,000^{‡}
Canada (Music Canada)	6× Platinum	480,000^{‡}
New Zealand (RMNZ)	Platinum	15,000^{‡}
Sweden (GLF) for What You See Ain't Always What You Get	Gold	15,000^{‡}
United Kingdom (BPI)	Gold	100,000^{‡}
United States (RIAA)	5× Platinum	5,000,000^{‡}
^{‡} Sales+streaming figures based on certification alone.
