= Beer Never Broke My Heart =

2019 single by Luke Combs

Single by Luke Combs

from the album What You See Is What You Get
- Released: May 8, 2019
- Genre: Country
- Length: 3:06
- Label: Columbia Nashville
- Songwriters: Luke Combs; Randy Montana; Jonathan Singleton
- Producer: Scott Moffatt

Luke Combs singles chronology
"Beautiful Crazy" (2018)	"Beer Never Broke My Heart" (2019)	"Even Though I'm Leaving" (2019)

"Beer Never Broke My Heart" is a song co-written and recorded by American country music singer Luke Combs. It is Combs's sixth single release to country radio, and the first from his second studio album What You See Is What You Get on Columbia Records Nashville.

== History and content ==
Combs wrote the song with Randy Montana and Jonathan Singleton, and Scott Moffatt was the track's producer. Combs first performed the song acoustically in concert in January 2018.

Taste of Country wrote of the song's lyrical theme, "He sings about everything else in life that can hurt a person, but ultimately comes to the conclusion that beer is the only safe bet!" The song features a list of various things and people that have disappointed the narrator in his life, before concluding in the chorus that "long-neck, ice-cold beer never broke my heart." The song features a guitar riff which was described as owing "as much to hard rock as country" by Rolling Stone reporter Robert Crawford.

== Commercial performance ==
"Beer Never Broke My Heart" peaked at No. 1 on Billboard's Country Airplay chart dated August 10, 2019, becoming Combs' sixth consecutive number one on the chart. The song was certified 8× Platinum by the RIAA on June 13, 2025. It has sold 321,000 copies in the United States as of March 2020.

== Critical reception ==
Stephen Thomas Erlewine, writing for AllMusic, described the song as "a clever drinking anthem that summarizes the bold undercurrents of The Prequel EP quite well." Rolling Stone reporter Robert Crawford described the song as "a country hit for the digital streaming generation, with just enough genre-crossing charm to rope in the city slickers", and the outlet ranked it #188 on its ranking of the 200 Greatest Country Songs of All Time on May 24, 2024.

== Music video ==
The music video was created by TA Films and premiered on CMT and Vevo in 2019. In the video, Combs performs in a small dive bar, similar to gigs he played early in his career. The video also depicts a high school football game between RS Central and East Rutherford, portrayed as a college football game, filmed at RS Central High in Rutherford County, North Carolina.

A 360-degree video was filmed for the song in Tacoma, Washington, and was released in December 2019. Country singer Megan Moroney appears briefly in the video as a bar extra; she later said she participated in the filming while she was still in college.

== Live performances and other versions ==
Combs performed the song on The Tonight Show Starring Jimmy Fallon in May 2019, the 2019 CMA Awards in November 2019, and on Saturday Night Live in February 2020.

== Charts ==
=== Weekly charts ===
Chart (2019–2020)	Peak position
Australia (ARIA)	44
Canada Hot 100 (Billboard)	31
Canada Country (Billboard)	1
Global 200 (Billboard)	184
US Billboard Hot 100	21
US Hot Country Songs (Billboard)	2
US Country Airplay (Billboard)	1
US Rolling Stone Top 100	21

=== Year-end charts ===
Chart (2019)	Position
Canada (Canadian Hot 100)	68
US Billboard Hot 100	63
US Country Airplay (Billboard)	5
US Hot Country Songs (Billboard)	5
US Rolling Stone Top 100	59

== Certifications ==
Region	Certification	Certified units/sales
Australia (ARIA)	5× Platinum	350,000^{‡}
Canada (Music Canada)	4× Platinum	320,000^{‡}
New Zealand (RMNZ)	Platinum	30,000^{‡}
United Kingdom (BPI)	Silver	200,000^{‡}
United States (RIAA)	8× Platinum	8,000,000^{‡}
^{‡} Sales+streaming figures based on certification alone.
