= Scott Moffatt =

Canadian musician (born 1983)

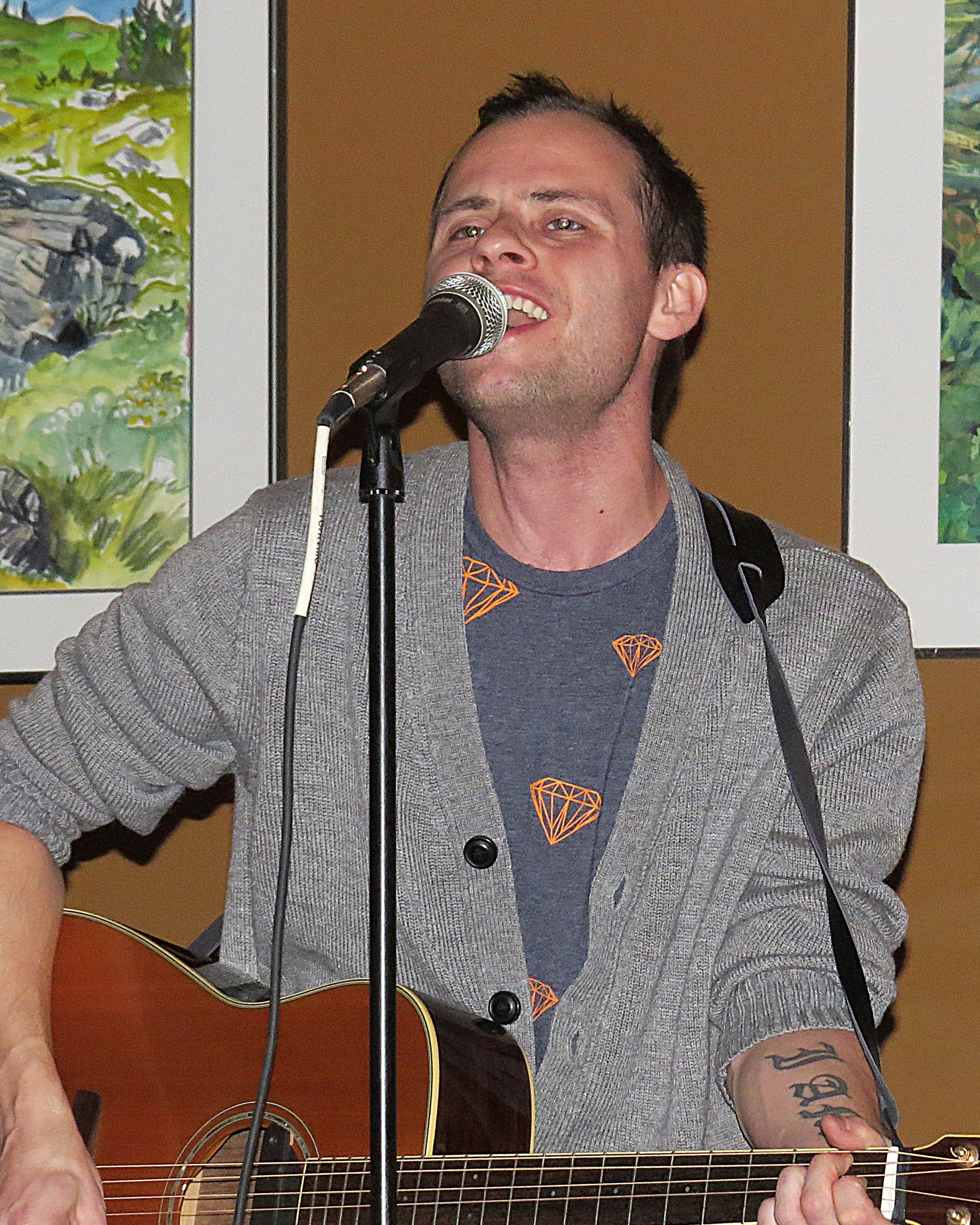
- Moffatt in 2014

Background information
- Born: Scott Andrew Moffatt; March 30, 1983 (age 43); Whitehorse, Yukon, Canada
- Occupations: Singer, musician, producer
- Instruments: Vocals, guitar
- Website: scottmoffatt.com

Scott Andrew Moffatt (born March 30, 1983) is a Canadian musician. He is the lead guitarist and vocalist for Canadian band the Moffatts, alongside his younger triplet brothers Clint, Bob, and Dave.

== Early life ==
Scott is the eldest child of Frank and Darlana Moffatt. His younger brothers, Clint, Bob, and Dave, were born a year after his birth. Clint and Bob are identical twins and Dave is a fraternal triplet. As a child, Scott modelled for a catalogue and bought his first guitar with his earnings at age six.

== Career ==
In 1993, the Moffatt Brothers released their first CD independently. They changed their stage name to the Moffatts and became the youngest band to sign a contract with a major label. As the boys grew up, they picked instruments and Scott's choice was the guitar. He did most of the lead vocals throughout their run.

A year later, in summer 2002, reports that Scott had joined a new band with two friends in Bragg Creek, Alberta began spreading. The line-up placed Scott on guitar once again, but later live shows would reveal that he also played organ and bass. They called themselves the Boston Post and released an EP entitled It's 99PM, in January 2003. After two tours, several other appearances including on Canadian national music television, MuchMusic, and awards from the Banff Centre for mixing of some of their songs, the band packed up their gear for good. Rumours had circulated before the last shows that the band wanted to become Scott Moffatt and band, which is how most media saw them.

Within a year after the Boston Post's last show, Scott formed a new band, this time with Clint and Bob called Music Travel Love. The only record of this project was two mentions in the Banff Centre's 2005 Newsletters, both stating that Shawn Everett, the drummer of the Boston Post and Scott's good friend, was working on producing and engineering 'The Moffats' (with one t) upcoming album and had won an award for mixing one song. Scott was always careful to not call anything the Moffatts unless all four of them were in fact involved. Nevertheless they were called by that name (though misspelled).

Bob then moved to Thailand, later followed by Clint, creating the Starz 2006 project and later their band Same Same. Scott then announced on his personal Myspace that he intended to go solo. He had relocated to Los Angeles after the Boston Post ended and he revealed that he was currently recording his debut album. He encouraged fans to send in samples of sounds they found interesting, or any unused instruments they could spare. He wanted to create an album aided by fans, and promised to thank all the contributors in the CD booklet. Several rose to the challenge and sent him everything from instruments to CDs with sounds on them and were thanked in later posts.

On April 10, 2006, he posted song previews from the long-awaited album on his Myspace page. The CD was named The Allegory of the City. The songs were acoustic and expressed a folk rock/pop vibe that retained the Scott Moffatt feel. He provided all instruments and vocals and he handled production and mixing.

=== Producer ===
He worked as a producer and broke the Thai band Slot Machine and won Producer of the Year at the 2007 Seed Awards. He won Producer of the Year in 2008 at the Thai Headbanger Awards for his work with Brand New Sunset. Other Thai acts Scott produced for included Mint, Getsunova, Daylight Saving, Apartment KhunPa, and American artist Cory Lamb.

Scott produced a Montreal-based band Roads. He also produced Spanish singer Iris Campo's 2015 EP, I'll Wait For You. He would later marry Campo.

Scott produced Luke Combs' first two albums This One's for You, which reached #1 on the Billboard Top Country Albums chart and number five on the US Billboard 200 in its first week. This One's for You spent 50 weeks at #1 on Top Country Albums, setting the record for the longest reign at the top of that chart by a male artist.

Scott produced Comb's second album What You See Is What You Get, which won Country Album of the Year at the 2020 iHeartRadio Music Awards.

Combs took home the award for album of the year at the 2020 ACM Awards for his LP What You See Is What You Get. At the 2020 CCMA's, the Record Producer of the Year was again Scott Moffatt.

=== Personal life ===
Scott Moffatt is married to Spanish-born singer Iris Campo, and they have two daughters.
