= 2022 CMT Music Awards =

Country music award ceremony

- Date: April 11, 2022
- Location: Nashville Municipal Auditorium, Nashville, Tennessee
- Hosted by: Kelsea Ballerini (virtually); Kane Brown; Anthony Mackie

Highlights
- Most wins: Jason Aldean; Cody Johnson; Carrie Underwood; (2 each)
- Most nominations: Kane Brown (4)

Television/radio coverage
- Network: CBS
- Viewership: 5.5 million

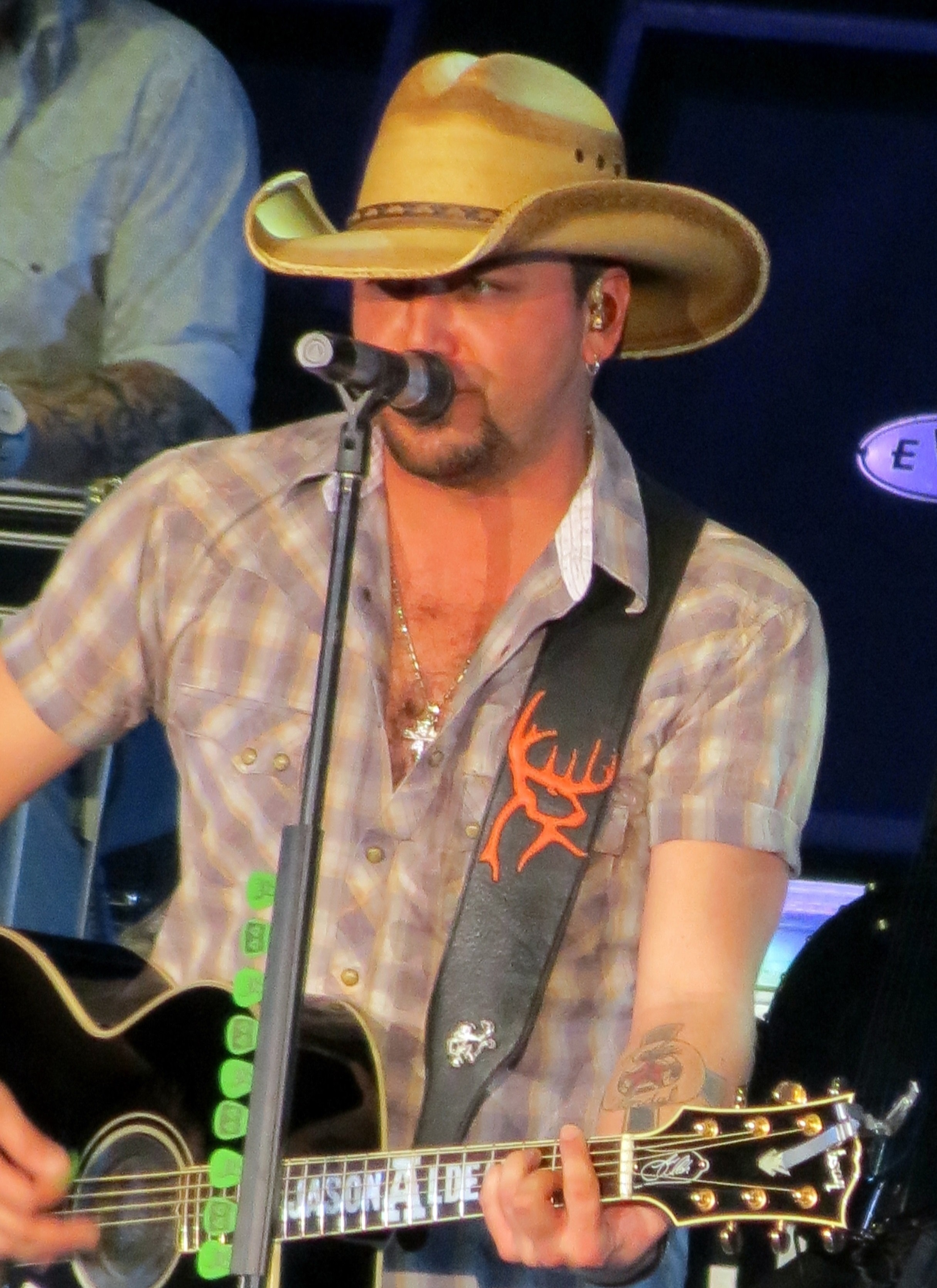
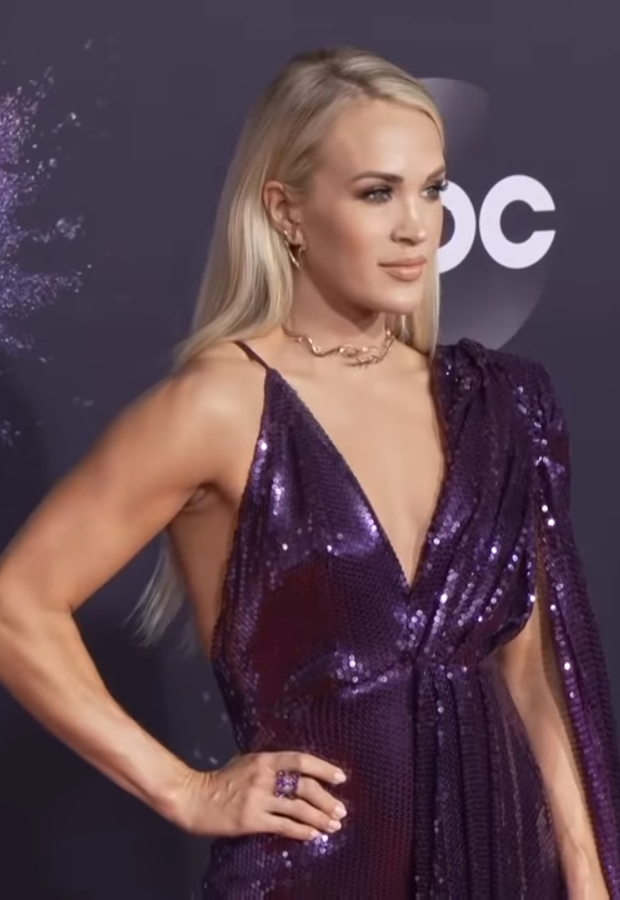
Jason Aldean and Carrie Underwood took home the award for Video of the Year.

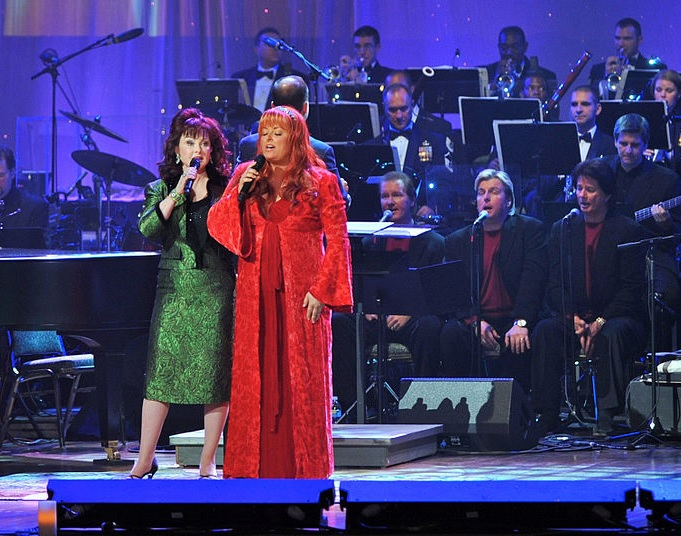
The Judds, performed for the final time together. Naomi Judd died on April 30.

The 2022 CMT Music Awards, the 56th edition of the awards ceremony, were held in Nashville, Tennessee on April 11, 2022, at the Nashville Municipal Auditorium and locations in and around Nashville, Tennessee. The ceremony was hosted by Kelsea Ballerini (virtually), Kane Brown, and Anthony Mackie. The ceremony marked the final appearance and public performance of the country music duo, The Judds, as Naomi Judd died on April 30.

== Background ==
The CMT Music Awards is country music's only entirely fan-voted awards show. Following the departure of the Academy of Country Music Awards from the network after 23 years, Paramount Global announced that the live televised ceremony would move from CMT to CBS. While CBS carried the award show live, CMT aired week-long special programming and events capped by an exclusive "director's cut" airing of the ceremony on the cable network.

=== Judds Reunion ===
On April 1, CMT announced that Wynonna and Naomi Judd would reunite for a performance on the 2022 CMT Music Awards. The reunion comes ahead of the duo's Country Music Hall of Fame induction in May and Final Tour in the Fall. They performed their hit song, "Love Can Build a Bridge," from the Country Music Hall of Fame in Nashville. The performance marked The Judds' only nationally televised award show performance in more than twenty years. The reunion performance was met with positive reception. People magazine called the performance "stunning", and Billboard called the reunion a "glorious return and a welcome comeback". This would be the final live performance for Naomi Judd and for The Judds as a duo; Naomi died on April 30, 2022, just nineteen days after their performance.

=== Ballerini tests positive for COVID-19 ===
On the day of the live telecast, Ballerini announced that she had tested positive for COVID-19. She was asymptomatic, and said she would be able to co-host and perform from her home, with help from CMT and CBS. Kane Brown, who hosted the previous year's ceremony with Ballerini, stepped in and shared the main stage with Mackie as a co-host.

== Winners and nominees ==
Nominees were announced on March 16, 2022. Winners are in bold.

Video of the Year	Female Video of the Year
**Jason Aldean** and **Carrie Underwood** — "**If I Didn't Love You**"; Cody Johnson — "'Til You Can't"; Kane Brown — "One Mississippi"	**Miranda Lambert** — "**If I Was a Cowboy**"; Brandi Carlile — "Right on Time"; Gabby Barrett — "Footprints on the Moon"; Kacey Musgraves — "Justified"; Maren Morris — "Circles Around This Town"; Mickey Guyton — "Remember Her Name"; Tenille Arts — "Back Then, Right Now"
Male Video of the Year	Duo/Group Video of the Year
**Cody Johnson** — "**'Til You Can't**"; Eric Church — "Heart on Fire"; Kane Brown — "One Mississippi"; Luke Bryan — "Waves"; Luke Combs — "Forever After All"; Thomas Rhett — "Country Again"; Walker Hayes — "Fancy Like"	**Maddie & Tae** — "**Woman You Got**"; Brothers Osborne — "I'm Not for Everyone"; Dan + Shay — "Steal My Love"; Old Dominion — "I Was on a Boat That Day"; Parmalee — "Take My Name"; Zac Brown Band — "Same Boat"
Breakthrough Video of the Year	Collaborative Video of the Year
**Parker McCollum** — "**To Be Loved by You**"; Breland — "Cross Country"; Caitlyn Smith ft. Old Dominion — "I Can't"; Elvie Shane — "My Boy"; Priscilla Block — "Just About Over You"; Tenille Arts — "Back Then, Right Now"	**Jason Aldean** and **Carrie Underwood** — "**If I Didn't Love You**"; Carly Pearce and Ashley McBryde — "Never Wanted to Be That Girl"; Dustin Lynch and MacKenzie Porter — "Thinking 'Bout You"; Nelly and Florida Georgia Line — "Lil Bit"; Jimmie Allen and Brad Paisley — "Freedom Was a Highway"; Jordan Davis and Luke Bryan — "Buy Dirt"; Kelsea Ballerini and Kenny Chesney — "Half of My Hometown"
CMT Performance of the Year	CMT Digital-First Performance of the Year
**From CMT Giants: Charley Pride: George Strait** — "**Is Anybody Goin' to San Antone**"; From CMT Campfire Sessions: Brothers Osborne — "Muskrat Greene/Dead Man's Curve"; From 2021 CMT Music Awards: H.E.R. & Chris Stapleton, "Hold On"; From 2021 CMT Artist of the Year: Kane Brown — "Three Wooden Crosses"; From 2021 CMT Music Awards: Kelsea Ballerini & Paul Klein — "I Quit Drinking"; From 2021 CMT Music Awards: Mickey Guyton ft. Gladys Knight & Breland — "Friendship Train"; From CMT Crossroads: Nelly ft. Kane Brown, Blanco Brown & Breland — "Ride wit Me"	**Cody Johnson** — "**Dear Rodeo**"; Brittney Spencer — "Sober & Skinny"; Carly Pearce — "Dear Miss Loretta"; Jon Pardi — "On the Other Hand/Forever and Ever, Amen"; Josh Turner Live; Lainey Wilson — "Things a Man Oughta Know"
Trending Comeback Song of the Year
**Taylor Swift** — "**Love Story (Taylor's Version)**"; Alan Jackson — "Freight Train"; Brooks & Dunn — "Neon Moon"; Dolly Parton — "9 to 5"; Reba McEntire — "I'm a Survivor"; Sara Evans — "Suds in the Bucket"; Shania Twain — "Man! I Feel Like a Woman!"

== Performers ==
Performances include both the live performances shown on CBS and extended cut performances shown exclusively on CMT.

Performer(s)	Song(s)
Keith Urban	"Wild Hearts"
Lainey Wilson & Cole Swindell	"Never Say Never"
Little Big Town	"Hell Yeah"
Carly Pearce	"Diamondback"
Old Dominion	"Time, Tequila and Therapy"
Thomas Rhett & Riley Green	"Half of Me"
Carrie Underwood	"Ghost Story"
Jason Aldean & Bryan Adams	"Heaven"
Mickey Guyton & Black Pumas	"Colors"
Gabby Barrett	"Pick Me Up"
Cole Swindell	"Stereotype"
Lainey Wilson	"WWDD"
Walker Hayes	"AA"
Kelsea Ballerini	"Heartfirst"
Maren Morris & Ryan Hurd	"I Can't Love You Any More"
Cody Johnson	"'Til You Can't" "Human"
The Judds	"Love Can Build a Bridge"
Jimmie Allen, Monica & Little Big Town	"Pray"
Jason Aldean	"Trouble With A Hearbreak"
Kane Brown	"One Mississippi"
Miranda Lambert	"If I Was a Cowboy"
Kenny Chesney	"Beer in Mexico"

Ram Trucks Side Stage performances

- Priscilla Block, Breland, Jessie James Decker, Parker McCollum, Elvie Shane and Caitlyn Smith

== Presenters ==
The list of presenters were announced on April 7, 2022.

- Rob Corddry, presented Collaborative Video of the Year
- Jimmie Allen, introduced Old Dominion
- Jordan Davis, introduced Thomas Rhett and Riley Green
- Billy Gibbons, honored the 20th anniversary of CMT Crossroads
- LeAnn Rimes, introduced Mickey Guyton and Black Pumas
- Dylan Scott, presented Breakthrough Video of the Year
- Craig Morgan and Mike Singletary, introduced Walker Hayes
- Lily Aldridge, introduced Maren Morris and Ryan Hurd
- Dennis Quaid, introduced Cody Johnson
- Martina McBride, presented Female Video of the Year
- Kacey Musgraves, introduced The Judds
- Gabby Barrett and Dustin Lynch, presented Group/Duo Video of the Year
- Gayle King, introduced Jimmie Allen, Monica and Little Big Town and Honored CMT Equal Play
- Joel McHale, presented Male Video of the Year
- Taylor Lautner, introduced Kane Brown
- Bobby Berk, Karamo Brown, Tan France and Antoni Porowski, introduced Miranda Lambert
- Faith Hill and Isabel May, presented Video of the Year

== Milestones ==
- Carrie Underwood, often referred to as the "Queen of the CMT Music Awards", won her 24th and 25th CMT Music Award, extending her record as the most decorated artist in CMT Music Awards history.
- Kane Brown and Anthony Mackie marked the first black co-hosts of the CMT Music Awards.
