= 55th Annual Country Music Association Awards =

2021 award ceremony

- Date: November 10, 2021
- Location: Bridgestone Arena, Nashville, Tennessee
- Hosted by: Luke Bryan

Highlights
- Most wins: Chris Stapleton (4)
- Most nominations: Eric Church; Chris Stapleton (5 each)

Television/radio coverage
- Network: ABC
- Viewership: 8.4 million

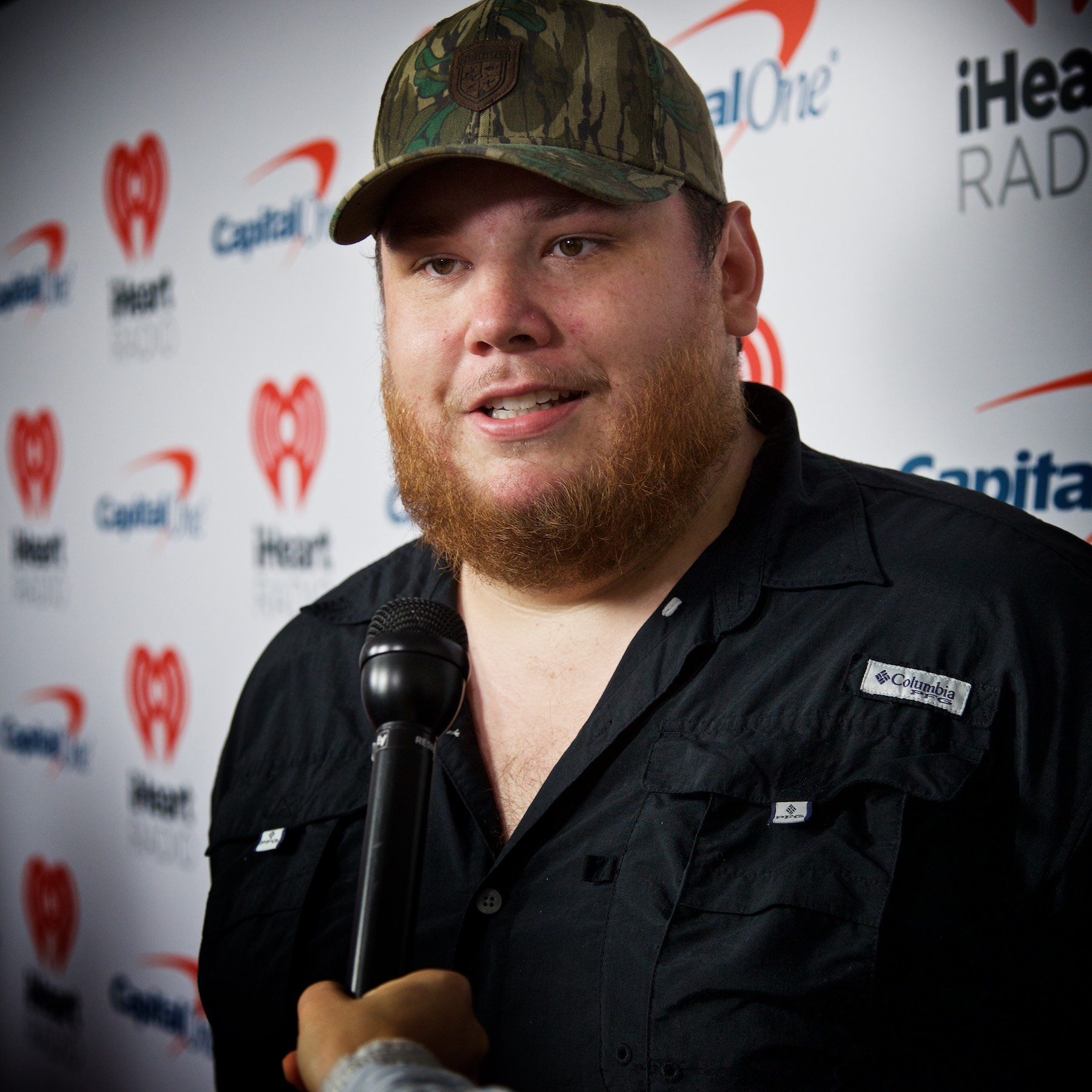
Luke Combs, Entertainer of the Year recipient.

The 55th Annual Country Music Association Awards were held on Wednesday, November 10, 2021, at the Bridgestone Arena in Nashville, Tennessee. The ceremony was hosted by CMA Award winner Luke Bryan.

== Background ==
After a video clip surfaced in early 2021 showing an inebriated Morgan Wallen using a racial slur the Country Music Association announced on May 21, 2021, that Wallen's 2021 CMA Awards eligibility would be limited to, “categories that honor artistic works (Single, Song, Album, Musical Event, and Music Video of the Year categories), so as not to "limit opportunity for other credited collaborators," but the press release further states that Wallen would not be eligible in solo categories as Entertainer of the Year and Male Vocalist of the Year.

On October 1, 2021, the CMA announced that Wallen would not be allowed to attend the 2021 ceremony or any of the pre-show pageantry, despite being nominated in the Album of the Year category. Speaking to the Los Angeles Times, CMA CEO Sarah Trahern said she didn't believe anyone had ever been disqualified from the show due to conduct before. "Honoring him as an individual this year is not right, and he will not be allowed on the red carpet, on our stage, or be celebrated in any way," she says.

On October 18, 2021 it was announced by the CMA that Luke Bryan will host the ceremony for the first time. This is the first time the ceremony has had a solo host in 18 years, the last being Vince Gill.

The CMA announced that ticketed audience members would have to prove full vaccination status against COVID-19 and wear appropriate face coverings. Performers and presenters were not expected to follow the same requirements as the audience.

== Winners and nominees ==
The eligibility period for nominees is July 1, 2020 to June 30, 2021. The nominees were announced on September 9, 2021.

Winners in Bold.

Entertainer of the Year	Album of the Year
**Luke Combs**; Eric Church; Miranda Lambert; Chris Stapleton; Carrie Underwood	**Starting Over** — **Chris Stapleton**; 29 — Carly Pearce; Dangerous: The Double Album — Morgan Wallen; Heart — Eric Church; Skeletons — Brothers Osborne
Male Vocalist of the Year	Female Vocalist of the Year
**Chris Stapleton**; Dierks Bentley; Eric Church; Luke Combs; Thomas Rhett	**Carly Pearce**; Gabby Barrett; Miranda Lambert; Ashley McBryde; Maren Morris
Vocal Group of the Year	Vocal Duo of the Year
**Old Dominion**; Lady A; Little Big Town; Midland; Zac Brown Band	**Brothers Osborne**; Brooks & Dunn; Dan + Shay; Florida Georgia Line; Maddie & Tae
Single of the Year	Song of the Year
**"Starting Over"** — **Chris Stapleton**; "Famous Friends" — Chris Young and Kane Brown; "The Good Ones" — Gabby Barrett; "Hell of a View" — Eric Church; "One Night Standards" — Ashley McBryde	**"Starting Over"** — **Mike Henderson** and **Chris Stapleton**; "Forever After All" — Luke Combs, Drew Parker and Robert Williford; "The Good Ones" — Gabby Barrett, Zach Kale, Emily Landis and Jim McCormick; "Hell of a View" — Casey Beathard, Eric Church and Monty Criswell; "One Night Standards" — Nicolette Hayford, Shane McAnally and Ashley McBryde
New Artist of the Year	Musician of the Year
**Jimmie Allen**; Ingrid Andress; Gabby Barrett; Mickey Guyton; HARDY	**Jenee Fleenor, fiddle**; Paul Franklin, steel guitar; Aaron Sterling, drums; Ilya Toshinsky, banjo; Derek Wells, guitar
Music Video of the Year	Musical Event of the Year
**"Half of My Hometown"** — **Kelsea Ballerini (feat. Kenny Chesney); (Dir. Patrick Tracy)**; "Chasing After You" — Ryan Hurd and Maren Morris; (Dir. TK McKamy); "Famous Friends" — Chris Young and Kane Brown; (Dir. Peter Zavadil); "Gone" — Dierks Bentley; (Dir. Wes Edwards and Ed Pryor); "Younger Me" — Brothers Osborne; (Dir. Reid Long)	**"Half of My Hometown"** — **Kelsea Ballerini** **(feat. Kenny Chesney)**; "Buy Dirt" — Jordan Davis and Luke Bryan; "Chasing After You" — Ryan Hurd and Maren Morris; "Drunk (And I Don't Wanna Go Home)" — Elle King and Miranda Lambert; "Famous Friends" — Chris Young and Kane Brown
Willie Nelson Lifetime Achievement Award
**Loretta Lynn**

International Awards

International Artist Achievement Award	Global Country Artist Award
**Luke Combs**	**The Shires**; Jill Johnson; Brett Kissel; The Wolfe Brothers

== Performers ==
The first wave of performers were announced on October 21, 2021, followed by the second and third waves on October 27 and November 4.

Performer(s)	Song(s)
Miranda Lambert	Medley of Greatest Hits “Kerosene” “Mama’s Broken Heart" “Bluebird” “Little Red Wagon” “Gunpowder and Lead”
Dierks Bentley; Hardy; Breland	"Beers on Me"
Eric Church	"Heart on Fire"
Carly Pearce; Ashley McBryde	"Never Wanted to Be That Girl"
Zac Brown Band	"Same Boat"
Gabby Barrett	"The Good Ones"
Chris Young; Kane Brown	"Famous Friends"
Jason Aldean; Carrie Underwood	"If I Didn't Love You"
Blake Shelton	"Come Back as a Country Boy"
Keith Urban	"Wild Hearts"
Mickey Guyton; Brittney Spencer; Madeline Edwards	"Love My Hair"
Old Dominion	"I Was on a Boat That Day"
Chris Stapleton	"Cold"
Luke Combs	"Doin' This"
Thomas Rhett	"Country Again"
Dan + Shay	"I Should Probably Go to Bed"
Jennifer Hudson; Chris Stapleton	Tribute to Aretha Franklin "Night Life" "You Are My Sunshine"
Jimmie Allen	"Freedom Was a Highway"
Brothers Osborne	"Younger Me"
Luke Bryan	"Up"
Luke Bryan	Closing Performance "I Don't Want This Night to End"

== Presenters ==
Presenter(s)	Notes
Carly Pearce; Mickey Guyton; Gabby Barrett	Introduced Miranda Lambert
Katy Perry; Lionel Richie; Luke Bryan	Song of the Year
Darius Rucker; Luke Bryan	Introduced Dierks Bentley
Ingrid Andress; Hayley Orrantia	Vocal Duo of the Year
Elle King	Introduced Zac Brown Band
Katy Perry; Lionel Richie; Luke Bryan	Introduced Gabby Barrett
Saycon Sengbloh; Dulé Hill	New Artist of the Year
Scotty McCreery	Introduced Chris Young and Kane Brown
Deana Carter; Lainey Wilson	Single of the Year; Carter and Wilson also performed some of "Strawberry Wine", which was celebrating its 25th anniversary
Faith Fennidy	Introduced Mickey Guyton
Russell Dickerson; Sarah Frei	Honoring music educators
Zachary Levi; Kurt Warner	Vocal Group of the Year
Lady A Luke Bryan	Introduced Thomas Rhett
Trace Adkins; Susan Sarandon	Album of the Year
Luke Bryan; Chris Young	Military tribute
Trisha Yearwood	Introduced Jennifer Hudson and Chris Stapleton
Amy Grant; Lauren Daigle	Female Vocalist of the Year
Florida Georgia Line	Introduced Luke Bryan
Freddie Freeman; Kelsea Ballerini	Male Vocalist of the Year
Alan Jackson	Entertainer of the Year

== Milestones ==
- Miranda Lambert became the third most-nominated artist in CMA history with 58 nominations including 3 this ceremony; Lambert is behind Alan Jackson (81) and George Strait (83).
- Mickey Guyton became the first black woman to be nominated for an individual award at the CMA awards.
  - Guyton is only the eighth black female artist ever to be nominated at the CMA awards, the previous nominees being The Pointer Sisters in for Vocal Group of the Year in 1975; Anita Pointer for Vocal Duo of the Year (with Earl Thomas Conley) in 1987; Natalie Cole, Gladys Knight, Patti LaBelle, The Pointer Sisters and The Staple Singers for Album of the Year in 1994 (Rhythm, Country and Blues); and Rhiannon Giddens for Musical Event of the Year (with Eric Church) in 2017 ("Kill a Word").
- Carly Pearce winning Female Vocalist of the Year, she joins to 8 other female artists to win on their first nomination: the first being Loretta Lynn, the second being Olivia Newton-John, the third being K.T. Oslin, the fourth being Mary Chapin Carpenter, the fifth being Alison Krauss, the sixth being Trisha Yearwood, the seventh being Gretchen Wilson and the eighth being Carrie Underwood.
- Jimmie Allen became the second African-American artist to win New Artist of the Year, the first being Darius Rucker in 2009.
