= 2022 iHeartRadio Music Awards =

Annual US music awards ceremony

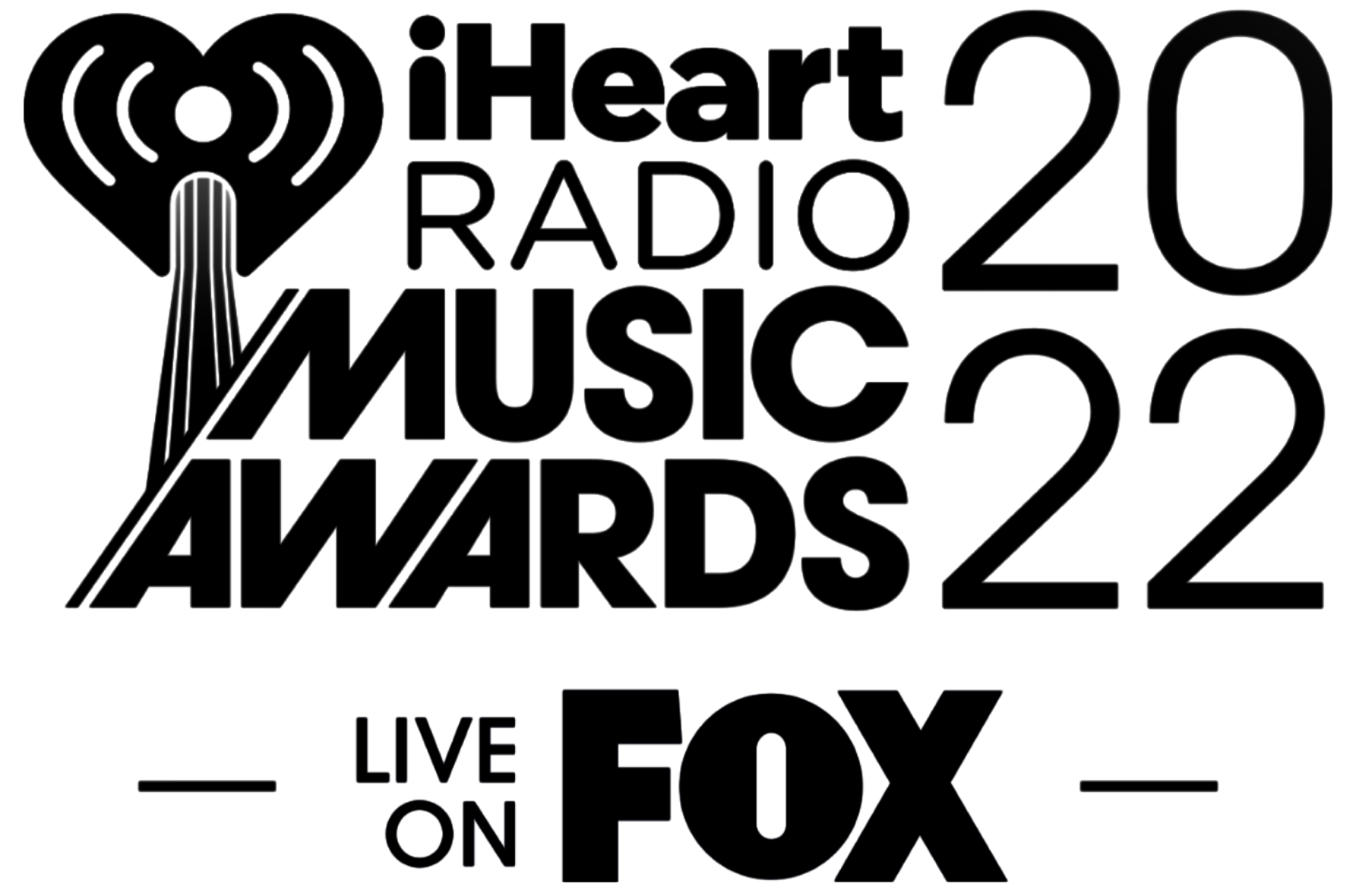
- Date: March 22, 2022
- Location: Shrine Auditorium, Los Angeles
- Country: United States
- Hosted by: LL Cool J
- Most awards: Olivia Rodrigo • Silk Sonic (3 each)
- Most nominations: Justin Bieber (10)
- Website: news.iheart.com/awards

Television/radio coverage
- Network: Fox

The 2022 iHeartRadio Music Awards were held at the Shrine Auditorium in Los Angeles on March 22, 2022, and was broadcast live on Fox from 8:00 PM to 10:00 PM EDT. The ceremony was returned to its traditional March schedule after the last two events were altered or postponed due to the COVID-19 pandemic, it was hosted by American rapper and actor LL Cool J.

During the ceremony Jennifer Lopez was honored with the Icon Award for be "cemented in history as a global icon and the ultimate multihyphenate". Megan Thee Stallion was recognized with the first Trailblazer Award.

== Performances ==
Performers were announced on March 9, 2022, through the iHeartRadio website.

Performers at the 2022 iHeartRadio Music Awards
Performer(s)	Song(s)
LL Cool J DJ Z-Trip Jabbawockeez	Medley: "Mama Said Knock You Out" "Flava in Ya Ear" "Rampage" "The Boomin' System" "Rock the Bells"
Måneskin	"Beggin'" "I Wanna Be Your Slave"
John Legend Charlie Puth	Duet: "See You Again" "Ordinary People" "Light Switch"
Jennifer Lopez	"On My Way" "Get Right"
Jason Aldean	Medley: "Dirt Road Anthem" "Trouble with a Heartbreak" "If I Didn't Love You"
Megan Thee Stallion	"Megan's Piano" "Sweetest Pie" (with Dua Lipa)

== Winners and nominees ==
iHeartRadio announced the nominees on January 27, 2022.

Winners are listed first and in bold

Song of the Year	Female Artist of the Year
**"Levitating" – Dua Lipa**; "Bad Habits" – Ed Sheeran; "Drivers License" – Olivia Rodrigo; "Easy on Me" – Adele; "Kiss Me More" – Doja Cat featuring SZA; "Leave the Door Open" – Silk Sonic (Bruno Mars and Anderson .Paak); "Montero (Call Me By Your Name)" – Lil Nas X; "Peaches" – Justin Bieber featuring Daniel Caesar and Giveon; "Positions" – Ariana Grande; "Stay" – The Kid Laroi and Justin Bieber	**Olivia Rodrigo**; Doja Cat; Ariana Grande; Dua Lipa; Taylor Swift
Male Artist of the Year	Best Duo/Group of the Year
**Lil Nas X**; Justin Bieber; Drake; Ed Sheeran; The Weeknd	**Silk Sonic (Bruno Mars and Anderson .Paak)**; AJR; BTS; Dan + Shay; Maroon 5
Album of the Year (per genre)	Best Collaboration
Alternative rock: **Happier Than Ever – Billie Eilish**; Country: **Dangerous: The Double Album – Morgan Wallen**; Dance: **Future Nostalgia – Dua Lipa**; Latin pop/Reggaeton: **KG0516 – Karol G**; Pop: **30 – Adele**; R&B: **An Evening with Silk Sonic – Silk Sonic (Bruno Mars and Anderson .Paak)**; Hip-Hop: **The Off-Season – J. Cole**; Regional Mexican: **Corta Venas – Eslabon Armado**; Rock: **Medicine at Midnight – Foo Fighters**	**"Stay" – The Kid Laroi and Justin Bieber**; "Best Friend" – Saweetie featuring Doja Cat; "If I Didn't Love You" – Jason Aldean and Carrie Underwood; "Kiss Me More" – Doja Cat featuring SZA; "Peaches" – Justin Bieber featuring Daniel Caesar and Giveon
Best New Pop Artist	Alternative Rock Song of the Year
**Olivia Rodrigo**; Giveon; The Kid Laroi; Måneskin; Tate McRae	**"Monsters" – All Time Low featuring Blackbear**; "All My Favorite Songs" – Weezer featuring AJR; "Follow You" – Imagine Dragons; "My Ex's Best Friend" – Machine Gun Kelly featuring Blackbear; "Shy Away" – Twenty One Pilots
Alternative Rock Artist of the Year	Best New Alternative Artist
**Machine Gun Kelly**; All Time Low; Billie Eilish; Imagine Dragons; Twenty One Pilots	**Måneskin**; Cannons; Clairo; Girl in Red; Willow Smith
Rock Song of the Year	Rock Artist of the Year
**"Waiting on a War" – Foo Fighters**; "And So It Went" – The Pretty Reckless; "Living the Dream" – Five Finger Death Punch; "Nowhere Generation" – Rise Against; "Wait a Minute My Girl" – Volbeat	**Foo Fighters**; Chevelle; Five Finger Death Punch; Mammoth WVH; The Pretty Reckless
Country Song of the Year	Country Artist of the Year
**"If I Didn't Love You" – Jason Aldean and Carrie Underwood**; "The Good Ones" – Gabby Barrett; "Famous Friends" – Chris Young and Kane Brown; "Forever After All" – Luke Combs; "Just the Way" – Parmalee and Blanco Brown	**Luke Combs**; Jason Aldean; Luke Bryan; Miranda Lambert; Thomas Rhett
Best New Country Artist	Dance Song of the Year
**Lainey Wilson**; Tenille Arts; Ryan Hurd; Parker McCollum; Niko Moon	**"Do It to It" – Acraze featuring Cherish**; "Bed" – Joel Corry, Raye and David Guetta; "Heartbreak Anthem" – Galantis, David Guetta and Little Mix; "Love Tonight" – Shouse; "You" – Regard, Troye Sivan and Tate McRae
Dance Artist of the Year	Hip-Hop Song of the Year
**David Guetta**; Joel Corry; Anabel Englund; Regard; Swedish House Mafia	**"What You Know Bout Love" – Pop Smoke**; "Essence" – Wizkid featuring Tems; "Time Today" – Moneybagg Yo; "Up" – Cardi B; "Way 2 Sexy" – Drake featuring Future and Young Thug
Hip-Hop Artist of the Year	Best New Hip-Hop Artist
**Drake**; Lil Baby; Megan Thee Stallion; Moneybagg Yo; Pop Smoke	**Yung Bleu**; Bia; Coi Leray; Lil Tjay; Pooh Shiesty
R&B Song of the Year	R&B Artist of the Year
**"Leave the Door Open" – Silk Sonic (Bruno Mars and Anderson .Paak)**; "Damage" – H.E.R; "Good Days" – SZA; "Heartbreak Anniversary" – Giveon; "Pick Up Your Feelings" – Jazmine Sullivan	**Jazmine Sullivan**; Giveon; H.E.R; Silk Sonic (Bruno Mars and Anderson .Paak); Tank
Best New R&B Artist	Latin Pop/Reggaeton Song of the Year
**Giveon**; Chlöe; Tone Stith; VanJess; Vedo	**"Pepas" – Farruko**; "Bichota" – Karol G; "In Da Getto" – J Balvin and Skrillex; "Todo De Ti" – Rauw Alejandro; "Yongauni" – Bad Bunny
Latin Pop/Reggaeton Artist of the Year	Best New Latin Artist
**Bad Bunny**; J Balvin; Camilo; Farruko; Karol G; Rauw Alejandro	**Grupo Firme**; Eslabon Armado; María Becerra; Nicki Nicole; Tokischa
Regional Mexican Song of the Year	Regional Mexican Artist of the Year
**"La Casita" – Banda Sinaloense MS De Sergio Lizárraga**; "A La Antigüita" – Calibre 50; "Dime Cómo Quieres" – Christian Nodal and Ángela Aguilar; "Mi Primer Derrota" – La Arrolladora Banda El Limón De René Camacho; "¿Qué Tienen Tus Palabras?" – Banda El Recodo de Cruz Lizárraga; "Saludos a Mi Ex" – Edwin Luna y La Trakalosa de Monterrey	**Calibre 50**; Banda Sinaloense MS De Sergio Lizárraga; La Arrolladora Banda El Limón De René Camacho; Edwin Luna y La Tracalosa de Monterrey; Christian Nodal
Best New Rock Artist	Best Comeback Album (socially voted)
**Mammoth WVH**; All Good Things; Architects; Ayron Jones; Zero 9:36	**Adele – 30**; ABBA – Voyage; Bleachers – Take the Sadness Out of Saturday Night; Drake – Certified Lover Boy; Foo Fighters – Medicine at Midnight; Lorde – Solar Power; Kacey Musgraves – Star-Crossed
Best Lyrics (socially voted)	Best Cover Song (socially voted)
**"All Too Well (10 Minute Version) (Taylor's Version) (From the Vault)" – Taylor Swift**; "Bad Habits" – Ed Sheeran; "Deja Vu" – Olivia Rodrigo; "Drivers License" – Olivia Rodrigo; "Easy On Me" – Adele; "Heat Waves" – Glass Animals; "Leave the Door Open" – Silk Sonic (Bruno Mars and Anderson .Paak); "Montero (Call Me By Your Name)" – Lil Nas X; "Your Power" – Billie Eilish	**"Good 4 U" (Olivia Rodrigo) – Camila Cabello**; "Fix You" (Coldplay) – Kacey Musgraves; "Happier Than Ever" (Billie Eilish) – Shawn Mendes; "Heather" (Conan Gray) – Tate McRae; "Jolene" (Dolly Parton) – Lil Nas X; "I'm Still Standing" (Elton John) – Demi Lovato; "Nothing Else Matters" (Metallica) – Miley Cyrus
Best Fan Army (socially voted)	Best Music Video (socially voted)
**BTS – BTSARMY**; Justin Bieber – Beliebers; Big Time Rush – Rushers; Ariana Grande – Arianators; Selena Gomez – Selenators; Megan Thee Stallion – Hotties; Olivia Rodrigo – Livies; Harry Styles – Harries; Taylor Swift – Swifties; Louis Tomlinson – Louies; Why Don't We – Limelights	**"Butter" – BTS**; "Bad Habits" – Ed Sheeran; "Build a Bitch" – Bella Poarch; "Drivers License" – Olivia Rodrigo; "Kiss Me More" – Doja Cat featuring SZA; "Leave the Door Open" – Silk Sonic (Bruno Mars and Anderson .Paak); "Montero (Call Me By Your Name)" – Lil Nas X; "Peaches" – Justin Bieber featuring Daniel Caesar and Giveon; "Save Your Tears" – The Weeknd; "Stay" – The Kid Laroi and Justin Bieber
Social Star Award (socially voted)	Favorite Tour Photographer (socially voted)
**Bella Poarch**; Tayler Holder; Jax; Jordy; Claire Rosinkranz; Tai Verdes	**Love On Tour (Harry Styles) – Anthony Pham**; 2021 Tour (Maroon 5) – Travis Schneider; All-American Road Show Tour (Chris Stapleton) – Andy Barron; The Comeback Tour (Zac Brown Band) – Projectblackboxx; Hella Mega Tour (Fall Out Boy and Green Day) – Elliott Ingham; Remember This Tour (Jonas Brothers) – Cynthia Parkhurst; What You See Is What You Get Tour (Luke Combs) – David Bergman
TikTok Bop of the Year (socially voted)	TikTok Songwriter of the Year (socially voted)
**"Good 4 U" – Olivia Rodrigo**; "Beggin'" – Måneskin; "Just for Me" – PinkPantheress; "Kiss Me More" – Doja Cat featuring SZA; "Montero (Call Me By Your Name)" – Lil Nas X; "Stay" – The Kid Laroi and Justin Bieber; "Thot Shit" – Megan Thee Stallion; "Twinnem" – Coi Leray; "Up" – Cardi B; "Woman" – Doja Cat	**Jax**; Aston; Sarah Barrios; Alexa Chalnick; Ellie Dixon; Cassa Jackson; Peytan Porter; vaultboy; Lauren Weintraub
Producer of the Year	Songwriter of the Year
**Finneas**; Max Martin; Oscar Holter; Blake Slatkin; Travis Barker	**Omar Fedi**; Ashley Gorley; Dan Nigro; Belly; Andrew Goldstein
Tour of the Year	Icon Award
**Harry Styles – Love On Tour**	**Jennifer Lopez**
Trailblazer Award	iHeartRadio Chart Ruler Award
**Megan Thee Stallion**	**"Stay" – The Kid Laroi and Justin Bieber**
