= That's What Tequila Does =

Single by Jason Aldean

from the album Macon, Georgia
- Released: July 18, 2022
- Genre: Country
- Length: 3:09
- Label: Broken Bow
- Songwriters: John Morgan; John Edwards; Tully Kennedy; Kurt Allison
- Producer: Michael Knox

Jason Aldean singles chronology
"Trouble with a Heartbreak" (2022)	"That's What Tequila Does" (2022)	"Try That in a Small Town" (2023)

"That's What Tequila Does" is a song written by John Morgan, John Edwards, Tully Kennedy and Kurt Allison and recorded by American country music artist Jason Aldean. It was released on July 18, 2022 as the third and final single from Aldean's tenth studio album Macon, Georgia.

== Content ==
The song describes drinking away the sting of a lost love, albeit with tequila and demonstrating how it can lead to thinking in different and dangerous ways, remarking in part, "that's what tequila does."

== Critical reception ==
Jeffrey Kurtis of Today's Country Magazine wrote, "Though drinking away heartache is certainly nothing new to country music, by shifting the focus of the lyrics to show how it can torture you and trick you into thinking in different and dangerous ways, Aldean provides a fresh perspective to the old idea."

== Chart performance ==
The song debuted at number 47 on Country Airplay. It would later enter Hot Country Songs at number 41. Topping out at 77 on the Billboard Hot 100, and 19 on Billboard's Hot Country Songs chart, it became the lowest-charting officially-issued single of Aldean's career on either chart. (Several songs that were not released as singles charted lower on Billboard charts as a result of unsolicited airplay.)

== Charts ==
=== Weekly charts ===
Weekly chart performance
Chart (2022–2023)	Peak position
Canada Country (Billboard)	9
US Billboard Hot 100	77
US Country Airplay (Billboard)	5
US Hot Country Songs (Billboard)	19

=== Year-end charts ===
Year-end chart performance
Chart (2022)	Position
US Hot Country Songs (Billboard)	92

Chart (2023)	Position
US Country Airplay (Billboard)	24
US Hot Country Songs (Billboard)	61
US Radio Songs (Billboard)	73

== Release history ==
Release history for "That's What Tequila Does"
Region	Date	Format	Label	Ref.
Various	November 12, 2021	Digital download; streaming	Broken Bow	
United States	July 18, 2022	Country radio	Broken Bow	
