= Carols and Candlelight =

Studio album by Gabby Barrett
- Released: November 8, 2024
- Genre: Christmas; country
- Length: 42:27
- Label: Warner Nashville
- Producer: Ross Copperman

Gabby Barrett chronology
Chapter & Verse (2020)	Carols and Candlelight (2024)

Carols and Candlelight is the third studio album and first Christmas record from American country music singer Gabby Barrett. The album was released on November 8, 2024, via Warner Music Nashville.

== Background ==
Barrett first announced Carols and Candlelight on October 21, 2024, via her social media accounts. The album features 11 tracks, all of which are a mix of covers of traditional and modern Christmas songs, including collaborations with Barrett's husband Cade Foehner ("Baby, It's Cold Outside"), The Piano Guys ("O Come, O Come, Emmanuel"), and For King & Country ("Go Tell It on the Mountain"). The latter duet was previously featured on For King & Country's 2020 album, A Drummer Boy Christmas, and is the only song on the album not produced by Ross Copperman, who produced both of Barrett's previous studio albums.

Barrett compiled the track listing with the help of her fans, while also including personal favorites, such as "A Christmas to Remember", which has a special significance from her childhood. Her versions of "I'll Be Home for Christmas" and "O Come, O Come, Emmanuel" were issued as promotional singles in the two weeks prior to the album's release.

On November 7, 2025, a deluxe reissue of the album was released.

== Track listing ==
Carols and Candlelight track listing
No.	Title	Writer(s)	Length
1.	"Mary, Did You Know?"	Buddy Greene; Mark Lowry	3:43
2.	"I'll Be Home for Christmas"	Kim Gannon; Walter Kent; Buck Ram	3:20
3.	"A Christmas to Remember"	Dolly Parton	3:42
4.	"The First Noel"	Traditional	4:24
5.	"Baby, It's Cold Outside" (with Cade Foehner)	Frank Loesser	3:06
6.	"O Come, O Come, Emmanuel" (featuring The Piano Guys)	Traditional	5:15
7.	"Go Tell It on the Mountain" (For King & Country featuring Gabby Barrett)	Traditional	3:18
8.	"O Holy Night"	Traditional	4:33
9.	"Last Christmas"	George Michael	3:49
10.	"Grown-Up Christmas List"	David Foster; Linda Thompson-Jenner	3:41
11.	"Silent Night"	Traditional	3:30
Total length:			42:27

Deluxe edition
No.	Title	Writer(s)	Length
1.	"Where Are You Christmas?"	Mariah Carey; James Horner; Will Jennings	3:53
2.	"When Christmas Comes to Town"	Glen Ballard; Alan Silvestri	3:45
Total length:			50:06

== Personnel ==
=== Musicians ===
- Gabby Barrett – vocals
- Danny Rader – acoustic guitar (tracks 1–5, 8–11), nylon-strung guitar (2, 4, 11), electric guitar (4, 11); bass, percussion, piano, programming (4); Hammond B3 organ (11)
- Ross Copperman – background vocals (tracks 1, 3, 9), programming (1, 4), electric guitar (3, 9); percussion, synthesizer (9)
- Jeff Roach – piano (tracks 1–3, 5, 8, 10), synthesizer (1), Hammond B3 organ (2, 3), Wurlitzer (9)
- Evan Hutchings – drums, percussion (tracks 1–3, 5, 8–10)
- Justin Schipper – pedal steel guitar (tracks 1–3, 5, 8–10)
- Mark Hill – bass (tracks 1–3, 5, 9, 10)
- Eleonore Denig – cello, viola (tracks 1, 8, 10); violin (8, 10)
- Jenee Fleenor – fiddle (track 3)
- Cade Foehner – vocals (track 5), acoustic guitar (11)
- The Piano Guys – cello, piano (track 6)
- Benjamin Backus – arrangement, horn, piano, programming, synthesizer (track 7)
- Tedd Tjornhorn – arrangement, programming (track 7)
- Joel Smallbone – arrangement (track 7)
- Luke Smallbone – arrangement (track 7)
- Vince DiCarlo – bass, horn, pedal steel guitar (track 7)
- Teddy Boldt – drums (track 7)
- Mark Campbell – guitar, synthesizer (track 7)
- Ezra Salmine – harmonica (track 7)
- Ruth Wall – harp (track 7)
- Jordan Katz – horn (track 7)
- Daniel Jones – percussion (track 7)
- Stephen Lynch – percussion (track 7)
- Jake Halm – programming (track 7)
- Matt Hales – programming (track 7)
- Davide Rossi – strings (track 7)

=== Technical ===
- Ross Copperman – production, mixing (tracks 1–6, 8–11); recording (11), additional engineering (2, 6)
- Benjamin Backus – production (track 7)
- Tedd T – production (track 7)
- For King & Country – production (track 7)
- Daniel Bacigalupi – mastering (tracks 1–6, 8–11)
- David Kutch – mastering (track 7)
- Ben Baptie – mixing (track 8)
- Buckley Miller – recording (tracks 1–5, 8–11)
- Cade Foehner – recording (tracks 1, 4, 8–10), additional engineering (2, 6)
- James Viega – recording (tracks 1, 4, 8–10), additional engineering (2, 6)
- Al van der Beek – recording (track 6)
- Craig White – recording (track 7)
- Justin "Corky" Cortelyou – editing (tracks 1–6, 8–11)
- Zach Kuhlman – recording assistance (track 2)
- Rose Hutcheson – production management (tracks 1–6, 8–11)
- Scott Johnson – production management (tracks 1–6, 8–11)

== Charts ==
Chart performance for Carols and Candlelight
Chart (2025)	Peak position
US Top Christian Albums (Billboard)	26
