= Brothers Osborne (album) =

Studio album by Brothers Osborne
- Released: September 15, 2023
- Genre: Country rock
- Length: 34:45
- Label: EMI Nashville
- Producer: Mike Elizondo

Brothers Osborne chronology
Skeletons (2020)	Brothers Osborne (2023)	Break Mine - EP (2024)

Singles from Brothers Osborne
- 1. "Nobody's Nobody" Released: April 7, 2023

Brothers Osborne is the fourth studio album by American country music duo Brothers Osborne. It was released by EMI Nashville on September 15, 2023, and was produced by Mike Elizondo, marking their first project not to be produced by Jay Joyce. The album includes the single "Nobody's Nobody" and features a collaboration with Miranda Lambert.

== Background ==
The album was announced on July 14, 2023, alongside the release of promotional track "Sun Ain't Even Gone Down Yet". In a statement, TJ Osborne explained "we've always had a lot of mystery intentionally around the things we have done, but with this album, we decided to be all in, and doing that reminded me of what it was like when I first started playing music, when it was an outlet for my angst or just a way to have fun". Discussing their personal growth and how the project varies from the duo's previous album Skeletons, John Osborne stated "since our last record, we've been very forthcoming with who we are. By acknowledging TJ's personal life and my mental-health struggles, we are more ourselves creatively and publicly than we've ever been."

TJ noted that he felt this album was a "defining record" for the duo at this point in their career, adding "we needed to put it all on our shoulders and we did. Like it was when we were growing up, it's just John and me". Similarly, John explained that they were always committed to pushing themselves and evolving their sound but acknowledged that "at the end of the day, we are also who we are".

== Track listing ==
Brothers Osborne track listing
No.	Title	Writer(s)	Length
1.	"Who Says You Can't Have Everything"	Casey Beathard; John Osborne; TJ Osborne	3:08
2.	"Nobody's Nobody"	Mike Elizondo; Kendell Marvel; J. Osborne; TJ Osborne	3:09
3.	"Might as Well Be Me"	Julian Bunetta; Corey Crowder; J. Osborne; TJ Osborne	2:49
4.	"Sun Ain't Even Gone Down Yet"	Crowder; J. Osborne; TJ Osborne	3:02
5.	"Goodbye's Kickin' In"	Elizondo; Lee Thomas Miller; J. Osborne; TJ Osborne	3:21
6.	"Love You Too"	Jessie Jo Dillon; Jesse Frasure; J. Osborne; TJ Osborne	3:00
7.	"New Bad Habit"	Miller; J. Osborne; TJ Osborne	2:55
8.	"We Ain't Good at Breaking Up" (featuring Miranda Lambert)	Frasure; Miranda Lambert; J. Osborne; TJ Osborne	3:04
9.	"Back Home"	J. Osborne; TJ Osborne; Miller	3:14
10.	"Ain't Nobody Got Time for That"	J. Osborne; TJ Osborne; Stephen Wilson Jr.	3:41
11.	"Rollercoaster (Forever and a Day)"	Jamie Hartman; J. Osborne; TJ Osborne	3:15
Total length:			34:45

== Personnel ==
Brothers Osborne

- John Osborne – electric guitar (tracks 1–10), background vocals (1–6, 8–10), acoustic guitar (1–4, 6, 8, 9, 11), percussion (4), piano (7)
- T. J. Osborne – vocals (all tracks), background vocals (1–10), acoustic guitar (4), electric guitar (4)

Additional musicians

- Mike Elizondo – bass (1–4, 6–9), keyboards (1–4, 6–8, 10), drum programming (2–4, 6, 8–10), acoustic guitar (2), background vocals (4, 6), percussion (4), synth bass (10)
- Abe Laboriel Jr. - drums (1–10), percussion (4, 5, 7, 8, 10)
- Philip Towns – keyboards (1–3, 6, 8, 10), Wurlitzer organ (2), Hammond B3 (3), piano (4), organ (5, 7), Wurlitzer electric piano (5, 9), Rhodes (8)
- Russ Pahl – steel guitar (1), pedal steel (8, 11), Jew's harp (10)
- Alex Wilder – background vocals (4)
- Erica Block – background vocals (4)
- Matt Combs – violin, viola (5, 10)
- Denise Carite – background vocals (5)
- Jannelle Means – background vocals (5)
- Shaneka Hamilton – background vocals (5)
- Miranda Lambert – background vocals (8)
- Evyn Mustoe Johnston – background vocals (10)
- Jaren Johnston – background vocals (10)
- Austin Hoke – cello (11)
- Dave Cohen – piano (11)
- Jordan Lehning – strings conductor, string arrangement (11)
- Annaliese Kowert – violin (11)
- Laura Epling – violin (11)

Technical

- Mike Elizondo – production
- Chris Gehringer – mastering
- Adam Hawkins – mixing
- Justin Francis – engineering
- Alex Wilder – engineering assistance
- Erica Block – engineering assistance

== Charts ==
Chart performance for Brothers Osborne
Chart (2023)	Peak position
Scottish Albums (OCC)	15
UK Album Downloads (OCC)	17
UK Country Albums (OCC)	10
US Billboard 200	192
US Top Country Albums (Billboard)	28
