= Nobody's Nobody =

Single by Brothers Osborne

from the album Brothers Osborne
- Released: April 7, 2023
- Genre: Country
- Length: 3:09
- Songwriters: Mike Elizondo; Kendell Marvel; John Osborne; T.J. Osborne
- Producer: Mike Elizondo

Brothers Osborne singles chronology
"I'm Not for Everyone" (2021)	"Nobody's Nobody" (2023)	"Break Mine" (2024)

"Nobody's Nobody" is a song by American country music duo Brothers Osborne. It was released on April 7, 2023 as the lead single from their fourth studio album Brothers Osborne.

== History ==
The two members of Brothers Osborne, brothers T.J. and John Osborne, wrote "Nobody's Nobody" with Kendell Marvel and Mike Elizondo, the latter of whom also produced the song. The four of them wrote the song on September 26, 2022 during a recording session for the duo's fourth album Brothers Osborne. Elizondo came up with a chord pattern on a Wurlitzer electric piano on which he added an effects pedal to create a delay. Marvel came up with the title "Nobody's Nobody", which he originally conceived as having a "sad" tone until T.J. suggested the song convey the message that "everybody is somebody". T.J. told Billboard writer Tom Roland that the song is about "everyone has changed the trajectory of someone else's life". Elizondo recorded the song and played bass guitar on it, with Abe Laboriel Jr. on drums and Philip Towns on keyboards. John Osborne plays a number of guitar parts on the final recording and also contributes backing vocals. The song was initially released in April 2023 as one of three promotional tracks preceding the album's release.

== Charts ==
Chart performance for "Nobody's Nobody"
Chart (2023–2024)	Peak position
Canada Country (Billboard)	30
US Country Airplay (Billboard)	22
US Hot Country Songs (Billboard)	49
