= Macon, Georgia (album) =

2021/2022 studio album by Jason Aldean

- Cover art for the vinyl release featuring both sides of the album; Macon has a red tint, while Georgia has a blue tint. Walmart exclusive versions feature Macon with a dark blue tint and Georgia with a yellow tint.

Studio album by Jason Aldean
- Released: November 12, 2021 (Macon); April 22, 2022 (Georgia)
- Recorded: 2020–2021
- Genres: Country; country rock
- Length: 52:13 (Macon); 53:21 (Georgia)
- Labels: Broken Bow; Macon Music
- Producers: Michael Knox; Chris Stephens

Jason Aldean chronology
9 (2019)	Macon, Georgia (2021/2022)	Highway Desperado (2023)

Singles from Macon, Georgia
- 1. "If I Didn't Love You" Released: July 23, 2021; 2. "Trouble with a Heartbreak" Released: January 14, 2022; 3. "That's What Tequila Does" Released: July 18, 2022

Macon, Georgia is the tenth studio album by American country music artist Jason Aldean. It is a double album, with the first half, Macon, released on November 12, 2021, and Georgia, the second half, released on April 22, 2022.

== Content ==
Preceding the release of Macon was the release of the single "If I Didn't Love You", featuring Carrie Underwood. The album's full tracklist was revealed on September 27, 2021. Aldean said of the album, "Where you were raised has such a big influence on who you become, and for me it’s no different."

== Critical reception ==
Stephen Thomas Erlewine of AllMusic, while criticizing both sides of the album for delivering only a similar sound and vocal attack to "Burnin' It Down", praised Macon by stating "By changing gears every so often, Aldean manages to give Macon a slight hint of a pulse." Erlewine also criticized Macon for its use of five live tracks while offering only ten new tracks, and drubbed Georgia for Aldean's use of AutoTune on the track "Ain't Enough Cowboy" while relying on his old tricks for every other track. He also stated that "maybe Aldean delivers what fans want, but he has no ambition greater than ensuring that Georgia is a relatively polished piece of crowd-pleasing product."

== Commercial performance ==
Macon debuted at number eight on the Billboard 200, earning 37,000 units, of which 19,000 were album units. It also debuted at number three on the Top Country Albums chart, as well as number one on the Independent Albums chart, making it his eighth consecutive number one on the latter chart.

Georgia also debuted at number eight on the Billboard 200, earning 26,000 album-equivalent units, including 13,000 pure album sales.

"Small Town Small," a track from the album, is used as the theme song of Nevada Backstage, a radio show hosted by local author Jim Umbach on Northern Nevada's Voice, KNNR/KPGF, which airs every Saturday at 9 a.m. in Reno, Nevada on 93.7, 103.3, and 1400.

== Track listing ==
Macon track listing
No.	Title	Writer(s)	Length
1.	"After You"	Michael Tyler; Micah Wilshire; Thomas Archer	2:59
2.	"Over You Again"	Kurt Allison; Tully Kennedy; John Morgan; Lydia Vaughan	3:13
3.	"That's What Tequila Does"	Morgan; John Edwards; Kennedy; Allison	3:09
4.	"Small Town Small"	Brantley Gilbert; Michael Ray; Josh Phillips; Taylor Phillips; Brock Berryhill; Brandon Day; Chase McGill; Brian Davis	2:53
5.	"If I Didn't Love You" (featuring Carrie Underwood)	Morgan; Kennedy; Allison; Vaughan	3:32
6.	"Story for Another Glass"	Josh Thompson; Justin Ebach	3:07
7.	"Heaven"	Bryan Adams; Jim Vallance	4:11
8.	"This Bar Don't Work Anymore"	Morgan; Kennedy; Allison; Vaughan	3:47
9.	"The Sad Songs"	Brandon Kinney; Morgan Wallen; Thompson	3:32
10.	"Watching You Love Me"	Neil Thrasher; Lee Thomas Miller; Wendell Mobley	2:51
11.	"Amarillo Sky" (live in Nashville, Tennessee)	Big Kenny; John Rich; Rodney Clawson; Bart Pursley	3:21
12.	"Johnny Cash" (live in Los Angeles, California)	Clawson; Vicky McGehee; Rich	3:16
13.	"She's Country" (live in Las Vegas, Nevada)	Bridgette Tatum; Danny Myrick	3:54
14.	"Big Green Tractor" (live in Dallas, Texas)	Jim Collins; David Lee Murphy	3:16
15.	"My Kinda Party" (live in St. Louis, Missouri)	Gilbert	5:06

Georgia track listing
No.	Title	Writer(s)	Length
1.	"Whiskey Me Away"	Driver Williams; Jeff Hyde; Wallen; Clawson	3:14
2.	"Trouble with a Heartbreak"	Brett Beavers; Morgan; Allison; Kennedy	3:16
3.	"The State I'm In"	Jaron Boyer; Morgan; Will Bundy	3:20
4.	"Midnight and Missin' You"	Edwards; Morgan; Allison; Kennedy	3:07
5.	"Ain't Enough Cowboy"	Lalo Guzman; Tyler; Archer	2:36
6.	"God Made Airplanes"	Brad Warren; Brett Warren; Jessi Alexander; Morgan	3:39
7.	"My Weakness"	Barry Dean; Gordie Sampson; Hillary Lindsey	3:55
8.	"Holy Water"	Craig Wiseman; Ernest K. Smith; Jacob Durrett	3:21
9.	"Rock and Roll Cowboy"	Thrasher; Rhett Akins	3:12
10.	"Your Mama"	Ben West; Josh Miller; Troy Verges; Tyler Hubbard	4:24
11.	"Take a Little Ride" (live in Las Vegas, Nevada)	Dylan Altman; Clawson; Jim McCormick	3:47
12.	"Burnin' It Down" (live in St. Louis, Missouri)	Clawson; Chris Tompkins; Hubbard; Brian Kelley	3:41
13.	"Any Ol' Barstool" (live in Knoxville, Tennessee)	Deric Ruttan; Thompson	3:22
14.	"Rearview Town" (live in St. Louis, Missouri)	Kelley Lovelace; Bobby Pinson; Thrasher	3:25
15.	"Blame It on You" (live in Manchester, Tennessee)	Allison; Edwards; Kennedy; Tyler; Tyler Phillips; Brian Gene White	3:28

== Personnel ==
=== Macon ===
Adapted from Macon liner notes.

==== Musicians ====
- Jason Aldean – lead vocals, acoustic guitar (tracks 11–15)
- Rich Redmond – drums, percussion
- Tully Kennedy – bass guitar, programming, background vocals (tracks 11–15)
- Kurt Allison – electric guitar, programming
- Jack Sizemore – electric guitar and background vocals (tracks 11–15)
- Jay Jackson – steel guitar and background vocals (tracks 11–15)
- Adam Shoenfeld – electric guitar, slide guitar
- Danny Rader – acoustic guitar, 12-string guitar, hi-strung guitar
- Russ Pahl – steel guitar
- Mike Johnson – steel guitar
- Tony Harrell – synth, piano, keys, Wurlitzer, B3
- Micah Wilshire – acoustic guitar, programming
- Blake Bollinger – programming
- Michael Knox – programming
- Carrie Underwood – featured vocals (track 5)
- Perry Coleman – background vocals
- Mickey Jack Cones – background vocals
- Lydia Vaughan – background vocals
- Neil Thrasher – background vocals

==== Technical ====
- Michael Knox – producer (tracks 1–10)
- Jeff Braun – mixing (tracks 1–10)
- Brandon Epps – assistant engineer, editing engineer (tracks 1–10)
- Chris Stephens – producer (tracks 11–15)
- Josh Reynolds – mixing (tracks 11–15)
- Matthew Singler – editing engineer (tracks 11–15)
- Adam Ayan – mastering
- Shalacy Griffin – production coordinator

=== Georgia ===
Adapted from Georgia liner notes.

==== Musicians ====
- Jason Aldean – lead vocals, acoustic guitar (tracks 11–15)
- Rich Redmond – drums, percussion
- Tully Kennedy – bass guitar, programming, background vocals (tracks 11–15)
- Kurt Allison – electric guitar, programming
- Jack Sizemore – electric guitar and background vocals (tracks 11–15)
- Jay Jackson – steel guitar and background vocals (tracks 11–15)
- Adam Shoenfeld – electric guitar, slide guitar
- Danny Rader – acoustic guitar, 12-string guitar, hi-strung guitar
- Russ Pahl – steel guitar
- Tony Harrell – synth, keys, B3
- Lalo – keys, electric guitar, programming
- Blake Bollinger – programming
- Michael Knox – programming
- Jacob Rice – programming
- Chris Thompkins – programming (tracks 11–15)
- Jerry Roe – programming (tracks 11–15)
- Perry Coleman – background vocals
- Micah Wilshire – background vocals
- Neil Thrasher – background vocals
- Michael Tyler – background vocals (tracks 11–15)

==== Technical ====
- Michael Knox – producer (tracks 1–10)
- Jeff Braun – mixing (tracks 1–10)
- Brandon Epps – assistant engineer, editing engineer (tracks 1–10)
- Chris Stephens – producer (tracks 11–15)
- Josh Reynolds – mixing (tracks 11–15)
- Matthew Singler – editing engineer (tracks 11–15)
- Adam Ayan – mastering
- Shalacy Griffin – production coordinator

== Charts ==
=== Weekly charts ===
==== Macon ====
Weekly chart performance for Macon
Chart (2021)	Peak position
Australian Albums (ARIA)	81
Canadian Albums (Billboard)	26
UK Country Albums (Official Charts)	6
UK Album Downloads (Official Charts)	65
US Billboard 200	8
US Top Country Albums (Billboard)	3
US Independent Albums (Billboard)	1

==== Georgia ====
Weekly chart performance for Georgia
Chart (2022)	Peak position
Canadian Albums (Billboard)	35
UK Country Albums (Official Charts)	6
UK Album Downloads (Official Charts)	46
US Billboard 200	8
US Independent Albums (Billboard)	2
US Top Country Albums (Billboard)	2

=== Year-end charts ===
==== Macon ====
2022 year-end chart performance for Macon
Chart (2022)	Position
US Top Country Albums (Billboard)	32

==== Georgia ====
2022 year-end chart performance for Georgia
Chart (2022)	Position
US Top Country Albums (Billboard)	57
