= Glory Days (Gabby Barrett song) =

Single by Gabby Barrett

from the album Chapter & Verse
- Released: June 12, 2023
- Genre: Country
- Length: 2:43
- Label: Warner Music Nashville
- Songwriters: Gabby Barrett; James McNair; Seth Mosley; Emily Weisband
- Producers: Gabby Barrett; Ross Copperman

Gabby Barrett singles chronology
"Pick Me Up" (2022)	"Glory Days" (2023)	"Dance Like No One's Watching" (2024)

Music video
- "Glory Days" on YouTube

"Glory Days" is a song by American country music singer Gabby Barrett. It was released on June 12, 2023 as the lead single from her second studio album Chapter & Verse. Barrett co-wrote the song with James McNair, Seth Mosley, and Emily Weisband, and co-produced it with Ross Copperman.

== Background ==
Barrett co-wrote the song with James McNair, Seth Mosley, and Emily Weisband. She set out to release something more upbeat, saying "[she] did not want to come out with another midtempo or ballad. It's summer, so I really was eager to release something that was uptempo and fun and make people smile." The song was written via Zoom call on March 16, 2023, with Mosley developing the foundational sound of the track which Barrett likened to Keith Urban's early work, and Weisband suggested the title, which resonated with Barrett balancing life as a mother of two and a country recording artist. Ross Copperman co-produced the track alongside Barrett, and Barrett's husband Cade Foehner played the guitar solo on the song's bridge.

== Music video ==
The music video for "Glory Days" was directed by Alexa Campbell and premiered on July 3, 2023. Barrett's family—husband Cade Foehner, daughter Baylah May, and son Augustine Boone—serve as co-stars in the video, which features scenes of personal family time.

== Charts ==
Weekly chart performance for "Glory Days"
Chart (2023–2024)	Peak position
Canada Country (Billboard)	34
US Bubbling Under Hot 100 (Billboard)	18
US Country Airplay (Billboard)	21
US Hot Country Songs (Billboard)	35

== Certifications ==
Certifications for "Glory Days"
Region	Certification	Certified units/sales
United States (RIAA)	Gold	500,000^{‡}
^{‡} Sales+streaming figures based on certification alone.
