= Stick That in Your Country Song =

2020 single by Eric Church

Single by Eric Church

from the album Heart
- Released: June 25, 2020
- Genre: Country rock
- Length: 3:48
- Label: EMI Nashville; BigEC
- Songwriters: Jeffrey Steele; Davis Naish
- Producer: Jay Joyce

Eric Church singles chronology
"Does to Me" (2020)	"Stick That in Your Country Song" (2020)	"Hell of a View" (2020)

"Stick That in Your Country Song" is a song written by Jeffrey Steele and Davis Naish, and recorded by American country music artist Eric Church. It was released on June 25, 2020 as the lead single for Church's seventh studio album Heart. It was nominated for the Grammy Award for Best Country Solo Performance.

== Content ==
The song was written by Jeffrey Steele and Davis Naish. In it, Church addresses several social issues and situations including underprivileged lives in urban centers, a soldier coming back from war, and an overworked and underpaid school teacher.

== Chart performance ==
"Stick That in Your Country Song" debuted and peaked at number 22 on the Billboard Country Airplay chart for the week dated July 4, 2020, making it Church's highest debut to date.

== Charts ==
=== Weekly charts ===
Chart (2020)	Peak position
Australia Country Hot 50 (TMN)	17
Canada Hot 100 (Billboard)	76
Canada Country (Billboard)	14
US Billboard Hot 100	92
US Country Airplay (Billboard)	22
US Hot Country Songs (Billboard)	23

=== Year-end charts ===
Chart (2020)	Position
US Hot Country Songs (Billboard)	79

=== Certifications ===
Region	Certification	Certified units/sales
Canada (Music Canada)	Gold	40,000^{‡}
^{‡} Sales+streaming figures based on certification alone.
