= Gabby Barrett =

American country singer (born 2000)

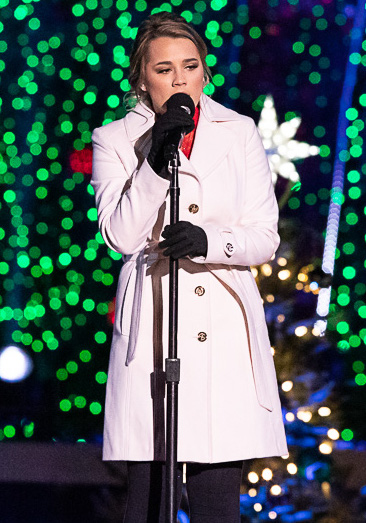
- Barrett in 2018

Background information
- Born: Gabby Bernadette Barrett; March 5, 2000 (age 26); Munhall, Pennsylvania, U.S.
- Genres: Country; country pop
- Occupations: Singer; songwriter
- Instruments: Vocals
- Years active: 2018–present
- Label: Warner Music Nashville
- Spouse: Cade Foehner (m. 2019)
- Children: 3
- Website: gabbybarrett.com

Gabrielle Bernadette Barrett (born March 5, 2000) is an American country music singer. She finished third on the sixteenth season of American Idol. Her debut single "I Hope" was the first top 10 Hot Country Songs debut by an unaccompanied woman singer since October 2017. It became a top three hit on the Billboard Hot 100 and has been certified 9× platinum by the RIAA. Her debut album Goldmine was released on June 19, 2020.

== Early life ==
Barrett is one of eight children born to Blaise and Pam Barrett. She attended Serra Catholic High School in McKeesport, Pennsylvania southeast of Pittsburgh but transferred to being an online student at Pennsylvania Cyber Charter School.

She began singing at nine and doing shows at eleven. In 2014, she won the Kean Quest Talent Search. At 14, her father encouraged her to sing in an all-black choir, which prompted her to join the Lamb of God Christian Ministries group in Homestead, Pennsylvania close to McKeesport.

== Career ==
=== 2017–2018: American Idol, post-Idol ===
Barrett auditioned for the sixteenth season of American Idol in Nashville, Tennessee. She advanced to the final before being voted off.

American Idol season 16 performances and results
Episode	Theme	Song choice	Original artist	Order	Result
Audition	Auditioner's Choice	"Good Girl" "His Eye Is on the Sparrow"	Carrie Underwood; Ethel Waters	N/A	Advanced
Top 24 Solo/Duet	Contestant's Choice	"My Church" "Stay" (with Sugarland)	Maren Morris; Sugarland	11	Advanced
Top 14	Contestant's Choice; Victory Song	"The Climb" "Little Red Wagon"	Miley Cyrus; Audra Mae	14; 6	Safe
Top 10	Disney	"Colors of the Wind"	Vanessa Williams	6	Safe
Top 7	Prince; Year You Were Born	"How Come U Don't Call Me Anymore?" "I Hope You Dance"	Prince; Lee Ann Womack	10; 2	Safe
Top 5	Carrie Underwood; Mother's Day	"Last Name" "I Have Nothing"	Carrie Underwood; Whitney Houston	2; 6	Safe
Finale	Winner's Single; Reprise Song; Hometown Decision	"Rivers Deep" "Little Red Wagon" "Don't Stop Believin'"	Gabby Barrett; Miranda Lambert; Journey	2; 5; 8	3rd Place

=== 2019–2021: Goldmine ===
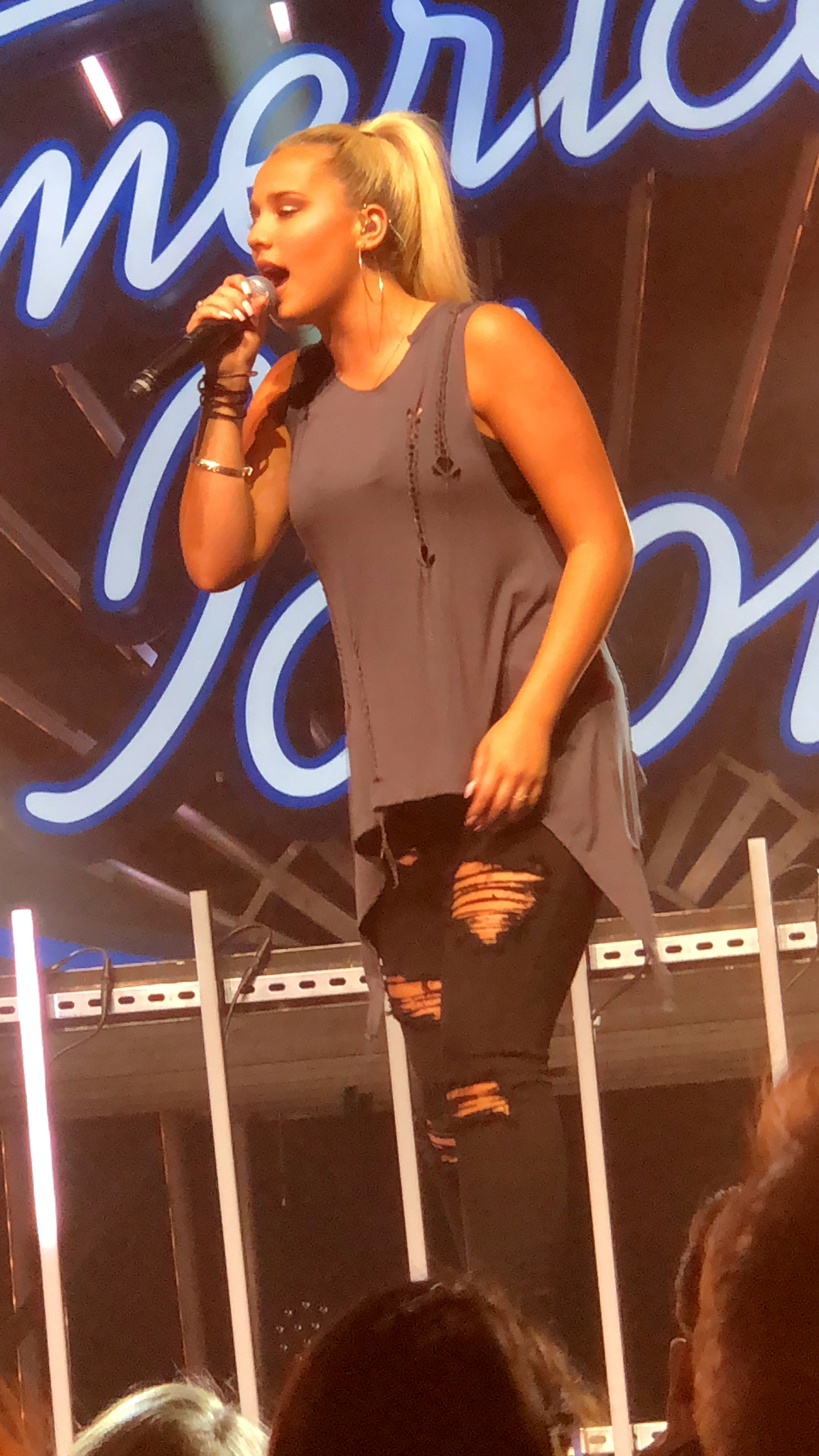
Barrett singing during American Idol Live! 2018

In 2019, Barrett independently released "I Hope", which was co-written by Jon Nite and Zachary Kale and co-produced by Zachary Kale and Ross Copperman. She performed the song in an appearance on the seventeenth season of American Idol in May 2019. The song attracted the attention of music labels, and Barrett announced on stage after the performance she had signed with Warner Music Nashville. "I Hope" was then officially released as a single by the label on June 27, 2019. The single topped Billboard's Country Streaming Songs chart as well as the Country Airplay chart in April 2020, followed by the Hot Country Songs chart. On April 7, 2020, a version featuring Charlie Puth was released. In 2019, Barrett opened for Toby Keith in Ohio, as well as Keith Urban.

On November 21, 2020, the single hit number three on the Billboard Hot 100, making her the first female country artist to do so since Taylor Swift. Puth has also been credited for the song on the Hot 100, which makes it his fourth top-ten single. As of January 2021, the single has been number one for 25 weeks on the Hot Country Songs chart.

Her debut album Goldmine was released on June 19, 2020. The album earned 15.98 million on-demand streams in its opening week, breaking the record for the largest streaming week ever for a debut country album by a woman. In 2021, Barrett opened up for Thomas Rhett on his Center Point Road Tour, and for the Zac Brown Band at Summerfest as part of their The Comeback Tour.

Along with performing at a Pittsburgh Pirates' game, she sang the national anthem for the Pittsburgh Steelers and at the Daytona 500. The song on the show selected for her if she won was "Rivers Deep." Carrie Underwood was quoted as saying that Barrett is further along than she was at her age.

In September 2021, Barrett was nominated for four 55th Annual Country Music Association Awards: Female Vocalist of the Year, Single of the Year ("The Good Ones"), Song of the Year ("The Good Ones"), and New Artist of the Year.

A deluxe edition of Goldmine was released on November 19, 2021.

=== 2023–present: Chapter & Verse ===
On June 12, 2023, she released "Glory Days", the lead single off her second studio album Chapter & Verse, which was released on February 2, 2024.

On February 8, 2026, Barrett performed at Turning Point USA's All-American Halftime Show alongside Kid Rock, Lee Brice, and Brantley Gilbert, performing "I Hope" and "The Good Ones".

== Personal life ==
Barrett married fellow Idol contestant Cade Foehner on October 5, 2019.

Barrett gave birth to their first child, a daughter, on January 18, 2021. Barrett gave birth to their second child, a son, on October 27, 2022. On August 30, 2023, Barrett announced that she was expecting their third child. Barrett gave birth to their third child, a daughter, on February 17, 2024.

== Discography ==
=== Albums ===
Title	Details	Peak chart positions			Certifications
Title	Details	US	US Country	CAN	Certifications
Goldmine	Release date: June 19, 2020; Label: Warner Music Nashville; Format: CD, digital download, LP, streaming	27	4	53	RIAA: Platinum; MC: Platinum
Chapter & Verse	Release date: February 2, 2024; Label: Warner Music Nashville; Format: CD, digital download, LP, streaming	—	39	—	
Carols and Candlelight	Release date: November 8, 2024; Label: Warner Music Nashville; Format: CD, digital download, LP, streaming	—	—	—	

=== Singles ===
Year	Title	Peak chart positions							Sales	Certifications	Album
Year	Title	US	US Country Songs	US Country Airplay	CAN	CAN Country	UK	WW	Sales	Certifications	Album
2019	"I Hope" (solo or remix featuring Charlie Puth)	3	1	1	10	2	84	77	US: 351,000; CAN: 37,000	RIAA: 9× Platinum; BPI: Gold; MC: 8× Platinum; RMNZ: Platinum	Goldmine (Note: "Pick Me Up" is featured on the deluxe edition of Goldmine that was released on November 19, 2021.)
2020	"The Good Ones"	19	1	1	41	3	—	96	US: 19,000	RIAA: 5× Platinum; MC: 3× Platinum; RMNZ: Gold	Goldmine
2021	"Footprints on the Moon"	—	— (Note: "Footprints on the Moon" did not enter the Hot Country Songs, but peaked at number 25 on the Country Digital Song Sales component chart.)	48	—	—	—	—			Goldmine
2022	"Pick Me Up"	55	14	6	—	14	—	—		RIAA: Platinum; MC: Gold	Goldmine
2023	"Glory Days"	— (Note: "Glory Days" did not enter the Billboard Hot 100, but peaked at number 18 on the Bubbling Under Hot 100 chart.)	35	21	—	34	—	—		RIAA: Gold	Chapter & Verse
2024	"Dance Like No One's Watching"	—	—	—	—	—	—	—			Chapter & Verse
2024	"Jesus on a Train"	—	—	—	—	—	—	—			Chapter & Verse
2025	"The Easy Part"	—	—	—	—	—	—	—			TBD
"—" denotes a release that did not chart.

=== Promotional singles ===
Year	Title	Peak chart positions			Album
Year	Title	US	US Country Songs	CAN AC	Album
2020	"Hall of Fame"	—	—	—	Goldmine
2020	"Got Me" (featuring Shane & Shane)	—	—	—	Goldmine
2020	"The First Noel"	78	14	33	—N/a
2023	"Cowboy Back"	—	—	—	Chapter & Verse
2023	"Growin' Up Raising You"	—	—	—	Chapter & Verse
2024	"You're My Texas"	—	—	—	Chapter & Verse
"—" denotes a release that did not chart.

=== Music videos ===
Year	Video	Director
2019	"I Hope"	Taylor Kelly
2019	"The Good Ones"	Taylor Kelly/Brian Vaughan
2021	"Footprints on the Moon"	Gus Black
2022	"Pick Me Up"	Alexa Campbell
2023	"Glory Days"	Alexa Campbell
2024	"Dance Like No One's Watching"	Josh Gicker

== Tours ==
Supporting

- That's Country Bro! Tour (2019) with Toby Keith
- Center Point Road Tour (2021) with Thomas Rhett
- The Comeback Tour (2021) with Zac Brown Band (one show)
- Rock N' Roll Cowboy Tour (2022) with Jason Aldean

== Awards and nominations ==
Year	Award show	Category	Nominated work	Result
2020	CMT Music Awards	Breakthrough Video of the Year	"I Hope"	Won
2020	Academy of Country Music Awards	New Female Artist of the Year	Gabby Barrett	Nominated
2020	Country Music Association Awards	New Artist of the Year	Gabby Barrett	Nominated
2020	Country Music Association Awards	Single of the Year	"I Hope"	Nominated
2020	American Music Awards	Favorite Female Artist – Country	Gabby Barrett	Nominated
2021	Academy of Country Music Awards	New Female Artist of the Year	Gabby Barrett	Won
2021	Academy of Country Music Awards	Single of the Year	"I Hope"	Nominated
2021	Billboard Music Awards	Top New Artist	Gabby Barrett	Nominated
2021	Billboard Music Awards	Top Country Artist	Gabby Barrett	Nominated
2021	Billboard Music Awards	Top Female Country Artist	Gabby Barrett	Won
2021	Billboard Music Awards	Top Hot 100 Song	"I Hope" (with Charlie Puth)	Nominated
2021	Billboard Music Awards	Top Radio Song	"I Hope" (with Charlie Puth)	Nominated
2021	Billboard Music Awards	Top Selling Song	"I Hope" (with Charlie Puth)	Nominated
2021	Billboard Music Awards	Top Collaboration	"I Hope" (with Charlie Puth)	Won
2021	Billboard Music Awards	Top Country Song	"I Hope" (with Charlie Puth)	Won
2021	Billboard Music Awards	Top Country Album	Goldmine	Nominated
2021	iHeartRadio Music Awards	Best New Country Artist	Gabby Barrett	Won
2021	iHeartRadio Music Awards	Country Song of the Year	"I Hope"	Nominated
2021	iHeartRadio Music Awards	Best Collaboration	"I Hope" (with Charlie Puth)	Nominated
2021	iHeartRadio Titanium Awards	1 Billion Total Audience Spins on iHeartRadio Stations	"I Hope" (with Charlie Puth)	Won
2021	CMT Music Awards	Female Video of the Year	"The Good Ones"	Won
2021	Country Music Association Awards	New Artist of the Year	Gabby Barrett	Nominated
2021	Country Music Association Awards	Female Vocalist of the Year	Gabby Barrett	Nominated
2021	Country Music Association Awards	Single of the Year	"The Good Ones"	Nominated
2021	Country Music Association Awards	Song of the Year	"The Good Ones"	Nominated
2021	American Music Awards	Favorite Female Country Artist	Gabby Barrett	Nominated
2021	American Music Awards	Favorite Country Album	Goldmine	Won
2021	American Music Awards	Favorite Country Song	"The Good Ones"	Won
2022	Academy of Country Music Awards	Female Artist of the Year	Gabby Barrett	Nominated
2022	iHeartRadio Music Awards	Country Song of the Year	"The Good Ones"	Nominated
2022	CMT Music Awards	Female Video of the Year	"Footprints on the Moon"	Nominated
2024	People's Choice Awards	The Female Country Artist of the Year	Gabby Barrett	Nominated
