= Chapter & Verse (Gabby Barrett album) =

Studio album by Gabby Barrett
- Released: February 2, 2024
- Genre: Country
- Length: 44:02
- Label: Warner Music Nashville
- Producer: Gabby Barrett; Ross Copperman

Gabby Barrett chronology
Goldmine (2020)	Chapter & Verse (2024)	Carols and Candlelight (2024)

Singles from Chapter & Verse
- 1. "Glory Days" Released: June 12, 2023; 2. "Dance Like No One's Watching" Released: April 8, 2024; 3. "Jesus on a Train" Released: October 14, 2024

Chapter & Verse is the second studio album from American country music singer Gabby Barrett. The album was released on February 2, 2024, via Warner Music Nashville.

== Background ==
The title Chapter & Verse was inspired by Barrett's faith, and she co-wrote nine of the album's 14 tracks and co-produced the project with Ross Copperman. Phil Wickham is featured on the closing track, and Luke Combs lends background vocals to "Dance Like No One's Watching", a song Combs co-wrote about being the parent to a daughter. He gave it to Barrett after discovering his wife was expecting a boy, knowing that Barrett had just given birth to a girl.

"Glory Days" was released as the album's lead single on June 12, 2023. "Cowboy Back", "Growin' Up Raising You", and "You're My Texas" were all issued as promotional singles leading up to the album release. Barrett co-wrote the latter track as a tribute to her Texan husband Cade Foehner, with Miranda Lambert who also hails from East Texas. "Dance Like No One's Watching" was released as the second single from the album on April 8, 2024. "Jesus on a Train" was released on October 14, 2024, as the album's third single, and Barrett's first single to the Christian radio format.

== Track listing ==
Chapter & Verse track listing
No.	Title	Writer(s)	Length
1.	"The Chapter"	Gabby Barrett; Ross Copperman; Hillary Lindsey; Jon Nite	3:32
2.	"Cowboy Back"	Barrett; Jesse Frasure; Nite	3:11
3.	"Dance Like No One's Watching"	Luke Combs; James McNair; Emily Weisband	3:51
4.	"Glory Days"	Barrett; McNair; Seth Mosley; Weisband	2:42
5.	"Had It All"	Barrett; Copperman; Lindsey; Nite	3:47
6.	"Hard to Read"	Barrett; Nite; Josh Thompson	3:22
7.	"Growin' Up Raising You"	Barrett; Zachary Kale; Nite; Jimmy Robbins	3:17
8.	"Off the Highway"	Barrett; McNair; Mosley; Weisband	2:58
9.	"You're My Texas"	Barrett; Miranda Lambert; Lindsey	3:22
10.	"Jesus on a Train"	Barrett; Copperman; Shane McAnally; Josh Osborne	2:49
11.	"Grow Apart"	Sam Bergeson; Lydia Vaughn; Weisband	3:29
12.	"God, Money & Love"	Phil Barton; Corey Crowder; Lori McKenna	3:22
13.	"All of My Life"	Josh Miller; Nite; Jordan Reynolds	2:59
14.	"The Verse: Doxology (Amen)" (featuring Phil Wickham)	Louis Bourgeois; Thomas Ken; Phil Wickham	1:24
Total length:			44:02

== Personnel ==
Musicians

- Gabby Barrett – lead vocals
- Ilya Toshinskiy – acoustic guitar (tracks 1–3, 6–8, 12, 13), electric guitar (1, 8, 13), mandolin (8), Dobro (13)
- Ross Copperman – background vocals (tracks 1, 3, 4, 6, 7, 9–11, 13), programming (1–4, 9, 13), keyboards (2)
- Fred Eltringham – drums (tracks 1–4, 6, 7, 9, 12), percussion (1, 3, 6, 7)
- Lex Price – bass guitar (tracks 1–4, 6, 7, 12)
- Dan Dugmore – pedal steel guitar (tracks 1–4, 6, 7, 12)
- Rob Mcnelley – electric guitar (tracks 1–4, 6, 12)
- Hillary Lindsey – background vocals (track 1)
- Jon Nite – background vocals (tracks 2, 6, 7)
- Alex Wright – synthesizer (tracks 2, 6, 7), Hammond B3 organ (2), keyboards (3), piano (6, 7, 12)
- Jenee Fleenor – fiddle (track 2)
- Jesse Frasure – percussion, synthesizer (track 2)
- Luke Combs – background vocals (track 3)
- Ben Foster – electric guitar, keyboards (track 3)
- Danny Rader – acoustic guitar, electric guitar (tracks 4, 5, 9–11); programming (4, 5, 9, 10), percussion (5, 9–11), bass guitar (5, 10); bouzouki, drums, synthesizer (5); keyboards (9); fiddle, Hammond organ, pedal steel guitar, piano, Wurlitzer (10)
- Emily Weisband – background vocals (tracks 4, 8, 11)
- Jeff Roach – programming (tracks 4, 8, 11), keyboards (4)
- Seth Mosley – acoustic guitar, programming (track 4)
- Cade Foehner – electric guitar (track 4)
- Emma-Lee – background vocals (track 5)
- Jimmy Robbins – strings (track 7)
- Tony Lucido – bass guitar (tracks 8, 9, 13)
- Nir Z – drums, percussion (track 8)
- Trannie Anderson – background vocals (track 12)
- Chas Covington – bass guitar (track 13)
- Dave Cohen – piano (track 13)
- Phil Wickham – vocals (track 14)

Technical

- Gabby Barrett – production
- Ross Copperman – production (all tracks), additional engineering (tracks 2, 7)
- Andrew Mendelson – mastering
- Dave Clauss – mixing
- Buckley Miller – recording, editing
- Danny Rader – recording (track 4)
- Jeff Roach – recording (track 4)
- Seth Mosley – recording (track 4)
- Justin Cortelyou – editing
- Sean Badum – recording assistance (tracks 1–11, 13), additional engineering (2, 7)

== Charts ==
Weekly chart performance for Chapter & Verse
Chart (2024)	Peak position
US Top Country Albums (Billboard)	39
