= All Night (Brothers Osborne song) =

Single by Brothers Osborne

from the album Skeletons
- Released: May 18, 2020
- Genre: Country
- Length: 3:12
- Label: EMI Nashville
- Songwriters: T.J. Osborne; John Osborne; Andrew DeRoberts
- Producer: Jay Joyce

Brothers Osborne singles chronology
"I Don't Remember Me (Before You)" (2018)	"All Night" (2020)	"I'm Not for Everyone" (2021)

"All Night" is a song recorded by American country music duo Brothers Osborne. It is the lead single to their third studio album Skeletons. The duo's members, T.J. Osborne and John Osborne, wrote the song with Andrew DeRoberts.

== Content ==
The duo's two members, T.J. Osborne and John Osborne, wrote the song with Andrew DeRoberts, and Jay Joyce produced the track. Describing the song to The Country Daily, John said, "We wanted to write a song that just felt good. We didn’t want to think too hard about it. We wanted to write a song that no matter what happened we knew that our fans at our shows were gonna love to sing along to, and that’s what we did”. The duo also performed the song at the 2020 Country Music Association telecast.

== Music video ==
The song's music video, released on September 30, 2020, was directed by Wes Edwards and Ryan Silver, both of whom have directed most of the brothers' other music videos. In it, a man is depicted sitting at home when he receives a package that features life-sized dancing puppets. This is alternated with scenes of the duo performing the song while under a blacklight, as the puppets appear around them with neon skeletons painted on.

== Charts ==
=== Weekly charts ===
Weekly chart performance for "All Night"
Chart (2020–2021)	Peak position
Canada Hot 100 (Billboard)	68
Canada Country (Billboard)	4
US Bubbling Under Hot 100 (Billboard)	9
US Country Airplay (Billboard)	25
US Hot Country Songs (Billboard)	25

=== Year-end charts ===
Year-end chart performance for "All Night"
Chart (2021)	Position
US Hot Country Songs (Billboard)	91

== Certifications ==
Region	Certification	Certified units/sales
Canada (Music Canada)	Platinum	80,000^{‡}
^{‡} Sales+streaming figures based on certification alone.
