= Pick Me Up (Gabby Barrett song) =

Single by Gabby Barrett

from the album Goldmine
- Released: February 7, 2022
- Genre: Country
- Length: 2:49
- Label: Warner Music Nashville
- Songwriters: Gabby Barrett; Jon Nite; Ross Copperman
- Producers: Ross Copperman; Zach Kale

Gabby Barrett singles chronology
"Footprints on the Moon" (2021)	"Pick Me Up" (2022)	"Glory Days" (2023)

Music video
- "Pick Me Up" on YouTube

"Pick Me Up" is a song recorded by American country music singer Gabby Barrett. It serves as the fourth single from her debut album Goldmine. Barrett co-wrote the song with Jon Nite and Ross Copperman. The official music video for the song premiered on May 5, 2022.

== Background ==
On November 19, 2021, Barrett released the deluxe edition to her debut album Goldmine. The song is one of four new tracks added to the extended version and serves as the fourth single. In a press release by Warner Music Nashville, Barrett said that she did not really have a song in her repertoire that was laid-back-Country – "a riding down the backroads while listening to George Strait-type of song."

== Critical reception ==
Jess from Taste of Country said that the song is "both nostalgic and comforting. Like most backroad songs, it feels as if the song itself is taking the wheel and we're all just along for the ride." Chad Carlson from Today's Country Magazine praised the song and said that it "will undoubtedly be another hit for Gabby, as it showcases her vocal range and flexibility, while touching home on a familiar topic but adding her own spice and flavor that only she can do."

== Music video ==
Directed by Alexa Campbell and featuring Barrett's husband, Cade Foehner, the video showcases the journey of a couple as young adults to their elderly years. The country singer admits that she cried once she saw the music video for the first time. "This one just touches my heart in a very special way."

== Charts ==
=== Weekly charts ===
Weekly chart performance for "Pick Me Up"
Chart (2022–2023)	Peak position
Canada Country (Billboard)	14
US Billboard Hot 100	55
US Country Airplay (Billboard)	6
US Hot Country Songs (Billboard)	14

=== Year-end charts ===
2022 year-end chart performance for "Pick Me Up"
Chart (2022)	Position
US Country Airplay (Billboard)	49
US Hot Country Songs (Billboard)	20

2023 year-end chart performance for "Pick Me Up"
Chart (2023)	Position
US Country Airplay (Billboard)	47
US Hot Country Songs (Billboard)	70

== Certifications ==
Certifications for "Pick Me Up"
Region	Certification	Certified units/sales
Canada (Music Canada)	Gold	40,000^{‡}
United States (RIAA)	Platinum	1,000,000^{‡}
^{‡} Sales+streaming figures based on certification alone.
