= I Hope (Gabby Barrett song) =

2019 debut single by Gabby Barrett

Single by Gabby Barrett

from the album Goldmine
- Released: July 29, 2019
- Genre: Country pop
- Length: 3:30
- Label: Warner Music Nashville
- Songwriters: Gabby Barrett; Zach Kale; Jon Nite
- Producers: Zach Kale; Ross Copperman

Gabby Barrett singles chronology
"I Hope" (2019)	"The Good Ones" (2020)

Charlie Puth singles chronology
"Cheating on You" (2019)	"I Hope" (2020)	"Summer Feelings" (2020)

Music video
- "I Hope" on YouTube

"I Hope" is a song recorded by American country music singer Gabby Barrett. She released the single independently following her third-place finish on season 16 of American Idol. It led to her signing a deal with Warner Music Nashville, and it was released on July 29, 2019, as her debut single and the first from her debut studio album Goldmine. Barrett co-wrote the song with Jon Nite and Zach Kale, with Kale and Ross Copperman handling production.

A remix featuring American singer-songwriter Charlie Puth was released on April 17, 2020. It received a Country Music Association Award for Single of the Year nomination at the 54th Annual Country Music Association Awards. The song reached number three in the US and number ten in Canada. The song is certified 9× Platinum in the United States, 8× Platinum in Canada, Platinum in New Zealand, and Gold in the United Kingdom. It has also been hailed as a crossover hit, topping the Billboard Country Airplay, Adult Pop Songs and all-format Radio Songs charts and becoming the best-selling country song of 2020 in the United States, as well as the third-bestselling country and adult contemporary song of 2021 in the country. It spent 62 weeks on the Billboard Hot 100.

== Background ==
Gabby Barrett co-wrote "I Hope" with Zach Kale and Jon Nite, and the track was produced by Ross Copperman and Zachary Kale. Barrett revealed that she "had a terrible relationship in high school that just went south, and [she] ended up getting [her] heart broken." They originally sat down to write a song about a woman suffering a breakup and still wishing for her ex to be happy, but Barrett decided to turn it toward a more revengeful nature: "The fact is that sometimes we hope for the worst when it comes to our exes. We would never voice that, but it wreaks [havoc] inside. This song now says the things that maybe you or I never said."

== Remix ==
After the single reached number one and its popularity on streaming services began to skyrocket, American singer-songwriter Charlie Puth messaged Barrett on Instagram expressing how much he loved the song and wanted to remix it. Though Barrett didn't quite believe it was really Puth, once she agreed, there was a quick turnaround in creating the new version, with Puth adding vocals to the song's second verse and including a more pop-leaning production. The remix helped catapult the song into the all-genre Billboard Hot 100 and became one of the biggest crossover hits in 2020.

== Critical reception ==
In a review for Goldmine, Bob Paxton of Sounds Like Nashville called the song "the anthem for every heartbroken girl" and praised the songwriters for exploring a "new angle on the "woman scorned" theme." Markos Papadatos of Digital Journal wrote that Barrett "is able to convey a wide range of raw emotions" in the song and that "I Hope" proves she has "everything it takes to become the next big female star in the country genre." Mike Wass of Idolator wrote that "I Hope" is the "rowdiest, most biting country breakup anthem since Carrie Underwood's "Before He Cheats"."

== Music video ==
The music video for "I Hope" was filmed in Nashville, Tennessee and premiered on February 7, 2019. In the video, Barrett sits alone in a warehouse, reflecting on experiences with her ex through a series of flashbacks.

== Live performances ==
Barrett returned to the American Idol stage to give her first televised performance of "I Hope" on May 5, 2019.

Barrett performed the song live at the 54th Annual Country Music Association Awards alongside Charlie Puth that was televised on November 11, 2020.

== Commercial performance ==
"I Hope" debuted at number 74 on the Billboard Hot 100 for the chart dated January 11, 2020, and peaked at number three, on the chart dated November 21, 2020, becoming Barrett's first top-ten entry on the Hot 100 and Puth's fourth top 10 (Puth is given a featured artist credit on the chart from the issue dated October 3, 2020, as overall consumption for the remix outpaced that of the Barrett-only original). Reaching the top five in its 45th week on the chart, "I Hope" broke the record for the longest ascent to the top five in Billboard history, surpassing the previous record set by "Radioactive" by Imagine Dragons, which took 42 weeks to reach the top five. It also reached No. 1 on the Country Streaming Songs chart on April 11, 2019, with 9 million U.S. streams for the week, which made Barrett the first woman to score a No. 1 on that chart with her debut single. It also reached No. 1 on Billboard Country Airplay for the chart dated April 25, 2020, and No. 1 on Billboard Hot Country Songs for the chart dated July 25, 2020, making it the first female debut single to top the latter chart since 2006. Additionally, it replaced Maren Morris's "The Bones" at number one, making it the first time since 2011 that two back-to-back solo female artists topped the chart. "I Hope" became only the fourth song in history to top both the Country Radio Airplay and all-format Radio Songs chart, and its record 20-week run atop the Hot Country Songs chart made Barrett the first female solo artist to remain at the summit for that long.

"I Hope" was certified nine times platinum by the RIAA in 2026. The song has sold 351,000 copies in the United States as of December 2020.

The song topped Billboard's year-end Hot Country Songs chart for 2020, making Barrett the first female artist to achieve this since Wynonna Judd with "I Saw the Light" in 1992.

== Charts ==
=== Weekly charts ===
Chart performance for "I Hope" (solo or featuring Charlie Puth)
Chart (2019–2021)	Peak position
Belgium (Ultratip Bubbling Under Wallonia)	18
Canada Hot 100 (Billboard)	10
Canada AC (Billboard)	1
Canada CHR/Top 40 (Billboard)	7
Canada Country (Billboard)	2
Canada Hot AC (Billboard)	2
Global 200 (Billboard)	77
Iceland (Tónlistinn)	15
Ireland (IRMA)	95
Romania (Airplay 100)	75
UK Singles (OCC)	84
US Billboard Hot 100	3
US Adult Contemporary (Billboard)	2
US Adult Pop Airplay (Billboard)	1
US Country Airplay (Billboard)	1
US Hot Country Songs (Billboard)	1
US Dance/Mix Show Airplay (Billboard)	24
US Pop Airplay (Billboard)	3
US Rolling Stone Top 100	9

=== Year-end charts ===
Year-end chart positions for "I Hope" (solo or featuring Charlie Puth)
Chart (2019)	Position
US Hot Country Songs (Billboard)	73

Chart (2020)	Position
Canada (Canadian Hot 100)	96
US Billboard Hot 100	12
US Adult Contemporary (Billboard)	16
US Adult Top 40 (Billboard)	15
US Country Airplay (Billboard)	12
US Hot Country Songs (Billboard)	1
US Mainstream Top 40 (Billboard)	24

Chart (2021)	Position
Canada (Canadian Hot 100)	27
US Billboard Hot 100	40
US Adult Contemporary (Billboard)	3
US Adult Top 40 (Billboard)	19
US Hot Country Songs (Billboard)	3
US Mainstream Top 40 (Billboard)	47

== Certifications ==
Region	Certification	Certified units/sales
Canada (Music Canada)	8× Platinum	640,000^{‡}
New Zealand (RMNZ)	Platinum	30,000^{‡}
United Kingdom (BPI)	Gold	400,000^{‡}
United States (RIAA)	9× Platinum	9,000,000^{‡}
^{‡} Sales+streaming figures based on certification alone.

== Release history ==
Region	Date	Format	Version	Label
United States	January 25, 2019	Digital download	Original	—N/a
United States	July 29, 2019	Country radio	Original	Warner Music Nashville
United States	April 17, 2020	Digital download	Remix featuring Charlie Puth	Warner Music Nashville
United States	May 11, 2020	Hot adult contemporary radio	Remix featuring Charlie Puth	Warner Music Nashville
United States	June 9, 2020	Contemporary hit radio	Remix featuring Charlie Puth	Warner Music Nashville
United States	July 26, 2021	Adult contemporary radio	Original	Warner Music Nashville
