= Younger Me =

Song by Brothers Osborne

from the album Skeletons
- Released: February 2021
- Genre: Country rock
- Length: 3:36
- Label: EMI Nashville
- Songwriters: T.J. Osborne; John Osborne; Kendell Marvel
- Producer: Jay Joyce

"Younger Me" is a song by American country music duo Brothers Osborne. Initially released as a promotional single in 2021, it was added in 2022 as a bonus track to the deluxe edition of the duo's third studio album, 2020's Skeletons.

== Content ==
In February 2021, Brothers Osborne lead vocalist T.J. Osborne came out as gay. He wrote the song about his experiences with his own sexuality, framing the lyrics as encouragement that he wished to give to his younger self. While initially released solely as a promotional single and music video, "Younger Me" was added as a bonus track to a late-2021 release of the duo's third studio album, Skeletons.

Taste of Country writer Angela Stefano describes the song as having an "'80s vibe" with synthesizers and guitars played by T.J.'s brother John, the other half of the duo. John's wife, Lucie Silvas, provides backing vocals. The song's corresponding music video, filmed in black and white, features the duo performing the song on the steps of the Tennessee State Capitol in Nashville, Tennessee.

== Accolades ==
Brothers Osborne performed the song at the 55th Annual Country Music Association Awards, where it was nominated for Video of the Year. In March 2022, "Younger Me" won the Grammy Award for Best Country Duo/Group Performance at the 64th Annual Grammy Awards, the first win for the duo following seven previous nominations.
