= Goldmine (album) =

Studio album by Gabby Barrett
- Released: June 19, 2020
- Genre: Country pop
- Length: 40:27
- Label: Warner Music Nashville
- Producer: Ross Copperman; Zach Kale; Jimmy Robbins; Sam Martin; Bryan Fowler

Gabby Barrett chronology
Goldmine (2020)	Chapter & Verse (2024)

Singles from Goldmine
- 1. "I Hope" Released: July 29, 2019; 2. "The Good Ones" Released: June 8, 2020; 3. "Footprints on the Moon" Released: June 28, 2021

Goldmine is the debut studio album from American country music singer Gabby Barrett. It was released on June 19, 2020, through Warner Music Nashville. It is certified Platinum in the United States and Canada.

== Content ==
Barrett told the blog Sounds Like Nashville that she had begun writing songs for the album in 2018 and 2019, with lead single "I Hope" having been written in late 2018. Pop singer Charlie Puth, after hearing the song, contacted Barrett on Instagram and offered to remix it with his own vocals. "I Hope" reached No. 1 on the Billboard Country Airplay chart dated April 25, 2020, and also topped the Billboard Country Streaming Songs chart, which made Barrett the first woman to score a No. 1 on that chart with her debut single. The song became a crossover hit after reaching the summit of the Billboard Country Airplay, Adult Pop Songs and all-format Radio Songs charts. It peaked at number three on the US Billboard Hot 100, broke the record for the longest climb to the top five, and spent a total of 62 weeks on the chart. It reached number ten in Canada. It is certified seven-times platinum in the US and eight-times platinum in Canada.

Ross Copperman and Zach Kale produced the entire album, with assistance on some tracks from Jimmy Robbins, Sam Martin, and Bryan Fowler. Contemporary Christian duo Shane & Shane are featured on "Got Me".

"The Good Ones" was released on June 8, 2020, as the album's second single. It became Barrett's second number one hit on the Billboard Country Airplay chart, where it spent three weeks at the top, marking the longest run at number one for a female artist since Miranda Lambert's "The House That Built Me" in 2010. It peaked at number 19 on the Billboard Hot 100. It is certified triple platinum in both the US and Canada.

"Footprints on the Moon" was released as the album's third single on June 28, 2021. It reached a peak of number 48 on the Billboard Country Airplay chart.

== Critical reception ==
Stephen Thomas Erlewine of AllMusic found the album's sound "draped in a digital gloss designed to appeal to a number of different demographics". He also thought that Barrett's presence as a cowriter on all but one song helped to establish her musical identity. Brian Mansfield gave the album a largely positive review for Variety, comparing Barrett's vocals favorably to those of Carrie Underwood while also praising the hooks written in songs such as "The Good Ones" and "Hall of Fame".

== Commercial performance ==
Goldmine debuted at number four on the Billboard Top Country Albums chart, earning 20,000 equivalent album units. The album garnered 15.98 million on-demand streams in its opening week, breaking the record for the largest streaming week ever for a debut country album by a woman. Upon its release, global first day streams of the album on Amazon Music surpassed those for any previous debut country album on the platform.

== Track listing ==
No.	Title	Writer(s)	Producers	Length
1.	"I Hope"	Gabby Barrett; Zach Kale; Jon Nite	Ross Copperman; Kale	3:31
2.	"Thank God"	Barrett; Nicolle Galyon; Nite; Jimmy Robbins	Copperman; Kale; Robbins	2:59
3.	"Write It on My Heart"	Barrett; Copperman; Josh Osborne	Copperman; Kale	3:00
4.	"Footprints on the Moon"	Barrett; Kale; Nite	Copperman; Kale	3:10
5.	"You're the Only Reason"	Barrett; Copperman; Josh Kear	Copperman; Kale	3:00
6.	"Goldmine"	Galyon; Liz Rose; Caitlyn Smith	Copperman; Kale; Sam Martin	2:42
7.	"The Good Ones"	Barrett; Kale; Emily Landis; Jim McCormick	Copperman; Kale	3:35
8.	"Jesus & My Mama"	Barrett; Kale; Marti Dodson; Cliff Downs	Copperman; Kale	3:31
9.	"Hall of Fame"	Barrett; Kale; Trannie Anderson; Adam Doleac	Copperman; Kale	3:21
10.	"Got Me" (featuring Shane & Shane)	Barrett; Kale; Shane Barnard; Cade Foehner; Bryan Fowler	Copperman; Kale; Fowler	3:56
11.	"Rose Needs a Jack"	Barrett; Joe Clemmons; Kale	Copperman; Kale; Martin	2:46
12.	"Strong"	Barrett; Copperman; Emily Weisband	Copperman; Kale	3:26
13.	"I Hope" (Remix) (with Charlie Puth)	Barrett; Kale; Nite	Copperman; Kale	3:30
Total length:				40:27

Deluxe edition
No.	Title	Writer(s)	Producers	Length
14.	"Pick Me Up"	Barrett; Copperman; Nite	Copperman; Kale	2:49
15.	"Never Get It Back"	Barrett; Copperman; Nite	Copperman; Kale	4:11
16.	"I Will Always Love You"	Dolly Parton	Copperman	4:41
17.	"The Good Ones" (Wedding Version)	Barrett; Kale; Landis; McCormick	Copperman; Kale	3:38
Total length:				57:48

== Personnel ==
Adapted from liner notes.

Vocals

- Trannie Anderson – background vocals (tracks 3, 8, 9)
- Gabby Barrett – lead vocals (all tracks), background vocals (track 12)
- Ross Copperman – background vocals (tracks 3, 5)
- Zach Kale – background vocals (all tracks except 5 & 6)
- Charlie Puth – duet vocals (track 13)
- Rozes – background vocals (tracks 4, 12)
- Shane & Shane – featuring vocals (track 10)

Musicians and production

- Jacob Arnold – drums (track 8)
- Shane Bernard – guitar (track 10)
- Ross Copperman – guitar (tracks 3, 5, 7, 12), keyboards (tracks 3, 5, 12), programming (tracks 3, 5, 6, 12)
- Adam Doleac – guitar (track 9)
- Dan Fernandez – bass guitar (track 4), guitar (track 4)
- Cade Foehner – guitar (tracks 3, 4, 8)
- Bryan Fowler – guitar (track 10), keyboards (track 10), programming (track 10)
- Jonny Fung – banjo (tracks 4, 12), bass guitar (tracks 3, 8, 9), guitar (tracks 3, 4, 8, 9, 12), programming (tracks 3, 4, 8, 9, 12)
- Caleb Gilbreath – drums (tracks 1, 13), percussion (track 4)
- Adam Griffith – guitar (tracks 6, 11)
- Zach Kale – guitar (tracks 1, 2, 4, 7–9, 11–13), keyboards (tracks 1, 4, 7–9, 13), programming (tracks 1, 2, 4, 7–13)
- Sam Martin – guitar (track 6), keyboards (tracks 6, 11), programming (tracks 6, 11)
- Buckley Miller – programming (track 9)
- Spence Peppard – guitar (track 8)
- Danny Rader – guitar (tracks 7, 13)
- Jimmy Robbins – guitar (track 2), programming (track 2)
- Derek Wells – guitar (track 1)
- Brandon Ellington — guitar (tracks 1, 4)
- Alex Wright – keyboards (all tracks except 5 & 6)
- Nir Z. – drums (tracks 4, 10)

== Charts ==
=== Weekly charts ===
Weekly chart performance for Goldmine
Chart (2020)	Peak position
Canadian Albums (Billboard)	53
US Billboard 200	27
US Top Country Albums (Billboard)	4

=== Year-end charts ===
2020 year-end chart performance for Goldmine
Chart (2020)	Position
US Billboard 200	183
US Top Country Albums (Billboard)	33

2021 year-end chart performance for Goldmine
Chart (2021)	Position
US Billboard 200	98
US Top Country Albums (Billboard)	8

2023 year-end chart performance for Goldmine
Chart (2023)	Position
US Top Country Albums (Billboard)	60

== Certifications ==
Certifications for Goldmine
Region	Certification	Certified units/sales
Canada (Music Canada)	Platinum	80,000^{‡}
United States (RIAA)	Platinum	1,000,000^{‡}
^{‡} Sales+streaming figures based on certification alone.
