= Skeletons (Brothers Osborne album) =

Studio album by Brothers Osborne
- Released: October 9, 2020
- Studio: Southern Ground Studios and Neon Cross (Nashville, Tennessee)
- Genre: Country; Rock
- Length: 39:18
- Label: EMI Nashville
- Producer: Jay Joyce

Brothers Osborne chronology
Live at the Ryman (2019)	Skeletons (2020)	Brothers Osborne (2023)

Singles from Skeltons
- 1. "All Night" Released: May 18, 2020; 2. "I'm Not for Everyone" Released: April 26, 2021

Skeletons is the third studio album by American country music duo Brothers Osborne. It was released by EMI Records Nashville on October 9, 2020. The album includes the singles "All Night" and "I'm Not for Everyone".

== Content ==
"All Night" was released to radio in 2020 as the album's lead single.

The album was re-released on January 21, 2022 with the bonus tracks "Younger Me", "Headstone", and "Midnight Rider's Prayer". "Younger Me" was released in mid-2021 as a promotional single in honor of lead singer T. J. Osborne coming out as gay earlier in the year. The track "Midnight Rider's Prayer" incorporates Willie Nelson's "On the Road Again" and thus credits Nelson as a co-writer.

== Critical reception ==
Stephen Thomas Erlewine of AllMusic rated the album 4.5 out of 5 stars, stating that "Maybe it's true that Brothers Osborne aren't quite for everyone, an admission they shrug off early on the album, but the great thing about Skeletons is how it sounds like they're appealing to wide quadrants of rock, pop, country, and Americana audiences without sounding like anything but themselves."

=== Awards and nominations ===
Skeletons was nominated for the Album of the Year award at the 55th Annual Country Music Association Awards and "Younger Me" was nominated for Video of the Year. Brothers Osborne won the Vocal Duo of the Year award based on the strength of the album. It was also nominated for the Album of the Year award at the 56th Academy of Country Music Awards.

Brothers Osborne received two nominations at the 64th Grammy Awards: Grammy Award for Best Country Album for Skeletons and Best Country Duo/Group Performance for "Younger Me." The latter won a Grammy.

== Track listing ==
No.	Title	Writer(s)	Length
1.	"Lighten Up"	John Osborne; TJ Osborne; Ian Fitchuk; Daniel Tashian	3:18
2.	"All Night"	J. Osborne; TJ Osborne; Andrew DeRoberts	2:48
3.	"All the Good Ones Are"	TJ Osborne; Lee Thomas Miller; Craig Wiseman	3:23
4.	"I'm Not for Everyone"	J. Osborne; TJ Osborne; Luke Dick; Natalie Hemby	2:52
5.	"Skeletons"	J. Osborne; TJ Osborne; DeRoberts	3:39
6.	"Back on the Bottle"	J. Osborne; TJ Osborne; Hayes Carll	3:16
7.	"High Note"	J. Osborne; TJ Osborne; Casey Beathard; Dustin Christensen	3:32
8.	"Muskrat Greene"	J. Osborne	2:35
9.	"Dead Man's Curve"	J. Osborne; TJ Osborne; Miller	2:21
10.	"Make it a Good One"	J. Osborne; TJ Osborne; Stephen Wilson Jr.	3:25
11.	"Hatin' Somebody"	J. Osborne; TJ Osborne; Beatherd	4:51
12.	"Old Man's Boots"	J. Osborne	3:18
Total length:			39:18

Skeletons — Deluxe edition bonus tracks
No.	Title	Writer(s)	Length
13.	"Younger Me"	J. Osborne; TJ Osborne; Kendell Marvel	3:36
14.	"Headstone"	J. Osborne; TJ Osborne; Marvel	4:45
15.	"Midnight Rider's Prayer"	J. Osborne; TJ Osborne; Paul Moak; Willie Nelson	2:57

== Personnel ==
Adapted from liner notes.

=== Brothers Osborne ===
- John Osborne – acoustic guitar, electric guitars, backing vocals, second lead vocal (4)
- T.J. Osborne – lead vocals, acoustic guitar, acoustic 12-string guitar

=== Additional musicians ===
- Jay Joyce – keyboards, synthesizers, programming, acoustic guitar, 5-string banjo, percussion, backing vocals
- Billy Justineau – keyboards, acoustic piano, Wurlitzer electric piano, Hammond B3 organ, accordion, 5-string banjo, handclaps, backing vocals
- Jason Graumlich – electric guitars, handclaps, backing vocals
- Pete Sternberg – bass guitar, handclaps, backing vocals
- Adam Box – drums, percussion, handclaps, backing vocals
- Gideon Klein – fiddle
- Jason Hall – handclaps, backing vocals
- Jaxon Hargrove – backing vocals
- Jimmy Mansfield – handclaps, backing vocals
- John Peets – handclaps
- Lucie Silvas – backing vocals

=== Production ===
- Brian Wright – A&R
- Jay Joyce – producer, mixing
- Jason Hall – recording, mixing
- Jaxon Hargrove – recording assistant
- Jimmy Mansfield – recording assistant
- Andrew Mendelson – mastering at Georgetown Masters (Nashville, Tennessee)
- Sarah Marie Burke – A&R production
- Court Blankenship – production coordinator
- Karen Naff – art direction, design
- John Osborne – front cover artwork
- Kera Jackson – art production
- Ricardo Alessio – illustration
- Natalie Osborne – front cover photography
- Eric Ryan Anderson – photography
- John Peets for Q Prime South – management

== Charts ==
=== Weekly charts ===
Weekly chart performance for Skeletons
Chart (2020)	Peak position
Canadian Albums (Billboard)	48
Scottish Albums (Official Charts)	28
UK Album Downloads (Official Charts)	14
UK Country Albums (Official Charts)	1
US Billboard 200	43
US Top Country Albums (Billboard)	4

=== Year-end charts ===
Year-end chart performance for Skeletons
Chart (2020)	Position
US Top Country Albums (Billboard)	99
