= If I Didn't Love You (Jason Aldean and Carrie Underwood song) =

Single by Jason Aldean and Carrie Underwood

from the album Macon, Georgia
- Released: July 23, 2021
- Studio: Treasure Isle Studios (Nashville, TN); The Conederosa (College Grove, TN); Latitude Studio South (Franklin, TN)
- Genre: Country rock
- Length: 3:32
- Label: Broken Bow; Macon; Capitol Nashville
- Songwriters: Tully Kennedy; John Morgan; Kurt Allison; Lydia Vaughan
- Producer: Michael Knox

Jason Aldean singles chronology
"Blame It on You" (2020)	"If I Didn't Love You" (2021)	"Trouble with a Heartbreak" (2022)

Carrie Underwood singles chronology
"Hallelujah" (2020)	"If I Didn't Love You" (2021)	"Ghost Story" (2022)

Music video
- "If I Didn't Love You" on YouTube

"If I Didn't Love You" is a song recorded by American country music singers Jason Aldean and Carrie Underwood, released on July 23, 2021, as the first single from the first half of Macon on Aldean's tenth studio album Macon, Georgia, of which the first half, Macon was released on November 12, 2021. The song was nominated at 64th Annual Grammy Awards for Best Country Duo/Group Performance and was recognized with the Academy of Country Music Awards for Single of the Year. The related music video won two CMT Music Awards, including Video of the Year, making Underwood the most prized in the cateogy.

Commercially, the song became the highest debut for a duet between a solo male and female artist on the Billboard Hot Country Songs, peaking at number two, reaching platinum RIAA certification.

== Background and composition ==
The song is a power ballad that describes both sides to a relationship having trouble moving on from the other. It was written by Tully Kennedy, John Morgan, Kurt Allison, and Lydia Vaughan, all members of Aldean's band and the production team New Voice Entertainment. The song came later in the album writing process, intended for a duet, with Aldean recording the song before picking out a duet partner.

Aldean's list of singing partners was small, with Underwood being at the top, and after asking her to collaborate, the song was recorded a week after, becoming the singers first collaboration. Underwood explained the importance of the collaboration to Good Morning America:

Jason asked if I would sing 'If I Didn't Love You' with him. I knew I liked the song, and Jason and I have actually been trying to do things together over the years. We've sang together before, but we've never officially recorded anything together. It just kind of felt like this could be our moment. [...] I felt like it was a little bit of an unexpected duet to other people, but I feel like I always knew at some point I'd probably sing with him officially, and this just seemed like the stars were aligning and it just seemed like it was going to be the perfect fit.

— Carrie Underwood

== Commercial performance ==
In the United States, "If I Didn't Love You" debuted at number 20 on the Billboard Country Airplay chart. The song also debuted at number two on the Hot Country Songs chart, becoming the highest debut for a duet between a solo male and female artist. It sold 29,500 downloads in its first week and drew 9 million streams during the tracking period and debuted at number 15 on the Billboard Hot 100 chart. On the chart dated October 30, 2021, the song rose to number one on the Country Airplay chart, becoming Aldean's twenty-fourth number one single on that chart, and Underwood's sixteenth, as well as her first since "Church Bells" in July 2016. It extended Underwood's record as the female artist with the most number one hits on the Country Airplay chart. The song spent a second week at number one on the Mediabase/Country Aircheck Singles chart and Billboard’s Country Airplay chart. The song fell to number two for the chart dated November 13, but returned to number one for a third and final week the following week.

== Accolades ==
=== 57th Academy of Country Music Awards ===
Year	Nominee / work	Award	Result
2022	"If I Didn't Love You"	Single of the Year	Won
2022	"If I Didn't Love You"	Musical Event of the Year	Nominated
2022	"If I Didn't Love You"	Music Video of the Year	Nominated

=== 2022 CMT Music Awards ===
Year	Nominee / work	Award	Result
2022	"If I Didn't Love You"	Video of the Year	Won
2022	"If I Didn't Love You"	Collaborative Video of the Year	Won

=== 64th Grammy Awards ===
Year	Nominee / work	Award	Result
2022	"If I Didn't Love You"	Best Country/Duo Performance	Nominated

== Music video ==
The lyric video was released on July 23, 2021, featuring Aldean and Underwood recording the song in the studio. The official video premiered on September 8, 2021, and was directed by Shaun Silva. The video was filmed at Schermerhorn Symphony Center in Nashville, Tennessee.

== Live performances ==
Aldean and Underwood gave their first live performance of the song at the 55th Annual Country Music Association Awards at Nashville's Bridgestone Arena on November 10, 2021. They also appeared at the American Music Awards of 2021 with a pre-taped performance.

== Charts ==
=== Weekly charts ===
Weekly chart performance for "If I Didn't Love You"
Chart (2021)	Peak position
Australia Digital Tracks (ARIA)	5
Australia Country Hot 50 (TMN)	4
Canada Hot 100 (Billboard)	35
Canada Country (Billboard)	1
Global 200 (Billboard)	44
New Zealand Hot Singles (RMNZ)	35
UK Singles Downloads (Official Charts)	46
UK Singles Sales (OCC)	49
US Billboard Hot 100	15
US Hot Country Songs (Billboard)	2
US Country Airplay (Billboard)	1

=== Year-end charts ===
Year-end chart performance for "If I Didn't Love You"
Chart (2021)	Position
US Billboard Hot 100	85
US Hot Country Songs (Billboard)	22
US Country Airplay (Billboard)	40

Chart (2022)	Position
US Hot Country Songs (Billboard)	14
US Country Airplay (Billboard)	16

== Certifications ==
Certifications for "If I Didn't Love You"
Region	Certification	Certified units/sales
United States (RIAA)	Platinum	1,000,000^{‡}
^{‡} Sales+streaming figures based on certification alone.

== Release history ==
Release history and formats for "If I Didn't Love You"
Region	Date	Format	Label	Ref.
Various	July 23, 2021	Digital download	Broken Bow; Macon; Capitol Nashville	
United States	August 2, 2021	Country radio	Broken Bow; Macon; Capitol Nashville	
