= Heart & Soul (Eric Church album) =

Studio album by Eric Church
- Released: April 23, 2021
- Recorded: 2020
- Genre: Outlaw country; country rock
- Length: 85:47
- Label: EMI Nashville; BigEC
- Producer: Jay Joyce

Eric Church chronology
Desperate Man (2018)	Heart & Soul (2021)	Evangeline vs. the Machine (2025)

Singles from Heart & Soul
- 1. "Stick That in Your Country Song" Released: June 25, 2020; 2. "Hell of a View" Released: November 9, 2020; 3. "Heart on Fire" Released: July 12, 2021; 4. "Doing Life with Me" Released: June 13, 2022

Heart & Soul is the seventh studio album by American country music singer-songwriter Eric Church. The album was split into three separate albums: Heart (released on April 16, 2021), & (released exclusively as a vinyl record to members of his fan club, called the Church Choir, on April 20, 2021, then released digitally on August 19, 2022) and Soul (released on April 23, 2021). The album was released by EMI Nashville, who have been Church's label home since 2011's Chief. It was preceded by the singles "Stick That in Your Country Song", which received a nomination for Best Country Solo Performance at the 63rd Annual Grammy Awards, and "Hell of a View".

== Background ==
In a short video to fans on January 21, 2021, Church officially announced the triple-album which would be released in April. He revealed that he wrote and recorded the majority of the songs for the project during a 28 day trip to the mountains of North Carolina in the midst of the COVID-19 pandemic. In an official statement, Church explained: "I've always been intrigued when a song is born in a writer room -- there is a magic that happens there. I wanted to put that in the studio form. So, every day, we would write a song in the morning and we would record the song that night. Doing it that way allowed for the songwriters to get involved in the studio process and the musicians to be involved in the creative process. You felt a little bit like you were secretly doing something that was special, and you knew it [...] You started going, 'Hmm, wait 'til the world finds out about this."

Of creating a triple album, Church stated that "The interesting thing about this process is that Jay kept asking me the last three or four days, 'Are we done?' And at that time I didn't know what the project was. I kept saying 'God, this is going to be really hard. There's a lot here. Is this a double album? And if it's a double album, how do we leave out these five or six songs?' I am the hardest critic on making sure every song deserves to be on the record, and I beat this thing to death going, 'This can't be that good.' But, it was just a special, special time and a special, special project that I think will be among our best."

The second of the three releases, & was available as a vinyl exclusive to members of Church's official fan group, the Church Choir. & was released to CD and digital/streaming platforms on August 19, 2022.

== Track listing ==
Adapted from Rolling Stone Country.

Heart
No.	Title	Writer(s)	Length
1.	"Heart on Fire"	Eric Church	4:18
2.	"Heart of the Night"	Church; Travis Hill; Jeff Hyde; Jeremy Spillman; Ryan Tyndell	3:18
3.	"Russian Roulette"	Church; Casey Beathard; Monty Criswell	3:57
4.	"People Break"	Church; Luke Laird	3:21
5.	"Stick That in Your Country Song"	Davis Naish; Jeffrey Steele	3:48
6.	"Never Break Heart"	Church; Luke Dick	3:48
7.	"Crazyland"	Church; Laird; Michael P. Heeney	2:39
8.	"Bunch of Nothing"	Church; Hyde	3:29
9.	"Love Shine Down"	Church; Beathard; Steele	2:46
Total length:			31:24

&
No.	Title	Writer(s)	Length
1.	"Through My Ray-Bans"	Church; Barry Dean; Laird	4:33
2.	"Doing Life with Me"	Church; Beathard; Steele	3:15
3.	"Do Side"	Church; Beathard	3:34
4.	"Kiss Her Goodbye"	Church; Beathard	3:52
5.	"Mad Man"	Church; Beathard	3:58
6.	"Lone Wolf"	Church; Hyde; Tyndell	3:40
Total length:			22:52

Soul
No.	Title	Writer(s)	Length
1.	"Rock & Roll Found Me"	Church; Beathard; Driver Williams	4:08
2.	"Look Good and You Know It"	Church; Travis Meadows; Jonathan Singleton	3:12
3.	"Bright Side Girl"	Church; Clint Daniels; Scotty Emerick; Hyde	3:02
4.	"Break It Kind of Guy"	Church; Beathard; Dick	3:45
5.	"Hell of a View"	Church; Beathard; Criswell	2:55
6.	"Where I Wanna Be"	Church; Beathard; Spillman; Tyndell	4:05
7.	"Jenny"	Church	3:19
8.	"Bad Mother Trucker"	Church; Beathard; Dick; Spillman	3:24
9.	"Lynyrd Skynyrd Jones"	Beathard	3:42
Total length:			31:31

== Personnel ==
Credits adapted from Taste of Country.

- Casey Beathard – acoustic guitar, background vocals, handclaps
- Jim "Moose" Brown – piano, organ
- Jeff Cease – acoustic guitar, electric guitar, slide guitar, handclaps
- Eric Church – acoustic guitar, electric guitar, lead vocals, handclaps
- Joanna Cotten – background vocals, handclaps
- Luke Dick – acoustic guitar, electric guitar, steel guitar, handclaps
- Jason Hall – background vocals, handclaps
- Jaxon Hargrove – handclaps
- Lee Hendricks – bass guitar, handclaps
- Jeff Hyde – acoustic guitar, banjo, mandolin, background vocals, handclaps
- Jay Joyce – acoustic guitar, electric guitar, keyboards, organ, programming, synthesizer, tambourine, background vocals, handclaps
- Billy Justineau – piano, mellotron, organ, synthesizer, synth bass, handclaps
- Jimmy Mansfield – handclaps
- Rob McNelley – electric guitar
- John Peets – handclaps
- Jonathan Singleton – background vocals
- Brian Snoddy – handclaps
- Bryan Sutton – acoustic guitar, dobro, mandolin, resonator guitar
- Jeffrey Steele – acoustic guitar, background vocals
- Kenny Vaughan – acoustic guitar, electric guitar
- Driver Williams – electric guitar, handclaps
- Charlie Worsham – acoustic guitar, banjo, electric guitar, mandolin, handclaps
- Craig Wright – drums, percussion, background vocals, handclaps

== Charts ==
=== Weekly charts ===
==== Heart ====
Chart performance for Heart
Chart (2021)	Peak position
Australian Country Albums (ARIA)	6
Canadian Albums (Billboard)	10
Scottish Albums (OCC)	27
UK Country Albums (OCC)	2
US Billboard 200	5
US Top Country Albums (Billboard)	3

==== & ====
Chart performance for &
Chart (2021)	Peak position
US Billboard 200	83
US Top Country Albums (Billboard)	12

==== Soul ====
Chart performance for Soul
Chart (2021)	Peak position
Australian Country Albums (ARIA)	6
Canadian Albums (Billboard)	9
Scottish Albums (OCC)	25
Swiss Albums (Schweizer Hitparade)	55
UK Country Albums (OCC)	3
US Billboard 200	4
US Top Country Albums (Billboard)	2

=== Year-end charts ===
==== Heart ====
Year-end chart performance for Heart
Chart (2021)	Position
US Top Country Albums (Billboard)	75

==== Soul ====
Year-end chart performance for Soul
Chart (2021)	Position
US Top Country Albums (Billboard)	56
