= I'm Not for Everyone =

2021 single by Brothers Osborne

Single by Brothers Osborne

from the album Skeletons
- Released: April 26, 2021
- Genre: Country
- Length: 2:52
- Label: EMI Nashville
- Songwriters: John Osborne; TJ Osborne; Luke Dick; Natalie Hemby
- Producer: Jay Joyce

Brothers Osborne singles chronology
"All Night" (2020)	"I'm Not for Everyone" (2021)	"Nobody's Nobody" (2023)

Music video
- "I'm Not for Everyone" on YouTube

"I'm Not for Everyone" is a song by American country music duo Brothers Osborne. It was released on April 26, 2021 as the second single from the duo's third studio album Skeletons. The song was written by John Osborne, TJ Osborne, Luke Dick and Natalie Hemby, and produced by Jay Joyce.

== Background ==
After closing out the 56th ACM Awards, the duo released "I'm Not for Everyone". A Universal Music Group Nashville press release stated that the song "could also be an inspirational quote for those who feel they aren't like everyone else". The duo said: "That IS our mission statement, 'cause we ARE not for everyone. I think at some point, not only in your career, but your life as a human being, you can't make everyone happy. We have spoken up so many times, and we have, I wouldn't say we've paid much of a price, but we’ve pissed a lot of people off by being ourselves. We just have to accept that no matter we are not for everybody and you have to be okay with that. And this is the first song where I actually, I sing a verse on, which is perfect because this song in particular is the both of us saying we're not everybody's cup of tea and that's okay."

== Critical reception ==
Philip Trapp of Taste of Country opined that the song "might be for anyone who's ever felt like an outsider to country music".

== Music video ==
The music video was released on August 12, 2021, and directed by Wes Edwards and Ryan "Flash" Silver. The video stars actor and singer Leslie Jordan. It showcases Jordan "walking into a bar ridden with fights, disagreements and animosity while John and TJ Osborne perform their song on stage". Jeremy Chua of Sounds Like Nashville described the clip as "part rowdy, part hilarious, and wholly wholesome".

== Live performance ==
On April 18, 2021, the duo performed the song at the 56th ACM Awards.

== Charts ==
Chart performance for "I'm Not for Everyone"
Chart (2021–2022)	Peak position
Canada Country (Billboard)	29
US Country Airplay (Billboard)	33
US Hot Country Songs (Billboard)	37

== Certifications ==
Certifications for "I'm Not for Everyone"
Region	Certification	Certified units/sales
Canada (Music Canada)	Gold	40,000^{‡}
United States (RIAA)	Platinum	1,000,000^{‡}
^{‡} Sales+streaming figures based on certification alone.

== Release history ==
Release history for "I'm Not for Everyone"
Region	Date	Format	Label	Ref.
Various	September 11, 2020	Digital download; streaming	EMI Nashville	
United States	April 26, 2021	Country radio	EMI Nashville	
