= Hell of a View =

2020 song by Eric Church

Single by Eric Church

from the album Soul
- Released: November 9, 2020
- Genre: Country rock
- Length: 2:55
- Label: EMI Nashville; BigEC
- Songwriters: Eric Church; Casey Beathard; Monty Criswell
- Producer: Jay Joyce

Eric Church singles chronology
| "Stick That in Your Country Song" (2020) | "Hell of a View" (2020) | "Heart on Fire" (2021) |

Music video
- "Hell of a View" (In Studio Performance) on YouTube

"Hell of a View" is a song by American country artist Eric Church. He co-wrote the track with Casey Beathard and Monty Criswell. It is the lead single from Church's album Soul, part of a triple album set. The track features backing vocals from Church's longtime collaborator Joanna Cotten.

== Background ==
Church was in the mountains of North Carolina when he returned from a jog to hear co-writer Casey Beathard play the song which he had been working on with Monty Criswell. Church said it felt like a "big hit but at the same time it has that timeless quality to it". The men finished writing the song and recorded it that same night.

== Critical reception ==
"Hell of a View" received generally positive reviews, with many positively noting the presence of Joanna Cotten's vocals. Craig Shelburne of CMT called the song a "romantic new single", noting Cotten's "powerful harmony" as a backing vocalist. Jon Freeman of Rolling Stone referred to the track as a "tender mid-tempo ballad", saying it "depicts the thrill of a life on the move with the one you love". Freeman also noted Cotten's "soulful voice" as a "big presence". Angela Stefano of Taste of Country called the song a "a love song for rebels".

== Commercial performance ==
"Hell of a View" is Church's highest charting single since 2012's "Springsteen", as well as the second highest of his career, peaking at number 28 on the Billboard Hot 100.

== Live performance ==
Church performed "Hell of a View" at the 54th Annual Country Music Association Awards in November 2020.

== Charts ==
=== Weekly charts ===
Weekly chart performance for "Hell of a View"
| Chart (2020–2021) | Peak position |
|---|---|
| Canada Hot 100 (Billboard) | 32 |
| Canada Country (Billboard) | 1 |
| Global 200 (Billboard) | 120 |
| US Billboard Hot 100 | 28 |
| US Country Airplay (Billboard) | 1 |
| US Hot Country Songs (Billboard) | 2 |

=== Year-end charts ===
Year-end chart performance for "Hell of a View"
| Chart (2021) | Position |
|---|---|
| Canada (Canadian Hot 100) | 82 |
| US Billboard Hot 100 | 91 |
| US Country Airplay (Billboard) | 33 |
| US Hot Country Songs (Billboard) | 16 |

== Certifications ==
Certifications for "Hell of a View"
| Region | Certification | Certified units/sales |
|---|---|---|
| Canada (Music Canada) | Platinum | 80,000^{‡} |
| United States (RIAA) | 2× Platinum | 2,000,000^{‡} |
^{‡} Sales+streaming figures based on certification alone.

== Release history ==
Release history for "Hell of a View"
| Region | Date | Format | Label | Ref. |
|---|---|---|---|---|
| Various | October 2, 2020 | Digital download | EMI Nashville; BigEC Records | |
| Various | October 2, 2020 | Streaming | EMI Nashville; BigEC Records | |
| Canada | November 9, 2020 | Country radio | EMI Nashville; BigEC Records | |
| United States | November 9, 2020 | Country radio | EMI Nashville; BigEC Records | |
