= Heart on Fire (Eric Church song) =

2021 single by Eric Church

Single by Eric Church

from the album Heart
- Released: July 12, 2021
- Genre: Country rock
- Length: 4:18
- Label: EMI Nashville
- Songwriter(s): Eric Church
- Producer(s): Jay Joyce

Eric Church singles chronology
"Hell of a View" (2020)	"Heart on Fire" (2021)	"Doing Life with Me" (2022)

Music video
- "Heart on Fire" on YouTube

"Heart on Fire" is a song recorded by American country music singer Eric Church. It was released on July 12, 2021, as second single from Church's studio album Heart. The song was written by Church, and produced by Jay Joyce.

== Background ==
Church told the story behind the song in a press release: ""Heart On Fire" was the first song we recorded when we got to North Carolina, I already had pretty much, I wrote this song by myself, but I already had this song on the rails and we were heading down the path of what this was going to be. I thought we needed to kind of break the ice and get started on something, [...] This was the song that was kind of the icebreaker for the whole project, and I credit this song a lot for getting us to where we ended up getting to with the project."

== Content ==
Website popculture.com described "Heart On Fire" as "an up-tempo, Southern rock-infused track looking back on a young love". The song quotes many classic rock songs, including "All Shook Up" (1957) by Elvis Presley, "American Pie" (1971) by Don McLean, "Paradise City" (1989) by Guns N' Roses and "New York Minute" (1990) by Don Henley.

== Critical reception ==
Robyn Collins of Taste of Country opined that the track has "a jangly John Mellencamp kind of organic-feeling drive".

== Charts ==
=== Weekly charts ===
Weekly chart performance for "Heart on Fire"
Chart (2021–2022)	Peak position
Australia Country Hot 50 (TMN)	10
Canada (Canadian Hot 100)	64
Canada Country (Billboard)	5
US Billboard Hot 100	56
US Country Airplay (Billboard)	5
US Hot Country Songs (Billboard)	12

=== Year-end charts ===
2022 year-end chart performance for "Heart on Fire"
Chart (2022)	Position
US Country Airplay (Billboard)	21
US Hot Country Songs (Billboard)	38

== Release history ==
Release history for "Heart on Fire"
Region	Date	Format	Label	Ref.
Various	January 29, 2021	Digital download; streaming	EMI Nashville	
United States	July 12, 2021	Country radio	EMI Nashville	
