= Trouble with a Heartbreak =

Single by Jason Aldean

from the album Macon, Georgia
- Released: January 14, 2022
- Genre: Country
- Length: 3:16
- Label: Broken Bow
- Songwriters: Brett Beavers; John Morgan; Kurt Allison; Tully Kennedy
- Producer: Michael Knox

Jason Aldean singles chronology
"If I Didn't Love You" (2021)	"Trouble with a Heartbreak" (2022)	"That's What Tequila Does" (2022)

Music video
- Trouble with a Heartbreak on YouTube

"Trouble with a Heartbreak" is a song written by Brett Beavers, John Morgan, Kurt Allison, and Tully Kennedy, and recorded by American country music artist Jason Aldean. It was released on January 14, 2022 as the second single from Aldean's tenth studio album Macon, Georgia.

== Background ==
Billy Dukes of Taste of Country wrote that the song "recalls slower songs" from Aldean's "My Kinda Party and Night Train era, but there's a drop of R&B production that makes one think of They Don't Know, his most progressive album to date," while also hinting it recalls "heartbreak as something of a bruise that is very slow to heal; everyone has advice on how to "move on," but none of it is any good." The song is a single from Aldean's tenth album Macon, Georgia, a two-disc release.

== Content ==
Aldean stated in a press release, “This song hit me right when I heard it, and reminded me of those bitter R&B breakup songs that take me back to riding through the backroads of Georgia.”

== Critical reception ==
BJ Mac of The Nash News wrote that "rather than an angry moving-on song or a wallowing-in-sorrow ballad, “Trouble With a Heartbreak” refreshingly honors the feelings of grief that follow a break-up in an honest and reinvigorating way." An uncredited review from Off the Record UK called it "a haunting track that showcases a more vulnerable side to Aldean’s musicality."

Upon its release, "Trouble with a Heartbreak" was added to the playlists of 84 country music radio stations surveyed by Mediabase, making it the most-added new song for the week of January 18, 2022.

== Music video ==
The song's music video was also released after the single was sent to radio. Directed in December 2021 by Shaun Silva, the video features concert footage from Aldean's three-day concert at the Park Theater in Las Vegas, Nevada, interspersed with footage of a cowboy at the National Finals Rodeo in the same city.

== Charts ==
=== Weekly charts ===
Weekly chart performance for "Trouble with a Heartbreak"
Chart (2022)	Peak position
Canada Hot 100 (Billboard)	61
Canada Country (Billboard)	2
US Billboard Hot 100	32
US Country Airplay (Billboard)	1
US Hot Country Songs (Billboard)	4

=== Year-end charts ===
2022 year-end chart performance for "Trouble with a Heartbreak"
Chart (2022)	Position
US Billboard Hot 100	88
US Country Airplay (Billboard)	9
US Hot Country Songs (Billboard)	22

== Release history ==
Release history for "Trouble with a Heartbreak"
Region	Date	Format	Label	Ref.
Various	January 14, 2022	Digital download; streaming	Broken Bow	
United States	January 18, 2022	Country radio	Broken Bow	
