= The Good Ones (Gabby Barrett song) =

Single by Gabby Barrett

from the album Goldmine
- Released: June 8, 2020
- Genre: Country pop
- Length: 3:33
- Label: Warner Music Nashville
- Songwriters: Gabby Barrett; Zach Kale; Emily Landis; Jim McCormick
- Producers: Zach Kale; Ross Copperman

Gabby Barrett singles chronology
"I Hope" (2019)	"The Good Ones" (2020)	"Footprints on the Moon" (2021)

"The Good Ones" is a song recorded by American country music singer Gabby Barrett for her debut studio album, Goldmine (2020). Barrett co-wrote the song with Zach Kale, Emily Landis, and Jim McCormick, while Kale produced the track with Ross Copperman. "The Good Ones" was released to digital retailers and streaming services on June 8, 2020, as the album's second official single. The song reached number one on the US Billboard Hot Country Songs chart and is certified 4× platinum in the United States. It was the sixth-bestselling country song of 2021 in the United States.

== Content ==
Barrett wrote "The Good Ones" in 2019 alongside Zach Kale, Emily Landis, and Jim McCormick. The song was inspired by Barrett's husband Cade Foehner and was intended to highlight positive relationships, in contrast to the type of story depicted in "I Hope". Lyrically, the song is a "nuanced ballad" that describes the type of man one would hope to marry.

== Critical reception ==
Billy Dukes of Taste of Country praised the songwriting of "The Good Ones", writing that its lyricists crafted "the sort of song 19-year-olds aren't supposed to be able to write yet," and added that the song "promises to make a greater impact than ["I Hope"]." Chris Parton of Sounds Like Nashville wrote that the song features "soaring vocals and epic-feeling instrumentation." In a largely positive review for Goldmine, Brian Mansfield of Variety cited "The Good Ones" as one of the examples of the "big hooks and big emotions" that contribute to the album's success.

== Commercial performance ==
"The Good Ones" peaked at number one on the Billboard Hot Country Songs chart, becoming Barrett's second consecutive number one single on that chart. The song also reached number one on the Country Airplay chart, where it spent three weeks at the top, marking the longest run at number one for a female artist since Miranda Lambert's "The House That Built Me" in 2010. The song became a top 20 hit on the US Billboard Hot 100, peaking at 19. As of June 2022, "The Good Ones" has sold over 3,000,000 copies.

== Music video ==
An accompanying music video directed by Brian Vaughan and Taylor Kelly premiered August 29, 2019. The video features Miss Wheelchair USA 2017, Madeline Delp, as a wheelchair-using bride-to-be dreaming of being able to stand and dance with her groom at her wedding. Throughout the video, scenes are shown of Delp's groom-to-be, played by Patrick Worstell, creating a harness to assist Delp with remaining on her feet. This culminates in the couple dancing together at their fictional wedding with the aid of Worstell's harness creation. Barrett wanted to use the video to showcase that "everyone's love story is going to be unique," while Delp has stated that the video draws on real life experience.

== Charts ==
=== Weekly charts ===
Chart (2020–2022)	Peak position
Canada Hot 100 (Billboard)	41
Canada Country (Billboard)	3
Global 200 (Billboard)	96
US Billboard Hot 100	19
US Adult Contemporary (Billboard)	11
US Country Airplay (Billboard)	1
US Hot Country Songs (Billboard)	1

=== Year-end charts ===
Chart (2020)	Position
US Hot Country Songs (Billboard)	74

Chart (2021)	Position
US Billboard Hot 100	62
US Adult Contemporary (Billboard)	31
US Country Airplay (Billboard)	14
US Hot Country Songs (Billboard)	6

Chart (2022)	Position
US Adult Contemporary (Billboard)	22

== Certifications ==
Region	Certification	Certified units/sales
Canada (Music Canada)	3× Platinum	240,000^{‡}
New Zealand (RMNZ)	Gold	15,000^{‡}
United States (RIAA)	5× Platinum	5,000,000^{‡}
^{‡} Sales+streaming figures based on certification alone.

== Release history ==
Country	Date	Format	Label	Version	Ref.
Promotional single
Various	July 12, 2019	Digital download; streaming	Warner	Original	
Various	December 20, 2019	Digital download; streaming	Warner	Acoustic	
Official single
United States	June 8, 2020	Country radio	Warner Nashville	Original	
