= Dan + Shay discography =

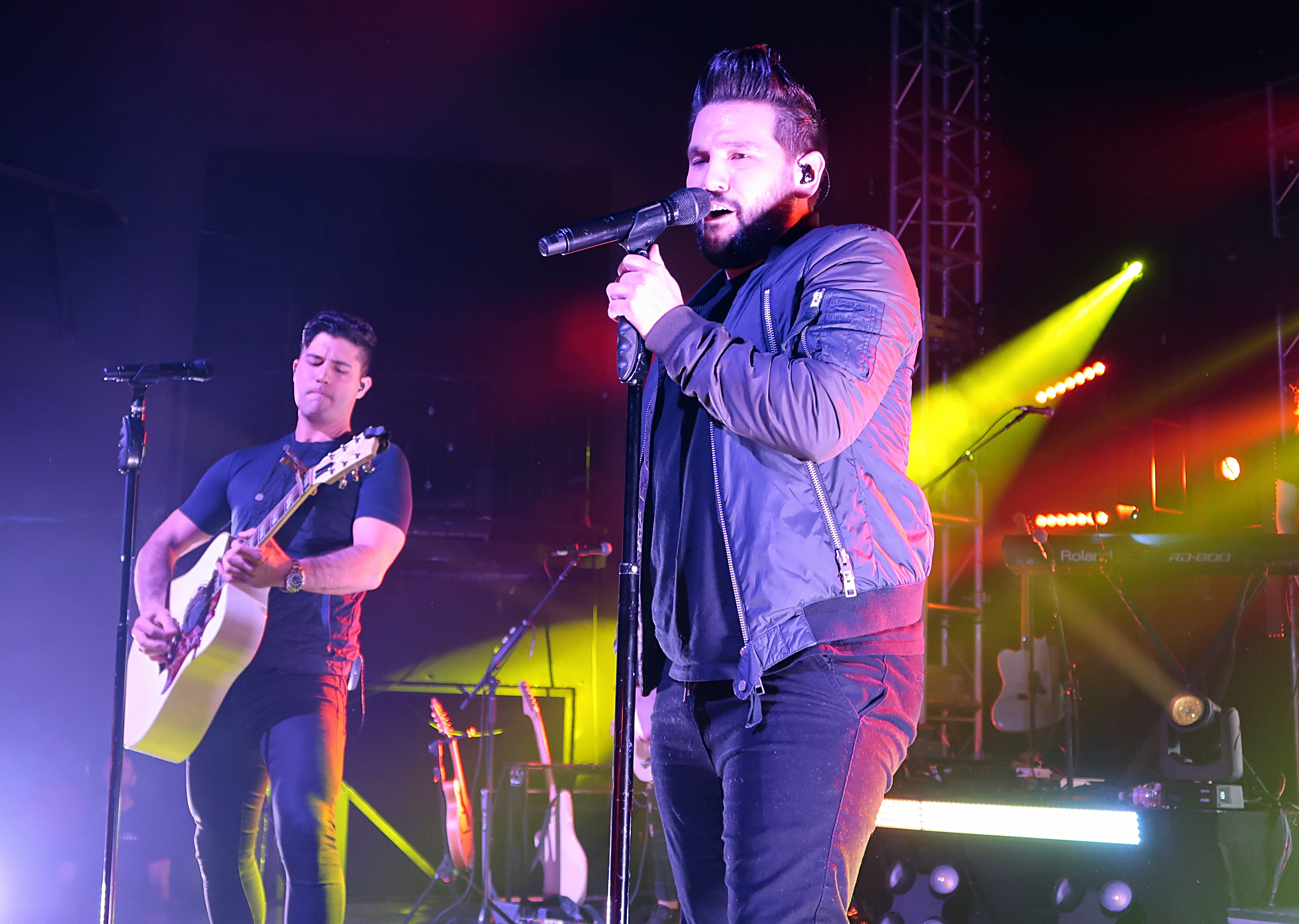
- Dan + Shay performing in 2017 (From left to right: Dan Smyers, Shay Mooney)
- Studio albums: 6
- Singles: 16
- Music videos: 18
- Other charted songs: 8
- Promotional singles: 8

American country pop duo Dan + Shay have released six studio albums and 16 singles. They have achieved nine top ten hits on the Billboard Country Airplay chart, including eight number one songs. Since the release of "Tequila" in 2018, they have experienced crossover success, placing three singles, including "Tequila", in the top ten of the Adult Pop Songs chart in addition to their success in the country genre.

== Studio albums ==
| Title | Album details | Peak chart positions | | | | | Sales | Certifications |
| Title | Album details | US | US Country | AUS | CAN | UK Country | Sales | Certifications |
|---|---|---|---|---|---|---|---|---|
| Where It All Began | Release date: April 1, 2014; Label: Warner Nashville; Formats: CD, digital download, streaming | 6 | 1 | — | 12 | 11 | US: 157,000 | RIAA: Gold; MC: Gold |
| Obsessed | Release date: June 3, 2016; Label: Warner Nashville; Formats: CD, digital download, streaming | 8 | 2 | 91 | 23 | 1 | US: 95,700 | RIAA: Gold; MC: Gold |
| Dan + Shay | Release date: June 22, 2018; Label: Warner Nashville; Formats: CD, digital download, streaming | 6 | 1 | 15 | 11 | 2 | US: 167,300 | RIAA: 2× Platinum; MC: 3× Platinum; RMNZ: Gold |
| Good Things | Release date: August 13, 2021; Label: Warner Nashville; Formats: CD, digital download, streaming | 6 | 2 | 28 | 12 | 4 | US: 12,000 | RIAA: Platinum; MC: Platinum; RMNZ: Gold |
| Bigger Houses | Release date: September 15, 2023; Label: Warner Nashville; Formats: CD, digital download, streaming | 34 | 9 | — | — | 10 | | |
| It's Officially Christmas: The Double Album | Release date: October 18, 2024; Label: Warner Nashville; Formats: CD, digital download, streaming | 88 | 14 | — | — | — | | |
| Young | Release date: August 21, 2026; Label: Warner Nashville; Formats: CD, digital download, streaming | 153 | 30 | — | — | — | | |
"—"denotes an album that failed to chart.

== Singles ==
=== As lead artists ===
| Title | Year | Peak chart positions | | | | | | | | Sales | Certifications | Album |
| Title | Year | US | US Country | US Country Airplay | US Adult | AUS | CAN | CAN Country | UK | Sales | Certifications | Album |
|---|---|---|---|---|---|---|---|---|---|---|---|---|
| "19 You + Me" | 2013 | 42 | 7 | 11 | — | — | 47 | 23 | — | US: 720,000 | RIAA: 2× Platinum; MC: Platinum | Where It All Began |
| "Show You Off" | 2014 | — (Note: "Show You Off" did not enter the Billboard Hot 100, but peaked at number 11 on Bubbling Under Hot 100 Singles chart.) | 29 | 21 | — | — | — | — | — | US: 159,000 | RIAA: Gold; MC: Gold | Where It All Began |
| "Nothin' Like You" | 2015 | 51 | 5 | 1 | — | — | 72 | 4 | — | US: 318,000 | RIAA: 2× Platinum; MC: Platinum | Where It All Began |
| "From the Ground Up" | 2016 | 48 | 3 | 1 | — | — | 77 | 10 | — | US: 607,000 | RIAA: 3× Platinum; MC: 2× Platinum | Obsessed |
| "How Not To" | 2016 | 57 | 7 | 1 | — | — | — | 25 | — | US: 158,000 | RIAA: Platinum; MC: Platinum | Obsessed |
| "Road Trippin'" | 2017 | — | — | 42 | — | — | — | — | — | | | Obsessed |
| "Tequila" | 2018 | 21 | 1 | 1 | 10 | 66 | 59 | 1 | — | US: 707,000 | RIAA: Diamond; ARIA: 2× Platinum; BPI: Silver; MC: Diamond; RMNZ: 2× Platinum | Dan + Shay |
| "Speechless" | 2018 | 24 | 1 | 1 | 5 | — | 41 | 2 | — | US: 619,000 | RIAA: 7× Platinum; MC: 7× Platinum; RMNZ: Platinum | Dan + Shay |
| "All to Myself" | 2019 | 31 | 3 | 1 | — | — | 69 | 1 | — | US: 123,000 | RIAA: 3× Platinum; MC: 3× Platinum | Dan + Shay |
| "10,000 Hours" (with Justin Bieber) | 2019 | 4 | 1 | 1 | 5 | 4 | 2 | 1 | 17 | US: 256,000 | RIAA: 5× Platinum; ARIA: 2× Platinum; BPI: Platinum; IFPI DEN: Gold; MC: 8× Platinum; RMNZ: 3× Platinum | Good Things |
| "I Should Probably Go to Bed" | 2020 | 28 | 4 | 2 | 10 | — | 80 | 26 | — | | RIAA: 2× Platinum; MC: Platinum | Good Things |
| "Glad You Exist" | 2021 | 21 | 2 | 1 | — | — | 45 | 8 | — | | RIAA: 2× Platinum; MC: 2× Platinum; RMNZ: Gold | Good Things |
| "Steal My Love" | 2021 | 98 | 26 | 28 | — | — | — | — | — | | RIAA: Gold; MC: Gold | Good Things |
| "You" | 2022 | 87 | 22 | 3 | — | — | — | 21 | — | | RIAA: Gold; MC: Gold | Good Things |
| "Save Me the Trouble" | 2023 | 38 | 11 | 2 | — | — | — | 5 | — | | RIAA: Gold; MC: Gold | Bigger Houses |
| "Bigger Houses" | 2024 | 91 | 20 | 4 | — | — | — | 38 | — | | MC: Gold | Bigger Houses |
| "Always Gonna Be" | 2025 | — | — | — | — | — | — | 52 | — | | | Bigger Houses |
| "Say So" | 2026 | 66 | 20 | 4 | — | — | 91 | 14 | — | | | Young |
"—" denotes a single that failed to chart.

=== As featured artists ===
| Title | Year | Peak chart positions | | Album |
| Title | Year | US Bub. | NZ Hot | Album |
|---|---|---|---|---|
| "That's Not How This Works" (Charlie Puth featuring Dan + Shay or Sabrina's version featuring Sabrina Carpenter) | 2023 | 20 | 4 | Non-album single |

=== Promotional singles ===
| Title | Year | Peak chart positions | | Sales | Certifications | Album |
| Title | Year | US Country | US Christ | Sales | Certifications | Album |
|---|---|---|---|---|---|---|
| "Already Ready" | 2016 | 44 | — | | | Obsessed |
| "When I Pray for You" | 2017 | 39 | 3 | | | The Shack |
| "Alone Together" | 2018 | 39 | — | US: 10,000 | RIAA: Gold; MC: Platinum | Dan + Shay |
| "Keeping Score" (featuring Kelly Clarkson) | 2018 | 32 | — | US: 17,000 | RIAA: Gold; MC: Platinum | Dan + Shay |
| "Good Things" | 2021 | 31 | — | | MC: Gold | Good Things |
| "Lying" | 2021 | — | — | | | Good Things |
| "Heartbreak on the Map" | 2023 | — | — | | | Bigger Houses |
| "Marry You Again" | 2026 | 50 | — | | | Young |
"—" denotes a single that failed to chart.

== Other charted and certified songs ==
| Title | Year | Peak positions | | | | | | | | | Certifications | Album |
| Title | Year | US | US Country | US Country Airplay | US AC | BEL (FL) | CAN | CAN Country | CAN AC | NZ Hot | Certifications | Album |
|---|---|---|---|---|---|---|---|---|---|---|---|---|
| "What You Do to Me" | 2014 | — | 39 | — | — | — | — | — | — | — | | Where It All Began |
| "Have Yourself a Merry Little Christmas" | 2014 | — | — | — | 17 | — | — | — | — | — | | It's Officially Christmas: The Double Album |
| "What Keeps You Up at Night" | 2018 | — | 50 | — | — | — | — | — | — | — | | Dan + Shay |
| "Take Me Home for Christmas" | 2020 | 48 | 2 | 37 | — | — | 91 | 45 | — | — | RIAA: Gold; MC: Gold | It's Officially Christmas: The Double Album |
| "Christmas Isn't Christmas" | 2020 | — (Note: "Christmas Isn't Christmas" did not enter the Hot 100, but peaked at number 21 on the Bubbling Under Hot 100 Singles extension chart.) | 34 | — | — | — | — | — | 38 | — | | It's Officially Christmas: The Double Album |
| "Officially Christmas" | 2021 | — | 33 | 45 | 10 | 36 | — | — | — | — | | It's Officially Christmas: The Double Album |
| "Pick Out a Christmas Tree" | 2022 | 63 | 6 | — | 7 | — | — | — | — | — | RIAA: Gold | It's Officially Christmas: The Double Album |
| "Holiday Party" | 2022 | — | 42 | — | 13 | — | — | — | — | 26 | | It's Officially Christmas: The Double Album |
"—" denotes releases that did not chart.

== Other appearances ==
| Title | Year | Artist | Album |
|---|---|---|---|
| "Those Days" | 2016 | Lindsey Stirling | Brave Enough |
| "Say" | 2017 | RaeLynn | WildHorse |
| "When I Pray for You" | 2017 | Various artists | The Shack |

== Music videos ==
| Video | Year | Director | Ref. |
|---|---|---|---|
| "19 You + Me" | 2014 | Brian Lazzaro | |
| "Show You Off" | 2014 | Patrick Tracy | |
| "Have Yourself a Merry Little Christmas" | 2014 | Patrick Tracy | |
| "Nothin' Like You" | 2015 | Patrick Tracy | |
| "From the Ground Up" | 2016 | Shaun Silva | |
| "How Not To" | 2016 | Patrick Tracy | |
| "When I Pray for You" | 2017 | —N/a | |
| "Road Trippin'" | 2017 | Patrick Tracy | |
| "Tequila" | 2018 | Patrick Tracy | |
| "All to Myself" | 2018 | Patrick Tracy | |
| "Speechless" | 2018 | Patrick Tracy | |
| "Alone Together" | 2018 | —N/a | |
| "10,000 Hours" (with Justin Bieber) | 2019 | Patrick Tracy | |
| "Good Things" | 2021 | Patrick Tracy | |
| "Lying" | 2021 | Dani Vitale/Patrick Tracy | |
| "Steal My Love" | 2021 | Patrick Tracy | |
| "Save Me the Trouble" | 2023 | Patrick Tracy | |
| "Bigger Houses" | 2023 | Patrick Tracy | |
| "Heartbreak on the Map" | 2023 | —N/a | |
| "Say So" | 2026 | Dan Smyers | |
