= The (Arena) Tour =

2020–21 concert tour by Dan + Shay

- Tour by Dan + Shay
- Location: North America
- Associated album: Dan + Shay; Good Things
- Start date: March 6, 2020
- End date: December 7, 2021
- Legs: 2
- No. of shows: 34
- Supporting acts: The Band Camino; Ingrid Andress

Dan + Shay concert chronology
- Dan + Shay Tour (2019); The (Arena) Tour (2020)

The (Arena) Tour was the fifth concert tour by American country music duo Dan + Shay, in support of their eponymous album and Good Things. The tour first began in Nashville on March 6, 2020, until it briefly was postponed after March 8, 2020 due to the COVID-19 pandemic. The tour resumed in Greenville on September 9, 2021, and ended in Boston on December 7, 2021.

== Background ==
On October 4, 2019, the duo first released a collaboration with Justin Bieber titled "10,000 Hours". Days after the single release, the duo announced tour dates for North America. The Band Camino and Ingrid Andress were announced as opening acts. On March 12, 2020, after performing in Columbus, the duo announced the tour would be postponed to summer and fall 2020. Dates were postponed again to 2021, which also led to some cancellations after they were unable to reschedule from 2020 postponements.

== Set list ==
2020

This set list is from the concert on March 6, 2020 in Nashville. It is not intended to represent all shows from the tour.

1. "10,000 Hours"
2. "Alone Together"
3. "All to Myself"
4. "What Keeps You Up At Night"
5. "Make or Break"
6. "Stupid Love"
7. "Nothin’ Like You"
8. "Keeping Score"
9. "From the Ground Up"
10. "Lately"
11. "No Such Thing"
12. "How Not To"
13. "Island Time"
14. "My Side of the Fence"
15. "Lipstick"
16. "Already Ready"
17. "When I Pray For You"
18. "Speechless"
19. "19 You + Me"
20. "Tequila"
2021

This set list is from the concert on September 17, 2021 in Pittsburgh. It is not intended to represent all shows from the tour.

1. "10,000 Hours"
2. "Alone Together"
3. "All to Myself"
4. "What Keeps You Up At Night"
5. "Make or Break"
6. "Nothin’ Like You"
7. "Keeping Score"
8. "From the Ground Up"
9. "You"
10. "Lately"
11. "Lean On Me"
12. "Lying"
13. "Good Things"
14. "Steal My Love"
15. "How Not To"
16. "Island Time"
17. "Give in to You"
18. "Glad You Exist"
19. "My Side of the Fence"
20. "10,000 Hours" (Reprise)
21. "I Should Probably Go to Bed"
22. "Speechless"
23. "19 You + Me"
24. "Tequila"

== Tour dates ==
List of 2020 concerts
| Date | City | Country | Venue | Opening acts |
|---|---|---|---|---|
| March 6, 2020 | Nashville | United States | Bridgestone Arena | The Band Camino; Ingrid Andress |
| March 7, 2020 | Nashville | United States | Bridgestone Arena | The Band Camino; Ingrid Andress |
| March 8, 2020 | Columbus | United States | Nationwide Arena | The Band Camino; Ingrid Andress |

List of 2021 concerts
| Date | City | Country | Venue | Opening acts |
|---|---|---|---|---|
| September 9, 2021 | Greenville | United States | Bon Secours Wellness Arena | The Band Camino; Ingrid Andress |
| September 10, 2021 | Charlottesville | United States | John Paul Jones Arena | The Band Camino; Ingrid Andress |
| September 11, 2021 | Uncasville | United States | Mohegan Sun Arena | The Band Camino; Ingrid Andress |
| September 14, 2021 | Philadelphia | United States | Wells Fargo Center | The Band Camino; Ingrid Andress |
| September 16, 2021 | New York City | United States | Madison Square Garden | The Band Camino; Ingrid Andress |
| September 17, 2021 | Pittsburgh | United States | PPG Paints Arena | The Band Camino; Ingrid Andress |
| September 18, 2021 | Greensboro | United States | Greensboro Coliseum | The Band Camino; Ingrid Andress |
| September 23, 2021 | Louisville | United States | KFC Yum! Center | The Band Camino; Ingrid Andress |
| September 24, 2021 | Milwaukee | United States | Fiserv Forum | The Band Camino; Ingrid Andress |
| September 25, 2021 | Minneapolis | United States | Target Center | The Band Camino; Ingrid Andress |
| October 1, 2021 | Indianapolis | United States | Gainbridge Fieldhouse | The Band Camino; Ingrid Andress |
| October 2, 2021 | Chicago | United States | United Center | The Band Camino; Ingrid Andress |
| October 3, 2021 | Grand Rapids | United States | Van Andel Arena | The Band Camino; Ingrid Andress |
| October 15, 2021 | Los Angeles | United States | Staples Center | The Band Camino; Ingrid Andress |
| October 16, 2021 | San Diego | United States | Pechanga Arena | The Band Camino; Ingrid Andress |
| October 17, 2021 | Glendale | United States | Gila River Arena | The Band Camino; Ingrid Andress |
| October 20, 2021 | San Francisco | United States | Chase Center | The Band Camino; Ingrid Andress |
| October 21, 2021 | Sacramento | United States | Golden 1 Center | The Band Camino; Ingrid Andress |
| October 23, 2021 | Salt Lake City | United States | Vivint Arena | The Band Camino; Ingrid Andress |
| October 24, 2021 | Denver | United States | Ball Arena | The Band Camino; Ingrid Andress |
| October 28, 2021 | Portland | United States | Moda Center | The Band Camino; Ingrid Andress |
| October 29, 2021 | Tacoma | United States | Tacoma Dome | The Band Camino; Ingrid Andress |
| November 12, 2021 | Omaha | United States | CHI Health Center | The Band Camino; Ingrid Andress |
| November 13, 2021 | Tulsa | United States | BOK Center | The Band Camino; Ingrid Andress |
| November 14, 2021 | Kansas City | United States | T-Mobile Center | The Band Camino; Ingrid Andress |
| November 20, 2021 | New Orleans | United States | Smoothie King Center | The Band Camino; Ingrid Andress |
| November 21, 2021 | Dallas | United States | American Airlines Center | The Band Camino; Ingrid Andress |
| December 3, 2021 | Detroit | United States | Little Caesars Arena | The Band Camino; Ingrid Andress |
| December 4, 2021 | Hershey | United States | Giant Center | The Band Camino; Ingrid Andress |
| December 5, 2021 | Newark | United States | Prudential Center | The Band Camino; Ingrid Andress |
| December 7, 2021 | Boston | United States | TD Garden | The Band Camino; Ingrid Andress |

=== Cancelled shows ===
List of cancelled concerts, showing date, city, country, venue, reason for cancellation and reference
| Date | City | Country | Venue | Reason | Ref. |
|---|---|---|---|---|---|
| August 1, 2020 | San Antonio | United States | AT&T Center | COVID-19 pandemic | |
| September 17, 2020 | North Little Rock | United States | Simmons Bank Arena | COVID-19 pandemic | |
| September 18, 2020 | St. Louis | United States | Enterprise Center | COVID-19 pandemic | |
| September 24, 2020 | Washington, D.C. | United States | Capital One Arena | COVID-19 pandemic | |
| October 17, 2020 | Las Vegas | United States | T-Mobile Arena | COVID-19 pandemic | |
| October 29, 2020 | Boise | United States | ExtraMile Arena | COVID-19 pandemic | |
| November 4, 2021 | Orlando | United States | Amway Center | A member from their team tested positive for COVID-19 | |
| November 5, 2021 | Atlanta | United States | State Farm Arena | A member from their team tested positive for COVID-19 | |
