= Bigger Houses (song) =

Single by Dan + Shay

from the album Bigger Houses
- Released: February 5, 2024
- Genre: Country
- Length: 3:17
- Label: Warner Nashville
- Songwriters: Dan Smyers; Andy Albert; Jordan Minton; Jordan Reynolds
- Producers: Dan Smyers; Scott Hendricks

Dan + Shay singles chronology
"Save Me the Trouble" (2023)	"Bigger Houses" (2024)	"Always Gonna Be" (2025)

"Bigger Houses" is a song by American country music duo Dan + Shay. It was released on February 5, 2024, as the second single and title track from their fifth studio album, Bigger Houses. Duo member Dan Smyers wrote the song with Andy Albert, Jordan Minton, and Jordan Reynolds.

== History ==
According to Country Top 40 with Fitz, the song is about "gratitude and appreciating the people you have around you and not always chasing after what’s next". Dan Smyers, one half of the duo, said that the song's message was inspired by feelings the duo had after winning their first Grammy Award.

Dan Smyers, the other half of the duo, said that the song's central message came from a conversation he and his wife had with songwriter Andy Albert when Albert purchased a new house and told the two about renovations he wanted to make to it. Albert then came up with the title "Bigger Houses" and presented it during a songwriting session with Jordan Minton and Jordan Reynolds at the latter's house. They then wrote the song together, with Smyers playing piano and Reynolds playing guitar. Mooney liked the recording of the demo, and executives of Warner Records Nashville chose the song to be on the duo's album, which did not yet have a title. Dan + Shay then recorded the song. The final recording features the duo's vocals as well as guitar, mandolin, and Dobro parts all played by Bryan Sutton. Smyers did not think the song would be a single due to its minimalist production style.

== Charts ==
=== Weekly charts ===
Weekly chart performance for "Bigger Houses"
Chart (2024–2025)	Peak position
Canada Country (Billboard)	38
US Billboard Hot 100	91
US Country Airplay (Billboard)	4
US Hot Country Songs (Billboard)	20

=== Year-end charts ===
Year-end chart performance for "Bigger Houses"
Chart (2025)	Position
US Country Airplay (Billboard)	45
US Hot Country Songs (Billboard)	90

== Certifications ==
Region	Certification	Certified units/sales
Canada (Music Canada)	Gold	40,000^{‡}
^{‡} Sales+streaming figures based on certification alone.
