= Obsessed (Dan + Shay album) =

Studio album by Dan + Shay
- Released: June 3, 2016
- Recorded: 2015
- Studio: Ocean Way Nashville, Major Bob Studios, Blackbird Studio and Starstruck Studios (Nashville, Tennessee); Hound's Ear Studio (Franklin, Tennessee); The Lodge (North Hollywood, California); The Compound (Harbeson, Delaware)
- Genre: Country
- Length: 36:52
- Label: Warner Bros. Nashville
- Producer: Dan Smyers; Scott Hendricks; Martin Johnson; Jesse Frasure

Dan + Shay chronology
Where It All Began (2014)	Obsessed (2016)	Dan + Shay (2018)

Singles from Obsessed
- 1. "From the Ground Up" Released: February 5, 2016; 2. "How Not To" Released: September 26, 2016; 3. "Road Trippin'" Released: July 17, 2017

Obsessed is the second studio album by American country duo Dan + Shay, released by Warner Bros. Nashville on June 3, 2016. The lead single, "From the Ground Up", was released in February 2016. The second single, "How Not To", was released in September 2016. The third single, "Road Trippin'" released on July 17, 2017.

== Background ==
In 2015, Dan + Shay experienced a career breakthrough when "Nothin' Like You", the third single from their chart-topping debut album, reached number one on the Billboard Country Airplay chart. That same year, they began work on their second album. The duo told country music blog The Boot that they have grown as artists and songwriters in the time since completing their first record but didn't stray too far from what fans have come to expect from them on Obsessed. They also noted that they had more time to work on this album, and as a result they are "really, really proud" of the music they created. Obsessed became available for pre-order on April 29, 2016.

The album's title is derived from the final track and was inspired by the duo's fans. Following the release of "From the Ground Up", Dan + Shay noticed fans using the hashtag "#obsessed" in relation to the song, and they ultimately decided the descriptor was appropriate for the album. "We're even more obsessed with making music for our fans than they are to hear it," explained vocalist Shay Mooney.

"All Nighter" was previously recorded by American country music trio Lady Antebellum for the deluxe edition of their sixth studio album, 747 (2014).

== Promotion ==
=== Singles ===
The lead single for the album, "From the Ground Up", was released on February 5, 2016. It debuted at number 37 on the Country Airplay chart before its official radio release date (February 22, 2016) and has since peaked at number one; it has also reached a peak of number three on the Hot Country Songs chart and entered the top 50 on the Billboard Hot 100.

"How Not To" was released to radio on September 26, 2016, as the album's second official single.

"Road Trippin'" was selected by a fan vote as the record's third single. It was released to country radio on July 17, 2017.

=== Other songs ===
"Already Ready" was made available to digital retailers on April 29, 2016, alongside the pre-order launch. It entered the Hot Country Songs chart at number 44.

== Commercial performance ==
Obsessed debuted on the Billboard 200 at number eight and the Top Country Albums chart at number two, selling 26,000 copies (33,000 equivalent album units) in its first week. The album has sold 95,700 copies in the US as of September 2017.

== Track listing ==
No.	Title	Writer(s)	Producer(s)	Length
1.	"All Nighter"	Nicolle Galyon; Jimmy Robbins; David Hodges	Dan Smyers; Scott Hendricks	3:23
2.	"Road Trippin'"	Smyers; Shay Mooney; Martin Johnson	Smyers; Johnson	3:33
3.	"From the Ground Up"	Smyers; Mooney; Chris DeStefano	Smyers; Hendricks	4:15
4.	"Already Ready"	Smyers; Mooney; Shane McAnally; Robbins	Smyers; Hendricks	3:22
5.	"How Not To"	Adam Hambrick; Paul DiGiovanni; Kevin Bard	Smyers; Hendricks	3:13
6.	"Lipstick"	Smyers; Mooney; Galyon	Smyers; Hendricks	3:29
7.	"Round the Clock"	Smyers; Mooney; Jesse Frasure; Hodges	Smyers; Frasure	3:23
8.	"Lately"	Smyers; Mooney; Johnson	Smyers; Johnson	4:04
9.	"Sway"	Smyers; Mooney; Liz Rose; busbee	Smyers; Hendricks	3:10
10.	"Obsessed"	Smyers; Mooney; Nolan Lambroza; Breyan Isaac	Smyers; Hendricks	5:00
Total length:				36:52

== Personnel ==
Dan + Shay

- Shay Mooney – vocals
- Dan Smyers – vocals, electric guitar, programming

Additional musicians

- Gordon Mote – keyboards (1, 4–6, 9, 10), acoustic piano (3), string arrangements (3)
- Martin Johnson – keyboards (2, 8), acoustic piano (2, 8), acoustic guitar (2, 8), electric guitar (2, 8), backing vocals (2, 8), bass (8)
- Brandon Paddock – programming (2, 8), slide guitar (2), ganjo (2), mandolin (2, 8), bass (2), backing vocals (2), banjo (8)
- Jesse Frasure – keyboards (7), programming (7), bass (7), drums (7)
- Danny Rader – acoustic guitar (1)
- Bryan Sutton – acoustic guitar (1, 4–6, 9, 10)
- Derek Wells – electric guitar (1, 3–6, 9, 10)
- Russ Pahl – pedal steel guitar (1, 3, 4)
- Jimmie Lee Sloas – bass (1, 3–6, 9, 10)
- Nir Z – drums (1, 3–6, 9, 10), percussion (1, 3–6, 9, 10), programming (1, 3–6, 9, 10)
- Emily Nelson – cello (3)
- Elisabeth Lamb – viola (3)
- Jessica Blackwell – violin (3)
- Charles Dixon – violin (3)
- Charlie Judge – string arrangements (3)
- Jim Horn – alto saxophone (10), baritone saxophone (10)
- Doug Moffet – tenor saxophone (10)
- Roy Agee – trombone (10)
- Scott Ducaj – trumpet (10)

=== Production ===
- Scott Hendricks – A&R direction, recording (1, 3–6, 9, 10), digital editing
- Dan Smyers – recording, digital editing
- Jeff Balding – recording (1, 3–6, 9, 10)
- Martin Johnson – recording (2, 8)
- Nicholas Morzov – recording (2, 8), digital editing
- Brandon Paddock – recording (2, 8)
- Jesse Frasure – recording (7)
- Matt Coles – recording assistant (1, 3–6, 9, 10)
- Devin Kam – recording assistant (2, 8)
- Brian David Willis – digital editing
- Nir Z – digital editing
- Jeff Juliano – mixing (1, 2, 7, 8)
- Justin Niebank – mixing (3–6, 9, 10)
- Dave Cook – mix assistant (1, 2, 7, 8)
- Drew Bollman – mix assistant (3–6, 9, 10)
- Andrew Mendelson – mastering at Georgetown Masters (Nashville, Tennessee)
- Scott Johnson – production assistant
- Shane Tarleton – creative director
- Patrick Tracy – art direction, design
- David McClister – photography
- Amber Lehman – stylist
- Lindsay Doyle – grooming
- Scooter Brown – management
- Jason Owen – management

== Charts ==
=== Weekly charts ===
Chart (2016)	Peak position
Australian Albums (ARIA)	91
Canadian Albums (Billboard)	23
UK Country Albums (OCC)	1
US Billboard 200	8
US Top Country Albums (Billboard)	2

=== Year-end charts ===
Chart (2016)	Position
US Top Country Albums (Billboard)	39
Chart (2017)	Position
US Top Country Albums (Billboard)	54

== Certifications ==
Region	Certification	Certified units/sales
Canada (Music Canada)	Gold	40,000^{‡}
United States (RIAA)	Gold	500,000^{‡}
^{‡} Sales+streaming figures based on certification alone.
