= Say So (Dan + Shay song) =

2026 single by Dan + Shay

Single by Dan + Shay

from the album Young
- Released: April 3, 2026
- Genre: Country
- Length: 3:21
- Label: Warner Nashville
- Songwriters: Dan Smyers; Shay Mooney; David Hodges; Jimmy Robbins
- Producers: Dan Smyers; Scott Hendricks

Dan + Shay singles chronology
"Long Live Christmas" (2025)	"Say So" (2026)

Music video
- "Say So" on YouTube

"Say So" is a song by American country music duo Dan + Shay It was released on April 3, 2026, as the lead single from their seventh studio album, Young. It was written by Dan Smyers, Shay Mooney, David Hodges and Jimmy Robbins and produced by Smyers and Scott Hendricks.

== Background ==
In an interview with Variety, Dan + Shay stated that the song was inspired by the suicide of their mentor Ben Vaughn, the head of Warner Chappell Music Publishing. They were initially concerned that the song would be "too heavy" for fans, but decided it was important to raise awareness on the issue and offer hope to people. After writing the song, Dan Smyers played the demo for his wife and realized that he had composed it on what would have been Vaughn's 50th birthday. In regard to the production, Smyers was meticulous about audio equalization and used real instruments instead of programmed sounds to create a sound that would "feel real" and "age well".

== Content ==
In the first verse, Dan + Shay describe their devastation upon learning about Ben Vaughn's suicide. The chorus highlights the importance of reaching out when needed, as well as helping and supporting those who are experiencing hardships. The second verse explores the theme of unexpressed internal conflicts and encourages people to open up about them as a means of forming a connection.

== Music video ==
The music video was released alongside the single. It opens with Shay Mooney being arrested and pleading guilty to vandalism and defacement of public property. The clip alternates between scenes of Mooney carrying a coffin and another man walking across a bridge, visibly distressed and implied to be contemplating suicide. The judge dismisses the case after seeing the positive message that Mooney had spray painted on the concrete under the bridge ("If you need somebody, say so", a line from the song). The man on the bridge sees his message and calls a loved one, which ultimately saves his life.

== Charts ==
Chart performance for "Say So"
Chart (2026)	Peak position
Canada Hot 100 (Billboard)	91
Canada Country (Billboard)	14
US Billboard Hot 100	66
US Country Airplay (Billboard)	4
US Hot Country Songs (Billboard)	20
