= Take Me Home for Christmas =

Song by Dan + Shay

from the album It's Officially Christmas: The Double Album
- Released: November 6, 2020
- Genre: Christmas
- Length: 3:23
- Label: Warner Nashville
- Songwriters: Dan Smyers; Jordan Reynolds; Shay Mooney; Andy Albert; Mitchell Tenpenny; Jordan Schmidt
- Producer: Dan Smyers

Music video
- "Take Me Home for Christmas" on YouTube

"Take Me Home for Christmas" is a Christmas song by American duo Dan + Shay. It was released on November 6, 2020, and later included on their sixth studio album and first Christmas project, It's Officially Christmas: The Double Album (2024). The song peaked at number two on the Billboard Hot Country Songs chart, the duo's eighth top 5 hit on that chart. It also reached numbers 37 and 48 on both the Country Airplay and Hot 100 charts respectively. "Take Me Home for Christmas" was certified Gold by the Recording Industry Association of America (RIAA), denoting sales of over 500,000 units in the country. It also charted in Canada, peaking at numbers 45 and 91 on both the Country and Canadian Hot 100 charts respectively. The song garnered a Gold certification by Music Canada, denoting sales of 40,000 units in that country.

== Background and content ==
Dan + Shay announced the release of the song on Instagram on November 5, 2020.

Dan Smyers said about the song: "This is our first original Christmas song, [...] our fans have asked for Christmas music every year, so I hope you all have as much fun listening to it as we did making it."

== Commercial performance ==
On the week of December 12, 2020, "Take Me Home for Christmas" debuted at number 34 on the Billboard Hot Country Songs chart. The following week, it debuted at number 88 on the Hot 100. It also debuted at number 48 on the Country Airplay chart the week of December 26, and peaked at number 37 the next week before leaving the chart. The song peaked at numbers two and 48 on the Hot Country Songs and Hot 100 charts the week of January 2, 2021, staying for five and four weeks respectively. The song was certified gold by the RIAA on February 3, 2022.

In Canada, the track debuted and peaked at numbers 45 and 91 on the Canada Country and Canadian Hot 100 charts respectively for the week of January 2, 2021. The song was certified gold by Music Canada on June 16, 2026.

== Live performances ==
On December 15, 2020, Dan + Shay performed "Take Me Home for Christmas" during the season 19 finale of the American reality television series The Voice. They performed on a festive "traditional small town" set, with Shay wearing a Christmas sweater and Dan wearing a red-and-black checked jacket. On December 18, 2024, they performed the song at the Grand Ole Opry as a part of Little Big Town's Christmas at the Opry holiday show.

== Music video ==
The music video was released at the same time of the song's release. The video is paired with their other Christmas song "Christmas Isn't Christmas".

== Chart performance ==
Chart performance for "Take Me Home for Christmas"
Chart (2020–2021)	Peak position
Canada Hot 100 (Billboard)	91
Canada Country (Billboard)	45
US Billboard Hot 100	48
US Country Airplay (Billboard)	37
US Hot Country Songs (Billboard)	2

== Certifications ==
Certifications for "Take Me Home for Christmas"
Region	Certification	Certified units/sales
Canada (Music Canada)	Gold	40,000^{‡}
United States (RIAA)	Gold	500,000^{‡}
^{‡} Sales+streaming figures based on certification alone.
