= Young (Dan + Shay album) =

2026 studio album by Dan + Shay

Studio album by Dan + Shay
- Released: August 21, 2026
- Length: 32:10
- Label: Warner Nashville
- Producers: Dan Smyers; Scott Hendricks

Dan + Shay chronology
It's Officially Christmas: The Double Album (2024)	Young (2026)

Singles from Young
- 1. "Say So" Released: April 3, 2026

Young is the seventh studio album by American country duo Dan + Shay. It was released through Warner Bros. Nashville on August 21, 2026. "Say So" was released as its lead single on April 3, 2026.

== Tracklisting ==
Young track listing
No.	Title	Writer(s)	Length
1.	"Young"	Dan Smyers; Shay Mooney; Hillary Lindsey; Lori McKenna; Liz Rose	2:46
2.	"Say So"	Smyers; Mooney; David Hodges; Jimmy Robbins	3:21
3.	"Marry You Again"	Smyers; Mooney; Rocky Block; Matt Dragstrem	3:06
4.	"Forever Like This"	Smyers; Mooney; Hodges; Robbins	3:04
5.	"Her, the Kids, and Jesus"	Smyers; Mooney; Andy Albert; Dragstrem	2:45
6.	"Dogs in Our Twenties"	Smyers; Mooney; Lindsey; McKenna; Rose	2:50
7.	"Already Yours"	Smyers; Mooney; Jaxson Free; Jordan Schmidt	3:08
8.	"The Old Guys" (featuring Cody Johnson)	Smyers; Mooney; Blake Pendergrass; Chris Tompkins	3:04
9.	"Bible in the Truck"	Smyers; Mooney; Albert; Robbins	3:05
10.	"The Price of Love"	Smyers; Mooney; Tofer Brown; Lauren Hungate	3:41
Total length:			32:10

== Charts ==
Chart performance for Young
Chart (2026)	Peak position
US Billboard 200	153
US Top Country Albums (Billboard)	30
