= Steal My Love =

2021 single by Dan + Shay

Single by Dan + Shay

from the album Good Things
- Released: August 13, 2021
- Genre: Country pop; reggae
- Length: 2:42
- Label: Warner Nashville
- Songwriters: Dan Smyers; Ashley Gorley; Andy Albert; Jordan Reynolds
- Producer: Dan Smyers

Dan + Shay singles chronology
"Glad You Exist" (2021)	"Steal My Love" (2021)	"You" (2022)

Music video
- "Steal My Love" on YouTube

"Steal My Love" is a song by American country pop duo Dan + Shay. It was released as the fourth single from their fourth studio album, Good Things, on August 13, 2021. Duo-member Dan Smyers wrote the song with Ashley Gorley, Andy Albert and Jordan Reynolds, and produced it.

== Content ==
Sutton Reekes of Nicki Swift explained that "Steal My Love" is "overtly about love and relationships." Duo sang in the lyrics: "My car, my clothes, my money. Take it all but there ain't nobody gonna steal my love." This lyrics is alluding to their wives.

== Music video ==
The music video was released on August 17, 2021, and directed Patrick Tracy. It was filmed in Springfield, Tennessee. The video stars the duo as bank robbers, trying to steal a mysterious briefcase which is locked inside a vault. Later, they safely get the briefcase before it can be stolen by other robbers. Subsequently they "lead the bad guys on a chase through town" and dance on the street.

== Commercial performance ==
After the album was released, the song debut at number 98 on the Billboard Hot 100 and number 26 on the Billboard Hot Country Songs. Upon its release as a single, it peaked at number 28 on the Billboard Country Airplay chart in March 2022, becoming the duo's lowest-charting single since "Road Trippin'" peaked at number 42 in 2017.

== Credits and personnel ==
=== Dan + Shay ===
- Dan Smyers - vocals, production, songwriting, programming
- Shay Mooney - vocals, songwriting

== Charts ==
=== Weekly charts ===
Weekly chart performance for "Steal My Love"
Chart (2021–2022)	Peak position
New Zealand Hot Singles (RMNZ)	35
US Billboard Hot 100	98
US Country Airplay (Billboard)	28
US Hot Country Songs (Billboard)	26

=== Year-end charts ===
2022 year-end chart performance for "Steal My Love"
Chart (2022)	Position
US Hot Country Songs (Billboard)	87

== Certifications ==
Certifications for "Steal My Love"
Region	Certification	Certified units/sales
Canada (Music Canada)	Gold	40,000^{‡}
United States (RIAA)	Gold	500,000^{‡}
^{‡} Sales+streaming figures based on certification alone.
