= Show You Off =

Single by Dan + Shay

from the album Where It All Began
- Released: May 12, 2014
- Recorded: 2013–14
- Genre: Country; country pop
- Length: 3:03
- Label: Warner Bros. Nashville
- Songwriters: Dan Smyers; Shay Mooney; Danny Orton
- Producers: Dan Smyers; Scott Hendricks; Danny Orton

Dan + Shay singles chronology
"19 You + Me" (2013)	"Show You Off" (2014)	"Nothin' Like You" (2015)

"Show You Off" is a song recorded by American country music duo Dan + Shay for their debut studio album, Where It All Began (2014). The uptempo country track was written by group members Dan Smyers and Shay Mooney along with Danny Orton, and was produced by Smyers with additional production by Orton and Scott Hendricks. It was released through Warner Bros. Nashville on May 12, 2014 as the second single from the album. "Show You Off" was well received by country radio, becoming the most-added track in its debut week.

== Music video ==
The music video was directed by Patrick Tracy and premiered in July 2014. It consists entirely of footage from the duo's live shows.

== Chart performance ==
"Show You Off" debuted at number 51 on the U.S. Billboard Country Airplay chart for the week of May 24, 2014. The song has sold 159,000 copies in the US as of December 2014.

Chart (2014–2015)	Peak position
US Bubbling Under Hot 100 (Billboard)	11
US Country Airplay (Billboard)	21
US Hot Country Songs (Billboard)	29

=== Year-end charts ===
Chart (2014)	Position
US Country Airplay (Billboard)	79
US Hot Country Songs (Billboard)	81

Chart (2015)	Position
US Country Airplay (Billboard)	100

== Certifications ==
Certifications for "Show You Off"
Region	Certification	Certified units/sales
Canada (Music Canada)	Gold	40,000^{‡}
United States (RIAA)	Gold	500,000^{‡}
^{‡} Sales+streaming figures based on certification alone.
