= Lying (Dan + Shay song) =

2021 single by Dan + Shay

Promotional single by Dan + Shay

from the album Good Things
- Released: July 29, 2021
- Length: 2:26
- Label: Warner Nashville
- Songwriters: Dan Smyers; Shay Mooney; Andy Albert; Bill Withers; Jordan Reynolds
- Producer: Smyers

Music video
- "Lying" on YouTube

"Lying" is a song by American country pop duo Dan + Shay. It was released as a promotional single from their fourth studio album, Good Things, on July 29, 2021. The song was solely produced by duo-member Dan Smyers. It interpolates late American singer-songwriter Bill Withers' 1972 single, "Lean on Me", therefore, he is credited as a songwriter.

== Background and composition ==
On July 27, 2021, Dan + Shay announced the song and its release date along with a teaser video. On the song's chorus, they sing the lines, "I don't miss you in my bed / I don't hear you in my head / I don't love you / I'm not cryin' / And I swear, I'm not lyin'" and "the verses double down on the message that this song's narrator is all the way over his ex". Angela Stefano of Taste of Country felt that "all their bombtastic professions might leave you feeling a bit dubious" after listened to more closely. The song contains a "jazzy piano-driven tune".

== Music video ==
The official music video premiered alongside the song on July 29, 2021. It is directed by Dani Vitale and Patrick Tracey. Dan + Shay start off performing the song inside of a dive bar. Later, they go outside to the audience and then perform a choreographed dance. On the same day the song and music video were released, Dan + Shay commentated their opinions on social media, stating that "this is the most fun we've ever had making a music video" and also announced a dance challenge that emulates the dance that was performed in the visuals.

== Credits and personnel ==
Credits adapted from Tidal.

=== Dan + Shay ===
- Dan Smyers – vocals, production, songwriting, programming
- Shay Mooney – vocals, songwriting

=== Other musicians and technical ===
- Andy Albert – songwriting
- Bill Withers – songwriting
- Jordan Reynolds – songwriting, programming
- Bryan Sutton – acoustic guitar, mandolin, dobro
- Derek Wells – electric guitar
- Jimmie Lee Sloas – bass guitar
- Nir Z – drums, percussion
- Gordon Mote – piano, Hammond B-3 organ
- Ryan Yount – assistant engineering
- Jeff Juliano – mixing
- Dave Cook – assistant mixing
- Eric Kirkland – assistant mixing
- Andrew Mendelson – mastering
- Jeff Balding – recording
