= Nothin' Like You =

Single by Dan + Shay

from the album Where It All Began
- Released: February 23, 2015
- Recorded: 2013–14
- Genre: Country pop; pop
- Length: 3:06
- Label: Warner Bros. Nashville
- Songwriters: Dan Smyers; Shay Mooney; Chris DeStefano; Ashley Gorley
- Producer: Chris DeStefano

Dan + Shay singles chronology
"Show You Off" (2014)	"Nothin' Like You" (2015)	"From the Ground Up" (2016)

"Nothin' Like You" is a song recorded by American country music duo Dan + Shay for their debut studio album, Where It All Began (2014). The song was written by both group members along with Chris DeStefano and Ashley Gorley.

"Nothin' Like You" reached number one on the Billboard Country Airplay chart, giving the duo their first number-one country hit in their career. It also peaked at numbers five and 51 on both the Hot Country Songs and Hot 100 charts respectively. The song was certified double platinum by the Recording Industry Association of America (RIAA), and has sold 318,000 copies as of May 2016. It also charted in Canada, reaching number four on the Canada Country chart and number 72 on the Canadian Hot 100 chart. It garnered a platinum certification from Music Canada, denoting sales of over 80,000 units in that country.

An accompanying music video for the song, directed by Patrick Tracy, features the duo and highlights rescue dogs, a passion close to the duo's hearts.

== Critical reception ==
A writer for Taste of Country gave the song a positive review, saying that "Dan + Shay continue to brand themselves as country's sweetest pop sound. "Nothin' Like You" is the duo's newest single from Where It All Began. The mid-tempo love song is musical cotton candy."

== Commercial performance ==
"Nothin' Like You" first entered the Billboard Country Airplay chart dated March 7, 2015 at number 59, and number 49 on the Hot Country Songs chart dated April 18. It also debuted on the Hot 100 at number 97 the week of August 29. On December 5, it became the duo's first number-one single on the Country Airplay chart, surpassing their previous high of number eleven achieved by "19 You + Me" in 2014. The song eventually peaked at number five on the Hot Country Songs chart and number 51 on the Hot 100 in December 2015. As of May 2016, the song has sold 318,000 copies in the United States. On May 9, 2024, it was certified double platinum by the RIAA for sales of over two million units in the United States.

In Canada, the single debuted at number 48 on the Canada Country chart the week of August 15, and peaked at number four the week of January 2, 2016, remaining on the chart for 27 weeks. It also debuted at number 85 on the Canadian Hot 100 the week of December 12. Six weeks later, it peaked at number 72 the week of January 23, and stayed on the chart for nine weeks. "Nothin' Like You" was certified platinum by Music Canada for sales of over 80,000 copies in Canada.

== Music video ==
The music video was directed by Patrick Tracy and premiered in July 2015. The video starts with the duo attending the red carpet of the 50th Academy of Country Music Awards before cutting to them at a diner the next morning. Besides Shay is a Doberman pinscher that leaves to go chase a Labrador, and the duo follows them while picking up other different canines along the way, and playing with them in a mud field. It cuts back to the diner, showing that it was all a dream.

== Charts ==
=== Weekly charts ===
Chart (2015–2016)	Peak position
Canada Hot 100 (Billboard)	72
Canada Country (Billboard)	4
US Billboard Hot 100	51
US Country Airplay (Billboard)	1
US Hot Country Songs (Billboard)	5

=== Year-end charts ===
Chart (2015)	Position
US Country Airplay (Billboard)	9
US Hot Country Songs (Billboard)	31
Chart (2016)	Position
US Hot Country Songs (Billboard)	94

== Certifications ==
Region	Certification	Certified units/sales
Canada (Music Canada)	Platinum	80,000^{‡}
United States (RIAA)	2× Platinum	2,000,000^{‡}
^{‡} Sales+streaming figures based on certification alone.
