= Save Me the Trouble =

2023 single by Dan + Shay

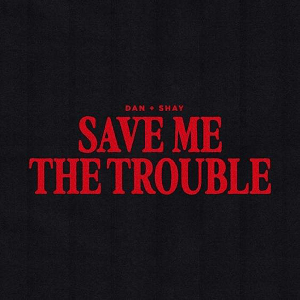

Single by Dan + Shay

from the album Bigger Houses
- Released: July 14, 2023
- Genre: Country pop
- Length: 3:20
- Label: Warner Nashville
- Songwriters: Dan Smyers; Shay Mooney; Ashley Gorley; Jordan Reynolds; Jordan Minton
- Producers: Dan Smyers; Scott Hendricks

Dan + Shay singles chronology
"That's Not How This Works" (2023)	"Save Me the Trouble" (2023)	"Bigger Houses" (2024)

Music video
- "Save Me the Trouble" on YouTube

"Save Me the Trouble" is a song by American country pop duo Dan + Shay. It was released through Warner Records Nashville as the lead single from their fifth studio album, Bigger Houses, on July 14, 2023. The song was produced by duo member Dan Smyers himself and Scott Hendricks, and the former wrote it alongside duo member Shay Mooney, Ashley Gorley, Jordan Reynolds, and Jordan Minton. The song and official music video were released alongside three promotional singles from the album and their respective music videos: "Heartbreak on the Map", "Always Gonna Be", and the title track. The tune reached number 2 on the Country Airplay chart during the week of January 13, 2024, right behind Nate Smith's smash hit "World on Fire".

== Background and composition ==
In a press release on the same day that the song was released, duo member Dan Smyers shared his thoughts about it:

I don't think I've ever been prouder of a song that I am this one. We wanted to have something that was a real moment, and when we started writing this, it felt like it could be something big. I wanted every section to build, and even in the second chorus, when you're like, "Okay, there's no way it could possibly get any crazier," then Shay takes off even further.

"Save Me the Trouble" is a country pop song and power ballad. Dan + Shay announced the song three days before its release and announced the album two days later.

== Charts ==
=== Weekly charts ===
Weekly chart performance
Chart (2023–2024)	Peak position
Canada Country (Billboard)	5
US Billboard Hot 100	38
US Country Airplay (Billboard)	2
US Hot Country Songs (Billboard)	11

=== Year-end charts ===
Year-end chart performance
Chart (2024)	Position
US Country Airplay (Billboard)	37
US Hot Country Songs (Billboard)	68
US Radio Songs (Billboard)	66

== Certifications ==
Certifications for "Save Me the Trouble"
Region	Certification	Certified units/sales
Canada (Music Canada)	Gold	40,000^{‡}
United States (RIAA)	Gold	500,000^{‡}
^{‡} Sales+streaming figures based on certification alone.
