= Where It All Began (Dan + Shay album) =

Studio album by Dan + Shay
- Released: April 1, 2014
- Recorded: 2013–14
- Studios: The Mix Tank, Sound Emporium Studios, Ocean Way Nashville and Blackbird Studio (Nashville, Tennessee); Hound's Ear Studio (Franklin, Tennessee)
- Genre: Country pop
- Length: 41:40
- Label: Warner Bros. Nashville
- Producers: Dan Smyers; Scott Hendricks; Danny Orton; Chris DeStefano

Dan + Shay chronology
Where It All Began (2014)	Obsessed (2016)

Singles from Where It All Began
- 1. "19 You + Me" Released: October 14, 2013; 2. "Show You Off" Released: May 12, 2014; 3. "Nothin' Like You" Released: February 23, 2015

Where It All Began is the debut studio album by American country duo Dan + Shay. It was released on April 1, 2014, via Warner Bros. Nashville. The album includes the singles "19 You + Me", "Show You Off", and "Nothin' Like You".

== Critical reception ==
Professional ratings
Review scores
Source	Rating
AllMusic	3/5 stars
Country Weekly	B
Got Country Online	3.5/5 stars
Roughstock	4/5 stars
USA Today	3/4 stars

Where It All Began has garnered generally positive reviews from five music critics. Brian Mansfield of USA Today gave the album three stars out of four, saying stating that the duo "make[s] the music of first dates and summertime flings that last forever in the memory", and their "sun-kissed harmonizing and carefree delivery may be informed by contemporary pop, but they're storytellers at heart." Alanna Conaway of Country Weekly gave the album a B grade, writing that the duo "have emerged [...] as true songwriters and vocalists, and still have plenty of directions to go with future albums." However, Conaway believes that the album could have been better in the lyrical department because they focus on "the good memories and moments in life." Mark Deming of AllMusic rated it three out of five stars, saying that "As far as craft goes, Dan + Shay clearly know what they're doing and are remarkably canny" and "If country radio needs clean-cut but hunky young men to croon with maximum professionalism for female listeners (and the guys who want to get to know them better), there's no question Dan + Shay can fill the bill, and Where It All Began shows they do what they do very well indeed." Matt Bjorke of Roughstock rated the album four out of five stars, stating that the release "feels like the album will indeed be the point where the duo and fans point to and say" this is the place it started, which according to him is "Not bad for the music world’s latest 'overnight sensation.'" Tara Toro of Got Country Online rated the album three-and-a-half stars out of five, writing that "The songs flow together nicely, but at times tend to sound alike, especially lyrically." In addition, Toro closes with saying that this "is an easy to listen to youthful album that many country fans surely wont 'say no' to adding to their library."

== Commercial performance ==
Where It All Began debuted at number six on the US Billboard 200 and number one on the US Top Country Albums, selling 29,000 album-equivalent units in its first week. As of June 2016, the album has sold 157,000 copies in the United States. On January 10, 2018, the album was certified gold by the Recording Industry Association of America (RIAA) for combined sales and album-equivalent units of over 500,000 in the United States.

== Track listing ==
All tracks are written by Dan Smyers and Shay Mooney, with additional co-writers as noted.

No.	Title	Writer(s)	Length
1.	"Show You Off"	Danny Orton	3:03
2.	"Stop Drop + Roll"	Orton	3:17
3.	"19 You + Me"	Orton	3:37
4.	"What You Do to Me"	Orton	3:30
5.	"Can't Say No"	Rhett Akins; Ben Hayslip	2:54
6.	"First Time Feeling"	Hayslip	3:59
7.	"Nothin' Like You"	Chris DeStefano; Ashley Gorley	3:06
8.	"Somewhere Only We Know"	Cary Barlowe	3:06
9.	"Parking Brake"	Nathan Chapman	3:36
10.	"I Heard Goodbye"	Orton	3:42
11.	"Party Girl"	Nicolle Galyon	3:53
12.	"Close Your Eyes"	Orton	3:57
Total length:			41:40

All songs produced by Dan Smyers, Scott Hendricks, and Danny Orton, except "Can't Say No", produced by Smyers and Hendricks, and "Nothin' Like You", produced by Chris DeStefano.

== Personnel ==
Dan + Shay

- Shay Mooney – lead vocals, backing vocals, acoustic guitar
- Dan Smyers – programming, acoustic guitar, electric guitars, banjo, percussion, backing vocals

Additional musicians

- Tim Akers – programming
- Danny Orton – keyboards, programming, drums
- Chris DeStefano – keyboards (7), programming (7), acoustic guitar (7), electric guitars (7), mandolin (7), bass (7), drums (7)
- Adam Shoenfeld – electric guitars
- Bryan Sutton – acoustic guitar, banjo, mandolin
- Jimmie Lee Sloas – bass
- Eric Darken – percussion
- Craig Nelson – arco bass
- Anthony LaMarchina – cello
- Carole Rabinowitz – cello
- Carolyn Dawn Johnson – backing vocals (11)

=== Production ===
- Scott Hendricks – A&R direction, recording, digital editing
- Jeff Balding – recording
- Danny Orton – recording
- Dan Smyers – recording, digital editing
- Brian David Willis – digital editing
- Justin Niebank – mixing
- Drew Bollman – mix assistant
- Seth Morton – mix assistant
- Andrew Mendelson – mastering at Georgetown Masters (Nashville, Tennessee)
- Scott Johnson – production assistant
- Shane Tarleton – creative director
- Patrick Tracy – art direction, design
- Williams + Hirakawa – photography
- Scooter Brown – management
- Jason Owen – management

== Charts ==
=== Weekly charts ===
Chart (2014)	Peak position
Canadian Albums (Billboard)	12
UK Country Albums (Official Charts)	11
US Billboard 200	6
US Top Country Albums (Billboard)	1

=== Year-end charts ===
Chart (2014)	Position
US Top Country Albums (Billboard)	44

=== Singles ===
Year	Single	Peak chart positions				
Year	Single	US Country	US Country Airplay	US	CAN Country	CAN
2013	"19 You + Me"	7	11	42	23	47
2014	"Show You Off"	29	21	111	—	—
2015	"Nothin' Like You"	5	1	51	4	72
"—" denotes releases that did not chart

== Certifications ==
Region	Certification	Certified units/sales
Canada (Music Canada)	Gold	40,000^{‡}
United States (RIAA)	Gold	500,000^{‡}
^{‡} Sales+streaming figures based on certification alone.
