= You (Dan + Shay song) =

Single by Dan + Shay

from the album Good Things
- Released: July 18, 2022
- Genre: Country pop
- Length: 3:16
- Label: Warner Nashville
- Songwriters: Dan Smyers; Jordan Reynolds; Dave Barnes
- Producers: Dan Smyers; Scott Hendricks

Dan + Shay singles chronology
| "Steal My Love" (2021) | "You" (2022) | "That's Not How This Works" (2023) |

"You" is a song by American country music duo Dan + Shay. It was released on July 18, 2022 as the fifth single from their fourth studio album Good Things.

== Content ==
Carena Liptak of Taste of Country describes the song as "sway-along, breezy country pop". According to duo member Shay Mooney, the song was intended to be a lyrical sequel to the duo's earlier single "Speechless". The song was released in late 2022 as the fifth single from the duo's album Good Things. Dan Smyers, the other half of the duo, co-wrote with Dave Barnes and Jordan Reynolds.

== Chart performance ==
=== Weekly charts ===
Weekly chart performance for "You"
| Chart (2022–2023) | Peak position |
|---|---|
| Canada Country (Billboard) | 21 |
| US Billboard Hot 100 | 87 |
| US Country Airplay (Billboard) | 3 |
| US Hot Country Songs (Billboard) | 22 |

=== Year-end charts ===
Year-end chart performance for "You"
| Chart (2023) | Position |
|---|---|
| US Country Airplay (Billboard) | 28 |
| US Hot Country Songs (Billboard) | 76 |

== Certifications ==
Certifications for "You"
| Region | Certification | Certified units/sales |
|---|---|---|
| Canada (Music Canada) | Gold | 40,000^{‡} |
| United States (RIAA) | Gold | 500,000^{‡} |
^{‡} Sales+streaming figures based on certification alone.
