= Bigger Houses =

2023 studio album by Dan + Shay

Studio album by Dan + Shay
- Released: September 15, 2023
- Studio: Abby Road Studios, Ocean Way Nashville, Blackbird Studio, Sound Emporium Studios and Warner Bros. Nashville (Nashville, Tennessee); Hound's Ear Studio (Franklin, Tennessee)
- Length: 37:47
- Label: Warner Nashville
- Producer: Dan Smyers; Scott Hendricks

Dan + Shay chronology
Good Things (2021)	Bigger Houses (2023)	It's Officially Christmas: The Double Album (2024)

Singles from Bigger Houses
- 1. "Save Me the Trouble" Released: July 14, 2023; 2. "Bigger Houses" Released: February 5, 2024; 3. "Always Gonna Be" Released: March 3, 2025

Bigger Houses is the fifth studio album by American country duo Dan + Shay. It was released through Warner Bros. Nashville on September 15, 2023. All tracks on the album were produced by duo member Dan Smyers and Scott Hendricks. It serves as the follow-up to their previous album, Good Things (2021). The album was supported by one single, "Save Me the Trouble", and four promotional singles: "Heartbreak on the Map", "Always Gonna Be", the title track, and "We Should Get Married".

== Background and promotion ==
In a press release for promoting the album, duo member Dan Smyers said: "Some of our records have been more pop- or hip-hop/R&B-infused. But on this record, I wanted to make tracks that we could hop up at any bar anywhere with our live band and play the songs as they were recorded. Ultimately, this music, this whole album, is something that I'll be able to look back on in a decade or two and be really proud of the way it turned out". Dan + Shay announced the album and its release date on July 14, 2023, along with the lead single, "Save Me the Trouble", and three promotional singles: "Heartbreak on the Map", "Always Gonna Be", and the title track; all songs were released alongside official music videos. The fourth and final promotional single, "We Should Get Married", was released on August 25, 2023.

== Track listing ==
Bigger Houses track listing
No.	Title	Writer(s)	Length
1.	"Breakin' Up with a Broken Heart"	Dan Smyers; Shay Mooney; Zach Crowell; Ashley Gorley	2:59
2.	"Save Me the Trouble"	Smyers; Mooney; Gorley; Jordan Minton; Jordan Reynolds	3:20
3.	"Heartbreak on the Map"	Smyers; Jimmy Robbins; Ernest Keith Smith	3:16
4.	"Always Gonna Be"	Smyers; Mooney; Gorley; Minton; Reynolds	2:52
5.	"For the Both of Us"	Smyers; Andy Albert; Reynolds	2:45
6.	"Then Again"	Smyers; Mooney; Albert; Lori McKenna; Reynolds	2:50
7.	"Heaven + Back"	Smyers; Mooney; Matt Dragstrem; Josh Thompson	3:08
8.	"What Took You So Long"	Smyers; Minton; Reynolds; Robbins	3:04
9.	"Missing Someone"	Trannie Anderson; Adam Doleac; Dylan Guthro; Gordie Sampson	3:05
10.	"We Should Get Married"	Smyers; Mooney; Albert	3:41
11.	"Neon Cowgirl"	Smyers; Mooney; Crowell; Gorley; Jessie Jo Dillon	3:30
12.	"Bigger Houses"	Smyers; Albert; Minton; Reynolds	3:17
Total length:			37:47

== Personnel ==
Dan + Shay

- Dan Smyers – vocals (all tracks), programming (1–11), synthesizers (4, 6), cello (9)
- Shay Mooney – vocals (all tracks)

Additional musicians

- Gordon Mote – acoustic piano (1–11), Hammond B3 organ (1–4, 7, 9, 10), synthesizers (2, 3), string arrangements (2, 5, 8), keyboards (10, 11)
- Charles Judge – synthesizers (2, 5, 8), string arrangements (2, 8), string conductor (5)
- Jordan Reynolds – programming (6), resonator guitar (6)
- Matt Dragstrem – programming (7), electric guitars (7)
- Jimmy Robbins – programming (8)
- Bryan Sutton – acoustic guitar (1–5, 7–10, 12), mandolin (1, 4, 12), dobro (1, 12), banjo (4, 7), resonator guitar (4), bass (12)
- Derek Wells – electric guitars (1–11)
- Ilya Toshinskiy – acoustic guitar (6, 11)
- Paul Franklin – steel guitar (1, 4–10), lap steel guitar (9)
- Russ Pahl – steel guitar (2, 3)
- Jimmie Lee Sloas – bass (1–11)
- Nir Z – drums (1–11), percussion (1–8, 10, 11)
- Aubrey Haynie – fiddle (1, 4, 5, 10, 11)
- Nicholas Gold – cello (5, 8)
- Sari Reist – cello (5, 8)
- Joel Reist – upright bass (5, 8)
- Carl Larson – viola (5, 8)
- Seanad Chang – viola (5, 8)
- Alicia Enstrom – violin (5, 8)
- Alison Hoffman – violin (5, 8)
- Jenny Bifano – violin (5, 8)
- Jessica Blackwell – violin (5, 8)
- Jimin Lim – violin (5, 8)
- Abby Smyers – vocals (4)
- Jordan Reynolds – programming, resonator guitar (6)

Production and Technical

- Rohan Kohill – A&R
- Scott Hendricks – producer
- Dan Smyers – producer, design, layout
- Jeff Balding – engineer
- Michael Walter – assistant engineer (1, 4–11)
- Tate Sablatura – assistant engineer (2, 3)
- Justin Niebank – mixing
- Drew Bollman – additional mix engineer
- Brian David Willis – digital editing
- Andrew Mendelson – mastering at Georgetown Masters (Nashville, Tennessee)
- Clark Mims Tedesco – artist development
- Patrick Tracy – creative director, design, layout, photography, photo editing
- Robby Klein – photography
- Amber Lehman – styling
- Kirsten Atkinson – grooming
- Jason Owen – management
- Lisa Ray – management

== Charts ==
Chart performance for Bigger Houses
Chart (2023)	Peak position
Australian Country Albums (ARIA)	16
UK Album Downloads (OCC)	43
UK Country Albums (OCC)	10
US Billboard 200	34
US Top Country Albums (Billboard)	9
