= 10,000 Hours =

2019 single by Dan + Shay and Justin Bieber

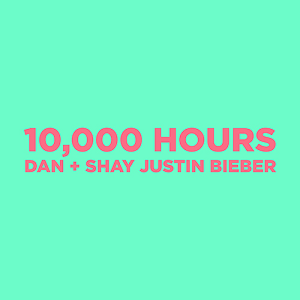

Single by Dan + Shay and Justin Bieber

from the album Good Things
- Released: October 4, 2019
- Genre: Country pop
- Length: 2:47
- Label: Warner Nashville
- Songwriters: Dan Smyers; Shay Mooney; Justin Bieber; Jason Boyd; Jessie Jo Dillon; Jordan Reynolds
- Producer: Dan Smyers

Dan + Shay singles chronology
"All to Myself" (2019)	"10,000 Hours" (2019)	"I Should Probably Go to Bed" (2020)

Justin Bieber singles chronology
"Bad Guy" (2019)	"10,000 Hours" (2019)	"Yummy" (2020)

Music video
- "10,000 Hours" on YouTube

"10,000 Hours" is a song by American country music duo Dan + Shay and Canadian singer Justin Bieber. It was released on October 4, 2019, as the lead single from Dan + Shay's fourth studio album, Good Things (2021). Released four days after Justin and Hailey Bieber's wedding in South Carolina on September 30, the song was written by duo members Dan Smyers and Shay Mooney, Justin Bieber, Poo Bear, Jessie Jo Dillon, and Jordan Reynolds, and produced solely by Smyers. The song won Best Country Duo/Group Performance at the 2021 Grammy Awards.

The song debuted at number four on the US Billboard Hot 100. It also made history on Billboard's Streaming Songs chart by becoming the highest-charting non-holiday country song in the history of the chart, besting the number nine peak of Florida Georgia Line's "Cruise".

== Composition ==
The song is set in the key of B-flat major, vocal range spans from C_{3} to B♭_{4} with a tempo of 88-92 beats per minute. The track was described by Billboard as "mid-tempo".

== Promotion ==
On September 29, Dan + Shay began teasing on social media that a track was arriving on October 4. They, as well as Justin Bieber, revealed the collaboration on October 2.

== Commercial performance ==
"10,000 Hours" debuted at number four on the US Billboard Hot 100, the first country song to debut in the top ten since 2012. This is also Dan + Shay's first top ten hit in the US and Bieber's 16th. On the Country Airplay chart, it is the duo's seventh number one and Bieber's first. In its first full week of tracking, it received 33.3 million streams, and became the highest-charting non-holiday country song in the history of the streaming chart at number three. It also sold 53,000 downloads in first week, and it was the number one song on the Hot Country Songs chart. It sold a further 17,000 copies in the second week. It was No. 1 for 21 weeks on the Hot Country Songs chart, the fourth longest reign in the chart history. It was certified Gold by the RIAA on December 10, 2019, and Platinum on January 16, 2020, later being certified quadruple platinum in 2021. It has sold 256,000 copies in the United States as of March 2020.

== Piano version ==
On November 27, 2019, a piano version arrived of the track was called the wedding version. Dan + Shay and Justin Bieber switched parts in the song as well, but the lyrics are the same.

== Credits and personnel ==
Credits adapted from Tidal.

- Dan Smyers – vocals, songwriter, producer, acoustic guitar, electric guitar, programmer, recording engineer, synthesizer
- Shay Mooney – vocals, songwriter
- Poo Bear – songwriter
- Justin Bieber – performer songwriter
- Jordan Reynolds – songwriter, acoustic guitar, bass, electric guitar, piano, programmer, synthesizer
- Jessie Jo Dillon – songwriter
- Abby Smyers – backing vocals
- Bryan Sutton – acoustic guitar, mandolin, resonator guitar
- Jeff Balding – engineer
- Josh Gudwin – additional engineer, vocal producer
- Josh Ditty – additional engineer
- Andrew Mendelson – masterer
- Jeff Juliano – mixer

== Awards and nominations ==
Year	Organization	Award	Result	Ref.
2020	iHeartRadio Music Awards	Best Lyrics	Won	
2020	American Music Awards	Collaboration of the Year	Won	
2020	American Music Awards	Favorite Country Song	Won	
2021	Grammy Awards	Best Country Duo/Group Performance	Won	

== Charts ==
=== Weekly charts ===
Chart (2019–2020)	Peak position
Australia (ARIA)	4
Austria (Ö3 Austria Top 40)	18
Belgium (Ultratop 50 Flanders)	25
Belgium (Ultratip Bubbling Under Wallonia)	2
Canada Hot 100 (Billboard)	2
Canada AC (Billboard)	2
Canada CHR/Top 40 (Billboard)	12
Canada Country (Billboard)	1
Canada Hot AC (Billboard)	8
Czech Republic Airplay (ČNS IFPI)	14
Czech Republic Singles Digital (ČNS IFPI)	16
Denmark (Tracklisten)	8
Germany (GfK)	47
Hungary (Single Top 40)	10
Hungary (Stream Top 40)	23
Ireland (IRMA)	17
Italy (FIMI)	85
Japan Hot 100 (Billboard)	34
Lithuania (AGATA)	26
Malaysia (RIM)	7
Mexico (Billboard Mexican Airplay)	18
Netherlands (Dutch Top 40)	11
Netherlands (Single Top 100)	21
New Zealand (Recorded Music NZ)	5
Norway (VG-lista)	9
Portugal (AFP)	55
Romania (Airplay 100)	54
Scotland Singles (OCC)	12
Singapore (RIAS)	6
Slovakia Airplay (ČNS IFPI)	12
Slovakia Singles Digital (ČNS IFPI)	13
Slovenia (SloTop50)	34
South Korea (Gaon)	172
Sweden (Sverigetopplistan)	13
Switzerland (Schweizer Hitparade)	21
UK Singles (OCC)	17
US Billboard Hot 100	4
US Adult Contemporary (Billboard)	6
US Adult Pop Airplay (Billboard)	4
US Country Airplay (Billboard)	1
US Hot Country Songs (Billboard)	1
US Dance/Mix Show Airplay (Billboard)	34
US Pop Airplay (Billboard)	9
US Rolling Stone Top 100	3

Chart (2023)	Peak position
South Korea (Circle)	111

=== Year-end charts ===
Chart (2019)	Position
Australia (ARIA)	94
Netherlands (Dutch Top 40)	67
Tokyo (Tokio Hot 100)	24
US Hot Country Songs (Billboard)	46

Chart (2020)	Position
Australia (ARIA)	66
Canada (Canadian Hot 100)	23
US Billboard Hot 100	23
US Adult Contemporary (Billboard)	12
US Adult Top 40 (Billboard)	17
US Country Airplay (Billboard)	37
US Hot Country Songs (Billboard)	3
US Mainstream Top 40 (Billboard)	33

Chart (2023)	Position
South Korea (Circle)	163

== Certifications ==
Region	Certification	Certified units/sales
Australia (ARIA)	2× Platinum	140,000^{‡}
Brazil (Pro-Música Brasil)	Gold	20,000^{‡}
Canada (Music Canada)	8× Platinum	640,000^{‡}
Denmark (IFPI Danmark)	Platinum	90,000^{‡}
New Zealand (RMNZ)	3× Platinum	90,000^{‡}
Norway (IFPI Norway)	Gold	30,000^{‡}
Portugal (AFP)	Gold	5,000^{‡}
Spain (Promusicae)	Gold	30,000^{‡}
United Kingdom (BPI)	Platinum	600,000^{‡}
United States (RIAA)	5× Platinum	5,000,000^{‡}
Streaming
Japan (RIAJ)	Platinum	100,000,000^{†}
Sweden (GLF)	Gold	4,000,000^{†}
^{‡} Sales+streaming figures based on certification alone.^{†} Streaming-only figures based on certification alone.

== Release history ==
Country	Date	Format	Label	Ref.
Various	October 4, 2019	Digital download; streaming	Warner Nashville	
United States	October 21, 2019	Hot adult contemporary	Warner Nashville	
United States	October 22, 2019	Contemporary hit radio	Warner Nashville	
