= Road Trippin' (Dan + Shay song) =

Single by Dan + Shay

from the album Obsessed
- Released: July 17, 2017
- Genre: Country pop
- Length: 3:33
- Label: Warner Bros. Nashville
- Songwriters: Dan Smyers; Shay Mooney; Martin Johnson
- Producers: Dan Smyers; Martin Johnson

Dan + Shay singles chronology
"How Not To" (2016)	"Road Trippin'" (2017)	"Tequila" (2018)

"Road Trippin'" is a song recorded by American country music duo Dan + Shay for their second studio album, Obsessed (2016). Group members Dan Smyers and Shay Mooney co-wrote the song with Martin Johnson, who co-produced the track with Smyers. "Road Trippin'" was selected as a single by a fan vote and released to country radio July 17, 2017 as the record's third and final single.

== Critical reception ==
Billy Dukes of Taste of Country complimented the song's carefree nature, writing "[Dan + Shay]'s enthusiasm for the story they're telling is undeniable, and that's what truly brings the song to life." Kelly Brickey of Sounds Like Nashville wrote that the song is a "head-swaying number" that seems "well on its way to driving up the charts."

== Chart performance ==
"Road Trippin'" debuted at number 52 on the Billboard Country Airplay chart dated August 12, 2017. The song peaked at number 42, becoming the group's first single to miss the top 40.

== Music video ==
Prior to the release of Obsessed, an "instant grat" video was released for "Road Trippin'" on May 6, 2016. The video, which was directed by PTracy, follows the duo and their friends as they hang out on a beach and drive down the highway in a convertible car.

== Charts ==
Chart (2017)	Peak position
US Country Airplay (Billboard)	42
