= I Should Probably Go to Bed =

2020 single by Dan + Shay

Single by Dan + Shay

from the album Good Things
- Released: July 31, 2020
- Genre: Pop, Country pop, Hip hop
- Length: 2:52
- Label: Warner Nashville
- Songwriter(s): Dan Smyers; Shay Mooney; Sean Douglas; Jason Evigan
- Producer(s): Dan Smyers

Dan + Shay singles chronology
"10,000 Hours" (2019)	"I Should Probably Go to Bed" (2020)	"Glad You Exist" (2021)

Alternative cover
- Cover art for live version performed at Ocean Way Nashville

Official music video
- "I Should Probably Go to Bed" on YouTube

Live video
- "I Should Probably Go to Bed" Live at Ocean Way Nashville on YouTube

"I Should Probably Go to Bed" is a song by American country pop duo Dan + Shay. It was released on July 31, 2020, as the second single from their fourth studio album, Good Things (2021). Duo members Dan Smyers and Shay Mooney wrote the song with Sean Douglas and Jason Evigan.

== Content ==
Dan + Shay announced the release of "I Should Probably Go to Bed" on July 31, 2020. The duo's members, Dan Smyers and Shay Mooney, wrote the song with Sean Douglas and Jason Evigan. Smyers also produced the song and played every instrument on it from his own house. Smyers told Rolling Stone that he had the song's title saved on his phone for months prior to the conception of the song. In production, Smyers included "orchestral synths and plaintive piano", as well as vocal harmonies between himself and Mooney.

== Personnel ==
Credits by AllMusic

- Shay Mooney – lead vocals, background vocals
- Abby Smyers – background vocals
- Dan Smyers – acoustic guitar, bass guitar, drums, piano, programming, strings, synthesizer, background vocals

== Chart performance ==
=== Weekly charts ===
Chart (2020–2021)	Peak position
Canada (Canadian Hot 100)	81
Canada AC (Billboard)	42
Canada Country (Billboard)	26
US Billboard Hot 100	28
US Adult Contemporary (Billboard)	26
US Adult Pop Airplay (Billboard)	11
US Country Airplay (Billboard)	2
US Hot Country Songs (Billboard)	4
US Rolling Stone Top 100	76

=== Year-end charts ===
Chart (2020)	Position
US Adult Top 40 (Billboard)	42
US Hot Country Songs (Billboard)	45

Chart (2021)	Position
US Country Airplay (Billboard)	54
US Hot Country Songs (Billboard)	57

== Certifications ==
Region	Certification	Certified units/sales
Canada (Music Canada)	Platinum	80,000^{‡}
United States (RIAA)	2× Platinum	2,000,000^{‡}
^{‡} Sales+streaming figures based on certification alone.
