= From the Ground Up (song) =

Single by Dan + Shay

from the album Obsessed
- Released: February 6, 2016
- Recorded: 2015, Ocean Waves Studios (Nashville, Tennessee)
- Genre: Country
- Length: 4:14
- Label: Warner Bros. Nashville
- Songwriters: Dan Smyers; Shay Mooney; Chris DeStefano
- Producers: Dan Smyers; Scott Hendricks

Dan + Shay singles chronology
"Nothin' Like You" (2015)	"From the Ground Up" (2016)	"How Not To" (2016)

"From the Ground Up" is a song written and recorded by American country music duo Dan + Shay for their second studio album, Obsessed (2016). It was released to digital retailers on February 6, 2016, through Warner Bros. Nashville as the album's lead single and impacted American country radio on February 22, 2016. "From the Ground Up" was co-written by Chris DeStefano and was produced by group member Dan Smyers with Scott Hendricks.

The song's accompanying music video, released concurrently on February 5, was directed by Shaun Silva. Prior to its official radio release, "From the Ground Up" debuted at number 37 on the Billboard Country Airplay chart dated February 20, 2016 as the week's hot shot debut and most-added single. It has since become their second consecutive single to top the chart.

== Background and composition ==
"From the Ground Up" is a country ballad written by Dan Smyers, Shay Mooney, and Chris DeStefano about finding true love and building a life together with that person. Inspired by the love shared by the duo member's respective grandparents, the song was written shortly after Dan lost his grandfather and while Shay's was in the hospital, and has been described by the duo as "the most special song we've ever written." The song was recorded at Ocean Waves Studios in Nashville, Tennessee and features a string section, Gordon Mote on piano, Bryan Sutton on guitar, and Nir Z on drums.

== Critical reception ==
Markos Papadatos of Digital Journal rated the song an A, writing that "both Dan and Shay soar on harmonies" and that the song will be popular at weddings.

== Commercial performance ==
"From the Ground Up" first entered the Country Airplay chart of February 20, 2016 at No. 37, and then debuted on the Hot Country Songs chart at No. 23 the following week when it was made available for download, selling 21,000 copies in its first week. The song reached No. 1 on the Country Airplay chart in August 2016, their second consecutive No. 1 on the chart. It peaked at number three on Hot Country Songs, making it their highest-charting single on that chart. "From the Ground Up" also debuted at number 18 on the Bubbling Under Hot 100 chart dated February 27, 2016 and spent eleven weeks on the chart, reaching a peak of six. It debuted at number 90 on the Billboard Hot 100 chart dated June 11, 2016. The song reached a peak position of 48 on the chart dated August 6, 2016, becoming the duo's second top-50 single. It was certified triple platinum by RIAA on May 9, 2024. The song has sold 607,000 copies in the US as of January 2017.

In Canada, the song debuted at number 49 on the Country airplay chart dated May 21, 2016. It reached a peak position of 10 on the chart dated August 27, 2016. On the Canadian Hot 100, the song debuted and peaked at number 77 on the chart dated August 6, 2016 and remained on the chart for a single week. In August 2023, the single was certified 2× Platinum by Music Canada, indicating sales of over 160,000 units.

The song has been covered by a number of YouTubers and fans, including the all male Irish singing group, Celtic Thunder. The song is featured on their 2017 CD titled "Inspirational".

== Music video ==
The music video for "From the Ground Up" was directed by Shaun Silva and premiered February 5, 2016. Alternating between scenes of the past and present, the video depicts a grandmother sharing stories of her younger years and wedding to her granddaughter as the younger woman plans a wedding of her own, and centers around the concept of lasting love.

== Personnel ==
Dan + Shay

- Shay Mooney — lead vocals, background vocals
- Dan Smyers — electric guitar, background vocals

Additional musicians

- Jessica Blackwell — violin
- Charles Dixon — violin
- Elisabeth Lamb — viola
- Gordon Mote — piano, string arrangements
- Emily Nelson — cello
- Russ Pahl — pedal steel guitar
- Jimmie Lee Sloas — bass guitar
- Bryan Sutton — acoustic guitar
- Derek Wells — electric guitar
- Nir Z — drums, percussion, programming

== Charts ==
=== Weekly charts ===
Chart (2016)	Peak position
Canada Hot 100 (Billboard)	77
Canada Country (Billboard)	10
US Billboard Hot 100	48
US Country Airplay (Billboard)	1
US Hot Country Songs (Billboard)	3

=== Year end charts ===
Chart (2016)	Position
US Country Airplay (Billboard)	17
US Hot Country Songs (Billboard)	12

== Certifications and sales ==
Region	Certification	Certified units/sales
Canada (Music Canada)	2× Platinum	160,000^{‡}
United States (RIAA)	3× Platinum	3,000,000^{‡}
^{‡} Sales+streaming figures based on certification alone.

== Release history ==
Country	Date	Format	Label	Ref.
Worldwide	February 5, 2016	Digital download	Warner Bros. Nashville	
United States	February 22, 2016	Country radio	Warner Bros. Nashville	
