= Good Things (Dan + Shay album) =

Studio album by Dan + Shay
- Released: August 13, 2021
- Length: 32:42
- Label: Warner Nashville
- Producer: Dan Smyers; Jason Evigan; Jordan Reynolds; Scott Hendricks

Dan + Shay chronology
Dan + Shay (2018)	Good Things (2021)	Bigger Houses (2023)

Singles from Good Things
- 1. "10,000 Hours" Released: October 4, 2019; 2. "I Should Probably Go to Bed" Released: July 31, 2020; 3. "Glad You Exist" Released: February 5, 2021; 4. "Steal My Love" Released: August 16, 2021; 5. "You" Released: July 18, 2022

Good Things is the fourth studio album by American country duo Dan + Shay. It was released on August 13, 2021, through Warner Bros. Records Nashville. The album contains a sole guest appearance from Canadian singer Justin Bieber. The production is primarily handled by duo member Dan Smyers, who produced every track, along with Jason Evigan, Scott Hendricks, and Jordan Reynolds also being producers. The album was supported by five singles: "10,000 Hours" with Bieber, "I Should Probably Go to Bed", "Glad You Exist", "Steal My Love", and "You". It was also preceded by two promotional singles: the title and opening track, and "Lying". It is a country pop album.

== Singles and promotion ==
The album's lead single, "10,000 Hours", a collaboration with Canadian singer Justin Bieber, was released on October 4, 2019. The song was solely produced by Dan Smyers. The official music video premiered on the duo's YouTube channel the same day. The song peaked at number four on the Billboard Hot 100 and peaked at number two on the Canadian Hot 100. It was certified 3× platinum by the Recording Industry Association of America (RIAA) and certified 5× platinum by Music Canada.

The second single, "I Should Probably Go to Bed", their first release of 2020, was released on July 31, 2020. The song was solely produced by Smyers and an acoustic version was released on October 14, 2020. The official music video and the lyric video debuted alongside the song. The song peaked at number 28 on the Billboard Hot 100. It was certified platinum by the RIAA.

The third single, "Glad You Exist", their first release of 2021, was released on February 5, 2021. The song was solely produced by Smyers and an acoustic version was released on April 15, 2021. The lyric video debuted alongside the song. The song peaked at number 35 on the Billboard Hot 100. It was certified gold by the RIAA.

On July 14, 2021, Dan + Shay announced that a special announcement would be made the following day, with the header, "good things are coming". The following day, the album was announced with the cover, tracklist, and pre-order, along with the title and opening track being released as a promotional single. The official music video debuted five hours after the song, on July 16, 2021. "Lying" was released on July 29, 2021, as the album's second and final promotional single.

"Steal My Love" was released to country radio on August 16, 2021, as the fourth single off the album.

"You" was released on July 18, 2022, as the fifth and final single from the album.

== Track listing ==
Good Things track listing
No.	Title	Writer(s)	Producer(s)	Length
1.	"Good Things"	Dan Smyers; Jason Evigan; Ashley Gorley; Ross Copperman	Smyers; Evigan	2:28
2.	"Steal My Love"	Smyers; Gorley; Andy Albert; Jordan Reynolds	Smyers	2:42
3.	"You"	Smyers; Dave Barnes; Reynolds	Smyers; Scott Hendricks	3:16
4.	"Body Language"	Smyers; Shay Mooney; Shawn Mendes; Scott Harris; Reynolds	Smyers; Hendricks	2:24
5.	"Give in to You"	Smyers; Julia Michaels; Reynolds	Smyers; Reynolds^{[a]}	2:23
6.	"Irresponsible"	Smyers; Mooney; Michaels; Reynolds	Smyers; Hendricks	2:43
7.	"Lying"	Smyers; Mooney; Albert; Bill Withers; Reynolds	Smyers	2:26
8.	"One Direction"	Smyers; Mooney; Albert; Reynolds	Smyers	3:17
9.	"Let Me Get Over Her"	Smyers; Mooney; Albert; Jordan Schmidt; Kyle Fishman; Brandon Tursi	Smyers; Hendricks	3:02
10.	"Glad You Exist"	Smyers; Mooney; Tayla Parx; Ryan Lewis; Reynolds	Smyers	2:24
11.	"10,000 Hours" (with Justin Bieber)	Smyers; Mooney; Bieber; Jason Boyd; Jessie Jo Dillon; Reynolds	Smyers; Josh Gudwin^{[b]}	2:47
12.	"I Should Probably Go to Bed"	Smyers; Mooney; Evigan; Sean Douglas	Smyers	2:50
Total length:				32:42

=== Notes ===
- ^{^[a]} signifies a co-producer.
- ^{^[b]} signifies a vocal producer.
- "Lying" interpolates "Lean on Me", written and performed by Bill Withers.

== Personnel ==
=== Dan + Shay ===
- Dan Smyers – vocals (all tracks), programming (all tracks), vocal recording (3), acoustic guitar (5, 11, 12), piano (6, 10, 12), strings (6, 12), recording (6, 10, 11), synthesizing (6, 8, 10–12), transcribing (6), bass (10, 12), drums (10, 12), electric guitar (11), engineering (12)
- Shay Mooney – vocals (all tracks)

=== Other musicians and technical ===
- Jeff Juliano – mixing (all tracks)
- Andrew Mendelson – mastering (all tracks)
- Jason Evigan – programming (1, 4), synthesizing (1)
- Abby Smyers – background vocals (1, 10, 11, 12)
- Bryan Sutton – acoustic guitar (1, 3, 4, 6–8, 10, 11), mandolin (1, 4, 6, 7, 11), Dobro (1, 7), resonator guitar (11)
- Derek Wells – electric guitar (1–4, 6–9)
- Jimmie Lee Sloas – bass (1–4, 6–9)
- Gordon Mote – piano (1–4, 6–9), Hammond B3 organ (2, 3, 7)
- Nir Z – drums (1–4, 6–9), percussion (1–4, 6–9)
- Brian David Willis – digital editing (1–9)
- Ryan Yount – engineering assistant (1), recording assistant (2, 7–9)
- Dave Cook – mixing assistant (1–9)
- Eric Kirkland – mixing assistant (1–9)
- Jeff Balding – recording (1–4, 6–9), engineering (11)
- Lionel Crasta – recording (1)
- Rafael Fadul – recording (1)
- Jordan Reynolds – programming (4, 7, 11), bass (5, 11), electric guitar (5, 11), piano (5, 11), synthesizing (5, 11), recording (5), acoustic guitar (11)
- Ilya Toshinskiy – acoustic guitar (2, 9), ukulele (2)
- Scott Hendricks – recording (6)
- Joel McKenney – mixing assistant (3)
- Wendy Moten – background vocals (3)
- Jason Eskridge – background vocals (3)
- Kyla Jade – background vocals (3)
- Robert Bailey – background vocals (3)
- Samson White – background vocals (3)
- Vicki Hampton – background vocals (3)
- Lauren Adams – recording assistant (3, 6, 8, 9)
- Tate Sablatura – recording assistant (3, 6), engineering assistant (4)
- Julia Michaels – background vocals (5)
- Mike Rinne – bass (5, 8)
- Nick Gold – cello (5, 8, 9)
- Una O'Riordan – cello (5, 8)
- Charlie Judge – string arrangement (5, 8, 9)
- Allison Gooding Hoffman – violin (5, 8, 9)
- Christina McGann – violin (5, 8)
- Johna Smith – violin (5, 8, 9)
- Louise Morrison – violin (5, 8)
- Charles Dixon – viola (5, 8, 9), contracting (5, 8, 9), copying (5, 8, 9)
- Betsy Lamb – viola (5, 8, 9)
- Michael Walter – recording assistant (5, 8, 9)
- Aubrey Haynie – fiddle (6)
- Craig Nelson – bass (9)
- Kevin Bate – cello (9)
- Jung-Min Shin – violin (9)
- Mary Kathryn Von Osdale – violin (9)
- Alan Umstead – contracting (9)
- Nick Spezia – recording (9)
- Josh Ditty – additional engineering (10, 11)
- Justin Bieber – vocals (11)
- Josh Gudwin – additional engineering (11)
- Chris "TEK" O'Ryan – additional vocal recording engineering (11)

== Charts ==
=== Weekly charts ===
Weekly chart performance for Good Things
Chart (2021)	Peak position
Australian Albums (ARIA)	28
Canadian Albums (Billboard)	12
UK Country Albums (OCC)	4
US Billboard 200	6
US Top Country Albums (Billboard)	2

=== Year-end charts ===
2021 year-end chart performance for Good Things
Chart (2021)	Position
Australian Country Albums (ARIA)	42
US Top Country Albums (Billboard)	51

2022 year-end chart performance for Good Things
Chart (2022)	Position
US Top Country Albums (Billboard)	46

== Certifications ==
Certifications for Good Things
Region	Certification	Certified units/sales
Canada (Music Canada)	Platinum	80,000^{‡}
New Zealand (RMNZ)	Gold	7,500^{‡}
United States (RIAA)	Platinum	1,000,000^{‡}
^{‡} Sales+streaming figures based on certification alone.

== Release history ==
Release history for Good Things
Region	Date	Format(s)	Label	Ref.
Various	August 13, 2021	Digital download; streaming	Warner Nashville	
