= Good Things (Dan + Shay song) =

2021 single by Dan + Shay

Promotional single by Dan + Shay

from the album Good Things
- Released: July 15, 2021
- Genre: Pop rock
- Length: 2:28
- Label: Warner Nashville
- Songwriters: Dan Smyers; Jason Evigan; Ashley Gorley; Ross Copperman
- Producers: Dan Smyers; Jason Evigan

Music video
- "Good Things" on YouTube

"Good Things" is a song by American country pop duo Dan + Shay. It was released as a promotional single from their fourth studio album of the same name on July 15, 2021. The song is produced by Dan Smyers and Jason Evigan, and written by the two of them along with Ashley Gorley and Ross Copperman.

== Background ==
On July 14, 2021, Dan + Shay announced that a special announcement would be revealed the following day. The single was released along with the announcement, which would turn out to be about the album.

== Music video ==
The official music video was released five hours after the song on July 16, 2021.

== Credits and personnel ==
Credits adapted from Tidal.

=== Dan + Shay ===
- Dan Smyers – vocals, production, songwriting, programming
- Shay Mooney – vocals, songwriting

=== Other musicians and technical ===
- Jason Evigan – production, songwriting, programming, synthesing
- Ashley Gorley – songwriting
- Ross Copperman – songwriting
- Rohan Kohli – executive production
- Abby Smyers – background vocals
- Bryan Sutton – acoustic guitar, mandolin, dobro
- Derek Wells – electric guitar
- Jimmie Lee Sloas – bass
- Gordon Mote – piano
- Nir Z – drums, percussion
- Brian David Willis – digital editing
- Ryan Yount – assistant engineering
- Jeff Juliano – mixing
- Dave Cook – assistant mixing
- Eric Kirkland – assistant mixing
- Andrew Mendelson – mastering
- Jeff Balding – recording

== Charts ==
Chart performance for "Good Things"
| Chart (2021) | Peak position |
|---|---|
| US Hot Country Songs (Billboard) | 31 |

== Certifications ==
Certifications for "Good Things"
| Region | Certification | Certified units/sales |
|---|---|---|
| Canada (Music Canada) | Gold | 40,000^{‡} |
^{‡} Sales+streaming figures based on certification alone.
