= It's Officially Christmas: The Double Album =

Studio album by Dan + Shay
- Released: October 18, 2024
- Recorded: 2024
- Studios: Abby Road Studios, Ocean Way Nashville, Warner Music Nashville, Sound Emporium Studios, Front Stage Studio and Blackbird Studio (Nashville, Tennessee); Hound's Ear Studio (Franklin, Tennessee)
- Genres: Christmas; country
- Length: 61:00
- Label: Warner Nashville
- Producers: Dan Smyers; Scott Hendricks

Dan + Shay chronology
Bigger Houses (2023)	It's Officially Christmas: The Double Album (2024)	Young (2026)

It's Officially Christmas: The Double Album is the sixth studio album and first Christmas album by American country duo Dan + Shay. The double album was released on October 18, 2024, by Warner Music Nashville. The first disc is Christmas standards and the second disc is all new original music.

== Background and composition ==
On October 17, 2024, Dan + Shay announced their first Christmas album which was released the next day at midnight.

The first disc is all Christmas standards and the second disc is all new original Christmas music. Dan Smyers wrote on all eleven tracks, Shay Mooney wrote on five.

== Release and promotion ==
It's Officially Christmas: The Double Album was released on October 18, 2024, by Warner Nashville. They performed "It's Officially Christmas" during Macy's Thanksgiving Day Parade on November 28, 2024. On December 4, 2024, they performed "Take Me Home for Christmas" and "Save The Snowman" on The Today Show; "Rockin' Around the Christmas Tree" and "Pick Out a Christmas Tree" during NBC's Christmas in Rockefeller; and "The Cozy Song" on The Tonight Show Starring Jimmy Fallon. On December 9, 2024, they will perform "Take Me Home For Christmas" and "Pick Out a Christmas Tree" during the season 26 finale The Voice.

At Universal Studios Japan, the song "Officially Christmas" will be used in the winter season show "Light Up the Night ~Christmas Celebration~" starting in 2025.

== Track listing ==
Disc one
No.	Title	Writer(s)	Length
1.	"It's the Most Wonderful Time of the Year"	Edward Pola; George Wyle	2:44
2.	"Rockin' Around the Christmas Tree"	Johnny Marks	1:52
3.	"Santa Claus Is Comin' to Town"	J. Fred Coots; Haven Gillespie	2:43
4.	"Let It Snow"	Jule Styne; Sammy Cahn	2:03
5.	"The Christmas Song"	Robert Wells; Mel Tormé	3:52
6.	"Winter Wonderland"	Felix Bernard; Richard Bernhard Smith	2:15
7.	"Jingle Bell Rock"	Joe Beal; Jim Boothe	2:13
8.	"Have Yourself a Merry Little Christmas"	Hugh Martin; Ralph Blane	2:32
9.	"Christmas (Baby Please Come Home)"	Jeff Barry; Ellie Greenwich; Phil Spector	2:52
10.	"Silent Night"	Franz Xaver Gruber; Joseph Mohr	3:24

Disc two
No.	Title	Writer(s)	Length
1.	"Officially Christmas"	Dan Smyers; Nicolle Galyon; Dave Barnes; Jordan Reynolds	2:58
2.	"Take Me Home for Christmas"	Smyers; Reynolds; Shay Mooney; Andy Albert; Mitchell Tenpenny; Jordan Schmidt	3:23
3.	"Save the Snowman"	Smyers; Mooney	3:38
4.	"Holiday Party"	Smyers; Reynolds; Albert	3:00
5.	"The Cozy Song"	Smyers; Mooney; Reynolds	2:17
6.	"Pick Out a Christmas Tree"	Smyers; Galyon; Barnes; Reynolds	2:28
7.	"Parson Brown"	Smyers; Mooney; Reynolds	2:54
8.	"Christmas Isn't Christmas"	Smyers; Mooney; Reynolds; Albert	3:16
9.	"Blame It on Santa"	Smyers	3:31
10.	"Break Up on Christmas"	Smyers	3:26
11.	"Happy New Year"	Smyers	3:45
Total length:			61:00

== Personnel ==
Dan + Shay

- Shay Mooney – vocals (all tracks)
- Dan Smyers – vocals (all tracks), programming (1–3, 6–9, 11–21), glockenspiel (1, 20, 21), synthesizers (11, 12, 14, 16, 19, 21), organ (19, 20), keyboards (20)

Additional musicians

- Jimmy Bowland – saxophones (1, 3, 9), clarinet (4), flute (4)
- Mark Douthit – saxophones (1–4, 11, 16)
- Cody Fry – programming (11, 16), horn arrangements (11, 16)
- Barry Green – trombone (1, 3, 4, 11, 16)
- Charlie Judge – programming (1–7, 9, 13, 18, 21), horn arrangements (1, 3, 4, 9), Hammond B3 organ (9)
- Gordon Mote – acoustic piano (1–9, 11–21), Hammond B3 organ (3, 9, 13, 15, 19, 20), Wurlitzer electric piano (17)
- Craig Nelson – bass (1–9, 13, 15, 17, 19–21)
- Nir Z – drums (1–7, 9, 11–21), percussion (1–3, 6, 7, 9, 11, 12, 14, 16, 18–20)
- Russ Pahl – steel guitar (13, 19–21)
- Steve Patrick – trumpet (1, 3, 11, 16), flugelhorn (17)
- Jovan Quallo – saxophones (11, 16)
- Danny Rader – acoustic guitar (11, 16), electric guitar (16)
- Jordan Reynolds – synthesizers (12), programming (12), electric guitar (17)
- Jason Roller – electric guitar (1–7, 9)
- Jimmie Lee Sloas – bass (11, 12, 14, 16, 18)
- Bryan Sutton – acoustic guitar (12, 14, 18)
- Ilya Toshinsky – acoustic guitar (1–9, 13, 15, 17, 19–21), mandolin (11), banjo (17)
- Derek Wells – electric guitar (11–16, 18–21)

String sections

- Carolyn Bailey – violin (1, 2, 4–7, 9, 13, 21)
- Razvan Berindean – viola (1, 2, 4–7, 9, 13, 21)
- Jessica Blackwell – violin (1, 2, 4–7, 9, 13, 21)
- Chuck Callahan – violin (11)
- Bobby Chase – viola (11)
- Eleonore Denig – violin (11)
- Charles Dixon – violin (18)
- Alicia Enstrom – violin (1, 2, 4–7, 9, 13, 21)
- Laura Epling – violin (11)
- Cara Fox – cello (11)
- Cody Fry – string arrangements (16)
- Nicholas Gold – cello (1, 2, 4–7, 9, 13, 18, 21)
- Erin Hall – violin (18)
- Grace Hartman – cello (18)
- Alison Hoffman – violin (1, 2, 4–7, 9, 13, 21)
- Jun Iwasaki – violin (18)
- Veronica Joines – violin (11)
- Charlie Judge – string arrangements (1, 2, 4–7, 9, 13, 18, 21)
- Katelyn Kelly – violin (11)
- Annaliese Kowert – violin (1, 2, 4–7, 9, 13, 21)
- Anthony LaMarchina – cello (8)
- Betsy Lamb – viola (1, 2, 4–7, 9, 13, 18, 21)
- Cassie Morrow – violin (11)
- Emily Nelson Rodgers – cello (11)
- Anthony Parce – viola (18)
- Tim Pearson – double bass (8)
- Carole Rabinowitz – cello (8)
- Sarighani Reist – cello (1, 2, 4–7, 9, 13, 21)
- Buddy Skipper – string arrangements (8)
- Kristin Weber – violin (11)

Production

- Kirsten Atkinson – grooming
- Jeff Balding – engineer (1–9, 11–21)
- Andrew Cook – design, layout
- Dave Cook – mix assistant (11, 14, 16)
- Scott Hendricks – producer
- Jeff Juliano – mixing (11, 12, 14, 16, 18)
- Eric Kirkland – mix assistant (11, 16)
- Rohan Kohli – A&R
- Amber Lehman – stylist
- Andrew Mendelson – mastering at Georgetown Masters (Nashville, Tennessee)
- Joel McKenney – assistant engineer (12, 18)
- Mike Moore – photo editing
- Justin Niebank – mixing (1–10, 13, 15, 17, 19–21)
- Jason Owen – management
- David Paulin – assistant engineer (11, 16)
- Lisa Ray – management
- Tate Sablatura – assistant engineer (18)
- Dan Smyers – producer, engineer, design, layout, photo editing
- Joey Stanca – assistant engineer (11, 16)
- Clark Mims Tedesco – artist development
- Patrick Tracy – creative director, design, layout, photo editing
- Michael Walter – assistant engineer (1–9, 11, 13–17, 19, 20)
- Williams + Hirakawa – photography
- Brian David Willis – digital editing

== Charts ==
=== Weekly charts ===
Weekly chart performance for It's Officially Christmas: The Double Album
Chart (2024–2025)	Peak position
US Billboard 200	88
US Top Country Albums (Billboard)	14

=== Year-end charts ===
Year-end chart performance for It's Officially Christmas: The Double Album
Chart (2025)	Position
US Top Country Albums (Billboard)	75
