= How Not To =

Single by Dan + Shay

from the album Obsessed
- Released: September 26, 2016
- Recorded: 2015
- Studio: Ocean Waves Studios (Nashville, Tennessee)
- Genre: Country
- Length: 3:13
- Label: Warner Bros. Nashville
- Songwriter(s): Adam Hambrick; Paul DiGiovanni; Kevin Bard
- Producer(s): Dan Smyers; Scott Hendricks

Dan + Shay singles chronology
"From the Ground Up" (2016)	"How Not To" (2016)	"Road Trippin'" (2017)

Music video
- "How Not To" on YouTube

"How Not To" is a song recorded by American country music duo Dan + Shay for their second studio album, Obsessed (2016). Written by Adam Hambrick, Paul DiGiovanni, and Kevin Bard, the song is one of only two tracks on the album not co-written by Dan and Shay. A mid-tempo country ballad, the song is about the struggle to move on from a breakup, only for those emotions about the former lover to come back. It was released to country radio September 26, 2016 through Warner Bros. Nashville as the album's second single. The song received positive reviews from critics, who generally praised the duo's vocal performances.

"How Not To" gave the duo their third consecutive number-one hit on the Billboard Country Airplay chart. It also peaked at numbers 7 and 57 on both the Hot Country Songs and Hot 100 charts respectively. The song was certified Gold by the Recording Industry Association of America (RIAA), and has sold 158,000 copies as of July 2017. It also charted in Canada, reaching number 25 on the Canada Country chart. Two music videos were made for the song: an "instant grat" where a couple performs an interpretive dance that symbolizes the story from the track, and an official one where actors Katie Stevens and Pierson Fodé portray recovering alcoholics falling in love with each other.

== Composition ==
"How Not To" is a country music song written by Adam Hambrick, Paul DiGiovanni, and Kevin Bard and produced by Dan Smyers and Scott Hendricks. It is a midtempo ballad with melodic verses that build into a bigger chorus and is instrumented by piano and electric guitar. The song's hook is accentuated by a "melodic lift." The lyrics describe the difficulty of moving on after a breakup when the narrator's emotions keep drawing him back to that person.

== Critical reception ==
In a review of Obsessed, Annie Reuter of Sounds Like Nashville wrote that "their ability to translate the emotion in a song they didn’t write like 'How Not To' is the sign of a true artist," and described the song as "poignant." The staff of country music blog Taste of Country praised the vocal performances on the song and called it a likely hit. "Dan + Shay aren't really breaking any new musical ground here," they write, "but wow, do they sound sweet not doing it."

== Commercial performance ==
"How Not To" was the most-added new single on country radio the week of its impact. The song debuted at number 59 on the Billboard Country Airplay chart dated October 15, 2016. It reached number one on the chart dated July 1, 2017. "How Not To" debuted at number 50 on the Hot Country Songs chart dated October 29, 2016. It reached a peak of 7 on the chart dated July 1, 2017. The song has sold 158,000 copies in the US as of July 2017.

== Music video ==
An "instant grat" video accompanying the song was uploaded to the duo's official YouTube channel on May 20, 2016 in promotion of the song's then-upcoming parent album. It features a couple (Lily Molina and Jesse Pattison) engaged in an interpretive dance that is meant to symbolize the break-up story told in the lyrics.

The official music video for the song was directed by Patrick Tracy and premiered January 16, 2017. Starring Katie Stevens and Pierson Fodé as recovering alcoholics Sophie and Noah, respectively, the video follows the pair as they succumb to self-destructive behavior and fall in love on their journey back to sobriety. The video begins with an Alcoholics Anonymous meeting, where the pair first meet and bond. Most of the video is framed as a flashback, showing how their addiction got the best of each of them and began negatively affecting their day-to-day life. Towards the end, the video shows a one-year sober party for the couple, who celebrate their recovery with a gathering of friends, including Dan and Shay. According to Amanda Wicks of Radio.com, the clip "[looks] at how love can save lives;" critics also noted a more "serious" tone compared to the duo's previous videos and praised the video's storyline for imbuing "new meaning" into the lyrics beyond simple relationship drama.

== Live performances ==
The duo appeared on an episode of Jimmy Kimmel Live! on September 29, 2016 and performed the song.

== Charts and certifications ==
=== Weekly charts ===
Chart (2016–2017)	Peak position
Canada Country (Billboard)	25
US Billboard Hot 100	57
US Country Airplay (Billboard)	1
US Hot Country Songs (Billboard)	7

=== Year-end charts ===
Chart (2017)	Position
US Billboard Country Airplay	21
US Billboard Hot Country Songs	26

=== Certifications ===
Region	Certification	Certified units/sales
Canada (Music Canada)	Platinum	80,000^{‡}
United States (RIAA)	Platinum	1,000,000^{‡}
^{‡} Sales+streaming figures based on certification alone.
