= Glad You Exist =

2021 single by Dan + Shay

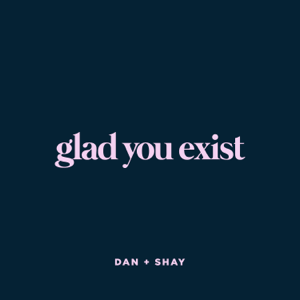

Single by Dan + Shay

from the album Good Things
- Released: February 5, 2021
- Genre: Country pop
- Length: 2:25
- Label: Warner Nashville
- Songwriter(s): Dan Smyers; Shay Mooney; Tayla Parx; Ryan Lewis; Jordan Reynolds
- Producer(s): Dan Smyers

Dan + Shay singles chronology
"I Should Probably Go to Bed" (2020)	"Glad You Exist" (2021)	"Steal My Love" (2021)

Lyric video
- "Glad You Exist" on YouTube

"Glad You Exist" is a song by American country pop duo Dan + Shay. It was released as the third single from their fourth studio album, Good Things on February 5, 2021. The members of the duo, Dan Smyers and Shay Mooney wrote the song along with Tayla Parx, Ryan Lewis, and Jordan Reynolds, the former of who produced it.

== Background ==
On February 2, 2021, Dan + Shay explained the meaning of the song with a note through an Instagram post:

to us, glad you exist is more than just a song. it's a message of gratitude and hope. a message to everyone in our lives: our fans, our friends, our families, to remind them all how grateful we are to be on the planet at the same time. it's truly remarkable when you think about it. we've spent the majority of the past year, like many others, searching for answers and a sense of normalcy, but finding comfort in memories of better days (that we all know will return soon). concerts, bonfires, road trips with friends, even the simple things like date night at a restaurant, or beers at a bar during a football game. this song has taken on new meaning not being able to see our loved ones in person, but throughout history, music has always had a special way of bringing people together, even when we are furthest apart. these words hold a special place in our hearts, and hopefully they will in yours too. we've said it before, and we'll say it again (and again). we're just so glad you exist. every. single. one of you.

Speaking about the song, Dan Smyers told The Country Daily that he had the phrase "glad you exist" to be appreciative of his wife Abby Smyers and to be grateful that she is living in the same time that he is living. He brought it to Shay Mooney and the two were thinking of ideas, wanting to create a gratitude song about their friends, family, and fans.

== Critical reception ==
Tomás Mier of People described the song as a "sweet, pop-country track" and that "the upbeat pop-infused track and its positive lyrics provide for the perfect optimistic soundtrack of 2021." CMT's Jessica Nicholson theorized that the duo was influenced by the loneliness of the COVID-19 pandemic to create the song and "it has also led many to find greater appreciation for the people they have in their lives.

== Credits and personnel ==
Credits adapted from Tidal.

Dan + Shay

- Dan Smyers – bass guitar, drums, piano, synthesizer, background vocals, production, programming, recording, songwriting
- Shay Mooney – lead vocals, background vocals, songwriting

Other musicians and technical

- Abby Smyers – background vocals
- Bryan Sutton – acoustic guitar
- Jeff Juliano – mixing
- Andrew Mendelson – mastering
- Josh Ditty – additional engineering

== Charts ==
=== Weekly charts ===
Weekly chart performance for "Glad You Exist"
Chart (2021)	Peak position
Canada (Canadian Hot 100)	45
Canada Country (Billboard)	8
Global 200 (Billboard)	105
US Billboard Hot 100	21
US Country Airplay (Billboard)	1
US Hot Country Songs (Billboard)	2

=== Year-end charts ===
Year-end chart performance for "Glad You Exist"
Chart (2021)	Position
US Billboard Hot 100	64
US Country Airplay (Billboard)	16
US Hot Country Songs (Billboard)	10

== Certifications ==
Certifications for "Glad You Exist"
Region	Certification	Certified units/sales
Canada (Music Canada)	2× Platinum	160,000^{‡}
New Zealand (RMNZ)	Gold	15,000^{‡}
United States (RIAA)	2× Platinum	2,000,000^{‡}
^{‡} Sales+streaming figures based on certification alone.
