= 19 You + Me =

Single by Dan + Shay

from the album Where It All Began
- Released: October 14, 2013
- Recorded: 2013
- Genre: Country pop
- Length: 3:37
- Label: Warner Bros. Nashville
- Songwriters: Dan Smyers; Shay Mooney; Danny Orton
- Producers: Dan Smyers; Scott Hendricks; Danny Orton

Dan + Shay singles chronology
"19 You + Me" (2013)	"Show You Off" (2014)

"19 You + Me" is the debut single by American country music duo Dan + Shay. It was released in October 2013 as the first single from their debut album for Warner Bros. Nashville. The album, Where It All Began, was released on April 1, 2014. The song was written by Dan + Shay and Danny Orton. It received 59 adds in its first week at country radio, becoming the most added debut single of 2013.

"19 You + Me" peaked at numbers 7 and 11 on both the Billboard Hot Country Songs and Country Airplay charts respectively. It also reached outside the top 40 of the Hot 100 at number 42. The song was certified double platinum by the Recording Industry Association of America (RIAA), and has sold 720,000 units in the United States as of October 2014. It received similar chart success in Canada, reaching number 23 on the Country chart and number 47 on the Canadian Hot 100.

== Critical reception ==
The song received a positive review from Taste of Country which praised the "warm details" and "emotion." It said that "young artists aren't often able to tell stories as effectively as those with a little more age, but Dan Smyers and Shay Mooney can count on vivid lyrics to help them through." It went on to say that "the instrumentation is country with pop leanings" and "they add some missing sensitivity to the current landscape."

== Music video ==
The music video was directed by Brian Lazzaro and shot in Myrtle Beach, South Carolina, in which they mention Myrtle Beach in the song. Some of the locations they shot at were the Fun Plaza arcade on Ocean Blvd and the Myrtle Beach Boardwalk.

== Commercial performance ==
"19 You + Me" debuted at number 55 on the US Billboard Country Airplay chart for the week of October 26, 2013. It also debuted at number 49 on the US Billboard Hot Country Songs chart for the week of November 9, 2013. The song debuted at number 96 on the US Billboard Hot 100 chart for the week of January 18, 2014. As of October 2014, the song has sold 720,000 copies in the United States. On May 9, 2024, the song was certified double platinum by the Recording Industry Association of America (RIAA) for sales of over two million digital copies in the United States.

"19 You + Me" was certified Platinum by Music Canada in August 2023.

== Charts ==
=== Weekly charts ===
Chart (2013–2014)	Peak position
Canada Hot 100 (Billboard)	47
Canada Country (Billboard)	23
US Billboard Hot 100	42
US Country Airplay (Billboard)	11
US Hot Country Songs (Billboard)	7

=== Year-end charts ===
Chart (2014)	Position
US Country Airplay (Billboard)	54
US Hot Country Songs (Billboard)	42

== Certifications ==
Region	Certification	Certified units/sales
Canada (Music Canada)	Platinum	80,000^{‡}
United States (RIAA)	2× Platinum	2,000,000^{‡}
^{‡} Sales+streaming figures based on certification alone.
