= Dan + Shay =

American country duo

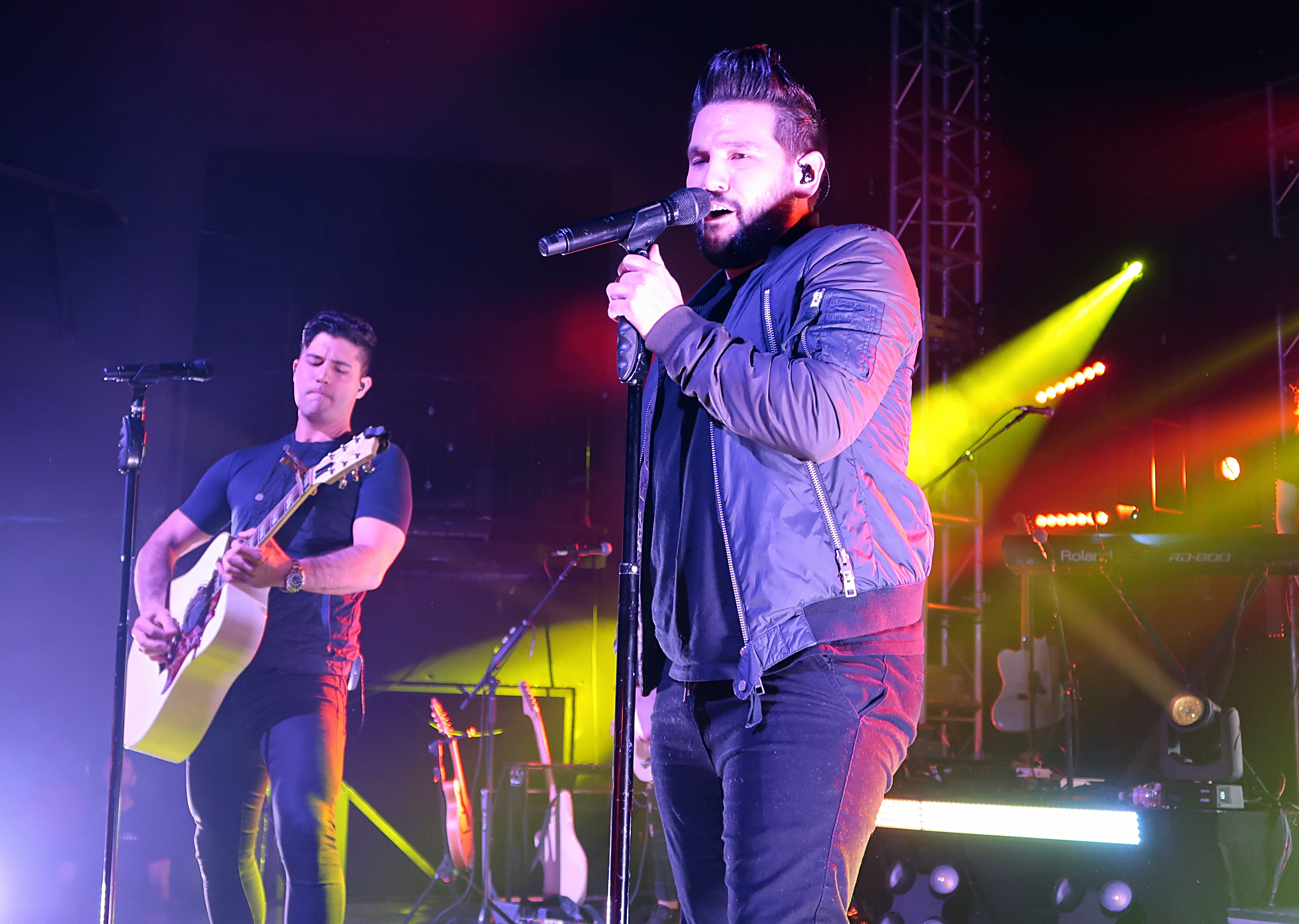
- Dan + Shay performing in 2017

Background information
- Origin: Nashville, Tennessee, U.S.
- Genres: Country; country pop
- Works: Dan + Shay discography
- Years active: 2013–present
- Label: Warner Nashville
- Members: Dan Smyers; Shay Mooney

Dan + Shay is an American country music duo composed of vocalists and songwriters Dan Smyers and Shay Mooney. They are signed to Warner Records Nashville and have released six albums, Where It All Began, Obsessed, Dan + Shay, Good Things, Bigger Houses and It's Officially Christmas: The Double Album. Of their nine singles, five have topped the Country Airplay chart and three have topped the Hot Country Songs chart. The duo have collaborated with Justin Bieber, Charlie Puth, Rascal Flatts, Lindsey Stirling, RaeLynn, and Kelly Clarkson. From 2019 to 2021, the duo won three consecutive Grammy Awards for Best Country Duo/Group Performance for the songs "Tequila", "Speechless", and "10,000 Hours" (with Justin Bieber).

== Career ==
=== 2013–2015: Where It All Began ===
Before the duo's foundation, Mooney was a solo artist on T-Pain's Nappy Boy Entertainment label and Smyers was a member of a group called Bonaventure as well as a previous member of the band Transition on Floodgate Records. The two met in Nashville, Tennessee, in December 2012 at Dan's house during a party. There they would perform together for the first time and started writing the day after they met. The first song they ever wrote together got put on hold for Rascal Flatts. Within two months, the duo had multiple publishing offers and signed with Warner/Chappell Music.

On October 14, 2013, the debut single, "19 You + Me", was released to country radio. Dan + Shay wrote the song with Danny Orton. The song received a positive review at Taste of Country which praised the "warm details" and "emotion". Their debut album, Where It All Began, was released on April 1, 2014, which Orton produced with Scott Hendricks. The album's second single, "Show You Off", was released to country radio on May 12, 2014. They performed on The Ellen DeGeneres Show, performing "19 You + Me" in 2014. They made their Grand Ole Opry debut on February 1, 2014. They also received a 2014 Academy of Country Music Awards Vocal Duo of the Year nomination. The album's third single, "Nothin' Like You", was released to country radio on February 23, 2015. It reached number one on the Country Airplay chart in December 2015.

Dan + Shay was the opening act for Hunter Hayes on his We're Not Invisible Tour, which began in March 2014. Dan + Shay opened for Blake Shelton on the 2014 leg of his Ten Times Crazier Tour. The tour began in June 2014 and ended in October 2014. Following the end of the Ten Times Crazier Tour, Dan + Shay embarked on their own 10-date headlining tour, the Where It All Began Tour. The tour began on October 9, 2014, in Minneapolis and concluded in Columbus, Ohio, on October 26, 2014. After the conclusion of the "Where It All Began Tour", Dan + Shay set out on the road once more with Hunter Hayes on his Tattoo (Your Name) Tour.

=== 2015–2017: Obsessed ===
In August 2015, the duo announced the Just the Right Kind of Crazy Tour across the Midwest and eastern United States. Their second album's first single, "From the Ground Up", was released to country radio in February 2016. On June 3, 2016, the duo released their second studio album, Obsessed. The album's second single, "How Not To", was released to country radio on September 26, 2016. The duo joined Darius Rucker on his Good for a Good Time Tour from June - September 2016. In November 2016, the duo started their The Obsessed Tour and continued to support it until April 2017. It reached number one on the Country Airplay chart in July 2017. The album's third single, "Road Trippin'", was released to country radio on July 17, 2017. In 2017, the duo supported Thomas Rhett on his Home Team Tour.

=== 2018: Dan + Shay ===
In January 2018, it was announced that the duo joined Rascal Flatts on the Back to Us Tour. In January 2018, the duo released "Tequila", the lead single from their self-titled third studio album, which was released on June 22, 2018. "Tequila" has since become their highest-charting song on the US Billboard Hot 100, with it reaching the top 40. On August 6, 2018, the duo released the second single from the album "Speechless". The album also features a collaboration with Kelly Clarkson on "Keeping Score". From October to December the duo supported Chris Young on his Losing Sleep World Tour. On February 11, 2019, the duo released the third single from the album "All to Myself". In August, they released Dan + Shay (The Vocals), which includes the vocal tracks of the two singles from the album.

=== 2019–2023: Good Things ===
From February to April, the duo went on their 2019 Dan + Shay Tour. On March 27, 2019, it was announced that the duo would join Shawn Mendes in Australia and New Zealand on his 2019 tour. On October 4, 2019, they released "10,000 Hours", a collaboration with Canadian singer Justin Bieber, after his and Hailey Bieber's wedding in South Carolina four days before. The song debuted at number 4 on the Billboard Hot 100 and also won the Grammy Award for Best Country Duo/Group Performance. The duo co-wrote Eric Ethridge's 2020 single "Dream Girl". From June to September 2019, the duo supported Florida Georgia Line on their Can't Say I Ain't Country Tour. In October 2019, the duo announced their Dan + Shay The (Arena) Tour originally set to start in March 2020. The Band Camino and Ingrid Andress were announced as opening acts. On March 12, 2020, after performing in Columbus, the duo announced the tour would be postponed to summer and fall 2020. Dates were postponed again to 2021, which also led to some cancellations after they were unable to reschedule from 2020 postponements. On July 31, 2020, the duo released the second single from the album, "I Should Probably Go to Bed". On February 5, 2021, they released the third single from the album, "Glad You Exist". On July 16, 2021, the duo announced their fourth album Good Things while releasing the album's title track "Good Things" as a single and revealing the album's release date of August 13, 2021. On August 16, 2021, "Steal My Love" was released as the album's fourth single. In August 2021, the duo collaborated with Carrie Underwood on a cover of "Only Us" from Dear Evan Hansen, which they recorded for the soundtrack album of the musical's 2021 film adaptation. It was released as a single on September 3, 2021. On November 2, 2021, the duo revealed they had to cancel two shows, in Orlando and Atlanta, on their Dan + Shay The (Arena) Tour due to a positive COVID-19 test within their touring camp. On July 18, 2022, "You" was released as the album's fifth single. On March 31, 2023, Dan + Shay were featured on the single "That's Not How This Works" by American singer-songwriter Charlie Puth, which was their first song to be featured on.

=== 2023–present: Bigger Houses and It’s Officially Christmas: The Double Album ===
In July 2023, Dan + Shay revealed that they almost broke up after their 2021 tour. Dan Smyers stated, "I was in, like, the lowest low of my entire life. Came off the road, and I was like, 'Man, I f---ing hate music. I'm ready to quit". They also confirmed their fifth studio album, Bigger Houses and released three singles, "Save Me the Trouble", "Bigger Houses", and "Heartbreak on the Map" on July 14, 2023. The album was released on September 15, 2023. On October 17, 2024, Dan + Shay released their first Christmas album, It's Officially Christmas: The Double Album.

The announced their sixth studio album, Young, would be released on August 21, 2026.

On June 11, 2026, the band performed the Star Spangled Banner before the USA-Paraguay game at Sofi Stadium in Los Angeles, CA for the 2026 FIFA World Cup. In the fall of 2026, Dan + Shay embarked on their headlining "The Young Tour", with Tyler Hubbard and Josh Ross as opening acts.

== In popular culture ==
The Dan + Shay song "Stop Drop + Roll" was featured on the Nashville season two episode "Your Good Girl's Gonna Go Bad". They were also featured on The Bachelorette in an episode that aired on June 7, 2016.

The duo also collaborated with violinist, dancer, and YouTuber Lindsey Stirling on a song from her third album Brave Enough. The song was entitled "Those Days", and the album was released on August 19, 2016. In 2017, the duo were featured on CMT Crossroads, along with Earth, Wind & Fire.

In 2018, the duo was featured on The Voice with Chevel Shepherd. On May 19, 2019, the duo performed their song "Speechless" with American Idol Top 3 contestant Madison VanDenburg. In 2020, the duo was featured on The Not-Too-Late Show with Elmo!. In 2021, the duo was featured on The Voice for a second time as Blake Shelton's Battle advisors. In June 2023, it was announced that the duo would become coaches on the 25th season of The Voice as the first ever duo coach on the American version on the show.

== Musical style and influences ==
Dan + Shay's musical style has been described as country, country pop, and pop. They also utilize elements of country rock, soft rock, and R&B. In describing their sound, Stephen Thomas Erlewine of AllMusic stated, "specializing in country-pop so smooth it would also sound at home on adult contemporary radio" and "their inherent sweetness served as a counterpoint to the swaggering bro-country that dominated mainstream country during the mid-2010s." Taste of Country compared them to Rascal Flatts and Love and Theft.

The duo has cited many musical influences. Dan Smyers cited artists such as Ryan Adams, Tom Petty, Kenny Chesney and Alison Krauss as musical influences. Shay Mooney cited artists such as Rascal Flatts, Dave Matthews Band, Usher and Kenny Chesney as musical influences. Billboard noted musical influences from The Beach Boys, Electric Light Orchestra, Alan Jackson and Brooks & Dunn on the duo's fourth album, Good Things. According to Dan Smyers in an interview:

"We write country songs — the topline, the lyrics of these songs...We grew up listening to all kinds of music, not just country but pop, rock, R&B, hip-hop, everything… and you hear that in the music."

== Members ==
=== Dan Smyers ===
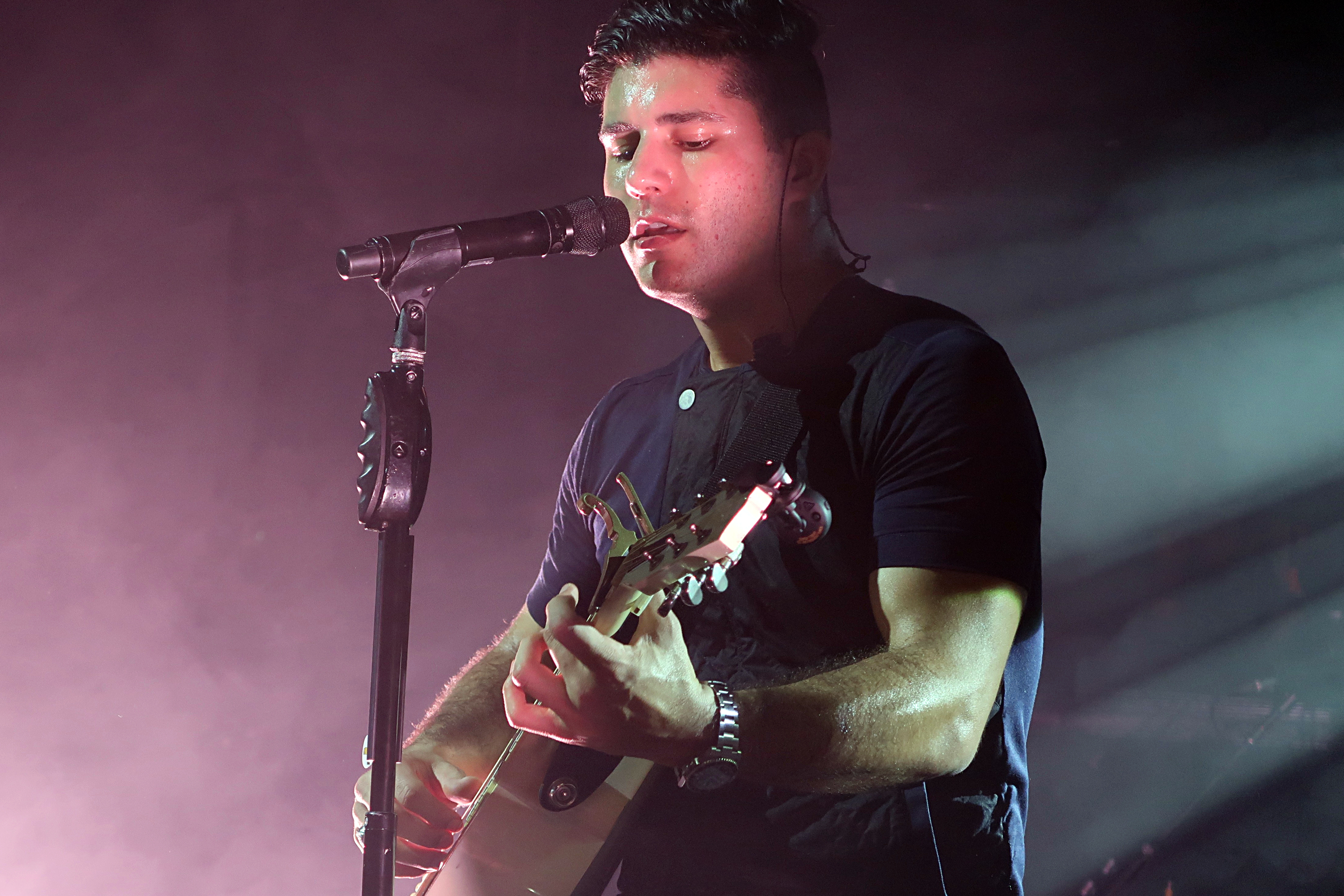
Dan Smyers

Daniel "Dan" Smyers, born August 16, 1987 (age 39) was raised in Wexford, Pennsylvania, where he attended North Allegheny Senior High School. He started playing music at the age of 12. Smyers attended Carnegie Mellon University with plans to study finance and play football. He moved to Nashville in 2010, after graduating from college the same year. Two years later he would meet Shay.

Prior to joining Dan + Shay, Smyers fronted an emo band called Transition, which also includes members like Harrison Wargo (who later formed The Morning Light) and Dustin Hook (who left to join My American Heart and is now the full-time touring bassist for Dan + Shay ), the band released one full-length record in 2006 on Floodgate Records produced by Mike Herrera, who is best known for his work with MxPx. Transition appeared on the Vans Warped Tour in both 2004 and 2006, and had opened for bands including All Time Low, MxPx, Streetlight Manifesto & Reel Big Fish He was also in a rock band called Bonaventure.

Instruments: Vocals, guitar, bass, piano

Smyers and Abby Law were in a relationship for many years before becoming engaged in 2016 and were married on May 13, 2017. Law made a cameo in a Dan + Shay videos for their songs "Nothin' Like You", "Speechless" and "10,000 Hours". Smyers and Abby work with Wags & Walks Rescue Nashville to save dogs and place them in their forever homes. They have five dogs together as of March 2021.

=== Shay Mooney ===
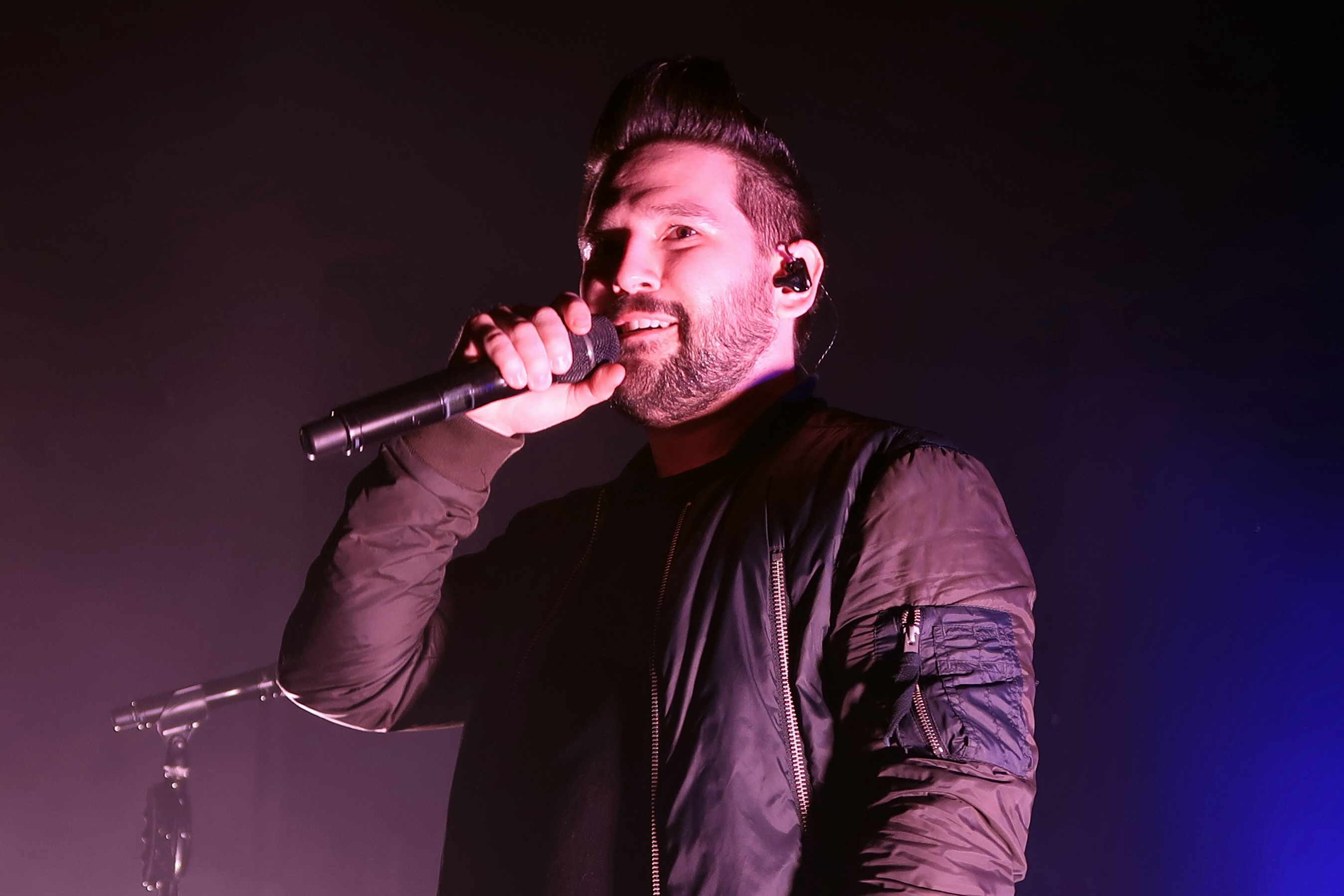
Shay Mooney

James Shay Mooney, born December 27, 1991 (age 34) was raised in Natural Dam, Arkansas, and was home-schooled until the fifth-grade, but later attended Union Christian Academy and Van Buren High School. At the age of 14, he started writing songs, and at 16, he started learning how to play guitar. Following high school, he attended Valley Forge Christian College for one year before completely pursuing his music career. Mooney had a record deal with rapper T-Pain on Pain's Nappy Boy Entertainment label. However, the deal ended once he formed Dan + Shay.

Instruments: Vocals, piano, guitar

On January 24, 2017, his fiancée Hannah Billingsley gave birth to their first child, a son. Mooney and Billingsley were married on October 20, 2017, in Arkansas. On February 21, 2020, the couple welcomed their second son. On January 17, 2023, Billingsley gave birth to the couple's third son. On January 20, 2025, Billingsley gave birth to the couple's fourth son.

== Discography ==
- Where It All Began (2014)
- Obsessed (2016)
- Dan + Shay (2018)
- Good Things (2021)
- Bigger Houses (2023)
- It's Officially Christmas: The Double Album (2024)
- Young (2026)

== Tours ==
Headlining

- Where It All Began Tour (2014–2015)
- Just the Right Kind of Crazy Tour (2015)
- The Obsessed Tour (2016–2017)
- Dan + Shay Tour (2019)
- The (Arena) Tour (2020–2021)
- The Heartbreak on the Map Tour (2024)
- The Young Tour (2026)

Supporting

- We're Not Invisible Tour (2014) (with Hunter Hayes)
- Ten Times Crazier Tour (2014) (with Blake Shelton)
- Tattoo (Your Name) Tour (2014) (with Hunter Hayes)
- Good for a Good Time Tour (2016) (with Darius Rucker)
- Home Team Tour (2017) (with Thomas Rhett, select dates)
- Back to Us Tour (2018) (with Rascal Flatts)
- Losing Sleep World Tour (2018) (with Chris Young)
- Can't Say I Ain't Country Tour (2019) (with Florida Georgia Line)
- Shawn Mendes: The Tour (2019) (with Shawn Mendes)

=== Touring band ===
- Justin Richards – guitar
- Dustin Hook – bass
- Andrew Cook – drums
- Izaac Burkhart – guitar, keys, backing vocals

== Filmography ==
Television Appearances
Year	Title	Role	Notes	Ref.
2017	CMT Crossroads	Themselves	with Earth, Wind & Fire	
2018	The Voice	Themselves	15th season with Chevel Shepherd	
2019	American Idol	Themselves	seventeenth season with Madison Vandenburg	
2020	The Not-Too-Late Show with Elmo!	Themselves	N/A	
2021	The Voice	Themselves/Mentor	20th season with Blake Shelton's team	
2023–24	The Voice	Coach	Filling in for Niall Horan during the Knockouts rehearsal in season 24 season 25	

== Awards and nominations ==
Year	Ceremony	Category	Result	Ref.
2014	Academy of Country Music Awards	Vocal Duo of the Year	Nominated	
2014	CMT Music Awards	Duo Video of the Year – "19 You + Me"	Nominated	
2014	Country Music Association Awards	Vocal Duo of the Year	Nominated	
2015	Academy of Country Music Awards	Vocal Duo of the Year	Nominated	
2015	ASCAP Country Music Awards	Most Performed Songs – "19 You + Me"	Won	
2015	Country Music Association Awards	Vocal Duo of the Year	Nominated	
2016	Academy of Country Music Awards	Vocal Duo of the Year	Nominated	
2016	Country Music Association Awards	Vocal Duo of the Year	Nominated	
2017	Academy of Country Music Awards	Vocal Duo of the Year	Nominated	
2017	Academy of Country Music Awards	New Vocal Duo or Group of the Year	Nominated	
2017	CMT Music Awards	Duo Video of the Year – "How Not To"	Nominated	
2017	Country Music Association Awards	Vocal Duo of the Year	Nominated	
2018	Academy of Country Music Awards	Vocal Duo of the Year	Nominated	
2018	CMT Music Awards	Duo Video of the Year – "Tequila"	Won	
2018	Country Music Association Awards	Vocal Duo of the Year	Nominated	
2018	Country Music Association Awards	Single of the Year – "Tequila"	Nominated	
2018	Country Music Association Awards	Music Video of the Year – "Tequila"	Nominated	
2018	American Music Awards	Favorite Duo or Group: Country	Nominated	
2018	American Music Awards	Favorite Song: Country – "Tequila"	Nominated	
2019	Grammy Awards	Best Country Duo Group Performance – "Tequila"	Won	
2019	Grammy Awards	Best Country Song	Nominated	
2019	iHeartRadio Music Awards	Song of the Year - "Tequila"	Nominated	
2019	iHeartRadio Music Awards	Song of the Year - "Speechless"	Nominated	
2019	iHeartRadio Music Awards	Country Song of the Year – "Tequila"	Nominated	
2019	Billboard Music Awards	Billboard Chart Achievement Award	Nominated	
2019	Billboard Music Awards	Top Duo/Group	Nominated	
2019	Billboard Music Awards	Top Country Artist	Nominated	
2019	Billboard Music Awards	Top Country Duo/Group	Won	
2019	Billboard Music Awards	Top Country Song – "Speechless"	Nominated	
2019	Billboard Music Awards	Top Country Song – "Tequila"	Nominated	
2019	Billboard Music Awards	Top Country Album – Dan + Shay	Nominated	
2019	Academy of Country Music Awards	Duo of the Year	Won	
2019	Academy of Country Music Awards	Album of the Year – "Dan + Shay"	Nominated	
2019	Academy of Country Music Awards	Single of the Year – "Tequila"	Won	
2019	Academy of Country Music Awards	Song of the Year – "Tequila"	Won	
2019	Academy of Country Music Awards	Musical Event of the Year – "Keeping Score" (ft. Kelly Clarkson)	Nominated	
2019	Academy of Country Music Awards	Video of the Year – "Tequila"	Nominated	
2019	CMT Music Awards	Duo Video of the Year - "Speechless"	Won	
2019	Country Music Association Awards	Vocal Duo of the Year	Won	
2019	Country Music Association Awards	Album of the Year – "Dan + Shay"	Nominated	
2019	Country Music Association Awards	Single of the Year – "Speechless"	Nominated	
2019	Teen Choice Awards	Choice Country Artist	Won	
2019	Teen Choice Awards	Choice Country Song – "Speechless"	Won	
2020	Grammy Awards	Best Country Duo Group Performance – "Speechless"	Won	
2020	Grammy Awards	Best Country Song – "Speechless"	Nominated	
2020	iHeartRadio Music Awards	Best Lyrics – "10,000 Hours" (with Justin Bieber)	Won	
2020	iHeartRadio Music Awards	Best Duo/Group of the Year	Nominated	
2020	iHeartRadio Music Awards	Country Artist of the Year	Nominated	
2020	Academy of Country Music Awards	Duo of the Year	Won	
2020	Academy of Country Music Awards	Song of the Year – "10,000 Hours" (with Justin Bieber)	Nominated	
2020	Academy of Country Music Awards	Music Event of the Year – "10,000 Hours" (with Justin Bieber)	Nominated	
2020	Academy of Country Music Awards	Video of the Year – "10,000 Hours" (with Justin Bieber)	Nominated	
2020	Country Music Association Awards	Vocal Duo of the Year	Won	
2020	Country Music Association Awards	Single of the Year – "10,000 Hours" (with Justin Bieber)	Nominated	
2020	Country Music Association Awards	Musical Event of the Year – "10,000 Hours" (with Justin Bieber)	Nominated	
2020	Country Music Association Awards	Music Video of the Year – "10,000 Hours" (with Justin Bieber)	Nominated	
2021	Grammy Awards	Best Country Duo/Group Performance – "10,000 Hours" (with Justin Bieber)	Won	
2021	Academy of Country Music	Duo of the Year	Won	
2021	iHeartRadio Music Awards	Best Duo/Group of the Year	Won	
2021	Berlin Music Video Awards	Best Cinematography - I Should Probably Go To Bed	Nominated	
2022	iHeartRadio Music Awards	Best Duo/Group of the Year	Nominated	
