= Brothers Osborne discography =

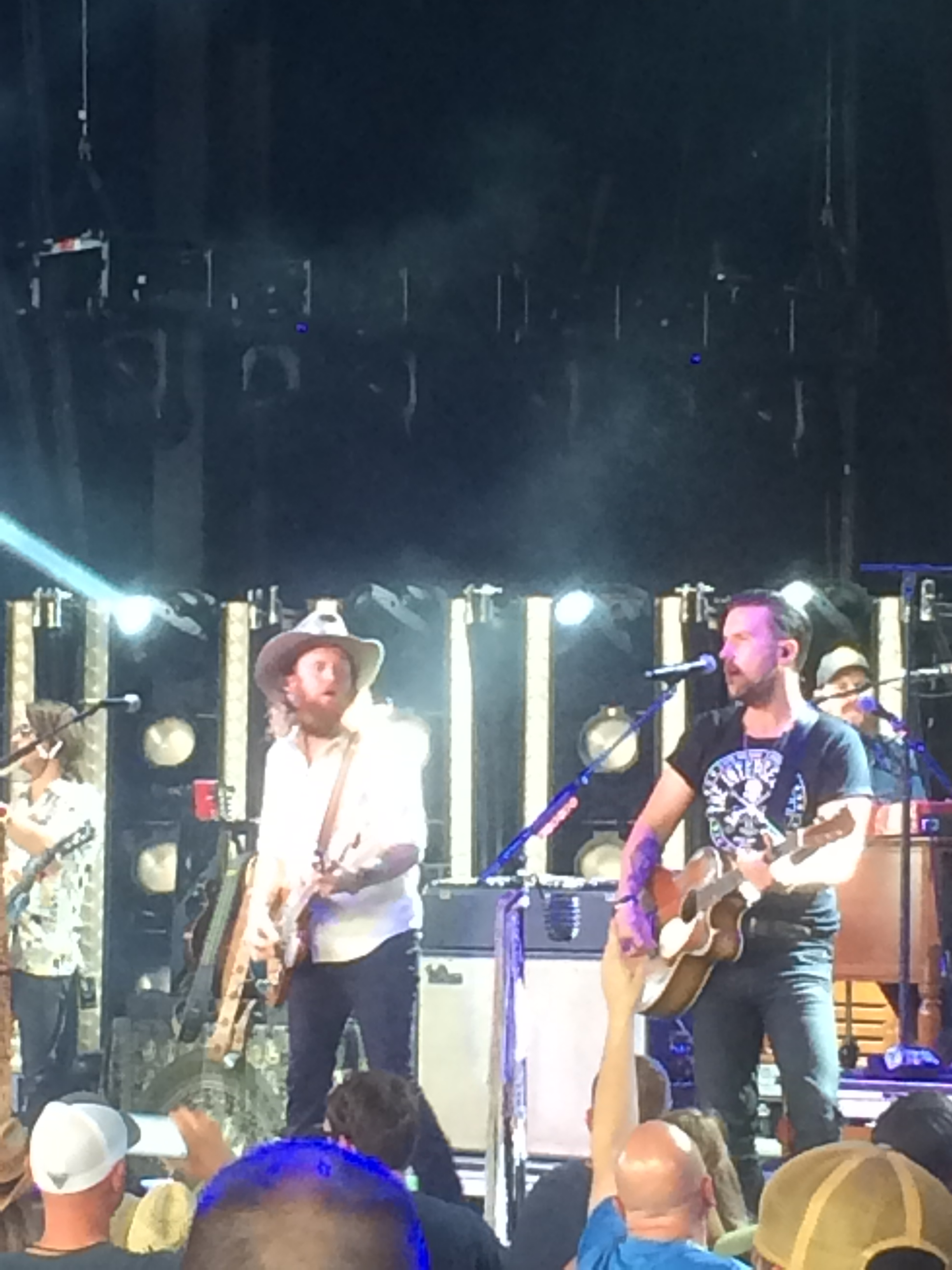
- Brothers Osborne performing in 2018
- Studio albums: 5
- EPs: 2
- Live albums: 1
- Singles: 14
- Music videos: 11
- Promotional singles: 10
- Other appearances: 8

American country music duo Brothers Osborne have released five studio albums, one live album, two extended plays, 14 singles, ten promotional singles, 11 music videos and appeared on eight albums.

The sibling duo signed with Capitol Records Nashville in 2012 and issued their debut single the following year titled "Let's Go There". Their label followed it with "Rum", which was a top 40 American country single. "Rum" appeared on their 2014 extended play. The extended play reached the top 25 of the Billboard Top Country Albums chart. In 2015, the duo released their third single titled "Stay a Little Longer". It became their first commercial success, reaching the top five of Billboard Hot Country Songs chart and certified platinum in sales. This was followed by their studio album in 2015 titled Pawn Shop, which debuted at number three on the Billboard Top Country Albums chart. The album also spawned the top 20 single "It Ain't My Fault".

In 2018, the duo released their second album titled Port Saint Joe. It became their highest-charting album to date, reaching number two on the Billboard country albums list. It spawned two top 40 singles: "Shoot Me Straight" and "I Don't Remember Me (Before You)". In 2019, they released their first live concert album titled Live at the Ryman. In October 2020, their third studio album was released called Skeletons. It debuted in the top five of the country albums chart and the top 15 of the Billboard 200 albums chart. It included two singles that reached top 40 positions on the American country charts: "Shoot Me Straight" and "I Don't Remember Me (Before You)".

Their third studio album Skeletons was released in October 2020. It made the top five of the Top Country Albums chart and the top 50 of the Billboard 200. Its lead single "All Night" reached the top 25 of the American country chart while becoming a top five single on Canada's Country Songs chart. It was followed by "I'm Not for Everyone" which reached the top 40 on the country charts. The duo's next single was released in 2023 called "Nobody's Nobody", which has since made the American and Canadian country charts.

== Albums ==
=== Studio albums ===
List of studio albums, with selected chart positions, sales and certifications, showing other details
Title	Album details	Peak chart positions				Sales	Certifications
Title	Album details	US	US Coun.	CAN	UK	Sales	Certifications
Pawn Shop	Release date: January 15, 2016; Label: EMI Nashville; Formats: CD, LP, music download	17	3	32	—	US: 237,100	RIAA: Platinum
Port Saint Joe	Release date: April 20, 2018; Label: EMI Nashville; Formats: CD, LP, music download	15	2	30	47	US: 90,600	
Skeletons	Release date: October 9, 2020; Label: EMI Nashville; Formats: CD, LP, music download	43	4	48	—		
Brothers Osborne	Release date: September 15, 2023; Label: EMI Nashville; Formats: CD, LP, music download	192	28	—	—		
Watertown	Release date: October 23, 2026; Label: Mercury Nashville; Formats: CD, LP, music download	—	—	—	—		
"—" denotes a recording that did not chart.

=== Live albums ===
List of live albums, showing all relevant details
Title	Album details	Sales
Live at the Ryman	Release date: October 25, 2019; Label: EMI Nashville; Formats: CD, LP, music download	US: 2,400

== Extended plays ==
List of extended plays, with selected chart positions and sales, showing other details
Title	EP details	Peak chart positions		Sales
Title	EP details	US Coun.	US Heat.	Sales
Brothers Osborne	Release date: September 9, 2014; Label: EMI Nashville; Format: Music download	23	4	US: 13,300
Break Mine	Release date: March 22, 2024; Label: EMI Nashville; Format: Music download	—	—	
"—" denotes a recording that did not chart.

== Singles ==
=== As lead artist ===
List of singles, with selected chart positions and certifications, showing other relevant details
Title	Year	Peak chart positions					Sales	Certifications	Album
Title	Year	US	US Coun.	US Coun. Air.	CAN	CAN Coun.	Sales	Certifications	Album
"Let's Go There"	2013	—	—	36	—	—			Non-album single
"Rum"	2014	—	34	27	—	—	US: 146,000	RIAA: Gold	Brothers Osborne (EP)
"Stay a Little Longer"	2015	46	4	2	68	26	US: 607,000	RIAA: 3× Platinum; MC: Gold	Pawn Shop
"21 Summer"	2016	— (Note: "21 Summer" did not enter the Billboard Hot 100, but peaked at number 23 on the Bubbling Under Hot 100 Singles chart, which serves as an extension to the Hot 100.)	25	24	—	35	US: 138,000	RIAA: Platinum	Pawn Shop
"It Ain't My Fault"	2017	79	14	12	—	10	US: 356,000	RIAA: 2× Platinum	Pawn Shop
"Shoot Me Straight"	2018	—	29	28	—	31	US: 67,000	RIAA: Platinum	Port Saint Joe
"I Don't Remember Me (Before You)"	2018	—	40	31	—	—	US: 38,000	RIAA: Gold	Port Saint Joe
"All Night"	2020	— (Note: "All Night" did not enter the Billboard Hot 100, but peaked at number 9 on the Bubbling Under Hot 100 Singles chart, which serves as an extension to the Hot 100.)	25	25	68	4		RIAA: Gold; MC: Platinum	Skeletons
"I'm Not for Everyone"	2021	—	37	33	—	29		RIAA: Platinum; MC: Gold	Skeletons
"Nobody's Nobody"	2023	—	49	22	—	30			Brothers Osborne
"Break Mine"	2024	—	—	59	—	—			Break Mine
"Born and Raised Hell" (featuring Cody Johnson)	2026	—	—	40	—	—			Watertown
"—" denotes a recording that did not chart.

=== As a featured artist ===
List of featured singles, with selected chart positions, showing other relevant details
Title	Year	Peak chart positions					Certifications	Album
Title	Year	US	US Coun.	US Coun. Air.	CAN	CAN Coun.	Certifications	Album
"Good at Tonight" (David Nail featuring Brothers Osborne)	2016	—	—	52	—	—		Fighter
"Burning Man" (Dierks Bentley with Brothers Osborne)	2018	45	5	2	72	1	RIAA: 2× Platinum	The Mountain
"—" denotes a recording that did not chart.

=== Promotional singles ===
List of promotional singles, with selected chart positions, showing all relevant details
Title	Year	Peak chart positions	Album	Ref.
Title	Year	US Cou. Digi.	Album	Ref.
"Skeletons"	2020	16	Skeletons	
"Make It a Good One"	2020	23	Skeletons	
"Younger Me"	2021	—	Skeletons	
"Might as Well Be Me"	2023	25	Brothers Osborne	
"Rollercoaster (Forever and a Day)"	2023	—	Brothers Osborne	
"Goodbye's Kickin' In"	2023	—	Brothers Osborne	
"Finish This Drink"	2025	—	Non-album single	
"R.I.P. (Sellout Edit)"	2026	—	Watertown	
"Bottle It Up (Sellout Edit)"	2026	—	Watertown	
"Doors (Sellout Edit)"	2026	—	Watertown	
"—" denotes a recording that did not chart.

== Music videos ==
List of music videos, showing year released and director
Title	Year	Director(s)	Ref.
"Let's Go There"	2013	Reid Long	
"Rum"	2014	Peter Zavadil	
"Stay a Little Longer"	2015	Peter Zavadil	
"21 Summer"	2016	Justin Clough	
"It Ain't My Fault"	2017	Wes Edwards; Ryan Silver	
"Shoot Me Straight"	2018	Wes Edwards; Ryan Silver	
"Burning Man" (with Dierks Bentley)	2018	Wes Edwards	
"I Don't Remember Me (Before You)"	2019	Wes Edwards; Ryan Silver	
"All Night"	2020	Wes Edwards; Ryan Silver	
"Skeletons"	2020	—N/a	
"Younger Me"	2021	—N/a	

== Other album appearances ==
List of non-single guest appearances, with other performing artists, showing year released and album name
Title	Year	Other artist(s)	Album	Ref.
"Take Me to the Pilot"	2018	—N/a	Restoration: Reimagining the Songs of Elton John and Bernie Taupin	
"All My Favorite People"	2019	Maren Morris	Girl	
"Hard Workin' Man"	2019	Brooks & Dunn	Reboot	
"In the Sweet By and By"	2021	Leslie Jordan	Company's Comin'	
"I Smoke Weed"	2021	Hardy	Hixtape, Vol. 2	
"It's Only Rock 'n Roll (But I Like It)"	2023	The War and Treaty	Stoned Cold Country	
"Play Ball"	2022	Ashley McBryde	Lindeville	
"I Won't Back Down"	2024	—N/a	Petty Country	
