= List of awards and nominations received by Brothers Osborne =

Brothers Osborne awards and nominations
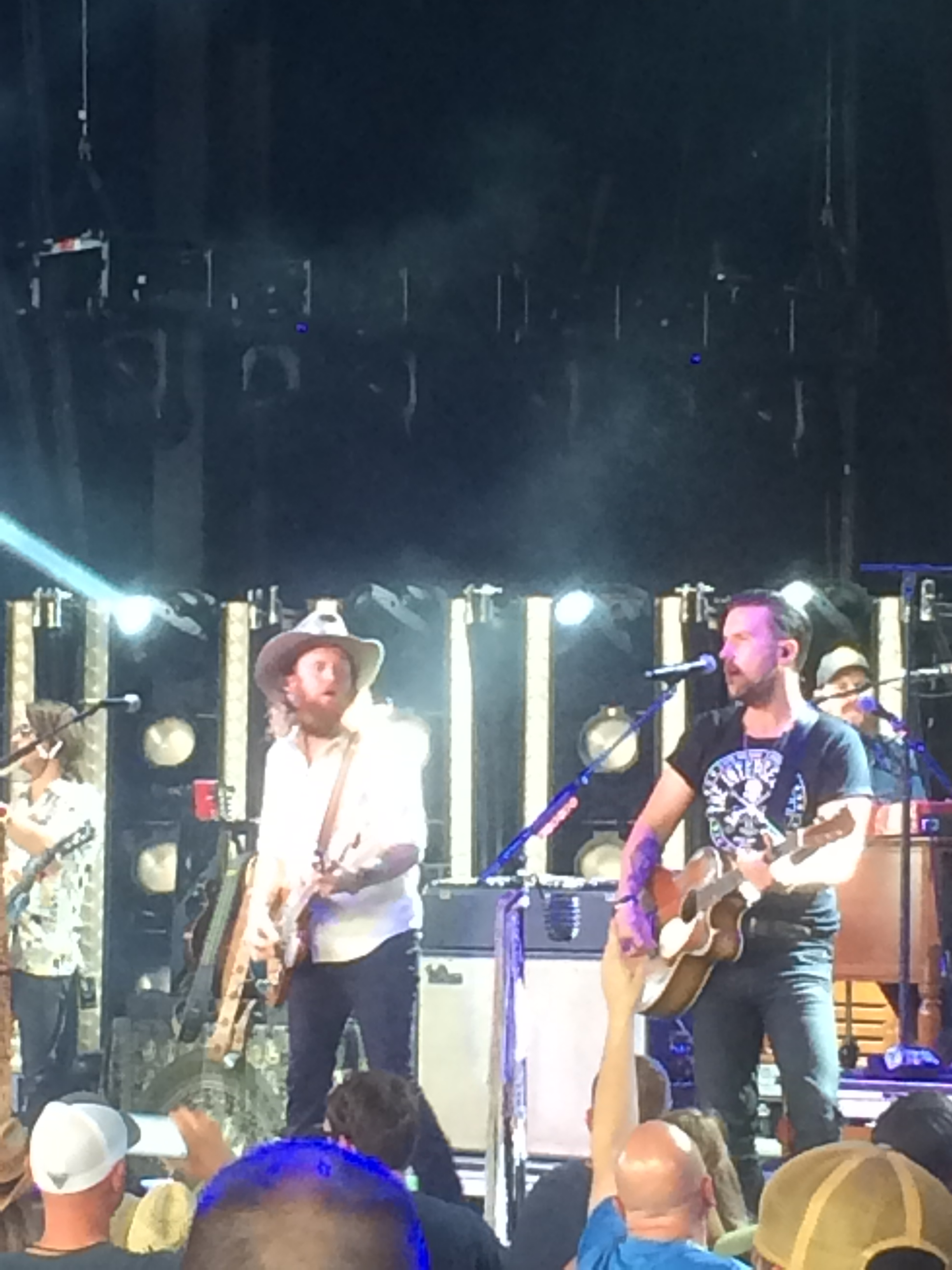
- Brothers Osborne in 2018
Awards and nominations
Award	Wins	Nominations
Academy of Country Music Awards	6	7
Country Music Association Awards	5	15
CMT Awards	0	3
Grammy Awards	1	13

Totals (Note: Certain award groups do not simply award one winner. They acknowledge several different recipients, have runners-up, and have third place. Since this is a specific recognition and is different from losing an award, runner-up mentions are considered wins in this award tally. For simplification and to avoid errors, each award in this list has been presumed to have had a prior nomination.)
- Wins: 12
- Nominations: 38

American country music duo Brothers Osborne has received nine awards and 23 award nominations in their career. Their first accolade was given from the Academy of Country Music in 2016 for New Artist of the Year. In similar vein, the Country Music Association awarded the duo for a similar trophy later that year. Both associations have also awarded Brothers Osborne their Vocal Duo of the Year accolades. They have also received nominations for their 2018 collaboration with Dierks Bentley. They have received twelve nominations from the Grammy Awards, including one win for Best Country Duo/Group Performance at the 2022 Grammy Awards.

== Academy of Country Music ==
Year	Nominee / work	Award	Result	Ref.
2014	Vocal Duo of the Year	Brothers Osborne	Nominated	
2015	Vocal Duo of the Year	Brothers Osborne	Nominated	
2015	New Vocal Duo of the Year	Brothers Osborne	Nominated	
2016	New Vocal Duo of the Year	Brothers Osborne	Won	
2016	Vocal Duo of the Year	Brothers Osborne	Won	
2017	Vocal Duo of the Year	Brothers Osborne	Won	
2017	Video of the Year	"It Ain't My Fault"	Won	
2018	Video of the Year	"Shoot Me Straight"	Nominated	
2018	Video of the Year	"Burning Man" (with Dierks Bentley)	Nominated	
2018	Musical Event of the Year	"Burning Man" (with Dierks Bentley)	Won	
2018	Vocal Duo of the Year	Brothers Osborne	Nominated	
2019	Vocal Duo of the Year	Brothers Osborne	Nominated	
2020	Vocal Duo of the Year	Brothers Osborne	Nominated	
2021	Vocal Duo of the Year	Brothers Osborne	Nominated	
2021	Album of the Year	Skeletons	Nominated	
2022	Vocal Duo of the Year	Brothers Osborne	Won	

== Country Music Association ==
Year	Nominee / work	Award	Result	Ref.
2015	Vocal Duo of the Year	Brothers Osborne	Nominated	
2016	New Artist of the Year	Brothers Osborne	Nominated	
2016	Vocal Duo of the Year	Brothers Osborne	Won	
2017	Vocal Duo of the Year	Brothers Osborne	Won	
2017	Video of the Year	"It Ain't My Fault"	Won	
2018	Vocal Duo of the Year	Brothers Osborne	Won	
2018	Musical Event of the Year	"Burning Man" (with Dierks Bentley)	Nominated	
2019	Video of the Year	"Burning Man" (with Dierks Bentley)	Nominated	
2019	Single of the Year	"Burning Man" (with Dierks Bentley)	Nominated	
2019	Musical Event of the Year	"All My Favorite People" (with Maren Morris)	Nominated	
2019	Vocal Duo of the Year	Brothers Osborne	Nominated	
2020	Vocal Duo of the Year	Brothers Osborne	Nominated	
2021	Vocal Duo of the Year	Brothers Osborne	Won	
2021	Album of the Year	Skeletons	Nominated	
2021	Video of the Year	"Younger Me"	Nominated	
2022	International Artist Achievement Award	Brothers Osborne	Nominated	

== Grammy Awards ==
Year	Nominee / work	Award	Result	Ref.
2016	Best Country Duo/Group Performance	"Stay a Little Longer"	Nominated	
2017	Best Country Duo/Group Performance	"21 Summer"	Nominated	
2018	Best Country Duo/Group Performance	"It Ain't My Fault"	Nominated	
2019	Best Country Duo/Group Performance	"Shoot Me Straight"	Nominated	
2019	Best Country Album	Port Saint Joe	Nominated	
2020	Best Country Duo/Group Performance	"I Don't Remember Me (Before You)"	Nominated	
2021	Best Country Duo/Group Performance	"All Night"	Nominated	
2022	Best Country Duo/Group Performance	"Younger Me"	Won	
2022	Best Country Album	Skeletons	Nominated	
2023	Best Country Duo/Group Performance	"Midnight Rider's Prayer"	Nominated	
2024	Best Country Duo/Group Performance	"Nobody's Nobody"	Nominated	
2024	Best Country Album	Brothers Osborne	Nominated	
2025	Best Country Duo/Group Performance	"Break Mine"	Nominated	

== CMT Music Awards ==
Year	Nominee / work	Award	Result	Ref.
2017	Duo Video of the Year	"21 Summer"	Nominated	
2019	Duo Video of the Year	"I Don't Remember Me (Before You)"	Nominated	
2019	Collaborative Video of the Year	"Burning Man" (with Dierks Bentley)	Nominated	
