= Live at the Ryman (Brothers Osborne album) =

Live album by Brothers Osborne
- Released: October 25, 2019
- Venue: Ryman Auditorium
- Genre: Country
- Length: 1:14:28
- Label: EMI Nashville

Brothers Osborne chronology
| Port Saint Joe (2018) | Live at the Ryman (2019) | Skeletons (2020) |

Live at the Ryman is a live album by American country music duo Brothers Osborne. It was released on October 25, 2019, via EMI Records Nashville and contained 12 tracks. The project was the duo's third album release and first live effort. Live at the Ryman was compiled from a series of concerts held in Nashville, Tennessee.

== Background and content ==
Brothers Osborne performed three concerts in 2019 at the Ryman Auditorium in Nashville, Tennessee. From these shows, a handful of their performances were included to compile Live at the Ryman. The album contained a total of 12 tracks. These tracks included live versions of their country hits, such as "Stay a Little Longer" and "It Ain't My Fault." The album also includes a handful of live cuts originally found on their 2018 album, Port Saint Joe. It was the duo's first live album in their career and one of several albums recorded at the Ryman Auditorium. Other artists to have recorded there include Emmylou Harris, Jason Isbell and Ringo Starr. In a 2019 interview John Osborne of the duo spoke about his feelings recording the live project: "To play this place one night is a gift and an accomplishment that everyone should remember but the fact that we did it three, I can’t even wrap my mind around it."

== Release and reception ==
Live at the Ryman was released on October 25, 2019, via EMI Records Nashville. It was the pair's third album release in their career. The album was distributed as a compact disc, music download and LP. Live at the Ryman has since sold 2,400 copies in the United States as of December 2019. Jon Freeman of Rolling Stone reviewed the live performances that would make up the album. He described the duo's sound on the record to evoke "progressive country" styles. Freeman praised how the duo were able to "reshape" several of their former recordings to sound different from the originals. "It’s hard to imagine another country group in the present with daring or skill enough to pull it off so successfully," he commented.

== Track listing ==
=== Compact disc and digital versions ===
Live at the Ryman
| No. | Title | Writer(s) | Length |
|---|---|---|---|
| 1. | "Drank Like Hank" | Kendell Marvel; John Osborne; T.J. Osborne | 3:49 |
| 2. | "Shoot Me Straight" | Lee Thomas Miller; J. Osborne; T.J. Osborne | 6:20 |
| 3. | "I Don't Remember Me (Before You)" | Matt Dragstrem; Shane McAnally; J. Osborne; T.J. Osborne | 3:14 |
| 4. | "Weed, Whiskey and Willie" | J. Osborne; T.J. Osborne; Laura Veltz | 7:12 |
| 5. | "Down Home" | Jessi Alexander; J. Osborne; T.J. Osborne | 4:46 |
| 6. | "Rum" | Barry Dean; J. Osborne; T.J. Osborne | 5:41 |
| 7. | "Pushing Up Daisies (Love Alive)" | Marvel; J. Osborne; T.J. Osborne | 4:46 |
| 8. | "Tequila Again" | Marvel; J. Osborne; T.J. Osborne | 4:24 |
| 9. | "21 Summer" | J. Osborne; T.J. Osborne; Craig Wiseman | 3:39 |
| 10. | "Love the Lonely Out of You" | Connie Harrington; J. Osborne; T.J. Osborne | 8:17 |
| 11. | "Stay a Little Longer" | McAnally; J. Osborne; T.J. Osborne | 6:14 |
| 12. | "It Ain't My Fault" | Miller; J. Osborne; T.J. Osborne | 16:16 |
| Total length: | | | 1:14:28 |

=== Vinyl version ===
LP 1: Side one
| No. | Title | Writer(s) | Length |
|---|---|---|---|
| 1. | "Drank Like Hank" | Marvel; John Osborne; T.J. Osborne | 3:49 |
| 2. | "Shoot Me Straight" | Miller; J. Osborne; T.J. Osborne | 6:20 |
| 3. | "I Don't Remember Me (Before You)" | Matt Dragstrem; McAnally; J. Osborne; T.J. Osborne | 3:14 |
| 4. | "Weed, Whiskey and Willie" | J. Osborne; T.J. Osborne; Veltz | 7:12 |

LP 1: Side two
| No. | Title | Writer(s) | Length |
|---|---|---|---|
| 1. | "Down Home" | Alexander; J. Osborne; T.J. Osborne | 4:46 |
| 2. | "Rum" | Dean; J. Osborne; T.J. Osborne | 5:41 |
| 3. | "Pushing Up Daisies (Love Alive)" | Marvel; J. Osborne; T.J. Osborne | 4:46 |
| 4. | "Tequila Again" | Marvel; J. Osborne; T.J. Osborne | 4:24 |

LP 2: Side one
| No. | Title | Writer(s) | Length |
|---|---|---|---|
| 1. | "21 Summer" | J. Osborne; T.J. Osborne; Wiseman | 3:39 |
| 2. | "Love the Lonely Out of You" | Harrington; J. Osborne; T.J. Osborne | 8:17 |
| 3. | "Stay a Little Longer" | McAnally; J. Osborne; T.J. Osborne | 6:14 |

LP 2: Side two
| No. | Title | Writer(s) | Length |
|---|---|---|---|
| 1. | "It Ain't My Fault" | Miller; J. Osborne; T.J. Osborne | 16:16 |

== Release history ==
| Region | Date | Format | Label | Ref. |
|---|---|---|---|---|
| United States | October 25, 2019 | Digital download; streaming; compact disc; vinyl | EMI Records Nashville | |
