= Grammy Award for Best Country Duo/Group Performance =

Annual music award

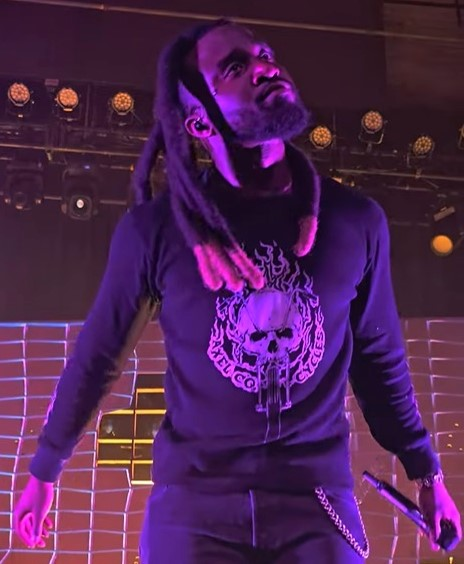
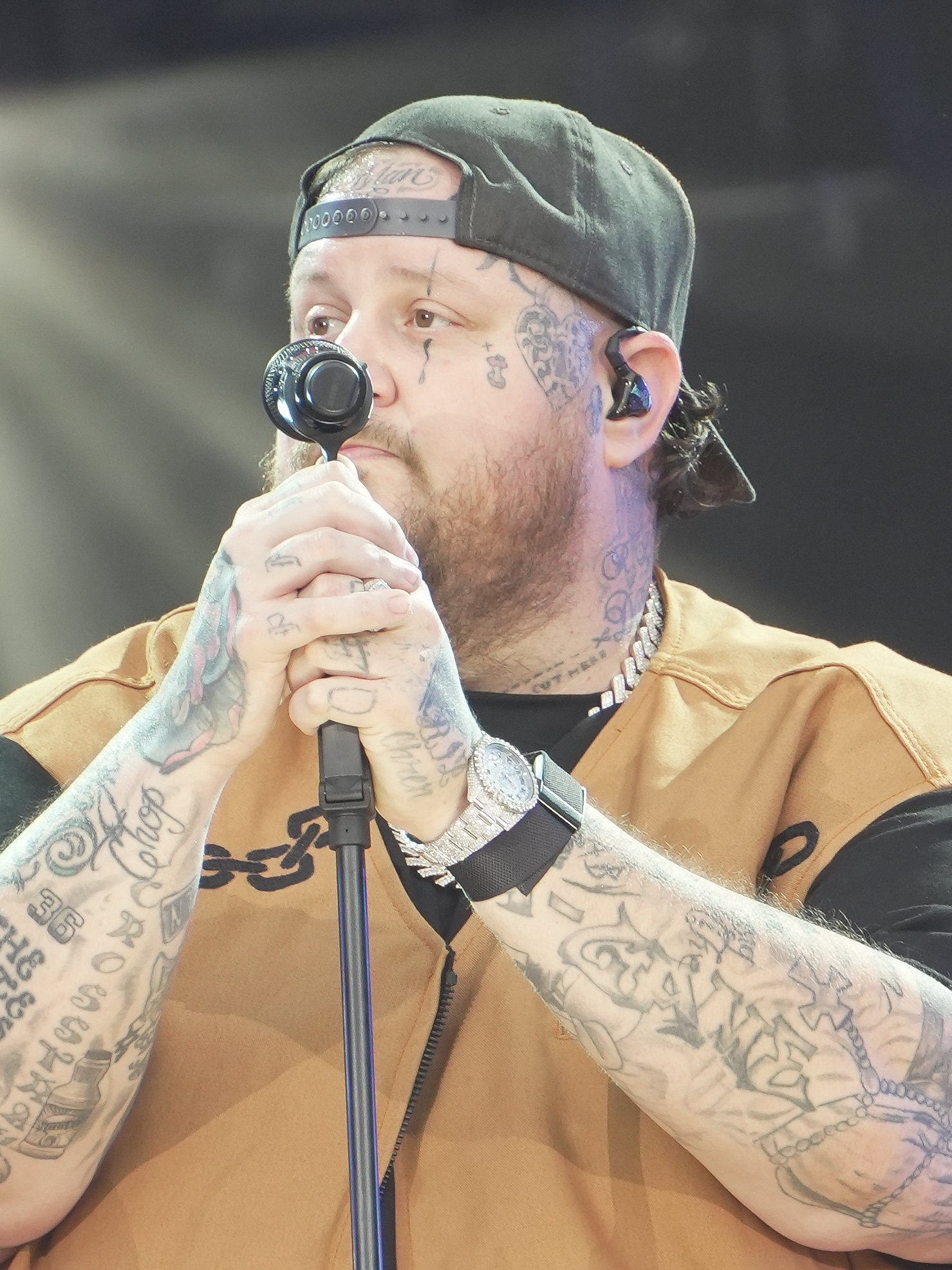
- "Amen" by Shaboozey and Jelly Roll is the most recent recipient
- Awarded for: Artistic excellence in a duo, group, or collaborative vocal or instrumental country performance
- Country: United States
- Presented by: National Academy of Recording Arts and Sciences
- First award: 2012
- Currently held by: Shaboozey and Jelly Roll – "Amen" (2026)
- Website: grammy.com

The Grammy Award for Best Country Duo/Group Performance is an award presented at the Grammy Awards, a ceremony that was established in 1958 and originally called the Gramophone Awards. It was first awarded in 2012, after a major overhaul of Grammy Award categories. The award combines the previous categories for Best Country Performance by a Duo or Group with Vocal, Best Country Collaboration with Vocals and Best Country Instrumental Performance (if the instrumental recording is performed by a duo or group). The restructuring of these categories was a result of the Recording Academy's wish to decrease the list of categories and awards.

According to the 54th Grammy Awards description guide it is designed for duo/group or collaborative (vocal or instrumental) country recordings and is limited to singles or tracks only.

== Recipients ==
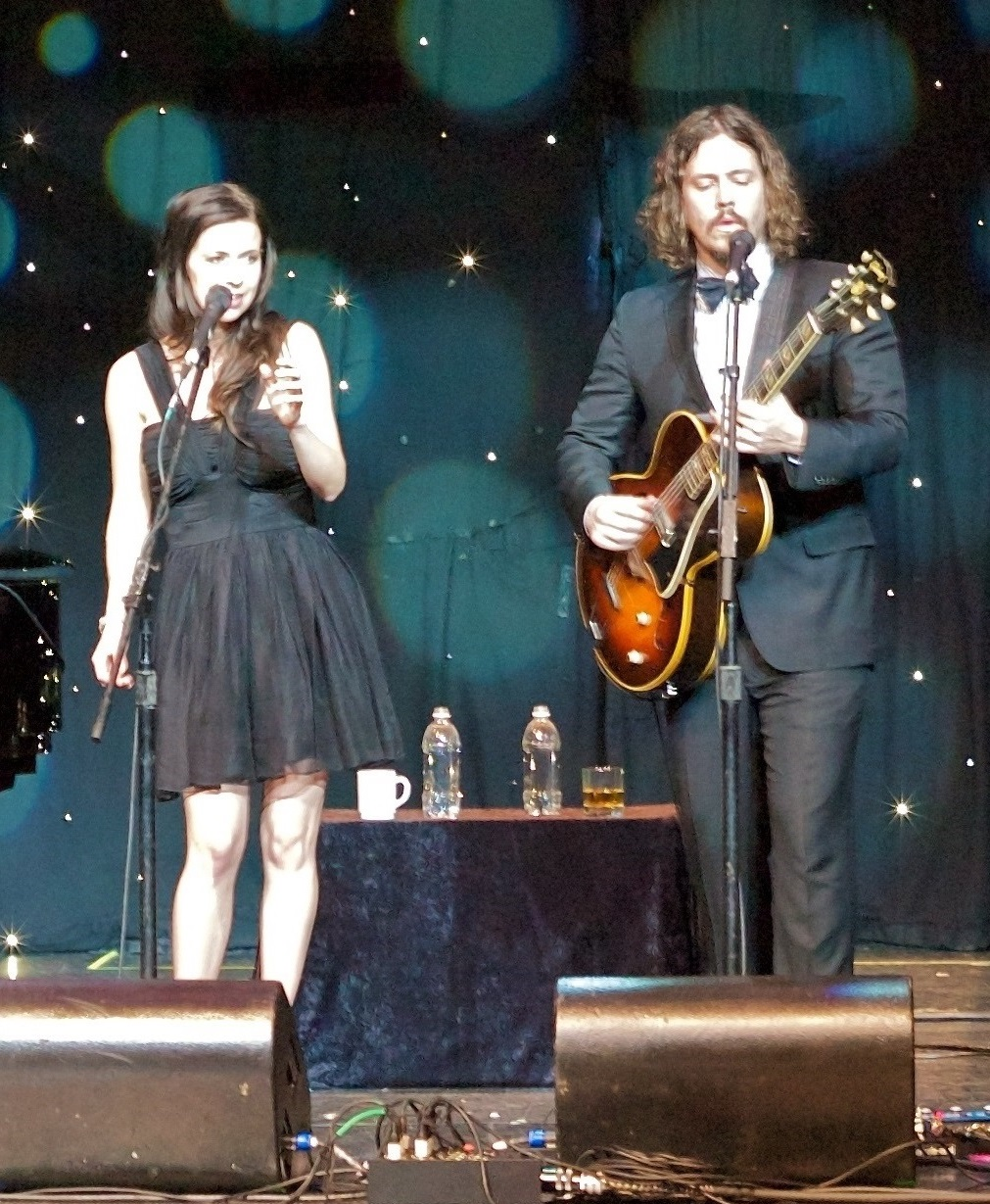
Inaugural recipients The Civil Wars also won in 2014.

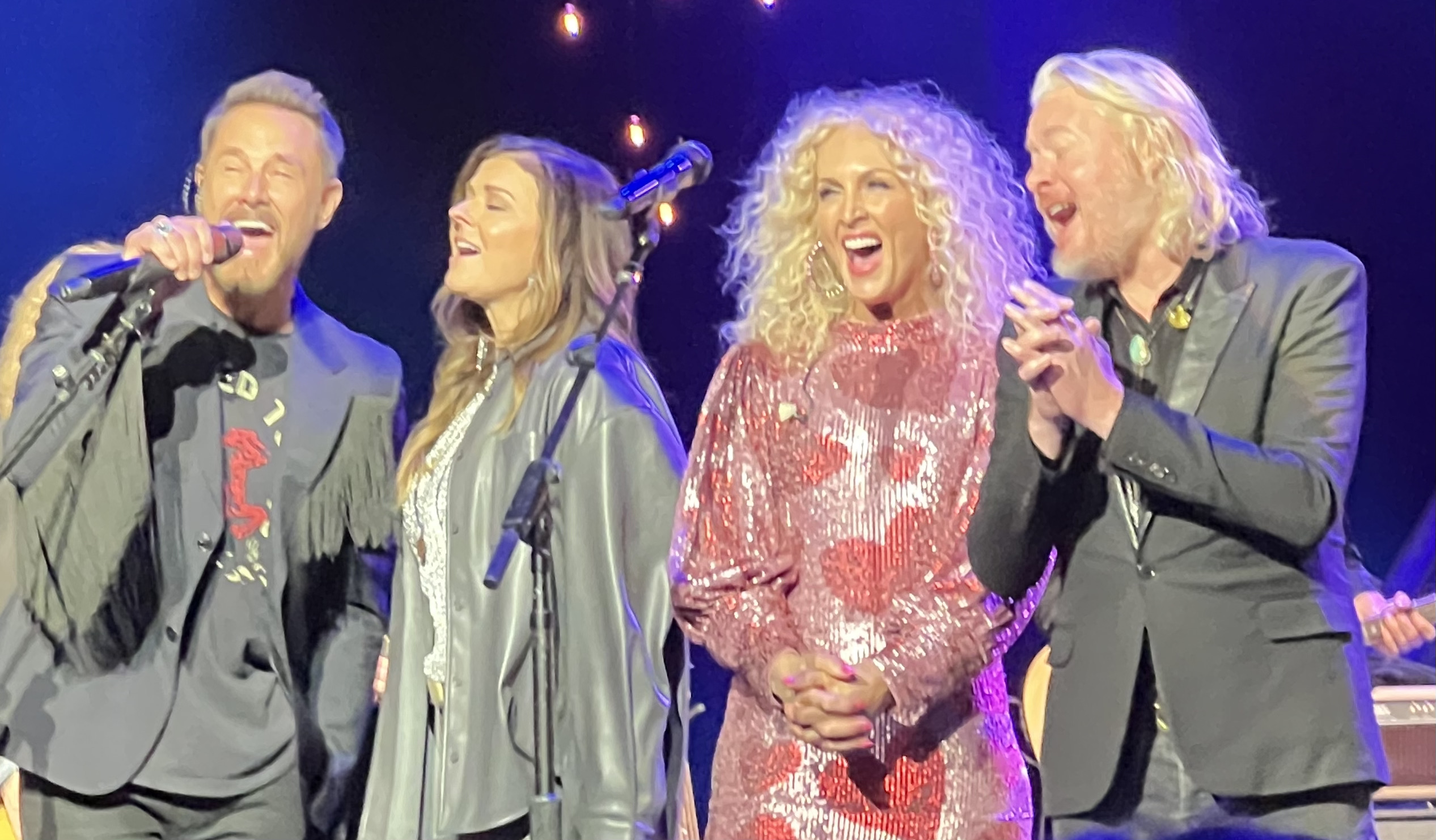
Three-time winners Little Big Town.

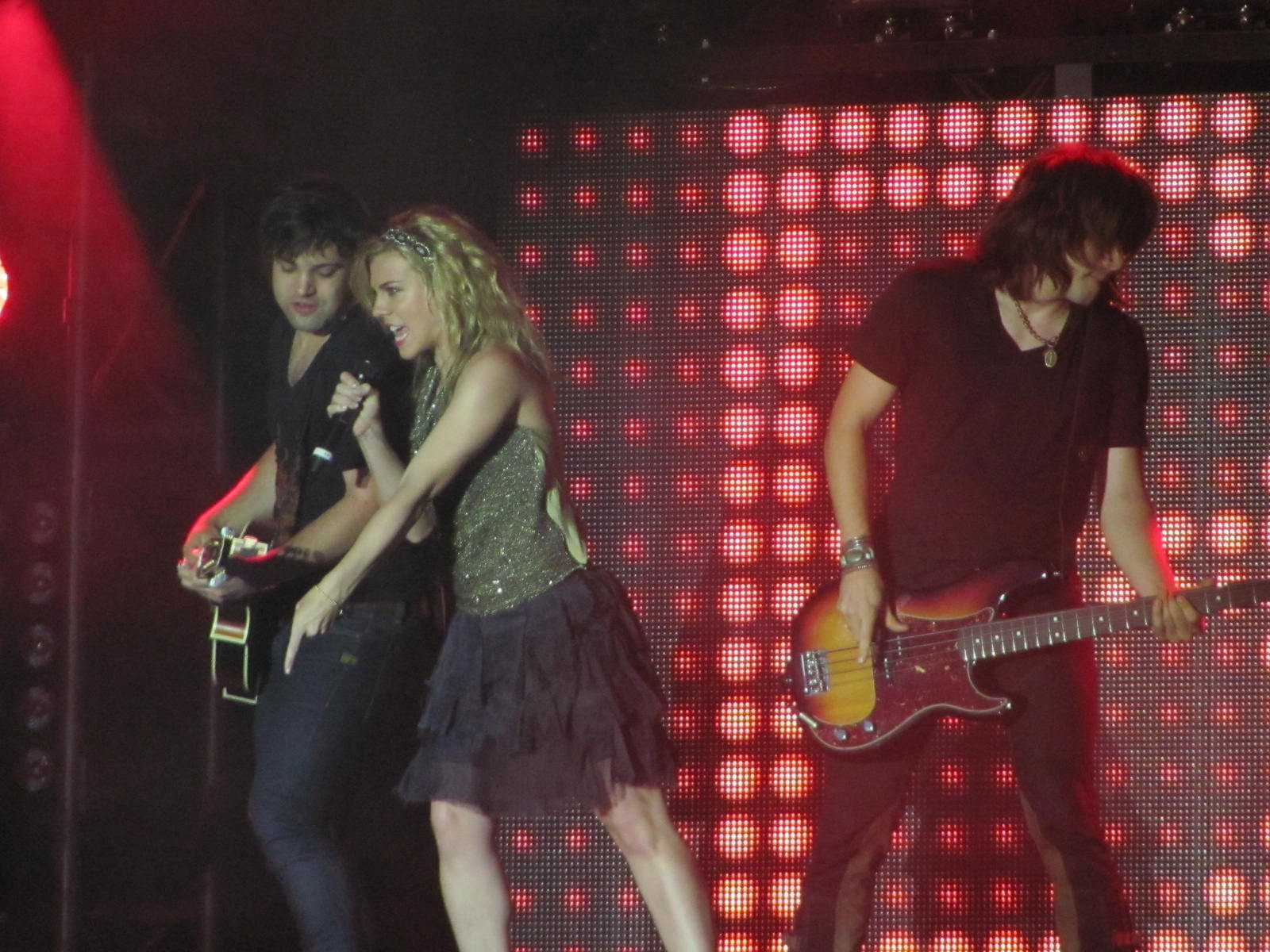
2015 winners The Band Perry.

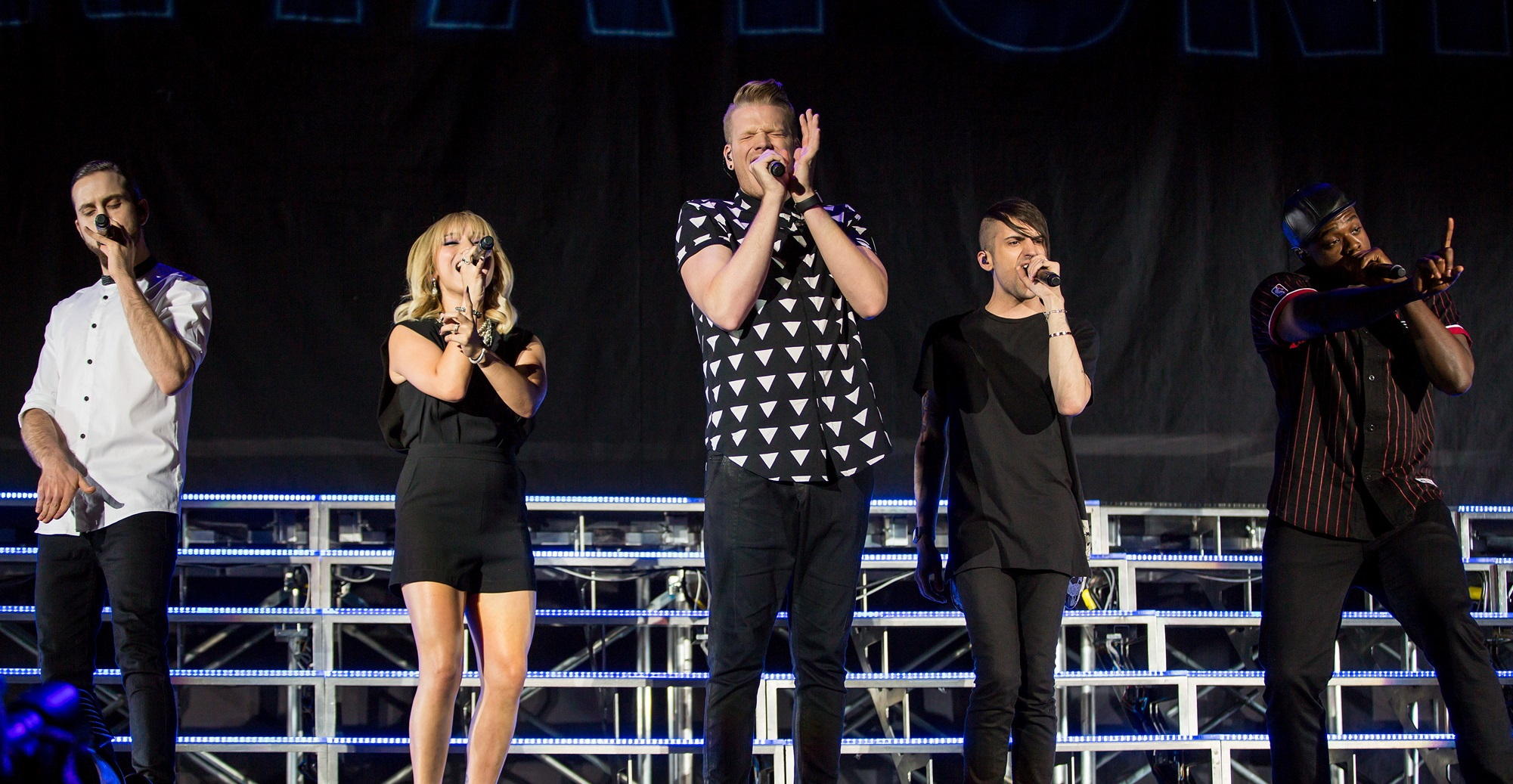
Pentatonix won in 2017 alongside Dolly Parton.

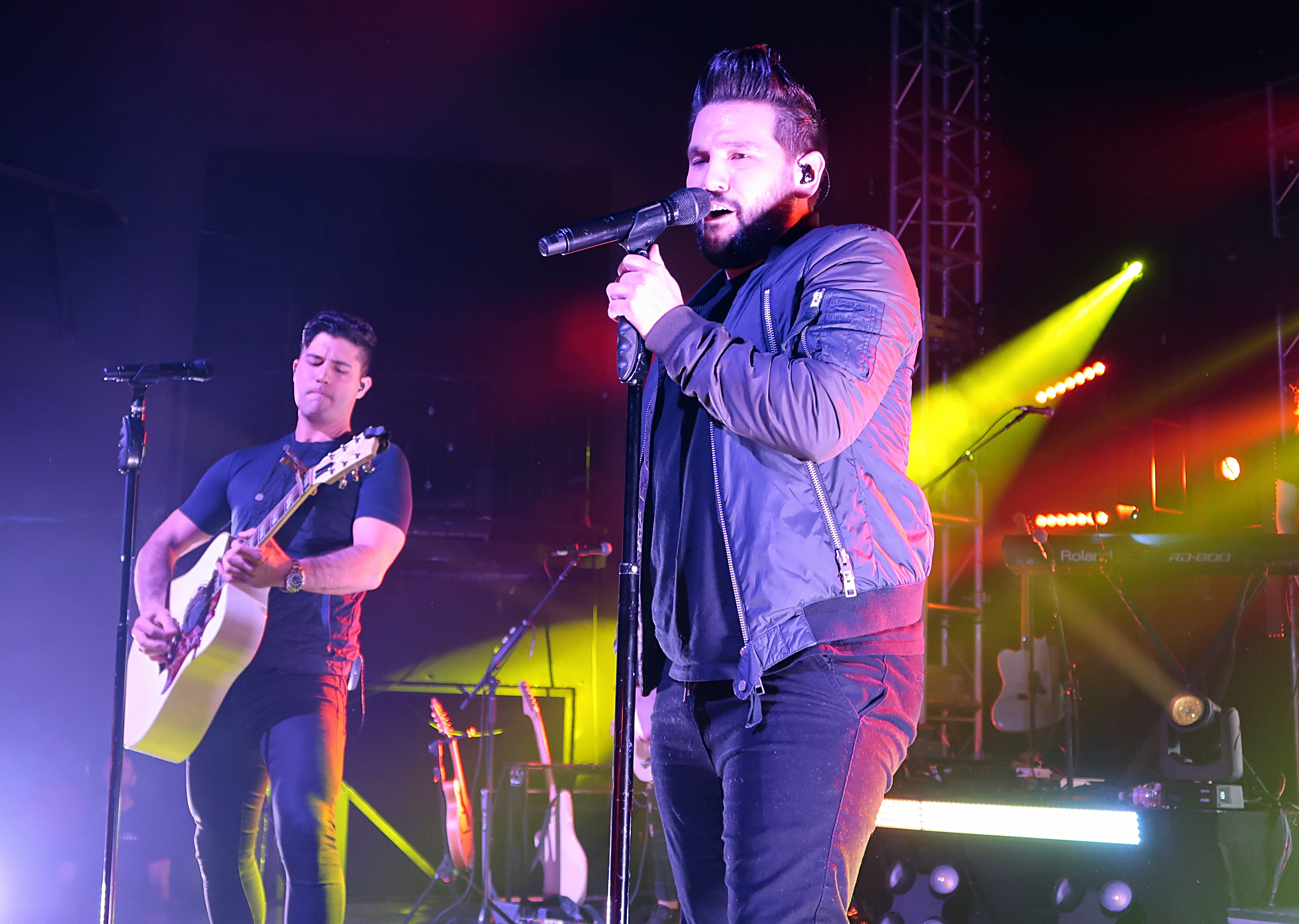
Dan + Shay won the award in three consecutive years from 2019 to 2021.

=== 2010s ===
Year	Artist	Work
2012
2012	The Civil Wars	"Barton Hollow"
2012	Jason Aldean with Kelly Clarkson	"Don't You Wanna Stay"
2012	Kenny Chesney with Grace Potter	"You and Tequila"
2012	Thompson Square	"Are You Gonna Kiss Me or Not"
2013
2013	Little Big Town	"Pontoon"
2013	Eli Young Band	"Even If It Breaks Your Heart"
2013	Taylor Swift with The Civil Wars	"Safe & Sound"
2013	The Time Jumpers	"On the Outskirts of Town"
2013	Don Williams with Alison Krauss	"I Just Come Here for the Music"
2014
2014	The Civil Wars	"From This Valley"
2014	Tim McGraw with Taylor Swift and Keith Urban	"Highway Don't Care"
2014	Kelly Clarkson featuring Vince Gill	"Don't Rush"
2014	Little Big Town	"Your Side of the Bed"
2014	Kenny Rogers with Dolly Parton	"You Can't Make Old Friends"
2015
2015	The Band Perry	"Gentle on My Mind"
2015	Miranda Lambert with Carrie Underwood	"Somethin' Bad"
2015	Little Big Town	"Day Drinking"
2015	Tim McGraw with Faith Hill	"Meanwhile Back at Mama's"
2015	Keith Urban with Eric Church	"Raise 'Em Up"
2016
2016	Little Big Town	"Girl Crush"
2016	Brothers Osborne	"Stay a Little Longer"
2016	Joey + Rory	"If I Needed You"
2016	Charles Kelley with Dierks Bentley and Eric Paslay	"The Driver"
2016	Blake Shelton with Ashley Monroe	"Lonely Tonight"
2017
2017	Pentatonix with Dolly Parton	"Jolene"
2017	Dierks Bentley with Elle King	"Different for Girls"
2017	Brothers Osborne	"21 Summer"
2017	Kenny Chesney with P!nk	"Setting the World on Fire"
2017	Chris Young with Cassadee Pope	"Think of You"
2018
2018	Little Big Town	"Better Man"
2018	Brothers Osborne	"It Ain't My Fault"
2018	Zac Brown Band	"My Old Man"
2018	Lady Antebellum	"You Look Good"
2018	Midland	"Drinkin' Problem"
2019
2019	Dan + Shay	"Tequila"
2019	Brothers Osborne	"Shoot Me Straight"
2019	Little Big Town	"When Someone Stops Loving You"
2019	Maren Morris with Vince Gill	"Dear Hate"
2019	Bebe Rexha with Florida Georgia Line	"Meant to Be"

=== 2020s ===
Year	Artist	Work
2020
2020	Dan + Shay	"Speechless"
2020	Brooks & Dunn with Luke Combs	"Brand New Man"
2020	Brothers Osborne	"I Don't Remember Me (Before You)"
2020	Little Big Town	"The Daughters"
2020	Maren Morris featuring Brandi Carlile	"Common"
2021
2021	Dan + Shay and Justin Bieber	"10,000 Hours"
2021	Brothers Osborne	"All Night"
2021	Lady A	"Ocean"
2021	Little Big Town	"Sugar Coat"
2021	Old Dominion	"Some People Do"
2022
2022	Brothers Osborne	"Younger Me"
2022	Jason Aldean and Carrie Underwood	"If I Didn't Love You"
2022	Dan + Shay	"Glad You Exist"
2022	Ryan Hurd and Maren Morris	"Chasing After You"
2022	Elle King and Miranda Lambert	"Drunk (And I Don't Wanna Go Home)"
2023
2023	Carly Pearce and Ashley McBryde	"Never Wanted to Be That Girl"
2023	Ingrid Andress and Sam Hunt	"Wishful Drinking"
2023	Brothers Osborne	"Midnight Rider's Prayer"
2023	Luke Combs and Miranda Lambert	"Outrunnin' Your Memory"
2023	Reba McEntire and Dolly Parton	"Does He Love You (Revisited)"
2023	Robert Plant and Alison Krauss	"Going Where the Lonely Go"
2024
2024	Zach Bryan featuring Kacey Musgraves	"I Remember Everything"
2024	Dierks Bentley featuring Billy Strings	"High Note"
2024	Brothers Osborne	"Nobody's Nobody"
2024	Vince Gill and Paul Franklin	"Kissing Your Picture (Is So Cold)"
2024	Jelly Roll and Lainey Wilson	"Save Me"
2024	Carly Pearce featuring Chris Stapleton	"We Don't Fight Anymore"
2025
2025	Beyoncé and Miley Cyrus	"II Most Wanted"
2025	Kelsea Ballerini and Noah Kahan	"Cowboys Cry Too"
2025	Brothers Osborne	"Break Mine"
2025	Dan + Shay	"Bigger Houses"
2025	Post Malone featuring Morgan Wallen	"I Had Some Help"
2026
2026	Shaboozey and Jelly Roll	"Amen"
2026	Miranda Lambert and Chris Stapleton	"A Song to Sing"
2026	Reba McEntire, Miranda Lambert and Lainey Wilson	"Trailblazer"
2026	Margo Price and Tyler Childers	"Love Me Like You Used to Do"
2026	George Strait and Chris Stapleton	"Honky Tonk Hall of Fame"
2027	Zac Brown Band featuring Dolly Parton	"Butterfly"
2027	Mumford & Sons featuring Chris Stapleton	"Here"
2027	Kacey Musgraves featuring Miranda Lambert	"Horses and Divorces"
2027	Dolly Parton featuring Lainey Wilson, Miley Cyrus, Queen Latifah and Reba McEntire	"Light of a Clear Blue Morning"
2027	Lainey Wilson and John Mayer	"Phone, Keys, Wallet"

== Artists with multiple wins ==
3 wins

- Dan + Shay
- Little Big Town

2 wins

- The Civil Wars

== Artists with multiple nominations ==
10 nominations

- Brothers Osborne

8 nominations

- Little Big Town

6 nominations

- Miranda Lambert

5 nominations

- Dan + Shay
- Dolly Parton
- Chris Stapleton
- Lainey Wilson

3 nominations

- Dierks Bentley
- The Civil Wars
- Vince Gill
- Reba McEntire
- Maren Morris

2 nominations

- Jason Aldean
- Zac Brown Band
- Kenny Chesney
- Kelly Clarkson
- Luke Combs
- Miley Cyrus
- Jelly Roll
- Elle King
- Alison Krauss
- Tim McGraw
- Kacey Musgraves
- Carly Pearce
- Taylor Swift
- Carrie Underwood
- Keith Urban

== See also ==
- Grammy Award for Best Country Performance by a Duo or Group with Vocal
- Grammy Award for Best Country Solo Performance
- Grammy Award for Best Country Song
- Grammy Award for Best Country Album
