= Sugar Coat =

2019 promotional single by Little Big Town

- Promotional image for the music video featuring Kate Bosworth

Promotional single by Little Big Town

from the album Nightfall
- Released: November 22, 2019
- Genre: Country
- Length: 3:39
- Label: Capitol Nashville
- Songwriters: Josh Kerr; Lori McKenna; Jordyn Shellhart
- Producers: Ian Fitchuk; Little Big Town; Daniel Tashian

Little Big Town singles chronology
"The Daughters" (2019)	"Sugar Coat" (2019)	"Over Drinking" (2020)

"Sugar Coat" is a song recorded by American country music quartet Little Big Town from their ninth studio album, Nightfall (2020). It was released as a promotional single on November 22, 2019. Written by Josh Kerr, Lori McKenna and Jordyn Shellhart and with lead vocals by Little Big Town's Karen Fairchild, the song is known for its emotional lyrics, expressive vocal performance and cinematic music video.

"Sugar Coat" was nominated for the Grammy Award for Best Country Duo/Group Performance at the 63rd Annual Grammy Awards, the band's third consecutive nomination in the category and eighth overall, and Video of the Year at the 55th Academy of Country Music Awards.

== Content ==
Lyrically, the song focuses on the pressure to keep life picture perfect, even when the opposite is true. The Boot described the track as “sung from the point of view of someone who has that Instagram-worthy "home sweet home", but not the love that should come with it. The lyrics, which play on the verb "sugarcoat" and turn the word into a metaphorical object, express that her poised demeanor is learned from past generations, and that she desires to break free from it.” The narrator reflects upon how someone who is less inhibited by the pressures to keep up appearances would engage in destructive behaviors in order to cope but that she is unable to, with the chorus noting: “Sometimes I wish I liked drinkin' / Sometimes I wish I liked pills / Wish I could sleep with a stranger / But someone like me never will / Sometimes I hardly can stand it / I just smile with a lump in my throat / Sometimes I wish I could bear it / Didn't have to wear this sugar coat”.

== Live performances ==
Little Big Town performed the song on live TV for the first time on January 16, 2020, on The Tonight Show Starring Jimmy Fallon. They subsequently played the song on The TODAY Show on January 20, 2020. The song was included in the setlist for Little Big Town's Nightfall Tour.

== Music video ==
The video premiered on November 22, 2019. Directed by brother and sister duo Stephen and Alexa Kinigopoulos, who also directed the videos for the singles "Over Drinking" and "Wine, Beer, Whiskey", the video was shot just outside of Nashville and features American actress Kate Bosworth playing Joy, a 1960s-style housewife reminiscent of Mad Men's Betty Draper. Bosworth's character suspects her husband (played by Isaiah Stratton) of having an affair but is forced to maintain the image of a perfect life until she sees him with the other woman one night through the window. She subsequently breaks down, burning her wedding photos and destroying some of her husband's belongings before regaining her composure. In a cliffhanger ending, she joins her husband and their children for breakfast wearing a necklace he had intended to give to his mistress, revealing that she knows about his infidelity. Fans took to social media to praise the music video for its "powerful" message.

Discussing her character, Bosworth explained "She is often lonely and unfulfilled – realizing that she is not getting what she needs from a partner, devastated by the choices that her husband is making. As she slowly discovers what is happening, while it's a sad moment, it is ultimately a resilient one. She finds her strength, her fortitude, and ultimately herself. It was an honor to bring this song to life with a band that I love."

In a behind-the-scenes featurette on the making of the video posted to YouTube, Alexa Kinigopoulos explained that she and her brother had the idea for the video immediately after hearing the song for the first time, particularly the image of Joy running through the street in twilight, and then built the rest of the video around that. Scenes featuring the band singing were filmed but were not included in the final video. Karen Fairchild had the idea to hire Bosworth for the lead role after seeing her present at the CMT Music Awards.
