= Brothers Osborne (EP) =

EP by Brothers Osborne
- Released: September 9, 2014
- Recorded: 2014
- Genre: Country
- Length: 20:47
- Label: EMI Nashville
- Producer: Brad Hill, Brothers Osborne

Brothers Osborne chronology
Brothers Osborne (2014)	Pawn Shop (2016)

Singles from Brothers Osborne
- 1. "Rum" Released: March 31, 2014

Brothers Osborne is the first EP from American country music duo Brothers Osborne. As their first commercial release, the work was released on September 9, 2014, and published through EMI Records Nashville. The EP includes a demo of "Stay a Little Longer", co-written by Shane McAnally and first featured on this EP, but re-recorded with Jay Joyce for the single release.

== Touring ==
The duo toured with Eric Church on his Outsiders Tour.

== Critical reception ==
Steve Gazibara of Whiskey Riff states that the "sound, the vibe, and the lyrics are a breath of fresh air", going on to say that "'Love The Lonely Out of You' is a groovy and bluesy tune, the perfect compliment to the other four songs, especially the rocking and gritty 'Shoot from the Hip'".

== Track listing ==
No.	Title	Writer(s)	Length
1.	"Shoot from the Hip"	John Osborne, TJ Osborne, Will Anderson	3:34
2.	"Arms of Fire"	J. Osborne, TJ Osborne, Tim Nichols, Connie Harrington	3:59
3.	"Stay a Little Longer"	J. Osborne, TJ Osborne, Shane McAnally	4:16
4.	"Love the Lonely Out of You"	J. Osborne, TJ Osborne, C. Harrington	5:30
5.	"Rum"	J. Osborne, TJ Osborne, Barry Dean	3:28
Total length:			20:47

== Chart history ==
Chart (2014)	Peak position
US Top Country Albums	23
US Heatseekers Albums	4
