= Forever and a Night =

Forever and a Night may refer to:

- "Forever and a Night", a song by Girls Aloud from Sound of the Underground (album)
- "Forever and a Night", a song by Little Big Town from Nightfall (Little Big Town album)
- "Forever and a Night", a song by Viki Gabor
