= Woman, Amen =

Single by Dierks Bentley

from the album The Mountain
- Released: January 17, 2018
- Genre: Country
- Length: 3:00
- Label: Capitol Nashville
- Songwriters: Dierks Bentley; Josh Kear; Ross Copperman
- Producers: Ross Copperman; Jon Randall

Dierks Bentley singles chronology
"What the Hell Did I Say" (2017)	"Woman, Amen" (2018)	"Burning Man" (2018)

"Woman, Amen" is a song co-written and recorded by American country music singer Dierks Bentley. It was released in January 2018 as the lead single from his 2018 album The Mountain. Bentley wrote this song with Josh Kear and Ross Copperman, the latter of whom also co-produced it.

== Content ==
Dierks Bentley said that the song was inspired by his wife, Cassidy Black. He said that "I've come back from so many writing appointments over the past 12 years like 'I wrote this song about you' and she's like, 'Just because it's a love song doesn't mean it's about me.'"

The song is a "ringing, uptempo track" driven by a "propulsive groove" from drummer Matt Chamberlain. Rolling Stone described the song as having "bright, ringing guitars and vocals that as if shouted from a hilltop, while a rolling drumbeat embodies an avalanche of devotion for one's significant other." Bentley wrote with Josh Kear and Ross Copperman, the latter of whom also produced it. He said that the song was written after a series of songwriting sessions in Telluride, Colorado which produced most of the album's content, and that he was inspired after Kear provided the title line.

== Commercial performance ==
The song debuted on Country Airplay at No. 29 on its radio release, and entered the Hot Country Songs chart at No. 23 the following week. It peaked at No. 1 on Country Airplay in June 2018 in its 25th week on the chart. It is Bentley's 16th No. 1 on the chart. It has sold 141,000 copies in the United States as of July 2018.

== Personnel ==
Adapted from The Mountain liner notes.

- Dierks Bentley – lead vocals, background vocals
- Matt Chamberlain – drums
- Ross Copperman – background vocals, keyboards, programming
- Ian Fitchuk – bass guitar, keyboards
- Ben Helson – acoustic guitar, mandolin
- Jedd Hughes – acoustic guitar, electric guitar
- Josh Kear – background vocals
- Jon Randall – acoustic guitar, mandolin
- F. Reid Shippen – programming

== Charts ==
=== Weekly charts ===
Chart (2018)	Peak position
Canada Country (Billboard)	1
US Billboard Hot 100	53
US Country Airplay (Billboard)	1
US Hot Country Songs (Billboard)	7

=== Year-end charts ===
Chart (2018)	Position
US Country Airplay (Billboard)	23
US Hot Country Songs (Billboard)	28
US Radio Songs (Billboard)	75

== Certifications ==
Region	Certification	Certified units/sales
Canada (Music Canada)	Gold	40,000^{‡}
United States (RIAA)	Platinum	1,000,000^{‡}
^{‡} Sales+streaming figures based on certification alone.
