= Let's Go There =

Single by Brothers Osborne
- Released: September 2013
- Genre: Country
- Length: 2:55
- Label: EMI Nashville
- Songwriter(s): Jon Mabe; John Osborne; T.J. Osborne
- Producer(s): Brad Hill; John Osborne; T.J. Osborne

Brothers Osborne singles chronology
"Let's Go There" (2013)	"Rum" (2014)

"Let's Go There" is the debut single by American country music duo Brothers Osborne. The song was composed by John and T.J. Osborne, along with Jon Mabe. Released in 2013 on EMI Records Nashville, "Let's Go There" would reach the top 40 of the country charts in the United States. It received positive reviews from critics and journalists.

== Background and content ==
In 2012, the sibling duo Brothers Osborne (consisting of John and T.J. Osborne) signed their first recording contract with EMI Records Nashville. The song was composed by brothers, as well as Jon Mabe. In a 2013 interview, T.J. Osborne explained that "Let's Go There" was first composed in "the dead of winter." By being surrounded in a cold environment, the songwriting team were inspired to write a song about "getting away from the cold and going someplace, or just any place, to get out of a funk." The song was produced by the brothers, along with Brad Hill. T.J. Osborne is featured on the recording performing lead vocals.

== Release, reception and music video ==
"Let's Go There" received positive reviews from music critics and writers. Billy Dukes of Taste of Country praised the song's "musicianship" and characterized it as a "country love song." Dukes concluded saying, "Great songs will come, but without talent and professionalism, they fall through the cracks with many other new artists. Brothers Osborne prove that won't happen on this first look at the sibling duo. They're definitely one to keep an eye on in 2014."

The song was released as their debut single in September 2013 via EMI Nashville. It spent a total of 19 weeks on the Billboard Country Airplay chart, peaking at number 36 in December 2013. It was the duo's first charting single. Because of the song's limited commercial success, EMI failed to release it on an album. Instead, their next single was released in 2014. A music video was released soon after its release as a single. The video was directed by Reid Long.

== Track listing ==
Digital download/streaming

- "Let's Go There" – 2:55

== Charts ==
Chart performance for "Let's Go There"
Chart (2013)	Peak position
US Country Airplay (Billboard)	36
