= Living (song) =

Single by Dierks Bentley

from the album The Mountain
- Released: February 25, 2019
- Genre: Country
- Length: 3:42
- Label: Capitol Nashville
- Songwriters: Dierks Bentley; Ross Copperman; Ashley Gorley; Jon Nite
- Producers: Jon Randall; Ross Copperman

Dierks Bentley singles chronology
"Burning Man" (2018)	"Living" (2019)	"Gone" (2020)

"Living" is a song co-written and recorded by American country music singer Dierks Bentley. It was released in February 2019 as the third single from Bentley's 2018 album The Mountain. Bentley co-wrote the song with Ross Copperman, Ashley Gorley, and Jon Nite.

== Commercial performance ==
Living reached No. 1 on Billboard's Country Airplay dated September 28, 2019, which is Bentley's 17th No. 1 on the chart. The song has sold 79,000 copies in the United States as of October 2019.

== Music video ==
The official video of the song, directed by Wes Edwards, features Bentley and his son Knox spending quality time together by playing in their backyard, as well as various other places such as a water park, a go-kart track, and a laser tag arena.

== Charts ==
=== Weekly charts ===
Chart (2019)	Peak position
Canada Hot 100 (Billboard)	98
Canada Country (Billboard)	1
US Billboard Hot 100	51
US Country Airplay (Billboard)	1
US Hot Country Songs (Billboard)	6

=== Year-end charts ===
Chart (2019)	Position
US Country Airplay (Billboard)	12
US Hot Country Songs (Billboard)	35

== Certifications ==
Region	Certification	Certified units/sales
United States (RIAA)	2× Platinum	2,000,000^{‡}
^{‡} Sales+streaming figures based on certification alone.
