= Wine, Beer, Whiskey =

2020 single by Little Big Town

Single by Little Big Town

from the album Nightfall
- Released: June 1, 2020
- Genre: Country
- Length: 3:16 (album version); 3:04 (radio edit)
- Label: Capitol Nashville
- Songwriters: Tofer Brown; Karen Fairchild; Sean McConnell; Kimberley Schlapman; Phillip Sweet; Jimi Westbrook
- Producer: Little Big Town

Little Big Town singles chronology
"Over Drinking" (2019)	"Wine, Beer, Whiskey" (2020)	"Never Love You Again" (2021)

"Wine, Beer, Whiskey" is a song recorded by American country music group Little Big Town from their ninth studio album, Nightfall (2020). It was released to country radio as the album's third single on June 1, 2020. The music video premiered on November 7, 2020.

The song was written by the four members of Little Big Town — Karen Fairchild, Kimberly Schlapman, Phillip Sweet and Jimi Westbrook — alongside Tofer Brown and Sean McConnell, and produced by the band.

== Critical reception ==
In his review of Nightfall, Billy Dukes with Taste of Country called the song "the perfect interruption" and one of the album's best single choices, comparing it to their own song "Pontoon", but maintaining that it still felt fresh. Maura Johnson of Entertainment Weekly called it "a raucous, horn-assisted party, the four members saluting bar fixtures like 'Jack' and 'Tito' the way old friends might as last call hits."

== Live performances ==
Little Big Town performed the song on live TV for the first time on June 1, 2020 on the Tonight Show with Jimmy Fallon. The band also performed it on the CMT Music Awards on October 21, 2020 as the show's closing performance.

== Commercial performance ==
"Wine, Beer, Whiskey" debuted at number 59 on the Billboard Country Airplay chart dated July 25, 2020. It also debuted at number 100 on the Billboard Hot 100, becoming the group's first single to reach the chart since 2016's "Better Man".

== Charts ==
=== Weekly charts ===
Chart (2020–2021)	Peak position
Canada Country (Billboard)	46
US Billboard Hot 100	100
US Country Airplay (Billboard)	32
US Hot Country Songs (Billboard)	23

=== Year-end charts ===
Chart (2020)	Position
US Hot Country Songs (Billboard)	90
Chart (2021)	Position
US Hot Country Songs (Billboard)	58

== Certifications ==
Region	Certification	Certified units/sales
Canada (Music Canada)	Platinum	80,000^{‡}
United States (RIAA)	2× Platinum	2,000,000^{‡}
^{‡} Sales+streaming figures based on certification alone.
