= Rum (song) =

Country song by Brothers Osborne about rum

Single by Brothers Osborne

from the album Pawn Shop
- Released: March 31, 2014
- Genre: Country
- Length: 3:34 (album version); 3:28 (EP version)
- Label: EMI Nashville
- Songwriters: John Osborne; T. J. Osborne; Barry Dean
- Producers: Brad Hill; Brothers Osborne

Brothers Osborne singles chronology
"Let's Go There" (2013)	"Rum" (2014)	"Stay a Little Longer" (2015)

"Rum" is a song recorded by American country music duo Brothers Osborne. The song was written by the duo, along with Barry Dean. It was released in March 2014 as the lead single from their first extended play Brothers Osborne and debut album Pawn Shop in 2016.

== Critical reception ==
Billy Dukes of Taste of Country gave the song a favorable review, writing that "‘Rum’ has a garage rock quality to it. Sparse percussion backs John Osborne's guitar lick before brother T.J. begins his story." Bobby Peacock of Roughstock also reviewed the song favorably, saying that "the lyrical content is elevated to originality by way of nonstandard lyrics and phrasing, most notably on the chorus." Peacock added that "the best and most distinctive feature is the production, which is loose, stripped-down, and funky just like its predecessor."

== Music video ==
The music video was directed by Peter Zavadil and premiered in July 2014. It was filmed in their hometown of Deale, Maryland.

== Chart performance ==
"Rum" debuted at number 55 on the U.S. Billboard Country Airplay chart for the week of April 12, 2014. It also debuted at number 50 on the U.S. Billboard Hot Country Songs chart for the week of June 14, 2014.

Chart (2014)	Peak position
US Country Airplay (Billboard)	27
US Hot Country Songs (Billboard)	34

=== Year-end charts ===
Chart (2014)	Position
US Country Airplay (Billboard)	90
US Hot Country Songs (Billboard)	96

== Certifications ==
Region	Certification	Certified units/sales
United States (RIAA)	Gold	500,000^{‡}
^{‡} Sales+streaming figures based on certification alone.
