= The Mountain (Dierks Bentley album) =

Studio album by Dierks Bentley
- Released: June 8, 2018
- Recorded: November 2017
- Genre: Country
- Length: 47:13
- Label: Capitol Records Nashville
- Producer: Jon Randall; Ross Copperman

Dierks Bentley chronology
| Black (2016) | The Mountain (2018) | Gravel & Gold (2023) |

Singles from The Mountain
- 1. "Woman, Amen" Released: January 17, 2018; 2. "Burning Man" Released: May 31, 2018; 3. "Living" Released: February 25, 2019

The Mountain is the ninth studio album by American country music artist Dierks Bentley. It was released on June 8, 2018, by Capitol Records Nashville. It features the singles "Woman, Amen", "Burning Man" (a duet with Brothers Osborne) and "Living". The album was co-produced by Jon Randall and Ross Copperman.

== Content ==
Bentley wrote 10 of the 13 songs on the album. Most of it was written after he performed at the Telluride Bluegrass Festival in Telluride, Colorado. He recorded it at the Studio in the Clouds in that town in November 2017. According to Bentley, the album mixes the bluegrass influence of his 2010 album Up on the Ridge with the rock music influence of his previous disc, 2016's Black. Serving as record producers are those two albums' respective producers, Jon Randall and Ross Copperman.

The album includes two vocal collaborations: "Burning Man" featuring Brothers Osborne and "Travelin' Light" featuring Brandi Carlile. Bluegrass musicians Jerry Douglas, Sam Bush, and Tim O'Brien are also featured.

== Commercial performance ==
The Mountain debuted at No. 1 on Billboard's Top Country Albums and No. 3 on the US Billboard 200, with 102,000 album-equivalent units, 94,000 of which are traditional album sales. The album is Dierks Bentley's ninth top 10 and the best debut sales week of his career. It sold another 13,400 copies (18,200 units) in the second week. It has sold 193,400 copies in the United States as of September 2019.

== Critical reception ==
Rolling Stone praised the album, particularly the track "You Can't Bring Me Down," with writer Luke Levenson commenting, "Dierks Bentley is continuing his celebration of resilience and strength with "You Can't Bring Me Down," which, following previous releases "Woman, Amen," "The Mountain," and "Living," returns the production level to its basics."

== Track listing ==
| No. | Title | Writer(s) | Length |
|---|---|---|---|
| 1. | "Burning Man" (featuring Brothers Osborne) | Bobby Pinson; Luke Dick | 3:58 |
| 2. | "The Mountain" | Dierks Bentley; Dick; Natalie Hemby; Jon Randall | 4:44 |
| 3. | "Living" | Bentley; Ross Copperman; Ashley Gorley; Jon Nite | 3:42 |
| 4. | "Woman, Amen" | Bentley; Copperman; Josh Kear | 3:00 |
| 5. | "You Can't Bring Me Down" | Bentley; Luke Laird; Hillary Lindsey | 4:46 |
| 6. | "Nothing On but the Stars" | Bentley; Nite; Randall; Ross Copperman | 3:47 |
| 7. | "Goodbye in Telluride" | Bentley; Gorley; Copperman; Scooter Carusoe | 3:09 |
| 8. | "My Religion" | Ben Burgess; Jamie Kenney; Michael Pollack; Rick Markowitz | 3:05 |
| 9. | "One Way" | Bentley; Jeff Hyde; Laura Veltz | 3:37 |
| 10. | "Son of the Sun" | Bentley; Nite; Randall; Copperman | 3:10 |
| 11. | "Stranger to Myself" | Bentley; Heather Morgan; Copperman | 3:24 |
| 12. | "Travelin' Light" (featuring Brandi Carlile) | Bentley; Gorley; Nite | 3:14 |
| 13. | "How I'm Going Out" | Jessi Alexander; Randall | 3:38 |
| Total length: | | | 47:13 |

== Personnel ==
Adapted from The Mountain liner notes.

Musicians

- Dierks Bentley – lead vocals (all tracks), background vocals (1–4, 7, 8)
- Alan Bradbury – background vocals (1, 2)
- Sam Bush – mandolin (5, 7, 12)
- Brandi Carlile – duet vocals (12)
- Matt Chamberlain – drums (all tracks), percussion (1, 2, 5, 9–11), programming (8)
- Ross Copperman – acoustic guitar (3, 6, 7, 10, 11), electric guitar (3, 6, 7), background vocals (3–7, 9), keyboards (3, 4, 6, 7, 10, 11), programming (3, 4, 6, 7, 11), percussion (6, 7, 11)
- Luke Dick – acoustic guitar (1), electric guitar (1, 2), background vocals (1, 2), percussion (1), programming (1)
- Jerry Douglas – Dobro (8, 12)
- Dan Dugmore – electric guitar (3, 10), pedal steel guitar (9, 11, 13)
- Ian Fitchuk – bass guitar (all tracks), keyboards (1, 2, 4, 5, 10, 13), bass synthesizer (6)
- Ben Helson – banjo (2, 5, 12), acoustic guitar (3, 4, 7–11), mandolin (4)
- Dan Hochhalter – fiddle (2, 5, 9)
- Jedd Hughes – electric guitar (all tracks), acoustic guitar (1, 4, 5)
- Josh Kear – background vocals (4)
- Jamie Kenney – keyboards (8)
- Hillary Lindsey – background vocals (5)
- Rob McNelley – electric guitar (1, 5–7, 10, 11)
- Heather Morgan – background vocals (11)
- Jon Nite – background vocals (3, 6)
- Tim O'Brien – background vocals (1), fiddle (1), bouzouki (8)
- John Osborne – electric guitar (1)
- T. J. Osborne – lead vocals (1)
- Danny Rader – acoustic guitar (6, 7), electric guitar (6, 7), keyboards (6, 7), banjo (7), bouzouki (7), programming (7)
- Jon Randall – acoustic guitar (2–6, 9–13), mandolin (4, 5), background vocals (5, 7, 9, 10, 13)
- F. Reid Shippen – bass synthesizer (1), programming (3, 4)

Technical

- Arturo Buenahora Jr. – executive production
- Ross Copperman – production
- Pete Lyman – mastering
- Jon Randall – production
- F. Reid Shippen – recording, mixing

== Charts ==
=== Weekly charts ===
| Chart (2018) | Peak position |
|---|---|
| Australian Albums (ARIA) | 58 |
| Canadian Albums (Billboard) | 10 |
| New Zealand Heatseeker Albums (RMNZ) | 8 |
| Scottish Albums (OCC) | 92 |
| US Billboard 200 | 3 |
| US Top Country Albums (Billboard) | 1 |

=== Year-end charts ===
| Chart (2018) | Position |
|---|---|
| US Billboard 200 | 166 |
| Top Country Albums (Billboard) | 23 |
| Chart (2019) | Position |
| Top Country Albums (Billboard) | 32 |

== Certifications ==
| Region | Certification | Certified units/sales |
|---|---|---|
| Canada (Music Canada) | Platinum | 80,000^{‡} |
| United States (RIAA) | Gold | 500,000^{‡} |
^{‡} Sales+streaming figures based on certification alone.
