= Burning Man (song) =

Single by Dierks Bentley with Brothers Osborne

from the album The Mountain
- Released: May 31, 2018
- Genre: Country
- Length: 3:58
- Label: Capitol Nashville
- Songwriter(s): Bobby Pinson; Luke Dick
- Producer(s): Ross Copperman; Jon Randall

Dierks Bentley singles chronology
"Woman, Amen" (2018)	"Burning Man" (2018)	"Living" (2019)

Brothers Osborne singles chronology
"Shoot Me Straight" (2018)	"Burning Man" (2018)	"I Don't Remember Me (Before You)" (2018)

"Burning Man" is a song written by Bobby Pinson and Luke Dick and recorded by American country music singer Dierks Bentley as a collaboration with American country music duo Brothers Osborne. It was released in May 2018 as the second single from Bentley's 2018 album The Mountain.

== History ==
Co-writer Luke Dick said of the song, "The chorus is the idea of being a walking contradiction in some regards. There is — especially for artistic types‚ the feeling of wanting to wander or be out in the world, but also the desire to be grounded in some way too". This "contradiction" is expressed in the lyric "I'm a little bit holy water but still a little bit burning man." He said that he did not have the idea until he began to write songs with Bobby Pinson, and after completing the song, the two chose to offer it to Bentley. Bentley said that he felt an "immediate connection" to the lyrics upon hearing the song, and that he identified with its theme of having contradictory elements to one's personality, given his own life as both a touring musician and a father.

The duo Brothers Osborne is featured on the track: T.J. Osborne provides duet vocals, while John Osborne plays lead guitar. Bentley said that he wanted to include an artist who was comparatively younger, and that when he sent a text message to the brothers asking if they wanted to record, they responded in only two minutes.

== Commercial performance ==
Burning Man peaked at No. 5 on Billboard's Hot Country Songs, and No. 2 on Country Airplay (No. 1 on Mediabase), for charts dated February 2, 2019. The song has sold 149,000 copies in the United States as of March 2019.

== Music video ==
The song's music video was directed by Wes Edwards. It features Bentley and the Brothers Osborne performing the song near the Salton Sea, interspersed with touring footage. According to Bentley, several crew members suffered heatstroke while filming the video.

== Personnel ==
From The Mountain liner notes.

- Alan Bradbury – background vocals
- Dierks Bentley – lead and background vocals
- Matt Chamberlain – drums, percussion
- Luke Dick – acoustic guitar, electric guitar, background vocals, percussion, programming
- Ian Fitchuk – bass guitar, keyboards
- Jedd Hughes – acoustic guitar, electric guitar
- Rob McNelley – electric guitar
- Tim O'Brien – background vocals, fiddle
- John Osborne – electric guitar
- T. J. Osborne – lead vocals
- F. Reid Shippen – bass synthesizer

== Charts ==
=== Weekly charts ===
Chart (2018–2019)	Peak position
Canada (Canadian Hot 100)	72
Canada Country (Billboard)	1
US Billboard Hot 100	45
US Country Airplay (Billboard)	2
US Hot Country Songs (Billboard)	5

=== Year-end charts ===
Chart (2018)	Position
US Hot Country Songs (Billboard)	66
Chart (2019)	Position
US Country Airplay (Billboard)	47
US Hot Country Songs (Billboard)	55

== Certifications ==
Region	Certification	Certified units/sales
Canada (Music Canada)	Gold	40,000^{‡}
United States (RIAA)	2× Platinum	2,000,000^{‡}
^{‡} Sales+streaming figures based on certification alone.
