= Pawn Shop (album) =

Studio album by Brothers Osborne
- Released: January 15, 2016
- Studios: St. Charles, Blackbird Studio, Hill Studios and Maverick Recording (Nashville, Tennessee)
- Genre: Country
- Length: 38:58
- Label: EMI Nashville
- Producers: Jay Joyce; Brad Hill; Brothers Osborne

Brothers Osborne chronology
Brothers Osborne (2014)	Pawn Shop (2016)	Port Saint Joe (2018)

Singles from Pawn Shop
- 1. "Stay a Little Longer" Released: March 10, 2015; 2. "21 Summer" Released: February 29, 2016; 3. "It Ain't My Fault" Released: January 17, 2017

Pawn Shop is the debut studio album by American country music duo Brothers Osborne. It was released on January 15, 2016, via EMI Nashville. It includes the singles "Stay a Little Longer", "21 Summer", and "It Ain't My Fault". A 10th anniversary edition of the album was released on February 13, 2026.

== Content ==
Both members of the duo (John and T.J. Osborne) co-wrote nearly every song on the album, except "Heart Shaped Locket", on which only TJ was a co-writer. Jay Joyce produced the album except for "Rum" and "Heart Shaped Locket", which the duo produced with Brad Hill. Both "Rum" and "Stay a Little Longer" previously appeared on their self-titled EP, although the latter was re-recorded. "Rum" was originally issued as a single off the EP in 2014, followed by the re-recording of "Stay a Little Longer" as the lead single from Pawn Shop. "21 Summer" and "It Ain't My Fault" were the album's second and third singles.

== Critical reception ==
Rating it 4 out of 5 stars, Allmusic critic Stephen Thomas Erlewine felt that the album's sound combined modern and traditional country influences, staying that "Sanded and varnished though they may be, the pair feel fresh, their chemistry easy and natural, so they pull off their spiffy retroact with style." Jeffrey B. Remz of Country Standard Time made note of Southern rock and outlaw country influences in the sound, while also comparing T.J.'s voice to that of Trace Adkins. His review highlighted the lyrics to "It Ain't My Fault" and the instrumentation of "Stay a Little Longer", concluding that there were "no weak songs". Markos Papadatos of Digital Journal rated it "A−", calling it "a well-crafted project from start to finish" and praising the songwriting and arrangement of the singles in particular.

== Commercial performance ==
The album debuted at No. 3 on the Top Country Albums album, and No. 17 on the Billboard 200, selling 21,000 copies in its first week. It sold a further 6,100 copies in its second week. The album was certified Gold on November 16, 2017. It has sold 237,100 copies in the US as of October 2019.

== Accolades ==
Publication	Accolade	Year	Rank
American Songwriter	Top 50 Albums of 2016	2016	48
Entertainment Weekly	The Best Country Albums of 2016	2016	7
Rolling Stone	40 Best Country Albums of 2016	2016	7
Uproxx	The 20 Best Country Albums of 2016	2016	4

== Track listing ==
No.	Title	Writer(s)	Length
1.	"Dirt Rich"	John Osborne, TJ Osborne, Barry Dean	2:51
2.	"21 Summer"	J. Osborne, TJ Osborne, Craig Wiseman	3:34
3.	"Stay a Little Longer"	J. Osborne, TJ Osborne, Shane McAnally	5:36
4.	"Pawn Shop"	J. Osborne, TJ Osborne, Sean McConnell	2:45
5.	"Rum"	J. Osborne, TJ Osborne, Dean	3:34
6.	"Loving Me Back" (featuring Lee Ann Womack)	J. Osborne, TJ Osborne, Casey Beathard	4:19
7.	"American Crazy"	J. Osborne, TJ Osborne, Ross Copperman	2:40
8.	"Greener Pastures"	J. Osborne, TJ Osborne, Ryan Hurd, Maren Morris	2:53
9.	"Down Home"	J. Osborne, TJ Osborne, Jessi Alexander	3:39
10.	"Heart Shaped Locket"	TJ Osborne, Lisa Carver, Andi Zack	3:37
11.	"It Ain't My Fault"	J. Osborne, TJ Osborne, Lee Thomas Miller	3:36

10-year anniversary deluxe edition bonus tracks
No.	Title	Writer(s)	Length
12.	"Arms of Fire"	J. Osborne, TJ Osborne, Tim Nichols, Connie Harrington	4:02
13.	"Love the Lonely Out of You" (Live Pinebox Version)	J. Osborne, TJ Osborne, Harrington	5:29
14.	"Pins and Needles" (Unreleased Track)	J. Osborne, TJ Osborne, Natalie Hemby	3:21
15.	"Stay a Little Longer" (Demo)	J. Osborne, TJ Osborne, McAnally	4:20
16.	"Shoot from the Hip"	J. Osborne, TJ Osborne, Will Anderson	3:32
17.	"21 Summer" (Demo)	J. Osborne, TJ Osborne, Wiseman	3:28

== Personnel ==
From Pawn Shop liner notes.

Brothers Osborne

- John Osborne – autoharp, acoustic guitar, baritone guitar, electric guitars, 12-string guitar, banjo, mandolin, pedal steel guitar, bass guitar, percussion, backing vocals
- T.J. Osborne – lead vocals, acoustic guitar, percussion

Additional Musicians

- Dave Cohen – acoustic piano, Hammond B3 organ
- Ian Fitchuk – Wurlitzer electric piano, Hammond B3 organ, percussion
- Jay Joyce – acoustic piano, Hammond B3 organ, guitars, percussion
- Jon Green – acoustic guitar
- Lee Holland – acoustic guitar, percussion
- Josh Matheny – lap steel guitar
- Rich Brinsfield – bass guitar, upright bass
- Rachel Loy – bass guitar
- Pete Sternberg – bass guitar, bass pedals
- Adam Box – drums, percussion
- Lee Ann Womack – backing vocals (6)
- Lucie Silvas – backing vocals (11)

Group vocals on "21 Summer"

- John Osborne, Natalie Osborne, T.J. Osborne, Lucie Silvas and Pete Sternberg

=== Production ===
- Jay Joyce – producer (1–4, 6–9, 11), mixing (1–4, 6–9, 11)
- Brad Hill – producer (5, 10), recording (5, 10), digital editing (5, 10)
- Brothers Osborne – producers (5, 10)
- Jason Hall – recording (1–4, 6–9, 11), mixing (1–4, 6–9, 11)
- Ryan Gore – mixing (5, 10)
- Paul Cossette – assistant engineer (1–4, 6–9, 11)
- Caleb VanBuskirk – assistant engineer (1–4, 6–9, 11)
- Leland Elliott – recording assistant (5, 10)
- Andrew Mendelson – mastering at Georgetown Masters (Nashville, Tennessee)
- Melissa Spillman – production assistant (1–4, 6–9, 11)
- Scott Johnson – production assistant (5, 10)
- Karen Naff – art direction
- Craig Allen – design
- Jim Wright – photography
- John Peets for Q Prime South – management

== Chart performance ==
=== Weekly charts ===
Chart (2016)	Peak position
Canadian Albums (Billboard)	32
US Billboard 200	17
US Top Country Albums (Billboard)	3

=== Year-end charts ===
Chart (2016)	Position
US Top Country Albums (Billboard)	28
Chart (2017)	Position
US Top Country Albums (Billboard)	32
Chart (2018)	Position
US Top Country Albums (Billboard)	85

== Certifications ==
Certifications for Pawn Shop
Region	Certification	Certified units/sales
United States (RIAA)	Platinum	1,000,000^{‡}
^{‡} Sales+streaming figures based on certification alone.
