= Port Saint Joe (album) =

Studio album by Brothers Osborne
- Released: April 20, 2018
- Studio: Port Saint Joe and Neon Cross (Nashville, Tennessee)
- Genre: Country
- Length: 37:56
- Label: EMI Nashville
- Producer: Jay Joyce

Brothers Osborne chronology
Pawn Shop (2016)	Port Saint Joe (2018)	Live at the Ryman (2019)

Singles from Port Saint Joe
- 1. "Shoot Me Straight" Released: January 16, 2018; 2. "I Don't Remember Me (Before You)" Released: October 8, 2018

Port Saint Joe is the second studio album by American country music duo Brothers Osborne. It was released on April 20, 2018, through EMI Nashville. "Shoot Me Straight" is the album's lead single. The second single "I Don't Remember Me (Before You)" was released on October 8, 2018.

== Commercial performance ==
The album debuted at No. 2 on Billboard's Top Country Albums and No. 15 on the Billboard 200, selling 19,000 copies (22,000 album-equivalent units) in its first week. It has sold 90,600 copies in the United States as of October 2019.

== Track listing ==
No.	Title	Writer(s)	Length
1.	"Slow Your Roll"	John Osborne; TJ Osborne; Barry Dean; Troy Verges	2:58
2.	"Shoot Me Straight"	J. Osborne; TJ Osborne; Lee Thomas Miller	6:24
3.	"I Don't Remember Me (Before You)"	J. Osborne; TJ Osborne; Shane McAnally; Matt Dragstrem	3:12
4.	"Weed, Whiskey and Willie"	J. Osborne; TJ Osborne; Laura Veltz	4:20
5.	"Tequila Again"	J. Osborne; TJ Osborne; Kendell Marvel	3:31
6.	"A Couple Wrongs Makin' It Alright"	J. Osborne; TJ Osborne; Connie Harrington	2:54
7.	"Pushing Up Daisies (Love Alive)"	J. Osborne; TJ Osborne; Marvel	3:39
8.	"Drank Like Hank"	J. Osborne; TJ Osborne; Marvel	3:09
9.	"A Little Bit Trouble"	J. Osborne; TJ Osborne; Dave Barnes	4:04
10.	"While You Still Can"	J. Osborne; TJ Osborne; Travis Meadows	3:44

== Personnel ==
Adapted from Port Saint Joe liner notes.

Brothers Osborne

- John Osborne – acoustic guitars, electric guitars, mandolin, steel guitar, handclaps, backing vocals
- T. J. Osborne – lead vocals, acoustic guitars, handclaps

Additional musicians

- Jay Joyce – keyboards, programming, electric guitars, percussion, shaker, tambourine, backing vocals
- Pete Sternberg – bass guitar
- Adam Box – drums, handclaps
- Jason Graumlich – backing vocals (1)
- Lucie Silvas – backing vocals (6, 9)

Production

- Brian Wright – A&R
- Jay Joyce – producer, mixing
- Jason Hall – recording, mixing
- Jaxon Hargrove – recording assistant
- Jimmy Mansfield – recording assistant
- Andrew Mendelson – mastering at Georgetown Masters (Nashville, Tennessee)
- Melissa Spillman – production assistant
- Karen Naff – art direction
- Craig Allen – design
- Alysse Gafkjen – photography
- John Peets for Q Prime South – management

== Charts ==
=== Weekly charts ===
Chart (2018)	Peak position
Canadian Albums (Billboard)	30
Scottish Albums (OCC)	15
UK Albums (OCC)	47
US Billboard 200	15
US Top Country Albums (Billboard)	2

=== Year-end charts ===
Chart (2018)	Position
US Top Country Albums (Billboard)	64
