= Nightfall (Little Big Town album) =

Studio album by Little Big Town
- Released: January 17, 2020
- Studios: Sound Emporium (Nashville); House of Blues (Nashville); Dark Horse (Franklin); Blackbird (Nashville); Southern Ground (Nashville); Ivory & Rye (Nashville)
- Genre: Country
- Length: 46:13
- Label: Capitol Nashville
- Producers: Tofer Brown; Ian Fitchuk; Jon Green; Little Big Town; Daniel Tashian

Little Big Town chronology
The Breaker (2017)	Nightfall (2020)	Mr. Sun (2022)

Singles from Nightfall
- 1. "The Daughters" Released: April 5, 2019; 2. "Over Drinking" Released: September 16, 2019; 3. "Wine, Beer, Whiskey" Released: June 1, 2020

Nightfall is the ninth studio album by American country music group Little Big Town. It was released on January 17, 2020, by Capitol Nashville, and was self produced by Little Big Town with major production assistance from Daniel Tashian and Ian Fitchuk. It includes the singles "Over Drinking", "The Daughters", and "Wine, Beer, Whiskey". It was nominated for the Grammy Award for Best Country Album and both "The Daughters" and "Sugar Coat" were nominated for the Grammy Award for Best Country Duo/Group Performance.

== Critical reception ==
Professional ratings
Aggregate scores
Source	Rating
Metacritic	74/100
Review scores
Source	Rating
AllMusic	4/5 stars
Entertainment Weekly	B+
No Ripcord	6/10

Nightfall received positive reviews from music critics, respectively. At Metacritic, which assigns a normalized rating out of 100 to reviews from mainstream critics, the album has an average score of 74 based on 4 reviews, indicating "generally favorable reviews".

The album placed fourth on the Billboard list of Top Country Albums of 2020. Billboard editors described the band as reaching "substantive emotional richness that few groups can touch" on the album.

Stephen Thomas Erlewine of AllMusic wrote that "The labor is evident, particularly in the careful construction of the compositions and the subtle shading on individual tracks" and "it's music for meditative mornings or for afternoons in need of a dose of consolation and comfort." He also compared the band's sound favorably to Fleetwood Mac.

== Commercial performance ==
Nightfall debuted at No. 1 on the Top Country Albums chart with 31,000 equivalent album units, 26,000 in of which are in traditional album sales. As of March 2020, it has sold 43,800 copies in the United States.

== Track listing ==
All tracks are produced by Little Big Town, except where noted.

Nightfall track listing
No.	Title	Writer(s)	Lead vocals	Length
1.	"Next to You"	Michael Jade; Trevor Jarvis; Hillary Reynolds	Karen Fairchild; Jimi Westbrook	4:06
2.	"Nightfall" (prod.: Little Big Town, Ian Fitchuk, Daniel Tashian)	Karen Fairchild; Fancy Hagood; Daniel Tashian	Fairchild	3:21
3.	"Forever and a Night"	Fairchild; Phillip Sweet; Foy Vance; Jimi Westbrook	Phillip Sweet	4:26
4.	"Throw Your Love Away"	Fairchild; Hillary Lindsey; Lori McKenna; Liz Rose; Kimberly Schlapman	Kimberly Schlapman	3:44
5.	"Over Drinking"	Cary Barlowe; Jesse Frasure; Ashley Gorley; Steph Jones; Lindsey	Fairchild	3:10
6.	"Wine, Beer, Whiskey"	Tofer Brown; Fairchild; Sean McConnell; Schlapman; Sweet; Westbrook	Westbrook	3:16
7.	"Questions" (prod.: Little Big Town, Jon Green)	Fairchild; Jon Green; Sara Haze	Fairchild	3:04
8.	"The Daughters"	Ashley Ray; Fairchild; McConnell	Fairchild	3:32
9.	"River of Stars" (prod.: Little Big Town, Fitchuk, Tashian)	Fairchild; Fitchuk; Tashian	Fairchild; Westbrook	3:37
10.	"Sugar Coat" (prod.: Little Big Town, Tofer Brown)	Josh Kerr; McKenna; Jordyn Shellhart	Fairchild	3:40
11.	"Problem Child" (prod.: Little Big Town, Brown)	Brown; Fairchild; McConnell; Schlapman; Sweet; Westbrook	Westbrook	3:35
12.	"Bluebird" (prod.: Little Big Town, Fitchuk, Tashian)	Fairchild; Fitchuk; Tashian	Fairchild	3:11
13.	"Trouble with Forever"	Marc Beeson; Haze; Jason Saenz	Fairchild	3:31
Total length:				46:13

== Personnel ==
Little Big Town

- Karen Fairchild – vocals, art direction
- Kimberley Schlapman – vocals
- Phillip Sweet – vocals, acoustic guitar
- Jimi Westbrook – vocals, acoustic guitar

Additional musicians

- Avery Bright – viola (10, 11)
- Tofer Brown – electric guitar (1, 10), programming (6, 10); background vocals, guitar, percussion (6); piano (10, 11); acoustic guitar, baritone guitar, bass guitar, celesta, organ (10); synthesizer (11)
- Jacob Bryant – trumpet (6)
- Zach Casebolt – violin (10, 11)
- Matt Combs – violin (10, 11)
- Spencer Cullum Jr. – pedal steel guitar (4)
- Ian Fitchuk – drums (2, 9, 12); bass guitar, acoustic guitar, keyboards, percussion (9, 12)
- Cara Fox – cello (10, 11)
- Jesse Frasure – programming (5)
- Tim Galloway – guitar (3), acoustic guitar (4)
- Dan Grech-Marguerat – additional programming (1, 7, 8, 10, 11)
- Jon Green – guitar (7)
- Jedd Hughes – guitar (6, 13), background vocals (6), electric guitar (8)
- Claire Indie – cello (10, 11)
- Katelyn Kelly – violin (10, 11)
- Hillary Lindsey – acoustic guitar (5)
- Todd Lombardo (Note: Lombardo is erroneously credited as "Tom Lombardo" on tracks 2 and 12.) – acoustic guitar (2, 9, 12)
- Sean McConnell – background vocals (6); acoustic guitar, programming (8)
- Hubert Payne – drums (1, 3–8, 10, 11, 13), percussion (6)
- K.S. Rhoads – conductor (10, 11)
- Daniel Tashian – electric guitar, programming (2, 9, 12); bass guitar (2); baritone guitar, lap steel guitar, mandolin (9, 12)
- John Thomasson – bass guitar (1, 3–8, 13)
- Akil Thompson – keyboards (1, 4, 5, 7, 8, 13), guitar (1, 6), Hammond B-3 organ (3)
- Foy Vance – piano (3)
- Evan Weatherford – guitar (1, 3–5, 7, 13), slide guitar (8)
- Kristin Weber – violin (10, 11)
- Kris Wilkinson – viola (10, 11)

Technical

- Emily Lazar – mastering
- Dan Grech-Marguerat – mixing (1, 7, 8, 10, 11)
- Ryan Hewitt – mixing (2–4, 6, 9, 12, 13), vocal recording (2, 12)
- Manny Marroquin – mixing (5)
- Jason Hall – recording (1)
- Craig Alvin – recording (2, 9, 12)
- Josh Reynolds – recording (3, 5–8, 10, 11, 13), vocal recording (6, 8)
- Justin Francis – recording (9, 12)
- Tofer Brown – recording (10, 11)
- Chris Galland – mix engineering (5)
- Scott Johnson – production assistance
- Chris Allgood – mastering assistance
- Joel Davies – mixing assistance (1, 7, 8, 10, 11)
- Charles Haydon Hicks – mixing assistance (1, 7, 8, 10, 11)
- Robin Florent – mixing assistance (5)
- Scott Desmarais – mixing assistance (5)
- Zaq Reynolds – recording assistance (1, 3, 5–8, 10, 11), vocal recording assistance (2, 12)
- Zack Pancoast – recording assistance (1, 9, 12)
- Gavin Mellberg – recording assistance (5)
- Dan Davis – recording assistance (9, 12)
- Rachael Moore – recording assistance (10, 11)

Visuals

- Ashley Kohorst – art direction, design
- Reid Long – art direction, design, photography
- Becky Fluke – art direction, photography
- Kelly Russell Jarrell – art direction
- Richard Collins – hair and makeup
- Karan Mitchell – hair and makeup
- Karla Welch – wardrobe styling
- Grace Wrightsell – wardrobe styling assistance
- Kera Jackson – art production

== Charts ==
=== Weekly charts ===
Weekly chart performance for Nightfall
Chart (2020)	Peak position
Australian Albums (ARIA)	88
Canadian Albums (Billboard)	65
Scottish Albums (Official Charts)	40
UK Album Downloads (Official Charts)	27
UK Physical Albums (OCC)	71
UK Country Albums (Official Charts)	1
US Billboard 200	13
US Top Country Albums (Billboard)	1

=== Year-end charts ===
2020 year-end chart performance for Nighfall
Chart (2020)	Position
US Top Current Album Sales (Billboard)	91
US Top Country Albums (Billboard)	69
