= Brad Hill (producer) =

American record producer (born 1981)

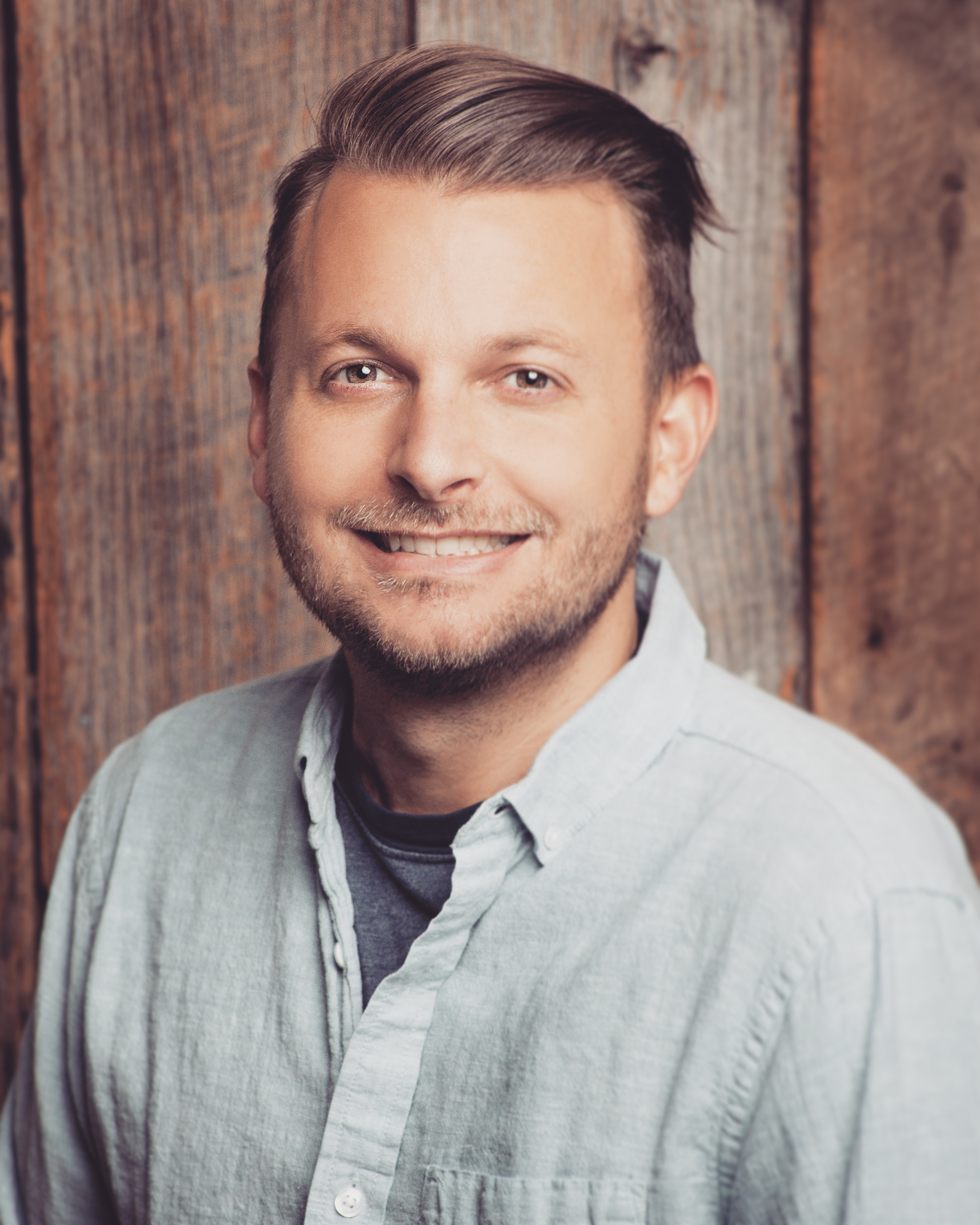

Background information
- Born: August 13, 1981 (age 44); Orange, California, U.S.
- Occupations: Record producer, engineer, musician
- Instrument: Guitar
- Years active: 2005–present

Brad Hill is an American record producer, audio engineer, and musician originally from Southern California.

== Biography ==
Growing up in San Diego, Brad listened to all different kinds of music from an early age. He began playing classical violin at the age of 7, and started studying guitar during his high school years.

Hill moved to Nashville, Tennessee in 2002 to attend Belmont University's commercial music program. Upon graduating, he started producing and engineering for publishing companies in town. He eventually began working with the duo Brothers Osborne, and co-produced their self-titled EP and two songs from their debut album Pawn Shop.

He subsequently met Maren Morris and co-produced her self-titled EP in the fall of 2015. He also co-produced three songs on her debut album Hero, which garnered him a Grammy nomination for country album of the year, as well as Country Music Association and Academy of Country Music nominations for album of the year. In response to the 2017 Las Vegas shooting, Morris released "Dear Hate", a song she had written and recorded with Vince Gill, which was produced and engineered by Hill.

Hill has produced songs for many country acts including Brett Young, Maren Morris, Lucie Silvas, Brothers Osborne, The Swon Brothers, Josh Gracin, Owen Riegling, and The Henningsens.

Brad Hill currently resides in Nashville, Tennessee.

== Discography ==
- Maren Morris | Dear Hate (Producer, Engineer)
- Maren Morris | Hero (Producer, Engineer)
- Brothers Osborne | Pawn Shop (Producer, Engineer)
- Swon Brothers | Pretty Cool Scars (Producer, Engineer)
- Lucie Silvas | Letters to Ghosts (Engineer, Mixing)
- Brett Young | Country in California (Producer, engineer, Mixing)
- Josh Gracin | Nothing Like Us (Producer, Engineer)
- Sammy Arriaga | Meet in the Middle (Producer, Engineer)
- The Henningsens | World's on Fire (Producer, Engineer)
- Tyrone Wells | Where We Meet (Composer, producer, Engineer)
