= I Don't Remember Me (Before You) =

Single by Brothers Osborne

from the album Port Saint Joe
- Released: October 8, 2018
- Genre: Country
- Length: 3:12
- Label: EMI Nashville
- Songwriters: T.J. Osborne; John Osborne; Shane McAnally; Matt Dragstrem
- Producer: Jay Joyce

Brothers Osborne singles chronology
"Shoot Me Straight" (2018)	"I Don't Remember Me (Before You)" (2018)	"All Night" (2020)

"I Don't Remember Me (Before You)" is a song recorded by American country music duo Brothers Osborne. It is the second single from their second studio album Port Saint Joe. The duo's members, T.J. Osborne and John Osborne, wrote the song with Shane McAnally and Matt Dragstrem.

== Content ==
Duo members T.J. Osborne and John Osborne wrote the song with Shane McAnally and Matt Dragstrem. As with the rest of the corresponding album, Jay Joyce was the producer of the track. Billy Dukes of Taste of Country describes the song as "slow vulnerable ballad finds the two burly brothers offering their hearts to a lover." He also thought that by being a ballad, the song put a greater focus on T.J. Osborne's lead vocals than the duo's previous works.

== Music video ==
The song's music video debuted on February 14, 2019. Directed by Wes Edwards and Ryan Silver, it features a bull rider who is recovering from substance abuse.

== Chart performance ==
Chart (2018–2019)	Peak position
US Country Airplay (Billboard)	31
US Hot Country Songs (Billboard)	40

== Certifications ==
Region	Certification	Certified units/sales
United States (RIAA)	Gold	500,000^{‡}
^{‡} Sales+streaming figures based on certification alone.
