= It Ain't My Fault (Brothers Osborne song) =

Single by Brothers Osborne

from the album Pawn Shop
- Released: January 17, 2017
- Genre: Country rock, hard rock
- Length: 3:36
- Label: EMI Nashville
- Songwriter(s): John Osborne; T. J. Osborne; Lee Thomas Miller
- Producer(s): Jay Joyce

Brothers Osborne singles chronology
"Good at Tonight" (2016)	"It Ain't My Fault" (2017)	"Shoot Me Straight" (2018)

"It Ain't My Fault" is a song recorded by American country music duo Brothers Osborne. The song was released in January 2017 as the duo's fifth single overall. Duo members John and T.J. Osborne co-wrote the song with Lee Thomas Miller.

== Content ==
The duo wrote the song with Lee Thomas Miller in mid-2015. The song is about a man who humorously refuses to own up to his own actions, as reflected in the title line. Miller came up with the opening lines about "a chain of events leading to an affair" while using a phone app that simulates drum patterns to create a drum pattern similar to the one used in "(I Can't Get No) Satisfaction". Billboard compared the "series of occurrences that create a cheatin’ scenario" to "Third Rock from the Sun" by Joe Diffie. The recording session featured Jay Joyce as producer, Jason Hall as engineer, along with John Osborne on lead guitar, Adam Box on drums, and Pete Sternberg on bass.

John Osborne told Billboard that "We’ve all been there where we're drunk and stubborn, and we’re not willing to admit it. That’s really what the song’s about. Even the singer knows that it’s his fault." Lead singer T. J. Osborne sings the song in a primarily "darker frequency".

== Music video ==
The official music video was released May 2, 2017 and directed by Wes Edwards and Ryan Silver. The film depicts the brothers as owners of a pawn shop robbed by men wearing rubber masks of U.S. presidents Bill Clinton, George W. Bush, Barack Obama, and Donald Trump, in an homage to the "Ex-Presidents" of the 1991 action crime thriller Point Break and as an implicit criticism of the American political system. The video uses the circumstances of the criminals' escape to make a series of visual gags about the presidents whose masks they wear: "Clinton" ogles a passing woman, "Bush" absentmindedly loses his money, "Obama" is screamed at by a white girl and shot at with a shotgun by her father, and "Trump" upstages an African-American church service acting like he is one of the worshipers, then attempts to pilfer the offering dish, and gets caught up in an angry protest which he escapes from by throwing money to create a distraction.

At the end of the video the four thieves are all stopped by a wall. "Bush" and "Clinton" help "Obama" over the wall. "Obama" is then seen driving a jet-ski to safety in homage to the vacation he took in February 2017 soon after he left office. "Bush" is helped over the wall by standing on "Clinton's" shoulders, he is then seen driving away in a late model pick-up but he leaves his open money bag on the roof of the vehicle, losing the money to the wind as he drives off. "Clinton" then can not get over the wall but escapes when someone wearing a Hillary Clinton mask appears on the top of the wall and reaches down to pull him over. The "Clintons" then escape on a motorcycle driven by "Hillary" with "Bill" adoringly holding onto his wife as she drives them to freedom. "Trump" gets left behind and trapped by the wall in homage to Trump's border wall policy. The police catch "Trump" while the other "presidents" get off scot-free for their crimes.

== Critical reception ==
Billy Dukes of Taste of Country describes the song as a "guitar-drenched, unapologetic jam that’s not likely to please the pop-country crowd". while Jason Scott of AXS said that the duo "hit on all cylinders with their new single". Angela Stefano of The Boot states that the tune "features a steady drum beat and guitar flourishes throughout its verses, which find the Osbornes placing blame for the previous night’s series of events on everyone (and everything) but themselves".

== Chart performance ==
"It Ain't My Fault" was the most-added single at Country radio for the week of January 18, 2017. It first entered the Billboard's Country Airplay on chart date of January 28, 2017 at No. 57, and Hot Country Songs at No. 47 two weeks later, later peaking at 14. The song has sold 356,000 copies in the US as of November 2017.

== Charts ==
Chart (2017)	Peak position
US Billboard Hot 100	79
US Country Airplay (Billboard)	12
US Hot Country Songs (Billboard)	14

=== Year-end charts ===
Chart (2017)	Position
Canada Country (Billboard)	10
US Country Airplay (Billboard)	43
US Hot Country Songs (Billboard)	23

== Certifications ==
Certifications for It Ain't My Fault
Region	Certification	Certified units/sales
United States (RIAA)	2× Platinum	2,000,000^{‡}
^{‡} Sales+streaming figures based on certification alone.
