= Adam Box =

American drummer

- Born: Meridian, Mississippi
- Genre: Country
- Occupation: Drummer
- Instrument: Drums
- Years active: 2010s-present

Adam Box is an American drummer, best known for his work with the country duo Brothers Osborne.

Box started playing drums at church in his hometown of Zero, Mississippi, in a church band that covered contemporary rock songs with Christian lyrics. He later entered a battle of the bands in Starkville, Mississippi and formed a band called Absence of Concern, which opened for Bob Seger at a concert in Jackson, Mississippi. Box later met Chris Ethridge, a bassist who had played in The Flying Burrito Brothers, through a mutual friend, and Ethridge served as Box's mentor.

Box is in the road band for the duo Brothers Osborne, and played on their debut album Pawn Shop.

He has also played on recordings by Chase Bryant and Kristy Lee Cook.
