= Brothers Osborne =

American country music duo

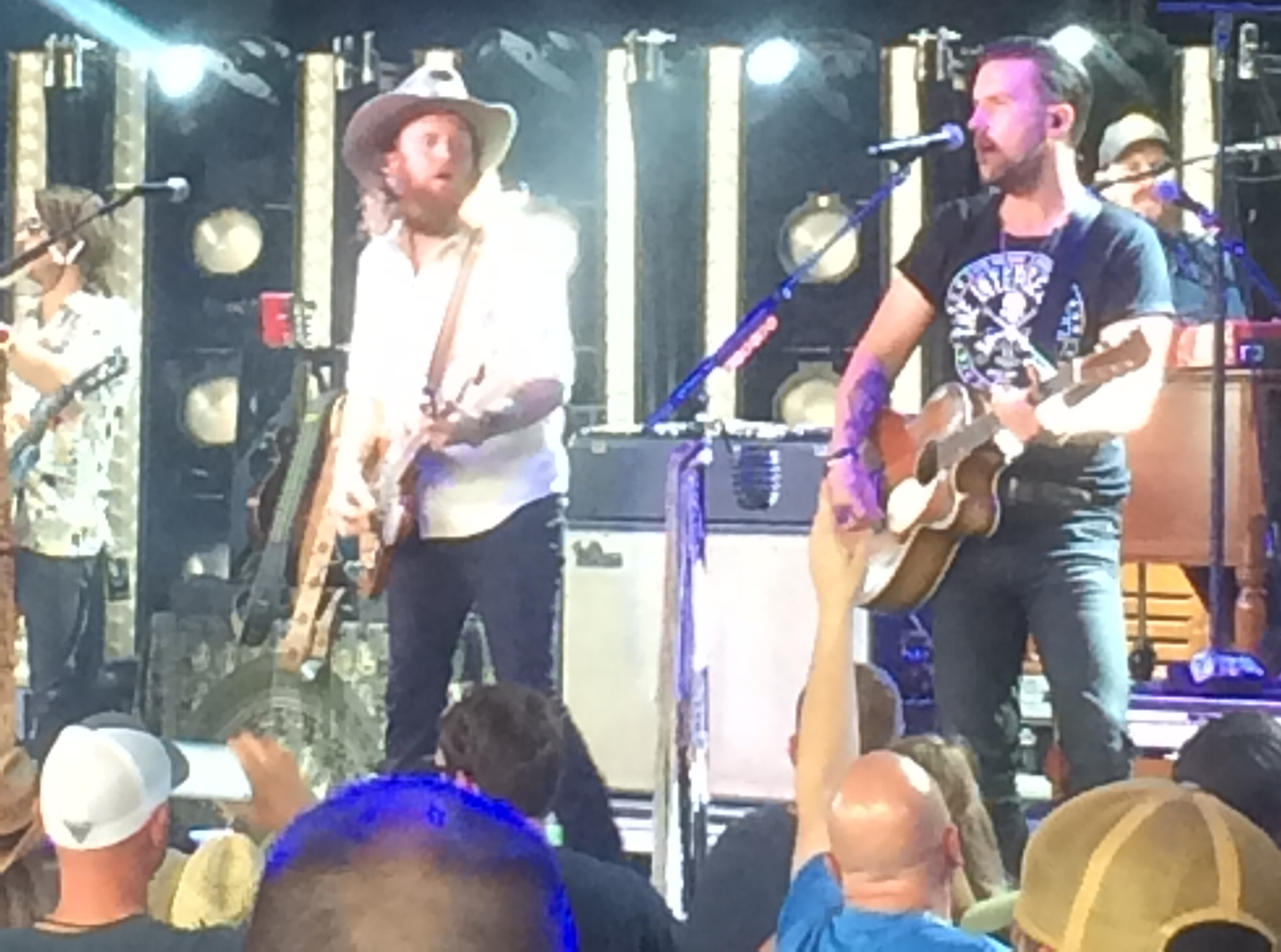
- John Osborne (left) and TJ Osborne (right) at DTE Energy Music Theatre, June 2018

Background information
- Origin: Deale, Maryland, U.S.
- Genres: Country rock; country
- Works: Brothers Osborne discography
- Years active: 2012–present
- Label: EMI Nashville
- Members: John Osborne; TJ Osborne

Brothers Osborne is an American country music duo from Deale, Maryland. The duo consists of brothers TJ Osborne (lead vocals, acoustic guitar) and John Osborne (lead guitar, background vocals). They signed a recording contract with EMI Records Nashville in 2012 and began releasing music the following year. Their 2015 song "Stay a Little Longer" became a top five hit on the Billboard Hot Country Songs and Country Airplay charts, and their success led to the release of their debut studio album titled Pawn Shop the same year. Since then, Brothers Osborne have released the albums Port Saint Joe (2018), Skeletons (2020), and Brothers Osborne (2023).

The duo have since had further hits with "It Ain't My Fault" (2017), "Shoot Me Straight" (2018), and "All Night" (2019), and as featured artists on Dierks Bentley's "Burning Man" (2019). Along with their own songwriting, their musical success is credited to producer Jay Joyce. Artists with whom they have worked include David Nail, Lee Ann Womack, and Lucie Silvas (the latter of whom is John's wife). Their musical style takes influence from Southern rock and outlaw country, with particular emphasis on the styles of TJ's lead vocals and John's guitar playing. The duo attracted further media attention in February 2021 when TJ came out as gay, making him the first openly gay artist on a major country music label.

Since the duo debut, they've been recognized with many prestigious accolades, which includes a Grammy Award, six Academy of Country Music Awards and five Country Music Association Awards. The American Society of Composers, Authors and Publishers honored them with the ASCAP Vanguard Award in 2019, and Billboard included the brothers in their list of the 100 Greatest Country Artists of All Time in 2024.

== History and formation ==
Brothers John Osborne (born 1982) and TJ Osborne (born 1984) were two of five children raised in Deale, Maryland, a rural fishing community located along the Chesapeake Bay. In addition to their parents, who both wrote and played music regularly, their uncles and cousins also pursued musical hobbies. The family often gathered to perform music, inspiring the brothers' earliest musical aspirations. "Naturally, John and I wanted to participate and play with the family because it was fun. And that was where we cut our teeth," said TJ Osborne in 2014. The brothers then started performing regularly with their father, John Osborne Sr. Together, they played in a band called Deuces and a Quarter, while also helping their father with his day job as a plumber. When not performing, the brothers practiced music in their family's backyard shed.

The duo continued performing more consistently through high school. They later represented their high school in the Anne Arundel County "Battle of the Bands" in 2000. Upon graduation, John attended Belmont University in Nashville, Tennessee. TJ soon followed his brother to the city after finishing high school. They first attempted to have separate careers. John began playing gigs as a sideman, while TJ played upright bass and composed material for other artists. TJ also made several demonstration records. Yet his own voice was considered "not generic enough" for many industry professionals. It was after this that the brothers started working together. For several years, the duo performed in clubs, bars, and other small music venues. In 2011, they signed a publishing contract with Warner-Chappell. In 2012, the siblings secured a recording contract with EMI Nashville, a subdivision of Capitol Records and Nashville's Universal Music Group.

== Career ==
=== 2013–2016: Career rise and Pawn Shop ===
In 2013, Brothers Osborne released their debut single titled "Let's Go There." The uptempo song became a minor hit, reaching the top 40 hit on the Billboard Hot Country Songs chart. Its limited radio success led their record label to hold off on releasing a full album. The song was followed in 2014 by the single "Rum." It reached a similar Billboard chart position, which continued to halt an official album release from EMI. Instead, the label released a self-titled extended play later that year. The EP reached the top 25 of the Billboard Top Country Albums list and contained five tracks (including their 2014 single). Following its release, several music journalists named the pair on new artists lists, such as "Best of What's Next" or "Ones to Watch." Hannah Smith of Vinyl magazine praised the project and anticipated future success for the pair: "Brothers Osborne is a duo who are redefining the lines and following in the footsteps of trailblazers who have launched a revolution with their distinct music."

Their third single "Stay a Little Longer" was issued in 2015. The song was originally included on their 2014 EP, but was re-recorded for the single release. "Stay a Little Longer" became the duo's first major hit, reaching the top five of the Billboard country chart. Its success led to the release of their first full-length album titled Pawn Shop (2016). The album contained material mostly penned by John and TJ Osborne. It also featured vocal collaborations with Lee Ann Womack. Pawn Shop peaked at number three on the Billboard country albums chart and number 17 on the Billboard 200. Pawn Shop received four stars from Allmusic's Stephen Thomas Erlewine who called it "busy, but never overstuffed." Andrew Unterberger of Spin commented that the album was "setting the bar for the genre in 2016." Two additional singles were spawned following the record's release that later became hits: "21 Summer" and "It Ain't My Fault." The commercial success led the brothers to win five industry awards. Both the Academy of Country Music and Country Music Association named them as Vocal Duo of the Year in both 2016 and 2017, with the latter association also awarding New Vocal Duo in 2016. Also in 2016, the brothers co-wrote and sang on the track "Good at Tonight" on David Nail's album Fighter. This song was also released as a single, charting at number 52 on Country Airplay late in the year.

=== 2018–2022: Port Saint Joe and Skeletons ===
In early 2018, the brothers announced the release of their second studio record titled Port Saint Joe. The album was named for the town of the same name, which was also where the duo recorded it. Its lead single was the song "Shoot Me Straight". It later reached the top 30 of the Billboard country songs chart. Port Saint Joe was officially released in April 2018 via EMI Nashville. Like its predecessor, Port Saint Joe was produced by Jay Joyce. It peaked at number two on the Billboard country albums list and number 15 on the Billboard 200. Joseph Hudak of Rolling Stone described the record as "a concise, 10-song effort." Allmusic's Stephen Thomas Erlewine called it a "clever, smart, adventurous, and hooky, creating a slow-rolling good-time vibe that doesn't lose its luster with repeated plays."

Between 2018 and 2019, the brothers were part of several collaborative projects. In mid-2018, they were featured on Dierks Bentley's "Burning Man", a single from his studio album The Mountain. The song became their biggest hit since "Stay a Little Longer", climbing to the top five of the Billboard country songs chart. In 2019, the duo collaborated with Maren Morris on a duet for her studio album Girl. They also joined Brooks & Dunn on their 2019 album Reboot, where they contributed to a re-recording of that duo's 1993 hit "Hard Workin' Man". Brothers Osborne were later nominated by the Country Music Association for their recent collaborative projects. In spring of 2019 The Brothers Osborne were featured guests on the PBS concert series Bluegrass Underground (now re-branded as The Caverns Sessions).

In October 2019, they released a live album recorded during three concerts at the Ryman Auditorium in Nashville. This was followed in July 2020 by the announcement of a third studio album, titled Skeletons, which later was later released in October 2020. Also produced by Jay Joyce, the album included songs written by the brothers, with several Nashville songwriters. Skeletons debuted in the top five of the country albums chart and the top 50 on the Billboard 200. The album's first charted single is "All Night." Skeletons received a favorable response from Allmusic's Stephen Thomas Erlewine, who rated the project four and half stars. Erlewine praised the duo's mixing of different styles and recognized that the brothers had become "comfortable in the skin." Erlewine concluded by saying, "...the great thing about Skeletons is how it sounds like they're appealing to wide quadrants of rock, pop, country, and Americana audiences without sounding like anything but themselves." Jonathan Bernstein of Rolling Stone rated Skeletons at three and a half stars. Bernstein commented that the record is "a remarkably engaging country-leaning rock record that shows off what the duo does best."

At the end of 2021, the duo announced that they would be re-releasing Skeletons in 2022 with three additional songs. The first of these is "Younger Me", a song released as a promotional single earlier in 2021. This song was also nominated that year for Grammy Award for Best Country Duo/Group Performance. Also included are "Headstone" and "Midnight Rider's Prayer", the latter of which incorporates elements of Willie Nelson's "On the Road Again". In November 2022, Brothers Osborne and The War and Treaty covered The Rolling Stones' "It's Only Rock 'n Roll (But I Like It)" on the Country Music Association awards. Brothers Osborne provided backing vocals to Ashley McBryde's 2022 album Lindeville, on which John also served as producer.

=== 2023–present: Brothers Osborne and Break Mine ===
The duo released three new songs in March 2023: "Nobody's Nobody", "Might as Well Be Me", and "Roller Coaster (Forever and a Day)". The first of these was sent to radio as a single that same month, debuting at number 37 on Country Airplay. On July 14, 2023, the brothers released the song "Sun Ain't Even Gone Down Yet" and announced that their upcoming self-titled fourth album would be released on September 15, 2023. Unlike their previous albums, Brothers Osborne was produced by Mike Elizondo.

On February 29, 2024, the duo announced that their second EP Break Mine will be released on March 22, 2024. John Osborne re-teamed with Ashley McBryde to produce her fifth studio album Wild, which was released on May 8, 2026. On August 25, 2026, Brothers Osborne announced their fifth studio album, Watertown, would be released on October 23.

== Musical stylings ==
John Osborne is the main instrumentalist of the group, playing primarily electric guitar, while TJ is the lead vocalist. Of their sound, Spin writer Andrew Unterberger said, "John's guitar slides a Hattori Hanzō sharpness, while TJ’s vocals are wisely kept from going too thick with warbling vibrato, allowing them an understated vulnerability badly lacking in Nashville these days." Stephen Thomas Erlewine contrasted the duo with Sam Hunt and Chris Stapleton, saying that they have "the modern rhythmic snap of the former and the classicist structure of the latter." Allmusic describes the duo as recording "earthy, passionate country-rock", while Country Standard Time reviewer Jeffrey B. Remz noted influences of outlaw country and Southern rock in Pawn Shop. He also compared TJ's "sonorous, ultra-deep voice" favorably to Trace Adkins and noting the variety of guitar styles played by John as "sometimes steely, sometimes twangy, sometimes rocking".

When asked to name the ten albums that were the biggest influences on his musical life, John Osborne selected releases by Darrell Scott, Patty Loveless, Lucinda Williams, Merle Haggard, Willie Nelson, Alan Jackson, Dwight Yoakam, The Chicks, Alison Krauss & Union Station, and Lee Ann Womack.

== Personal lives ==
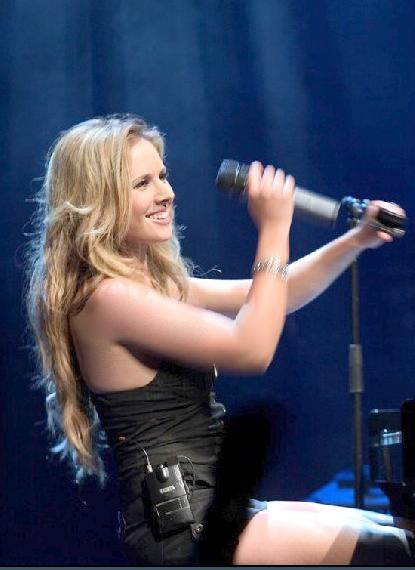
John Osborne has been married to Lucie Silvas since 2015.

John Osborne is married to British singer-songwriter Lucie Silvas. The two met in 2007 during a songwriting session, and married in 2015. That same year, John played guitar on and co-produced Silvas' studio album Letters to Ghosts. The couple became parents to boy-and-girl twins in March 2023.

On February 3, 2021, TJ came out as gay, making him the first openly gay artist signed to a major country music label. The duo's song "Younger Me" was directly inspired by TJ's attempts to come out earlier in his life.

In 2019, Brothers Osborne canceled a number of tours due to then-undisclosed reasons. In 2021, the duo revealed that this was due to John suffering from anxiety disorder and clinical depression. These factors caused tinnitus and caused him to cancel several recording sessions for Skeletons, and John later stated he considered quitting music entirely as a result. A year later, John stated that he was undergoing therapy and medication to treat the disorder.

== Band members ==
Current

- TJ Osborne (born November 18, 1984) – lead vocals, rhythm guitar
- John Osborne (born April 27, 1982) – lead guitar, backing vocals

Touring

- Adam Box – drums, percussion
- Jason Graumlich – electric guitar, acoustic guitar, mandolin, backing vocals
- Billy Justineau (former) - keyboards
- Pete Sternberg – bass guitar
- Dane Farnsworth - keyboards, organ
- Preston Wait - acoustic guitar, fiddle, steel guitar

== Discography ==
Studio albums

- Pawn Shop (2016)
- Port Saint Joe (2018)
- Skeletons (2020)
- Brothers Osborne (2023)
- Watertown (2026)

== Television appearances ==
Year	Title	Role	Notes
2024	RuPaul's Drag Race: All Stars	Themselves/Guest Judges	Episode: "Smokin' Hot Firefighter Makeovers"

== Awards and nominations ==
Brothers Osborne have received six awards from the Academy of Country Music, five awards from the Country Music Association and twelve nominations and one award from the Grammy Awards. Their sole Grammy Award was the Best Country Duo/Group Performance award in 2022.
