= 21 Summer =

Single by Brothers Osborne

from the album Pawn Shop
- Released: February 29, 2016
- Genre: Country
- Length: 3:35
- Label: EMI Nashville
- Songwriters: John Osborne; T. J. Osborne; Craig Wiseman
- Producer: Jay Joyce

Brothers Osborne singles chronology
"Stay a Little Longer" (2015)	"21 Summer" (2016)	"Good at Tonight" (2016)

"21 Summer" is a song recorded by American country music duo Brothers Osborne. The song was released in February 2016 as the duo's fourth single overall and the third from the album Pawn Shop. Duo members John and T.J. Osborne co-wrote the song with Craig Wiseman.

== Content ==
The song is a nostalgic song recalling a former love that the narrator had in the summertime. John Osborne said, "It’s about looking back on a time in your life, regardless of how a previous relationship went. Whatever went wrong seemed to drift away and you only remember the glow of it, and the beauty of it and the importance of it."

The brothers originally cut a demo of the song featuring a vocal hook. When recording the full version of the song with producer Jay Joyce, the hook was played on John's guitar and echoed by the brothers' sister, Natalie, along with bassist Pete Sternberg and Lucie Silvas, who is John Osborne's wife. Drummer Adam Box plays a muted snare drum with a mallet. The brothers said that they wanted the song to have a vibe similar to a Jackson Browne song.

After coming out as gay in February 2021, T.J. Osborne revealed that "21 Summer" was written about his first heartbreak when his relationship ended with a man he was dating in secret and he was unable to talk about it with anyone. Speaking to Time, he explained “I was mad that no one knew why I was hurting. There are so many times I’ve sung that song and wanted to cry. People love that song, but the emotion of it is deeper than they even realize.”

== Commercial performance ==
The song peaked at No. 25 on the Hot Country Songs chart and No. 24 on Country Airplay. It has sold 138,000 copies in the United States as of November 2016.

== Music video ==
The music video was directed by Justin Clough and premiered in August 2016, starring Stirling Everly, the grandson of Don Everly of The Everly Brothers.

== Chart performance ==
=== Weekly charts ===
Chart (2016)	Peak position
Canada Country (Billboard)	35
US Bubbling Under Hot 100 (Billboard)	23
US Country Airplay (Billboard)	24
US Hot Country Songs (Billboard)	25

=== Year-end charts ===
Chart (2016)	Position
US Hot Country Songs (Billboard)	66

== Certifications ==
Region	Certification	Certified units/sales
United States (RIAA)	Gold	500,000^{‡}
^{‡} Sales+streaming figures based on certification alone.
