= Stay a Little Longer (Brothers Osborne song) =

Single by Brothers Osborne

from the album Pawn Shop
- Released: March 10, 2015
- Genre: Country
- Length: 4:16 (EP version); 5:35 (Pawn Shop version); 3:49 (Radio Version)
- Label: EMI Nashville
- Songwriter(s): John Osborne; T. J. Osborne; Shane McAnally
- Producer(s): Jay Joyce

Brothers Osborne singles chronology
"Rum" (2014)	"Stay a Little Longer" (2015)	"21 Summer" (2016)

"Stay a Little Longer" is a song recorded by American country music duo Brothers Osborne. The song was released in March 2015 as the duo's third single overall and the second from the album Pawn Shop. Duo members John and T.J. Osborne co-wrote the song with Shane McAnally. The song was nominated for the Grammy Award for Best Country Duo/Group Performance at the 58th Annual Grammy Awards.

== Content ==
The song is a guitar-driven mid-tempo about a man who has an encounter with an "on again, off again" lover and, after the encounter, wishes that they could "stay a little longer." T.J. Osborne, one half of the duo, told Rolling Stone that "That song gives them everything that we are. It starts off and the verses are really emotional and fragile. You don't want to be alone, you're making the phone call, taking the trip to the house and then you're tearing t-shirts off and it's this electric thing," T.J. says. "But then, boom, you're by yourself again: 'I'm lying here wishing you could stay a little longer.'" The duo previously recorded the song on their 2014 self-titled extended play, but re-recorded it for the single version with Jay Joyce as producer.

The song is recorded in the key of F-sharp major with a main chord pattern of F♯-D♯m-B.

== Reception ==
=== Critical ===
Billy Dukes of Taste of Country reviewed the song with favor, saying that it "demands repeat listens just to decipher everything that’s happening within the blues-rocked soaked country cut. TJ Osborne’s slow storytelling runs counter to the arrangement and John Osborne’s guitar playing, as if mirroring what the guy he’s singing about is doing and feeling." Bob Paxman of Nash Country Weekly gave the song an "A", comparing its theme to "I'm Not in Love" by 10cc and saying that "It’s a theme that’s been explored before, but not in such straightforward yet expressive language."

=== Commercial ===
The song first entered the Country Airplay chart at No. 49 for chart dated April 18, 2015. The following week, it entered the Hot Country Songs chart at No. 48. It entered the Bubbling Under Hot 100 chart at No. 12 on the chart date of August 1, 2015, and the Hot 100 at No. 99 on October 24, 2015. The song peaked at No. 4 on Hot Country Songs for chart dated January 30, 2016, and No. 46 on Hot 100 a week later. To date, it is their only top 10 hit on both the Country Airplay and Hot Country Songs charts. The song was certified Gold by the RIAA on December 7, 2015. It has sold 607,000 copies in the US as of November 2016.

== Music video ==
The music video was directed by Peter Zavadil and premiered in October 2015. The video received controversy due to the fact that it included real life same-sex couples kissing. Band member TJ Osbourne said of the video, "We didn’t want it to be about one person or one couple...[w]e wanted to nail down the narrative that it’s really about something that we’ve all felt and been through."

== Chart performance ==
=== Weekly charts ===
Chart (2015–2016)	Peak position
Canada (Canadian Hot 100)	68
Canada Country (Billboard)	26
US Billboard Hot 100	46
US Country Airplay (Billboard)	2
US Hot Country Songs (Billboard)	4

=== Year-end charts ===
Chart (2015)	Position
US Country Airplay (Billboard)	59
US Hot Country Songs (Billboard)	54

Chart (2016)	Position
US Country Airplay (Billboard)	42
US Hot Country Songs (Billboard)	52

== Certifications ==
Region	Certification	Certified units/sales
Canada (Music Canada)	Gold	40,000^{*}
United States (RIAA)	3× Platinum	607,000
^{*} Sales figures based on certification alone.
