= Shoot Me Straight =

Single by Brothers Osborne

from the album Port Saint Joe
- Released: January 16, 2018
- Genre: Country rock, southern rock
- Length: 6:24 (album version); 3:27 (radio edit)
- Label: EMI Nashville
- Songwriters: John Osborne; T.J. Osborne; Lee Thomas Miller
- Producer: Jay Joyce

Brothers Osborne singles chronology
"It Ain't My Fault" (2017)	"Shoot Me Straight" (2018)	"Burning Man" (2018)

"Shoot Me Straight" is a song recorded by American country music duo Brothers Osborne. Both members of the duo, John Osborne and T.J. Osborne, wrote it with Lee Thomas Miller. It is the duo's sixth solo single, and the first from their second album, Port Saint Joe. The song was used in the S.W.A.T. episode, "Track", as well as the 9-1-1: Lone Star pilot episode.

== Content ==
Carena Liptak of The Boot said of the song, "TJ Osborne opens the song with an uptempo, brooding ode to alcohol and making bad decisions. Around the two-and-a-half-minute mark, the vocals fade out, and John Osborne's impressive guitarwork takes the spotlight." T.J. Osborne said that the song was initially conceived as a ballad until John presented a musical riff that the two decided to incorporate. They then finished the song in a beach house in Florida. T.J. also said that he knew that the song would be "risky" for radio given its extreme length.

== Music video ==
Directed by Wes Edwards and Ryan Silver, the song's music video debuted in August 2018. The music video features the duo performing "against their will" in open fields, near trucks and attractive women, in a parody of bro-country videos. The video also makes references to Bowfinger and Weekend at Bernie's. John said that the idea came about due to the duo's inability to come up with a video idea that they liked, until they decided to "make a video about...not making a video."

== Chart performance ==
=== Weekly charts ===
Chart (2018)	Peak position
US Country Airplay (Billboard)	28
US Hot Country Songs (Billboard)	29

=== Year-end charts ===
Chart (2018)	Position
US Hot Country Songs (Billboard)	75

== Certifications ==
Certifications for Shoot Me Straight
Region	Certification	Certified units/sales
United States (RIAA)	Gold	500,000^{‡}
^{‡} Sales+streaming figures based on certification alone.
