= C2C: Country to Country =

European annual country music festival

- Genre: Country (Rock, Pop), Americana
- Dates: 16–17 March 2013; 14–16 March 2014; 7–8 March 2015; 11–13 March 2016; 10–12 March 2017; 9–11 March 2018; 8–10 March 2019; 11–13 March 2022; 10–12 March 2023; 8–10 March 2024; 14–16 March 2025; 13–15 March 2026; 12–14 March 2027
- Locations: London; Dublin; Glasgow; Oslo; Stockholm; Amsterdam; Berlin; Sydney; Brisbane; Rotterdam; Belfast; Manchester
- Years active: 2013–2019, 2022-present
- Capacity: 25,000
- Website: c2c-countrytocountry.com

C2C: Country to Country is a country music festival that has been held in Europe every year since 2013. It was first held in London on 16–17 March 2013. The festival was the first multi-day country music event in the United Kingdom, since the demise of the popular International Festival of Country Music, which was held at Wembley Arena and hosted by Mervyn Conn. The event was jointly developed by the O2 Arena and SJM Concerts, collaborating with the Country Music Association. In 2019 it had a capacity of 25,000.

In 2013, it was announced that the festival would come to the 3Arena in Dublin on 14–15 March 2014.

The festival expanded even more into Europe, adding additional dates in Sweden and Norway in 2015, and the Netherlands, Germany and Australia in 2019.

As of the 2015 festival, pop-up radio station BBC Radio 2 Country was set up and runs over 4 days, including a live broadcast of the main stage performances.

Since 2016, the festival has run over three nights.

In 2018, Milly Olykan received the Jo Walker-Meador International Award from the Country Music Association for her role in helping AEG concerts develop C2C. The award recognizes outstanding achievement by an individual in advocating and supporting country music's marketing development in territories outside the United States.

== Venues ==
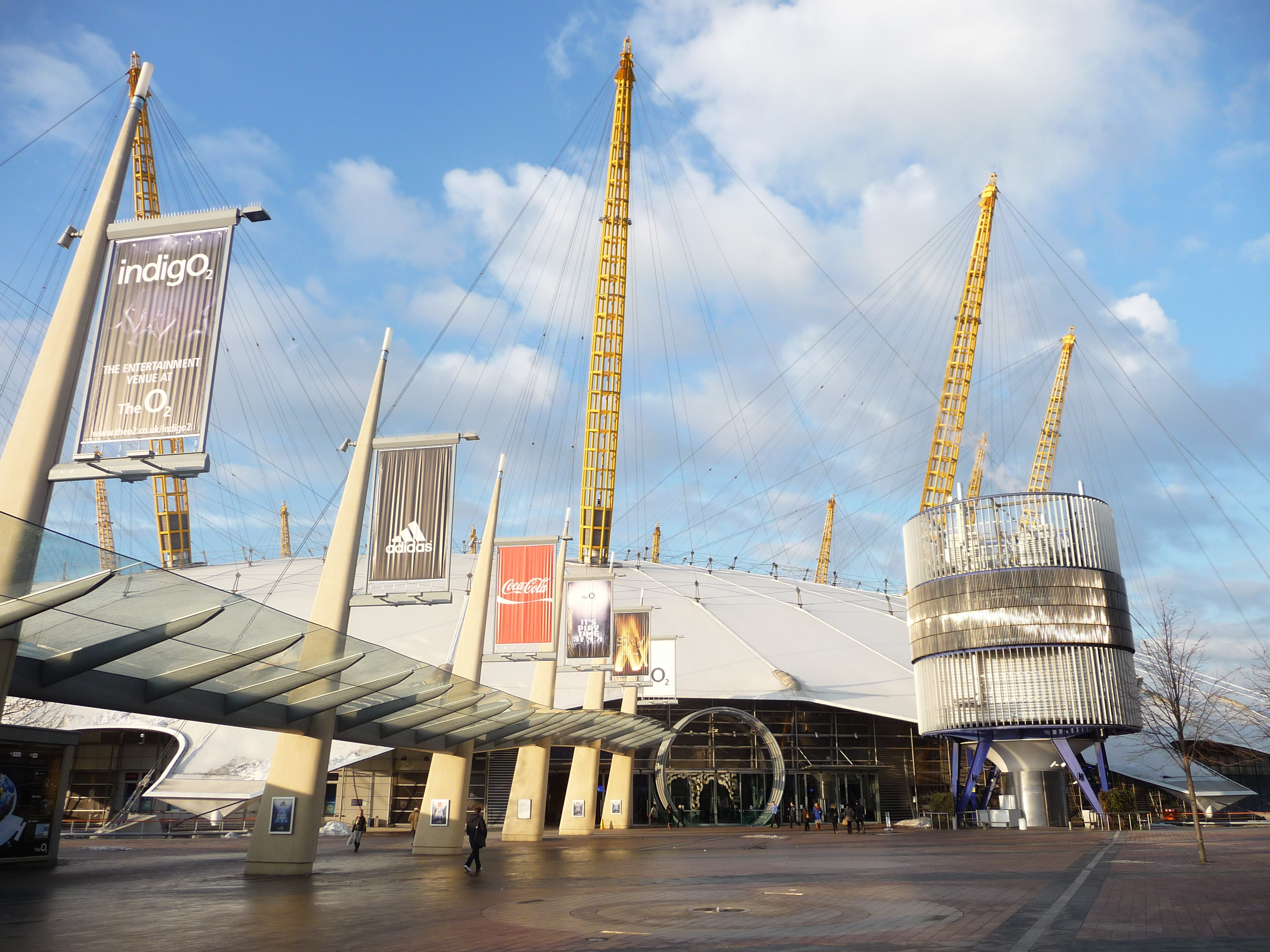
The festival has been held at the O2 Arena since its inception.

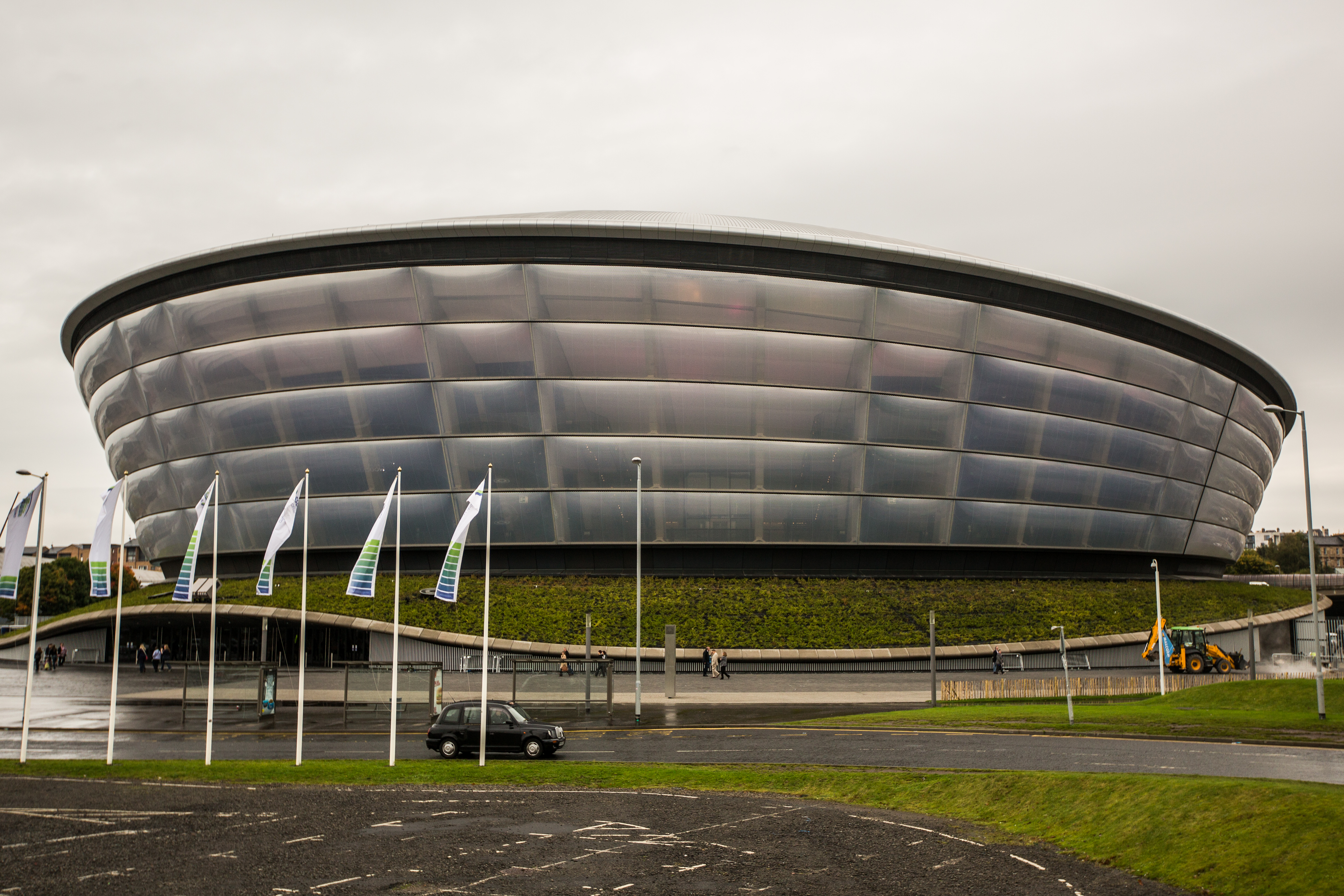
C2C was upgraded to the SSE Hydro because of its larger capacity.

Venue	City/Country	Years
O2 Arena	London, England	2013–present
3Arena	Dublin, Ireland	2014–2023
OVO Hydro	Glasgow, Scotland	2018–present
SEC Armadillo	Glasgow, Scotland	2016–2017
Spektrum	Oslo, Norway	2015–2016
The Globe	Stockholm, Sweden	2015
Hovet	Stockholm, Sweden	2016
AFAS Live	Amsterdam, Netherlands	2019–2020
Verti Music Hall	Berlin, Germany	2019–2020, 2024–present
Sydney SuperDome	Sydney, Australia	2019
Brisbane Entertainment Centre	Brisbane, Australia	2019
Rotterdam Ahoy	Rotterdam, Netherlands	2024–present
SSE Arena	Belfast, Northern Ireland	2024–2026
AO Arena	Manchester, England	2027

== Festival facts ==
- From the inaugural event to the 2026 edition, the festival has been hosted in London by BBC Radio 2 presenter Bob Harris. He was joined by co-host Breland in 2023, Alana Springsteen in 2024, Mickey Guyton in 2025, and Jackson Dean in 2026.
- Carrie Underwood was the first act to headline the festival twice (2013 & 2016).
- Little Big Town are the first act to play the festival three times. After appearing at the inaugural 2013 event, they returned in 2016 and headlined in 2018. They were followed by Darius Rucker and Kip Moore, who both appeared for the third time in 2022. Lady A and Zac Brown Band marked their third appearances in 2023, with Brad Paisley headlining for the third time in 2024. Ashley McBryde and Midland both performed for the third time in 2027.
- Other acts that have played the main stage over multiple years are Brantley Gilbert, Kip Moore, Chris Young, Kristian Bush, Jennifer Nettles, Kacey Musgraves, Chris Stapleton, Cam, Hunter Hayes, Luke Combs, Thomas Rhett, Carly Pearce, Priscilla Block, Brian Kelley, Brothers Osborne, Old Dominion, Dierks Bentley, Tyler Hubbard, Lainey Wilson, Keith Urban, Tyler Braden, Scotty McCreery, Russell Dickerson, and Drake Milligan.
- Jennifer Nettles was the first artist to play the main stage in consecutive years, appearing as a solo performer in 2017 and as part of Sugarland in 2018.
- Sam Hunt, Maren Morris, Drake White, McBryde, Old Dominion, Breland, Matt Stell, Lindsay Ell, Milligan, Avery Anna, Bayker Blankenship, Kashus Culpepper, and Emily Ann Roberts have been upgraded from their initial appearances on the spotlight stage to the main stage in subsequent years.
- In 2019, Catherine McGrath became the first UK country artist to perform on the main stage when she joined Hunter Hayes in London for their duet of "Don't Let Me Forget".
- Ty Myers is the youngest artist to perform on the main stage. He was eighteen years old when he played in 2026.
- The festival has hosted four members of the Country Music Hall of Fame: Vince Gill, Reba McEntire, Emmylou Harris, and Brooks & Dunn (as well as future member Marty Stuart), and twenty members of the Grand Ole Opry: Lauren Alaina, Luke Combs, Bentley, Gill, Harris, Jelly Roll, Lady A, Little Big Town, Martina McBride, McCreery, McEntire, Old Crow Medicine Show, Paisley, Carly Pearce, Rascal Flatts, Dustin Lynch, Rucker, Stuart, Underwood, Urban, and Wilson.

== C2C: Country to Country 2013 ==
The first C2C: Country to Country festival was announced in late November 2012, and was held on 16–17 March 2013 at the O2 Arena in London. Tim McGraw and Carrie Underwood headlined the first and second nights respectively.

16 March	17 March
**Tim McGraw**; Vince Gill; Little Big Town; Kristian Bush	**Carrie Underwood**; Darius Rucker; LeAnn Rimes; Brantley Gilbert

Headline acts in bold

Main Stage Set Lists
Kristian Bush Set List
- 1. American Window
- 2. Love or Money
- 3. Make Another Memory
- 4. Baby Girl
- 5. You're Gonna Get Yours
- 6. Atlantic City
- 7. Shine On
Little Big Town Set List
- 1. Pavement Ends
- 2. Little White Church
- 3. Bring It On Home
- 4. Sober
- 5. Fine Line
- 6. Front Porch Thing
- 7. Your Side of the Bed
- 8. Leavin' In Your Eyes
- 9. The Chain
- 10. Can't Go Back
- 11. Born This Way
- 12. Pontoon
- 13. Tornado
- 14. Boondocks
Vince Gill Set List
- 1. One More Last Chance
- 2. Never Alone
- 3. What the Cowgirls Do
- 4. Take Your Memory with You
- 5. Look at Us
- 6. When I Call Your Name
- 7. High Lonesome Sound
- 8. I Still Believe in You
- 9. Guitar Slinger
- 10. Pretty Little Adriana
- 11. Go Rest High on That Mountain
- 12. Don't Let Our Love Start Slippin' Away
- 13. Oklahoma Borderline
- 14. Whenever You Come Around
- 15. Liza Jane
Tim McGraw Set List
- 1. Felt Good on My Lips
- 2. For a Little While
- 3. Down on the Farm
- 4. Unbroken
- 5. Where the Green Grass Grows
- 6. Nashville Without You
- 7. One of Those Nights
- 8. Everywhere
- 9. Mexicoma
- 10. All I Want Is a Life
- 11. Just to See You Smile
- 12. Friend of a Friend
- 13. Let It Go
- 14. The Cowboy in Me
- 15. How Bad Do You Want It
- 16. Something Like That
- 17. Real Good Man
- 18. Live Like You Were Dying
- 19. I Like It, I Love It
- 20. Two Lanes of Freedom
- 21. Truck Yeah
Brantley Gilbert Set List
- 1. Dirt Road Anthem
- 2. My Kinda Party
- 3. Read Me My Rights
- 4. You Don't Know Her Like I Do
- 5. Country Must Be Country Wide
- 6. Kick It in the Sticks
LeAnn Rimes Set List
- 1. Nothin' Better to Do
- 2. Swingin'
- 3. Life Goes On
- 4. I Need You
- 5. Last Thing on My Mind
- 6. Spitfire
- 7. One Way Ticket
- 8. Nothin' 'bout Love Makes Sense
- 9. Commitment (song)
- 10. Borrowed
- 11. Blue
- 12. Can't Fight the Moonlight
- 13. How Do I Live
- 14. Summertime
- 15. Amazing Grace
Darius Rucker Set List
- 1. Love Will Do That
- 2. Alright
- 3. True Believers
- 4. Don't Think I Don't Think About It
- 5. Only Wanna Be with You
- 6. Radio
- 7. The Joker
- 8. Come Back Song
- 9. Let Her Cry
- 10. It Won't Be Like This for Long
- 11. This
- 12. Family
- 13. All I Want
- 14. Southern State of Mind
- 15. Hold On
- 16. Wagon Wheel
- 17. Purple Rain
Carrie Underwood Set List
1. Good Girl
2. Undo It
3. Wasted
4. Quitter
5. I Told You So
6. Two Black Cadillacs
7. Some Hearts
8. Last Name
9. Temporary Home
10. Jesus, Take the Wheel / How Great Thou Art
11. Cowboy Casanova
12. All-American Girl
13. Nobody Ever Told You
14. One Way Ticket
15. Leave Love Alone
16. So Small
17. Flat on the Floor
18. Cupid's Got a Shotgun
19. Before He Cheats
20. I Know You Won't
21. Blown Away

=== London pop-up stages ===
- Ags Connolly
- Alan West
- Dean Owens
- James Riley
- Jill Johnson
- Raevennan Husbandes
- Raintown
- Robert Vincent
- The Good Intentions
- The Robbie Boyd Band

== C2C: Country to Country 2014 ==
The second C2C: Country to Country festival was held on 15–16 March 2014 at the O2 Arena in London, and on 14–15 March 2014 at The 3Arena in Dublin; aside from Martina McBride, who only played the London show. The Zac Brown Band and Brad Paisley headlined the two nights.

Dublin – 14 March London – 15 March	Dublin – 15 March London – 16 March
**Zac Brown Band**; Dixie Chicks; Dierks Bentley; Martina McBride (London only)	**Brad Paisley**; Rascal Flatts; Chris Young; The Band Perry

Headline acts in bold

Main Stage Set Lists
Martina McBride Set List
- 1. My Baby Loves Me
- 2. Wild Angels
- 3. Concrete Angel
- 4. Suspicious Minds
- 5. Little Bit of Rain
- 6. Anyway
- 7. Whatever You Say
- 8. A Broken Wing
- 9. Love's the Only House
- 10. This One's for the Girls
- 11. Independence Day
Dierks Bentley Set List
- 1. Am I the Only One
- 2. Free and Easy (Down the Road I Go)
- 3. 5-1-5-0
- 4. Every Mile a Memory
- 5. Lot of Leavin' Left to Do
- 6. Riser
- 7. Tip It On Back
- 8. Up on the Ridge
- 9. Wish You Were Here
- 10. Hey Brother
- 11. I Hold On
- 12. What Was I Thinkin'
- 13. Sideways
- 14. Home
Dixie Chicks Set List
- 1. The Long Way Around
- 2. Truth#2
- 3. Landslide
- 4. Goodbye Earl
- 5. Sin Wagon
- 6. Cowboy Take Me Away
- 7. Wrecking Ball
- 8. Lubbock or Leave It
- 9. Ready to Run
- 10. Wide Open Spaces
- 11. Not Ready to Make Nice
- 12. Mississippi
Zac Brown Band Set List
- 1. Whiskey's Gone
- 2. Keep Me in Mind
- 3. Jump Right In
- 4. The Wind
- 5. As She's Walking Away
- 6. Island Song
- 7. Free / Into the Mystic
- 8. Enter Sandman
- 9. All Alright
- 10. Who Knows
- 11. Knee Deep
- 12. Colder Weather
- 13. Day For The Dead
- 14. Let It Rain
- 15. Goodbye in Her Eyes
- 16. Natural Disaster
- 17. Toes
- 18. Chicken Fried
- 19. Uncaged
- 20. Kashmir
- 21. The Devil Went Down to Georgia
The Band Perry Set List
- 1. Done
- 2. Night Gone Wasted
- 3. You Lie
- 4. All Your Life
- 5. I'm A Keeper
- 6. Fat Bottomed Girls
- 7. Pioneer
- 8. Timber
- 9. Chainsaw
- 10. If I Die Young
- 11. Better Dig Two
Chris Young Set List
- 1. A.M.
- 2. Gettin' You Home
- 3.Voices
- 4. Lonely Eyes
- 5. Who I Am with You
- 6. Aw Naw
- 7. Sharp Dressed Man
- 8. I Can Take It from There
- 9. You
- 10. Tomorrow
Rascal Flatts Set List
- 1. Banjo
- 2. Fast Cars and Freedom
- 3. Here's To You
- 4. Love You Out Loud
- 5. These Days
- 6. Rewind
- 7. Why Wait (song)
- 8. Bless the Broken Road
- 9. Me and My Gang
- 10. Stand
- 11. What Hurts the Most
- 12. Summer Nights
- 13. Life Is a Highway
Brad Paisley Set List
- 1. Southern Comfort Zone
- 2. American Saturday Night
- 3. Outstanding in Our Field
- 4. This Is Country Music
- 5. Then
- 6. She's Everything
- 7. Hot for Teacher
- 8. Old Alabama
- 9. Online
- 10. I'm Still a Guy
- 11. Mud on the Tires
- 12. I'm Gonna Miss Her
- 13. Whiskey Lullaby
- 14. Ticks
- 15. Water
- 16. The Mona Lisa
- 17. Alcohol

=== London pop-up stages ===
- Alan West
- Amelia Curran
- Ann Doka
- Carolynne Poole
- Dexeter
- Dirty Beggars
- Emma Jade
- Frankie Davies
- Gary Quinn
- Hannah Jane Lewis
- Hometown Show
- Jessica Clemmons
- Jill & Kate
- Lisa Marie Fischer
- Lisa Redford
- Luke & Mel
- Maria Byrne
- Tim McKay
- Raintown
- Star Lane
- Stephen Kellogg
- Stevie Agnew
- Striking Matches
- The Diablos
- The Shires
- The Sonny Walters Band
- Thorne Hill
- Tom Wright
- Ward Thomas

== C2C: Country to Country 2015 ==
The third C2C: Country to Country festival was held on 7–8 March 2015 at the O2 Arena in London and The 3Arena in Dublin. Extra dates were held in Stockholm and Oslo from 28 February to 1 March 2015 with very similar line-ups. Luke Bryan and Lady Antebellum headlined the two nights. Two events under the C2C banner were also held in Glasgow at the SEC Armadillo. Bryan, Florida Georgia Line and Lindsay Ell played the venue on 3 March, while Lady Antebellum, Kip Moore and Brandy Clark performed on 5 March.

The CMA Songwriters Series took place on 6 March and starred Kix Brooks, Brandy Clark, Jessi Alexander, Jon Randall and Sam Palladio.

Stockholm – 28 February Oslo – 1 March London – 7 March Dublin – 8 March	Oslo – 28 February Stockholm – 1 March Dublin – 7 March London – 8 March
**Luke Bryan**; Florida Georgia Line; Lee Ann Womack; Brandy Clark (London & Dublin); Doug Seegers (Stockholm & Oslo)	**Lady Antebellum**; Jason Aldean; Brantley Gilbert; Kip Moore
London Satellite Stage
Sam Hunt; Sam Palladio	The Shires; Ward Thomas

Headline acts in bold

Main Stage Set Lists
Brandy Clark Set List
- 1. Stripes
- 2. Big Day In A Small Town
- 3. What'll Keep Me Out Of Heaven
- 4. Broke
- 5. Better Dig Two
- 6. Mama's Broken Heart
- 7. Hold My Hand
- 8. Get High
- 9. Crazy Women
- 10. You Can Come Over
- 11. Take A Little Pill
- 12. Hungover
Lee Ann Womack Set List
- 1. All His Saints
- 2. Never Again, Again
- 3. Twenty Years and Two Husbands Ago
- 4. Don't Listen To The Wind
- 5. A Little Past Little Rock
- 6. You've Got to Talk to Me
- 7. Send It On Down
- 8. Solitary Thinkin'
- 9. I'll Think of a Reason Later
- 10. Wayfaring Stranger
- 11. I May Hate Myself in the Morning
- 12. The Way I'm Livin'
- 13. I Hope You Dance
- 14. Ashes by Now
Florida Georgia Line Set List
- 1. Every Night
- 2. It'z Just What We Do
- 3. Round Here
- 4. Anything Goes
- 5. Get Your Shine On
- 6. Bumpin' The Night
- 7. Sippin' on Fire
- 8. Dirt
- 9. Like You Ain't Even Gone
- 10. Stay
- 11. Party People
- 12. This Is How We Roll
- 13. Sun Daze
- 14. Cruise
Luke Bryan Set List
- 1. That's My Kind of Night
- 2. All My Friends Say
- 3. Rain Is a Good Thing
- 4. Kiss Tomorrow Goodbye
- 5. Roller Coaster
- 6. Play It Again
- 7. Someone Else Calling You Baby
- 8. Shut It Down
- 9. Easy
- 10. Do I
- 11. Crash My Party
- 12. Drink a Beer
- 13. Drunk on You
- 14. I Don't Want This Night to End
- 16. I See You
- 17. Country Girl (Shake It for Me)
Kip Moore Set List
- 1. Wild Ones
- 2. Crazy One More Time
- 3. Reckless (Still Growin' Up)
- 4. Drive Me Crazy
- 5. Beer Money
- 6. Come & Get It
- 7. Hey Pretty Girl
- 8. Don't Look Back in Anger
- 9. Somethin' 'Bout a Truck
Brantley Gilbert Set List
- 1. Kick It in the Sticks
- 2. Hell on Wheels
- 3. If You Want A Bad Boy
- 4. You Don't Know Her Like I Do
- 5. My Baby's Guns 'N Roses
- 6. One Hell of an Amen
- 7. Bottoms Up
- 8. Take It Outside
- 9. Small Town Throwdown
- 10. Read Me My Rights
- 11. Country Must Be Country Wide
Jason Aldean Set List
- 1. Hicktown
- 2. My Kinda Party
- 3. Tattoos on This Town
- 4. Amarillo Sky
- 5. Tonight Looks Good on You
- 6. Sweet Little Somethin'
- 7. Take a Little Ride
- 8. Fly Over States
- 9. Two Night Town
- 10. Just Getting Started
- 11. When She Says Baby
- 12. Night Train
- 13. The Only Way I Know
- 14. Burnin' It Down
- 15. Crazy Town
- 16. Dirt Road Anthem
- 17. She's Country
Lady Antebellum Set List
1. Bartender
2. Long Stretch of Love
3. Our Kind of Love
4. Just a Kiss
5. Love Don't Live Here
6. Just A Girl
7. American Honey
8. Lie With Me
9. Compass
10. Lookin' for a Good Time
11. Islands in the Stream
12. One Great Mystery
13. Dancin' Away with My Heart / Wanted You More / Goodbye Town
14. Hello World
15. Downtown
16. I Run to You
17. We Owned the Night
18. Need You Now
19. Wake Me Up
20. Cups

=== London pop-up stages ===
- Acoustic Journey
- Angel Snow
- Ann Doka
- Aubrie Sellers
- Balsamo Deighton
- Callaghan
- Carolynne Poole
- Case Hardin
- Chloe Chadwick
- Claydon Connor
- David Bradley
- Dexeter
- Ellie Dibben
- Emma Jade
- Emma Swindells
- Fitzwallace
- Flats & Sharps
- Gary Quinn
- Goat Roper Rodeo Band
- Hannah Jane Lewis
- Holloway Road
- Hometown Show
- Honey Ryder
- InBlauK
- Jeannine Barry
- Jess and the Bandits
- Jess Roberts
- Jon Randall and Jessi Alexander
- Katie Armiger
- Katie Nicholas
- Kimmie Rhodes
- Laura Oakes
- Lewis & Leigh
- Lisa Redford
- Liv Austen
- Loud Mountains
- Lucy May
- Megan O'Neill
- Michele Stodart
- Miller's Daughter
- Mim Grey
- Paul Carella
- Pauper Kings
- Raintown
- Sam Hunt
- Sasha McVeigh
- Sonia Leigh
- Stephanie Manns
- Steve Young
- Striking Matches
- Talia Simone
- The Cains Trio
- The Dirty Beggars
- The James Clode Band
- The Rising
- The Shires
- The Tuesday Syndicate
- Ward Thomas
- Winter's Hill
- Woody Pines
- Worry Dolls

== C2C: Country to Country 2016 ==
The fourth C2C: Country to Country festival was held over three nights from 11 to 13 March 2016. Glasgow joined London and Dublin as the third venue. Carrie Underwood was the first headliner to be announced at all three venues, becoming the festival's first returning headliner following her appearance in 2013. The launch party was held at the Brooklyn Bowl inside the O2 Arena in London on 6 October 2015, the event was followed by a headlining Little Big Town concert. At the launch party it was announced that Miranda Lambert and Eric Church would join Carrie Underwood as the other headliners, although Miranda Lambert's involvement was leaked earlier that day by her own website, which also listed her three support acts on the bill. The full line up for the Yamaha Music Stage in London (formally named the Satellite Stage) was announced on 16 November 2015.

The CMA Songwriters series acted as the beginning of C2C, taking place on 9 March and featuring Shane McAnally, Charlie Worsham, Ashley Monroe, Lori McKenna and Charles Esten as well as a special surprise appearance from Miranda Lambert.

Stockholm – 4 March Oslo – 6 March	London – 11 March Dublin – 12 March Glasgow – 13 March	Glasgow – 11 March London – 12 March Dublin – 13 March	Dublin – 11 March Glasgow – 12 March London – 13 March
Main Stage
**Carrie Underwood**; Lauren Alaina; Jill Johnson; Pauper Kings	**Miranda Lambert**; Dwight Yoakam; Thomas Rhett; Ashley Monroe (Dublin & Glasgow)	**Carrie Underwood**; Little Big Town; Sam Hunt; Maddie & Tae (London & Dublin)	**Eric Church**; Kacey Musgraves; Chris Stapleton; Andrew Combs (Glasgow & London)
**Carrie Underwood**; Lauren Alaina; Jill Johnson; Pauper Kings	London Yamaha Music Stage		
**Carrie Underwood**; Lauren Alaina; Jill Johnson; Pauper Kings	Ashley Monroe; Charles Esten	High Valley; Maren Morris	Striking Matches; Frankie Ballard

Headline acts in bold
Satellite Stage acts in italics

Main Stage Set Lists
Ashley Monroe Set List
- 1. I Buried Your Love Alive
- 2. If The Devil Don't Want Me
- 3. Weed Instead of Roses
- 4. On to Something Good
- 5. Has Anybody Ever Told You
- 6. Bad Example
- 7. The Blade
- 8. Dixie
- 9. Winning Streak
Thomas Rhett Set List
- 1. Anthem
- 2. South Side
- 3. Make Me Wanna
- 4. Tangled / Cake by the Ocean
- 5. T-Shirt
- 6. It Goes Like This
- 7. Beer with Jesus
- 8. Die a Happy Man
- 9. Vacation
- 10. Get Me Some of That
- 11. Crash and Burn
Dwight Yoakam Set List
- 1. Dim Lights, Thick Smoke (And Loud, Loud Music)
- 2. Please, Please Baby
- 3. Little Sister
- 4. Streets of Bakersfield
- 5. It Won't Hurt
- 6. The Big Time
- 7. Second Hand Heart
- 8. Ain't That Lonely Yet
- 9. Liar
- 10. Ring of Fire
- 11. Honky Tonk Man
- 12. Always Late with Your Kisses
- 13. A Thousand Miles from Nowhere
- 14. Guitars, Cadillacs
- 15. Fast as You
Miranda Lambert Set List
- 1. Kerosene
- 2. Fastest Girl in Town
- 3. Heart Like Mine
- 4. Sweet Bye and Bye
- 5. Over You
- 6. Bathroom Sink
- 7. Baggage Claim
- 8. Tush
- 9. All Kinds of Kinds
- 10. Smokin' and Drinkin'
- 11. Mama's Broken Heart
- 12. Covered Wagon
- 13. The House That Built Me
- 14. Automatic
- 15. White Liar
- 16. Little Red Wagon
- 17. Gunpowder and Lead
- 18. You've Got a Friend (with Ashley Monroe)
- 19. Bitch
Maddie & Tae Set List
- 1. Right Here, Right Now
- 2. Your Side of Town
- 3. No Place Like You
- 4. Sierra / You Ain't Woman Enough (To Take My Man)
- 5. Shut Up and Fish
- 6. Waitin' On A Plane
- 7. Mirrors
- 8. Fly
- 9. Umbrella
- 10. Girl in a Country Song
Sam Hunt Set List
- 1. Leave the Night On
- 2. Ex to See
- 3. Raised on It
- 4. Single for the Summer
- 5. Cop Car
- 6. Take Your Time
- 7. We Are Tonight / We Found Love
- 8. House Party
- 9. Break Up in a Small Town
Little Big Town Set List
- 1. Jolene
- 2. Little White Church
- 3. Pontoon
- 4. Front Porch Thing
- 5. Faster Gun
- 6. Pain Killer
- 7. Bring It On Home
- 8. Sober
- 9. Tumble and Fall
- 10. Tornado
- 11. Stay All Night
- 12. Save Your Sin
- 13. The Chain
- 14. Day Drinking
- 15. Girl Crush
- 16. Boondocks
Carrie Underwood Set List
- 1. Renegade Runaway
- 2. Last Name / Somethin' Bad
- 3. Undo It
- 4. Good Girl
- 5. Church Bells
- 6. Cowboy Casanova
- 7. Heartbeat
- 8. Jesus, Take the Wheel
- 9. Wasted
- 10. Chaser
- 11. Blown Away
- 12. Two Black Cadillacs
- 13. Dirty Laundry
- 14. Choctaw County Affair
- 15. I Will Always Love You
- 16. Clock Don't Stop
- 17. Flat on the Floor
- 18. Little Toy Guns
- 19. Before He Cheats
- 20. Smoke Break
- 21. Something in the Water
Andrew Combs Set List
- 1. Foolin'
- 2. Please, Please, Please
- 3. Suwannee County
- 4. All These Dreams
- 5. Emily
- 6. Too Stoned To Cry
- 7. Month of Bad Habits
Chris Stapleton Set List
- 1. Nobody to Blame
- 2. Might As Well Get Stoned
- 3. If It Hadn't Been for Love
- 4. Whiskey and You
- 5. Traveller
- 6. Fire Away
- 7. You Are My Sunshine (with Morgane Stapleton)
- 8. Tennessee Whiskey
Kacey Musgraves Set List
- 1. Pageant Material
- 2. Biscuits
- 3. Silver Lining
- 4. This Town
- 5. Step Off
- 6. Family Is Family
- 7. Fine
- 8. It Is What It Is
- 9. Crazy
- 10. Merry Go 'Round
- 11. High Time
- 12. A Spoonful of Sugar
- 13. Late To The Party
- 14. Die Fun
- 15. Follow Your Arrow
- 16. These Boots Are Made for Walkin'
Eric Church Set List
- 1. Knives of New Orleans
- 2. Cold One
- 3. Creepin'
- 4. Drink in My Hand
- 5. Give Me Back My Hometown
- 6. Mr. Misunderstood
- 7. Talladega
- 8. That's Damn Rock and Roll
- 9. Homeboy
- 10. Like a Wrecking Ball
- 11. Mistress Named Music
- 12. Lotta Boot Left to Fill
- 13. Chattanooga Lucy
- 14. These Boots
- 15. Record Year
- 16. Smoke a Little Smoke
- 17. Jack Daniels
- 18. Dancing in the Dark / Springsteen
- 19. Three Year Old

=== London pop-up stages ===
- A Thousand Horses
- Alan West and Steve Black
- Alice Wallace
- American Young
- Ashley Campbell
- Ashton Lane
- Balsamo Deighton
- Barry Dean ^{b}
- Benjamin Folke Thomas
- Brooke Eden
- Callaghan
- Carolynne Poole
- Case Hardin
- CC Smugglers
- Charles Esten ^{b}
- Charlie Worsham
- Chisum Cattle Co.
- Cooper & Davies
- Crash N Recovery
- Darline
- David Nail
- Dexeter
- Gary Burr ^{b}
- Georgia Middleman ^{b}
- Western Tears
- Emma Stevens
- Erin Kinsey
- Frankie Davies
- Foreign Affairs
- High Valley
- Holloway Road
- Honey Ryder
- ILONA
- Jeannine Barry
- Jess and the Bandits
- Jessi Alexander ^{b}
- Laura Oakes
- Lauren Alaina
- Lori McKenna ^{b}
- Lucy May
- Luke and Mel
- Kimmie Rhodes
- Knoxville Highway
- Maren Morris ^{b}
- Megan O'Neill
- Old Dominion ^{b}
- ORFILA
- Outlander
- Paul Carella
- Pauper Kings
- Phil Vassar
- Rackhouse Pilfer
- Ray Peters and the Smokey Turtle Band
- Red Pine Timber Company
- Red Sky July
- Robert Vincent
- Sadie and the Hotheads
- Sam Coe and the Longshadows
- Sarah Darling
- Shane McAnally ^{b}
- Sonia Leigh
- Southern Companion
- Southern Junction
- Striking Matches ^{b}
- The Rising
- The Shires
- Texas Martha and the House of Twang
- Wire and Wool

== C2C: Country to Country 2017 ==
The fifth C2C festival was announced at the conclusion of the previous year's festival. It ran over three nights from 10 to 12 March 2017. Early bird tickets for the o2 Arena in London went on sale at 9.00am on 18 March 2016. The line-up was announced in "waves", with the first wave being announced on 24 October 2016 via a launch event at the Brooklyn Bowl. The 3-day breakdown was released on 1 November, with Reba McEntire and Marty Stuart announced as the final two acts the following day at 4pm. Una Healy appeared on the Spotlight Stage in Dublin on 12 March, opening for Reba.

The remainder of the Yamaha Music Stage acts for London were announced on 24 January 2017.

The CMA Songwriters Series returned to kick off the festival on 9 March and featured Kristian Bush, Maren Morris, Mac McAnally, Drake White and Liz Rose.

London – 10 March Dublin – 11 March Glasgow – 12 March	Glasgow – 10 March London – 11 March Dublin – 12 March	Dublin – 10 March Glasgow – 11 March London – 12 March
Main Stage
**Brad Paisley**; Chris Young; Jennifer Nettles; Cam (Dublin & Glasgow)	**Reba McEntire**; Darius Rucker; Hunter Hayes; Dan + Shay (London & Dublin)	**Zac Brown Band**; Marty Stuart; Maren Morris; Brothers Osborne (Glasgow & London)
London Yamaha Music Stage
Cam; Chase Bryant	Cassadee Pope; Seth Ennis; Bailey Bryan	Jana Kramer; Lucie Silvas; Drake White

Headline acts in bold
Satellite Stage acts in italics

Note: The set lists below are from the London show, with the exception of Cam's set (which is taken from her Glasgow performance).

Main Stage Set Lists
Cam Set List
- 1. My Mistake
- 2. Want It All
- 3. Hungover on Heartache
- 4. Half Broke Heart
- 5. Mayday
- 6. Runaway Train
- 7. Cold in California
- 8. Village
- 9. Country Ain't Never Been Pretty
- 10. Burning House
Jennifer Nettles Set List
- 1. Playing with Fire
- 2. Baby Girl
- 3. Drunk in Heels
- 4. Hey Heartbreak
- 5. Unlove You
- 6. Sugar/Whatta Man/Shoop (Salt-N-Pepa covers)
- 7. Want To
- 8. Everybody Wants to Rule the World (Tears for Fears cover)
- 9. Stay
- 10. Something More
Chris Young Set List
- 1. Underdogs
- 2. Gettin' You Home
- 3. Voices
- 4. I Can Take It from There
- 5. Who I Am with You
- 6. Aw Naw
- 7. Lonely Eyes
- 8. Sober Saturday Night
- 9. Sharp Dressed Man (ZZ Top cover)
- 10. When You Say Nothing at All (Keith Whitley cover)
- 11. Think of You with Cassadee Pope
- 12. You
- 13. Save Water, Drink Beer
- 14. Tomorrow
- 15. Neon
- 16. I'm Comin' Over
Brad Paisley Set List
- 1. Crushin' It
- 2. American Saturday Night
- 3. Water
- 4. Perfect Storm
- 5. Country Nation
- 6. This Is Country Music
- 7.I'm Still a Guy with Chris Young
- 8. She's Everything
- 9. Online/Ticks with Chase Bryant
- 10. Celebrity
- 11. Old Alabama*
- 12. Then
- 13. Ashamed Of Your Selfie
- 14. Southern Comfort Zone
- 15. I'm Gonna Miss Her
- 16. Remind Me*
- 17. We Danced/Whiskey Lullaby
- 18. River Bank
- 19. Mud on the Tires
- 20. Today
- 21. The Mona Lisa
- 22. Alcohol
– *Alabama and Carrie Underwood appeared in pre-recorded video segments to perform their parts of "Old Alabama" and "Remind Me"
Dan + Shay Set List
- 1. All Nighter
- 2. Nothin' Like You
- 3. Stop Drop And Roll
- 4. You Give Love a Bad Name (Bon Jovi cover)
- 5. Road Trippin'
- 6. Show You Off
- 7. From the Ground Up
- 8. Obsessed
- 9. How Not To
- 10. 19 You + Me
Hunter Hayes Set List
- 1. I Want Crazy
- 2. Storm Warning
- 3. Tattoo
- 4. Somebody's Heartbreak with Charlie Worsham
- 5. Amen
- 6. Tell Me
- 7. Light Me Up
- 8. Yesterday's Song
- 9. Wanted
Darius Rucker Set List
- 1. Lighter Up
- 2. Radio
- 3. Southern State Of Mind
- 4. If I Told You
- 5. True Believers
- 6. First Time
- 7. It Won't Be Like This for Long
- 8. Friends in Low Places/No Diggity (Garth Brooks/Blackstreet covers)
- 9. This
- 10. Alright
- 11. Hold My Hand
- 12. Homegrown Honey
- 13. Only Wanna Be with You
- 14. Come Back Song
- 15. Wagon Wheel (Old Crow Medicine Show cover)
- 16. Purple Rain (Prince cover)
Reba McEntire Set List
- 1. Can't Even Get the Blues
- 2. The Fear of Being Alone
- 3. One Promise Too Late
- 4. How Blue
- 5. Whoever's in New England
- 6. Little Rock
- 7. And Still
- 8. Going Out Like That
- 9. You're No Good (Linda Ronstadt cover)/The Heart Is a Lonely Hunter/Walk On/I'd Rather Ride Around with You
- 10. The Greatest Man I Never Knew
- 11. Back To God
- 12. Swing Low, Sweet Chariot (traditional cover)
- 13. Strange
- 14. Because of You (Kelly Clarkson cover)
- 15. Turn On the Radio
- 16. The Night the Lights Went Out in Georgia (Vicki Lawrence cover)
- 17. Does He Love You
- 18. Take It Back/Why Haven't I Heard from You
- 19. I'm a Survivor
- 20. Is There Life Out There
- 21. Fancy (Bobbie Gentry cover)
Brothers Osborne Set List
- 1. Down Home
- 2. Rum
- 3. Greener Pastures
- 4. 21 Summer
- 5. Shoot From The Hip
- 6. Loving Me Back
- 7. Stay a Little Longer
- 8. It Ain't My Fault
Maren Morris Set List
- 1. Sugar
- 2. Drunk Girls Don't Cry
- 3. 80s Mercedes
- 4. I Could Use a Love Song
- 5. How It's Done
- 6. Bumming Cigarettes
- 7. Just Another Thing
- 8. I Wish I Was
- 9. Once
- 10. Rich
- 11. My Church
- 12. Second Wind/Halo (Beyoncé cover)
Marty Stuart Set List
- 1. I Know You Rider
- 2. A Whole Lotta Highway (With A Million Miles To Go)
- 3. Country Boy Rock And Roll
- 4. The Whiskey Ain't Workin'
- 5. Mojave
- 6. Tempted
- 7. Old Mexico
- 8. Country Music Got A Hold On Me (performed by "Cousin" Kenny Vaughn)
- 9. Hot Like That (performed by "Cousin" Kenny Vaughn)
- 10. El Paso (Marty Robbins cover)
- 11. Old Souls Like You And Me (performed by "Professor" Chris Scruggs)
- 12. The Ballad Of Pretty Boy Floyd (performed by "Handsome" Harry Stinson) (Woody Guthrie cover)
- 13. Dark Bird
- 14. Orange Blossom Special (Johnny Cash cover)
- 15. Time Don't Wait
Zac Brown Band Set List
- 1. Homegrown
- 2. As She's Walking Away
- 3. Whiskey's Gone
- 4. Goodbye in Her Eyes
- 5. Devil Went Down to Georgia (Charlie Daniels Band cover)
- 6. My Old Man
- 7. Toes
- 8. Sweet Annie
- 9. Bohemian Rhapsody (Queen)
- 10. Keep Me in Mind with Marty Stuart
- 11. The Real Thing
- 12. Loving You Easy
- 13. Baba O'Riley (The Who cover)
- 14. Free with Drake White/Into the Mystic (Van Morrison cover)
- 15. The Day That I Die
- 16. Tomorrow Never Comes
- 17. Colder Weather
- 18. Jump Right In
- 19. Beautiful Drug
- 20. Chicken Fried

=== London pop-up stages ===
- Backwoods Creek
- Bailey Bryan
- Beth Thornton
- Caitlin Koch
- Canaan Smith ^{b}
- Case Hardin
- Cassadee Pope ^{b}
- Catherine McGrath
- Charlie Worsham ^{b}
- Chase Bryant
- Chisum Cattle Co.
- Clara Bond
- Dana Immanuel
- Dominic Halpin
- Drake White
- Gary Quinn
- Have Mercy Las Vegas
- Holloway Road
- Jade Helliwell
- Jake Morrell
- Jamie Stanton and Roadkill Revival
- Jana Kramer
- Jarrod Dickenson
- Jeff Cohen ^{b}
- Josh Osborne ^{b}
- Laura Evans
- Legends of Country
- Lisa McHugh
- Logan Brill ^{b}
- Lucie Silvas ^{b}
- Katy Hurt
- Kevin McGuire
- Kristian Bush
- Kete Bowers
- Mac McAnally
- Martha L. Healy
- Melanie
- Miss Winter
- Orfila
- Rackhouse Pilfer
- Raintown
- Robert Chaney
- Sam Coe and the Longshadows
- Sarah Darling
- Seth Ennis ^{b}
- Shootin' The Crow
- Square One
- Smooth Hound Smith
- Temecula Road
- The Hardy Band
- The Honey Ants
- The Long Haul Band
- The Shires
- The Wandering Hearts
- Thunderbridge Bluegrass Band
- Trea Landon
- Twinnie-Lee Moore
- Una Healy
- Ward Thomas
- Worry Dolls

^b Also part of the Bluebird Café at C2C event

== C2C: Country to Country 2018 ==
The sixth C2C festival was announced on the final day of the 2017 festival and ran over three nights from 9–11 March 2018. On 28 September 2017, Bob Harris announced that the first 2018 headliners would be Tim McGraw and Faith Hill (who would be bringing their Soul2Soul Tour to the UK for the very first time) on his BBC Radio 2 programme. Kelsea Ballerini was announced on 3 October by Ricky Ross on BBC Radio Scotland. On 5 October, Little Big Town were confirmed as the second headline act with majority of the line-up being revealed the following day on 6 October at the official launch event. On 16 October, Old Dominion were announced along with the three day breakdown. It was also revealed that Ashley Campbell would perform a special tribute to her father, Glen Campbell in London. On 23 November, Brett Young was confirmed for the main stage in Glasgow and Dublin as well as the Yamaha stage in London. For the first time, C2C announced that Glasgow would feature a Spotlight stage. On 8 December, Sugarland were announced as the final main stage act. Composed of C2C alumni Kristian Bush and Jennifer Nettles, the duo reformed in 2017 and are billed as "special guests", their appearances was their first full-band shows in five years.

The CMA Songwriters Series held on 8 March featured Brett James, Natalie Hemby, Kip Moore, Nicolle Galyon and Luke Combs.

London – 9 March Glasgow – 10 March Dublin – 11 March	Dublin – 9 March London – 10 March Glasgow – 11 March	Glasgow – 9 March Dublin – 10 March London – 11 March
Main Stage
**Tim McGraw and Faith Hill**; Kelsea Ballerini; Old Dominion; Brett Young (Dublin & Glasgow)	**Kacey Musgraves**; Sugarland; Kip Moore; Luke Combs	**Little Big Town**; Emmylou Harris; Margo Price; Midland
London Spotlight Stage
Brett Young; Morgan Evans	Ashley Campbell; Lukas Nelson; Jillian Jaqueline; Ashley McBryde	Walker Hayes; Russell Dickerson; Lindsay Ell
Glasgow Spotlight Stage
Morgan Evans; Ryan Kinder	Delta Rae; Catherine McGrath	Ashley Campbell; Lukas Nelson

- Headline acts in **bold**, Satellite stage acts in italics
Main Stage Set Lists
Brett Young Set List
- 1. Close Enough
- 2. Like I Loved You
- 3. Mercy
- 4. In Case You Didn't Know
- 5. Sleep Without You
Old Dominion Set List
- 1. Song for Another Time
- 2. Wrong Turns
- 3. So You Go
- 4. Be With Me
- 5. Written in the Sand
- 6. Hotel Key
- 7. No Such Thing as a Broken Heart
- 8. Can't Get You
- 9. Nowhere Fast
- 10. Break Up with Him
- 11. Not Everything's About You
- 12. Snapback
Kelsea Ballerini Set List
- 1. Love Me Like You Mean It
- 2. Miss Me More
- 3. Get Over Yourself
- 4. Legends
- 5. Dibs
- 6. In Between
- 7. I Hate Love Songs
- 8. Music
- 9. Peter Pan
- 10. Unapologetically
- 11. Yeah Boy
Faith Hill and Tim McGraw Set List
- 1. I Knew You Were Waiting For Me (Aretha Franklin and George Michael cover)
- 2. Felt Good on My Lips
- 3. The Lucky One
- 4. I Like It, I Love It
- 5. The Way You Love Me
- 6. Like We Never Loved at All
- 7. Break First
- 8. Telluride
- 9. Free
- 10. This Kiss
- 11. Breathe
- 12. Wild One
- 13. Stronger
- 14. Piece of My Heart
- 15. Angry All the Time
- 16. One of Those Nights
- 17. Real Good Man
- 18. Shotgun Rider
- 19. Humble and Kind
- 20. Live Like You Were Dying
- 21. Speak to a Girl
- 22. It's Your Love
- 23. Mississippi Girl
- 24. Something Like That
- 25. I Need You
Ashley Campbell Set List
- 1. Glen Campbell Medley
  - Gentle on My Mind
  - Southern Nights
  - Galveston
  - Wichita Lineman
- 2. Remembering
Luke Combs Set List
- 1. Out There
- 2. She Got the Best of Me
- 3. Honky Tonk Highway/Boot Scootin' Boogie (Brooks & Dunn cover)
- 4. Beer Never Broke My Heart
- 5. When It Rains It Pours
- 6. One Number Away
- 7. Take It Easy (Eagles cover)/ Cowboys Like Us (George Strait cover)/ Chasin' That Neon Rainbow (Alan Jackson cover)
- 8. Moonshine
- 9. Hurricane
Kip Moore Set List
- 1. Wild Ones
- 2. Plead the Fifth
- 3. Beer Money
- 4. Just Another Girl
- 5. The Bull
- 6. Bittersweet Company
- 7. Hey Pretty Girl
- 8. Somethin' 'Bout a Truck
- 9. Guitar Man
Sugarland Set List
- 1. Find the Beat Again
- 2. All I Want to Do
- 3. Stuck Like Glue
- 4. Want To
- 5. Already Gone
- 6. Still the Same
- 7. Little Miss
- 8. Trailer Hitch
- 9. Unlove You
- 10. Incredible Machine
- 11. Settlin'
- 12. It Happens
- 13. Stay
- 14. Baby Girl
- 15. Something More
- 16. Alive and Kicking (Simple Minds cover)
Kacey Musgraves Set List
- 1. Slow Burn
- 2. Stupid
- 3. Butterflies
- 4. Silver Lining
- 5. Fine
- 6. Mama's Broken Heart (Miranda Lambert cover)
- 7. Late to the Party
- 8. Love Is a Wild Thing
- 9. Family Is Family
- 10. It Is What It Is
- 11. Keep It To Yourself
- 12. Velvet Elvis
- 13. Rainbow
- 14. High Time
- 15. Space Cowboy
- 16. Follow Your Arrow
- 17. Merry Go 'Round
- 18. Neon Moon (Brooks & Dunn cover)
- 19. High Horse
Midland Set List
- 1. Check Cashin' Country
- 2. This Old Heart
- 3. At Least You Cried
- 4. Burn Out
- 5. American Girl (Tom Petty cover)
- 6. Jack & Diane (John Mellencamp cover)/ Dust on the Bottle (David Lee Murphy cover)/ Dixieland Delight (Alabama cover)
- 7. Make a Little
- 8. More Than a Fever
- 9. Altitude Adjustment
- 10. Drinkin' Problem
Margo Price Set List
- 1. Don't Say It
- 2. Do Right By Me
- 3. Tennessee Song
- 4. Learning To Lose with Lukas Nelson
- 5. Wild Women
- 6. Cocaine Cowboys
- 7. A Little Pain
- 8. Paper Cowboy
- 9. Hurtin' (On the Bottle)/I Think I'll Just Stay Here and Drink (Merle Haggard cover)/ Whiskey River (Willie Nelson cover) with Lukas Nelson
- 10. Proud Mary (Creedence Clearwater Revival cover) with Lukas Nelson
Emmylou Harris Set List
- 1. Here I Am
- 2. Orphan Girl (Gillian Welch cover)
- 3. Making Believe
- 4. Red Dirt Girl
- 5. Wheels (Flying Burrito Bros cover)
- 6. Luxury Liner
- 7. Pancho and Lefty (Townes Van Zandt cover)
- 8. Michelangelo
- 9. Green Pastures (Ralph Stanley cover)
- 10. Old Five and Dimers Like Me (Billy Joe Shaver cover)
- 11. Get Up John (Bill Monroe cover)
- 12. Shores of White Sand
- 13. The Pearl
- 14. Boulder to Birmingham
Little Big Town Set List
- 1. Rocket Man (Elton John cover)
- 2. Drivin' Around
- 3. Pontoon
- 4. Happy People
- 5. Front Porch Thing
- 6. When Someone Stops Loving You
- 7. Little White Church
- 8. Bring It On Home to Me
- 9. Sober
- 10. Your Side of the Bed
- 11. Wichita Lineman (Glen Campbell cover)
- 12. I'm with the Band/ With a Little Help from My Friends (The Beatles cover)
- 13. Save Your Sin
- 14. Better Man
- 15. Can't Go Back
- 16. Rollin'
- 17. Tornado
- 18. Day Drinking
- 19. Stay All Night
- 20. Girl Crush
- 21. Boondocks

=== London pop-up stages ===
- American Young
- Andy Brown
- Ashley Campbell
- Ashley McBryde^{b}
- Brett Young
- Catherine McGrath
- Clara Bond
- Danielle Bradbery
- Days Are Done
- Delta Rae
- DJ Hish
- Elles Bailey
- FAYRE
- Ferris and Sylvester
- High Valley
- Holloway Road
- Jake Morrell
- Jeannine Barry
- Jillian Jacqueline^{b}
- Katy Hurt
- Kerri Watt
- Keywest
- LANCO
- Lars Pluto
- Leslie Satcher^{b}
- Levi Hummon
- Lindsay Ell
- Liv Austen
- Liz McClarnon
- Lost Hollow
- Lukas Nelson
- Mo Pitney^{b}
- Morgan Evans
- O & O
- Peter Donegan
- Russell Dickerson
- Ryan Hurd^{b}
- Ryan Kinder
- Sammie Jay
- Sarah Darling
- Stephanie Quayle
- The Adelaides
- The Grahams
- The Shires
- The Wandering Hearts
- Twinnie-Lee Moore
- Una Healy
- Walker Hayes^{b}
- Ward Thomas

^b Part of the Bluebird Café at C2C event

== C2C: Country to Country 2019 ==
The seventh C2C festival was announced on the final day of the 2018 festival and ran over three nights from 8–10 March 2019. The line-up was announced on 22 October 2018 during the CMA songwriters tour at Shepherd's Bush Empire, with tickets going on sale on 26 October 2018. On 30 October 2018, C2C announced that a one night C2C would take place at AFAS Live in Amsterdam, and a two night festival in Berlin at the Verti Music Hall. Additionally, two events under the C2C banner would take place in Australia, albeit with a different line-up to the rest of the events held in 2019. Midland, Kelsea Ballerini, Eric Paslay, RaeLynn, Blanco Brown, The McClymonts and headliner Tim McGraw are set to perform in Sydney and Brisbane on 28 and 29 September respectively.

The CMA Songwriters Series was held on 7 March 2019 and featured Cam, Jimmie Allen, Laura Veltz, Ross Copperman and Travis Denning.

Berlin – 2 March	Berlin – 3 March	Amsterdam – 4 March
**Brett Eldredge**; Hunter Hayes	**Keith Urban**; Cam; Drake White	**Keith Urban**; Brett Eldredge; Drake White

London – 8 March Glasgow – 9 March Dublin – 10 March	Dublin – 8 March London – 9 March Glasgow – 10 March	Glasgow – 8 March Dublin – 9 March London – 10 March
Main Stage
**Keith Urban**; Brett Eldredge; Cam; Chase Rice	**Lady Antebellum**; Hunter Hayes; Dustin Lynch; Carly Pearce; Caroline Jones (Dublin)	**Chris Stapleton**; Lyle Lovett; Ashley McBryde; Drake White
London Spotlight Stage
Runaway June; Abby Anderson; Adam Hambrick	Michael Ray; Catherine McGrath; Fairground Saints	Jimmie Allen; The Wandering Hearts; Caroline Jones
Glasgow Spotlight Stage
Michael Ray; The Wandering Hearts	Logan Mize; Caroline Jones	Travis Denning; Ingrid Andress
London BBC Radio 2 Stage – Indigo
Fairground Saints; RaeLynn; Jimmie Allen	Sarah Darling; Sam Palladio; Noah Schnacky; Travis Denning; Runaway June; James Barker Band; Craig Campbell	Twinnie; Lainey Wilson; Abby Anderson; Michael Ray; Adam Hambrick; Lauren Jenkins; Logan Mize

- Headline acts in **bold**, Satellite stage acts in italics
Main Stage Set Lists
Chase Rice
- 1. On Tonight
- 2. Jack Daniel's Showed Up
- 3. Gonna Wanna Tonight
- 4. Three Chords & the Truth
- 5. Eyes on You
- 6. Ride
- 7. Cruise
- 8. Jack Daniels & Jesus
- 9. Ready Set Roll
Cam
- 1. Diane
- 2. Mayday
- 3. Runaway Train
- 4. Forgetting You When I'm Alone
- 5. My Mistake
- 6. Palace (Sam Smith cover)
- 7. Til' There's Nothing Left
- 8. Nothing Breaks Like a Heart (Mark Ronson and Miley Cyrus cover)
- 9. Jolene (Dolly Parton cover)
- 10. Burning House
Brett Eldredge
1. Lose My Mind
2. Somethin' I'm Good At
3. Cycles
4. Don't Ya
5. Crazy Little Thing Called Love (Queen cover)
6. Raymond
7. The Long Way
8. Mean to Me
9. Love Someone
10. Drunk on Your Love
11. The Reason / My Girl (The Temptations cover)
12. Time Well Spent
13. Wanna Be That Song
14. Beat of the Music
Keith Urban
1. Never Comin Down
2. Days Go By
3. Coming Home*
4. Somewhere in My Car
5. Long Hot Summer
6. Parallel Line
7. Put You in a Song
8. Stupid Boy
9. Somebody Like You
10. Blue Ain't Your Color
11. Drop Top*
12. Cop Car
13. You'll Think of Me
14. The Fighter*
15. Kiss a Girl / Who Wouldn't Wanna Be Me / You Look Good in My Shirt
16. Gone Tomorrow (Here Today)
17. Wasted Time
– *Julia Michaels, Kassi Ashton and Carrie Underwood appeared in pre-recorded video segments to perform their parts of "Coming Home", "Drop Top" and "The Fighter"
Carly Pearce
- 1. Careless
- 2. Playing with Fire
- 3. Doin' It Right
- 4. Everybody Gonna Talk
- 5. Man! I Feel Like a Woman! (Shania Twain cover)
- 6 . Closer to You
- 7. Those Memories of You / Driving Nails / Sin Wagon (Dolly Parton, Linda Ronstadt and Emmylou Harris cover/Ernest Tubb cover/Dixie Chicks cover)
- 8. If My Name Was Whiskey
- 9. Every Little Thing
- 10. Hide the Wine
Dustin Lynch
- 1. Hell of a Night
- 2. Where It's At
- 3. I'd Be Jealous Too
- 4. Mind Reader
- 5. Good Girl
- 6. Someone like You (Adele cover)/ Cowboys and Angels
- 7. Friends in Low Places (Garth Brooks cover)
- 8. Seein' Red
- 10. Small Town Boy
Hunter Hayes
- 1. One Shot
- 2. Yesterday's Song
- 3. Light Me Up
- 4. Heartbreak
- 5. Somebody's Heartbreak
- 6. Don't Let Me Forget (with Catherine McGrath)
- 7. Rescue
- 8. Invisible
- 9. Amazing Grace (Traditional cover)
- 10. Dear God
- 11. Wanted
- 12. Tattoo
- 13. Storm Warning
- 14. I Want Crazy
Lady Antebellum
- 1. I Run to You
- 2. Bartender
- 3. Just a Kiss
- 4. Heart Break
- 5. Compass
- 6. American Honey
- 7. What If I Never Get Over You
- 8. Lookin' for a Good Time / Suspicious Minds (Elvis Presley cover)
- 9. Our Kind of Love
- 10. Hello World
- 11. When You Got a Good Thing / Dancin' Away with My Heart / Wanted You More
- 12. Be Patient with My Love
- 13. Slow Hands (Niall Horan cover with Carly Pearce and Hunter Hayes)
- 14. You Look Good
- 15. Downtown
- 16. Love Don't Live Here Anymore
- 17. Need You Now
- 18. We Owned the Night
Drake White
- 1. It Feels Good
- 2. Heartbeat
- 3. Free
- 4. Story
- 5. The Coast is Clear
- 6. Makin' Me Look Good Again
- 7. Livin' the Dream
- 8. Fat Bottomed Girls (Queen cover)
Ashley McBryde
- 1. Livin' Next to Leroy
- 2. El Dorado
- 3. The Jacket
- 4. American Scandal
- 5. Fat and Famous
- 6. Girl Going Nowhere
- 7. Rattlesnake Preacher
- 8. Home Sweet Highway
- 9. A Little Dive Bar in Dahlonega
- 10. Tired of Being Happy
Lyle Lovett
- 1. Cute as a Bug
- 2. Pants is Overrated
- 3. I Will Rise Up
- 4. My Baby Don't Tolerate
- 5. North Dakota
- 6. Twelfth of June
- 7. If I Had a Boat
- 8. Here I Am
- 9. What Do You Do
- 10. Wild Women Don't Have the Blues (performed by Francine Reed)
- 11. That's Right (You're Not from Texas)
- 12. Church
- 13. White Freightliner's Blues
Chris Stapleton
- 1. Midnight Train to Memphis
- 2. Nobody to Blame
- 3. Hard Livin'
- 4. Millionaire
- 5. Fire Away
- 6. Might As Well Get Stoned
- 7. Nobody's Lonely Tonight
- 8. Whiskey and You
- 9. Either Way
- 10. More of You
- 11. Broken Halos
- 12. Second One to Know
- 13. Traveller
- 14. Outlaw State of Mind
- 15. Parachute
- 16. Tennessee Whiskey
- 17. Sometimes I Cry

=== London pop-up stages ===
- Abby Anderson
- Adam Hambrick^{b}
- Backwoods Creek
- Caroline Jones
- Catherine McGrath^{b}
- CC Smugglers
- Copper Viper
- Craig Campbell^{b}
- Fairground Saints
- Foreign Affairs
- DJ Hish
- [Holly Rose Webber
- Ingrid Andress
- Jade Helliwell
- Jake Morrell
- James Barker Band
- Jeff Cohen^{b}
- Jimmie Allen
- Kaylee Bell
- Kelly Archer^{b}
- Kenny Foster]
- Kerri Watt
- Lainey Wilson
- Laura Oakes
- Lauren Jenkins
- Lisa Wright
- Logan Mize
- Megan O'Neill
- Michael Ray^{b}
- Molly-Anne
- Morganway
- Noah Schnacky
- Noble Jacks
- RaeLynn
- Remember Monday
- Robert Vincent^{b}
- Runaway June
- Sam Lewis
- Sam Palladio
- Sarah Darling^{b}
- The Adelaides
- The Blue Highways
- The Wandering Hearts
- Travis Denning
- Twinnie-Lee Moore

^b Also part of the Bluebird Café at C2C event

== C2C: Country to Country 2020/21 ==
The eighth consecutive C2C festival was announced during the final day of the 2019 edition, and was planned to have run over three nights from 13 to 15 March 2020 in London, Glasgow and Dublin. C2C was also planned to have returned to Berlin from 6–8 March, the Netherlands between 7 and 8 March and Australia at an unspecified date. The line-up was at the official launch event on 21 October 2019 at Cadogan Hall during the Introducing Nashville concert featuring performances by Danielle Bradbery, Chris Lane, Travis Denning and Rachel Wammack. Old Dominion were originally scheduled to perform but withdrew on 6 March 2020 due to concerns over the COVID-19 pandemic and they were replaced by The Shires who were to be the first UK-grown country act to perform on the main stage.

The CMA Songwriters Series was set to feature Tenille Townes, Phil Barton, Caylee Hammack, Niko Moon and Jaren Johnston. The original line-up also included Hillary Lindsey, Liz Rose and Lori McKenna; however, they withdrew on 6 March. The show was cancelled on 12 March. The COVID-19 pandemic put a hold on all scheduled concerts and festivals around the world. As concerns over the pandemic worsened and several countries began implementing travel restrictions, the 2020 Country to Country festival was cancelled. The main stage was due to feature Eric Church, Darius Rucker and Luke Combs as headliners with Tanya Tucker, Old Crow Medicine Show, The Cadillac Three, Charles Esten, Brett Young, Runaway June, Jordan Davis, Tenille Townes, Eric Paslay and Abby Anderson also performing.

The 2021 edition of C2C was also cancelled due to the ongoing pandemic, with the new dates for 2022 being announced as 11–13 March.

The C2C festival in Berlin and Amsterdam did take place during the weekend of 7 and 8 March. Though Old Dominion cancelled their performance due to concerns over the COVID-19 pandemic.

Amsterdam 7 March	Amsterdam 8 March
**Luke Combs**; Brett Young; Charles Esten; Joe Buck	**Darius Rucker**; Jimmie Allen; The Cadillac Three; Tenille Townes, Abby Anderson and Eric Paslay

- Headline acts in **bold**

== C2C: Country to Country 2022 ==
After two years of cancellation, the initial lineup for the eighth C2C festival was announced on 13 September 2021. Luke Combs and Darius Rucker return as headliners after previously being booked for the 2020 festival and Miranda Lambert returns to headline for the second time, replacing Eric Church whose American tour dates clashed with the 2022 festival. Brett Young and Runaway June also remained in the lineup from the cancelled 2020 event, though Runaway June later cancelled due to a pregnancy within the group and were replaced by Tenille Townes. On 15 December, Priscilla Block, Tiera Kennedy and Morgan Wade were announced as the Introducing Nashville artists. The pop-up acts were announced on 14 February. Charles Kelley from Lady A (with Russell Dickerson) and Ed Sheeran (with Luke Combs) both made guest appearances at the London show.

London – 11 March Glasgow – 12 March Dublin – 13 March	Dublin – 11 March London – 12 March Glasgow – 13 March	Glasgow – 11 March Dublin – 12 March London – 13 March
Main Stage
**Miranda Lambert**; Kip Moore; Russell Dickerson; Priscilla Block, Tiera Kennedy and Morgan Wade	**Darius Rucker**; Brett Young; Scotty McCreery; Tenille Townes	**Luke Combs**; Ashley McBryde; Flatland Cavalry; Hailey Whitters
London Spotlight Stage
Erin Kinsey; Breland; Brittney Spencer	Callista Clark; Matt Stell; Callie Twisselman	Tenille Arts; Seaforth; Avery Anna
Glasgow Spotlight Stage
London BBC Radio 2 Stage – Indigo

- Headline acts in **bold**, Satellite stage acts in italics
Main Stage Set Lists
Introducing Nashville
- 1. Take Me Away
- 2. Found It in You
- 3. My Bar
- 4. The Night
- 5. Gentleman
- 6. Just About Over You
- 7. Wilder Days
- 8. Alabama Nights
- 9. Peaked in High School
Russell Dickerson
- 1. Never Get Old
- 2. Every Little Thing
- 3. She Likes It
- 4. Forever For a Little While
- 5. Home Sweet with Charles Kelley
- 6. Love You Like I Used To
- 7. MGNO/Shut Up and Dance/I Wanna Dance with Somebody (Walk the Moon/Whitney Houston cover)
- 8. It's About Time
- 9. Yours
- 10. Blue Tacoma
Kip Moore
- 1. All Time Low
- 2. Crazy One More Time
- 3. Wild Ones
- 4. Plead the Fifth
- 5. Beer Money
- 6. Southpaw
- 7. She's Mine
- 8. Everybody Wants to Rule the World (Tears for Fears cover)
- 9. More Girls Like You
- 10. Just Another Girl
- 11.. That Was Us
- 12. Hey Pretty Girl
- 13. The Bull
- 14. Heart's Desire
- 15. Somethin' 'Bout a Truck
- 16. Come and Get It
- 17. Last Shot
Miranda Lambert
- 1. White Trash
- 2. Kerosene
- 3. Fastest Girl in Town
- 4. Famous in a Small Town
- 5. If I Was a Cowboy
- 6. Settling Down
- 7. It All Comes Out in the Wash
- 8. Heart Like Mine
- 9. Only Prettier
- 10. Actin' Up
- 11. Vice
- 12. Bluebird
- 13. Dark Bars
- 14. The House That Built Me
- 15. Automatic
- 16. Tequila Does
- 17. That's the Way That the World Goes Round (John Prine cover)
- 18. Gunpowder & Lead
- 19. Mama's Broken Heart
- 20. White Liar
- 21. Little Red Wagon
- 22. Drunk (And I Don't Wanna Go Home)
Tenille Townes
- 1. White Horse
- 2. Where You Are
- 3. Jersey on the Wall (I'm Just Asking)
- 4. At Last (Etta James cover)
- 5. When's It Gonna Happen
- 6. I Kept the Roses
- 7. Girl Who Didn't Care
- 8. Holding Out for the One/Steve McQueen (Sheryl Crow cover)
- 9. I Hate Myself for Loving You (Joan Jett cover)
- 10. Somebody's Daughter
Scotty McCreery
- 1. Same Truck
- 2. Why You Gotta Be Like That
- 3. Damn Strait
- 4. It Matters to Her
- 5. In Between
- 6. Feelin' It
- 7. See You Tonight
- 8. She's Not the Cheatin' Kind (Brooks & Dunn cover)
- 9. Five More Minutes
- 10. You Time
Brett Young
- 1. Catch
- 2. 1, 2, 3 Mississippi
- 3. Like I Loved You
- 4. You Ain't Here to Kiss Me
- 5. This
- 6. You Got Away With It
- 7. Ticket to L.A.
- 8. In Case You Didn't Know
- 9. Have a Little Faith in Me (John Hiatt cover)
- 10. Mercy
- 11. Not Yet
- 12. Used to Missin' You
- 13. Leave Me Alone
- 14. Weekends Look a Little Different These Days
- 15. Lady
- 16. Here Tonight
- 17. You Didn't
- 18. Sleep Without You
Darius Rucker
- 1. Homegrown Honey
- 2. Radio
- 3. Southern State of Mind
- 4. Don't Think I Don't Think About It
- 5. For the First Time
- 6. Same Beer, Different Problem
- 7. Come Back Song
- 8. Sara
- 9. History in the Making
- 10. Let Her Cry
- 11. Beers and Sunshine
- 12. Alright
- 13. Family Tradition (Hank Williams Jr cover) with Brett Young and Scotty McCreery
- 14. If I Told You
- 15. Hold My Hand
- 16. All I Want
- 17. Only Wanna Be with You
- 18. This
- 19. Valerie (The Zutons cover)
- 20. Hands on Me
- 21. Wagon Wheel (Old Crow Medicine Show cover)
Hailey Whitters
- 1. Fillin' My Cup
- 2. Everything She Ain't
- 3. Ten Year Town
- 4. The Neon
- 5. How Far Can It Go?/She's in Love with the Boy (Trisha Yearwood cover)
- 6. Janice at the Hotel Bar
- 7. Boys Back Home
- 8. Heartland
Flatland Cavalry
- 1. Some Things Never Change
- 2. A Cowboy Knows How
- 3. One I Want
- 4. No Ace in the Hole
- 5. Old School
- 6. Country Is...
- 7. A Life Where We Work Out with Kaitlin Butts
- 8. Take Me Home, Country Roads (John Denver cover)
- 9. No Shade of Green
- 19. Dueling Banjos
- 11. Stompin' Grounds
Ashley McBryde
- 1. Martha Divine
- 2. Radioland
- 3. Hang in There Girl
- 4. El Dorado
- 5. Women Ain't Whiskey
- 6. Girl Goin' Nowhere
- 7. Never Wanted to Be That Girl
- 8. Never Will
- 9. Shut Up Shiela
- 10. Voodoo Doll
- 11. A Little Dive Bar in Dahlonega
- 12. Livin' Next to Leroy
- 13. Midnight Rider (The Allman Brothers Band cover)
- 14. Tired of Being Happy
- 15. Sparrow
- 16. One Night Standards
Luke Combs
- 1. When It Rains It Pours
- 2. 1, 2 Many
- 3. Must've Never Met You
- 4. Cold as You
- 5. Houston, We Got a Problem
- 6. One Number Away
- 7. Refrigerator Door
- 8. The Other Guy
- 9. Doin' This
- 10. Even Though I'm Leaving
- 11. Better Together
- 12. Five Leaf Clover
- 13. Dive (Ed Sheeran cover) with Ed Sheeran
- 14. I Like It, I Love It/It's a Great Day to Be Alive (Tim McGraw/Travis Tritt cover)
- 15. Does to Me
- 16. Lovin' on You
- 17. Brand New Man (Brooks & Dunn cover)
- 18. My Kinda Folk
- 19. Beautiful Crazy
- 20. She Got the Best of Me
- 21. Hurricane
- 22. Forever After All
- 23. Beer Never Broke My Heart

=== London pop-up stages ===
- Alex Hall^{b}
- Avery Anna
- Breland
- Brittney Spencer
- Caitlyn Smith^{b}
- Callie Twisselman
- Callista Clark
- Catherine McGrath
- Danny McMahon
- Eleri Angharad
- Eric & Jensen
- Erin Kinsey
- Essex County
- Everette
- Gary Quinn
- Harleymoon Kemp
- Hayley McKay
- Izzie Walsh
- Jaret Reddick
- Jeannine Barry
- Jess Thristan
- Jess Moskaluke
- Kaitlyn Baker
- Katy Hurt
- Kezia Gill
- King Calaway
- Laci Kaye Booth^{b}
- Laine Hardy
- Laura Oakes
- Lucy Grubb
- Matt Stell
- Morganway
- Pete Gow
- Robyn Ottolini
- Ruthie Collins
- Seaforth
- Shy Carter^{b}
- Tebey^{b}
- The County Affair
- The Shires
- Tenille Arts
- Tim Hicks
- Tim Prottey-Jones
- Tony Arata^{b}
- Twinnie-Lee Moore
- Walker Country

^b Also part of the Bluebird Café at C2C event

== C2C: Country to Country 2023 ==
The 2023 lineup was announced on 17 October 2022 at an official launch event at Bush Hall which featured performances from Ben Earle and Catherine McGrath. On 5 December 2022, Morgan Evans and the Introducing Nashville artists (Tyler Braden, Caylee Hammack and Alana Springsteen) were revealed as the final main stage artists and the London Spotlight Stage artists were also announced. The rest of the lineup was revealed on 30 January 2023. The CMA Songwriter's event, which took place on 9 March, featured Nate Smith, Lainey Wilson and Dalton Dover. Elvie Shane was originally scheduled to appear at the festival but was unable to attend due to a broken leg. Niall Horan made a guest appearance at the London show.

London – 10 March Glasgow – 11 March Dublin – 12 March	Dublin – 10 March London – 11 March Glasgow – 12 March	Glasgow – 10 March Dublin – 11 March London – 12 March
Main Stage
**Thomas Rhett**; Jordan Davis; Lainey Wilson; Tyler Braden, Caylee Hammack and Alana Springsteen; Breland (London only)	**Lady A**; Midland; Morgan Evans; Matt Stell	**Zac Brown Band**; Old Crow Medicine Show; Mitchell Tenpenny; Lindsay Ell
London Spotlight Stage
Ashley Cooke; MacKenzie Porter; Corey Kent	Drake Milligan; Sam Williams; Randall King	Amanda Shires; Kameron Marlowe; Madeline Edwards
Glasgow Spotlight Stage
Ashley Cooke; MacKenzie Porter	Drake Milligan; Sam Williams	Kameron Marlowe; Kezia Gill
London BBC Radio 2 Stage – Indigo
Nate Smith; Ashley Cooke; Drake Milligan; MacKenzie Porter	Ward Thomas; Corey Kent; Megan McKenna; Madeline Edwards; Jillian Jacqueline; Sam Williams; Pillbox Patti	Alexandra Kay; Willie Jones; Kezia Gill; Amanda Shires; Kameron Marlowe; Caroline Jones; 49 Winchester

- Headline acts in **bold**, Satellite stage acts in italics
Main Stage Set Lists
Breland
- 1. Natural
- 2. Beers on Me
- 3. For What It's Worth
- 4. Cross Country
- 5. Throw It Back
- 6. Praise the Lord
Introducing Nashville
- 1. Family Tree
- 2. Neon Grave
- 3. Cold Shoulder
- 4. All or Nothing
- 5. Friends
- 6. Twenty Something
- 7. Only Good Things
- 8. Try Losing One
- 9. You Don't Deserve a Country Song
Lainey Wilson
- 1. LA
- 2. Rock and Roll, Hoochie Koo (Rick Derringer cover)
- 3. Smell Like Smoke
- 4. Watermelon Moonshine
- 5. Hold My Halo
- 6. Mr. Big Stuff (Jean Knight cover)
- 7. Wildflowers and Wild Horses
- 8. Wait in the Truck/Heart Like a Truck
- 9. Rolling Stone
- 10. What's Up? (4 Non Blondes cover)
- 11. Things a Man Oughta Know
Jordan Davis
- 1. What My World Spins Around
- 2. Singles You Up
- 3. Damn Good Time
- 4. Slow Dance in a Parking Lot
- 5. One Beer in Front of the Other
- 6. Next Thing You Know
- 7. Lose You
- 8. Almost Maybes
- 9. Detours/Fix You (Coldplay cover)
- 10. No Time Soon
- 11. Money Isn't Real
- 12. Tucson Too Late
- 13. Part of It
- 14. Need to Not
- 15. Take It from Me
- 16. Buy Dirt
Thomas Rhett
- 1. Craving You
- 2. Look What God Gave Her
- 3. Half of Me
- 4. Life Changes
- 5. Slow Down Summer
- 6. Make Me Wanna
- 7. Marry Me
- 8. Get Me Some of That/It Goes Like This
- 9. Vacation
- 10. Paradise
- 11. Slow Hands with Niall Horan
- 12. Beer Can't Fix
- 13. Angels (Don't Always Have Wings)
- 14. She Had Me at Heads Carolina
- 15. Die a Happy Man
- 16. Feeling Country
- 17. Country Again
- 18. Unforgettable
- 19. Sixteen
- 20. Crash and Burn
- 21. T-Shirt
- 22. What's Your Country Song
Matt Stell
- 1. One of Us
- 2. This One's Gonna Hurt
- 3. That Ain't Me No More
- 4. When You Know
- 5. Everywhere but On
- 6. Sadie
- 7. If I Was a Bar
- 8. Boyfriend Season
- 9. The Church on Cumberland Road/All the Small Things/Mr. Brightside (Shenandoah/Blink-182/The Killers covers)
- 10. Prayed for You/Champagne Supernova (Oasis cover)
- 11. Shut the Truck Up
Morgan Evans
- 1. Young Again
- 2. Kiss Somebody
- 3. Sing Along Drink Along
- 4. I Can't Make You Love Me (Bonnie Raitt cover)/Over for You
- 5. Love Is Real
- 6. Things That We Drink To/Fix You (Coldplay cover)
- 7. Hey Little Mama
- 8. Day Drunk/Young, Wild & Free (Snoop Dogg, Wiz Khalifa and Bruno Mars cover)
Midland
- 1. If I Lived Here
- 2. Mr. Lonely
- 3. Out of Sight
- 4. Playboys
- 5. Sunrise Tells the Story
- 6. Much Too Young (To Feel This Damn Old) (Garth Brooks cover)
- 7. Cheatin' Songs
- 8. The Boys Are Back in Town (Thin Lizzy cover)
- 9. Adios Cowboy
- 10. Wichita Lineman (Glen Campbell cover)
- 11. East Bound and Down (Jerry Reed cover)
- 12. Burn Out
- 13. Longneck Way to Go
- 14. Drinkin' Problem
- 15. Fourteen Gears
- 16. Wicked Game (Chris Isaak cover)
Lady A
- 1. We Owned the Night
- 2. Downtown
- 3. What a Song Can Do
- 4. American Honey
- 5. Wanted You More
- 6. Heart Break
- 7. Our Kind of Love
- 8. I Run to You
- 9. Compass
- 10. What If I Never Get Over You
- 11. As Far As You Could
- 12. Help Me Make It Through the Night/Jolene (Kris Kristofferson/Dolly Parton covers)
- 13. If the World Was Ending (Julia Michaels cover)/Just a Kiss
- 14. Champagne Night
- 15. You Look Good
- 16. Bartender
- 17. Love Don't Live Here
- 18. Stop Draggin' My Heart Around (Tom Petty and Stevie Nicks cover)
- 19. Need You Now
Lindsay Ell
- 1. Right on Time
- 2. How Good
- 3. Body Language of a Breakup
- 4. Every Time I Look at You
- 5. Good on You
- 6. Sweet Spot
- 7. Hits Me
- 8. I Don't Love You
- 9. Criminal
Mitchell Tenpenny
- 1. Good Place
- 2. Always Something with You
- 3. Bucket List
- 4. Stand by Me/I'll Be Missing You (Ben E. King/Puff Daddy and Faith Evans covers)
- 5. Sleeping Alone
- 6. At the End of a Bar
- 7. We Got History
- 8. Alcohol You Later
- 9. Truth About You
- 10. Drunk Me
- 11. Best Shot/Iris (Jimmie Allen/Goo Goo Dolls covers)
- 12. Bitches
Old Crow Medicine Show
- 1. Tell It To Me
- 2. Alabama HighTest
- 3. Down Home Girl
- 4. Humdinger
- 5. Tennessee Bound
- 6. Lord Willing and the Creek Don't Rise
- 7. Great Balls of Fire (Jerry Lee Lewis cover)
- 8. Take 'Em Away
- 9. Paint This Town
- 10. Chicken Pie
- 11. 8 Dogs, 8 Banjos
- 12. White Lightning (George Jones cover)
- 13. Honky Tonk Women (Rolling Stones cover)
- 14. Barrett's Privateers (Stan Rogers cover)
- 15. Carry Me Back
- 16. Wagon Wheel
- 17. (You Gotta) Fight for Your Right (To Party!) (Beastie Boys cover)
- 18. Will the Circle Be Unbroken? (Traditional cover)
Zac Brown Band
- 1. Homegrown
- 2. Knee Deep
- 3. Free/Into the Mystic (Van Morrison cover)
- 4. Dancing in the Dark/Sex on Fire (Bruce Springsteen/Kings of Leon covers)
- 5. It's Not OK performed by John Driskell Hopkins
- 6. Toes
- 7. My Old Man
- 8. As She's Walking Away
- 9. Paint It Black (Rolling Stones cover)
- 10. Loving You Easy
- 11. Jump Right In
- 12. Sweet Annie
- 13. Same Boat
- 14. Big Love performed by Caroline Jones (Fleetwood Mac cover) with Lindsay Ell
- 15. Out in the Middle
- 16. Colder Weather/Take It to the Limit (Eagles cover)
- 17. Chicken Fried

=== London pop-up stages ===
- 49 Winchester
- Adam Doleac^{b}
- Alyssa Bonagura^{b}
- Alexandra Kay
- Amanda Shires^{b}
- Ashley Cooke
- Brian Collins
- Brooke Law
- Caroline Jones
- Catie Offerman^{b}
- Chase McDaniel
- Corey Kent
- Dan Davidson
- Drake Milligan^{b}
- Emma Walker
- Eric & Jensen
- First Time Flyers
- George Birge
- Haley Mae Campbell
- Hannah Ellis^{b}
- Jade Helliwell
- Jeff Cohen^{b}
- Jess & The Bandits
- Jillian Jacqueline
- Jolie Harvey
- Jonathan Terrell
- Kameron Marlowe
- Kezia Gill
- Leah Blevins
- Lucy May
- MacKenzie Porter
- Madeleine Edwards^{b}
- Megan McKenna
- Nate Smith
- Paris Adams
- Pillbox Patti
- Randall King^{b}
- Remember Monday
- Sam Williams
- Smithfield
- Thomas Kavanagh
- Tigirlily Gold
- Two Ways Home
- Tyler Booth
- Ward Thomas
- Willie Jones

^b Also part of the Bluebird Café at C2C event

== C2C: Country to Country 2024 ==
The tenth edition of Country to Country was held on 8–10 March 2024. The festival took place in Belfast for the first time this year, after being held in Dublin since 2014, and the festival also returned to Berlin and The Netherlands for the first time since 2019. The main stage acts were announced on 16 October 2023. The CMA Songwriter's event, which took place in March, featured Lauren Alaina, Charlie Worsham, Colbie Caillat, and Stephen Wilson Jr.

Berlin – 2 March Rotterdam – 3 March	Berlin – 3 March Rotterdam – 2 March
**Old Dominion**; Lauren Alaina; Jackson Dean; Drake Milligan; Stephen Wilson Jr.	**Brad Paisley**; Alana Springsteen; Randall King; Conner Smith, Karley Scott Collins, and Lauren Watkins

London – 8 March Belfast– 9 March Glasgow – 10 March	Glasgow – 8 March London – 9 March Belfast – 10 March	Belfast – 8 March Glasgow – 9 March London – 10 March
Main Stage
**Kane Brown**; Carly Pearce; Lauren Alaina; Conner Smith, Karley Scott Collins, and Lauren Watkins	**Brad Paisley**; Jake Owen; Brian Kelley; Priscilla Block	**Old Dominion**; Brothers Osborne; Elle King; Drake Milligan
London Spotlight Stage
Restless Road; Chapel Hart; Fancy Hagood	Mason Ramsey; Colbie Caillat; Tigirlily Gold	Lily Rose; Annie Bosko; Carter Faith
Glasgow Spotlight Stage
Mason Ramsey; Tigirlily Gold	Annie Bosko; Lily Rose	Restless Road; Chapel Hart
London BBC Radio 2 Stage – Indigo
Restless Road; Charlie Worsham; Remember Monday; Colbie Caillat	Brooke Eden; Shane Profitt; Abbey Cone; Carter Faith; Mason Ramsey; Fancy Hagood; Dylan Schneider	Jordan Harvey; Tanner Adell; Tigirlily Gold; Blake Redferrin; Annie Bosko; Rita Wilson; Lily Rose

- Headline acts in **bold**, Satellite stage acts in italics
Main Stage Set Lists
Introducing Nashville
- 1. Stuck In My Ways
- 2. Marlbro Reds
- 3. Take It Slow
- 4. Shirley Temple
- 5. Quit You
- 6. I Hate Alabama
- 7. Anybody But You
- 8. Heavy Metal
- 9. Creek Will Rise
Lauren Alaina
- 1. Georgia Peaches
- 2. Fat Bottomed Girls (Queen cover)
- 3. Smaller the Town
- 4. One Beer
- 5. Getting Over Him
- 6. Ladies in the '90s/I Wanna Dance with Somebody (Whitney Houston cover)
- 7. Getting Good
- 8. Doin' Fine
- 9. Walk in the Bar
- 10. Thicc as Thieves/Country Girl (Shake It for Me) (Luke Bryan cover)
- 11. Road Less Traveled
Carly Pearce
- 1. Next Girl
- 2. Easy Going
- 3. Country Music Made Me Do It
- 4.Should've Known Better
- 5. Let's Go to Vegas (Faith Hill cover)
- 6. Never Wanted to Be That Girl with Hannah Ellis
- 7. Every Little Thing
- 8. We Don't Fight Anymore
- 9. My Place
- 10. Diamondback
- 11. Truck on Fire
- 12. Hide the Wine
- 13. Cowboy Take Me Away (The Chicks cover)
- 14. What He Didn't Do
- 15. I Hope You're Happy Now with Jackson Dean
Kane Brown
- 1. Lose It
- 2. Grand
- 3. Like I Love Country Music
- 4. Famous Friends
- 5. Memory
- 6. Be Like That
- 7. Used to Love You Sober/Homesick
- 9. Heaven
- 10. Bury Me in Georgia
- 11. One Thing Right
- 12. I Can Feel It
- 13. Redneck Woman/Friends in Low Places (Gretchen Wilson/Garth Brooks covers)
- 14. Short Skirt Weather
- 15. What Ifs with Lauren Alaina
- 16. Thank God with Carly Pearce
- 17. One Mississippi with Restless Road
- 18. Good as You
Priscilla Block
- 1. Off the Deep End
- 2. My Bar
- 3. Hey, Jack
- 4. Me Pt.2
- 5. You'll Think of Me (Keith Urban cover)
- 6. Fake Names
- 7. Good on You
- 8. Thick Thighs
- 9. Just About Over You
Brian Kelley
- 1. How We're Livin'
- 2. Acres
- 3. King Ranch
- 4. Ducks, Trucks, Bucks & Beer
- 5. Dirt Cheap
- 6. Burnin' It Down (Jason Aldean cover)
- 7. Kiss My Boots
- 8. Party on the Beach
- 9. Boat Names
- 10. Bare Feet or Boots
- 11. Beach Cowboy
- 12. See You Next Summer
Jake Owen
- 1. The One That Got Away
- 2. Anywhere with You
- 3. Yee Haw
- 4. Days of Gold
- 5. Homemade
- 6. Beachin'
- 7. I Was Jack (You Were Diane)
- 8. Alone with You/Stand by Me (Ben E. King cover)
- 9. Down to the Honkytonk
- 10. On the Boat Again
- 11. CMT
- 12. O.D.'d in Denver (Hank Williams Jr. cover)
- 13. Best Thing Since Backroads
- 14. Eight Second Ride
- 15. Made for You
- 16. American Country Love Song
- 17. Barefoot Blue Jean Night
Brad Paisley
- 1. Southern Comfort Zone
- 2. Wrapped Around
- 3. Ticks
- 4. River Bank
- 5. Perfect Storm
- 6. The Love Boat/Water
- 7. Online
- 8. Waitin' on a Woman
- 9. Then
- 10. Time Warp
- 11. Last Time for Everything/Purple Rain (Prince cover)
- 12. Mountain Music (Alabama cover)/Old Alabama
- 13. I'm Still a Guy
- 14. Same Here
- 15. Take Me Home, Country Roads (John Denver cover)
- 16. Whiskey Lullaby
- 17. This Is Country Music
- 18. Folsom Prison Blues (Johnny Cash cover) with Albert Lee
- 19. American Saturday Night with Albert Lee
- 20. Celebrity
- 21. She's Everything
- 22. I'm Gonna Miss Her (The Fishin' Song)
- 23. Mud on the Tires
- 24. The Mona Lisa
- 25. Alcohol
Drake Milligan
- 1. Blue Suede Shoes (Carl Perkins cover)
- 2. The Fireman (George Strait cover)
- 3. Bad Day to Be a Beer
- 4. Tipping Point
- 5. I Got a Problem
- 6. Hating Everything She Tries On
- 7. Goin' Down Swingin'
- 8. What I Couldn't Forget
- 9. Dance of a Lifetime
- 10. Pretty Woman (Roy Orbison cover)
- 11. Folsom Prison Blues/Get Rhythm (Johnny Cash covers)
- 12. Long Haul
- 13. Kiss Goodbye All Night
- 14. Sounds Like Something I'd Do
Elle King
- 1. Out Yonder
- 2. Chain Smoking, Hard Drinking Woman
- 3. Tulsa
- 4. Jersey Giant
- 5. America's Sweetheart
- 6. Worth a Shot
- 7. Lucky
- 8. Ex's & Oh's
- 9. Stop Draggin' My Heart Around (Tom Petty and Stevie Nicks cover)
- 10. Love Go By
- 11. Drunk (And I Don't Wanna Go Home) with Lily Rose
- 12. Little Bit of Lovin'
Brothers Osborne
- 1. Might as Well Be Me
- 2. Nobody's Nobody
- 3. Shoot Me Straight
- 4. Drank Like Hank
- 5. 21 Summer
- 6. I Don't Remember Me (Before You)
- 7. Weed, Whiskey, and Willie
- 8. I Won't Back Down (Tom Petty cover)
- 9. I'm Not for Everyone
- 10. Stay a Little Longer
- 11. Three Little Birds (Bob Marley cover)/Rum
- 12. Burning Man
- 13. It Ain't My Fault
Old Dominion
- 1. Make It Sweet
- 2. No Hard Feelings
- 3. Never be Sorry
- 4. Break Up with Him
- 5. Midnight Mess Around
- 6. No Such Thing as a Broken Heart
- 7. Can't Break Up Now
- 8. Written in the Sand
- 9. Snapback
- 10. Hotel Key
- 11. Cocaine with Elle King and Brothers Osborne (J. J. Cale cover)
- 12. Memory Lane
- 13. One Man Band
- 14. Song for Another Time
- 15. Save It for a Rainy Day (Kenny Chesney cover)
- 16. My Heart Is a Bar
- 17. Nowhere Fast
- 18. I Was on a Boat That Day

=== London pop-up stages ===
- Abbie Mac
- Abby Cone
- Alana Springsteen
- Angel White
- Annie Bosko
- Ben Chapman^{b}
- Blake O'Connor
- Brad Cox
- Brooke Eden
- Carter Faith^{b}
- Chapel Hart
- Charlie Worsham^{b}
- Chloe Chadwick
- Colbie Caillat
- Dom Ellis
- Drayton Farley^{b}
- Dylan Schneider
- Emilia Quinn
- Fancy Hagood^{b}
- Gasoline & Matches
- Greylan James^{b}
- Halle Kearns
- Hannah Dasher
- Hannah Ellis
- Harper Grace
- Jake Worthington^{b}
- Jeannine Barry
- Jeff Cohen
- Jordan Harvey
- Kerri Watt
- Lakeview
- Lily Rose
- Lola Kirke
- Martin Harley
- Mason Ramsey
- Matt Koziol
- Redferrin
- Remember Monday
- Restless Road
- Rita Wilson^{b}
- Shane Profitt
- Simeon Hammond Dallas
- Sinead Burgess
- Sophia Scott
- Tanner Adell
- Tennessee Twin
- The Redhill Valleys
- Tigirlily Gold
- Zandi Holup^{b}

^b Also part of the Bluebird Café at C2C event

== C2C: Country to Country 2025 ==
The eleventh edition of Country to Country was held on 14–16 March 2025. The line-up was announced on 30 September 2024. The complete London lineup was revealed on 27 February 2025. The CMA Songwriter's event, which took place on 13 March, featured Darius Rucker, Mickey Guyton, Tucker Wetmore, Wyatt Flores, and Jessi Alexander.

Berlin – 7 March	Berlin – 8 March Rotterdam – 9 March	Rotterdam – 8 March Berlin – 9 March
**Dylan Gossett**; 49 Winchester; Wyatt Flores; Sam Barber; The Castellows	**Midland**; Dasha; Tucker Wetmore; Chase Matthew; Tanner Adell	**Lainey Wilson**; Nate Smith; Shaboozey; Chayce Beckham; Avery Anna

London – 14 March Belfast– 15 March Glasgow – 16 March	Glasgow – 14 March London – 15 March Belfast – 16 March	Belfast – 14 March Glasgow – 15 March London – 16 March
Main Stage
**Lainey Wilson**; Dylan Gossett; 49 Winchester; Tucker Wetmore; Wyatt Flores	**Dierks Bentley**; Tyler Hubbard; Chayce Beckham; Niko Moon; Tanner Adell	**Cody Johnson**; Nate Smith; Shaboozey; Avery Anna; The Castellows
London Spotlight Stage
Willow Avalon; Max McNown; Bayker Blankenship	Drew Baldridge; Kaitlin Butts; Kezia Gill	Kassi Ashton; Kashus Culpepper; Harper O'Neill
Glasgow Spotlight Stage
Drew Baldridge; Kezia Gill	Kassi Ashton; Harper O'Neill	Willow Avalon; Bayker Blankenship
London BBC Radio 2 Stage – Indigo
Meghan Patrick; Maggie Antone; Willow Avalon; Bayker Blankenship	First Time Flyers; Jake Vaadeland; Mackenzie Carpenter; Max McNown; Kashus Culpepper; Kaitlin Butts; Kezia Gill	Alyssa Bonagura; Gareth; Harper O'Neill; Adrien Nunez; Kassi Ashton; Drew Baldridge; Abby Anderson

- Headline acts in **bold**, Satellite stage acts in italics
Main Stage Set Lists
Wyatt Flores
- 1. Orange Bottles
- 2. Losing Sleep
- 3. Milwaukee
- 4. Please Don't Go
- 5. Oh Susannah
- 6. West of Tulsa
Tucker Wetmore
- 1. What Would You Do?
- 2. Silverado Blue
- 3. Break First
- 4. 3, 2, 1
- 5. Bad Luck Looks Good On Me
- 6. Wine into Whiskey
- 7. Unreleased song
- 8. Wind Up Missin' You
49 Winchester
- 1. Tulsa
- 2. Yearnin' For You
- 3. Miles to Go
- 4. Everlasting Lover
- 5. Long Hard Life
- 6. The Wind
- 7. Russell County Line
- 8. Leavin' This Holler with Maggie Antone
- 9. Hillbilly Happy
Dylan Gossett
- 1. Lone Ole Cowboy
- 2. To Be Free
- 3. If I Had a Lover
- 4. No Better Time
- 5. Beneath Oak Trees
- 6. Hangin' On / Folsom Prison Blues (Johnny Cash cover)
- 7. Tree Birds
- 8. Finally Stop Dreaming
- 9. Coal
- 10. Somewhere Between
Lainey Wilson
- 1. Hang Tight Honey
- 2. Smell Like Smoke
- 3. Dirty Looks
- 4. Good Horses
- 5. Things a Man Oughta Know
- 6. Middle of It
- 7. Whirlwind
- 8. Heart Like a Truck
- 9. Bar in Baton Rouge / Proud Mary (Creedence Clearwater Revival cover)
- 10. Ring Finger
- 11. Atta Girl
- 12. Watermelon Moonshine
- 13. Keep Up With Jones
- 14. Country's Cool Again
- 15. Come Together (The Beatles cover)
- 16. 4x4xU
- 17. Wildflowers and Wild Horses
Tanner Adell
- 1. Do-Si-Don'tcha
- 2. Tan Lines
- 3. Buckle Bunny
- 4. Love You a Little Bit
- 5. Cowboy Break My Heart
- 6. Throw It Back
- 7. Nothin' Like Me
- 8. Whiskey Blues
- 9. Strawberry Crush
- 10. You Ain't in Love, You're Just Drunk
Niko Moon
- 1. Night's Still Young
- 2. Paradise To Me
- 3. Fishin' in the Dark (Nitty Gritty Dirt Band cover)
- 4. Head Above Water
- 5. Money Can't Buy
- 6. Homegrown (Zac Brown Band cover)
- 7. No Sad Songs
- 8. Good Time
Chayce Beckham
- 1. Waylon in '75
- 2. Keeping Me Up All Night
- 3. This Ol' Rodeo
- 4. Here for a Good Time (George Strait cover)
- 5. Old Fashioned
- 6. Everything I Need
- 7. Devil I've Been
- 8. Drink You Off My Mind
- 9. 23
Tyler Hubbard
- 1. Park
- 2. Night Like That
- 3. Back Then Right Now
- 4. Turn
- 5. Meant to Be
- 6. You Make It Easy (Jason Aldean cover)
- 7. Psycho (Hardy cover)
- 8. Cruise
- 9. 5 Foot 9
- 10. American Mellencamp
- 11. Wish You Would
- 12. Dancin' in the Country
Dierks Bentley
- 1. Gold
- 2. I Hold On
- 3. Am I the Only One / Red Solo Cup (Toby Keith cover)
- 4. Living
- 5. Burning Man
- 6. American Girl (Tom Petty cover)
- 7. Free and Easy (Down the Road I Go) / Mountain Music (Alabama cover)
- 8. Gone
- 9. Up on the Ridge
- 10. Callin' Baton Rouge / Freeborn Man (Garth Brooks/Keith Allison covers) performed by Charlie Worsham and Ben Helson
- 11. 5-1-5-0
- 12. What Was I Thinkin'
- 13. Drunk on a Plane
- 14. T-R-O-U-B-L-E / I Like It, I Love It / Meet in the Middle / Heads Carolina, Tails California / Achy Breaky Heart / Man! I Feel Like a Woman! / Friends in Low Places (Hot Country Knights 90's medley)
The Castellows
- 1. Ways to Go
- 2. Cowboy Kind of Love
- 3. Sober Sundays
- 4. Come Together (The Beatles cover)
- 5. You Don't Even Know Who I Am (Patty Loveless cover)
- 6. Hurricane (Leon Everette cover)
Avery Anna
- 1. Blame It on My Broken Heart
- 2. Crazy (Patsy Cline cover)
- 3. Mr. Predictable
- 4. Indigo
- 5. Grave
- 6. It's Just Rainin'
- 7. Narcissist
- 8. Make It Look Easy
Shaboozey
- 1. Last of My Kind
- 2. Tall Boy
- 3. Anabelle
- 4. Vegas
- 5. Drink Don't Need No Mix
- 6. Highway
- 7. Good News
- 8. Let It Burn
- 9. A Bar Song (Tipsy)
Nate Smith
- 1. What Alone Looks Like
- 2. Whiskey on You
- 3. Wish I Never Felt
- 4. Nobody Likes Your Girlfriend
- 5. Sleeve
- 6. She's Country (Jason Aldean cover)
- 7. Bulletproof
- 8. Fix What You Didn't Break
- 9. Chasing Cars (Snow Patrol cover)
- 10. World on Fire
Cody Johnson
- 1. That's Texas
- 2. Me and My Kind
- 3. Dance Her Home
- 4. How Do You Sleep At Night?
- 5. With You I Am
- 6. Dear Rodeo
- 7. Nothin' On You
- 8. Take It Like a Man
- 9. Human
- 10. Georgia Peaches
- 11. The Fall
- 12. People in the Back
- 13. I'm Gonna Love You
- 14. Long Haired Country Boy (Charlie Daniels cover)
- 15. Dirt Cheap
- 16. The Painter
- 17. 'Til You Can't
- 18. Travelin' Soldier (The Chicks cover)
- 19. Diamond in My Pocket

=== London pop-up stages ===
- Abbie Mac
- Abby Anderson^{b}
- Adrien Nunez
- Alli Walker
- Alyssa Bonagura^{b}
- Bayker Blankenship
- Caleb Lee Hutchinson
- Callie Twisselman
- Cece
- Chanel Yates
- Charlie Worsham^{b}
- Cory Marks
- Danko
- Dom Ellis
- Drew Baldridge
- Eleri
- Evan Bartels
- First Time Flyers
- Gareth
- Gina Larner
- Graham Barham
- Harper O'Neill
- Jack Browning
- Jade Helliwell
- Jake O'Neill
- Jake Vaadeland
- Janet Devlin
- Jeorgia Rose
- Jess and the Bandits
- Kaitlin Butts^{b}
- Kashus Culpepper^{b}
- Kassi Ashton
- Katie Rigby
- Kellie Loder
- Kezia Gill
- Lanie Gardner^{b}
- Luke Borchelt^{b}
- Mackenzie Carpenter
- Maggie Antone
- Maria Byrne
- Max McNown
- Meghan Patrick
- Mickey Guyton^{b}
- Nathan Leazer
- Pip Marsh
- Robyn Red
- Tayler Holder
- Travis Bolt
- Tyler Halverson^{b}
- Willow Avalon
- Wood Burnt Red
- Zach John King^{b}
- Zach Meadows

^b Also part of the Bluebird Café at C2C event

== C2C: Country to Country 2026 ==
The twelfth edition of Country to Country was held on 13–15 March 2026. The main stage line-up was announced on 22 September 2025. Ty Myers was added to the line-up on 31 October 2025 alongside the reveal of the Spotlight Stage artists. The London pop-up stage line-up was revealed on 6 February 2025. The CMA Songwriter's event, which took place on 12 March, featured Keith Urban, Kristian Bush, Aaron Raitiere, Ashley Cooke, and Meg McRee.

London – 13 March Belfast– 14 March Glasgow – 15 March	Glasgow – 13 March London – 14 March Belfast – 15 March	Belfast – 13 March Glasgow – 14 March London – 15 March
Main Stage
Zach Top; Scotty McCreery; Ty Myers; Waylon Wyatt; Noeline Hofmann	Keith Urban; Russell Dickerson; Tyler Braden; Alana Springsteen; Bayker Blankenship	Brooks & Dunn; Drake Milligan; Kameron Marlowe; Ashley Cooke; MacKenzie Carpenter
London Spotlight Stage
Noah Rinker; Emily Ann Roberts; Crowe Boys	Julia Cole; John Morgan; Dylan Schneider	Elizabeth Nichols; Mae Estes; Jack Wharff Band
Glasgow Spotlight Stage
Julia Cole; John Morgan	Elizabeth Nichols; Mae Estes	Noah Rinker; Emily Ann Roberts
London BBC Radio 2 Stage – Indigo
Annie Bosko; McCoy Moore; Emily Ann Roberts; Noah Rinker	Olivia Lynn; Hannah McFarland; Dylan Schneider; Crowe Boys; Jack Wharff Band; John Morgan; Julia Cole	Motel Sundown; Austin Williams; Elizabeth Nichols; Kruse Brothers; Ashland Craft; Jade Bird; Mae Estes

Main Stage Set Lists
Noeline Hofmann
- 1. Lightning in July (Prairie Fire)
- 2. Rodeo Junkies
- 3. August
- 4. Purple Gas
- 5. Dublin Blues (Guy Clark cover)
Waylon Wyatt
- 1. Pretty Little Liar
- 2. In Loving Melody
- 3. Dead Man Walking
- 4. Arkansas Diamond
- 5. O.D.
- 6. Jailbreak
- 7. Smoke and Embers
- 8. Everything Under the Sun
Ty Myers
- 1. Can't Hold Me Down
- 2. Me Neither
- 3. Valerie (The Zutons cover)
- 4. Through a Screen
- 5. Thought It Was Love
- 6. Ends of the Earth
- 7. Drinkin' Alone
Scotty McCreery
- 1. You Time
- 2. Can't Pass the Bar
- 3. It Matters to Her
- 4. Cab in a Solo
- 5. This Is It
- 6. Damn Strait
- 7. Forever and Ever, Amen/Folsom Prison Blues/Chattahoochee/Sold (The Grundy County Auction Incident)/Ain't Goin' Down ('Til the Sun Comes Up) (Randy Travis/Johnny Cash/Alan Jackson/John Michael Montgomery/Garth Brooks covers)
- 8. Five More Minutes
- 9. Bottle Rockets with Darius Rucker
- 10. Wagon Wheel (Old Crow Medicine Show cover) with Darius Rucker
Zach Top
- 1.Guitar
- 2. Sounds Like the Radio
- 3. When You See Me
- 4. Two Dozen Roses (Shenandoah cover)
- 5. Between the Ditches
- 6. She Makes
- 7. Bad Luck
- 8. I Know a Place
- 9. Modern Day Bonnie and Clyde (Travis Tritt cover)
- 10. Lonely for Long
- 11. South of Sanity
- 12. Good Times & Tan Lines
- 13. In a World Gone Wrong
- 14. Freeborn Man (Keith Allison cover)
- 15. There's the Sun
- 16. The Kinda Woman I Like
- 17. Dirt Turns to Gold
- 18. Justa Jonesin'
- 19. Slow Hand (Conway Twitty cover)
- 20. Use Me
- 21. I Never Lie
- 22. Things To Do
- 23. Cold Beer & Country Music
Bayker Blankenship
- 1. Lost Time
- 2. 300 Miles
- 3. Thinking of Me
- 4. Jailbreak
- 5. Pickup Man (Joe Diffie cover)
- 6. Maxed Out
Alana Springsteen
- 1. You Don't Deserve a Country Song
- 2. Look I Like
- 3. Ghost in My Guitar
- 4. Same God
- 5. Before He Cheats (Carrie Underwood cover)
- 6. Cowboys and Tequila
- 7. Goodbye Looks Good on You
Tyler Braden
- 1. How It Starts
- 2. Thank Me for That
- 3. Might Be Dangerous
- 4. More Than a Prayer
- 5. Everybody Talks (Neon Trees cover)
- 6. Evergreen
- 7. God & Guns N' Roses
- 8. Dry County
- 9. The Devil Went Down to Georgia (Charlie Daniels Band cover)
- 10. Devil You Know
Russell Dickerson
- 1. Worth Your Wild
- 2. It's About Time
- 3. Home Sweet
- 4. She Likes It
- 5. Bones
- 6. Love You Like I Used To
- 7. Blue Tacoma
- 8. Every Little Thing
- 9. Love That I Love You
- 10. MGNO
- 11. Yours
- 12. Happen to Me
Keith Urban
- 1. Where the Blacktop Ends
- 2. Wildside
- 3. Long Hot Summer
- 4. Heart Like a Hometown
- 5. Straight Line
- 6. Days Go By
- 7. Somewhere in My Car
- 8. Go Home W U with Natalie Stovall
- 9. The Fighter with Natalie Stovall
- 10. Somebody Like You
- 11. One Too Many
- 12. Somewhere Only We Know (Keane cover)
- 13. You'll Think of Me
- 14. You Get What You Give (New Radicals cover)
- 15. Blue Ain't Your Color
- 16. Wasted Time
Mackenzie Carpenter
- 1. Dozen Red Flags
- 2. All In Already
- 3. Man I Need )Olivia Dean cover)
- 4. Only Girl
- 5. Drunk Cigs
- 6. I Wish You Would
Ashley Cooke
- 1. Excuses
- 2. I Almost Do
- 3. Xs
- 4. The Hell You Are
- 5. It's Been a Year
- 6. Summer Nights (Rascal Flatts cover)
- 7. Baby Blues
- 8. Your Place
Kameron Marlowe
- 1. Tennessee Don't Mind
- 2. Over Now
- 3. 911
- 4. Sober As a Drunk
- 5. Giving You Up
- 6. Lose Control (Teddy Swims cover)
- 7. Fire On the Hillside
- 8. No Need for Leavin'
- 9. Burn 'Em All
- 10. Girl on Fire
- 11. Strangers with Ashley Cooke
Drake Milligan
- 1. Sounds Like Something I'd Do
- 2. Bad Way to Be a Beer
- 3. Cryin' Shoulder
- 4. Tipping Point
- 5. Over Drinkin' Under Thinkin'
- 6. I Got a Problem
- 7. Hating Everything She Tries On
- 8. Slow Dancin' to a Fast Song
- 9. How Much Beer
- 10. What I Couldn't Forget
- 11. Tumbleweed
- 12. Burning Love (Elvis Presley cover)
- 13. Long Haul
- 14. Kiss Goodbye All Night
Brooks & Dunn
- 1. Brand New Man
- 2. My Next Broken Heart
- 3. You're Gonna Miss Me When I'm Gone
- 4. Mama Don't Get Dressed Up for Nothing
- 5. We'll Burn That Bridge
- 6. She's Not the Cheatin' Kind
- 7. Ain't Nothing 'bout You
- 8. Red Dirt Road
- 9. Lost and Found
- 10. Play Something Country
- 11. Cowgirls Don't Cry
- 12. Rock My World (Little Country Girl)
- 13. Hard Workin' Man
- 14. Neon Moon with Darius Rucker
- 15. My Maria
- 16. Boot Scootin' Boogie

=== London pop-up stages ===
- Aaron Raitiere^{b}
- Alyssa Flaherty
- Annie Bosko
- Ashland Craft
- Austin Williams
- Benny G
- Blake Proehl
- Brad Cox
- Chanel Yates
- Crowe Boys
- Dylan Schneider
- Elizaeth Nichols
- Emily Ann Roberts^{b}
- Fanny Lumsden
- Georgia Ku
- Hannah Jane Lewis
- Hannah McFarland
- Jade Bird^{b}
- Jeff Cohen^{b}
- John Morgan
- Jonny Morgan
- Julia Cole
- Just Jayne
- Liam St. John^{b}
- Mae Estes^{b}
- Max Alan
- Max Jackson
- Maya Lane
- McCoy Moore^{b}
- Meg McRee^{b}
- Motel Sundown
- Noah James
- Noah Rinker
- Olivia Lynn
- The Jack Wharff Band
- The Kruse Brothers
- Tyce Delk^{b}
- Tyla Rodrigues

^b Also part of the Bluebird Café at C2C event

== C2C: Country to Country 2027 ==
The thirteenth edition of Country to Country will be held on 12-14 March 2027. For the first time, the event will be held at the AO Arena in Manchester alongside The O2 in London and the Hydro in Glasgow. The main stage line-up was announced on 28 September 2026. For the first time, the Spotlight Stage artists would perform at all three venues, rotating with the rest of the main stage.

Rotterdam – 5 March Berlin – 6 March	Rotterdam – 6 March Berlin – 7 March
Main Stage
Ashley McBryde; Cooper Alan; Carter Faith; Blake Whiten; Mack Geiger	Jelly Roll; Dasha; Emily Ann Roberts; Drew Baldridge; Kashus Culpepper
CMA Spotlight Stage
Bec O'Malley; Belles Late Night Thoughts Owen Riegling	Chandler Walters; Colin Lynch; Greylan James Laci Kaye Booth

London – 12 March Manchester 13 March Glasgow – 14 March	Glasgow – 12 March London – 13 March Manchester – 13 March	Manchester – 12 March Glasgow – 13 March London – 14 March
Main Stage
Ashley McBryde; Cooper Alan; Jackson Dean; Carter Faith; Blake Whiten	Riley Green; Midland; Dasha; Emily Ann Roberts; Mack Geiger	Jelly Roll; Cole Swindell; Chase Matthew; Kashus Culpepper; Laci Kaye Booth
Spotlight Stage
Late Night Thoughts; Colin Lynch; Chandler Walters	Benny G Owen Riegling; Jason Scott & The High Heat	Greylan James; Lanie Gardner; Belles
London BBC Radio 2 Stage – Indigo

== See also ==
- List of country music festivals
- List of folk festivals
