= Tumbleweed (album) =

Studio album by Drake Milligan
- Released: November 7, 2025
- Genre: Neotraditional country; Texas country
- Length: 42:58
- Label: Stoney Creek Records
- Producer: Trent Willmon

Drake Milligan chronology
Dallas/Fort Worth (2022)	Tumbleweed (2025)

Singles from Tumbleweed
- 1. "Tumbleweed" Released: September 19, 2025; 2. "Old Flames, Old Whiskey" Released: October 17, 2025

Tumbleweed is the second studio album by American country music singer–songwriter Drake Milligan. It was released on November 7, 2025, via the BBR Music Group. Milligan co-wrote eleven of the album's 14 tracks and it was produced by Trent Willmon. It includes the singles "Tumbleweed" and "Old Flames, Old Whiskey". The album was influenced and inspired by Milligan's time touring, capturing his life on the road between 2022 and 2025, and playing over 300 shows.

== Background ==
Milligan signed to BBR Music Group after moving to Nashville, Tennessee following a decision to drop out of American Idol in 2018. His self-titled debut extended play was released on July 23, 2021. In 2022, he gained popularity with a wider audience when he and his band appeared as contestants on the seventeenth season of America's Got Talent, where he ultimately finished in third place. He released his debut studio album, Dallas/Fort Worth on September 15, 2022, a day after the show's finale. On July 28, 2023, he released "Honky Tonkin' About", a collaborative single with Canadian duo The Reklaws, which went on to become his first number one. He followed this up with extended play Jukebox Songs in February 2024 and promoted his music through touring in both the United States and internationally.

"Tumbleweed", which would go on to become the title track of the album, was released on September 19, 2025. Milligan handpicked the song for the album because he related to its themes of travelling while having those at home to ground you.

The album was officially announced on October 17, 2025, alongside the release of the project's second single, "Old Flames, New Whiskey". Of the song, which tells a story of heartbreak and regret, Milligan stated “by the end of the song, I knew exactly where I wanted to go with it. I could see us playing this at Billy Bob’s, and everybody’s singing along. It harks back to that really traditional honky-tonk sound that was so popular in the nineties.”

== Promotion ==
Milligan will promote the album on the Tumbleweed World Tour, which began on November 11, 2025, with a headlining show and album release party at Nashville's Brooklyn Bowl, and will run until August 29, 2026, including international dates in Paris and Brussels, plus shows in Rotterdam, Berlin, Belfast, Glasgow, and London as part of the C2C: Country to Country festival. He performed the album's title track on Fox & Friends on October 30, 2025.

== Track listing ==
Tumbleweed track listing
No.	Title	Writer(s)	Length
1.	"Cryin' Shoulder"	Brandon Hood; Terry McBride; Drake Milligan	2:06
2.	"Hearts Together"	Milligan; Jim Beavers	2:53
3.	"Tumbleweed"	Ian Christian; Cam Newby; Bobby Pinson	3:05
4.	"Turn It Off"	Bryan Fuller; Jeb Gipson; Matt Warren	3:22
5.	"Like the Moon"	Milligan; Chris DuBois; Thomas Karlas	3:20
6.	"Good as Gone"	Milligan; Hood; Monty Criswell	3:14
7.	"Slow Dancing to a Fast Song"	Milligan; Marv Green; Tim Nichols	3:00
8.	"Old Flames, Old Whiskey"	Brett Beavers; J. Beavers	2:41
9.	"Girl Like You"	Milligan; Phil O'Donnell	2:56
10.	"Hard Headed Cowboy"	Milligan; Aaron Eshuis; Neil Medley	3:15
11.	"Lonely:30"	Milligan; Hood; O'Donnell	2:32
12.	"Goodbye Ain't All That Bad"	Milligan; Brice Long	3:02
13.	"Talk Texas"	Milligan; J. Beavers	2:53
14.	"How Much Beer" (featuring Randall King)	Milligan; Luke Laird; Long	4:34
Total length:			42:58

== Charts ==
Chart performance for Tumbleweed
Chart (2025–2026)	Peak position
Scottish Albums (OCC)	40
UK Albums Sales (OCC)	57
UK Country Albums (OCC)	1
UK Independent Albums (OCC)	23
