= Kaitlin Butts =

- Born: Tulsa, Oklahoma, U.S.
- Genres: Country; pop
- Occupation: Singer-songwriter
- Instruments: Vocals, guitar
- Years active: 2011–present
- Label: Republic
- Website: kaitlinbutts.com

Kaitlin Butts is an American country music singer-songwriter based in Nashville, Tennessee. She has released four studio albums: Same Hell, Different Devil (2015), What Else Can She Do (2022), Roadrunner! (2024) and Hello, Honky Tonk (2026).

== Early life and education ==
Butts was born and raised in Tulsa, Oklahoma. She started singing when she was five years old, and did local musical theater growing up. She has said she was inspired to learn to play the guitar after listening to The Chicks and Shania Twain.

She graduated from Union High School in Tulsa in 2011, and earned an associate degree from the Academy of Contemporary Music at the University of Central Oklahoma, where she was the only country music-focused artist in her class.

== Career ==
Starting out in the red dirt music scene, Butts released her first studio album, Same Hell, Different Devil, in February 2015. Her second studio album, What Else Can She Do, was released on Soundly Music on April 15, 2022. She released her first EP on November 4, 2022, the covers collection Sad Yeehaw Sessions.

Her third studio album, Roadrunner! was released on Republic Records on June 28, 2024, and was inspired by the Broadway musical Oklahoma! The album includes guest vocals from Vince Gill on "Come Rest Your Head (On My Pillow)", songwriting from Natalie Hemby, Angaleena Presley and Courtney Patton, and covers of the 2017 Kesha song "Hunt You Down" and Cher's 1966 single "Bang Bang (My Baby Shot Me Down)". Rolling Stone named it the fourth-best country and Americana album of 2024. Butts won a 2024 Ameripolitan Award for Best Honky Tonk Female, and was a member of the Grand Ole Opry's Opry NextStage class of 2025.

On October 30, 2025, it was reported that Butts had signed with Republic Records. This followed the viral success on TikTok of "You Ain't Gotta Die (to Be Dead to Me)" from Roadrunner! The song was featured on an episode of the Paramount+ series Landman, and debuted at number 59 on the Billboard Country Airplay chart in 2025, more than a year after it was released. On November 14, 2025, Yeehaw Sessions was released on Republic Records, Butts' first release on the label. The five-song EP includes cover versions of Jimmy Eat World's "The Middle", Chappell Roan's "Red Wine Supernova", Don Williams' "Tulsa Time" and the Chicks' "Sin Wagon", and a new recording of "You Ain't Gotta Die (to Be Dead to Me)".

Butts is featured in a duet with Willow Avalon on the 2026 single "Hypothetically Speaking" off of Avalon's album Pink Pocket Pistol. She has a cameoed in the music video for Ella Langley's 2025 single "Choosin' Texas". as well as the music video for Dasha's song "Mad About It". Her fourth studio album, Hello, Honky Tonk is set for release on October 30, 2026.

== Performances ==
Butts performed at Lollapalooza on August 4, 2024, and toured the UK later that month. She opened for Lainey Wilson on her 2025 Whirlwind World Tour in the US, Canada, and Australia. In 2025, Butts headlined her first US tour, and opened for Dierks Bentley, Brothers Osborne, and Flatland Cavalry. In 2026, she headlined an international tour, the European Cowgirl Experience.

== Personal life ==
Butts is married to Cleto Cordero, lead vocalist of the country and Americana band Flatland Cavalry. They met after recording the 2016 duet "A Life Where We Work Out" together. They have lived in Nashville since 2019, and were married in 2020.

== Discography ==
=== Albums ===
| Title | Album details |
|---|---|
| Same Hell, Different Devil | Released: February 27, 2015; Label: Self-released; Formats: CD, digital download, streaming |
| What Else Can She Do | Released: April 15, 2022; Label: Soundly Music; Formats: LP, CD, digital download, streaming |
| Roadrunner! | Released: June 28, 2024; Label: Republic Records; Formats: LP, CD, digital download, streaming |
| Hello, Honky Tonk | Released: October 30, 2026; Label: Republic Records; Formats: LP, CD, digital download, streaming |

=== EPs ===
| Title | Album details |
|---|---|
| Sad Yeehaw Sessions | Released: November 4, 2022; Label: Soundly Music; Formats: Digital download, streaming |
| Yeehaw Sessions | Released: November 14, 2025; Label: Republic Records; Formats: LP, digital download, streaming |

=== Singles ===
- "White River" (2019)
- "How Lucky Am I" (2021)
- "Marfa Lights" (2021)
- "Blood" (2022)
- "It Won't Always Be This Way" (2022)
- "Tomorrow Will Be Kinder" (2023)
- "Hunt You Down" (2024)
- "Roadrunner" (2024)
- "Come Rest Your Head (On My Pillow)" feat. Vince Gill (2024)
- "The Middle" (2025)

=== As featured artist ===
- "A Life Where We Work Out" - with Flatland Cavalry (2016)
- "That Don't Impress Me Much" - with Disko Cowboy and French Horn Rebellion (2024)
- "Vegas" - with Midland (2024)
- "Cerulean Skies" - with Telander (2025)
- "Might Be Dangerous" - with Tyler Braden (2025)
- "Hypothetically Speaking" - with Willow Avalon (2026)
