= Kerri Watt =

Scottish singer-songwriter (born 1991)

- Born: 22 August 1991 (age 35); Milngavie, Dunbartonshire, Scotland
- Occupations: Singer; songwriter; multi-instrumentalist
- Musical career
- Genres: Pop; Country
- Years active: 2015–present
- Label: Cooking Vinyl

Kerri Watt (born 22 August 1991) is a Scottish singer, songwriter, and multi-instrumentalist from Glasgow. She signed with the record label Cooking Vinyl in 2019, following after several independent single releases by herself.

Watt's debut album Neptune's Daughter was released in 2021. She has performed as a supporting act for several artists, including Coldplay on their A Head Full of Dreams Tour in 2017.

== Early life ==
Watt was born and raised in Milngavie, a small town near Glasgow, Scotland. At the age of 16, she was accepted into the South Orange County School of Arts in Orange County and relocated to Dana Point. After a year of study in the United States, she returned to London to train at Laine Theatre Arts.

In 2008 and 2009, Watt was an understudy for the role of Cinderella, performing alongside Steve Guttenberg in a two-month engagement at the Churchill Theatre in Bromley. Additionally, she participated in Bill Kenwright's production of Jekyll and Hyde, touring the United Kingdom in 2011 with Marti Pellow. After her time in theatre, Watt transitioned professionally into music.

== Career ==
Watt's single, "Long Way Home", was playlisted on Radio 2's A-List. She performed the song on ITV's Weekend with Aled Jones on 27 June 2015.

In 2015, Watt also released a remix of her song "You", produced by Oliver Nelson. The song received millions of plays between SoundCloud and YouTube and reached number 1 on Hype Machine. In March 2016, Watt released the single "The Wild", which was added to the BBC Radio 2 B Playlist for a month. While promoting the single, she toured the UK, visiting over 20 radio stations, and made a live appearance on STV's Live at Five in Glasgow on 22 March 2016.

In 2015 and 2016, Watt toured the UK and Europe supporting acts such as Mike and the Mechanics, Ward Thomas, Nina Nesbitt, The Overtones and Starsailor. Watt also played festivals including Isle of Wight, Glastonbury Festival, Secret Garden Party, and Boardmasters.

On 11 and 12 July 2017, Watt joined Embrace on stage at the Millennium Stadium to open for Coldplay on their A Head Full of Dreams Tour. Watt collaborated with Embrace, and "Never" was released as the lead single from the band's album Love Is a Basic Need the following year, and was added to the BBC Radio 2 C-list.

In 2018, Watt shifted focus to writing and recording material in Austin, Texas, with Metal producer 'Machine' (Lamb of God/Clutch). Watt spent the remainder of 2018 performing her new music around the UK at various festivals, including C2C and Country Music Week, and supported artists on tour, including David Ramirez, Curse of Lono, and Tom Speight.

At the start of 2019, Watt signed an album and a publishing deal with record label Cooking Vinyl. On 1 July Watt announced that her first single with Cooking Vinyl, "Cut Me Loose", would be released on 12 July. The song was featured on the BBC's televised footage of the Wimbledon Men's Final and made several appearances in episodes of the British soap opera EastEnders. The song was also featured in Call of Duty: Mobile for the Christmas season of 2020. Additionally, she released the single "Chasing Aeroplanes" on 1 November. It premiered on Bob Harris's Radio 2 Country Show. In 2019, Watt supported several artists, including Keith Urban in London, where she joined him on stage to sing Carrie Underwood's vocal parts from his 2016 hit single "The Fighter", as well as making guest appearances for Julio Iglesias at The Royal Albert Hall, Rick Astley at Kew The Music, and Joe Jackson at The Palladium. Watt performed solo and full band shows at Glastonbury Festival, C2C, British Summer Time alongside Celine Dion, and Cambridge Folk Festival, and was the special guest performer at BBC Radio Scotland's inaugural Singer-Songwriter Awards 2019.

The beginning of 2020 saw Watt continue with live shows throughout the UK. In January, she performed at Celtic Connections in Glasgow and as a headliner at the AMAUK Showcase in London, before performing over 30 live streams throughout the Spring. Also in January, Watt performed an acoustic version of "Psychotic Girl" by The Black Keys for The Mahogany Sessions - Covers.

Watt released her third single "Kissing Fools" on 14 February 2020. In March, Watt recorded an acoustic version of the song for Under The Apple Tree Sessions at Bob Harris' home studio. In April Watt released an acoustic version of her 2019 single "Cut Me Loose" featuring London singer-songwriter, Samuel Jack.

On 15 January 2021, Watt released her debut album Neptune's Daughter with Cooking Vinyl. It was released three years after the recording stage, partly due to the Covid-19 pandemic. The record debuted at number 11 on the Official UK Americana Charts and was described by Lisa Verrico in The Sunday Times as "an eclectic mix of spooky and sweet...a Quentin Tarantino-style soundtrack". The single had an accompanying music video that featured footage from her time recording the album in Texas and shooting the artwork in California.

In the spring of 2022, Watt released a collaboration with British blues artist Mississippi MacDonald called "Devils Chain". In October 2022, Watt appeared as a special guest for Samuel Jack on his UK tour in Glasgow at King Tut's Wah Wah Hut.
