= Shane Profitt =

- Born: January 17, 2000 (age 26); Columbia, Tennessee, U.S.
- Origin: Nashville, Tennessee, U.S.
- Genre: Country
- Occupation: Singer-songwriter
- Instrument: Vocals
- Years active: 2021–present
- Label: Harpeth 60, Big Machine
- Spouse: Chloe Crawford (m. 2026)

Shane Profitt (born January 17, 2000) is an American country music singer. He made his debut in 2022 with the single "How It Oughta Be".

== Biography ==
Shane Profitt was born in Columbia, Tennessee.

Profitt began playing guitar in 2018 when his grandfather gave him one for Christmas. After this, he began learning to perform cover songs at local venues in addition to writing his own material. After encountering a woman at a guitar store, he took her on a date to a sushi restaurant where he met country music singer Chris Janson and his wife, Kelly, who is also his manager. The Jansons signed Profitt to a songwriting contract, which led to Janson recording two of his songs on his 2021 album All In. He also selected Profitt as an opening act on his Halfway to Crazy tour.

This led to Profitt signing with Big Machine Records along with Janson's imprint label, Harpeth 60 Records, in 2022. The label released his debut extended play Maury County Line that August, along with lead single "How It Oughta Be". In February 2023, "How It Oughta Be" reached number 16 on Billboard Country Airplay.

On October 16, 2026, Profitt married Chloe Crawford in Nashville.

== Discography ==
=== Extended plays ===
Title	Details
Maury County Line	Released: August 5, 2022; Label: Big Machine Records

=== Singles ===
List of singles, with selected chart positions
Year	Title	Peak positions		Album
Year	Title	US Country Airplay	CAN Country	Album
2022	"How It Oughta Be"	16	17	Maury County Line
2025	"Long Live Country"	30	—	Non-album single
