= My Little Pony: A New Generation (soundtrack) =

My Little Pony: A New Generation (Original Motion Picture Soundtrack)

Soundtrack album by various artists
- Released: September 24, 2021
- Recorded: 2020–2021
- Genre: Pop
- Length: 19:25
- Label: eOne Music; Hasbro
- Producer: Alan Schmuckler; Michael Mahler; Ron Fair (exec.)

My Little Pony chronology
My Little Pony: The Movie (2017)	My Little Pony: A New Generation (Original Motion Picture Soundtrack) (2021)

My Little Pony: A New Generation (Original Motion Picture Soundtrack) is the soundtrack to the 2021 film My Little Pony: A New Generation directed by Robert Cullen and José Luis Ucha. The album featured seven songs performed by the film's cast and released on September 24, 2021 alongside the film.

== Development ==
Songwriters Alan Schmuckler and Michael Mahler composed songs for the film, while Heitor Pereira did the original score for the film. Director Robert Cullen said that he wanted the soundtrack to "have an eclectic range of genres in the songs", in order to make it "as unpredictable as [they] can" in hopes of defying the audiences' expectations regarding the soundtrack. He praised Schmuckler and Mahler's work of having a "punk rock, Nirvana-esque song" in the film which was unexpected and felt the songs to be "brilliant, super catchy, airborne".

== Promotion ==
The soundtrack was promoted with three singles: On September 2, 2021, the first song "Glowin' Up", performed by Sofia Carson and written by Jenna Andrews, Bryan Fryzel, and Taylor Upsahl, was released to digital platforms. The music video of the song featuring Carson was released on October 8, 2021. The second single, "It's Alright" by Johnny Orlando, was released on September 16, 2021. The film's soundtrack was released alongside the film on September 24, 2021.

== Track listing ==
No.	Title	Performer(s)	Length
1.	"Glowin' Up"	Sofia Carson	3:11
2.	"Gonna Be My Day"	Vanessa Hudgens	2:38
3.	"I'm Looking Out for You"	Hudgens; Kimiko Glenn	2:04
4.	"Danger, Danger (Note: Also known as "Angry Mob")"	Alan Schmuckler	2:11
5.	"Fit Right In"	Hudgens; Glenn; James Marsden	2:50
6.	"Together"	Callie Twisselman	3:15
7.	"It's Alright"	Johnny Orlando	3:13
Total length:			19:25

== Charts ==
Chart (2022)	Peak position
UK Soundtrack Albums (OCC)	23
