= Drake Milligan =

American singer (born 1998)

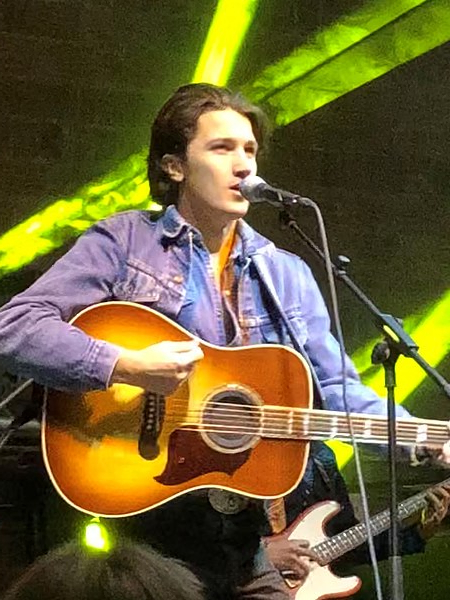
- Milligan performing in 2022

Background information
- Born: June 1, 1998 (age 28); Arlington, Texas, U.S.
- Origin: Nashville, Tennessee, U.S.
- Genres: Country, Country Swing
- Occupations: Singer
- Instruments: Vocals, guitar
- Years active: 2017–present
- Labels: BBR, Stoney Creek
- Website: www.drakemilligan.com

Drake Milligan (born June 1, 1998) is an American singer, best known for portraying Elvis Presley on the CMT series Sun Records and starring in the film Nobody where he portrayed a young teen Elvis. He has also appeared on American Idol and America's Got Talent. Milligan has charted with the singles "Sounds Like Something I'd Do" and "Honky Tonkin' About", the latter of which became his first number one when it topped the Canadian country chart. His debut album, Dallas/Fort Worth, was released on September 15, 2022.

== Biography ==
Drake Milligan was born in Arlington, Texas, on June 1, 1998, to James & Angela Milligan. He was inspired by the country music his father listened to, particularly Merle Haggard, as well as an Elvis impersonator he saw sing at a nearby restaurant. After performing locally as an Elvis impersonator himself, Milligan answered a casting call by CMT for the role of Elvis Presley in their TV series Sun Records (2017). He ended up landing the part, which required him to move from Texas to Memphis, Tennessee, near the end of his senior year of high school.

Milligan competed on American Idol in 2018 but ultimately dropped out. "I decided that I wasn't quite ready for that platform yet, and that it would be a better step for me to move to Nashville and focus on my music first," he said.

While in Nashville, Milligan also auditioned for a recording contract with BBR Music Group. After initially rejecting him, the label signed him six months later. In July 2021, he released his self-titled debut extended play, which was produced by Tony Brown. On October 22, 2021, he released the Christmas song "Cowgirl for Christmas".

Milligan and his band appeared on America's Got Talent on June 8, 2022, receiving four "yes" votes for his performance of an original song, "Sounds Like Something I'd Do". Drake finished the season in 3rd place on September 14, 2022. Drake and his band made a special appearance on an AGT's Results Night, September 13, 2023, performing his new single, "I Got A Problem".

Milligan's debut album, Dallas/Fort Worth was released on September 15, 2022. In October 2022, he made his Grand Ole Opry debut.

In 2023, he collaborated with The Reklaws on the single "Honky Tonkin' About". Milligan joined the duo to perform the song live at the 2023 Canadian Country Music Awards in Hamilton, Ontario. On September 7, 2023, he released the single, "I Got A Problem".

Milligan released another EP, “Jukebox Songs” on February 16, 2024. His second studio album, Tumbleweed, was released on November 7, 2025. and rose to the top of the UK Country Albums in late March, 2026.

== Discography ==
=== Studio albums ===
List of albums, showing other relevant details
Title	Details	Peak chart positions
Title	Details	UK Country
Dallas/Fort Worth	Release: September 15, 2022; Label: BBR Music Group; Formats: CD, LP, digital	6
Tumbleweed	Release: November 7, 2025; Label: BBR Music Group; Formats: CD, LP, digital	1

=== Extended plays ===
List of EPs, showing relevant details
Title	Details
Drake Milligan	Released: July 23, 2021; Label: This Is Hit/BBR; Formats: CD, digital
Jukebox Songs	Released: February 16, 2024; Label: This Is Hit/Stoney Creek; Formats: CD, digital

=== Singles ===
==== As lead artist ====
Single	Year	Peak chart positions		Album
Single	Year	US Country Airplay	UK Country Airplay	Album
"Cowgirl for Christmas"	2021	—	—	Non-album single
"Sounds Like Something I'd Do"	2022	40	—	Dallas/Fort Worth
"I Got a Problem"	2023	—	17	Jukebox Songs
"What I Couldn't Forget"	2024	—	19	Jukebox Songs
"Tumbleweed"	2025	—	8	Tumbleweed

==== As featured artist ====
Year	Single	Artist	Peak positions		Album
Year	Single	Artist	CAN Country	CAN Digital	Album
2023	"Honky Tonkin' About"	The Reklaws	1	35	TBA

=== Other charted songs ===
List of singles as a featured artist
Title	Year	Peak chart positions	Album
Title	Year	UK Country	Album
"How Much Beer?" (with Randall King)	2026	10	Tumbleweed

== Awards and nominations ==
Year	Award show	Category	Nominated work	Result	References
2023	CMT Music Awards	Male Breakthrough video of the Year	"Sounds Like Something I'd Do"	Nominated	
2024	Canadian Country Music Association Awards	Vocal Collaboration of the Year	"Honky Tonkin' About" (with The Reklaws)	Won	
2024	Canadian Country Music Association Awards	Video of the Year	"Honky Tonkin' About" (with The Reklaws)	Nominated	
2026	Country Music Association Awards	International Artist Achievement Award	Himself	Pending	
