= Fairground Saints =

- Origin: Santa Barbara, California, United States
- Genre: Country
- Years active: 2014–present
- Label: The Orchard
- Members: Megan McAllister, Mason Van Valin, Elijah Edwards
- Website: www.fairgroundsaints.com

Fairground Saints are a country music trio from Santa Barbara, CA. Their singles include "Somewhere Down the Line”, “California”, “Turn This Car Around” and “Can’t Control the Weather.”

== Origin ==
The band was started by Mason Van Valin who wanted to expand from a solo act to a group. He posted an ad on Facebook and Elijah Edwards answered the ad. They eventually would meet Megan McAllister through YouTube. They were signed initially to Verve Records in 2014. After the label changed leadership they released new music through The Orchard.

== Albums ==
They released their self-titled album for Verve in 2015. The album includes the hit “Turn This Car Around” which was premiered on NPR. The album's second single “Can’t Control the Weather” was premiered on Paste Magazine on September 21, 2015.

In Dec 2016, the Huffington Post listed the trio as one of ‘Music’s Fantastic 15 of 2015.’

In 2017, the group toured with former American Idol winner Scotty McCreery. They have also supported Bros Osborne, Kip Moore, Sara Evans, and Thompson Square on the road.

In 2019, Rolling Stone had this say "...their brand of breezy music and distinct Laurel Canyon vibe made the Saints instantly memorable". Also, calling them one of The 10 Country and Americana artists you need to know. Taste of Country said "think Little Big Town with a closer connection to West Coast sun and Surf"

== Discography ==
- Fairground Saints (Verve Records, 2015)
- Magic (The Orchard, 2019)
