= Noah Rinker =

American country musician

- Born: March 25, 2002 (age 24); Shaver Lake, California
- Genres: Americana; Country music; Folk rock
- Years active: 2022–present
- Label: Warner Records
- Website: www.noahrinker.com

Noah Rinker is an American singer, songwriter, guitarist and pianist. He released his debut extended play, After Dark in 2024, which led to his signing with Warner Records. Rinker is known for his song "Save My Soul", which went viral on social media and caused him to gain international prominence.

== Early life ==
Rinker was raised in Shaver Lake, California, just outside Yosemite National Park. He began playing the piano at age five and took up the guitar shortly afterwards.

Growing up he worked as a service tech for his family's propane company. He began his music career in the early 2020s playing covers, and later originals, on TikTok. His first release was the single "Probably Should" on June 17, 2022.

== Career ==
In 2023, Rinker released his breakout single "Off My Mind", which was followed by his "After Dark" EP in 2024. Eventually, Rinker signed with Warner Records that same year. In July 2024, he also signed with Creative Artists Agency.

Warner Records released Rinker's next EP Burning Daylight in June 2025. It included the single "Wherever I Go," which was featured on the cover of Amazon's Bonfire playlist and hit No. 1 on Spotify's Hot Country playlist.

Holler included Rinker in its "25 New Artists for 2025". That year Rinker made his Grand Ole Opry debut and appeared at numerous festivals, such as CMA Fest, FairWell Festival, We Fest, and Salt Lake City's RedWest Fest. He toured with Wyatt Flores and (separately) Sam Barber. In September People named him an emerging artist to watch. The next month he headlined at the Troubadour in Los Angeles, and in November Country Now featured him in its "Country Next" series.

In October 2025 Warner Records released Rinker's third EP, The Pines, and two months later a live EP, Live at Sound Emporium, with live performances of songs from his previous EPs and live performance videos accompanying each track. By January 2026, Spotify had included him in its "Artists to Watch 2026" playlist.

A U.S. headline tour was announced for February 2026, including Stagecoach 2026, and he was added to the C2C Berlin 2026 lineup.

== Artistry ==
Rinker cites John Mayer, Mumford & Sons, The Lumineers, Tyler Childers, Lynyrd Skynyrd, Creedence Clearwater Revival, and Cat Stevens among his major sonic influences. Of his sound, Rinker stated, "I would say my heart is a storyteller and a songwriter, and I love adding popular influences into storytelling, songwriting and just making instrumental-focused, rootsy music that rides the line in a lot of ways and is more progressive".

== Discography ==
Title	Year	Label
Live at Sound Emporium (EP)	December 2025	Warner Records
The Pines (EP)	October 2025	Warner Records
Burning Daylight (EP)	June 2025	Warner Records
After Dark (EP)	2024	Warner Records
