= Brian Collins (2010s singer) =

American singer-songwriter

- Origin: Douglasville, Georgia, United States
- Occupation: Singer-songwriter
- Instrument(s): Vocals, guitar, harmonica
- Years active: 2007–present
- Labels: Blue Light Entertainment
- Website: briancollinsmusic.com

Brian Collins is an American country music artist born and raised in Douglasville, Georgia, United States. Brian has charted two singles on the MusicRow Country Breakout Chart and one single on the Billboard Indicator Chart.

== Discography ==
=== Singles ===
Year	Single	Chart Positions		Album
Year	Single	MusicRow Country Breakout	Billboard Indicator	Album
2015	"Never Really Left"	40	—	Healing Highway
2015	"Shine A Little Love"	9	34	Healing Highway
2016	"Healing Highway"	–	—	Healing Highway
