= Dallas/Fort Worth (album) =

Studio album by Drake Milligan
- Released: September 15, 2022
- Genre: Neotraditional country
- Length: 43:28
- Label: BBR Music Group
- Producers: Tony Brown; Brandon Hood

Drake Milligan chronology
Drake Milligan (2021)	Dallas/Fort Worth (2022)	Tumbleweed (2025)

Singles from Dallas/Fort Worth
- 1. "Sounds Like Something I'd Do" Released: September 19, 2022

Dallas/Fort Worth is the debut studio album by American country music singer–songwriter Drake Milligan. It was released on September 15, 2022, via the BBR Music Group. Milligan co-wrote all 14 tracks on the album. It includes the single "Sounds Like Something I'd Do". The album reached number one on both the iTunes Top Country Albums chart and the iTunes all-genre Top Albums chart.

== Background ==
The album was announced on August 9, 2022, as an expansion to his self-titled 2021 extended play which included five of the tracks on Dallas/Fort Worth. In a statement accompanying the announcement, Milligan explained "As a lifelong country music fan, it has been my dream to make a full-length record that pays homage to traditional country roots, while still bringing new sounds and energy to the genre". Discussing the album's title, Milligan explained As a native son of the Dallas/Fort Worth area, I’ve always been intrigued by the difference between the two cities. First, there's Dallas: a city determined to prove that everything really is bigger in Texas. Then, just 30 miles to the west, there's Fort Worth: a city that holds true to its Stockyard roots with a taut rope around its cowboy brand. My goal was to bring those same distinctions to the two parts of this album. On Dallas, the songs have a little more polish on their boots. On Fort Worth, there are nods to those traditional Honky-Tonkin’, Western swingin’, cowboy culture roots that I'm based in."

== Track listing ==
Dallas/Fort Worth track listing
No.	Title	Writer(s)	Length
1.	"Sounds Like Something I'd Do"	Brett Beavers; Terry McBride; Drake Milligan	2:26
2.	"Kiss Goodbye All Night"	Brandon Hood; Josh Jenkins; Milligan; Phil O'Donnell	2:50
3.	"Hating Everything She Tries On"	Brent Anderson; Lynn Hutton; Milligan	2:45
4.	"She"	Hood; Milligan; John Pierce	2:53
5.	"Bad Day to Be a Beer"	Marv Green; J. T. Harding; Milligan	2:32
6.	"Hearts Don't Break Even"	Hood; Milligan; Liz Rose	3:02
7.	"Dance of a Lifetime"	Hood; Milligan; O'Donnell	2:52
8.	"Over Drinkin' Under Thinkin'"	Beavers; Brice Long; Milligan	3:17
9.	"Tipping Point"	Hood; Josh London; McBride; Milligan	2:14
10.	"Don't Look Down"	Hood; Milligan; Pierce	2:37
11.	"Goin' Down Swingin'" (featuring Vince Gill)	Hood; Milligan; O'Donnell	3:26
12.	"Save It for a Sunny Day"	Green; Milligan; Tim Nichols	3:35
13.	"Long Haul"	Bob DiPiero; Hood; Milligan	4:40
14.	"Cowboy Kind of Way"	Hood; McBride; Milligan	4:19
Total length:			43:28

== Personnel ==
Credits adapted from AllMusic.

- Drake Milligan - vocals, acoustic guitar, electric guitar
- Vince Gill - featured vocals on "Goin' Down Swingin'"
- Marv Green - backing vocals
- Trey Keller - backing vocals
- Terry McBride - backing vocals
- Cherie Oakley - backing vocals
- James Burton - electric guitar
- Tom Bukovac - acoustic guitar, electric guitar
- Douglas B. Green - backing vocals, rhythm guitar
- Ilya Toshinskiy - acoustic guitar
- Brandon Hood - acoustic guitar, electric guitar, mandolin, programming, sitar
- Andy Reiss - electric guitar
- Brad Albin - bass
- Mark Hill - bass
- Charlie Judge - synthesizer
- Gordon Mote - organ, piano, synthesizer, Wurlitzer electric piano
- Chris McHugh - drums
- Billy Thomas - drums
- Eric Darken - percussion
- Bruce Bouton - steel guitar
- Tommy White - pedal steel guitar
- Paul Franklin - steel guitar
- Stuart Duncan - fiddle, mandolin
- Larry Franklin - fiddle
- Kenny Sears - backing vocals, fiddle
- Joe Spivey - fiddle
- Jeff Taylor - accordion
- David Huff - programming
- Justin Niebank - programming

Production

- Tony Brown - production
- Brandon Hood - production, digital editing, engineering
- Amy Garges - assistant producer
- Lance Van Dyke - recording
- Matt Rausch - recording
- Seth Morton - engineering, recording
- Nathan Dantzler - engineering
- Mark Hagan - digital editing
- David Huff - digital editing
- Trey Keller - digital editing, engineering

== Charts ==
Chart performance for Dallas/Fort Worth
Chart	Peak position
UK Country Albums (Official Charts)	6
