= Willow Avalon =

American country singer-songwriter

- Born: Willow Avalon Martin; August 20, 1998 (age 28); Carlton, Georgia, U.S.
- Occupations: Singer; songwriter
- Years active: 2012–present
- Relatives: Jim White (father)
- Musical career
- Genre: Country
- Instruments: Vocals; guitar; piano
- Label: Atlantic
- Website: willowavalonmusic.com

Willow Martin (born August 20, 1998), known professionally as Willow Avalon, is an American country singer-songwriter. She is signed to Atlantic Records. She released her debut EP, Stranger in 2024, followed by her first album, Southern Belle Raisin' Hell, in 2025.

== Early life ==
Willow Martin was born in Carlton, Georgia, on August 20, 1998. She is the daughter of musician Jim White. Her parents separated when she was a child. White's song "Bluebird" was written about her. Willow was inspired by country and gospel music leading her to learn how to play both piano and guitar by age 12. Avalon was later raised in Carlton, Georgia. Avalon moved out and dropped out of high school in 2015 at age 16, before leaving Georgia for Los Angeles in 2016.

== Career ==
Avalon released her first original song, "You’re Not Mine", on YouTube in 2012. She performed on the kids' stage at that year's Athfest after winning Monsignor Donovan Catholic High School's battle of the band competition, Ram Jam (interview with Donovan's music coordinator, May 23, 2025), and opened for the Drive-By Truckers at the 40 Watt Club. Avalon signed to her first label at 18, but the deal fell through and her contract was cancelled.

Avalon self-published a single, "Drivin", in 2021. She signed to Atlantic Records/Assemble Sound in 2023. Her debut EP, Stranger, was released on February 29, 2024. The EP was recorded at Electric Lady Studios in Greenwich Village, New York City.

In 2025 her songs "Tequila and Whiskey" and "Homewrecker" went viral on Tiktok. Soon after, Avalon released her debut album, Southern Belle Raisin' Hell, on January 17, 2025. She used her mugshot from a previous arrest for the album's cover. She celebrated the release with a performance of "Homewrecker" on The Late Show with Stephen Colbert.

In late 2024, Avalon announced a headline tour with performances across North America. The tour was later expanded to add venues in the UK and Ireland. The first performance of the tour was held on January 30, 2025, in Philadelphia.

The Tennessean named Avalon one of their Top Artists to Watch in 2025. On February 7, 2025, Avalon performed at the Exit/In in Nashville.

On June 26, 2026, she released Pink Pocket Pistol, her second studio album. She will embark on the Pink Pocket Pistol Tour in July of 2026, touring cities in the US, Canada and Europe.

== Tour ==
Headliner

Southern Belle Raisin' Hell (2025)

Pink Pocket Pistol (2026)

Opening

With Heaven on Tour Hyde Park Date (2025)

== Discography ==
=== Studio album ===
Title	Album details
Southern Belle Raisin' Hell	Released: January 17, 2025; Label: Atlantic/Assemble Sound
Pink Pocket Pistol	Released: June 26, 2026; Label: Atlantic/Assemble Sound

=== Extended play ===
Title	EP details
Stranger	Released: February 29, 2024; Label: Atlantic/Assemble Sound

=== Singles ===
Title	Year	Certifications	Album
"Drivin"	2021		Stranger
"Stranger"	2023		Stranger
"Honey Ain't No Sweeter"	2024		Stranger
"Gettin' Rich, Goin' Broke"	2024		Stranger
"Hey There, Dolly"	2024		Southern Belle Raisin' Hell
"Tequila or Whiskey"	2024		Southern Belle Raisin' Hell
"Homewrecker"	2024		Southern Belle Raisin' Hell
"Something We Regret"	2024		Southern Belle Raisin' Hell
"Save a Little Christmas"	2024		Non-album single
"Baby Blue"	2025		Southern Belle Raisin' Hell
"Smoke & Embers" with Waylon Wyatt	2025		Out of the Blue
"Easy on the Eyes"	2026		Pink Pocket Pistol
"Cardinal Sin" with Jason Isbell	2026		Pink Pocket Pistol
