= Old Dominion discography =

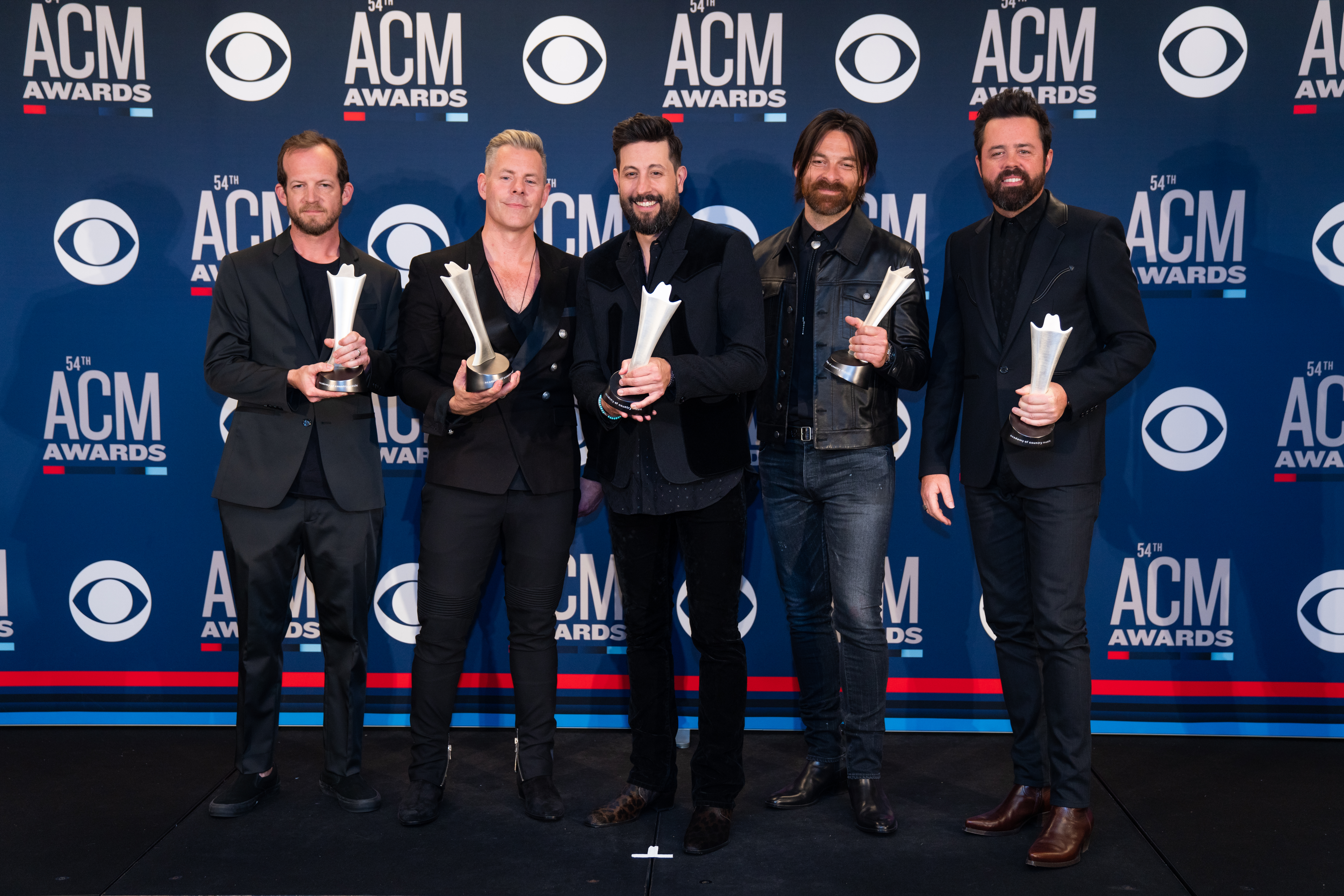
- Old Dominion in 2017.
- Studio albums: 6
- EPs: 4
- Compilation albums: 1
- Singles: 14
- Music videos: 17
- Other charted songs: 2
- No. 1 singles: 7

American country music band Old Dominion has released six studio albums, one compilation album, four extended plays, and fourteen singles. Founded in 2012, the band began recording after three of its members, Matthew Ramsey, Trevor Rosen, and Brad Tursi, all had success as songwriters for other artists. This led to them self-releasing an extended play titled It Was Always Yours in 2012, followed by a self-titled one in 2014. Produced by Shane McAnally, the latter included their debut single "Shut Me Up".

This song's success led to the band signing with RCA Records Nashville, for which they have released five studio albums: Meat and Candy in 2015, Happy Endings in 2017, Old Dominion in 2019, Time, Tequila, & Therapy in 2021, Memory Lane in 2023, and Barbara in 2025. These albums have accounted for multiple chart entries on the Billboard Hot Country Songs and Country Airplay charts. On the latter, they have reached the number-one position with "Break Up with Him", "Song for Another Time", "No Such Thing as a Broken Heart", "Written in the Sand", "Hotel Key", "Make It Sweet", and "One Man Band".

== Albums ==
=== Studio albums ===
Title	Album details	Peak chart positions				Certifications (sales threshold)	Sales
Title	Album details	US	US Country	AUS	CAN	Certifications (sales threshold)	Sales
Meat and Candy	Release date: November 6, 2015; Label: RCA Nashville; Formats: CD, digital download	16	3	—	30	RIAA: Platinum	US: 192,900
Happy Endings	Release date: August 25, 2017; Label: RCA Nashville; Formats: CD, digital download	7	1	84	12	RIAA: Platinum	US: 107,400
Old Dominion	Release date: October 25, 2019; Label: RCA Nashville; Formats: LP, CD, digital download, streaming	9	1	79	21	RIAA: Platinum; MC: Platinum	US: 59,400
Time, Tequila & Therapy	Release date: October 8, 2021; Label: RCA Nashville; Formats: CD, digital download, streaming	27	4	—	37		
Memory Lane	Release date: October 6, 2023; Label: RCA Nashville; Formats: CD, digital download, streaming	56	13	—	—		
Barbara	Release date: August 22, 2025; Label: RCA Nashville; Formats: CD, digital download, streaming	136	29	—	—		
"—" denotes releases that did not chart

=== Compilation albums ===
Title	Album details	Peak chart positions	
Title	Album details	US	US Country
Odies but Goodies	Released: September 6, 2024; Label: RCA Nashville; Formats: 2×CD, digital download, streaming	85	19

== Extended plays ==
Title	Extended play details	Peak chart positions			Sales
Title	Extended play details	US	US Country	US Heat	Sales
It Was Always Yours	Release date: 2012; Label: Self-released; Formats: CD, digital download	—	—	—	
Old Dominion	Release date: October 7, 2014; Label: ReeSmack Records; Formats: CD, digital download	148	33	9	US: 32,300
Memory Lane (Sampler)	Release date: January 9, 2023; Label: Arista Nashville; Formats: Digital download	—	—	—	
Memory Lane	Released: June 23, 2023; Label: Three Up Three Down, Sony; Formats: Digital download, streaming	56	13	—	
"—" denotes releases that did not chart

== Spotify-exclusive compilations ==
List of compilations with notes
Title	Description	Notes
Old Dominion Originals	Released: July 24, 2014; Label: ReeSmack Records	Spotify-exclusive EP consisting of two songs that were written by members of Old Dominion but originally released by other artists: "Wake Up Lovin' You" and "Chainsaw". Also included is a radio edit of "Dirt on a Road", a song from the ReeSmack Records release of Old Dominion's self-titled EP.
Spotify Singles	Released: August 8, 2018; Label: RCA Nashville	Spotify-exclusive EP consisting of a live version of "Hotel Key" and a cover of Halsey's "Bad at Love"

== Singles ==
Title	Year	Peak chart positions					Certifications (sales threshold)	Sales	Album
Title	Year	US	US Country	US Country Airplay	CAN	CAN Country	Certifications (sales threshold)	Sales	Album
"Shut Me Up"	2014	—	—	58	—	—			Old Dominion (EP)
"Break Up with Him"	2015	44	3	1	53	3	RIAA: 2× Platinum; MC: Platinum	US: 719,000	Meat and Candy
"Snapback"	2016	50	4	2	68	1	RIAA: 3× Platinum; MC: Platinum	US: 413,570	Meat and Candy
"Song for Another Time"	2016	59	4	1	91	3	RIAA: Platinum; MC: Gold	US: 309,000	Meat and Candy
"No Such Thing as a Broken Heart"	2017	46	4	1	79	2	RIAA: Platinum; MC: Platinum	US: 247,000	Happy Endings
"Written in the Sand"	2017	51	3	1	83	1	RIAA: 3× Platinum; MC: Platinum	US: 246,000	Happy Endings
"Hotel Key"	2018	48	5	1	76	2	RIAA: Platinum; MC: Gold	US: 105,000	Happy Endings
"Make It Sweet"	2018	56	8	1	70	1	RIAA: Platinum; MC: Platinum	US: 101,000	Old Dominion
"One Man Band"	2019	20	2	1	45	1	RIAA: 8× Platinum; MC: 5× Platinum; RMNZ: Platinum	US: 278,000	Old Dominion
"Some People Do"	2020	—	38	28	—	45	RIAA: Gold	US: 15,000	Old Dominion
"Never Be Sorry"	2020	—	50	38	—	—			Old Dominion
"I Was on a Boat That Day"	2021	37	8	9	44	1	RIAA: Platinum		Time, Tequila & Therapy
"No Hard Feelings"	2021	— (Note: "No Hard Feelings" did not enter the US Billboard Hot 100, but peaked at number one on the Bubbling Under Hot 100 chart.)	24	14	54	4	RIAA: Gold		Time, Tequila & Therapy
"Memory Lane"	2023	27	7	4	47	1	RIAA: 2× Platinum; RMNZ: Gold		Memory Lane
"Can't Break Up Now" (with Megan Moroney)	2023	—	42	19	—	44			Memory Lane
"Coming Home"	2024	—	42	16	—	42			Odies but Goodies
"Making Good Time"	2025	—	—	22	—	13			Barbara
"—" denotes releases that did not chart

=== Featured singles ===
Year	Title	Peak positions	Album
Year	Title	US Country Airplay	Album
2021	"I Can't" (Caitlyn Smith featuring Old Dominion)	37	Supernova
2022	"Beer with My Friends" (Kenny Chesney featuring Old Dominion)	28	—N/a

== Other charted songs ==
Year	Title	Peak positions	Album
Year	Title	US Country Airplay	Album
2016	"Beer Can in a Truck Bed"	50	Meat and Candy

== Music videos ==
Year	Video	Director
2014	"Shut Me Up"	Marcel Chagnon
2015	"Break Up with Him"	Steve Condon
2015	"Break Up with Him" (live)	David Poag
2016	"Snapback"	Steve Condon
2016	"Song for Another Time"	Steve Condon
2017	"No Such Thing as a Broken Heart"	Steve Condon
2017	"Shoe Shopping"	Steve Jawn
2017	"Not Everything's About You"	Steve Jawn
2017	"Be with Me"	Steve Condon
2017	"Written in the Sand (Instant Grat Video)"	Steve Condon
2017	"Written in the Sand (Tour Video)"	Mason Allen
2018	"Hotel Key"	Jim Wright
2018	"Make It Sweet"	Shaun Silva
2019	"One Man Band"	Mason Allen
2019	"My Heart Is a Bar"	Mason Allen
2020	"Some People Do"	Mason Allen
2021	"I Was on a Boat That Day"	Mason Allen
2023	"Memory Lane"	Mason Allen; Nicki Fletcher
2023	"Can't Break Up Now"	Mason Allen; Nicki Fletcher
