= Odies but Goodies =

Compilation album by Old Dominion
- Released: September 6, 2024
- Genre: Country
- Length: 101:00
- Label: RCA Nashville
- Producer: Shane McAnally; Ross Copperman; Old Dominion

Old Dominion chronology
Memory Lane (2023)	Odies but Goodies (2024)	Barbara (2025)

Singles from Odies but Goodies
- 1. "Coming Home" Released: July 1, 2024

Odies but Goodies is the first compilation album by American country music band Old Dominion. It was released on September 6, 2024, via Sony Music Nashville's RCA Nashville imprint. It was preceded by the release of Coming Home".

== Track listing ==
Odies but Goodies track listing
No.	Title	Writer(s)	Producer(s)	Length
1.	"Coming Home"	Shane McAnally; Matthew Ramsey; Trevor Rosen; Whit Sellers; Geoff Sprung; Brad Tursi	Old Dominion; McAnally	2:50
2.	"Lookin' for Love"	Wanda Mallette; Bob Morrison; Patti Ryan	Old Dominion; McAnally	3:30
3.	"Song for Another Time"	Matt Jenkins; Ramsey; Rosen; Tursi	McAnally	3:13
4.	"Beer Can in a Truck Bed"	Jenkins; Ramsey; Rosen	McAnally	3:22
5.	"Make It Sweet"	McAnally; Ramsey; Rosen; Sellers; Sprung; Tursi	Old Dominion; McAnally	3:06
6.	"My Heart Is a Bar"	McAnally; Josh Osborne; Ramsey; Rosen; Tursi	Old Dominion; McAnally	3:59
7.	"All I Know About Girls"	McAnally; Osborne; Ramsey; Rosen; Sellers; Sprung; Tursi	Old Dominion; McAnally	2:43
8.	"Wrong Turns"	Jenkins; Ramsey; Rosen	McAnally	3:29
9.	"Snapback"	Ramsey; Rosen; Tursi	McAnally	3:27
10.	"Stars in the City" (featuring Little Big Town)	Osborne; Ramsey; Rosen; Tursi	McAnally	3:20
11.	"Break Up with Him"	Ramsey; Rosen; Sellers; Sprung; Tursi	McAnally	3:27
12.	"I Should Have Married You"	McAnally; Ramsey; Rosen; Sellers; Sprung; Tursi	McAnally	2:43
13.	"Written in the Sand"	McAnally; Ramsey; Rosen; Tursi	McAnally	3:06
14.	"Hear You Now"	McAnally; Ramsey; Rosen; Sellers; Sprung; Tursi	McAnally	4:22
15.	"How Good Is That"	Ross Copperman; Osborne; Ramsey; Rosen; Tursi	Old Dominion; McAnally	2:55
16.	"Some People Do"	Jesse Frasure; McAnally; Ramsey; Thomas Rhett	Old Dominion; McAnally	3:16
17.	"Hotel Key"	Osborne; Ramsey; Rosen	McAnally	2:48
18.	"I Was on a Boat That Day"	McAnally; Osborne; Ramsey; Rosen; Sellers; Sprung; Tursi	Old Dominion; McAnally	2:59
19.	"Not Everything's About You"	Andrew Dorff; Ramsey; Rosen; Tursi	McAnally	3:55
20.	"Some Horses"	Jenkins; McAnally	Old Dominion; McAnally	3:43
21.	"No Such Thing as a Broken Heart"	Frasure; Ramsey; Rosen; Tursi	McAnally	2:57
22.	"Memory Lane"	Jessie Jo Dillon; Ramsey; Rosen; Tursi	Old Dominion; McAnally	2:52
23.	"One Man Band"	Osborne; Ramsey; Rosen; Tursi	Old Dominion; McAnally	3:06
24.	"Nowhere Fast"	Jenkins; Ramsey; Rosen	McAnally	3:10
25.	"Shut Me Up"	Dorff; Ramsey; Tursi	McAnally	2:50
26.	"Hawaii"	McAnally; Ramsey; Rosen; Sellers; Sprung; Tursi	Old Dominion; McAnally	2:55
27.	"Lonely Side of Town" (featuring Gladys Knight)	McAnally; Osborne; Ramsey; Rosen; Sellers; Sprung; Tursi	Old Dominion; McAnally	4:09
28.	"Can't Break Up Now" (with Megan Moroney)	Tofer Brown; Ramsey; Rosen; Emily Weisband	Old Dominion; Copperman	3:20
29.	"Never Be Sorry"	McAnally; Osborne; Ramsey; Rosen; Tursi	Old Dominion; McAnally	3:25
30.	"No Hard Feelings"	McAnally; Ramsey; Rosen; Sellers; Sprung; Tursi	Old Dominion; McAnally	3:10
31.	"Still Writings Songs About You"	McAnally; Ramsey; Rosen; Tursi	McAnally	3:37
Total length:				101:00

== Charts ==
=== Weekly charts ===
Weekly chart performance for Odies but Goodies
Chart (2024)	Peak position
US Billboard 200	85
US Top Country Albums (Billboard)	19

=== Year-end charts ===
Year-end chart performance for Odies but Goodies
Chart (2025)	Position
US Top Country Albums (Billboard)	37
