= Ryan Gore =

Ryan Gore is an American Grammy Award-winning mixer, engineer, and record producer based in Nashville, Tennessee. His studio credits range from country artists like Kacey Musgraves and Thomas Rhett, to pop, rock and R&B artists like Kelly Clarkson, Steven Tyler and Ne-Yo.

== Selected discography ==
=== Singles ===
- Sam Hunt – "Take Your Time" (Mixing, engineering)
- Kacey Musgraves – "Follow Your Arrow", "Merry Go 'Round" (Mixing, engineering)
- Old Dominion – "Break Up with Him", "Song For Another Time", "Snapback", "No Such Thing as a Broken Heart" (Mixing, engineering)
- Brett Eldredge – "Mean To Me" (Mixing, engineering)
- Country Music Association (Multiple artists) – "Forever Country" (Mixing, engineering)
- Miguel – "Waves" ft. Kacey Musgraves (Mixing, engineering)

=== Albums ===
- Sam Hunt – Montevallo (Mixing, engineering)
- Thomas Rhett – It Goes Like This (Engineering)
- Kacey Musgraves – Same Trailer Different Park and Pageant Material (Mixing, engineering)
- Brothers Osborne – Pawn Shop (Mixing, engineering)
- Jon Pardi – Write You A Song and California Sunrise (Mixing, engineering)
- Old Dominion – Meat and Candy and Happy Endings (Mixing, engineering)
- Lori McKenna – Lorraine (Mixing, engineering)
- The Cadillac Three – The Cadillac Three and Bury Me In My Boots (Mixing, engineering)
- Brett Eldredge – Bring You Back (Mixing, engineering)
- Jake Owen – Barefoot Blue Jean Night and American Love (Engineering)
- Brantley Gilbert – Halfway to Heaven (Mixing, engineering)
- Kelly Clarkson – Piece By Piece (Engineering)
- Ingrid Michaelson – It Doesn't Have to Make Sense (Engineering)
- Ne-Yo – R.E.D. (Engineering)
- Steven Tyler – We're All Somebody From Somewhere (Engineering)

== Awards and nominations ==
- Grammy WIN – Best Country Album 2013, Same Trailer, Different Park by Kacey Musgraves
- Grammy Nomination – Best Country Album 2016, Montevallo by Sam Hunt and Pageant Material by Kacey Musgraves
- CMA Nomination – Single of the Year 2017, "Dirt on My Boots" by Jon Pardi
- ACM Nomination – Audio Engineer of the Year 2019
- ACM Nomination – Album of the Year 2020, Heartache Medication by Jon Pardi
