= 55th Academy of Country Music Awards =

US music awards ceremony in 2020

- Date: September 16, 2020
- Location: Grand Ole Opry House; Ryman Auditorium; The Bluebird Cafe
- Hosted by: Keith Urban

Highlights
- Most wins: Luke Combs; Maren Morris; Thomas Rhett; Tenille Townes; (2 each)
- Most nominations: Thomas Rhett (4)

Television/radio coverage
- Network: CBS
- Viewership: 6.60 million

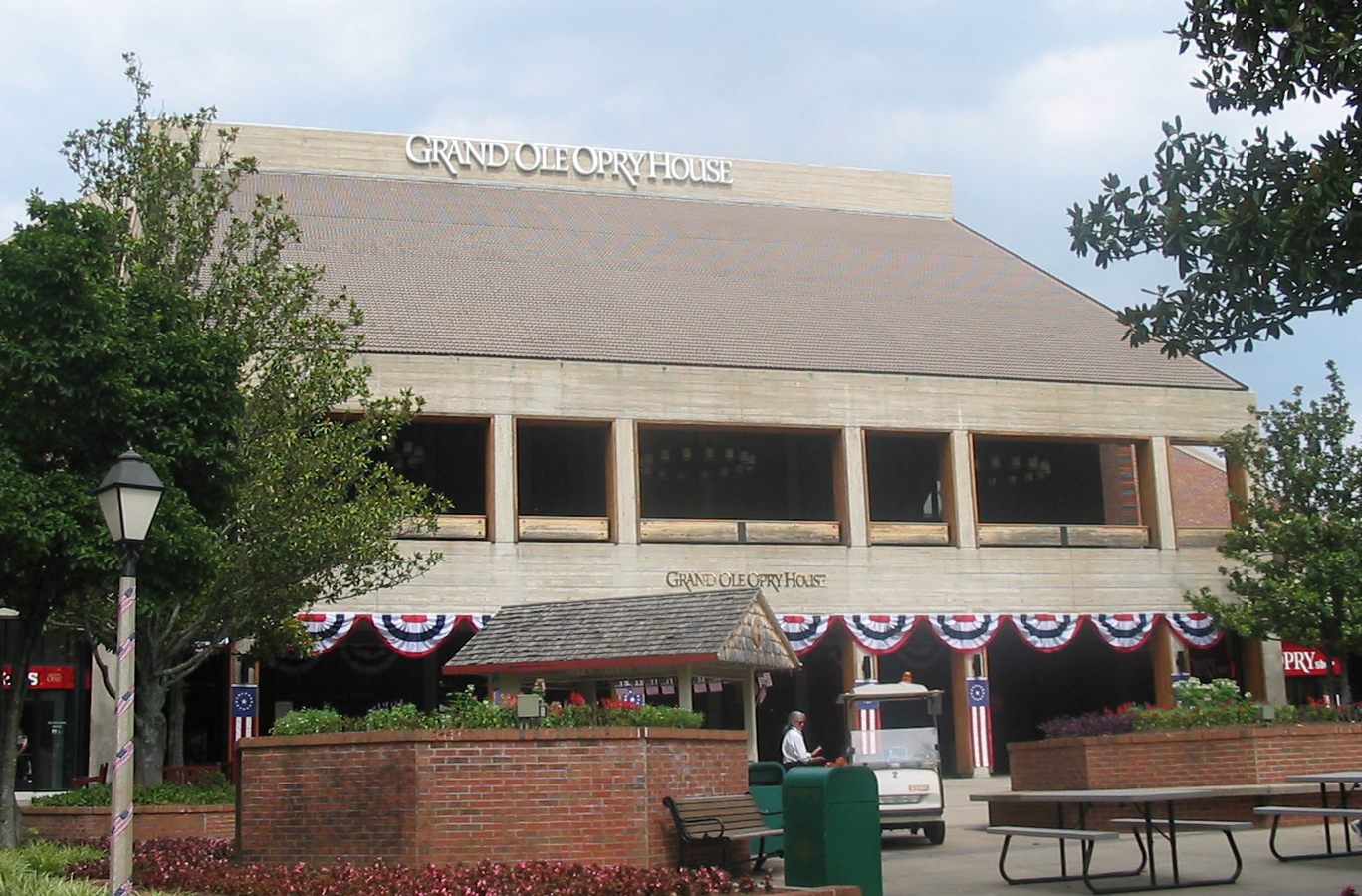
Grand Ole Opry House in Nashville, Tennessee.

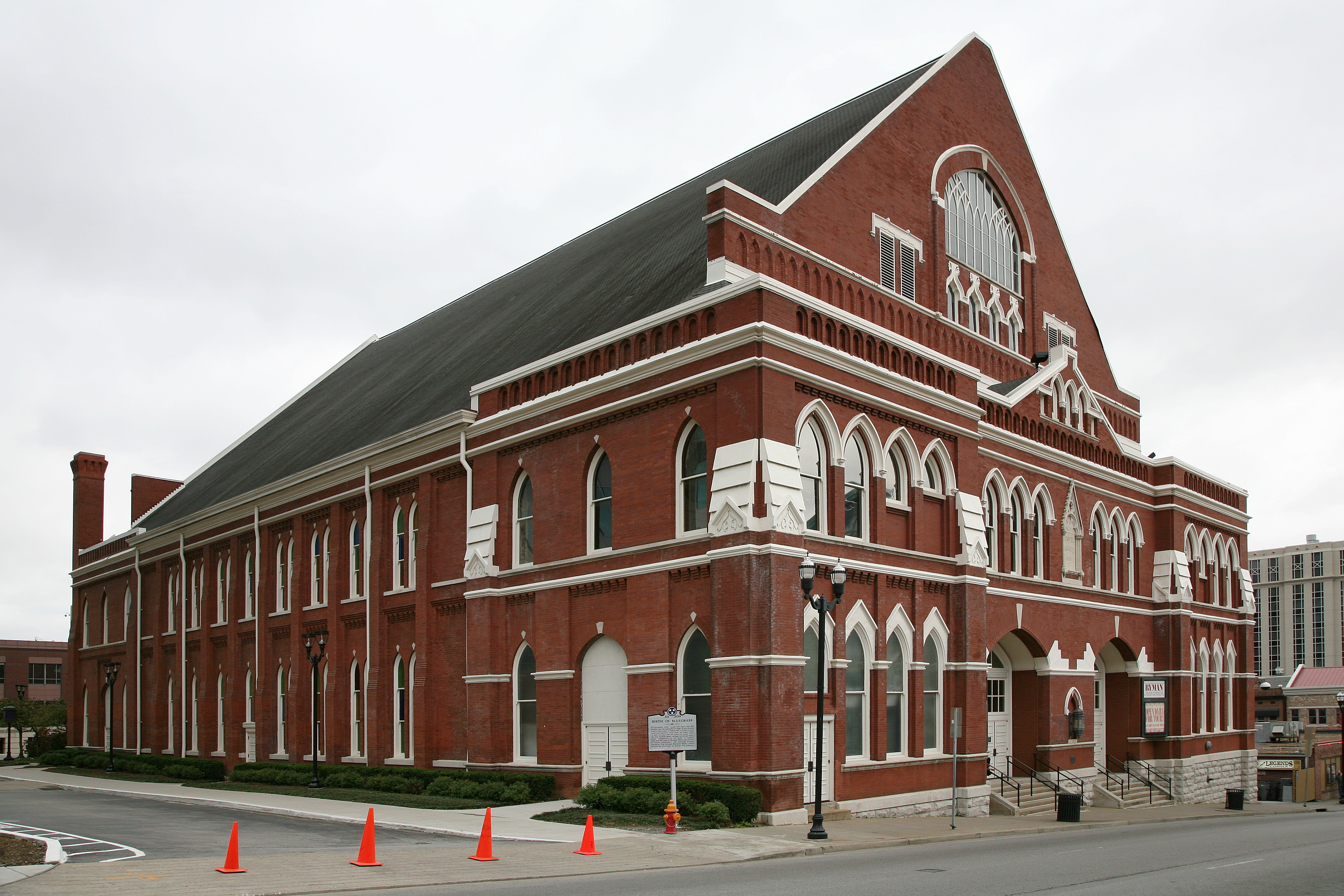
The Ryman Auditorium, the "Mother Church of Country Music" in Nashville, Tennessee.

The 55th Academy of Country Music Awards were held in Nashville, Tennessee, on September 16, 2020. Keith Urban was the host for the show. The event was originally planned to air on April 5 of the same year in Las Vegas, Nevada, but was postponed and relocated due to the COVID-19 pandemic.

The show was broadcast from the Grand Ole Opry House, Ryman Auditorium, and the Bluebird Café in Nashville, becoming the first major in-person award event to take place in the United States since the outbreak of the COVID-19 pandemic. With her Vocal Event win, Miranda Lambert won her thirty-fifth award, extending her record as the most awarded artist in ACM history. The ceremony also featured the first tie ever in ACM history for the highest honor of the evening, Entertainer of the Year, with both Thomas Rhett and Carrie Underwood claiming its title.

== Winners and nominees ==
Winners are shown in bold.

Entertainer of the Year	Album of the Year
**Carrie Underwood**; **Thomas Rhett**; Luke Bryan; Luke Combs; Eric Church	**What You See Is What You Get – Luke Combs**; Center Point Road – Thomas Rhett; Girl – Maren Morris; Heartache Medication – Jon Pardi; Wildcard – Miranda Lambert
Female Artist of the Year	Male Artist of the Year
**Maren Morris**; Kelsea Ballerini; Miranda Lambert; Kacey Musgraves; Carrie Underwood	**Luke Combs**; Dierks Bentley; Thomas Rhett; Chris Stapleton; Keith Urban
Group of the Year	Duo of the Year
**Old Dominion**; Lady A; Little Big Town; Midland; The Highwomen	**Dan + Shay**; Brooks & Dunn; Brothers Osborne; Florida Georgia Line; Maddie & Tae
Single of the Year	Song of the Year
**"God's Country" – Blake Shelton**; "One Man Band" – Old Dominion; "Rainbow" – Kacey Musgraves; "Rumor" – Lee Brice; "What If I Never Get Over You" – Lady A	**"One Man Band" – Josh Osborne, Matthew Ramsey, Trevor Rosen, Brad Tursi**; "10,000 Hours" – Dan Smyers, Shay Mooney, Justin Bieber, Jessie Jo Dillon, Jason Boyd, Jordan Reynolds; "Girl Goin' Nowhere" – Ashley McBryde, Jeremy Bussey; "God's Country" – Devin Dawson, Jordan Schmidt, Michael Hardy; "Some of It" – Eric Church, Jeff Hyde, Clint Daniels, Bobby Pinson
New Female Artist of the Year	New Male Artist of the Year
**Tenille Townes**; Caylee Hammack; Gabby Barrett; Ingrid Andress; Lindsay Ell	**Riley Green**; Cody Johnson; Jordan Davis; Morgan Wallen; Russell Dickerson
Songwriter of the Year	Video of the Year
**Hillary Lindsey**; Ashley Gorley; Josh Osborne; Michael Hardy; Shane McAnally	**"Remember You Young" – Thomas Rhett; Dir. TK McKamy**; "10,000 Hours" – Dan + Shay and Justin Bieber; Dir. Patrick Tracy; "God's Country" - Blake Shelton; Dir. Sophie Muller; "One Man Band" – Old Dominion; Dir. Mason Allen; "Sugar Coat" – Little Big Town; Dir. Alexa Kinigopoulos, Stephen Kinigopoulos
Music Event of the Year
**"Fooled Around and Fell in Love" – Miranda Lambert and Maren Morris, Ashley McBryde, Tenille Townes, Caylee Hammack, Elle King**; "10,000 Hours" – Dan + Shay and Justin Bieber; "Dive Bar" – Garth Brooks and Blake Shelton; "Old Town Road" – Lil Nas X and Billy Ray Cyrus; "What Happens in a Small Town" – Brantley Gilbert and Lindsay Ell

- There was a tie between Rhett and Underwood for Entertainer of the Year. The first tie in ACM award history.

== Performances ==
Performer(s)	Song(s)
Luke Bryan; Eric Church; Luke Combs; Thomas Rhett; Carrie Underwood	Entertainer of the Year Nominees Medley "Rain Is a Good Thing" (Bryan) "Drink in My Hand" (Church) "When It Rains It Pours" (Combs) "It Goes Like This" (Rhett) "Before He Cheats" (Underwood)
Jimmie Allen	"Make Me Want To"
Old Dominion	Medley of Hits "One Man Band" "Song for Another Time" "Hotel Key" "Make It Sweet"
Luke Bryan	"One Margarita"
Kelsea Ballerini	"Hole in the Bottle"
Miranda Lambert; Natalie Hemby; Luke Dick	"Bluebird"
Morgan Wallen	"Whiskey Glasses"
Thomas Rhett; Jon Pardi	"Beer Can't Fix"
Blake Shelton; Gwen Stefani	"Happy Anywhere"
Carrie Underwood	Tribute to the 95th Anniversary of the Grand Ole Opry "Crazy" "You Ain't Woman Enough (To Take My Man)" "I Was Country When Country Wasn't Cool" "Why'd You Come in Here Lookin' Like That" "The Night the Lights Went Out in Georgia" "A Broken Wing"
Luke Combs (in partnership with Ford)	"Better Together"
Tenille Townes	"Somebody's Daughter"
Gabby Barrett; Cade Foehner	"I Hope" "The Good Ones" (Xfinity exclusive)
Dan + Shay	"I Should Probably Go to Bed"
Riley Green	"I Wish Grandpas Never Died"
Kane Brown	"Worldwide Beautiful"
Maren Morris	"To Hell & Back"
Taylor Swift	"Betty"
Eric Church	"Ragged Old Flag" "Voice" "Stick That in Your Country Song"
Tim McGraw	"I Called Mama"
Mickey Guyton	"What Are You Gonna Tell Her?"
Keith Urban; Pink(prerecorded)	"One Too Many"
Trisha Yearwood	"I'll Carry You Home"
Florida Georgia Line	"I Love My Country"

== Presenters ==
Presenters were announced September 14, 2020, two days before the ceremony.

Award	Presenter(s)
Song of the Year	Bobby Bones
Single of the Year	Cam
Album of the Year	Darius Rucker
Top Vocal Group of the Year	Lily Aldridge
Top Male Artist of the Year	Lauren Alaina
Top Vocal Duo of the Year	Clint Black & Lisa Hartman Black
Top Female Artist of the Year	CeCe Winans
Entertainer of the Year	Keith Urban
