= Old Dominion =

Old Dominion most commonly refers to:

- The Old Dominion, a nickname for the U.S. Commonwealth of Virginia
  - Colony of Virginia
- Old Dominion University, a public university in Norfolk, Virginia
  - Old Dominion Monarchs, the athletic teams representing Old Dominion University
- Old Dominion, Virginia, an unincorporated community in Albemarle County, Virginia

Old Dominion may also refer to:

== Music ==
- Old Dominion (band), an American country-rock band
  - Old Dominion (EP)
  - Old Dominion (album)
- Old Dominion, an album by Hotel of the Laughing Tree
- "Old Dominion", a 2000 song by Avail from One Wrench
- "Old Dominion", a 2002 song by Enon from High Society

== Other uses ==
- Old Dominion (train), a former Amtrak passenger train in the United States
- Old Dominion Athletic Conference, an NCAA Division III athletic conference
- Old Dominion Brewing Company
- Old Dominion Electric Cooperative
- Old Dominion Foundation, a predecessor of the Andrew W. Mellon Foundation
- Old Dominion Freight Line
- Old Dominion (magazine), a magazine from 1870 to 1873
