= Old Dominion (EP) =

2014 EP by Old Dominion

EP by Old Dominion
- Released: October 7, 2014; May 5, 2015 (re-release)
- Genre: Country
- Length: 19:21
- Label: ReeSmack Records, RCA Nashville
- Producer: Shane McAnally

Old Dominion chronology
It Was Always Yours (2012)	Old Dominion (2014)	Meat and Candy (2015)

Singles from Old Dominion
- 1. "Shut Me Up" Released: 2014; 2. "Break Up with Him" Released: January 20, 2015

Old Dominion is the second extended play by the American country music band Old Dominion. It was released on October 7, 2014 by ReeSmack Records and later re-released on May 5, 2015 by RCA Records. The original release of the EP has six tracks, while the re-release has only five tracks. Old Dominion was preceded by the band's self-released debut EP, It Was Always Yours, in 2012, and was followed by the band's debut album, Meat and Candy, in 2015. Four of the tracks on Old Dominion were re-issued as part of Meat and Candy.

The lead single from Old Dominion, "Shut Me Up", was released in 2014 as the band's debut single. It peaked at number 58 on the Billboard Country Airplay chart. "Break Up with Him" was released as the second single from Old Dominion on January 20, 2015. It was re-released by RCA on May 11, 2015 as the lead single from Meat and Candy and topped the Country Airplay chart on November 14, 2015.

Old Dominion's third album is also self-titled and was released on October 25, 2019.

== Content ==
Four of the tracks on Old Dominion's self-titled EP - "Break Up with Him", "Nowhere Fast", "Beer Can in a Truck Bed", and "Wrong Turns - were reissued as part of the band's 2015 debut album, Meat and Candy. The two tracks exclusive to the EP are "Shut Me Up" and "Dirt on a Road". The latter track is exclusive to the ReeSmack Records release of the EP.

== Track listing ==
ReeSmack Records release
No.	Title	Writer(s)	Length
1.	"Shut Me Up"	Andrew Dorff; Matthew Ramsey; Brad Tursi	2:51
2.	"Break Up with Him"	Ramsey; Trevor Rosen; Whit Sellers; Geoff Sprung; Tursi	3:28
3.	"Nowhere Fast"	Matt Jenkins; Ramsey; Rosen	3:09
4.	"Beer Can in a Truck Bed"	Jenkins; Ramsey; Rosen	3:22
5.	"Wrong Turns"	Jenkins; Ramsey; Rosen	3:30
6.	"Dirt on a Road"	Ramsey; Rosen	3:01

RCA re-release
No.	Title	Writer(s)	Length
1.	"Shut Me Up"	Dorff; Ramsey; Tursi	2:51
2.	"Break Up with Him"	Ramsey; Rosen; Sellers; Sprung; Tursi	3:28
3.	"Nowhere Fast"	Matt Jenkins; Ramsey; Rosen	3:09
4.	"Beer Can in a Truck Bed"	Jenkins; Ramsey; Rosen	3:22
5.	"Wrong Turns"	Jenkins; Ramsey; Rosen	3:30

== Reception ==
After the ReeSmack Records release of Old Dominion's self-titled EP, Marissa R. Moss of Rolling Stone named the band one of the ten "most captivating newcomers" in country music. Highlighting the "twangy arena -rock of the EP's lead single, "Shut Me Up", she compared Old Dominion to Keith Urban, Little Big Town, Sam Hunt, and Parmalee, while writing, "They're building on the country-band blueprint set by the likes of Alabama and adding some fuzzy guitars, catchy licks and even a little rap that shoots for stadiums, not saloons."

After the RCA release of the EP, Timothy Monger of AllMusic called Old Dominion a "set of hooky, radio-ready songs" and felt that the band succeeded at mixing "a distinctly Nashville sound with plenty of rock energy, pop melodies, and even traces of hip-hop."

== Charts ==
Chart (2014)	Peak position
US Billboard 200	148
US Top Country Albums (Billboard)	33
US Heatseekers Albums (Billboard)	9
