= Coming Home (Old Dominion song) =

Single by Old Dominion

from the album Odies but Goodies
- Released: July 1, 2024
- Recorded: Sound Emporium Studios, Nashville, Tennessee
- Genre: Country
- Length: 2:50
- Label: Columbia Nashville
- Songwriters: Brad Tursi; Shane McAnally; Matthew Ramsey; Trevor Rosen; Geoff Sprung; Whit Sellers
- Producers: Old Dominion; Shane McAnally

Old Dominion singles chronology
"Can't Break Up Now" (2023)	"Coming Home" (2024)	"Making Good Time" (2025)

Music video
- "Coming Home" on YouTube

"Coming Home" is a song by American country music band Old Dominion. It was released on July 1, 2024, as the lead single to the band's first compilation album, Odies but Goodies.

== Content ==
The members of Old Dominion co-wrote and co-produced "Coming Home" with Shane McAnally, who was inspired to develop the hook after reading a book about the Vietnam War. The song compares a soldier coming home from war to the feeling of road musicians returning home from tour, something Old Dominion related to.

== Music video ==
The music video for "Coming Home" premiered on September 6, 2024. The video utilized footage from a performance by Old Dominion for members of the United States Armed Forces on July 29, 2024, aboard the USS Gerald R. Ford in Norfolk, Virginia.

== Chart performance ==
"Coming Home" pulled in 81 first-week adds at country radio upon impact and debuted at number 24 on the Billboard Country Airplay chart dated July 13, 2024. It peaked at number 16 in April 2025.

== Charts ==
=== Weekly charts ===
Weekly chart performance for "Coming Home"
Chart (2024–2025)	Peak position
Canada Country (Billboard)	42
US Country Airplay (Billboard)	16
US Hot Country Songs (Billboard)	42

=== Year-end charts ===
Year-end chart performance for "Coming Home"
Chart (2025)	Position
US Country Airplay (Billboard)	55
