= Barbara (Old Dominion album) =

Studio album by Old Dominion
- Released: August 22, 2025
- Genre: Country
- Length: 41:19
- Label: RCA Nashville
- Producer: Shane McAnally; Ross Copperman; Old Dominion

Old Dominion chronology
Odies but Goodies (2024)	Barbara (2025)

Singles from Barbara
- 1. "Making Good Time" Released: August 4, 2025

Barbara is the sixth studio album by American country music band Old Dominion. It was released on August 22, 2025, via Sony Music Nashville's RCA Nashville imprint. "Making Good Time" was released as the album's lead and only single on August 4, 2025.

== Track listing ==
Barbara track listing
No.	Title	Writer(s)	Producer(s)	Length
1.	"Making Good Time"	Ross Copperman; Ross Ellis; Matthew Ramsey; Trevor Rosen; Brad Tursi	Old Dominion; Ross Copperman; Shane McAnally	2:47
2.	"Water My Flowers"	Jerry Flowers; Ramsey; Jordan Reynolds; Rosen	Old Dominion; McAnally	3:40
3.	"Me Most Nights"	Copperman; Ramsey; Rosen; Tursi	Old Dominion; Copperman; Shane McAnally	2:39
4.	"Man or the Song"	Copperman; Shane McAnally; Ramsey; Rosen; Tursi	Old Dominion; McAnally	2:49
5.	"Break Your Mama's Heart"	Josh Osborne; Ramsey; Rosen; Tursi	Old Dominion; McAnally	3:01
6.	"Miss You Man"	Copperman; Matt Jenkins; Ramsey; Rosen	Old Dominion; McAnally	3:24
7.	"Talk Country"	Matthew Dragstrem; Ramsey; Rosen; Tursi	Old Dominion; McAnally	3:15
8.	"Late Great Heartbreak"	McAnally; Osborne; Ramsey; Rosen	Old Dominion; McAnally	3:36
9.	"Crying in a Beach Bar"	Copperman; Jenkins; Ramsey; Rosen	Old Dominion; McAnally	3:18
10.	"One of Us"	McAnally; Osborne; Ramsey; Rosen; Tursi	Old Dominion; McAnally	3:13
11.	"What Doesn't Kill a Memory"	Jordan Minton; Mark Trussell; Tursi	Old Dominion; McAnally	3:09
12.	"Sip in the Right Direction"	Ashley Gorley; Ben Johnson; Ramsey; Rosen; Tursi	Old Dominion; McAnally	2:50
13.	"Goodnight Music City"	Jesse Frasure; Ramsey; Rosen; Tursi	Old Dominion; McAnally	3:34
Total length:				41:19

== Charts ==
Weekly chart performance for Barbara
Chart (2025)	Peak position
US Billboard 200	136
US Top Country Albums (Billboard)	29
