= Memory Lane =

Memory Lane may refer to:

== Film and television ==
- Memory Lane (2024 film), a 2024 comedy drama film directed by Jelle de Jong
- Memory Lane (2012 film), a 2012 science-fiction film directed by Shawn Holmes
- Memory Lane (2010 film), a 2010 drama film directed by Mikhaël Hers
- Memory Lane (1926 film), a 1926 silent film starring Eleanor Boardman
- Brian "Memory" Lane, a character in the BBC television drama series New Tricks, played by Alun Armstrong
- "Memory Lane" (The Vampire Diaries) an episode of the TV series The Vampire Diaries

== Music ==
- Memory Lane (album), a 2023 album by Old Dominion
  - "Memory Lane" (song), the album's title track
- Memory Lane, a 2010 album by The High Kings
- Memory Lane: The Best of McFly, 2012
- "Memory Lane", a 1979 song by Minnie Riperton from the album Minnie
- "Memory Lane", a song by Bugzy Malone
- "Memory Lane", a song by Elliott Smith from the album From a Basement on the Hill
- "Memory Lane", a song by McFly from the album Wonderland
- "Memory Lane", a song by Tim McGraw from the album Tim McGraw
- "Memory Lane (Sittin' in da Park)", a song by Nas from the album Illmatic

== Other uses ==
- Memory Lane (Denton, Maryland), a house on the U.S. National Register of Historic Places
- Memory Lane (audio drama), a Doctor Who audio drama
- Memory Lane, Inc, the company that operates classmates.com, a social media website
- Memory Lane Music Group, New York-based music publishing company founded in 1923

== See also ==
- Memory
