= Seminary (disambiguation) =

A seminary is a school of theology.

Seminary may also refer to:

== Places ==
- Seminary, Mississippi, a town in Covington County
- Seminary, Oakland, California, a neighborhood in East Oakland
- Seminary, Virginia, an unincorporated community in Lee County
- Seminary Township, Fayette County, Illinois

== Other uses ==
- Seminary Garden, a garden in Prague, Czech Republic
- Seminary Magazine, a 1863–1873 literary publication in Richmond, Virginia
- Seminary Ridge, Gettysburg, Pennsylvania, a dendritic ridge and 1863 battlefield
- The Seminary (Lithonia, Georgia), a historic building
- Base 0.5, a numerical system which is the opposite of binary.

== See also ==
- Seminar (disambiguation)
