= I Met a Girl =

I Met a Girl may refer to:

- "I Met a Girl", song by Dean Martin From the Broadway Show "Bells Are Ringing" (1956)
- "I Met a Girl", sung by The Shadows, written by Hank Marvin
- "I Met a Girl" (William Michael Morgan song)
- I Met a Girl (film), a 2020 Australian romantic drama film
