= Memory Lane (album) =

Studio album by Old Dominion
- Released: October 6, 2023
- Genre: Country
- Length: 54:01
- Label: RCA Nashville
- Producer: Shane McAnally; Ross Copperman; Old Dominion

Old Dominion chronology
Time, Tequila & Therapy (2021)	Memory Lane (2023)	Odies but Goodies (2024)

Singles from Memory Lane
- 1. "Memory Lane" Released: January 5, 2023; 2. "Can't Break Up Now" Released: September 18, 2023

Memory Lane is the fifth studio album by American country music band Old Dominion. It was released on October 6, 2023, via Sony Music Nashville's RCA Nashville imprint. It was preceded by the release of its title track and "Can't Break Up Now".

== Content ==
Memory Lane, which was originally issued as an EP of the same name, features 18 songs in its tracklisting, including collaborations with Megan Moroney ("Can't Break Up Now") and Blake Shelton ("Ain't Got a Worry").

== Track listing ==
Memory Lane track listing
No.	Title	Writer(s)	Producer(s)	Length
1.	"Stay Drunk"	Josh Osborne; Matthew Ramsey; Trevor Rosen; Brad Tursi	Old Dominion; Ross Copperman	3:08
2.	"A Million Things"	Lori McKenna; Ramsey; Tursi	Old Dominion; Copperman	3:11
3.	"Memory Lane"	Jessie Jo Dillon; Ramsey; Rosen; Tursi	Old Dominion; Shane McAnally	2:52
4.	"Different About You"	Zach Crowell; Ramsey; Rosen; Tursi	Old Dominion; Copperman	2:40
5.	"Can't Break Up Now" (with Megan Moroney)	Tofer Brown; Ramsey; Rosen; Emily Weisband	Old Dominion; Copperman; Kristian Bush^{[v]}	3:20
6.	"I Should Have Married You"	Shane McAnally; Ramsey; Rosen; Whit Sellers; Geoff Sprung; Tursi	Old Dominion; McAnally	2:43
7.	"Both Sides of the Bed"	Jesse Frasure; Ramsey; Rosen; Tursi	Old Dominion; Copperman	2:30
8.	"How Good Is That"	Ross Copperman; Osborne; Ramsey; Rosen; Tursi	Old Dominion; McAnally	2:54
9.	"Some Horses"	Matt Jenkins; McAnally	Old Dominion; McAnally	3:43
10.	"Easy to Miss"	Matt Dragstrem; Osborne; Ramsey; Rosen	Old Dominion; McAnally	2:50
11.	"Sleep Without Drinking"	Jordan Schmidt; Tursi; Craig Wiseman	Old Dominion; Copperman	3:05
12.	"Beautiful Sky"	Osborne; Ramsey; Rosen; Tursi	Old Dominion; Copperman	3:24
13.	"Love Drunk and Happy"	Dillon; Dragstrem; Ramsey; Rosen	Old Dominion; McAnally	2:57
14.	"Ain't Got a Worry"	McAnally; Osborne; Ramsey; Rosen; Tursi	Old Dominion; McAnally	2:28
15.	"Easier Said with Rum"	Jenkins; Chase McGill; Ramsey; Tursi	Old Dominion; McAnally	3:22
16.	"Hot Again"	McAnally; Osborne; Ramsey; Rosen; Tursi	Old Dominion; McAnally	3:09
17.	"Freedom like You"	Jordan Davis; Ramsey; Rosen; Tursi	Old Dominion; McAnally	3:08
18.	"Ain't Got a Worry" (featuring Blake Shelton)	McAnally; Osborne; Ramsey; Rosen; Tursi	Old Dominion; McAnally	2:28
Total length:				54:01

Note

- ^{^[v]} signifies a vocal producer.

== Personnel ==
Old Dominion

- Matthew Ramsey – lead vocals (all tracks), electric guitar (tracks 1, 15, 17), background vocals (3, 4, 6, 8–10, 13, 14, 16–18), clapping (6, 14, 18), percussion (16)
- Trevor Rosen – acoustic guitar (tracks 1, 3–6, 9–11, 13–18), clapping (6, 14, 18), piano (6), background vocals (8), twelve-string guitar (12)
- Whit Sellers – drums (tracks 1–11, 13–18), percussion (1–4, 6, 9, 12, 17), clapping (6, 14, 18), programming (8, 16), congas (14, 18)
- Geoff Sprung – bass guitar, production (all tracks); clapping (tracks 6, 14, 18)
- Brad Tursi – background vocals (tracks 1–4, 6–18), electric guitar (1–5, 7–18), percussion (1), acoustic guitar (2, 3, 8, 12–14, 18), banjo (2), clapping (6, 14, 18), slide guitar (8)

Additional musicians

- Justin Niebank – programming (all tracks), pedal steel guitar (track 7), synthesizer (11)
- Dave Cohen – organ (tracks 1, 3–7, 10–12, 14, 17, 18), synthesizer (1–3, 8–11, 13, 15–17), piano (5, 8), strings (16)
- Ilya Toshinskiy – mandolin (track 3)
- David Huff – programming (tracks 3, 11, 16)
- Megan Moroney – vocals (track 5)
- Blake Shelton – vocals (track 18)

Technical

- Joe LaPorta – mastering
- Justin Niebank – mixing, engineering (all tracks); overdub engineering (tracks 1, 2, 4–13, 17), editing (3, 6, 8–10, 13–18)
- Sean Badum – engineering (all tracks), overdub engineering (tracks 1, 2, 4–8, 10–13, 17)
- Brian David Willis – editing
- David Huff – editing (tracks 3, 11, 16)
- Kam Luchterhand – vocal engineering (tracks 8, 13, 17)
- Drew Bollman – engineering assistance
- David Paulin – engineering assistance (tracks 1, 2, 4, 5, 7, 11, 12)
- Seth Morton – engineering assistance (tracks 1, 2, 4, 5, 7, 11, 12)
- Joel McKenney – engineering assistance (tracks 6, 8–10, 13, 17)
- Nicholas Moegly – cover art

== Charts ==
=== Weekly charts ===
Weekly chart performance for Memory Lane
Chart (2023)	Peak position
US Billboard 200	56
US Top Country Albums (Billboard)	13

=== Year-end charts ===
Year-end chart performance for Memory Lane
Chart (2023)	Position
US Top Country Albums (Billboard)	71
