= Time, Tequila & Therapy =

Studio album by Old Dominion
- Released: October 8, 2021
- Genre: Country
- Length: 39:08
- Label: RCA Nashville
- Producer: Shane McAnally, Old Dominion

Old Dominion chronology
| Old Dominion (2019) | Time, Tequila & Therapy (2021) | Memory Lane (2023) |

Singles from Time, Tequila & Therapy
- 1. "I Was on a Boat That Day" Released: May 21, 2021; 2. "Hawaii" Released: September 17, 2021; 3. "No Hard Feelings" Released: December 13, 2021

Time, Tequila & Therapy is the fourth studio album by American country music band Old Dominion. It was released on October 8, 2021 via Sony Music Nashville's RCA Nashville imprint. Produced by the band alongside Shane McAnally, the album features the singles "I Was on a Boat That Day" and "No Hard Feelings", and a collaboration with Gladys Knight.

== Content ==
The five members of Old Dominion (Trevor Rosen, Matthew Ramsey, Whit Sellers, Geoff Sprung, and Brad Tursi) wrote the songs for Time, Tequila & Therapy during a retreat in Asheville, North Carolina, in 2021. The five had not seen each other frequently due to the COVID-19 pandemic, and decided to get together because they had not seen each other in several months. The five of them wrote and recorded in their studio with their usual producer, Shane McAnally. The band chose "I Was on a Boat That Day" as the lead single; according to Rosen, the song was recorded from "the first couple of takes" after each of the band members had consumed a shot of tequila. In the process of recording Lonely Side of Town, the band thought that the song had a Motown influence, and offhandedly remarked that Gladys Knight should be featured on it. Through the owner of the studio, they were able to contact Knight, who agreed to appear on the song.

== Critical reception ==
Matt Bjorke of Roughstock reviewed the album favorably, highlighting the lead single and the Gladys Knight collaboration as two of the standout tracks. He described it as a "record that demands your attention. It’s a record that entertains and it’s right up there with the best of the contemporary country music records to be released in 2021." Will Groff of Holler was less favorable, writing that the album is "so uniformly easy-breezy, that it’s hard not to feel like the band is prizing vibes over substance." He described I Wanna Live in a House with You Forever and All I Know About Girls as two of the album’s weaker tracks, writing that the latter is a "frustrating lapse into the 'hey, girl' ethos of their earlier singles."

== Track listing ==
All tracks are written by Old Dominion (Matthew Ramsey, Trevor Rosen, Whit Sellers, Geoff Sprung, Brad Tursi), Shane McAnally, and Josh Osborne, except as noted.

| No. | Title | Writer(s) | Length |
|---|---|---|---|
| 1. | "Why Are You Still Here" | Ramsey; Rosen; Sellers; Sprung; Tursi; McAnally | 2:53 |
| 2. | "Hawaii" | | 2:56 |
| 3. | "Walk on Whiskey" | | 3:08 |
| 4. | "All I Know About Girls" | | 2:44 |
| 5. | "Blue Jeans" | Ramsey; Rosen; Sellers; Sprung; Tursi; McAnally | 2:17 |
| 6. | "No Hard Feelings" | Ramsey; Rosen; Sellers; Sprung; Tursi; McAnally | 3:11 |
| 7. | "Lonely Side of Town" (featuring Gladys Knight) | | 4:09 |
| 8. | "I Was on a Boat That Day" | | 2:58 |
| 9. | "Drinking My Feelings" | | 3:29 |
| 10. | "Something's the Same About You" | | 3:21 |
| 11. | "I Wanna Live in a House with You Forever" | Ramsey; Rosen; Sellers; Sprung; Tursi; McAnally; Matt Jenkins; Osborne | 2:43 |
| 12. | "Don't Forget Me" | Ramsey; Rosen; Sellers; Sprung; Tursi; Jenkins; McAnally | 3:14 |
| 13. | "Ain't Nothing Wrong with Love" | | 2:56 |
| Total length: | | | 39:08 |

== Charts ==
=== Weekly charts ===
Weekly chart performance for Time, Tequila & Therapy
| Chart (2021) | Peak position |
|---|---|
| Canadian Albums (Billboard) | 37 |
| US Billboard 200 | 27 |
| US Top Country Albums (Billboard) | 4 |

=== Year-end charts ===
Year-end chart performance for Time, Tequila & Therapy
| Chart (2021) | Position |
|---|---|
| US Top Country Albums (Billboard) | 87 |
