= Some People Do =

2020 song by Old Dominion

Single by Old Dominion

from the album Old Dominion
- Released: March 2, 2020
- Genre: Country; ballad
- Length: 3:14
- Label: RCA Nashville
- Songwriters: Matthew Ramsey; Jesse Frasure; Shane McAnally; Thomas Rhett
- Producer: Shane McAnally

Old Dominion singles chronology
"One Man Band" (2019)	"Some People Do" (2020)	"Never Be Sorry" (2020)

Music video
- "Some People Do" on YouTube

"Some People Do" is a song recorded by American country music band Old Dominion. It was released on March 2, 2020 as the third single from their self-titled third studio album. The song was written by Matthew Ramsey, Jesse Frasure, Shane McAnally, Thomas Rhett and produced by McAnally. It received a Grammy Award nomination for Best Country Duo/Group Performance.

== Background ==
Band wrote on Twitter: “This song is a side of us we haven’t shown as blatantly, and it’s a little scary to put out into the world, but part of our job as songwriters is to tell the truth, even if it’s hard to go there.”

== Music ==
Matt Ramsey wrote on Instagram: “It’s a breaking-point kind of song. I think inherently we’re all good people and want to be good people, but no matter who you are, sometimes you hurt the ones you love, It’s about that desire to be the best person you can be for those people.”

The song featured a poignant piano melody and strings that fit with the reflective and heartbreaking lyrics.

== Music video ==
The music video was released on April 3, 2020, directed by Mason Allen. It was inspired by Jason Schneidman, celebrity groomer who was once homeless, but changed his life around after battling drug addiction and found Old Dominion joining Schneidman to help his Men’s Groomer Foundation in Los Angeles.

In the music video, Schneidman and the band gave out free haircuts and hot meals to the local homeless community.

== Commercial performance ==
As of July 2019, the song has sold 15,000 copies in the United States. It peaked at number 28 on the Billboard Country Airplay chart and number 38 on the Hot Country Songs chart, becoming Old Dominion's lowest-charting single since their debut single, "Shut Me Up", in 2014, and their first single to miss number one since “Snapback” in 2016.

== Charts ==
=== Weekly charts ===
Chart (2020)	Peak position
Canada Country (Billboard)	45
US Country Airplay (Billboard)	28
US Hot Country Songs (Billboard)	38

=== Year-end charts ===
Chart (2020)	Position
US Hot Country Songs (Billboard)	93

== Certifications ==
Region	Certification	Certified units/sales
United States (RIAA)	Gold	500,000^{‡}
^{‡} Sales+streaming figures based on certification alone.
