= Can't Break Up Now =

Single by Old Dominion and Megan Moroney

from the album Memory Lane
- Released: September 18, 2023
- Genre: Country
- Length: 3:20
- Label: Arista Nashville; Columbia Nashville
- Songwriters: Tofer Brown; Matthew Ramsey; Trevor Rosen; Emily Weisband
- Producers: Old Dominion; Ross Copperman

Old Dominion singles chronology
"Memory Lane" (2023)	"Can't Break Up Now" (2023)	"Coming Home" (2024)

Megan Moroney singles chronology
"I'm Not Pretty" (2023)	"Can't Break Up Now" (2023)	"Am I Okay?" (2024)

Music video
- "Can't Break Up Now" on YouTube

"Can't Break Up Now" is a song by American country music band Old Dominion and American country music singer Megan Moroney. It was released on September 18, 2023, as the second single to the band's fifth studio album, Memory Lane.

== Content ==
The song is a duet with Megan Moroney. Old Dominion's Matthew Ramsey spoke favorably of Moroney's involvement on the song, highlighting her intuition as a singer-songwriter, saying "I think we all loved the way she creates a song, her sense of how notes flow, but she's both songwriter/singer who came in and pushed this song to almost a scene from a movie". It was co-written by Ramsey and fellow band member Trevor Rosen with Tofer Brown and Emily Weisband.

== Music video ==
The music video for "Can't Break Up Now" was directed by Mason Allen and Nicki Fletcher and premiered on October 2, 2023. Described as capturing "the realities of life on the road", it depicts Moroney preparing for a show at the vanity in her dressing room before showing Ramsey reflecting out the window of his tour bus, and culminating in an on-stage performance between the two with the rest of the band joining them.

== Charts ==
=== Weekly charts ===
Weekly chart performance for "Can't Break Up Now"
Chart (2023–2024)	Peak position
Canada Country (Billboard)	44
US Country Airplay (Billboard)	19
US Hot Country Songs (Billboard)	42

=== Year-end charts ===
2024 year-end chart performance for "Can't Break Up Now"
Chart (2024)	Position
US Country Airplay (Billboard)	59
