= Seminar (disambiguation) =

Seminar is a form of academic instruction, either at an academic institution or offered by a commercial or professional organization.

Seminar may refer to:

- Seminar (play), a 2011 Broadway play by Theresa Rebeck
- Seminar (album), 1989 album by Sir Mix-a-Lot
- "The Seminar" (The Office), a 2011 episode American comedy television series The Office
- Seminar, monthly journal established in 1959 by Romesh Thapar and Raj Thapar

== See also ==
- Seminary (disambiguation)
