= Vinyl (William Michael Morgan album) =

Studio album by William Michael Morgan
- Released: September 30, 2016
- Genre: Country
- Length: 38:29
- Label: Warner Bros. Nashville
- Producer: Jimmy Ritchey; Scott Hendricks

William Michael Morgan chronology
| William Michael Morgan EP (2016) | Vinyl (2016) |

Singles from Vinyl
- 1. "I Met a Girl" Released: August 19, 2015; 2. "Missing" Released: November 7, 2016; 3. "Vinyl" Released: October 2, 2017

Vinyl is the debut studio album by American country music singer William Michael Morgan. It was released on September 30, 2016, by Warner Bros. Nashville. The album has produced three singles, "I Met a Girl", "Missing" and "Vinyl". Morgan co-wrote two of the album's 11 tracks.

== Commercial performance ==
Vinyl debuted at number five on the Top Country Albums chart, and number 65 on the US Billboard 200. The album has sold 30,600 copies as of July 2017.

== Track listing ==
| No. | Title | Writer(s) | Length |
|---|---|---|---|
| 1. | "People Like Me" | Kelley Lovelace; Lee Thomas Miller | 3:47 |
| 2. | "Vinyl" | Carson Chamberlain; Ashley Gorley; Wade Kirby | 3:19 |
| 3. | "Missing" | Mark Irwin; Andrew Dorff; Josh Kear | 3:46 |
| 4. | "I Met a Girl" | Sam Hunt; Trevor Rosen; Shane McAnally | 3:22 |
| 5. | "Spend It All on You" | Greg Bates; Jon Mabe; Jimmy Ritchey | 3:36 |
| 6. | "Beer Drinker" | David Lee; Don Poythress; Wynn Varble | 3:03 |
| 7. | "I Know Who He Is" | Casey Beathard; Eric Church | 3:45 |
| 8. | "Cheap Cologne" | Odie Blackmon; Kevin Denney; Ritchey | 3:28 |
| 9. | "Somethin' to Drink About" | William Michael Morgan; Kirby; Phil O'Donnell | 3:09 |
| 10. | "Lonesomeville" | Morgan; Mark Sherill; Trent Tomlinson; Ashe Underwood | 3:16 |
| 11. | "Back Seat Driver" | Robert Counts; Nicolette Hayford; Matt Willis | 3:58 |
| Total length: | | | 38:29 |

== Personnel ==
- Shannon Forrest - drums
- Larry Franklin - fiddle
- Paul Franklin - lap steel guitar, pedal steel guitar
- Aubrey Haynie - fiddle, mandolin
- Wes Hightower - background vocals
- Brent Mason - electric guitar
- William Michael Morgan - lead vocals
- Gordon Mote - keyboards
- Jimmy Ritchey - banjo, acoustic guitar, baritone guitar
- Jimmie Lee Sloas - bass guitar
- Ilya Toshinsky - banjo, acoustic guitar
- Glenn Worf - bass guitar

== Charts ==
| Chart (2016) | Peak position |
|---|---|
| US Billboard 200 | 65 |
| US Top Country Albums (Billboard) | 5 |
