= I Was on a Boat That Day =

2021 song by Old Dominion

Single by Old Dominion

from the album Time, Tequila & Therapy
- Released: May 21, 2021
- Genre: Country
- Length: 2:58
- Label: RCA Nashville
- Songwriters: Brad Tursi; Shane McAnally; Geoff Sprung; Josh Osborne; Matthew Ramsey; Trevor Rosen; Whit Sellers
- Producers: Old Dominion; Shane McAnally

Old Dominion singles chronology
"Never Be Sorry" (2020)	"I Was on a Boat That Day" (2021)	"No Hard Feelings" (2021)

Music video
- "I Was on a Boat That Day" on YouTube

"I Was on a Boat That Day" is a song recorded by American country music band Old Dominion. It was released on May 21, 2021 as the lead single from their fourth studio album Time, Tequila & Therapy. The song was written by each member of Old Dominion, Shane McAnally, Josh Osborne, and produced by McAnally and Old Dominion.

== Composition ==
I Was on a Boat That Day is in the key of B major.

== Content ==
"I Was on a Boat That Day" is a summer party anthem with "joyful ad-libs, raucous instrumentation, and [...] classically Old Dominion rhythms and rhymes".

Lead vocalist Matthew Ramsey said the idea started around six or seven years ago, he told KFDI: “We were kicking it around for a long time. We’d bring it up and shoot it down I don’t know how many times we decided not to write this song.”

In a press release, Ramsey mentioned: "When you listen to 'I Was On a Boat That Day' you are hearing us in the full joy of making music together, from the moment I counted the band off we were smiling from beginning to end. The tequila was flowing, the laughter was loud, and we knew in that moment we were creating something that would bring people as much joy as it was bringing us."

== Music video ==
The music video, directed by Mason Allen, was uploaded on May 21, 2021. Clips show partygoers dancing and smiling, and the band members performing the song on a boat.

== Charts ==
=== Weekly charts ===
Weekly chart performance for "I Was on a Boat That Day"
Chart (2021)	Peak position
Australia Country Hot 50 (TMN)	30
Canada Hot 100 (Billboard)	44
Canada Country (Billboard)	1
US Billboard Hot 100	37
US Country Airplay (Billboard)	9
US Hot Country Songs (Billboard)	8

=== Year-end charts ===
Year-end chart performance for "I Was on a Boat That Day"
Chart (2021)	Position
US Country Airplay (Billboard)	37
US Hot Country Songs (Billboard)	36

== Certifications ==
Region	Certification	Certified units/sales
United States (RIAA)	Platinum	1,000,000^{‡}
^{‡} Sales+streaming figures based on certification alone.
