= No Hard Feelings (song) =

2021 song by Old Dominion

Single by Old Dominion

from the album Time, Tequila & Therapy
- Released: December 13, 2021
- Genre: Country
- Length: 3:11
- Label: RCA Nashville
- Songwriters: Brad Tursi; Shane McAnally; Geoff Sprung; Matthew Ramsey; Trevor Rosen; Whit Sellers
- Producers: Old Dominion; Shane McAnally

Old Dominion singles chronology
"I Was on a Boat That Day" (2021)	"No Hard Feelings" (2021)	"Beer with My Friends" (2022)

"No Hard Feelings" is a song by American country music band Old Dominion. It was released in December 2021 as the second single from their 2021 album Time, Tequila & Therapy.

== Content ==
The song is about a man recovering from a breakup. He describes his attempts to recover with the phrase "time, tequila, and therapy", which provided the album's title. All five band members wrote the song with Shane McAnally, with whom they also produced it. Lead singer Matthew Ramsey described the song as "a serious song, but it does have a little bit of an uplifting quality to it".

== Charts ==
=== Weekly charts ===
Weekly chart performance for "No Hard Feelings"
Chart (2021–2022)	Peak position
Canada Hot 100 (Billboard)	54
Canada Country (Billboard)	4
US Bubbling Under Hot 100 (Billboard)	1
US Country Airplay (Billboard)	14
US Hot Country Songs (Billboard)	24

=== Year-end charts ===
2022 year-end chart performance for "No Hard Feelings"
Chart (2022)	Position
US Country Airplay (Billboard)	57
US Hot Country Songs (Billboard)	65

== Certifications ==
Region	Certification	Certified units/sales
United States (RIAA)	Gold	500,000^{‡}
^{‡} Sales+streaming figures based on certification alone.
