= Memory Lane (song) =

Single by Old Dominion

from the album Memory Lane
- Released: January 5, 2023
- Genre: Country
- Length: 2:53
- Label: Arista Nashville, Columbia Nashville
- Songwriters: Matthew Ramsey; Trevor Rosen; Brad Tursi; Jessie Jo Dillon
- Producer: Shane McAnally

Old Dominion singles chronology
"No Hard Feelings" (2021)	"Memory Lane" (2023)	"Can't Break Up Now" (2023)

Music video
- "Memory Lane" on YouTube

"Memory Lane" is a song by American country music band Old Dominion. It was released on January 5, 2023 as the lead single to the band's fifth studio album of the same name.

== History ==
Old Dominion released "Memory Lane" on January 5, 2023. Band members Matthew Ramsey, Trevor Rosen, and Brad Tursi wrote the song with Jessie Jo Dillon. Ramsey described the song as having a "nostalgic" theme for "memories of simpler times". Billy Dukes of Taste of Country wrote that the song "is bittersweet defined. A warm, traveling guitar beat drives you to a second verse that lets you down easy. Like the lover singer Matt Ramsey is describing, the beat just keeps on driving after that."

The band's label, Arista Nashville, closed partway through the single's release, so distribution rights were taken over by Columbia Nashville in March 2023.

== Music video ==
The music video for "Memory Lane" premiered on March 22, 2023 and was directed by Mason Allen and Nicki Fletcher.

== Charts ==
=== Weekly charts ===
Weekly chart performance for "Memory Lane"
Chart (2023)	Peak position
Canada Hot 100 (Billboard)	47
Canada Country (Billboard)	1
US Billboard Hot 100	27
US Country Airplay (Billboard)	4
US Hot Country Songs (Billboard)	7

=== Year-end charts ===
Year-end chart performance for "Memory Lane"
Chart (2023)	Position
US Billboard Hot 100	87
US Country Airplay (Billboard)	25
US Hot Country Songs (Billboard)	27

== Certifications ==
Region	Certification	Certified units/sales
New Zealand (RMNZ)	Gold	15,000^{‡}
United States (RIAA)	2× Platinum	2,000,000^{‡}
^{‡} Sales+streaming figures based on certification alone.
