= Happy Endings (album) =

Studio album by Old Dominion
- Released: August 25, 2017
- Genre: Country
- Length: 38:48
- Label: RCA Nashville
- Producer: Shane McAnally

Old Dominion chronology
Meat and Candy (2015)	Happy Endings (2017)	Old Dominion (2019)

Singles from Happy Endings
- 1. "No Such Thing as a Broken Heart" Released: March 10, 2017; 2. "Written in the Sand" Released: September 18, 2017; 3. "Hotel Key" Released: April 9, 2018

Happy Endings is the second studio album by American country music band Old Dominion. It was released on August 25, 2017 by RCA Nashville. In late 2017, the band hosted a dive bar tour in support of the record.

== Critical reception ==
Stephen Thomas Erlewine of AllMusic wrote that "Since Happy Endings flows so easily, it may be easy to glide along with its slick surfaces, but a close listen reveals not only the sturdiness of the songs but the cleverness of the production", rating it 4 out of 5 stars. Cillea Houghton of Sounds Like Nashville reviewed the album with favor, stating that "The album finds them in a slightly more poignant place than on 2015's Meat and Candy, while still flaunting their clever personalities and unique songwriting style."

== Commercial performance ==
The album debuted at No. 1 on Top Country Albums, selling 31,000 copies, and 41,000 equivalent album units when streaming and track sales are included. It also debuted on Billboard 200 at No. 7. It has sold 107,400 copies in the US as of February 2019.

== Track listing ==
Track listing from Rolling Stone.

No.	Title	Writer(s)	Length
1.	"No Such Thing as a Broken Heart"	Matthew Ramsey; Trevor Rosen; Brad Tursi; Jesse Frasure	2:57
2.	"Shoe Shopping"	Ramsey; Luke Laird; Shane McAnally	3:43
3.	"Not Everything's About You"	Ramsey; Rosen; Tursi; Andrew Dorff	3:55
4.	"Hotel Key"	Ramsey; Rosen; Josh Osborne	2:47
5.	"Be with Me"	Ramsey; Tursi; Ross Copperman	2:51
6.	"Written in the Sand"	Ramsey; Rosen; Tursi; McAnally	3:06
7.	"So You Go"	Ramsey; Rosen; Tursi; Dorff	2:48
8.	"Stars in the City" (featuring Little Big Town)	Ramsey; Rosen; Tursi; Osborne	3:20
9.	"New York at Night"	Rosen; Tursi; Jordan Schmidt	3:35
10.	"A Girl Is a Gun"	Ramsey; Rosen; Tursi; Matt Jenkins	2:56
11.	"Still Writing Songs About You"	Ramsey; Rosen; Tursi; McAnally	3:37
12.	"Can't Get You" (live)	Ramsey; Dorff; Osborne	3:13
Total length:			38:48

== Personnel ==
Adapted from AllMusic

=== Old Dominion ===
- Matthew Ramsey - electric guitar, lead vocals, background vocals
- Trevor Rosen - acoustic guitar, keyboards, background vocals
- Whit Sellers - drums, percussion, background vocals
- Geoff Sprung - bass guitar, synthesizer bass, background vocals
- Brad Tursi - electric guitar, background vocals

=== Additional Musicians ===
- Dave Cohen - keyboards
- Kris Donegan - acoustic guitar, electric guitar
- Ryan Gore - percussion, programming
- Little Big Town - background vocals on "Stars in the City"

== Charts ==
=== Weekly charts ===
Chart (2017–18)	Peak position
Australian Albums (ARIA)	84
Canadian Albums (Billboard)	12
New Zealand Heatseeker Albums (RMNZ)	9
UK Country Albums (OCC)	3
US Billboard 200	7
US Top Country Albums (Billboard)	1

=== Year-end charts ===
Chart (2017)	Position
US Top Country Albums (Billboard)	44
Chart (2018)	Position
US Billboard 200	151
US Top Country Albums (Billboard)	18
Chart (2019)	Position
US Top Country Albums (Billboard)	49

== Certifications ==
Region	Certification	Certified units/sales
Canada (Music Canada)	Gold	40,000^{‡}
United States (RIAA)	Platinum	1,000,000^{‡}
^{‡} Sales+streaming figures based on certification alone.
