= Old Dominion (album) =

Studio album by Old Dominion
- Released: October 25, 2019
- Genre: Country
- Length: 41:58
- Label: RCA Nashville
- Producer: Shane McAnally; Old Dominion

Old Dominion chronology
Happy Endings (2017)	Old Dominion (2019)	Time, Tequila & Therapy (2021)

Singles from Old Dominion
- 1. "Make It Sweet" Released: November 5, 2018; 2. "One Man Band" Released: June 17, 2019; 3. "Some People Do" Released: March 2, 2020; 4. "Never Be Sorry" Released: August 31, 2020

Old Dominion is the third studio album by American country music band Old Dominion. It was released on October 25, 2019 via RCA Records Nashville.

== Content ==
The band announced the album's release in July 2019. At the time, the album had produced two singles: "Make It Sweet" and "One Man Band", the latter of which the band debuted on Good Morning America following the release announcement. The band promoted the album throughout 2019 on the Make It Sweet Tour.

On August 7, 2020, the band released a "meow mix" of the album, featuring all of the vocals replaced with the word "meow".

Five bonus tracks were released with the album. The first of these, "I'm On It", was originally intended for Meat and Candy but was replaced on that album by "Song for Another Time". The second, "Goes Without Saying", was recorded while the band was working on their self-titled EP but was not included on that release. A live version of the third bonus track, "Can't Get You", was previously included on Happy Endings. Ramsey explained, "We tried to record 'Can’t Get You' for both Happy Endings and for Meat and Candy, but we just felt like we weren’t bringing the same energy to that song in the studio that we could do live. Something about a live audience really brought that out in us, so we abandoned this recording and went with a live version on Happy Endings. But this is the original studio recording that we never even finished, there’s no background vocals or anything on here."

The fourth bonus track is "Everything to Lose". Ramsey called it "just one of those fun songs" that "had that great kind of dance-y feel" and 'go go' bells running all through it". He said the band had "wrestled" with the song and ultimately decided to leave it off the standard release of the album but were glad they had a chance to release it as a bonus track.

The final bonus track, "Dancing Forever", was previously recorded by Michael Ray for his 2018 album Amos. It was written by Old Dominion members Matt Ramsey and Trevor Rosen along with Shane McAnally and Ross Copperman for their daughters, the morning of the memorial service for Andrew Dorff, who co-wrote several songs with Old Dominion. "Dancing Forever" was recorded while the band was working on Happy Endings but not included on that album.

== Critical reception ==
Giving it 4 out of 5 stars, Stephen Thomas Erlewine of AllMusic wrote that "Old Dominion aren't ashamed that they provide music for romance and relaxation, and the fact that they don't seem to be trying quite so hard this third time around makes their eponymous album feel natural and, yes, more like themselves."

== Commercial performance ==
Old Dominion debuted at number nine on the US Billboard 200 with 31,000 album-equivalent units, including 19,000 pure album sales. It is Old Dominion's second US top-10 album. It has a further 5,000 in pure album sales the second week. It has sold 59,400 copies in the United States, with 379,000 units consumed in total as of March 2020.

== Track listing ==
No.	Title	Writer(s)	Length
1.	"Make It Sweet"	Matthew Ramsey; Trevor Rosen; Whit Sellers; Geoff Sprung; Brad Tursi; Shane McAnally	3:06
2.	"Smooth Sailing"	Ramsey; Rosen; Tursi; Jesse Frasure	3:35
3.	"One Man Band"	Ramsey; Rosen; Tursi; Josh Osborne	3:06
4.	"Never Be Sorry"	Ramsey; Rosen; Tursi; McAnally; Osborne	3:24
5.	"My Heart Is a Bar"	Ramsey; Rosen; Tursi; McAnally; Osborne	3:58
6.	"Midnight Mess Around"	Ramsey; Rosen; Tursi; Andrew Dorff	3:56
7.	"Do It With Me"	Ramsey; Rosen; McAnally	3:36
8.	"Hear You Now"	Ramsey; Rosen; Sellers; Sprung; Tursi; McAnally	4:22
9.	"I'll Roll"	Rosen; Tursi; James T. Slater	3:25
10.	"American Style"	Ramsey; Rosen; Tursi; Frasure	2:48
11.	"Paint the Grass Green"	Ramsey; Rosen; Tursi; Osborne; Ross Copperman	3:28
12.	"Some People Do"	Ramsey; Frasure; McAnally; Thomas Rhett	3:14
Total length:			41:58

Digital/Streaming Bonus Tracks
No.	Title	Writer(s)	Length
13.	"I'm On It"	Ramsey; Rosen; Matt Jenkins	3:07
14.	"Goes Without Saying"	Ramsey; Osborne; Dorff	4:07
15.	"Can't Get You"	Ramsey; Osborne; Dorff	2:44
16.	"Everything to Lose"	Ramsey; Osborne; Matt Dragstrem	3:10
17.	"Dancing Forever"	Ramsey; Rosen; McAnally; Copperman	3:31
Total length:			58:42

== Personnel ==
=== Old Dominion ===
- Matthew Ramsey – electric guitar, lead vocals, background vocals
- Trevor Rosen – acoustic guitar, piano, background vocals
- Whit Sellers – drums, percussion, background vocals
- Geoff Sprung – bass guitar, background vocals
- Brad Tursi – acoustic guitar, electric guitar, background vocals

=== Additional musicians ===
- Dave Cohen – Hammond B-3 organ, piano, synthesizer, Wurlitzer
- David Huff – programming
- Justin Niebank – programming

== Charts ==
=== Weekly charts ===
Chart (2019)	Peak position
Australian Albums (ARIA)	79
Canadian Albums (Billboard)	21
Scottish Albums (OCC)	32
US Billboard 200	9
US Top Country Albums (Billboard)	1

=== Year-end charts ===
Chart (2019)	Position
US Top Country Albums (Billboard)	76

Chart (2020)	Position
US Billboard 200	125
US Top Country Albums (Billboard)	11

Chart (2021)	Position
US Top Country Albums (Billboard)	68

== Certifications ==
Region	Certification	Certified units/sales
Canada (Music Canada)	Platinum	80,000^{‡}
United States (RIAA)	Platinum	1,000,000^{‡}
^{‡} Sales+streaming figures based on certification alone.
