= Written in the Sand (song) =

Single by Old Dominion

from the album Happy Endings
- Released: September 18, 2017
- Genre: Country
- Length: 3:06
- Label: RCA Nashville
- Songwriters: Matthew Ramsey; Trevor Rosen; Brad Tursi; Shane McAnally
- Producer: Shane McAnally

Old Dominion singles chronology
"No Such Thing as a Broken Heart" (2017)	"Written in the Sand" (2017)	"Hotel Key" (2018)

"Written in the Sand" is a song recorded by American country music group Old Dominion. It was released in September 2017 as the second single from their second major-label album Happy Endings. Group members Matthew Ramsey, Trevor Rosen, and Brad Tursi wrote the song with Shane McAnally, who also produced it. The track is about a relationship being questioned about its future. "Written in the Sand" gave the group their fourth number one hit on the Billboard Country Airplay chart and reached number 3 on the Hot Country Songs chart. It also peaked outside the top 50 on the Hot 100 chart. The song was certified platinum by the Recording Industry Association of America (RIAA), and has sold 246,000 copies in the United States as of April 2018. It achieved similar chart success in Canada, garnering the group their second number one hit on the Canada Country chart and peaking at number 83 on the Canadian Hot 100. The song received a gold certification from Music Canada, denoting sales of over 40,000 copies in that country.

== Content ==
Liv Stecker of The Boot wrote that the song is "a mellow, reflective tune that questions the future of a relationship", in which the narrator asks "Are we written in the stars, baby, or are we written in the sand?" The song features "snaps and gentle, fingerpicked acoustic guitar". Lead vocalist Matthew Ramsey wrote the song with group members Trevor Rosen and Brad Tursi, along with Shane McAnally, who produced it.

Sounds Like Nashville writer Cillea Houghton cited the song as an example of the band's use of wordplay in their material.

== Commercial performance ==
On the Billboard Hot 100, the track debuted at number 99 on the week of December 9, 2017. Eleven weeks later, it peaked at number 51 the week of February 17, 2018 and stayed on the chart for twenty weeks. The song has sold 246,000 copies in the United States as of April 2018. It was certified Platinum on August 22, 2018.

In Canada, "Written in the Sand" debuted at number 97 on the Canadian Hot 100 chart dated January 13, 2018, peaked at number 83 the week of February 17, and remained on the chart for eight weeks.

== Charts and certifications ==
=== Weekly charts ===
Chart (2017–2018)	Peak position
Canada Hot 100 (Billboard)	83
Canada Country (Billboard)	1
US Billboard Hot 100	51
US Country Airplay (Billboard)	1
US Hot Country Songs (Billboard)	3

=== Certifications ===
Region	Certification	Certified units/sales
Australia (ARIA)	Gold	35,000^{‡}
Canada (Music Canada)	Platinum	80,000^{‡}
United States (RIAA)	3× Platinum	246,000
^{‡} Sales+streaming figures based on certification alone.

=== Year-end charts ===
Chart (2017)	Position
US Hot Country Songs (Billboard)	81

Chart (2018)	Position
US Country Airplay (Billboard)	38
US Hot Country Songs (Billboard)	36
