= Seminary Garden =

Garden in Prague, Czech Republic

- Seminářská zahrada
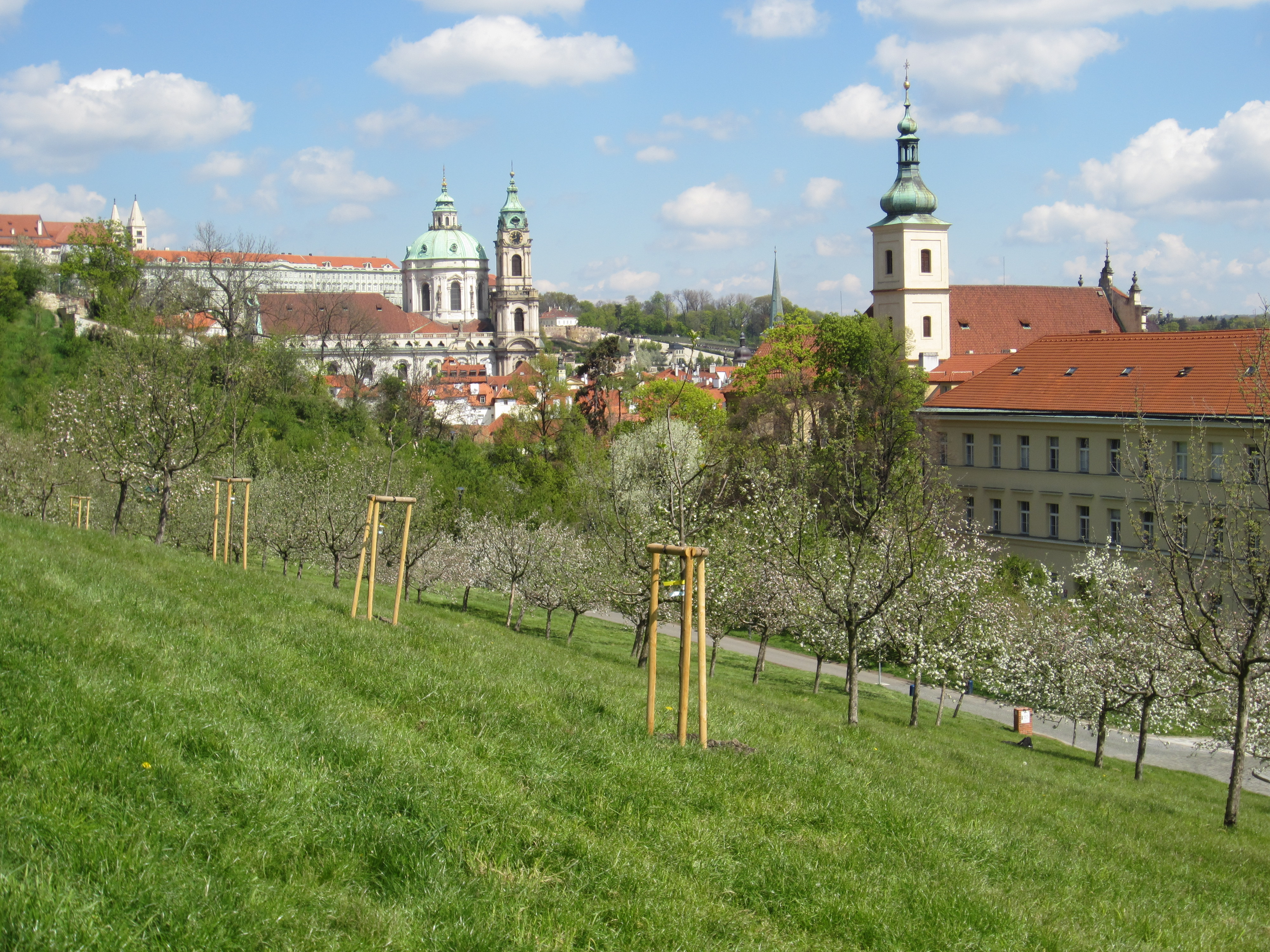
- Interactive map of Seminary Garden
- Type: Public park
- Location: Malá Strana
- Nearest city: Prague
- Coordinates: 50°5′3.8″N 14°23′59.85″E
- Area: 17 hectares (42 acres)
- Opened: 1930

Seminary Garden (Czech: Seminářská zahrada) is located in Prague, Czech Republic.
