= Hotel Key =

Single by Old Dominion

from the album Happy Endings
- Released: April 9, 2018
- Genre: Country
- Length: 2:47
- Label: RCA Nashville
- Songwriter(s): Matthew Ramsey; Trevor Rosen; Josh Osborne
- Producer(s): Shane McAnally

Old Dominion singles chronology
"Written in the Sand" (2017)	"Hotel Key" (2018)	"Make It Sweet" (2018)

"Hotel Key" is a song recorded by American country music group Old Dominion. It was released in April 2018 as the third single from their 2017 album Happy Endings.

== Content ==
"Hotel Key" is about a couple who has a one-night stand at a hotel, but does not forget their encounter after it is over. In particular, the female half of the couple keeps the hotel key as a memento after the encounter is over. Group members Matthew Ramsey and Trevor Rosen wrote the song with Josh Osborne.

The radio version changes the verse where Ramsey sings "We were smoking a little, from a half an ounce," to "We were stuck in the middle, lovin’ every ounce."

== Commercial performance ==
The song reached number one on the Country Airplay chart for charts dated September 29, 2018, becoming Old Dominion's fifth number one single, and the fourth consecutive number one, on that chart. The song has sold 105,000 copies in the United States as of October 2018.

== Music video ==
The song's music video was directed by Jim Wright, and was filmed at the Safari Inn in Murfreesboro, Tennessee. It portrays a couple's encounter at a hotel, with Ramsey portraying a desk clerk.

== Charts ==
=== Weekly charts ===
Chart (2018)	Peak position
Canada (Canadian Hot 100)	76
Canada Country (Billboard)	2
US Billboard Hot 100	48
US Country Airplay (Billboard)	1
US Hot Country Songs (Billboard)	5

=== Year-end charts ===
Chart (2018)	Position
US Country Airplay (Billboard)	4
US Hot Country Songs (Billboard)	20
US Radio Songs (Billboard)	59

== Certifications ==
Region	Certification	Certified units/sales
Canada (Music Canada)	Gold	40,000^{‡}
United States (RIAA)	Platinum	1,000,000^{‡}
^{‡} Sales+streaming figures based on certification alone.
