= William Michael Morgan =

American singer-songwriter

- Born: May 13, 1993 (age 32)
- Origin: Vicksburg, Mississippi, United States
- Genres: Country
- Occupations: Singer; songwriter
- Instruments: Vocals; guitar
- Years active: 2009–present
- Website: williammichaelmorgan.com

William Michael Morgan (born May 13, 1993) is an American country music singer from Vicksburg, Mississippi. He was signed to Warner Bros. Nashville.

His debut single "I Met a Girl", reached number two on the Country Airplay chart and number eight on the Hot Country Songs chart in October 2016; the song was co-written with Sam Hunt. The album's second single "Missing", was released to country radio on November 7, 2016. His debut studio album Vinyl, was released on September 30, 2016. Morgan parted ways with Warner Bros. Nashville in January 2019.

== Discography ==
=== Albums ===
Title	Album details	Peak chart positions		Sales
Title	Album details	US Country	US	Sales
Vinyl	Release date: September 30, 2016; Label: Warner Bros. Nashville	5	65	US: 30,600

=== Extended plays ===
Title	Album details	Peak chart positions		Sales
Title	Album details	US Country	US Heat	Sales
William Michael Morgan	Release date: March 18, 2016; Label: Warner Bros. Nashville	28	5	US: 15,500

=== Singles ===
Year	Single	Peak chart positions				Sales	Album
Year	Single	US Country	US Country Airplay	US	CAN Country	Sales	Album
2015	"I Met a Girl"	8	2	60	19	US: 296,000; RIAA: Gold	Vinyl
2016	"Missing"	49	29	—	—		Vinyl
2017	"Vinyl"	—	—	—	—		Vinyl

=== Music videos ===
Year	Video	Director
2015	"I Met a Girl"	Matt Underwood
2016	"Missing"	Jack Guy
2017	"Vinyl"	
2018	Tonight Girl" (From The Neon Lounge)	
2018	"Brokenhearted" (From The Neon Lounge)	
2018	"Talking To a Girl" (From The Neon Lounge)	
2018	"Gone Enough" (From The Neon Lounge)	
2018	"Workin" (From The Neon Lounge)	
