= Seminary Magazine =

Seminary Magazine was an American magazine published from 1863 to 1873. It was edited by W. M. Hazlewood, in Richmond, Virginia. It published literary and education material; in 1870 its name was changed to Old Dominion and, according to Frank Luther Mott, "its scope was broadened", but it folded in 1873.
