= One Man Band (Old Dominion song) =

Single by Old Dominion

from the album Old Dominion
- Released: June 17, 2019
- Recorded: December 2018
- Genre: Country
- Length: 3:08
- Label: RCA Nashville
- Songwriters: Josh Osborne; Matthew Ramsey; Trevor Rosen; Brad Tursi
- Producers: Shane McAnally; Old Dominion

Old Dominion singles chronology
"Make It Sweet" (2018)	"One Man Band" (2019)	"Some People Do" (2020)

"One Man Band" is a song recorded by American country music band Old Dominion. It was released in June 2019 as the second single from their self-titled third studio album. The song peaked at No. 20 on the Billboard Hot 100, becoming their highest charting single.

== History ==
Lead singer Matthew Ramsey said that the idea for the song came to him just before a concert. He wrote the song with band members Trevor Rosen and Brad Tursi, and frequent collaborator Josh Osborne. The song uses the concept of a one-man band as a metaphor for a man who wants to have a committed relationship instead of living alone. Ramsey describes it as the band's "first love song", and notes that the lyrics have a double meaning that he feels can also refer to his relationship with his bandmates.

== Commercial performance ==
"One Man Band" reached No. 1 on Billboard's Country Airplay on chart dated December 14, 2019. It was certified seven-times Platinum by the RIAA on February 6, 2025 for eight million units in sales and streams, their highest certified single. The song has sold 278,000 copies in the United States as of March 2020.

== Charts ==
=== Weekly charts ===
Chart (2019)	Peak position
Canada Hot 100 (Billboard)	45
Canada Country (Billboard)	1
US Billboard Hot 100	20
US Country Airplay (Billboard)	1
US Hot Country Songs (Billboard)	2
US Rolling Stone Top 100	13

=== Year-end charts ===
Chart (2019)	Position
US Country Airplay (Billboard)	54
US Hot Country Songs (Billboard)	26

Chart (2020)	Position
US Billboard Hot 100	59
US Country Airplay (Billboard)	42
US Hot Country Songs (Billboard)	6

== Certifications ==
Region	Certification	Certified units/sales
Canada (Music Canada)	5× Platinum	400,000^{‡}
New Zealand (RMNZ)	Platinum	30,000^{‡}
United States (RIAA)	8× Platinum	8,000,000^{‡}
^{‡} Sales+streaming figures based on certification alone.
