= I Met a Girl (William Michael Morgan song) =

Single by William Michael Morgan

from the album Vinyl
- Released: August 24, 2015
- Genre: Country
- Length: 3:21
- Label: Warner Bros. Nashville
- Songwriters: Sam Hunt; Trevor Rosen; Shane McAnally
- Producers: Jimmy Ritchey; Scott Hendricks

William Michael Morgan singles chronology
"I Met a Girl" (2015)	"Missing" (2016)

Music video
- "I Met a Girl" on YouTube

"I Met a Girl" is a debut song recorded by American country music singer William Michael Morgan for his self-titled extended play which was released in 2016. It was released with a radio add date of August 24, 2015, by Warner Bros. Nashville. It was also included on his debut studio album Vinyl, which was released on September 30, 2016. The song was written by Sam Hunt, Trevor Rosen, and Shane McAnally, and produced by Jimmy Ritchey and Scott Hendricks. Sam Hunt recorded an acoustic version of the track for his 2013 mixtape Between the Pines.

== Critical reception ==
The song has received positive reviews from music critics: Taste of Country awarded "I Met a Girl" with the Taste of Country Critic's Pick, saying that the single is "a warm country love song that slows time" and adding that "strong songwriting and Morgan's smooth baritone make the song tough to resist".

The song has sold 282,000 copies in the US as of November 2016.

== Chart performance ==
=== Weekly charts ===
Chart (2015–2016)	Peak position
Canada Country (Billboard)	19
US Billboard Hot 100	60
US Country Airplay (Billboard)	2
US Hot Country Songs (Billboard)	8

=== Year end charts ===
Chart (2016)	Position
US Country Airplay (Billboard)	20
US Hot Country Songs (Billboard)	45
