= Make It Sweet =

Single by Old Dominion

from the album Old Dominion
- Released: November 5, 2018
- Genre: Country
- Length: 3:10
- Label: RCA Nashville
- Songwriter(s): Matthew Ramsey; Trevor Rosen; Whit Sellers; Geoff Sprung; Brad Tursi; Shane McAnally
- Producer(s): Shane McAnally; Old Dominion

Old Dominion singles chronology
"Hotel Key" (2018)	"Make It Sweet" (2018)	"One Man Band" (2019)

"Make It Sweet" is a song recorded by American country music band Old Dominion. It was released in November 2018 as the lead single from the band's self-titled third studio album for RCA Records Nashville. All five members of the band wrote the song with Shane McAnally, who also produced it.

== History ==
Taste of Country described the song as having "hand-clapped rhythms, memorable guitar riffs and an optimistic outlook as Old Dominion sing the money line, 'Life is short, make it sweet.'" After releasing the song, the band posted on Instagram that "The plan was to write a song and record it on that same day. What happened was something we could never have planned. The words fell out and the next thing we knew, we had recorded 'Make It Sweet.' It's raw and natural and 100% us."

In October 2018, the band released a video for the song, and announced a headlining tour of the same name set to start January 2019. The band performed the song at the ACM Awards in April 2019.

== Music video ==
The music video was directed by Shaun Silva in September 2018.

== Commercial performance ==
The song has sold 101,000 copies in the United States as of April 2019.

== Charts ==
=== Weekly charts ===
Chart (2018–2019)	Peak position
Canada (Canadian Hot 100)	70
Canada Country (Billboard)	1
US Billboard Hot 100	56
US Country Airplay (Billboard)	1
US Hot Country Songs (Billboard)	8

=== Year-end charts ===
Chart (2019)	Position
US Country Airplay (Billboard)	18
US Hot Country Songs (Billboard)	36

== Certifications ==
Region	Certification	Certified units/sales
Canada (Music Canada)	Platinum	80,000^{‡}
United States (RIAA)	Platinum	1,000,000^{‡}
^{‡} Sales+streaming figures based on certification alone.
