= Meat and Candy =

Studio album by Old Dominion
- Released: November 6, 2015
- Genre: Country
- Length: 35:51
- Label: RCA Nashville
- Producer: Shane McAnally

Old Dominion chronology
Old Dominion (2014)	Meat and Candy (2015)	Happy Endings (2017)

Singles from Meat and Candy
- 1. "Break Up with Him" Released: January 20, 2015; 2. "Snapback" Released: January 11, 2016; 3. "Song for Another Time" Released: June 20, 2016

Meat and Candy is the debut studio album by American country music band Old Dominion. It was released on November 6, 2015 by RCA Nashville. The album includes the single "Break Up with Him", which has charted No. 1 on Country Airplay. The album's second single, "Snapback" released to country radio on January 11, 2016. The album's third single, "Song for Another Time" released to country radio on June 20, 2016.

== Background ==
Prior to Meat and Candy, Old Dominion released a self-titled six track EP on October 7, 2014. Four of the EP's tracks, "Break Up With Him", "Nowhere Fast", "Beer Can in a Truck Bed", and Wrong Turns", were reissued as part of Meat and Candy.

== Conception ==
Songwriter and producer Shane McAnally came up with the album's name, using the words "meat and candy" to suggest the "heftier songs" and "lighter fare" respectively. For the album cover, the band found photographer Michael Elins, to create an image of a female soda jerk before a table covered with meat products and candy. Lead singer Matthew Ramsey told Rolling Stone that the album cover "shows our personality without showing us, and it definitely shows that we're trying to do something different".

== Critical reception ==
Giving it an "A−", Tammy Ragusa of Nash Country Weekly wrote that "The combination of catchy rhymes, clever lyrics, Matt Ramsey's warm, strong voice, and the band's subtle but delicious harmonie will have you singing, clapping, and dancing along." Stephen Thomas Erlewine of AllMusic rated the album 4 out of 5 stars, saying that "this is a sharper, savvier variation of Rascal Flatts: crossover pop as suited for an office as it is for a make-out session. That's an endorsement, not a dismissal: it's hard to sound this light and easy, but Old Dominion do it with aplomb and they're such talented craftsmen that Meat and Candy sounds better on the fifth play than it does on the first, and it sounds mighty fine that first time through."

== Commercial performance ==
The album debuted at No. 16 on the Billboard 200 and No. 5 on the Top Country Albums, selling 20,500 copies in its first week. Within the first month of its release, on November 28, 2016, it was certified Gold by the RIAA. It peaked at No. 3 on the Country Albums chart on its 17th week of release in March 2016 due to sale at both iTunes and Google Play stores, with 10,200 sold for the week. The album has sold 192,900 copies in the US as of May 2017.

== Track listing ==
No.	Title	Writer(s)	Length
1.	"Snapback"	Brad Tursi; Matthew Ramsey; Trevor Rosen	3:26
2.	"Half Empty"	Matt Jenkins; Ramsey; Rosen	2:51
3.	"Wrong Turns"	Jenkins; Ramsey; Rosen	3:26
4.	"Said Nobody"	Tursi; Ramsey; Rosen	3:06
5.	"Crazy Beautiful Sexy"	Josh Osborne; Ross Copperman; Ramsey	3:10
6.	"Nowhere Fast"	Jenkins; Ramsey; Rosen	3:10
7.	"Beer Can in a Truck Bed"	Jenkins; Ramsey; Rosen	3:22
8.	"Break Up with Him"	Tursi; Geoff Sprung; Ramsey; Rosen; Whit Sellers	3:27
9.	"Song for Another Time"	Tursi; Jenkins; Ramsey; Rosen	3:12
10.	"Til It's Over"	Jimmy Robbins; Ramsey; Shane McAnally	3:28
11.	"We Got It Right"	Ramsey; Copperman; McAnally	3:13

== Personnel ==
=== Old Dominion ===
- Matthew Ramsey – clapping, electric guitar, keyboards, lead vocals, background vocals, gang vocals
- Trevor Rosen – clapping, acoustic guitar, hi-string guitar, keyboards, background vocals, gang vocals
- Whit Sellers – drums, percussion, programming
- Geoff Sprung – bass guitar, clapping, gang vocals
- Brad Tursi – clapping, electric guitar, hi-string guitar, percussion, programming, background vocals, gang vocals

=== Additional musicians ===
- Dave Cohen – Hammond B-3 organ, piano, synthesizer, Wurlitzer electric piano
- Mike Durham – electric guitar
- Tommy Garris – gang vocals
- Ryan Gore – percussion, programming
- Devin Malone – electric guitar
- Shane McAnally – gang vocals
- Ben Phillips – programming
- Matt Stanfield – keyboards
- Ilya Toshinsky – banjo, acoustic guitar, electric guitar, resonator guitar, hi-string guitar, mandolin

== Charts and certifications ==
=== Weekly charts ===
Chart (2015–16)	Peak position
Canadian Albums (Billboard)	30
US Billboard 200	16
US Top Country Albums (Billboard)	3

=== Year-end charts ===
Chart (2016)	Position
US Billboard 200	87
US Top Country Albums (Billboard)	17
Chart (2017)	Position
US Top Country Albums (Billboard)	38

=== Certifications ===
Region	Certification	Certified units/sales
United States (RIAA)	Platinum	1,000,000^{‡}
^{‡} Sales+streaming figures based on certification alone.
