= Shut Me Up (Old Dominion song) =

Single by Old Dominion

from the EP Old Dominion
- Released: November 3, 2014
- Recorded: 2014
- Genre: Country rock
- Length: 2:51
- Label: ReeSmack
- Songwriters: Andrew Dorff; Brad Tursi; Matthew Ramsey
- Producer: Shane McAnally

Old Dominion singles chronology
"Shut Me Up" (2014)	"Break Up with Him" (2015)

"Shut Me Up" is a song by American country music group Old Dominion. It was released in November 2014 as their debut single from their self-titled EP. Band members Matthew Ramsey and Brad Tursi wrote the song with Andrew Dorff.

== Critical reception ==
Carrie Horton of Taste of Country reviewed the single favorably, writing that "The hard-rock vibe of ‘Shut Me Up’ instantly grabs listeners in the first heavy drum beats and guitar chords and is on full display during the electric guitar-heavy bridge. Fans won’t find twang here, but that sure doesn’t mean ‘Shut Me Up’ isn’t country. In fact, it’s one of the most fun, catchy and genuinely great country songs we’ve heard this summer."

== Music video ==
The song's music video was released in October 2014 and was directed by Marcel Chagnon.

== Charts and certifications ==
The song reached number 58 on the Country Airplay chart for the week ending January 17, 2015.

Chart (2015)	Peak position
US Country Airplay (Billboard)	58
