= No Such Thing as a Broken Heart =

Single by Old Dominion

from the album Happy Endings
- Released: March 10, 2017
- Genre: Country
- Length: 2:58
- Label: RCA Nashville
- Songwriters: Matthew Ramsey; Trevor Rosen; Brad Tursi; Jesse Frasure
- Producer: Shane McAnally

Old Dominion singles chronology
"Song for Another Time" (2016)	"No Such Thing as a Broken Heart" (2017)	"Written in the Sand" (2017)

"No Such Thing as a Broken Heart" is a song recorded by American country music band Old Dominion. It was released for sale on March 10, 2017, and to radio on March 20, 2017, as the first single from their 2017 album Happy Endings. The song became the group's third number one hit on the US Billboard Country Airplay chart. It also peaked at numbers 4 and 46 on the US Billboard Hot Country Songs and Hot 100 charts respectively. It garnered similar chart success in Canada, reaching number 2 on the Canada Country chart and number 79 on the Canadian Hot 100 chart. The song was certified platinum by the Recording Industry Association of America (RIAA), and has sold 247,000 copies in the United States as of September 2017. The song also received a Platinum certification from Music Canada, denoting sales of over 80,000 units in that country.

== Background ==
Group members Matthew Ramsey, Trevor Rosen, and Brad Tursi wrote the song with RCA's Jesse Frasure, and Shane McAnally produced it. The song is described by Nash Country Daily as being "about facing the world head-on and not letting life get you down." Its lyrics contains a reference to John Mellencamp's 1982 single "Jack & Diane" – the song opens with line "I wonder if Jack and Diane ever made it".

== Music video ==
The music video was directed by Steve Condon and premiered on CMT, GAC, and Vevo in May 2017. In the video, the band are portrayed as video game heroes as they rise up the country music ladder. Along the way, they score points for good deeds, flee from rabid fans, and drop a nod to Nintendo game Duck Hunt. In each game Ramsey sings into a microphone.

== Commercial performance ==
"No Such Thing as a Broken Heart" was first released for sale on March 10, 2017, and sold 15,000 copies in its first week of release. It debuted at number 31 on Country Airplay for chart dated March 25, 2017, and entered the Hot Country Songs chart at number 26 the following week. On the week of June 17, 2017, the song debuted at number 90 on the Hot 100, peaked at number 46 the week of September 16, and stayed on the chart for nineteen weeks. It has sold 247,000 copies in the US as of September 2017. It was certified Platinum on August 22, 2018.

In Canada, the song debuted at number 89 on the Canadian Hot 100 chart dated June 24, 2017, peaked at number 79 the week of August 19, and remained on the chart for fourteen weeks. It garnered Platinum certification from Music Canada on January 31, 2018.

== Live performances ==
On May 9, 2017, the band performed the song at the Grand Ole Opry.

The group also performed the song at the 2017 Academy of Country Music Awards.

== Charts and certifications ==
=== Weekly charts ===
Chart (2017)	Peak position
Canada Hot 100 (Billboard)	79
Canada Country (Billboard)	2
US Billboard Hot 100	46
US Country Airplay (Billboard)	1
US Hot Country Songs (Billboard)	4

=== Year-end charts ===
Chart (2017)	Position
Canada Country (Billboard)	2
US Country Airplay (Billboard)	8
US Hot Country Songs (Billboard)	17
US Radio Songs (Billboard)	66

=== Certifications ===
Region	Certification	Certified units/sales
Canada (Music Canada)	Platinum	80,000^{‡}
United States (RIAA)	2× Platinum	2,000,000^{‡} / 247,000
^{‡} Sales+streaming figures based on certification alone.
