= Song for Another Time =

Single by Old Dominion

from the album Meat and Candy
- Released: June 20, 2016
- Genre: Country
- Length: 3:12
- Label: RCA Nashville
- Songwriter(s): Brad Tursi; Matt Jenkins; Matthew Ramsey; Trevor Rosen
- Producer(s): Shane McAnally

Old Dominion singles chronology
"Snapback" (2016)	"Song for Another Time" (2016)	"No Such Thing as a Broken Heart" (2017)

"Song for Another Time" is a song recorded by American country music group Old Dominion. It was released in June 2016 as the third single from their debut album Meat and Candy.

== Background ==
According to Matthew Ramsey, he first came up with the song title as his take on the saying, "That's a story for another time." However, the band could not find an idea that would fit the song title. A month later, while on tour with Kenny Chesney, he discussed the song again with bandmates Brad Tursi and Trevor Rosen, as well as songwriter Matt Jenkins who had joined them on the tour. They came up with the idea of telling the story of the breakup of a relationship, but doing it through other song titles. They wrote the song that night on the tour bus.

After the song was written, the band performed it at a sound check during the tour. They loved how it sounded so much that they decided to record the song for their album, even though they had already recorded all the songs necessary for the album: they called their producer, Shane McAnally, to reassemble the recording crew for one last song, and they quickly returned from the tour to record it. (They also recorded many of the background vocals in dressing rooms and hotel rooms so they could finish the recording.)

== Commercial performance ==
The song debuted on Country Airplay at No. 53 for chart dated June 25, 2016, and entered the Hot Country Songs chart the following week at No. 44. The song peaked at No. 4 on Hot Country Songs chart, and reached No. 1 on the Country Airplay chart in December 2016, the second No. 1 for the band on the chart. The song has sold 309,000 copies in the US as of March 2017. It was certified Platinum on August 22, 2018.

== Music video ==
The music video was directed by Steve Condon and premiered in August 2016.

== Charts ==
=== Weekly charts ===
Chart (2016–2017)	Peak position
Canada (Canadian Hot 100)	91
Canada Country (Billboard)	3
US Billboard Hot 100	59
US Country Airplay (Billboard)	1
US Hot Country Songs (Billboard)	4

=== Year end charts ===
Chart (2016)	Position
US Country Airplay (Billboard)	56
US Hot Country Songs (Billboard)	51

Chart (2017)	Position
US Country Airplay (Billboard)	57
US Hot Country Songs (Billboard)	73

== Certifications ==
Region	Certification	Certified units/sales
Canada (Music Canada)	Gold	40,000^{‡}
United States (RIAA)	Platinum	1,000,000^{‡} / 309,000
^{‡} Sales+streaming figures based on certification alone.
