= Break Up with Him =

2015 single by Old Dominion

Single by Old Dominion

from the album Meat and Candy
- Released: January 20, 2015; May 11, 2015 (re-release)
- Recorded: 2014–15
- Genre: Country
- Length: 3:28
- Label: ReeSmack; RCA Nashville
- Songwriters: Matthew Ramsey; Trevor Rosen; Whit Sellers; Geoff Sprung; Brad Tursi
- Producer: Shane McAnally

Old Dominion singles chronology
"Shut Me Up" (2014)	"Break Up with Him" (2015)	"Snapback" (2016)

"Break Up with Him" is a song written and recorded by American country music group Old Dominion. Originally released as the second single off their self-titled EP on ReeSmack in January 2015, the band later signed with RCA Nashville in February 2015 and re-released the song on May 11 as the lead single from their debut album Meat and Candy. The song garnered positive reviews from critics praising the production and lyrical content.

"Break Up with Him" peaked at number one on the Billboard Country Airplay chart, giving the band their first number-one country hit. It also charted at numbers 3 and 44 on the Hot Country Songs and Hot 100 charts respectively. The song was certified Platinum by the Recording Industry Association of America (RIAA), and has sold 719,000 copies in the United States as of May 2016. It achieved similar chart success in Canada, peaking at number 3 on the Country chart and number 53 on the Canadian Hot 100. It was certified Platinum by Music Canada, denoting sales of over 80,000 units in that country.

The accompanying music video for the song, directed by Steve Condon, pays homage to the 1985 sci-fi film Back to the Future.

== Release history ==
Before the song was released as the second single from the band's debut EP, it gained popularity after receiving airplay on the satellite Sirius XM Radio's "The Highway" channel in late 2014. The band released the song on the independent label ReeSmack to radio on January 20, 2015. The band became signed to RCA Nashville in late February 2015, and the song was re-released on May 11, 2015, as an RCA single release. All five members of the band wrote the song, and Shane McAnally produced it.

== Critical reception ==
Giving it 4.5 out of 5 stars, Markos Papadatos of Digital Journal wrote that the song "is mellow and distinct" and that, "[t]heir sound is crisp and unique, which stands out by a mile on the country radio airwaves." Jason Scott of AXS found the song's "hip-hop phrasing and definitive rock overtones" has comparable charm to Luke Bryan and Florida Georgia Line. He also thought that the song, "on its own merits of structure and quality, stands alone in the face of country music's other superstar groups", the band "have a different kind of spark that blazes through on this track." On its story told on the song of a man trying to seduce a girl over the phone, Billy Dukes of Taste of Country called it "wonderful selfishness" and praised its "refreshing boldness". In a more critical review, Kevin John Coyne of Country Universe gave the song a "D" grade, saying that there are "Two ways to hear [this song]: One, if the guy is right, then it’s a mediocre love song about that moment when two people decide to get into a relationship. The other, if the guy is wrong, it’s a creepy stalker monologue headed toward an order of protection."

== Commercial performance ==
The song became available for download with the release of the Old Dominion EP on October 7, 2014. It initially gained airplay on the Sirius XM radio stations and reached No. 1 on its chart, "The Highway" Hot 45 Countdown, at the end of 2014, 11 weeks after the song became available. It entered the Hot Country Songs chart at No. 58 for chart dated January 16, 2015, and entered the Hot Country Song chart at No. 50 two weeks later. The early sales were mainly due to SiriusXM airplay. The song began to gain traction on other radio stations, and rose steadily on the chart. It debuted on the Billboard Hot 100 at No. 99 for chart dated July 25, 2015. It reached No. 1 on Country Airplay for chart dated November 14, 2015, and peaked at Hot 100 at No. 44 the same week.

The EP was certified Gold by the RIAA on September 23, 2015, and ended up being certified double-platinum in 2020. The song has sold 719,000 copies in the US as of May 2016.

== Music video ==
The song's music video was released on July 9, 2015. Directed by Steve Condon, the video pays homage to the 1985 movie Back to the Future, with lead singer Matthew Ramsey as Marty McFly.

== Charts and certifications ==
=== Weekly charts ===
Chart (2015)	Peak position
Canada (Canadian Hot 100)	53
Canada Country (Billboard)	3
US Billboard Hot 100	44
US Country Airplay (Billboard)	1
US Hot Country Songs (Billboard)	3

=== Year-end charts ===
Chart (2015)	Position
US Country Airplay (Billboard)	7
US Hot Country Songs (Billboard)	11

=== Certifications ===
Region	Certification	Certified units/sales
Canada (Music Canada)	Platinum	80,000^{‡}
United States (RIAA)	2× Platinum	719,000
^{‡} Sales+streaming figures based on certification alone.
