= Snapback (song) =

Single by Old Dominion

from the album Meat and Candy
- Released: January 11, 2016
- Genre: Country
- Length: 3:26
- Label: RCA Nashville
- Songwriters: Brad Tursi; Matthew Ramsey; Trevor Rosen
- Producer: Shane McAnally

Old Dominion singles chronology
| "Break Up with Him" (2015) | "Snapback" (2016) | "Song for Another Time" (2016) |

"Snapback" is a song recorded by American country music group Old Dominion. It was released on January 11, 2016 as the second single from their debut studio album, Meat and Candy (2015). "Snapback" peaked at numbers 2 and 4 on the Billboard Country Airplay and Hot Country Songs charts, and was the number two Country Airplay record of 2016. It also reached the top 50 on the Hot 100 chart. The song was certified Platinum by the Recording Industry Association of America (RIAA), and has sold 413,570 copies in the United States as of July 2016. The accompanying music video for the song was directed by Steve Condon and features the band in Los Angeles performing at a skate park and a house party. The song was written by band members Matthew Ramsey, Trevor Rosen and Brad Tursi.

== Reception ==
=== Critical ===
Billy Dukes of Taste of Country reviewed the single favorably, writing that "He could be talking to some beauty he’s met previously, but it’s more fun to imagine him swaggering up to a cutie at the bar. Beyond Ramsey’s cheeky open, the song is marked by tight phrasing, sneaky high harmonies and sharp lyrics. Every rhyme snaps into place with satisfaction. Credit the songwriters, but also give a nod to producer Shane McAnally for creating a fresh sound that fits this group’s personality."

=== Commercial ===
The song reached number 4 on Hot Country Songs for chart dated May 7, 2016, and peaked at number 2 on Country Airplay on June 4, 2016. The song has sold 413,570 copies in the US as of July 2016. It was certified Platinum by the RIAA on November 29, 2017.

The song had similar chart success in Canada, giving the band their second number-one hit on the Canada Country chart and reaching number 68 on the Canadian Hot 100. It also garnered a Platinum certification from Music Canada, denoting sales of 80,000 units in that country.

== Music video ==
The music video was directed by Steve Condon and premiered in February 2016. The video features the band in Los Angeles performing at a skate park while surrounded by skateboarders performing tricks, and later moves to a house party where lead singer Matthew Ramsey sings the song with a girl sporting a backwards cap. The girl is played by pro skateboarder Letícia Bufoni.

== Charts and certifications ==
=== Weekly charts ===
| Chart (2016) | Peak position |
|---|---|
| Canada Hot 100 (Billboard) | 68 |
| Canada Country (Billboard) | 1 |
| US Billboard Hot 100 | 50 |
| US Country Airplay (Billboard) | 2 |
| US Hot Country Songs (Billboard) | 4 |

=== Year-end charts ===
| Chart (2016) | Position |
|---|---|
| US Country Airplay (Billboard) | 2 |
| US Hot Country Songs (Billboard) | 18 |

=== Certifications ===
| Region | Certification | Certified units/sales |
|---|---|---|
| Canada (Music Canada) | Platinum | 80,000^{‡} |
| United States (RIAA) | 3× Platinum | 413,570 |
^{‡} Sales+streaming figures based on certification alone.
