= Old Dominion (band) =

American country music band

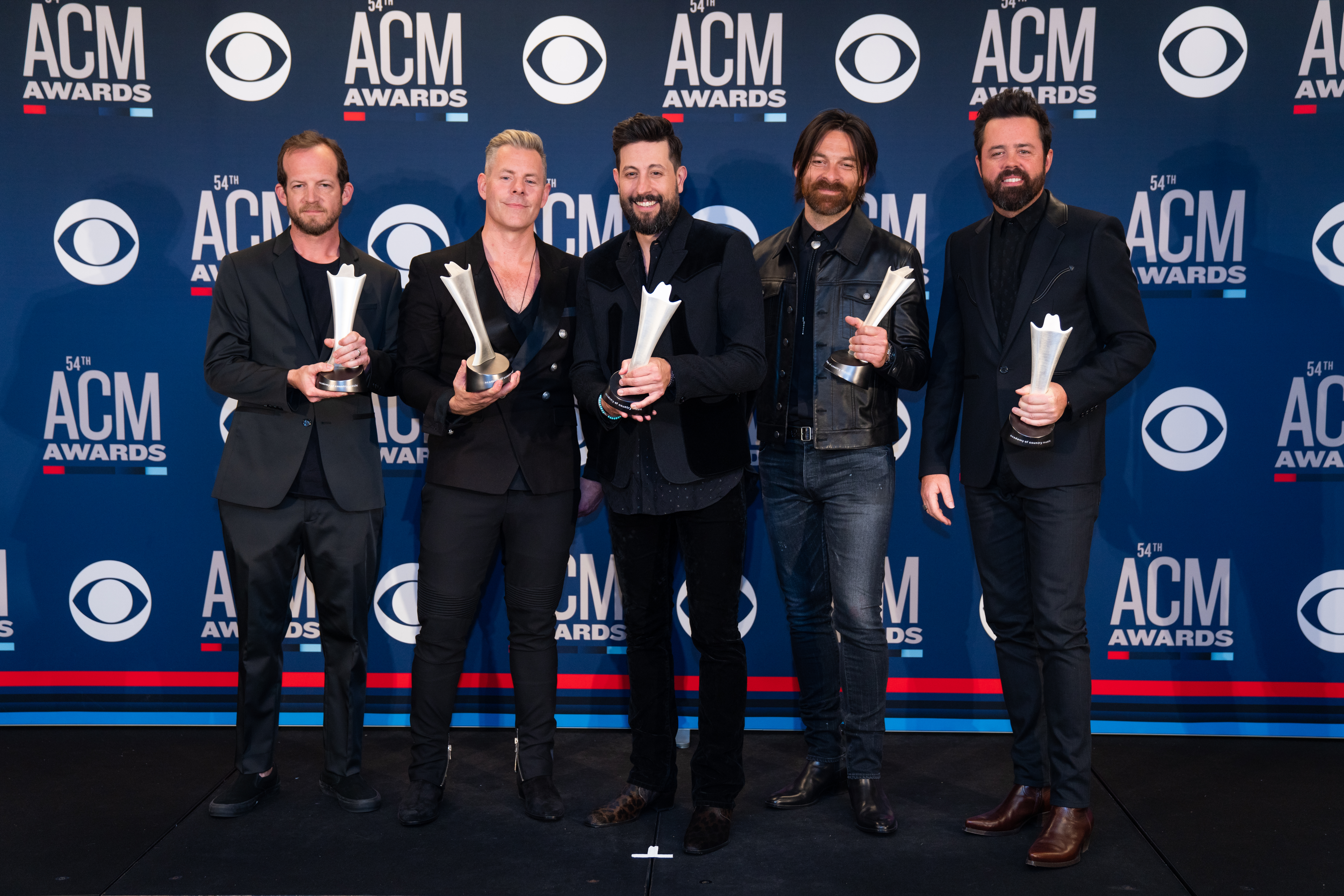
- Old Dominion at the 54th Academy of Country Music Awards; from left to right: Whit Sellers, Trevor Rosen, Matthew Ramsey, Geoff Sprung, and Brad Tursi

Background information
- Origin: Nashville, Tennessee, U.S.
- Genres: Country; country pop
- Years active: 2007–present
- Labels: ReeSmack; RCA Nashville; Arista Nashville; Columbia Nashville
- Members: Matthew Ramsey; Trevor Rosen; Whit Sellers; Geoff Sprung; Brad Tursi
- Website: weareolddominion.com

Old Dominion is an American country music band formed in Nashville, Tennessee. The band consists of Matthew Ramsey (lead vocals, rhythm guitar), Trevor Rosen (rhythm guitar, keyboards), Whit Sellers (drums), Geoff Sprung (bass guitar), and Brad Tursi (lead guitar). Their music is contemporary country with rock instrumentation, and has pop overtones.

The band has released five full-length albums and three EPs. They released their self-titled EP in 2014, followed in the next year by their debut studio album, Meat and Candy on RCA Records Nashville, which includes the singles "Break Up with Him", "Snapback", and "Song for Another Time". Their second album, Happy Endings, was released in 2017, which includes the singles "No Such Thing as a Broken Heart", "Written in the Sand", and "Hotel Key". The third album, Old Dominion, was released in 2019, with the singles "Make It Sweet" and "One Man Band" both successful on the chart. The album also included "Some People Do", which earned the group a Grammy Award nomination for Best Country Duo/Group Performance.

The band's fourth album, Time, Tequila & Therapy, was released in 2021. In October 2023, the band released Memory Lane, their fifth full-length album. In addition to their own material, Ramsey, Rosen, and Tursi have written several hit singles for other contemporary country music artists.

== Origin ==
The band members of Old Dominion are lead singer Matthew Ramsey, Trevor Rosen on guitar and keyboard, Whit Sellers on drums, Geoff Sprung on bass, and Brad Tursi on guitar. The band was named Old Dominion in 2007. "Old Dominion" was chosen because it is a nickname for the U.S. state of Virginia; four members of the group have links to Virginia.

Ramsey and Sellers are both originally from the Roanoke Region of Virginia, and played on drumlines for their respective, rival high school bands at James River High School in Buchanan and Lord Botetourt High School in Daleville. Ramsey attended Virginia Commonwealth University in Richmond and moved to Nashville after graduation to become a songwriter. He was introduced to Rosen in 2003 and formed a songwriting partnership for some years while working as a solo artist. Sellers went to James Madison University in Harrisonburg, Virginia where he met Sprung and Tursi. Sellers and Sprung also ended up in Nashville where they joined Ramsey and formed Old Dominion. Tursi was once a member of the Washington, D.C. rock band Army of Me; he joined Old Dominion in 2012. Rosen is the only band member who did not have a connection to Virginia; he was born in Woodhaven, Michigan and grew up there. Rosen met the other eventual bandmates in Nashville.

== Music career ==
Old Dominion was initially formed to showcase the songs that its individual band members had written. Members of the band have writing credits on many songs recorded by other artists: Brad Tursi has written Luke Bryan's "Light It Up", Cole Swindell's "Remember Boys" and "Up" as well as Tyler Farr's "A Guy Walks Into a Bar" in addition to songs for Kenny Chesney, the Randy Rogers Band, Michael Ray, Josh Turner, Ryan Hurd, and for the ABC musical drama Nashville. Matthew Ramsey co-wrote "Chainsaw" for the Band Perry, Trevor Rosen co-wrote Kelsea Ballerini's "I Hate Love Songs", Blake Shelton's "Sangria", William Michael Morgan's "I Met A Girl", Chris Young's "Neon", and The Band Perry's "Better Dig Two", Two songs written for the band by Ramsey and Rosen, "Wake Up Lovin' You" and "Say You Do", were covered by Craig Morgan and Dierks Bentley respectively and became hits. The success of the two songs led to the band self-releasing the extended play It Was Always Yours in 2012.

Their song "Dirt on a Road" was their first song as a band which received significant airplay, and their single "Shut Me Up" further gained them some attention. The band opened for Alabama, Jake Owen, and Chase Rice.

=== 2014–2016: Old Dominion EP, Meat and Candy ===
On October 7, 2014, they released their self-titled EP, produced by Shane McAnally. The EP debuted on the Top Country Albums chart at No. 33 with 1,000 copies sold. The lead single from the EP was "Shut Me Up", the music video features American country music singer and songwriter Whitney Duncan. A song from the EP "Break Up with Him" first received exposure on the satellite Sirius XM Radio's "The Highway" channel in late 2014 which boosted its popularity, and the song was then released as the second single to radio on January 20, 2015.

They signed a record deal with RCA Nashville in late February 2015. The band also opened for Kenny Chesney on his Big Revival Tour. In September, they announced that their debut studio album, titled Meat and Candy, would be released on November 6, 2015. Shortly before the album's release, "Break Up with Him" reached No. 1 on Country Airplay. The album's second single, "Snapback" released to country radio on January 11, 2016. It was number 2 on the Country Airplay in June 2016. The album's third single, "Song for Another Time" was released to country radio on June 20, 2016.

=== 2017–present: Happy Endings, Old Dominion, Time, Tequila & Therapy, Memory Lane and Odies But Goodies ===
On March 10, 2017, Old Dominion released "No Such Thing as a Broken Heart", the lead single to their second RCA album, which went to number one on the Country Airplay Charts. The album's name, Happy Endings, was announced in June, and the album was released on August 25, 2017. "Written in the Sand" was the album's second single, and "Hotel Key" its third.

The band released "Make It Sweet" in November 2018. Make It Sweet is also the name of the corresponding tour, the band's first as a headliner. Acts which joined them on this tour included Morgan Evans, Jordan Davis, and Mitchell Tenpenny. Both "Make It Sweet" and "One Man Band" appear on the band's third album, Old Dominion, released in October 2019, with the latter becoming their highest-peaking Billboard Hot 100 hit to date. However, the album's third single "Some People Do" became their first single since their commercial breakthrough to fail to chart the Billboard Hot 100, as well as their first single to peak outside the top twenty of Billboard's Country Airplay chart.

The fourth album, Time, Tequila & Therapy, was released on October 8, 2021. It was led off by the single "I Was on a Boat That Day". For the second single, the band switched to Arista Nashville which is an imprint of Sony Nashville. They released a single titled "Memory Lane" in early 2023. After Arista Nashville closed in March 2023, the band transferred again to Columbia Records Nashville.

On June 23, 2023, the band released their fourth EP, titled Memory Lane. The eight–track EP includes 2 singles, "Memory Lane" and "I Should Have Married You". On October 6, 2023, they released an 18–track full album with the same Memory Lane title. The band released their sixth album, Odies But Goodies, on September 6, 2024. The thirty-one track project includes a cover of Johnny Lee's "Lookin' For Love", a song which originally appeared as part of the soundtrack to the film, Urban Cowboy, as well as the single, "Coming Home." They released their sixth album, Barbara, on August 22, 2025.

== Discography ==
- Meat and Candy (2015)
- Happy Endings (2017)
- Old Dominion (2019)
- Time, Tequila & Therapy (2021)
- Memory Lane (2023)
- Barbara (2025)

== Television appearances ==
Year	Title	Role	Notes
2014	Nashville (2012 TV series)	Themselves	Season 3 of Episode 3 (Playing Live)
2019	Songland	Themselves	Season 1 of Episode 8 (Judging)
2022	CMA Country Christmas	Themselves	

== Awards and nominations ==
Year	Awards	Recipient/Work	Category	Result	Ref.
2016	Academy of Country Music Awards	Old Dominion	New Vocal Duo or Group of the Year	Won	
2016	Academy of Country Music Awards	Old Dominion	Vocal Group of the Year	Nominated	
2016	American Country Countdown Awards	Old Dominion	Breakthrough Group / Duo of the Year	Won	
2016	American Country Countdown Awards	Old Dominion	Group / Duo of the Year	Nominated	
2016	CMT Music Awards	"Break Up with Him" (Old Dominion)	Group/Duo Video of the Year	Nominated	
2016	CMT Music Awards	"Break Up with Him" (Old Dominion)	Breakthrough Video of the Year	Nominated	
2016	American Music Awards	Old Dominion	Favorite Duo or Group – Country	Nominated	
2017	iHeartRadio Music Awards	"Snapback"	Country Song of the Year	Nominated	
2017	Academy of Country Music Awards	Old Dominion	Vocal Group of the Year	Nominated	
2017	CMT Music Awards	"Song For Another Time"	Group Video of the Year	Nominated	
2017	Country Music Association Awards	Old Dominion	New Artist of the Year	Nominated	
2017	Country Music Association Awards	Old Dominion	Vocal Group of the Year	Nominated	
2017	American Music Awards	Old Dominion	Favorite Duo or Group – Country	Nominated	
2018	Academy of Country Music Awards	Old Dominion	Vocal Group of the Year	Won	
2018	Country Music Association Awards	Old Dominion	Vocal Group of the Year	Won	
2019	Billboard Music Awards	Old Dominion	Top Country Duo/Group	Nominated	
2019	CMT Music Awards	"Hotel Key"	Group Video of the Year	Nominated	
2019	Academy of Country Music Awards	Old Dominion	Vocal Group of the Year	Won	
2019	Country Music Association Awards	Old Dominion	Vocal Group of the Year	Won	
2020	CMT Music Awards	"One Man Band"	Group Video of the Year	Won	
2020	Academy of Country Music Association Awards	Old Dominion	Vocal Group of the Year	Won	
2020	Academy of Country Music Association Awards	"One Man Band"	Single of the Year	Nominated	
2020	Academy of Country Music Association Awards	"One Man Band"	Song of the Year	Won	
2020	Academy of Country Music Association Awards	"One Man Band"	Video of the Year	Nominated	
2020	Country Music Association Awards	Old Dominion	Vocal Group of the Year	Won	
2020	Country Music Association Awards	Old Dominion	Album of the Year	Nominated	
2021	Grammy Awards	"Some People Do"	Best Country Duo/Group Performance	Nominated	
2024	Country Music Association Awards	Old Dominion	Vocal Group of the Year	Won	
