= Matt Jenkins =

American musician

- Born: Fort Worth, Texas, U.S.
- Origin: Aledo, Texas, U.S.
- Genres: Country
- Occupation: Singer-songwriter
- Instrument: Vocals
- Years active: 2005–present
- Labels: Universal South

Matt Jenkins (born in Fort Worth, Texas) is an American country music artist. Signed to Universal South Records in 2003, he released two singles in 2005, including "King of the Castle", which reached number 51 on the Hot Country Songs charts, but did not release an album. He also appeared on the Fox Networks reality show Nashville, which was canceled after two episodes. An eight-song digital EP, Quarter of a Century, was released in late 2008.

Jenkins is the brother of fellow songwriter Josh Jenkins.

Jenkins co-wrote Steve Holy's 2011 single "Until the Rain Stops", Love and Theft's 2012 single "Runnin' Out of Air", Keith Urban's 2014 single "Cop Car", Dustin Lynch's 2014 single "Where It's At", and Jordan Davis's 2021 single "Buy Dirt", which won the Country Music Association Award for Song of the Year.

== Discography ==
=== Extended plays ===
Title	Album details
Quarter of a Century	Release date: 2008; Label: self-released

=== Singles ===
Year	Single	Peak positions	Album
Year	Single	US Country	Album
2005	"King of the Castle"	51	I'm Just a Man (unreleased)
2006	"Bad as I Want To"	—	I'm Just a Man (unreleased)
"—" denotes releases that did not chart
