= Trevor Rosen =

American songwriter

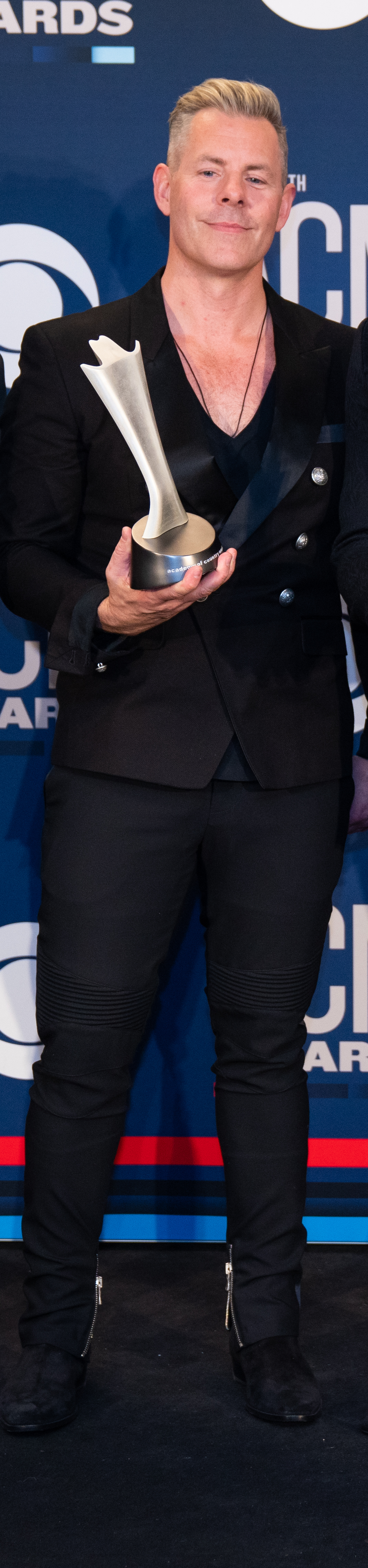
- Rosen with Old Dominion on stage receiving his award in April 2019, Old Dominion won Vocal Group of the Year at the Academy of Country Music Awards

Background information
- Birth name: Trevor Joseph Rosen
- Born: February 18, 1975 (age 50); Woodhaven, Michigan, U.S.
- Genres: Country
- Occupation: Songwriter
- Instruments: Vocals; guitar; piano
- Years active: 2003–present
- Member of: Old Dominion
- Formerly of: Unfair Superpowers

Trevor Joseph Rosen (born February 18, 1975) is an American country music songwriter and musician. He is also a member of the American country music band Old Dominion, in which he plays guitar and keyboards and sings backing vocals.

== Early life ==
Trevor Rosen grew up in Woodhaven, Michigan, a southern suburb of Detroit. He attended high school at Gabriel Richard Catholic High School. He learned piano at a young age before picking up the guitar at age 16 and forming the Detroit area rock trio Unfair Superpowers.

== Career ==
Rosen moved to Nashville in the fall of 2003 to pursue a career in songwriting. He met Matthew Ramsey soon after arriving and the two began collaborating, eventually becoming founding members of the hit supergroup, Old Dominion. Rosen signed with SMACKtown Music and Wrensong/Reynsong Publishing in 2013. He is signed to a publishing deal with Twelve6 Entertainment..

The Nashville Association of Independent Publishers named Rosen and the other members of Old Dominion the 2016 Songwriter/Artist of the Year, the same year they were honored as the Music Row Best New Artist and the Academy of Country Music's Best New Duo/Group of the Year. He co-wrote 8 of the 11 songs on their debut album Meat and Candy, including the Number One hits: Break Up With Him, Snapback and Song For Another Time. In the year following, Rosen co-wrote 9 of the 12 songs for Old Dominion's second studio album, Happy Endings, including the Number One hits, "No Such Thing as a Broken Heart" and "Written in the Sand.". In 2019, Rosen and Matt Ramsey were once again named the Songwriter/Artists of the Year. Rosen wrote 10 of the 11 songs on Old Dominion's latest self-titled album, Old Dominion, two of which went on to become Number One hit songs, Make It Sweet and One Man Band. These along with Michael Ray's number one hit song, The One That Got Away, which Rosen also co-wrote, earned him the CMA Triple Play Award for having 3 number ones within a 12-month period .

Rosen's songwriting accolades expand well beyond Old Dominion’s success, as he has written multiple number one songs including Dierks Bentley’s"Say You Do", The Band Perry's Better Dig Two, Blake Shelton’s Sangria and the longest charting number one song in Country Aircheck history, William Michael Morgan’s I Met A Girl. He has also written songs recorded by Jake Owen, Scotty McCreery, Keith Urban, Craig Morgan, Dustin Lynch, Randy Houser, and Randy Rogers Band as well as songs performed on the ABC show Nashville.

== Songs written by Rosen ==
Year	Artist	Album	Song	Co-writer(s)
2011	Chris Young	Neon	"Neon"	Josh Osborne, Shane McAnally
2012	Sam Palladio and Clare Bowen	The Music of Nashville: Season 1 Volume 2	"Fade Into You"	Matt Jenkins, Shane McAnally
2012	Randy Rogers Band	Trouble	"Fuzzy"	Josh Osborne, Shane McAnally
2012	Uncle Kracker	Midnight Special	"In Between Disasters"	Uncle Kracker, Shane McAnally, J.T. Harding
2013	Due West	Our Time	"Taste of Your Love"	Matt Lopez, Josh Osborne
2013	Craig Morgan	The Journey (Livin' Hits)	"Wake Up Lovin' You"	Matthew Ramsey, Josh Osborne
2013	The Band Perry	Pioneer	"Better Dig Two"	Brandy Clark, Shane McAnally
2013	Jake Owen	Days of Gold	"Tipsy"	Matt Jenkins, Shane McAnally
2013	Keith Urban	Fuse	"Come Back to Me"	Brandy Clark, Shane McAnally
2014	Dierks Bentley	Riser	"Say You Do"	Matthew Ramsey, Shane McAnally
2014	Blake Shelton	Bringing Back the Sunshine	"Sangria"	Thomas Harding, Josh Osborne
2015	Luke Bryan	Kill the Lights	"Scarecrows"	Shane McAnally, Ashley Gorley
2015	William Michael Morgan	Vinyl	"I Met a Girl"	Shane McAnally, Sam Hunt
2015	Old Dominion	Meat and Candy	"Break Up with Him"	Matthew Ramsey, Whit Sellers, Geoff Spring, Brad Tursi
2015	Old Dominion	Meat and Candy	"Nowhere Fast"	Matt Jenkins, Matthew Ramsey
2015	Old Dominion	Meat and Candy	"Beer Can in a Truck Bed"	Matt Jenkins, Matthew Ramsey
2015	Old Dominion	Meat and Candy	"Wrong Turns"	Matt Jenkins, Matthew Ramsey
2015	Old Dominion	Meat and Candy	"Snapback"	Matthew Ramsey, Brad Tursi
2015	Old Dominion	Meat and Candy	"Half Empty"	Matt Jenkins, Matthew Ramsey
2015	Old Dominion	Meat and Candy	"Said Nobody"	Matthew Ramsey, Brad Tursi
2015	Old Dominion	Meat and Candy	"Song for Another Time"	Matthew Ramsey, Matt Jenkins, Brad Tursi
2015	Sam Hunt	Between the Pines	"Bottle It Up"	Sam Hunt, Matt Jenkins
2016	Joe Nichols	Single	"Undone"	Josh Osborne, Ross Copperman
2016	Randy Houser	Fired Up	"Whiskeysippi River"	Matt Jenkins, Josh Jenkins
2016	Mark Leach	Homemade	"If You're Down"	Matthew Ramsey, Matt Jenkins
2016	Robby Johnson	Don't Look Back	"She Moves"	Shane McAnally, Josh Osborne
2017	Trace Adkins	Something's Going On	"Watered Down"	Matt Jenkins, Shane McAnally
2017	Old Dominion	Happy Endings	"No Such Thing as a Broken Heart"	Matthew Ramsey, Brad Tursi, Jesse Frasure
2017	Old Dominion	Happy Endings	"A Girl is a Gun"	Matthew Ramsey, Brad Tursi, Matt Jenkins
2017	Old Dominion	Happy Endings	"New York at Night"	Brad Tursi, Jordan Schmidt
2017	Old Dominion	Happy Endings	"Dancing Forever"	Matthew Ramsey, Shane McAnally, Ross Copperman
2017	Old Dominion	Happy Endings	"Hotel Key"	Matthew Ramsey, Josh Osborne
2017	Old Dominion	Happy Endings	"Not Everything's About You"	Matthew Ramsey, Brad Tursi, Andrew Dorff
2017	Old Dominion	Happy Endings	"Stars in the City"	Matthew Ramsey, Josh Osborne, Brad Tursi
2017	Old Dominion	Happy Endings	"Still Writing Songs About You"	Matthew Ramsey, Shane McAnally, Brad Tursi
2017	Old Dominion	Happy Endings	"Written in the Sand"	Shane McAnally, Matthew Ramsey, Brad Tursi
2017	Kelsea Ballerini	Unapologetically	"I Hate Love Songs"	Kelsea Ballerini, Shane McAnally
2018	Michael Ray	Amos	"One That Got Away"	Matthew Ramsey, Josh Osborne, Jesse Frasure
2019	Teddy Robb	Really Shouldn't Drink Around You	"Really Shouldn't Drink Around You"	Shane McAnally, Josh Osborne
2019	Old Dominion	Old Dominion	"Make It Sweet"	Shane McAnally, Matthew Ramsey, Brad Tursi, Whit Sellers, Geoff Sprung
2019	Old Dominion	Old Dominion	"Smooth Sailing"	Matthew Ramsey, Jesse Frasure, Brad Tursi
2019	Old Dominion	Old Dominion	"One Man Band"	Matthew Ramsey, Josh Osborne, Brad Tursi
2019	Old Dominion	Old Dominion	"Never Be Sorry"	Shane McAnally, Matthew Ramsey, Josh Osborne, Brad Tursi
2019	Old Dominion	Old Dominion	"My Heart Is Bar"	Shane McAnally, Matthew Ramsey, Josh Osborne, Brad Tursi
2019	Old Dominion	Old Dominion	"Midnight Mess Around"	Andrew Dorff, Matthew Ramsey, Brad Tursi
2019	Old Dominion	Old Dominion	"Do It With Me"	Shane McAnally, Matthew Ramsey
2019	Old Dominion	Old Dominion	"Hear You Now"	Shane McAnally, Matthew Ramsey, Brad Tursi, Whit Sellers, Geoff Sprung
2019	Old Dominion	Old Dominion	"I'll Roll"	James T. Slater, Brad Tursi
2019	Old Dominion	Old Dominion	"American Style"	Matthew Ramsey, Jesse Frasure, Brad Tursi
2019	Old Dominion	Old Dominion	"Paint The Grass Green"	Matthew Ramsey, Josh Osborne, Brad Tursi, Ross Copperman
2022	Tenille Arts	TBA	"Jealous of Myself"	Emily Weisband, John Byron
2023	Brandy Clark	Brandy Clark	"Come Back to Me"	Brandy Clark, Shane McAnally
