= Matthew Ramsey =

American singer-songwriter

Matt Ramsey

Background information
- Also known as: Matt Ramsey
- Born: Matthew Thomas Ramsey; October 21, 1977 (age 48); Buchanan, Virginia, U.S.
- Genres: Country
- Occupations: Singer, songwriter
- Instruments: Vocals; guitar
- Member of: Old Dominion

Matthew Thomas Ramsey (born October 21, 1977) is an American country music singer and songwriter who is the lead vocalist and rhythm guitarist of his band Old Dominion, with several hit songs on country radio to his credit.

== Early life ==
Ramsey grew up in Buchanan, Virginia, where he attended James River High School. He learned to play the drums at a young age before picking up the guitar at age 14. He received a degree in Illustration from Virginia Commonwealth University.

== Career ==
Ramsey moved to Nashville in 2000 to pursue a career in songwriting, where he met Trevor Rosen and the two became members of the group Old Dominion. Ramsey has written several hit songs including The Band Perry's "Chainsaw", Craig Morgan's "Wake Up Lovin' You", Dierks Bentley's "Say You Do", Kenny Chesney's "Save It for a Rainy Day", as well as songs by Sam Hunt and Luke Bryan. The band released its debut studio album, Meat and Candy, which included the number one singles "Break Up with Him" and "Song for Another Time", and top five single "Snapback", on November 6, 2015. The band has released three more albums, Happy Endings, their self-titled album, and Time, Tequila & Therapy in 2017, 2019, and 2021, respectively.

== Songs written by Ramsey ==
Year	Artist	Album	Song	Co-writer(s)
2013	The Band Perry	Pioneer	"Chainsaw"	Josh Osborne, Shane McAnally
2013	Luke Bryan	Crash My Party	"Goodbye Girl"	Josh Osborne, Shane McAnally
2013	Craig Morgan	The Journey (Livin' Hits)	"Wake Up Lovin' You"	Trevor Rosen, Josh Osborne
2014	Dierks Bentley	Riser	"Say You Do"	Shane McAnally, Trevor Rosen
2014	Old Dominion	Old Dominion EP	"Break Up with Him"	Trevor Rosen, Whit Sellers, Geoff Sprung, Brad Tursi
2014	Old Dominion	Old Dominion EP	"Nowhere Fast"	Matt Jenkins, Trevor Rosen
2014	Old Dominion	Old Dominion EP	"Beer Can in a Truck Bed"	Matt Jenkins, Trevor Rosen
2014	Old Dominion	Old Dominion EP	"Wrong Turns"	Matt Jenkins, Trevor Rosen
2014	Sam Hunt	Montevallo	"Ex to See"	Sam Hunt, Josh Osborne
2014	Sam Hunt	Montevallo	"Make You Miss Me"	Sam Hunt, Josh Osborne
2014	Kenny Chesney	The Big Revival	"Save It for a Rainy Day"	Andrew Dorff, Brad Tursi
2015	Pat Green	Home	"Day One"	Josh Osborne, Shane McAnally
2015	Old Dominion	Meat and Candy	"Break Up with Him"	Trevor Rosen, Whit Sellers, Geoff Sprung, Brad Tursi
2015	Old Dominion	Meat and Candy	"Nowhere Fast"	Matt Jenkins, Trevor Rosen
2015	Old Dominion	Meat and Candy	"Beer Can in a Truck Bed"	Matt Jenkins, Trevor Rosen
2015	Old Dominion	Meat and Candy	"Wrong Turns"	Matt Jenkins, Trevor Rosen
2015	Old Dominion	Meat and Candy	"Snapback"	Trevor Rosen, Brad Tursi
2015	Old Dominion	Meat and Candy	"Half Empty"	Matt Jenkins, Trevor Rosen
2015	Old Dominion	Meat and Candy	"Said Nobody"	Trevor Rosen, Brad Tursi
2015	Old Dominion	Meat and Candy	"Song for Another Time"	Trevor Rosen, Matt Jenkins, Brad Tursi
2015	Old Dominion	Meat and Candy	"Crazy Beautiful Sexy"	Josh Osborne, Ross Copperman
2015	Old Dominion	Meat and Candy	"'Til It's Over"	Shane McAnally, Ross Copperman
2015	Old Dominion	Meat and Candy	"We Got It Right"	Shane McAnally, Ross Copperman
2016	Mark Leach	Homemade	"If You're Down"	Trevor Rosen, Matt Jenkins
2017	Old Dominion	Happy Endings	"No Such Thing as a Broken Heart"	Trevor Rosen, Brad Tursi, Jesse Frasure
2017	Old Dominion	Happy Endings	"A Girl is a Gun"	Trevor Rosen, Brad Tursi, Matt Jenkins
2017	Old Dominion	Happy Endings	"Be With Me"	Brad Tursi, Ross Copperman
2017	Old Dominion	Happy Endings	"Can't Get You"	Josh Osborne, Andrew Dorff
2017	Old Dominion	Happy Endings	"Everything to Lose"	Josh Osborne, Matt Dragstrem
2017	Old Dominion	Happy Endings	"Hotel Key"	Trevor Rosen, Josh Osborne
2017	Old Dominion	Happy Endings	"Not Everything's About You"	Trevor Rosen, Brad Tursi, Andrew Dorff
2017	Old Dominion	Happy Endings	"Shoe Shopping"	Shane McAnally, Luke Laird
2017	Old Dominion	Happy Endings	"So You Go"	Brad Tursi, Andrew Dorff
2017	Old Dominion	Happy Endings	"Stars in the City"	Trevor Rosen, Josh Osborne, Brad Tursi
2017	Old Dominion	Happy Endings	"Still Writing Songs About You"	Trevor Rosen, Shane McAnally, Brad Tursi
2017	Old Dominion	Happy Endings	"Written in the Sand"	Shane McAnally, Trevor Rosen, Brad Tursi
2018	Old Dominion		Make it Sweet	Trevor Rosen, Whit Sellers, Geoff Sprung, Brad Tursi

== Philanthropy ==
Ramsey and his wife operate The Ramsey Foundation, which conducts philanthropic activities supporting basic needs and supporting cultural activities in Nashville. They donated $50,000 to keep a local middle school band program functioning. They also support food access in Buchanan with an annual fundraiser supporting the food bank.
