= Brett Eldredge discography =

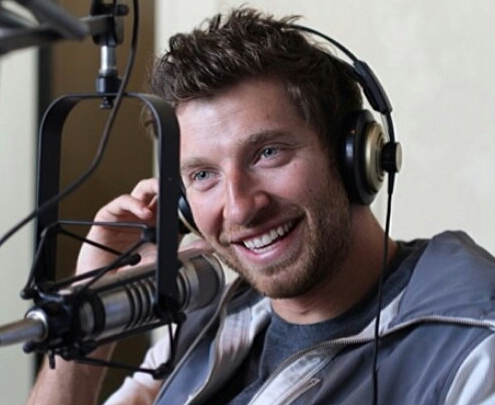
- Studio albums: 8
- EPs: 1
- Singles: 16
- Music videos: 14
- No. 1 singles (Billboard): 5
- No. 1 singles (overall): 6

The discography of American country music singer-songwriter Brett Eldredge consists of eight studio albums, one extended play, thirteen music videos, and fifteen singles, of which five have reached number one on the Billboard Country Airplay chart. He first charted a number one single with "Don't Ya".

== Studio albums ==
Title	Details	Peak chart positions				Sales	Certifications
Title	Details	US	US Country	AUS	CAN	Sales	Certifications
Bring You Back	Release date: August 6, 2013; Label: Atlantic Nashville; Formats: CD, digital download	11	2	—	—	US: 789,815	RIAA: Gold
Illinois	Release date: September 11, 2015; Label: Atlantic Nashville; Formats: CD, digital download	3	1	—	10	US: 813,146	RIAA: Gold
Glow	Release date: October 28, 2016; Label: Atlantic Nashville; Formats: CD, digital download, Vinyl	29	2	—	95	US: 283,028	
Brett Eldredge	Release date: August 4, 2017; Label: Atlantic Nashville; Formats: CD, digital download	2	1	61	10	US: 524,337	
Sunday Drive	Release date: July 10, 2020; Label: Warner Nashville; Formats: CD, digital download	42	5	—	—		
Mr. Christmas	Release date: October 22, 2021; Label: Warner Nashville; Formats: CD, digital download	—	—	—	—		
Songs About You	Release date: June 17, 2022; Label: Warner Nashville; Formats: CD, digital download	145	16	—	—		
Merry Christmas (Welcome to the Family)	Release date: September 27, 2024; Label: Warm and Cozy; Formats: CD, LP, digital download	—	—	—	—		
"—" denotes releases that did not chart

== Singles ==
=== As lead artist ===
Year	Single	Peak chart positions					Certifications	Sales	Album
Year	Single	US	US Country Songs	US Country Airplay	CAN	CAN Country	Certifications	Sales	Album
2010	"Raymond"	—	23		—	50			Bring You Back
2011	"It Ain't Gotta Be Love"	—	46		—	—			Non-album single
2012	"Don't Ya"	30	5	1	51	3	RIAA: Platinum; MC: Gold	US: 1,039,000	Bring You Back
2013	"Beat of the Music"	44	6	1	58	2	RIAA: Platinum	US: 510,000	Bring You Back
2014	"Mean to Me"	53	4	1	65	3	RIAA: Platinum	US: 477,000	Bring You Back
2015	"Lose My Mind"	48	2	1	57	2	RIAA: Platinum; MC: Gold	US: 506,000	Illinois
2015	"Drunk on Your Love"	35	2	2	64	1	RIAA: Platinum; MC: Platinum	US: 472,000	Illinois
2016	"Wanna Be That Song"	46	3	1	64	1	RIAA: Platinum; MC: Gold	US: 410,000	Illinois
2017	"Somethin' I'm Good At"	— (Note: "Somethin' I'm Good At" did not enter the Billboard Hot 100, but peaked at number seven on the Bubbling Under Hot 100 Singles chart.)	22	21	—	25	RIAA: Gold; MC: Gold	US: 135,000	Brett Eldredge
2017	"The Long Way"	65	7	3	—	7	RIAA: Platinum; MC: Gold	US: 137,000	Brett Eldredge
2018	"Love Someone"	52	8	2	—	20	RIAA: Gold		Brett Eldredge
2020	"Gabrielle"	—	29	27	—	—			Sunday Drive
2020	"Under the Mistletoe" (with Kelly Clarkson)	59	10	—	68	—			When Christmas Comes Around...
2021	"Good Day (2021)"	—	—	54	—	—			Sunday Drive
2022	"Songs About You"	—	43	38	—	—			Songs About You
"—" denotes releases that did not chart

=== As featured artist ===
Year	Single	Peak chart positions							Certifications	Album
Year	Single	US	US Country Songs	US Country Airplay	AUS	CAN	CAN Country	SCO	Certifications	Album
2016	"Forever Country" (as part of Artists of Then, Now & Forever)	21	1	33	26	25	39	29	RIAA: Gold	Non-album single

=== Promotional singles ===
Year	Single	Album
2021	"Holy Water"	Songs About You
2022	"Want That Back"	Songs About You

== Other charted songs ==
Year	Single	Peak chart positions						Certifications	Album
Year	Single	US Country Songs	US Country Airplay	US Country Digital	US AC	US Holiday	UK	Certifications	Album
2015	"Just a Taste"	44	—	30	—	—	—		Illinois
2015	"Lose It All"	—	—	37	—	—	—		Illinois
2016	"Baby, It's Cold Outside" (featuring Meghan Trainor)	26	36	—	1	83	51	BPI: Silver	Glow
2017	"It's Beginning to Look a Lot Like Christmas"	—	39	—	—	—	—		Glow
2017	"Let It Snow! Let It Snow! Let It Snow!"	—	45	—	—	—	—		Glow
2017	"No Stopping You"	50	—	22	—	—	—		Brett Eldredge
2021	"It's the Most Wonderful Time of the Year"	43	—	—	—	—	—		Mr. Christmas
"—" denotes releases that did not chart

== Music videos ==
Year	Video	Director	Ref.
2010	"Raymond"	Shaun Silva	
2013	"Don't Ya"	Mason Dixon	
2014	"Beat of the Music"	Shane Drake	
2014	"Mean to Me"	Shane Drake	
2015	"Lose My Mind"	Joel Robertson	
2016	"Drunk on Your Love"	Joel Robertson	
2016	"Wanna Be That Song"	Trey Fanjoy	
2016	"Forever Country" (among Artists of Then, Now & Forever)	Joseph Kahn	
2017	"Somethin' I'm Good At"	Ethan Lader	
2017	"The Long Way"	Jim Shea	
2018	"Love Someone"	Unlisted	
2020	"Gabrielle"	Unlisted	
2020	"Under the Mistletoe" (with Kelly Clarkson)	Jay Martin	
2021	"Holy Water"	Unlisted	
2022	"Want That Back"	Unlisted	
