= University Press =

A university press is an academic publishing house that is typically affiliated with a large research university.

University Press may refer to:

- University Press (Florida Atlantic University), a student-run newspaper at Florida Atlantic University in Boca Raton, Florida
- University Press (Lamar University), a student-run newspaper at Lamar University in Beaumont, Texas
- University Press of America, an academic book publisher, part of the Rowman & Littlefield Publishing Group
- University Press plc, an academic book publisher, headquartered in Ibadan, Nigeria

== See also ==
- List of university presses
- Category:University presses
- Category:University presses by country
