= Welcome to Reality =

Welcome to Reality may refer to:

- Welcome to Reality (album), a 2007 album by Ross Copperman
- Welcome to Reality (EP), a 1981 EP by the Adolescents
