= Somethin' I'm Good At =

Single by Brett Eldredge

from the album Brett Eldredge
- Released: February 24, 2017
- Genre: Country
- Length: 3:37
- Label: Atlantic Nashville
- Songwriters: Brett Eldredge; Tom Douglas
- Producers: Ross Copperman; Brett Eldredge

Brett Eldredge singles chronology
| "Wanna Be That Song" (2016) | "Somethin' I'm Good At" (2017) | "The Long Way" (2017) |

"Somethin' I'm Good At" is a song co-written and recorded by American country music artist Brett Eldredge. It was co-written with Tom Douglas and released on February 24, 2017 as the lead single from Eldredge's self-titled fourth studio album.

== Background ==
The song was written in an hour after a five-hour session in which Eldredge worked on a ballad, and was recorded out of a desire to be spontaneous and have fun. Eldredge said of the song: "It made us write one of the craziest, out of nowhere fun songs I've ever written. I've never had so much fun recording." His ad libs and laughter were left on the final recording. Douglas and producer Ross Copperman also provided backing vocals.

== Commercial performance ==
"Somethin' I'm Good At" peaked at number 21 on the Billboard Country Airplay chart, making it Eldredge's first single to miss the top 10 since "It Ain't Gotta Be Love" in 2011. The song has sold 135,000 copies in the US as of July 2017.

== Music video ==
The music video for the song was directed by Ethan Lader and released on February 27, 2017. It features Eldredge dressed in a suit setting off a chain of events as he walks down a street.

== Credits and personnel ==
Credits adapted from AllMusic.

- Dave Cohen – keyboards
- Ross Copperman – backing vocals, keyboards, programming, production, recording
- Josh Ditty – engineering
- Tom Douglas – backing vocals
- Dan Dugmore – lap steel guitar
- Brett Eldredge – lead vocals
- Fred Eltringham – drums
- David LaBruyere – bass guitar
- Justin Niebank – mixing
- Andy Skib – background vocals, acoustic guitar, electric guitar, keyboards, programming, recording
- Derek Wells – acoustic guitar, electric guitar

== Charts ==
=== Weekly charts ===
| Chart (2017) | Peak position |
|---|---|
| Canada Country (Billboard) | 25 |
| US Bubbling Under Hot 100 (Billboard) | 7 |
| US Country Airplay (Billboard) | 21 |
| US Hot Country Songs (Billboard) | 22 |

=== Year-end charts ===
| Chart (2017) | Position |
|---|---|
| US Hot Country Songs (Billboard) | 61 |

== Certification and sales ==
| Region | Certification | Certified units/sales |
|---|---|---|
| Canada (Music Canada) | Gold | 40,000^{‡} |
| United States (RIAA) | Gold | 500,000^{‡} |
^{‡} Sales+streaming figures based on certification alone.
