= Sunday Drive =

Studio album by Brett Eldredge
- Released: July 10, 2020
- Studios: Shirk Studios (Chicago); Sound Emporium (Nashville, Tennessee)
- Genre: Country
- Length: 43:35
- Label: Warner
- Producers: Ian Fitchuk; Daniel Tashian

Brett Eldredge chronology
Brett Eldredge (2017)	Sunday Drive (2020)	Mr. Christmas (2021)

Singles from Sunday Drive
- 1. "Gabrielle" Released: April 17, 2020; 2. "Good Day" Released: March 1, 2021

Sunday Drive is the fifth studio album by American country music artist Brett Eldredge. It was released on July 10, 2020, via Warner Records.

== Content ==
The album is Eldredge's first in three years, following his 2017 self-titled album. Before working on the album, Eldredge disassociated himself from social media. In the process of writing songs for the album, Eldredge worked with solely his guitar and a notepad. Sunday Drive was produced by Ian Fitchuk and Daniel Tashian, who also worked on Kacey Musgraves' Golden Hour two years prior. In the process of recording the album, Eldredge took Fitchuk and Tashian to his hometown of Paris, Illinois to show the two the "Midwest values" which he felt were part of his life. They then recorded the album at Shirk Studios in Chicago. "Gabrielle" is the album's lead single.

== Track listing ==
Sunday Drive track listing
No.	Title	Writer(s)	Length
1.	"Where the Heart Is"	Brett Eldredge; Jessie Jo Dillon; Tyler Johnson	4:07
2.	"The One You Need"	Eldredge; Dillon; Matt Rogers	4:05
3.	"Magnolia"	Eldredge; Scooter Carusoe	3:24
4.	"Crowd My Mind"	Eldredge; Ross Copperman	3:08
5.	"Good Day"	Eldredge; Daniel Tashian; Ian Fitchuk	3:25
6.	"Fall for Me"	Eldredge; Tashian; Fitchuk	3:35
7.	"Sunday Drive"	Barry Dean; Don Mescall; Steve Robson	4:53
8.	"When I Die"	Eldredge; Tashian; Fitchuk	3:07
9.	"Gabrielle"	Eldredge; Tashian; Fitchuk	3:36
10.	"Fix a Heart"	Eldredge; Carusoe	3:59
11.	"Then You Do"	Eldredge; Carusoe	3:17
12.	"Paris, Illinois"	Eldredge; Tashian; Fitchuk	2:59
Total length:			43:35

== Personnel ==
Adapted from the album's liner notes.

Vocals

- Brett Eldredge – vocals (all tracks), background vocals (1)
- Sarah Buxton – background vocals (5, 6, 8)
- Daniel Tashian – background vocals (3–5, 8)

Instrumentation

- Ian Fitchuk – drums (1–6, 8–12), percussion (3, 6, 8–11), bass (3, 5, 8–11), congas (9), acoustic guitar (1, 2, 4–6, 8, 11), piano (2, 7, 11, 12), organ (2, 10, 11), upright piano (8, 10), Hammond B3 (9)
- Daniel Tashian – bass (1, 2, 4, 6), acoustic guitar (1, 2, 5, 6, 8, 9, 11), electric guitar (1, 3, 6, 9, 10, 11), electric mandolin (2), mandolin (3, 9, 11) lap steel guitar (4–6, 8), hi-strung guitar (9), hi-strung acoustic guitar (11), piano (9), upright piano (10), claps (3)
- Josh Moore – piano (1, 4, 5), upright piano (3, 6), organ (1, 3, 4), Mellotron (5, 6, 8), synthesizer (6, 8), keyboards (8), Wurlitzer (8), pump organ (12), percussion loops (1), claps (3), percussion (5), acoustic guitar (3), hi-strung guitar (5), hi-strung acoustic guitar (8), bass (12)
- Tom Bukovac – electric guitar (1, 3, 10, 11), 12-string electric guitar (5)
- Alicia Engstrom – violin (1, 2, 7, 11, 12)
- Kristin Weber – violin (1, 2, 7, 11, 12)
- Betsy Lamb – viola (1, 2, 7, 11, 12)
- Austin Hoke – cello (1, 2, 7, 11, 12)
- Leif Shires – trumpet (10, 12)
- Sarah Robinson – French horn (10, 12)
- Oscar Utterstrom – trombone (10, 12)
- Tyler Summers – tenor saxophone (10, 12)

Technical

- Ian Fitchuk – producer
- Daniel Tashian – producer
- Ryan Hewitt – mixing (Lockstock Studio, Nashville)
- Sean Williamson – assistant engineer
- Josh Moore – editing
- Jordan Lehning – editing, strings and horns arrangement (1, 2, 7, 10, 11, 12)

Imagery

- Mike Dupree – creative direction
- Mike Moore – art direction and design
- Greg Noire – photography
- Katy Robbins – styling
- Kirsten Kelly – grooming

== Charts ==
Chart performance for Sunday Drive
Chart (2020)	Peak position
Scottish Albums (Official Charts)	76
US Billboard 200	42
US Top Country Albums (Billboard)	5
