= Heather Morgan (songwriter) =

American singer-songwriter

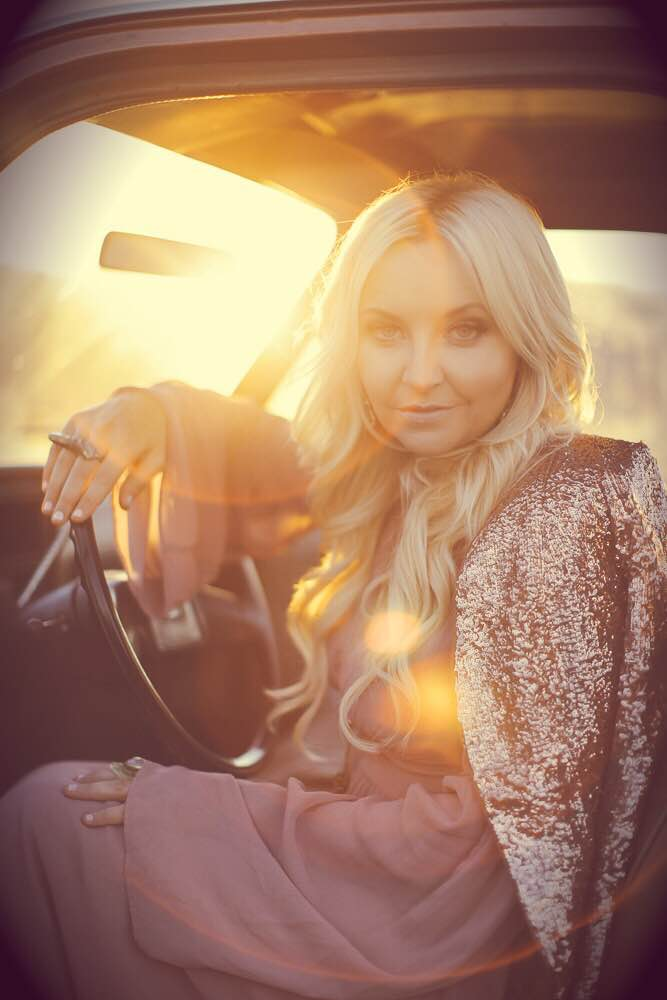

Background information
- Born: Heather Lynn Morgan; 1984 (age 41/42)
- Origin: Richardson, Texas, United States
- Genres: Country
- Occupations: Singer-songwriter; musician
- Years active: 2004–present
- Label: Eleven Feathers
- Website: heathermorganmusic.com

Heather Lynn Morgan is an American country music singer-songwriter from Richardson, Texas. After graduating from TCU, Heather signed her first publishing deal with Warner Chappell Music. Her songs have been featured on the TV show Nashville and recorded by Keith Urban, Brett Eldredge, Sara Evans, Eli Young Band, Maddie & Tae, and more. She is now a staff writer at Sony ATV Music, and had her first number 1 single in June 2014 with Brett Eldredge's "Beat of the Music". and was then awarded 2015 BMI Song of the Year. "Lose My Mind" was Heather's second number 1 single in October 2015. That year she was also nominated for Music Row's Breakthrough Songwriter of the Year Award, and took part as a songwriter in the 2015 ACM Lifting Lives Music Camp.

On 5 October 2018 she released her debut studio album Borrowed Heart produced by Paul Moak.

== Discography ==
- Borrowed Heart (2018)

== Songwriter discography ==
Year	Artist	Album	Title	Co-writers
2011	Billy Ray Cyrus	I'm American	"We Fought Hard"	Ross Copperman, John Kennedy
2011	Jennette McCurdy	Jennette McCurdy	"Generation Love"	Ross Copperman, Tom Douglas
2011	Brett Eldredge	Bring You Back	"Beat of the Music"	Ross Copperman, Brett Eldredge
2011	Brett Eldredge	Bring You Back	"Bring You Back"	Ross Copperman
2013	Keith Urban	Fuse	"Love's Poster Child"	Ross Copperman
2013	Eli Young Band	10,000 Towns	"Angel Like You"	Mike Eli, Liz Rose
2014	Ashley Gearing	Boomerang	"Boomerang"	Jaren Johnston, Jimmie Allen
2014	Sara Evans	Slow Me Down	"Slow Me Down"	Jimmy Robbins, Marv Green
2015	David Fanning	—N/a	"Doin' Country Right"	Jimmy Robbins, Josh Osborne
2015	Brett Eldredge	Illinois	"Just a Taste"	Brett Eldredge, Ross Copperman
2015	Brett Eldredge	Illinois	"Lose My Mind"	Brett Eldredge, Ross Copperman
2015	Brett Eldredge	Illinois	"Shadow"	Brett Eldredge, Ross Copperman
2015	Brett Eldredge	Illinois	"You Can't Stop Me"	Brett Eldredge, Ross Copperman
2015	Brett Eldredge	Illinois	"Going Away for a While"	Brett Eldredge, Ross Copperman
2015	Maddie & Tae	Start Here	"Your Side of Town"	Maddie & Tae
2016	Cole Swindell	You Should Be Here	"Home Game"	Aaron Eshuis, Brandon Lay
2016	Martina McBride	Reckless	"Reckless"	Sarah Buxton, Zach Crowell
2016	Joe	#MyNameIsJoeThomas	"Hollow"	Josh Hoge, Zach Crowell
2016	Dierks Bentley	Black	"I'll Be the Moon"	Ryan Hurd, Matt Dragstrem
2016	Maren Morris	Hero	"Bummin' Cigarettes"	Maren Morris, Ian Fitchuk
2016	Kenny Chesney	Cosmic Hallelujah	"Sometown Somewhere"	Ross Copperman, Josh Osborne
2017	Sara Evans	Words	"Marquee Sign"	Sara Evans, Jimmy Robbins
2018	Dierks Bentley	The Mountain	"Stranger to Myself"	Dierks Bentley, Ross Copperman
2018	Brett Eldredge	Brett Eldredge	"Love Someone"	Brett Eldredge, Ross Copperman
