= Mr. Christmas (Brett Eldredge album) =

Studio album by Brett Eldredge
- Released: October 22, 2021
- Recorded: 2021
- Genres: Country; Christmas
- Length: 37:29
- Label: Atlantic Nashville
- Producers: Rob Mounsey; Jay Newland

Brett Eldredge chronology
Sunday Drive (2020)	Mr. Christmas (2021)	Songs About You (2022)

Singles from Mr. Christmas
- 1. "It's the Most Wonderful Time of the Year" Released: October 22, 2021

Mr. Christmas is the sixth studio album American country music singer Brett Eldredge, released on October 22, 2021, by Atlantic Nashville. This is his second Christmas album after Glow (2016). The album features cover songs of Christmas songs as well as two originals.

== Background ==
Eldredge announced his second Christmas album in September 2021. The album features two original songs that Eldredge co-wrote with long-time collaborator Ross Copperman.

== Release and promotion ==
Mr. Christmas was released on October 22, 2021, by Atlantic Nashville. "It's the Most Wonderful Time of the Year" was released as a single ahead of the album. From November 13, to December 30, 2021, Eldredge promoted the album on his Glow Live Tour.

On November 29, 2021, he appeared on CMA Country Christmas and performed "Merry Christmas Baby".

== Critical reception ==
Pip Ellwood-Hughes of Entertainment Focus says that "Eldredge is making a convincing case to be mentioned in the same breath as Michael Bublé and Mariah Carey when it comes to Christmas music." Ellwood-Hughes also praised his rendition of "It's the Most Wonderful Time of the Year", "Eldredge immediately transports you back to the golden age of the big band as his velvety voice wraps around the festive classic and the orchestra behind him wows with their stunning instrumentation."

The Cedar Rapids Gazette's Alan Sculley also mentioned Bublé but said that "Eldredge might give Michael Bublé a run for his money as music's leading Sinatra-esque Christmas crooner."

== Track listing ==
No.	Title	Writer(s)	Length
1.	"It's the Most Wonderful Time of the Year"	Edward Pola; George Wyle	2:57
2.	"Mr. Christmas"	Brett Eldredge; Ross Copperman	3:36
3.	"Merry Christmas Baby"	Lou Baxter; Johnny Moore	3:45
4.	"Jingle Bells"	James Lord Pierpont	3:27
5.	"God Rest Ye Merry Gentlemen"	Traditional	3:24
6.	"I Heard the Bells on Christmas Day"	Henry Wadsworth Longfellow	2:51
7.	"Rudolph the Red-Nosed Reindeer"	Johnny Marks	3:11
8.	"Cool Yule"	Steve Allen	3:07
9.	"Santa Claus Is Comin' to Town"	J. Fred Coots; Haven Gillespie	2:51
10.	"Feels Like Christmas"	Eldredge	4:14
11.	"O Come, All Ye Faithful"	Traditional	4:06
Total length:			37:29

== Personnel ==
- Credits adapted from AllMusic.

Vocals

- Brett Eldredge – all vocals
- Nicki Richards — background vocals
- Catherine Russell – background vocals
- Anthony Snitzer – soloist
- David Spinozza – soloist

Musicians

- Emily Brausa – cello
- Claire Chan – violin
- Tom Cobb – contrabass
- Jonathan Dinklage – viola
- David Finck – bass
- Aaron Heick – alto saxophone
- Jen Herman – viola
- Clarice Jensen – cello
- Tony Kadleck – trumpet
- Adda Kridler – violin
- Brandon Lee – trumpet
- Ann Lehmann – violin
- Matthew Lehmann – violin
- Dennis Mackrel – drums
- Nick Marchione – trumpet
- Lisa Matricardi — viola
- Maixm Moston – viola
- Rob Mounsey – piano
- Jeff Nelson — bass trombone
- Tomina Parvanova – harp
- Charles Pillow – alto saxophone
- Dave Riekenberg – alto saxophone
- Benjamin Russell – violin
- Antoine Silverman – violin
- Andy Snitzer – tenor saxophone
- David Spinozza – guitar
- Entcho Todorov – violin
- Scott Wendholt — trumpet
- Anja Wood – cello
- Emily Yarbrough – violin

Production

- Thom Beemer – Pro Tools
- Joe Cilento – assistant
- Joe D'Ambrosio – production coordination
- Mark Dupree - creative director
- Tiffany Gifford – stylist
- Scott Hendricks – A&R
- Edwin Huet – Pro Tools
- Natasha Leibel – grooming
- Henry Wadsworth Longfellow – arranger
- Mike Moore – art direction, design
- Carlos Mora – assistant
- Rob Mounsey – arranger, producer
- Ian Muir – assistant
- Jay Newland – engineer, mixing, producer
- Frederick Oakeley – arranger
- John Peets – management
- James Pierpont — arranger
- Steve Sacco – assistant
- Antoine Silverman – concert master
- John Francis Wade – arranger
- Mark Wilder — mastering
- James Younger – artist development

== Release history ==
Mr. Christmas release history
Region	Date	Format	Label	Catalog number	Ref.
Various	October 22, 2021	CD; digital download; streaming	Atlantic Nashville		
