= Greg Noire =

American concert photographer

- Born: Gregory Ehiabhi Oribhabor; Granbury, Texas, U.S.
- Occupation: Concert photographer
- Years active: 2009–present

Gregory Ehiabhi Oribhabor, known as Greg Noire, is an American concert and portrait photographer based in Houston, Texas. Noire has shot for Drake, Travis Scott, Chance the Rapper, Kendrick Lamar, Childish Gambino, Demi Lovato, among others.

== Biography ==
Noire has Nigerian ancestry and was born in Granbury, Texas. He is based in Houston, Texas.

Noire attended Lamar University in Beaumont, Texas, with a major in corporate communications. He discovered photography while working at the photo department of Sam's Club. Inspired by customers' film rolls, he bought a Fujifilm FinePix camera and began taking around 500 pictures a day. Noire also took a photography class which he said "changed [his] life". Later, he got access to a DSLR camera through working at Lamar's University Press newspaper as a photojournalist. He used this camera to enter contests and shoot local events.

In 2009, Noire was invited to shoot the rap group The Clipse, because he knew members of the opening act, The Nice Guys. Noire said "I fell in love immediately, even though I initially had absolutely no idea what I was doing". In 2014, Noire shot for the music festival Lollapalooza, which was Noire's first gig that paid highly. Noire quit his job and became a full-time concert photographer in 2015. In 2017, he started a podcast, The Greg Noire Show, documenting experiences in his career.

In 2019, Complex described Noire as "one of the most sought after concert photographers in the industry". Some artists Noire has shot for include Drake, Travis Scott, Chance the Rapper, Kendrick Lamar, Childish Gambino, and Demi Lovato. As well, he has shot the music festivals Coachella, Lollapalooza, Austin City Limits, Astroworld Festival, and the Voodoo Music + Arts Experience.

== Style and influences ==
Part of Noire's pseudonym originated from the film noir genre. The genre, especially Citizen Kane, influenced him to use black and white photography for capturing emotion. Noire's biggest photographer influence is Chi Modu, while others include Gordon Parks, Gilles Bensimon, Neal Preston, Dana Scruggs, Joshua Kissi, and Devin Allen. While photographing concerts, Noire treats it as a studio session to create "intimate and vulnerable" photos. He aims to "de-concert [his] concert photography". Noire prefers to wait for specific moments instead of shooting in volume.
