= Love Someone (Brett Eldredge song) =

Single by Brett Eldredge

from the album Brett Eldredge
- Released: June 18, 2018
- Recorded: 2017
- Genre: Country
- Length: 3:31 (album version); 3:04 (radio edit)
- Label: Atlantic Nashville
- Songwriter(s): Brett Eldredge; Ross Copperman; Heather Morgan
- Producer(s): Ross Copperman

Brett Eldredge singles chronology
"The Long Way" (2017)	"Love Someone" (2018)	"Gabrielle" (2020)

"Love Someone" is a song written and recorded by American country music singer Brett Eldredge for his self-titled third studio album (2017). Ross Copperman and Heather Morgan co-wrote the song, while Copperman co-produced the song with Eldredge. "Love Someone" was serviced to American country radio on June 18, 2018 through Atlantic Records and Warner Music Nashville as the third official single from Brett Eldredge.

== Music videos ==
The first official video was released in August 2018 and contains footage of Eldredge performing in concerts filmed during his The Long Way Tour in 2018. He also released another video a month later titled "Love Someone (The Edgar Cut)". The music video features Eldredge's dog named Edgar and shows them doing things together including having a candlelit steak dinner, and riding in a motorcycle and sidecar.

== Charts ==
=== Weekly charts ===
Chart (2018–2019)	Peak position
Canada Country (Billboard)	20
US Billboard Hot 100	52
US Country Airplay (Billboard)	2
US Hot Country Songs (Billboard)	8

=== Year-end charts ===
Chart (2019)	Position
US Country Airplay (Billboard)	30
US Hot Country Songs (Billboard)	45

== Certifications ==
Region	Certification	Certified units/sales
United States (RIAA)	Gold	500,000^{‡}
^{‡} Sales+streaming figures based on certification alone.
