= All She Wrote (Ross Copperman song) =

Single by Ross Copperman

from the album Welcome To Reality
- Released: 7 May 2007
- Recorded: 2007
- Genre: Pop
- Length: 3:41
- Label: RCA
- Songwriters: Ross Copperman, Lori Wilshire, Micah Wilshire

Ross Copperman singles chronology
"As I Choke" (2007)	"All She Wrote" (2007)	"Found You" (2007)

"All She Wrote" is a single released by Ross Copperman in the UK on 7 May 2007 as the second single, but first major one, off his album Welcome To Reality. "All She Wrote" debuted at number 44 on the UK Singles Chart, later peaking at number 39. The single also reached the top 30 in Scotland.

== Composition and reception ==
According to Copperman, the song is about a girl "who feels like nobody pays attention to her, feeling very lonely. But she then finds hope and realises there's someone out there for her." Expressing a fondness for writing from others' perspectives, Copperman added that the song is "also loosely based on a girl I went to college with and a few of my feelings – it's impossible to completely disengage your feelings."

In a two-star review of the single, The Daily Mirror wrote: "a ragbag of Oasis swagger, Coldplay polish, thoughtful bellyaching and what somebody at his record company bafflingly calls 'Robbie Williams charisma' is the inevitable result."

== Video ==
The video features Ross on the set of film or TV show playing the piano with his band. The rest of the video switches between Ross interacting with his love interest (later in the video he sings to her in the rain, which we discover is artificial) and him singing.

== Track listings ==
2 Track CD

1. "All She Wrote"
2. "Die in Vain"

== Charts ==
Chart (2007)	Peak position
Scottish Singles Chart (Official Charts Company)	30
UK Singles Chart (Official Charts Company)	39
