= Brett Eldredge (album) =

Studio album by Brett Eldredge
- Released: August 4, 2017
- Studio: The Castle
- Genre: Country
- Length: 41:58
- Label: Atlantic Records
- Producer: Ross Copperman; Brett Eldredge; Andy Skib; Jordan Reynolds

Brett Eldredge chronology
Glow (2016)	Brett Eldredge (2017)	Sunday Drive (2020)

Singles from Brett Eldredge
- 1. "Somethin' I'm Good At" Released: February 24, 2017; 2. "The Long Way" Released: August 21, 2017; 3. "Love Someone" Released: June 18, 2018

Brett Eldredge is the fourth studio album by American country music artist of the same name. It was released on August 4, 2017 by Atlantic Records.

== Content ==
The lead single is "Somethin' I'm Good At". The album's second single, "The Long Way", released to country radio on August 21, 2017. "Love Someone" was released June 18, 2018 as the third single.

== Critical reception ==
Professional ratings
Review scores
Source	Rating
AllMusic	4/5 stars

Rating it 4 out of 5 stars, AllMusic reviewer Stephen Thomas Erlewine wrote that it "showcases the singer's softer side more than its predecessors". Matt Bjorke of Roughstock reviewed the album favorably, stating that Eldredge "has figured out what makes his music get even better and better: Personal vulnerability mixed with passionate performances. These are both something which Brett Eldredge is packed to the gills with." Cillea Houghton of Sounds Like Nashville was also positive, writing that "Charming, emotional and diverse are descriptions that suit Brett Eldredge, but predictable certainly isn’t with its eclectic mix of sounds, proving that Eldredge has grown as an artist."

== Commercial performance ==
Brett Eldredge debuted at number two on the US Billboard 200 with 45,000 album-equivalent units, of which 36,000 were pure album sales. It is Eldredge's highest-charting album. The album sold a further 7,300 copies in the second week. It has sold 89,000 copies in the US as of September 2018.

== Track listing ==
No.	Title	Writer(s)	Producer	Length
1.	"Love Someone"	Eldredge; Ross Copperman; Heather Morgan	Copperman	3:31
2.	"Superhero"	Eldredge; Copperman; Morgan	Eldredge; Copperman	2:59
3.	"The Long Way"	Eldredge; Matt Rogers	Eldredge; Copperman	3:30
4.	"The Reason"	Eldredge; Copperman	Eldredge; Copperman	3:27
5.	"Somethin' I'm Good At"	Eldredge; Tom Douglas	Eldredge; Copperman	3:38
6.	"Haven't Met You"	Eldredge; Copperman; Morgan	Eldredge; Copperman	4:20
7.	"No Stopping You"	Eldredge; Douglas	Eldredge; Andy Skib	3:42
8.	"Brother"	Eldredge; Douglas	Eldredge; Copperman	3:32
9.	"Heartbreaker"	Eldredge; Copperman; Morgan	Eldredge; Copperman	3:26
10.	"Crystal Clear"	Eldredge; Morgan; Jordan Reynolds	Copperman	3:23
11.	"Cycles"	Eldredge; Rogers	Eldredge; Copperman	3:31
12.	"Castaway"	Eldredge; Reynolds	Reynolds	2:59
Total length:				41:58

== Personnel ==
Adapted from AllMusic

- Blake Bollinger - background vocals
- Dave Cohen - keyboards
- Ross Copperman - acoustic guitar, electric guitar, keyboards, programming, background vocals
- Kris Donegan - acoustic guitar, electric guitar
- Tom Douglas - keyboards, background vocals
- Dan Dugmore - lap steel guitar, pedal steel guitar
- Brett Eldredge - lead vocals, background vocals
- Fred Eltringham - drums
- Ian Fitchuk - drums
- Mark Hill - bass guitar
- Brandon Hood - electric guitar
- David LaBruyere - bass guitar
- Jason Lehning - keyboards
- Tony Lucido - bass guitar
- Heather Morgan - background vocals
- Jordan Reynolds - acoustic guitar, keyboards, programming, background vocals
- Jeff Roach - keyboards
- Matt Rogers - background vocals
- Andy Skib - acoustic guitar, electric guitar, keyboards, programming, background vocals
- Derek Wells - acoustic guitar, electric guitar
- Micah Wilshire - background vocals

== Charts ==
=== Weekly charts ===
Chart (2017)	Peak position
Australian Albums (ARIA)	61
Canadian Albums (Billboard)	10
New Zealand Heatseekers Albums (RMNZ)	9
US Billboard 200	2
US Top Country Albums (Billboard)	1

=== Year-end charts ===
Chart (2017)	Position
US Top Country Albums (Billboard)	46
Chart (2018)	Position
US Top Country Albums (Billboard)	73
