= Songs About You (album) =

Studio album by Brett Eldredge
- Released: June 17, 2022
- Genre: Country
- Length: 37:20
- Label: Warner Music Nashville
- Producer: Nathan Chapman; Dave Cobb; Jordan Reynolds; Mark Trussell

Brett Eldredge chronology
Mr. Christmas (2021)	Songs About You (2022)	The Classics with Mr. Christmas (2023)

Singles from Songs About You
- 1. "Songs About You" Released: April 25, 2022

Songs About You is the seventh studio album by American country music artist Brett Eldredge. It was released on June 17, 2022, by Warner Music Nashville.

== Content ==
Prior to the release of the album, Eldredge told Billboard that he was inspired by some of his favorite albums by artists such as Ray Charles, Frank Sinatra, and Nat "King" Cole, and that said albums made him want to place increased prominence on his vocals. Nathan Chapman, Dave Cobb, Mark Trussell, and Jordan Reynolds alternated as producers. Eldredge co-wrote every song on the album, collaborating with Heather Morgan on eight of them. The album's lead single is its title track, which was released to country radio in February 2022.

== Critical reception ==
Rating it four out of five stars, Stephen Thomas Erlewine of AllMusic wrote, " he knows how to modulate his delivery so he not only keeps the melody in the forefront but he can also steer the listener through slow patches with an easy grin. That gift makes Songs About You an endearing country-pop record". An uncredited review from Off the Record UK stated, "ows an artist fully comfortable, finally, with his own sonic identity – imbibing many influences from jazz to soul to country, seamlessly, without losing any of his own charm and character."

== Track listing ==
No.	Title	Writer(s)	Length
1.	"Can't Keep Up"	Brett Eldredge; Nathan Chapman; Heather Morgan	3:08
2.	"Songs About You"	Eldredge; Jessie Jo Dillon; Ben West	3:22
3.	"I Feel Fine"	Eldredge; Chapman; Morgan	3:07
4.	"What Else Ya Got"	Eldredge; Chapman; Morgan	2:52
5.	"Hideaway"	Eldredge; Morgan; Mark Trussell	2:43
6.	"Get Out of My House"	Eldredge; Trussell; Natalie Hemby	3:09
7.	"Home Sweet Love"	Eldredge; Morgan; Trussell	3:38
8.	"Want That Back"	Eldredge; Scooter Carusoe	3:15
9.	"Wait Up for Me"	Eldredge; Morgan; Trussell	2:59
10.	"Where Do I Sign"	Eldredge; Chapman; Morgan	3:18
11.	"Holy Water"	Eldredge; Morgan; Trussell	2:44
12.	"Where the Light Meets the Sea"	Eldredge; Jordan Reynolds	3:05
Total length:			37:20

== Personnel ==
Adapted from liner notes.

=== Musicians ===
- Roy Agee – trombone (tracks 1, 10)
- Brian Allen – bass guitar (track 11)
- Rahsaan Barber – alto saxophone (tracks 1, 10)
- Sarah Buxton – background vocals (tracks 9, 12)
- Nathan Chapman – bass guitar (tracks 1–4, 10), drums (track 4)
- Dave Cobb – acoustic guitar (track 11)
- Evan Cobb – tenor saxophone (tracks 1, 10)
- Kris Donegan – guitar (track 12)
- Nathan Dugger – electric guitar (tracks 2, 6–8), guitar (track 9)
- Emmanuel Echem – trumpet (tracks 1, 10)
- Stanton Edward – baritone guitar (track 4), electric guitar (tracks 1–4, 10)
- Brett Eldredge – lead vocals (all tracks), background vocals (track 7)
- Ian Fitchuk – piano (track 12)
- Kevin Gatzke – baritone saxophone (tracks 1, 10)
- Tony Lucido – bass guitar (tracks 6–9)
- Paul Moak – keyboards (tracks 7, 8)
- Heather Morgan – background vocals (tracks 1, 3, 4, 7, 8, 10)
- Chris Powell – drums (track 11)
- Dustin Ransom – keyboards (tracks 6, 9)
- Jordan Reynolds – acoustic guitar (track 12), dobro (track 12), keyboards (track 12), drum programming (track 12), background vocals (track 12)
- Mike Rojas – B-3 organ (tracks 1–4, 10), mellotron (tracks 2, 3), piano (tracks 1–3, 10), Wurlitzer (track 2)
- Aaron Sterling – drums (tracks 1–4, 6, 9, 10), percussion (tracks 1–4, 10)
- John Thomason – bass guitar (track 12)
- Phillip Towns – keyboards (track 11)
- Mark Trussell – acoustic guitar (tracks 5–8), bouzouki (track 8), electric guitar (tracks 6–8), drum programming (tracks 6, 7), hi-string guitar (track 8), keyboards (tracks 6, 7), resonator guitar (track 8), slide guitar (track 11), background vocals (tracks 6–9)
- Ben West – keyboards (track 2)
- Nir Z. – drums (tracks 7, 8)

=== Production ===
- Dave Cobb – producer (track 11)
- Nathan Chapman – producer (tracks 1–4, 10)
- Jordan Reynolds – producer (track 12)
- Mark Trussell – producer (tracks 5–9)

== Chart performance ==
Chart performance for Songs About You
Chart (2022)	Peak position
US Billboard 200	145
US Top Country Albums (Billboard)	16
