= The Long Way (song) =

Single by Brett Eldredge

from the album Brett Eldredge
- Released: August 21, 2017
- Recorded: August–September 2016
- Studio: The Castle (Nashville, TN)
- Genre: Country
- Length: 3:28
- Label: Atlantic Nashville
- Songwriters: Brett Eldredge; Matthew J Rogers
- Producers: Ross Copperman; Brett Eldredge

Brett Eldredge singles chronology
"Somethin' I'm Good At" (2017)	"The Long Way" (2017)	"Love Someone" (2018)

"The Long Way" is a song written and recorded by American country music singer Brett Eldredge for his self-titled third studio album (2017). Matthew J Rogers co-wrote the song, while Ross Copperman co-produced the song with Eldredge. It was first released digitally on May 12, 2017 as a promotional single for the album. "The Long Way" was serviced to American country radio on August 21, 2017 through Atlantic Records and Warner Music Nashville as the second official single from Brett Eldredge.

== Content ==
"The Long Way" is a midtempo country ballad with influences of pop music. The song is "a look into what I want to find in love," according to a press release from Eldredge. Lyrically, the song describes how a lover can get to know their partner on a deeper level by exploring their history and their hometown. "The Long Way" was written at a time when Eldredge was looking for true love and his cowriter, Matt Rogers, was soon to be married, which inspired the romantic lyrics. Certain details were inspired by the writers' upbringings while others were generalized.

== Critical reception ==
Cillea Houghton of Sounds Like Nashville wrote that "The Long Way" is a "standout track" on the album that "allows his voice to shine," and is a "real charmer." Top Country also labelled the song as a highlight of the album, writing, "the emotional melodies intertwine with the lyrics to make the story come to life, like any perfect country song." Taylor Weatherby of Billboard included "The Long Way" on a list of Eldredge's 10 best songs and wrote, "this love song from his latest record proves that he has quite the range -- while also giving further proof that he’s a king at writing lyrics that make you melt."

== Music video ==
The music video was directed by Jim Shea and premiered on CMT, GAC & CMT Music in October 2017. It features Eldredge and Sadie Robertson dancing. The video has since reached over 22 million views.

== Chart performance ==
"The Long Way" debuted at number 41 on the Billboard Hot Country Songs chart dated June 3, 2017. The song sold 11,000 copies in its first week, debuting at number 14 on the Country Digital Song Sales component chart. The song re-entered the chart at number 38 for the week of August 26, 2017 and has since reached a peak position of 23. "The Long Way" debuted at number 56 on the Country Airplay chart dated September 9, 2017. The song has sold 137,000 copies in the United States as of March 2018.

== Charts ==
=== Weekly charts ===
Chart (2017–2018)	Peak position
Canada Country (Billboard)	7
US Billboard Hot 100	65
US Country Airplay (Billboard)	3
US Hot Country Songs (Billboard)	7

=== Year-end charts ===
Chart (2017)	Position
US Hot Country Songs (Billboard)	97

Chart (2018)	Position
US Country Airplay (Billboard)	13
US Hot Country Songs (Billboard)	34

== Certifications ==
Region	Certification	Certified units/sales
Canada (Music Canada)	Gold	40,000^{‡}
United States (RIAA)	Platinum	1,000,000^{‡}
^{‡} Sales+streaming figures based on certification alone.

== Release history ==
Country	Date	Format	Label	Ref.
Worldwide	May 12, 2017	Digital download	Atlantic	
United States	August 21, 2017	Country radio	Atlantic; Warner Music Nashville	
