= Lose My Mind (Brett Eldredge song) =

Single by Brett Eldredge

from the album Illinois
- Released: May 4, 2015
- Recorded: 2015
- Genre: Country; country pop
- Length: 2:35
- Label: Atlantic Nashville
- Songwriters: Ross Copperman; Brett Eldredge; Heather Morgan; Brian Burton; Thomas Callaway; Gian Franco Reverberi; Gian Piero Reverberi
- Producers: Ross Copperman; Brett Eldredge

Brett Eldredge singles chronology
"Mean to Me" (2014)	"Lose My Mind" (2015)	"Drunk on Your Love" (2015)

Music video
- "Lose My Mind" on YouTube

"Lose My Mind" is a song co-written and recorded by American country music artist Brett Eldredge. It was released on May 4, 2015 as the first single from Eldredge's second studio album, Illinois. Eldredge co-wrote the song with Ross Copperman and Heather Morgan. Writing credit is also given to CeeLo Green, Danger Mouse, Gian Franco Reverberi and Gian Piero Reverberi for a line borrowed from Gnarls Barkley's "Crazy". Critics praised it for the mixture of both country and pop music elements throughout the production.

"Lose My Mind" reached number one on the Billboard Country Airplay chart, giving Eldredge his fourth consecutive number-one country hit. It also peaked at numbers 2 and 48 on both the Hot Country Songs and Hot 100 charts respectively. The song was certified Gold by the Recording Industry Association of America (RIAA), and has sold 506,000 copies in the United States as of April 2016. It achieved similar chart success in Canada, peaking at number 2 on the Canada Country chart and number 57 on the Canadian Hot 100 chart.

The accompanying music video for the song was directed by Joel Robertson.

== Critical reception ==
Billy Dukes of Taste of Country gave the song a favorable review. Dukes called the song "a brilliant mix of old and new," writing that "this unique stylist is falling deeper into a niche Eldredge started cutting on the Bring You Back album, and the format is better for it." Jason Scott of AXS gave the song three and a half stars out of five, saying that "from the electric guitar intro and the finger-snapping rhythm, the song is built on a solid foundation of pop varnish, buoyed by his more polished delivery."

== Chart performance ==
"Lose My Mind" debuted at number 34 on the US Billboard Country Airplay chart for the week of May 9, 2015. It also debuted at number 31 on the US Billboard Hot Country Songs and 17 on the US Billboard Bubbling Under Hot 100 Singles for the same debut week, selling 21,000 copies for the week. It reached No. 1 on Country Airplay for the chart of October 24, 2015, having reached No. 2 on the Hot Country Songs chart the week before. The song has sold 506,000 copies in the US as of April 2016.

== Track listing ==
Best Buy Single Release date: August 21, 2015

- 1. "Lose My Mind" – 2:35
- 2. "Illinois" – 3:20

== Music video ==
The music video was directed by Joel Robertson and premiered in April 2015. It co-stars Victoria's Secret model Rachel Hilbert.

== Charts and certifications ==
=== Weekly charts ===
Chart (2015)	Peak position
Canada Hot 100 (Billboard)	57
Canada Country (Billboard)	2
US Billboard Hot 100	48
US Country Airplay (Billboard)	1
US Hot Country Songs (Billboard)	2

=== Year-end charts ===
Chart (2015)	Position
Canada Country (Billboard)	1
US Country Airplay (Billboard)	3
US Hot Country Songs (Billboard)	14

=== Certifications ===
Region	Certification	Certified units/sales
Canada (Music Canada)	Gold	40,000^{*}
United States (RIAA)	Platinum	1,000,000^{‡} / 506,000
^{*} Sales figures based on certification alone.
