= Glow (Brett Eldredge album) =

Studio album by Brett Eldredge
- Released: October 28, 2016
- Genre: Country; Christmas
- Length: 36:39
- Label: Atlantic Nashville
- Producer: Jay Newland; Rob Mounsey

Brett Eldredge chronology
Illinois (2015)	Glow (2016)	Brett Eldredge (2017)

Glow is the third studio album by American country musician Brett Eldredge. Released on October 28, 2016, by Atlantic Nashville this is his first Christmas album.

A deluxe edition of the album was released on October 26, 2018, featuring 7 new songs.

== Commercial performance ==
The album debuted at No. 29 on Billboard 200, and No. 2 on the Top Country Albums chart, selling 14,000 copies in the United States in its first week. The album has sold 94,800 copies in the US as of January 2017.

== Track listing ==
Glow
No.	Title	Writer(s)	Length
1.	"Let It Snow! Let It Snow! Let It Snow!"	Sammy Cahn; Jule Styne	2:18
2.	"Baby, It's Cold Outside" (featuring Meghan Trainor)	Frank Loesser	2:53
3.	"I'll Be Home for Christmas"	Kim Gannon; Walter Kent; Buck Ram	3:26
4.	"The Christmas Song"	Robert Wells; Mel Tormé	4:34
5.	"Glow"	Brett Eldredge; Ross Copperman	3:29
6.	"White Christmas"	Irving Berlin	3:13
7.	"Winter Wonderland"	Felix Bernard; Dick Smith	2:43
8.	"Merry Little Christmas"	Hugh Martin; Ralph Blane	4:38
9.	"Silent Night"	Joseph Mohr; Franz Xaver Gruber	3:57
10.	"It's Beginning to Look a Lot Like Christmas"	Meredith Willson	2:54
11.	"First Noel"	Traditional	2:34
Total length:			36:39

The Deluxe release has additional tracks.

== Personnel ==
Adapted from AllMusic.

- Randy Andos – trombone
- Chris Cardona – viola
- Sean Carney – violin
- Tim Cobb – contrabass
- Joe D'Ambrosio – coordination
- Sylvia D'Avanzo – violin
- Barry Danielian – trumpet
- Michael Davis – trombone
- Jonathan Dinklage – violin
- Brett Eldredge – lead vocals
- David Finck – acoustic bass, electric bass
- Nick Finzer – trombone
- Chris Gelbuda – engineer
- Isabel Hagen – viola
- Aaron Heick – alto saxophone
- Josh Hoge – arranger
- Clarice Jensen – cello
- Rita Johnson – coordination
- Tony Kadleck – trumpet
- Adda Kridler – violin
- Dennis Mackrel – drums
- Greg Magers – engineer
- David Mann – alto saxophone
- Nick Marchione – trumpet
- Rob Mounsey – arranger, conductor, piano, producer
- Yuko Naito-Gotay – violin
- Jeff Nelson – trombone
- Jay Newland – engineer, mixing, producer
- Nate Odden – engineer
- Tomina Parvanova – harp
- Charles Pillow – tenor saxophone
- Dave Riekenberg – tenor saxophone
- Roger Rosenberg – baritone saxophone
- Antoine Silverman – concertmaster
- David Spinozza – acoustic guitar, electric guitar
- Meghan Trainor – vocals on "Baby, It's Cold Outside"
- Scott Wendholt – trumpet
- Mark Wilder – mastering
- Anja Wood – cello
- Paul Woodiel – violin

== Charts ==
=== Weekly charts ===
Chart (2016)	Peak position
US Billboard 200	29
US Top Country Albums (Billboard)	2
US Top Holiday Albums (Billboard)	2
Chart (2018–2021)	Peak position
Belgian Albums (Ultratop Flanders)	100
Canadian Albums (Billboard)	95
Danish Albums (Hitlisten)	32
Dutch Albums (Album Top 100)	56

=== Year-end charts ===
Chart (2017)	Position
US Top Country Albums (Billboard)	59
Chart (2018)	Position
US Top Country Albums (Billboard)	96
Chart (2019)	Position
US Top Country Albums (Billboard)	73
Chart (2020)	Position
US Top Country Albums (Billboard)	91
Chart (2021)	Position
US Top Country Albums (Billboard)	97
