= Raymond (song) =

Single by Brett Eldredge

from the album Bring You Back
- Released: September 27, 2010
- Genre: Country
- Length: 3:39
- Label: Atlantic Nashville
- Songwriters: Brett Eldredge; Brad Crisler
- Producer: Byron Gallimore

Brett Eldredge singles chronology
"Raymond" (2010)	"It Ain't Gotta Be Love" (2011)

"Raymond" is a song co-written and recorded by American country music artist Brett Eldredge. It was released on September 27, 2010, as his debut single from his debut studio album Bring You Back. Eldredge wrote the song with Brad Crisler.

== Content ==
"Raymond" tells the story of a maintenance worker at a nursing home and his relationship with a patient with Alzheimer's disease, who believes that the maintenance worker is her son Raymond, who was a private killed in action in Vietnam in 1971.

Eldredge was inspired to write the song because his grandmother had Alzheimer's disease for several years.

== Critical reception ==
Bobby Peacock of Roughstock gave the song four and a half stars out of five, calling it "one of those rare debut singles that gets your attention right away, while at the same time showing off a great deal of vocal and songwriting talent." The song also received a "thumbs up" from Engine 145 reviewer Janet Goodman, who wrote that it "is an impressive debut single with a vocal performance that blends earthiness with emotional highs, and a message that manages to remain sugar-free while leaving us with its hopeful refrain of kindness."

== Music video ==
Shaun Silva directed the music video which premiered in October 2010.

== Chart performance ==
"Raymond" debuted at number 52 on the U.S. Billboard Hot Country Songs chart for the week of October 16, 2010.

Chart (2010–2011)	Peak position
US Hot Country Songs (Billboard)	23

=== Year-end charts ===
Chart (2011)	Position
US Country Songs (Billboard)	84
