= Concert photography =

Photography genre

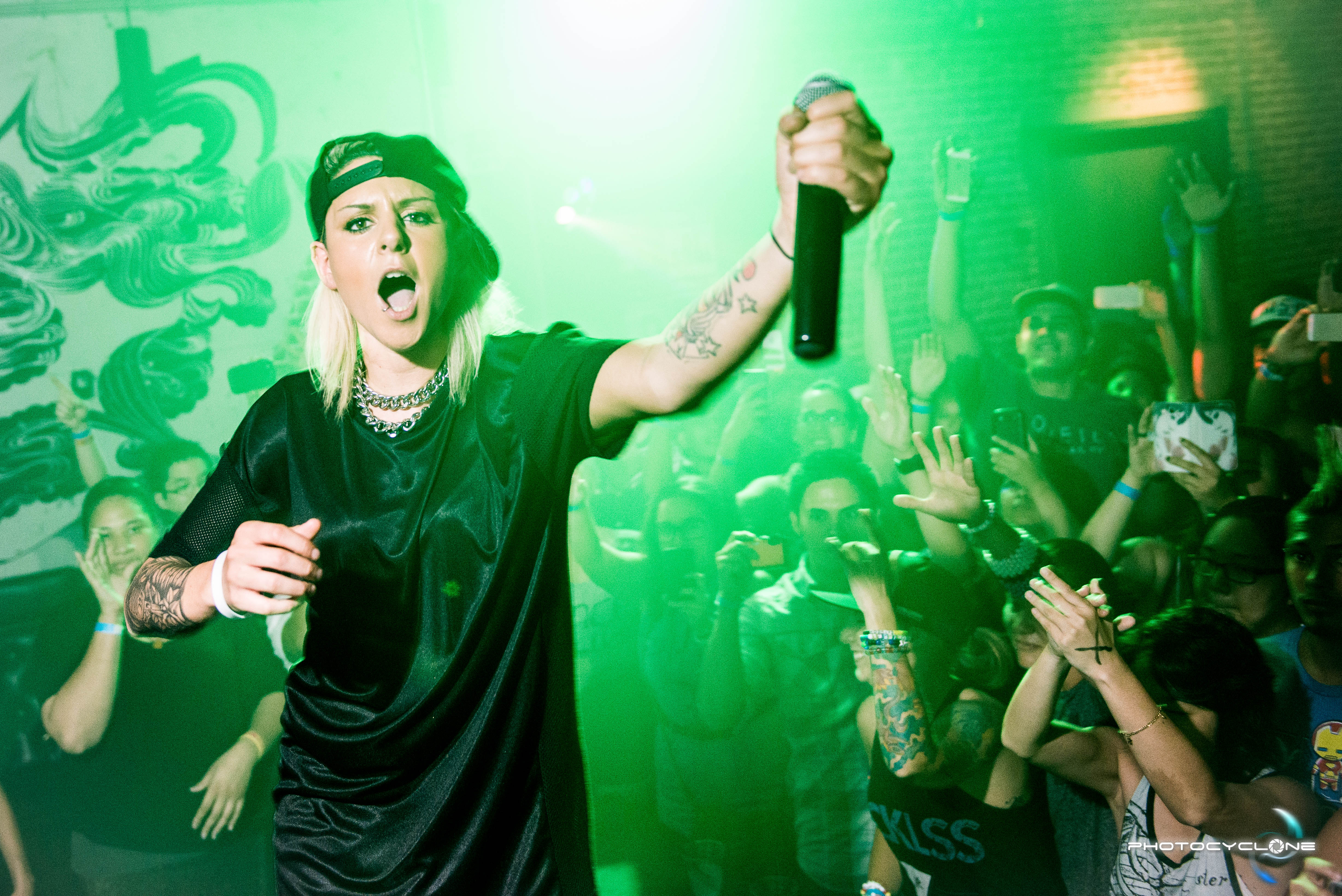
A photograph of a Christina Novelli concert in Honolulu, Hawaii

Concert photography is the photography of activities relating to concerts and music. It encompasses photographs of a band or musician as well as coverage of a concert. It is a minor commercial endeavour that supports in part of the efforts for many independent photographers.

== History ==
Like the technology of photography itself, the practice of photography has evolved and grown since the invention of the photographic art form in 1826 by Joseph Nicéphore Niépce. Concert photography began becoming popular with the advent of rock & roll, particularly during the height of popularity by such bands as The Beatles or the Rolling Stones. During the 1950s and 1960s, the desire for memorabilia was increased with every new musician or music group. During that time, some of the more respected music photographers included Gered Mankowitz (Rolling Stones), Robert Altman (Rolling Stone magazine) and Ethan Russell (Jim Morrison) amongst others.

== Technology ==
During the film era, photographers favoured colour negative film and medium format cameras, especially by Hasselblad. Today, many more concerts are photographed with digital SLR cameras as the digital convenience provides quick detection of lighting mistakes and allows creative approaches to be reviewed immediately. Despite diminishing film use, some concert photographers continue to shoot with film as they prefer the film aesthetic, and others are of the opinion that negative film captures more information than digital technology, and has less margin for exposure error. Certainly true in some cases, exposure latitude inherent in a camera's native Raw image format (which allows for more under and overexposure than JPEG) varies from manufacturer to manufacturer. All forms of RAW have a degree of exposure latitude which exceeds slide film — to which digital capture is commonly compared.

== Technical considerations ==
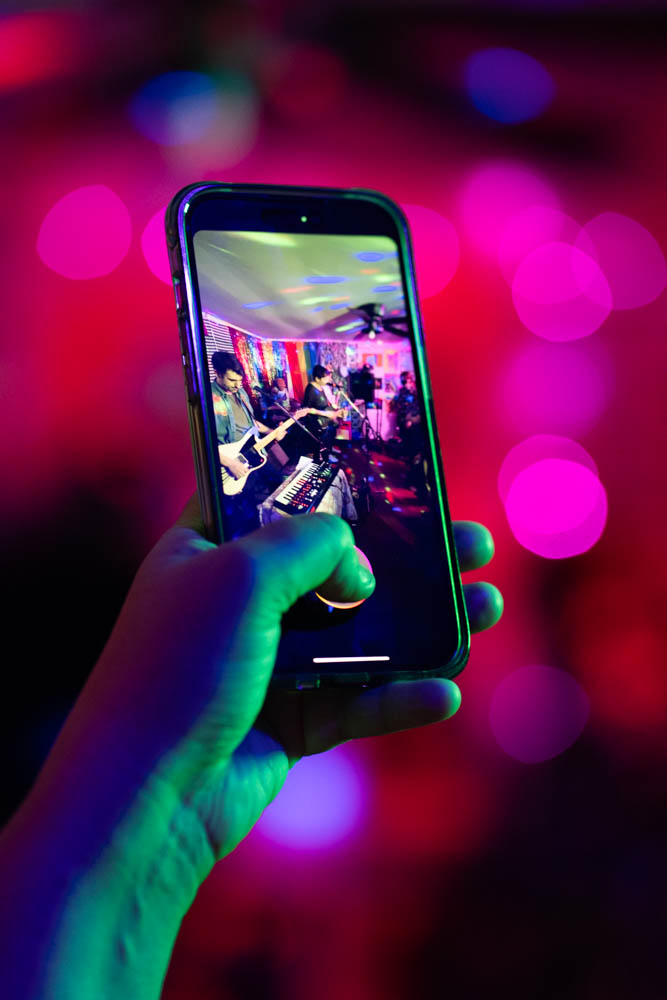
Concert attendee photographs band with her cell phone.

One of the key technical considerations in concert photography is the use of fast shutter speeds. Because concerts are typically low-light environments, a fast shutter speed is necessary to freeze the motion of the performers and prevent blur in the images. This is typically achieved by using a wide aperture, such as f/2.8 or f/4, and a high ISO setting, such as ISO 3200 or higher.

Another important technical aspect of concert photography is the use of off-camera flash. This is because concert venues are often dimly lit, and the use of flash can help to illuminate the performers and create a more dynamic image. Off-camera flash can be achieved using a wireless flash trigger and a separate flash unit, or by using the built-in flash of the camera.

Another important aspect of concert photography is the use of long lenses. This is because concert venues are often large, and a long lens will allow the photographer to zoom in and capture close-up images of the performers. This is especially important for capturing details such as facial expressions and instrument details.

In addition to these technical considerations, concert photography also requires a good understanding of composition and lighting. This is because concert venues are often crowded, and the photographer must be able to navigate the space and position themselves in the best possible location to capture the performance. Additionally, it is important to understand the different lighting setups used in concert venues and how to use them to create interesting and dynamic images.

== Three-song rule & event restrictions ==
Photographers’ access at concerts and live music events is frequently regulated through restrictions that determine where they may stand and how long they may take pictures. These policies are usually set by performers, venues, or event organisers, and they can vary widely depending on the circumstances of the event.

Photographers are often granted entry to a designated area at the front of the stage, commonly referred to as the photo pit or stage pit. The length of time permitted to photographers in the stage pit is generally standardised. Special privileges are granted on rare occasions, typically when the photographer is employed by the performer to capture the entirety of the concert.

In an interview, Chicago music photographer Paul Natkin stated that the rule:

"started in the '80s with bands in New York, especially Springsteen. When a band played in New York, especially places like the Garden, they gave out tons of photo passes. At least half to paparazzi guys. Those people don't know how to photograph, their only option is to put a flash on a camera. A lot of people didn't even know how to change film, they knew they only had 36 shots. They were just doing it for the excitement of doing it. Bruce would go up on stage, and there would be 50 photographers, all shooting flashes in his face. I don't blame him, he walked off stage one night and said, we have to do something about this. Somebody said, why not just let them shoot the first fifteen minutes? Somebody figured out at a normal rock show, a song is about five minutes. Somebody said, let's just let them shoot the first three songs. So it started with him and people in that era. It was also that MTV started around that time, and everybody wanted to look perfect, the way they looked in their videos."

According to a July 21, 2013 popphoto.com article, it could be for appearances; the artist looks best at the beginning of the show.
