= Drunk on Your Love =

Single by Brett Eldredge

from the album Illinois
- Released: November 9, 2015
- Recorded: 2015
- Genre: Country
- Length: 2:54
- Label: Atlantic Nashville
- Songwriters: Brett Eldredge; Ross Copperman
- Producers: Ross Copperman; Brett Eldredge

Brett Eldredge singles chronology
"Lose My Mind" (2015)	"Drunk on Your Love" (2015)	"Wanna Be That Song" (2016)

Music video
- "Drunk on Your Love" on YouTube

"Drunk on Your Love" is a song co-written and recorded by American country music artist Brett Eldredge. It was released on November 9, 2015, as the second single from Eldredge's second studio album, Illinois. Eldredge wrote the song with Ross Copperman.

"Drunk on Your Love" peaked at number 2 on both the Billboard Country Airplay and Hot Country Songs charts, his fifth top 10 hit on both charts respectively. It also gave Eldredge his second top 40 hit on the Hot 100 chart, reaching number 35. The song was certified Gold by the Recording Industry Association of America (RIAA), and has sold 472,000 copies in the United States as of August 2016. It also charted in Canada, giving Eldredge his first number-one hit on the Canada Country chart, and peaking at number 64 on the Canadian Hot 100 chart.

The accompanying music video for the song was directed by Joel Robertson and takes inspiration from the 1996 comedy film Multiplicity.

== History ==
Eldredge originally created the song as a demo, and debuted the song in July 2015 for the wedding of fellow country singer Tyler Hubbard from Florida Georgia Line.

== Critical reception ==
Country music blog Taste of Country reviewed the single favorably, writing that "The idea of being drunk on one’s love is hardly new to the format, but Eldredge’s interpretation is no less sincere for it. The song aims right down the middle of what fans and radio have come to expect from the crooner, and it should easily become another big hit."

== Commercial performance ==
The song first entered the chart at number 54 on the Billboard's Country Airplay chart after its release to radio. It entered the Hot Country Songs chart at No. 41 two weeks later. It peaked at number 2 on both the Hot Country Songs and Country Airplay charts for chart dated April 9, 2016. The song has sold 472,000 copies in the US as of August 2016.

== Music video ==
The music video was directed by Joel Robertson and premiered in January 2016. Shot in Charleston, South Carolina, the video is inspired by the 1996 comedy film Multiplicity with Eldredge playing multiple versions of himself in different occupations, and vying for the attention of the same woman.

== Live performance ==
On September 30, 2016, Eldredge performed the song live on NBC's Today.

== Charts and certifications ==
=== Charts ===
Chart (2015–2016)	Peak position
Canada Hot 100 (Billboard)	64
Canada Country (Billboard)	1
US Billboard Hot 100	35
US Country Airplay (Billboard)	2
US Hot Country Songs (Billboard)	2

=== Year end charts ===
Chart (2016)	Position
US Country Airplay (Billboard)	40
US Hot Country Songs (Billboard)	24

=== Certifications ===
Region	Certification	Certified units/sales
Canada (Music Canada)	Platinum	80,000^{‡}
United States (RIAA)	Platinum	1,000,000^{‡} / 472,000
^{‡} Sales+streaming figures based on certification alone.
