= Illinois (Brett Eldredge album) =

Album by Brett Eldredge

Studio album by Brett Eldredge
- Released: September 11, 2015
- Genre: Country
- Label: Atlantic Nashville
- Producer: Ross Copperman (tracks 1–6, 8, 9, 11, 12); Brad Crisler (tracks 7, 10); Brett Eldredge (all tracks)

Brett Eldredge chronology
Bring You Back (2013)	Illinois (2015)	Glow (2016)

Singles from Illinois
- 1. "Lose My Mind" Released: May 4, 2015; 2. "Drunk on Your Love" Released: November 9, 2015; 3. "Wanna Be That Song" Released: May 23, 2016

Illinois is the second studio album by American country music artist Brett Eldredge. It was released on September 11, 2015, via Atlantic Records Nashville. Its lead single, "Lose My Mind", was released to country radio on May 4, 2015. The album's second single, "Drunk on Your Love" was released to country radio on November 9, 2015. The album's third single, "Wanna Be That Song" released to country radio on May 23, 2016. Eldredge co-wrote every song, and produced the album with Ross Copperman and Brad Crisler.

== Critical reception ==
Giving it 4 out of 5 stars, Stephen Thomas Erlewine praised the album's R&B influences, saying that "Such soulfulness and sly stylistic diversity were largely absent on Bring You Back, a quite pleasing set of by-the-books radio country, and it certainly enlivens Illinois, but not at the expense of strong songs."

== Commercial performance ==
Illinois entered the US Billboard 200 chart at number 3, selling 51,000 equivalent units in the week ending September 17 (including 44,000 traditional album sales). This marks the largest-selling week for an album in Eldredge's career, passing Bring You Back (2013), which sold 21,000 units in the first week on chart. In the second week it sold an additional 9,500 copies. As of January 2017, the album has sold 175,800 copies domestically.

== Track listing ==
No.	Title	Writer(s)	Length
1.	"Fire"	Brett Eldredge; Ross Copperman; Jon Nite	3:18
2.	"You Can't Stop Me" (featuring Thomas Rhett)	Eldredge; Copperman; Heather Morgan	3:24
3.	"Lose My Mind"	Eldredge; Copperman; Morgan; Brian Burton; Thomas Callaway; Gian Franco Reverberi; Gian Piero Reverberi	2:36
4.	"Wanna Be That Song"	Eldredge; Copperman; Scooter Carusoe	3:56
5.	"Time Well Spent"	Eldredge; Carusoe; Chris DeStefano	3:36
6.	"If You Were My Girl"	Eldredge; Copperman; Nite	3:33
7.	"Illinois"	Eldredge; Brad Crisler; Tom Douglas	3:22
8.	"Just a Taste"	Eldredge; Copperman; Morgan	3:29
9.	"Drunk on Your Love"	Eldredge; Copperman	2:54
10.	"Lose It All"	Eldredge; Crisler; Bill Anderson	3:41
11.	"Shadow"	Eldredge; Copperman; Morgan	2:41
12.	"Going Away for Awhile"	Eldredge; Copperman; Morgan	3:13

== Personnel ==
- Stephanie Chapman - background vocals (track 4)
- Ross Copperman - acoustic guitar, electric guitar, keyboards (track 9), programming, background vocals
- Brad Crisler - bass guitar (track 10), acoustic guitar (track 10), electric guitar (track 10), keyboards (track 10), percussion (track 10), piano (tracks 7, 10), programming (tracks 7, 10), background vocals (tracks 7, 10)
- Dan Dugmore - pedal steel guitar
- Brett Eldredge - lead vocals, background vocals, mouth percussion (track 11)
- Fred Eltringham - drums, percussion
- Josh Haselton - drums (track 10)
- Mike Johnson - pedal steel guitar (track 7)
- Troy Lancaster - electric guitar (track 7)
- James LeBlanc - electric guitar (track 10)
- Jason Lehning - keyboards
- Tony Lucido - bass guitar
- Heather Morgan - background vocals (track 8)
- Jon Nite - background vocals (track 6)
- Danny Rader - acoustic guitar (track 7)
- Seth Rausch - drums (track 7)
- Thomas Rhett - duet vocals (track 2)
- Jimmie Lee Sloas - bass guitar (track 7)
- Aaron Sterling - drums (track 9), percussion (track 9)
- Jason Webb - synthesizer (track 7)
- Derek Wells - acoustic guitar, electric guitar, mandolin (tracks 3, 6)
- Micah Willshire - background vocals (tracks 2, 9)

== Charts ==
=== Weekly charts ===
Chart (2015)	Peak position
Canadian Albums (Billboard)	10
US Billboard 200	3
US Top Country Albums (Billboard)	1

=== Year-end charts ===
Chart (2015)	Position
US Top Country Albums (Billboard)	41
Chart (2016)	Position
US Billboard 200	181
US Top Country Albums (Billboard)	33
Chart (2017)	Position
US Top Country Albums (Billboard)	91

=== Singles ===
Year	Single	Peak chart positions					Sales
Year	Single	US Hot Country	US Country Airplay	US	CAN Country	CAN	Sales
2015	"Lose My Mind"	2	1	48	2	57	US: 506,000
2015	"Drunk on Your Love"	2	2	35	1	64	US: 414,000
2016	"Wanna Be That Song"	3	1	46	1	97	
