= Wanna Be That Song =

Single by Brett Eldredge

from the album Illinois
- Released: May 23, 2016
- Genre: Country
- Length: 3:56
- Label: Atlantic Nashville
- Songwriters: Brett Eldredge; Ross Copperman; Scooter Carusoe
- Producers: Ross Copperman; Brett Eldredge

Brett Eldredge singles chronology
"Drunk on Your Love" (2015)	"Wanna Be That Song" (2016)	"Somethin' I'm Good At" (2017)

"Wanna Be That Song" is a song co-written and recorded by American country music artist Brett Eldredge. It was released on May 23, 2016, as the third and final single from Eldredge's second studio album, Illinois. Eldredge wrote the song with Ross Copperman and Scooter Carusoe.

== Background ==
According to Eldredge, the idea for the song came when he was about to walk on stage to perform at the Kansas Speedway, and he said to songwriter Scooter Carusoe: "I want to write a song called "Wanna Be That Song"." However, the song was not written until three months later in a writing session with Carusoe and Ross Copperman, who is the producer of his album. Eldredge said of the song: ""Wanna Be That Song" has everything I want to say about love and about what I'm trying to be."

== Commercial performance ==
The song first entered the chart when the song became available for download as a preview single in advance of the release of the album Illinois. Based on 16,000 copies in sales, the song debuted at No. 34 on Hot Country Songs for chart dated September 26, 2015. When the song was released to radio as the third single from the album in 2016; the song debuted on Country Airplay at No. 58 for chart dated June 4, 2016; It also debuted at number 57 on the US Billboard Hot 100 chart. The song peaked at No. 3 on Hot Country Songs, and reached No. 1 on the Country Airplay chart in December 2016, making this Eldredge's fifth No. 1 on the chart. The song has sold 410,000 copies as of August 2017. The song also reached at number 25 on Canada Country chart for the week of November 25, 2016.

== Music video ==
The music video was directed by Trey Fanjoy and premiered in June 2016. It was filmed in Wrigley Field.

== Charts ==
=== Weekly charts ===
Chart (2016–2017)	Peak position
Canada Hot 100 (Billboard)	64
Canada Country (Billboard)	1
US Billboard Hot 100	46
US Country Airplay (Billboard)	1
US Hot Country Songs (Billboard)	3

=== Year-end charts ===
Chart (2016)	Position
US Hot Country Songs (Billboard)	55

Chart (2017)	Position
Canada Country (Billboard)	45
US Country Airplay (Billboard)	50
US Hot Country Songs (Billboard)	62
US Radio Songs (Billboard)	74

== Certifications ==
Region	Certification	Certified units/sales
Canada (Music Canada)	Gold	40,000^{‡}
United States (RIAA)	Platinum	1,000,000^{‡} / 410,000
^{‡} Sales+streaming figures based on certification alone.
