= Beat of the Music =

Single by Brett Eldredge

from the album Bring You Back
- Released: September 30, 2013
- Genre: Country
- Length: 2:59
- Label: Atlantic Nashville
- Songwriters: Brett Eldredge; Ross Copperman; Heather Morgan
- Producers: Brett Eldredge; Ross Copperman

Brett Eldredge singles chronology
"Don't Ya" (2012)	"Beat of the Music" (2013)	"Mean to Me" (2014)

"Beat of the Music" is a song recorded by American country music artist Brett Eldredge. It was released on September 30, 2013 as his fourth single and the third single from his debut studio album, Bring You Back (2013). Eldredge co-wrote the song with Ross Copperman and Heather Morgan. It received mixed reviews from critics who questioned the familiarity in the production and lyricism. "Beat of the Music" gave Eldredge his second consecutive number one hit on the Billboard Country Airplay chart. It also peaked at numbers six and 44 on both the Hot Country Songs and Hot 100 charts respectively. The song was certified Platinum by the Recording Industry Association of America (RIAA), and has sold 510,000 copies in the United States as of July 2014. It achieved similar chart prominence in Canada, reaching number two on the Canada Country chart and number 58 on the Canadian Hot 100 chart. The accompanying music video for the song was directed by Shane Drake, and was filmed in Staniel Cay in the Bahamas.

== Critical reception ==
"Beat of the Music" garnered mixed reviews from music critics. An uncredited review from Taste of Country said that "it relies on a chorus that sinks in like a good second glass of wine, complementing just about anything on the radio currently." The review went on to say that "Eldredge holds back some vocally, relying instead on hooky choruses and a charming singing personality" and "the production team take few risks in creating a pleasing sonic backdrop for the singer to tell this story." In his review of the album, Dan MacIntosh of Roughstock called the song "dull" and "generic," writing that "it's the sort of lyric that only seems to make sense in romantic comedy movies, but rarely rings true in real life. It's a familiar, overused plot that just doesn’t resonate as reality."

Markos Papadatos of Digital Journal gave the song an A rating, calling the vocals "flawless" and writing that "this new song is infectious and as soon as it's over, the listeners will instantly want to press the 'repeat' button on their CD and mp3 players. It will inspire his fans to get up and dance along to it."

== Music video ==
The music video was directed by Shane Drake and premiered in January 2014. It was filmed in Staniel Cay in the Bahamas, and features Miami-based actress Katie Luddy.

== Chart performance ==
"Beat of the Music" debuted at number 60 on the Billboard Country Airplay chart for the week of October 12, 2013. It also debuted at number 46 on the Hot Country Songs chart for the week of November 23. On the Billboard Hot 100, it debuted at number 97 the week of February 22, 2014. Seventeen weeks later, it peaked at number 44 the week of June 21, and stayed on the chart for twenty weeks. "Beat of the Music" reached number one on the Country Airplay chart dated June 28, 2014, becoming Eldredge's second consecutive single to do so. It was certified platinum by the Recording Industry Association of America (RIAA) on December 9, 2016. The song has sold 510,000 copies in the U.S. as of July 2014.

In Canada, the track debuted at number 81 on the Canadian Hot 100 for the week of April 19, 2014. Nine weeks later, it peaked at number 58 the week of June 21, and remained on the chart for fifteen weeks.

Chart (2013–2014)	Peak position
Canada Hot 100 (Billboard)	58
Canada Country (Billboard)	2
US Billboard Hot 100	44
US Country Airplay (Billboard)	1
US Hot Country Songs (Billboard)	6

=== Year-end charts ===
Chart (2014)	Position
US Country Airplay (Billboard)	1
US Hot Country Songs (Billboard)	23

== Certifications ==
Region	Certification	Certified units/sales
United States (RIAA)	Platinum	1,000,000^{‡} / 510,000
