= Bring You Back =

Studio album by Brett Eldredge
- Released: August 6, 2013
- Genre: Country
- Label: Atlantic Records
- Producers: Ross Copperman; Brad Crisler; Chris DeStefano; Brett Eldredge; Byron Gallimore; Scott Hendricks; Luke Laird

Brett Eldredge chronology
Bring You Back (2013)	Illinois (2015)

Singles from Bring You Back
- 1. "Raymond" Released: September 27, 2010; 2. "Don't Ya" Released: October 8, 2012; 3. "Beat of the Music" Released: September 30, 2013; 4. "Mean to Me" Released: July 14, 2014

Bring You Back is the debut album by American country music artist Brett Eldredge. It was released on August 6, 2013, by Atlantic Records. The album was originally titled One Way Ticket, and was to include Eldredge's second single "It Ain't Gotta Be Love". However, the album was renamed before release and "It Ain't Gotta Be Love" was scrapped from the final track listing. The album includes the singles "Raymond", "Don't Ya", "Beat of the Music" and "Mean to Me", the latter three of which all reached number one on the Billboard Country Airplay chart. The album has gained critical acclaim by music critics.

== Songs ==
Brett Eldredge stated that the last song "Go On Without Me" was written in memoriam about Lindsay Nicole Walleman, the Manager of Midwest/Northeast Promotions, W.A.R. Team at Warner Music Nashville, after she died of cancer in 2013. In addition, Eldredge noted that Walleman was "'one of the people who were fighting for me to get on the radio'", and he told that "'When the label heard this song, they agreed that we were finishing the album with it.'"

On August 17, 2023, Eldredge released the ten year edition of the album featuring a bonus track called "Adios Old Friend".

== Critical reception ==
Professional ratings
Review scores
Source	Rating
AllMusic	3.5/5 stars
Country Weekly	B+
Digital Journal	5/5 stars
Got Country Online	5/5 stars
Roughstock	4/5 stars
Taste of Country	3.5/5 stars

Bring You Back garnered critical acclaim from the six music critics to review the album. At Allmusic, Stephen Thomas Erlewine highlighted that the release is "crisp, chipper, and eager to please, an album that cheerfully checks off every box on contemporary country radio." In addition, Erlewine noted that "everything" contained on the effort "is shiny, happy country-pop -- even the ballads feel bright -- but that's the appeal of Eldredge and his debut: everybody involved worked hard to deliver a piece of gleaming modern country product, and it's hard to resist all that impeccable craft." Giving it a "B+", Bob Paxman of Country Weekly described Eldredge's voice as "soulful", comparing his delivery on "Waited Too Long" and the title track favorably to Travis Tritt. He wrote that some of the songs "travel down the often-trod pavement of small-town odes[…]But never do they sound contrived or overly sentimental". However, he called "On and On" and "Beat of the Music" "ordinary".

Markos Papadatos of Digital Journal told that everyone of the "songs on here are flawless and they each have their own identities", which they are " not overdone or overproduced", and the tracks are "well-written and sung from the heart." Additionally, Papadatos stated that "if a baseball analogy were used to describe the excellence of this album, it is safe to say that Brett has hit a grand slam with 'Bring You Back.'" Got Country Online's Donna Block noted that "just as his music covers many genres, the songs on his album will touch a wide range of emotions." At Roughstock, Dan MacIntosh felt that "maybe it's this album's overall sonic warmth that makes it feel undeniably Country, even without many of the more obvious aural clues." Billy Dukes of Taste of Country found that "the pace is exhilarating, but also worth noting are the subtle warbles and variations in his voice that make each song on 'Bring You Back' a unique moment."

== Track listing ==
No.	Title	Writer(s)	Producer	Length
1.	"Tell Me Where to Park"	Brett Eldredge; Jon Nite; Greg Becker	Luke Laird	2:57
2.	"Don't Ya"	Eldredge; Chris DeStefano; Ashley Gorley	DeStefano	3:01
3.	"Bring You Back"	Ross Copperman; Heather Morgan	Copperman	3:12
4.	"On and On"	Eldredge; Laird; Shane McAnally	Laird	3:08
5.	"Gotta Get There"	Eldredge; Laird; Barry Dean	Laird	3:23
6.	"One Mississippi"	Eldredge; Tom Douglas	Scott Hendricks	3:45
7.	"Beat of the Music"	Eldredge; Copperman; Morgan	Elderedge; Copperman	2:59
8.	"Waited Too Long"	Eldredge; Brad Crisler	Brad Crisler	3:59
9.	"Mean to Me"	Eldredge; Scooter Carusoe	Laird	3:48
10.	"Signs"	Eldredge; Crisler; Bill Anderson	Byron Gallimore	3:53
11.	"Raymond"	Eldredge; Crisler	Gallimore	3:39
12.	"Go On Without Me"	Eldredge; Copperman; Natalie Hemby	Eldredge; Copperman	3:16

10-Year Anniversary Edition
No.	Title	Writer(s)	Producer	Length
13.	"One Mississippi - Live from CMT's Listen Up"	Eldredge; Douglas	Mark Hall	4:11
14.	"Adios Old Friend - 10-Year Anniversary Bonus Track"	Eldredge; Jon Randall		4:17

== Personnel ==
- Walt Aldridge – acoustic guitar (track 8)
- Steve Brewster – drums (track 3)
- Mike Brignardello – bass guitar (tracks 10, 11)
- Stephanie Chapman – background vocals (tracks 7, 12)
- Perry Coleman – background vocals (tracks 1, 9)
- Ross Copperman – accordion (tracks 7, 12), acoustic guitar (tracks 7, 12), electric guitar (tracks 7, 12), mandolin (tracks 7, 12), programming (tracks 7, 12)
- Brad Crisler – Hammond B-3 organ (track 8), piano (track 8)
- Chris DeStefano – bass guitar (track 2), drums (track 2), fiddle (track 2), banjitar (track 2), acoustic guitar (track 2), electric guitar (track 2) mandolin (track 2), background vocals (track 2)
- Dan Dugmore – acoustic guitar (tracks 7, 12), electric guitar (tracks 7, 12), pedal steel guitar (tracks 2, 3, 7, 8, 11, 12)
- Stuart Duncan – fiddle (track 10)
- Mike Durham – acoustic guitar (tracks 1, 9), electric guitar (tracks 1, 4, 5, 9)
- Brett Eldredge – lead vocals (all tracks), background vocals (tracks 1, 4, 5, 9)
- Fred Eltringham – drums (tracks 7, 12)
- Shawn Fichter – drums (tracks 1, 4, 5, 9)
- Shannon Forrest – drums (tracks 10, 11)
- Paul Franklin – pedal steel guitar (track 10)
- Byron Gallimore – electric guitar (track 11)
- Tommy Harden – drums (track 8)
- Tony Harrell – Hammond B-3 organ (track 10), piano (track 10)
- Natalie Hemby – background vocals (tracks 6, 7, 12)
- Wes Hightower – background vocals (tracks 10, 11)
- Mark Hill – bass guitar (track 3)
- Charlie Judge – keyboards (tracks 4, 5), piano (track 6), synthesizer strings (track 6)
- Jeff King – electric guitar (track 3)
- Luke Laird – acoustic guitar (tracks 1, 4, 5, 9), electric guitar (track 4)
- Troy Lancaster – electric guitar (track 8)
- Jason Lehning – electric guitar (tracks 7, 12), Hammond B-3 organ (tracks 7, 12), piano (tracks 7, 12), synthesizer (tracks 7, 12)
- Rachel Loy – bass guitar (tracks 1, 4, 5, 9)
- Tony Lucido – bass guitar (tracks 7, 12)
- Chris McHugh – percussion (track 6)
- Brent Mason – electric guitar (tracks 10, 11)
- Heather Morgan – background vocals (track 3)
- Craig Nelson – bass guitar (track 6)
- Jimmy Nichols – piano (track 11), synthesizer strings (track 11)
- Josh Osborne – acoustic guitar (tracks 7, 12), electric guitar (tracks 7, 12), mandolin (tracks 7, 12)
- Russ Pahl – pedal steel guitar (tracks 1, 6, 9)
- Alison Prestwood – bass guitar (track 8)
- Matt Stanfield – keyboards (tracks 1, 9)
- Bryan Sutton – acoustic guitar (tracks 10, 11)
- Ilya Toshinsky – acoustic guitar (track 5), gut string guitar (track 6)
- Jason Webb – keyboards (track 3)
- Lee Ann Womack — background vocals (track 14)

== Chart positions ==
The album debuted at No. 11 on the Billboard 200 and No. 2 on the Top Country Albums chart, with 21,000 copies sold in the U.S. in its debut week. It was the best start by a new male artist on Top Country Albums in nearly a year. The album has sold 183,000 copies in the U.S. as of June 2015.

=== Weekly charts ===
Chart (2013–15)	Peak position
US Billboard 200	11
US Top Country Albums (Billboard)	2

=== Year-end charts ===
Chart (2013)	Position
US Top Country Albums (Billboard)	62
Chart (2014)	Position
US Top Country Albums (Billboard)	74
Chart (2015)	Position
US Top Country Albums (Billboard)	63

=== Singles ===
Year	Single	Peak chart positions				
Year	Single	US Country	US Country Airplay	US	CAN Country	CAN
2010	"Raymond"	23	—	—	—	—
2012	"Don't Ya"	5	1	30	3	51
2013	"Beat of the Music"	6	1	44	2	58
2014	"Mean to Me"	4	1	53	3	65
"—" denotes releases that did not chart

== Certifications ==
Region	Certification	Certified units/sales
United States (RIAA)	Gold	500,000^{^}
^{^} Shipments figures based on certification alone.
