= Welcome to Reality (album) =

Studio album by Ross Copperman
- Released: May 28, 2007
- Genre: Pop rock
- Length: 55:35
- Label: RCA/Phonogenic

Ross Copperman chronology
Believe (2003)	Welcome to Reality (2007)	This Is Ross Copperman (2009)

Welcome to Reality is the second album by American singer-songwriter Ross Copperman, and first on a major label. The singles released from the album were "As I Choke", "All She Wrote", and "Found You". Released in May 2007, the album reached the charts in Scotland and the United Kingdom.

== Critical reception ==
Allmusic's Sharon Mawer remarked that the album's commercial prospects suffered as the label appeared to favor "their reality TV produced singers than with a genuine rock singer/songwriter, especially one who sounded so much like many other major stars." In a negative review, Dave Simpson of The Guardian wrote that the album consisted of "lowest-common-denominator songs could have been put together in a laboratory." Nick Mitchell of The Skinny said that when listening to the songs on the album as a whole, "they all become one and the same: sickly, insipid twaddle that couldn't be fixed by all the session guitarists in the world."

== Track listing ==
1. All She Wrote
2. Found You
3. Guilty Pleasure
4. Fly Away
5. As I Choke
6. I Get By
7. Can’t Stop Loving You
8. Believe
9. I Don’t Wanna Let You Go
10. Lucky Day
11. Get Away
12. Shout
13. They’ll Never Know
14. To Be (Hidden Track)

== Charts ==
Chart (2007)	Peak position
Scottish Albums Chart (Official Charts Company)	63
UK Albums Chart (Official Charts Company)	59
