= Mean to Me (Brett Eldredge song) =

Single by Brett Eldredge

from the album Bring You Back
- Released: July 14, 2014
- Genre: Country
- Length: 3:48
- Label: Atlantic Nashville
- Songwriter(s): Brett Eldredge; Scooter Carusoe
- Producer(s): Luke Laird

Brett Eldredge singles chronology
| "Beat of the Music" (2013) | "Mean to Me" (2014) | "Lose My Mind" (2015) |

Alternative cover

"Mean to Me" is a song co-written and recorded by American country music artist Brett Eldredge. It was released on July 14, 2014, as his fifth single and the fourth single from his debut studio album, Bring You Back. The song was written by Eldredge and Scooter Carusoe.

The song has sold 477,000 copies in the US as of April 2015.

== Critical reception ==
The website Taste of Country gave the song a positive review, saying that "In a way, ‘Mean to Me’ is Eldredge's answer to a test brought to him after two successful, but sonically similar songs. He needed to go in a different direction or risk boring his fans, and he did. This beautiful ballad makes him all the more interesting."

== Music video ==
The music video was directed by Shane Drake and premiered in September 2014.

== Charts ==
=== Weekly charts ===
| Chart (2014–2015) | Peak position |
|---|---|
| Canada (Canadian Hot 100) | 65 |
| Canada Country (Billboard) | 3 |
| US Billboard Hot 100 | 53 |
| US Country Airplay (Billboard) | 1 |
| US Hot Country Songs (Billboard) | 4 |

=== Year-end charts ===
| Chart (2014) | Position |
|---|---|
| US Country Airplay (Billboard) | 91 |
| US Hot Country Songs (Billboard) | 92 |

| Chart (2015) | Position |
|---|---|
| US Country Airplay (Billboard) | 19 |
| US Hot Country Songs (Billboard) | 50 |

== Certifications ==
| Region | Certification | Certified units/sales |
|---|---|---|
| United States (RIAA) | Platinum | 1,000,000^{‡} |
^{‡} Sales+streaming figures based on certification alone.
