= Don't Ya =

Single by Brett Eldredge

from the album Bring You Back
- Released: October 8, 2012
- Genre: Country
- Length: 3:01
- Label: Atlantic Nashville
- Songwriters: Brett Eldredge; Chris DeStefano; Ashley Gorley
- Producer: Chris DeStefano

Brett Eldredge singles chronology
| "It Ain't Gotta Be Love" (2011) | "Don't Ya" (2012) | "Beat of the Music" (2013) |

"Don't Ya" is a song co-written and recorded by American country music artist Brett Eldredge. It was released on October 8, 2012, as the second single from his debut studio album Bring You Back (2013). Eldredge co-wrote the song with Chris DeStefano and Ashley Gorley, and is about a man going after a beautiful woman. It received positive reviews from critics, who praised the believable love story and vocal delivery. "Don't Ya" gave Eldredge the first of four consecutive number-one hits on the Billboard Country Airplay chart. It also peaked at numbers five and 30 on both the Hot Country Songs and Hot 100 charts respectively. The song was certified Platinum by the Recording Industry Association of America (RIAA), and has sold 1,039,000 units as of February 2015. It achieved similar chart prominence in Canada, reaching number three on the Canada Country chart and number 51 on the Canadian Hot 100 chart. It garnered a Gold certification from Music Canada, denoting sales of over 40,000 units in that country. An accompanying music video for the song, directed by Mason Dixon, features Eldredge being smitten by a girl at a house party.

== Content ==
The song is about a male making advances on an attractive female. It is in the key of E major with a moderate tempo, and a vocal range of B3-G♯5.

== Critical reception ==
Billy Dukes of Taste of Country gave the song four and a half stars out of five, writing that "Eldredge builds the tension in the room without relying on overly dramatic instrumentation or animated imagery. His story is believable, but still detailed enough to fill in gaps in color and personality. The melody leads to a great hook in a chorus that never verges on gimmicky." Kyle Ward of Roughstock gave the song a favorable review, saying that "The soul influences are a new direction for Eldredge, but he nails them with a charming and seductive vocal in the style of James Otto."

== Commercial performance ==
"Don't Ya" debuted at number 58 on the Billboard Country Airplay chart and number 46 on the Hot Country Songs chart for the week of October 27, 2012. On the week of June 8, 2013, the song debuted at number 95 on the Billboard Hot 100. It peaked at number 30 on the week of August 24 and stayed on the chart for twenty weeks. The song was certified platinum by the RIAA in the US on September 4, 2014. As of February 2015, it has sold 1,039,000 copies in the United States.

In Canada, the track debuted at number 90 on the Canadian Hot 100 for the week of August 3, 2013. Three weeks later, it reached number 51 on the week of August 24, remaining on the chart for thirteen weeks. On October 10, "Don't Ya" was certified Gold by Music Canada.

== Music video ==
The music video was directed by Mason Dixon and premiered in March 2013. The video takes place in a crowded house party that Eldredge is attending as he sees an attractive girl who has him following her throughout the party. It ends with both of them alone in a bedroom and kissing each other. Intercut are shots of Eldredge performing at said party.

== Charts and certifications ==
=== Peak positions ===
| Chart (2012–2013) | Peak position |
|---|---|
| Canada Hot 100 (Billboard) | 51 |
| Canada Country (Billboard) | 3 |
| US Billboard Hot 100 | 30 |
| US Country Airplay (Billboard) | 1 |
| US Hot Country Songs (Billboard) | 5 |

=== Year-end charts ===
| Chart (2013) | Position |
|---|---|
| US Country Airplay (Billboard) | 4 |
| US Hot Country Songs (Billboard) | 20 |
| US Radio Songs (Billboard) | 68 |

=== Certifications ===
| Region | Certification | Certified units/sales |
|---|---|---|
| Canada (Music Canada) | Gold | 40,000^{*} |
| United States (RIAA) | Platinum | 1,039,000 |
^{*} Sales figures based on certification alone.
