= University Press (Lamar University) =

Student newspaper at Lamar University, Texas

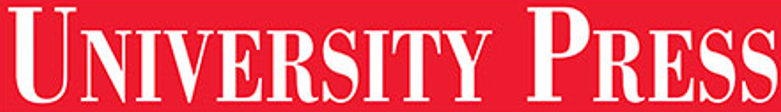

- The September 29, 2022, issue
- Type: Student newspaper
- School: Lamar University
- Headquarters: Beaumont, Texas
- Website: lamaruniversitypress.com

The University Press, also commonly referred to as the UP, is the student-run newspaper of Lamar University in Beaumont, Texas, United States. The student newspaper gained the name University Press in 1971.

== History ==
When South Park Junior College, now Lamar University, began in 1923, a Student Publications Board was appointed to study the need for a student newspaper. The committee decided that, indeed, the school needed a newspaper. The committee and the student body came up with the contraction for South Park and the word “Plug” to indicate action — hence, The S’Park Plug. Elery Holland was named the first editor. The staff managed to publish four issues for 1923–24. E.C. Brodie, an English professor, served as the first faculty adviser.

During the Flapper era and before the collapse of the Stock Market on October 28 and 29, 1929, student publications flourished. But during the 1930s, money was hard to come by. The newspaper did manage to keep going, but staffs were not able to bring out issues on a regular basis. Much later, during World War II, newsprint and staffing were not available, so the newspaper suspended publication for what Americans called “The Duration.”

In 1946, however, the Depression and World War II were over, and Student Publications got back to normal. The S’Park Plug, which had become The Redbird when South Park College became Lamar College in 1932, started publishing an edition every other week. These changes were made to try to establish a separate identity for the college from the South Park school district, which had been its parent.

By the mid-1950s, The Redbird was publishing weekly.

When Lamar gained university status in 1971, the student body voted to change the name of the newspaper to the University Press to give the newspaper an identity correlating with the school's new status.

By the early 1970s, lack of finances were back in the picture. The Cardinal, a very expensive operation and separate from the University Press, had had a series of disastrous years in sales and staffing. Students were no longer willing to work on it and they were no longer willing to buy it. The university put some of its best talent into managing the publication and many editions were award winners. But when the staff got down to two students and only 27 students purchased it, the writing was on the wall. The 1975 edition was the last.

The University Press inherited a part of the yearbook budget, and, for the first time, in 1976–77, began publishing twice weekly — every Wednesday and Friday.

From 1976 until 1985, the University Press published a slick magazine, also named Cardinal. The publication won every award given to magazines by the Southwestern Journalism Congress and the Texas Intercollegiate Press Association, including sweepstakes (highest points scored by any magazine) for six of its nine years in existence. Again, in 1985, a financial crunch hit the Golden Triangle owing to falling oil prices and Student Publications cut costs by canceling the expensive slick. Later, a newspaper magazine called UPBeat was started as a supplement, more in keeping with today's trends.

Although the name “S’Park Plug” died many years ago, it remains apropos in describing the tradition that students since Elery Holland, that first editor, have continued in making the UP something of which the university is quite proud.

== Awards & Acclaim ==
The University Press has grown into one of Lamar's showpieces. It is the largest student-run business on campus, and it has become one of the most respected student newspapers in the country. Since 1977, the University Press and its magazines have garnered more than 1200 awards, including first place for Best Non-Daily Student Newspaper in 1994 and 2005 from The Associated Press Managing Editors of Texas and second place from the same group in 1988, 1997, 2001, 2002, 2003 and 2004. The UP has averaged more than 38 awards a year in those 29 years.

The University Press is also well-equipped, with one of the largest Apple computer systems in Southeast Texas.

The University Press won second place in the non daily student paper category in 2011.

The UP is a member of the Texas Intercollegiate Press Association and the Press Club of Southeast Texas.

== Staff & Students ==
Howard Perkins, director of student publications from September 1976 to 2011, served five terms as president of the Southwestern Journalism Congress. He is the only person in journalism education that was recognized with a special scholarship named in his honor by the organization. He has also served as president, vice president, scholarship chairman, and adviser-of-the-year chairman for the Texas Intercollegiate Press Association. He was elected Adviser-of-the-Year by that organization in 1979 — a lifetime award. Andy Coughlan serves as the current director, and Stephan Malick serves as assistant director and advertising manager.
