= It Ain't Gotta Be Love =

Single by Brett Eldredge
- Released: June 28, 2011
- Genre: Country
- Length: 3:06
- Label: Atlantic Nashville
- Songwriters: Brett Eldredge; Wayd Battle; Ben Daniel
- Producer: Byron Gallimore

Brett Eldredge singles chronology
"Raymond" (2010)	"It Ain't Gotta Be Love" (2011)	"Don't Ya" (2012)

"It Ain't Gotta Be Love" is a song co-written and recorded by American country music artist Brett Eldredge. It was released on June 28, 2011 as his second single, but was never included on a studio album. Eldredge wrote the song with Wayd Battle and Ben Daniel. Sometime in 2015, the song was pulled from all music download sites, and is no longer available for download.

== Critical reception ==
Billy Dukes of Taste of Country gave the song a three-star review, saying that "Ultimately, Eldredge succeeds at proving he’s a man of varying emotions, but ‘It Ain’t Gotta’ Be Love’ doesn’t resonate as well as ‘Raymond’ (or any other hit song) does. It’s easy to listen to, and even enjoyable, but it fails to stick between the folds of the brain like great songs do. Instead it sort of rattles around in the ear drum for awhile, before falling out in one’s sleep."

== Chart positions ==
Chart (2011)	Peak position
US Hot Country Songs (Billboard)	46
