= Brett Eldredge =

American country singer-songwriter and producer (born 1986)

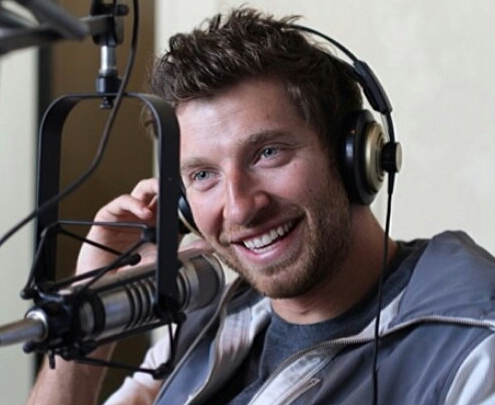
- Eldredge in 2014

Background information
- Born: Brett Ryan Eldredge; March 23, 1986 (age 40)
- Origin: Paris, Illinois, United States
- Genres: Country
- Occupations: Singer; songwriter; record producer
- Instruments: Vocals; guitar
- Years active: 2010–present
- Label: Warner Music Nashville

Brett Ryan Eldredge (born March 23, 1986) is an American country music singer, songwriter and record producer. Eldredge has had five No. 1 singles on the Billboard Country Airplay chart, three of which came from his debut album, Bring You Back: "Don't Ya", "Beat of the Music", and "Mean to Me".

== Early life ==
Eldredge was born on March 23, 1986, in Paris, Illinois, to Robin Beth (née Vonderlage) and Christopher "Chris" Eldredge. He has an older brother, Brice. He studied at Elmhurst College in Elmhurst, Illinois. His cousin, Terry Eldredge, is a former member of the Grascals.

== Career ==
=== Bring You Back (2010–2014) ===
Eldredge co-wrote the track "I Think I've Had Enough" for Gary Allan, who recorded it for his eighth studio album, Get Off on the Pain. By late 2010, he had signed to Atlantic Records and released his debut single, "Raymond" on September 27, 2010. It debuted at number 52 on the US Billboard Hot Country Songs chart dated for the week ending October 16, 2010 and reached a peak of number 23. "It Ain't Gotta Be Love" was released as his second single and reached number 46. Eldredge performed on the Grand Ole Opry on October 29, 2010.

A third single, "Don't Ya", was released to country radio in October 2012. It became his first single to reach the top 20 of the Hot Country Songs chart and his first to appear on the Billboard Hot 100. His debut studio album, Bring You Back, was released on August 6, 2013. "Don't Ya" reached number one on the Country Airplay chart the same month. The album's second single, "Beat of the Music", also reached number one on the same chart. The album's third single, "Mean to Me", was released to country radio on July 14, 2014. It reached number one on the Country Airplay chart in March 2015. On August 17, 2023, Eldredge released the ten year edition of the album featuring a bonus track called "Adios Old Friend".

=== Illinois and Glow (2015–2016) ===
Eldredge's sixth single overall, "Lose My Mind", was released in 2015. It is the lead single to his second studio album, Illinois. It reached number one on the Country Airplay chart in October 2015. The album's second single, "Drunk on Your Love" released to country radio on November 9, 2015. It reached at number two on the Country Airplay chart in April 2016. The album's third single, "Wanna Be That Song" released to country radio on May 23, 2016. It reached at number one on the Country Airplay in January 2017. He was one of the opening acts on Taylor Swift's Red Tour. On Memorial Day 2015, he sang "Take Me Out to The Ballgame" during the seventh Inning Stretch at Wrigley Field while the Cubs played host to the Washington Nationals.

In 2016, Eldredge was selected as one of 30 artists to perform on "Forever Country", a mash-up track of Take Me Home, Country Roads; On the Road Again; and I Will Always Love You which celebrates 50 years of the CMA Awards.

Eldredge released his first Christmas album, Glow, in October 2016.

=== Self-titled album (2017–2019) ===
In March 2017, he released "Somethin' I'm Good At", the lead single to his self titled fourth studio album. The album's second single, "The Long Way" released to country radio on August 21, 2017, and peaked at number three. The album's third single was "Love Someone".

=== Sunday Drive and Songs About You (2020–2022) ===
On April 17, 2020, Eldredge released the single "Gabrielle", the lead single off his fifth studio album Sunday Drive, released on July 10, 2020.

On April 22, 2022, Eldredge released the single "Songs About You", the lead single from the album of the same name; the album was released on June 17, 2022.

=== Merry Christmas (Welcome to the Family), label departure and Lonestar Lovers (2024–present) ===
On September 17, 2024, Eldredge announced his eighth and third Christmas album Merry Christmas (Welcome to the Family). It was released on September 27, 2024. It is his first album released independently after parting ways with Warner Nashville. On December 27, 2024, Eldredge announced a song, "Gorgeous". It was released on January 3, 2025. On February 19, 2025, Eldredge announced his second EP, Lonestar Lovers. It was released on March 14, 2025.

== Discography ==
- Bring You Back (2013)
- Illinois (2015)
- Glow (2016)
- Brett Eldredge (2017)
- Sunday Drive (2020)
- Mr. Christmas (2021)
- Songs About You (2022)
- Merry Christmas (Welcome to the Family) (2024)

== Awards and nominations ==
Year	Ceremony	Category	Work	Result	Ref
2011	American Country Awards	Music Video by a New Artist	"Raymond"	Nominated	
2013	American Country Awards	Single by a New Artist	"Don't Ya"	Nominated	
2013	American Country Awards	Music Video by a New Artist	"Don't Ya"	Nominated	
2014	Academy of Country Music Awards	New Artist of the Year	Himself	Nominated	
2014	CMT Music Awards	Breakthrough Video of the Year	"Beat of the Music"	Nominated	
2014	ASCAP Country Music Awards	Top 5 Songs	"Don't Ya"	Won	
2014	BMI Country Awards	Top 50 Songs	"Don't Ya"	Won	
2014	Country Music Association Awards	New Artist of the Year	Himself	Won	
2014	American Country Countdown Awards	Song of the Year	"Beat of the Music"	Won	
2014	American Country Countdown Awards	Breakthrough Artist of the Year	Himself	Nominated	
2015	CMT Music Awards	Performance of the Year	"Beat of the Music" (from CMT's Ultimate Kickoff Party)	Nominated	
2015	ASCAP Country Music Awards	Most Performed Songs	"Mean to Me"	Won	
2015	BMI Country Awards	Song of the Year	"Beat of the Music"	Won	
2015	BMI Country Awards	Top 50 Songs	"Beat of the Music"	Won	
2015	BMI Country Awards	Top 50 Songs	"Mean to Me"	Won	
2016	Academy of Country Music Awards	New Male Vocalist of the Year	Himself	Nominated	
2016	Academy of Country Music Awards	Male Vocalist of the Year	Himself	Nominated	
2017	CMT Music Awards	Video of the Year	"Wanna Be That Song"	Nominated	
2017	Teen Choice Awards	Choice Snapchatter	Himself	Nominated	
