= Ross Copperman =

American musician (born 1982)

- Copperman in 2026 (portrait by David O'Donohue)

Background information
- Born: October 1, 1982 (age 44)
- Origin: Roanoke, Virginia, U.S.
- Genres: Country; pop; rock
- Occupations: Record producer; singer; songwriter
- Years active: 2002–present
- Labels: Phonogenic; RCA

Ross Copperman (born October 1, 1982) is an American Grammy-nominated record producer, singer and songwriter. After his experience as an artist in the UK, Copperman went to Nashville, Tennessee, where he pursued a career in country music. He has written 43 No. 1 songs including Billy Currington's "Don't It", Luke Bryan's "Strip It Down", Keith Urban's "John Cougar, John Deere, John 3:16" and Kenny Chesney's "Get Along". Copperman has also produced for artists including Brett Eldredge, Dierks Bentley, Eli Young Band, Darius Rucker, Jake Owen, Kelsea Ballerini, Kenny Chesney, Chayce Beckham, Warren Zeiders and Gabby Barrett.

Copperman has received a Grammy nomination for Best Country Song with Blake Shelton's "I Lived It", has won Songwriter of the Year at the Academy of Country Music Awards and is a 3x BMI Awards Songwriter of the Year. In 2020, he was nominated for Single of the Year at the CMA Awards with Gabby Barrett's 7× platinum single, "I Hope". The song spent 62 weeks on the Billboard Hot 100 chart. Copperman co-wrote and co-produced Kelsea Ballerini's album, kelsea, including the No. 1 single and CMA Musical Event of the Year "half of my hometown" (featuring Kenny Chesney).

== Biography ==
=== Early life ===
Copperman was born and grew up in Roanoke, Virginia. He attended Glenvar High School in Roanoke County. He started playing the piano at age 3, and started writing songs in college at James Madison University. The first song he wrote is titled "Fly Away", and it appears on his studio debut album.

=== Early career ===
Ross signed with Phonogenic Records in the UK and began working on his debut album in 2006. The first single he released, "As I Choke", managed to be the most popular iTunes Single of the Week in the UK, notching up 36,457 downloads in a one-week period.

- His second single, "All She Wrote", entered the UK top 40 in May 2007, and was featured in a couple of American TV shows.
- The third single, "Found You", was released a few months later.
- His debut album, Welcome to Reality, was released on May 28, 2007.
- Ross Copperman's original Christmas song "Christmas Time" was released on iTunes on November 20, 2008.
- Ross Copperman's EP "This is Ross Copperman" was released on iTunes on November 16, 2009.

=== Present career ===
Despite the success of his UK debut, Copperman decided to relocate to Nashville to focus on songwriting and production. In this period he wrote other notable hits including, "Glass" by Thompson Square, "Tip It On Back" by Dierks Bentley, "Pirate Flag" by Kenny Chesney, "Lay Low" by Josh Turner, "Trouble" by Gloriana and "Prizefighter" by Trisha Yearwood.

Ross has had numerous major synch placements in TV shows and movies, such as CSI: NY, The Vampire Diaries, The Biggest Loser, NCIS, Nashville and Grey's Anatomy which featured his song "The Stars Are On Your Side" in S15, E22.

== Awards and nominations ==
Year	Association	Category	Recipient	Result	Ref
2014	Country Music Association Awards	Country Album of the Year	Dierks Bentley's Riser	Nominated	
2015	Grammy Awards	Country Album of the Year	Dierks Bentley's Riser	Nominated	
2015	Country Music Association Awards	CMA Triple Play Award x2	Himself, for being a songwriter on 6 No. 1 songs in a 12-month period	Won	
2016	Country Music Association Awards	CMA Triple Play Award x2	Himself, for being a songwriter on 6 No. 1 songs in a 12-month period	Won	
2016	Academy of Country Music Awards	Songwriter of the Year	Himself	Won	
2016	BMI Awards	Songwriter of the Year	Himself	Won	
2017	Country Music Association Awards	CMA Triple Play Award	Himself, for being a songwriter on 3 No. 1 songs in a 12-month period	Won	
2017	BMI Awards	Songwriter of the Year	Himself	Won	
2017	GMA Awards	Dove Award for Worship Album of the Year	For production of Never Lose Sight by Chris Tomlin	Won	
2018	Country Music Association Awards	Musical Event of the Year	For production of "Burning Man" by Dierks Bentley with The Brothers Osborne	Nominated	
2018	Country Music Association Awards	Album of the Year	Dierks Bentley's The Mountain	Nominated	
2018	Country Music Association Awards	Album of the Year	Keith Urban's Graffiti U	Nominated	
2018	Academy of Country Music Awards	Song of the Year	Keith Urban's "Female"	Nominated	
2019	Academy of Country Music Awards	Musical Event of the Year	"Burning Man" by Dierks Bentley with The Brothers Osborne	Won	
2019	Academy of Country Music Awards	Album of the Year	Dierks Bentley's The Mountain	Nominated	
2019	Academy of Country Music Awards	Songwriter of the Year	Himself	Nominated	
2019	Grammy Awards	Best Country Song	Blake Shelton's "I Lived It"	Nominated	
2019	BMI Awards	Songwriter of the Year	Himself	Won	
2020	Country Music Association Awards	Single of the Year	Gabby Barrett's "I Hope"	Nominated	
2020	BMI Awards	Songwriter of the Year	Himself	Won	
2021	Academy of Country Music Awards	Single of the Year	Gabby Barrett's "I Hope"	Nominated	
2022	Country Music Association Awards	Single of the Year	"half of my hometown" by Kelsea Ballerini feat. Kenny Chesney	Nominated	
2022	Country Music Association Awards	Musical Event of the Year	"Beers On Me" by Dierks Bentley, Breland, HARDY	Won	
2022	Academy of Country Music Awards	Musical Event of the Year	"half of my hometown" by Kelsea Ballerini feat. Kenny Chesney	Nominated	

== Discography ==
=== Albums ===
- 2003: Believe
- 2007: Welcome to Reality
- 2009: This Is Ross Copperman
- 2012: Holding On and Letting Go
- 2012: My Love Will
- 2013: Lighthouse Shine EP

=== Singles ===
- 2006: "As I Choke" (iTunes Single)
- 2007: "All She Wrote"
- 2007: "Found You"
- 2008: "Bleeding Love"
- 2008: "Christmas Time"
- 2015: "Hunger"

== Number one hits ==
Listed are the No. 1 country hits Ross Copperman has co-written, as recorded by the artists below:

2013

- "Beat of the Music", recorded by Brett Eldredge
- "Point at You", recorded by Justin Moore

2015

- "Don't It", recorded by Billy Currington
- "Drunk on Your Love", recorded by Brett Eldredge
- "John Cougar, John Deere, John 3:16", recorded by Keith Urban
- "Lose My Mind", recorded by Brett Eldredge
- "Smoke", recorded by A Thousand Horses
- "Strip It Down", recorded by Luke Bryan

2016

- "American Country Love Song", recorded by Jake Owen
- "Break on Me", recorded by Keith Urban
- "Confession", recorded by Florida Georgia Line
- "I Know Somebody", recorded by LoCash
- "Setting the World on Fire", recorded by Kenny Chesney featuring Pink
- "Wanna Be That Song", recorded by Brett Eldredge

2017

- "Black", recorded by Dierks Bentley
- "If I Told You", recorded by Darius Rucker

2018

- "Get Along", recorded by Kenny Chesney
- "Woman, Amen", recorded by Dierks Bentley

2019

- “Living”, recorded by Dierks Bentley
- "Love Ain't", recorded by the Eli Young Band
- "Love Someone", recorded by Brett Eldredge

2020

- "Catch", recorded by Brett Young
- “Happy Anywhere”, recorded by Blake Shelton ft. Gwen Stefani
- “Nobody but You”, recorded by Blake Shelton ft. Gwen Stefani
- "What She Wants Tonight", recorded by Luke Bryan

2021

- "Beers and Sunshine", recorded by Darius Rucker

2023

- "Dancin' in the Country" recorded by Tyler Hubbard
- "Gold" recorded by Dierks Bentley

2024

- "23" recorded by Chayce Beckham (produced)
- "Pretty Little Poison" recorded by Warren Zeiders (produced)

2025

- "Country House" recorded by Sam Hunt

== Songwriting discography ==
Year	Artist	Album	Song title	Co-written with
2011	Dia Frampton	Dia Frampton	"The Broken Ones"	Dia Frampton, Tom Shapiro
2011	Jennette McCurdy	Jennette McCurdy	"Generation Love"	Tom Douglas, Heather Morgan
2011	Thompson Square	Thompson Square	"Glass"	Jon Nite
2011	Chris Young	Neon	"Save Water, Drink Beer"	Jon Nite, Megan Connor
2012	Dierks Bentley	Home	"Tip It On Back"	Jon Nite, Tully Kennedy
2012	Dierks Bentley	Country & Cold Cans	"Summer On Fire"	Brett Beavers, Ryan Tyndell
2012	Brandon Heath	Blue Mountain	"Jesus in Disguise"	Brandon Heath, Lee Thomas Miller
2012	Brandon Heath	Blue Mountain	"Love Does"	Brandon Heath, Lee Thomas Miller
2012	Brandon Heath	Blue Mountain	"In The Dust"	Brandon Heath, Lee Thomas Miller
2012	Brandon Heath	Blue Mountain	"Diamond"	Brandon Heath, Lee Thomas Miller
2012	Brandon Heath	Blue Mountain	"Dyin' Day"	Brandon Heath, Lee Thomas Miller
2012	JT Hodges	JT Hodges	"Goodbyes Made You Mine"	JT Hodges, Jon Nite
2012	Jana Kramer	Jana Kramer	"One Of The Boys"	Jana Kramer, Jon Nite
2013	Kenny Chesney	Life on a Rock	"Pirate Flag"	David Lee Murphy
2013	Brett Eldredge	Bring You Back	"Beat of the Music"	Brett Eldredge, Heather Morgan
2013	Brett Eldredge	Bring You Back	"Bring You Back"	Heather Morgan
2013	Brett Eldredge	Bring You Back	"Go On Without Me"	Brett Eldredge, Natalie Hemby
2013	Scotty McCreery	See You Tonight	"Get Gone With You"	Lynn Hutton, Tammi Hutton
2013	Justin Moore	Off The Beaten Path	"Point at You"	Rhett Akins, Ben Hayslip
2013	Thompson Square	Just Feels Good	"Run"	Michael Davey
2013	Keith Urban	Fuse	"Black Leather Jacket"	Tom Douglas, Jaren Johnston
2013	Keith Urban	Fuse	"Love's Poster Child"	Heather Morgan
2013	Keith Urban	Fuse	"Even The Stars Fall 4 U"	Keith Urban, David Lee Murphy
2013	Keith Urban	Fuse	"She's My 11"	Keith Urban, Jaren Johnston
2014	Blake Shelton	Bringing Back the Sunshine	"I Need My Girl"	Rhett Akins, Ben Hayslip
2014	Trisha Yearwood	PrizeFighter: Hit After Hit	"PrizeFighter"	Jessi Alexander, Sarah Buxton
2014	Florida Georgia Line	Anything Goes	"Angel"	Tyler Hubbard, Brian Kelley, Rodney Clawson
2014	Florida Georgia Line	Anything Goes	"Confession"	Rodney Clawson, Matt Jenkins
2014	Dallas Smith	Lifted	"Heat Rises"	Rodney Clawson, Jaren Johnston
2014	Dallas Smith	Lifted	"Just Say When"	Rodney Clawson, Ben Hayslip
2015	Eli Young Band	Turn It On	"Plastic"	Ashley Gorley, Jeremy Stover, Mike Eli
2015	Eli Young Band	Turn It On	"Your Place Or Mine"	Jeremy Stover, Mike Eli, Jon Jones
2015	Eli Young Band	Turn It On	"Drink You Up"	Jeremy Stover, Mike Eli, Jon Jones
2015	Billy Currington	Summer Forever	"Don't It"	Ashley Gorley, Jaren Johnston
2015	Josh Turner	Upcoming Album	"Lay Low"	Tony Martin, Mark Nesler
2015	Gloriana	Three	"Trouble"	Rachel Reinert, Mike Gossin, Jon Nite
2015	A Thousand Horses	Southernality	"Smoke"	Michael Hobby, Jon Nite
2015	Jake Owen	—N/a	"Real Life"	Shane McAnally, Josh Osborne, Ashley Gorley
2015	Brett Eldredge	Illinois	"Fire"	Brett Eldredge, Jon Nite
2015	Brett Eldredge	Illinois	"You Can't Stop Me (featuring Thomas Rhett)"	Brett Eldredge, Heather Morgan
2015	Brett Eldredge	Illinois	"Lose My Mind"	Brett Eldredge, Heather Morgan, Brian Burton, Thomas Calloway, Gian Franco Reverberi, Gian Piero Reverberi
2015	Brett Eldredge	Illinois	"Wanna Be That Song"	Brett Eldredge, Scooter Carusoe
2015	Brett Eldredge	Illinois	"If You Were My Girl"	Brett Eldredge, Jon Nite
2015	Brett Eldredge	Illinois	"Just A Taste"	Brett Eldredge, Heather Morgan
2015	Brett Eldredge	Illinois	"Drunk on Your Love"	Brett Eldredge
2015	Brett Eldredge	Illinois	"Shadow"	Brett Eldredge, Heather Morgan
2015	Brett Eldredge	Illinois	"Going Away For Awhile"	Brett Eldredge, Heather Morgan
2016	Jake Owen	American Love	"Where I Am"	Shane McAnally, Hillary Lindsey
2016	Jake Owen	American Love	"Everybody Dies Young"	Shane McAnally, Josh Osborne, Scott Stepakoff
2016	Jake Owen	American Love	"You Ain't Going Nowhere"	Dallas Davidson, Ashley Gorley
2016	Jake Owen	American Love	"American Country Love Song"	Ashley Gorley, Jaren Johnston
2016	Keith Urban	Ripcord	"Break on Me"	Jon Nite
2016	Keith Urban	Ripcord	"John Cougar, John Deere, John 3:16"	Shane McAnally, Josh Osborne
2016	Dallas Smith	Side Effects	"Sky Stays This Blue"	Ashley Gorley, Josh Osborne
2016	Dallas Smith	Side Effects	"Autograph"	Nicolle Clawson, Haley Georgia
2016	Dallas Smith	Side Effects	"I'm Already Gone"	Rodney Clawson, Marv Green
2016	Dallas Smith	Side Effects	"Twelve Pack Soundtrack"	Josh Kear, Chris Tompkins
2016	Jerrod Niemann and Lee Brice	N/A	"A Little More Love"	Shane McAnally, Natalie Hemby, Kristi Neumann
2016	LoCash	The Fighters	"I Know Somebody"	Jeremy Stover, Rhett Akins
2016	Darius Rucker	When Was the Last Time	"If I Told You"	Jon Nite, Shane McAnally
2016	Kenny Chesney	Cosmic Hallelujah	"Noise"	Jon Nite, Kenny Chesney, Shane McAnally
2016	Kenny Chesney	Cosmic Hallelujah	"Setting the World on Fire" feat. Pink	Josh Osborne, Matt Jenkins
2016	Dierks Bentley	Black	"Black"	Dierks Bentley, Ashley Gorley
2016	Eli Young Band	Fingerprints	"Saltwater Gospel"	Ashley Gorley, Nicolle Gallyon
2016	Joe Nichols	N/A	"Undone"	Josh Osborne, Trevor Rosen
2016	Richard Marx	The Ultimate Collection	"Last Thing I Wanted	Richard Marx, Ashley Gorley
2017	Gary Allan	N/A	"Mess Me Up"	Ashley Gorley, Shane McAnally
2017	Parmalee	27861	"Sunday Morning"	Josh Osborne, Matt Thomas
2017	Chase Rice	Lambs & Lions	"Three Chords and the Truth"	Jon Nite, Chase Rice
2017	Dierks Bentley	Black	"What the Hell Did I Say"	Chris Tompkins, Josh Kear
2017	Justin Moore	Kinda Don't Care	"Kinda Don't Care"	Rhett Akins, Ben Hayslip
2017	Keith Urban	Graffiti U	"Female"	Shane McAnally, Josh Osborne
2017	Blake Shelton	Texoma Shore	"I Lived It"	Rhett Akins, Ben Hayslip, Ashley Gorley
2018	LANCO	Hallelujah Nights	"Born to Love You"	Ashley Gorley, Brandon Lancaster, Josh Osborne
2018	Dierks Bentley	The Mountain	"Woman, Amen"	Dierks Bentley, Josh Kear
2018	Dierks Bentley	The Mountain	"Living"	Jon Nite
2018	Dierks Bentley	The Mountain	"Nothing On But the Stars"	Dierks Bentley, Jon Nite
2018	Dierks Bentley	The Mountain	"Goodbye in Telluride"	Dierks Bentley, Scooter Carusoe, Ashley Gorley
2018	Dierks Bentley	The Mountain	"Son of the Sun"	Dierks Bentley, Jon Nite, Jon Randall
2018	Dierks Bentley	The Mountain	"Stranger To Myself"	Heather Morgan, Dierks Bentley
2018	Kenny Chesney	Single Release	"Get Along"	Shane McAnally, Josh Osborne
2018	Mat Kearney	Crazytalk	"Sleeping at the Wheel"	Heather Morgan, Mat Kearney, Oumou Sangare
2018	Eli Young Band	Single Release	"Love Ain't"	Ashley Gorley, Shane McAnally
2018	Brett Eldredge	Single Release	"Love Someone"	Heather Morgan, Brett Eldredge
2019	King Calaway	Rivers	"World For Two"	James Abrahart, Josh Osborne
2019	Backstreet Boys	DNA	"Just Like You Like It"	Josh Kear, Dustin Lynch
2019	Luke Bryan	Born Here, Live Here, Die Here	"What She Wants Tonight"	Luke Bryan, Hillary Lindsey, Jon Nite
2019	Jordan Davis	Jordan Davis	"Cool Anymore (feat. Julia Michaels)"	Jordan Davis, Nicolle Galyon, Emily Weisband
2019	Old Dominion	Old Dominion	"Paint the Grass Green"	Matt Ramsey, Trevor Rosen, Josh Osborne, Brad Tursi
2020	Blake Shelton	Fully Loaded:God's Country	"Nobody But You (Duet with Gwen Stefani)"	Tommy Lee James, Shane McAnally, Josh Osborne
2020	Kelsea Ballerini	kelsea	"the other girl (with halsey)"	Kelsea Ballerini, Ashley Frangipane, Shane McAnally
2020	Kelsea Ballerini	kelsea	"love me like a girl"	Kelsea Ballerini, Lauren Grieve, Hillary Lindsey, Jordan Minton
2020	Kelsea Ballerini	kelsea	"love and hate"	Kelsea Ballerini, Ed Sheeran
2020	Kelsea Ballerini	kelsea	"bragger"	Kelsea Ballerini, Nicolle Galyon, Shane McAnally, Jimmy Robbins
2020	Kelsea Ballerini	kelsea	"half of my hometown (feat. kenny chesney)"	Kelsea Ballerini, Nicolle Galyon, Shane McAnally, Jimmy Robbins
2020	Kelsea Ballerini	kelsea	"needy"	Kelsea Ballerini, Julia Michaels
2020	Gabby Barrett	Goldmine	"Write It on My Heart"	Gabby Barrett, Josh Osborne
2020	Gabby Barrett	Goldmine	"You're the Only Reason"	Gabby Barrett, Josh Kear
2020	Darius Rucker	Single Release	"Beers and Sunshine"	J.T. Harding, Josh Osborne, Darius Rucker
2020	Kenny Chesney	Here and Now	"Tip of My Tongue"	Kenny Chesney, Ed Sheeran
2020	Tim McGraw	Here on Earth	"Hold You Tonight"	Jon Nite
2020	Cole Swindell	Down Home Sessions V - EP	"All Nighter"	Ashley Gorley, Jon Nite, Cole Swindell
2020	Blake Shelton	Single Release	"Happy Anywhere (feat. Gwen Stefani)"	Matt Jenkins, Josh Osborne
2020	Richard Marx	Limitless	"Last Thing I Wanted	Richard Marx, Ashley Gorley
2021	Luke Bryan	Country Does	"Country Does"	Shane McAnally, Josh Osborne
2021	Florida Georgia Line	Life Rolls On	"Always Gonna Love You"	Brett Eldredge, Rob Mounsey
2021	Florida Georgia Line	Life Rolls On	"Eyes Closed"	Cassadee Pope, Heather Morgan
2021	Joe Nichols	Good Day For Living	"Home Run"	Josh Osborne, Michael Hardy, Tyler Hubbard, Brian Kelley, Corey Crowder
2021	Blake Shelton	Body Language	"The Flow"	Michael Hardy, Tyler Hubbard, Brian Kelley, Corey Crowder
2021	Cassadee Pope	Thrive	"Say It First"	Josh Osborne & Matt Jenkins
2021	Dan + Shay	Single Release	"Good Things"	Josh Osborne & Shane McAnally
2021	Michael Ray	Picture	"Picture"	David Garcia, Michael Hardy & Michael Ray
2021	Brett Eldredge	Mr. Christmas	"Mr. Christmas"	Shane McAnally & Maren Morris
2022	Tim Hicks	Talk to Time	"Talk to Time	Bobby Pinson, Casey Beathard & Randy Houser
2022	Brandon Lay	Single Release	"Good Good Life"	Luke Niccoli, Maia
2022	Randy Houser	Note To Self	"Note To Self"	Brandon Lay, Jon Nite
2022	Cole Swindell	Stereotype	"Girl Goes Crazy"	Cole Swindell, Michael Hardy
2022	Jon Pardi	Mr. Saturday Night	"Fill ’Er Up"	Jon Nite & Travis Hill
2022	Alexander Ludwig	Single Release	"Faded On Me"	Brice Long & Jon Pardi
2022	Jimmie Allen	Tulip Drive	"every time i say amen"	Michael Hardy, Brett Tyler & Kolby Cooper
2023	Brad Paisley	Single Release	"So Many Summers"	Brad Paisley, Lee Thomas Miller
2024	Meghan Patrick	Golden Child	"Why Couldn't I Cry"	Meghan Patrick, Caitlyn Smith, Ben Williams
2024	Kenny Chesney	Born	"Guilty Pleasure"	Josh Osborne, Kenny Chesney, Shane McAnally
2024	Chris Young	Young Love & Saturday Nights	"Down"	Chris Young, John Byron, Josh Osborne
2024	Kenny Chesney	Born	"One Lonely Island"	David Lee Murphy, Josh Osborne, Kenny Chesney
2024	Sam Hunt	Locked Up	"Country House"	Michael Lotten, Sam Hunt, Josh Osborne
2024	Eli Young Band	10,000 Towns	"Your Place Or Mine"	Jeremy Stover, Mike Eli, Jon Jones
2024	Tenille Arts	to be honest	"Next Best Thing"	Tenille Arts, Emily Weisband
2024	Tenille Arts	to be honest	"To Be Honest	Tenille Arts, Emily Weisband, James McNair
2024	Meghan Patrick	Golden Child	"Iron Man"	Meghan Patrick, Natalie Hemby, Ben Williams
2024	Kayley Green	Shadow of a Cowboy	"Shadow of A Cowboy"	Kayley Green, Jon Nite
2024	Meghan Patrick	Golden Child	"This Town"	Meghan Patrick, Jake Mitchell, Lauren Hungate
2024	Old Dominion	Oldies But Goodies	"How Good Is That"	Matthew Ramsey, Trevor Rosen, Brad Tursi, Josh Osborne
2024	Ross Copperman	Goodbye	"Goodbye"	Ross Copperman
2024	Ross Copperman	The Places We'll Go	"The Places We'll Go"	Ross Copperman
2024	Sophia Scott	Tumbleweed	"Tumbleweed"	Sophia Scott, Ava Suppelsa
2025	Warren Zeiders	Relapse, Lies, & Betrayal	"Can A Heart Take"	Randy Montana, Ryan Beaver, Warren Zeiders
2025	Warren Zeiders	Relapse, Lies, & Betrayal	"Lies"	Blake Pendergrass, Justin Ebach, Warren Zeiders
2025	Warren Zeiders	Relapse, Lies, & Betrayal	"Without You"	Blake Pendergrass, Justin Ebach, Warren Zeiders
2025	Sophia Scott	Either Way	"Either Way"	Sophia Scott, Ava Suppelsa
2025	Tucker Wetmore	What No To	"Goodbye Whiskey"	Tucker Wetmore, Thomas Archer, Jacob Hackworth,
2025	Blake Shelton	For Recreational Use Only	"Don’t Mississippi"	Shane McAnally, Ben Hayslip, Josh Osborne
2025	Dierks Bentley	Broken Branches	"Never You (feat. Miranda Lambert)"	Scooter Carusoe, Ben Williams
2025	Dierks Bentley	Broken Branches	"She Hates Me"	Dierks Bentley, Ashley Gorley, Chase McGill, Jimmy Allen, Wesley Scantlin
2025	Iris Copperman	Emoji Of A Rainbow	"Emoji Of A Rainbow"	Iris Copperman, Sara Bares
2025	Brett Young	2.0	"Full House"	Brett Young, Jon Nite
2025	Palmer Anthony	Rodeo Clown	"Save Some Heartbreak"	Jon Nite, Randy Montana, Palmer Anthony
2025	Lauren Alaina	Stages	"Little Things"	Lauren Alaina, Seth Ennis, Emily Falvey
2025	Old Dominion	Barbara	"Crying in a Beach Bar"	Matthew Ramsey, Trevor Rosen, Matt Jenkins
2025	Old Dominion	Barbara	"Making Good Time"	Matthew Ramsey, Trevor Rosen, Brad Tursi, Ross Ellis
2025	Old Dominion	Barbara	"Man or the Song"	Matthew Ramsey, Trevor Rosen, Brad Tursi, Shane McAnally
2025	Old Dominion	Barbara	"Me Most Nights"	Matthew Ramsey, Trevor Rosen, Brad Tursi
2025	Old Dominion	Barbara	"Miss You Man"	Matthew Ramsey, Trevor Rosen, Matt Jenkins
2025	Wesko	Hold On	"Hard Times"	Wesley Holmes, Randy Montana, Nick Walsh
2025	Gabby Barrett	Ain't Supposed To Be	"Ain't Supposed To Be"	Chase McGill, Gabby Barrett, Jon Nite
2025	Wesko	Hold On	"Hold On"	Wesley Holmes, Randy Montana, Nick Walsh
2026	Iris Copperman	Middle School Dropout	"Awkward"	Iris Copperman, Lydia Sutherland
2026	Iris Copperman	Middle School Dropout	"Bully"	Iris Copperman, Shane McAnally
2026	Iris Copperman	Middle School Dropout	"Kinder"	Iris Copperman, Annie Schindel
2026	Iris Copperman	Middle School Dropout	"Middle School Dropout"	Iris Copperman, Annie Schindel
2026	Iris Copperman	Middle School Dropout	"Roses"	Iris Copperman, Annie Schindel
2026	Iris Copperman	Middle School Dropout	"Struggle Bus"	Iris Copperman, Lydia Sutherland
2026	MC4D, Clara Mae	COMPASS	"Still Got Time"	Clara Hagman, Corey Sanders, Frasner Churchill, Christopher Drake, Matthew Drake
2026	Trey Lewis	Hanks Hurtin' Too	"Hanks Hurtin' Too"	Ben Hayslip, Rhett Akins
2026	Tim Hicks	Going Somewhere	"The Pilot"	James McNair, Brad Tursi
2026	Jo Dee Messina	Bridges	"Days You Don't Get Back"	Jo Dee Messina, Tyler Hubbard, Jon Nite
2026	Warren Zeiders	No Brakes	"Mine"	Jackson Morgan, Joe Kirkland, Warren Zeiders

== Select production discography ==
Year	Artist	Song(s)/Album	Notes
2012	JT Hodges	"Goodbyes Made You Mine"	Producer
2012	The Dirty Guv'nahs	Somewhere Beneath These Southern Skies (Album)	Producer
2012	Hayden Panettiere	"Love Like Mine, Used" (The Music of Nashville: Season 1 Volume 1)	Producer
2012	Hayden Panettiere & Charles Esten	"Undermine" (The Music of Nashville: Season 1 Volume 1)	Producer
2012	Connie Britton	"Already Gone" (Nashville Season 1)	Producer
2013	Brett Eldredge	"Beat of the Music", "Bring You Back", "Go On Without Me" (Bring You Back)	Producer
2013	Keith Urban	"She's My 11" (Fuse)	Producer
2013	Clare Bowen & Charles Esten	"This Time" (The Music of Nashville: Season 2, Volume 1)	Producer
2013	Aubrey Peeples	Tell Me (Nashville Season 2)	Producer
2013	Phil Vassar	"Love Is Alive"	Producer
2014	Dierks Bentley	Riser (Album) – No. 1 Country Album	Producer
2015	Dierks Bentley	Black	Producer
2015	Eli Young Band	Fingerprints	Producer
2015	Brett Eldredge	"Fire", "You Can't Stop Me", "Lose My Mind", "Wanna Be That Song", "Time Well Spent", "If You Were My Girl", "Just A Taste", "Drunk On Your Love", "Shadow", "Going Away For Awhile" (Illinois)	Producer
2015	Jake Owen	"Real Life"	Co-Producer w/Shane McAnally
2015	Chris Tomlin	"Good Good Father" (TBA)	Producer
2015	Drake White	Extended Plays	Producer
2016	Jake Owen	"American Love", "After Midnight", "Where I Am", "Everybody Dies Young", "LAX", "If He Ain't Gonna Love You", "You Ain't Going Nowhere", "American Country Love Song"	Co-produced w/Shane McAnally, Luke Laird
2016	Richard Marx	"Last Thing I Wanted" (The Ultimate Collection)	Producer, composer, all instruments, Programming
2016	Chris Tomlin	"God and God Alone" (Passion)	Producer
2017	Dierks Bentley	"Hold The Light" (Only the Brave), "The Mountain"	Producer
2017	Darius Rucker	"Bring It On", "Life's Too Short", "If I Told You", "Hands On Me", "Story to Tell"	Producer, composer, engineer
2017	Brett Eldredge	"Love Someone", "Superhero", "The Reason", "Haven't Met You", "Heartbreaker"	Producer, composer, engineer
2017	Keith Urban	"Female"	Producer
2018	Dierks Bentley	"Woman, Amen", "Living", "Nothing On But the Stars", "Goodbye in Telluride", "Son of the Sun", "Stranger To Myself"	Producer, Assistant Engineer, composer, Guitar (Acoustic), Guitar (Electric), Keyboards, Percussion, Programming, Vocals (Background)
2018	Runaway June	"Buy My Own Drinks", "I Am Too", "Got Me Where I Want You", "Fast As You"	Producer
2019	Backstreet Boys	"Just Like You Like It"	Producer
2019	Gabby Barrett	"I Hope", "The Good Ones"	Producer
2019	Runaway June	"Head Over Heels", "I Know The Way", "Trouble With This Town", "Good, Bad & Ugly", "Blue Roses"	Producer
2020	Richard Marx	"Last Thing I Wanted" (Limitless)	Producer, composer, all instruments, Programming
2020	Darius Rucker	"Beers and Sunshine"	Producer
2020	Gabby Barrett	"Hall of Fame", "I Hope (Remix)", "Goldmine", "A God Whose Got Me", "The First Noel"	Producer
2020	Kelsea Ballerini	"the way i used to", "Never Learn", "the other girl", "love me like a girl", "love and hate", "bragger", "half of my hometown", "needy"	Producer
2020	Kenny Chesney	"Wasted", "Knowing You", "You Don’t Get To", "Guys Named Captain", "Everyone She Knows"	Producer
2020	Runaway June	"We Were Rich (New Version)"	Producer
2021	Michael Ray	"Picture"	Producer
2021	Brad Paisley	"City of Music"	Producer
2021	Arthur Gunn	"Save Me Now"	Producer
2021	Chayce Beckham	"23", "23 (Steel Mix)"	Producer
2021	Chayce Beckham & Lindsay Ell	"Can’t Do Without Me"	Producer
2021	Darius Rucker	"My Masterpiece"	Producer
2021	Dierks Bentley	"Beers On Me"	Producer
2021	Gabby Barrett	"Rose Needs a Jack (Live From The Goldmine)", "I Hope (Live From The Goldmine)", "Pick Me Up", "Never Get It Back", "The Good Ones (Wedding Version)"	Producer
2022	Chayce Beckham	"Tell Me Twice", "Where the River Goes", "Doin’ it Right", "I’ll Take the Bar", "Talk to Me", "Love to Burn", "Keeping Me Up All Night"	Producer
2022	Darius Rucker	"Same Beer Different Problem"	Producer
2022	Dierks Bentley	"Gold", "High Note"	Producer
2022	Elle King	"Out Yonder", "Worth A Shot", "Try Jesus"	Producer
2022	Priscilla Block	"Just About Over You (Radio Edit)"	Producer
2023	Chayce Beckham	"Till The Day I Die"	Producer
2023	Elle King	"Ohio", "Before You Met Me", "Lucky", "Tulsa", "Crawlin’ Mood", "Bonafide", "Blacked Out", "Love Go By"	Producer
2023	Gabby Barrett	"Glory Days"	Producer
2023	Tenille Arts	"Summer Don’t Go"	Producer
2023	Warren Zeiders	"Pretty Little Poison", "Inside Your Head", "Tell Me Like It Is"	Producer
2024	Eli Young Band	"Your Place Or Mine"	Producer
2024	Tenille Arts	"Next Best Thing", "To Be Honest"	Producer
2024	Kayley Green	"Shadow of A Cowboy"	Producer
2024	Meghan Patrick	"This Town"	Producer
2024	Ross Copperman	"Goodbye", "The Places We'll Go"	Producer
2025	Warren Zeiders	"Can A Heart Take"	Producer
2025	Dierks Bentley	"Never You (feat. Miranda Lambert)", "She Hates Me"	Producer
2025	Iris Copperman	"Emoji Of A Rainbow"	Producer
2025	Old Dominion	"Making Good Time", "Me Most Nights"	Producer
2025	Wesko	"Hard Times"	Producer
2025	Gabby Barrett	"Ain't Supposed To Be"	Producer
2025	Wesko	"Hold On"	Producer
2026	Iris Copperman	"Awkward", "Bully", "Kinder", "Middle School Dropout", "Roses", "Struggle Bus"	Producer
2026	MC4D, Clara Mae	"Still Got Time"	Producer

== Mixing credits ==
Artist	Song	Album
Brett Eldredge	"You Can't Stop Me (featuring Thomas Rhett)"	Illinois
Dierks Bentley	"Back Porch"	Riser
