= Vavo =

Electronic country music duo

- Origin: London, England / Vancouver, Canada
- Genre: EDM • dance-pop • country • YEEDM
- Label: KESS Records
- Members: Jesse Fischer; Alden Martin

Vavo(stylized as VAVO) are a Canadian-British electronic/country music DJ duo composed of Canadian-born Jesse Fischer and London native Alden Martin. The duo are known for creating YEEDM, which merges country music and EDM. Vavo have earned multiple No. 1 hits on US Dance Radio.

== History ==
Canadian-born Jesse Fischer got into music around 2012, following a trip to Cancun, Mexico for Spring Break. After seeing a few DJs at nightclubs, he immediately bought a DJ board and started DJing. Alden Martin got into Dance and EDM at 10 years old and moved towards the production side of music.

Martin started producing when he was 12, after failed attempts at learning the piano. Fischer and Marting would first met in 2015 while both pushing individual projects in the dance music scene, and spending a year communicating online before working together. They decided to collaborate, eventually releasing a song on SoundCloud.

In 2019, they had a breakout year remixing Morgan Wallen, Mitchell Tenpenny, Dustin Lynch.

An edit of Wallen's “Last Night” would become a hit on TikTok. A comment on social media resulted in the music being labeled ‘YEEDM.’

The duo have gone on to have a number of hits on the Billboard charts including a remix Internet Money’s “Lemonade” Tyler Mann's “Weekends” And the track “Like Nobody” which would hit #1 on US Dance Radio.

They have had more than 100 million streams and been nominated to an EDM Award.

== Discography ==
=== Singles ===
- Dissolution (with Otto Orlandi featuring Nathan Brumely)
- Good Energy (with Redhead Roman featuring Sophia Schöenau)
- Feel Good (with Alaris)
- Ace Of Spades
- Astronomia 2K17
- How Low (with John Christian)
- Sleeping Alone
- No Friends Zone
- Right Now (featuring Caroline Kole)
- Anything For You (featuring ZHIKO)
- Like Nobody (with TalkSick)
- Day N' Night (featuring ZHIKO)
- Pieces (with Tyler Mann)
- Why Do I? (with nicopop and Zohara)
- Highs & Lows
- Weekends (I Can Feel It) (with Tyler Mann)
- Take Me Home (with Clara Mae)
- Waitin On It
- Comeback Kid (featuring Joey Hendricks)
- Reverse Cowgirl (with 220 KID)
- Keep You With Me (with Ian Harrison)
- Bullet (with Diplo and Priscilla Block)
- Lose You Tonight (with Dan Caplen)
- Run with The Sun (with Frank Walker and Bryce Vine)
- Winter (with Jared Benjamin)
- Don't Leave (with Thomas Edwards)

=== Remixes ===
- Thomas Rhett - Beautiful as U (VAVO Remix)
- Lee Brice – One of Them Girls (VAVO Remix)
- Kane Brown – Miles on It (VAVO Remix)
- Kane Brown – I Can Feel It (VAVO Remix)
- Nate Smith – World on Fire (VAVO Remix)
- Meghan Patrick – Golden Child (VAVO Remix)
- Dylan Scott – Good Times Go by Too Fast (VAVO Remix)
- Dylan Scott – This Town's Been Too Good to Us (VAVO Remix)
- Mitchell Tenpenny – We Got History (VAVO & DLAY Remix)
- Priscilla Block - Just About Over You (Radio Edit / VAVO Remix)
- Priscilla Block - My Bar (VAVO Remix)
- Priscilla Block - Couple Spring Breaks Back (VAVO Remix)
- Priscilla Block - Off the Deep End (VAVO Remix)
- Kenny Rogers - The Gambler (VAVO Remix)
- David Lee Murphy - Dust on the Bottle (VAVO Remix)
- Toby Keith - Should've Been a Cowboy (VAVO Remix)
