= Priscilla Block (EP) =

EP by Priscilla Block
- Released: April 30, 2021
- Genre: Country
- Length: 19:31
- Label: InDent; Mercury Nashville
- Producer: Robbie Artress (all tracks except 2); Ross Copperman (track 2); Jake Curry (all tracks except 2); Justin Johnson (all tracks)

Priscilla Block chronology
Different Route (2017)	Priscilla Block (2021)	Welcome to the Block Party (2022)

Singles from Priscilla Block
- 1. "Just About Over You" Released: October 9, 2020

Priscilla Block is an extended play (EP) by American country singer–songwriter Priscilla Block. It was released on April 30, 2021, via InDent Records and Mercury Nashville. The project contained six tracks, all of which were co-written by Block herself. Also included on the EP was Block's breakout single titled "Just About Over You".

== Background and content ==
Priscilla Block developed a growing fan base through social media with songs like "Thick Thighs" and "PMS". Among these songs was "Just About Over You", which gained such a following that Block was able to sign a recording contract in 2020. Block described her self-titled EP as a project that came from a sensitive place: "This EP is such a vulnerable side of who I am and where I’ve been...It’s my story of falling apart in order to find myself again." The disc was produced by Ross Copperman, along with Robbie Artress, Jake Curry and Justin Johnson.

The EP contained a total of six tracks. These songs were all co-written by Block with other songwriters. Five of the album's tracks featured co-writes from Sarah Jones, while two tracks featured Emily Kroll. Block has described both Jones and Kroll as friends. "there’s something about the three of us girls getting together, where I feel we always write great songs," she told Songwriter Universe.

== Release and promotion ==
Priscilla Block was released on April 30, 2021. It was released through Mercury Nashville as a compact disc. It was issued digitally through Mercury Nashville and InDent Records. To promote the disc, Block performed a live-streamed concert through the Hard rock cafe in Nashville, Tennessee. In the days that followed, Block also appeared for the first time at the Grand Ole Opry. The album's opening track, "Wish You Were the Whiskey", was released as a promotional single was issued on April 7, 2021. "I Bet You Wanna Know" was later issued as a second promotional single in 2021. The EP also included the radio single, "Just About Over You". The song became a top 15 hit single on the American Hot Country Songs chart in 2021.

== Track listing ==
Priscilla Block
No.	Title	Writer(s)	Length
1.	"Wish You Were the Whiskey"	Josh Beale; Priscilla Block; Kate Hasting; Sarah Jones	3:08
2.	"Just About Over You" (radio edit)	Block; Jones; Emily Kroll	3:08
3.	"Heels in Hand"	Robbie Artress; Beale; Block; Hasting; Jones	3:38
4.	"Sad Girls Do Sad Things"	Block; Jones; Kroll	3:45
5.	"Bad Part of Good"	Artress; Block	3:12
6.	"I Bet You Wanna Know"	Stone Aielli; Block; Jones	2:37
Total length:			19:31

== Personnel ==
All credits are adapted from the liner notes of Priscilla Block and AllMusic.

Musical personnel

- Stone Aielli – Piano
- Robbie Artress – Acoustic guitar, electric guitar, piano
- Josh Beale – Acoustic guitar, background vocals, electric guitar
- Priscilla Block – Background vocals, lead vocals
- Dave Cohen – Keyboards
- Jim Cooley – Background vocals
- Jake Curry – Background vocals, electric guitar
- Sarah Jones – Background vocals
- Tony Lucido – Bass
- Danny Rader – Acoustic guitar, banjo, bouzouki, electric guitar, Hammond B3 organ, percussion, piano, synthesizer
- Jerry Roe – Drums
- Jimmie Lee Sloas – Bass guitar
- Bryan Sutton – Banjo, dobro, acoustic guitar, 12-string acoustic guitar, mandolin
- Derek Wells – Electric guitar
- Nir Z – Drums, percussion

Technical personnel

- Stone Aielli – Programming
- Ribbie Artress – Editing, producer, programming, recording
- Sean R. Badum – Assistant engineer
- Drew Bollman – Recording
- Jim Cooley – Engineer
- Ross Copperman – Engineer, mixing, producing, programming
- Jake Curry – Producer, programming
- Mike "Frog" Griffifth – Production coordinator
- Justin Johnson – Producer, programming
- Scott Johnson – Production coordination
- Zack Kuhlman – Mixing assistant
- Tony Lucido – Engineer
- Andrew Mendelson – Mastering engineer
- Danny Rader – Programming, engineer
- Lance Van Dyke – Assistant engineer

== Release history ==
Region	Date	Format	Label	Ref.
United States	April 30, 2021	Compact disc; digital download; streaming	InDent Records; Mercury Nashville	
