= Golden Child =

Golden Child may refer to:

== Novels, stories and plays ==
- The Golden Child (novel), a 1977 novel by Penelope Fitzgerald
- Golden Child (novel), novel by Claire Adam listed by the BBC as one of the 100 'most influential' novels
- Golden Child (play), a 1998 play by David Henry Hwang
- Golden Child (comics), a Marvel Comics mutant

== Music ==
- Golden Child, a 2018 album by Judith Hill
- "Golden Child", a 1997 song by DJ Sammy from the album Life Is Just a Game
- "Golden Child", a 2018 song by Say Lou Lou from the album Immortelle
- Golden Child (Lil Durk song)
- Golden Child (album), a 2024 album by Meghan Patrick
  - "Golden Child" (Meghan Patrick song), 2024
- Golden Child (band), a South Korean boy band
- "Golden Child (Alicia Keys song)", a 2023 song by Alicia Keys

== Other uses ==
- The Golden Child, a 1986 film starring Eddie Murphy
- "Golden child" entry in the List of stock characters
