= Welcome to the Block Party =

Studio album by Priscilla Block
- Released: February 11, 2022
- Genres: Country; country pop
- Length: 34:22
- Labels: InDent; Mercury Nashville
- Producers: Robbie Artress; Ross Copperman; Jake Curry; Justin Johnson

Priscilla Block chronology
Priscilla Block (2020)	Welcome to the Block Party (2022)	Things You Didn't See (2025)

Singles from Welcome to the Block Party
- 1. "Just About Over You" Released: October 9, 2020; 2. "My Bar" Released: January 14, 2022

Welcome to the Block Party is the debut studio album by American country music singer–songwriter Priscilla Block. It was released on February 11, 2022, via InDent Records and Mercury Records Nashville. The disc is the debut studio album of Block's music career and included a total of 12 tracks. The project included Block's top 20 single "Just About Over You", along with 11 additional self composed tracks. The album received positive reviews from writers and critics following its release.

== Background ==
Priscilla Block had lived in Nashville, Tennessee for several years prior to reaching success. She began performing self-penned songs through the social media platform TikTok in 2020. These songs went viral, including the composition "Just About Over You". The song brought Block to the attention of Mercury Records Nashville, who signed her to a recording contract in 2020. In 2021, the label issued her debut extended play of several songs. It would be followed by Welcome to the Block Party, which marked the debut studio project of her career. The album's sound and themes were built around "Just About Over You", according to Block. "It's the song that this whole album is built around. Every song on this project is shaped around that time in my life and the highs and the lows that I felt," she told People. Although the album had been finished for a long time prior, Block wanted to wait until it was "the right timing".

== Recording and content ==
Welcome to the Block Party was produced by Robbie Artress, Ross Copperman, Jake Curry and Justin Johnson. According to Block, the album was mostly recorded in a small basement in Nashville. The project contained a total of 12 tracks, all co-written by Block. Block described the album's style and sound as "sassy, trashy, and sad" to American Songwriter. Four of the album's songs were taken from her 2021 EP: "Just About Over You", "Wish You Were the Whiskey" and "Heels in Hand".

The album includes the song "Thick Thighs", which was among her first songs to go viral on TikTok in 2020. The song's concept is focused around being proud of being overweight and having curves. The second track "My Bar" was written based on a conversation Block had in a bar bathroom with a girl about an ex-lover. The final track "Peaked in High School" was written because Block kept receiving phone calls from high school classmates who wanted to reconnect after she became famous. The fourth song on the album "Like a Boy" was described by American Songwriter as a song "about a relationship that fell apart". "Just About Over You" was described by The New York Times as "a smoldering ballad that balanced resentment with determination." "I Know a Girl" features background vocals from singer–songwriter Hillary Lindsey, who also contributed to the song's writing.

== Critical reception ==
Welcome to the Block Party received positive reviews from critics and writers since its release. Joe Caramanica of The New York Times called the album "a refreshing and accomplished pop-country debut album, and an ambitious one, too." Caramanica further explained, "The sheer scale of some of the album’s choruses — on “My Bar,” “Heels in Hand,” “Wish You Were the Whiskey” and others — recalls the power country of the 1990s and early 2000s, when the genre was taking its cues from arena rock, and when its pop ambitions were unfettered. Nothing about this album is shy." Matt Bjorke of Roughstock also positively commented on the album. "These songs are intimately personal while also being universal enough to be relatable to the listeners own life. That’s the key for any artist and something that many artists spend years trying to achieve. Pricilla Block's Welcome To The Block Party is an early favorite for one of our top albums for the year 2022," he concluded.

Dan MacIntosh of Country Standard Time compared Block to the sound of Miranda Lambert, while also calling her "a special talent on this important new album." MacIntosh concluded by pointing out the album's uniqueness to that of country records out" "There's a lot of quality music found on Welcome To The Block Party, all of which Block had a hand in writing. It will be interesting to see how mainstream country handles Block's music. The color barrier is starting to be broken down with new Black talent, like Mickey Guyton and Jimmie Allen. Now, will the body positive movement win a victory in country music with Priscilla Block, the same way Lizzo made similar inroads on pop radio?" Off the Record UK found similar uniqueness in Block's style. "That’s the real power of Block – to infuse sarcasm and sass with real palpable emotion, in a fresh and exciting new sound," they concluded.

== Release and chart performance ==
Welcome to the Block Party was preceded by the release of the single "Just About Over You". It was released on Indent/Mercury Nashville on October 9, 2020. The song later reached the top 15 on the country music charts. The song peaked at number 17 on the Billboard Hot Country Songs chart and number 14 on the Billboard Country Airplay chart. When Block announced the release of the album, she also announced the release of her second single "My Bar". Welcome to the Block Party was officially released by InDent Records and Mercury Nashville on February 11, 2022. It was offered as a compact disc, vinyl LP, and as a digital release. The album peaked at number 39 on the Billboard Top Country Albums chart.

== Track listing ==
Welcome to the Block Party (CD and digital versions)
No.	Title	Writer(s)	Length
1.	"Welcome to the Block Party"	Priscilla Block; Mark Mulch	0:34
2.	"My Bar"	Block; Stone Aielli; Lexie Hayden	3:13
3.	"Heels in Hand"	Block; Robbie Artress; Josh Beale; Kate Hasting; Sarah Jones	3:38
4.	"Like a Boy"	Block; Jones; Emily Kroll	3:43
5.	"I Know a Girl" (featuring Hillary Lindsey)	Block; Lindsey; David Garcia	3:15
6.	"Ever Since You Left"	Block; Jones; Josh Kerr	2:44
7.	"Thick Thighs" (Block Party Version)	Block; Jones; Kroll	2:55
8.	"I Bet You Wanna Know"	Block; Jones; Stone Aielli	2:37
9.	"I've Gotten Good"	Block; Phil Barton; Liz Rose	2:48
10.	"Wish You Were the Whiskey"	Block; Beale; Hasting; Jones	3:08
11.	"Just About Over You" (Radio Edit)	Block; Jones; Kroll	3:08
12.	"Peaked in High School"	Block; Beale; Hasting; Jones	2:39

== Weekly charts ==
Weekly chart performance for Welcome to the Block Party
Chart (2022)	Peak position
US Top Country Albums (Billboard)	39

== Release history ==
Region	Date	Format	Label	Ref.
United States	February 11, 2022	Compact disc; digital download; streaming; vinyl	InDent Records; Mercury Nashville	
