= Alabama Music Hall of Fame =

- Established: July 26, 1990
- Location: Tuscumbia, Alabama
- Coordinates: 34.713117°N 87.706783°W
- Type: Local history museum
- Founders: Muscle Shoals Music Association; Alabama Legislature
- Director: Sandra Burroughs
- Historian: Victoria Mitchell
- Website: www.alamhof.org/history

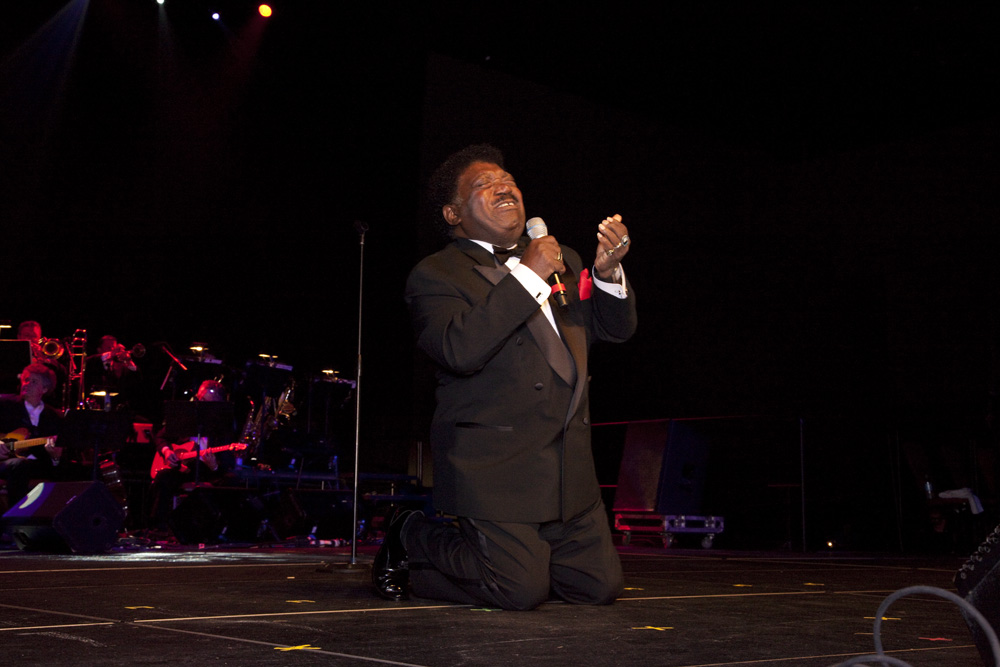
Percy Sledge performing at the Hall of Fame in March 2010.

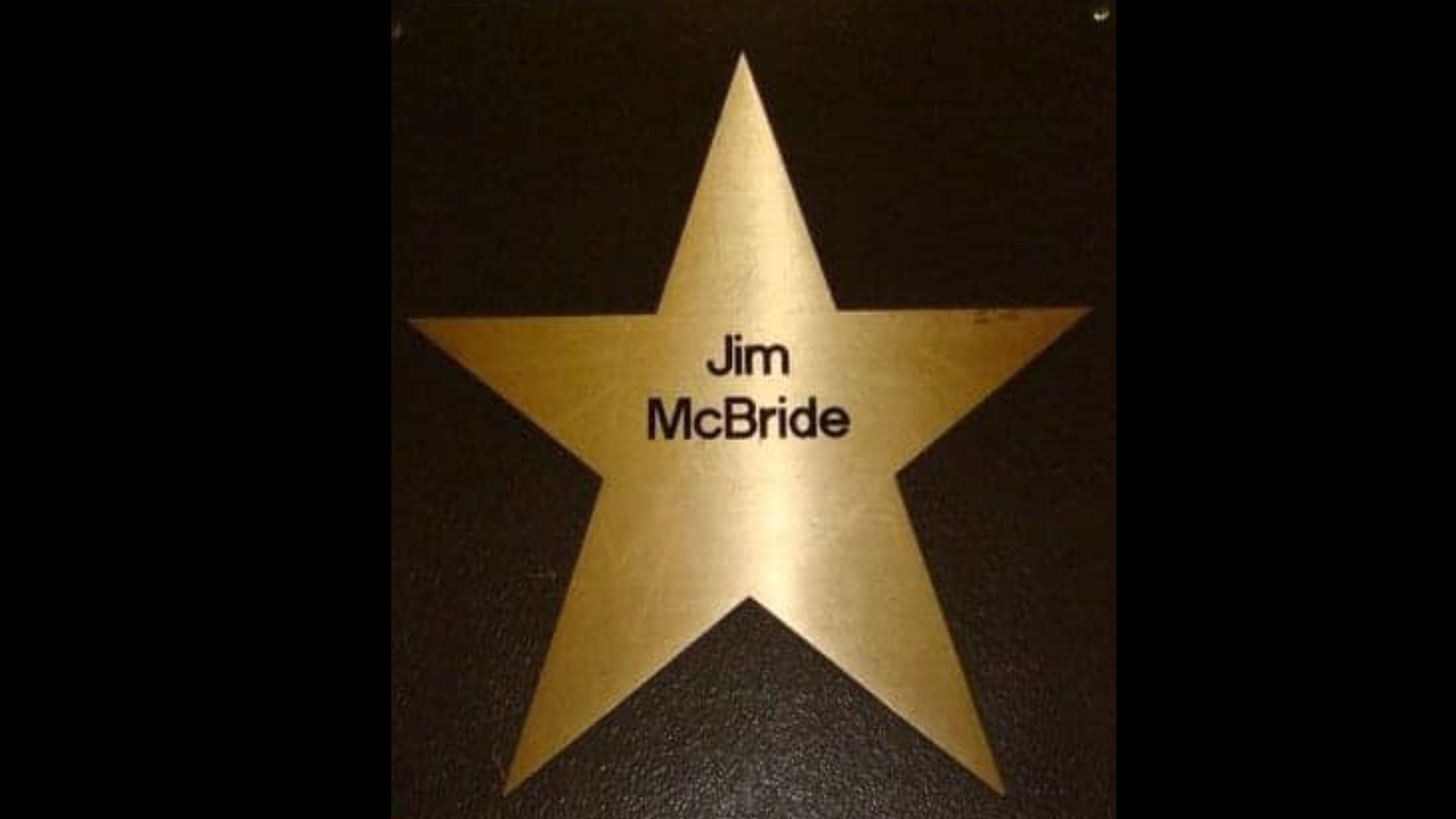
Jim McBride's Alabama Music Hall of Fame Star.

The Alabama Music Hall of Fame, first conceived by the Muscle Shoals Music Association in the early 1980s, was created by the Alabama Music Hall of Fame Board, which then oversaw construction of a 12,500 sq ft (1,160 m^{2}) facility after a statewide referendum in 1987. It is located in the town of Tuscumbia, Alabama.

== Purpose ==
The Alabama Music Hall of Fame serves to showcase Alabamians who have had a significant impact on the music industry. From musicians to songwriters, management, and publishing, The Alabama Music Hall of Fame provides several ways of honoring its "achievers," including informative exhibitions, a bronze star on their Walk of Fame, and the achievers' inclusion in the Hall of Fame roster.

== Inductees ==
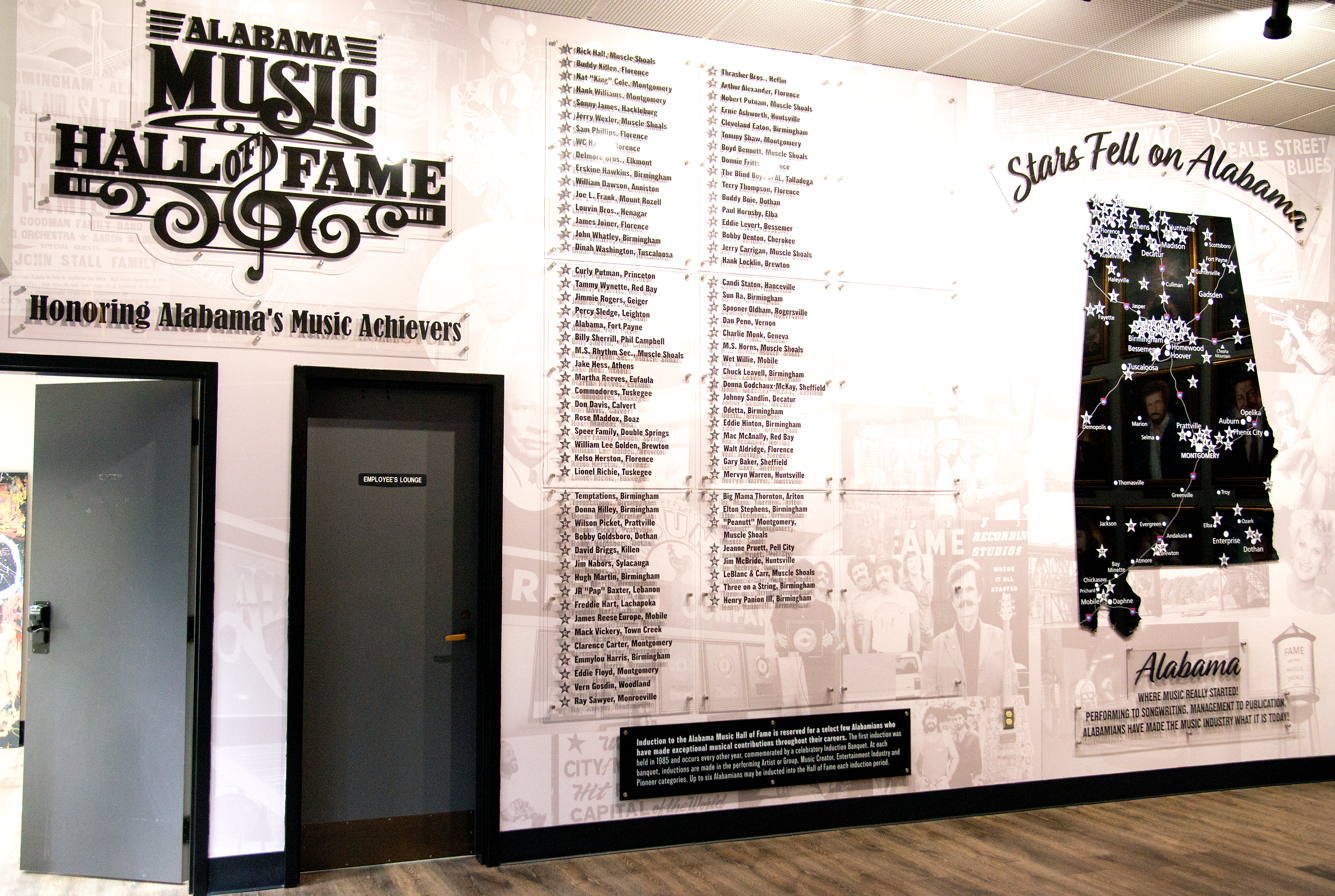
List of Achievers, near the entrance, in 2025

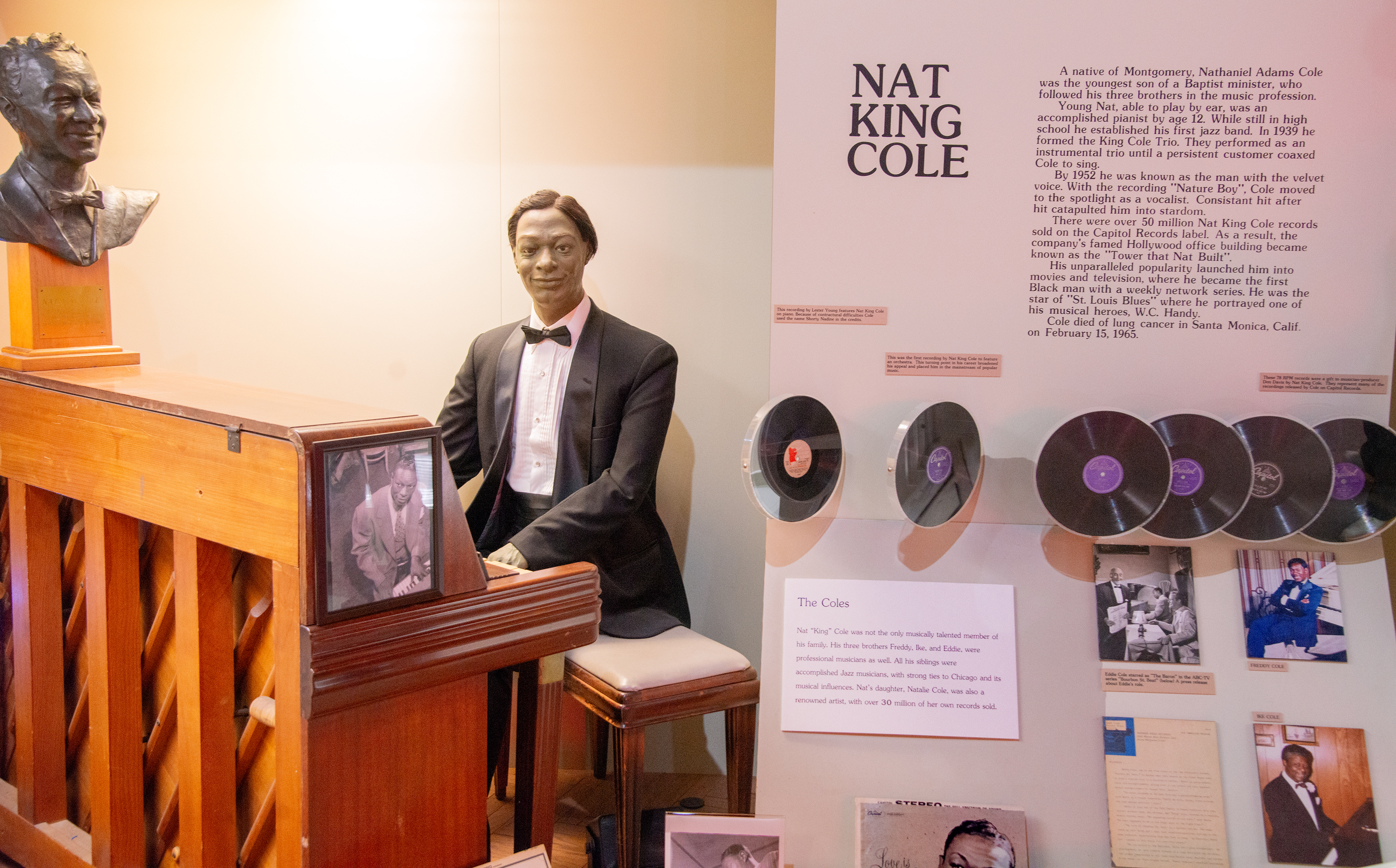
Nat King Cole display, in 2025

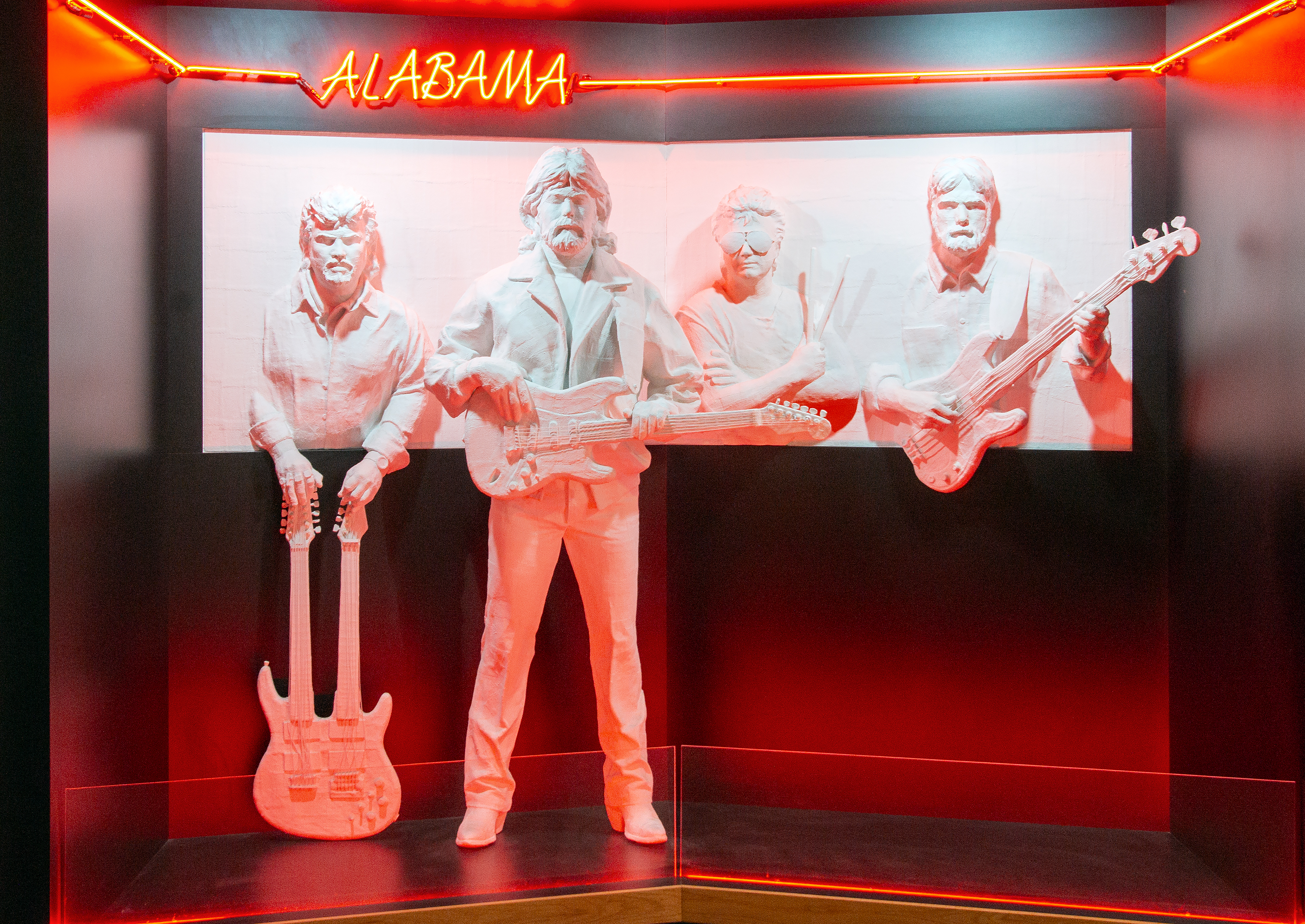
Alabama (band) display, in 2025

Year	Name
1985	Rick Hall
1985	Buddy Killen
1985	Nat "King" Cole
1985	Hank Williams
1987	Sonny James
1987	Jerry Wexler
1987	Sam Phillips
1987	W.C. Handy
1989	Delmore Brothers
1989	Erskine Hawkins
1989	William L. Dawson
1989	Joe L. Frank
1991	Louvin Brothers
1991	James Joiner
1991	John "Fess" Whatley
1991	Dinah Washington
1993	Curly Putman
1993	Tammy Wynette
1993	Jimmie Rodgers
1993	Percy Sledge
1993	Alabama
1995	Billy Sherrill
1995	Muscle Shoals Rhythm Section
1995	Jake Hess
1995	Martha Reeves
1995	Commodores
1997	Don Davis
1997	Rose Maddox
1997	Speer Family
1997	William Lee Golden
1997	Kelso Herston
1997	Lionel Richie
1999	Temptations
1999	Donna Hilley
1999	Wilson Pickett
1999	Bobby Goldsboro
1999	David Briggs
2001	Jim Nabors
2001	Hugh Martin
2001	J.R. "Pap" Baxter
2001	Freddie Hart
2003	James Reese Europe
2003	Clarence Carter
2003	Mack Vickery
2003	Emmylou Harris
2003	Eddie Floyd
2005	Vern Gosdin
2005	Arthur Alexander
2005	Ray Sawyer
2005	Norbert Putnam
2005	The Thrasher Brothers
2008	Ernie Ashworth
2008	Boyd Bennett
2008	Cleveland Eaton
2008	Donnie Fritts
2008	Tommy Shaw
2010	The Blind Boys of Alabama
2010	Terry Thomson
2010	Eddie Levert
2010	Buddy Buie
2010	Bobby Denton
2010	Paul Hornsby
2010	Jerry Carrigan
2014	Hank Locklin
2014	Spooner Oldham
2014	Candi Staton
2014	Dan Penn
2014	Sun Ra
2014	Charlie Monk
2016	Muscle Shoals Horns
2016	Wet Willie
2016	Chuck Leavell
2016	Donna Jean Godchaux-MacKay
2016	Johnny Sandlin
2018	Odetta
2018	Mac McAnally
2018	Eddie Hinton
2018	Walt Aldridge
2020	Mervyn Warren
2020	Big Mama Thornton
2020	Gary Baker
2020	Elton Stephens
2023	Dr. Henry Panion, III
2023	Three on a String
2023	Jeanne Pruett
2023	Jim McBride
2023	Lenny LeBlanc & Pete Carr
2023	Earl “Peanutt” Montgomery

== Plans ==
Both a second and third phase are being planned as future expansions for the Alabama Music Hall of Fame:

- The second addition is going to be a 1500-seat "state of the art" audio-video recording auditorium.
- The third addition is to be a "southern music" research library.

== See also ==
- List of music museums
