= Otto Orlandi =

Italian music producer

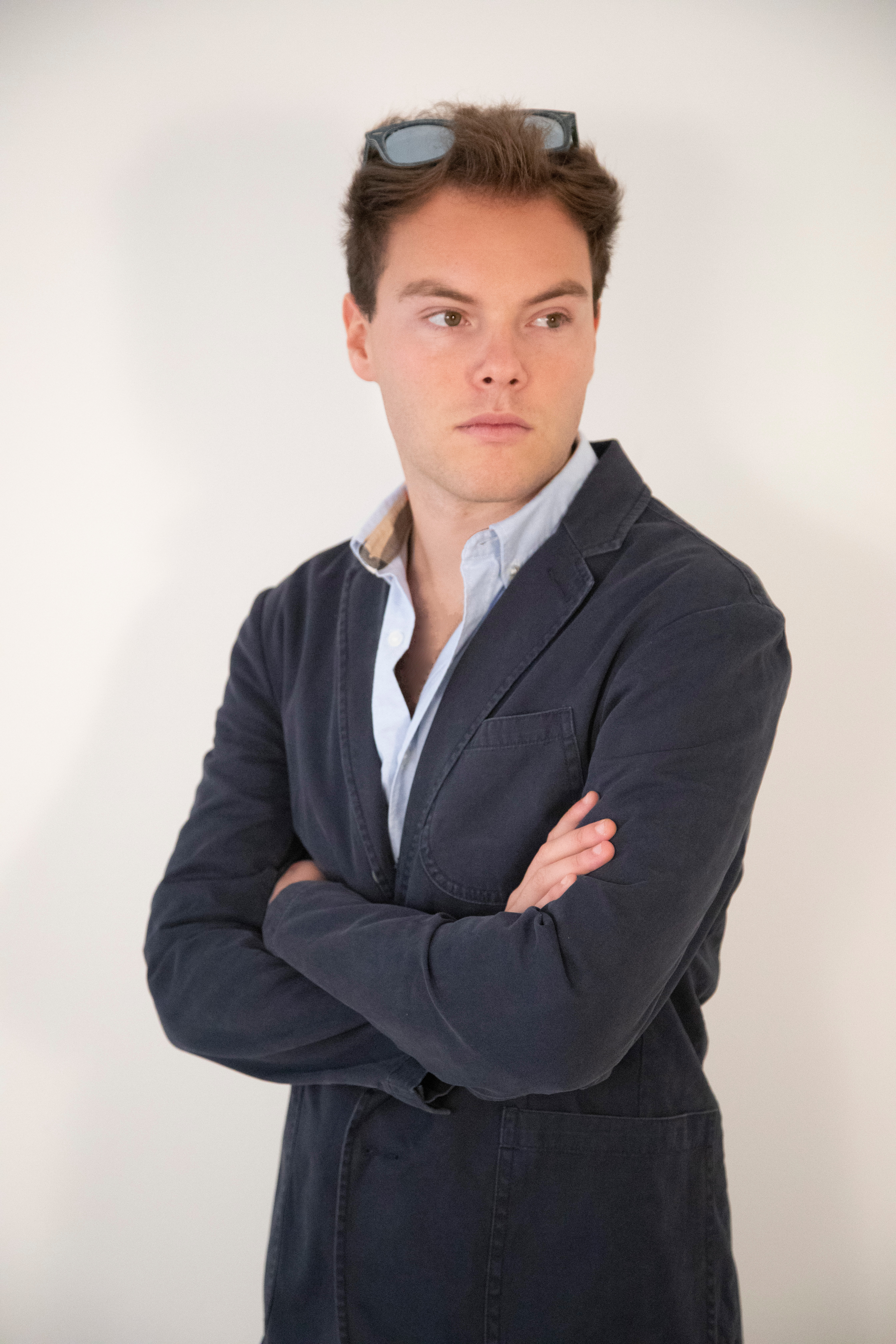

Background information
- Genres: Pop; Dance; EDM
- Occupations: Musician; music producer; ghost producer; sound designer
- Years active: 2012–present
- Labels: Sony Music Entertainment; Armada Music; Blanco y Negro Music; In Charge – Be Yourself Music; Garuda; O Music Recordings
- Website: www.ottoorlandi.com

Ottavio Orlandi, known professionally as Otto Orlandi, is a recording artist, music producer, sound designer, ghost producer and businessperson from Como, Italy. His musical output is a mixture of pop, dance and EDM. His collaborations include "Don't Miss You" and "Seven Days". Additionally, he holds the position of CEO & founder at O Music, a company comprising both recording and management divisions.

== Background ==
Orlandi enrolled at the Music Academy of Como and graduated in sound design.

== Artist career ==
=== Breakthrough ===
In November 2014, Otto Orlandi had his first hit release. "Bells At Midnight" was a collaboration with Thomas Newson and featured vocals from Melanie Fontana. It was released by Marco V's record label in Charge, a sub-label of Dutch label Be Yourself Music. The track was played by some of the world's top DJs including Hardwell on his On Air radio show, by Nicky Romero on his Protocol radio show, by W&W on their Mainstage radio show and by Blasterjaxx. "Bells At Midnight" reached No. 3 on the Beatport Progressive house Top 100 chart and No. 23 on the Beatport overall Top 100.

=== 2016–present ===
Orlandi followed the success of "Bells At Midnight" with his next release "Sail Away". Released in January 2016 by Spanish label Blanco y Negro Music, the track featured vocals written by American songwriter Curtis Richa and performed by Dutch singer-songwriter Allan Eshuijs (under his S-House alias). "Sail Away" was premiered by Nicky Romero on his Protocol radio show and reached No. 9 on the Beatport Progressive house Top 100 chart. Following this release, he signed a publishing deal with MusicAllStars Publishing (a sister company of Spinnin' Records).

In September 2016, Orlandi's collaboration with Fergie DJ titled "Hurts So Good" was released by Gareth Emery's record label Garuda, a sub-label of Dutch label Armada Music. The track was premiered by Don Diablo on his Hexagon radio show. The "Radio Edit" reached 13 on the Nexus Radio Dance Chart and the "Extended Mix" entered the Beatport Electro house Top 100 chart.

Orlandi began 2017 with his second release on the Garuda record label, "The Primitives", a collaboration with Taao Kross. The track received DJ support from David Guetta and Dannic.

Otto Orlandi's best-selling release to date came in February 2017 with the release of "Don't Miss You", through his own O Music Records label. "Don't Miss You" was a collaboration with Swedish duo ManyFew, with vocals from Melanie Fontana. This was the second time Melanie Fontana had appeared on an Otto Orlandi track. The track entered the iTunes Italy Top 10 and peaked at No. 7 while spending a total of 55 days on the top 100. The track went on to record over 2 million plays on Spotify.

In June 2017, Orlandi released "Volcano", featuring ADN. This was his second collaboration with songwriter Curtis Richa. This was followed in July by "Seven Days", his third collaboration with singer and songwriter Melanie Fontana.

== Ghost producer ==
Otto Orlandi has worked as a ghost producer for multiple artists in various genres including mainstream dance music. He has produced music for several artists signed to Sony Music and Universal Music. His ghost producer career has led to him to work at Capitol Records in Los Angeles, Abbey Road Studios in London and X-Level Studios in Stockholm.

== Record label ==
O Music Recordings was founded by Otto Orlandi in 2016 and releases pop and dance music.

== Discography ==
=== Singles ===
| Year | Title | Release details | Certifications |
|---|---|---|---|
| 2023 | Higher (featuring Joshua) | Released: 23 June 2023; Label: O Music Recordings; Format: Download | |
| 2019 | Sadgirl (with Charlie Disney) | Released: 13 September 2019; Label: O Music Recordings; Format: Download | |
| 2019 | You and I (with Mark Voss) | Released: 26 July 2019; Label: O Music Recordings; Format: Download | |
| 2019 | Golden Tears (with FAIET and Thatsimo featuring Sophie C) | Released: 14 June 2019; Label: O Music Recordings; Format: Download | |
| 2018 | Don't Give Me Up (with Molly Marrs) | Released: 26 October 2018; Label: O Music Recordings; Format: Download | |
| 2018 | Oddest Goddess (with The Chordz featuring Ayah Marar) | Released: 18 May 2018; Label: Sony Music Entertainment / O Music Recordings; Format: Download | |
| 2018 | Fever (featuring RAYNE & Karmello) | Released: 30 March 2018; Label: Sony Music Entertainment / O Music Recordings; Format: Download | |
| 2017 | Seven Days (featuring Melanie Fontana) | Released: 24 July 2017; Label: O Music Recordings; Format: Download | |
| 2017 | Volcano (featuring ADN) | Released: 19 June 2017; Label: O Music Recordings; Format: Download | |
| 2017 | Don't Miss You (with ManyFew featuring Melanie Fontana) | Released: 27 February 2017; Label: O Music Recordings; Format: Download | |
| 2017 | The Primitives (with Taao Kross) | Released: 6 January 2017; Label: Garuda; Format: Download | |
| 2016 | Hurts So Good (with Fergie DJ) | Released: 16 September 2016; Label: Garuda; Format: Download | |
| 2016 | Can You Hear Me (with Sabrina Signs) | Released: 15 August 2016; Label: Arcadia Records; Format: Download | |
| 2016 | Dissolution (with VAVO featuring Nathan Brumley) | Released: 29 February 2016; Label: PM Music; Format: Download | |
| 2016 | Sail Away (featuring S-House) | Released: 22 January 2016; Label: Blanco y Negro Music; Format: Download | |
| 2014 | Bells at Midnight (with Thomas Newson featuring Melanie Fontana) | Released: 28 November 2014; Label: InCharge (Be Yourself Music); Format: Download | |
| 2013 | Paan | Released: 20 December 2013; Label: Believe Electro; Format: Download | |
| 2012 | Me And You (with Francesco Balestrini featuring Eleonora Rossi) | Released: 22 November 2012; Label: forBeat; Format: Download | |
