= Cool About It =

2021 song by Meghan Patrick

Single by Meghan Patrick

from the album Heart on My Glass
- Released: October 27, 2021
- Genre: Country
- Length: 3:29
- Label: Warner Canada
- Songwriter(s): Meghan Patrick; Corey Crowder; Cary Barlowe
- Producer(s): Joey Hyde

Meghan Patrick singles chronology
"Never Giving Up on You" (2021)	"Cool About It" (2021)	"You Ain't" (2022)

Music video
- "Cool About It" on YouTube

"Cool About It" is a song co-written and recorded by Canadian-American country artist Meghan Patrick. She wrote the track with Corey Crowder and Cary Barlowe. It was the third single off Patrick's third studio album, Heart on My Glass.

== Background ==
"Cool About It" was one of the first songs Patrick wrote over Zoom during the COVID-19 pandemic. She stated the song was inspired by the idea that "when someone dumps you it doesn’t just break your heart, it kind of breaks your ego and your confidence".

== Accolades ==
Year	Award	Category	Result	Ref
2022	Country Music Association of Ontario	Music Video of the Year	"Cool About It"	Nominated
2022	Country Music Association of Ontario	Single of the Year	"Cool About It"	Nominated
2022	Country Music Association of Ontario	Songwriter(s) of the Year	"Cool About It" (with Cary Barlowe, Corey Crowder)	Nominated

== Music video ==
The official music video for "Cool About It" premiered on October 27, 2021. The video was directed by Sean Hagwell, and was inspired by the James Bond film series and Ocean's 11. Patrick said she wanted to "add more storyline to my songs and make it more of a mini movie than a music video". Hagwell stated he was inspired by the line, "Don’t blow my cover / We ain’t here together". Patrick believed it to be her best music video to date, adding "we may even have to do a sequel or prequel of this storyline for any subsequent singles off this record".

== Chart performance ==
"Cool About It" reached a peak of number ten on the Billboard Canada Country chart dated March 19, 2022, marking Patrick's fifth career top ten hit.

Chart (2022)	Peak position
Canada Country (Billboard)	10
