= Telling All My Secrets =

Studio album by Mitchell Tenpenny
- Released: December 14, 2018
- Genre: Country pop
- Label: Riser House/Columbia Nashville
- Producer: Mitchell Tenpenny; Jordan Schmidt; Sam Sumser; Paul DiGiovanni

Mitchell Tenpenny chronology
Mitchell Tenpenny (2018)	Telling All My Secrets (2018)	Naughty List (2021)

Singles from Telling All My Secrets
- 1. "Drunk Me" Released: March 26, 2018; 2. "Alcohol You Later" Released: February 11, 2019

Telling All My Secrets is the second studio album by American country music singer-songwriter Mitchell Tenpenny, and his major-label debut. It was released through Columbia Nashville and Riser House Records on December 14, 2018. The lead single, "Drunk Me", reached the top 10 on the Billboard Country Airplay chart. Tenpenny co-wrote all eleven tracks on the album. Tenpenny produced the album with Jordan Schmidt except for "Alcohol You Later", which was produced by Sam Sumser, and "I Get the Picture", "Somebody Ain't You", and the title track, which Tenpenny produced with Paul DiGiovanni.

== Commercial performance ==
Telling All My Secrets debuted at number five on Billboard's Top Country Albums chart and number 53 on the Billboard 200, based on 20,000 album equivalent units. On the Billboard 200, it left the top 100 the week of January 5, 2019 and spent eight weeks on the chart. It has sold 31,000 copies in pure album sales in the United States as of July 2019.

== Track listing ==
No.	Title	Writer(s)	Length
1.	"Truck I Drove in High School"	Mitchell Tenpenny; Jordan Schmidt; Andrew Albert; Devin Dawson	3:27
2.	"Alcohol You Later"	Tenpenny; Sam Sumser; Michael Lotten	3:06
3.	"All on You"	Tenpenny; Albert; Nick Fradiani; Schmidt	3:10
4.	"Goner"	Tenpenny; Albert; Schmidt	3:15
5.	"Chance Worth Taking"	Tenpenny; Josh Hoge; Matthew McVaney	3:11
6.	"I Get the Picture"	Tenpenny; Alex Kline; Michael Whitworth	3:32
7.	"Drunk Me"	Tenpenny; Schmidt; Justin Wilson	3:31
8.	"Somebody's Got Me"	Tenpenny; Hillary Lindsey; Schmidt	3:24
9.	"Somebody Ain't You"	Tenpenny; Thomas Archer; Dallas Wilson	2:57
10.	"Telling All My Secrets"	Tenpenny; Jordan Minton; D. Wilson	5:10
11.	"Walk Like Him"	Tenpenny; Justin Ebach; Steven Dale Jones	3:12

Vinyl release / Streaming release
No.	Title	Writer(s)	Length
1.	"Truck I Drove in High School"	Mitchell Tenpenny; Jordan Schmidt; Andrew Albert; Devin Dawson	3:27
2.	"Alcohol You Later"	Tenpenny; Sam Sumser; Michael Lotten	3:06
3.	"All on You"	Tenpenny; Albert; Nick Fradiani; Schmidt	3:10
4.	"Goner"	Tenpenny; Albert; Schmidt	3:15
5.	"Chance Worth Taking"	Tenpenny; Josh Hoge; Matthew McVaney	3:11
6.	"Bitches"	Tenpenny; Dallas Wilson	3:47
7.	"I Get the Picture"	Tenpenny; Alex Kline; Michael Whitworth	3:32
8.	"Drunk Me"	Tenpenny; Schmidt; Justin Wilson	3:47
9.	"Somebody's Got Me"	Tenpenny; Hillary Lindsey; Schmidt	3:24
10.	"Somebody Ain't You"	Tenpenny; Thomas Archer; Dallas Wilson	2:57
11.	"Telling All My Secrets"	Tenpenny; Jordan Minton; D. Wilson	5:10
12.	"Walk Like Him"	Tenpenny; Justin Ebach; Steven Dale Jones	3:12

== Personnel ==
Adapted from AllMusic

- Andy Albert - background vocals
- Tom Beaupre - bass guitar
- Marc Beeson - background vocals
- Devin Dawson - banjo
- Paul DiGiovanni - guitar programming
- Justin Ebach - programming
- Travis Harper - background vocals
- Mark Hill - bass guitar
- Derek Johnson - drums
- Hillary Lindsey - background vocals
- Michael Lotten - acoustic guitar, electric guitar
- Steve Markland - background vocals
- Matthew McVaney - programming
- Garrett Perales - electric guitar
- Jordan Schmidt - programming
- Jimmie Lee Sloas - bass guitar
- Sam Sumser - bass guitar, acoustic guitar, electric guitar, keyboards, programming
- Mitchell Tenpenny - banjo, acoustic guitar, electric guitar, lead vocals, background vocals
- Rafe Tenpenny - background vocals
- Ilya Toshinsky - banjo, dobro, acoustic guitar, electric guitar, mandolin
- Derek Wells - electric guitar
- Dallas Wilson - background vocals
- Lonnie Wilson - drums
- Alex Wright - Fender Rhodes, keyboards, organ, piano, programming, Wurlitzer
- Nir Z. - drums

== Charts ==
=== Album ===
==== Weekly charts ====
Chart (2018)	Peak position
US Billboard 200	53
US Top Country Albums (Billboard)	5

==== Year-end charts ====
Chart (2019)	Position
US Top Country Albums (Billboard)	31
