= Truth About You =

2021 single by Mitchell Tenpenny

Single by Mitchell Tenpenny

from the album This Is the Heavy
- Released: July 9, 2021
- Genre: Country
- Length: 3:23
- Label: Riser House Entertainment; Columbia Nashville
- Songwriter(s): Matt Alderman; Mitchell Tenpenny; Thomas Archer
- Producer(s): Mitchell Tenpenny; Jordan Schmidt

Mitchell Tenpenny singles chronology
"Broken Up" (2020)	"Truth About You" (2021)	"At the End of a Bar" (2021)

Music video
- "Truth About You" on YouTube

"Truth About You" is a song by American country music singer Mitchell Tenpenny. It was released on July 9, 2021 as the lead single from his second studio album This Is the Heavy. Tenpenny co-wrote the song with Matt Alderman and Thomas Archer, and produced it with Jordan Schmidt.

== Background ==
Tenpenny first revealed the song on TikTok in July 2021. The song went on to gain over 2.5 million streams in the first three days. He stated in a press release: "I have the best and most reactive fans. Their instantaneous feedback is invaluable to me as an artist. There is nothing more gratifying than making music for them."

== Content ==
In a radio interview with Taste of Country Nights, Tenpenny stated that the song is about an "ex-[girlfriend]", "experiences his friends have gone through" and his "own bad behavior in relationships".

== Music video ==
The music video was released on September 1, 2021, and directed by Dustin Haney. It was filmed at Bobby’s Idle Hour bar and Warren Studios in Nashville, Tennessee.

== Charts ==
=== Weekly charts ===
Weekly chart performance for "Truth About You"
Chart (2021–2022)	Peak position
Canada Country (Billboard)	23
Canada Digital Songs (Billboard)	37
US Billboard Hot 100	54
US Country Airplay (Billboard)	2
US Hot Country Songs (Billboard)	11

=== Year-end charts ===
2021 year-end chart performance for "Truth About You"
Chart (2021)	Position
US Hot Country Songs (Billboard)	99

2022 year-end chart performance for "Truth About You"
Chart (2022)	Position
US Country Airplay (Billboard)	24
US Hot Country Songs (Billboard)	35
US Radio Songs (Billboard)	62

== Certifications ==
Certifications for "Truth About You"
Region	Certification	Certified units/sales
Australia (ARIA)	Gold	35,000^{‡}
Canada (Music Canada)	Platinum	80,000^{‡}
United States (RIAA)	Platinum	1,000,000^{‡}
^{‡} Sales+streaming figures based on certification alone.

== Release history ==
Release history for "Truth About You"
Region	Date	Format	Label	Ref.
Various	July 9, 2021	Digital download; streaming	Columbia Nashville	
United States	August 16, 2021	Country radio	Columbia Nashville	
