= Grace & Grit =

Studio album by Meghan Patrick
- Released: April 29, 2016
- Genre: Country
- Length: 48:39
- Label: Warner Music Canada
- Producer: Chris Baseford; Vince Gill; Chad Kroeger; Carly McKillip; Justin Niebank

Meghan Patrick chronology
Grace & Grit (2016)	Country Music Made Me Do It (2018)

Singles from Grace & Grit
- 1. "Bow Chicka Wow Wow" Released: February 26, 2016; 2. "Grace & Grit" Released: June 3, 2016; 3. "Still Loving You" Released: November 7, 2016; 4. "Be Country with Me" Released: April 17, 2017

Grace & Grit is the debut studio album by Canadian country music artist Meghan Patrick. It was released on April 29, 2016, via Warner Music Canada. It includes the singles "Bow Chicka Wow Wow", "Grace & Grit", and "Still Loving You". The title track was the third highest-charting single by a Canadian female country singer in 2016, reaching number 12 on the Canada Country chart.

== Track listing ==
No.	Title	Writer(s)	Length
1.	"Grace & Grit"	Phil Barton; Patricia Conroy; Meghan Patrick	3:04
2.	"Bow Chicka Wow Wow"	Chad Kroeger; Patrick	3:27
3.	"Still Loving You" (featuring Joe Nichols)	Zach Abend; Conroy; Patrick	4:10
4.	"Long Way from Waylon"	Gord Bamford; Phil O'Donnell; Buddy Owens; Patrick	3:48
5.	"I Won't Drink"	Marty Dodson; Patrick; Bruce Wallace	3:42
6.	"Be Country with Me"	Lila McCann; Patrick; Wallace	3:55
7.	"I Believe in Beer"	Rodney Clawson; Patrick	4:16
8.	"Thanks to You"	Dodson; Patrick; Wallace	3:30
9.	"Breaking Records"	Ashley Gorley; Luke Laird; Hillary Lindsey	3:53
10.	"Nothin' but a Song"	Andrea England; Hill Kourkoutis; Patrick; Chris Perry	2:57
11.	"Forever Ain't Enough Time"	Andrew Allan; Anthony Anderson; Patrick; Steve Smith	4:10
12.	"Who Knew"	Chantal Kreviazuk; Patrick	4:08
13.	"Kiss Me Already"	Barton; Patrick	3:36

Walmart exclusive bonus tracks
No.	Title	Length
14.	"Fast as Your Car"	3:23
15.	"Love Won't Let Me"	2:53

== Chart performance ==
=== Album ===
Chart (2016)	Peak position
Canadian Albums (Billboard)	26

=== Singles ===
Year	Single	Peak positions
Year	Single	CAN Country
2016	"Bow Chicka Wow Wow"	17
2016	"Grace & Grit"	12
2016	"Still Loving You"	10
2017	"Be Country with Me"	11
