= Country Music Made Me Do It =

Studio album by Meghan Patrick
- Released: January 12, 2018
- Genre: Country
- Length: 38:51
- Label: Warner Music Canada
- Producer: Jeremy Stover

Meghan Patrick chronology
Grace & Grit (2016)	Country Music Made Me Do It (2018)

Singles from Country Music Made Me Do It
- 1. "Country Music Made Me Do It" Released: October 27, 2017; 2. "The Bad Guy" Released: April 13, 2018; 3. "Walls Come Down" Released: August 2018

Country Music Made Me Do It is the second studio album recorded by Canadian country music artist Meghan Patrick. It was released January 12, 2018 through Warner Music Canada. The album entered the Canadian Albums Chart at number 31.

== Critical reception ==
Marlo Ashley of Exclaim! rated the album 9 out of 10, writing that it "is a culmination and maturation of Patrick's capabilities and talent," and that it "unites an assortment of musical intricacies beautifully." Zack Kephart of The Shotgun Seat wrote that Country Music Made Me Do It is "a smart, wonderfully produced album," and an example of "contemporary country music done right."

== Commercial performance ==
Country Music Made Me Do It debuted and peaked at number 31 on the Canadian Albums Chart dated January 27, 2018. Though it peaked five positions lower than Grace & Grit (2016), the album spent a second week on the chart, at number 84, while its predecessor only spent a single week in the top 100.

== Singles ==
"Country Music Made Me Do It" was released October 27, 2017 as the record's lead single. It entered the Canada Country airplay chart at number 47 in November 2017 and later peaked at number 5 in March 2018, becoming Patrick's first top five entry.

"The Bad Guy" was released April 13, 2018 as the album's second official single. "Walls Come Down" was released as the third single, and became her first Number One hit on the Canada Country charts for the week dated December 22, 2018.

== Track listing ==
No.	Title	Writer(s)	Length
1.	"Country Music Made Me Do It"	Meghan Patrick; Jeremy Stover; Dan Isbell	3:20
2.	"George Strait"	Patrick; Kelly Archer; Adam Hambrick	3:03
3.	"Walls Come Down"	Patrick; Archer; Justin Weaver	3:25
4.	"The Bad Guy"	Patrick; Archer; Nathan Spicer	3:45
5.	"Small Town"	Patrick; April Geesbreght; Jason Massey	3:30
6.	"The Buzz"	Patrick; Archer; Weaver	3:01
7.	"Feel Me Gone"	Archer; Ella Mae Bowen; Autumn McIntire	3:04
8.	"Hardest on My Heart"	Patrick; Archer; Weaver	2:57
9.	"We Got It All"	Patrick; Stover; Jason Gantt	3:11
10.	"Case of Beer and a Bed"	Patrick; Deric Ruttan; JT Harding	2:55
11.	"The Way You Apologize"	Patrick; Rodney Clawson	3:39
12.	"Underrated"	Patrick; Gavin Slate; Travis Wood	3:01
Total length:			38:51

== Credits and personnel ==
- Kelly Archer – background vocals
- Kris Donegan – acoustic guitar
- David Dorn – keyboards
- Adam Hambrick – background vocals
- Julian King – engineering, recording
- Jason Kyle – engineering
- Chris Lord-Alge – mixing
- Tony Lucido – bass
- Miles McPherson – drums
- Andrew Mendelson – mastering
- Meghan Patrick – lead vocals
- Jeremy Stover – production
- Derek Wells – electric guitar

== Charts ==
Chart (2018)	Peak position
Canadian Albums (Billboard)	31
