= Donna Hilley =

American music publishing executive

- Born: Donna Jean Whitten; June 30, 1940; Montevallo, Alabama, U.S.
- Died: June 20, 2012 (aged 71); Nashville, Tennessee, U.S.
- Occupation: Music publishing executive
- Employer: Sony/ATV Music Publishing
- Relatives: Mitchell Tenpenny (grandson)

Donna Jean Hilley (née Whitten; June 30, 1940 – June 20, 2012) was an American music publishing executive who was CEO of Sony/ATV Music Publishing from 1994 to her retirement in 2005. Originally from Birmingham, Alabama, Hilley began her career at WKDA in Nashville and went on to work in country music publishing.

A graduate of Jones Valley High School in Birmingham, Hilley was inducted into the Alabama Music Hall of Fame in 1999. She had been married to her high school sweetheart from Birmingham for over 40 years.

== Early life ==
Hilley was born in Montevallo, Alabama. Her father, John Truman Whitten, was a lineman for the Alabama Power Company. Her mother, Janie Mae Whitten (née Sizemore) was a stay at home mom when Donna was born at home after a long difficult labor (many births occurred at home in the rural South in those days). Her parents came from very poor psychosocial situation, and Donna's parents had moved up the socioeconomic ladder only a bit. Her brother, Jimmy Whitten, was born 5 years later, and a sister Diane Whitten, was born 14 years later. By this time the family had moved to Birmingham for her dad's job.

Hilley married her high school boyfriend and moved to Nashville (he was at Vanderbilt) immediately after high school. Though armed with only a high school degree and no experience, she began working at a radio station in Nashville. Two young girls, Vickie and Debbie, were born soon after. The couple was quite poor. With a husband in school and Hilley at a low paying but fun job, the money was scarce.

== Career ==
Hilley followed one of the disc jockeys from WKDA into his advertising firm, Bill Hudson and Associates. She moved up the hierarchy in that position. Several years later her previous boss at the radio station had also been running a music publishing company, Tree. When Mr Stapp ( owner of Tree ) called Hilley to say his secretary had taken ill and had stated only one person could do her job, and that person was Donna Hilley, Donna moved over to Tree Publishing. The position was "executive assistant" to Jack Stapp. Hilley worked her way up to president and CEO later of Tree Publishing.

== Personal life ==
Hilley's grandson, Mitchell Tenpenny, is a country music singer-songwriter.

Hilley often fibbed about her age and The Tennessean reported that she was 65 when she died, although she was actually about to turn 72.
