= Drunk Me =

Single by Mitchell Tenpenny

from the album Telling All My Secrets
- Released: March 26, 2018
- Genre: Country pop
- Length: 3:33
- Label: Riser House/Columbia Nashville
- Songwriters: Mitchell Tenpenny; Jordan Schmidt; Justin Wilson
- Producers: Mitchell Tenpenny; Jordan Schmidt

Mitchell Tenpenny singles chronology
"Love & Rock N' Roll" (2015)	"Drunk Me" (2018)	"Alcohol You Later" (2019)

Music video
- "Drunk Me" on YouTube

"Drunk Me" is a song recorded by American country music singer Mitchell Tenpenny. It was released on March 26, 2018, by Riser House and Columbia Nashville as the debut single from his first studio album Telling All My Secrets (2018). Tenpenny and Jordan Schmidt wrote and produced the song, with Justin Wilson also serving as co-writer. The song is about a man trying to move away from a failed relationship by drinking alcohol. "Drunk Me" peaked at numbers two and six on both the Billboard Country Airplay and Hot Country Songs charts respectively. It also reached number 39 on the Hot 100, giving Tenpenny his only top 40 hit to date. The song was certified 2× Platinum by the Recording Industry Association of America (RIAA), and has sold 210,000 copies as of April 2019. It achieved similar chart prominence in Canada, reaching number two on the Country chart and number 60 on the Canadian Hot 100. Despite not charting in Australia, it received a Gold certification from the Australian Recording Industry Association (ARIA), denoting sales of 35,000 units in that country. An accompanying music video for the single, directed by Justin Key, features Tenpenny in a flooded house.

== Content ==
The song is a recollection of a male narrator's attempts to recover emotionally from a failed relationship, and doing so while drinking alcohol, claiming that "drunk me can't get over you." Tenpenny said that the rest of the song had mostly been written, but that he and his co-writers could not come up with a suitable hook until Jordan Schmidt got up to use the restroom and then returned with the phrase "drunk me". He stated in an interview with iHeartRadio that "People say you go and drink them off your mind. I think that's not what happens...So the concept came around that idea. I quit drinking so I could finally get over you."

== Commercial performance ==
"Drunk Me" is Tenpenny's first top ten hit on the Billboard Country Airplay chart, and it reached number two on the chart dated December 15, 2018 with the biggest gain in airplay that week. It also peaked at number six on the Hot Country Songs chart the same week. On the Billboard Hot 100, it debuted at number 100 the week of August 11 before leaving the next week. It peaked at number 39 the week of January 12, 2019 before leaving completely, spending twenty-one weeks on that chart. On February 26, 2025, the song was certified four-times platinum by the RIAA for moving four million units in sales and streams, and has sold 210,000 copies in the United States as of April 2019.

In Canada, the single debuted at number 95 on the Canadian Hot 100 the week of October 20, 2018. Thirteen weeks later, it peaked at number 60 before leaving the chart three weeks afterwards. It reappeared at number 100 the week of February 23 before leaving completely, remaining on the chart for eighteen weeks.

== Music video ==
Justin Key directed the song's music video. It features Tenpenny inside a house that gets flooded, representing the "flood of emotions" that the song's narrator receives.

== Live performance ==
On August 2, 2018, Tenpenny performed "Drunk Me" on KTLA Morning News after being interviewed.

== Charts ==
=== Weekly charts ===
Chart (2018–2019)	Peak position
Canada (Canadian Hot 100)	60
Canada Country (Billboard)	2
US Billboard Hot 100	39
US Country Airplay (Billboard)	2
US Hot Country Songs (Billboard)	6

=== Year-end charts ===
Chart (2018)	Position
US Country Airplay (Billboard)	49
US Hot Country Songs (Billboard)	50
Chart (2019)	Position
US Hot Country Songs (Billboard)	57

== Certifications ==
Region	Certification	Certified units/sales
Australia (ARIA)	Platinum	70,000^{‡}
Canada (Music Canada)	2× Platinum	160,000^{‡}
United States (RIAA)	4× Platinum	4,000,000^{‡}
^{‡} Sales+streaming figures based on certification alone.
