= Golden Child (album) =

2024 studio album by Meghan Patrick

Studio album by Meghan Patrick
- Released: October 11, 2024
- Genre: Country
- Label: Riser House
- Producer: Ross Copperman; Billy Dawson; Aaron Eshuis; Joey Hyde; Karen Kosowski; Jake Mitchell

Meghan Patrick chronology
Heart on My Glass (2021)	Golden Child (2024)

Singles from Golden Child
- 1. "Golden Child" Released: September 6, 2024; 2. "Stone Alone" Released: July 14, 2025; 3. "Safe Place to Break" Released: January 26, 2026

Golden Child is the fourth studio album by Canadian-American country music artist Meghan Patrick. It was released on October 11, 2024, through Riser House. The album's title track was released as its lead single on September 6, 2024, and became her first solo charting single in the United States.

== Background ==
After three albums released in Canada via Warner Music Canada, Patrick signed a record deal with Riser House, and Golden Child was her first album to be issued in the United States.

== Content ==
Patrick co-wrote 17 of the 18 tracks on Golden Child, with the exception being a cover of No Doubt's "Just a Girl". Karen Kosowski produced the majority of the record, though additional production credits include Ross Copperman, Billy Dawson, Aaron Eshuis, Joey Hyde, and Jake Mitchell. Patrick referred to the album's opening track, "Blood from a Stone", which was inspired by severing a toxic relationship with her mother, as the most important song on the project. Patrick's husband Mitchell Tenpenny serves as inspiration across several tracks on the record, including "The Sweet Spot (Mitchell's Song)" and "Letting Go of You".

== Track listing ==
Golden Child track listing
No.	Title	Writer(s)	Producer	Length
1.	"Blood from a Stone"	Meghan Patrick; Karen Kosowski; Emma-Lee	Kosowski	3:19
2.	"Whether You Love Me or Not"	Patrick; Kosowski; Emma-Lee	Kosowski	3:28
3.	"The Boy Who Cried Drunk (The Demo)"	Patrick; Billy Dawson; Jacob Hackworth	Dawson	3:19
4.	"Other People"	Patrick; Nicolette Hayford; Daniel Ross	Kosowski	3:15
5.	"What Shoulder"	Patrick; Trannie Anderson; Ella Langley; Dallas Wilson	Kosowski	2:56
6.	"Every Dog"	Patrick; Kelly Archer; Ben Goldsmith	Kosowski	3:26
7.	"Good Tastin' Whiskey"	Patrick; Andy Albert; Tyler Hubbard; Jordan Schmidt	Kosowski	3:08
8.	"Other Side of 25"	Patrick; Jake Mitchell; Melissa Peirce	Aaron Eshuis; Joey Hyde	3:00
9.	"Stoned Alone" (featuring Caitlyn Smith)	Patrick; Smith; Ben Williams	Kosowski	3:33
10.	"Golden Child"	Patrick; Eshuis; Hyde	Eshuis; Hyde	3:37
11.	"Why Couldn't I Cry"	Patrick; Ross Copperman; Smith; Williams	Kosowski	3:26
12.	"Iron Man"	Patrick; Copperman; Natalie Hemby; Williams	Kosowski	3:23
13.	"Dying Alone"	Patrick; Devin Dawson; Sam Martinez	Kosowski	4:11
14.	"Letting Go of You"	Patrick; Victoria Banks; Kosowski; Emma-Lee	Kosowski	3:19
15.	"God and a Good Man"	Patrick; Anderson; Wilson	Eshuis; Hyde	4:56
16.	"The Sweet Spot (Mitchell's Song)"	Patrick; Kosowski; Emma-Lee	Kosowski	3:41
17.	"Just a Girl"	Tom Dumont; Gwen Stefani	Kosowski	3:25
18.	"This Town"	Patrick; Copperman; Lauren Hungate; Mitchell	Copperman; Mitchell	3:30
Total length:				1:03:00

Golden Child (The Final Chapter)
No.	Title	Writer(s)	Length
19.	"Jessica, Jezebel"	Patrick; Kosowski; Emma-Lee	3:21
20.	"Project"	Patrick; Kat Higgins; Jake Rose	3:24
21.	"Safe Place to Break"	Patrick; Zach Kale; Shane Minor	3:52
22.	"Both Can Be True"	Patrick; Anderson; Michael Whitworth; Wilson	3:30
23.	"You for Me"	Patrick; Jon Decious; Paul Sikes	3:32
24.	"Hold on Meg"	Patrick; Hemby; Kosowski	3:09
Total length:			1:23:00

== Accolades ==
Year	Association	Category	Nominated work	Result	Ref
2025	Country Music Association of Ontario	Album of the Year	Golden Child	Nominated	
2025	Canadian Country Music Association	Album of the Year	Golden Child	Nominated	
2025	Canadian Country Music Association	Innovative Campaign of the Year	"Golden Child: The Making Of"	Nominated	
2025	Canadian Country Music Association	Musical Collaboration of the Year	"Stoned Alone"	Nominated	
