= Joseph Frank (promoter) =

American music promoter

J.L. Frank
- Born: Joseph Lee Frank; April 15, 1900; Mount Rozell, Alabama, US
- Died: May 4, 1952 (aged 52); Dallas, Texas, US
- Years active: 1923–1952
- Known for: Early country music promoter
- Spouse: Maria (1925–1952, his death)
- Children: Gus, Marie, Lydia, Henrietta, and Louis
- Awards: Country Music Hall of Fame, 1967; Alabama Music Hall of Fame, 1989

Joseph Lee (J.L.) Frank (April 15, 1900 – May 4, 1952) was an American music promoter known for his promotion of country music artists during the second quarter of the 20th century. He was inducted into the Country Music Hall of Fame and Museum in 1967.

== Early life ==
Frank was born in Mount Rozell, Alabama in Limestone County, but grew up across the state line in Giles County, Tennessee in the town of Pulaski after both of his parents died by the age of 7. As a young man, Frank worked in the steel mills of Birmingham before moving up to the coal mines in Illinois.

== Start of promotional career ==
At 23, Frank moved to Chicago and worked as a bellboy for the Edgewater Beach Hotel. While working in Illinois, Frank owned a dry cleaners in Evanston, Illinois and had a night job as a theater set mover. Following his wife's persuasion, he became a booking agent for radio stars such as Fibber McGee and Molly, Gene Autry, and Amos 'n' Andy. This was for the WLS Roundup, where he was a show producer starting in 1928. Despite this, Frank still drove a dry-cleaning truck to supplement his income. By 1935, Frank quit both the radio and the dry cleaning job in Chicago, and moved his base of operations from Chicago to Louisville, Kentucky where was now managing Autry prior to the star's move to Hollywood. Other acts that Frank managed while in Louisville included fiddler Clayton McMichen and Frankie More & His Log Cabin Boys. While managing Autry, Frank promoted the idea of the singing cowboy that would also include Pee Wee King, a future member of the Grand Ole Opry who was also Frank's son-in-law. It was while working with King, who was inducted into the Opry in 1937 that Frank began to work in country music, and eventually move his base of operations to Nashville by 1939.

== Move to Nashville and country promoter ==
While promoting King on a tour in Knoxville, Tennessee in 1937, Frank befriended Roy Acuff. Using the same promotional techniques that admitted King into the Opry that year, Frank would get Acuff admitted into the Opry in 1938. Frank also suggested to Acuff to change his band's name from the Crazy Tennesseans to the nobler-sounding Smoky Mountain Boys. The success of inducting both Acuff and King into the Grand Ole Opry made Frank determined to promote Opry acts from small-town theaters and schools to big-city auditoriums within the United States. Frank also created the "package show" which described a touring country music stage show that featured several performers. The promotions were also used to change country music from its original name of "hillbilly", a term that Frank detested. Frank also assembled similar package shows for the Camel Caravan as part of offering free shows to the United States military both at home and in Central America. The early careers of both Eddy Arnold and Minnie Pearl were assisted greatly by Frank. Ernest Tubb also had his career helped through Frank's promotion. By this time of his career in the late 1940s and early 1950s, Frank would be known as the "Flo Ziegfeld of Country Music."

Frank would also lend a helping hand to many young musicians both in business and personal matters. This would even include and feeding budding country music stars at the Frank's house, which was also helped by his interest in vegetable gardening. Opry veteran Alton Delmore of The Delmore Brothers described Frank as "a clean-cut, neat fellow, with a little mustache, and a big Texas hat ... He always had his heart in his work, and he always had a good word for the down-and-out musician ... He was an excellent promoter and he knew just what he wanted and he always got it."

== Songwriting activities ==
Frank also wrote the songs "Chapel on the Hill", "Sundown and Sorrow" (cowrote with King. Recorded by Hank Williams), and "My Main Trail is Yet to Come" (also with King and also recorded by Williams).

== Death ==
Frank was on a business trip in Dallas when he became ill and died there in 1952 from a strep infection.

== Legacy ==
Frank would be inducted posthumously into the Country Music Hall of Fame in 1967. Joining Frank that same year in the Country Music Hall of Fame were Red Foley, Jim Reeves, and Stephen H. Sholes.

In 1989, Frank was posthumously inducted into the Alabama Music Hall of Fame.
