= Never Giving Up on You =

2021 song by Meghan Patrick

Single by Meghan Patrick

from the album Heart on My Glass
- Released: March 25, 2021
- Genre: Country
- Length: 2:56
- Label: Warner Canada; Riser House
- Songwriters: Meghan Patrick; Karen Kosowski; Victoria Banks
- Producer: Jeremy Stover

Meghan Patrick singles chronology
"My First Car" (2020)	"Never Giving Up on You" (2021)	"Cool About It" (2021)

Music video
- "Never Giving Up on You" on YouTube

"Never Giving Up on You" is a song co-written and recorded by Canadian country artist Meghan Patrick. The song was co-written with Victoria Banks and Karen Kosowski. It was the second single from Patrick's third studio album, Heart on My Glass.

== Background ==
Patrick remarked that it was always difficult for her to write "authentic and real" love songs. She felt that in the year prior to writing the song, she had learned more about love. She stated "true love is knowing this about yourself, but realizing you’ve found the one thing (or person) you will never give up on, no matter how hard it gets". Patrick released the song the day after her thirty-fourth birthday.

== Critical reception ==
Front Porch Music called the track "amazing", saying it would be "truly be embedded in your mind and soul". Complete Country stated that Patrick "knocked this one out of the park".

== Music video ==
The official music video for "Never Giving Up On You" features Patrick as well as two actors portraying a couple in a long-lasting romance. It was directed by Sean Hagwell and premiered on April 29, 2021.

== Chart performance ==
"Never Giving Up on You" reached a peak of number 13 on the Billboard Canada Country chart dated July 17, 2021, marking Patrick's tenth career Top 20 hit.

Chart (2021)	Peak position
Canada Country (Billboard)	13
