= Walls Come Down =

2018 song by Meghan Patrick

Single by Meghan Patrick

from the album Country Music Made Me Do It
- Released: August 2018
- Genre: Country rock
- Length: 3:25
- Label: Warner Canada
- Songwriters: Meghan Patrick; Kelly Archer; Justin Weaver
- Producer: Jeremy Stover

Meghan Patrick singles chronology
"The Bad Guy" (2018)	"Walls Come Down" (2018)	"Wild as Me" (2019)

Music video
- "Walls Come Down" on YouTube

"Walls Come Down" is a song co-written and recorded by Canadian country artist Meghan Patrick. The song was co-written with Kelly Archer and Justin Weaver. It was the third single from Patrick's second studio album Country Music Made Me Do It, and her first #1 hit on the Billboard Canada Country chart.

== Commercial performance ==
"Walls Come Down" reached a peak of #1 on the Billboard Canada Country chart for the week of December 22, 2018, marking her first number one hit. Prior to the song hitting Number One, Patrick received an outpouring of support from artists in the Canadian country music community including Brett Kissel, Paul Brandt, and the Washboard Union, as they were eager to see Patrick claim her first chart-topper, and see the song join Lindsay Ell's "Criminal" as the first pair of songs from Canadian female artists to hit number one in the same year since 1999. Patrick was also the seventh different Canadian artist to hit number one on Canadian country radio in 2018, an all-time record since Nielsen began tracking in 1995.

== Music video ==
The official music video for "Walls Come Down" stars Meghan Patrick and actress Tracy Déchaux. It was directed by Stephano Barberis and premiered on September 9, 2018.

== Charts ==
Chart (2018)	Peak position
Canada Country (Billboard)	1
