= O Music Recordings =

- Founded: 2016
- Founder: Otto Orlandi
- Genre: Pop; Dance
- Country of origin: Italy, United Arab Emirates
- Location: Milan, Dubai
- Official website: www.omusicrecs.com

O Music Recordings is an Italian independent record label that releases pop and dance music. Their headquarters are located in Milan. The label was founded in 2016 by Otto Orlandi. In 2018, the label began a partnership with Sony Music.

== Label History ==
In 2016, Otto Orlandi launched the O Music Recordings label primarily in order to have full creative control over the release and handling of his own music productions. The label's first release came in February 2017 with "Don't Miss You".

=== Don't Miss You ===
The label's most successful release to date is "Don't Miss You", a collaboration between Orlandi and ManyFew, featuring vocals from Melanie Fontana. The original mix of "Don't Miss You" reached #7 in the iTunes Italy chart and spent 55 days in total in the top 100. It also spent a total of 8 weeks in the Spotify Italy Top 200 weekly chart, peaking at #72, and entered the Spotify Italy Viral 50 daily chart at #31. As of 27 Jan 2019, the track has been streamed over 2.6 million times on Spotify. Orlandi and Fontana released a follow-up single in July 2017 on O Music Recordings titled "Seven Days". At the end of 2018 the track had received close to 1 million plays on Spotify.

=== Sony Music Partnership ===
To date, O Music Recordings has released 2 singles, both by Orlandi, in partnership with Sony Music: "Fever" (featuring RAYNE and Karmello) and "Oddest Goddess" (with The Chordz featuring Ayah Marar).

== Current Artists ==
- Adn
- Ayah Marar
- The Chordz
- Faiet
- Karmello
- ManyFew
- Mark Voss
- Melanie Fontana
- Molly Marrs
- Otto Orlandi
- RAYNE
- Sophie C
- Thatsimo

== Label Discography ==
List of music released by O Music Recordings
| Year | Title | Artist | Details |
|---|---|---|---|
| 2019 | Sadgirl | Otto Orlandi & Charlie Disney | Released: September 13; Type: Single; Format: Download, stream; Catalogue: OMR009 |
| 2019 | You and I | Otto Orlandi & Mark Voss | Released: July 26; Type: Single; Format: Download, stream; Catalogue: OMR008 |
| 2019 | Golden Tears (featuring Sophie C) | Otto Orlandi, Faiet & Thatsimo | Released: June 14; Type: Single; Format: Download, stream; Catalogue: OMR007 |
| 2018 | Don't Give Me Up | Otto Orlandi & Molly Marrs | Released: October 26; Type: Single; Format: Download, stream; Catalogue: OMR006 |
| 2018 | Oddest Goddess (featuring Ayah Marar) | Otto Orlandi & The Chordz | Released: May 18; Type: Single; Format: Download, stream; Catalogue: OMR005 |
| 2018 | Fever (featuring RAYNE & Karmello) | Otto Orlandi | Released: March 30; Type: Single; Format: Download, stream; Catalogue: OMR004 |
| 2017 | Seven Days (featuring Melanie Fontana) | Otto Orlandi | Released: July 24; Type: Single; Format: Download, stream; Catalogue: OMR003 |
| 2017 | Don't Miss You - Remixes (featuring Melanie Fontana) | Otto Orlandi & ManyFew | Released: July 10; Type: Extended play; Format: Download, stream; Catalogue: OMR001X |
| 2017 | Volcano (featuring ADN) | Otto Orlandi | Released: June 19; Type: Single; Format: Download, stream; Catalogue: OMR002 |
| 2017 | Don't Miss You (featuring Melanie Fontana) | Otto Orlandi & ManyFew | Released: February 27; Type: Single; Format: Download, stream; Catalogue: OMR001 |
