= Meghan Patrick =

Canadian singer-songwriter (born 1987)

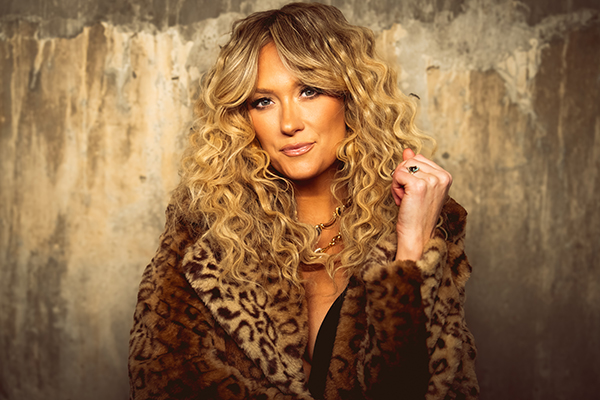
- Patrick in 2026

Background information
- Born: Meghan Sylvia Patrick; March 25, 1987 (age 39)
- Origin: Bowmanville, Ontario, Canada
- Genre: Country
- Instruments: Vocals; guitar; banjo; harmonica
- Years active: 2015–present
- Labels: Riser House; Anthem; Iron Songbird; Warner Canada
- Spouse: Mitchell Tenpenny (m. 2022)
- Website: www.meghanpatrickmusic.com

Meghan Sylvia Patrick (born March 25, 1987) is a Canadian-American country singer-songwriter from Bowmanville, Ontario. She is currently signed to Riser House Entertainment. She released her debut album, Grace & Grit, on April 29, 2016. Patrick counts Bonnie Raitt, Emmylou Harris and Aretha Franklin as her influences. She has one number one Canada Country hit with "Walls Come Down," and won the 2020 Juno Award for Canadian Country Album of the year for Wild As Me.

== Career ==
Prior to setting out as a solo artist, Patrick was the lead singer of the Stone Sparrows who released an EP and a full-length album before the members parted ways amicably in 2013 after playing their second Boots and Hearts Music Festival.

After going solo, Patrick signed a recording contract with Warner Music Canada, and a publishing deal with Olé Nashville. Her debut album, Grace & Grit, was released on April 29, 2016. In making this album Patrick worked with producers Justin Niebank (Vince Gill, LeAnn Rimes), Vince Gill, Chad Kroeger, Chris Baseford (Nickelback, Avril Lavigne) and Carly McKillip.

Patrick is a published songwriter; she has collaborated with Rodney Clawson, Gord Bamford, Chantal Kreviazuk, Marty Dodson, Patricia Conroy, Bruce Wallace, Buddy Owen, Steve Smith, Anthony Anderson, Phil Barton, Phil O'Donnell and Andrew Allan. Patrick was nominated for Songwriter of the Year with co-writer Chad Kroeger at the 2016 Canadian Country Music Association Awards for her song "Bow Chicka Wow Wow".

In 2016 Patrick was part of the advertising campaign for a new line of Roots Canada clothing.

Patrick has shared the stage with Dwight Yoakam, Jon Pardi Kip Moore, Brad Paisley, and Luke Bryan.

In June 2021, she released her third studio album, Heart on My Glass. It was her debut American release and included the singles "My First Car" and "Never Giving Up on You", as well as "Cool About It". Patrick made her Grand Ole Opry Debut on April 11, 2023.

In 2024, Patrick released the single "Golden Child", which became her first charting entry in the United States. She performed the song at the 2025 CCMA Awards, and it served as the title track to her fourth full-length studio album Golden Child, released via Riser House Records on October 11, 2024. In 2025, Patrick was selected as a member of CMT’s Next Women of Country Class. In early 2026, Patrick released her deluxe album, Golden Child (The Final Chapter) and was included in the Country Radio Seminar (CRS)’s New Faces of Country Music lineup.

== Personal life ==
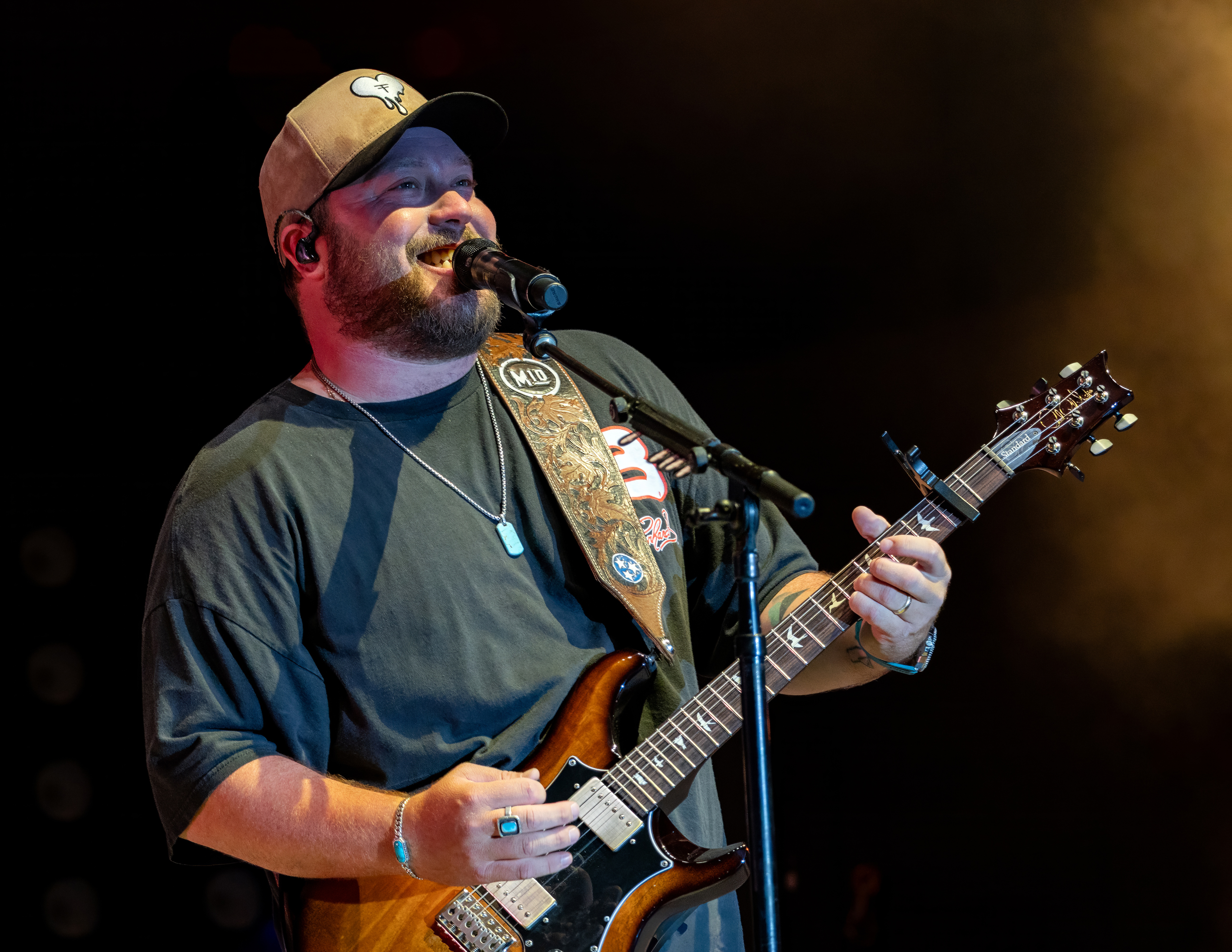
Patrick has been married to fellow country singer Mitchell Tenpenny since 2022.

Patrick is married to fellow singer Mitchell Tenpenny. She is a dual citizen of Canada and the United States, and was born to a Canadian father and an American mother. On April 4, 2026, the couple announced that they were expecting their first child together. On September 8, 2026, they announced the birth of their daughter.

== Discography ==
=== Albums ===
Title	Details	Peak positions
Title	Details	CAN
Grace & Grit	Release date: April 29, 2016; Label: Warner Music Canada	26
Country Music Made Me Do It	Release date: January 12, 2018; Label: Warner Music Canada	31
Heart on My Glass	Release date: June 25, 2021; Label: Warner Music Canada / Riser House	—
Golden Child	Release date: October 11, 2024; Label: Riser House	—

=== Extended plays ===
Title	Details
Wild as Me	Release date: September 6, 2019; Label: Warner Music Canada
Greatest Show on Dirt	Release date: May 5, 2023; Label: Riser House Entertainment

=== Singles ===
Year	Title	Peak positions		Certifications	Album
Year	Title	CAN Country	US Country Airplay	Certifications	Album
2016	"Bow Chicka Wow Wow"	17	—		Grace & Grit
2016	"Grace & Grit"	12	—		Grace & Grit
2016	"Still Loving You" (featuring Joe Nichols)	10	—		Grace & Grit
2017	"Be Country with Me"	11	—		Grace & Grit
2017	"Country Music Made Me Do It"	5	—	MC: Gold	Country Music Made Me Do It
2018	"The Bad Guy"	12	—		Country Music Made Me Do It
2018	"Walls Come Down"	1	—		Country Music Made Me Do It
2019	"Wild as Me"	9	—	MC: Gold	Wild as Me
2020	"Things I Shouldn't Say"	33	—		Wild as Me
2020	"Girls Like Me"	20	—		Wild as Me
2020	"My First Car" (Note: "My First Car" was only released as a single to country radio in the United States.)	—	—		Heart on My Glass
2021	"Never Giving Up on You"	13	—		Heart on My Glass
2021	"Cool About It"	10	—		Heart on My Glass
2023	"Greatest Show on Dirt"	15	—		Greatest Show on Dirt
2024	"Golden Child"	10	17		Golden Child
2025	"Stoned Alone" (featuring Caitlyn Smith)	—	—		Golden Child
2026	"Safe Place to Break"	7	—		Golden Child
2026	"Time After Time" (with Andrew Hyatt)	42	—		Non-album singles
2026	"Your Daddy's Smile"	30	—		Non-album singles
"—" denotes releases that did not chart or were not released to that territory

=== Promotional singles ===
Year	Title	Album
2022	"My Left Hand"	Non-album single
2023	"She's No Good for Me"	Greatest Show on Dirt
2023	"Ours"	Greatest Show on Dirt

=== Guest singles ===
Year	Title	Artist	Peak positions		Album
Year	Title	Artist	CAN Country	US Country Airplay	Album
2022	"You Ain't"	Aaron Goodvin	15	—	Non-album single
2023	"Spirits and Demons"	Michael Ray	—	35	Dive Bars & Broken Hearts

=== Other charted songs ===
Year	Title	Peak positions	Album
Year	Title	CAN AC	Album
2020	"I'll Be Home for Christmas"	37	Non-album song

=== Music videos ===
Year	Title	Director
2016	"Bow Chicka Wow Wow"	Emma Higgins
2016	"Grace & Grit"	Emma Higgins
2016	"Still Loving You"	Emma Higgins
2017	"Be Country with Me"	The Edde Brothers
2017	"Country Music Made Me Do It"	Shaun Silva
2018	"The Bad Guy"	Stephano Barberis
2018	"Walls Come Down"	Stephano Barberis
2019	"Wild as Me"	Sean Hagwell
2020	"Girls Like Me"	Sean Hagwell
2021	"My First Car"	Sean Hagwell
2021	"Never Giving Up on You"	Sean Hagwell
2021	"Cool About It"	Sean Hagwell
2023	"She's No Good for Me"	Ford Fairchild
2023	"Ours"	Ford Fairchild
2023	"Greatest Show on Dirt"	Ford Fairchild
2023	"Red Roses & Red Flags"	Ford Fairchild
2024	"Golden Child"	Ford Fairchild

== Awards and nominations ==
Year	Award	Category	Nominee/work	Result	Ref
2016	CCMA Awards	Songwriter of the Year	"Bow Chicka Wow Wow" (with Chad Kroeger)	Nominated	
2017	CMAO Awards	Single of the Year	"Still Loving You"	Nominated	
2017	CMAO Awards	Album of the Year	Grace and Grit	Won	
2017	CMAO Awards	Songwriter of the Year	"Grace and Grit" (with Patricia Conroy and Philip Barton)	Nominated	
2017	CMAO Awards	Female Artist of the Year	Meghan Patrick	Won	
2017	CMAO Awards	Rising Star Award	Meghan Patrick	Won	
2017	CMAO Awards	Fan's Choice Award	Meghan Patrick	Nominated	
2017	CMAO Awards	Music Video of the Year	"Bow Chicka Wow Wow"	Won	
2017	CCMA Awards	Album of the Year	Grace & Grit	Nominated	
2017	CCMA Awards	Female Artist of the Year	Meghan Patrick	Won	
2017	CCMA Awards	Rising Star Award	Meghan Patrick	Won	
2018	CMAO Awards	Single of the Year	"Country Music Made Me Do It"	Won	
2018	CMAO Awards	Songwriter of the Year	"Country Music Made Me Do It"	Nominated	
2018	CMAO Awards	Female Artist of the Year	Meghan Patrick	Won	
2018	CMAO Awards	Music Video of the Year	"Country Music Made Me Do It"	Won	
2018	CMAO Awards	Fans Choice Award	Meghan Patrick	Won	
2018	CCMA Awards	Album of the Year	Country Music Made Me Do It	Nominated	
2018	CCMA Awards	Female Artist of the Year	Meghan Patrick	Won	
2018	CCMA Awards	Single of the Year	"Country Music Made Me Do It"	Nominated	
2018	CCMA Awards	Video of the Year	"Country Music Made Me Do It"	Nominated	
2018	CCMA Awards	Songwriter of the Year	"Country Music Made Me Do It"	Nominated	
2019	Juno Awards	Canadian Country Album of the Year	Country Music Made Me Do It	Nominated	
2019	Juno Awards	Breakthrough Artist of the Year	Meghan Patrick	Nominated	
2019	CMAO Awards	Fan's Choice Award	Meghan Patrick	Won	
2019	CMAO Awards	Female Artist of the Year	Meghan Patrick	Won	
2019	CMAO Awards	Songwriter of the Year	Meghan Patrick	Won	
2019	CMAO Awards	Album of the Year	Country Music Made Me Do It	Won	
2019	CMAO Awards	Music Video of the Year	"Walls Come Down"	Won	
2019	CMAO Awards	Single of the Year	"Walls Come Down"	Nominated	
2019	CCMA Awards	Female Artist of the Year	Meghan Patrick	Nominated	
2019	CCMA Awards	Single of the Year	"Walls Come Down"	Nominated	
2019	CCMA Awards	Video of the Year	"Walls Come Down"	Nominated	
2020	Juno Awards	Canadian Country Album of the Year	Wild As Me	Won	
2020	CCMA Awards	Female Artist of the Year	Meghan Patrick	Nominated	
2021	CMAO Awards	Fans' Choice	Meghan Patrick	Won	
2021	CMAO Awards	Female Artist of the Year	Meghan Patrick	Won	
2021	CMAO Awards	Music Video of the Year	"Girls Like Me"	Won	
2021	CMAO Awards	Single of the Year	"Girls Like Me"	Nominated	
2021	CMAO Awards	Songwriter(s) of the Year	"Girls Like Me" (with Jobe Fortner, Ryan Nelson)	Nominated	
2021	CMAO Awards	Album of the Year	Heart on My Glass	Won	
2021	CMAO Awards	Compass Award	Meghan Patrick	Won	
2021	CMAO Awards	Fans' Choice	Meghan Patrick	Nominated	
2021	CMAO Awards	Female Artist of the Year	Meghan Patrick	Won	
2021	CMAO Awards	Music Video of the Year	"Cool About It"	Nominated	
2021	CMAO Awards	Single of the Year	"Cool About It"	Nominated	
2021	CMAO Awards	Songwriter(s) of the Year	"Cool About It" (with Cary Barlowe, Corey Crowder)	Nominated	
2022	CCMA Awards	Album of the Year	Heart on My Glass	Nominated	
2022	CCMA Awards	Female Artist of the Year	Meghan Patrick	Nominated	
2023	CMAO Awards	Fans' Choice	Meghan Patrick	Nominated	
2023	Canadian Country Music Association	Songwriter(s) of the Year	"Greatest Show on Dirt" (with Trannie Anderson, Matt McGinn, Jake Mitchell)	Nominated	
2024	CMAO Awards	Album of the Year	Greatest Show on Dirt	Won	
2025	CMAO Awards	Album of the Year	Golden Child	Nominated	
2025	Canadian Country Music Association	Album of the Year	Golden Child	Nominated	
2025	Canadian Country Music Association	Innovative Campaign of the Year	"Golden Child: The Making Of"	Nominated	
2025	Canadian Country Music Association	Musical Collaboration of the Year	"Stoned Alone" (with Caitlyn Smith)	Nominated	
2026	Juno Awards	Country Album of the Year	Golden Child	Nominated	
