= This Is the Heavy =

Studio album by Mitchell Tenpenny
- Released: September 16, 2022
- Genre: Country
- Length: 59:29
- Label: Riser House; Columbia Nashville
- Producer: Mitchell Tenpenny; Jordan Schmidt

Mitchell Tenpenny chronology
Naughty List (2021)	This Is the Heavy (2022)	The 3rd (2024)

Singles from This Is the Heavy
- 1. "Truth About You" Released: July 9, 2021; 2. "We Got History" Released: November 14, 2022

This Is the Heavy is the fourth studio album by American country music singer-songwriter Mitchell Tenpenny. It was released through Columbia Nashville and Riser House Records on September 16, 2022. It includes the singles "Truth About You" and "We Got History".

== Track listing ==
This Is the Heavy track listing
No.	Title	Writer(s)	Length
1.	"This Is the Heavy"	Zach Kale; Josh Kear; Jordan Schmidt; Mitchell Tenpenny; Michael Whitworth	0:40
2.	"Good Place"	Kale; Kear; Tenpenny; Whitworth	2:37
3.	"Always Something with You"	Ashley Gorley; Matt Rogers; Schmidt; Tenpenny	2:49
4.	"We Got History"	Andy Albert; Devin Dawson; Schmidt; Tenpenny	3:23
5.	"Truth About You"	Matt Alderman; Thomas Archer; Tenpenny	3:23
6.	"Sleeping Alone"	Brad Clawson; Rodney Clawson; Schmidt; Tenpenny	3:23
7.	"More Than Whiskey Does"	Albert; Kyle Fishman; Schmidt; Tenpenny	3:19
8.	"Obsession"	Daniel Ross; Schmidt; Tenpenny; Whitworth	2:24
9.	"Good and Gone"	Zach Abend; Seth Ennis; Tenpenny; Geoff Warburton	3:18
10.	"Do You"	Chris DeStefano; Claire Douglas; Tenpenny; Whitworth	2:55
11.	"Bucket List"	DeStefano; Tenpenny; Laura Veltz	3:25
12.	"Cry Baby"	Tenpenny; Will Weatherly; Dallas Wilson	2:51
13.	"Miss You Cause I'm Drinking"	Emma-Lee; Jesse Frasure; Tenpenny	3:29
14.	"Elephant in the Room" (featuring Teddy Swims)	Jaten Dimsdale; Christian Griswold; Tenpenny; Sam Sumser; Sean Small	2:43
15.	"Happy and I Hate It"	Ennis; Schmidt; Tenpenny; Warburton	2:34
16.	"Now We're Talking"	Albert; Schmidt; Tenpenny; Warburton	3:20
17.	"Losers"	Albert; John Harding; Ross; Tenpenny	2:48
18.	"Still Thinking 'Bout You"	Archer; Fishman; Tenpenny	2:50
19.	"Long as You Let Me"	Archer; Fishman; Schmidt; Tenpenny	3:43
20.	"That's How She Goes"	Brad Warren; Brett Warren; Tenpenny	3:35
Total length:			59:29

== Charts ==
Chart performance for This Is the Heavy
Chart (2022)	Peak position
US Billboard 200	123
US Top Country Albums (Billboard)	14
