= Priscilla Block =

American singer-songwriter (born 1995)

- Born: Priscilla Ann Block; August 10, 1995 (age 31); Raleigh, North Carolina, U.S.
- Genres: Country; country pop
- Occupation: Singer–songwriter
- Instruments: Vocals; guitar
- Years active: 2017–present
- Label: Mercury Nashville
- Website: priscillablock.com

Priscilla Ann Block (born August 11, 1995) is an American country music singer–songwriter. After graduating high school, she moved to Nashville to pursue a career in the country industry. In 2020, her song "Just About Over You" went viral on TikTok, reaching Nashville music executives who signed her to Mercury Nashville. Released as a single, "Just About Over You" was on the American country chart in 2021.

== Early life ==
Block is a native of Raleigh, North Carolina and is one of five children. According to Block, she grew up "super close" to her family. In an interview with Sounds Like Nashville, she recounted spending a lot of time outdoors with her family during childhood. From an early age she had aspirations of becoming a country artist. "I was gonna move to Nashville and chase this dream, and everybody looked at me like I was crazy," she told Songwriter Universe. She also learned to play the guitar at an early age. Block began performing in North Carolina, including the Deep South Bar in Raleigh. In 2014, she moved to Nashville and to fulfill her goals in the country music industry.

Block worked a variety of odd jobs to make a living. During her early years in Nashville, she was unhappy and considered moving home. One day, she had a chance encounter with Taylor Swift while walking down a Nashville road. Swift pulled her car over and invited Block inside. "That was truly the day that I decided that I really needed to give music a fair shot and do this thing," she commented.

== Career ==
Block began her country music career by co-writing songs with other people. She also would "sit for hours" watching Nashville artists perform. She also played several popular Nashville bars including the Listening Room Cafe and Whiskey Jam. In 2017, Block released her debut extended play (EP) titled Different Route. The project was recorded in a closet studio by a producer whom Block asked to help her cut her own material. Between 2016 and 2020, she released several songs focused around self-love and acceptance. Penned by Block herself, these tracks included "Thick Thighs" and "PMS". Many of these recordings appeared on the social media platform TikTok.

Block began releasing music on the app during the COVID-19 pandemic. "I started posting original music and those videos started doing really, really well. It was interesting because I would post cover videos and then I would post my own videos and my own original music was kind of what was working," she explained.

After running into an ex-lover in 2020, Block composed the song "Just About Over You". She posted herself singing the song live on TikTok and the video went viral. A fan of her music in California created a GoFundMe campaign to get it recorded. Three weeks after its composition, Block cut the song in a studio. "Just About Over You" then went to number one on the iTunes music chart and topped other streaming platforms. Still an unsigned artist, Block received multiple offers from Nashville record labels. Ultimately, Block chose to sign with Mercury Nashville. The label issued "Just About Over You" shortly after her 2020 signing. Mercury then released a radio edit of "Just About Over You", which was produced by Ross Copperman. Months later, Block filmed a music video for the song, directed by Logen Christopher. It peaked at number 81 on the Billboard Hot 100 and became a top 20 hit single on the Billboard country charts.

== Musical style and influences ==
Block's musical style blends country music with pop and southern rock. Writer James Christopher Monger described Block as, "a country-pop artist who found success in 2020 with a string of relatable singles that effectively paired earworm melodies with unfiltered lyrics." According to Block, she does not "commit to one sound or genre of music". "It's a little sass, a little trash and a little sad," she commented. She has cited Kelly Clarkson, Luke Combs, Miranda Lambert, Dolly Parton and Chris Stapleton as musical influences.

== Discography ==
=== Studio albums ===
List of albums, with selected chart positions, showing other relevant details
Title	Album details	Peak chart positions
Title	Album details	US Country
Welcome to the Block Party	Released: February 11, 2022; Label: InDent/Mercury Nashville; Formats: CD, LP, digital	39
Things You Didn't See	Released: October 10, 2025; Label: InDent/Mercury Nashville; Formats: CD, LP, digital	—

=== Extended plays ===
List of EPs, showing relevant details
Title	EP details
Different Route	Released: August 25, 2017; Label: Self-released; Formats: Music download
Priscilla Block	Released: April 30, 2021; Label: InDent/Mercury Nashville; Formats: CD, digital
PB2	Released: June 21, 2024; Label: InDent/Mercury Nashville; Formats: Digital

=== Singles ===
List of singles, with selected chart positions, showing other relevant details
Title	Year	Peak chart positions					Certifications	Album
Title	Year	US	US Cou. Songs	US Cou. Air.	CAN	CAN Cou.	Certifications	Album
"Just About Over You"	2020	81	17	14	—	39	RIAA: Platinum	Welcome to the Block Party
"My Bar"	2022	—	50	26	—	—		Welcome to the Block Party
"You, Me, & Whiskey" (with Justin Moore)	2022	37	8	3	77	2	RIAA: Platinum	Stray Dog
"Good on You"	2024	—	—	—	—	—		Things You Didn't See (Note: "Good on You" first appeared on the 2024 EP PB2 before officially appearing on an album.)
"—" denotes a recording that did not chart or was not released in that territory.

=== Promotional singles ===
List of promotional singles, showing all relevant details
Title	Year	Album	Ref.
"Tip of My Tongue"	2017	Different Route	
"PMS"	2020	—N/a	
"Thick Thighs"	2020	Welcome to the Block Party	
"I Bet You Wanna Know"	2021	Welcome to the Block Party	
"Peaked in High School"	2021	Welcome to the Block Party	

=== Music videos ===
List of music videos, showing year released and director
Title	Year	Director(s)	Ref.
"Just About Over You"	2021	Logen Christopher	
"Thick Thighs"	2021	Logen Christopher	
"Peaked in High School"	2021	Logen Christopher	
"My Bar"	2022	Logen Christopher	
"Off the Deep End"	2022	Rand Smith	
"You, Me, & Whiskey" (with Justin Moore)	2023	Cody Villalobos	
"Hey, Jack"	2023	Britton Webb	

== Awards and nominations ==
Year	Nominee / work	Award	Result	Ref.
2021	Academy of Country Music Awards	New Female Artist of the Year	Nominated	
2022	CMT Music Awards	Breakthrough Video of the Year – "Just About Over You"	Nominated	
2023	Academy of Country Music Awards	New Female Artist of the Year	Nominated	
