= Golden Child (Meghan Patrick song) =

2024 song by Meghan Patrick

Single by Meghan Patrick

from the album Golden Child
- Released: September 6, 2024
- Genre: Country
- Length: 3:37
- Label: Riser House
- Songwriters: Meghan Patrick; Joey Hyde; Aaron Eshuis
- Producers: Joey Hyde; Aaron Eshuis

Meghan Patrick singles chronology
"Greatest Show on Dirt" (2023)	"Golden Child" (2024)	"Stoned Alone" (2025)

Visualizer
- "Golden Child" on YouTube

"Golden Child" is a song recorded by Canadian-American country music singer Meghan Patrick. She wrote the song with Joey Hyde and Aaron Eshuis, both of whom produced the track. The title track to Patrick's fourth studio album, Golden Child, it was released as the album's lead single on September 6, 2024. It marks the singer's first solo charting effort in the United States.

== Background and release ==
Patrick was in the process of recording her album, Golden Child, when collaborator Aaron Eshuis suggested that the album needed a title track. Fellow co-writer Joey Hyde came up with the hook "Everything that glitters ain't golden, child", and Patrick elected to pursue the song as a "letter to her younger self". She intentionally left the comma out of the song's title in order to align with the album name. Hyde noted that many of lyrics were simply statements spoken by Patrick in the room that the three individuals worked to rhyme and fit into the song. Jenee Fleenor played the fiddle on the song.

Patrick's label, Riser House Records, sent the song to American country radio stations in August 2024, one month ahead of its release to digital and streaming platforms. It is her second single to be promoted in the country following "My First Car" in 2020.

A remix of the song by DJ duo Vavo was released on July 18, 2025.

== Critical reception ==
Music critic Kyla Pearson referred to the song as a "solid release," speaking positively about the use of the fiddle and Patrick's "mesmerizing, lustrous vocals". An uncredited review from All Country News favourably spoke of "Golden Child", opining that the song's "melody is bright and invigorating, echoing the lively sounds of ‘90s country while maintaining a contemporary edge."

== Live performances ==
Patrick performed "Golden Child" on the 2025 CCMA Awards on September 18, 2025.

== Chart performance ==
"Golden Child" debuted at number 58 on the Billboard Country Airplay chart dated December 21, 2024. It is her first solo charting effort in the United States, after previously reaching the top 40 as a featured artist on Michael Ray's "Spirits and Demons" earlier in the year. It peaked at number 17 on the chart dated February 14, 2026. In Canada, "Golden Child" reached a peak of number 10 on the Canada Country chart dated March 8, 2025, after 20 weeks on the chart.

== Charts ==
Chart performance for "Golden Child"
Chart (2024–2026)	Peak position
Canada Country (Billboard)	10
US Country Airplay (Billboard)	17
