= Just About Over You =

2021 single by Priscilla Block

Single by Priscilla Block

from the album Welcome to the Block Party
- Released: October 9, 2020
- Genre: Country
- Length: 2:59 (original version); 3:08 (radio edit)
- Label: Mercury Nashville
- Songwriters: Emily Kroll; Priscilla Block; Sarah Jones
- Producer: Justin Johnson

Priscilla Block singles chronology
"Just About Over You" (2020)	"My Bar" (2022)

Music video
- "Just About Over You" on YouTube

"Just About Over You" is a song recorded by American country music singer Priscilla Block. It was released as a single on October 9, 2020, from her debut self-titled EP. Block co-wrote the song with Emily Kroll and Sarah Jones, and it was produced by Justin Johnson.

== Content ==
Block released the track via TikTok in August 2020, and received over three million views and gained a following of over three hundred thousand fans. Subsequently, her fans donated to help Block record the song.

She told Theboot the story behind the song: "'Just About Over You' was actually a title that I had in my head for a long time – like, 'I'm almost over you' or 'I'm just about over you'. I had run into an ex-boyfriend, and I remember, that night, I was feeling like, [...] It's the whole idea of, you can literally convince yourself anything by putting a bandaid on it, and it was me convincing myself that I was over it when I wasn't."

== Critical reception ==
The song was named one of the best songs of 2020 by The New York Times.

== Music video ==
The music video was released on November 24, 2020, and was directed by Logen Christopher. According to the description on Universal Music Group Nashville's website, it depicts "the real-life scenario behind the heartbreak singalong after a late-night run in with her ex-boyfriend."

== Charts ==
=== Weekly charts ===
Weekly chart performance for "Just About Over You"
Chart (2020–2021)	Peak position
Canada Country (Billboard)	39
US Billboard Hot 100	81
US Country Airplay (Billboard)	14
US Hot Country Songs (Billboard)	17

=== Year-end charts ===
Year-end chart performance for "Just About Over You"
Chart (2021)	Position
US Country Airplay (Billboard)	49
US Hot Country Songs (Billboard)	55

== Certifications ==
Region	Certification	Certified units/sales
United States (RIAA)	Platinum	1,000,000^{‡}
^{‡} Sales+streaming figures based on certification alone.
