= Kate Hasting =

American country singer-songwriter

Kate Hasting is a country singer-songwriter from New Carlisle, Ohio. Her group, the Kate Hasting trio, has been featured on the Billy Block Show in Nashville, and was named Country Music Association Emerging Artists for 2015.
