= Mitchell Tenpenny =

American singer-songwriter (born 1989)

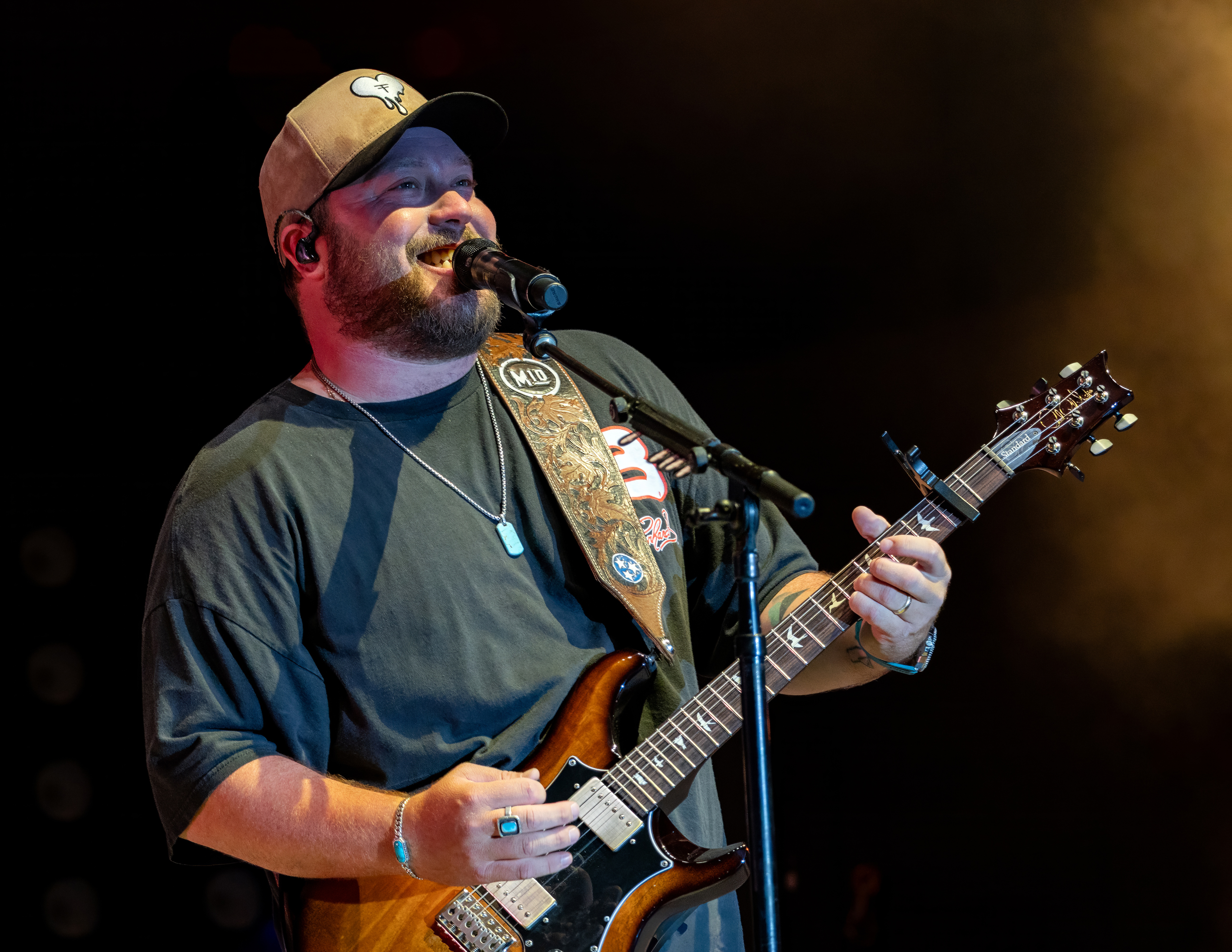
- Tenpenny performing in 2025

Background information
- Born: James Mitchell Tenpenny III; August 17, 1989 (age 37); Nashville, Tennessee
- Genre: Country pop
- Occupations: Singer; songwriter
- Years active: 2014–present
- Labels: Riser House; Columbia Nashville
- Spouse: Meghan Patrick (m. 2022)
- Website: mitchell10penny.com

James Mitchell Tenpenny III (born August 17, 1989) is an American country pop singer and songwriter from Nashville, Tennessee. He has released three studio albums and five extended plays through Riser House Records, with the first being Telling All My Secrets released in December 2018. He charted in 2018 with the single "Drunk Me", released on Columbia Records Nashville. He also co wrote "If the Boot Fits" with Granger Smith and the song made it to the top 10 on Country Airplay.

== Early life ==
Tenpenny was born and raised in Nashville, Tennessee. His grandmother was music publishing executive Donna Hilley. According to Tenpenny, when he was 11, his grandmother introduced to him songwriters Bobby Braddock and Curly Putman and he became interested in songwriting. He grew up listening to country, rock, and R&B, and cited Vince Gill, John Mayer, and Michael Jackson among his musical influences. He attended Lipscomb Academy in Nashville where he played football. He then enrolled at Middle Tennessee State University where he originally intended to play college football, but became more interested being in a band. He graduated with a music business degree.

== Music career ==
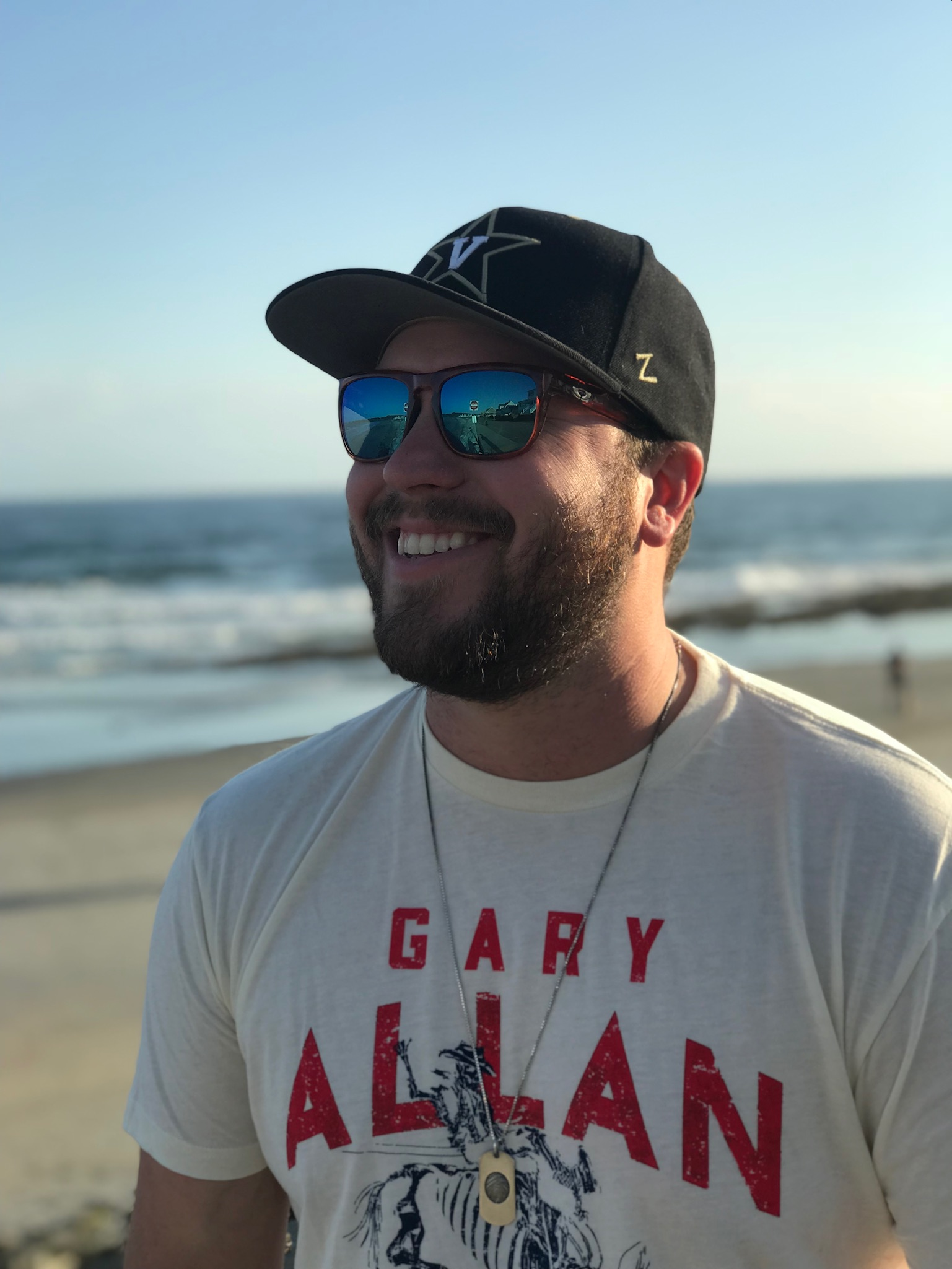
Tenpenny in 2017

Tenpenny released his debut album, titled Black Crow, in 2015. A track, "Canes Creek", featured the bluegrass band The SteelDrivers. His debut single was the title track of the album, "Black Crow". In his early songwriting career, he wrote a number of songs with artists such as Nick Fradiani; an early success is the Top 10 song he co-wrote "If the Boot Fits", recorded by Granger Smith. He signed a publishing deal with Sony ATV Music Publishing Nashville, and was involved in the documentary film The Voyage in 2014. He was signed to a newly formed Riser Records in 2016.

In July 2017, Tenpenny released an EP, Linden Ave, named after the street where his grandmother Donna Hilley used to live. The EP charted at No. 10 on Billboard's Independent Albums chart, No. 6 in Heatseekers Albums, and No. 12 in Country Album Sales, with 2,100 copies sold in its first week.

In January 2018, Tenpenny entered into a joint venture with Riser House/Columbia Nashville and released a self-titled EP on February 23, featuring a new single "Drunk Me".

He released his second album and full-length major label debut album titled Telling All My Secrets on December 14, 2018. It debuted at No. 5 on Billboard's Top Country Albums chart, and No. 53 on Billboard 200, after accruing 20,000 album equivalent units in its first week.

== Personal life ==
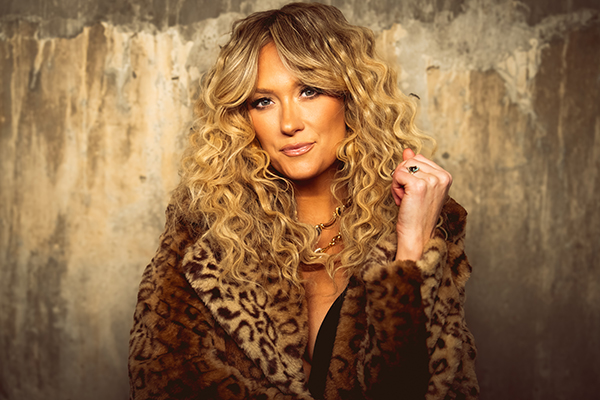
Tenpenny has been married to fellow country singer Meghan Patrick since 2022.

Tenpenny has been in a long-term relationship with fellow country singer Meghan Patrick. On November 24, 2021, the two got engaged in the bar where they first met. Tenpenny and Patrick married on October 23, 2022. On April 4, 2026, the couple announced that they were expecting their first child together. On September 8, 2026, they announced the birth of their daughter.

== Discography ==
=== Albums ===
List of albums, with selected details, peak chart positions, sales and certifications shown
Title	Album details	Peak chart positions		Sales	Certifications
Title	Album details	US	US Country	Sales	Certifications
Black Crow	Release date: April 28, 2015; Label: Creation Lab; Formats: CD, digital download	—	—		
Telling All My Secrets	Release date: December 14, 2018; Label: Riser House, Columbia Nashville; Formats: CD, vinyl, digital download, streaming	53	5	US: 31,000	RIAA: Gold
Naughty List	Release date: October 29, 2021; Label: Riser House, Columbia Nashville; Formats: CD, digital download, streaming	—	—		
This Is the Heavy	Released: September 16, 2022; Label: Riser House, Columbia Nashville; Formats: CD, digital download, streaming	123	14		
The 3rd	Released: September 20, 2024; Label: Riser House, Columbia Nashville; Formats: CD, digital download, streaming	—	—		
"—" denotes releases that did not chart

=== Extended plays ===
List of EPs, with selected details, peak chart positions and sales shown
Title	EP details	Peak chart positions			Sales
Title	EP details	US Country	US Heat	US Indie	Sales
Linden Ave	Release date: July 14, 2017; Label: Riser House Records; Formats: Digital download	—	6	10	US: 2,100
Mitchell Tenpenny	Release date: February 23, 2018; Label: Riser House Records; Formats: Digital download	35	—	—	US: 4,700
Neon Christmas	Release date: October 23, 2020; Label: Riser House Entertainment; Formats: Digital download	—	—	—	
Midtown Diaries	Release date: September 10, 2021; Label: Riser House, Columbia Nashville; Formats: CD, digital download, streaming	23	—	—	
The Low Light Sessions	Release date: April 15, 2022; Label: Riser House, Columbia Nashville; Formats: CD, digital download, streaming	—	—	—	
"—" denotes releases that did not chart

=== Singles ===
==== As lead artist ====
List of singles as lead artist, with selected peak chart positions, sales and certifications shown
Year	Title	Peak chart positions						Sales	Certifications	Album
Year	Title	US	US Country	US Country Airplay	CAN	CAN Country	NZ Hot	Sales	Certifications	Album
2015	"Black Crow"	—	―	―	―	―	―			Black Crow
2015	"Love & Rock N' Roll"	—	―	―	―	―	―			Black Crow
2018	"Drunk Me"	39	6	2	60	2	―	US: 210,000	RIAA: 4× Platinum; MC: 2× Platinum	Telling All My Secrets
2019	"Alcohol You Later"	—	41	43	―	―	―		RIAA: Gold	Telling All My Secrets
2019	"Anything She Says" (featuring Seaforth)	—	45	58	―	―	―		RIAA: Platinum	Non-album singles
2020	"Broken Up"	—	— (Note: "Broken Up" did not enter the Billboard Hot Country Songs, but peaked at number 19 on the Country Digital Songs component chart.)	58	—	—	―			Non-album singles
2021	"Truth About You"	54	11	2	― (Note: "Truth About You" did not enter the Billboard Canadian Hot 100, but peaked at number 37 on the Hot Canadian Digital Song Sales chart.)	23	―		RIAA: Platinum; MC: Platinum	This Is the Heavy
2022	"We Got History"	— (Note: "We Got History" did not enter the Billboard Hot 100, but peaked at number 10 on the Bubbling Under Hot 100 Singles chart.)	28	12	―	21	―		RIAA: Platinum; MC: Gold	This Is the Heavy
2024	"Not Today"	—	—	60	―	―	―			The 3rd
2025	"Same Moon"	—	―	36	―	―	―			The 3rd
2026	"Ain't My Problem"	—	—	49	―	―	40			Non-album single
"—" denotes releases that did not chart

==== As featured artist ====
List of singles as featured artist, with selected peak chart positions and certifications shown
Year	Title	Peak chart positions			Certifications	Album
Year	Title	US	US Country	US Country Airplay	Certifications	Album
2019	"Slow Ride" (Colt Ford featuring Mitchell Tenpenny)	—	—	—		We the People, Volume 1
2021	"At the End of a Bar" (Chris Young featuring Mitchell Tenpenny)	75	16	1	RIAA: Gold	Famous Friends
2021	"Get That All the Time" (RaeLynn featuring Mitchell Tenpenny)	—	—	—		Baytown
2022	"Act Like That" (State Champs featuring Mitchell Tenpenny)	—	—	—		Kings of the New Age
2023	"All Gas" (Bilmuri featuring Mitchell Tenpenny)	—	—	—		All Gas

==== Promotional singles ====
List of promotional singles, with selected chart positions
Year	Title	Peak chart positions			Certifications	Album
Year	Title	US Country	CAN Digital	NZ Hot	Certifications	Album
2020	"Can't Go to Church"	— (Note: "Can't Go to Church" did not enter the Hot Country Songs chart, but peaked at number 24 on the Country Digital Song Sales chart.)	—	—		Non-album singles
2020	"Here"	— (Note: "Here" did not enter the Hot Country Songs chart, but peaked at number 12 on the Country Digital Song Sales chart.)	—	—		Non-album singles
2021	"Bucket List"	45	15	—	RIAA: Gold; MC: Platinum	Midtown Diaries
2021	"To Us It Did"	—	—	—		Midtown Diaries
2025	"Therapy"	—	—	—		Non-album singles
2026	"You Phase"	—	—	35		Non-album singles
"—" denotes releases that did not chart

=== Other certified songs ===
Year	Title	Certifications	Album
2018	"Bitches"	RIAA: Gold	Telling All My Secrets

=== Music videos ===
List of music videos, with year of release and director name shown
Year	Title	Director
2015	"Black Crow"	Victor Teran
2015	"Cane's Creek"	Michael Everett
2015	"Love & Rock N' Roll"	—N/a
2017	"Bitches"	TK McKamy
2018	"Drunk Me"	Justin Key
2019	"Slow Ride" (with Colt Ford)	Michael Salomon
2020	"Anything She Says" (with Seaforth)	Roman White
2020	"Neon Christmas"	Unlisted
2023	"I Hope It Snows" (with Meghan Patrick)	Jay Curtis Miller
2025	“Therapy”	Ty Combs

== Awards and nominations ==
Year	Association	Category	Nominee / Work	Result	Ref.
2019	CMT Music Awards	Breakthrough Video of the Year	"Drunk Me"	Nominated	
2019	ACM Awards	New Male Artist of the Year	Himself	Nominated	
2024	CMA Awards	New Artist of the Year	Himself	Pending	
