= List of awards and nominations received by Jordan Schmidt =

Jordan Schmidt
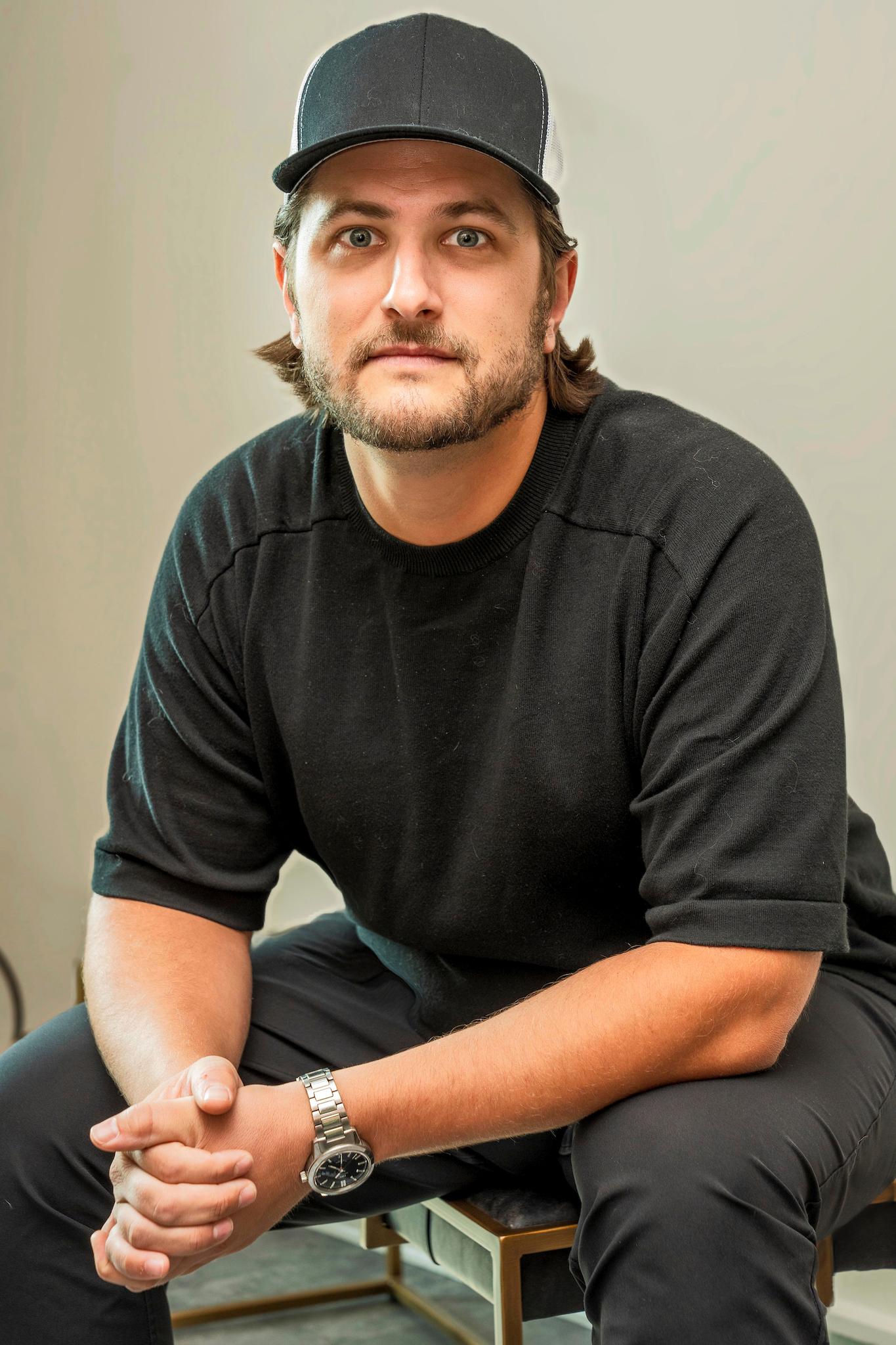
- Born: Jordan Mark Schmidt; February 26, 1988 (age 38); Duluth, Minnesota, U.S.
- Occupations: record producer; songwriter
Awards and nominations
Award	Wins	Nominations
ACM Awards	2	3
CMA Awards	2	3
CCMA Awards	0	1
People's Choice Country Awards	0	2
ASCAP Awards	0	15
NASI	1	2
Totals (Note: Certain award groups do not simply award one winner. They acknowledge several different recipients, have runners-up, and have third place. Since this is a specific recognition and is different from losing an award, runner-up mentions are considered wins in this award tally. For simplification and to avoid errors, each award in this list has been presumed to have had a prior nomination.)
- Wins: 5
- Nominations: 26
- Website: Jordan Schmidt website

Jordan Schmidt is an American mixing engineer, record producer, and songwriter. Schmidt has collaborated with numerous artists.

Schmidt's first number one song was 2016's Country rock hit Lights Come On, recorded by Jason Aldean. The song achieved RIAA Gold certification on January 31, 2017.

== Academy of Country Music ==
Academy of Country Music Awards

Year	Award	Song	Artist	Category	Name(s)	Result	Notes
2019	Single of the Year	God's Country	Blake Shelton	Songwriters	Jordan Schmidt; Devin Dawson; Michael Hardy	Won	55th ACM
2019	Song of the Year	God's Country	Blake Shelton	Songwriters	Jordan Schmidt; Devin Dawson; Michael Hardy	Nominated	55th ACM
2019	Video of the Year	God's Country	Blake Shelton	Songwriters	Jordan Schmidt; Devin Dawson; Michael Hardy	Nominated	55th ACM
2023	Song of the Year	Wait in the Truck	Hardy feat.; Lainey Wilson	Producer	Jordan Schmidt	Won	58th ACM
2023	Music Event of the Year	Wait in the Truck	Hardy feat.; Lainey Wilson	Songwriters	Jordan Schmidt; Hunter Phelps; Michael Hardy; Renee Blair	Nominated	58th ACM

== ASCAP Awards ==
American Society of Composers, Authors and Publishers (ASCAP) awards.

Year	Award	Song	Artist	Category	Name(s)	Result	Notes
2017	Song of the Year	Lights Come On	Jason Aldean	Songwriters	Jordan Schmidt; Jimmy Robbins; Brian Kelley; Tyler Hubbard; Brad Warren; Brett Warren	Nominated	
2017	Most Performed Songs	If the Boot Fits	Granger Smith	Songwriters	Jordan Schmidt; Andy Albert; Mitchell Tenpenny	Nominated	
2018	Most Performed Songs	"What Ifs" feat. Lauren Alaina	Kane Brown	Songwriters	Jordan Schmidt; Kane Brown; Matt McGinn	Nominated	
2018	Most Performed Songs	Happens Like That	Granger Smith	Songwriters	Jordan Schmidt; Andy Albert; Granger Smith; Justin Wilson; Tyler Hubbard	Nominated	
2019	Most Performed Songs * Producers	Drunk Me	Mitchell Tenpenny	Songwriters	Jordan Schmidt*; Mitchell Tenpenny*; Justin Wilson	Nominated	
2019	Most Performed Songs * Producers	You Make It Easy	Jason Aldean	Songwriters	Jordan Schmidt; Tyler Hubbard; Brian Kelley; Morgan Wallen	Nominated	
2020	Most Performed Songs	God's Country	Blake Shelton	Songwriters	Jordan Schmidt; Devin Dawson; Michael Hardy	Nominated	
2020	Most Performed Songs	We Back	Jason Aldean	Songwriters	Jordan Schmidt; Tyler Hubbard; Brad Warren; Brett Warren	Nominated	
2022	Most Performed Songs	Come Back as a Country Boy	Blake Shelton	Songwriters	Jordan Schmidt; Josh Thompson; Michael Hardy	Nominated	
2022	Most Performed Songs	"Lil Bit" feat. Florida Georgia Line	Nelly	Songwriters	Jordan Schmidt; Tyler Hubbard; Blake Redferrin; Cornell Haynes Jr.	Nominated	
2022	Most Performed Songs	Like I Love Country Music	Kane Brown	Songwriters	Jordan Schmidt; Kane Brown; Matt McGinn; Taylor Phillips	Nominated	
2023	Most Performed Songs * Producer	Wait in the truck	Hardy feat.; Lainey Wilson	Songwriters	Jordan Schmidt*; Michael Hardy; Hunter Phelps; Renee Blair	Nominated	
2023	Most Performed Songs * Producer	Drinkaby	Cole Swindell	Songwriters	Jordan Schmidt; Hunter Phelps; Jon Pardi; Michael Hardy	Nominated	
2023	Most Performed Songs * Producer	We Got History	Mitchell Tenpenny	Songwriters	Jordan Schmidt; Andy Albert; Devin Dawson; Mitchell Tenpenny	Nominated	
2023	Most Performed Songs * Producer	Bury Me in Georgia	Kane Brown	Songwriters	Jordan Schmidt; Kane Brown; Josh Hoge; Matt McGinn	Nominated	

== Canadian Country Music Association ==
Canadian Country Music Association Awards

Year	Award	Song	Artist	Category	Name(s)	Result	Notes
2022	Songwriter of the Year * Producer	Right On Time	Lindsay Ell	Songwriters	Lindsay Ell; Jordan Schmidt*; Geoffrey Warburton	Nominated	

== Country Music Association ==
Country Music Association Awards

Year	Award	Song	Artist	Category	Name(s)	Result	Notes
2019	Song of the year	God's Country	Blake Shelton	Songwriters	Jordan Schmidt; Devin Dawson; Michael Hardy	Nominated	53rd CMA
2023	Song of the Year	Wait in the Truck	Hardy feat.; Lainey Wilson	Songwriters	Jordan Schmidt; Hunter Phelps; Michael Hardy; Renee Blair	Nominated	57th CMA
2023	Single of the Year	Wait in the Truck	Hardy feat.; Lainey Wilson	Songwriters	Jordan Schmidt; Hunter Phelps; Michael Hardy; Renee Blair	Nominated	57th CMA
2023	Musical Event of the Year	Wait in the Truck	Hardy feat.; Lainey Wilson	Songwriters	Jordan Schmidt; Hunter Phelps; Michael Hardy; Renee Blair	Won	57th CMA
2024	CMA's Triple Play Award (Note: CMA's Triple Play Awards honor Country Music's greatest storytellers. These writers have penned three No. 1 songs in a 12 month period based on the Country Aircheck, Billboard Country Airplay, and Billboard Hot Country Songs charts.)			Recipient	Jordan Schmidt	Won	CMA14th Triple Play Awards

== NSAI ==
Nashville Songwriters Association International (NSAI) awards

Year	Award	Song	Artist	Category	Name(s)	Result	Notes
2019	10 Songs I Wish I Written (Note: 10 SONGS I WISH I'D WRITTEN' AWARDS "'These Awards are voted on by Professional Songwriter Members of NSAI. Songs eligible for the award have at least one Nashville-based writer and charted in the Top 20 of Billboard Airplay chart in the Christian, Country, Mainstream Top 40, and/or Rock genres during the eligible period.)	God's Country	Blake Shelton	Songwriters	Jordan Schmidt; Devin Dawson; Michael Hardy	Nominated	
2023	10 Songs I Wish I Written	Wait in the Truck	Hardy feat.; Lainey Wilson	Songwriters	Jordan Schmidt; Hunter Phelps	Nominated	
2023	Song of the Year	Wait in the Truck	Hardy feat.; Lainey Wilson	Songwriters	Jordan Schmidt; Hunter Phelps	Won	

== People's Choice Country Awards ==
The People's Choice Country Awards commenced in 2023

Year	Award	Song	Artist	Category	Name(s)	Result	Notes
2023	The Song of 2023	Wait in the Truck	Hardy feat.; Lainey Wilson	Songwriters	Jordan Schmidt; Hunter Phelps; Michael Hardy; Renee Blair	Nominated	
2023	The Collaboration Song of 2023	Wait in the Truck	Hardy feat.; Lainey Wilson	Songwriters	Jordan Schmidt; Hunter Phelps; Michael Hardy; Renee Blair	Nominated	
