= List of Billboard number-one country songs of 2022 =

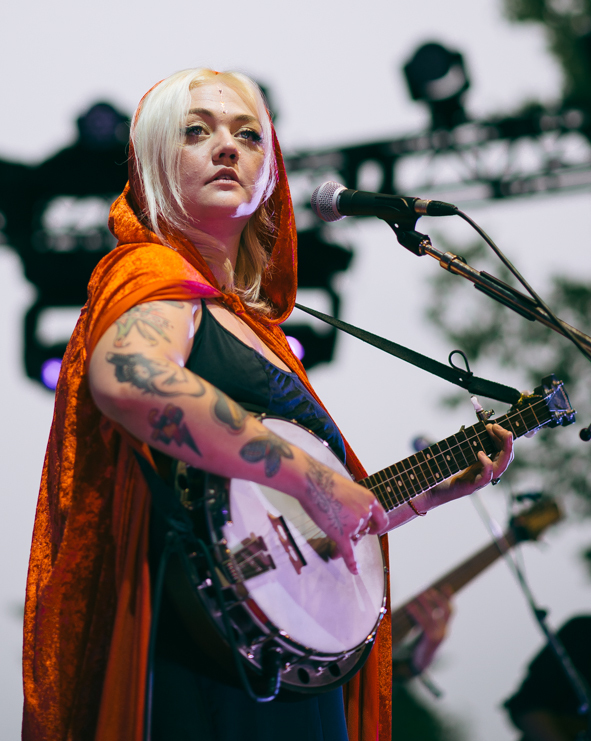
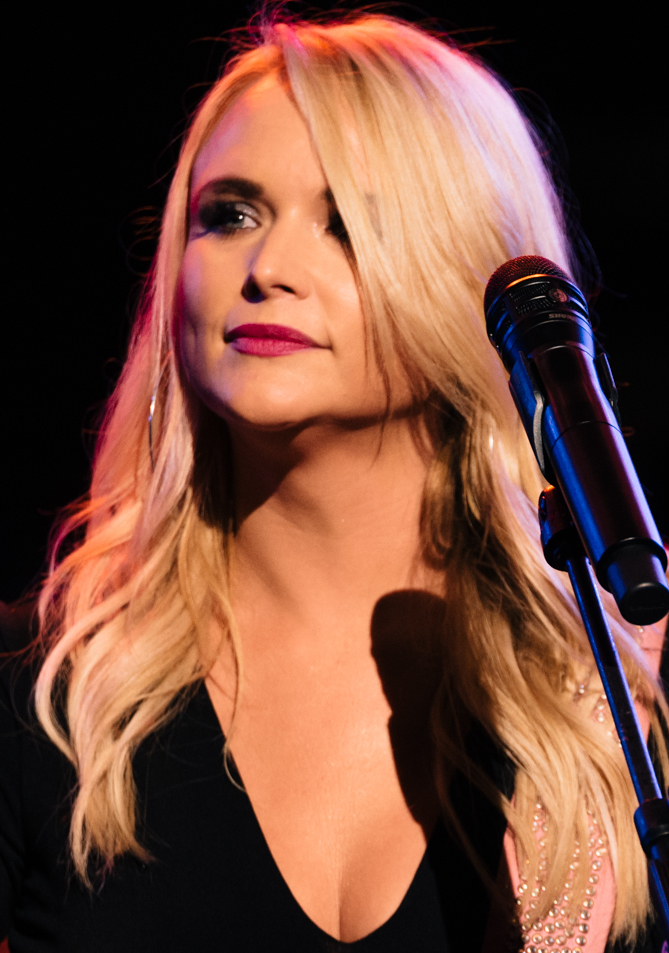
Elle King (left) and Miranda Lambert (right) collaborated on the chart-topper "Drunk (And I Don't Wanna Go Home)"..

Hot Country Songs and Country Airplay are charts that rank the top-performing country music songs in the United States, published by Billboard magazine. Hot Country Songs ranks songs based on digital downloads, streaming, and airplay not only from country stations but from stations of all formats, a methodology introduced in 2012. Country Airplay, which was first published in 2012, is based solely on country radio airplay, a methodology that had previously been used from 1990 to 2012 for Hot Country Songs. In 2022, 8 different songs topped the Hot Country Songs chart and 30 different songs topped Country Airplay in 52 issues of the magazine.

In the issue of Billboard dated January 1, 2022, "Fancy Like" by Walker Hayes held the top spot on the Hot Country Songs chart, and "Thinking 'Bout You" by Dustin Lynch and MacKenzie Porter was atop the Country Airplay chart; both songs retained their positions from the final chart of 2021. "Thinking 'Bout You" was replaced at number one in the issue dated January 22 by Michael Ray's "Whiskey and Rain", which reached the top spot in its 65th week on the chart. This tied a record set by Travis Denning's "After a Few" in June 2020 for the slowest climb to the top of that listing. In April, Elle King and Miranda Lambert's "Drunk (And I Don't Wanna Go Home)" became the first duet by two female vocalists to top a Billboard chart based on country music radio play in nearly 30 years, since Reba McEntire and Linda Davis's "Does He Love You" in November 1993. This also started a brief streak of four consecutive collaborative number one singles.

Cody Johnson achieved his first number one single in February, when "'Til You Can't" topped Hot Country Songs, and Breland achieved the same feat on the Country Airplay chart in April when he collaborated with Dierks Bentley and Hardy on "Beers on Me". In May, Ashley McBryde reached number one for the first time when her collaboration with Carly Pearce, "Never Wanted to Be That Girl", topped the Country Airplay chart. Mitchell Tenpenny gained his first chart-topper in August when "At the End of a Bar", a collaboration with Chris Young, reached number one on the airplay chart, and Riley Green made his first appearance in the peak position in November when his collaboration with Thomas Rhett, "Half of Me", topped the same listing. Tyler Hubbard gained his first solo number one in November when "5 Foot 9" topped Country Airplay; he had previously spent time at number one as half of the duo Florida Georgia Line. In doing so, Hubbard became the first artist to gain a country number one as part of a duo or group and repeat the feat as a solo act. In December, Bailey Zimmerman gained his first number one when "Fall in Love" topped the airplay chart, making him the first artist to top the chart with their first entry since October 2021.

Morgan Wallen achieved the most number-one country songs in 2022, with five of his songs topping one or both charts. One of these, "Wasted on You", returned to number one on Hot Country Songs 16 months after its first appearance in the top spot in January 2021; "You Proof", also by Wallen, was the year's longest-running number one on both charts with nineteen weeks in the top spot on Hot Country Songs and nine on Country Airplay. It would go on to ultimately spend ten weeks at the top on the latter chart, setting a new record for the longest-running number one single based strictly off country radio airplay, surpassing Lonestar's "Amazed" (1999) and Alan Jackson and Jimmy Buffett's "It's Five O'Clock Somewhere" (2003), which each spent eight weeks at the top. With its time at number one spanning three separate runs, "You Proof" became the first single to rebound to the top after multiple songs reached number one in between. In total, Wallen spent 31 weeks at number one on Hot Country Songs, and 13 on Country Airplay, the most by any act on each listing. Kane Brown and Cole Swindell were the only other acts to achieve more than one number-one country single during 2022, with two each. Swindell's "She Had Me at Heads Carolina" was the only other single besides "You Proof" to spend more than three weeks at the top, with four.

== Chart history ==
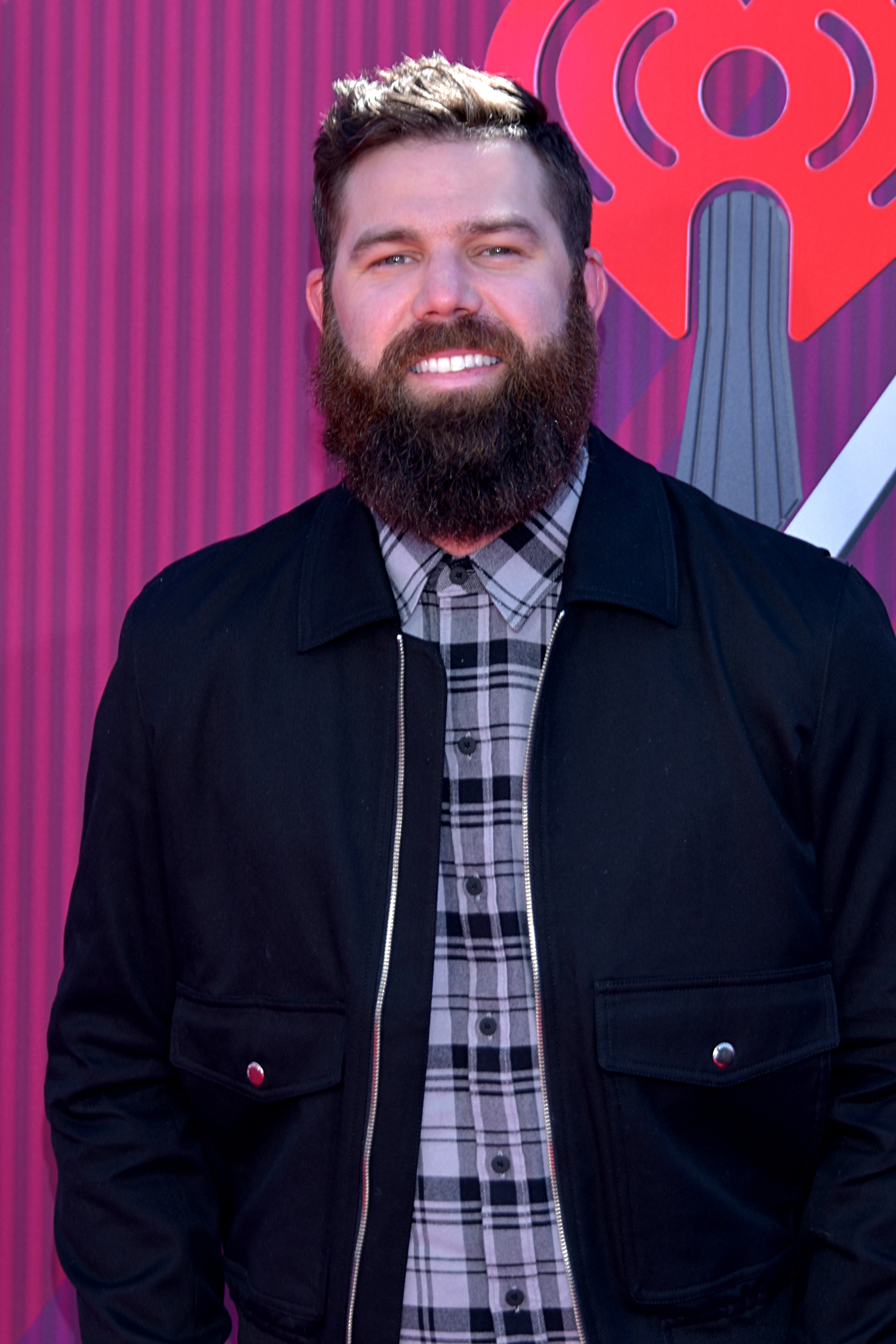
Jordan Davis's "Buy Dirt" featuring Luke Bryan took the number one slot on both Hot Country Songs and Country Airplay for two weeks.

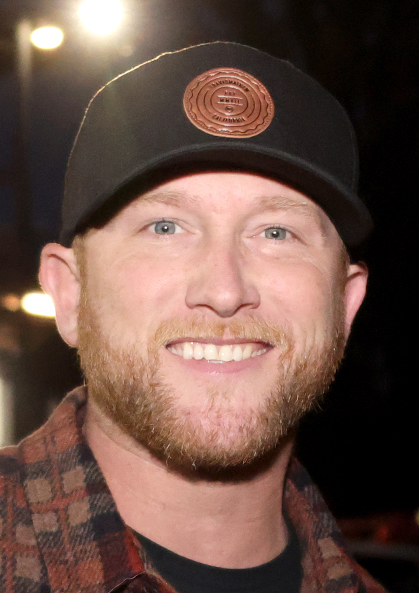
Cole Swindell's "She Had Me at Heads Carolina" was the first song of the year to spend more than three weeks at number one on Country Airplay.

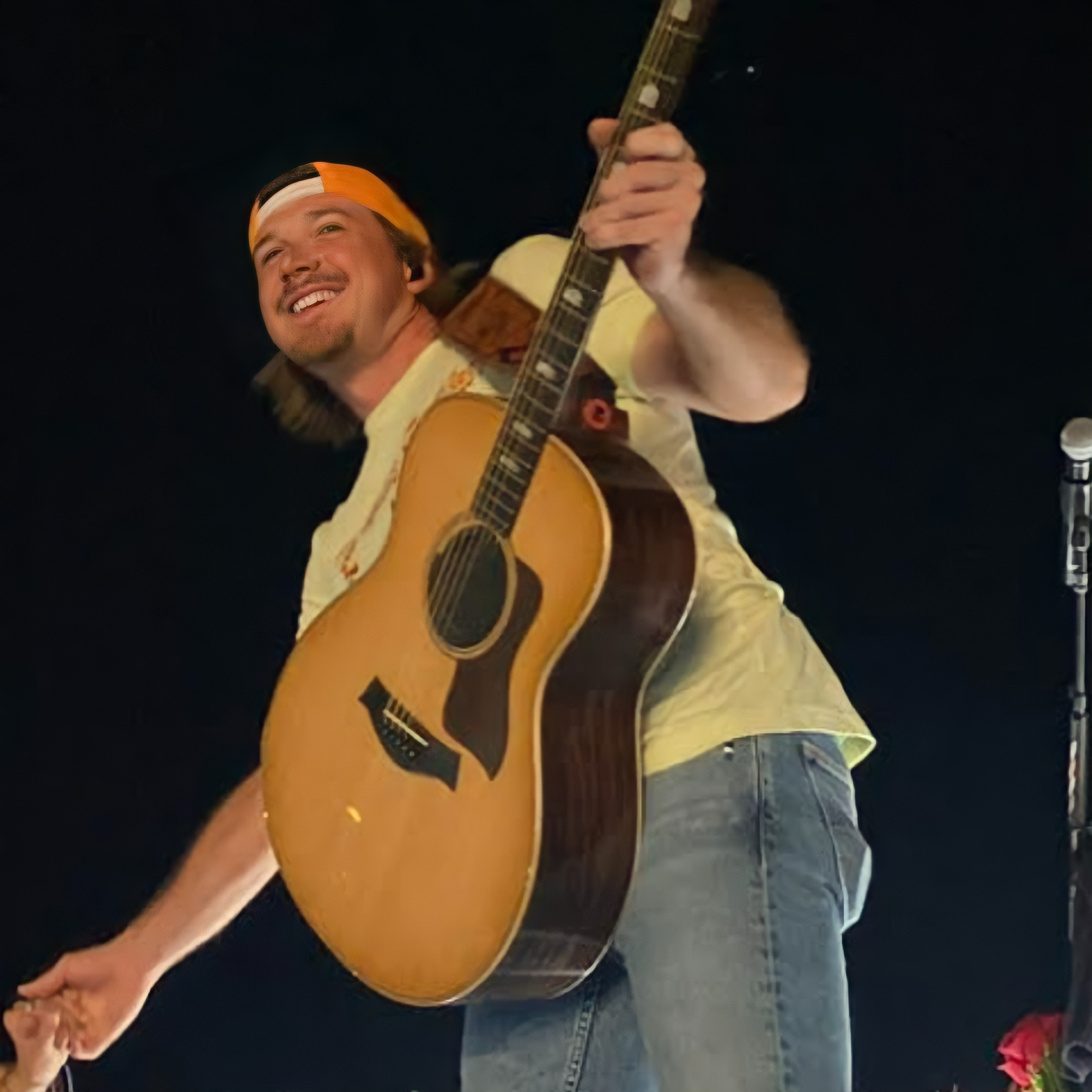
Five of Morgan Wallen's songs reached number one on at least one chart, more than any other act.

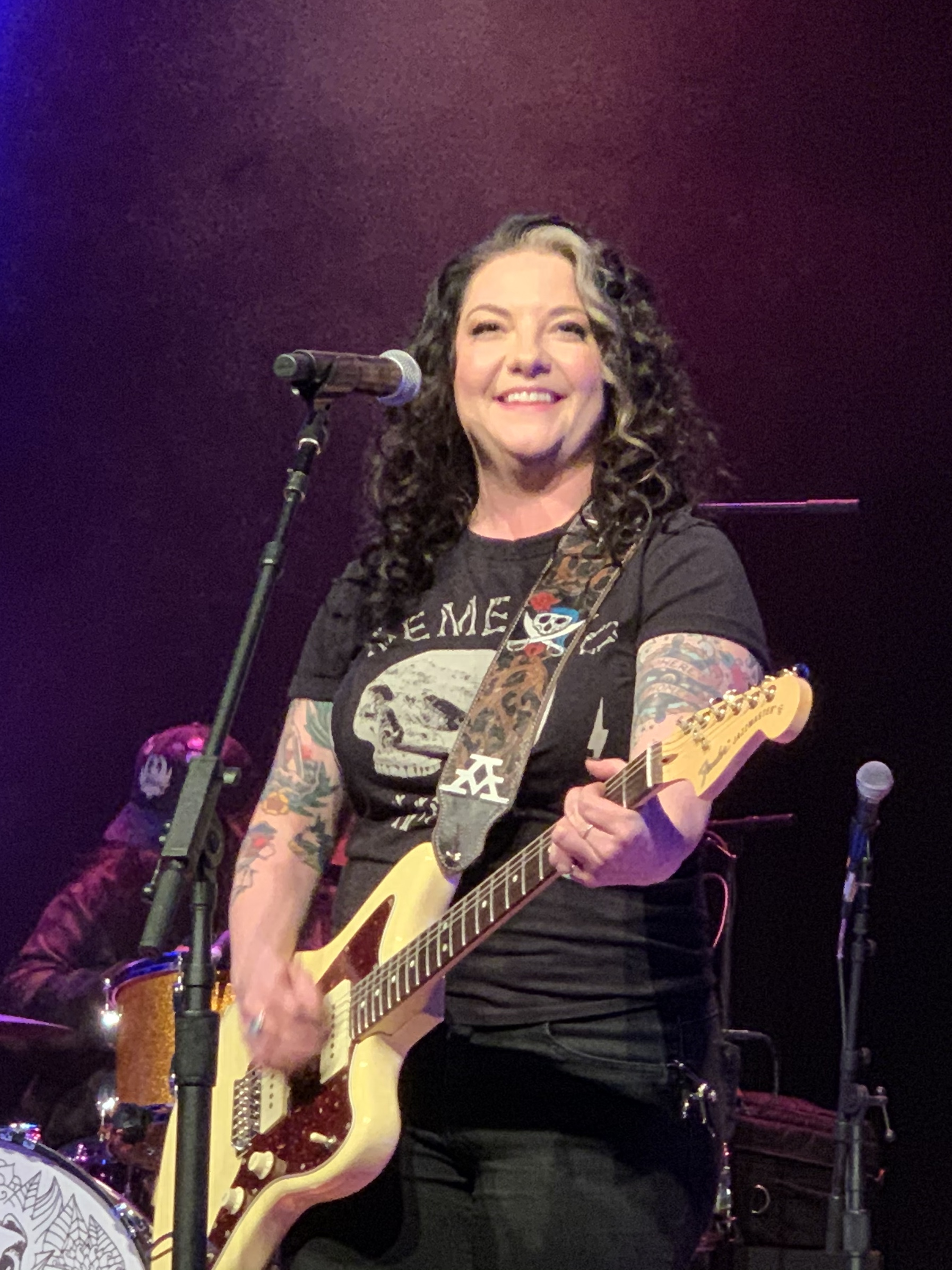
Ashley McBryde gained her first number one when she collaborated with Carly Pearce on "Never Wanted to Be That Girl".

Chart history
Issue date	Hot Country Songs			Country Airplay		
Issue date	Title	Artist(s)	Ref.	Title	Artist(s)	Ref.
January 1	"Fancy Like"	Walker Hayes		"Thinking 'Bout You"	Dustin Lynch featuring MacKenzie Porter	
January 8	"Fancy Like"	Walker Hayes		"Thinking 'Bout You"	Dustin Lynch featuring MacKenzie Porter	
January 15	"Fancy Like"	Walker Hayes		"Thinking 'Bout You"	Dustin Lynch featuring MacKenzie Porter	
January 22	"Fancy Like"	Walker Hayes		"Whiskey and Rain"	Michael Ray	
January 29	"Buy Dirt"	Jordan Davis featuring Luke Bryan		"Buy Dirt"	Jordan Davis featuring Luke Bryan	
February 5	"Buy Dirt"	Jordan Davis featuring Luke Bryan		"Buy Dirt"	Jordan Davis featuring Luke Bryan	
February 12	"Buy Dirt"	Jordan Davis featuring Luke Bryan		"You Should Probably Leave"	Chris Stapleton	
February 19	"You Should Probably Leave"	Chris Stapleton		"Freedom Was a Highway"	Jimmie Allen and Brad Paisley	
February 26	"'Til You Can't"	Cody Johnson		"Sand in My Boots"	Morgan Wallen	
March 5	"'Til You Can't"	Cody Johnson		"One Mississippi"	Kane Brown	
March 12	"Buy Dirt"	Jordan Davis featuring Luke Bryan		"Half of My Hometown"	Kelsea Ballerini featuring Kenny Chesney	
March 19	"'Til You Can't"	Cody Johnson		"To Be Loved by You"	Parker McCollum	
March 26	"'Til You Can't"	Cody Johnson		"'Til You Can't"	Cody Johnson	
April 2	"'Til You Can't"	Cody Johnson		"'Til You Can't"	Cody Johnson	
April 9	"'Til You Can't"	Cody Johnson		"23"	Sam Hunt	
April 16	"'Til You Can't"	Cody Johnson		"Drunk (And I Don't Wanna Go Home)"	Elle King and Miranda Lambert	
April 23	"'Til You Can't"	Cody Johnson		"Beers on Me"	Dierks Bentley, Breland and Hardy	
April 30	"Don't Think Jesus"	Morgan Wallen		"Never Say Never"	Cole Swindell and Lainey Wilson	
May 7	"'Til You Can't"	Cody Johnson		"Never Say Never"	Cole Swindell and Lainey Wilson	
May 14	"Wasted on You"	Morgan Wallen		"Never Wanted to Be That Girl"	Carly Pearce and Ashley McBryde	
May 21	"Thought You Should Know"	Morgan Wallen		"Doin' This"	Luke Combs	
May 28	"You Proof"	Morgan Wallen		"Trouble with a Heartbreak"	Jason Aldean	
June 4	"Wasted on You"	Morgan Wallen		"Trouble with a Heartbreak"	Jason Aldean	
June 11	"Wasted on You"	Morgan Wallen		"Trouble with a Heartbreak"	Jason Aldean	
June 18	"Wasted on You"	Morgan Wallen		"Take My Name"	Parmalee	
June 25	"Wasted on You"	Morgan Wallen		"Take My Name"	Parmalee	
July 2	"Wasted on You"	Morgan Wallen		"Wasted on You"	Morgan Wallen	
July 9	"The Kind of Love We Make"	Luke Combs		"Wasted on You"	Morgan Wallen	
July 16	"Wasted on You"	Morgan Wallen		"Wasted on You"	Morgan Wallen	
July 23	"Wasted on You"	Morgan Wallen		"Damn Strait"	Scotty McCreery	
July 30	"Wasted on You"	Morgan Wallen		"Damn Strait"	Scotty McCreery	
August 6	"Wasted on You"	Morgan Wallen		"Damn Strait"	Scotty McCreery	
August 13	"The Kind of Love We Make"	Luke Combs		"New Truck"	Dylan Scott	
August 20	"The Kind of Love We Make"	Luke Combs		"Like I Love Country Music"	Kane Brown	
August 27	"The Kind of Love We Make"	Luke Combs		"At the End of a Bar"	Chris Young with Mitchell Tenpenny	
September 3	"You Proof"	Morgan Wallen		"Last Night Lonely"	Jon Pardi	
September 10	"You Proof"	Morgan Wallen		"With a Woman You Love"	Justin Moore	
September 17	"You Proof"	Morgan Wallen		"She Had Me at Heads Carolina"	Cole Swindell	
September 24	"You Proof"	Morgan Wallen		"She Had Me at Heads Carolina"	Cole Swindell	
October 1	"You Proof"	Morgan Wallen		"She Had Me at Heads Carolina"	Cole Swindell	
October 8	"You Proof"	Morgan Wallen		"She Had Me at Heads Carolina"	Cole Swindell	
October 15	"You Proof"	Morgan Wallen		"You Proof"	Morgan Wallen	
October 22	"You Proof"	Morgan Wallen		"You Proof"	Morgan Wallen	
October 29	"You Proof"	Morgan Wallen		"You Proof"	Morgan Wallen	
November 5	"You Proof"	Morgan Wallen		"You Proof"	Morgan Wallen	
November 12	"You Proof"	Morgan Wallen		"You Proof"	Morgan Wallen	
November 19	"You Proof"	Morgan Wallen		"5 Foot 9"	Tyler Hubbard	
November 26	"You Proof"	Morgan Wallen		"Half of Me"	Thomas Rhett featuring Riley Green	
December 3	"You Proof"	Morgan Wallen		"You Proof"	Morgan Wallen	
December 10	"You Proof"	Morgan Wallen		"Fall in Love"	Bailey Zimmerman	
December 17	"You Proof"	Morgan Wallen		"You Proof"	Morgan Wallen	
December 24	"You Proof"	Morgan Wallen		"You Proof"	Morgan Wallen	
December 31	"You Proof"	Morgan Wallen		"You Proof"	Morgan Wallen	

== See also ==
- 2022 in country music
- List of artists who reached number one on the U.S. Hot country chart
- List of Top Country Albums number ones of 2022
