= Back Then Right Now =

Single by Tyler Hubbard

from the album Strong
- Released: September 8, 2023
- Genre: Country
- Length: 3:21
- Label: EMI Nashville
- Songwriters: Tyler Hubbard; David Garcia; Jessie Jo Dillon; Geoff Warburton
- Producers: Tyler Hubbard; Jordan Schmidt

Tyler Hubbard singles chronology
"Dancin' in the Country" (2023)	"Back Then Right Now" (2023)	"Park" (2024)

"Back Then Right Now" is a song by American country music singer Tyler Hubbard, written by him along with David Garcia, Jessie Jo Dillon, and Geoff Warburton. It was released on September 8, 2023, as the lead single from Hubbard's second solo studio album Strong.

== History ==
Tyler Hubbard wrote "Back Then Right Now" in 2023 during a writing session with David Garcia, Jessie Jo Dillon, and Geoff Warburton at Garcia's studio. Warburton began playing a riff on one of Garcia's guitars which was in an alternate tuning, creating a two-chord pattern to which the others added. Dillon provided the lyric "back then, right now", which she said came from a comment her uncle made about a truck he owned. The four of them decided on making a song with a theme of nostalgia, about which Garcia stated, "Turns out that if you slow down a little bit, you might enjoy this gift of life we have a little bit more." After completing a demo track, Hubbard took it to producer Jordan Schmidt. The final recording includes a number of guitar tracks and a Dobro, all played by session musician Jonny Fung.

== Charts ==
=== Weekly charts ===
Weekly chart performance
Chart (2023–2024)	Peak position
Canada Hot 100 (Billboard)	94
Canada Country (Billboard)	2
US Billboard Hot 100	62
US Country Airplay (Billboard)	1
US Hot Country Songs (Billboard)	9

=== Year-end charts ===
Annual chart rankings
Chart (2024)	Position
US Country Airplay (Billboard)	14
US Hot Country Songs (Billboard)	52
US Radio Songs (Billboard)	45

== Certifications ==
Certifications for "Back Then Right Now"
Region	Certification	Certified units/sales
Canada (Music Canada)	Gold	40,000^{‡}
United States (RIAA)	Gold	500,000^{‡}
^{‡} Sales+streaming figures based on certification alone.
