= Strong (Tyler Hubbard album) =

Studio album by Tyler Hubbard
- Released: April 12, 2024
- Genre: Country
- Length: 40:13
- Label: EMI Nashville
- Producer: Tyler Hubbard; Jordan Schmidt

Tyler Hubbard chronology
Tyler Hubbard (2023)	Strong (2024)

Singles from Strong
- 1. "Back Then Right Now" Released: September 8, 2023; 2. "Park" Released: June 17, 2024

Strong is the second solo studio album by American country musician Tyler Hubbard. It was released on April 12, 2024, via EMI Nashville.

== Critical reception ==
Alli Patton of Holler Country stated "with his sophomore solo effort, Strong, the artist is taking us right back to that chrome-plated era of country music".

Nancy Kruh of People stated that the album is "tailor-made for jubilant live performances" and that "Like the first album, they're a celebration of what most captures Hubbard's heart: his love for his wife, the simple life, and good times".

== Track listing ==
All tracks are written by Tyler Hubbard, with additional co-writers as noted.

Strong track listing
No.	Title	Writer(s)	Length
1.	"Wish You Would"	Corey Crowder; Chris LaCorte	3:06
2.	"Park"	Jesse Frasure; Ashley Gorley; Canaan Smith	2:44
3.	"A Lot with a Little"	Casey Brown; Parker Welling	3:03
4.	"Night Like That"	Jordan Schmidt; Andy Albert	2:39
5.	"Take Me Back"	Crowder; LaCorte	3:11
6.	"Back Then Right Now"	Jessie Jo Dillon; David Garcia; Geoff Warburton	3:21
7.	"Vegas"	Albert; Schmidt	3:02
8.	"Turn"	Brown; Josh Miller	3:25
9.	"American Mellencamp"	Schmidt; Jaren Johnston	2:51
10.	"BNA"	Schmidt; Chase McGill	2:26
11.	"Summer Talkin'"	Dillon; Frasure; Gorley	3:40
12.	"'73 Beetle"		3:40
13.	"Strong"	Matt Dragstrem; Miller	2:56
Total length:			40:13

== Charts ==
=== Weekly charts ===
Weekly chart performance for Strong
Chart (2024)	Peak position
US Billboard 200	187
US Top Country Albums (Billboard)	35

=== Year-end charts ===
Year-end chart performance for Strong
Chart (2024)	Position
Australian Country Albums (ARIA)	69
