= Body Language (Blake Shelton album) =

Studio album by Blake Shelton
- Released: May 21, 2021
- Recorded: 2020–2021
- Genre: Country
- Length: 38:18
- Label: Warner Bros. Nashville; Ten Point Productions
- Producer: Scott Hendricks

Blake Shelton chronology
| Fully Loaded: God's Country (2019) | Body Language (2021) | For Recreational Use Only (2025) |

Singles from Body Language
- 1. "Happy Anywhere" Released: July 24, 2020; 2. "Minimum Wage" Released: January 15, 2021; 3. "Come Back as a Country Boy" Released: October 4, 2021

Body Language is the twelfth studio album by American country music singer Blake Shelton. The album was released on May 21, 2021, by Warner Bros. Nashville and Ten Point Productions.

== Commercial performance ==
Body Language debuted at number eighteen on the Billboard 200 with 24,000 units (15,000 pure). The same week, Shelton earned his 17th top 10 on Billboard's Top Country Albums chart.

== Track listing ==
Body Language track listing
| No. | Title | Writer(s) | Length |
|---|---|---|---|
| 1. | "Minimum Wage" | Nicolle Galyon; Jesse Frasure; Corey Crowder | 3:48 |
| 2. | "Body Language" (featuring The Swon Brothers) | Colton Swon; Zach Swon; Matt McGinn; Ryan Beaver | 2:49 |
| 3. | "Happy Anywhere" (featuring Gwen Stefani) | Ross Copperman; Josh Osborne; Matt Jenkins | 2:50 |
| 4. | "Now I Don't" | Jessi Alexander; Alyssa Vanderheym; Hardy | 3:50 |
| 5. | "Monday Mornin' Missin' You" | Alexander; Deric Ruttan; Josh Thompson | 3:40 |
| 6. | "Corn" | Craig Wiseman; Matt Dragstrem; Chris Tompkins; Rodney Clawson | 2:59 |
| 7. | "Makin' It Up as You Go" | Brad Tursi; Shane McAnally; Osborne | 2:41 |
| 8. | "Whatcha Doin' Tomorrow" | Dallas Davidson; Kyle Fishman; Casey Beathard | 2:41 |
| 9. | "The Girl Can't Help It" | Ben Hayslip; Osborne; Mark Holman | 2:44 |
| 10. | "The Flow" | McAnally; Copperman; Osborne | 2:55 |
| 11. | "Neon Time" | Jaron Boyer; Michael Tyler; Ben West | 3:45 |
| 12. | "Bible Verses" | Joe Fox; Andrew Peebles; Brett Sheroky | 3:36 |
| Total length: | | | 38:18 |

Body Language (Deluxe)
| No. | Title | Writer(s) | Length |
|---|---|---|---|
| 1. | "Come Back as a Country Boy" | Hardy; Josh Thompson; Jordan Schmidt | 3:41 |
| 2. | "Fire Up the Night" (featuring Hardy) | Hardy; Brian Kelley; Schmidt; Bart Butler | 3:12 |
| 3. | "Minimum Wage" | Nicolle Galyon; Jesse Frasure; Corey Crowder | 3:48 |
| 4. | "Body Language" (featuring The Swon Brothers) | Colton Swon; Zach Swon; Matt McGinn; Ryan Beaver | 2:49 |
| 5. | "Happy Anywhere" (featuring Gwen Stefani) | Ross Copperman; Josh Osborne; Matt Jenkins | 2:50 |
| 6. | "Now I Don't" | Jessi Alexander; Alyssa Vanderheym; Hardy | 3:50 |
| 7. | "Monday Mornin' Missin' You" | Alexander; Deric Ruttan; Josh Thompson | 3:40 |
| 8. | "Corn" | Craig Wiseman; Matt Dragstrem; Chris Tompkins; Rodney Clawson | 2:59 |
| 9. | "Makin' It Up as You Go" | Brad Tursi; Shane McAnally; Osborne | 2:41 |
| 10. | "Whatcha Doin' Tomorrow" | Dallas Davidson; Kyle Fishman; Casey Beathard | 2:41 |
| 11. | "The Girl Can't Help It" | Ben Hayslip; Osborne; Mark Holman | 2:44 |
| 12. | "The Flow" | McAnally; Copperman; Osborne | 2:55 |
| 13. | "Neon Time" | Jaron Boyer; Michael Tyler; Ben West | 3:45 |
| 14. | "Bible Verses" | Joe Fox; Andrew Peebles; Brett Sheroky | 3:36 |
| 15. | "Throw It On Back" (featuring Brooks & Dunn) | Bobby Pinson; Ben Hayslip; Rhett Akins | 3:08 |
| 16. | "We Can Reach the Stars" | Blake Shelton; Craig Wiseman | 3:36 |
| Total length: | | | 51:55 |

== Personnel ==
Musicians

- Blake Shelton – lead vocals
- Bryan Sutton – acoustic guitar (1, 2, 4, 6, 8, 10, 12), banjo (6, 10), ukulele (10)
- Gordon Mote – Hammond B3 organ (1, 3, 6, 10), piano (1, 4, 5, 8, 9, 11, 12), synthesizer (6, 10, 12)
- Kara Britz – backing vocals (1)
- Jimmie Lee Sloas – bass guitar (1–5, 7–9, 11)
- Nir Z. – programming (all tracks), drums (1–11), percussion (2–5, 7–9, 11, 12)
- Tom Bukovac – electric guitar (1–5, 7–9, 11)
- Troy Lancaster – electric guitar
- Russ Pahl – pedal steel guitar (1–5, 7–9, 11)
- Blake Bollinger – programming (1, 2, 4, 7, 8), synthesizer (1, 2, 4, 7–9)
- Justin Niebank – programming (1–5, 7–11)
- Nicholas "Blaze" Baum – acoustic guitar, electric guitar (2)
- Gwen Stefani – duet vocals (3)
- Zach Swon – acoustic guitar, backing vocals, electric guitar, keyboards (2)
- Colton Swon – backing vocals (2)
- Perry Coleman – backing vocals (2, 4–12)
- Ilya Toshinsky – acoustic guitar (3, 5, 7, 9, 11), banjo (3)
- Rob McNelley – electric guitar (5, 6, 8–12)
- Glenn Worf – bass guitar (6, 10, 12)
- Paul Franklin – Dobro (6), pedal steel guitar (10, 12)
- Jenee Fleenor – fiddle (6, 10)

Technical

- Scott Hendricks – producer, digital editor, additional engineer
- Andrew Mendelson – mastering engineer
- Justin Niebank – mixing engineer, audio engineer, recording engineer
- Scott Johnson – assistant production
- Brian David Willis – digital editor
- Drew Bollman – assistant engineer
- Josh Ditty – assistant engineer
- Charlie Marshall – assistant engineer (3)
- Kam Luchterhand – assistant engineer (3)
- Tate McDowell – assistant engineer (3)

== Charts ==
=== Weekly charts ===
Weekly chart performance for Body Language
| Chart (2021) | Peak position |
|---|---|
| Canadian Albums (Billboard) | 50 |
| US Billboard 200 | 18 |
| US Top Country Albums (Billboard) | 3 |

=== Year-end charts ===
Year-end chart performance for Body Language
| Chart (2021) | Position |
|---|---|
| US Top Country Albums (Billboard) | 72 |
