= 2023 People's Choice Country Awards =

American country music award ceremony

- Date: September 28, 2023
- Location: Grand Ole Opry, Nashville, Tennessee
- Hosted by: Little Big Town

Highlights
- Most wins: Jelly Roll (4)
- Most nominations: Morgan Wallen (11)

Television/radio coverage
- Network: NBC, Peacock
- Viewership: 3.9 million

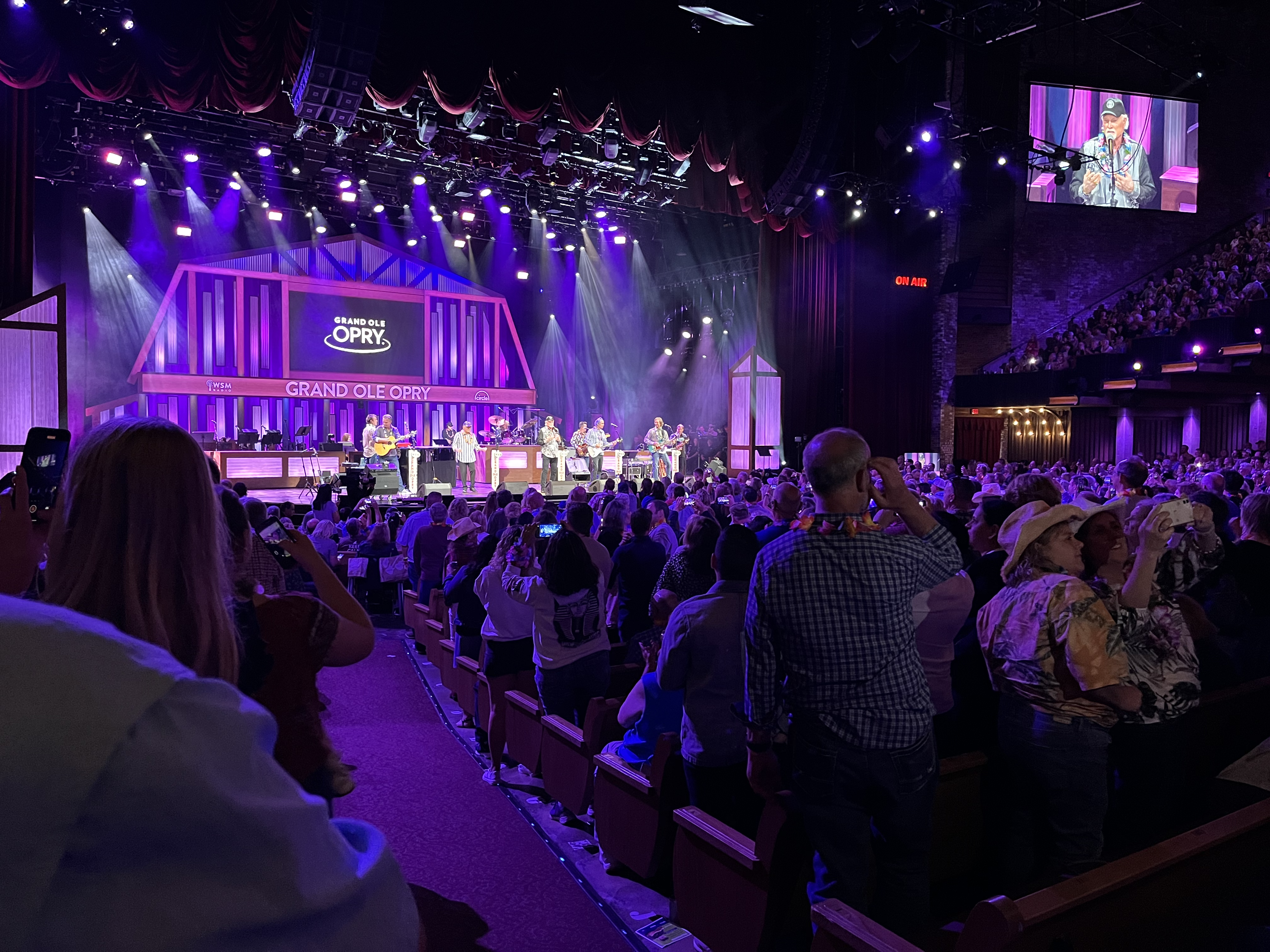
Interior of the Grand Ole Opry, where the ceremony was held in September 2023.

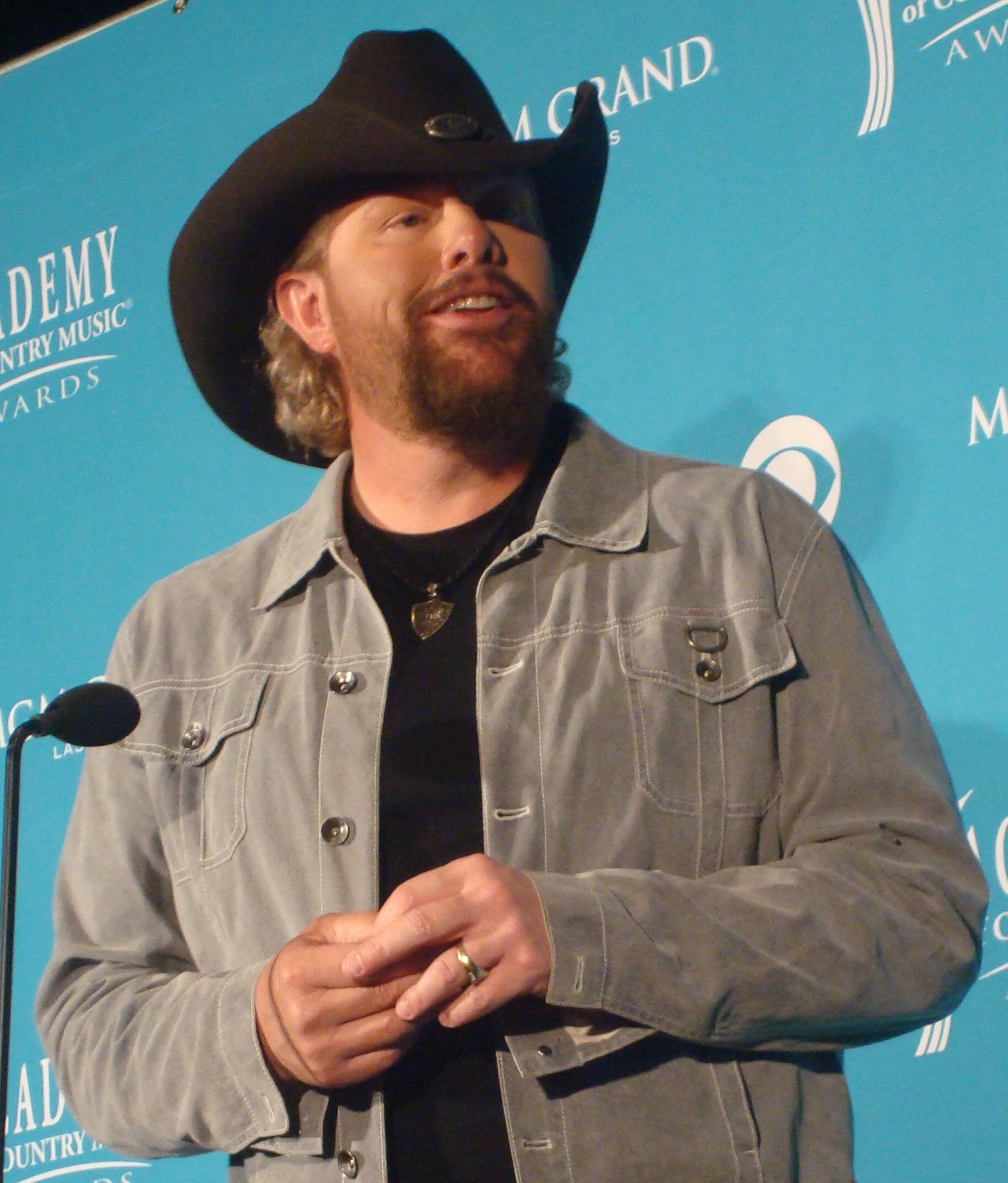
Toby Keith, who received the inaugural Country Icon award.

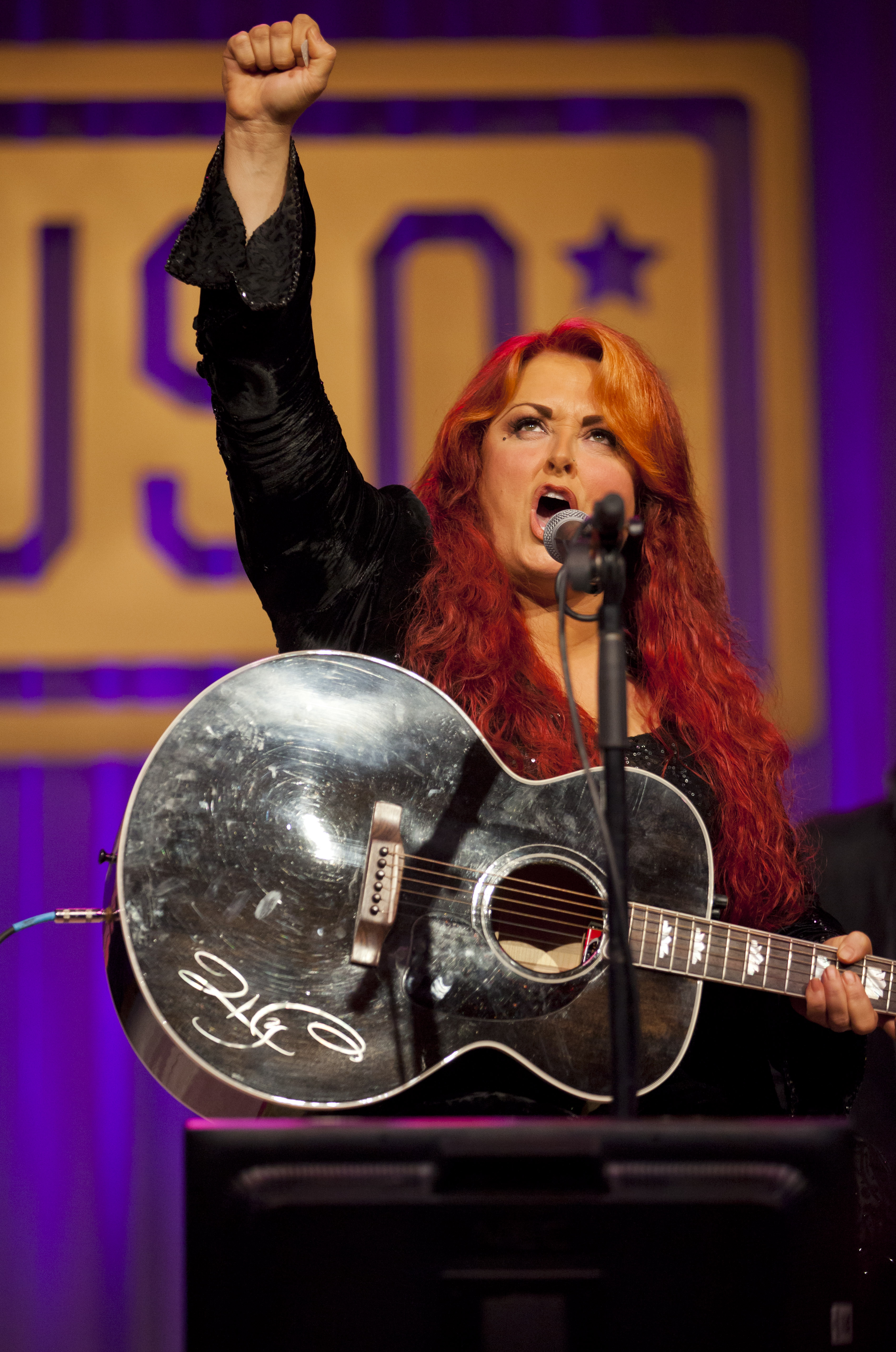
Wynonna Judd, who received the inaugural Country Champion award.

The 2023 People's Choice Country Awards, the inaugural ceremony, was held on September 28, 2023 at the Grand Ole Opry in Nashville, Tennessee. It was hosted by country music group Little Big Town. The ceremony was broadcast live on NBC and was made available to stream on Peacock.

The People's Choice Country Awards recognize "the biggest and best that country music has to offer" chosen entirely by the fans across various categories. Several honorary awards will also be bestowed during the awards ceremony.

== Background and development ==
On March 9, 2023, NBCUniversal announced that they would be premiering a spin-off of the long-running People's Choice Awards, honoring country music's most popular artists, with the winners chosen entirely by the fans, though several honorary awards would also be awarded.

On July 18, 2023, it was announced that country music legend, Toby Keith, would receive the inaugural Country Icon Award, the award was presented to him by fellow Oklahoman, Blake Shelton. The nominations were announced on August 16, 2023 with Morgan Wallen leading with eleven, followed by Luke Combs with eight. Lainey Wilson was the most nominated female artist with seven nods. Wynonna Judd, was honored with the Country Champion Award. Toby Keith received the Country Icon Award. On September 8, 2023, it was announced that country music legend, Wynonna Judd, would receive the inaugural Country Champion Award, the award celebrated her decades-long career and efforts around philanthropy and activism.

During the ceremony there were live performances by Blake Shelton, Carly Pearce, Dan + Shay, HARDY, Jelly Roll, Kane Brown, Kelsea Ballerini, Little Big Town and Wynonna. While receiving his Icon Award honor, Toby Keith performed for the first time since the end of his cancer treatment. This was also one of Keith's last public appearances and before his death on February 5, 2024.

== Winners and nominees ==
All nominees are listed below, and the winners are listed in bold.

The People’s Artist of 2023	The Female Artist of 2023
**Morgan Wallen**; Blake Shelton; Kane Brown; Kelsea Ballerini; Lainey Wilson; Luke Combs; Old Dominion; Zach Bryan	**Lainey Wilson**; Ashley McBryde; Carly Pearce; Carrie Underwood; Elle King; Kelsea Ballerini; Megan Moroney; Miranda Lambert
The Male Artist of 2023	The Group/Duo of 2023
**Jelly Roll**; Bailey Zimmerman; Blake Shelton; HARDY; Kane Brown; Luke Combs; Morgan Wallen; Zach Bryan	**Dan + Shay**; Brothers Osborne; Lady A; Little Big Town; Maddie & Tae; Old Dominion; Parmalee; The War and Treaty
The New Artist of 2023	The Album of 2023
**Jelly Roll**; Bailey Zimmerman; Corey Kent; ERNEST; Ingrid Andress; Megan Moroney; Priscilla Block; Zach Bryan	**One Thing at a Time – Morgan Wallen**; Bell Bottom Country – Lainey Wilson; Different Man – Kane Brown; Gettin' Old – Luke Combs; Religiously. The Album. – Bailey Zimmerman; Rolling Up the Welcome Mat – Kelsea Ballerini; the mockingbird & THE CROW – HARDY; Whitsitt Chapel – Jelly Roll
The Song of 2023	The Collaboration Song of 2023
**"Need a Favor" – Jelly Roll**; "Fast Car" – Luke Combs; "Last Night" – Morgan Wallen; "Love You Anyway" – Luke Combs; "Tennessee Orange" – Megan Moroney; "Thank God" – Kane Brown and Katelyn Brown; "Thinkin' Bout Me" – Morgan Wallen; "wait in the truck" – HARDY (feat. Lainey Wilson)	**"Save Me" – Jelly Roll (with Lainey Wilson)**; "Beer With My Friends" – Kenny Chesney and Old Dominion; "Cowgirls" – Morgan Wallen (feat. ERNEST); "red" – HARDY (feat. Morgan Wallen); "Thank God" – Kane Brown and Katelyn Brown; "wait in the truck" – HARDY (feat. Lainey Wilson); "We Don't Fight Anymore" – Carly Pearce and Chris Stapleton; "You, Me, and Whiskey" – Justin Moore and Priscilla Block
The Crossover Song of 2023	The Music Video of 2023
**"Just Say I'm Sorry" – P!nk and Chris Stapleton**; "Dawns" – Zach Bryan (feat. Maggie Rogers); "Life Goes On" – Ed Sheeran (feat. Luke Combs); "Seasons" – Bebe Rexha and Dolly Parton; "Texas" – Jessie Murph (feat. Maren Morris); "That's Not How This Works" – Charlie Puth (feat. Dan + Shay); "UNHEALTHY" – Anne-Marie (feat. Shania Twain); "Wasted" – Diplo (feat. Kodak Black and Koe Wetzel)	**"Wait in the Truck" – HARDY (feat. Lainey Wilson)**; "In Your Love" – Tyler Childers; "Need a Favor" – Jelly Roll; "Tennessee Orange" – Megan Moroney; "Thank God" – Kane Brown and Katelyn Brown; "Thought You Should Know" – Morgan Wallen; "Where We Started" – Thomas Rhett and Katy Perry; "You Proof" – Morgan Wallen
The Concert Tour of 2023	The Social Country Star of 2023
**Morgan Wallen, One Night at a Time World Tour**; Blake Shelton, Back to the Honky Tonk Tour; Carrie Underwood, Denim & Rhinestones Tour; Chris Stapleton, All-American Road Show Tour; Kenny Chesney, I Go Back 2023 Tour; Luke Combs, World Tour; Shania Twain, Queen of Me Tour; Zach Bryan, The Burn, Burn, Burn Tour	**Blake Shelton**; Bailey Zimmerman; Carrie Underwood; Dolly Parton; Kelsea Ballerini; Luke Combs; Morgan Wallen; Shania Twain

=== Special awards ===
Country Icon Award	Country Champion Award
**Toby Keith**	**Wynonna Judd**

== Nominations and Wins ==
Artists with multiple nominations
Nominations	Artist
11	Morgan Wallen
8	Luke Combs
7	Lainey Wilson
6	Kane Brown
6	HARDY
6	Jelly Roll
5	Zach Bryan
4	Kelsea Ballerini
4	Megan Moroney
4	Blake Shelton
4	Bailey Zimmerman
3	Old Dominion
3	Chris Stapleton
3	Shania Twain
3	Carrie Underwood
2	Priscilla Block
2	Kenny Chesney
2	Dan + Shay
2	Dolly Parton

Artists with multiple wins
Wins	Artist
4	Jelly Roll
3	Morgan Wallen
3	Lainey Wilson
