= Minimum Wage (song) =

Single by Blake Shelton

from the album Body Language
- Released: January 15, 2021
- Genre: Country
- Length: 3:48
- Label: Warner Nashville; Ten Point
- Songwriters: Corey Crowder; Jesse Frasure; Nicolle Galyon
- Producer: Scott Hendricks

Blake Shelton singles chronology
"Happy Anywhere" (2020)	"Minimum Wage" (2021)	"Then a Girl Walks In" (2021)

"Minimum Wage" is a song recorded by American country music singer Blake Shelton, serving as the second single from his twelfth studio album Body Language. It was released on January 15, 2021 through Warner Records. The song was produced by Scott Hendricks and written by Corey Crowder, Jesse Frasure, and Nicolle Galyon. Following the live debut of "Minimum Wage" on December 31, 2020, various music critics and the general public described the money-centric lyrics as insensitive and tone deaf, amidst economic consequences of the COVID-19 pandemic. Shelton later addressed the criticism, revealing he felt listeners misinterpreted the song.

== Background and release ==
"Minimum Wage" was released for digital download and streaming in various countries on January 15, 2021, through Warner Records. It was released to country radio stations in the United States on the same day as the lead single for his upcoming twelfth studio album. The song was produced by Scott Hendricks and written by Corey Crowder, Jesse Frasure, and Nicolle Galyon. It marks Shelton's first song with Galyon, and regarding the collaboration, he noted: "I think I drift towards songwriters more than they drift towards me. Because certain writers are really great at writing about specific things, and depending on where I’m at in my life and what I’m doing, I’ll try to find those songs."

"Minimum Wage" was accompanied by the release of a lyric video that was uploaded to Shelton's YouTube channel.

== Composition and lyrics ==
Musically, "Minimum Wage" is a classic-sounding country love song. Jon Freeman from Rolling Stone said the song "borrow[s] a little of its verse rhythm and structure" from the Rolling Stones' 1968 song "Sympathy for the Devil"; he also explained that he found the lyrics to be "about love, not working-class wages".

The lyrics to "Minimum Wage" were inspired by Shelton's 2020 engagement to American singer and songwriter, Gwen Stefani. According to Shelton, the song's lyrics explain that regardless of one's financial status, "as long as you have love and you're happy at the end of the day, that's all any of us can really hope for". He reflected that the song recalled his youthful days as a performer, when he was financially unstable and would have to decide between spending his money on rent payments or alcohol.

== Critical reception ==
After its live premiere on December 31, 2020, "Minimum Wage" was met with strongly negative reviews from music critics and the general public, who called the song tone deaf and offensive. Rania Aniftos from Billboard stated that the "Your love is money / Yeah, your love can make a man feel rich on minimum wage" lyrics caused the controversy, which critics referred to as insensitive, noting Shelton's net worth of US$100 million and how the song was released during the COVID-19 pandemic, which left many US citizens unemployed. USA Today's Jenna Ryu wrote that the negative reactions "pointed out the irony of a wealthy celebrity romanticizing minimum wage," referencing Shelton's relationship with Stefani. Fans of Shelton were divided by the track, with some posting in support of it on Twitter, according to Lindsay Lowe from Today. American singer Ronnie Dunn came to Shelton's defense on his Instagram account, writing that the criticism was part of a "misguided social issue" and encouraged those who disliked the song to "read the full lyrics" to better understand Shelton's intentions.

=== Shelton's response ===
Initially, Shelton did not respond directly to the widespread criticism surrounding "Minimum Wage", but a post on his Twitter account published on January 6, 2021, reading "Bring it on 2021". was considered his acknowledgment of it. He formally responded to the tone-deaf claims in an interview with CMT's Alison Bonaguro, published on January 14. Shelton revealed that he chose to record the song because he "related to the lyrics so much" and "just like probably 95 percent of artists out there, [he] struggled for so long to get by". Additionally, he explained he was not surprised that some listeners had misinterpreted the song, citing: "these days, there are people out there who don’t want to know the truth. They just want to hear what they want to hear, and they want to pick a fight".

== Credits and personnel ==
Credits adapted from Tidal.

- Blake Shelton – lead vocals
- Corey Crowder – writer
- Jesse Frasure – writer
- Nicolle Galyon – writer
- Scott Hendricks – producer, additional engineer, digital editor
- Scott Johnson – assistant producer
- Justin Niebank – audio engineer, mixing engineer, programmer
- Drew Bollman – assistant engineer
- Josh Ditty – assistant engineer
- Andrew Mendelson – mastering engineer
- Blake Bollinger – programmer, synthesizer
- Nir Z – programmer, drums
- Bryan Sutton – acoustic guitar
- Gordon Mote – piano, Hammond B3 organ
- Kara Britz – backing vocals
- Jimmie Lee Sloas – bass guitar
- Tom Bukovac – electric guitar
- Troy Lancaster – electric guitar
- Russ Pahl – pedal steel guitar

== Charts ==
=== Weekly charts ===
Weekly chart performance for "Minimum Wage"
Chart (2021)	Peak position
Australia Country (The Music Network)	1
Canada Hot 100 (Billboard)	58
Canada Country (Billboard)	9
US Billboard Hot 100	67
US Country Airplay (Billboard)	9
US Hot Country Songs (Billboard)	12

=== Year-end charts ===
Year-end chart performance for "Minimum Wage"
Chart (2021)	Position
US Country Airplay (Billboard)	39
US Hot Country Songs (Billboard)	43

== Release history ==
Release dates and formats for "Minimum Wage"
Region	Date	Format(s)	Label	Ref.
Various	January 15, 2021	Digital download; streaming	Warner	
United States	January 15, 2021	Country radio	Warner	
