= List of Top Country Albums number ones of 2022 =

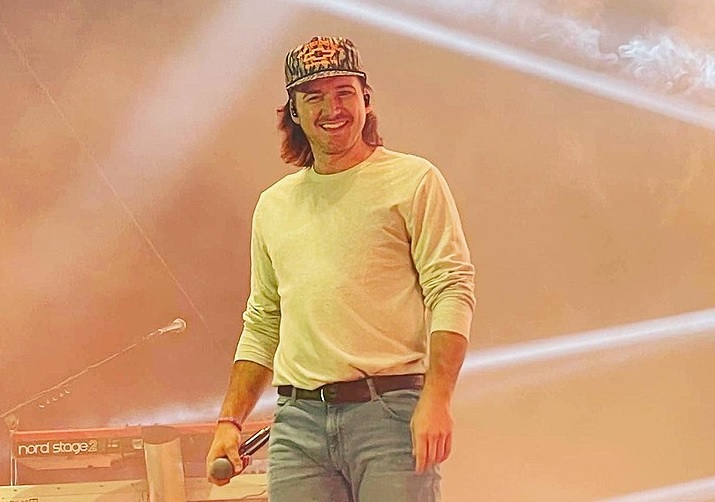
Morgan Wallen's Dangerous: The Double Album broke the record for the most weeks at number one on the chart when it spent its 51st week in the top spot in the issue dated April 2.

Top Country Albums is a chart that ranks the top-performing country music albums in the United States, published by Billboard. Chart positions are based on multi-metric consumption, blending traditional album sales, track equivalent albums, and streaming equivalent albums.

In the issue of Billboard dated January 1, Taylor Swift was at number one with Red (Taylor's Version), which retained its place atop the chart from the previous week. Two weeks later, it was replaced by Dangerous: The Double Album by Morgan Wallen, which returned to number one having already spent 39 weeks in the top spot in 2021. The album remained at number one for 20 consecutive weeks, during which it broke the record for the highest number of weeks spent at number one on the Top Country Albums chart, which had previously stood at 50.

Wallen's album was replaced at number one by American Heartbreak by Zach Bryan in the issue dated June 4, 2022. It was the first number one for Bryan; the album also topped Billboard's Top Rock Albums chart. Wallen's album returned to the peak position the following week and spent four weeks atop the chart before being displaced by Growin' Up by Luke Combs in the issue dated July 9. Growin' Up spent only a single week in the top spot, in contrast to the singer's previous album, 2019's What You See Is What You Get, which spent 37 weeks at number one. Wallen's album once again returned to number one the following week and as of the issue dated December 31 had spent a total of 88 weeks atop the chart.

== Chart history ==
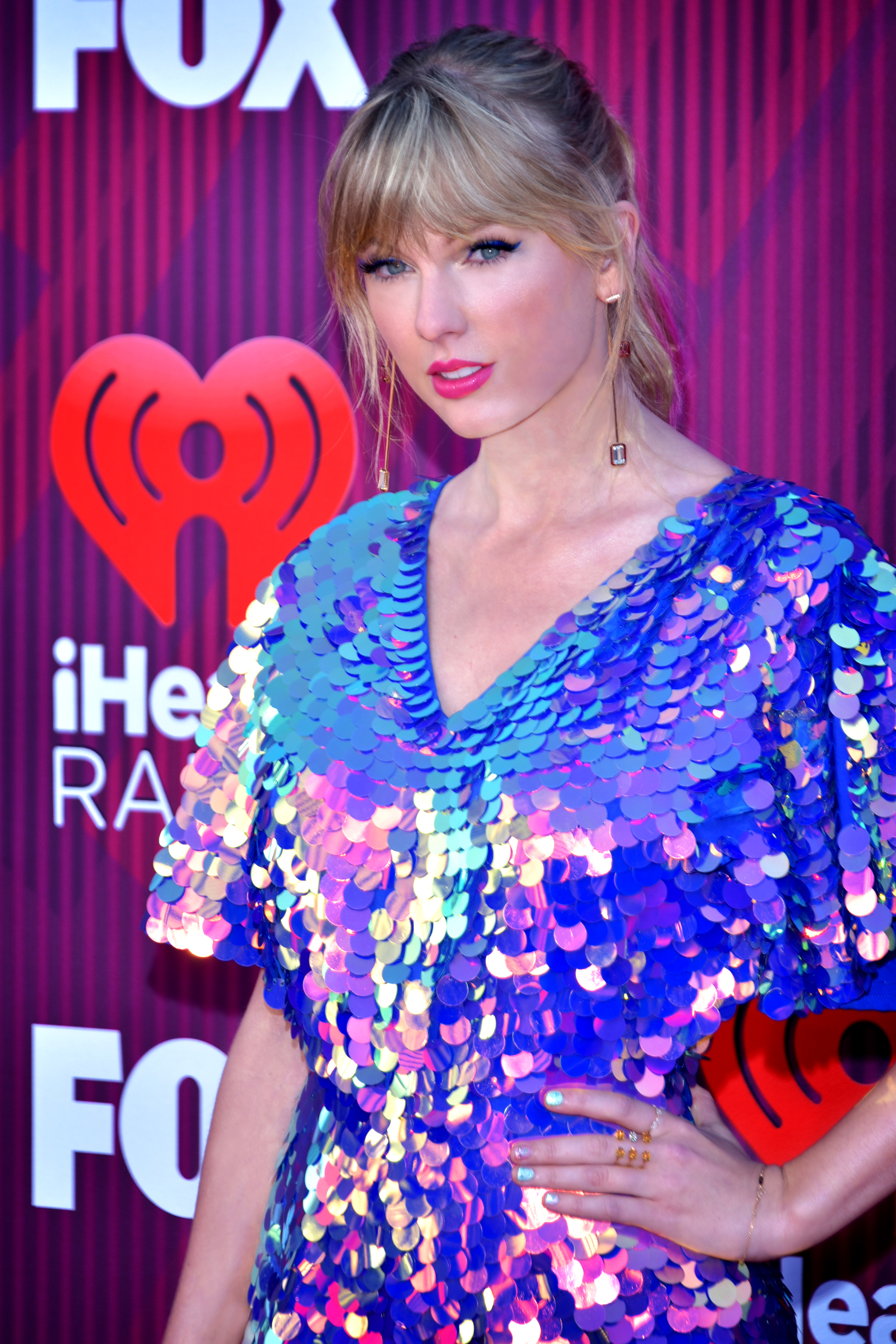
Taylor Swift was at number one on the first chart of the year.

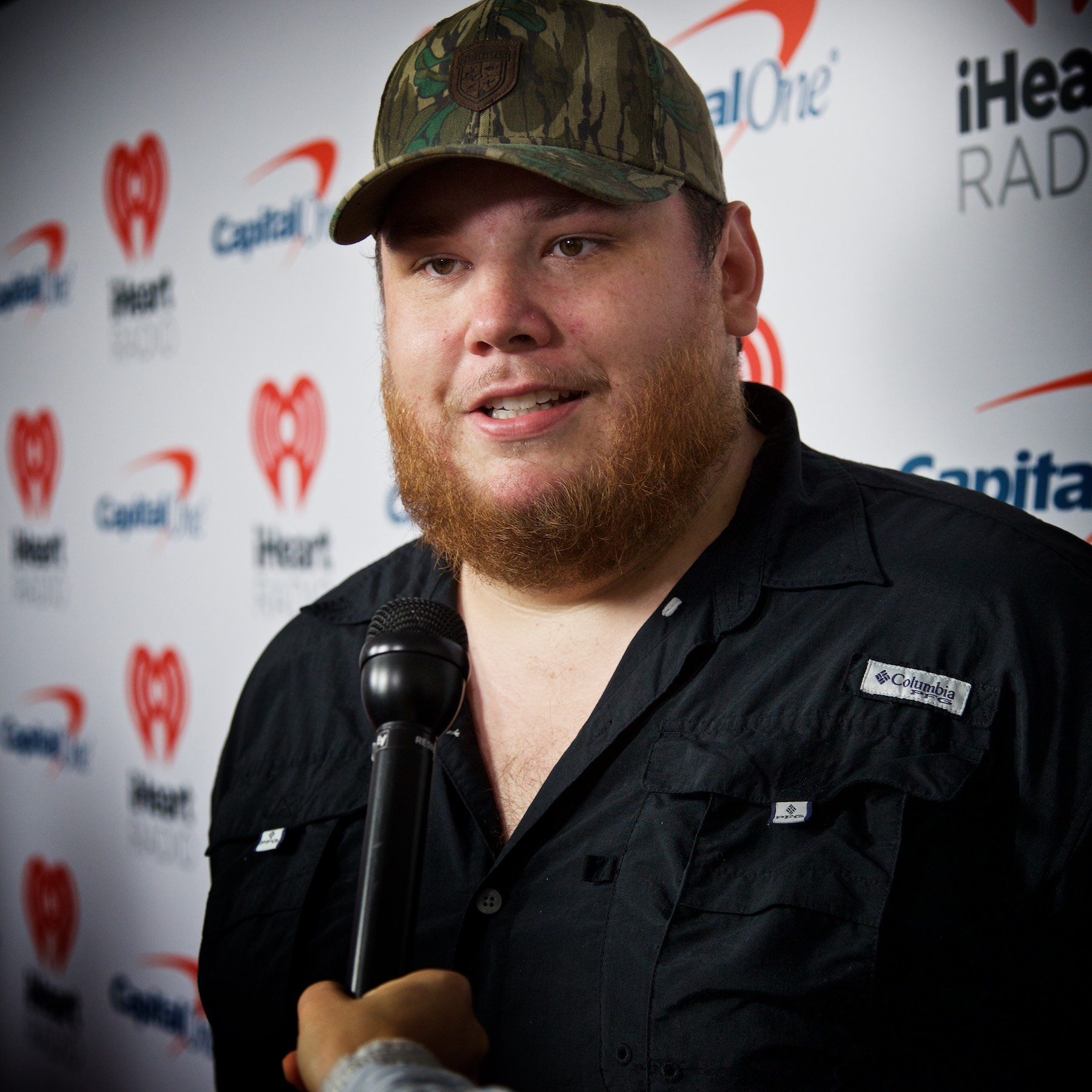
Luke Combs topped the chart in July with his album Growin' Up.

Issue date	Title	Artist(s)	Ref.
January 1	Red (Taylor's Version)	Taylor Swift	
January 8	Red (Taylor's Version)	Taylor Swift	
January 15	Dangerous: The Double Album	Morgan Wallen	
January 22	Dangerous: The Double Album	Morgan Wallen	
January 29	Dangerous: The Double Album	Morgan Wallen	
February 5	Dangerous: The Double Album	Morgan Wallen	
February 12	Dangerous: The Double Album	Morgan Wallen	
February 19	Dangerous: The Double Album	Morgan Wallen	
February 26	Dangerous: The Double Album	Morgan Wallen	
March 5	Dangerous: The Double Album	Morgan Wallen	
March 12	Dangerous: The Double Album	Morgan Wallen	
March 19	Dangerous: The Double Album	Morgan Wallen	
March 26	Dangerous: The Double Album	Morgan Wallen	
April 2	Dangerous: The Double Album	Morgan Wallen	
April 9	Dangerous: The Double Album	Morgan Wallen	
April 16	Dangerous: The Double Album	Morgan Wallen	
April 23	Dangerous: The Double Album	Morgan Wallen	
April 30	Dangerous: The Double Album	Morgan Wallen	
May 7	Dangerous: The Double Album	Morgan Wallen	
May 14	Dangerous: The Double Album	Morgan Wallen	
May 21	Dangerous: The Double Album	Morgan Wallen	
May 28	Dangerous: The Double Album	Morgan Wallen	
June 4	American Heartbreak	Zach Bryan	
June 11	Dangerous: The Double Album	Morgan Wallen	
June 18	Dangerous: The Double Album	Morgan Wallen	
June 25	Dangerous: The Double Album	Morgan Wallen	
July 2	Dangerous: The Double Album	Morgan Wallen	
July 9	Growin' Up	Luke Combs	
July 16	Dangerous: The Double Album	Morgan Wallen	
July 23	Dangerous: The Double Album	Morgan Wallen	
July 30	Dangerous: The Double Album	Morgan Wallen	
August 6	Dangerous: The Double Album	Morgan Wallen	
August 13	Dangerous: The Double Album	Morgan Wallen	
August 20	Dangerous: The Double Album	Morgan Wallen	
August 27	Dangerous: The Double Album	Morgan Wallen	
September 3	Dangerous: The Double Album	Morgan Wallen	
September 10	Dangerous: The Double Album	Morgan Wallen	
September 17	Dangerous: The Double Album	Morgan Wallen	
September 24	Dangerous: The Double Album	Morgan Wallen	
October 1	Dangerous: The Double Album	Morgan Wallen	
October 8	Dangerous: The Double Album	Morgan Wallen	
October 15	Dangerous: The Double Album	Morgan Wallen	
October 22	Dangerous: The Double Album	Morgan Wallen	
October 29	Dangerous: The Double Album	Morgan Wallen	
November 5	Dangerous: The Double Album	Morgan Wallen	
November 12	Dangerous: The Double Album	Morgan Wallen	
November 19	Dangerous: The Double Album	Morgan Wallen	
November 26	Dangerous: The Double Album	Morgan Wallen	
December 3	Dangerous: The Double Album	Morgan Wallen	
December 10	Dangerous: The Double Album	Morgan Wallen	
December 17	Dangerous: The Double Album	Morgan Wallen	
December 24	Dangerous: The Double Album	Morgan Wallen	
December 31	Dangerous: The Double Album	Morgan Wallen	

== See also ==
- 2022 in country music
- List of Billboard number-one country songs of 2022
