= Tyler Hubbard (album) =

Studio album by Tyler Hubbard
- Released: January 27, 2023
- Genre: Country
- Length: 56:53
- Label: Hubbard House; EMI Nashville
- Producer: Tyler Hubbard; Jordan Schmidt; Jesse Frasure

Tyler Hubbard chronology
Tyler Hubbard (2023)	Strong (2024)

Singles from Tyler Hubbard
- 1. "5 Foot 9" Released: May 23, 2022; 2. "Dancin' in the Country" Released: November 21, 2022

Tyler Hubbard is the debut solo studio album by American country music singer Tyler Hubbard. It was released on January 27, 2023, by EMI Nashville and Hubbard House Records.

== Content ==
From 2010 to 2022, Hubbard was one-half of the duo Florida Georgia Line alongside Brian Kelley. Tyler Hubbard is his first solo release since the duo went on hiatus. The album includes the singles "5 Foot 9" and "Dancin' in the Country": both charting within the Top 25 of the Billboard Hot 100. Hubbard co-produced the project with Jordan Schmidt.

== Critical reception ==
Rating it 3.5 out of 5 stars, Stephen Thomas Erlewine of AllMusic considered Hubbard "lighter on his feet" than he did as a member of Florida Georgia Line. He also described the album's sound as "chill and bright".

== Track listing ==
All tracks are written by Tyler Hubbard, with additional co-writers as noted.

No.	Title	Writer(s)	Length
1.	"Dancin' in the Country"	Keith Urban; Ross Copperman; Jon Nite	2:59
2.	"5 Foot 9"	Jaren Johnston; Chase McGill	3:09
3.	"Baby Gets Her Lovin'"	Jesse Frasure; Canaan Smith	3:21
4.	"Everybody Needs a Bar"	Jordan Schmidt; Zach Kale	3:23
5.	"Me for Me"	Thomas Rhett; Russell Dickerson	2:54
6.	"Tough"	Schmidt; Bebe Rexha	2:53
7.	"I'm the Only One"	Chris Loocke; Rhett Akins	2:48
8.	"She Can"	Parker Welling; Casey Brown	3:36
9.	"Small Town Me"	Chris Lacorte	3:16
10.	"Inside and Out"	Schmidt; Trevor Rosen; Brad Tursi	3:05
11.	"Out This Way"	Lacorte	2:57
12.	"By the Way"	Smith; Corey Crowder	2:33
13.	"Paradise"	Kale; Rodney Clawson	3:18
14.	"How Red"	Andy Albert; Tofer Brown	3:03
15.	"35's"	Schmidt; Michael Tyler	2:54
16.	"Leave Me Alone"	Ben Johnson; Ashley Gorley	3:38
17.	"Miss My Daddy"		3:44
18.	"Way Home"	Crowder; Smith	3:09
Total length:			56:53

== Charts ==
=== Weekly charts ===
Weekly chart performance for Tyler Hubbard
Chart (2023)	Peak position
Canadian Albums (Billboard)	90
US Billboard 200	40
US Top Country Albums (Billboard)	8

=== Year-end charts ===
Year-end chart performance for Tyler Hubbard
Chart (2023)	Position
US Billboard 200	199
US Top Country Albums (Billboard)	35

== Certifications ==
Certifications for Tyler Hubbard
Region	Certification	Certified units/sales
Canada (Music Canada)	Gold	40,000^{‡}
United States (RIAA)	Gold	500,000^{‡}
^{‡} Sales+streaming figures based on certification alone.
