= No Body =

Single by Blake Shelton
- Released: August 22, 2022
- Genre: Country
- Length: 3:27
- Label: Warner Nashville
- Songwriters: Rodney Clawson; Chris Tompkins; Josh Kear
- Producer: Scott Hendricks

Blake Shelton singles chronology
"Come Back as a Country Boy" (2021)	"No Body" (2022)	"Purple Irises" (2024)

"No Body" is a song written by Rodney Clawson, Chris Tompkins, and Josh Kear, and recorded by American country music singer Blake Shelton.

== History ==
The song uses references to country music of the 1990s, including "Boot Scootin' Boogie" by Brooks & Dunn, to express the male narrator's interest in a potential lover. According to Shelton, he chose to record the song because said references made him feel nostalgic for the music he listened to prior to moving to Nashville, Tennessee at the beginning of his career in 2001.

When filming the music video, Shelton wore a cowboy hat and a fake mullet, to mimic the appearance the singer had very early in his career.

== Chart performance ==
=== Weekly charts ===
Weekly chart performance for "No Body"
Chart (2022–2023)	Peak position
Canada Hot 100 (Billboard)	76
Canada Country (Billboard)	7
US Bubbling Under Hot 100 (Billboard)	15
US Country Airplay (Billboard)	18
US Hot Country Songs (Billboard)	25

=== Year-end charts ===
Year-end chart performance for "No Body"
Chart (2023)	Position
US Country Airplay (Billboard)	60
US Hot Country Songs (Billboard)	95
