= Happy Anywhere =

2020 single by Blake Shelton featuring Gwen Stefani

Single by Blake Shelton featuring Gwen Stefani

from the album Body Language
- Released: July 24, 2020
- Recorded: 2020
- Genre: Country
- Length: 2:50
- Label: Warner Nashville; Ten Point
- Songwriters: Ross Copperman; Josh Osborne; Matt Jenkins
- Producer: Scott Hendricks

Blake Shelton singles chronology
| "Tuesday I'll Be Gone" (2020) | "Happy Anywhere" (2020) | "Minimum Wage" (2021) |

Gwen Stefani singles chronology
| "Nobody but You" (2020) | "Happy Anywhere" (2020) | "Here This Christmas" (2020) |

Music video
- "Happy Anywhere" on YouTube

"Happy Anywhere" is a song recorded by American country music singer Blake Shelton that features guest vocals from his wife, American singer and songwriter Gwen Stefani. It was released in July 2020 as the lead single from his twelfth studio album Body Language. It was produced by Scott Hendricks and was written by Ross Copperman, Josh Osborne, and Matt Jenkins. Their fourth collaboration and released directly after their duet "Nobody but You", "Happy Anywhere" was released as a single via digital download and streaming on July 24, 2020, by Warner Records. To promote the song, Shelton's official website launched a contest where fans could upload pictures of themselves with their loved ones.

Musically, "Happy Anywhere" is an upbeat country duet with similarities to their previous collaborations. The lyrics pertain to the couple's personal relationship and describe being able to find happiness anywhere, which alludes to the consequences of the COVID-19 pandemic. In the United States, the song peaked at number 32 on the Billboard Hot 100 and had first week sales of 27,000 copies. It also reached number two on the main Digital Song Sales chart in the US, blocked from the top spot by Taylor Swift's 2020 single "Cardigan". In Canada, "Happy Anywhere" entered several of the country's Billboard charts.

An accompanying music video for the song was released the same day as the song and was produced by Todd Stefani, Gwen's brother. The clip is a montage of home video footage captured by Shelton and Stefani throughout their relationship.

== Background and release ==
In December 2019, Shelton and Stefani released their collaboration "Nobody but You", a newly recorded track for Shelton's third compilation album, Fully Loaded: God's Country (2019). The song was later released as a single from the project in January 2020, and achieved significant commercial success in the United States, where it topped Billboard's Country Airplay and Digital Songs charts and became Stefani's highest-charting effort on the Billboard Hot 100 since 2007. Following the impact of his previous collaboration with Stefani, Shelton commented: "Even though Gwen and I just had a single out, we decided that, under the circumstances, this year ... man, there's never been a better time for 'Happy Anywhere'." Shelton first teased the release on July 20, 2020, in an official press release. That same day, he unveiled the single cover art via his official Instagram account. He also confirmed Stefani's involvement with the track and stated it was inspired by the events of the COVID-19 pandemic. The song was written by Ross Copperman, Josh Osborne, and Matt Jenkins.

The song was released to music retailers for digital download and streaming on July 24, 2020, through Warner Records. It marks Shelton and Stefani's fourth collaboration, following "Go Ahead and Break My Heart" (2016), "You Make It Feel Like Christmas" (2017), and "Nobody but You". In the United States, it was sent to country radio outlets for airplay the next day. In September 2020, Shelton's official website announced a contest where fans could upload pictures of themselves with a "description of the person that makes you happy anywhere"; the stories were then posted on a world map on the site.

== Composition and lyrics ==
Musically, "Happy Anywhere" is an upbeat country song. The track has been described as a love song and Shelton referred to it as a "loving, feel-good tune". Stefani provides less vocals for "Happy Anywhere" than she previously did in "Nobody but You", and does not have a solo verse or chorus; however, she contributes to harmonies with Shelton.

According to the song's sheet music published by Musicnotes.com, "Happy Anywhere" is set in common time and has a moderately slow tempo with 166 beats per minute. The key of the song is in A-flat major, with the pair's vocal range spanning from E♭_{4} to E♭_{5} in scientific pitch notation. The song begins with a short instrumental intro, followed by two verses, each succeeded by a chorus. The first verse begins using the chord progressions of A♭–D♭–E♭, which are replicated during the other verses; during the chorus, the progressions transition to a structure of G-Am-Bm-C/Am.

Regarding the lyrical content of "Happy Anywhere", Shelton remarked: "We've all been in quarantine and lockdown, and hopefully we've been doing that with somebody that we really love and enjoy being around. That's what happened with Gwen and me this summer – and this entire year." Billy Dukes from Taste of Country noted how both the song's lyrical and musical structure are in line with other popular country music releases. The lyrics to "Happy Anywhere" explain that a couple can always obtain happiness regardless of the circumstances, which may be alluding to the implication of quarantine as a result of the COVID-19 pandemic. A Pinkvilla contributor wrote that the song explains that "one can be happy anywhere with the right person by their side".

== Commercial performance ==
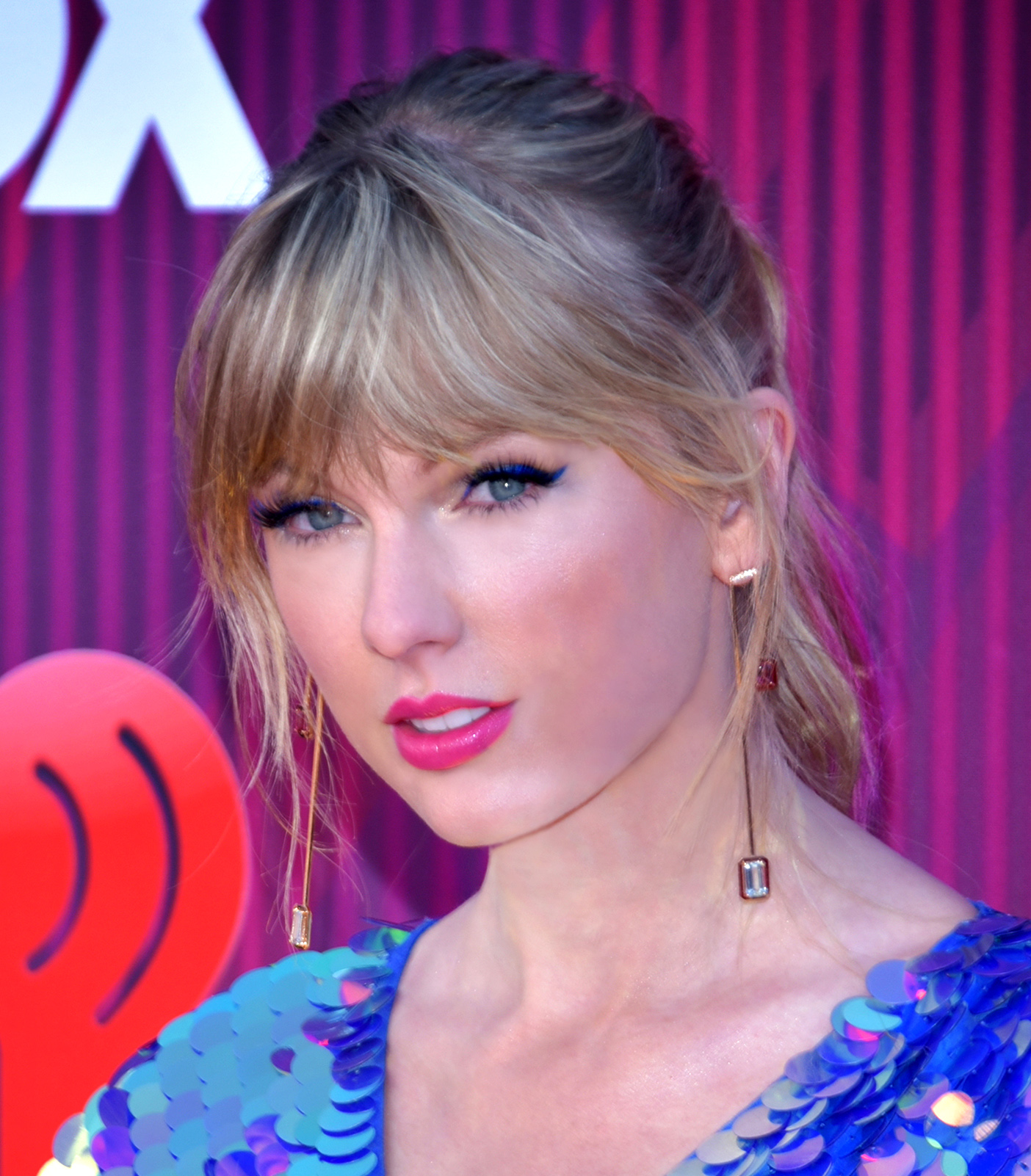
Taylor Swift (pictured) blocked "Happy Anywhere" from reaching the top spot of the Digital Songs Sales chart in the United States with her single "Cardigan" (2020).

During its first week of availability, "Happy Anywhere" entered the Billboard Hot 100 at number 56 for the week of August 7, 2020. As collaborators, it became Shelton and Stefani's highest performing entry on the Hot 100, after "Go Ahead and Break My Heart" debuted at number 70 in 2016 and "Nobody but You" entered at number 79 in 2019. The following week on the Billboard Hot 100, "Happy Anywhere" dropped 33 spots to number 89. In the United States, the song sold approximately 27,000 digital copies in terms of first week sales, for a total of 60,000 track-equivalent units. It also generated 4.5 million streams, similar to the initial impact of "Nobody but You" in the US during its first week. This led to the song appearing on the Country Streaming Songs chart, where it premiered at number 23. The song then entered several digital Billboard sales charts in the United States. It debuted atop the Country Digital Song Sales chart, becoming the pair's second number one song after "Nobody but You". It reached number two on the main Digital Song Sales chart, with Taylor Swift's 2020 single "Cardigan" preventing it from reaching the top position. "Happy Anywhere" also made an appearance on the Rolling Stone Top 100, peaking at number 63.

The song also entered several of the Billboard charts in Canada. On the main Canadian Hot 100, the song debuted at number 86, improving the debut week for "Nobody but You" when it entered at number 93. On the Hot Canadian Digital Song Sales chart, it peaked at number 2, matching the peak of "Nobody but You" as Shelton's highest-ranking entry. For the airplay-driven Canada Country chart, the song spent its first week at number 42.

== Music video ==
An accompanying music video for "Happy Anywhere" was released to Shelton's YouTube channel on July 24, 2020. The clip was produced by Todd Stefani, Gwen's younger brother, who was a guest at Shelton's Oklahoma ranch home during the COVID-19 pandemic.

== Live performances ==
It was announced on July 20, 2020, that Shelton and Stefani would perform "Happy Anywhere" live during an episode of Today in the United States. The performance is to be broadcast as part of the Summer 2020 Citi Music Series promotional concert series. It is also expected to be sung live during Shelton's Encore Drive-In Nights show, a concert that will be shown at drive-in theaters throughout the United States on July 25, 2020. On December 14, 2020, Shelton and Stefani performed on the first night of The Voice Season 19 Finale.

== Personnel ==
Credits by AllMusic

- Tom Bukovac – electric guitar
- Troy Lancaster – electric guitar
- Gordon Mote – Hammond organ
- Justin Niebank – programming
- Russ Pahl – pedal steel guitar
- Blake Shelton – lead vocals
- Jimmie Lee Sloas – bass guitar
- Gwen Stefani – duet vocals
- Ilya Toshinsky – banjo, acoustic guitar
- Nir Z. – drums, percussion, programming

== Charts ==
=== Weekly charts ===
Weekly chart performance for "Happy Anywhere"
| Chart (2020–2021) | Peak position |
|---|---|
| Australia Country (The Music Network) | 2 |
| Canada Hot 100 (Billboard) | 41 |
| Canada Country (Billboard) | 1 |
| US Billboard Hot 100 | 32 |
| US Country Airplay (Billboard) | 1 |
| US Hot Country Songs (Billboard) | 3 |
| US Rolling Stone Top 100 | 63 |

=== Year-end charts ===
Year-end chart performance for "Happy Anywhere"
| Chart (2020) | Position |
|---|---|
| US Country Airplay (Billboard) | 48 |
| US Hot Country Songs (Billboard) | 50 |

| Chart (2021) | Position |
|---|---|
| US Country Airplay (Billboard) | 45 |
| US Hot Country Songs (Billboard) | 56 |

== Certifications ==
| Region | Certification | Certified units/sales |
|---|---|---|
| Canada (Music Canada) | Platinum | 80,000^{‡} |
| United States (RIAA) | Platinum | 1,000,000^{‡} |
^{‡} Sales+streaming figures based on certification alone.

== Release history ==
Release dates and formats for "Happy Anywhere"
| Region | Date | Format(s) | Label | Ref. |
|---|---|---|---|---|
| Various | July 24, 2020 | Digital download; streaming | Warner | |
| United States | July 25, 2020 | Country radio | Warner | |
