= Next to You (Loud Luxury and Dvbbs song) =

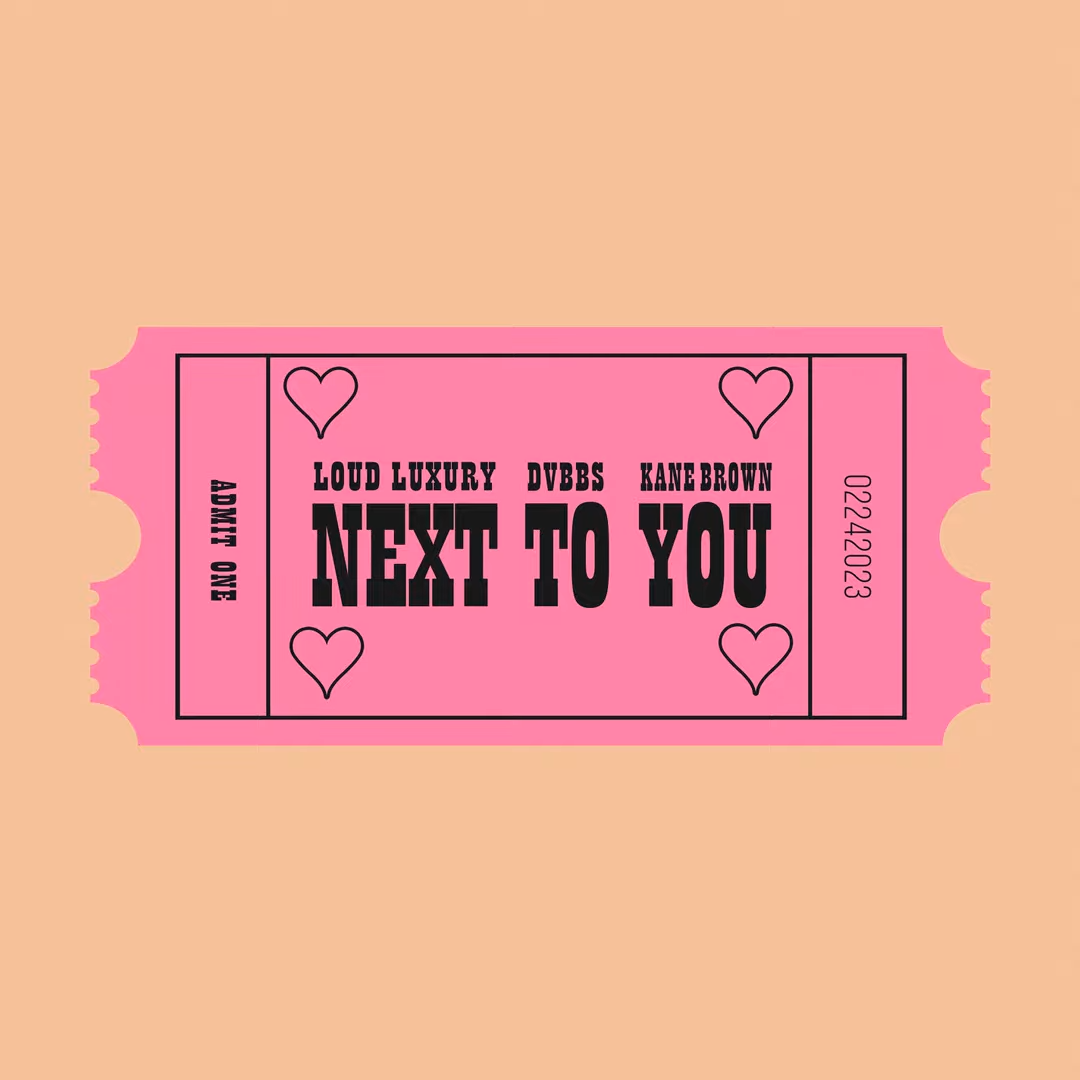

Single by Loud Luxury and Dvbbs featuring Kane Brown
- Released: February 24, 2023
- Length: 2:41
- Label: RCA Records
- Songwriters: Alexandre van den Hoef; Andrew Fedyk; Kane Brown; Joe De Pace; Chris Chronicles; James Deeghan; Shy Carter; Jimmie Deeghan; Will Weatherly
- Producers: Loud Luxury; Dvbbs

Loud Luxury singles chronology
"Afterparty" (2022)	"Next to You" (2023)	"If Only I" (2023)

Dvbbs singles chronology
"Sh Sh Sh (Hit That)" (2023)	"Next to You" (2023)	"Synergy" (2023)

Kane Brown singles chronology
"Thank God" (2022)	"Next to You" (2023)	"Bury Me in Georgia" (2023)

Lyric Video
- "Next to You" on YouTube

"Next to You" is a song by Canadian duo Loud Luxury and fellow Canadian duo Dvbbs featuring American singer Kane Brown.

== Critical reception ==
Buddy Iahn of The Music Universe referred to the song as "upbeat, infectious offering is driven by bursts of synths laced effortlessly with Brown's soulful vocals".

== Charts ==
=== Weekly charts ===
Weekly chart performance for "Next to You"
Chart (2023)	Peak position
Canada (Canadian Hot 100)	34
US Hot Dance/Electronic Songs (Billboard)	12

=== Year-end charts ===
Year-end chart performance for "Next to You"
Chart (2023)	Position
Canada (Canadian Hot 100)	66

== Certifications ==
Certifications for "Next to You"
Region	Certification	Certified units/sales
Canada (Music Canada)	Platinum	80,000^{‡}
^{‡} Sales+streaming figures based on certification alone.
