= Dancin' in the Country =

Single by Tyler Hubbard

from the album Tyler Hubbard
- Released: November 21, 2022
- Genre: Country
- Length: 2:59
- Label: Hubbard House/EMI Nashville
- Songwriters: Tyler Hubbard; Ross Copperman; Jon Nite; Keith Urban
- Producers: Tyler Hubbard; Jordan Schmidt

Tyler Hubbard singles chronology
"5 Foot 9" (2022)	"Dancin' in the Country" (2022)	"Back Then Right Now" (2023)

EP cover
- EP cover

"Dancin' in the Country" is a song by American country music singer Tyler Hubbard. It was released on November 21, 2022 as the second single from Hubbard's self-titled debut studio album. Hubbard wrote the song with Ross Copperman, Jon Nite, and Keith Urban.

== History ==
Tom Roland of Billboard described the song as "21st-century redneck disco, a four-on-the-four backbeat topped with a joyous melody, carefree lyrics and an unfettered country band".

Tyler Hubbard, best known as one half of Florida Georgia Line, wrote "Dancin' in the Country" at a songwriting session on November 3, 2021 with Ross Copperman and Jon Nite. The latter two invited Keith Urban to the session as well, and none of them knew at the time that Hubbard was seeking material for a solo career. At the time they were writing, both Hubbard and Urban thought the song would be suitable for each other to record. Copperman composed the song's rhythm section and Urban came up with the song's guitar riff, based around a C suspended second chord. Of the composition, Roland states that the song has a "hip-hop-like pre-chorus." When recording the song in the studio, Hubbard co-produced with Jordan Schmidt. Among the contributing musicians were bassist Jimmie Lee Sloas, guitarist Rob McNelley, steel guitarist Justin Schipper, and banjoist Ilya Toshinsky.

Nite said that the song's lyrics, of a romantic first encounter with a woman in a field, were inspired by his first date with his wife.

== Dancin' in the Country EP track listing ==
Prior to its release as a single, "Dancin' in the Country" was issued on a six-song extended play of the same name, which also featured Hubbard's previous solo release "5 Foot 9". Hubbard promoted his solo releases by touring with Urban on his The Speed of Now tour.

1. "Dancin' in the Country" (Hubbard, Jon Nite, Ross Copperman, Keith Urban) – 2:59
2. "Baby Gets Her Lovin'" (Hubbard, Jesse Frasure, Canaan Smith) – 3:21
3. "Everybody Needs a Bar" (Hubbard, Jordan Schmidt, Zach Kale) – 3:23
4. "Inside and Out" (Hubbard, Schmidt, Trevor Rosen, Brad Tursi) – 3:05
5. "I'm the Only One" (Hubbard, Chris Loocke, Rhett Akins) – 2:48
6. "5 Foot 9" (Hubbard, Jaren Johnston, Chase McGill) – 3:09

== Charts ==
=== Weekly charts ===
Weekly chart performance for "Dancin' in the Country"
Chart (2022–2023)	Peak position
Canada Hot 100 (Billboard)	41
Canada Country (Billboard)	1
US Billboard Hot 100	23
US Country Airplay (Billboard)	2
US Hot Country Songs (Billboard)	6

=== Year-end charts ===
2023 year-end chart performance for "Dancin' in the Country"
Chart (2023)	Position
Canada (Canadian Hot 100)	91
US Billboard Hot 100	61
US Country Airplay (Billboard)	3
US Hot Country Songs (Billboard)	20

== Certifications ==
Certifications for "Dancin' in the Country"
Region	Certification	Certified units/sales
Canada (Music Canada)	2× Platinum	160,000^{‡}
New Zealand (RMNZ)	Gold	15,000^{‡}
United States (RIAA)	3× Platinum	3,000,000^{‡}
^{‡} Sales+streaming figures based on certification alone.
