= Park (song) =

2024 single by Tyler Hubbard

Single by Tyler Hubbard

from the album Strong
- Released: June 17, 2024
- Genre: Country
- Length: 2:44
- Label: EMI Nashville
- Songwriters: Tyler Hubbard; Jesse Frasure; Ashley Gorley; Canaan Smith
- Producers: Tyler Hubbard; Jordan Schmidt

Tyler Hubbard singles chronology
"Turn" (2024)	"Park" (2024)	"After Midnight" (2025)

Music video
- "Park" on YouTube

"Park" is a song by American country music singer Tyler Hubbard from his second solo studio album, Strong (2024). It was serviced to country radio on June 17, 2024, as the album's fourth single. Hubbard wrote the song with Jesse Frasure, Ashley Gorley and Canaan Smith and produced it with Jordan Schmidt.

== Background ==
"Park" was created toward the end of a writer's retreat at the home of Jesse Frasure in Florida. A couple different teams were working on songs for Tyler Hubbard, who was moving between rooms as the songs were being developed. Frasure shared an instrumental track he had created with a "danceable tempo and a bright feel", which everyone in the room liked. Frasure and Hubbard's wives danced to it and the writers started sifting through ideas that would fit. They were considering titles as Hubbard was in the other room, with Ashley Gorley bringing up the word "park". When Hubbard returned, he approved of their work and they proceeded to develop the chorus, beginning it with the lyrics "I can drive you from this holler to Hollywood". The chorus explored the driving theme as a whole.

The song combined a programmed track with live guitars. The composers decided to create room for a guitar solo, which eventually developed into a short bridge. It used the same four chords as the rest of the song, but they were arranged in a different order. Frasure produced a "brisk, almost-skipping" demo, which became the foundation for Hubbard and Jordan Schmidt's production of the song. A start-and-stop bass hook performed by Heart bass player Tony Lucido, layers of guitars, and dramatic drum fills by Nir Z were added to the instrumental during a tracking session at the Sounds Stage in Nashville, Tennessee. Schmidt and Jonny Fung completed the guitar-layering in overdubs. Hubbard recorded the final version with relative ease and the most difficult part of the process was singing the line "All I wanna do is park" in the hook due to the harshness of the "r" sound.

The song's narrative of two lovers driving and flirting together reminded Hubbard of an incident from when he was 15, in which the police caught him making out with his 16-year-old girlfriend in her car in a church parking lot. Hubbard was escorted home by an officer and had to tell his father, who grounded him for the next month. Hubbard and his girlfriend were about a mile from his house; his father responded they should have come home and used the driveway as their retreat.

== Content ==
The two verses of the song depict the temptations of a couple in a car late at night. The narrator considers two choices of spending the night, between the thrill of racing through dirt roads and into the city and pulling over to relax together, while counting the "midnight windshield stars" and waiting for the sun to rise. In the chorus, he boasts about the speed of his car, claiming he has "700 horses under the hood" in reference to horsepower, and says he wants to park.

== Critical reception ==
Kevin John Coyne of Country Universe gave the song a "D" grade, writing that "As much as I prefer K.T. Oslin’s “Hey Bobby” over Brad Paisley’s “Mud On the Tires,” at least Paisley was able to get through his record without sounding like a sexual predator."

== Charts ==
=== Weekly charts ===
Weekly chart performance for "Park"
Chart (2024–2025)	Peak position
Canada Hot 100 (Billboard)	89
Canada Country (Billboard)	1
US Billboard Hot 100	84
US Country Airplay (Billboard)	1
US Hot Country Songs (Billboard)	24

=== Year-end charts ===
Year-end chart performance for "Park"
Chart (2025)	Position
US Country Airplay (Billboard)	11
