= Different Man =

Studio album by Kane Brown
- Released: September 9, 2022
- Genre: Country
- Length: 58:14
- Label: RCA Nashville
- Producers: Kane Brown; Dann Huff; Andrew Goldstein; Lindsay Rimes; Ilya Toshinsky

Kane Brown chronology
Mixtape, Vol. 1 (2020)	Different Man (2022)	The High Road (2025)

Singles from Different Man
- 1. "One Mississippi" Released: August 20, 2021; 2. "Like I Love Country Music" Released: May 6, 2022; 3. "Grand" Released: July 22, 2022; 4. "Thank God" Released: September 12, 2022; 5. "Bury Me in Georgia" Released: March 31, 2023

Different Man is the third studio album by American country music singer Kane Brown, released on September 9, 2022, through RCA Records Nashville. Brown co-produced the album, which was preceded by the singles "One Mississippi", "Like I Love Country Music", and "Grand", with "Thank God", a duet with his singer-songwriter wife Katelyn Brown, which impacted country radio on September 12. The songs "Leave You Alone" and "Whiskey Sour" were also released ahead of the album. The album was promoted with the Drunk or Dreamin' Tour, which ran from September 17, 2022, to September 8, 2023.

== Content ==
Brown co-produced one of his albums for the first time, which took time to adjust to, with Brown saying that "We went from a demo to a master recording to redoing everything. I was listening to the album and not liking the sounds. [...] We kept revamping things, working and finding the sound I've been looking for, adding in more rock and country sounds". The New York Times described Brown's duet with his wife Katelyn as a "folk-pop duet" and "Grand" as "post-Drake R&B", but that the album overall is "determinedly traditional", bookended odes to Brown's "rural Southern roots".

== Commercial performance ==
Different Man debuted at number five on the US Billboard 200, including number two on the Top Country Albums chart with 46,000 album equivalent units. The album also reached number six in Canada and number 17 in Australia.

== Track listing ==
Different Man track listing
No.	Title	Writer(s)	Length
1.	"Bury Me in Georgia"	Kane Brown; Josh Hoge; Matt McGinn; Jordan Schmidt	4:01
2.	"Different Man" (featuring Blake Shelton)	Brown; Christian Davis; Hoge	2:55
3.	"Like I Love Country Music"	Brown; McGinn; Taylor Phillips; Schmidt	3:54
4.	"Go Around"	Brown; Zach Beeken; Garrett Nichols; Schmidt; Ernest Keith Smith	3:23
5.	"Grand"	Brown; Kameron Alexander; Mike Posner	2:58
6.	"See You Like I Do"	Brown; Devin Dawson; McGinn; Lindsay Rimes	3:09
7.	"Thank God" (featuring Katelyn Brown)	Davis; Kyle Fishman; Jaxson Free; Hoge; Jared Mullins	2:54
8.	"Leave You Alone"	Brown; Jordan Minton; Schmidt	3:34
9.	"Riot"	Brown; Melvin Hough II; Reese Thornton; Rivelino Wouter	3:26
10.	"One Mississippi"	Brown; Jesse Frasure; Levon Gray; Smith	3:34
11.	"Drunk or Dreamin'"	Brown; Hoge; Schmidt; Smith	4:20
12.	"Losing You"	Brown; Free; Hoge	3:32
13.	"Whiskey Sour"	Adam Craig; Free; Hoge	3:31
14.	"Pop's Last Name"	Brown; Hoge; Jake Mitchell	3:33
15.	"Devil Don't Even Bother"	Brown; Cary Barlowe; Frasure; Josh Thompson	2:49
16.	"Nothin' I'd Change"	Brown; Hoge; Schmidt; Smith	3:33
17.	"Dear Georgia"	Brown; Hoge; Schmidt; Smith	3:08
Total length:			58:14

== Personnel ==
Musicians

- Kane Brown – lead vocals (all tracks), background vocals (1–4, 6, 8, 9, 11, 15–17)
- Josh Reedy – background vocals (1–4, 8–10, 12, 14, 15, 17)
- Matt McGinn – background vocals (1, 6)
- Ilya Toshinskiy – banjo (1, 4, 9, 15, 17), acoustic guitar (2–4, 7–17), ukulele (15)
- Jimmie Lee Sloas – bass guitar (1–4, 7, 9–12, 15–17)
- Aaron Sterling – drums (1–4, 6–12, 14–17), percussion (1, 2, 4, 6, 7, 12, 17); congas, shaker (11)
- Dann Huff – electric guitar (1–4, 8–10, 12, 14, 16, 17), programming (1, 3, 4, 9, 12, 15, 16), synthesizer (1, 4), Dobro (3), piano (4), mandolin (3, 17), bass guitar (9), twelve-string guitar (10, 17), acoustic guitar (14, 16)
- Derek Wells – electric guitar (1–4, 7–12, 14–17)
- Lars Thorson – fiddle (1, 9, 17)
- Charlie Judge – organ (1, 8–11, 15, 16), strings (1, 2, 8), synthesizer (1, 2, 4, 8–12, 14, 17); horn, timpani (2); piano (4, 8, 11, 15, 16), keyboards (7), celeste (16), whistles (17)
- Justin Niebank – programming (1–4, 8, 9, 11, 12, 14–17)
- David Huff – programming (1–4, 7–9, 11, 12, 14–17), synthesizer (7), slide guitar (16)
- Josh Hoge – background vocals (2)
- Paul Franklin – steel guitar (2–4, 7, 10–12, 14–17)
- Dave Cohen – organ, piano (3)
- Jordan Schmidt – background vocals (4)
- Stuart Duncan – fiddle (4, 10, 15)
- Alex Wright – synthesizer (4)
- Eric Arjes – background vocals (5)
- Andrew Goldstein – guitar, keyboards, programming (5)
- Solomon Philcox-Littlefield – acoustic guitar, electric guitar (6)
- Devin Dawson – background vocals (6)
- Lindsay Rimes – background vocals, electric guitar, keyboards, programming, synthesizer (6)
- Justin Schipper – steel guitar (6)
- Shy Carter – background vocals (7)
- Craig Young – bass guitar (8, 14)
- Jesse Frasure – programming, synthesizer (10, 11, 15); bass guitar (15)
- Trey Keller – background vocals (11, 12, 16)
- Natalie Stovall – fiddle (13)
- Ernest Keith Smith – background vocals (16)

Technical

- Kane Brown – producer (6, 13)
- Adam Ayan – mastering (1–4, 6–17)
- Dave Kutch – mastering (5)
- Drew Bollman – mixing (1, 2, 4, 7–12, 14–17), recording (2–4, 9–11, 15, 16), engineering assistance (3)
- Justin Niebank – mixing (1–4, 7–12, 14–17)
- Adam Hawkins – mixing (5)
- Jeff Braun – mixing (6, 13); vocal production, vocal engineering (5)
- Buckley Miller – recording (1, 7, 8, 12, 14, 17)
- Lindsay Rimes – recording, editing, overdub engineering, producer (6)
- Ilya Toshinskiy – recording, editing, overdub engineering, producer (13)
- Kyle Manner – recording (13)
- Chris Small – editing (1–4, 7–12, 14–17), vocal engineering (3)
- David Huff – editing (1–4, 7–12, 14–17)
- Andrew Goldstein – editing, producer (5)
- Eric Arjes – editing (5)
- Simon Philcox-Littlefield – overdub engineering (6)
- Dann Huff – overdub engineering (1, 2, 4, 7, 9, 11, 12, 14–17), producer (1–4, 7–12, 14–17)
- Jaime Sickora – overdub engineering (2)
- Russell Terrell – overdub engineering (3)
- Trey Keller – overdub engineering (11)
- Steve Marcantonio – overdub engineering (16)
- Zach Kuhlman – engineering assistance (1, 7, 12, 17)
- Eric Fleming – engineering assistance (2)
- Kam Luchterhand – engineering assistance (2, 9, 15, 16)
- Lucas Glenney-Tegtmeier – engineering assistance (2, 9, 15, 16)
- Sean Badum – engineering assistance (3, 10, 11)
- Jordan Reed – engineering assistance (8, 14)

== Charts ==
=== Weekly charts ===
Weekly chart performance for Different Man
Chart (2022)	Peak position
Australian Albums (ARIA)	17
Canadian Albums (Billboard)	6
UK Album Downloads (Official Charts)	23
US Billboard 200	5
US Top Country Albums (Billboard)	2

=== Year-end charts ===
2022 year-end chart performance for Different Man
Chart (2022)	Position
US Top Country Albums (Billboard)	44

2023 year-end chart performance for Different Man
Chart (2023)	Position
US Billboard 200	76
US Top Country Albums (Billboard)	16

2024 year-end chart performance for Different Man
Chart (2024)	Position
US Top Country Albums (Billboard)	58

== Certifications ==
Certifications and sales for Different Man
Region	Certification	Certified units/sales
Canada (Music Canada)	Platinum	80,000^{‡}
United States (RIAA)	Platinum	1,000,000^{‡}
^{‡} Sales+streaming figures based on certification alone.
