= Come Back as a Country Boy =

2021 single by Blake Shelton

Single by Blake Shelton

from the album Body Language
- Released: October 1, 2021
- Genre: Country rock
- Length: 3:41
- Label: Warner Nashville
- Songwriters: Jordan Schmidt; Josh Thompson; Michael Hardy
- Producer: Scott Hendricks

Blake Shelton singles chronology
"Then a Girl Walks In" (2021)	"Come Back as a Country Boy" (2021)	"No Body" (2022)

Music video
- "Come Back as a Country Boy" on YouTube

"Come Back as a Country Boy" is a song by American country music singer Blake Shelton. It was released on October 1, 2021, as the third single from the deluxe version of his twelfth studio album Body Language. The song was written by Jordan Schmidt, Josh Thompson and Michael Hardy, and produced by Scott Hendricks.

== Background and content ==
On September 29, 2021, Shelton posted a video on Twitter of a bonfire nearby a lake with the caption: "Oh the sweet sounds of new music coming." In a press release, Shelton explained: ""Come Back as a Country Boy" is a song about just having so much pride about being country and living the country lifestyle that, even if you come back to life, you wouldn't do it unless you could be country again... If you can't do it again — if you're lucky enough to come back to life — you'd rather just stay dead." "I think this song is an anthem for everyday hardworking country people out there, we have so much pride in who we are and what we do that, if we ever died and got the chance to live life over again, we probably wouldn't do it if we couldn't be country."

== Critical reception ==
Chris Parton of Sounds Like Nashville called the song reminiscent of Shelton's "God's Country" (2019), writing that it "mixes chest-thumping grit with stand-your-ground attitude and a comforting melody that almost feels like a lullaby".

== Charts ==
=== Weekly charts ===
Weekly chart performance for "Come Back as a Country Boy"
Chart (2021–2022)	Peak position
Canada Hot 100 (Billboard)	55
Canada Country (Billboard)	3
US Billboard Hot 100	81
US Country Airplay (Billboard)	12
US Hot Country Songs (Billboard)	18

=== Year-end charts ===
2022 year-end chart performance for "Come Back as a Country Boy"
Chart (2022)	Position
US Country Airplay (Billboard)	43
US Hot Country Songs (Billboard)	52

== Release history ==
Release history for "Come Back as a Country Boy"
Region	Date	Format	Label	Ref.
Various	October 1, 2021	Digital download; streaming	Warner Records Nashville	
United States	October 4, 2021	Country radio	Warner Records Nashville	
