= Thank God (Kane Brown and Katelyn Brown song) =

Single by Kane Brown and Katelyn Brown

from the album Different Man
- Released: September 12, 2022
- Genre: Country
- Length: 2:54
- Label: RCA Nashville
- Songwriters: Christian Davis; Kyle Fishman; Jaxson Free; Josh Hoge; Jared Mullins
- Producers: Kane Brown; Dann Huff

Kane Brown singles chronology
"Grand" (2022)	"Thank God" (2022)	"Next to You" (2023)

"Thank God" is a song by American country music singer Kane Brown. It is a duet with his wife, Katelyn Brown. It was released on September 12, 2022, as the fourth single from Kane Brown's third studio album Different Man.

== Content and history ==
Christian Davis, Kyle Fishman, Jaxson Free, Josh Hoge, and Jared Mullins composed the song. According to Kane Brown, he was recommended the song by Hoge, who is a friend of his. Upon listening to the demo, Brown chose to include his wife Katelyn as a duet vocalist. Katelyn had been a contemporary R&B musician prior to marrying him in 2019, but had not been featured on any of his songs prior.

An uncredited review in Music Mayhem described the song as having "beautiful harmonies" between the Browns. E! Online described the song as having a theme of how "grateful" the two are to be in love with each other.

== Commercial performance ==
The week of the song's release, it debuted on multiple Billboard charts dated for the week ending September 24, 2022. It entered the Billboard Hot 100 at number 22, Hot Country Songs at number 5, and ascended from number 49 to 35 on Country Airplay. According to Billboard data for this week, the song was streamed over eleven million times, and was the most-added song to country radio playlists. Upon doing so, it became the first chart entry for Katelyn, as well as the highest charting country song by a married couple since "Chasing After You" by Ryan Hurd and Maren Morris in 2021. It later reached number one on the Country Airplay chart in February 2023, making it the second duet by a married couple to top the chart, following Tim McGraw and Faith Hill's "It's Your Love" in 1997.

In addition to this, Brown released a music video, directed by Alex Alvga.

== Charts ==
=== Weekly charts ===
Weekly chart performance for "Thank God"
Chart (2022–2023)	Peak position
Canada Hot 100 (Billboard)	43
Canada AC (Billboard)	17
Canada Country (Billboard)	3
Canada Hot AC (Billboard)	37
Global 200 (Billboard)	62
US Billboard Hot 100	13
US Adult Contemporary (Billboard)	20
US Adult Pop Airplay (Billboard)	10
US Country Airplay (Billboard)	1
US Hot Country Songs (Billboard)	2
US Pop Airplay (Billboard)	16

=== Year-end charts ===
2022 year-end chart performance for "Thank God"
Chart (2022)	Position
US Digital Song Sales (Billboard)	54
US Hot Country Songs (Billboard)	64

2023 year-end chart performance for "Thank God"
Chart (2023)	Position
US Billboard Hot 100	23
US Adult Contemporary (Billboard)	44
US Adult Top 40 (Billboard)	36
US Country Airplay (Billboard)	11
US Hot Country Songs (Billboard)	7
US Mainstream Top 40 (Billboard)	45

== Certifications ==
Certifications and sales for "Thank God"
Region	Certification	Certified units/sales
Canada (Music Canada)	3× Platinum	240,000^{‡}
United States (RIAA)	3× Platinum	3,000,000^{‡}
^{‡} Sales+streaming figures based on certification alone.
