= Bury Me in Georgia =

Single by Kane Brown

from the album Different Man
- Released: March 31, 2023
- Genre: Country
- Length: 4:01 (album version); 2:51 (single version)
- Label: RCA Nashville
- Songwriters: Kane Brown; Josh Hoge; Matt McGinn; Jordan Schmidt
- Producer: Dann Huff

Kane Brown singles chronology
"Next to You" (2023)	"Bury Me in Georgia" (2023)	"I Can Feel It" (2023)

"Bury Me in Georgia" is a song by American country music singer Kane Brown. It was released on March 31, 2023 as the fifth single from his third studio album Different Man. Brown wrote the song with Josh Hoge, Matt McGinn, and Jordan Schmidt.

== History ==
The song was described by Taste of Country writer Billy Dukes as having "instrumental solos and heavy vocal distortion", with an alternate mix for country radio which lessens these two elements. Lyrically, the song is about the singer's plans in case of his death, which include a request to be buried in the state of Georgia.

In May 2023, Brown performed the song at the Academy of Country Music awards.

== Charts ==
=== Weekly charts ===
Weekly chart performance for "Bury Me in Georgia"
Chart (2023)	Peak position
Canada Hot 100 (Billboard)	58
Canada Country (Billboard)	1
US Billboard Hot 100	34
US Country Airplay (Billboard)	1
US Hot Country Songs (Billboard)	8

=== Year-end charts ===
Year-end chart performance for "Bury Me in Georgia"
Chart (2023)	Position
US Billboard Hot 100	89
US Country Airplay (Billboard)	21
US Hot Country Songs (Billboard)	28

== Certifications ==
Certifications for "Bury Me in Georgia"
Region	Certification	Certified units/sales
Canada (Music Canada)	Platinum	80,000^{‡}
United States (RIAA)	Platinum	1,000,000^{‡}
^{‡} Sales+streaming figures based on certification alone.
