= 5 Foot 9 =

Single by Tyler Hubbard

from the album Tyler Hubbard
- Released: May 23, 2022
- Genre: Country
- Length: 3:09
- Label: EMI Nashville
- Songwriters: Tyler Hubbard; Chase McGill; Jaren Johnston
- Producers: Tyler Hubbard; Jordan Schmidt

Tyler Hubbard singles chronology
"Undivided" (2021)	"5 Foot 9" (2022)	"Dancin' in the Country" (2022)

"5 Foot 9" is a song by American country music singer Tyler Hubbard, best known as one-half of the duo Florida Georgia Line. The song is Hubbard's first release as a solo artist. It was released on May 23, 2022 as the lead single from his self-titled debut solo album.

== Content ==
Tyler Hubbard, one-half of Florida Georgia Line, wrote the song in 2021 with Chase McGill and The Cadillac Three member Jaren Johnston. At the time, Hubbard had not told the other two he was planning to release solo material outside Florida Georgia Line. According to him, the three writers originally did not have any concepts in mind until Johnston began playing a guitar riff. The three then decided to make a list of things they considered "good", such as "dry wood makes good fires". They then added the line "God makes 5 foot 9, brown eyes in a sundress", which was inspired by Hubbard's wife, Hayley. Her actual height is actually five foot ten, but Hubbard decided to keep it as is because it rhymes well with the other lines. Johnston and Hubbard then recorded a demo, which they took to producer Jordan Schmidt. Among the musicians on the final recording was Ilya Toshinsky, who played acoustic guitar, banjo, and Dobro on the song. Schmidt compared the final recording to a Nickel Creek song.

== Chart performance ==
"5 Foot 9" reached number one on the Billboard Country Airplay chart dated November 19, 2022, becoming Hubbard's first number one single as a solo artist after having previously spent time at number one as a member of Florida Georgia Line, and making him the first male artist from a duo or group to top the chart with a solo single.

== Charts ==
=== Weekly charts ===
Weekly chart performance for "5 Foot 9"
Chart (2022)	Peak position
Canada Hot 100 (Billboard)	28
Canada Country (Billboard)	1
Global 200 (Billboard)	140
US Billboard Hot 100	22
US Country Airplay (Billboard)	1
US Hot Country Songs (Billboard)	5

=== Year-end charts ===
2022 year-end chart performance for "5 Foot 9"
Chart (2022)	Position
Canada (Canadian Hot 100)	78
US Billboard Hot 100	67
US Country Airplay (Billboard)	18
US Hot Country Songs (Billboard)	11

== Certifications ==
Certifications for "5 Foot 9"
Region	Certification	Certified units/sales
Australia (ARIA)	Gold	35,000^{‡}
Canada (Music Canada)	3× Platinum	240,000^{‡}
New Zealand (RMNZ)	Gold	15,000^{‡}
United States (RIAA)	3× Platinum	3,000,000^{‡}
^{‡} Sales+streaming figures based on certification alone.
