= One Mississippi (Kane Brown song) =

2021 single by Kane Brown

Single by Kane Brown

from the album Different Man
- Released: August 20, 2021
- Genre: Country pop
- Length: 3:33
- Label: RCA Nashville
- Songwriters: Kane Brown; Ernest Keith Smith; Jesse Frasure; Levon Gray
- Producer: Dann Huff

Kane Brown singles chronology
"Memory" (2021)	"One Mississippi" (2021)	"Like I Love Country Music" (2022)

Music video
- "One Mississippi" on YouTube

"One Mississippi" is a song recorded by American country music singer Kane Brown. It was released on August 20, 2021, as the lead single from Brown's third studio album Different Man. The song was co-written by Brown, Ernest Keith Smith, Jesse Frasure and Levon Gray, and produced by Dann Huff.

== Background ==
In 2021, Brown signed a new writer, Levon Gray. It marks the first work between them.

He told to Country Now, said: "Gray tagged me in a post, and two other people, and I was the only artist who got back to him. I thought he could sing. And the song [in the post], he had written himself. I had just started my publishing company, so I was like, ‘I wanna give this guy a chance.’"

== Content ==
In an interview with The Nashville Soundbite , Brown pointed the song covered a relationship about "where you makeup and you break up, and you just keep running into each other, and then something about that spark in the relationship gets y’all back together and may fall apart again."

== Music video ==
The music video was released on August 20, 2021, and directed by Alex Alvga. It includes actor Ross Butler. The video features as "the story of a lovestruck pair, with Brown appearing against dramatic staging in a rural setting."

== Live performance ==
On August 24, 2021, Brown performed the song at Jimmy Kimmel Live!.

== Charts ==
=== Weekly charts ===
Weekly chart performance for "One Mississippi"
Chart (2021–2022)	Peak position
Australia Country Hot 50 (TMN)	7
Canada Hot 100 (Billboard)	45
Canada Country (Billboard)	1
US Billboard Hot 100	36
US Country Airplay (Billboard)	1
US Hot Country Songs (Billboard)	4

=== Year-end charts ===
Year-end chart performance for "One Mississippi"
Chart (2021)	Position
US Hot Country Songs (Billboard)	82

2022 year-end chart performance for "One Mississippi"
Chart (2022)	Position
US Billboard Hot 100	99
US Country Airplay (Billboard)	29
US Hot Country Songs (Billboard)	40

== Certifications ==
Certifications for "One Mississippi"
Region	Certification	Certified units/sales
Canada (Music Canada)	2× Platinum	160,000^{‡}
United States (RIAA)	Platinum	1,000,000^{‡}
^{‡} Sales+streaming figures based on certification alone.

== Release history ==
Release history for "One Mississippi"
Region	Date	Format	Label	Ref.
Various	August 20, 2021	Digital download; streaming	RCA Nashville	
United States	August 23, 2021	Country radio	RCA Nashville	
