= Like I Love Country Music =

Single by Kane Brown

from the album Different Man
- Released: May 6, 2022
- Genre: Country; country rock
- Length: 3:54 (album version); 2:48 (radio/lyric video version)
- Label: RCA Nashville
- Songwriters: Kane Brown; Jordan Schmidt; Taylor Phillips; Matt McGinn
- Producer: Dann Huff

Kane Brown singles chronology
"One Mississippi" (2021)	"Like I Love Country Music" (2022)	"Grand" (2022)

"Like I Love Country Music" is a song by American country music singer Kane Brown. It was released to country radio on May 6, 2022, and is the second single from Brown's third studio album Different Man.

== History ==
Brown announced the release of "Like I Love Country Music" on April 19, 2022, via an Instagram post he made with his daughter. He had originally wanted to release the ballad "Leave You Alone" as a single but decided that song was "too slow". Brown had originally written the song in 2019 and included a snippet of it on his Twitter account at the time.

Lyrically, "Like I Love Country Music" references country music songs, such as "Brand New Man" by Brooks & Dunn. Ronnie Dunn makes a vocal cameo on the song.

The song was officially released to radio on May 6, 2022. Brown co-wrote it with Jordan Schmidt, Taylor Phillips, and Matt McGinn during a songwriting retreat in 2019. Brown was originally going to release it on his 2020 extended play Mixtape, Vol. 1, but told the blog Country Now that he "lost interest" in the song. After listening to his recording again, he regained interest in the song and thus chose to release it as a single.

== Music video ==
The song's corresponding music video features Brown performing the song before patrons of a honky-tonk, while wearing a cowboy hat, leather pants, and vest.

== Charts ==
=== Weekly charts ===
Weekly chart performance for "Like I Love Country Music"
Chart (2022)	Peak position
Canada Hot 100 (Billboard)	33
Canada Country (Billboard)	1
US Billboard Hot 100	26
US Country Airplay (Billboard)	1
US Hot Country Songs (Billboard)	3

=== Year-end charts ===
2022 year-end chart performance for "Like I Love Country Music"
Chart (2022)	Position
Canada (Canadian Hot 100)	80
US Billboard Hot 100	85
US Country Airplay (Billboard)	40
US Hot Country Songs (Billboard)	24

== Certifications ==
Certifications and sales for "Like I Love Country Music"
Region	Certification	Certified units/sales
Canada (Music Canada)	2× Platinum	160,000^{‡}
United States (RIAA)	Platinum	1,000,000^{‡}
^{‡} Sales+streaming figures based on certification alone.
