= Jordan Schmidt =

American producer and songwriter

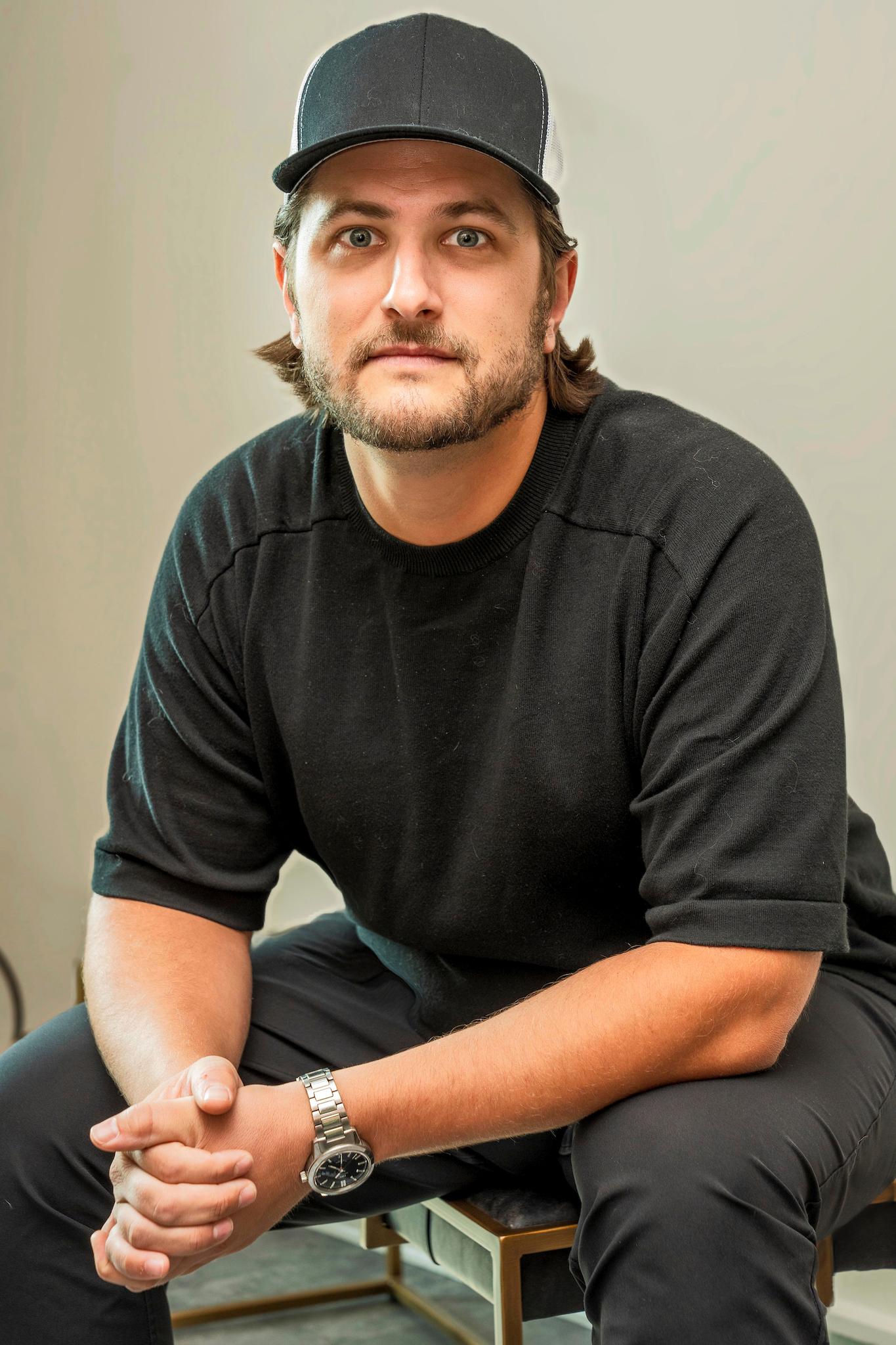
- Born: Jordan Mark Schmidt; February 26, 1988 (age 38); Duluth, Minnesota, U.S.
- Spouse: Renee Blair (m. 2022)
- Relatives: Dane Schmidt (brother)
- Awards: List of awards
- Musical career
- Genres: Pop; country; rock; alternative; country rock
- Occupations: Songwriter; record producer; mixing engineer; musician
- Instrument: Guitar
- Works: Jordan Schmidt discography
- Years active: 2005–present
- Website: Jordan Schmidt website

Jordan Mark Schmidt (born February 26, 1988) is an American mixing engineer, record producer, and songwriter. His portfolio covers musical styles including pop, country, rock, and alternative.

Schmidt was born in Duluth, Minnesota to local musicians. He started recording and mixing musicians from the area while in high school. He honed his engineering and mixing skills in Maryland with producer Matt Squire. In 2006, he moved to Minneapolis, Minnesota, where he mixed and produced local musicians, including his older brother, Dane Schmidt.

In 2012, Schmidt moved to Nashville, Tennessee and entered a publishing agreement with Tree Vibez Music in 2015, focusing on writing songs. Schmidt penned the 2016 country rock song "Lights Come On", recorded by Jason Aldean, which reached number one on the Billboard charts. The song was awarded Gold certification by the RIAA on January 31, 2017. As a writer or co-writer, he has had six more songs reach number-one since.

== Early life ==
Jordan Mark Schmidt was born in Duluth, Minnesota on February 26, 1988, the second of three children of local musicians Mark Schmidt and Tammy (née) Jannetta. Schmidt has an older brother, Dane, and a younger sister.

In 1983, Schmidt's parents co-founded a cover band, MYNX. His mother was the lead singer, while his father played electronic keyboards. MYNX attracted a fan following in Duluth and nearby areas. The Schmidt children grew up observing and occasionally participating in their parents' performances. In an interview, Schmidt recalled, "I grew up going, watching them. I loved all that. I thought I wanted to be a rock star."

A self-taught guitarist, Schmidt was playing in local bands by the time he turned 15. Since Duluth had no recording studios, he also began mixing his Blink-182 cover band and other local musicians. In 2003, he assisted his older brother and his acoustic alternative band "And Then I Turned Seven" in mixing their debut album, "Broken Summer". He again assisted his brother's band's second recording and their first EP, "The Jamestown Story," in 2005.

Schmidt stayed enrolled at Central High School in Duluth, Minnesota, until he completed his studies and graduated in June 2006. Initially, he tried to balance engineering and performing, but eventually, the technical aspect prevailed. Schmidt has credited his success to his Duluth roots, suggesting it may not have happened if he had come from a larger city.

== Music career ==
Following high school, Schmidt worked alongside producer Matt Squire before establishing his own studio in Minneapolis, Minnesota. After he got situated, he started working with local bands. He was including the recording engineer for Motion City Soundtrack's January 2010 release My Dinosaur Life, for his older brother's band Jamestown Story, for The Role Call, and for Paradise Fears' album Yours Truly released in 2011.

In 2012, Schmidt relocated to Nashville, Tennessee with his brother and manager, Dane. They established their first music venture and spent the next couple of years writing, producing and releasing music. A chance encounter with Florida Georgia Line's Brian Kelley in late 2014 led Schmidt to shift his focus to writing full-time and shortly after, he landed his first publishing deal as a songwriter. In April 2015, Schmidt signed a publishing deal with Tree Vibez Music. In July 2016, Schmidt collaborated on his first #1 song with Jason Aldean's "Lights Come On."

Schmidt wrote Kane Brown's 2017 song "What Ifs", which was awarded RIAA 9xPlantium certification on January 31, 2017. In 2018, he co-wrote Jason Aldean's "You Make It Easy", which was awarded RIAA 6xPlantium certification. In July 2019, Schmidt co-wrote Blake Shelton's "God's Country", which was awarded RIAA 4xPlantium certification. The song also won Single of the Year for the 53rd Annual Country Music Association Awards, as well as a Grammy nomination for the 62nd Annual Grammy Awards in the Best Country Solo Performance category.

During the pandemic Schmidt wrote & produced Nelly/Florida Georgia Line's 3× Platinum "Lil Bit" along with Blake Shelton's "Come Back as a Country Boy". In 2022, he achieved his fifth number one with Kane Brown's "Like I Love Country Music", which was awarded RIAA Gold certification on April 3, 2023.

In 2022, Schmidt collaborated on Brown's "Bury Me in Georgia." The song was awarded RIAA Platinum certification on February 29, 2024. In May 2023, Schmidt teamed-up for his seventh number one song with the release of Lainey Wilson's "Watermelon Moonshine."

== Personal life ==
In July 2017, Schmidt and Renee Blair met during one of her live shows in Nashville. Schmidt had attended the show with the intention of reaching out to her to discuss a songwriting collaboration. They started dating and got engaged on September 17, 2021.

Blair and Schmidt were married on September 24, 2022 at Oakley Hall at Riverview in Nashville. Among the guests were Mitchell Tenpenny, Katie Stevens, The Band Camino, Hardy, Polow da Don, and Dan Smyers of Dan + Shay. The couple welcomed their first child, a boy, on August 11, 2023.

== Discography ==
=== RIAA songs and albums ===
This table displays Singles and Albums certified by the RIAA. Each chart item has achieved significant sales milestones. The following RIAA certifications are included:

- Gold: 500,000 units
- Platinum: 1,000,000 units
- Multi-Platinum: 2,000,000 units and above (in million-unit increments)

RIAA certified sales for songs or productions associated with Jordan Schmidt
Certified Sales	Single	Artist	Certification date	Notes
9× Platinum	"What Ifs" feat. Lauren Alaina	Kane Brown	April 2, 2024	
6× Platinum	"You Make It Easy"	Jason Aldean	September 1, 2022	
4× Platinum	"God's Country"	Blake Shelton	May 7, 2021	
3× Platinum	"Lil Bit" feat. Florida Georgia Line	Nelly	September 23, 2022	
2× Platinum	"Wait In The Truck" feat. Lainey Wilson	Hardy	September 28, 2023	
2× Platinum	"Drunk Me"	Mitchell Tenpenny	October 10, 2019	
2× Platinum	"5 Foot 9"	Tyler Hubbard	March 8, 2024	
2× Platinum	"Country Ass Shit"	Morgan Wallen	November 19, 2021	
Platinum	Dancin' in the Country	Tyler Hubbard	March 8, 2024	
Platinum	"Bury Me in Georgia"	Kane Brown	February 29, 2024	
Platinum	"Like I Love Country Music"	Kane Brown	December 7, 2023	
Platinum	"Truth About You"	Mitchell Tenpenny	February 6, 2023	
Platinum	"Wishful Drinking" feat. Sam Hunt	Ingrid Andress	November 8, 2022	
Platinum	"Caught Up In The Country"	Rodney Atkins	October 28, 2021	
Platinum	"Rednecker"	Hardy	March 22, 2021	
Platinum	"Single Man"	High Valley	March 16, 2021 (Note: Certified Platinum Single from Music Canada)	
Platinum	"Like a Rodeo"	Kane Brown	March 17, 2020	
Platinum	"Memories"	One Ok Rock	March 2015 (Note: Certified Platinum Single from Recording Industry Association of Japan)	
Gold	"Bucket List'	Mitchell Tenpenny	February 2, 2024	
Gold	"We Got History"	Mitchell Tenpenny	September 21, 2023	
Gold	"Take Me Home for Christmas"	Dan + Shay	February 3, 2022	
Gold	"Blessings"	Florida Georgia Line	November 20, 2020	
Gold	"Anything She Says" feat. Seaforth	Mitchell Tenpenny	October 20, 2020	
Gold	"Alcohol You Later"	Mitchell Tenpenny	June 5, 2020	
Gold	"Like a Rodeo"	Kane Brown	March 17, 2020	
Gold	"Happens Like That"	Granger Smith	June 13, 2019	
Gold	"Smooth"	Florida Georgia Line	January 12, 2018	
Gold	"Lights Come On"	Jason Aldean	January 31, 2017	

RIAA certified albums associated with Jordan Schmidt
Certified Sales	Album	Artist	Certification date	Notes
2× Platinum	Dangerous: The Double Album	Morgan Wallen	Nov 19, 2021	
2× Platinum	Kane Brown	Kane Brown	Mar 17, 2020	
Platinum	Experiment	Kane Brown	Mar 17, 2020	
Platinum	Dig Your Roots	Florida Georgia Line	Aug 7, 2017	
Platinum	35xxxv	One Ok Rock	Mar 2015 (RIAJ)	
Gold	Tyler Hubbard	Tyler Hubbard	Apr 12, 2024	
Gold	Stereotype	Cole Swindell	Oct 3, 2023	
Gold	Different Man	Kane Brown	Apr 3, 2023	
Gold	Telling All My Secrets	Mitchell Tenpenny	Aug 5, 2022	
