= Jelly Roll discography =

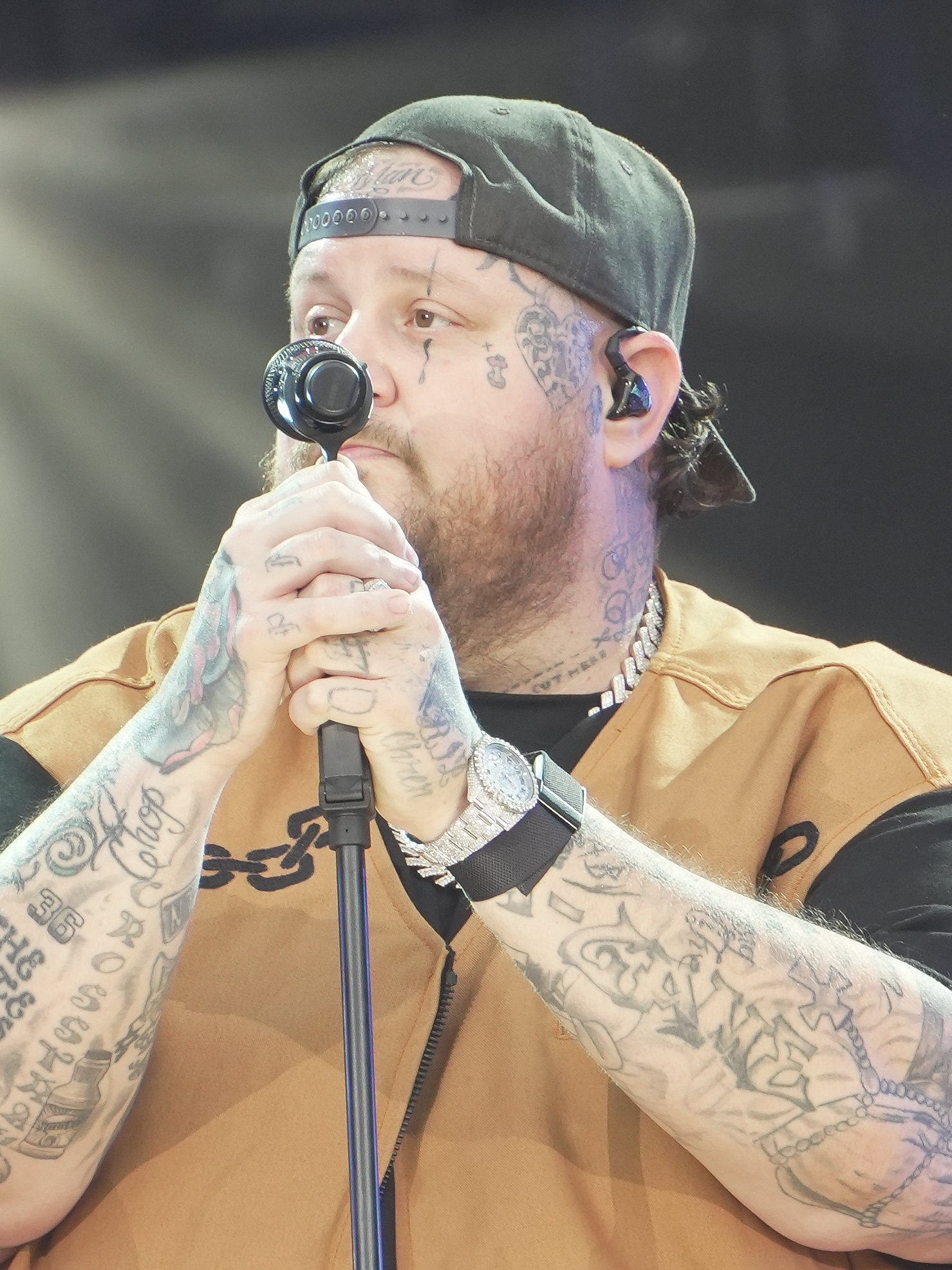
- Jelly Roll performing at the Global Citizen Festival in 2024
- Studio albums: 10
- EPs: 2
- Singles: 25
- Collaborative albums: 9
- Mixtapes: 22

American musician Jelly Roll has released 10 studio albums, 9 collaborative albums, 22 mixtapes, 2 extended plays and 25 singles. He began as a hip-hop artist, with the release of his first collaborative album Year Round, with Lil Wyte and BPZ, in 2011. Jelly Roll began a shift to country music in 2021 with the album Ballads of the Broken on BBR Music Group, followed by Whitsitt Chapel in 2023. His country music albums have accounted for the singles "Son of a Sinner", "Need a Favor", "Save Me", "Halfway to Hell", "I Am Not Okay", "Liar", and "Heart of Stone", all of which went to number one on Country Airplay.

== Albums ==
=== Studio albums ===
List of studio albums, with selected chart positions and certifications
Title	Album details	Peak chart positions									Certifications
Title	Album details	US	US Country	US Rock	US R&B	US Indie	AUS	CAN	NZ	UK	Certifications
The Big Sal Story	Released: October 26, 2012; Label: A-Game; Format: CD, digital download, streaming	—	—	—	—	—	—	—	—	—	
Sobriety Sucks	Released: May 13, 2016; Label: Bad Apple Inc.; Format: CD, digital download, streaming	— (Note: Sobriety Sucks did not enter the Billboard 200, but peaked at No. 12 on the Billboard Top Heatseekers)	—	—	42	48	—	—	—	—	
Addiction Kills	Released: April 21, 2017; Label: Bad Apple Inc.; Format: CD, digital download, streaming	— (Note: Addiction Kills did not enter the Billboard 200, but peaked at No. 22 on the Billboard Top Heatseekers)	—	—	—	—	—	—	—	—	
Goodnight Nashville	Released: December 7, 2018; Label: War Dog; Format: CD, digital download, streaming	— (Note: Goodnight Nashville did not enter the Billboard 200, but peaked at No. 12 on the Billboard Top Heatseekers)	—	—	—	46	—	—	—	—	
Whiskey Sessions II	Released: April 5, 2019; Label: Jingle Punks; Format: CD, digital download, streaming	—	—	—	—	—	—	—	—	—	
A Beautiful Disaster	Released: March 13, 2020; Label: War Dog; Format: CD, digital download, streaming	97	—	—	—	9	—	—	—	—	RIAA: Gold
Self Medicated	Released: October 16, 2020; Label: War Dog; Format: CD, digital download, streaming	110	—	—	—	22	—	—	—	—	
Ballads of the Broken	Released: September 17, 2021; Label: BBR Music Group; Format: CD, LP, digital download, streaming	157	—	41	—	21	—	—	—	—	RIAA: Gold
Whitsitt Chapel	Released: June 2, 2023; Label: BBR Music Group; Format: CD, LP, digital download, streaming	3	2	1	—	1	—	22	—	—	RIAA: Platinum
Beautifully Broken	Released: October 11, 2024; Label: Republic; Format: CD, LP, digital download, streaming	1	1	—	—	—	19	3	22	41	RIAA: Platinum; BPI: Silver; MC: Platinum; RMNZ: Gold
"—" denotes items which were not released in that country or failed to chart.

=== Collaborative albums ===
List of collaborative albums, with selected chart positions
Title	Album details	Peak chart positions			
Title	Album details	US R&B	US Rap	US Indie	US Heat.
Year Round (with Lil Wyte and BPZ)	Released: April 19, 2011; Label: Hypnotize Minds; Format: CD, digital download, streaming	—	—	—	—
Strictly Business (with Haystak)	Released: November 15, 2011; Label: Haystak, Inc.; Format: CD, digital download, streaming	67	—	—	16
No Filter (with Lil Wyte)	Released: July 16, 2013; Label: Phixieous Entertainment; Format: CD, digital download, streaming	33	17	42	—
Business As Usual (with Haystak)	Released: November 19, 2013; Label: Haystak, Inc.; Format: CD, digital download, streaming	42	—	—	11
No Filter 2 (with Lil Wyte)	Released: November 18, 2016; Label: Bad Apple Inc.; Format: CD, digital download, streaming	47	—	—	—
Waylon & Willie (with Struggle Jennings)	Released: November 3, 2017; Label: Struggle/Self-released; Format: CD, digital download, streaming	—	—	28	4
Waylon & Willie II (with Struggle Jennings)	Released: March 23, 2018; Label: Struggle/Self-released; Format: CD, digital download, streaming	—	—	17	6
Waylon & Willie III (with Struggle Jennings)	Released: November 16, 2018; Label: Struggle/Self-released; Format: CD, digital download, streaming	—	—	25	4
Waylon & Willie IV (with Struggle Jennings)	Released: December 16, 2020; Label: Struggle/Self-released; Format: CD, digital download, streaming	—	—	—	—
"—" denotes items which were not released in that country or failed to chart.

== Mixtapes ==
List of mixtapes, with selected details
Title	Mixtape details
The Plain Shmear Tape	Released: 2003; Label: Self-released (personal mixtape demo); Format: Digital download, streaming
Gamblin' on the White Boy Vol 1	Released: 2004; Label: Crosstrax Entertainment; Format: CD, digital download, streaming
The Halfway House	Released: 2005; Label: Dope City Records; Format: CD, digital download, streaming
Street Flavor (with Charlie P and Haystak)	Released: 2006; Label: Street Flavor Records; Format: CD, digital download, streaming
The Hate Goes On	Released: 2006; Label: Forty West Records; Format: CD, digital download, streaming
House Arrest	Released: 2007; Label: Self-released; Format: CD, digital download, streaming
Gamblin' on the White Boy Vol 2	Released: 2008; Label: Self-released; Format: CD, digital download, streaming
Gamblin' on a Whiteboy Vol 3	Released: December 22, 2009; Label: Self-released; Format: CD, digital download, streaming
Therapeutic Music: The Bipolar Edition	Released: 2010; Label: Bad Apple Inc.; Format: CD, digital download, streaming
Therapeutic Music 2: The Inner Struggle	Released: 2010; Label: Bad Apple Inc.; Format: CD, digital download, streaming
Deal or No Deal	Released: 2010; Label: Self-released; Format: Digital download, streaming
Mr. Controversy	Released: June 7, 2010; Label: Self-released; Format: Digital download, streaming
Eleven on the Come Out	Released: January 1, 2011; Label: Self-released; Format: Digital download, streaming
Gamblin' on a White Boy Vol 4	Released: June 7, 2011; Label: Top $helf Investments; Format: CD, digital download, streaming
The Collection	Released: 2011; Label: Self-released; Format: CD, digital download, streaming
Therapeutic Music 3: Road To Vol. 4	Released: 2011; Label: Bad Apple Inc.; Format: CD, digital download, streaming
Therapeutic Music 4: Just My Thoughts	Released: 2012; Label: Bad Apple Inc.; Format: CD, digital download, streaming
White Trash Tale	Released: 2012; Label: A-Game; Format: Digital download, streaming
Mid-Grade Miracle: The Boston George Story	Released: April 17, 2012; Label: A-Game; Format: CD, digital download, streaming
Whiskey, Weed & Women	Released: August 6, 2013; Label: A-Game/Crash Out Music; Format: CD, digital download, streaming
Biggest Loser	Released: March 11, 2014; Label: Crash Out Music; Format: Digital download, streaming
Therapeutic Music 5	Released: December 4, 2015; Label: Bad Apple Inc.; Format: CD, digital download, streaming

== Extended plays ==
List of EPs, with selected details
Title	EP details
Whiskey Sessions	Released: December 9, 2014; Label: Jingle Punks; Format: CD, digital download, streaming
Crosses & Crossroads	Released: April 15, 2019; Label: War Dog; Format: CD, digital download, streaming

== Singles ==
=== As lead artist ===
List of singles as lead artist, showing year released, with selected chart positions, certifications and album name
Title	Year	Peak chart positions									Certifications	Album
Title	Year	US	US Country	US Country Airplay	US Main.	US Rock	CAN	CAN Country	CAN Rock	WW	Certifications	Album
"Smoking Section"	2015	—	—	—	—	—	—	—	—	—	RIAA: Gold	Therapeutic Music 5
"Hate Goes On"	2017	—	—	—	—	—	—	—	—	—	RIAA: Gold	Addiction Kills
"Only"	2017	—	—	—	—	—	—	—	—	—	RIAA: Gold	Addiction Kills
"Wheels Fall Off"	2017	—	—	—	—	—	—	—	—	—	RIAA: Gold	Addiction Kills
"I'm on It" (featuring Young Slugga, David Ray, and Brabo Gator)	2018	—	—	—	—	—	—	—	—	—		Non-album single
"Save Me"	2020	— (Note: "Save Me" did not enter the Billboard Hot 100, but peaked at number 29 on the Digital Songs Sales chart.)	—	—	—	—	—	—	—	—	RIAA: 3× Platinum; ARIA: Gold; BPI: Silver; RMNZ: Platinum	Self Medicated
"Call It Quits" (with Crypt and Adam Calhoun)	2021	—	—	—	—	—	—	—	—	—		Buried Alive
"Dead Man Walking"	2021	—	—	—	1	30	—	—	38	—		Ballads of the Broken
"Son of a Sinner"	2022	31	8	1	—	4	61	7	—	—	RIAA: 2× Platinum	Ballads of the Broken
"Need a Favor"	2022	13	3	1	1	1	36	1	31	139	RIAA: 2× Platinum; ARIA: Gold; MC: Gold; RMNZ: Gold	Whitsitt Chapel
"Save Me" (with Lainey Wilson)	2023	19	6	1	—	—	38	1	—	—	ARIA: Gold; RMNZ: Gold	Whitsitt Chapel
"Wild Ones" (with Jessie Murph)	2023	35	7	—	—	—	42	—	—	112	RIAA: 2× Platinum; ARIA: 2× Platinum; MC: 2× Platinum; RMNZ: Platinum	That Ain't No Man That's the Devil
"Halfway to Hell"	2024	48	11	1	—	7	84	1	—	—		Whitsitt Chapel
"Best for Me" (with Joyner Lucas)	2024	93	—	—	—	—	—	—	—	—	RIAA: Gold	Not Now I'm Busy
"I Am Not Okay"	2024	14	3	1	—	—	29	1	—	98	RIAA: 2× Platinum; BPI: Silver; MC: 2× Platinum; RMNZ: Gold	Beautifully Broken
"Liar"	2024	31	5	1	1	5	31	1	12	—	RIAA: Platinum; BPI: Silver; MC: Platinum; RMNZ: Platinum	Beautifully Broken
"Heart of Stone"	2025	53	14	1	—	6	65	2	—	—		Beautifully Broken
"Hard Fought Hallelujah" (with Brandon Lake or with Lake and Jon Batiste)	2025	40	12	24	—	8	—	60	—	197	RIAA: Platinum (original); RIAA: Platinum (remix)	King of Hearts
"Bloodline" (with Alex Warren)	2025	32	—	—	—	—	17	—	—	19	RIAA: Gold; ARIA: Gold; BPI: Gold; MC: Gold; RMNZ: Gold	You'll Be Alright, Kid
"Holy Water" (with Marshmello)	2025	79	22	—	—	—	77	—	—	—		Non-album single
"Amen" (with Shaboozey)	2025	27	6	1	—	—	30	2	—	—	RIAA: Platinum; RMNZ: Gold	Where I've Been, Isn't Where I'm Going: The Complete Edition
"Thorns"	2026	—	—	58	—	—	—	—	—	—		TBA
"Lighter" (with Carín León)	2026	—	—	—	—	—	—	—	—	—		Official FIFA World Cup 2026 Album
"Hands Up"	2026	74	23	8	—	—	72	5	—	—		TBA
"—" denotes items which were not released in that country or failed to chart.

=== As featured artist ===
List of singles as featured artist, with showing year released, with selected chart positions and album name
Title	Year	Peak chart positions										Certifications	Album
Title	Year	US	US Country	US Country Airplay	US Hard Rock	US Main.	US Rock	CAN	CAN Country	NZ Hot	UK Rock	Certifications	Album
"House of Mirrors" (Hollywood Undead featuring Jelly Roll)	2023	—	—	—	17	—	—	—	—	—	—		Hotel Kalifornia
"Chevrolet" (Dustin Lynch featuring Jelly Roll)	2023	50	15	1	—	—	—	60	1	—	—	RIAA: Platinum	Killed the Cowboy
"Almost Home" (Craig Morgan featuring Jelly Roll)	2023	—	—	—	—	—	—	—	—	—	—		Enlisted
"All My Life" (Falling in Reverse featuring Jelly Roll)	2024	77	—	—	1	1	14	—	—	24	21		Popular Monster
"Somebody Save Me" (Eminem featuring Jelly Roll)	2024	27	—	—	—	—	—	22	—	—	—	BPI: Silver; MC: Gold; RMNZ: Gold	The Death of Slim Shady (Coup de Grâce)
"Lonely Road" (Machine Gun Kelly featuring Jelly Roll)	2024	33	13	—	—	—	7	25	—	4	—	BPI: Silver	Beautifully Broken (Pickin' Up the Pieces)
"Hurt" (with OneRepublic)	2024	—	—	—	—	—	—	—	—	33	—		Artificial Paradise (Super Deluxe)
"Believe" (Brooks & Dunn with Jelly Roll)	2024	— (Note: "Believe" did not enter the Billboard Hot 100, but charted at number 6 on the Billboard Hot Christian Songs chart.)	—	—	—	—	—	—	58	—	—		Reboot II
"—" denotes items which were not released in that country or failed to chart.

=== Promotional singles ===
List of promotional singles, showing year released, with selected chart positions, certifications and album name
Title	Year	Peak chart positions							Certifications	Album
Title	Year	US Bub.	US Country	US Dig.	US Rock	BEL (FL)	CAN	NLD Air.	Certifications	Album
"Son of the Dirty South" (Brantley Gilbert featuring Jelly Roll)	2022	—	48	15	—	—	—	—	RIAA: Gold	So Help Me God
"She"	2022	—	—	29	22	—	—	—		Whitsitt Chapel
"Unlive" (with Yelawolf)	2023	—	—	—	27	—	—	—		Whitsitt Chapel
"Should've Been a Cowboy" (featuring T-Pain)	2024	—	48	—	—	—	—	—		Non-album single
"Dead End Road"	2024	1	30	—	20	—	—	—		Twisters: The Album
"Get By"	2024	—	45	—	26	—	—	—		Beautifully Broken
"Run It"	2024	—	—	—	—	—	—	—		Sonic the Hedgehog 3: Music from the Motion Picture
"Only God Knows" (with Struggle Jennings)	2025	—	—	—	—	—	—	—		TBA
"Dreams Don't Die"	2025	24	35	—	—	—	98	—		TBA
"I'm Good"	2026	—	—	—	—	5	—	15		Goat
"Rise Up" (Official song of the 2026 Stanley Cup playoffs)	2026	—	—	—	—	—	—	—		Non-album single
"—" denotes items which were not released in that country or failed to chart.

== Other charted and certified songs ==
List of other charted and certified songs, showing year released, with selected chart positions, certifications and album name
Title	Year	Peak chart positions						Certification	Album
Title	Year	US	US Country	US Rock	CAN	NZ Hot	WW	Certification	Album
"Fall in the Fall" (with Struggle Jennings)	2017	—	—	—	—	—	—	RIAA: Gold	Waylon & Willie II
"Same Asshole"	2019	—	—	—	—	—	—	RIAA: Platinum	Crosses & Crossroads
"I Need You"	2020	—	—	—	—	—	—	RIAA: Gold	A Beautiful Disaster
"Creature" (featuring Tech N9ne and Krizz Kaliko)	2020	—	—	—	—	—	—	RIAA: Platinum	A Beautiful Disaster
"Bottle & Mary Jane"	2020	—	—	—	—	—	—	RIAA: Platinum	A Beautiful Disaster
"The Lost"	2023	—	—	32	—	—	—		Whitsitt Chapel
"Behind Bars" (with Brantley Gilbert and Struggle Jennings)	2023	—	—	36	—	—	—		Whitsitt Chapel
"Hold on Me"	2023	—	—	43	—	—	—		Whitsitt Chapel
"Kill a Man"	2023	—	—	44	—	—	—		Whitsitt Chapel
"Whiskey Bent" (Cody Johnson featuring Jelly Roll)	2023	—	47	—	—	—	—		Leather
"Losers" (Post Malone featuring Jelly Roll)	2024	25	12	—	27	5	52		F-1 Trillion
"Winning Streak"	2024	— (Note: "Winning Streak" did not enter the Billboard Hot 100, but peaked at number six on the Bubbling Under Hot 100 chart.)	24	—	86	19	—		Beautifully Broken
"Burning"	2024	—	—	31	—	—	—		Beautifully Broken
"Unpretty"	2024	—	—	40	—	—	—		Beautifully Broken
"Time of Day" (with Machine Gun Kelly)	2024	—	—	—	—	35	—		Beautifully Broken
"Take a Bow" (with Halsey)	2024	—	—	45	—	—	—		Beautifully Broken
"Past Yesterday" (with Skylar Grey)	2024	—	—	35	—	—	—		Beautifully Broken
"Last Dance with Mary Jane" (with Snoop Dogg, Dr. Dre and Tom Petty)	2024	—	—	—	—	9	—		Missionary
"Haunted" (with Kane Brown)	2025	58	14	—	79	—	—		The High Road
"Sharks" (with Lil Wayne and Big Sean)	2025	54	—	—	—	38	—		Tha Carter VI
"Box Me Up" (BigXthaPlug featuring Jelly Roll)	2025	61	18	—	88	—	—		I Hope You're Happy
"—" denotes items which were not released in that country or failed to chart.

== Music videos ==
Year	Title	Director	Album
2012	"Dream While I'm Awake"	Unknown	The Big Sal Story
2013	"Guess Who's Back"	Unknown	The Big Sal Story
2016	"When I Get Rich"	Jon Conner	Whiskey Sessions II
2017	"Addiction Kills"	Khil Datta	Addiction Kills
2017	"Roll Me Up"	Khil Datta	Addiction Kills
2017	"Hate Goes On"	Khil Datta	Addiction Kills
2018	"Heaven"	Just Produce Hy Def	Addiction Kills
2019	"Bring It Back"	John Harness	Goodnight Nashville
2020	"Creature"	Chris Tempel	A Beautiful Disaster
2020	"I Need You"	Chris Tempel	A Beautiful Disaster
2020	"Tears Could Talk"	Just Produce Hy Def	A Beautiful Disaster
2020	"Nothing Left At All"	Cameron Logan Cox	A Beautiful Disaster
2020	"A Beautiful Disaster"	Cameron Logan Cox	A Beautiful Disaster
2020	"Life"	Just Produce Hy Def	A Beautiful Disaster
2020	"Bottle and Mary Jane"	Just Produce Hy Def	A Beautiful Disaster
2020	"The Bottom"	Just Produce Hy Def	A Beautiful Disaster
2020	"Echoes"	Israel Garcia	Goodnight Nashville
2020	"Promise"	Unknown	Self Medicated
2020	"House of Cards"	Unknown	Self Medicated
2020	"Loneliness"	Unknown	Self Medicated
2020	"Johnny and June"	Unknown	Self Medicated
2020	"Better Off Alone"	Unknown	Self Medicated
2020	"Overdose"	Unknown	Self Medicated
2020	"Dance with Ghosts"	Ryan Hood	Self Medicated
2020	"My Last Joint"	Unknown	Self Medicated
2021	"Sober"	Unknown	Ballad of the Broken
2021	"Dead Man Walking"	Unknown	Ballad of the Broken
2022	"Even Angels Cry"	Unknown	Ballad of the Broken
2022	"She"	Patrick Tohill	Whitsitt Chapel
2023	"Need a Favor"	Patrick Tohill	Whitsitt Chapel
2024	"Dead End Road"	Alex Bittan	Twisters: The Album
2024	"Liar"	Unknown	Beautifully Broken
2024	"Run It"	Unknown	Sonic the Hedgehog 3: The Album
