= 2023 CMT Music Awards =

Country music award ceremony

- Date: April 2, 2023
- Location: Moody Center, Austin, Texas
- Hosted by: Kelsea Ballerini; Kane Brown

Highlights
- Most wins: Jelly Roll (3)
- Most nominations: Lainey Wilson (4)

Television/radio coverage
- Network: CBS, Paramount+, CMT (Extended Edition)
- Viewership: 5.7 million

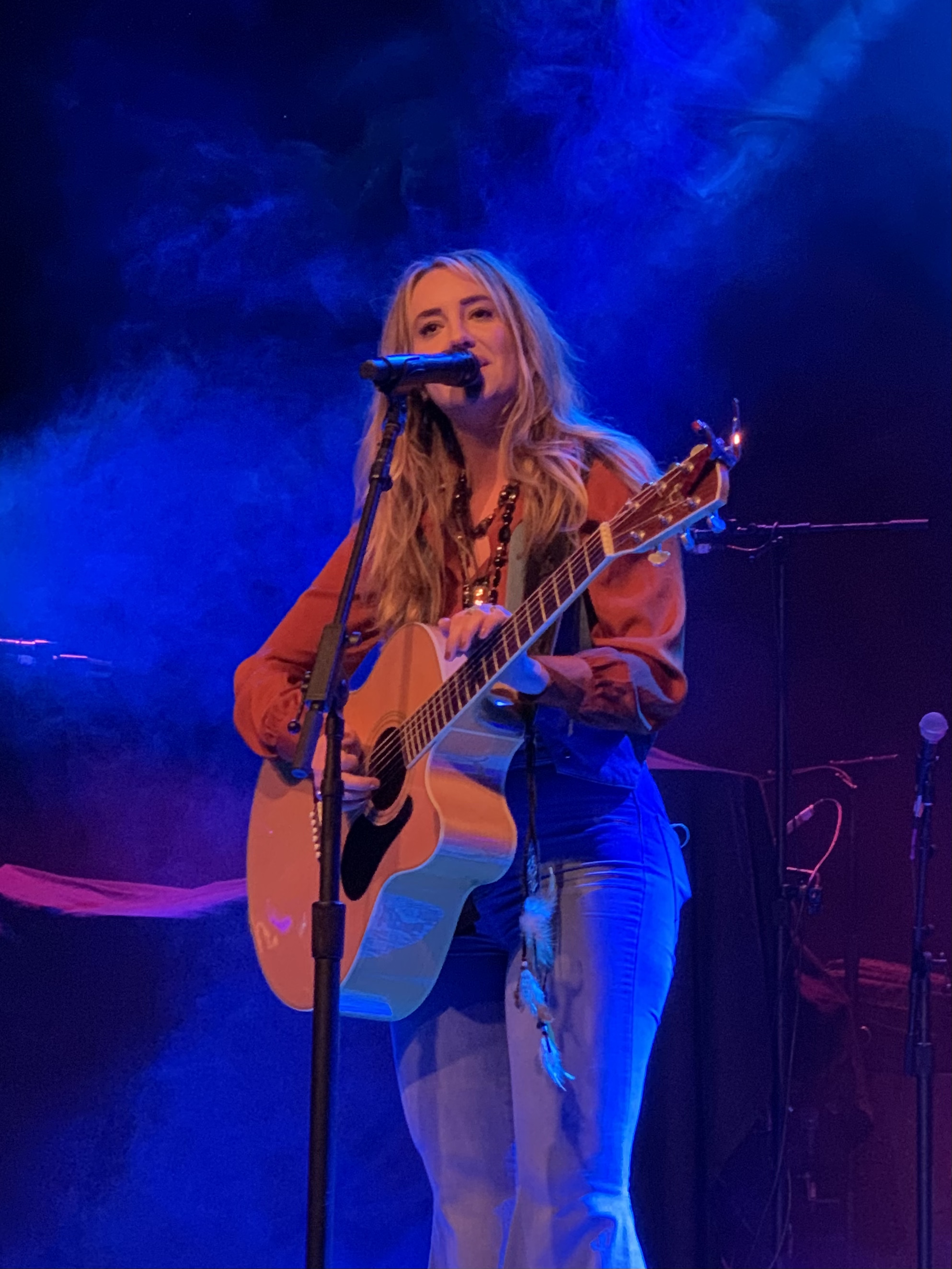
Lainey Wilson took home her very first CMT award for Female Video of the Year and had the most nominations with 4 total.

The 2023 CMT Music Awards, the 22nd edition of the awards ceremony, were held at the Moody Center in Austin, Texas, on April 2, 2023. The ceremony was hosted by Kelsea Ballerini and Kane Brown, aired on CBS and streamed on Paramount+; an additional extended edition aired on CMT.

== Background ==
The CMT Music Awards is country music's only entirely fan-voted awards show. This will be the second edition following the ceremony's move to CBS, the third hosted by Kelsea Ballerini and fourth by Kane Brown. Ballerini dedicated the ceremony to the victims of the 2023 Covenant School shooting.

=== CMT Equal Play Award ===
On March 27, CMT announced that country legend Shania Twain would be honored with the CMT Equal Play Award. The award “recognizes an artist who is a visible and vocal advocate for elevating diverse and underrepresented voices in country music.” Previous recipients include Jennifer Nettles and Linda Martell.

== Nominees and winners ==
Nominees were announced on March 8, 2023.

Video of the Year	Female Video of the Year
Kane Brown and Katelyn Brown — "Thank God"; Carrie Underwood — "Hate My Heart; HARDY feat. Lainey Wilson — "wait in the truck"	Lainey Wilson — "Heart Like a Truck"; Carly Pearce — "What He Didn't Do"; Carrie Underwood — "Ghost Story"; Gabby Barrett — "Pick Me Up"; Kelsea Ballerini — "HEARTFIRST"; Maren Morris — "Humble Quest"; Miranda Lambert — "Actin' Up"
Male Video of the Year	Duo/Group Video of the Year
Jelly Roll — "Son of a Sinner"; Bailey Zimmerman — "Rock and a Hard Place"; Cody Johnson — "Human"; Cole Swindell — "She Had Me at Heads Carolina"; Kane Brown — "Like I Love Country Music"; Luke Combs — "The Kind of Love We Make"; Morgan Wallen — "Wasted on You"	Zac Brown Band — "Out in the Middle"; Dan + Shay — "You (Performance Video)"; Lady A — "Summer State of Mind"; Little Big Town — "Hell Yeah"; Parmalee — "Take My Name"; The War and Treaty — "That's How Love Is Made"
Female Breakthrough Video of the Year	Male Breakthrough Video of the Year
Megan Moroney — "Tennessee Orange"; Avery Anna — "Narcissist"; Kylie Morgan — "If He Wanted to He Would"; MacKenzie Porter — "Pickup"; Morgan Wade — "Wilder Days"; Tiera Kennedy — "Found It in You"	Jelly Roll — "Son of a Sinner"; Bailey Zimmerman — "Fall in Love"; Corey Kent — "Wild as Her"; Drake Milligan — "Sounds Like Something I'd Do"; Jackson Dean — "Don't Come Lookin'"; Nate Smith — "Whiskey on You"
Collaborative Video of the Year	CMT Digital-First Performance of the Year
HARDY feat. Lainey Wilson — "wait in the truck"; Elle King feat. Dierks Bentley — "Worth a Shot"; Ingrid Andress with Sam Hunt — "Wishful Drinking"; Kane Brown and Katelyn Brown — "Thank God"; Midland feat. Jon Pardi — "Longneck Way to Go"; Russell Dickerson feat. Jake Scott — "She Likes It"; Thomas Rhett and Katy Perry — "Where We Started"	From CMT All Access: Jelly Roll — "Son of a Sinner"; From CMT Campfire Session: Charley Crockett — "Time of the Cottonwood Trees"; From CMT Stages: Chris Young — "Gettin' You Home"; From CMT Studio Sessions: Ingrid Andress — "Wishful Drinking"; From CMT Viral to Verified: Megan Moroney — "Tennessee Orange"; From CMT Campfire Session: Scotty McCreery — "Damn Strait"
CMT Performance of the Year
From 2022 CMT Music Awards: Cody Johnson — "‘Til You Can't"; From 2022 CMT Music Awards: Black Pumas and Mickey Guyton — "Colors"; From CMT Giants: Vince Gill: Chris Stapleton — "Whenever You Come Around"; From 2022 CMT Music Awards: Cole Swindell and Lainey Wilson — "Never Say Never"; From CMT Storytellers: Darius Rucker — "Let Her Cry"; From Coal Miner's Daughter: A Celebration of the Life and Music of Loretta Lynn: Emmy Russell and Lukas Nelson — "Lay Me Down"; From CMT Crossroads: LeAnn Rimes, Ashley McBryde and Carly Pearce — "One Way Ticket" (from "CMT Crossroads: LeAnn Rimes & Friends"); From 2022 CMT Music Awards: Keith Urban — "Wild Hearts"; From 2022 CMT Music Awards: The Judds — "Love Can Build a Bridge"; From Naomi Judd: A River of Time Celebration: Wynonna Judd and Brandi Carlile — "The Rose"
CMT Equal Play Award
Shania Twain

== Performers ==
Performers were announced on March 23, 2023.

Performer(s)	Song(s)
Blake Shelton	"No Body"
Tyler Hubbard	"Dancin' in the Country"
Carly Pearce	"What He Didn't Do"
Wynonna Judd; Ashley McBryde	"I Want to Know What Love Is"
Alanis Morissette; Ingrid Andress; Lainey Wilson; Madeline Edwards; Morgan Wade	"You Oughta Know"
Carrie Underwood	"Hate My Heart"
Cody Johnson	"Human"
Darius Rucker; The Black Crowes	"She Talks to Angels"
Gary Clark Jr.	Tribute to Stevie Ray Vaughan "The House Is Rockin'"
Gwen Stefani; Carly Pearce	"Just a Girl"
Jelly Roll	"Need a Favor"
Keith Urban	"Brown Eyes Baby"
Kelsea Ballerini; Manila Luzon; Kennedy Davenport; Jan Sport; Olivia Lux	"If You Go Down (I'm Goin' Down Too)"
Lainey Wilson	"Heart Like a Truck"
Kane Brown; Katelyn Brown	"Thank God"
Paul Rodgers; Cody Johnson; Billy Gibbons; Slash; Warren Haynes; Chuck Leavell; Ethan Pilzer; Rich Redmond; LeAnn Rimes; Wynonna Judd	Tribute to Lynyrd Skynyrd "Simple Man" "Sweet Home Alabama"
Shania Twain	"Giddy Up!"

Ram Trucks Side Stage

Performer(s)	Song(s)
Lily Rose	"Watcha Know About That"
Avery Anna	"Narcissist"
Chapel Hart	"You Can Have Him Jolene"
Jackson Dean	"Don't Come Lookin'"
Megan Moroney	"Tennessee Orange"
Nate Smith	"Whiskey on You"

== Presenters ==
- Carly Pearce introduced CMT Next Generation of woman 10th anniversary with performance by Alanis Morissette and ladies
- Carrie Underwood introduced Darius Rucker and Black Crowes performance
- Charles Esten presented Performance of the year
- Darius Rucker presented Video of the Year
- Dixie D'Amelio introduced Carrie Underwood performance
- Dustin Lynch introduced Dixie D' Amelio
- HARDY introduced Lainey Wilson performance
- Ian Bohen and Jen Landon introduced Lainey Wilson performance
- Jon Pardi introduced Carly Pearce performance
- LeAnn Rimes presented Male Video of the Year
- Madison Bailey presented Performance of the year
- Max Thieriot introduced Kane and Katelyn Brown performance
- Megan Thee Stallion presented Shania Twain with the Equal Play Award
- Noah Schnapp presented the Collabrative video of the year
- Parker McCollum presented Breakthrough Female & Male Video of the Year
- Peter Frampton introduced Lynyrd Skynyrd tribute
- Shania Twain presented Female Video of the Year
- Steve Howey introduced Cody Johnson performance
- Travis Kelce introduced Kelsea Ballerini performance
