= The High Road (Kane Brown album) =

- Vinyl album cover

Studio album by Kane Brown
- Released: January 24, 2025
- Genre: Country
- Length: 58:39
- Label: RCA Nashville
- Producer: Austin Brown; Jonathan Capeci; Digital Farm Animals; Earwulf; Jaxson Free; Andrew Goldstein; Dann Huff; Connor McDonough; Marshmello; Nicholas Sainato

Kane Brown chronology
Different Man (2022)	The High Road (2025)

Singles from The High Road
- 1. "I Can Feel It" Released: September 21, 2023; 2. "Miles on It" Released: May 3, 2024; 3. "Backseat Driver" Released: October 11, 2024; 4. "Body Talk" Released: November 22, 2024

The High Road is the fourth studio album by American singer Kane Brown. It was released January 24, 2025, via RCA Records Nashville. The album contains the singles "I Can Feel It", "Miles on It", and "Backseat Driver". It features collaborations with Marshmello, Khalid, Jelly Roll, Brown's wife Katelyn Brown, and Brad Paisley.

== History ==
Kane Brown revealed the track list in December 2024. Before the album's release, it accounted for the singles "I Can Feel It", "Miles on It", and "Backseat Driver". The album includes two duets with Brown's wife, Katelyn, as well as Jelly Roll, Brad Paisley, and Khalid. "I Can Feel It" contains an interpolation of "In the Air Tonight" by Phil Collins, while "Stay" interpolates Sugarland's "Stay".

== Track listing ==
The High Road track listing
No.	Title	Writer(s)	Producer(s)	Length
1.	"I Am"	Kane Brown; Gabe Foust; Jaxson Free; Josh Hoge; Zach Seabaugh	Dann Huff; Free^{[v]}; Jorgen Odegard^{[v]}	4:10
2.	"Fiddle in the Band"	K. Brown; Foust; Jordan Walker; Russell Sutton	Huff; Justin Niebank^{[v]}	2:53
3.	"Backseat Driver"	Jacob Davis; Walker	Huff^{[p]}; Jonathan Capeci^{[v]}	3:49
4.	"Miles on It" (with Marshmello)	Marshmello; K. Brown; Jake Torrey; Riley McDonough; Connor McDonough; Castle; Nick Gale; Earwulf	C. McDonough; Digital Farm Animals; Earwulf; Marshmello; Capeci^{[v]}	2:50
5.	"Says I Can"	K. Brown; Foust; Free; Matt Roy	Huff; Capeci^{[v]}	3:02
6.	"3"	K. Brown; Foust; Tim Nichols; Rivers Rutherford	Huff^{[p]}; Capeci^{[v]}	3:01
7.	"Rescue" (with Khalid)	K. Brown; Foust; Free; Khalid Robinson	Andrew Goldstein; Foust^{[v]}; Denis Kosiak^{[v]}	3:03
8.	"Haunted" (with Jelly Roll)	K. Brown; Foust; Free	Huff^{[p]}	4:25
9.	"Start a Fire"	K. Brown; Foust; Free; Taylor Phillips	Huff^{[p]}	2:55
10.	"Body Talk" (with Katelyn Brown)	K. Brown; Capeci; Amanda Ibanez; Nick Long; Nicholas Sainato	Capeci^{[p]}; Sainato	2:28
11.	"Gorgeous"	Gregory Hein; Blake Carter; Foust; Free	Huff; Capeci^{[v]}	3:06
12.	"Beside Me"	K. Brown; Foust; Free; Phillips; John Byron; Alexander Izquierdo; Ryan Vojtesak	Huff^{[p]}	3:08
13.	"I Can Feel It"	K. Brown; Foust; Free; Phil Collins	Huff^{[p][}; Foust^{[v]}	2:45
14.	"Things We Quit" (with Brad Paisley)	Jesse Frasure; Michael Hardy; Josh Osborne; Morgan Wallen	Huff^{[p]}	3:09
15.	"Back Around"	K. Brown; Foust; Jordan Minton; Hunter Phelps	Huff; Capeci^{[v]}	3:24
16.	"Stay"	K. Brown; Foust; Free; Jennifer Nettles	Huff	3:26
17.	"Do Us Apart" (with Katelyn Brown)	K. Brown; Foust; Free; Phillips	Huff; Austin Brown; Capeci^{[v]}	3:37
18.	"When You Forget"	K. Brown; Foust; Free; Walker; Phelps	Huff; Capeci^{[v]}	3:28
Total length:				58:39

Notes

- ^{^[p]} signifies a primary and vocal producer.
- ^{^[v]} signifies a vocal producer.
- "I Can Feel It" features an interpolation of "In the Air Tonight" by Phil Collins.
- "Stay" features an interpolation of "Stay" by Sugarland.

== Personnel ==
=== Musicians ===
- Kane Brown – lead vocals (all tracks), background vocals (tracks 1, 2, 8, 10–13, 16)
- David Huff – programming (tracks 1–3, 5, 6, 8, 9, 11–14, 17), background vocals (5)
- Dann Huff – programming (tracks 1–3, 8, 9, 11, 12), electric guitar (1, 3, 5, 6, 8, 9, 12, 13), background vocals (5), Dobro (12, 15), bass (12, 16)
- Alex Wright – synthesizer (tracks 1–3, 5, 6, 9, 11, 15, 18), piano (1, 5, 8, 9, 11, 17, 18), organ (2, 3, 17), Mellotron (15)
- Ilya Toshinskiy – acoustic guitar (tracks 1–3, 5, 6, 9, 11, 15, 17, 18), banjo (1), bouzouki (2, 3), Dobro (3), mandolin (3, 5, 16, 18), guitar (15)
- Josh Reedy – background vocals (tracks 1–3, 5, 6, 11–15, 17, 18)
- Derek Wells – electric guitar (tracks 1–3, 5, 6, 9, 11, 12, 15, 17, 18)
- Kris Donegan – electric guitar (tracks 1–3, 6, 8, 9, 11–15, 17, 18), acoustic guitar (16)
- Justin Niebank – programming (tracks 1–3, 6, 8, 9, 11–15, 17, 18)
- Mark Hill – bass (tracks 1, 2, 5, 6, 8, 9, 12–14, 18)
- Jerry Roe – drums (tracks 1, 2, 5, 11, 15), percussion (1), tambourine (11)
- Jaxson Free – background vocals (tracks 1, 9, 13, 16)
- Stuart Duncan – fiddle (track 2)
- Jonathan Capeci – background vocals (tracks 3, 5, 7, 10), programming (10)
- Jenee Fleenor – fiddle (tracks 3, 5, 13, 14, 16)
- Aaron Sterling – drums (tracks 3, 6, 9, 12–14, 16–18), tambourine (9, 16)
- Jimmie Lee Sloas – bass (tracks 3, 11, 15, 17)
- Ashlyne Blue – background vocals (track 5)
- Marcus Blue – background vocals (track 5)
- Kate Huff – background vocals (track 5)
- Sherri Huff – background vocals (track 5)
- Justin Schipper – steel guitar (tracks 6, 11, 15–17)
- Andrew Goldstein – background vocals, guitar, keyboards, programming (track 7)
- Khalid – vocals (track 7)
- Lars Thorson – fiddle (track 7)
- Paul Franklin – steel guitar (tracks 8, 12–14, 18)
- Charlie Judge – synthesizer (tracks 8, 12, 13), piano (8), organ (12, 14)
- Danny Rader – acoustic guitar (tracks 8, 12–14); banjo, bouzouki (8); 12-string guitar (14)
- Rob McNelley – electric guitar (tracks 8, 13, 14)
- Jelly Roll – vocals (track 8)
- Katelyn Brown – lead vocals, background vocals (tracks 10, 17)
- Nick Long – acoustic guitar (track 10)
- Nicholas Sainato – programming (track 10)
- Gabe Foust – programming (tracks 12, 16)
- Jesse Frasure – acoustic guitar, percussion, programming (track 14)
- Brad Paisley – vocals (track 14)

=== Technical ===
- Adam Ayan – mastering (tracks 1–3, 5–18)
- Zach Pereyra – mastering (track 4)
- Drew Bollman – mixing (tracks 1–3, 5, 6, 8, 9, 11–18), engineering (1, 3, 6, 9, 11, 16–18)
- Justin Niebank – mixing (tracks 1–3, 5, 6, 8, 9, 11–18), engineering (2, 5), editing (1, 6, 17)
- Manny Marroquin – mixing (track 4)
- Jeff Braun – mixing (tracks 7, 10)
- Eric Arjes – mixing, editing (track 10); engineering assistance (7)
- Gabe Foust – engineering (track 7), overdub engineering (13)
- Buckley Miller – engineering (tracks 8, 12–14)
- Jonathan Capeci – engineering, editing (track 10)
- Nicholas Sainato – engineering, editing (track 10)
- Josh Reedy – overdub engineering (tracks 1, 2, 5, 6, 11, 13–15, 17, 18), additional engineering (12)
- Aaron Sterling – overdub engineering (track 16)
- David Huff – editing (tracks 1, 2, 5, 6, 8, 9, 11–13, 17)
- Chris Small – editing (tracks 2, 8, 12, 13)
- Taylor Pollert – additional engineering (track 10)
- Austin Brown – engineering assistance (tracks 1, 3, 11, 15)
- Joey Stanca – engineering assistance (tracks 2, 5, 16)
- Anthony Vilchis – engineering assistance (track 4)
- Trey Station – engineering assistance (track 4)
- Zach Kuhlman – engineering assistance (tracks 6, 9, 18)
- Joe Trentacosti – engineering assistance (tracks 8, 12, 13)
- Will Kienzle – engineering assistance (track 14)

== Charts ==
=== Weekly charts ===
Weekly chart performance for The High Road
Chart (2025)	Peak position
Australian Albums (ARIA)	41
Australian Country Albums (ARIA)	6
Canadian Albums (Billboard)	18
UK Country Albums (OCC)	5
US Billboard 200	7
US Top Country Albums (Billboard)	2

=== Year-end charts ===
Year-end chart performance for The High Road
Chart (2025)	Position
US Billboard 200	188
US Top Country Albums (Billboard)	39
