= Backseat Driver =

2024 single by Kane Brown

Single by Kane Brown

from the album The High Road
- Released: October 11, 2024
- Genre: Country
- Length: 3:48
- Label: RCA Nashville
- Songwriters: Jacob Davis; Jordan Walker
- Producer: Dann Huff

Kane Brown singles chronology
"Miles on It" (2024)	"Backseat Driver" (2024)	"Body Talk" (2024)

Music video
- "Backseat Driver" on YouTube

"Backseat Driver" is a song by American country music singer Kane Brown, released on October 11, 2024, as the third single from his fourth studio album, The High Road (2025). It was written by Jacob Davis and Jordan Walker, and produced by Dann Huff.

== Background and content ==
Kane Brown teased the song on Father's Day in 2024 and in early October 2024 on social media. In the latter preview, he shared a video featuring snippets of his daughters, as well as that of himself recording the song.

The song centers around Brown cherishing his fatherhood. It depicts him driving around with his little daughter in the backseat. While Brown pays no special attention to the ordinary things in life, his daughter shows great curiosity and asks questions about them.

In an interview with Taste of Country Nights, Brown revealed his wife was annoyed at the starting lyrics ("7:30 in the morning in a Mickey D's drive-thru / Two muffins, one coffee and a little bitty orange juice"), explaining "I mean, I'm up at 7 or 7:30, but not for Mickey D's. We make our own breakfast. My wife's so organic." Brown said the line was relevant to him when he was in high school. The composer of the song allowed Brown to change any lyrics, but he decided to leave the song exactly as it was.

== Charts ==
=== Weekly charts ===
Weekly chart performance for "Backseat Driver"
Chart (2024–2025)	Peak position
Canada Hot 100 (Billboard)	87
Canada Country (Billboard)	4
US Billboard Hot 100	60
US Country Airplay (Billboard)	2
US Hot Country Songs (Billboard)	16

=== Year-end charts ===
Year-end chart performance for "Backseat Driver"
Chart (2025)	Position
Canada Country (Billboard)	24
US Country Airplay (Billboard)	20
US Hot Country Songs (Billboard)	34
