= Best for Me =

2024 single by Joyner Lucas and Jelly Roll

Single by Joyner Lucas and Jelly Roll

from the album Not Now I'm Busy
- Released: March 18, 2024
- Genre: Conscious hip hop
- Length: 3:58
- Label: Twenty Nine; The Orchard
- Songwriters: Gary Lucas Jr.; Jason DeFord
- Producers: Nox Beatz; Young Taylor; Charlie Chronopoulos; Leo Son; Young Lime; Ayoley; Chezka

Joyner Lucas singles chronology
"Sticks & Stones" (2024)	"Best for Me" (2024)	"Tantrum" (2024)

Jelly Roll singles chronology
"Halfway to Hell" (2024)	"Best for Me" (2024)	"Trailer in the Sky" (2024)

Music video
- "Best for Me" on YouTube

"Best for Me" is a song by American rapper Joyner Lucas and American singer Jelly Roll, released on March 18, 2024, as the seventh single from the former's second studio album, Not Now I'm Busy (2024). It was produced by Nox Beatz, Young Taylor, Charlie Chronopoulos, Leo Son, Young Lime, Ayoley and Chezka.

== Composition ==
Jelly Roll sings the chorus of the song, in which he questions on complexities in love, while Joyner Lucas raps about having a loved one who is struggling with drug addiction and abuse and his feeling about it, from both his own and their perspectives. The artists focus on the importance of offering support and compassion as well as reaching out for help.

== Critical reception ==
Zachary Horvath of HotNewHipHop stated that "Jelly Roll adds some extra soul with a terrific chorus and vocal performance."

== Charts ==
Chart performance for "Best for Me"
Chart (2024)	Peak position
New Zealand Hot Singles (RMNZ)	30
US Billboard Hot 100	93
US Hot R&B/Hip-Hop Songs (Billboard)	40
US Rhythmic Airplay (Billboard)	23
