= Not Now, I'm Busy =

Studio album by Joyner Lucas
- Released: March 22, 2024
- Recorded: 2023–2024
- Genre: Hip-hop
- Length: 62:31
- Labels: Twenty Nine; The Orchard
- Producers: Ayoley; Blank; Boi Yanel; Charlie Chronopoulos; Chezka; Dez Wright; DillyGotItBumpin; Grafh; Gray Hawken; KXVI; Kyle C.E; LeGunk; Leo Son; Mario Luciano; Mike Wavvs; Motif Alumni; Nox Beatz; Sarah Kennedy; Sayonara Beats; Storm; Teddi Jones; Turnmeupmar; UNKWN; Young Lime; Young Taylor

Joyner Lucas chronology
Evolution (2020)	Not Now, I'm Busy (2024)	ADHD 2 (2025)

Singles from Not Now, I'm Busy
- 1. "What's That?" Released: May 9, 2023; 2. "Cut U Off" Released: June 9, 2023; 3. "Broski" Released: June 23, 2023; 4. "Seventeen" Released: September 8, 2023; 5. "24 Hours to Live" Released: October 27, 2023; 6. "Sticks & Stones" Released: March 1, 2024; 7. "Best for Me" Released: March 18, 2024

Not Now, I'm Busy is the second studio album by American rapper Joyner Lucas. It was released on March 22, 2024, by his self-owned label, Twenty Nine Music Group. The album features guest appearances by YoungBoy Never Broke Again, Conway the Machine, Jelly Roll, Symba, the late DMX, Logic, Twista and Nefertitti Avani.

== Background ==
On March 8, 2023, Lucas uploaded to social media, announcing that the cover art for his upcoming studio album would be released soon with a single released on March 10, 2023, called "Devil's Work 2", the sequel to the original song from his debut album, ADHD. On March 9, the artwork was released, revealing the album's title.

On April 3, 2023, Lucas announced another single called "Blackout", featuring Future, which was released on April 7, 2023.

The album was intended to be released on August 18, 2023. However, it did not release on that date, and on November 1, 2023, Lucas announced via Instagram that he was reworking the album due to fan response and negative feedback on the previously released singles. On February 26, 2024, Lucas announced the album was complete, and on March 1, announced that the album would be released on March 22, 2024.

The album was released on pre-sale via Apple Music and revealed that both "Devil's Work 2" and "Blackout" were no longer part of the album, although previously intended to be.

== Singles ==
The first official lead single to the album was "What's That?", released on May 9, 2023.

The second single off the album was "Cut U Off" with Louisiana rapper YoungBoy Never Broke Again, marking the first collaboration between the two. The single was released on June 9, 2023.

The third single was "Broski", released on June 23, 2023. The single "exhibits the intricate storytelling that he is best known for and details how people become envious of those they previously supported," by Karan Singh via HipHopDX.

The album's fourth single was "Seventeen", released on September 8, 2023.

The fifth single was "24 Hours to Live", released on October 27, 2023.

The sixth single, titled "Sticks & Stones", saw Lucas accompanied by New York native Conway the Machine. The single was released on March 1, 2024, marking Lucas' first release of 2024.

The seventh and final single released was "Best for Me", which features vocals from American country singer Jelly Roll. It was released on March 18, 2024, four days before the album's release.

== Critical reception ==
Professional ratings
Review scores
Source	Rating
AllMusic	3/5 stars
HipHopDX	5.2/10

Not Now, I'm Busy received mixed reviews from critics. Reviewers generally praised Joyner Lucas' technical ability and lyrical skill, but were divided on the album's tone and execution. One review highlighted Lucas' "technical excellence and light-speed lyricism" and described the album's "clean production" and stylistic variety, noting collaborations with artists such as Logic, Twista, and YoungBoy Never Broke Again. However, the critic also observed that while "the best moments of the album" support Lucas' confident themes, some tracks "miss their marks," and that his repeated assertions of superiority could feel "belabored." HipHopDX commended Lucas as "a gifted technical lyricist" who raps "eloquently and cleverly," but criticized the album as "hollow" and "vindictive," arguing that despite its lyrical pyrotechnics, "the bars may be hot, but Not Now, I'm Busy is not much fun at all."

== Track listing ==
Not Now, I'm Busy track listing
No.	Title	Writer(s)	Producer(s)	Length
1.	"Put Me On"	Gary Maurice Lucas Jr.	Leo Son; Turnmeupmar	3:37
2.	"I'm Ill"	Lucas	Leo Son	3:13
3.	"Waiting on This"	Lucas	Leo Son; Sayonara Beats	3:28
4.	"Broski"	Lucas	Mike Wavvs; Nox Beatz; Gray Hawken; Kyle C.E; Leo Son; Blank	5:14
5.	"Fake Promises"	Lucas	Grafh; Leo Son; DillyGotItBumpin; Sarah Kennedy	3:05
6.	"When I Need Love"	Lucas	Leo Son	3:49
7.	"Cut U Off" (with YoungBoy Never Broke Again)	Lucas; Kentrell DeSean Gaulden; Leo Edward Son; Donna Harkness	Leo Son; Storm	3:23
8.	"What's That?"	Lucas	Dez Wright; UNKWN; Leo Son	3:27
9.	"Sticks & Stones" (with Conway the Machine)	Lucas; Demond Price	Mario Luciano; Leo Son; Boi Yanel	3:44
10.	"Best for Me" (with Jelly Roll)	Lucas; Jason Bradley DeFord	Nox Beatz; Young Taylor; Charlie Chronopoulos; Leo Son; Young Lime; Ayoley; Chezka	3:58
11.	"I Didn't Go" (featuring DMX and Symba)	Lucas; Earl Simmons; Demario Driver	Leo Son; Teddi Jones	5:48
12.	"Three Little Pigs"	Lucas	Leo Son	3:11
13.	"24 Hours to Live"	Lucas	Storm; KXVI; Leo Son	3:28
14.	"Still Alright" (featuring Logic and Twista)	Lucas; Sir Robert Bryson Hall II; Carl Mitchell	Leo Son	3:39
15.	"Seventeen"	Lucas; Son	Leo Son	3:24
16.	"How Much Do You Love Me?"	Lucas	Leo Son	3:03
17.	"Not Now, I'm Busy" (featuring Nefertitti Avani)	Lucas; Nefertitti Avani Hakim Day	Motif Alumni; LeGunk; Leo Son	3:00
Total length:				62:31

Notes

- "When I Need Love" contains samples from "Who Can I Run To", written by Charles B. Simmons, Frank Alstin Jr, and Richard Roebuck, as performed by Xscape.
- "I'm Ill" contains samples from "Can You Feel the Beat", written by Full Force, as performed by Lisa Lisa and Cult Jam.

== Charts ==
Chart performance for Not Now, I'm Busy
Chart (2024)	Peak position
Canadian Albums (Billboard)	70
UK Album Downloads (Official Charts)	24
US Billboard 200	42
US Independent Albums (Billboard)	6
US Top R&B/Hip-Hop Albums (Billboard)	14
