= Bunnie Xo =

American podcaster

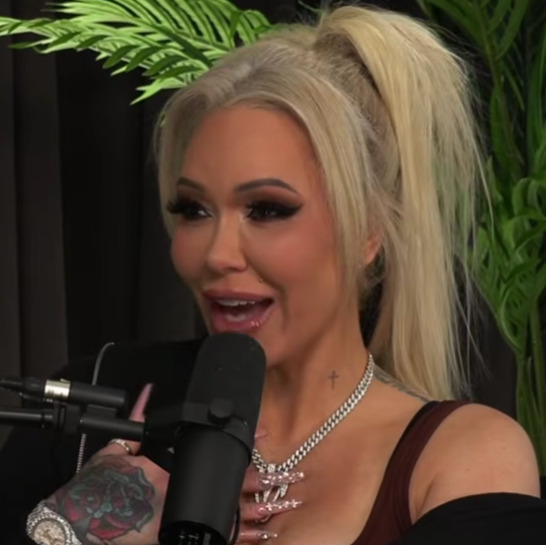
- Bunnie Xo in 2024
- Born: Alisa Andrea Carter; January 22, 1980 (age 46); Houston, Texas, U.S.
- Occupation: Podcaster
- Spouse: Jelly Roll (m. 2016; div. 2026)

YouTube information
- Channel: bunniexo
- Years active: 2018–present
- Subscribers: 1.11 million
- Last updated: April 6, 2026
- Website: hunniebunnies.com

Alisa Andrea DeFord (née Carter), known as Bunnie Xo, is an American podcast host and media producer. She is the founder of Dumb Blonde Productions and the host of the Dumb Blonde Podcast, an interview-based program. Her work is primarily focused on long-form conversations with guests from the entertainment and music industries.

She married musician Jelly Roll in 2016. On June 15, 2026, TMZ reported that Jelly Roll had filed for divorce on May 18, after nearly ten years of marriage. On July 17, 2026, it was announced that the divorce was finalized.

== Career ==
She hosts the Dumb Blonde podcast, a comedy and interview podcast featuring guests from entertainment, music, and popular culture. The show is also released in video form and is distributed on streaming platforms, including Kick. Guests have included Dolly Parton, Miranda Lambert, Jon Bon Jovi, Machine Gun Kelly, Wiz Khalifa, and Jelly Roll among others.

In 2026, Bunnie Xo published the memoir Stripped Down: Unfiltered and Unapologetic, discussing aspects of her personal experiences and professional life.
