= Creature (Jelly Roll song) =

2020 song by Jelly Roll featuring Tech N9ne and Krizz Kaliko

Song by Jelly Roll featuring Tech N9ne and Krizz Kaliko

from the album A Beautiful Disaster
- Released: March 13, 2020
- Genre: Hip hop
- Length: 3:59
- Label: War Dog; Strange Music
- Songwriters: Jason DeFord; Aaron Yates; Samuel Watson; Casey Jarvis; Christopher Fulton; Michael Summers
- Producers: Jarvis; Fulton; Seven

Music video
- "Creature" on YouTube

"Creature" is a song by American rapper Jelly Roll from his sixth solo studio album A Beautiful Disaster (2020). It features fellow American rappers Tech N9ne and Krizz Kaliko, and was produced by Casey Jarvis, Christopher Fulton and Seven.

== Background ==
Tech N9ne's verse was originally composed for "The Bottom", another track on A Beautiful Disaster, as Jelly Roll thought the song had suited him due to its "choppy" style. As Tech N9ne was halfway through writing his verse and Jelly Roll was writing his own verse, which he planned to be the second verse of the song, Jelly Roll called Tech and asked how far he had written into his. Tech sent him a picture of his lyrics, following which Jelly Roll decided he had another song that could be a better fit for them and sent it to Tech. Tech's verse was then used for the song, which became "Creature".

After releasing the song, Jelly Roll wrote on YouTube:

I hope this song helps somebody out there today. This song was written for all of those who have had to embrace the monsters in under their beds and the demons outside their windows. This is for those who have struggled in life and had to overcome sometimes sadly by having to accept. This for those that dare to be different.

== Content ==
The song finds Jelly Roll detailing his mind as an addict and battling his inner demons, which he metaphorically refers to as monsters, dragons and the boogeyman.

== Certifications ==
Region	Certification	Certified units/sales
United States (RIAA)	Platinum	1,000,000^{‡}
^{‡} Sales+streaming figures based on certification alone.
