= Haunted (Kane Brown and Jelly Roll song) =

2025 song by Kane Brown and Jelly Roll

Song by Kane Brown and Jelly Roll

from the album The High Road
- Released: January 24, 2025
- Genre: Country; country rock
- Length: 4:24
- Label: RCA Nashville
- Songwriters: Kane Brown; Gabe Foust; Jaxson Free
- Producer: Dann Huff

Music video
- "Haunted" on YouTube

"Haunted" is a song by American country music singers Kane Brown and Jelly Roll, released on January 24, 2025, from the former's fourth studio album, The High Road. It was written by Brown himself, Gabe Foust and Jaxson Free and produced by Dann Huff.

== Background ==
Kane Brown wrote the song at the Stock Exchange Hotel in Manchester. The title was derived from his bank vault room key which looked "haunted" to Brown.

Brown had already heard of Jelly Roll before the latter entered the country music industry, through mutual friends. Jelly Roll hated Brown at that time. After learning this through their friend Taylor Phillips, Brown reached out to Jelly Roll to build friendly relations with him. They developed a friendship by playing Call of Duty together. When Brown wrote "Haunted", he thought of Jelly Roll appearing on it. During the shooting of the music video, Jelly Roll first said into the camera "I used to fucking hate this dude!" in front of Brown's team, before following with "But now I love this guy!"

On January 10, 2025, Brown previewed the song on social media. He shared the snippet with a message: "Sneak preview of a heavy song about depression and horrible thoughts and feelings that I feel like a lot of us go through but don't like to talk about with other people. If you relate to the song at all just know that you're not alone and I love you."

== Composition and lyrics ==
The instrumental contains electric guitar and skittering drums, while the lyrics focus on the anguish and depression suffered from both artists. Kane Brown and Jelly Roll emphasize the notion that fame and fortune do not prevent their mental health struggles—in fact, they may even intensify them. The two also describe how they have considered suicide and Jelly Roll mentions battling with substance abuse. Brown sings on the chorus, "'Cause I'm haunted by the voice in my head / I'm haunted by the taste of that lead / I wanted too many times to jump off of the edge / Thinkin' I was better off dead".

== Charts ==
=== Weekly charts ===
Chart performance for "Haunted"
Chart (2025)	Peak position
Canada Hot 100 (Billboard)	79
US Billboard Hot 100	58
US Hot Country Songs (Billboard)	14

=== Year-end charts ===
Year-end chart performance for "Haunted"
Chart (2025)	Position
US Hot Country Songs (Billboard)	64
