= Miles on It =

Single by Marshmello and Kane Brown

from the album The High Road
- Released: May 3, 2024
- Genre: Country pop; bro-country
- Length: 2:50
- Label: Joytime Collective; Columbia
- Songwriters: Marshmello; Kane Brown; Castle; Connor McDonough; Earwulf; Jake Torrey; Digital Farm Animals; Riley McDonough
- Producer: Marshmello

Marshmello singles chronology
"T34rs" (2024)	"Miles on It" (2024)	"Don't Speak" (2024)

Kane Brown singles chronology
"The One (Pero No Como Yo)" (2024)	"Miles on It" (2024)	"Backseat Driver" (2024)

Music video
- "Miles on It" on YouTube

"Miles on It" is a song by American producer Marshmello and American singer Kane Brown. It was released on May 3, 2024, as the second single from Brown's fourth studio album, The High Road. The song was written by Marshmello, Brown, Castle, Connor McDonough, Earwulf, Jake Torrey, Digital Farm Animals and Riley McDonough. It is the second collaboration between the two artists since "One Thing Right" from 2019.

== Commercial performance ==
"Miles on It" is Marshmello's first top-20 hit since his 2021 collaboration with the Jonas Brothers, "Leave Before You Love Me". The single is the first to reached top 5 on both the Hot Dance/Electronic Songs (where it reached No. 1) and the Hot Country Songs chart on its debut. It debuted at number 30 on the Country Airplay chart for week ending May 18, 2024. and peaked at number one the week ending November 2, 2024. It is Marshmello's first and Brown's twelfth number one on that chart.

== Music video ==
The music video was directed by Alex Alvga and premiered on May 28, 2024.

== Charts ==
=== Weekly charts ===
Weekly chart performance for "Miles on It"
Chart (2024–2025)	Peak position
Australia (ARIA)	59
Australia Country Hot 50 (The Music)	13
Belarus Airplay (TopHit)	11
Belgium (Ultratop 50 Flanders)	13
Canada Hot 100 (Billboard)	10
Canada AC (Billboard)	5
Canada CHR/Top 40 (Billboard)	6
Canada Country (Billboard)	1
Canada Hot AC (Billboard)	16
CIS Airplay (TopHit)	27
Estonia Airplay (TopHit)	23
Global 200 (Billboard)	55
Ireland (IRMA)	100
Lithuania Airplay (TopHit)	29
Netherlands (Dutch Top 40)	4
Netherlands (Single Top 100)	47
New Zealand Hot Singles (RMNZ)	15
Poland (Polish Airplay Top 100)	20
Russia Airplay (TopHit)	33
UK Singles (OCC)	44
US Billboard Hot 100	15
US Adult Pop Airplay (Billboard)	14
US Country Airplay (Billboard)	1
US Hot Country Songs (Billboard)	4
US Hot Dance/Electronic Songs (Billboard)	1
US Pop Airplay (Billboard)	18

=== Monthly charts ===
Monthly chart performance for "Miles on It"
Chart (2024)	Peak position
Belarus Airplay (TopHit)	12
CIS Airplay (TopHit)	38
Estonia Airplay (TopHit)	28
Lithuania Airplay (TopHit)	51
Russia Airplay (TopHit)	49

=== Year-end charts ===
2024 year-end chart performance for "Miles on It"
Chart (2024)	Position
Belarus Airplay (TopHit)	66
Belgium (Ultratop 50 Flanders)	73
Canada (Canadian Hot 100)	22
CIS Airplay (TopHit)	151
Estonia Airplay (TopHit)	77
Global 200 (Billboard)	158
Netherlands (Dutch Top 40)	17
US Billboard Hot 100	34
US Adult Top 40 (Billboard)	39
US Country Airplay (Billboard)	48
US Hot Country Songs (Billboard)	11
US Hot Dance/Electronic Songs (Billboard)	2
US Mainstream Top 40 (Billboard)	45

2025 year-end chart performance for "Miles on It"
Chart (2025)	Position
Australia (ARIA)	96
Belgium (Ultratop 50 Flanders)	78
Canada (Canadian Hot 100)	59
Canada AC (Billboard)	35
Canada Country (Billboard)	54
Canada Hot AC (Billboard)	58
US Country Airplay (Billboard)	56
US Hot Country Songs (Billboard)	52
US Hot Dance/Electronic Songs (Billboard)	1

== Certifications ==
Certifications for "Miles on It"
Region	Certification	Certified units/sales
Australia (ARIA)	Platinum	70,000^{‡}
Belgium (BRMA)	Gold	20,000^{‡}
Canada (Music Canada)	3× Platinum	240,000^{‡}
New Zealand (RMNZ)	Gold	15,000^{‡}
United Kingdom (BPI)	Gold	400,000^{‡}
United States (RIAA)	4× Platinum	4,000,000^{‡}
^{‡} Sales+streaming figures based on certification alone.

== See also ==
- List of Billboard number-one dance songs of 2024
- List of Billboard number-one dance songs of 2025
