= I Can Feel It (Kane Brown song) =

Single by Kane Brown

from the album The High Road
- Released: September 21, 2023
- Genre: Country
- Length: 2:43
- Label: RCA Nashville
- Songwriters: Kane Brown; Gabe Foust; Jaxson Free; Phil Collins
- Producer: Dann Huff

Kane Brown singles chronology
"Bury Me in Georgia" (2023)	"I Can Feel It" (2023)	"The One (Pero No Como Yo)" (2024)

"I Can Feel It" is a song by American country music singer Kane Brown. It was released on September 21, 2023 as the lead single from his fourth studio album, The High Road. It made the Billboard charts that month, and became his eleventh number one on the Country Airplay chart, and the twelfth of his career overall.

== Background ==
Kane Brown co-wrote "I Can Feel It" with Gabe Foust and Jaxson Free. It was produced by Dann Huff. The song is Brown's follow up to his highly successful hit, "Bury Me in Georgia". It was noted by Stereogum in September 2023 that Brown's song was the third song that week to interpret "In the Air Tonight" by Phil Collins. Even though the song does draw a fair bit from Phil Collins's 1981 song, the tempo is much faster. Collins also received a songwriting credit.

== Personnel ==
- Dann Huff – electric guitar
- Aaron Sterling – drums
- Charles Judge – synthesizer
- Danny Rader – acoustic guitar
- Cris Donegan – electric guitar
- Rob McNelley – electric guitar
- Mark Hill – bass
- Paul Franklin – steel guitar
- Jaxson Free – backing vocals
- Josh Reedy – backing vocals

== Chart performance ==
"I Can Feel It" debuted at number 30 on the U.S. Billboard Hot Country Songs chart for the week of October 7, 2023. It also debuted at number 59 on the U.S. Billboard Hot 100 and debuted at number 58 on the Canadian Hot 100 chart for the week of January 13, 2024.

== Charts ==
=== Weekly charts ===
Weekly chart performance
Chart (2023–2024)	Peak position
Canada Hot 100 (Billboard)	58
Canada Country (Billboard)	2
UK Country Airplay (Radiomonitor)	3
US Billboard Hot 100	50
US Country Airplay (Billboard)	1
US Hot Country Songs (Billboard)	13

=== Year-end charts ===
Year-end chart performance
Chart (2024)	Position
US Country Airplay (Billboard)	24
US Hot Country Songs (Billboard)	43
US Radio Songs (Billboard)	64

== Certifications ==
Certifications for "I Can Feel It"
Region	Certification	Certified units/sales
Canada (Music Canada)	Platinum	80,000^{‡}
United States (RIAA)	Gold	500,000^{‡}
^{‡} Sales+streaming figures based on certification alone.
