= Heavens to Betsy (song) =

2024 song by Jackson Dean

Single by Jackson Dean

from the album On the Back of My Dreams
- Released: August 19, 2024
- Genre: Country
- Length: 3:24
- Label: BMLG
- Songwriters: Jackson Dean; Benjy Davis; Driver Williams
- Producer: Luke Dick

Jackson Dean singles chronology
"Fearless (The Echo)" (2023)	"Heavens to Betsy" (2024)	"Make a Liar" (2026)

"Heavens to Betsy" is a song by American country singer Jackson Dean. It was released to U.S. country radio on August 19, 2024, as the lead single from his second studio album, On the Back of My Dreams. Dean co-wrote the song with Benjy Davis and Driver Williams, and it was produced by Luke Dick.

== Content ==
Williams suggested the titular phrase as a possible song title during a writing session, and Dean started formulating the lyrics, largely inspired by his late grandparents. Davis assisted in two co-write the song, which finds the narrator communicating through a "CB radio-esque" method to those in the afterlife.

An extended version of the song was released on October 25, 2024. This version was used on CD/LP releases of On the Back of the My Dreams, while the original track on digital and streaming releases was 3:24, shortening the intro and cutting off the outro. In a Country Aircheck interview with BMLG EVP/A&R Allison Jones, she said, "we knew it would either get talked over or they'd do their own edit. But [Dean's] extremely proud of the full track. We prefer to deliver it edited because we don't want edits made that aren't artist approved."

== Music video ==
The official music video for "Heavens to Betsy" premiered on August 5, 2024.

== Charts ==
=== Weekly charts ===
Weekly chart performance for "Heavens to Betsy"
Chart (2024–2025)	Peak position
Canada (Canadian Hot 100)	82
Canada Country (Billboard)	39
US Billboard Hot 100	71
US Country Airplay (Billboard)	2
US Hot Country Songs (Billboard)	20

=== Year-end charts ===
Year-end chart performance for "Heavens to Betsy"
Chart (2025)	Position
US Country Airplay (Billboard)	25
