= Evolution (Joyner Lucas EP) =

EP by Joyner Lucas
- Released: October 23, 2020
- Recorded: 2020
- Genre: Hip-hop
- Length: 39:28
- Label: Twenty Nine Music Group
- Producers: Al Hug; BJ Beatz; Boi-1da; CAMEone; Curtis Crump Jr.; DillyGotItBumpin; Dmac; Donato; Jahaan Sweet; Jordan Rakei; Juicebox Slim; Koda; Kyle Stemberger; Leo Son; Mr. Carmack; Nick Papz; Samarei; Superstaar Beats; Tom Misch; YogiTheProducer; Yung Talent

Joyner Lucas chronology
ADHD (2020)	Evolution (2020)	Not Now, I'm Busy (2024)

Singles from Evolution
- 1. "Fall Slowly" Released: September 2, 2020; 2. "Snitch" Released: October 21, 2020

Evolution is the debut extended play by American rapper Joyner Lucas. It was released on October 23, 2020, by Twenty Nine Music Group. The album features guest appearances from The Game, Iyla, Ashanti, Rick Ross, and Elijah James.

== Singles ==
Lucas released the first single, "Fall Slowly", featuring Ashanti, on September 2, 2020. The song was certified gold by the RIAA on October 22, 2024. The second single, "Snitch", was released on October 21, 2020, two days before the release of the full EP.

== Cover art ==
The cover art depicts Lucas' son, Joyner Messiah Lucas, covered in jewellery, with an orange backdrop.

== Critical reception ==
Quincy of Ratings Games Music gave the EP a "B" rating, writing: "While he has found a way to compete with the top rappers in the game, he has also found unique ways to separate himself from the brain-dead rappers that we tend to fuck with. Joyner is literally creating his own lane, and I think Evolution makes that lane he’s trying to create clearer than ever."

== Track listing ==
Evolution track listing
No.	Title	Writer(s)	Producer(s)	Length
1.	"When I Grow Up (Intro)"	Gary Lucas	Leo Son	1:15
2.	"Evolution"	Lucas	Tom Misch; Mr. Carmack; Jordan Rakei	2:33
3.	"On This Way" (featuring The Game and Iyla)	Lucas; Jayceon Terrell Taylor; Iyla Blue	Boi-1da; Jahaan Sweet	4:39
4.	"Zim Zimma"	Lucas	Leo Son; Juicebox Slim	3:59
5.	"Tattle Tales (Skit)"	Lucas	Leo Son	1:16
6.	"Snitch"	Lucas	Kyle Stemberger; Superstar Beats	2:51
7.	"Str8 Like Dat"	Lucas	Dmac; BJ Beatz	3:27
8.	"Fall Slowly" (featuring Ashanti)	Lucas; Ashanti Douglas	Koda; Yung Talent; Nick Papz	4:52
9.	"The Problem"	Lucas	Boi-1da; Samarei; Al Hug; Curtis Crump Jr.; CAMEone; DillyGotItBmpin; YogiTheProducer	3:42
10.	"Legend" (featuring Rick Ross)	Lucas; William Roberts II	DillyGotItBumpin	4:18
11.	"Father's Day (Skit)"	Lucas	Leo Son	1:25
12.	"Like a River" (featuring Elijah James)	Lucas; Elijah James	Leo Son; Donato	5:06
Total length:				39:28

== Charts ==
Chart performance for Evolution
Chart (2020)	Peak position
US Billboard 200	49
Australian Albums (ARIA)	45
Canadian Albums (Billboard)	37
