= Cut U Off =

2023 single by Joyner Lucas and YoungBoy Never Broke Again

Single by Joyner Lucas and YoungBoy Never Broke Again

from the album Not Now, I'm Busy
- Released: June 9, 2023
- Genre: Hip hop; trap
- Length: 3:23
- Label: Twenty Nine; The Orchard
- Songwriters: Gary Lucas Jr.; Kentrell DeSean Gaulden; Leo Edward Son; Donna Harkness
- Producers: Leo Son; Storm

Joyner Lucas singles chronology
"What's That?" (2023)	"Cut U Off" (2023)	"Broski" (2023)

YoungBoy Never Broke Again singles chronology
"Won't Back Down" (2023)	"Cut U Off" (2023)	"Project Walls" (2023)

"Cut U Off" is a song by American rappers Joyner Lucas and YoungBoy Never Broke Again, released on June 9, 2023, as the second single from the former's second studio album Not Now, I'm Busy (2024). It was produced by Leo Son and Storm. The song marks the first collaboration between Joyner Lucas and NBA YoungBoy.

== Composition ==
Joyner Lucas raps the first verse, followed by both rappers delivering the hook. In his verse, Joyner raps, "Rather not associate with suckers, we don't need no ties, sick of niggas acting like they motherfuckin' sneaker size", referring to removing fake friends from his life and maintaining his peace. In the second verse, YoungBoy's aggressive lyrics are directed toward the shady women in his life, rapping, "She leave out, know they entering in a minute / She don't like me, I know she just want to get it / Had to kick the bitch out for playing with me".

== Critical reception ==
Lavender Alexandria of HotNewHipHop praised the collaboration, writing "'Cut U Off' starts lowkey and gives both artists the chance to flex their lyrical game. Once the beat drops though it becomes a high-energy banger. Surprisingly, Youngboy morphs his sound quite a bit to blend in with Joyner's energy and the results are great."

== Charts ==
Chart performance for "Cut U Off"
Chart (2023)	Peak position
New Zealand Hot Singles (RMNZ)	27
