= Sticks & Stones (Joyner Lucas and Conway the Machine song) =

2024 single by Joyner Lucas and Conway the Machine

Single by Joyner Lucas and Conway the Machine

from the album Not Now, I'm Busy
- Released: March 1, 2024
- Genre: Hip hop
- Length: 3:44
- Label: Twenty Nine; The Orchard
- Songwriters: Gary Lucas Jr.; Demond Price
- Producers: Mario Luciano; Leo Son; Boi Yanel

Joyner Lucas singles chronology
"24 Hours to Live" (2023)	"Sticks & Stones" (2024)	"Best for Me" (2024)

Conway the Machine singles chronology
"Vertino" (2024)	"Sticks & Stones" (2024)

Music video
- "Sticks & Stones" on YouTube

"Sticks & Stones" is a song by American rappers Joyner Lucas and Conway the Machine, released on March 1, 2024, as the sixth single from the former's second studio album Not Now, I'm Busy (2024). It was produced by Mario Luciano, Leo Son, and Boi Yanel.

== Composition ==
The track sees Joyner Lucas delving into the complexities of fame and the challenges of dealing with criticism and betrayal. Reflecting on his personal struggles, he raps, "I've seen my whole family stab my back, I should have known / They say sticks and stones will break your bones, I'm sticks and stones". Conway the Machine's verse features his own reflections on overcoming adversity.

== Music video ==
The single's release was accompanied by a music video. Directed by Trevor Finney, it shows clips of Lucas and Conway the Machine in New York City, traversing the streets with their crews in Times Square.

== Charts ==
Chart performance for "Sticks & Stones"
Chart (2024)	Peak position
New Zealand Hot Singles (RMNZ)	38
