= Son of a Sinner =

Single by Jelly Roll

from the album Ballads of the Broken
- Released: March 31, 2022
- Genre: Country rock
- Length: 3:50
- Label: BBR
- Songwriters: Jason DeFord; Ernest Keith Smith; David Ray Stevens
- Producers: Ernest Keith Smith; Ilya Toshinsky

Jelly Roll singles chronology
| "Dead Man Walking" (2021) | "Son of a Sinner" (2022) | "Need a Favor" (2022) |

"Son of a Sinner" is a song by American musician Jelly Roll. It is the second single from his eighth studio album Ballads of the Broken. The song is also Jelly Roll's first single release to the country music format.

== Content ==
Jason DeFord, known professionally as Jelly Roll, wrote the song with David Ray Stevens and Ernest Keith Smith. Jelly Roll and Stevens were writing songs together at the Sound Emporium in Nashville, Tennessee when Ernest stopped to visit the two. According to Ernest, he let Jelly Roll play one of his guitars, which was set to drop D tuning, at which point Jelly Roll came up with the song's chorus. Ernest then encouraged Jelly Roll to write the verses by himself, as he thought doing so would allow the song to be more autobiographical.

The song is about Jelly Roll's personal life as a traveling musician, as well as his personal struggles with "right and wrong" and drug addiction. Jelly Roll told Billboard that he was intoxicated while recording the vocal track. The final recording uses a guitar track created and produced by Ernest, with additional production from session musician Ilya Toshinsky. Tom Roland of Billboard described the song as "mainstream country rock" featuring power chords, slide guitar, and a bass guitar line with "a flurry of notes uncommon in the country genre".

== Chart performance ==
In the United States, "Son of a Sinner" charted for over 20 weeks on the Hot Rock & Alternative Songs chart. It also debuted on the Country Airplay chart dated March 12, 2022, predating its official release to country radio stations on March 31.

== Charts ==
=== Weekly charts ===
Weekly chart performance for "Son of a Sinner"
| Chart (2022–2023) | Peak position |
|---|---|
| Canada Hot 100 (Billboard) | 61 |
| Canada Country (Billboard) | 7 |
| US Billboard Hot 100 | 31 |
| US Country Airplay (Billboard) | 1 |
| US Hot Country Songs (Billboard) | 8 |
| US Hot Rock & Alternative Songs (Billboard) | 4 |

=== Year-end charts ===
2022 year-end chart performance for "Son of a Sinner"
| Chart (2022) | Position |
|---|---|
| US Country Airplay (Billboard) | 44 |
| US Digital Song Sales (Billboard) | 35 |
| US Hot Country Songs (Billboard) | 18 |
| US Hot Rock & Alternative Songs (Billboard) | 10 |

2023 year-end chart performance for "Son of a Sinner"
| Chart (2023) | Position |
|---|---|
| US Country Airplay (Billboard) | 45 |
| US Hot Country Songs (Billboard) | 52 |
| US Hot Rock & Alternative Songs (Billboard) | 15 |

== Certifications ==
| Region | Certification | Certified units/sales |
|---|---|---|
| New Zealand (RMNZ) | Gold | 15,000^{‡} |
| United States (RIAA) | 2× Platinum | 2,000,000^{‡} |
^{‡} Sales+streaming figures based on certification alone.
