= Ballads of the Broken =

Studio album by Jelly Roll
- Released: September 17, 2021
- Studios: Sound Emporium (Nashville); Wardog (Nashville); Blackbird (Nashville); Melody Market (Dickson); Station West (Nashville)
- Genres: Pop; country; hip-hop; Southern rock
- Length: 31:02
- Labels: Bailee & Buddy; BBR
- Producers: Angel Maldonado Andrew Baylis; Ernest K.; David Ray Stevens; Ilya Toshinskiy

Jelly Roll chronology
Waylon & Willie IV (2020)	Ballads of the Broken (2021)	Whitsitt Chapel (2023)

Singles from Ballads of the Broken
- 1. "Dead Man Walking" Released: October 26, 2021; 2. "Son of a Sinner" Released: March 31, 2022

Ballads of the Broken is the eighth and major-label debut studio album by American singer-songwriter Jelly Roll, released on September 17, 2021, through Bailee & Buddy and BBR Music Group. It includes the singles "Dead Man Walking", which reached number one on the US Mainstream Rock chart, and "Son of a Sinner", which reached the top 40 on the US Billboard Hot 100 and number one on the Country Airplay chart. The success of "Son of a Sinner", one of the few Nashville country-influenced songs on the album, inspired Jelly Roll to fully take on a country sound for his following album, Whitsitt Chapel (2023).

== Critical reception ==
Professional ratings
Review scores
Source	Rating
AllMusic	3.5/5 stars

A staff review on AllMusic called it "short and surprising" due to the "evolution" in Jelly Roll's sound and his taking "a different stylistic approach than his usual countrified rap on almost every track, going from country-adjacent hooks [on] 'Son of a Sinner' to eerie, remorse-filled pop tunes [on] 'Over You'." The review also highlighted Jelly Roll's "soulful vocals and the twangy backing [as] the main points of interest here", and felt that to longtime fans, the slight shift in his sound "shouldn't be too much of a jolt" after Self Medicated (2020).

== Track listing ==
Ballads of the Broken track listing
No.	Title	Writer(s)	Length
1.	"Dead Man Walking"	Andrew Baylis; Jason DeFord; David Ray Stevens; Michael Whitworth	3:21
2.	"Backslide"	Baylis; DeFord; Stevens; Whitworth	3:03
3.	"Son of a Sinner"	DeFord; Stevens; Ernest Keith Smith	3:52
4.	"Over You"	Baylis; DeFord; Stevens	2:16
5.	"Hollow"	Baylis; DeFord; Stevens; Quint Collins	3:13
6.	"Even Angels Cry"	Baylis; DeFord; Stevens	2:53
7.	"Sober"	DeFord; Stevens	2:36
8.	"Empty House"	Baylis; DeFord; Stevens	3:32
9.	"Mobile Home" (demo)	DeFord; Stevens	2:21
10.	"Son of a Sinner" (demo)	DeFord; Stevens; Smith	3:55
Total length:			31:02

== Personnel ==
Musicians

- Jelly Roll – vocals
- Jayden Panesso – additional programming
- Shannon Forrest – drums
- Justin Abraham – drums
- Cole Clark – drums
- Craig Young – bass guitar
- Rob McNelley – electric guitar
- Gabe Baker – cello
- Ilya Toshinskiy – acoustic guitar, electric slide guitar
- Stu Stapleton – additional keyboards
- Jack Fowler – additional guitar
- David Ray Stevens – additional vocals
- Michael Whitworth – additional vocals

Technical

- Andrew Baylis – production (1, 2, 4–10), mixing (9, 10), engineering (all tracks)
- Ernest K. – production (3, 10)
- Ilya Toshinskiy – production (3), additional engineering (all tracks)
- David Ray Stevens – production (9); additional production, engineering (all tracks)
- Eric "Wee Wee" Flemming – additional production
- Joe LaPorta – mastering (1–6, 8–10)
- Still Matthews – mastering (7)
- F. Reid Shippen – mixing (1, 2, 4–8)
- Buckley Miller – mixing (3)
- Joe Trentacosti – engineering
- Lowell Reynolds – engineering
- Jason Mott – engineering
- Myle Manner – engineering
- Aaron Chmielewski – additional engineering
- Brad Winters – additional engineering
- Shannon Forrest – additional engineering

Visuals

- Don Henson – art direction, design, photography
- Meme Shahan – art direction, design
- Lou Miceli Jr. – art direction, design

== Charts ==
2021 chart performance for Ballads of the Broken
Chart (2021)	Peak position
US Billboard 200	157
US Independent Albums (Billboard)	21
US Top Rock Albums (Billboard)	41

2024–2025 chart performance for Ballads of the Broken
Chart (2024–2025)	Peak position
UK Christian & Gospel Albums (OCC)	16
UK Country Albums (Official Charts)	14

== Certifications ==
Region	Certification	Certified units/sales
United States (RIAA)	Gold	500,000^{‡}
^{‡} Sales+streaming figures based on certification alone.
