= Halfway to Hell =

Single by Jelly Roll

from the album Whitsitt Chapel
- Released: January 22, 2024
- Genre: Country
- Length: 2:58 (album version); 2:43 (radio edit)
- Label: BBR
- Songwriters: Jason DeFord; Jesse Frasure; Matt Jenkins; Jessie Jo Dillon
- Producers: Jesse Frasure; Zach Crowell

Jelly Roll singles chronology
"Chevrolet" (2023)	"Halfway to Hell" (2024)	"I Am Not Okay" (2024)

"Halfway to Hell" is a song by American singer Jelly Roll. It was released on January 22, 2024, as the third single from his ninth studio album, Whitsitt Chapel.

== History ==
Jelly Roll wrote the song with Jesse Frasure, Matt Jenkins, and Jessie Jo Dillon. The song's lyrics list off several other musical inspirations for Jelly Roll, while also mentioning his time having served prison sentences. The album version of the song opens with Jarrod Brown playing the role of a preacher.

According to Jelly Roll, he placed the song first on the album because he felt it had "meaning" and told a story of "being somewhere between right and wrong".

== Charts ==
=== Weekly charts ===
Weekly chart performance
Chart (2024)	Peak position
Australia Country Hot 50 (The Music)	6
Canada Hot 100 (Billboard)	84
Canada Country (Billboard)	1
US Billboard Hot 100	48
US Country Airplay (Billboard)	1
US Hot Country Songs (Billboard)	11
US Hot Rock & Alternative Songs (Billboard)	7

=== Year-end charts ===
Annual chart rankings
Chart (2024)	Position
US Country Airplay (Billboard)	27
US Hot Country Songs (Billboard)	45
US Hot Rock & Alternative Songs (Billboard)	25
US Radio Songs (Billboard)	63
