= Whitsitt Chapel =

Studio album by Jelly Roll
- Released: June 2, 2023
- Genre: Country; country rock
- Length: 43:26
- Label: Bailee & Buddy; BBR
- Producer: Andrew Baylis; Brock Berryhill; Zach Crowell; Jesse Frasure; David Garcia; Kevin Gruft; Austin Nivarel; David Ray Stevens

Jelly Roll chronology
Ballads of the Broken (2021)	Whitsitt Chapel (2023)	Beautifully Broken (2024)

Singles from Whitsitt Chapel
- 1. "Need a Favor" Released: December 9, 2022; 2. "Save Me" Released: May 11, 2023; 3. "Halfway to Hell" Released: January 22, 2024

Whitsitt Chapel is the ninth studio album by American singer-songwriter Jelly Roll, released on June 2, 2023, through Bailee & Buddy and BBR Music Group. It is his first country music album and includes collaborations with Brantley Gilbert, Struggle Jennings, Yelawolf and Lainey Wilson. It was preceded by the singles "Need a Favor" and "Save Me" with Wilson. The songs "She" and "Unlive" were also released prior to the album.

== Background ==
Jelly Roll described the album as "Real music for real people with real problems" and "about growth and gratitude happening in my life", stating that he wanted to "create a project that felt hopeful". He named it after a chapel in Antioch, Tennessee, he formerly attended, which influenced the album and its themes of "sin and redemption".

The songs "She" and "Unlive" with Yelawolf were released prior to the album on November 30, 2022, and April 14, 2023, respectively.

== Critical reception ==
Professional ratings
Review scores
Source	Rating
AllMusic	3.5/5 stars
Entertainment Focus	5/5 stars
Holler Country	6.5/10
Rock 'n' Load Mag	10/10

James Daykin of Entertainment Focus felt that "one listen will be enough to convince you of this artist's unique perspective and original contribution to the genre" of country music, calling it "a raw, honest and powerful listen". Ed Ford of Rock 'n' Load Mag complimented Jelly Roll's "gravelly vocal over smooth instrumentals", opining that listeners "will be captivated by the storytelling" that "will last throughout the entire album". Ford also felt that Whitsitt Chapel "genuinely has everything and most importantly it grips you and doesn't let go", calling it the best "all-round" album he has heard in 2023.

Lesley Janes of The Nash News wrote that Jelly Roll "embodies diverse styles of music but is able to create one of the more cohesive albums of the year. His desire to make a record of songs that sinners can relate to has paid off. Jelly Roll is on to something, and everyone should take notice." Billy Dukes of Taste of Country described it as "an album for the outcast within each of us" without any filler tracks.

== Track listing ==
Whitsitt Chapel track listing
No.	Title	Writer(s)	Producer(s)	Length
1.	"Halfway to Hell"	Jason DeFord; Jesse Frasure; Matt Jenkins; Jessie Jo Dillon	Frasure; Zach Crowell	2:58
2.	"Church"	DeFord; Michael Hardy; David Garcia	Crowell; Garcia	3:40
3.	"The Lost"	DeFord; Frasure; Miranda Lambert	Frasure; Crowell	3:19
4.	"Behind Bars" (with Brantley Gilbert and Struggle Jennings)	DeFord; Brantley Gilbert; Michael Whitworth; Andrew Baylis; Brock Berryhill; Austin Nivarel	Baylis; Berryhill	2:57
5.	"Nail Me"	DeFord; Kevin "Thrasher" Gruft; Nivarel	Crowell	2:41
6.	"Hold on Me"	DeFord; Hillary Lindsey; Alysa Vanderheim; Michael Whitworth	Crowell	3:36
7.	"Kill a Man"	DeFord; Riley Thomas; Baylis; Whitworth	Crowell	3:04
8.	"Unlive" (with Yelawolf)	DeFord; Ashley McBryde; Baylis; Zach Crowell; Michael Wayne Atha	Crowell	3:57
9.	"Save Me" (with Lainey Wilson)	DeFord; David Ray Stevens	Crowell; Stevens	3:57
10.	"She"	DeFord; Nivarel; Gruft	Gruft	2:53
11.	"Need a Favor"	DeFord; Nivarel; Joe Ragosta; Rob Ragosta	Nivarel	3:17
12.	"Dancing with the Devil"	DeFord; Hunter Phelps; Crowell	Crowell	3:37
13.	"Hungover in a Church Pew"	DeFord; Phelps; Crowell	Crowell	3:30
Total length:				43:26

== Personnel ==
Musicians

- Jelly Roll – vocals
- Jarrod Brown – additional vocals (1–3, 5, 13)
- Sol Philcox-Littlefield – bass guitar (1–3, 5, 6, 12, 13), electric guitar (1, 3, 7–9), acoustic guitar (3, 6–9, 12)
- Grady Saxman – drums (1–3, 6, 7, 9, 12, 13), percussion (5)
- Nathan Keeterle – electric guitar (1–7, 9, 12, 13), acoustic guitar (4, 5), slide guitar (4)
- Zach Crowell – keyboards, programming (1–3, 5–8, 12, 13); backing vocals (5)
- Jesse Frasure – programming (1, 3), backing vocals (1)
- David Garcia – acoustic guitar (2)
- Ben Caver – backing vocals (2, 7)
- Andrew Baylis – electric guitar (4, 8), acoustic guitar (8)
- Miranda Lambert – backing vocals (3)
- Brock Berryhill – bass guitar (4)
- Miles McPherson – drums (4)
- Brantley Gilbert – vocals (4)
- Struggle Jennings – vocals (4)
- Devin Malone – acoustic guitar (6, 12), bass guitar (9), electric guitar (12)
- Hillary Lindsey – backing vocals (6)
- Madeline Merlo – backing vocals (7)
- DJ Chill – programming (8)
- Yelawolf – vocals (8)
- David Ray Stevens – acoustic guitar, backing vocals (9)
- Robyn Raynelle – backing vocals (9)
- Stu Stapleton – piano (9)
- Lainey Wilson – vocals (9)
- Kevin "Thrasher" Gruft – backing vocals, bass guitar, guitar, keyboards (10)
- Randall Cooke – drums (10)
- David Mills – steel guitar (10)
- Austin Nivarel – acoustic guitar, background vocals, electric guitar (11)
- Ilya Toshinskiy – acoustic guitar (11)
- Tim Marks – bass guitar (11)
- Shannon Sanders – choir arrangement (11)
- Fisk Jubilee Singers (Note: The Fisk Jubilee Singers consist of vocalists Shannon Sanders, Cristina Rae' Fentress, Eren Brooks, Evan Acklin, Jordan Holland, Kim Fleming, MarQo Patton, Trinity Hervey, Victoria Sanders, and Zoe Frazier.) – choir (11)
- Nir Z – drums (11)
- Derek Wells – electric guitar (11)
- Stuart Duncan – fiddle (11)
- Alex Wright – keyboards (11)
- Justin Schipper – steel guitar (11)
- Hunter Phelps – backing vocals (12, 13)
- Scotty Sanders – Dobro, pedal steel guitar (13)

Technical

- Joe LaPorta – mastering
- Jim Cooley – mixing (1–9, 12, 13)
- Jeff Braun – mixing (10, 11)
- Aidan Thompson – engineering (1–3, 5–9, 12, 13)
- Seth Morton – engineering (11)
- Grady Saxman – recording (1–3, 5–9, 12, 13)
- Andrew Baylis – recording (4)
- Brock Berryhill – recording (4)
- Kevin "Thrasher" Gruft – recording (10)
- Austin Nivarel – recording, editing (11)
- Justin Francis – recording (11)
- Zach Crowell – additional recording (1–3, 5–9, 12, 13)
- Zach Kuhlman – mixing assistance (1–9, 12, 13), recording assistance (11)
- Eric Arjes – mixing assistance (10)
- Steve Cordray – recording assistance (11)

== Charts ==
=== Weekly charts ===
Chart performance for Whitsitt Chapel
Chart (2023)	Peak position
Australian Country Albums (ARIA)	15
Australian Hitseekers Albums (ARIA)	9
Canadian Albums (Billboard)	22
UK Album Downloads (OCC)	48
UK Country Albums (OCC)	4
UK Independent Albums (OCC)	38
US Billboard 200	3
US Independent Albums (Billboard)	1
US Top Country Albums (Billboard)	2
US Top Rock Albums (Billboard)	1

=== Year-end charts ===
2023 year-end chart performance for Whitsitt Chapel
Chart (2023)	Position
US Billboard 200	118
US Independent Albums (Billboard)	18
US Top Country Albums (Billboard)	24
US Top Rock Albums (Billboard)	13

2024 year-end chart performance for Whitsitt Chapel
Chart (2024)	Position
US Billboard 200	60
US Top Country Albums (Billboard)	14

2025 year-end chart performance for Whitsitt Chapel
Chart (2025)	Position
US Top Country Albums (Billboard)	43

== Certifications ==
Region	Certification	Certified units/sales
United States (RIAA)	Platinum	1,000,000^{‡}
^{‡} Sales+streaming figures based on certification alone.
