= Need a Favor =

2022 single by Jelly Roll

Single by Jelly Roll

from the album Whitsitt Chapel
- Released: December 9, 2022
- Genre: Country rock
- Length: 3:17
- Label: BBR
- Songwriters: Jason DeFord; Rob Ragosta; Joe Ragosta; Austin Nivarel
- Producer: Austin Nivarel

Jelly Roll singles chronology
"Dead Man Walking" (2021)	"Need a Favor" (2022)	"Save Me (Remix)" (2023)

Music video
- "Need a Favor" on YouTube

"Need a Favor" is a song by American musician Jelly Roll, released on December 9, 2022, as the lead single from his ninth studio album Whitsitt Chapel (2023). Jelly Roll co-wrote the song with Rob Ragosta, Joe Ragosta and Austin Nivarel, the latter of whom produced it. The song was sent to country radio on February 13, 2023.

== Composition and lyrics ==
"Need a Favor" is a country rock song which centers on a man being on the verge of losing himself and praying for God to do him a favor, but also admitting he does not deserve it and hoping to repent for his past actions. Jelly Roll sings in the chorus, "I only talk to God when I need a favor / And I only pray when I ain't got a prayer / So, who the hell am I, who the hell am I / To expect a Savior o-o-oh / If I only talk to God when I need a favor / But God I need a favor / Amen... Amen".

== Critical reception ==
Lesley Janes of The Nash News wrote, "The combination of rock and country is easy to find on this song. He speaks with raw authenticity that it's impossible not to believe every word he sings. Everyone needs a helping hand at times, and Jelly Roll is able to capture that perfectly on this track. The line, "Who the Hell am I to expect a savior," brings true humility to the forefront." Jess of Taste of Country wrote, "Both sonically and lyrically, the song feels like a prime track for the soundtrack of an upcoming Yellowstone episode."

== Live performances ==
Jelly Roll performed the song at the 2023 CMT Music Awards. He also performed the song with Wynonna Judd at the 57th Annual Country Music Association Awards.

== Accolades ==
Awards and nominations for "Need a Favor"
Organization	Year	Category	Result
People's Choice Country Awards	2023	The Song of 2023	Won
People's Choice Country Awards	2023	The Music Video of 2023	Nominated
Country Music Association Awards	2023	Single of the Year	Nominated
Country Music Association Awards	2023	Music Video of the Year	Nominated
Billboard Music Awards	2023	Top Rock Song	Nominated
IHeartRadio Music Awards	2024	Rock Song of the Year	Nominated
CMT Music Awards	2024	Video of the Year	Won
CMT Music Awards	2024	Male Video of the Year	Won
CMT Music Awards	2024	CMT Performance of the Year	Won
Academy of Country Music Awards	2024	Single of the Year	Nominated

== Charts ==
=== Weekly charts ===
Weekly chart performance for "Need a Favor"
Chart (2023–2024)	Peak position
Australia Hitseekers (ARIA)	19
Canada Hot 100 (Billboard)	36
Canada Country (Billboard)	1
Canada Hot AC (Billboard)	20
Canada Rock (Billboard)	24
Global 200 (Billboard)	139
New Zealand Hot Singles (RMNZ)	17
US Billboard Hot 100	13
US Adult Contemporary (Billboard)	15
US Adult Pop Airplay (Billboard)	4
US Country Airplay (Billboard)	1
US Hot Country Songs (Billboard)	3
US Hot Rock & Alternative Songs (Billboard)	1
US Pop Airplay (Billboard)	14
US Rock & Alternative Airplay (Billboard)	3

=== Year-end charts ===
2023 year-end chart performance for "Need a Favor"
Chart (2023)	Position
Canada (Canadian Hot 100)	81
US Billboard Hot 100	34
US Adult Top 40 (Billboard)	47
US Country Airplay (Billboard)	5
US Hot Country Songs (Billboard)	8
US Hot Rock & Alternative Songs (Billboard)	3
US Rock Airplay (Billboard)	6

2024 year-end chart performance for "Need a Favor"
Chart (2024)	Position
US Billboard Hot 100	64
US Adult Contemporary (Billboard)	39
US Adult Top 40 (Billboard)	22
US Hot Country Songs (Billboard)	26
US Hot Rock & Alternative Songs (Billboard)	11

== Certifications ==
Certifications for "Need a Favor"
Region	Certification	Certified units/sales
Australia (ARIA)	Gold	35,000^{‡}
Canada (Music Canada)	Gold	40,000^{‡}
New Zealand (RMNZ)	Gold	15,000^{‡}
United States (RIAA)	2× Platinum	2,000,000^{‡}
^{‡} Sales+streaming figures based on certification alone.
