= Don't Come Lookin' =

2022 song by Jackson Dean

Single by Jackson Dean

from the album Greenbroke
- Released: February 22, 2022
- Genre: Country
- Length: 3:12
- Label: BMLG
- Songwriters: Jackson Dean; Luke Dick
- Producer: Luke Dick

Jackson Dean singles chronology
"Don't Come Lookin'" (2022)	"Fearless (The Echo)" (2023)

"Don't Come Lookin'" is a song by American country music singer Jackson Dean. The song was first released as part of Dean's self-titled debut EP on April 30, 2021, and serviced to country radio on February 22, 2022, as the lead single from his debut studio album Greenbroke. It has charted on Billboard Hot Country Songs and Country Airplay. Dean wrote the song with Luke Dick, who also produced it.

== Content ==
The song is about the narrator's sense of wanderlust, described by Taste of Country as "freewheeling" and "uptempo". Dean told Songwriter Universe that the song's idea came in a conversation with his mother, and that he presented the idea to Dick during a songwriting session where Dick had a melody but no lyrics. The Paramount Network also featured the song in an episode of the series Yellowstone.

== Charts ==
=== Weekly charts ===
Weekly chart performance for "Don't Come Lookin'"
Chart (2022)	Peak position
Canada (Canadian Hot 100)	72
Canada Country (Billboard)	3
US Billboard Hot 100	50
US Country Airplay (Billboard)	3
US Hot Country Songs (Billboard)	11

=== Year-end charts ===
2022 year-end chart performance for "Don't Come Lookin'"
Chart (2022)	Position
US Country Airplay (Billboard)	15
US Hot Country Songs (Billboard)	48

== Certifications ==
Certifications for "Don't Come Lookin'"
Region	Certification	Certified units/sales
Canada (Music Canada)	Platinum	80,000^{‡}
United States (RIAA)	Platinum	1,000,000^{‡}
^{‡} Sales+streaming figures based on certification alone.
