= Dead Man Walking (Jelly Roll song) =

2021 song by Jelly Roll

Single by Jelly Roll

from the album Ballads of the Broken
- Released: October 26, 2021
- Length: 3:21
- Label: Bailee & Buddy; BBR
- Songwriters: Andrew Baylis; Michael Whitworth; David Ray Stevens; Jason DeFord
- Producers: Baylis; Stevens; Eric Flemming

Jelly Roll singles chronology
"Call It Quits" (2021)	"Dead Man Walking" (2021)	"Son of a Sinner" (2022)

Music video
- "Dead Man Walking" on YouTube

"Dead Man Walking" is a song by American musician Jelly Roll, released on October 26, 2021, as a single from his eighth studio album Ballads of the Broken (2021). The song reached No. 1 on the US Billboard Mainstream Rock Airplay chart in May 2022.

== Background and composition ==
Jessica Nicholson of Billboard reported that "Dead Man Walking", along with "Sober" and "Son of a Sinner", detailed Jelly Roll's internal struggle to find peace and balance after battling addiction. Lauryn Schaffner of Loudwire reported that Jelly Roll said "Dead Man Walking" was about his own struggles with obesity and alcoholism.

At a celebration of the song's chart success, co-writer Michael Whitworth recalled that it had been written at Sound Emporium at 3 a.m. Jelly Roll said that the four songwriters wrote it while "blackout drunk" and on "nefarious drugs".

== Reception ==
Jacob Uitti of American Songwriter described "Dead Man Walking" as a song about pain, suffering, addiction and living with less, noting its electric guitars and the growl in Jelly Roll's voice. Amara Sorosiak of American Songwriter described the song as featuring "booming instrumentals" and said it dealt with addiction and being "just two steps away from throwing it all away".

== Personnel ==
Credits adapted from Apple Music.

Musicians

- Jelly Roll – vocals
- Cole Clark – drums
- Michael Whitworth – additional vocals
- David Ray Stevens – additional vocals

Technical

- Andrew Baylis – production, engineering
- David Ray Stevens – production
- Eric Flemming – production
- Reid Shippen – mixing
- Joe LaPorta – mastering
- Joe Trentacosti – engineering
- Lowell Reynolds – engineering
- Michael Mechling – mixing assistant
- Brandon Towles – mixing assistant

== Chart performance ==
"Dead Man Walking" reached No. 1 on Billboard's Mainstream Rock Airplay chart dated May 14, 2022, giving Jelly Roll his first No. 1 on a Billboard radio ranking and his first entry on the chart. It was the first No. 1 for all four songwriters. The song reached No. 30 on Billboard's Hot Rock & Alternative Songs chart. In a social media post about the song's success, Jelly Roll called the achievement "one of the biggest accomplishments of my entire life and career".

=== Weekly charts ===
Weekly chart performance for "Dead Man Walking"
Chart (2021–2022)	Peak position
Canada Rock (Billboard)	38
US Rock Digital Song Sales (Billboard)	23
US Hot Rock & Alternative Songs (Billboard)	30
US Rock & Alternative Airplay (Billboard)	6
US Mainstream Rock Airplay (Billboard)	1

=== Year-end charts ===
Year-end chart performance for "Dead Man Walking"
Chart (2022)	Position
US Rock & Alternative Airplay (Billboard)	24
US Mainstream Rock Airplay (Billboard)	2
