= Jackson Dean =

American singer and songwriter

- Born: Jackson Dean Nicholson; October 6, 2000 (age 26); Odenton, Maryland, U.S.
- Origin: Nashville, Tennessee, U.S.
- Genre: Country
- Occupation: Singer-songwriter
- Instrument: Vocals
- Years active: 2018–present
- Label: Big Machine Records
- Website: jacksondeanmusic.com

Jackson Dean Nicholson (born October 6, 2000) is an American country music singer and songwriter. He signed to Big Machine Records in 2021 and had the singles "Don't Come Lookin'", "Fearless (The Echo)", and "Heavens to Betsy" chart.

== Background ==
Jackson Dean was born in Odenton, Maryland. He attended Arundel High School, where he played on the football team as a defensive end. In October 2018, when he was a senior, a video of him singing the national anthem before a football game went viral online. After graduating, he moved to Nashville to pursue a music career. He has had songwriting collaborations with Casey Beathard and Luke Dick. After serving as an opening act for Kane Brown, Jake Owen, and Brothers Osborne, he was signed to Big Machine Records in 2021. Dean's first release for Big Machine was a self-titled extended play with the single "Wings"; the EP was released on April 16, 2021.

Dean's debut single, "Don't Come Lookin'", was released in February 2022. Next, his debut album, Greenbroke, came out on March 11, 2022. In addition, he was booked as an opening act for Brooks & Dunn's Reboot 2022 Tour. "Don't Come Lookin'" peaked at No. 3 on the Billboard Country Airplay chart in November. The song featured in an episode of Yellowstone. on Paramount. "Fearless (The Echo)" was released as the second single from Greenbroke in 2023, and it reached No. 11 on the Billboard Country Airplay chart in 2024.

Dean's second studio album, On the Back of My Dreams, was released on September 6, 2024. Its lead single, "Heavens to Betsy", followed in August 2024.

Dean's third studio album, Magnolia Sage, was released on April 24, 2026. Its lead single, "Make a Liar", impacted country radio in January 2026.

== Discography ==
=== Albums ===
Title	Album details
Greenbroke	Release date: March 11, 2022; Label: Big Machine Records
On the Back of My Dreams	Release date: September 6, 2024; Label: Big Machine
Magnolia Sage	Release date: April 24, 2026; Label: Big Machine

=== Extended plays ===
Title	EP details
Jackson Dean	Release date: April 16, 2021; Label: Big Machine

=== Singles ===
Year	Title	Peak chart positions					Certifications	Album
Year	Title	US	US Country Songs	US Country Airplay	CAN	CAN Country	Certifications	Album
2022	"Don't Come Lookin'"	50	11	3	72	3	RIAA: Platinum	Greenbroke
2023	"Fearless (The Echo)"	—	31	11	—	29	RIAA: Gold; MC: Gold	Greenbroke
2024	"Heavens to Betsy"	71	20	2	82	39		On the Back of My Dreams
2026	"Make a Liar"	—	—	38	—	44		Magnolia Sage
2026	"Blacktop Blues"	—	—	56	—	—		Magnolia Sage

== Awards and nominations ==
Year	Organization	Award	Nominee/Work	Result
2023	Academy of Country Music Awards	New Male Artist of the Year	Jackson Dean	Nominated
