= Holy Water (Marshmello and Jelly Roll song) =

2025 single by Marshmello and Jelly Roll

Single by Marshmello and Jelly Roll
- Released: August 8, 2025
- Genre: Country-EDM
- Length: 2:29
- Label: Big Loud; Mercury; Joytime Collective
- Songwriters: Christopher Comstock; Jason DeFord; Ryan Vojtesak; Danny Majic; Justin Franks; Kameron Alexander
- Producers: Marshmello; Charlie Handsome; Majic; DJ Frank E

Marshmello singles chronology
"Bassline Flexa" (2025)	"Holy Water" (2025)	"Better Man Than Me" (2025)

Jelly Roll singles chronology
"Bloodline" (2025)	"Holy Water" (2025)	"Box Me Up" (2025)

"Holy Water" is a song by American DJ Marshmello and American singer Jelly Roll. It was released on August 8, 2025 and produced by Marshmello, Charlie Handsome, Danny Majic and DJ Frank E.

== Background ==
Marshmello said of the song:

It's really heartfelt. This is one of the most emotional songs I've ever released. It's about losing a loved one. Unfortunately, a lot of us can relate to that. When I showed the initial idea to Jelly Roll and told him the story, he loved it. He's an open book, and it was really great to see how it resonated. It inspired me to go in even more on the production and get creative with the country elements. He definitely brought it home to where it is now.

About a week before the song's release, Marshmello posted a picture of him in a private jet holding another version of his signature helmet featuring Jelly Roll's tattoos. He followed that up with a video of him and Jelly Roll dancing to the song in the studio. On August 5, 2025, Marshmello shared a video of him presenting the helmet to Jelly Roll and both of them wearing their helmets.

A music video was released through Marshmello's YouTube channel on October 13, 2025.

== Composition ==
"Holy Water" is a country-EDM song. The instrumental is primarily backed by piano and kinetic synths, also incorporating twelve-string guitar, baritone guitar, and mandolin. Lyrically, the song finds Jelly Roll paying homage to his departed loved ones with spiritual imagery. He centers on holy water, depicting himself as toasting it, and his tears. In addition, Jelly Roll reflects on joyful memories of the people he mourns while expressing anger and frustration that they had died young.

== Critical reception ==
Original Rock commented that "Jelly Roll sounds right at home against this striking and soulful backdrop" and the song "tugs heartstrings and hits as hard as anything either of these icons has done…" Maxim Mower of Holler wrote the song "captures the soul-stirring, bittersweet ambience that Jelly Roll has become synonymous with in recent years" and "Marshmello showcases his compositional prowess and introduces a more galvanising, beat-driven instrumental." He overall described it as "Marshmello's soaring, uplifting hooks and club-ready breakdowns combining powerfully with Jelly Roll's emotional vulnerability and striking delivery."

== Charts ==
=== Weekly charts ===
Weekly chart performance for "Holy Water"
Chart (2025–2026)	Peak position
Belgium (Ultratop 50 Flanders)	15
Canada Hot 100 (Billboard)	77
Canada Hot AC (Billboard)	37
Croatia International Airplay (Top lista)	65
Czech Republic Airplay (ČNS IFPI)	12
Latvia Airplay (LaIPA)	12
Netherlands (Dutch Top 40)	14
Netherlands (Single Tip)	22
Netherlands Airplay (Radiomonitor)	33
US Billboard Hot 100	79
US Adult Pop Airplay (Billboard)	17
US Hot Country Songs (Billboard)	22
US Pop Airplay (Billboard)	32

=== Year-end charts ===
Year-end chart performance for "Holy Water"
Chart (2025)	Position
Belgium (Ultratop 50 Flanders)	163
Netherlands (Dutch Top 40)	66

== Release history ==
Release history for "Holy Water"
Region	Date	Format(s)	Label(s)	Ref.
Various	August 8, 2025	Digital download; streaming	Big Loud; Mercury; Joytime Collective	
United States	August 12, 2025	Contemporary hit radio	Big Loud; Mercury; Republic	
