= A Beautiful Disaster =

Studio album by JellyRoll
- Released: March 13, 2020
- Genre: Hip hop
- Length: 40:01
- Labels: War Dog; Strange
- Producers: Casey Jarvis; Christopher Fulton; David Ray; Eric Flemming; ScatteredBrains; Seven; Still Matthews

JellyRoll chronology
Whiskey Sessions II (2019)	A Beautiful Disaster (2020)	Self Medicated (2020)

Professional ratings
Review scores
Source	Rating
AllMusic	3/5 stars

A Beautiful Disaster is the sixth solo studio album by American rapper JellyRoll. It was released on March 13, 2020 through Strange Music and It Goes Up. It features guest appearances from Krizz Kaliko, Lil Wyte, Struggle Jennings and Tech N9ne among others. The album debuted at number 97 on the US Billboard 200 in the United States.

Four music videos were released for the songs "Creature" with Tech N9ne and Krizz Kaliko, "I Need You", "Nothing Left at All" and "Tears Could Talk" with Bailee Ann.

== Track listing ==
A Beautiful Disaster track listing
No.	Title	Writer(s)	Length
1.	"The Bottom"	Jason DeFord; Jack R. Fowler; Matthew Wallace; Stuart Stapleton	2:37
2.	"I Need You"	J. DeFord; Fowler; Wallace; Stapleton	2:52
3.	"Nothing Left at All"	J. DeFord; David R. Stevens	3:24
4.	"Suicide"	J. DeFord; Casey Jarvis; Christopher Fulton; Michael Summers	3:43
5.	"Bottle and Mary Jane"	J. DeFord; Wallace; Stapleton	2:52
6.	"Creature" (featuring Tech N9ne and Krizz Kaliko)	J. DeFord; Aaron D. Yates; Samuel Watson; Jarvis; Fulton; Summers	4:00
7.	"Tears Could Talk" (featuring Bailee Ann)	J. DeFord; Bailee Ann DeFord; Vaughn Freitag	3:35
8.	"Staring at a Stranger" (featuring Struggle Jennings)	J. DeFord; William Harness; Freitag	2:48
9.	"Love Me" (featuring Brianna Harness)	J. DeFord; W. Harness; Brianna Harness; Freitag	3:36
10.	"Jesus and Rock and Roll" (featuring Lil Wyte)	J. DeFord; Patrick Lanshaw; Stevens; Fowler; Wallace	3:34
11.	"Life" (featuring Brix)	J. DeFord; Jerrico R. Moore; Robert Glover; Wallace; Stapleton	4:14
12.	"Pill Talking"	J. DeFord; Jarvis; Fulton; Summers	2:46
Total length:			40:01

== Charts ==
Chart performance for A Beautiful Disaster
Chart (2020)	Peak position
US Billboard 200	97
US Independent Albums (Billboard)	9

== Certifications ==
Region	Certification	Certified units/sales
United States (RIAA)	Gold	500,000^{‡}
^{‡} Sales+streaming figures based on certification alone.
