= Walker McGuire =

American country music duo

- Origin: Nashville, Tennessee, U.S.
- Genres: Country
- Years active: 2012–2019
- Label: Wheelhouse
- Past members: Jordan Walker; Johnny McGuire

Walker McGuire was an American country music duo. Formed in Nashville, Tennessee in 2012, the duo consisted of Jordan Walker and Johnny McGuire, both of whom were singers and songwriters. They released one single for BBR Music Group's Wheelhouse division before disbanding in 2019.

== Biography ==
Jordan Walker was born and raised in Vernon, Texas. He performed locally at various honky-tonks before deciding to move to Nashville, Tennessee to pursue a country music career. There, he met Fairway, Kansas native Johnny McGuire at a songwriters' gathering. The two then began recording songs together, which led to them being discovered by representatives of the syndicated country music radio show Big D and Bubba.

The duo signed to BBR Music Group's Wheelhouse label in 2017 and released their debut single "Til Tomorrow" that same year. "Til Tomorrow" reached top 40 on the Billboard Country Airplay charts upon its release. The song was included on a self-titled extended play also released in 2017. Cillea Houghton of Sounds Like Nashville wrote in her review that " The duo continue on the path modern country music has laid out, sticking to tried and true topics throughout the EP that makes for universal appeal. While incorporating the modern country sound into their music, they also add in a hint of traditionalism". "Mama's Kitchen Table" was also released as a single from the EP in 2018. Walker also co-wrote Luke Combs's 2017 single "When It Rains It Pours".

In February 2019, the country music website Taste of Country reported that Walker McGuire had disbanded and deleted their social media accounts. At the time of this announcement, McGuire stated that he planned to begin a solo career.

== Discography ==
=== Extended plays ===
Title	Album details	Peak chart positions
Title	Album details	US Indie
Walker McGuire	Release date: January 12, 2017; Label: Wheelhouse	23

=== Singles ===
List of singles, with selected chart positions
Title	Year	Peak positions		Album
Title	Year	US Country	US Country Airplay	Album
"Til Tomorrow"	2017	50	35	Walker McGuire
"Mama's Kitchen Table"	2018	—	—	Walker McGuire
