= Save Me (Jelly Roll song) =

2020 single by Jelly Roll

- Solo version cover

Single by Jelly Roll featuring Lainey Wilson

from the album Self Medicated and Whitsitt Chapel
- Released: June 25, 2020 (original); May 12, 2023 (remix)
- Recorded: June 3, 2020 (original); January 30, 2023 (remix)
- Studio: Sound Emporium (Nashville)
- Genre: Country
- Length: 4:00 (original); 3:57 (remix)
- Label: War Dog; BBR
- Songwriters: Jason DeFord; David Ray; Grant Sims
- Producer: David Ray

Jelly Roll singles chronology
"They Say" (2019)	"Save Me" (2020)	"Promise" (2020)

Lainey Wilson singles chronology
"Wait in the Truck" (2022)	"Save Me" (2023)	"Watermelon Moonshine" (2023)

Music video
- "Save Me" on YouTube

"Save Me" is a song by American musician Jelly Roll, released on June 25, 2020, as a single from his seventh studio album Self Medicated (2020). An official remix of the song with American country music singer Lainey Wilson was released on May 12, 2023, as the second single from his ninth studio album Whitsitt Chapel (2023).

The song was sampled on "Somebody Save Me", the third single from Eminem's 2024 album The Death of Slim Shady (Coup de Grâce).

== Background ==
The music video of the song premiered on June 16, 2020. In the description, Jelly Roll stated, "This one is a little bit of a curveball for me. I don't usually do these stripped down acoustic videos, but writing this song made me feel something and I felt y'all needed some insight into the more vulnerable side of the music business."

In regard to his inspiration for writing the song, Jelly Roll told Apple Music:

It was the middle of the pandemic. And when I say middle of it, I mean we were spraying boxes with Lysol. And I just couldn't sit through that. I was like, "We got to work." And I was in such a dark space because of that; I knew I needed to write. My father had just died a year before. So I'm still learning how to grieve through that. And then I'm like, "We got to write. I got to get this out of me." So "Save Me" came from a really dark space. It's still really hard to sing.

In a June 2024 interview with Howard Stern, Jelly Roll further revealed that inspiration for the song came from Bette Midler's song "The Rose".

== Live performances ==
Jelly Roll and Lainey Wilson performed the song at the 58th Academy of Country Music Awards and later at the finale of season 21 of American Idol.

== Credits and personnel ==
Original version

- Jelly Roll — vocals
- David Ray — acoustic guitar
- Stu Stapleton — piano

Remix version

- Jelly Roll — vocals
- Lainey Wilson — vocals
- David Ray — backing vocals, acoustic guitar, electric guitar
- Robyn Raynelle — backing vocals
- Sol Philcox-Littlefield — acoustic guitar, electric guitar
- Nathan Keeterle — electric guitar
- Stu Stapleton — piano
- Devin Malone — bass guitar
- Grady Saxman — drums

== Charts ==
=== Weekly charts ===
Weekly chart performance
Chart (2023–2024)	Peak position
Canada Hot 100 (Billboard)	38
Canada Country (Billboard)	1
US Billboard Hot 100	19
US Digital Song Sales (Billboard) Original version (without Lainey Wilson)	29
US Adult Pop Airplay (Billboard)	9
US Country Airplay (Billboard)	1
US Hot Country Songs (Billboard)	6
US Pop Airplay (Billboard)	18

=== Year-end charts ===
Annual chart rankings
Chart (2023)	Position
US Digital Song Sales (Billboard)	23
US Hot Country Songs (Billboard)	41

Chart (2024)	Position
US Billboard Hot 100	65
US Adult Top 40 (Billboard)	31
US Country Airplay (Billboard)	5
US Hot Country Songs (Billboard)	33

== Certifications ==
Certifications for "Save Me"
Region	Certification	Certified units/sales
Australia (ARIA)	Gold	35,000^{‡}
New Zealand (RMNZ)	Platinum	30,000^{‡}
United States (RIAA)	3× Platinum	3,000,000^{‡}
^{‡} Sales+streaming figures based on certification alone.
