= Jelly Roll (singer) =

American rapper and singer (born 1984)

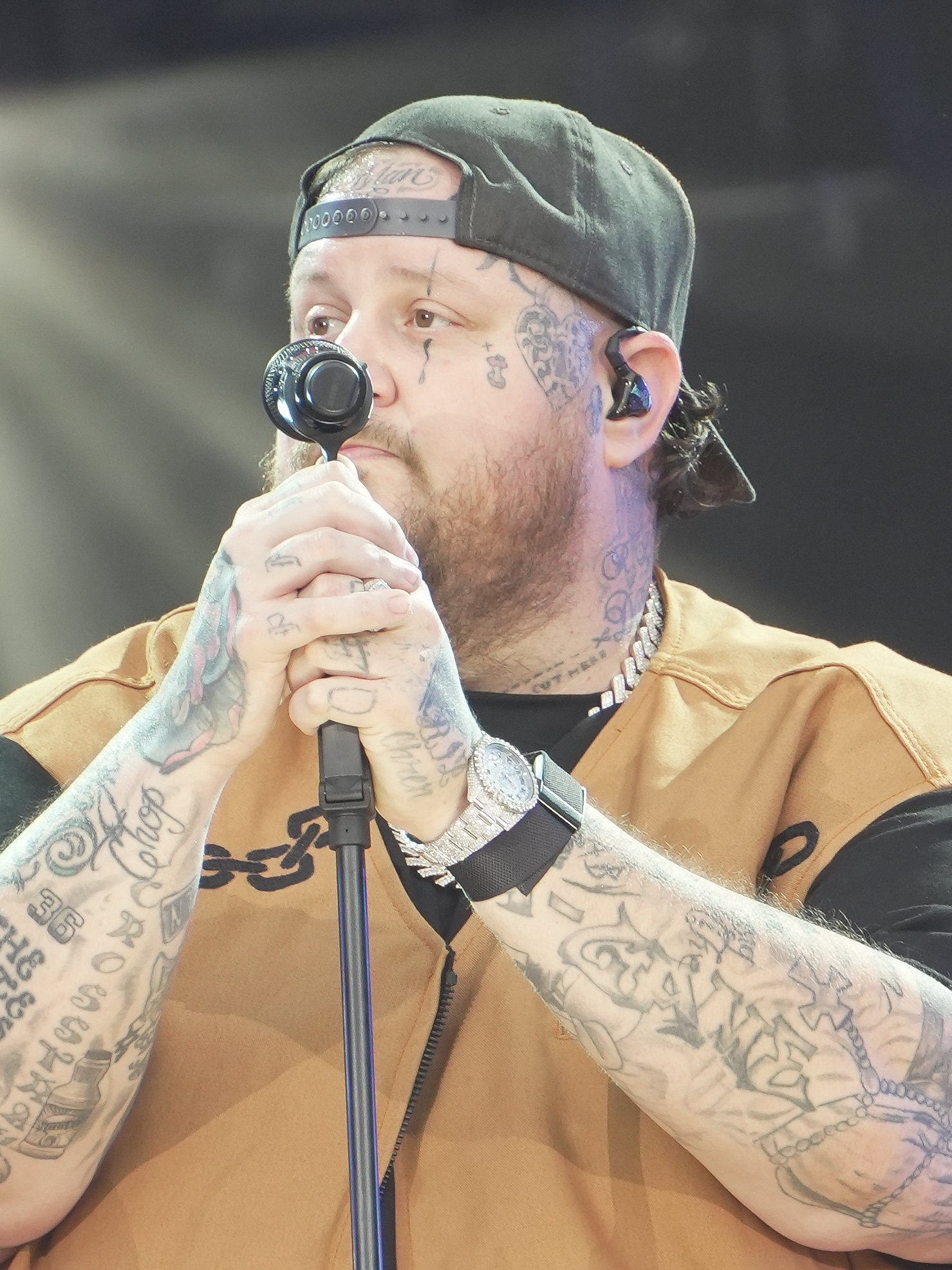
- Jelly Roll performing in 2024
- Born: Jason Bradley DeFord; December 4, 1984 (age 41); Nashville, Tennessee, U.S.
- Other name: JellyRoll
- Occupations: Rapper; singer; songwriter
- Years active: 2003–present
- Notable work: Discography
- Spouse: Alisa DeFord (m. 2016; div. 2026)
- Children: 2
- Musical career
- Genres: Southern hip-hop; country; country rock; hip-hop
- Instruments: Vocals; guitar
- Works: Discography
- Labels: Slumerican; Bad Apple Inc.; War Dog; Wyte Music; BBR
- Website: jellyroll615.com

Jason Bradley DeFord (born December 4, 1984), known professionally as Jelly Roll (originally stylized as JellyRoll), is an American rapper, singer, and songwriter. He began his music career in 2003, and in 2022 rose to mainstream prominence following the release of his singles "Son of a Sinner" and "Need a Favor".

"Son of a Sinner" won three CMT Music Awards in 2023. That same year, he won the award for New Artist at the CMA Awards, and was also nominated for the Best New Artist award at the 66th Annual Grammy Awards. At the 2026 Grammys, he won three awards for Best Country Duo/Group Performance with Shaboozey, Best Contemporary Christian Music Performance/Song with Brandon Lake and Best Contemporary Country Album for his tenth studio album, Beautifully Broken.

== Early life ==
DeFord was born and raised in the Antioch neighborhood of Nashville, Tennessee. His father was a meat salesman and worked as a bookie on the side; his mother suffered from mental illness and addiction. When he was young, his mother nicknamed him Jelly Roll for his fondness for doughnuts. A school friend began calling him that as well, and it became the name he was known by.

DeFord was baptized at age 14, but says around that time he began "dabbling" in drugs and stopped going to church. "The same year that I got baptized, I got arrested, and that started what would be a 10-year cycle of incarceration in and out", he said. From his teenage years into his twenties, DeFord was arrested several times and spent time in jail for various charges and felonies including possession with intent to distribute and aggravated robbery. While imprisoned, he earned his GED at the age of 23. He received a pardon for his previous convictions from Tennessee Governor Bill Lee on December 18, 2025.

== Career ==
=== Music ===
Jelly Roll launched his career in hip-hop after being inspired by rappers such as Three 6 Mafia, UGK, and 8Ball & MJG. He sold mixtapes out of his car, starting with a string of releases from his first project, The Plain Shmear Tape, in 2003, then following with the four-part Gamblin' on the White Boy series from 2004 to 2011. His 2010 collaboration "Pop Another Pill" with Memphis rapper Lil Wyte reached over 6.3 million YouTube views. This song led to the album Year Round by the hip-hop group SNO, of which Jelly Roll was a member. In 2012, Jelly Roll performed at the Gathering of the Juggalos at the Hogrock Ranch & Campground in Cave-In-Rock, Illinois organized by Insane Clown Posse's Psychopathic Records. Over the next few years, Jelly Roll released many mixtapes and independent solo albums including collaborations with Lil Wyte, Struggle Jennings, Haystak, and Tech N9ne. Jelly Roll's 2013 mixtape Whiskey, Weed, & Women was originally named Whiskey, Weed, & Waffle House, but was later changed after Waffle House threatened legal action over the use of their name and logo on the cover. The replacement cover featured a "cease and desist" stamp in place of the restaurant's logo.

Jelly Roll made his Grand Ole Opry debut on November 9, 2021. On July 7, 2022, he was invited by fellow country singer Craig Morgan to join him on stage at the Opry to perform "Almost Home". On May 9, 2022, Jelly Roll scored his first number one on rock radio with the track "Dead Man Walking". In January 2023, Jelly Roll scored his first number-one song on country radio with his debut country single "Son of a Sinner", written by himself, Ernest, and David Ray Stevens. The track was the second single from his eighth studio album, Ballads of the Broken, and also peaked at number 8 on the Billboard Hot Rock & Alternative Songs chart. In February 2023, he made history with a record-breaking 25th week at number one on Billboard's Emerging Artists chart. Jelly Roll sold out Nashville's Bridgestone Arena on December 9, 2022, to 15,000 fans and was joined by Chris Young, Sam Hunt, Riley Green, Shinedown, Ernest, Struggle Jennings, Tech N9ne, and Krizz Kaliko. In the summer of 2023, he completed a 44-city 'Backroad Baptism Tour'. At the 2023 CMT Music Awards, Jelly Roll won for Male Video of the Year, Male Breakthrough Video of the Year, and Digital-First Performance of the Year, all for the song "Son of a Sinner". Jelly Roll released his ninth studio album, Whitsitt Chapel, featuring the single "Need a Favor" on June 2, 2023. In November 2023, Jelly Roll won the award for New Artist of the Year at the 57th Annual Country Music Association Awards. In January 2024, Jelly Roll testified before the U.S. Congress in support of anti-fentanyl legislation. Explaining his perspective as a former distributor of illegal drugs, Jelly Roll stated before the U.S. Senate Banking, Housing, and Urban Affairs Committee, "I was a part of the problem. I am here now, standing as a man that wants to be a part of the solution".

In April 2024, Jelly Roll was sued by Pennsylvania-based wedding band Jellyroll for trademark infringement. The case was later settled out of court. In June 2024, he appeared in the country music documentary Rebel Country. The film opens with a reenactment of his arrest in Tennessee. In July 2024, Jelly Roll was featured on Eminem's twelfth album, The Death of Slim Shady (Coup de Grâce), on the track "Somebody Save Me", which sampled his song "Save Me". He appeared in the music video released the following month. On July 8, Jelly Roll made his first international appearance at the Meridian Centre in St. Catharines, Ontario. On August 23, 2024, Jelly Roll announced his tenth studio album, Beautifully Broken. It was released on October 11, 2024.

In September 2024, Jelly Roll was the first musical guest of the 50th season of Saturday Night Live performing "Liar" and "Winning Streak". Jelly Roll also appeared on SNL50: The Homecoming Concert backed by The Roots, performing a Johnny Cash medley consisting of "I Walk the Line", "Folsom Prison Blues", and "Ring of Fire" and joining Snoop Dogg for "Last Dance with Mary Jane".

In November 2024, Jelly Roll released the song "Run It", from the soundtrack of the film Sonic the Hedgehog 3. On December 3, 2024, a music video for the song was released, featuring clips from the film and original footage in the style of its end credits sequence.

He collaborated with Brandon Lake on a version of Lake's single "Hard Fought Hallelujah", which was released in 2025. This version won the "Song of the Year" award at the 2025 K-Love Fan Awards, which is voted on by fans of Christian music.

Jelly Roll is featured on the song "Amen" by American musician Shaboozey, released on April 25, 2025. The track is included on the complete edition of Shaboozey's third studio album, Where I've Been, Isn't Where I'm Going.

On August 8, 2025, he released the single "Holy Water" with Marshmello.

On March 20, 2026, Jelly Roll, in collaboration with Mexican artist Carín León, released the song "Lighter", the first single from the official album of the 2026 FIFA World Cup. The track was produced by Canadian record producer Cirkut, bringing together an individual from each of the three host countries of the tournament.

=== Acting ===
Jelly Roll made his television debut on the television drama series Tulsa King with Sylvester Stallone. The episode was released in September 2024 and featured Jelly Roll performing a rendition of "I Am Not Okay". He also appeared in Fire Country as Noah, a nursing home worker who gives Vince Leone positive advice. His song "Dreams Don't Die" was used as background for the episode. Jelly Roll voice acted for the character, Grizz, in the animated sports film Goat as well as singing its song I'm Good.

=== Professional wrestling ===
Jelly Roll started making appearances for the American professional wrestling promotion WWE with a performance at SummerSlam 2024, after which he delivered a chokeslam and a chair shot to both Austin Theory and Grayson Waller. On July 11, 2025, Jelly Roll performed on WWE SmackDown where he was interrupted by Logan Paul, setting up a rivalry with Paul and Drew McIntyre and an alliance with Randy Orton. Jelly Roll appeared at Saturday Night's Main Event XL the next night, aiding Orton in his match against McIntyre and attempting to fend off Paul, establishing himself as a babyface. It was subsequently announced that Jelly Roll would compete in a tag team match with Orton against McIntyre and Paul at that year's SummerSlam. On Night 1 of the event on August 2, Jelly Roll and Orton lost to McIntyre and Paul. On August 31, Jelly Roll was seen as a spectator for Clash in Paris.

On the March 28, 2026 episode of SmackDown, Jelly Roll picked up his first victory in professional wrestling, defeating Kit Wilson. Later in the show, Jelly Roll appeared to attempt to break up a brawl between Cody Rhodes and Randy Orton, only to receive an RKO from Orton. At WrestleMania 42 on April 18, Jelly Roll made an appearance and delivered an elbow drop to Pat McAfee through the broadcast table to prevent him from interfering in the Undisputed WWE Championship match between Rhodes and Orton.

== Personal life ==
DeFord married Alisa DeFord, known as "Bunnie Xo", in 2016, and the couple renewed their wedding vows in 2023. They met while he was performing in Las Vegas. He has two children from previous relationships: a daughter, over whom he and Alisa have had full custody, and a son. DeFord filed for divorce from Alisa in Williamson County, Tennessee, on May 18, 2026. On July 17, 2026, it was reported that the divorce had been finalized earlier that month.

DeFord is a fan of professional wrestling. On the second season of WWE Unreal, it was revealed that DeFord bought two houses in Orlando, Florida, so he could train in professional wrestling at WWE Performance Center properly while continuing to lose weight before his return for SummerSlam 2025.

=== Religion ===
DeFord returned to his Christian faith when he was 39 and his daughter, who was 14 at the time, expressed an interest in being baptized. "I should go see what kind of cult she's going to", he recalled thinking, "because that's kind of how I looked at church at that time. And then I went, and I was reminded of the genuineness that can be in those walls, too. I was reminded of the humanity and the compassion and the forgiveness, the love and the community, more than anything watching her and all of her friends there". In 2025, he said, "I might wear it a little different than other people, I might say things that other Christians don't think are right to say, but ultimately, I have a heart for God and I have a heart for Jesus".

=== Politics ===
External videos
- "Senate Hearing on the Fentanyl Crisis", January 11, 2024, C-SPAN

In 2024, DeFord testified before the United States Senate Committee on Banking, Housing, and Urban Affairs in support of Sen. Tim Scott's (R-SC) Fentanyl Eradication and Narcotics Deterrence (FEND) Off Fentanyl Act. "I was a part of the problem. I am here now, standing as a man that wants to be a part of the solution ... I brought my community down. I hurt people. I was the uneducated man in the kitchen playing chemist with drugs I knew absolutely nothing about, just like these drug dealers are doing right now when they're mixing every drug on the market with fentanyl and they're killing the people we love", he said.

At the 2026 Grammy Awards, when asked about his political stance he refused to answer. In August 2026, during an appearance on The Jimmy Kimmel Show, he said, "I lean left on some things, but like most folks I’m pretty down the middle. I am a Christian. I am a country music singer. I’m a farmer. I’m a bow hunter. And most of things I eat I prefer to get with a stick and a string. That’s the truth."

== Discography ==
Studio albums

- The Big Sal Story (2012)
- Sobriety Sucks (2016)
- Addiction Kills (2017)
- Goodnight Nashville (2018)
- Whiskey Sessions II (2019)
- A Beautiful Disaster (2020)
- Self Medicated (2020)
- Ballads of the Broken (2021)
- Whitsitt Chapel (2023)
- Beautifully Broken (2024)

Collaborative albums

- Year Round (with Lil Wyte and BPZ) (2011)
- Strictly Business (with Haystak) (2011)
- No Filter (with Lil Wyte) (2013)
- Business as Usual (with Haystak) (2013)
- No Filter 2 (with Lil Wyte) (2016)
- Waylon & Willie (with Struggle Jennings) (2017)
- Waylon & Willie II (with Struggle Jennings) (2018)
- Waylon & Willie III (with Struggle Jennings) (2018)
- Waylon & Willie IV (with Struggle Jennings) (2020)

== Awards and nominations ==
Year	Award	Category	Work	Result	Ref.
2023	Country Music Association Awards	Male Vocalist of the Year	Himself	Nominated	
2023	Country Music Association Awards	New Artist of the Year	Himself	Won	
2023	Country Music Association Awards	Single of the Year	"Need a Favor"	Nominated	
2023	Country Music Association Awards	Music Video of the Year	"Need a Favor"	Nominated	
2023	Country Music Association Awards	Musical Event of the Year	"Save Me" (with Lainey Wilson)	Nominated	
2023	CMT Music Awards	Male Video of the Year	"Son of a Sinner"	Won	
2023	CMT Music Awards	Male Breakthrough Video of the Year	"Son of a Sinner"	Won	
2023	CMT Music Awards	CMT Digital-First Performance of the Year	"Son of a Sinner"	Won	
2024	Grammy Awards	Best New Artist	Himself	Nominated	
2024	Grammy Awards	Best Country Duo/Group Performance	"Save Me" (with Lainey Wilson)	Nominated	
2024	iHeartRadio Music Awards	Artist of the Year	Himself	Nominated	
2024	iHeartRadio Music Awards	Best New Pop Artist	Himself	Won	
2024	iHeartRadio Music Awards	Best Alternative Rock Artist	Himself	Nominated	
2024	iHeartRadio Music Awards	Best New Alternative Rock Artist	Himself	Nominated	
2024	iHeartRadio Music Awards	Country Artist of the Year	Himself	Nominated	
2024	iHeartRadio Music Awards	Best New Country Artist	Himself	Won	
2024	iHeartRadio Music Awards	Rock Song of the Year	"Need a Favor"	Nominated	
2024	iHeartRadio Music Awards	Favorite On Screen (Socially Voted)	"Save Me"	Nominated	
2024	People's Choice Awards	The Male Country Artist of the Year	Himself	Won	
2024	People's Choice Awards	The New Artist of the Year	Himself	Nominated	
2024	People's Choice Country Awards	The People's Artist of 2024	Himself	Nominated	
2024	People's Choice Country Awards	The Male Artist of 2024	Himself	Nominated	
2024	People's Choice Country Awards	The Social Country Star of 2024	Himself	Nominated	
2024	People's Choice Country Awards	The Song of 2024	"Wild Ones" (with Jessie Murph)	Nominated	
2024	People's Choice Country Awards	The Collaboration Song of 2024	"Chevrolet" (with Dustin Lynch)	Nominated	
2024	People's Choice Country Awards	The Crossover Song of 2024	"Lonely Road" (with Machine Gun Kelly)	Won	
2024	People's Choice Country Awards	The Music Video of 2024	"Lonely Road" (with Machine Gun Kelly)	Nominated	
2024	MTV Video Music Awards	Best Collaboration	"Wild Ones" (with Jessie Murph)	Nominated	
2024	MTV Video Music Awards	Video for Good	"Best for Me" (with Joyner Lucas)	Nominated	
2025	Grammy Awards	Best Country Solo Performance	"I Am Not Okay"	Nominated	
2025	Grammy Awards	Best Country Song	"I Am Not Okay"	Nominated	
2025	K-Love Fan Awards	Song of the Year	"Hard Fought Hallelujah"	Won	
2025	GMA Dove Awards	Song of the Year	"Hard Fought Hallelujah"	Won	
2025	GMA Dove Awards	Short Form Music Video of the Year	"Hard Fought Hallelujah"	Won	
2025	GMA Dove Awards	Bluegrass/Country/Roots Recorded Song of the Year	"Hard Fought Hallelujah"	Won	
2025	MTV Video Music Awards	Best Country Video	"Liar"	Nominated	
2025	MTV Video Music Awards	Best Hip Hop Video	"Somebody Save Me" (with Eminem)	Nominated	
2025	MTV Video Music Awards	Video for Good	"Somebody Save Me" (with Eminem)	Nominated	
2025	CMA Awards	Musical Event of the Year	"Hard Fought Hallelujah"	Nominated	
2025	We Love Awards	Song of the Year	"Hard Fought Hallelujah"	Nominated	
2025	We Love Awards	Contemporary Song of the Year	"Hard Fought Hallelujah"	Nominated	
2025	We Love Awards	Mainstream Impact Award	"Hard Fought Hallelujah"	Won	
2025	We Love Awards	Mainstream Impact Award	"Bloodline"	Nominated	
2026	Grammy Awards	Best Contemporary Country Album	Beautifully Broken	Won	
2026	Grammy Awards	Best Country Duo/Group Performance	"Amen" (with Shaboozey)	Won	
2026	Grammy Awards	Best Contemporary Christian Music Performance/Song	"Hard Fought Hallelujah" (with Brandon Lake)	Won	
