= Kane Brown discography =

American singer and songwriter discography

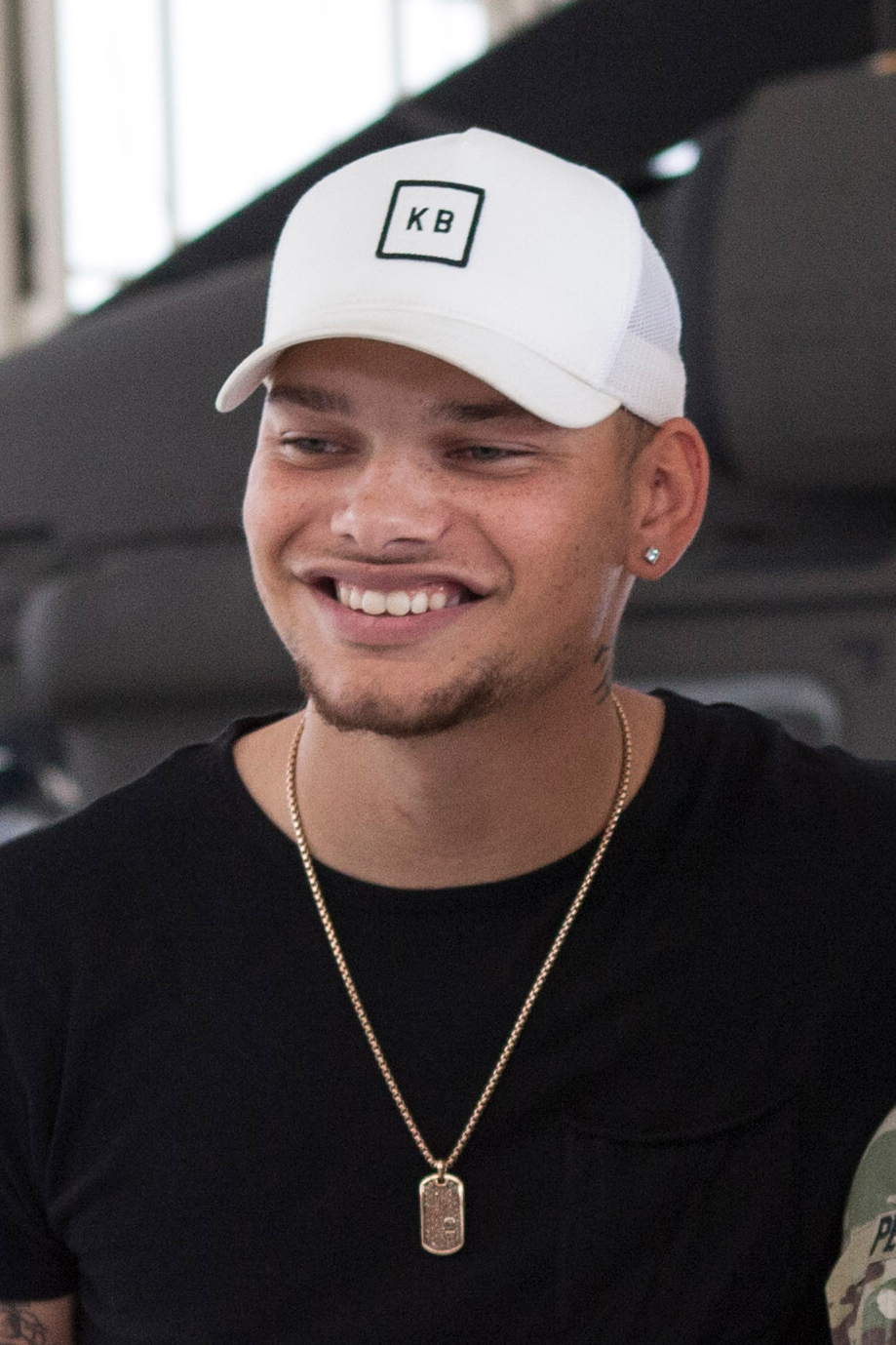
- Brown at Joint Forces Training Base in 2018
- Studio albums: 4
- EPs: 3
- Singles: 25
- Music videos: 23

American singer Kane Brown has released four studio albums, three extended plays, 25 singles, and 23 music videos.

== Studio albums ==
| Title | Album details | Peak chart positions | | | | Certifications |
| Title | Album details | US | US Country | AUS | CAN | Certifications |
|---|---|---|---|---|---|---|
| Kane Brown | Release date: December 2, 2016; Label: RCA Nashville; Formats: CD, digital download | 5 | 1 | 60 | 25 | RIAA: 3× Platinum; MC: 2× Platinum |
| Experiment | Release date: November 9, 2018; Label: RCA Nashville; Formats: CD, digital download, streaming | 1 | 1 | 33 | 17 | RIAA: Platinum; MC: Platinum |
| Different Man | Released: September 9, 2022; Label: RCA Nashville; Formats: CD, digital download, streaming | 5 | 2 | 17 | 6 | RIAA: Platinum; MC: Platinum |
| The High Road | Released: January 24, 2025; Label: RCA Nashville; Formats: CD, digital download, streaming | 7 | 2 | 41 | 18 | |

== Extended plays ==
| Title | Album details | Peak chart positions | | |
| Title | Album details | US | US Country | CAN |
|---|---|---|---|---|
| Closer | Release date: June 2, 2015; Label: Kane Brown; Formats: CD, digital download | 40 | 7 | — |
| Chapter 1 | Release date: March 18, 2016; Label: RCA Nashville; Formats: CD, digital download | 9 | 3 | 28 |
| Mixtape, Vol. 1 | Released: August 14, 2020; Label: RCA Nashville; Formats: Digital download, streaming | 15 | 2 | 16 |
"—" denotes releases that did not chart

== Singles ==
=== As lead artist ===
| Title | Year | Peak chart positions | | | | | | | | | | Certifications | Album |
| Title | Year | US | US Country | US Country Airplay | AUS | CAN | GER | IRE | NZ Hot | SWE | UK | Certifications | Album |
|---|---|---|---|---|---|---|---|---|---|---|---|---|---|
| "Used to Love You Sober" | 2015 | 82 | 15 | 35 | — | — (Note: "Used to Love You Sober" did not enter the Canadian Hot 100, but peaked at number 41 on the Hot Canadian Digital Song Sales chart.) | — | — | — | — | — | RIAA: 2× Platinum; MC: Platinum | Chapter 1 |
| "Thunder in the Rain" | 2016 | — (Note: "Thunder in the Rain" did not enter the Billboard Hot 100, but peaked at number 22 on the Bubbling Under Hot 100 chart.) | 30 | 43 | — | — (Note: "Thunder in the Rain" did not enter the Canadian Hot 100, but peaked at number 46 on the Hot Canadian Digital Song Sales chart.) | — | — | — | — | — | RIAA: Platinum; MC: Gold | Kane Brown |
| "What Ifs" (featuring Lauren Alaina) | 2017 | 26 | 1 | 1 | — | 45 | — | — | — | — | — | RIAA: Diamond; ARIA: 2× Platinum; MC: 6× Platinum; RMNZ: Platinum | Kane Brown |
| "Heaven" | 2017 | 15 | 2 | 1 | — | 33 | — | — | — | — | — | RIAA: 11× Platinum; ARIA: 3× Platinum; BPI: Silver; MC: 8× Platinum; RMNZ: Platinum | Kane Brown |
| "Lose It" | 2018 | 28 | 1 | 1 | — | 58 | — | — | — | — | — | RIAA: 3× Platinum; ARIA: Gold; MC: 2× Platinum | Experiment |
| "Good as You" | 2019 | 36 | 3 | 1 | — | 62 | — | — | — | — | — | RIAA: 4× Platinum; ARIA: Gold; MC: 3× Platinum | Experiment |
| "Saturday Nights" (Remix) (with Khalid) | 2019 | 57 | — | — | — | 31 | — | — | — | — | — | RIAA: 4× Platinum; ARIA: 2× Platinum; BPI: Gold; MC: 6× Platinum; RMNZ: 4× Platinum | Suncity and Free Spirit |
| "One Thing Right" (with Marshmello) | 2019 | 36 | 1 | — | 4 | 12 | 71 | 37 | 9 | 92 | 76 | RIAA: 5× Platinum; ARIA: 6× Platinum; BPI: Silver; MC: 9× Platinum; RMNZ: 2× Platinum | Non-album single |
| "Homesick" | 2019 | 35 | 3 | 1 | — | 78 | — | — | — | — | — | RIAA: 3× Platinum; ARIA: Gold; MC: 2× Platinum | Experiment |
| "Cool Again" (solo or featuring Nelly) | 2020 | 29 | 5 | 3 | — | 54 | — | — | 36 | — | — | RIAA: Platinum; MC: Platinum | Mixtape, Vol. 1 |
| "Worldwide Beautiful" (Note: "Worldwide Beautiful" never received an impact date and was not properly promoted to radio; however, it was shipped to American Country radio in addition to Canadian Country, Pop, AC, and Top 40 radio formats.) | 2020 | 100 | 28 | 33 | — | — (Note: "Worldwide Beautiful" did not enter the Canadian Hot 100, but peaked at number 33 on the Hot Canadian Digital Song Sales chart.) | — | — | — | — | — | | Mixtape, Vol. 1 |
| "Be Like That" (with Swae Lee and Khalid) | 2020 | 19 | — | — | 53 | 6 | — | — | 6 | — | — | RIAA: 4× Platinum; ARIA: Gold; BPI: Silver; MC: 6× Platinum; RMNZ: Platinum | Mixtape, Vol. 1 |
| "Worship You" | 2020 | — (Note: "Worship You" did not enter the Billboard Hot 100, but peaked at number three on the Bubbling Under Hot 100 chart.) | 24 | 23 | — | — (Note: "Worship You" did not enter the Canadian Hot 100, but peaked at number 47 on the Hot Canadian Digital Song Sales chart.) | — | — | — | — | — | RIAA: Platinum | Mixtape, Vol. 1 |
| "Famous Friends" (with Chris Young) | 2021 | 21 | 2 | 1 | — | 28 | — | — | — | — | — | RIAA: 3× Platinum; MC: 3× Platinum | Famous Friends |
| "Memory" (with Blackbear) | 2021 | 50 | 9 | — | — | 28 | — | — | 12 | — | — | RIAA: 2× Platinum; ARIA: Gold; MC: 3× Platinum | Non-album single |
| "One Mississippi" | 2021 | 36 | 4 | 1 | — | 45 | — | — | — | — | — | RIAA: 2× Platinum; MC: 2× Platinum | Different Man |
| "Like I Love Country Music" | 2022 | 26 | 3 | 1 | — | 33 | — | — | — | — | — | RIAA: Platinum; MC: 2× Platinum | Different Man |
| "Grand" | 2022 | — (Note: "Grand" did not enter the Billboard Hot 100, but peaked at number three on the Bubbling Under Hot 100 chart.) | — | — | — | 77 | — | — | — | — | — | RIAA: Gold; MC: Gold | Different Man |
| "Thank God" (with Katelyn Brown) | 2022 | 13 | 2 | 1 | — | 43 | — | — | 28 | — | — | RIAA: 4× Platinum; MC: 3× Platinum; RMNZ: Gold | Different Man |
| "Bury Me in Georgia" | 2023 | 34 | 8 | 1 | — | 58 | — | — | — | — | — | RIAA: Platinum; MC: Platinum | Different Man |
| "I Can Feel It" | 2023 | 50 | 13 | 1 | — | 58 | — | — | — | — | — | RIAA: Gold; MC: Gold | The High Road |
| "Miles on It" (with Marshmello) | 2024 | 15 | 4 | 1 | 59 | 10 | — | 100 | 15 | — | 44 | RIAA: 4× Platinum; BPI: Gold; ARIA: Platinum; MC: 3× Platinum; RMNZ: Platinum | The High Road |
| "Backseat Driver" | 2024 | 60 | 16 | 2 | — | 87 | — | — | — | — | — | | The High Road |
| "Body Talk" (with Katelyn Brown) | 2024 | — | — | — | — | — | — | — | 34 | — | — | | The High Road |
| "2 Pair" | 2025 | — (Note: "2 Pair" did not enter the Billboard Hot 100, but peaked at number 25 on the Bubbling Under Hot 100 chart.) | — | 32 | — | — | — | — | 32 | — | — | | Non-album singles |
| "Woman" | 2026 | 46 | 14 | 2 | — | 55 | — | — | — | — | — | | Non-album singles |
| "Boots" (featuring Shania Twain) | 2026 | — (Note: "Boots" did not enter the Billboard Hot 100, but peaked at number 9 on the Bubbling Under Hot 100 chart.) | 36 | — | — | 79 | — | — | 27 | — | — | | Non-album singles |
| "Losing Hand" | 2026 | — | — | — | — | — | — | — | — | — | — | | Non-album singles |
"—" denotes releases that did not chart or were not released to that territory

=== As featured artist ===
| Title | Year | Peak chart positions | | Certifications | Album |
| Title | Year | US Country | CAN | Certifications | Album |
|---|---|---|---|---|---|
| "Believe" (with Brooks & Dunn) | 2019 | 42 | — | | Reboot |
| "Next to You" (Loud Luxury and Dvbbs featuring Kane Brown) | 2023 | — | 34 | MC: Gold | Non-album single |
| "Nothing Compares to You" (Mickey Guyton featuring Kane Brown) | 2023 | — | — | | House on Fire |
| "The One (Pero No Como Yo)" (Carín León featuring Kane Brown) | 2024 | 48 | — | | Non-album single |
"—" denotes releases that did not chart

== Other charted songs ==
| Title | Year | Peak chart positions | | | | | | Certifications | Album |
| Title | Year | US | US Country | US Country Airplay | US Latin | AUS Dig. | CAN | Certifications | Album |
|---|---|---|---|---|---|---|---|---|---|
| "Don't Go City on Me" | 2014 | — | — (Note: "Don't Go City on Me" did not enter the Hot Country Songs chart, but peaked at number 43 on the Country Digital Song Sales chart.) | — | — | — | — | | Closer |
| "Last Minute Late Night" | 2015 | — | 31 | — | — | — | — | | Chapter 1 |
| "I Love That I Hate You" | 2015 | — | 35 | — | — | — | — | | Non-album single |
| "There Goes My Everything" | 2016 | — | 27 | — | — | — | — | RIAA: Gold | Chapter 1 |
| "Wide Open" | 2016 | — | 34 | — | — | — | — | | Chapter 1 |
| "Excuses" | 2016 | — | 36 | — | — | — | — | | Chapter 1 |
| "Ain't No Stopping Us Now" | 2016 | 88 | 19 | — | — | — | — (Note: "Ain’t No Stopping Us Now" did not enter the Billboard Canadian Hot 100, but peaked at number 35 on the Hot Canadian Digital Song Sales chart.) | RIAA: Gold; MC: Gold | Kane Brown |
| "Hometown" | 2016 | — | 48 | — | — | — | — | RIAA: Gold; MC: Gold | Kane Brown |
| "Better Place" | 2016 | — | — | — | — | — | — | RIAA: Gold | Kane Brown |
| "Found You" | 2017 | 80 | 13 | — | — | — | — (Note: "Found You" did not enter the Billboard Canadian Hot 100, but peaked at number 30 on the Hot Canadian Digital Song Sales chart.) | RIAA: Platinum; MC: Gold | Kane Brown |
| "What's Mine Is Yours" | 2017 | — | 34 | — | — | — | — | RIAA: Platinum; MC: Gold | Kane Brown |
| "Setting the Night on Fire" (with Chris Young) | 2017 | — | 45 | — | — | — | — | | Kane Brown |
| "Short Skirt Weather" | 2018 | — | 42 | 50 | — | — | — | RIAA: Gold; MC: Gold | Experiment |
| "Weekend" | 2018 | — | 37 | — | — | — | — | RIAA: Gold | Experiment |
| "Baby Come Back to Me" | 2018 | — | 42 | — | — | — | — | | Experiment |
| "Lost in the Middle of Nowhere" (featuring Becky G) | 2018 | — (Note: "Lost in the Middle of Nowhere" did not enter the Billboard Hot 100, but peaked at number 24 on the Bubbling Under Hot 100 chart.) | 39 | — | 13 | — | — | RIAA: Gold; MC: Gold | Experiment |
| "Like a Rodeo" | 2019 | 90 | 17 | — | — | 35 | — (Note: "Like a Rodeo" did not enter the Billboard Canadian Hot 100, but peaked at number 22 on the Hot Canadian Digital Song Sales chart.) | RIAA: Gold; MC: Platinum | Experiment |
| "For My Daughter" | 2019 | 90 | 19 | — | — | — | — (Note: "For My Daughter" did not enter the Billboard Canadian Hot 100, but peaked at number 8 on the Hot Canadian Digital Song Sales chart.) | RIAA: Gold; MC: Gold | Experiment |
| "Last Time I Say Sorry" (with John Legend) | 2020 | 89 | 18 | — | — | — | — (Note: "Last Time I Say Sorry" did not enter the Billboard Canadian Hot 100, but peaked at number 10 on the Hot Canadian Digital Song Sales chart.) | RIAA: Gold | Mixtape, Vol. 1 |
| "On Me" (with Thomas Rhett featuring Ava Max) | 2020 | — | — | — | — | — | 91 | RIAA: Gold | Scoob! The Album |
| "Drift Away" (iHeart Live) | 2020 | — | — | 59 | — | — | — | | Non-album singles |
| "Blessed & Free" (with H.E.R.) | 2021 | ― | 36 | ― | ― | ― | ― | RIAA: Gold | Non-album singles |
| "Whiskey Sour" | 2022 | ― (Note: "Whiskey Sour" did not enter the Billboard Hot 100, but peaked at number eight on the Bubbling Under Hot 100 chart.) | 28 | ― | ― | ― | ― (Note: "Whiskey Sour" did not enter the Billboard Canadian Hot 100, but peaked at number 34 on the Hot Canadian Digital Song Sales chart.) | RIAA: Gold | Different Man |
| "Leave You Alone" | 2022 | 86 | 21 | ― | ― | ― | ― | RIAA: Gold | Different Man |
| "Blue Christmas" | 2022 | 73 | 14 | — | ― | ― | ― | RIAA: Gold | Non-album single |
| "Haunted" (with Jelly Roll) | 2025 | 58 | 14 | ― | ― | ― | 79 | | The High Road |
"—" denotes releases that did not chart

== Music videos ==
| Title | Year | Director |
|---|---|---|
| "Used to Love You Sober" | 2015 | Clark Jackson |
| "Used to Love You Sober" | 2016 | David Poag |
| "Can't Stop Love" (with Chandler Stephens) | 2016 | —N/a |
| "Thunder in the Rain" | 2016 | TK McKamy |
| "What Ifs" (featuring Lauren Alaina) | 2017 | P.R. Brown |
| "Heaven" | 2017 | Alex Alvga |
| "What's Mine Is Yours" | 2017 | Alex Alvga |
| "Found You" | 2017 | |
| "Lose It" | 2018 | Alex Alvga |
| "Weekend" | 2018 | Alex Alvga |
| "Baby Come Back to Me" | 2018 | Jim Shea |
| "Homesick" | 2018 | Alex Alvga |
| "Saturday Nights (Remix)" | 2019 | —N/a |
| "Lost in the Middle of Nowhere" | 2019 | Alex Alvga |
| "Good as You" | 2019 | Theresa Wingert |
| "Lost in the Middle of Nowhere" (English version) (with Becky G) | 2019 | Norry Niven |
| "Lost in the Middle of Nowhere" (Spanish version) (with Becky G) | 2019 | John Scarpati |
| "One Thing Right" (with Marshmello) | 2019 | Robert Hales |
| "Homesick" (Alternate Video) | 2019 | —N/a |
| "Last Time I Say Sorry" (with John Legend) | 2020 | Kane Brown / John Legend |
| "Cool Again" (with Nelly) | 2020 | Alex Alvga |
| "Be Like That" (with Swae Lee and Khalid) | 2020 | Alex Alvga |
| "Worldwide Beautiful" | 2020 | Alex Alvga |
| "Worship You" | 2020 | Alex Alvga |
| "Thank God" (featuring Katelyn Brown) | 2022 | Alex Alvga |
| "Like I Love Country Music" | 2022 | Alex Alvga |
| "Bury Me in Georgia" | 2023 | Alex Alvga |
| "I Can Feel It" | 2023 | Alex Alvga |
| "Miles on It" (with Marshmello) | 2024 | Alex Alvga |
