= Mixtape, Vol. 1 (EP) =

EP by Kane Brown
- Released: August 14, 2020
- Genre: Country
- Length: 22:09
- Label: RCA Records Nashville
- Producers: Andrew Goldstein (track 6); Charlie Handsome (track 2); Dann Huff (all tracks except 2 & 6); Lindsay Rimes (tracks 1 & 5)

Kane Brown chronology
Experiment (2018)	Mixtape, Vol. 1 (2020)	Different Man (2022)

Singles from Mixtape, Vol. 1
- 1. "Cool Again" Released: April 22, 2020; 2. "Worldwide Beautiful" Released: June 4, 2020; 3. "Be Like That" Released: July 10, 2020; 4. "Worship You" Released: October 26, 2020

Mixtape, Vol. 1 is the third extended play (EP) by American country music singer Kane Brown. The seven-song EP was released on August 14, 2020, as his second EP with the Sony Music Nashville label, with the first Sony EP being Chapter 1. He had earlier released an independent EP on his own label, titled Closer.

== Background and release ==
Brown co-wrote all seven songs on the EP, with co-writing songwriters being Shy Carter, Sam Ellis and Matt McGinn. Dann Huff produced or co-produced five of the seven songs.

Mixtape Vol. 1 includes the single "Cool Again", a pre-release from April 2020, and the lead single off the EP.

It was followed by "Worldwide Beautiful" in June 2020, aimed to highlight peace and equality; it benefits the Boys and Girls Club of America. It also gained notability being released after the murder of George Floyd. The music video, winner of the 2021 ACM Awards Video of the Year, was filmed partly on the property of session and touring bassist Todd Ashburn in the Nashville area, and in downtown Mt. Pleasant, Tennessee.

"Be Like That", a collaboration with Swae Lee and Khalid, was the last release in July 2020, immediately preceding the release of the EP on August 14. Brown also had some chart success with the track "Worship You", which was later released as a single to country radio.

== Track listing ==
All tracks are written by Kane Brown, with additional co-writers as noted.

Mixtape, Vol. 1 track listing
No.	Title	Writer(s)	Length
1.	"Cool Again"	Josh Hoge; Lindsay Rimes; Matt McGinn	2:44
2.	"Be Like That" (with Swae Lee & Khalid)	Alexander Izquierdo; Khalid Robinson; Khalif Brown; Mike Will; Ryan Vojtesak	3:11
3.	"Worship You"	Izquierdo; McGinn; Vojtesak	3:25
4.	"BFE"	McGinn; Sam Ellis; Taylor Phillips; Will Weatherly	3:00
5.	"Didn't Know What Love Was"	Rimes; McGinn; Shy Carter	3:07
6.	"Last Time I Say Sorry" (with John Legend)	Andrew Goldstein; John Stevens; McGinn	3:14
7.	"Worldwide Beautiful"	Jordan Schmidt; Ryan Hurd; Carter	3:28
Total length:			22:09

== Personnel ==
Adapted from liner notes.

- Robert Bailey - background vocals
- Charlie Bisharat - concert master (track 6)
- Danielle Blakey - background vocals
- Christopher Blue - background vocals
- Jacob Braun - cello (track 6)
- Kane Brown - lead vocals, background vocals
- David Campbell - string arrangements (track 6)
- Shy Carter - background vocals
- Dave Cohen - B-3 organ, piano
- Andrew Duckles - viola (track 6)
- Stuart Duncan - fiddle
- Jason Eskridge - background vocals
- Kim Fleming - background vocals
- Paul Franklin - steel guitar
- Andrew Goldstein - guitar (track 6), keyboards (track 6), programming (track 6), shakers (track 6), synth bass (track 6)
- Vicki Hampton - background vocals
- Kyla Harris - background vocals
- Dann Huff - B-3 organ, electric guitar, electric guitar solo, gut string guitar, piano, programming, mandocello, synthesizer, synth bass, tambourine
- David Huff - programming, synthesizer, synth bass
- Charlie Judge - B-3 organ, keyboards, piano, strings, synthesizer
- Khalid - featured vocals (track 2)
- Swae Lee - featured vocals (track 2)
- John Legend - piano (track 6), duet vocals (track 6)
- Matt McGinn - background vocals
- Miles McPherson - drums
- Justin Niebank - programming
- Sara Parkins - violin (track 6)
- Michael Piroli - Engineer (track 2)
- Lindsay Rimes - banjo, bass guitar, dobro, electric guitar, keyboards, programming, steel guitar, synthesizer, synth bass, vocoder, background vocals
- Jerry Roe - drums
- Jimmie Lee Sloas - bass guitar
- Tereza Stanislav - violin (track 6)
- Aaron Sterling - drums, percussion
- Russell Terrell - background vocals
- Ilya Toshinsky - acoustic guitar, banjo, bouzouki, dobro, dulcimer, electric guitar, mandolin
- Travis Toy - steel guitar
- Josephina Vergara - violin (track 6)
- Derek Wells - electric guitar
- Alex Wright - keyboards

== Charts ==
=== Weekly charts ===
Chart (2020)	Peak position
Canadian Albums (Billboard)	16
US Billboard 200	15
US Top Country Albums (Billboard)	2

=== Year-end charts ===
Chart (2020)	Position
US Top Country Albums (Billboard)	41

Chart (2021)	Position
US Top Country Albums (Billboard)	28
