= Here on Earth (album) =

Studio album by Tim McGraw
- Released: August 21, 2020
- Genres: Country; country pop
- Length: 61:43 (standard edition); 70:13 (Target deluxe edition); 91:51 (2021 ultimate edition)
- Label: Big Machine
- Producers: Byron Gallimore; Tim McGraw

Tim McGraw chronology
The Rest of Our Life (2017)	Here on Earth (2020)	McGraw Machine Hits: 2013-2019 (2020)

Singles from Here on Earth
- 1. "I Called Mama" Released: May 8, 2020; 2. "Undivided" Released: January 13, 2021; 3. "7500 OBO" Released: August 2, 2021

Professional ratings
Review scores
Source	Rating
AllMusic	3.5/5 stars

Here on Earth is the fifteenth solo studio album and sixteenth studio album overall by American country music singer Tim McGraw. It was released on August 21, 2020, by Big Machine Records. It is McGraw's first album since rejoining Big Machine. The album was produced by McGraw and Byron Gallimore. The release was preceded by the release of "I Called Mama".

== Background ==
Following the release of his 2015 album, Damn Country Music, McGraw's contract with Big Machine Records expired. McGraw and his wife Faith Hill signed a deal with Sony Music Nashville's parent company Sony Music Entertainment in February 2017. This deal saw the release of McGraw and Hill's first duet album, The Rest of Our Life, in November 2017, on Sony's Arista Nashville imprint. Two solo singles followed, 2018's "Neon Church" and 2019's "Thought About You", both released on Sony's Columbia Nashville imprint. McGraw returned to Big Machine Records in February 2020, following his departure from Sony earlier in the year.

The album was described in a press release as "a collection of songs McGraw brought together to create vignettes of shared human emotions such as love, relationships, introspection and fun. The album as a whole provides a musical tapestry of life and a shared experience that we can use to connect all the different lives that we live, all the different parts of the world that we come from and use music as the universal language to bring people together."

== Release and promotion ==
The album title was announced in February 2020 along with the news that McGraw had returned to Big Machine Records. The album was released on August 21, 2020.

=== Singles ===
The album's first single, "I Called Mama", was released in May, 2020, and reached at number 8 on the Billboard Hot Country Songs chart, number 2 on the Billboard Country Airplay chart, the Top 30 on the Billboard Adult Contemporary chart, and number 53 on the Billboard Hot 100. The song peaked at number 2 on the Billboard Canada Country singles chart.

The music video premiered on May 27, 2020, and is "a tribute to mothers everywhere" with clips of McGraw's fans and their mothers, as well as appearances by his own mother, Betty Trimble, and wife, Faith Hill.

The title track was released as a promotional single on July 10, 2020, along with the album's pre-order. The song's music video premiered the same day.

The second single to radio, "Undivided" with Tyler Hubbard, was released on January 13, 2021. It is part of the Ultimate Edition of the album released April 9, 2021. This marks McGraw's and Hubbard's second collaboration following "May We All" in 2016.

"7500 OBO", which was originally slated to be a single before the release of "Undivided", was released as the album's third single on August 2, 2021.

=== Tour ===
The album was originally planned to be accompanied by the Here on Earth Tour, which was scheduled to begin on July 10, 2020, but it was cancelled due to the 2020 COVID-19 pandemic.

== Track listing ==
Here on Earth track listing
No.	Title	Writer(s)	Length
1.	"L.A."	Carlton Anderson; Shane Minor; Phil O'Donnell	3:53
2.	"Chevy Spaceship"	Johnny Price	4:20
3.	"Here on Earth"	Jessie Jo Dillon; Chase McGill; Jon Nite	4:21
4.	"Damn Sure Do"	Tony Lane; James T. Slater	4:12
5.	"Hallelujahville"	Tom Douglas; Blake Griffith; Brett Taylor	4:26
6.	"Good Taste in Women"	Jaren Johnston; Bryan Simpson; Nathan Spicer	3:47
7.	"Hard to Stay Mad At"	Luke Laird; Shane McAnally; Lori McKenna	4:10
8.	"Sheryl Crow"	Wendell Mobley; Neil Thrasher; Laura Veltz	3:20
9.	"Not from California"	Levi Hummon; Marcus Hummon; Matt McVanney; Brad Warren; Brett Warren	3:01
10.	"Hold You Tonight"	Ross Copperman; Jon Nite	3:56
11.	"7500 OBO"	Spicer; Matt McGinn; Jennifer Schott	3:41
12.	"If I Was a Cowboy"	Zack Dyer; Lonnie Fowler; Dave Turnbull	3:53
13.	"I Called Mama"	Marv Green; Lance Miller; Jimmy Yeary	3:32
14.	"Gravy"	T. Douglas; Andy Albert; Allen Shamblin	3:36
15.	"War of Art"	Miller; Brett Warren; Brad Warren; Jeremy Spillman	3:54
16.	"Doggone"	Johnston; T. Douglas; Claire Douglas; Aimee Mayo	3:35
Total length:			61:43

Target deluxe edition bonus tracks
No.	Title	Writer(s)	Length
17.	"Truth Is"	Pete Good; Jennifer; Hanson; Jeffrey East	5:10
18.	"Cuttin' Onions"	Monty Criswell; Brad Warren; Brett Warren	3:20
Total length:			70:13

2021 Ultimate Edition
No.	Title	Writer(s)	Length
17.	"Undivided" (with Tyler Hubbard)	Hubbard; Chris Loocke	2:57
18.	"Thought About You"	Brad Warren; Brett Warren; Lee Thomas Miller	3:46
19.	"Neon Church"	Ben Goldsmith; Ben Stennis; Ross Ellis Lipsey	3:33
20.	"Cuttin’ Onions"	Monty Criswell; Brad Warren; Brett Warren	3:19
21.	"Truth Is"	Pete Good; Jennifer Schott; Hanson; Jeffrey East	5:10
22.	"God Moves the Pen"	James Slater; Tony Lane	3:41
23.	"Keep Your Eyes On Me" (with Faith Hill)	Tim McGraw; Faith Hill; McAnally; McKenna	4:10
24.	"Gravity"	Tim McGraw; McKenna	3:28
Total length:			91:51

== Personnel ==
Performers

- Greg Barnhill – backing vocals
- Byron Gallimore – backing vocals
- Tania Hancheroff – backing vocals
- Wes Hightower – backing vocals

- Faith Hill – featured vocals
- Tyler Hubbard – featured vocals
- Tim McGraw – lead vocals
- Sarah West – backing vocals

Musicians

- Charlie Bisharat – violin
- Jackie Brand – violin
- Jacob Braun – cello
- Paul Bushnell – keyboards, bass guitar, fiddle
- David Campbell – string arrangements, conductor
- Corey Crowder – programming
- Eric Darken – percussion
- Mario De León – violin
- Andrew Duckles – viola
- Dan Dugmore – steel guitar
- Stuart Duncan – fiddle
- Timothy Eckert – upright bass
- The Filmharmonic Orchestra – strings
- Matt Funes – viola
- Shannon Forrest – drums, percussion
- Byron Gallimore – keyboards, acoustic guitar, electric guitar
- Marvin B. Gordy – percussion
- Jessica E. Guideri – violin
- Charlie Judge – keyboards
- Tamara Hatwan – violin
- Suzie Katayama – cello
- Adam Klemens – conductor
- Marisa Kuney – violin
- Anthony LaMarchina – cello
- Troy Lancaster – electric guitar
- Timothy Landauer – cell
- Michael Landau – baritone guitar, electric guitar
- Songa Lee – violin
- Natalie Leggett – violin

- David Levita – electric guitar
- Dane Little – cello
- Wes Little – drums
- Lorand Lokuszta – violin
- Todd Lombardo – acoustic guitar, mandolin, banjo
- Erik Lutkins – percussion
- Luke Maurer – viola
- Darrin McCann – viola
- Serena McKinney – violin
- Miles McPherson – drums
- Jamie Muhoberac – keyboards
- Steve Nathan – keyboards, piano
- Grace Oh – violin
- Alyssa Park – violin
- Sara Parkins – violin
- Sol Philcox-Littlefield – electric guitar
- Michele Richards – violin
- Jeff Roach – keyboards
- Mike Rojas – keyboards
- Neil Samples – violin
- David Stone – upright bass
- Sarah Thornblade – violin
- Ilya Toshinsky – acoustic guitar, dobro, mandolin, banjo
- Mary Katherine Vanosdale – violin
- Josefina Vergara – violin
- Derek Wells – electric guitar
- John Wittenberg – viola
- Glenn Worf – bass guitar
- Alex Wright – Hammond B-3 organ, keyboards, piano, synthesizer

Production

- Adam Ayan – mastering
- Steve Churchyard – string recording
- Corey Crowder – producer
- Shannon Forrest – recording
- Byron Gallimore – producer, mixing

- Tyler Hubbard – producer
- Erik Lutkins – recording, mixing
- Tim McGraw – producer
- Doug Rich – copy coordinator
- Elvis Presley – quotation author

Visual and imagery

- Sandi Spika Borchetta – art direction
- Kelly Clague – art direction
- Danny Clinch – cover photography
- Michael Fitcher – photography

- David Needleman – photography
- Justin Ford – art direction
- JP Robinson – art direction, design
- Stevie Robinson –design

== Charts ==
=== Weekly charts ===
Chart (2020)	Peak position
Australian Albums (ARIA)	10
Canadian Albums (Billboard)	37
Scottish Albums (Official Charts)	34
Swiss Albums (Schweizer Hitparade)	89
UK Album Downloads (Official Charts)	19
UK Country Albums (Official Charts)	2
US Billboard 200	14
US Top Country Albums (Billboard)	1

=== Year-end charts ===
Chart (2020)	Position
US Top Country Albums (Billboard)	72
