= Ain't No Stopping Us Now (Kane Brown song) =

Promotional single by Kane Brown

from the album Kane Brown
- Released: June 17, 2016
- Genre: Country
- Length: 3:03
- Label: RCA Nashville
- Songwriters: Kane Brown; Jamie Paulin; Jordan Schmidt
- Producer: Matt McVaney

Kane Brown singles chronology
"Used to Love You Sober" (2015)	"Ain't No Stopping Us Now" (2016)	"Thunder in the Rain" (2016)

"Ain't No Stopping Us Now" is a song co-written and recorded by American country music artist Kane Brown. It was released on June 18, 2016, as a promotional single from his 2016 self-titled debut album. Brown wrote the song with Jamie Paulin and Jordan Schmidt.

== Content ==
The song describes the narrator celebrating the summer, mentioning road trips and the beach.

== Critical reception ==
Markos Papadatos of the Digital Journal gave the song a favorable review, rating it 4.5 out of 5 stars and comparing Brown's baritone vocal to that of Tyler Hubbard (from Florida Georgia Line) and Chris Young. He concluded his review by writing "Overall, Kane Brown shows his exceptional talent on "Ain't No Stopping Us Now."

== Commercial performance ==
The song has sold 49,000 copies in the United States as of July 2016.

== Chart performance ==
Chart (2016)	Peak position
US Billboard Hot 100	88
US Hot Country Songs (Billboard)	19

== Certifications ==
Region	Certification	Certified units/sales
Canada (Music Canada)	Gold	40,000^{‡}
^{‡} Sales+streaming figures based on certification alone.
