= Matt McGinn (American songwriter) =

American songwriter

- Born: Matthew McGinn
- Origin: Ashburn, Virginia, U.S.
- Genres: Country, pop, rock
- Occupation: Songwriter
- Years active: 2012–present

Matt McGinn is an American songwriter who works mainly in the field of country music. He is best known for his work with Kane Brown, and has also written songs for Tim McGraw and Luke Combs.

== Career ==
McGinn began writing songs in 2012, having previously lived in Virginia. Soon afterward, he was signed to Shane McAnally's songwriting publishing company Smack Songs.

McGinn is a frequent collaborator of Kane Brown, having written his singles "What Ifs", "Heaven", and "One Thing Right". He also co-wrote "Even Though I'm Leaving" for Luke Combs. In 2020, McGinn was named Songwriter of the Year by SESAC. He also co-wrote "7500 OBO" for Tim McGraw.

In September 2023, McGinn signed a publishing deal with Boom Music Group and Cinq Music Group. On October 27, 2023, he was arrested after allegedly threatening to kill his girlfriend. Boom Music Group cut ties with him after the arrest.

== Awards and nominations ==
| Year | Association | Category | Nominated work | Result |
|---|---|---|---|---|
| 2018 | AIMP Nashville Awards | Rising Songwriter of the Year | N/A | Nominated |
| 2018 | Billboard Music Awards | Top Country Song | "What Ifs" | Nominated |
| 2018 | American Music Awards | Favorite Country Song | "Heaven" | Won |
| 2018 | SESAC Country Awards | Song of the Year | ”Heaven” | Won |
| 2018 | SESAC Country Awards | Songwriter of the Year | N/A | Won |
| 2019 | Billboard Music Awards | Top Country Song | "Heaven" | Nominated |
| 2020 | SESAC Country Awards | Songwriter of the Year | N/A | Won |

== Discography ==
| Year | Artist | Album | Song | Co-writer(s) |
2023
| 2023 | Staind | Confessions of the Fallen | "Lowest In Me" | Aaron Lewis, Johnny April, Erik Ron, Mike Mushok |
| 2023 | Staind | Confessions of the Fallen | "Was Any Of It Real" | Aaron Lewis, Johnny April, Erik Ron, Mike Mushok |
| 2023 | Staind | Confessions of the Fallen | "In This Condition" | Aaron Lewis, Johnny April, Erik Ron, Mike Mushok |
| 2023 | Staind | Confessions of the Fallen | "Here And Now" | Aaron Lewis, Johnny April, Erik Ron, Mike Mushok |
| 2023 | Staind | Confessions of the Fallen | "Out Of Time" | Aaron Lewis, Johnny April, Erik Ron, Mike Mushok |
| 2023 | Staind | Confessions of the Fallen | "Cycle Of Hurting" | Aaron Lewis, Johnny April, Erik Ron, Mike Mushok |
| 2023 | Staind | Confessions of the Fallen | "Fray" | Aaron Lewis, Johnny April, Erik Ron, Mike Mushok |
| 2023 | Staind | Confessions of the Fallen | "Better Days" | Aaron Lewis, Johnny April, Erik Ron, Mike Mushok |
| 2023 | Staind | Confessions of the Fallen | "Hate Me Too" | Aaron Lewis, Johnny April, Erik Ron, Mike Mushok |
| 2023 | Staind | Confessions of the Fallen | "Confessions Of The Fallen" | Aaron Lewis, Johnny April, Erik Ron, Mike Mushok |
| 2023 | George Birge | Mind On You | "Forever And A Day" | George Birge, Lalo Guzman |
| 2023 | George Birge | Mind On You | Chasin' A Feeling | George Birge, Lalo Guzman, Michael Tyler |
| 2023 | Corey Kent | Blacktop | "Gone As You" | Casey Brown, Travis Wood |
| 2023 | Josh Abbott Band | My Dad And His Truck | "My Dad And His Truck" | Josh Abbott, Neil Medley |
| 2023 | Meghan Patrick | Greatest Show On Dirt | "Greatest Show On Dirt" | Meghan Patrick, Trannie Anderson, Jake Mitchell |
| 2023 | Meghan Patrick | Ours | "Ours" | Meghan Patrick, Joey Hyde, Lydia Vaughn |
| 2023 | Rodell Duff | Good Days | "Good Days" | Rodell Duff, Ryan Creamer, Dylan Maloney |
| 2023 | Five Roses | Get To Me | "Get To Me" | Jenn Schott, Zach Abend |
2022
| 2022 | Kane Brown | Different Man | "Bury Me In Georgia" | Jordan Schmidt, Josh Hoge, Kane Brown |
| 2022 | Kane Brown | Different Man | "See You Like I Do" | Devin Dawson, Lindsay Rimes, Kane Brown |
| 2022 | Kane Brown | Different Man | "Like I Love Country Music" | Jordan Schmidt, Taylor Phillips, Kane Brown |
| 2022 | Cheat Codes Feat. MacKenzie Porter | One Night Left | "One Night Left" | MacKenzie Porter, Josh Kerr, Parker Welling |
| 2022 | Cheat Codes Feat. Russell Dickerson | I Remember | "I Remember" | Alysa Vanderheym, Logan Turner, Chris Ryan, Russell Dickerson |
| 2022 | Cheat Codes Feat. Russell Dickerson & Dixie D'Amelio | I Remember - Remix | "I Remember - Remix" | Alysa Vanderheym, Logan Turner, Chris Ryan, Russell Dickerson |
| 2022 | Andrew Jannakos | Heaven’s Like A Hometown | "Heaven’s Like A Hometown" | Jordan Minton, Eric Arjes, Andrew Jannakos |
| 2022 | Kane Brown | Like I Love Country Music | "Like I Love Country Music" | Kane Brown, Jordan Schmidt, Taylor Phillips |
| 2022 | Dylan Scott Feat. Jimmie Allen | Can’t Have Mine | "In Our Blood" | Brad Remple, David Fanning |
| 2022 | Brandon Ray | Change My Mind | "Change My Mind" | Brandon Ray, Joe Clemmons |
| 2022 | Jamie Miller | Broken Memories-EP | "Longer" | Jamie Miller, Steve Solomon, Cal Shipiro |
| 2022 | Filmore | Falling Out Of Love | "Falling Out Of Love" | Tyler Filmore, Lindsay Rimes |
| 2022 | Ross Copperman | Stay Blessed | "Stay Blessed" | Ross Copperman, James Abrahart |
| 2022 | Dustin Lynch | Blue In The Sky | "Party Mode" | Roman Alexander, Ryan Beaver, Jerry Flowers, Jared Keim |
| 2022 | Aaron Lewis | Frayed At Both Ends | "Someone" | Aaron Lewis, Paul Barber |
| 2022 | Aaron Lewis | Frayed At Both Ends | "Life Behind Bars" | Lewis, Hoge |
| 2022 | Aaron Lewis | Frayed At Both Ends | "Sticks and Stones" | Lewis, Paul Barber |
| 2021 | Blake Shelton | Body Language | "Body Language" | Ryan Beaver, Colton Swon, Zach Swon |
| 2021 | Chris Young | Famous Friends | "Rescue Me" | Chris Young, Josh Hoge, Mark Holman, Christian Stalnecker |
| 2021 | Parmalee | For You | "Miss You Now" | David Fanning, Michael Tyler |
| 2021 | Ryan Hurd | Pelago | "Hell Is An Island" | Ryan Hurd, Aaron Eshuis, Shane McAnally |
| 2021 | Teddy Robb | Cigarettes’ll Kill Ya | "Cigarettes’ll Kill Ya" | Pete Good, Ben Stennis |
| 2021 | Taylor Phillips ft. Upchurch | Good Out Here | "Good Out Here" | Taylor Phillips, Michael Ray, Ryan Upchurch, Will Weatherly |
| 2021 | Johnny Day | Left Hand Heavy | "Left Hand Heavy" | Blake Hubbard, Jerrod Ingram, Adam James |
| 2021 | Renee Blair | Turn Up The Night | "Turn Up The Night" | Kane Brown, Corey Crowder, Jordan Schmidt |
| 2020 | Kane Brown | Mixtape Volume 1 | "Cool Again" | Kane Brown, Josh Hoge, Lindsay Rimes |
| 2020 | Kane Brown | Mixtape Volume 1 | "Worship You" | Brown, Alexander Izquierdo, Ryan Vojtesak |
| 2020 | Kane Brown | Mixtape Volume 1 | "BFE" | Brown, Sam Ellis, Taylor Phillips, Will Weatherly |
| 2020 | Kane Brown | Mixtape Volume 1 | "Didn't Know What Love Was" | Brown, Shy Carter, Lindsay Rimes |
| 2020 | Kane Brown | Mixtape Volume 1 | "Last Time I Say Sorry" Feat. John Legend | Brown, Andrew Goldstein, John Legend |
| 2020 | Kane Brown | Cool Again: Remix Feat. Nelly | "Cool Again" Feat. Nelly | Kane Brown, Josh Hoge, Lindsay Rimes, Nelly |
| 2020 | Jimmie Allen | Bettie James | "Drunk & I Miss You" Feat. Mickey Guyton | Lauren LaRue, Tommy Cecil |
| 2020 | Tim McGraw | Here on Earth | "7500 OBO" | Nathan Spicer, Jennifer Schott |
| 2020 | MacKenzie Porter | Drinkin' Songs: The Collection | "Seeing Other People" | Emily Falvey, Jason Afable |
| 2020 | Lindsay Ell | Heart Theory | "Want Me Back" | Lindsay Ell, Kane Brown, Lindsay Rimes |
| 2020 | Lindsay Ell | Heart Theory | "Wrong Girl" | Ell, Steph Jones, Luke Niccoli |
| 2020 | Lindsay Ell | Heart Theory | "The Other Side" | Ell, Jessie Jo Dillon |
| 2020 | Lindsay Ell | Heart Theory | "Ready To Love" | Ell, Jessie Jo Dillon, Joey Hyde |
| 2020 | Renee Blair | Get The Girl | "Get The Girl" | Renee Blair, Jordan Schmidt |
| 2020 | Renee Blair | Heatin' Up My Summer | "Heatin' Up My Summer" | Renee Blair, Jordan Schmidt |
| 2020 | Kyle Clark | Kyle Clark EP | "First Time Feels" | Kyle Clark, Jordan Schmidt |
| 2020 | Josh Abbott Band | The Luckiest | "The Luckiest" | Josh Abbott, Joe Clemmons |
| 2020 | Chrissy Metz | Actress | "Actress" | Chrissy Metz, Nicolette Hayford |
| 2020 | Cady Groves | Bless My Heart | "Camo" | Cady Groves |
| 2020 | Sarah Allison Turner | The Idea Of You | "The Idea Of You" | Sarah Allison Turner, Daniel Ross |
| 2020 | Drew Parker | While You're Gone EP | "The Runway" | Drew Parker, James McNair |
| 2019 | Marshmello | One Thing Right | "One Thing Right" | Kane Brown, Christopher Comstock, Jesse Frasure, Josh Hoge |
| 2019 | Cassadee Pope | Stages | "If My Heart Had A Heart" | Hannah Ellis, Josh Kerr |
| 2019 | Sam Riggs | Love & Panic | "Until My Heart Stops Beating" | Chris Loocke, Sam Riggs, Andy Sheridan |
| 2019 | Lauren Duski | Midwestern Girl | "Runnin' (To You)" | Ryan Beaver, Lauren Duski |
| 2019 | Renee Blair | Better Off | "Better Off" | Renee Blair, Walker Hayes, Shane McAnally, Jordan Schmidt |
| 2019 | Renee Blair | Girlfriend | "Girlfriend" | Renee Blair, Jordan Schmidt |
| 2019 | Ryan Hurd | Platonic EP | "Platonic" | Ryan Hurd, Nathan Spicer, Ryan Beaver |
| 2019 | John Gurney | Speak Of The Devil | "Speak Of The Devil" | John Gurney, Neil Medley |
| 2019 | Joey Hyde | Looks Like You | "Looks Like You" | Joey Hyde, Joe Clemmons |
| 2018 | Kane Brown | Experiment | "Baby Come Back To Me" | Kane Brown, Chase McGill, Will Weatherly |
| 2018 | Kane Brown | Experiment | "Homesick" | Brock Berryhill, Brown, Taylor Phillips |
| 2018 | Kane Brown | Experiment | "One Night Only" | Brown, Corey Crowder, Josh Hoge |
| 2018 | Kane Brown | Experiment | "My Where I Come From" | Brown, Chase McGill, Will Weatherly |
| 2018 | Adam Sanders | Adam Sanders | "Anything Like Me" | Adam Sanders, Tommy Cecil |
| 2018 | Michael Ray | Amos | "I'm Gonna Miss You" | Corey Crowder |
| 2018 | Renee Blair | Gotta Quit Drinkin | "Gotta Quit Drinkin" | Renee Blair, Kylie Sackley |
| 2018 | Renee Blair | Me Tonight | "Me Tonight" | Renee Blair, Shane McAnally, Jordan Schmidt |
| 2018 | Teddy Robb | Lead Me On | "Lead Me On" | Ryan Beaver, Aaron Eshuis, Teddy Robb |
| 2018 | Chance McKinney | I2 | "Call You Quits" | Jason Massey, April Geesbrecht |
| 2017 | Kane Brown | Kane Brown (Deluxe Edition) | "Heaven" | Shy Carter, Lindsay Rymes |
| 2017 | The Swon Brothers | Pretty Cool Scars EP | "About Last Night" | The Swon Brothers, Joey Hyde |
| 2017 | Walker Hayes | Boom | "Prescriptions" | Walker Hayes |
| 2017 | Kylie Morgan | Christmas Without You | "Christmas Without You" | Kylie Morgan, Aaron Eshuis |
| 2016 | Kane Brown | Chapter 1 | "Last Minute Late Night" | Corey Crowder, Ben Caver |
| 2016 | Florida Georgia Line | Dig Your Roots | "Island" | Jordan Schmidt, Ryan Hurd |
| 2016 | Kane Brown | Kane Brown | "What Ifs" feat. Lauren Alaina | Kane Brown, Jordan Schmidt |
| 2016 | Madeline Merlo | Free Soul | "Whatcha Wanna Do About It" | Connie Harrington, Steve Moakler |
| 2015 | Josh Abbott Band | Front Row Seat | "Wasn't That Drunk" feat. Carly Pearce | Neil Medley, Emily Weisband |
| 2015 | Maddie & Tae | Start Here | "Right Here, Right Now" | Taylor Dye, Maddie Marlow |
| 2015 | Hinder | When The Smoke Clears | "Hit The Ground" | Corey Crowder, Marshall Dutton, Cody Hanson |
| 2015 | Clayton Gardner | Under The Lights | "Only Thing Missing" | Jacob Davis |
| 2015 | Clayton Gardner | Under The Lights | "How To Love" | Aaron Eshuis, Jon Mabe |
| 2014 | Adam Brand | My Side of the Street | "Right On The Money" | Corey Crowder, Cale Dodds |
| 2014 | MacKenzie Porter | MacKenzie Porter | "One of These Days" | MacKenzie Porter, Parker Welling |
| 2014 | MacKenzie Porter | MacKenzie Porter | "Son Of A" | Porter |
| 2014 | Gavin Slate | Don't Be Scared At All | "Leave You To See" | Gavin Slate |
| 2013 | Jake Owen | Days of Gold | "Surefire Feeling" | Ryan Hurd, Steve Moakler |
| 2012 | Jake Owen | Endless Summer EP | "Surefire Feeling" | Ryan Hurd, Steve Moakler |
