= Until My Voice Goes Out =

Studio album by Josh Abbott Band
- Released: August 18, 2017
- Genre: Country
- Label: Pretty Damn Tough, Reviver

Josh Abbott Band chronology
Front Row Seat (2015)	Until My Voice Goes Out (2017)	Catching Fire (2019)

Until My Voice Goes Out is the fifth studio album by country band Josh Abbott Band. It was released on August 18, 2017 via Pretty Damn Tough and Reviver. The album title comes from Josh Abbott recording all the vocals for the album in one night. It peaked at number 22 on the Billboard Country Albums chart.

== Track listing ==
No.	Title	Length
1.	"Prelude: An Appreciation of Life"	0:49
2.	"Until My Voice Passes Out"	4:23
3.	"Heartbeatin'"	3:07
4.	"Texas Women, Tennessee Whiskey"	3:30
5.	"I'm Your Only Flaw"	3:10
6.	"Prelude: Hope & Hesitance"	0:33
7.	"Girl Down in Texas"	3:26
8.	"Whiskey Tango Foxtrot"	2:56
9.	"Kinda Missing You"	3:38
10.	"Heartbeat and a Melody"	3:34
11.	"The Night Is Ours"	3:13
12.	"Dance with You All Night Long"	2:56
13.	"Ain't My Daddy's Town"	3:18
14.	"Epilogue: Farewell Father"	1:03

== Charts ==
Chart (2017)	Peak position
US Billboard 200	141
US Top Country Albums (Billboard)	22
