= Kane Brown (album) =

Studio album by Kane Brown
- Released: December 2, 2016
- Genres: Country; country pop
- Length: 35:55
- Label: RCA Nashville
- Producers: Dann Huff; Matthew McVaney

Kane Brown chronology
Chapter 1 (2016)	Kane Brown (2016)	Experiment (2018)

Singles from Kane Brown
- 1. "Thunder in the Rain" Released: August 22, 2016; 2. "What Ifs" Released: February 6, 2017; 3. "Heaven" Released: November 13, 2017

Kane Brown is the debut studio album by American country music singer Kane Brown. The album was released on December 2, 2016, through RCA Records Nashville. Singles released from the album are "Thunder in the Rain" and "What Ifs". An expanded deluxe edition of the album was released October 6, 2017 featuring four new tracks. The album and songs from the album reached number one simultaneously on all five main Billboard country charts, a first for any artist. "Heaven" was released as the album's first single from the re-release, and third single overall.

== Background ==
Brown co-wrote seven of the eleven tracks in the album. According to Brown, the album is "pretty much autobiography", with songs that detailed his childhood and the hard time he had growing up, "from bullying to being broke to child abuse". For example, "Learning" describes the abuse he suffered at the hands of his stepfather, and the discrimination he faced because of the color of his skin. He collaborated with Lauren Alaina, a friend from high school who had encouraged Brown to sing, on "What Ifs".

The album also features tracks co-written by Chris Young and Florida Georgia Line's Tyler Hubbard and Brian Kelley. The album was produced largely by Dann Huff. Huff originally only intended to produce two tracks for the album, but decided to become more involved after hearing the track "Learning".

== Critical reception ==
The album was generally well received by music critics. Matt Bjorke of Roughstock thought that Brown had crafted a country album that blended "quite a few flavors", judged the second half of Kane Brown to be stronger "with better hooks and lyrics", and overall the album is "a strong mainstream start to an already promising career". Laura Hostelley of Sounds Like Nashville similarly found "the diversity displayed in Brown’s freshman record begins to unravel him and all of the talent that he has to offer", and that the showed "how far Brown has come and the bright future he still has in front of him". Billy Duke of Taste of Country thought Brown "a more convincing storyteller now" and the songs better produced than his previous efforts, and that the album is "a rich, honest collection of songs that introduces a country singer that's going to be around for awhile, with or without radio’s support". Stephen Thomas Erlewine of AllMusic noted the diversity of sounds in the album that blended hip-hop, R&B and country-pop, but felt that while versatile, Brown was "attempting whatever sound that might land him on the charts", nevertheless thought that "there's just enough variety of sounds to keep things interesting and it all goes down smooth."

== Commercial performance ==
The album debuted on the US Billboard 200 at number 10 with 51,000 units, 45,000 of which were pure album sales. It also debuted at number one on the Top Country Albums chart. The album later reached a peak of number five on the Billboard 200 in October 2017 following the release of the deluxe edition with 26,000 copies sold (43,000 units). It also returned to number one on Top Country Albums, and a track "Heaven" from the deluxe edition (for which a video was released) became the best selling digital song. The same week the single from the album "What Ifs" also reached number one on multiple charts, and Brown became the first artist to have simultaneous number ones on all five main country charts – Top Country Albums, Hot Country Songs, Country Airplay, Country Digital Song Sales and Country Streaming Songs.

The album was certified Gold by the RIAA on November 8, 2017, and Platinum on April 4, 2018, It was the fifth best-selling country album of 2017, with 297,800 copies (503,000 album-equivalent units) sold. it has sold 550,200 copies in the United States as of November 2019, and 1,828,000 consumed units including track and streams as of February 2020.

== Track listing ==
No.	Title	Writer(s)	Producer	Length
1.	"Hometown"	Tyler Hubbard; Brian Kelley; James McNair; Cameron Montgomery	Dann Huff	3:23
2.	"What Ifs" (featuring Lauren Alaina)	Kane Brown; Matt McGinn; Jordan Schmidt	Huff	3:08
3.	"Learning"	Brown; Sam Ellis; Shy Carter; Blake Anthony Carter	Huff	3:22
4.	"Thunder in the Rain"	Brown; Josh Hoge; Matthew McVaney	McVaney	2:46
5.	"Pull It Off"	Adam Doleac; Taylor Phillips; Matt Roy	Huff	3:00
6.	"Cold Spot"	Brown; Tom Douglas; Allen Shamblin	Huff	3:38
7.	"Ain't No Stopping Us Now"	Brown; Jamie Paulin; Jordan Schmidt	McVaney	3:03
8.	"Comeback"	Mark Fuhrer; Josh Hoge; McVaney; Chris Young	McVaney	2:46
9.	"Rockstars"	Brock Berryhill; Tommy Cecil; Morgan Wallen	Huff	3:20
10.	"Better Place"	Brown; Chase McGill; Will Weatherly	Huff	3:44
11.	"Granddaddy's Chair"	Brown; Blair Daly; Josh Johnson; Troy Verges	Huff	3:45
Total length:				35:55

Deluxe Edition
No.	Title	Writer(s)	Producer	Length
12.	"Setting the Night on Fire" (with Chris Young)	Brown; Corey Crowder; Hoge; Young	Huff	3:21
13.	"What's Mine Is Yours"	Brown; Sam Ellis; Hoge	Huff	3:36
14.	"Found You"	Brown; Berryhill; Jared Mullins; Phillips	Huff	3:11
15.	"Heaven"	Carter; McGinn; Lindsay Rimes	Huff	2:59

== Personnel ==
- Lauren Alaina - duet vocals on "What Ifs"
- Kane Brown - lead vocals, background vocals
- Joeie Canaday - bass guitar
- Shy Carter - background vocals
- Matt Chamberlain - drums
- Dan Dugmore - steel guitar
- Alex Anthony Faide - electric guitar
- Paul Franklin - steel guitar
- Dann Huff - banjo, bass guitar, bouzouki, dobro, 12-string acoustic guitar, acoustic guitar, electric guitar, mandolin, percussion, piano, programming, slide guitar, synthesizer
- Charlie Judge - keyboards, percussion, programming
- Tony Lucido - bass guitar
- Chris McHugh - drums
- Matthew McVaney - banjo, bass guitar, acoustic guitar, electric guitar, keyboards, percussion, programming, background vocals
- Tony McVaney - electric guitar
- Jimmie Lee Sloas - bass guitar
- Aaron Sterling - drums
- Russell Terrell - background vocals
- Ilya Toshinsky - banjo, 12-string acoustic guitar, acoustic guitar, resonator guitar, ukulele
- Derek Wells - electric guitar
- Chris Young - duet vocals on "Setting the Night on Fire"

== Charts ==
=== Weekly charts ===
Chart (2016–2017)	Peak position
Australian Albums (ARIA)	60
Canadian Albums (Billboard)	25
US Billboard 200	5
US Top Country Albums (Billboard)	1

=== Year-end charts ===
Chart (2017)	Position
US Billboard 200	51
US Top Country Albums (Billboard)	6
Chart (2018)	Position
US Billboard 200	27
US Top Country Albums (Billboard)	2
Chart (2019)	Position
US Billboard 200	78
US Top Country Albums (Billboard)	6
Chart (2020)	Position
US Billboard 200	124
US Top Country Albums (Billboard)	12
Chart (2021)	Position
US Top Country Albums (Billboard)	18
Chart (2022)	Position
US Top Country Albums (Billboard)	31

=== Decade-end charts ===
Chart (2010–2019)	Position
US Billboard 200	151
US Top Country Albums (Billboard)	9

== Certifications ==
Region	Certification	Certified units/sales
Canada (Music Canada)	2× Platinum	160,000^{‡}
United States (RIAA)	3× Platinum	3,000,000^{‡} / 550,200
^{‡} Sales+streaming figures based on certification alone.
