= Experiment (album) =

Studio album by Kane Brown
- Released: November 9, 2018
- Genres: Country; R&B
- Length: 39:19
- Label: RCA Nashville
- Producer: Dann Huff

Kane Brown chronology
Kane Brown (2016)	Experiment (2018)	Mixtape, Vol. 1 (2020)

Singles from Experiment
- 1. "Lose It" Released: June 25, 2018; 2. "Good as You" Released: January 7, 2019; 3. "Homesick" Released: August 5, 2019

Experiment is the second studio album by American country music singer Kane Brown. It was released on November 9, 2018, through RCA Records Nashville. The album includes the single "Lose It" and twelve other songs. Experiment was nominated for American Music Award for Favorite Country Album.

== Content ==
Brown co-wrote all but one track on the album. In advance of the album, the tracks "Homesick", "Short Skirt Weather", and "Good as You" were released digitally. "Lose It" was the album's first radio single. Dann Huff, who co-produced Brown's debut album, is also the producer on Experiment. Brown said that he wanted to introduce new sounds on the album and introduce "more energy" to his style. "American Bad Dream" is a song that Brown wrote about the 2017 Las Vegas shooting. Brown said that he took inspiration from his grandmother, who was a police detective.

== Critical reception ==
Giving it 4 out of 5 stars, Stephen Thomas Erlewine of AllMusic found Brown's singing and songwriting superior to his 2016 debut album, while also noting influences of contemporary R&B and arena rock. Rolling Stone reviewer Maura Johnston rated it 3.5 out of 5 stars, highlighting "American Bad Dream" as the "emotional center" while also noting the variety of musical influences and the "confidence" in Brown's delivery.

== Commercial performance ==
Experiment debuted at number one on the US Billboard 200 with 124,000 album-equivalent units (including 105,000 pure album sales), making it Brown's first US number-one album, and the third country album to top the chart in 2018. The album was certified Gold by the RIAA on March 18, 2019, and Platinum on March 17, 2020. As of March 2020, the album has sold 242,400 copies, with 886,000 units in combined sales, tracks and streams consumed in the United States.

== Track listing ==
All tracks are produced by Dann Huff.

No.	Title	Writer(s)	Length
1.	"Baby Come Back to Me"	Kane Brown; Chase McGill; Matt McGinn; Will Weatherly	3:47
2.	"Good as You"	Brown; Brock Berryhill; Shy Carter; Taylor Phillips; Weatherly	3:12
3.	"Lose It"	Brown; McGill; Weatherly	2:59
4.	"It Ain't You It's Me"	Brown; Berryhill; Josh Hoge; Phillips	3:11
5.	"Short Skirt Weather"	Brown; McGill; Weatherly	3:14
6.	"Homesick"	Brown; Berryhill; McGinn; Phillips	3:25
7.	"Weekend"	Brown; McGill; Weatherly	3:47
8.	"Work"	Brown; Sam Ellis; Hoge	3:06
9.	"One Night Only"	Brown; Corey Crowder; Hoge; McGinn	3:12
10.	"My Where I Come From"	Brown; McGill; McGinn; Weatherly	3:02
11.	"American Bad Dream"	Brown; Ellis; Hoge; McGill	3:18
12.	"Live Forever"	Ellis; Jon Green; Laura Veltz	3:06
Total length:			39:19

Experiment Extended (Digital/Streaming only)
No.	Title	Writer(s)	Length
13.	"Lost in the Middle of Nowhere" (featuring Becky G)	Brown; Jesse Frasure; Jon Nite; Lauren Alaina	3:09
14.	"Like a Rodeo"	Brown; Jordan Schmidt; Jacob Kasher; Derrick Southerland	3:22
15.	"For My Daughter"	Brown; McGill; Tom Douglas	3:44

== Personnel ==
- Kane Brown – lead vocals
- Dann Huff – bouzouki, dobro, electric guitar, gut string guitar, keyboards, piano, programming, sitar, soloist
- Brock Berryhill – programming
- Ben Caver – backing vocals
- Corey Crowder – programming
- Charles Dixon – strings
- Stuart Duncan – fiddle
- Sam Ellis – programming
- Paul Franklin – steel guitar
- Becky G – featured vocals on "Lost in the Middle of Nowhere"
- David Huff – programming
- Charlie Judge – keyboards, programming, string arrangements, synthesizer
- Russ Pahl – steel guitar
- Jimmie Lee Sloas – bass guitar
- Aaron Sterling – drums, tambour
- Russell Terrell – background vocals
- Ilya Toshinsky – banjo, bouzouki, dobro, acoustic guitar, resonator guitar, mandolin
- Will Weatherly – programming
- Derek Wells – electric guitar, slide guitar

== Charts ==
=== Weekly charts ===
Chart (2018)	Peak position
Australian Albums (ARIA)	33
Canadian Albums (Billboard)	17
US Billboard 200	1
US Top Country Albums (Billboard)	1

=== Year-end charts ===
Chart (2019)	Position
Australian Top Country Albums (ARIA)	17
US Billboard 200	42
US Top Country Albums (Billboard)	3
Chart (2020)	Position
Australian Top Country Albums (ARIA)	8
US Billboard 200	112
US Top Country Albums (Billboard)	9
Chart (2021)	Position
Australian Country Albums (ARIA)	18
US Top Country Albums (Billboard)	77

== Certifications ==
Region	Certification	Certified units/sales
Canada (Music Canada)	Platinum	80,000^{‡}
United States (RIAA)	Platinum	1,000,000^{‡}
^{‡} Sales+streaming figures based on certification alone.
