= Undivided =

Single by Tim McGraw and Tyler Hubbard

from the album Here on Earth
- Released: January 13, 2021
- Genre: Country
- Length: 2:56
- Label: Big Machine
- Songwriters: Tyler Hubbard; Chris Loocke
- Producers: Corey Crowder; Byron Gallimore; Tyler Hubbard; Tim McGraw

Tim McGraw singles chronology
"I Called Mama" (2020)	"Undivided" (2021)	"7500 OBO" (2021)

Tyler Hubbard singles chronology
"Undivided" (2021)	"Death Row" (2022)

"Undivided" is a song recorded by American country music singers Tim McGraw and Tyler Hubbard, the latter of whom is one-half of Florida Georgia Line. The song, which Hubbard wrote with Chris Loocke, was released on January 13, 2021, and is on the deluxe version of McGraw's album Here on Earth. The song is the album's second single. This marks McGraw and Hubbard's second collaboration after 2016's "May We All".

== Content ==
Tyler Hubbard, who is one-half of the duo Florida Georgia Line, wrote the song with Chris Loocke in 2020. He said that he wrote the song in November 2020 while under quarantine during the COVID-19 pandemic.

According to Tim McGraw, Hubbard sent him the song months before the 2021 storming of the United States Capitol. McGraw and Hubbard produced the track along with McGraw's longtime producer Byron Gallimore and Florida Georgia Line's producer, Corey Crowder.

Billy Dukes of Taste of Country describes the song as a "peppy, pop-friendly country bop simply asks us to treat our neighbors with decency and kindness." The song has a central theme of unity among those with differing viewpoints.

McGraw and Hubbard performed the song live at the inauguration ceremony for Joe Biden as the 46th President of the United States.

== Charts ==
=== Weekly charts ===
Weekly chart performance for "Undivided"
Chart (2021)	Peak position
Australia Country Hot 50 (TMN)	15
Canada Hot 100 (Billboard)	66
Canada Country (Billboard)	4
US Billboard Hot 100	76
US Country Airplay (Billboard)	16
US Hot Country Songs (Billboard)	23

=== Year-end charts ===
Year-end chart performance for "Undivided"
Chart (2021)	Position
US Country Airplay (Billboard)	52
US Hot Country Songs (Billboard)	64

== Certifications ==
Certifications for "Undivided"
Region	Certification	Certified units/sales
Canada (Music Canada)	Gold	40,000^{‡}
^{‡} Sales+streaming figures based on certification alone.
