= 7500 OBO =

2021 single by Tim McGraw

Single by Tim McGraw

from the album Here on Earth
- Released: August 2, 2021
- Genre: Country
- Length: 3:41
- Label: Big Machine
- Songwriter(s): Nathan Spicer; Matt McGinn; Jennifer Schott
- Producer(s): Byron Gallimore; Tim McGraw

Tim McGraw singles chronology
"Undivided" (2021)	"7500 OBO" (2021)	"Standing Room Only" (2023)

Music video
- "7500 OBO on YouTube

"7500 OBO" is a song by American country music singer Tim McGraw. It was released on August 2, 2021, as the third single from his sixteenth studio album Here on Earth. The song was written by Nathan Spicer, Matt McGinn and Jennifer Schott, and produced by Byron Gallimore and McGraw.

== Background and content ==
"7500 OBO" is a song about McGraw's pickup truck that he wants to sell because it, according to Clayton Edwards of Outsider, "holds too many memories. All he can think about when he turns the key is his ex in the passenger seat." Robin Palmer, a chief creative officer of SmackSongs, who passed the song to McGraw, told Billboard: "It tells a story, it's just a really good country song. It happens to have a modern cadence and sort of a modern approach to it." McGraw said that the song "feel[s] like your right wrist hanging over the steering wheel and your elbow hanging off the window kind of thing. It comes back to the car." 7500 refers to the truck's asking price, while the OBO stands for "or best offer".

The song references several of McGraw's singles, more prominently the 1998 number one hit "Where the Green Grass Grows" (in which the fiddle riff of the song is sampled throughout portions of the single). The song also includes references to his other singles "Shotgun Rider" and "Let it Go."

== Music video ==
The music video was released on August 13, 2021, and directed by Alexa and Stephen Kinigopoulos. McGraw's youngest daughter Audrey has her first acting role in the video. It depicts a relationship about "a young woman with a boyfriend who eventually leaves town". The couple's story is shown "from the truck's backseat: sometimes through the windshield, with the couple kissing, dining and even fighting in the front of the cab".

== Other versions ==
On October 8, 2021, McGraw released the track's acoustic version.

== Charts ==
=== Weekly charts ===
Weekly chart performance for "7500 OBO"
Chart (2021–2022)	Peak position
Canada (Canadian Hot 100)	57
Canada Country (Billboard)	6
US Billboard Hot 100	66
US Country Airplay (Billboard)	4
US Hot Country Songs (Billboard)	15

=== Year-end charts ===
2022 year-end chart performance for "7500 OBO"
Chart (2022)	Position
US Country Airplay (Billboard)	19
US Hot Country Songs (Billboard)	53

== Certifications ==
Certifications for "7500 OBO"
Region	Certification	Certified units/sales
Canada (Music Canada)	Platinum	80,000^{‡}
United States (RIAA)	Gold	500,000^{‡}
^{‡} Sales+streaming figures based on certification alone.

== Release history ==
Release history and versions for "7500 OBO"
Region	Date	Format	Label	Version	Ref.
Various	August 21, 2020	Digital download; streaming	Big Machine	Original	
United States	August 2, 2021	Country radio	Big Machine	Original	
Various	October 8, 2021	Digital download; streaming	Big Machine	Acoustic	
