= I Called Mama =

Single by Tim McGraw

from the album Here on Earth
- Released: May 8, 2020
- Genre: Country
- Length: 3:31
- Label: Big Machine
- Songwriter(s): Marv Green; Lance Miller; Jimmy Yeary
- Producer(s): Tim McGraw; Byron Gallimore

Tim McGraw singles chronology
"Thought About You" (2019)	"I Called Mama" (2020)	"Undivided" (2021)

"I Called Mama" is a song recorded by American country music artist Tim McGraw. It was released in May 2020 as the lead-off single to his sixteenth studio album Here on Earth, and is his first single since returning to Big Machine Records earlier in the year.

== Content ==
"I Called Mama" was written by Marv Green, Lance Miller, and Jimmy Yeary. Released just before Mother's Day, the song is described as "a gently ebbing ballad led by acoustic guitar and washes of pedal steel [...] about not putting things off until it's too late", which leads to a phone call home to the narrator's mother. McGraw originally expected the song to just remain an album cut, but in the wake of the COVID-19 pandemic, he felt the song took on a new meaning: "There was a lot of carrying a lot of weight along with it, and as you listen to it and you think about the personal level, but that's something that's sort of existential in a way that speaks to things that are going on outside of what the song is saying, and to have a personal song that's something that big when you look at it from a different perspective when the world changed, it was hard to ignore. It was hard to not want to pay attention to the song being, for me, a sort of catharsis during this time".

== Music video ==
The music video premiered on May 27, 2020, and is "a tribute to mothers everywhere" with clips of McGraw's fans and their mothers, as well as appearances by his own mother, Betty Trimble, and wife, Faith Hill.

== Chart performance ==
"I Called Mama" debuted on Billboard Country Airplay at No. 20 for the chart dated May 11, 2020, his third top 20 debut on the chart. It also debuted at No. 99 on the Billboard Hot 100 for the chart dated July 11, 2020.

== Charts ==
=== Weekly charts ===
Chart (2020)	Peak position
Canada (Canadian Hot 100)	77
Canada Country (Billboard)	2
US Billboard Hot 100	53
US Adult Contemporary (Billboard)	23
US Country Airplay (Billboard)	2
US Hot Country Songs (Billboard)	8

=== Year-end charts ===
Chart (2020)	Position
US Country Airplay (Billboard)	38
US Hot Country Songs (Billboard)	39

== Certifications ==
Region	Certification	Certified units/sales
United States (RIAA)	Gold	500,000^{‡}
^{‡} Sales+streaming figures based on certification alone.
