= Heaven (Kane Brown song) =

Single by Kane Brown

Single by Kane Brown

from the album Kane Brown
- Released: November 13, 2017
- Genre: Country; R&B
- Length: 2:57
- Label: RCA Nashville
- Songwriters: Shy Carter; Matt McGinn; Lindsay Rimes
- Producer: Dann Huff

Kane Brown singles chronology
"What Ifs" (2017)	"Heaven" (2017)	"Lose It" (2018)

"Heaven" is a song recorded by American country music singer Kane Brown for the re-release of his self-titled debut album on October 6, 2017. It was released as the third single from the album on November 13, 2017.

== Background ==
The song was written by Shy Carter, Matt McGinn, and Lindsay Rimes. Billboard described it as a "romantic slow jam." Kane Brown first discovered the song at a writer's retreat where he heard it from through the floor while he was working on another song ("What's Mine Is Yours") upstairs. He decided to cut it because it instantly reminded him of his fiancée.

== Composition ==
The song is in the key of A major with a moderately slow tempo of approximately 80 beats per minute. It follows the chord progression D-A-F♯m-E. Brown's vocals range from F♯_{2}-F♯_{4}.

== Chart performance ==
"Heaven" reached number one on the US Country Airplay chart dated May 19, 2018, becoming Brown's second number one on the chart. It also reached number two on the US Hot Country Songs chart. As of April 2019, the single sold 722,000 copies in the US. On December 7, 2023, the single was certified Diamond by the Recording Industry Association of America (RIAA) for combined sales and streaming equivalent units of over ten million units in the United States, his first single to achieve this milestone.

== Music video ==
The music video for "Heaven" was directed by Alex Alvga and released on October 6, 2017. In it, Brown performs the song in a white T-shirt and jeans alone at a microphone stand in a room lit with an assortment of candles.

== Charts ==
=== Weekly charts ===
Chart (2017–2018)	Peak position
Canada (Canadian Hot 100)	33
Canada Country (Billboard)	1
US Billboard Hot 100	15
US Country Airplay (Billboard)	1
US Hot Country Songs (Billboard)	2

=== Year-end charts ===
Chart (2018)	Position
Canada (Canadian Hot 100)	93
US Billboard Hot 100	53
US Country Airplay (Billboard)	1
US Hot Country Songs (Billboard)	2

=== Decade-end charts ===
Chart (2010–2019)	Position
US Hot Country Songs (Billboard)	12

== Certifications ==
Region	Certification	Certified units/sales
Australia (ARIA)	3× Platinum	210,000^{‡}
Canada (Music Canada)	8× Platinum	640,000^{‡}
New Zealand (RMNZ)	Platinum	30,000^{‡}
United Kingdom (BPI)	Silver	200,000^{‡}
United States (RIAA)	11× Platinum	11,000,000^{‡}
^{‡} Sales+streaming figures based on certification alone.

== See also ==
- List of highest-certified digital singles in the United States
