= Front Row Seat =

Studio album by Josh Abbott Band
- Released: November 6, 2015
- Genre: Country
- Label: Pretty Damn Tough, Reviver

Josh Abbott Band chronology
Small Town Family Dream (2012)	Front Row Seat (2015)	Until My Voice Goes Out (2017)

Front Row Seat is the fourth studio album by country band Josh Abbott Band. It was released on November 6, 2015 via Pretty Damn Tough and Reviver. It peaked at number 9 on the Billboard Country Albums chart.

It was described by The Country Note as being "extremely personal" and "a masterpiece in storytelling."
