= Kane Brown =

American country singer and songwriter (born 1993)

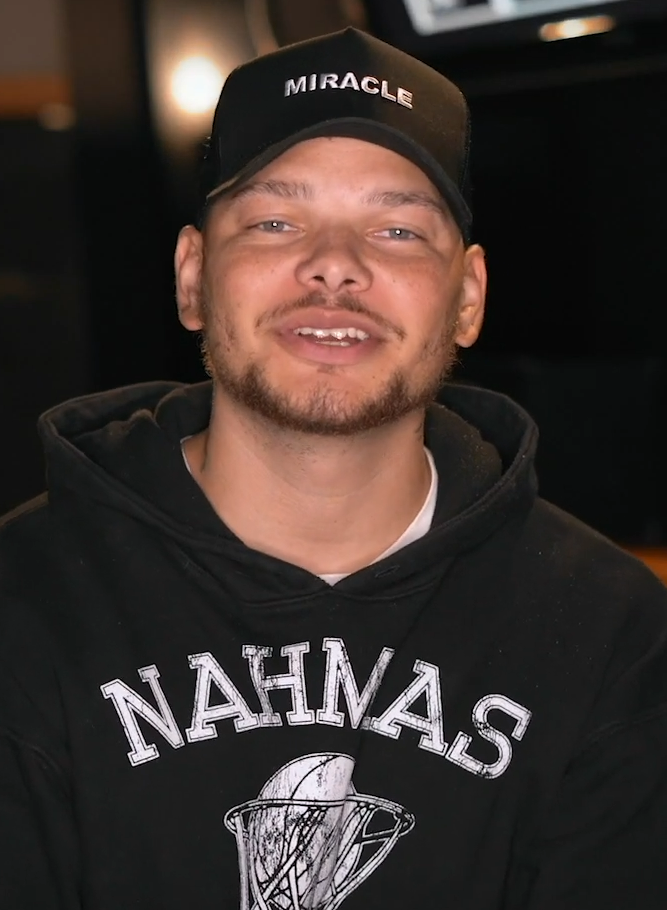
- Brown in 2021

Background information
- Born: Kane Allen Brown; October 21, 1993 (age 33); Chattanooga, Tennessee, U.S.
- Origin: Whites Creek, Tennessee, U.S.
- Genres: Country; R&B; pop
- Occupations: Singer; songwriter
- Instruments: Vocals, guitar, keyboards
- Years active: 2014–present
- Labels: Zone 4; RCA Nashville
- Spouse: Katelyn Jae (m. 2018)
- Children: 3
- Website: kanebrownmusic.com

Kane Allen Brown (born October 21, 1993) is an American country singer and songwriter. First garnering a mass following on social media, he released his debut extended play (EP) Closer in June 2015, and followed it up with the single, "Used to Love You Sober" in October of that year. After Brown signed with RCA Nashville in early 2016, the song was included on his second EP and major label debut, Chapter 1 in March 2016. He released his eponymous debut studio album later that year in December. The album spawned the single "What Ifs" (featuring Lauren Alaina), and in October 2017, Brown became the first artist to have simultaneous number ones on all five main Billboard country charts. Brown released his second album, Experiment, in November 2018, which became his first number one album on the Billboard 200.

== Early life ==
Brown was raised in rural northwest Georgia and in the Chattanooga, Tennessee, area. He is biracial, with a white mother, Tabatha Brown and an African-American father who is also part Cherokee. In 2018, he told People magazine he did not know he was biracial until he was 7 or 8 years old: "I thought I was full white... I found out that I was biracial, and I still wasn't thinking anything of it, but then I started getting called the N-word ... I learned what it meant, and that's when it started affecting me. I got in fights over it when I was little." His father has been incarcerated since 1996, and he was raised by his single mother.

Sometimes homeless, Brown's family moved around northwest Georgia when he was younger from Rossville to Fort Oglethorpe to LaFayette before finally settling in Red Bank, Tennessee. As a result, he attended many schools, among them Lakeview Fort Oglethorpe High School in Fort Oglethorpe, where he sang in the choir with Lauren Alaina, the runner-up on Season 10 of American Idol. He also attended Red Bank, Ridgeland, and Soddy Daisy High School. After graduation, he lived with his grandmother, who had also helped raise him.

Brown grew up listening to country music but became interested in R&B music in middle school. However, after almost winning a school talent show in 11th grade with a rendition of Chris Young's "Gettin' You Home", he began to perform country music. He auditioned for both American Idol and The X Factor USA after the success of his school friend Lauren Alaina on American Idol. He was chosen for The X Factor USA after an audition in 2013 but left the show when its producers wanted to include him in a boy band. After that, he decided to post his cover versions of popular songs online.

== Career ==
In 2014, Brown began posting videos of his covers of songs by Brantley Gilbert, Billy Currington, Alan Jackson, and other singers on social media. He acquired a following for his homemade videos on Facebook. His cover of Lee Brice's "I Don't Dance" was one early video that gained wide attention. Released on September 30, 2015, his cover of George Strait's "Check Yes or No" went viral and received more than seven million views. His number of followers on Facebook quickly reached more than a million, leading to a teaser clip for his own single "Used to Love You Sober" hitting one million views in less than three hours upon its release on October 8, 2015, and then reaching more than 11 million views in two weeks.

Brown was initially signed to Zone 4 with Jay Frank as his first manager. Martha Earls became his manager in 2016.

=== 2014: Closer ===
In 2014, Brown raised funds via crowdfunding site Kickstarter to produce a six-song EP, which he recorded in Nashville, Tennessee, at the home studio of Noah Henson, guitarist for Brantley Gilbert. The EP, titled Closer, was released on June 2, 2015, and debuted on the Top Country Albums chart at number 22, selling 3,200 copies in its debut week. A single from the EP, "Don't Go City on Me", was first released on October 22, 2014, and reached number 43 on the Country Digital Songs chart.

=== 2015: "Used to Love You Sober" and follow-up singles ===
Brown released a new single "Used to Love You Sober" on his birthday (October 21) in 2015, and the song was spotlighted on Zane Lowe's Beats 1. It reached number two on the Country Digital Songs chart based on just two days of sales, with 38,000 copies sold. The release of the single also pushed his EP Closer up the chart to number 22 on the Top Album Sales chart. A second song, "Last Minute Late Night", was released on November 4, 2015, and debuted on the Country Digital Songs chart at number nine, with 26,000 copies sold. Another single, "I Love That I Hate You", followed three weeks later on November 30, 2015, and sold 17,000 copies in the first week.

=== 2016–2018: Chapter 1 and Kane Brown ===
Brown opened for Florida Georgia Line on their summer 2016 Dig Your Roots Tour and collaborated with Chandler Stephens on a song they wrote together, "Can't Stop Love", which released on February 12, 2016.

He signed with Sony Music Nashville on January 27, 2016, and records under the RCA Nashville label. His first EP under the label, titled Chapter 1, released on March 18, 2016. It includes the singles "Used to Love You Sober" and "Last Minute Late Night" and debuted at number nine on the U.S. Billboard 200 and at number three on the Top Country Albums chart, selling 30,000 units (23,000 in traditional albums) in its first week.

On June 17, 2016, "Ain't No Stopping Us Now" was released as a promotional single ahead of his debut full-length album. "Thunder in the Rain" was released as the debut radio single from the album on August 3, 2016, and Brown headlined his own Ain't No Stopping Us Now Tour produced by Monster Energy and Outbreak Presents starting on November 3, 2016. The self-titled album featuring those songs was released on December 2, 2016, and debuted at number 10 on the U.S. Billboard 200. "What Ifs", recorded with his friend Lauren Alaina, was released as the second single from the album and has been certified 8× Platinum by the RIAA. It became a number one hit on the Billboard Country Airplay charts for the week of October 28, 2017, the first for Brown and the second for Alaina. It also spent five weeks at number one on the Billboard Hot Country Songs chart.

An expanded deluxe edition of Brown's debut album was released October 6, 2017, featuring four new tracks, including a duet with Chris Young and "Heaven", released as the album's third single on November 13, 2017. Upon the release of the deluxe edition, the album went to number five on the Billboard 200 and returned to number one on the Top Country Albums chart. With the single "What Ifs", which reached number one on multiple charts, and the new song "Heaven" released with the deluxe edition, Brown became the first artist to have simultaneous number ones on all five main country charts: Top Country Albums, Hot Country Songs, Country Airplay, Country Digital Song Sales, and Country Streaming Songs.

=== 2018–2019: Experiment and collaborations ===
On June 7, 2018, RCA Nashville released "Lose It" as the lead single for his second RCA album. A second track from the album, "Weekend", was released on August 8, 2018. On September 4, 2018, Brown announced the album's title, Experiment, via Twitter along with its cover art and news of the upcoming track "Homesick". Experiment was released on November 9, 2018 and became Brown's first No. 1 on the Billboard 200 albums chart.

Over the course of 2018–19, Brown released several collaborations with artists such as Becky G, Camila Cabello, and Digital Farm Animals, including a remix of "Saturday Nights" with R&B singer Khalid which was released as a single. He also appeared on Brooks & Dunn's album Reboot in a new rendition of their past hit "Believe". In August 2019, Brown collaborated with Marshmello for "One Thing Right", his first release to Mainstream Pop Radio.

In October 2019, Brown's drummer, Kenny Dixon, died in a car accident.

=== 2020–2024: Mixtape, Vol. 1 and Different Man ===
In April 2020, Brown released the track "Cool Again", the debut single off his third EP, Mixtape, Vol. 1 (EP).

In June 2020, Brown released the song "Worldwide Beautiful", which aims to highlight peace and equality and benefits the Boys & Girls Club of America. In July 2020, Brown released his second single to pop radio, "Be Like That" with Khalid and Swae Lee, another single off his EP.

On August 14, 2020, Brown released his third EP, Mixtape, Vol. 1, which includes "Cool Again", "Worldwide Beautiful", and "Be Like That", as well as four other tracks.

In September 2020, Brown announced a drive-in concert, held at more than 200 theaters across the U.S. on September 26, 2020. That same week Brown appeared on stage at the iHeartRadio Music Festival in a PORTL "hologram" machine to sing "Be Like That" live from Nashville with Swae Lee and Khalid who were in the studio in Los Angeles, California.

In October 2020, "Worship You" was sent to country radio as his second official single to that format off the EP.

On November 26, 2020, Brown performed in a pre-recorded halftime show in the Thanksgiving Thursday Night Football game between the Washington Commanders and the Dallas Cowboys at AT&T Stadium. On February 11, 2021, Brown launched his own label, 1021 Entertainment, in association with Sony Nashville.

Also in 2021, Brown became the first black person to win Video of the Year at the ACM Awards, which he won for "Worldwide Beautiful". He was included in 2021's Time 100, Time's annual list of the 100 most influential people in the world.

On March 3, 2022, Brown released the song "Leave You Alone", which he initially previewed on social media in late 2021.

Brown announced his third studio album, Different Man, on July 18, 2022. The album was released on September 9, 2022. The song "Thank God", recorded with his wife Katelyn Brown, was released from the album. It reached number one on the Country Airplay chart in February 2023, making it the second duet by a married couple to top the chart, following Tim McGraw and Faith Hill's "It's Your Love" in 1997.

=== 2024–present: The High Road ===
On October 9, 2024, Brown announced his fourth album, The High Road. It was released on January 24, 2025. The single "Miles on It", a collaboration with Marshmello, became one of his most successful single, reaching No. 1 on the Hot Dance/Electronic Songs and No. 4 on the Hot Country Songs chart on its debut.

He became an actor after joining The Token Groomsman as Scott's best friend, Neil.

== Personal life ==
Brown is married to Katelyn Brown (née Jae), who is also a singer. He proposed to her on Easter Sunday in 2017 and announced their engagement during a concert in Philadelphia, Pennsylvania, a short time later in April 2017. They were married at Mint Springs Farm in Nolensville, Tennessee, on October 12, 2018, with about 200 relatives and friends in attendance. On April 15, 2019, Brown announced they were expecting their first child. Less than a month later, on May 1, 2019, he revealed the baby was a girl during a walk down the red carpet at the Billboard Music Awards. On October 29, 2019, Jae gave birth to their first child, a daughter. On December 31, 2021, Brown announced that Jae had given birth to their second daughter a day prior. On June 18, 2024, the couple welcomed their third child and first son.

== Tours ==
- Dig Your Roots Tour (2016) [Opening for Florida Georgia Line]
- Ain't No Stopping Us Now Tour (2016–2017)
- Hometown Proud Tour (2017)
- They Don't Know Tour (2017) [Opening for Jason Aldean]
- Losing Sleep World Tour (2018) [Opening for Chris Young]
- Live Forever Tour (2018–2019)
- Ride All Night Tour (2019) [Opening for Jason Aldean]
- The Worldwide Beautiful Tour (2020–2021)
- Blessed & Free Tour (2021–2022)
- Drunk or Dreamin' Tour (2022–2023)
- In the Air Tour (2024)
- The High Road Tour (2025)

== Discography ==
- Kane Brown (2016)
- Experiment (2018)
- Different Man (2022)
- The High Road (2025)

== Awards and nominations ==
Award	Year	Category	Work	Result	Ref.
Academy of Country Music Awards	2017	New Male Vocalist of the Year	Himself	Nominated	
Academy of Country Music Awards	2018	New Male Vocalist of the Year	Himself	Nominated	
Academy of Country Music Awards	2018	Vocal Event of the Year	"What Ifs" (with Lauren Alaina)	Nominated	
Academy of Country Music Awards	2019	Single of the Year	"Heaven"	Nominated	
Academy of Country Music Awards	2021	Album of the Year	Mixtape, Vol. 1	Nominated	
Academy of Country Music Awards	2021	Video of the Year	”Worldwide Beautiful”	Won	
Academy of Country Music Awards	2022	Single of the Year	"Famous Friends" (with Chris Young)	Nominated	
Academy of Country Music Awards	2022	Music Event of the Year	"Famous Friends" (with Chris Young)	Nominated	
Academy of Country Music Awards	2022	Video of the Year	"Famous Friends" (with Chris Young)	Nominated	
Academy of Country Music Awards	2023	Single of the Year	"Thank God" (with Katelyn Brown)	Nominated	
Academy of Country Music Awards	2023	Visual media of the year	"Thank God" (with Katelyn Brown)	Nominated	
Academy of Country Music Awards	2023	Music event of the year	"Thank God" (with Katelyn Brown)	Nominated	
Academy of Country Music Awards	2023	Entertainer of the year	Himself	Nominated	
Academy of Country Music Awards	2023	Male artist of the year	Himself	Nominated	
Academy of Country Music Awards	2024	Entertainer of the year	Himself	Nominated	
American Music Awards	2018	Favorite Country Male Artist	Himself	Won	
American Music Awards	2018	Favorite Country Album	Kane Brown	Won	
American Music Awards	2018	Favorite Country Song	"Heaven"	Won	
American Music Awards	2019	Favorite Country Male Artist	Himself	Won	
American Music Awards	2019	Favorite Country Album	Experiment	Nominated	
American Music Awards	2020	Favorite Country Male Artist	Himself	Won	
American Music Awards	2021	Favorite Country Song	"Famous Friends" (with Chris Young)	Nominated	
American Music Awards	2025	Collaboration of the Year	"Miles on It" (with Marshmello)	Nominated	
Billboard Music Awards	2018	Top Country Artist	Himself	Nominated	
Billboard Music Awards	2018	Top Country Album	Kane Brown	Nominated	
Billboard Music Awards	2018	Top Country Song	"What Ifs" (with Lauren Alaina)	Nominated	
Billboard Music Awards	2019	Top Country Artist	Himself	Nominated	
Billboard Music Awards	2019	Top Country Male Artist	Himself	Nominated	
Billboard Music Awards	2019	Top Country Album	Kane Brown	Nominated	
Billboard Music Awards	2019	Top Country Song	"Heaven"	Nominated	
Billboard Music Awards	2020	Top Country Artist	Himself	Nominated	
Billboard Music Awards	2020	Top Country Male Artist	Himself	Nominated	
Billboard Music Awards	2020	Top Country Album	Experiment	Nominated	
Billboard Music Awards	2021	Top Country Artist	Himself	Nominated	
Billboard Music Awards	2024	Top Dance/Electronic Song	"Miles on It" (with Marshmello)	Nominated	
Country Music Association Awards	2021	Single of the Year	"Famous Friends" (with Chris Young)	Nominated	
Country Music Association Awards	2021	Musical Event of the Year	"Famous Friends" (with Chris Young)	Nominated	
Country Music Association Awards	2021	Video of the Year	"Famous Friends" (with Chris Young)	Nominated	
Country Music Association Awards	2023	Musical Event of the Year	"Thank God" (with Katelyn Brown)	Nominated	
CMT Music Awards	2017	Breakthrough Video of the Year	"Used to Love You Sober"	Nominated	
CMT Music Awards	2018	Collaborative Video of the Year	"What Ifs" (feat. Lauren Alaina)	Won	
CMT Music Awards	2018	Video of the Year	"What Ifs" (feat. Lauren Alaina)	Nominated	
CMT Music Awards	2019	Video of the Year	"Good as You"	Nominated	
CMT Music Awards	2019	Male Video of the Year	"Lose It"	Won	
CMT Music Awards	2020	Collaborative Video of the Year	"Cool Again" (feat. Nelly)	Nominated	
CMT Music Awards	2020	Collaborative Video of the Year	"One Thing Right" (feat. Marshmello)	Nominated	
CMT Music Awards	2021	Video of the Year	"Worldwide Beautiful"	Nominated	
CMT Music Awards	2021	Male Video of the Year	"Worship You"	Won	
CMT Music Awards	2021	Best Family Feature	"Worship You"	Nominated	
CMT Music Awards	2021	Collaborative Video of the Year	"Famous Friends" (feat. Chris Young)	Won	
CMT Music Awards	2022	Video of the Year	"One Mississippi"	Nominated	
CMT Music Awards	2022	Male Video of the Year	"One Mississippi"	Nominated	
CMT Music Awards	2022	CMT Performance of the Year	"Three Wooden Crosses" (From 2021 CMT Artist of the Year)	Nominated	
CMT Music Awards	2022	CMT Performance of the Year	"Ride wit Me" (From CMT Crossroads)	Nominated	
CMT Music Awards	2023	Video of the Year	"Thank God" (with Katelyn Brown)	Won	
CMT Music Awards	2023	Collaborative Video of the Year	"Thank God" (with Katelyn Brown)	Nominated	
CMT Music Awards	2023	Male Video of the Year	"Like I Love Country Music"	Nominated	
CMT Music Awards	2024	Video of the Year	"Nothing Compares to You" (with Mickey Guyton)	Nominated	
CMT Music Awards	2024	Collaborative Video of the Year	"Nothing Compares to You" (with Mickey Guyton)	Nominated	
iHeartRadio Music Awards	2019	Country Song of the Year	"Heaven"	Nominated	
iHeartRadio Music Awards	2022	Country Song of the Year	"Famous Friends"	Nominated	
iHeartRadio Music Awards	2023	Country Artist of the Year	Himself	Nominated	
iHeartRadio Music Awards	2024	Best Collaboration	"Thank God" (with Katelyn Brown)	Nominated	
iHeartRadio Music Awards	2024	Country Song of the Year	"Thank God" (with Katelyn Brown)	Nominated	
People's Choice Awards	2019	The Male Country Artist of the Year	Himself	Nominated	
People's Choice Awards	2020	The Male Country Artist of the Year	Himself	Nominated	
People's Choice Awards	2020	The Soundtrack Song of the Year	"On Me"	Nominated	
People's Choice Awards	2022	The Male Country Artist of the Year	Himself	Nominated	
People's Choice Awards	2023	The Male Country Artist of the Year	Himself	Nominated	
People's Choice Awards	2024	The Male Country Artist of the Year	Himself	Nominated	
People's Choice Country Awards	2023	The People’s Artist of the Year	Himself	Nominated	
People's Choice Country Awards	2023	The Male Artist of the Year	Himself	Nominated	
People's Choice Country Awards	2023	The Album of the Year	Different Man	Nominated	
People's Choice Country Awards	2023	The Collaboration Song of the Year	"Thank God"	Nominated	
People's Choice Country Awards	2023	The Song of the Year	"Thank God"	Nominated	
People's Choice Country Awards	2023	The Music Video of the Year	"Thank God"	Nominated	
Taste of Country Fan Choice Awards	2018	Most Passionate Fanbase of 2018	Himself	Won	
Taste of Country Fan Choice Awards	2018	Most Jaw-Dropping Performance of 2018	"What Ifs" (with Lauren Alaina) at the ACMs	Won	
Taste of Country Fan Choice Awards	2018	Best Country Album	Experiment	Won	
Teen Choice Awards	2019	Choice Country Artist	Himself	Nominated	
Teen Choice Awards	2019	Choice Country Song	“Good as You”	Nominated	

== Filmography ==
Television Appearances
Year	Title	Role	Notes
2019	Ridiculousness	Himself/Guest	
2019	All That	Himself/Musical Guest	Episode 1103
2020	The Voice	Himself/Battle Advisor	Season 19 of Team Blake
2020–present	CMT Music Awards	Himself/Co-Host	2020: With Sarah Hyland & Ashley McBryde; 2021, 2023–present: With Kelsea Ballerini; 2022: With Anthony Mackie & Kelsea Ballerini
2021	CMT Crossroads	Himself	
2022	Barmageddon	Himself/Guest	Episode: "Blake Shelton & Kane Brown"
2023	Fire Country	Robin	Episode: "Off the Rails"
2025	9-1-1: Nashville	Himself	Episode: Pilot
