= Be Like That (Kane Brown, Swae Lee and Khalid song) =

2020 single by Kane Brown, Swae Lee and Khalid

Single by Kane Brown, Swae Lee and Khalid

from the EP Mixtape, Vol. 1
- Released: July 10, 2020
- Genre: Hip hop; pop; country pop
- Length: 3:11
- Label: RCA Nashville
- Songwriter(s): Kane Brown; Swae Lee; Khalid; Alexander Izquierdo; Michael Len Williams II; Charlie Handsome
- Producer(s): Charlie Handsome

Kane Brown singles chronology
"Worldwide Beautiful" (2020)	"Be Like That" (2020)	"Worship You" (2020)

Swae Lee singles chronology
"Reality Check" (2020)	"Be Like That" (2020)	"Thrusting" (2020)

Khalid singles chronology
"Experience" (2020)	"Be Like That" (2020)	"So Done" (2020)

Music video
- "Be Like That" on YouTube

"Be Like That" is a song by American musicians Kane Brown, Swae Lee, and Khalid. It was released on July 10, 2020, through RCA Records Nashville as the third single from Brown's third EP Mixtape, Vol. 1.

== Background and composition ==
Brown discussed the song's meaning in a statement to Billboard, saying: "It's about all the different feelings you can have in a relationship. And trying not to overthink it." "Be Like That" mixes country with "infectious" pop and hip-hop elements.

== Music video ==
The lyric video was uploaded on July 10, 2020. The official music video was released on August 19, 2020, and was directed by Alex Alvga. Being set in the 1940s, it features the three singers taking over the Pink Motel in Sun Valley, California and showcasing a classic diner, as well as an empty pool with vintage TVs.

== Personnel ==
Credits adapted from YouTube and Tidal.

- Charlie Handsome – Producer
- Denis Kosiak – Mixing
- Khalif Brown – Songwriting
- Alexander Izquierdo – Songwriting
- James Keely – Engineering
- Khalid Robinson – Songwriting
- Randy Lanphear – Producer / Vocal Producer
- Michael Piroli – Engineering
- Kuk Harrell – Producer / Vocal Producer
- Ryan Vojtesak – Producer / Songwriting
- Jeff Braun – Engineering / Vocal Engineering
- Mike Will – Producer / Songwriting
- Dale Becker – Mastering
- Hector Vega - Mastering

== Charts ==
=== Weekly charts ===
Chart (2020)	Peak position
Australia (ARIA)	53
Canada (Canadian Hot 100)	6
Canada AC (Billboard)	31
Canada CHR/Top 40 (Billboard)	1
Canada Hot AC (Billboard)	5
Global 200 (Billboard)	44
US Billboard Hot 100	19
US Adult Pop Airplay (Billboard)	11
US Pop Airplay (Billboard)	8
US Rolling Stone Top 100	17

=== Year-end charts ===
Chart (2020)	Position
Canada (Canadian Hot 100)	55
US Billboard Hot 100	88
US Adult Top 40 (Billboard)	45
US Mainstream Top 40 (Billboard)	38

Chart (2021)	Position
Canada (Canadian Hot 100)	55

== Certifications ==
Region	Certification	Certified units/sales
Australia (ARIA)	Gold	35,000^{‡}
Brazil (Pro-Música Brasil)	Gold	20,000^{‡}
Canada (Music Canada)	6× Platinum	480,000^{‡}
New Zealand (RMNZ)	Platinum	30,000^{‡}
United Kingdom (BPI)	Silver	200,000^{‡}
United States (RIAA)	4× Platinum	4,000,000^{‡}
^{‡} Sales+streaming figures based on certification alone.
