= Lose It (Kane Brown song) =

Single by Kane Brown

from the album Experiment
- Released: June 25, 2018
- Genre: Country
- Length: 3:01
- Label: RCA Nashville
- Songwriters: Kane Brown; Chase McGill; Will Weatherly
- Producer: Dann Huff

Kane Brown singles chronology
"Heaven" (2018)	"Lose It" (2018)	"Good as You" (2019)

"Lose It" is a song co-written and recorded by American country music singer Kane Brown. It is the lead single to his second major-label album Experiment. Brown wrote the song with Chase McGill and Will Weatherly.

== Content ==
Brown said of the song, "I fell in love with this song, it was really exciting, it was really uptempo. It’s one of my favorite songs, so I hope you enjoy it." Brown officially released the single in June 2018, following an Instagram post he made in March that featured him dancing to the song's chorus with his dog. He also noted that the song was an example of wanting to bring new sounds to his music, highlighting in particular that it is his first song to contain a fiddle. The song is about the emotions felt around the narrator's lover, saying that he "lose[s] it" in her presence. Of the lyrics, The Boot writer Liv Stecker said that "the first verse launches, coaching a romantic prospect to offload distractions. The lyrical theme switches in the chorus, as Brown admits that he's the one losing it, when she's all in."

The song's video features Brown performing in the desert.

== Commercial performance ==
As of January 2019, the song has sold 194,000 copies in the US. On December 7, 2023, the single was certified three-times Platinum by the Recording Industry Association of America (RIAA) for combined sales and streaming equivalent units of over three million units in the United States.

== Charts ==
=== Weekly charts ===
Chart (2018)	Peak position
Canada (Canadian Hot 100)	63
Canada Country (Billboard)	1
US Billboard Hot 100	28
US Country Airplay (Billboard)	1
US Hot Country Songs (Billboard)	1

=== Year-end charts ===
Chart (2018)	Position
US Country Airplay (Billboard)	48
US Hot Country Songs (Billboard)	21
Chart (2019)	Position
US Country Airplay (Billboard)	52
US Hot Country Songs (Billboard)	51

== Certifications ==
Region	Certification	Certified units/sales
Australia (ARIA)	Gold	35,000^{‡}
Canada (Music Canada)	2× Platinum	160,000^{‡}
United States (RIAA)	3× Platinum	3,000,000^{‡}
^{‡} Sales+streaming figures based on certification alone.
