= Worship You =

2020 single by Kane Brown

Single by Kane Brown

from the EP Mixtape, Vol. 1
- Released: October 26, 2020
- Genre: Country
- Length: 3:25
- Label: RCA Nashville
- Songwriters: Kane Brown; Matt McGinn; Alexander Izquierdo; Ryan Vojtesak
- Producer: Dann Huff

Kane Brown singles chronology
"Be Like That" (2020)	"Worship You" (2020)	"Famous Friends" (2021)

Music video
- "Worship You" on YouTube

"Worship You" is a song recorded by American country music singer Kane Brown. It was released on October 26, 2020 as the fourth single from his third EP Mixtape, Vol. 1. The song was written by Brown, Matt McGinn, Alexander Izquierdo and Ryan Vojtesak, and produced by Dann Huff.

== Background ==
Brown released "Worship You" for his wife, Katelyn Jae, and celebrated their first wedding anniversary. "Worship You" depicted Brown's belief in their love, liked he believed the Bible. In ABC's interview, Brown headlined the memories: "When we were writing it, we really didn't know what to write about. I think we tried like four different songs before we wrote that song... But I remember us writing it. It came, you know, so fluent. We actually wrote it pretty fast."

Brown continuous description: "Everything that we threw out, it was literally kind of like that we were in church, you know. Everything that we said: 'down on my knees praying,' 'If you were religion, I'd worship you.'"

== Music video ==
The music video was released on October 31, 2020, directed by Alex Alvga. It was filmed in the mountain forests of Jackson Hole, Wyoming, and starred Brown's wife Katelyn and their young daughter, Kingsley.

== Live performance ==
On October 21, 2020. Brown debuted the song "Worship You" on TV at the 2020 CMT Music Awards, held on Bicentennial Capitol Mall State Park in Nashville.

== Charts ==
=== Weekly charts ===
Weekly chart performance for "Worship You"
Chart (2020–2021)	Peak position
Canada Digital Songs (Billboard)	47
US Bubbling Under Hot 100 (Billboard)	3
US Country Airplay (Billboard)	23
US Hot Country Songs (Billboard)	24

=== Year-end charts ===
Year-end chart performance for "Worship You"
Chart (2021)	Position
US Hot Country Songs (Billboard)	72

== Certifications ==
Region	Certification	Certified units/sales
United States (RIAA)	Platinum	1,000,000^{‡}
^{‡} Sales+streaming figures based on certification alone.
