= Good as You =

Single by Kane Brown

from the album Experiment
- Released: January 7, 2019
- Genre: Country; R&B
- Length: 3:12
- Label: RCA Nashville
- Songwriters: Kane Brown; Brock Berryhill; Shy Carter; Taylor Phillips; Will Weatherly
- Producer: Dann Huff

Kane Brown singles chronology
"Lose It" (2018)	"Good as You" (2019)	"Saturday Nights (Remix)" (2019)

"Good as You" is a song recorded by American country music singer Kane Brown. It is the second single to his second major-label album Experiment. Brown wrote the song with Brock Berryhill, Shy Carter, Taylor Phillips, and Will Weatherly. Dann Huff produced the song.

== Content and history ==
Brown wrote the song with Shy Carter, Taylor Phillips, and Will Weatherly. He said that the song's idea came when Carter began performing on a ukulele, and then Phillips provided the lyric "Girl, I want to be good as you." The song features banjo and electric guitar, and its lyrical theme is a love ballad to his wife, Katelynn. Brown performed the song on January 14, 2019 on Good Morning America. He also filmed a wedding video including the song.

== Chart performance ==
In the week ending May 27, 2019, "Good as You" became Kane Brown's fourth consecutive and total number one on the Country Airplay chart. As of July 2019, the single has sold 194,000 copies in the US. On December 7, 2023, the single was certified triple platinum by the Recording Industry Association of America (RIAA) for combined sales and streaming equivalent units of over three million units in the United States.

== Music video ==
Directed by Reid Long, the video features a young boy (played by This is Us's Lonnie Chavis, who on the show plays 8-year old Randall). It begins with him waking up in the dead of night noticing his mom (a physician assistant) showing his grandmother the bills. The next day seems to go as normal for the boy (his mom packs him star-shaped sandwiches for lunch, he gets on the school bus only to get picked on by two other kids, he meets his friend and shares his lunch with her) but takes a drastic turn when older boys try to steal his backpack and beat him up. A policewoman (his grandma) comes by and picks him up, buys him an icee, then takes him home. That night, he and his sister devise a plan to surprise their mother. They decorate the living room into a starry night. Their mom come home from work and is very shocked and blessed that her kids did so.

Between these scenes, shots of Brown performing the song while sitting on the boy's living room couch are interspersed.

== Charts ==
=== Weekly charts ===
Chart (2019)	Peak position
Canada Hot 100 (Billboard)	62
Canada Country (Billboard)	1
US Billboard Hot 100	36
US Country Airplay (Billboard)	1
US Hot Country Songs (Billboard)	3
US Rolling Stone Top 100	79

=== Year-end charts ===
Chart (2019)	Position
US Billboard Hot 100	86
US Country Airplay (Billboard)	11
US Hot Country Songs (Billboard)	13

== Certifications ==
Region	Certification	Certified units/sales
Australia (ARIA)	Gold	35,000^{‡}
Canada (Music Canada)	3× Platinum	240,000^{‡}
United States (RIAA)	4× Platinum	4,000,000^{‡}
^{‡} Sales+streaming figures based on certification alone.
