= Josh Abbott Band =

Texas country band

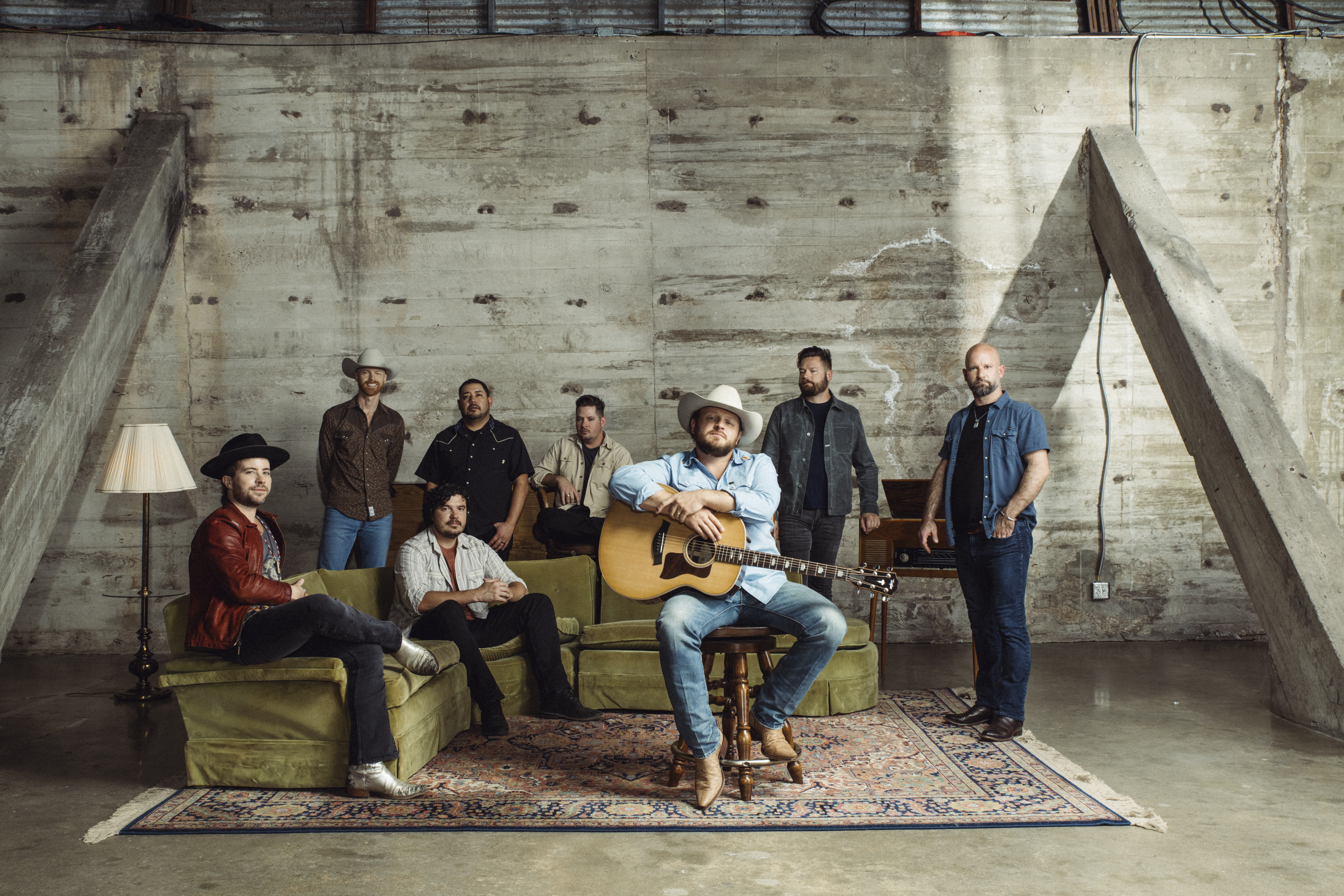

Background information
- Origin: Lubbock, Texas
- Genres: Red dirt; Texas country
- Years active: 2006–present
- Labels: Pretty Damn Tough; Josh Abbott; Atlantic Nashville
- Members: Josh Abbott; Edward Villanueva; Jimmy Hartman; David Fralin; Adam Hill; Kris Farrow

Josh Abbott Band is a Texas country band originally from Lubbock, composed of Josh Abbott, Edward Villanueva (percussion), David Fralin (keys/mandolin/harmonica/harmony vocals), Jimmy Hartman (bass guitar, harmony vocals), Kris Farrow (electric guitar, harmony vocals), and Adam Hill (fiddle). Former recent members include Preston Wait (fiddle, guitar, steel guitar), Caleb Keeter (guitar), Austin Davis (banjo), and Cale Richardson (guitar).

== Biography ==
Josh Abbott founded the band in 2006 in Lubbock, Texas while attending Texas Tech University, where he was a member of the Texas Epsilon chapter of Phi Delta Theta. He founded the band while in grad school with fraternity brothers Austin Davis, Neel Huey, and Andrew Hurt. The band recorded a 4-song demo including "Taste" in 2007 along with fiddler Preston Wait and began touring in 2008. Huey and Hurt dropped out to pursue careers while Preston Wait and Eddie Villanueva officially joined. The band then recorded their debut album “Scapegoat” in 2008 as well. Caleb Keeter and James Hertless joined in 2010, with Hertless eventually departing in 2018.

The sophomore album, She's Like Texas, followed in 2010 and entered the Top Country Albums chart. Michael Berick of Allmusic rated it four stars out of five, comparing it to Steve Earle and saying that Abbott's songwriting showed "maturity".

"She's Like Texas" includes the single "Oh, Tonight", which entered the Country Songs chart in early 2011 at #59 and peaked at #44.

In August 2015, the band announced their fourth studio album, titled Front Row Seat, a concept album detailing Abbott's relationship and failed marriage.

Josh Abbott Band's single "Wasn't That Drunk", featuring Carly Pearce, was released to radio on March 21, 2016. The band made their national television debut with the single on Jimmy Kimmel Live! on May 31, 2016, and performed "Amnesia" on CONAN on January 18, 2017.

On August 18, 2017, Josh Abbott Band released their 5th studio album, Until My Voice Goes Out, which included a string and horn section.

The band performed at the 2017 Route 91 Harvest, the scene of the 2017 Las Vegas shooting.

In November 2020, the band released their 6th studio album, The Highway Kind, produced by Marshall Altman. This album featured songs like "Settle Me Down", "The Luckiest" and "The Highway Kind" which have become mainstays in the band's catalog.

The band toured consistently throughout Texas and the United States, and reconvened in 2022 to record their 7th studio album, Somewhere Down The Road.

== Discography ==
=== Albums ===
Title	Album details	Peak chart positions				Sales
Title	Album details	US Country	US	US Indie	US Heat	Sales
Scapegoat	Release date: March 31, 2008; Label: Pretty Damn Tough	—	—	—	—	
She's Like Texas	Release date: February 16, 2010; Label: Pretty Damn Tough	28	—	28	5	
Small Town Family Dream	Release date: April 24, 2012; Label: Pretty Damn Tough	5	15	2	—	US: 67,000
Front Row Seat	Release date: November 6, 2015; Label: Pretty Damn Tough, Reviver	9	39	1	—	US: 21,400
Until My Voice Goes Out	Release date: August 18, 2017; Label: Pretty Damn Tough, Reviver	22	141	6	—	US: 5,100
The Highway Kind	Release date: November 13, 2020; Label: Pretty Damn Tough	—	—	—	—	—
Somewhere Down The Road	Release date: January 26, 2024; Label: Pretty Damn Tough	—	—	—	—	—
"—" denotes releases that did not chart

=== Extended plays ===
Title	Album details	Peak chart positions		Sales
Title	Album details	US Country	US	Sales
Tuesday Night	Release date: September 23, 2014; Label: Atlantic	12	58	
Catching Fire	Release date: June 28, 2019; Label: Pretty Damn Tough	—	—	US: 700
The Encore	Release date: September 26, 2025; Label: Pretty Damn Tough	—	—	
"—" denotes releases that did not chart

=== Singles ===
Year	Single	Peak chart positions			Album
Year	Single	US Country	US Country Airplay	US Bubbling	Album
2010	"She's Like Texas"	—		—	She's Like Texas
2010	"Road Trippin'"	—		—	She's Like Texas
2011	"Oh, Tonight" (with Kacey Musgraves)	44		—	She's Like Texas
2011	"My Texas" (with Pat Green)	—		—	Small Town Family Dream
2012	"Touch"	41		8	Small Town Family Dream
2012	"I'll Sing About Mine"	—		—	Small Town Family Dream
2013	"She Will Be Free"	—	—	—	Small Town Family Dream
2014	"Hangin' Around"	44	47	—	Tuesday Night
2015	"Amnesia"	45	56	—	Front Row Seat
2016	"Wasn't That Drunk" (with Carly Pearce)	46	37	—	Front Row Seat
2016	"Amnesia" (re-release)	—	—	—	Front Row Seat
2017	"Texas Women, Tennessee Whiskey"	—	—	—	Until My Voice Goes Out
2018	"Girl Down in Texas"	—	—	—	Until My Voice Goes Out
"—" denotes releases that did not chart

=== Other certified songs ===
Year	Single	Certifications	Album
2020	"Settle Me Down"	RIAA: Gold	The Highway Kind

=== Music videos ===
Year	Video	Director
2010	"She's Like Texas"	Evan Kaufmann
2010	"Road Trippin'"	Evan Kaufmann
2011	"Oh, Tonight" (with Kacey Musgraves)	Evan Kaufmann
2012	"Touch"	Evan Kaufmann
2013	"I'll Sing About Mine"	Evan Kaufmann
2013	"She Will Be Free"	Evan Kaufmann
2016	"Wasn't That Drunk" (with Carly Pearce)	Zack Morris
2016	"Wasn't That Drunk" (with Carly Pearce)	Evan Kaufmann
2017	"Amnesia"	Evan Kaufmann
2018	"Girl Down in Texas"	Shaun Silva/Wes Edwards
