= One Thing Right =

Single by Marshmello and Kane Brown
- Released: June 21, 2019
- Genre: EDM; country pop; pop punk
- Length: 3:01
- Label: Joytime Collective; RCA Nashville
- Songwriters: Marshmello; Kane Brown; Jesse Frasure; Josh Hoge; Matt McGinn
- Producer: Marshmello

Marshmello singles chronology
"Rescue Me" (2019)	"One Thing Right" (2019)	"Room to Fall" (2019)

Kane Brown singles chronology
"Saturday Nights (Remix)" (2019)	"One Thing Right" (2019)	"Homesick" (2019)

Music video
- "One Thing Right" on YouTube

"One Thing Right" is a song by American producer Marshmello and American singer Kane Brown, released on June 21, 2019. Its music video was launched on July 19, 2019.

== Background ==
Brown described the song as "kind of the opposite" of Marshmello's song "Happier".

== Composition ==
"One Thing Right" is an EDM and country song fused with pop punk elements into a trap-tinged beat with some twangy vocals and banjo.

The lyrical story is that of a man who lies, steals and always gets himself in trouble. The only thing he doesn't screw up is the love he's somehow found while being such a rascal.

== Promotion ==
Both Marshmello and Brown posted about the song on social media on June 17.

== Chart performance ==
The song peaked at number one on the Billboard's US Hot Country Songs on chart dated October 12, 2019. As of March 2020, the single has sold 273,000 copies in the US. On December 7, 2023, the single was certified quadruple platinum by the Recording Industry Association of America (RIAA) for combined sales and streaming equivalent units of over four million units in the United States.

== Music videos ==
The lyrics video was uploaded on YouTube on June 21, 2019, it has 21 million views after almost two months of its release. The official music video was premiered on July 19, 2019, on YouTube.

The alternate video was uploaded on July 26, 2019.

== Remixes ==
Two remix EPs of the song were released in 2019. The first one contained remixes by Firebeatz, Duke & Jones, PMP, KDrew and DJ duo Subshock and Evangelos. The second one contained a Late Night remix by Marshmello and two remixes by Koni and Ruhde.

== Charts ==
=== Weekly charts ===
Chart (2019)	Peak position
Australia (ARIA)	4
Australia Dance (ARIA)	1
Austria (Ö3 Austria Top 40)	54
Belgium (Ultratip Bubbling Under Flanders)	21
Belgium (Ultratip Bubbling Under Wallonia)	17
Canada (Canadian Hot 100)	12
Canada CHR/Top 40 (Billboard)	14
Canada Country (Billboard)	37
Canada Hot AC (Billboard)	36
Czech Republic (Singles Digitál Top 100)	19
Germany (GfK)	71
Hungary (Stream Top 40)	14
Ireland (IRMA)	37
Latvia (LAIPA)	14
Lithuania (AGATA)	15
Mexico Ingles Airplay (Billboard)	25
New Zealand Hot Singles (RMNZ)	9
Portugal (AFP)	81
Slovakia (Rádio Top 100)	65
Slovakia (Singles Digitál Top 100)	13
Sweden (Sverigetopplistan)	92
UK Singles (OCC)	76
US Billboard Hot 100	36
US Adult Pop Airplay (Billboard)	18
US Dance/Mix Show Airplay (Billboard)	38
US Hot Country Songs (Billboard)	1
US Pop Airplay (Billboard)	16
US Rolling Stone Top 100	19

=== Year-end charts ===
Chart (2019)	Position
Australia (ARIA)	23
Canada (Canadian Hot 100)	39
US Billboard Hot 100	89
US Hot Country Songs (Billboard)	21
US Rolling Stone Top 100	85

Chart (2020)	Position
Australia (ARIA)	69
US Hot Country Songs (Billboard)	57

== Certifications ==
Region	Certification	Certified units/sales
Australia (ARIA)	6× Platinum	420,000^{‡}
Brazil (Pro-Música Brasil)	2× Platinum	80,000^{‡}
Canada (Music Canada)	9× Platinum	720,000^{‡}
New Zealand (RMNZ)	2× Platinum	60,000^{‡}
United Kingdom (BPI)	Silver	200,000^{‡}
United States (RIAA)	5× Platinum	5,000,000^{‡}
Streaming
Sweden (GLF)	Gold	4,000,000^{†}
^{‡} Sales+streaming figures based on certification alone.^{†} Streaming-only figures based on certification alone.
