= Homesick (Kane Brown song) =

Single by Kane Brown

from the album Experiment
- Released: August 5, 2019
- Genre: Country
- Length: 3:25
- Label: RCA Nashville
- Songwriter(s): Kane Brown; Brock Berryhill; Matt McGinn; Taylor Phillips
- Producer(s): Dann Huff

Kane Brown singles chronology
"One Thing Right" (2019)	"Homesick" (2019)	"Cool Again" (2020)

"Homesick" is a song co-written and recorded by American country music singer Kane Brown. It was released as the third single to his second album, Experiment, on August 5, 2019. Brown wrote the song with Brock Berryhill, Matt McGinn, and Taylor Phillips, and it was produced by Dann Huff.

== Content ==
"Homesick" was co-written by Brown with Brock Berryhill, Matt McGinn, and Taylor Phillips about Brown's own "experience traveling on the road and being away from his loved ones," but the singer dedicated the song to military families: "I thought, 'There's not many songs going out these days about the military like there used to be.' I felt like this would really hit home for them. Just kind of like memories of, you know, anybody dancing in a kitchen, singing favorite songs with each other." Brown got his inspiration for the song while at a tattoo parlor when the artist suggested he put the word "homesick" on his knuckles, and he started writing the song on his bus before a performance at Coyote Joe's in Charlotte, North Carolina.

== Chart performance ==
"Homesick" debuted at number 24 on the Billboard Hot Country Songs chart dated September 22, 2018, before its initial release as a single. It later debuted at number 45 on the Billboard Country Airplay chart dated August 17, 2019. It also debuted at number 95 on the US Billboard Hot 100 chart dated November 30, 2019. It reached number one on Country Airplay in March 2020, which is Brown's fifth consecutive number one on the chart.

As of March 2020, the song has sold 136,000 copies in the US. On December 7, 2023, the single was certified triple platinum by the Recording Industry Association of America (RIAA) for combined sales and streaming equivalent units of over three million units in the United States.

== Music video ==
The music video for "Homesick" premiered on September 20, 2018. In it, Brown is shown performing the song for the California National Guard, interspersed with a compilation of clips that show service members returning home to their families.

== Charts ==
=== Weekly charts ===
Chart (2019–2020)	Peak position
Canada (Canadian Hot 100)	78
Canada Country (Billboard)	2
US Billboard Hot 100	35
US Country Airplay (Billboard)	1
US Hot Country Songs (Billboard)	3
US Rolling Stone Top 100	89

=== Year-end charts ===
Chart (2019)	Position
US Hot Country Songs (Billboard)	74

Chart (2020)	Position
US Billboard Hot 100	89
US Country Airplay (Billboard)	7
US Hot Country Songs (Billboard)	22

== Certifications ==
Region	Certification	Certified units/sales
Australia (ARIA)	Gold	35,000^{‡}
Canada (Music Canada)	2× Platinum	160,000^{‡}
United States (RIAA)	3× Platinum	3,000,000^{‡}
^{‡} Sales+streaming figures based on certification alone.
