= Neon Church =

Single by Tim McGraw
- Released: October 4, 2018
- Genre: Country; Adult contemporary
- Length: 3:33
- Label: Columbia Nashville
- Songwriters: Ben Goldsmith; Ben Stennis; Ross Ellis Lipsey
- Producers: Byron Gallimore; Tim McGraw

Tim McGraw singles chronology
"The Rest of Our Life" (2017)	"Neon Church" (2018)	"Thought About You" (2019)

"Neon Church" is a song recorded by American country music artist Tim McGraw and written by Ben Goldsmith, Ben Stennis, and Ross Ellis Lipsey. It was released on October 4, 2018, as his first single for Columbia Nashville and was intended to be the lead single from McGraw's upcoming fifteenth studio album. However, McGraw parted ways with the label before it was included on an album.

== Charts ==
=== Weekly charts ===
Chart (2018–2019)	Peak position
Canada Country (Billboard)	41
US Country Airplay (Billboard)	20
US Hot Country Songs (Billboard)	24

=== Year-end charts ===
Chart (2019)	Position
US Hot Country Songs (Billboard)	95
