= Cool Again =

2020 single by Kane Brown

Single by Kane Brown

from the EP Mixtape, Vol. 1
- Released: April 22, 2020
- Genre: Country pop
- Length: 2:44 (EP version); 2:55 (remix featuring Nelly)
- Label: RCA Nashville
- Songwriters: Kane Brown; Josh Hoge; Matt McGinn; Lindsay Rimes
- Producers: Dann Huff; Lindsay Rimes

Kane Brown singles chronology
"Homesick" (2019)	"Cool Again" (2020)	"Worldwide Beautiful" (2020)

"Cool Again" (Remix)
- Cover for remix featuring Nelly

"Cool Again" is a song by American country music singer Kane Brown. It was released on April 22, 2020, through RCA Records Nashville as the lead single from his third EP Mixtape, Vol. 1.

== Content ==
Brown wrote the song with Josh Hoge, Matt McGinn, and Lindsay Rimes at a songwriter's retreat during the wintertime. Rimes also co-produced the song with Dann Huff.

According to Brown, they wrote the song's instrumentation first before coming up with the concept of "a relationship turned cold". In August 2020, Brown remixed the song featuring rapper Nelly. This remix also received a music video featuring the two singers on a beach.

== Charts ==
=== Weekly charts ===
Chart (2020)	Peak position
Canada Hot 100 (Billboard)	54
Canada Country (Billboard)	3
US Billboard Hot 100	29
US Country Airplay (Billboard)	3
US Hot Country Songs (Billboard)	5
US Rolling Stone Top 100	53

=== Year-end charts ===
Chart (2020)	Position
US Country Airplay (Billboard)	28
US Hot Country Songs (Billboard)	21

== Certifications ==
Region	Certification	Certified units/sales
Canada (Music Canada)	Platinum	80,000^{‡}
United States (RIAA)	Platinum	1,000,000^{‡}
^{‡} Sales+streaming figures based on certification alone.
