= Thought About You =

Single by Tim McGraw
- Released: February 4, 2019
- Genre: Country
- Length: 3:45
- Label: Columbia Nashville
- Songwriters: Brad Warren; Brett Warren; Lee Thomas Miller
- Producers: Tim McGraw; Byron Gallimore

Tim McGraw singles chronology
"Neon Church" (2018)	"Thought About You" (2019)	"I Called Mama" (2020)

"Thought About You" is a song by American country music singer Tim McGraw. Written by The Warren Brothers (Brad and Brett Warren) and Lee Thomas Miller, the song is McGraw's second released single for Columbia Records Nashville.

== Content ==
In 2019, McGraw announced plans to make a new album on Columbia Records Nashville after leaving Arista Nashville. His second single release for the label is "Thought About You", described by the blog The Boot as "an emotional power ballad that takes his listeners through a journey of love, faith, loss, and all the ups and downs that life brings." Following the single release in October 2018, McGraw released a lyric video for the song as well.

== Charts ==
=== Weekly charts ===
Chart (2019)	Peak position
Canada Country (Billboard)	50
US Country Airplay (Billboard)	17
US Hot Country Songs (Billboard)	26

=== Year-end charts ===
Chart (2019)	Position
US Country Airplay (Billboard)	53
US Hot Country Songs (Billboard)	65
