= Chapter 1 (EP) =

EP by Kane Brown
- Released: March 18, 2016
- Genre: Country pop
- Length: 14:44
- Label: RCA Nashville
- Producer: Matthew McVaney

Kane Brown chronology
Closer (2015)	Chapter 1 (2016)	Kane Brown (2016)

Singles from Chapter 1
- 1. "Used to Love You Sober" Released: October 21, 2015

Chapter 1 is the second extended play (EP) by American country music singer Kane Brown who is signed with Sony Music Nashville in early 2016. The five-song EP was released on March 18, 2016, as his first EP with the Sony label although he had an earlier independently released EP on his own label titled Closer. Chapter 1 is considered a prelude to his debut studio album which was released later in 2016.

Brown co-wrote four of the five tracks on the EP with co-writers including Chris Young, Corey Crowder and Josh Hoge. The EP's lead single, "Used to Love You Sober" is Brown's first official single, although he had released "Don't Go City on Me" single independently. Both the EP and the single "Used to Love You Sober" were great commercial successes.

== Reception ==
The album debuted at number nine on the US Billboard 200, and number three on the Top Country Albums chart, selling 23,000 copies in the first week. The album has sold 89,800 copies in the United States as of September 2017.

== Track listing ==
No.	Title	Writer(s)	Length
1.	"Wide Open"	Kane Brown; Corey Crowder; Justin Lantz	3:05
2.	"Used to Love You Sober"	Brown; Josh Hoge; Matthew McVaney	3:01
3.	"Last Minute Late Night"	Ben Caver; Crowder; Matt McGinn	2:54
4.	"Excuses"	Brown; Hoge; McVaney	3:01
5.	"There Goes My Everything"	Brown; Hoge; McVaney; Chris Young	2:43

== Personnel ==
Adapted from AllMusic

- Kane Brown - lead vocals
- Corey Crowder - keyboards, programming, background vocals
- Matthew McVaney - banjo, bass guitar, acoustic guitar, electric guitar, keyboards, piano, programming, six-string banjo, string instrument, background vocals
- Danny Rader - bouzouki, acoustic guitar, electric guitar, piano
- F. Reid Shippen - percussion, programming

== Charts ==
=== Weekly charts ===
Chart (2016)	Peak position
Canadian Albums (Billboard)	28
US Billboard 200	9
US Top Country Albums (Billboard)	3

=== Year-end charts ===
Chart (2016)	Position
US Top Country Albums (Billboard)	43
