= Used to Love You Sober =

- Digital single cover

Single by Kane Brown

from the album Chapter 1
- Released: October 21, 2015
- Recorded: 2015
- Genre: Country
- Length: 3:01
- Label: Zone 4; RCA Nashville
- Songwriter(s): Kane Brown; Josh Hoge; Matt McVaney
- Producer(s): Matt McVaney

Kane Brown singles chronology
"Used to Love You Sober" (2015)	"Thunder in the Rain" (2016)

"Used to Love You Sober" is a song recorded by American country music singer Kane Brown. It was first released on October 21, 2015, as his debut single, then re-released under the Sony / RCA Nashville label on February 16, 2016, after Brown was signed to the label. Brown co-wrote the song with Josh Hoge and Matt McVaney.

== Background ==
In 2014, Brown began to post videos of his covers of songs by various country singers on social media, where he gained a following. On September 30, 2015, he posted his cover of George Strait's "Check Yes or No" on Facebook, which went viral and received over seven million views. His followers on Facebook reached over a million in a short time. Brown followed this up quickly on October 8, 2015, by releasing a clip of a teaser for his own single "Used to Love You Sober." The clip received one million views in under three hours, and reached over 11 million views two weeks later.

On October 21, 2015, the single "Used to Love You Sober" was released on his birthday. The song was spotlighted on Zane Lowe's iTunes radio station Beats 1.

After Brown was signed to Sony / RCA Nashville in January 2016, the single was re-released as his first official single under the label on February 16, 2016.

== Content ==
The song describes someone going through a breakup of a relationship, who can only get love off his mind by drinking, and that being drunk is the only way he doesn't feel like he's still in love.

== Commercial performance ==
The song was released on the sixth day of the weekly chart tracking period, and based on just two days of sales, it debuted at number two on the Country Digital Songs chart, number seven on the Bubbling Under Hot 100 Singles chart, and number 22 on the Hot Country Songs chart, with 38,000 copies sold. The single's release helped push Brown's EP Closer to number 22 on the Top Album Sales chart. In its second week, it sold 46,000 copies, and debuted on the US Billboard Hot 100 at number 82.

The song was re-released in February 2016 after Brown was signed to RCA Nashville, and entered the Country Airplay chart for the week of February 27, 2016, at number 58. As of July 2016, the song has sold 314,000 downloads in the US.

== Music videos ==
The first music video was directed by Clark Jackson and premiered in December 2015. A new video was released on March 18, 2016, after Brown was signed to RCA Nashville. The video was filmed at a show at Coyote Joe's in Charlotte, North Carolina, directed by David Poag.

== Chart performance ==
=== Weekly charts ===
Chart (2015–2016)	Peak position
US Billboard Hot 100	82
US Country Airplay (Billboard)	35
US Hot Country Songs (Billboard)	15

=== Year-end charts ===
Chart (2016)	Position
US Hot Country Songs (Billboard)	95

== Certifications ==
Region	Certification	Certified units/sales
Canada (Music Canada)	Platinum	80,000^{‡}
United States (RIAA)	2× Platinum	2,000,000^{‡}
^{‡} Sales+streaming figures based on certification alone.
