= Closer (Kane Brown EP) =

EP by Kane Brown
- Released: June 2, 2015
- Genre: Country
- Length: 20:31
- Label: Kane Brown
- Producer: Noah Henson

Kane Brown chronology
Closer (2015)	Chapter 1 (2016)

Singles from Closer
- 1. "Don't Go City on Me" Released: October 22, 2014

Closer is the debut extended play (EP) by American country music singer Kane Brown. Brown released the EP in early June 2015 after raising funds via Kickstarter.

== Background ==
In 2014, Brown raised funds via crowdfunding site Kickstarter to produce a six-song EP, which he recorded in Nashville at the home studio of Noah Henson, guitarist for Brantley Gilbert. The EP, titled Closer, was released on June 2, 2015. A single from the EP, "Don't Go City on Me", was first released on October 22, 2014, and it reached number 43 on the Country Digital Songs chart.

== Commercial performance ==
The EP entered on the Top Country Albums chart at number 22, selling 3,200 copies in its first week of release week in June 2015. In October 2015, spurred on by interest through this covers of song posted on Facebook, such as George Strait's "Check Yes or No", the EP debuted on the US Billboard 200 at number 161 in October 2015. It jumped to number 40 on the US Billboard 200, and number 22 on the Top Album Sales chart the following week on the release of clips of "Used to Love You Sober" and covers such as Lonestar's "Amazed". It also reached at number eight on the Top Country Albums chart the same week, selling 8,100 copies that week (9,000 equivalent album units), with 97 percent of its total sales coming from downloads. It peaked at number seven the following week. The EP has sold 38,300 copies in the United States as of March 2016.

== Track listing ==
No.	Title	Writer(s)	Length
1.	"Closer"	Kane Brown; John Hanna; Nate Montgomery	3:01
2.	"Hit the Gas"	Deana Carter; Levi Hummon	2:54
3.	"It Turns Me On"	Brown	3:38
4.	"Don't Go City on Me"	Brown; Casey Carpenter; Josh Johnson	3:31
5.	"Forgetting Is the Hardest Part"	Brown	3:56
6.	"Lost More Than I Found" (featuring Lainey Edwards)	Brown; Charlotte Sands	3:31

== Chart performance ==
Chart (2015)	Peak position
US Billboard 200	40
US Top Country Albums (Billboard)	7
US Independent Albums (Billboard)	6
