= Thunder in the Rain =

Single by Kane Brown

from the album Kane Brown
- Released: August 22, 2016
- Genre: Country
- Length: 2:46
- Label: RCA Nashville
- Songwriters: Kane Brown; Josh Hoge; Matt McVaney
- Producer: Matt McVaney

Kane Brown singles chronology
"Used to Love You Sober" (2015)	"Thunder in the Rain" (2016)	"What Ifs" (2017)

"Thunder in the Rain" is a song co-written and recorded by American country music artist Kane Brown. It was released on August 22, 2016 as the debut radio single from his 2016 self-titled debut album. Brown wrote the song with Josh Hoge and the song's producer Matt McVaney. On December 1, 2016, Brown performed the song on the fourteenth season of The Ellen DeGeneres Show in promotion of his debut album.

== Critical reception ==
Markos Papadatos of the Digital Journal gave the song a favorable review, rating it 4.5 out of 5 stars and comparing the song to Brown's earlier single "Used to Love You Sober". He concluded his review by writing "Overall, Kane Brown is rocking on his new single "Thunder in the Rain." He is an artist that can do no wrong with whatever music he puts out." Billy Dukes of Taste of Country was similarly favorable, writing "Brown is at his best with help. "Thunder in the Rain" is an uptempo country mix that charges forward like a herd of horses".

== Commercial performance ==
The song has sold 66,000 copies in the United States as of January 2017.

== Chart performance ==
Chart (2016–2017)	Peak position
US Bubbling Under Hot 100 (Billboard)	22
US Country Airplay (Billboard)	43
US Hot Country Songs (Billboard)	30

== Certifications ==
Region	Certification	Certified units/sales
Canada (Music Canada)	Gold	40,000^{‡}
United States (RIAA)	Gold	500,000^{‡}
^{‡} Sales+streaming figures based on certification alone.
