= Chris Young discography =

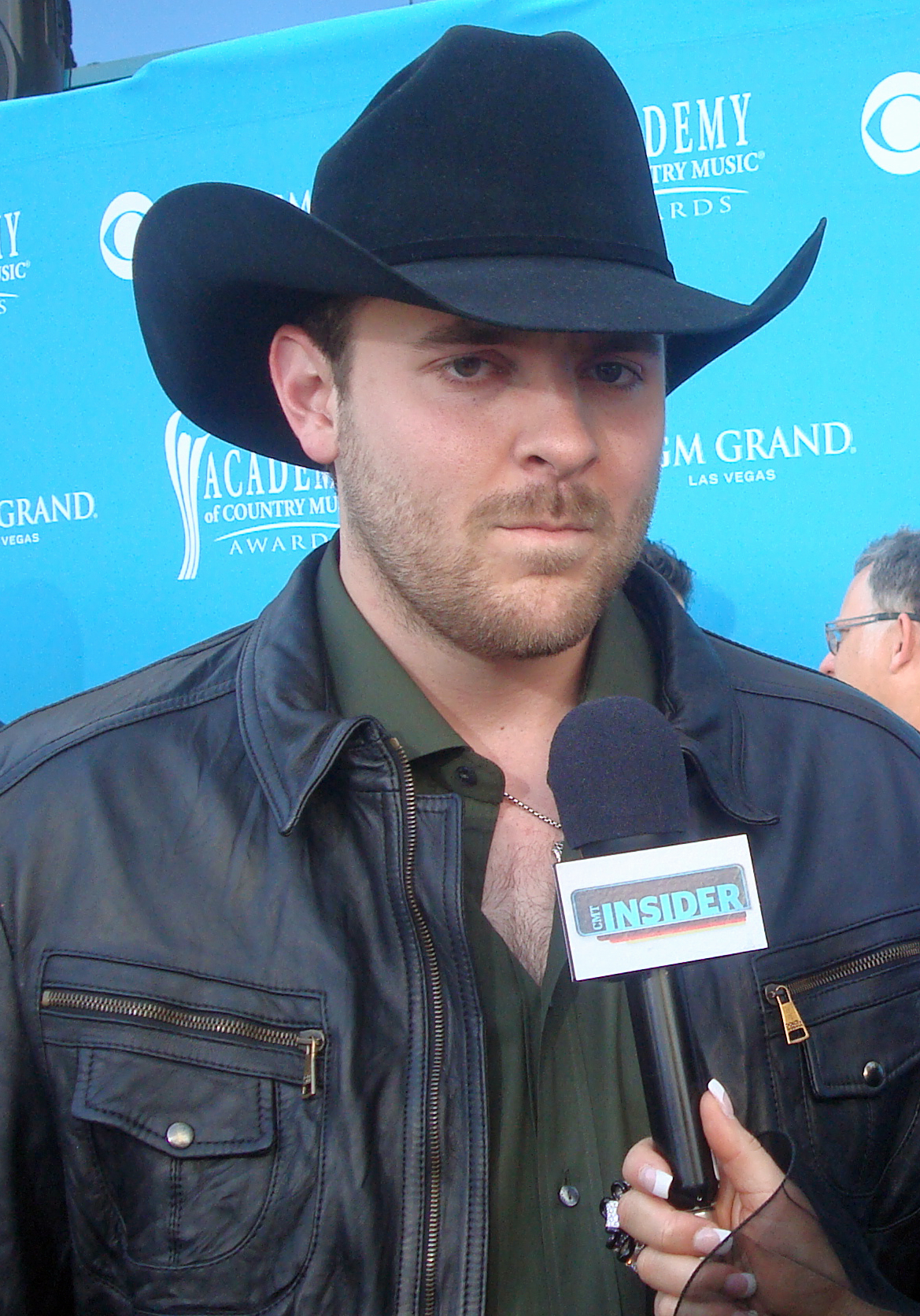
- Young being interviewed in April 2010.
- Studio albums: 10
- Singles: 25
- Music videos: 19
- Extended plays: 1
- Other charted songs: 4
- No. 1 Singles: 11

American country music singer and songwriter Chris Young has released ten studio albums, twenty four singles (one of which was released twice), and nineteen music videos. Eleven of his singles have reached number one on either the US Billboard Hot Country Songs or Country Airplay charts. In 2006, Young rose to fame as the winner of season four of American reality singing competition Nashville Star. He released his debut self-titled album in October of that year, which produced two singles that failed to reach the Top 40 of the Country Songs chart.

He released his second studio album, The Man I Want to Be, in September 2009. Lead single "Voices" initially peaked at 37 on the country chart, but was successfully re-released in 2010 after Young experienced a commercial breakthrough with subsequent singles "Gettin' You Home (The Black Dress Song)" and the title track. All three singles released from the album were number one hits and received at least a Gold certification from RIAA.

Neon was released July 12, 2011. Its first two singles, "Tomorrow" and "You", rose to number one, earning Young a five-song streak of chart-toppers. The follow-up single, "Neon", stalled at 23 on the Hot Country Songs chart. A fourth single, "I Can Take It from There", reached the top 5 on the newly separated Country Airplay chart but only top 20 on the combined-metric Hot Country Songs chart.

Young's fourth album, A.M., reached a career-high peak of 3 on the all-genre Billboard 200 chart and was also his first album to chart in both Australia and Canada (at 53 and 10, respectively). Three singles were released from the album, which all reached the Top 3 on the Country Airplay chart and the Top 10 on both the Hot Country Songs and the Canada Country airplay chart.

In 2015, Young released his fifth album, I'm Comin' Over, and earned his first number one on the Top Country Albums chart. The record was also Young's fastest record to be certified Gold by RIAA. The record's lead single of the same name reached number one on both the Country Airplay and Canada Country charts. "Think of You", a duet with Cassadee Pope, was Young's first single to feature another artist and also reached number one. His Vince Gill collaboration, "Sober Saturday Night", serves as the album's third single and third consecutive number one single.

Losing Sleep was released on October 20, 2017, and was his second album to reach number one on the Top Country Albums chart. Its lead single, the title track, reached number one on the Country Airplay chart. "Hangin' On", the album's second single, peaked at number two on the Country Airplay chart.

On January 28, 2019, Young released the leadoff single to his eighth studio album, "Raised on Country", which peaked at number 5 on the Country Airplay chart. "Drowning", the second single, stalled at number 25 on the Country Airplay chart. The third single, "Famous Friends", featuring Kane Brown, reached number one on the Country Airplay chart, and would be Young's first single featuring another artist to do so in five years. The album, also titled Famous Friends, was released on August 6, 2021, and peaked at number three on the Top Country Albums chart. In 2023, Young released the singles "Looking for You" and "Young Love & Saturday Nights". On March 22, 2024, he released his ninth album Young Love & Saturday Nights. On October 17, 2025, Young released his tenth album I Didn't Come Here to Leave.

== Studio albums ==
Title	Details	Peak chart positions					Certifications (sales threshold)	Sales
Title	Details	US	US Country	AUS	CAN	UK Country	Certifications (sales threshold)	Sales
Chris Young	Release date: October 3, 2006; Label: RCA Nashville; Formats: CD, digital download	22	3	—	—	—		
The Man I Want to Be	Release date: September 1, 2009; Label: RCA Nashville; Formats: CD, digital download	19	6	—	—	—	RIAA: Platinum	
Neon	Release date: July 12, 2011; Label: RCA Nashville; Formats: CD, digital download	4	2	—	—	16	RIAA: Platinum	US: 418,500
A.M.	Release date: September 17, 2013; Label: RCA Nashville; Formats: CD, digital download	3	2	53	10	2	RIAA: Platinum	US: 267,000
I'm Comin' Over	Release date: November 13, 2015; Label: RCA Nashville; Formats: CD, digital download	5	1	36	11	3	RIAA: Platinum	US: 271,000
It Must Be Christmas	Release date: October 14, 2016; Label: RCA Nashville; Formats: CD, digital download	48	4	—	—	7		US: 74,100
Losing Sleep	Release date: October 20, 2017; Label: RCA Nashville; Formats: CD, digital download	5	1	33	22	6	RIAA: Gold	US: 117,000
Famous Friends	Release date: August 6, 2021; Label: RCA Nashville; Formats: CD, vinyl, digital download, streaming	13	3	64	44	2	RIAA: Gold	
Young Love & Saturday Nights	Release date: March 22, 2024; Label: RCA Nashville; Formats: CD, vinyl, digital download, streaming	183	34	—	—	4		
I Didn't Come Here to Leave	Release date: October 17, 2025; Label: Black River Entertainment; Formats: CD, vinyl, digital download, streaming	—	50	—	—	—		
"—" denotes releases that did not chart

== Extended plays ==
Title	Details
Voices	Release date: May 25, 2010; Label: RCA Nashville; Formats: CD, digital download

== Singles ==
Year	Single	Peak chart positions					Sales	Certifications (sales threshold)	Album
Year	Single	US	US Country Songs	US Country Airplay	CAN	CAN Country	Sales	Certifications (sales threshold)	Album
2006	"Drinkin' Me Lonely"	—	42		—	—			Chris Young
2007	"You're Gonna Love Me"	—	48		—	—			Chris Young
2008	"Voices"	—	37		—	—		RIAA: Platinum	The Man I Want to Be
2009	"Gettin' You Home (The Black Dress Song)"	33	1		74	8	US: 932,000	RIAA: 2× Platinum	The Man I Want to Be
2009	"The Man I Want to Be"	48	1		81	3		RIAA: Platinum	The Man I Want to Be
2010	"Voices" (re-release)	53	1		86	6			The Man I Want to Be
2011	"Tomorrow"	36	1		95	13		RIAA: 2× Platinum	Neon
2011	"You"	34	1		66	1		RIAA: Platinum	Neon
2012	"Neon"	92	23		—	43		RIAA: Gold	Neon
2012	"I Can Take It from There"	63	16	4	76	4		RIAA: Gold	Neon
2013	"Aw Naw"	45	4	3	50	5	US: 561,000	RIAA: 2× Platinum; MC: Platinum	A.M.
2014	"Who I Am with You"	48	8	2	72	6	US: 565,000	RIAA: 2× Platinum; MC: Gold	A.M.
2014	"Lonely Eyes"	50	4	2	65	5	US: 470,000	RIAA: 2× Platinum; MC: Gold	A.M.
2015	"I'm Comin' Over"	33	2	1	57	1	US: 725,000	RIAA: 4× Platinum; MC: Platinum	I'm Comin' Over
2016	"Think of You" (with Cassadee Pope)	40	2	1	57	1	US: 513,000	RIAA: 2× Platinum; MC: Platinum	I'm Comin' Over
2016	"Sober Saturday Night" (featuring Vince Gill)	47	4	1	—	3	US: 204,000	RIAA: Platinum	I'm Comin' Over
2017	"Losing Sleep"	60	7	1	—	2	US: 200,000	RIAA: 2× Platinum; MC: Platinum	Losing Sleep
2018	"Hangin' On"	63	8	2	—	4	US: 50,000	RIAA: Platinum; MC: Gold	Losing Sleep
2019	"Raised on Country"	54	10	5	88	9	US: 68,000	RIAA: Gold; MC: Gold	Famous Friends
2019	"Drowning"	— (Note: "Drowning" did not enter the Hot 100, but peaked at number 9 on the Bubbling Under Hot 100 chart.)	18	25	—	—	US: 78,000	RIAA: Platinum	Famous Friends
2021	"Famous Friends" (with Kane Brown)	21	2	1	28	1		RIAA: 3× Platinum; MC: 3× Platinum	Famous Friends
2021	"At the End of a Bar" (with Mitchell Tenpenny)	75	16	1	97	10		RIAA: Gold	Famous Friends
2023	"Looking for You"	— (Note: "Looking for You" did not enter the Hot 100, but peaked at number six on the Bubbling Under Hot 100 chart.)	26	13	—	23			Young Love & Saturday Nights
2023	"Young Love & Saturday Nights"	94	26	5	—	38			Young Love & Saturday Nights
2025	"Til the Last One Dies"	—	—	21	—	49			I Didn't Come Here to Leave
2026	"I Didn't Come Here to Leave"	—	—	25	—	—			I Didn't Come Here to Leave
"—" denotes releases that did not chart

== Other charted songs ==
Year	Song	Peak chart positions			Album
Year	Song	US Country Songs	US Country Airplay	CAN Country	Album
2016	"The Christmas Song"	—	51	—	It Must Be Christmas
2017	"Setting the Night on Fire" (with Kane Brown)	45	—	—	Kane Brown
2017	"Where I Go When I Drink"	45	—	—	Losing Sleep
2025	"Christmas Ain't Christmas"	—	—	60	Non-album song

== Music videos ==
Year	Video	Director
2006	"Drinkin' Me Lonely"	Warren P. Sonada
2009	"Gettin You Home (The Black Dress Song)"	Stephen Shepherd
2009	"The Man I Want to Be"	Chris Hicky
2010	"Voices"	David McClister
2011	"Tomorrow"	Trey Fanjoy
2011	"You"	Chris Hicky
2012	"Neon"	Ryan Hamblin
2013	"Aw Naw"	Chris Hicky
2014	"Who I Am with You"	Trey Fanjoy
2014	"Lonely Eyes"	Adam Rothlein
2015	"I'm Comin' Over"	David McClister
2016	"Think of You" (with Cassadee Pope)	David McClister
2016	"Sober Saturday Night (feat. Vince Gill)"	David Poag
2017	"Losing Sleep"	Peter Zavadil
2018	"Hangin' On"	Jeff Johnson
2019	"Raised on Country"	Peter Zavadil
2019	"Drowning"	Chris Young & Jeff Johnson
2021	"Famous Friends" (with Kane Brown)	Peter Zavadil
2021	"At the End of a Bar" (with Mitchell Tenpenny)	Jeff Johnson
2024	"Young Love & Saturday Nights"	Stephen Kinigopoulos & Alexa Stone
2025	"Boots on the Ground"	Micah McNair
2025	"Til The Last One Dies"	Micah McNair
