= Famous Friends (album) =

Studio album by Chris Young
- Released: August 6, 2021
- Recorded: 2018–2021
- Genre: Country
- Length: 43:18
- Label: RCA Nashville
- Producers: Corey Crowder; Chris DeStefano; Mark Holman; Chris Young

Chris Young chronology
Losing Sleep (2017)	Famous Friends (2021)	Young Love & Saturday Nights (2024)

Singles from Famous Friends
- 1. "Raised on Country" Released: January 28, 2019; 2. "Drowning" Released: September 23, 2019; 3. "Famous Friends" Released: November 20, 2020; 4. "At the End of a Bar" Released: September 13, 2021

Famous Friends is the eighth studio album by American country music artist Chris Young. It was released on August 6, 2021, by RCA Records Nashville. It was preceded by the three singles "Raised on Country", "Drowning" and the title track. "At the End of a Bar" would be released on September 13, 2021, as the album's fourth single. Young co-wrote all but two of the songs on the album overall.

== Content ==
"Raised on Country" was released as the leadoff single on January 28, 2019. It was originally intended to be the title track, but following the releases of "Drowning" on September 23, 2019 and "Famous Friends" on November 20, 2020, Young announced after the COVID-19 pandemic that the album would be retitled to Famous Friends.

== Critical reception ==
Stephen Thomas Erlewine of AllMusic wrote that Young "started drifting toward the middle of the road around the mid-2010s", but that Famous Friends "finds him making a course correction, adding some livelier, stylish elements to his smooth foundation".

== Commercial performance ==
Famous Friends debuted at number three on the Top Country Albums chart, as well as number 13 on the Billboard 200 chart, selling 24,000 copies (including 14,000 album units) in its first week.

== Track listing ==
No.	Title	Writer(s)	Producer(s)	Length
1.	"Raised on Country"	Chris Young; Cary Barlowe; Corey Crowder	Young; Crowder	2:57
2.	"Famous Friends" (featuring Kane Brown)	Young; Barlowe; Crowder	Young; Crowder	2:46
3.	"Town Ain't Big Enough" (featuring Lauren Alaina)	Young; Barlowe; Crowder; Shay Mooney	Young; Crowder	2:51
4.	"Drowning"	Young; Crowder; Josh Hoge	Young; Crowder	3:11
5.	"Rescue Me"	Young; Hoge; Mark Holman; Matt McGinn; Christian Davis Stalnecker	Young; Holman	3:17
6.	"Break Like You Do"	Young; Chris DeStefano; Matt Rogers; Anthony Smith	Young; DeStefano	3:16
7.	"At the End of a Bar" (featuring Mitchell Tenpenny)	Young; DeStefano; Mitchell Tenpenny	Young; DeStefano	3:06
8.	"Love Looks Good on You"	Young; DeStefano; Ashley Gorley	Young; DeStefano	3:30
9.	"One of Them Nights"	Young; DeStefano; Rhett Akins	Young; DeStefano	2:42
10.	"When You're Drinking"	Young; DeStefano; Rogers; Smith	Young; Crowder	3:16
11.	"Cross Every Line"	David Garcia; Hillary Lindsey; Chase McGill	Young; Crowder	3:25
12.	"Hold My Beer Watch This"	Young; Barlowe; Crowder	Young; Crowder	2:46
13.	"Best Seat in the House"	Young; Crowder; Sarah Buxton	Young; Crowder	3:05
14.	"Tonight We're Dancing"	Young; Josh Gleave; Josh Phillips	Young	3:10
Total length:				43:18

Deluxe Edition
No.	Title	Writer(s)	Length
15.	"Everybody Needs a Song" (featuring Old Dominion)	Young; Brad Tursi; DeStefano	3:03
16.	"If I Knew What was Good for Me"	Young; Crowder; Hoge	2:48
17.	"Music Note" (featuring Jimmie Allen)	Young; Barlowe; Phillips	3:06
18.	"Like a Slow Song"	Bart Butler; Justin Ebach; Josh Thompson	3:17
19.	"Think of You (duet with Cassadee Pope)" (acoustic version)	Young; Crowder; Hoge	3:30
20.	"I'm Comin' Over" (acoustic version)	Young; Crowder; Hoge	3:09
Total length:			1:02:11

== Personnel ==
Adapted from liner notes.

=== Tracks 1–4 and 10–13 ===
- Lauren Alaina – duet vocals on "Town Ain't Big Enough"
- Cary Barlowe – bass guitar, electric guitar, background vocals
- Kane Brown – duet vocals on "Famous Friends"
- Sarah Buxton – background vocals
- Dave Cohen – B-3 organ, piano, synthesizer
- Corey Crowder – acoustic guitar, bass guitar, programming, background vocals
- Chris DeStefano – background vocals
- Hillary Lindsey – background vocals
- Tony Lucido – bass guitar
- Mac McAnally – acoustic guitar
- Rob McNelley – electric guitar
- Miles McPherson – drums
- Shay Mooney – background vocals
- Russell Terrell – background vocals
- Derek Wells – electric guitar
- Alex Wright – B-3 organ, organ, piano, synthesizer, Wurlitzer
- Chris Young – lead vocals

=== Track 5 ===
- Josh Hoge – background vocals
- Mark Holman – electric guitar, piano, programming
- Miles McPherson – drums, percussion
- Chris Young – lead vocals

=== Tracks 6–9 ===
- Chris DeStefano – acoustic guitar, banjo, bass guitar, dobro, drums, electric guitar, keyboards, piano, programming, violin, background vocals
- Ashley Gorley – background vocals
- Mitchell Tenpenny – duet vocals on "At the End of a Bar"
- Chris Young – lead vocals

=== Track 14 ===
- Dave Cohen – B-3 organ, piano, synthesizer
- Wes Hightower – background vocals
- Julian King – programming
- Tony Lucido – bass guitar
- Miles McPherson – drums, percussion
- Danny Rader – acoustic guitar
- Scotty Sanders – steel guitar
- Derek Wells – electric guitar
- Chris Young – lead vocals

== Charts ==
=== Weekly charts ===
Weekly chart performance for Famous Friends
Chart (2021)	Peak position
Australian Albums (ARIA)	64
Canadian Albums (Billboard)	44
UK Country Albums (Official Charts)	2
US Billboard 200	13
US Top Country Albums (Billboard)	3

=== Year-end charts ===
2021 Year-end chart performance for Famous Friends
Chart (2021)	Position
US Top Country Albums (Billboard)	65

2022 Year-end chart performance for Famous Friends
Chart (2022)	Position
US Top Country Albums (Billboard)	69

== Certifications ==
Certifications for Famous Friends
Region	Certification	Certified units/sales
United States (RIAA)	Gold	500,000^{‡}
^{‡} Sales+streaming figures based on certification alone.
