= Losing Sleep =

Losing Sleep may refer to:

== Music ==
=== Albums ===
- Losing Sleep (Axle Whitehead album), 2008
- Losing Sleep (Edwyn Collins album), 2010, or its title track
- Losing Sleep (Parachute album), 2009
- Losing Sleep (Chris Young album), 2017

=== Songs ===
- "Losing Sleep" (John Newman song), 2013
- "Losing Sleep" (Chris Young song), 2017
- "Losing Sleep (Still, My Heart)", a composition by Vangelis
- "Losing Sleep", a 2024 song by Tzuyu from abouTZU

== Other ==
- Insomnia
