= Looking for You (Chris Young song) =

Single by Chris Young

from the album Young Love & Saturday Nights
- B-side: "All Dogs Go to Heaven"
- Released: January 12, 2023
- Genre: Country
- Length: 3:00
- Label: RCA Nashville
- Songwriters: Chris Young; Chris DeStefano; James McNair; Emily Weisband
- Producer: Chris DeStefano

Chris Young singles chronology
| "At the End of a Bar" (2021) | "Looking for You" (2023) | "Young Love & Saturday Nights" (2023) |

"Looking for You" is a song co-written and recorded by American country music singer Chris Young. It was released on January 12, 2023 as the lead single from his ninth studio album Young Love & Saturday Nights. Young wrote the song with Emily Weisband, James McNair, and Chris DeStefano, the last of whom also produced it.

== Content ==
"Looking for You" was released to country radio on January 12, 2023. The song is Young's first solo single since "Drowning" in 2019, as the two singles in between, "Famous Friends" and "At the End of a Bar", were both duets with Kane Brown and Mitchell Tenpenny, respectively. Tom Roland of Billboard wrote that the song "celebrates a guy who discovered a longtime love when he wasn’t actually seeking one in a night spot. Additionally, the song takes a surprising turn at the end of the chorus, injecting a chord that normally wouldn’t work and stamping it with a decidedly unusual melodic twist."

Young began writing the song in May 2022 at a studio owned by songwriter and producer Chris DeStefano. Also present at the writing session were Emily Weisband and James McNair, the latter of whom provided the title. The writers also said they were inspired by "Lookin' for Love", sung by Johnny Lee for the soundtrack to the 1980 movie Urban Cowboy. The verses of the song mainly rely on an I-IV chord pattern, although DeStefano suggested adding an iv chord at the end of the song's title. He also provided most of the instrumentation, while Weisband provided a backing vocal which was digitally increased in pitch.

It was released alongside the promotional single "All Dogs Go to Heaven".

== Chart performance ==
=== Weekly charts ===
Chart performance for "Looking for You"
| Chart (2023) | Peak position |
|---|---|
| Canada Country (Billboard) | 23 |
| US Bubbling Under Hot 100 (Billboard) | 6 |
| US Country Airplay (Billboard) | 13 |
| US Hot Country Songs (Billboard) | 26 |

=== Year-end charts ===
Year-end chart performance for "Looking for You"
| Chart (2023) | Position |
|---|---|
| US Country Airplay (Billboard) | 51 |
| US Hot Country Songs (Billboard) | 73 |
