= Hangin' On =

Hangin' On may refer to:

- Hangin' On (album), a 1968 album by Waylon Jennings or its title track
- "Hangin' On" (The Gosdin Brothers song), 1967
- "Hangin' On" (Chris Young song), 2018

== See also ==
- "Hanging On", a 2011 song by Active Child
- "Hanging On", a song by Cheyenne Kimball from The Day Has Come
