= Young Love & Saturday Nights =

Studio album by Chris Young
- Released: March 22, 2024
- Recorded: 2022
- Genre: Country
- Length: 55:00
- Label: RCA Nashville
- Producers: Corey Crowder; Chris DeStefano; Chris Young

Chris Young chronology
Famous Friends (2021)	Young Love & Saturday Nights (2024)	I Didn't Come Here to Leave (2025)

Singles from Young Love & Saturday Nights
- 1. "Looking for You" Released: January 12, 2023; 2. "Young Love & Saturday Nights" Released: October 2, 2023

Young Love & Saturday Nights is the ninth studio album by American country music artist Chris Young. It was released on March 22, 2024, by RCA Records Nashville. The album was produced by Young, Corey Crowder and Chris DeStefano. "Looking for You" and its title track preceded the album as singles.

== Background ==
Young began working on the album in May 2022, with "Looking for You". Describing the album Young says that he felt like the album needed to be for him, and "It's a little louder, a little more raw. Even the stripped-down songs are heavier."

== Composition ==
Young co-wrote all but three of the album's eighteen tracks. The album's lead single "Looking for You" was written by Young, James McNair, Emily Weisband, and Chris DeStefano with production done by DeStefano. McNair and Weisband who came up with the title of the song, began working on the it before Young and DeStefano got to it. The verses of the song mainly rely on an I-IV chord pattern, although DeStefano suggested adding an iv chord at the end of the song's title. The song was almost complete when DeStefano started working on the track. The title track, "Young Love & Saturday Nights", written by Ashley Gorley, Jesse Frasure and Josh Thompson, was directly inspired by the guitar riff of David Bowie's "Rebel Rebel", and gave Bowie posthumous credit.

== Singles ==
"Looking for You" was released as the lead single on January 12, 2023.

The tile track was released as the second single on October 2, 2023.

== Track listing ==
Young Love & Saturday Nights track listing
No.	Title	Writer(s)	Producer(s)	Length
1.	"Looking for You"	Chris Young; James McNair; Emily Weisband; Chris DeStefano	DeStefano	3:00
2.	"All Dogs Go to Heaven"	Young; Cale Dodds; Corey Crowder	Young; Crowder	3:05
3.	"Young Love & Saturday Nights"	David Bowie; Ashley Gorley; Jesse Frasure; Josh Thompson	Young; Crowder; DeStefano	3:16
4.	"Don't Call Me"	Young; DeStefano; Gorley	Young; DeStefano	2:44
5.	"What She Sees In Me"	Young; Christian Stalnecker; Josh Hoge; Kyle Fishman; Ray Fulcher	Young	3:46
6.	"Country Boy's Prayer"	Young; DeStefano; Michael Whitworth; Mitchell Tenpenny	Young; DeStefano	2:53
7.	"Double Down"	Derek George; Monty Criswell; Tyler Reeve	Young	2:55
8.	"Call It a Day"	Young; DeStefano; Weisband; Jon Nite	Young; DeStefano	3:04
9.	"Drink to Remember"	Young; Crowder; DeStefano	Young; Crowder	3:12
10.	"Don't Stop Now"	Young; Crowder; Reeve; Cole Taylor	Young; Crowder; DeStefano	2:56
11.	"Fall Out"	Young; DeStefano; Weisband; Nite	Young; DeStefano	2:49
12.	"Fire"	Young; DeStefano; Michael Hardy	Young; DeStefano	3:01
13.	"Gettin' Older"	Dave Fenley; Johnny Clawson; Kyle Sturrock	Young	3:37
14.	"Right Now"	Young; DeStefano; Hoge; Paul DiGiovanni	Young; DeStefano	3:04
15.	"Million Miles"	Young; Crowder; Cary Barlowe	Young; Crowder; DeStefano	2:59
16.	"Everybody Grew Up"	Young; Crowder; Reeve; Taylor	Young; Crowder; DeStefano	2:58
17.	"Knee Deep in Neon"	Young; Lindsay Rimes; Russell Sutton	Young; DeStefano	3:07
18.	"Down"	Young; Josh Osborne; John Byron; Ross Copperman	Young; DeStefano	2:50
Total length:				55:00

== Personnel ==
Vocals

- Corey Crowder – background vocals (track 2)
- Chris DeStefano – background vocals (tracks 1, 3, 4, 6, 8–12, 14–18)
- Hardy – background vocals (track 12)
- Wes Hightower – background vocals (tracks 5, 7)
- Julian King – background vocals (track 7)
- Emily Weisband – background vocals (track 1)
- Chris Young – lead vocals (all tracks), background vocals (track 2)

Musicians

- Jimmy Carter – bass (track 13)
- Dave Cohen – organ (track 7)
- Corey Crowder – acoustic guitar, banjo, bass (track 2)
- Chris DeStefano – acoustic guitar, banjo, bass, drums, electric guitar, keyboards, piano (tracks 1, 4, 6, 8, 9, 11, 12, 14, 17, 18), percussion (1, 6, 8, 9, 11, 14, 17, 18), pedal steel guitar (1), steel guitar (4, 6, 8, 9, 11, 14, 17, 18), violin (4)
- Kris Donegan – acoustic guitar (track 5)
- Joel Key – acoustic guitar (track 13)
- Julian King – percussion (track 5)
- Todd Lombardo – acoustic guitar (tracks 3, 10, 15, 16), banjo (16)
- Tony Lucido – bass (tracks 3, 5, 7, 10, 15)
- Chris McHugh – drums, percussion (tracks 3, 5, 10, 15, 16)
- Miles McPherson – drums, percussion (track 7)
- James Mitchell – electric guitar (track 13)
- Luke Moseley – keyboards (track 5)
- Sol Philcox-Littlefield – electric guitar (tracks 3, 10, 15, 16)
- Danny Rader – acoustic guitar, banjo (track 7)
- Michael Rojas – keyboards (track 13)
- Scotty Sanders – steel guitar (track 13)
- Justin Schipper – steel guitar (tracks 3, 10, 15)
- Derek Wells – electric guitar (tracks 5, 7)
- Lonnie Wilson – drums, percussion (track 13)
- Alex Wright – organ, piano, synthesizer (tracks 2, 3, 10, 15, 16)

Production

- Adam Ayan – mastering
- Jeff Braun – mixing (tracks 1, 6, 12, 14), programming (1, 6, 11, 12)
- Taylor Bray – engineering assistance (tracks 4, 6, 9, 12, 14, 17)
- David Cook – engineering assistance (tracks 3, 4, 10, 15, 16)
- Corey Crowder – editing, engineering, mixing, overdub engineering (track 2); programming (2, 3, 10, 15, 16)
- Chris DeStefano – editing (tracks 1, 4, 6, 8–12, 14, 15, 17), engineering (1, 4, 6, 8, 9, 11, 12, 14, 17, 18), overdub engineering (1, 3, 4, 6, 8–12, 14–18), programming (1, 10, 12, 15, 16)
- Scott Johnson – project coordination (tracks 1, 4, 6, 8, 9, 11, 12, 14, 17, 18)
- Jeff Juliano – mixing (tracks 3, 4, 8–11, 15–18)
- Nate Juliano – engineering assistance (tracks 3, 4, 8–11, 15–18)
- Kam Lutcherhand – engineering assistance (tracks 5, 7)
- Julian King – editing, engineering, mixing, overdub engineering (tracks 5, 7m 13)
- Zach Kuhlman – overdub engineering (track 2)
- Joel McKinney – engineering assistance (track 13)
- Alyson McPherson – project coordination (tracks 2, 3, 5, 7, 10, 13, 15, 16)
- Buckley Miller – editing, engineering, overdub engineering (tracks 3, 10, 15, 16)
- Taylor Pollert – engineering assistance (tracks 3, 15, 16)

== Charts ==
Chart performance for Young Love & Saturday Nights
Chart (2024)	Peak position
Scottish Albums (Official Charts)	64
UK Album Downloads (Official Charts)	42
UK Country Albums (Official Charts)	4
US Billboard 200	183
US Top Country Albums (Billboard)	34
