= Drowning (Chris Young song) =

Single by Chris Young

from the album Famous Friends
- Released: September 23, 2019
- Genre: Country
- Length: 3:09
- Label: RCA Nashville
- Songwriters: Chris Young; Corey Crowder; Josh Hoge
- Producers: Corey Crowder; Chris Young

Chris Young singles chronology
"Raised on Country" (2019)	"Drowning" (2019)	"Famous Friends" (2021)

Music video
- "Drowning" on YouTube

"Drowning" is a song co-written and recorded by American country music singer Chris Young. It was released on September 23, 2019, as the second single from Young's seventh studio album Famous Friends. Young wrote and produced the song with Corey Crowder, with additional writing from Josh Hoge.

== Background ==
Young wrote the song in tribute to one of his friends, Adam, who died in a car crash.

== Music video ==
The music video, directed by Jeff Johnson, was released on September 24, 2019. Young holds his late friend Adam's picture at first, before the video cuts to scenes from the Raised On Country World Tour 2019, held in Richmond, Virginia. Other people are also shown holding pictures of deceased family members.

== Commercial performance ==
As of January 2020, the song has sold 78,000 copies in the US.

The song reached No. 18 on the Hot Country Songs chart in 2019 and No. 25 on Country Airplay in 2020, becoming Young's first single to miss the top 20 on the latter chart since "Neon" in 2012.

== Charts ==
=== Weekly charts ===
Chart (2019–2020)	Peak position
US Bubbling Under Hot 100 (Billboard)	9
US Country Airplay (Billboard)	25
US Hot Country Songs (Billboard)	18

=== Year-end charts ===
Chart (2020)	Position
US Hot Country Songs (Billboard)	88

== Certifications ==
Region	Certification	Certified units/sales
United States (RIAA)	Platinum	1,000,000^{‡}
^{‡} Sales+streaming figures based on certification alone.
