= I'm Comin' Over (song) =

Single by Chris Young

from the album I'm Comin' Over
- Released: May 11, 2015
- Recorded: 2015
- Genre: Country
- Length: 3:17
- Label: RCA Nashville
- Songwriters: Corey Crowder; Josh Hoge; Chris Young
- Producers: Chris Young; Corey Crowder

Chris Young singles chronology
"Lonely Eyes" (2014)	"I'm Comin' Over" (2015)	"Think of You" (2016)

"I'm Comin' Over" is a song co-written and recorded by American country music artist Chris Young. It was released on May 11, 2015 as the lead single to his fifth studio album I'm Comin' Over, which was released on November 13, 2015. It is Young's only solo single from the album, as the album's next two singles "Think of You" and "Sober Saturday Night" are collaborations with Cassadee Pope and Vince Gill, respectively. The song was written by Young, Corey Crowder and Josh Hoge.

== Reception ==
=== Critical ===
The song received positive reviews from critics. Taste of Country reviewed the song positively, saying that "New Chris Young is doubling down on the traditional. "I’m Comin' Over" is drenched in weeping pedal steel and familiar country themes. The song relies on Young's sturdy voice, which is as solid as a mountain on this power ballad." In 2017, Billboard contributor Chuck Dauphin put "I'm Comin' Over" at number ten on his top 10 list of Young's best songs.

=== Commercial ===
"I'm Comin' Over" debuted on the Billboard Hot 100 at number 57 and Hot Country Songs at number 8 on its first week of release. It was the second best-selling country songs with 71,000 copies sold. It became Young's sixth number one single on the Country Airplay chart dated November 28, 2015, and his first since "You" in February 2012. The song was certified Gold by the RIAA on September 23, 2015, and Platinum on January 11, 2016. It has sold 725,000 copies in the US as of February 2016.

== Music video ==
The music video was directed by David McClister/Trey Fanjoy and premiered in May 2015.

== Chart performance ==
=== Weekly chart ===
Chart (2015–2016)	Peak position
Canada Hot 100 (Billboard)	57
Canada Country (Billboard)	1
US Billboard Hot 100	33
US Country Airplay (Billboard)	1
US Hot Country Songs (Billboard)	2

=== Year-end charts ===
Chart (2015)	Position
US Country Airplay (Billboard)	46
US Hot Country Songs (Billboard)	13

Chart (2016)	Position
US Hot Country Songs (Billboard)	59

== Certifications ==
Region	Certification	Certified units/sales
Canada (Music Canada)	Platinum	80,000^{‡}
United States (RIAA)	4× Platinum	4,000,000^{‡} / 725,000
^{‡} Sales+streaming figures based on certification alone.
