= Hangin' On (Chris Young song) =

Single by Chris Young

from the album Losing Sleep
- Released: March 5, 2018
- Recorded: 2017
- Genre: Country
- Length: 3:07
- Label: RCA Nashville
- Songwriter(s): Chris Young; Josh Hoge; Corey Crowder
- Producer(s): Chris Young; Corey Crowder

Chris Young singles chronology
"Losing Sleep" (2017)	"Hangin' On" (2018)	"Raised on Country" (2019)

"Hangin' On" is a song co-written and recorded by American country music artist Chris Young. It was released in March 2018 as the second single from his 2017 album Losing Sleep. Young and Corey Crowder both wrote and produced the song, with Josh Hoge as an additional writer.

== Content ==
The song is about attempting to catch the attention of a woman who has caught the narrator's attention from across a bar, and "hangin' on" to her words. Young performed the song on Good Morning America in August 2018.

== Critical reception ==
Markos Papadatos of Digital Journal rated the song 4.5 out of 5 stars, calling it "mid-tempo, refreshing and liberating."

== Charts ==
"Hangin' On" debuted at number 58 on the Billboard Country Airplay chart dated February 24, 2018, then fell off for two weeks before re-entering at number 52 on the chart dated March 17, 2018. It also debuted at number 43 on the Hot Country Songs chart dated October 21, 2017, following the release of the album. It re-entered the chart at number 45 on the chart dated March 17, 2018, following its release as a single. It ultimately peaked at number 2 on the Country Airplay chart dated November 3, 2018, having been blocked from the top by Luke Combs's "She Got the Best of Me"; it peaked at number 8 on the Hot Country Songs chart. Thus it became Young's first single to miss the number one spot since "Lonely Eyes" also peaked at number 2 in April 2015.

=== Weekly charts ===
Chart (2018)	Peak position
Canada Country (Billboard)	4
US Billboard Hot 100	63
US Country Airplay (Billboard)	2
US Hot Country Songs (Billboard)	8

=== Year-end charts ===
Chart (2018)	Position
US Country Airplay (Billboard)	27
US Hot Country Songs (Billboard)	33

== Certifications ==
Region	Certification	Certified units/sales
Canada (Music Canada)	Gold	40,000^{‡}
United States (RIAA)	Platinum	1,000,000^{‡}
^{‡} Sales+streaming figures based on certification alone.
