= At the End of a Bar =

Single by Chris Young and Mitchell Tenpenny

from the album Famous Friends
- Released: September 13, 2021
- Genre: Country
- Length: 3:06
- Label: RCA Nashville
- Songwriters: Chris Young; Mitchell Tenpenny; Chris DeStefano
- Producers: Chris Young; Corey Crowder

Chris Young singles chronology
"Famous Friends" (2021)	"At the End of a Bar" (2021)	"Looking for You" (2023)

Mitchell Tenpenny singles chronology
"Truth About You" (2021)	"At the End of a Bar" (2021)	"We Got History" (2022)

"At the End of a Bar" is a song by American country music singers Chris Young and Mitchell Tenpenny. The two artists co-wrote the song with Chris DeStefano. It is the fourth single from Young's eighth studio album Famous Friends. It's Young's eleventh and Tenpenny's first number one song on the Country Airplay chart.

== Content ==
Young and Tenpenny wrote the song in February 2021 during an ice storm in Nashville, Tennessee. The title came from Tenpenny recalling how he met Young.

Writing for Taste of Country, Billy Dukes stated that "What makes this new pairing a bit better [than "Famous Friends", Young's collaboration with Kane Brown] is the combined power of the two vocalists. Like Young, Tenpenny's vocals come with R&B inflections; in fact, they're very similar singers, with the most obvious difference being that the younger of the two Nashville-area natives brings the treble, while the veteran brings the bass."

== Charts ==
=== Weekly charts ===
Weekly chart performance for "At the End of a Bar"
Chart (2021–2022)	Peak position
Canada Hot 100 (Billboard)	97
Canada Country (Billboard)	10
US Billboard Hot 100	75
US Country Airplay (Billboard)	1
US Hot Country Songs (Billboard)	16

=== Year-end charts ===
2022 year-end chart performance for "At the End of a Bar"
Chart (2022)	Position
US Country Airplay (Billboard)	27
US Hot Country Songs (Billboard)	57

== Certifications ==
Region	Certification	Certified units/sales
United States (RIAA)	Gold	500,000^{‡}
^{‡} Sales+streaming figures based on certification alone.
