= I Didn't Come Here to Leave =

Studio album by Chris Young
- Released: October 17, 2025
- Genre: Country
- Length: 42:17
- Label: Black River Entertainment
- Producers: Chris Young; Andy Sheridan

Chris Young chronology
Young Love & Saturday Nights (2024)	I Didn't Come Here to Leave (2025)

Singles from I Didn't Come Here to Leave
- 1. "Til the Last One Dies" Released: April 7, 2025; 2. "I Didn't Come Here to Leave" Released: June 15, 2026

I Didn't Come Here to Leave is the tenth studio album by American country music artist Chris Young. It was released on October 17, 2025, by Black River Entertainment, his first release under the label. The album was produced by Young and Andy Sheridan. "Til the Last One Dies" and its title track were released as singles. A deluxe edition adding three additional tracks, including collaborations with Breland and Shaylen, was released on June 12, 2026.

== Track listing ==
I Didn't Come Here to Leave track listing
No.	Title	Writer(s)	Length
1.	"Some Around Here"	Chris Young; Chris DeStefano; Jason Duke; Josh Hoge	2:26
2.	"I Didn't Come Here to Leave"	Young; Dallas Davidson; Kyle Fishman	3:12
3.	"Good as Yours"	Young; Trannie Anderson; Jonathan Smith; Jordan Walker	2:34
4.	"I Hope It's Okay"	Young; Dave Fenley; Davis Forney; Austin Machado	3:18
5.	"I Feel a Cold One Coming On"	Young; Josh Gleave; Tyler Reeve; Trent Tomlinson	2:41
6.	"Til the Last One Dies"	Ben Hayslip; Seth Mosley; Walker	3:17
7.	"Pour Some Whiskey on It"	Young; Jessie Jo Dillon; Steven Lee Olsen; Jimmy Robbins	2:51
8.	"Boots on the Ground"	Young; DeStefano; Duke; Hoge	2:38
9.	"Tin Roof"	Trenton Michael Fisher; Ty Graham; Adam Wood	3:02
10.	"Dirt and Daisies"	Young; Casey Brown; Deric Ruttan; Parker Welling	2:56
11.	"Just Keep Living"	Young; DeStefano; Duke; Hoge	3:16
12.	"Jesus, Momma, Country Radio"	Young; DeStefano; Josh Phillips; Taylor Phillips	2:33
13.	"What Would You Take"	Steve Diamond; Doug Johnson	3:59
14.	"Brake Lights"	Young; Jesse Frasure; Ty Graham; Hillary Lindsey	3:28
Total length:			42:17

I Didn't Come Here to Leave deluxe edition track listing
No.	Title	Writer(s)	Length
15.	"If You're Lucky" (with Breland)	Young; Daniel Breland; Matt McVaney	2:36
16.	"One of Us" (with Shaylen)	Young; Ray Fulcher; Graham; Andy Sheridan	3:35
17.	"Wedding Band"	Tony Lane; Phillips	3:48
Total length:			52:17

== Charts ==
Chart performance for Young Love & Saturday Nights
Chart (2025)	Peak position
US Top Country Albums (Billboard)	50
