= Think of You (Chris Young and Cassadee Pope song) =

Single by Chris Young with Cassadee Pope

from the album I'm Comin' Over
- Released: January 25, 2016
- Recorded: 2015
- Genre: Country pop
- Length: 3:38
- Label: RCA Nashville
- Songwriters: Chris Young; Corey Crowder; Josh Hoge
- Producers: Corey Crowder; Chris Young

Chris Young singles chronology
"I'm Comin' Over" (2015)	"Think of You" (2016)	"Sober Saturday Night" (2016)

Cassadee Pope singles chronology
"I Am Invincible" (2015)	"Think of You" (2016)	"Summer" (2016)

"Think of You" is a song recorded by American country music singers Chris Young and Cassadee Pope. It was written and produced by Young and Corey Crowder, with additional writing from Josh Hoge. "Think of You" was released on January 25, 2016 as the second single from Young's fifth studio album, I'm Comin' Over (2015). The country pop song explores the reminiscence of a recent breakup.

"Think of You" peaked at number one on both the Country Airplay and Canada Country charts, earning Young his second consecutive and his seventh chart topper on each tally and earning Pope her first and only number one on either chart. The song additionally peaked at number two on the Hot Country Songs chart, behind "Somewhere on a Beach" by Dierks Bentley. "Think of You" reached number 40 on the Billboard Hot 100. The song was certified Platinum by the Recording Industry Association of America (RIAA) and has sold 513,000 copies in the United States. "Think of You" was nominated for Best Country Duo/Group Performance at the 59th Annual Grammy Awards.

== Background and composition ==
"Think of You" is a country pop song written in 2014 by Chris Young, Corey Crowder, and Josh Hoge. The midtempo ballad chronicles the break-up of a once-great couple, the awkwardness of adjusting to being on your own, and the untold fact between the two that they actually want to get back together. It was recorded by Young as a vocal duet with Cassadee Pope. Young chose Pope to serve as the female vocalist for the song after hearing her perform at the Stars and Guitars radio show hosted by WKIS 99.9 Kiss Country in Miami, FL. "I was just like, 'I've got to ask her,'" Young revealed to The Boot, "because I love her voice, and she's a phenomenal singer."

The song was first made available to digital retailers and streaming services on October 23, 2015 during the lead-up to the album's release. An accompanying lyric video premiered the same day. It was later selected as the album's second official single, being announced by the singers in a video posted to Young's official Facebook account on December 16, 2015. The song officially impacted country radio on January 25, 2016.

== Reception ==
=== Critical ===
Billy Dukes of country music blog Taste of Country praised both singers' vocal performances as well as the equability of the duet, writing that "too often country duets leave one wanting more from the featured artist... but thats not the case here." He described the song as "relatable, memorable and unforgettable." Jon Freeman of Country Weekly similarly complimented the vocal pairing and declared the song a "clear standout" on the album. In 2017, Billboard contributor Chuck Dauphin put "Think of You" at number six on his top 10 list of Young's best songs.

=== Commercial ===
"Think of You" debuted at number 37 on the Billboard Hot Country Songs chart dated November 14, 2015 following the song's digital release. The song sold 11,000 units in its first week of availability and entered the Country Digital Songs component chart at number 14. It entered the magazine's Country Airplay chart dated January 16, 2016 at number 58 upon its release as a single. On the Billboard Hot 100, it debuted at number 86 the week of March 6. Eight weeks later, it peaked at number 40 the week of April 29, and stayed on the chart for twenty weeks. The song has sold 513,000 copies in the US as of November 2016.

In Canada, the single debuted at number 92 on the Canadian Hot 100 chart dated March 26, 2016. It peaked at number 57 for two consecutive weeks, and remained on the chart for twelve weeks.

== Music video ==
The music video was directed by David McClister/Trey Fanjoy and premiered on Vevo on January 22, 2016.

== Charts ==
=== Weekly charts ===
Chart (2016)	Peak position
Canada Hot 100 (Billboard)	57
Canada Country (Billboard)	1
US Billboard Hot 100	40
US Country Airplay (Billboard)	1
US Hot Country Songs (Billboard)	2

=== Year end charts ===
Chart (2016)	Position
US Country Airplay (Billboard)	37
US Hot Country Songs (Billboard)	19

== Certifications ==
Region	Certification	Certified units/sales
Canada (Music Canada)	Platinum	80,000^{‡}
United States (RIAA)	2× Platinum	2,000,000^{‡} / 513,000
^{‡} Sales+streaming figures based on certification alone.
