= Aw Naw =

Single by Chris Young

from the album A.M.
- Released: May 13, 2013
- Recorded: 2013
- Genre: Country rock
- Length: 3:09
- Label: RCA Nashville
- Songwriters: Chris Young; Chris DeStefano; Ashley Gorley
- Producer: James Stroud

Chris Young singles chronology
"I Can Take It from There" (2012)	"Aw Naw" (2013)	"Who I Am with You" (2014)

"Aw Naw" is a song co-written and recorded by American country music artist Chris Young. It was released in May 2013 as the first single from his fourth studio album, A.M.. The song was written by Young, Chris DeStefano and Ashley Gorley.

The song received positive reviews from critics who praised Young's take on bro-country with strong production and tolerable lyrics. "Aw Naw" peaked at numbers three and four on both the U.S. Billboard Country Airplay and Hot Country Songs charts respectively. It also charted at number 45 on the Billboard Hot 100. It was certified Platinum by the Recording Industry Association of America (RIAA). It achieved similar chart success in Canada, peaking at number five on the Canada Country chart and number 50 on the Canadian Hot 100. The song was certified Platinum by the Canadian Recording Industry Association (CRIA).

An accompanying music video for the song, directed by Chris Hicky, features Young hanging out at a bar behind the beverage door of a convenience store.

== Composition ==
The song is in E Dorian, following a chord pattern of E-G-A.

== Critical reception ==
Billy Dukes of Taste of Country gave the song four and a half stars out of five, writing that "this country-rocker is a progressive, creative and well-written leap forward for the ultra-talented singer." Matt Bjorke of Roughstock gave the song a favorable review, calling it "a country song that sounds unlike the singer's previous catalog but not so different as to say he's chasing trends."

Kevin John Coyne of Country Universe gave the song a B− grade, saying that it is "a typical 2013 country party song that is easier to tolerate than most of the others because it's sung really well and at least sounds like it's been written and performed by people of legal drinking age." Jon Freeman of Country Weekly gave the song a C grade, writing that "you’ve heard this particular theme many times before and there’s nothing added to it here, but the earworm chorus is likely to generate spins on your favorite radio station."

== Music video ==
The video was directed by Chris Hicky and premiered in June 2013. It starts with Young and his band members at a convenience store and are attracted by three women. Young follows one of them behind a beverage door and is led to a bar and parties with them. It turns out to be a dream but as Young leaves with his band, the convenience store owner drinks from a skull and crossbones glass shot (implying that it actually happened).

== Chart performance ==
"Aw Naw" debuted at number 54 on the U.S. Billboard Country Airplay chart for the week of May 25, 2013. It also debuted at number 32 on the U.S. Billboard Hot Country Songs chart for the week of June 8, 2013. It also debuted at number 97 on the U.S. Billboard Hot 100 chart for the week of August 3, 2013. It also debuted at number 98 on the Canadian Hot 100 chart for the week of September 14, 2013. As of December 2013, the song has sold 561,000 copies in the US.

Chart (2013)	Peak position
Canada Hot 100 (Billboard)	50
Canada Country (Billboard)	5
US Billboard Hot 100	45
US Country Airplay (Billboard)	3
US Hot Country Songs (Billboard)	4

=== Year-end charts ===
Chart (2013)	Position
US Country Airplay (Billboard)	11
US Hot Country Songs (Billboard)	32

== Certifications ==
Region	Certification	Certified units/sales
Canada (Music Canada)	Platinum	80,000^{‡}
United States (RIAA)	2× Platinum	2,000,000^{‡}
^{‡} Sales+streaming figures based on certification alone.
