= Losing Sleep (Chris Young album) =

Studio album by Chris Young
- Released: October 20, 2017
- Genre: Country
- Length: 30:15
- Label: RCA Nashville
- Producer: Corey Crowder; Chris Young

Chris Young chronology
It Must Be Christmas (2016)	Losing Sleep (2017)	Famous Friends (2021)

Singles from Losing Sleep
- 1. "Losing Sleep" Released: May 29, 2017; 2. "Hangin' On" Released: March 5, 2018

Losing Sleep is the seventh studio album by American country music artist Chris Young. It was released on October 20, 2017 via RCA Records Nashville.

== Content ==
Young told Rolling Stone that the album's title track and lead single "is the most pop-leaning song I've ever done... But there's a lot of stuff on this record that's really traditional-leaning, too. My voice is unabashedly country, but I do think this is a very in-the-moment record." Young co-wrote every song on the album, collaborating with producer Corey Crowder on several.

== Critical reception ==
Rating it 4 out of 5 stars, Stephen Thomas Erlewine of AllMusic wrote that "Every element of Losing Sleep unfolds so easily, it feels inevitable, and it's so polished it can seem like nothing but mood music, but repeated plays reveal that this is more than atmosphere".

== Commercial performance ==
The album debuted at No. 5 on the Billboard 200 and No. 1 on the Top Country Albums chart, selling 32,000 copies (39,000 units including track sales and streams). It sold a further 7,200 copies in the second week. It has sold 117,000 copies in the United States as of April 2019.

== Track listing ==
All tracks are written by Chris Young, with additional co-writers as noted.

No.	Title	Writer(s)	Length
1.	"Losing Sleep"	Chris DeStefano; Josh Hoge	3:00
2.	"Hangin' On"	Hoge; Corey Crowder	3:07
3.	"Holiday"	Crowder; Cary Barlowe; Johnny Bulford	2:58
4.	"Radio and the Rain"	Hoge; Crowder	3:02
5.	"Where I Go When I Drink"	Tyler Reeve; Trent Tomlinson	3:32
6.	"She's Got a Way"	Barlowe; Crowder	2:53
7.	"Leave Me Wanting More"	Crowder; John Pierce	3:02
8.	"Trouble Looking"	Crowder; Liz Rose	2:35
9.	"Woke Up Like This"	Hoge; Crowder	3:10
10.	"Blacked Out"	Hoge; Jon Randall	3:09
Total length:			30:15

== Personnel ==
Adapted from AllMusic

- Cary Barlowe - background vocals
- Jake Clayton - cello, viola, violin
- Dave Cohen - Hammond B-3 organ, piano, synthesizer, Wurlitzer
- Terry Crisp - steel guitar
- Corey Crowder - programming
- Tony Lucido - bass guitar
- Miles McPherson - drums
- Carl Miner - acoustic guitar, hi-string guitar, mandolin
- Russell Terrell - background vocals
- Derek Wells - acoustic guitar, electric guitar
- Chris Young - lead vocals

== Charts ==
=== Weekly charts ===
Chart (2017)	Peak position
Australian Albums (ARIA)	33
Canadian Albums (Billboard)	22
Scottish Albums (OCC)	51
UK Country Albums (OCC)	6
US Billboard 200	5
US Top Country Albums (Billboard)	1

=== Year-end charts ===
Chart (2017)	Position
US Top Country Albums (Billboard)	71
Chart (2018)	Position
US Top Country Albums (Billboard)	41

== Certifications ==
Region	Certification	Certified units/sales
United States (RIAA)	Gold	500,000^{‡}
^{‡} Sales+streaming figures based on certification alone.
