= A.M. (Chris Young album) =

Studio album by Chris Young
- Released: September 17, 2013
- Recorded: 2013
- Genre: Country pop
- Label: RCA Nashville
- Producer: James Stroud

Chris Young chronology
Neon (2011)	A.M. (2013)	I'm Comin' Over (2015)

Singles from A.M.
- 1. "Aw Naw" Released: May 13, 2013; 2. "Who I Am with You" Released: January 20, 2014; 3. "Lonely Eyes" Released: August 25, 2014

A.M. is the fourth studio album by American country music artist Chris Young. It was released on September 17, 2013, via RCA Nashville. Young co-wrote six of the album's eleven tracks. The album includes the singles "Aw Naw", "Who I Am with You" and "Lonely Eyes".

== Critical reception ==
Professional ratings
Aggregate scores
Source	Rating
Metacritic	79/100
Review scores
Source	Rating
AllMusic	4/5 stars
American Songwriter	3.5/5 stars
Country Weekly	B+
Entertainment Weekly	B−
Roughstock	5/5 stars

A.M. garnered generally positive reception by music critics. At AllMusic, Stephen Thomas Erlewine told that the release was "steeped in modern vernacular," and showed Young "brightening up his sound by leaning on cheerful, chipper pop hooks and a production so gleaming it shows his reflection; he has even chosen to smile on his album cover for the first time ever." Lee Zimmerman of American Songwriter wrote that "In the hands of a wannabe, the aforementioned songs might sound somewhat cloying, but given Young’s rugged vocals and apparent reservoir of conviction, the emotions ring true." At Entertainment Weekly, they felt that Young "survives on his fourth album, but too often he falls into the "bro country" trap currently plaguing the genre." Bob Paxman at Country Weekly stated that it "disproves the popular belief that nothing good ever happens in the a.m. There’s plenty of good stuff here." At Roughstock, Matt Bjorke said that "Everything about A.M. screams star-making and with a hard core collection of fans who already help him headline venues across The USA, Chris Young's only destined for bigger things because of A.M.." In 2017, Billboard contributor Chuck Dauphin placed "Lonely Eyes" at number 4 on his top 10 list of Young's best songs.

== Track listing ==
No.	Title	Writer(s)	Length
1.	"Aw Naw"	Chris DeStefano; Ashley Gorley; Chris Young	3:09
2.	"Hold You to It"	Shane McAnally; Josh Osborne; Young	3:18
3.	"Lonely Eyes"	Johnny Bulford; Jason Matthews; Laura Veltz	3:39
4.	"Goodbye"	DeStefano; Gorley; Young	3:46
5.	"A.M."	DeStefano; Gorley; Young	2:55
6.	"Nothin' but the Cooler Left"	Michael Carter; Brandon Kinney; Cole Swindell	3:00
7.	"Who I Am with You"	Marv Green; Paul Jenkins; Jason Sellers	3:11
8.	"Text Me Texas"	Rhett Akins; McAnally; Osborne	3:28
9.	"We're Gonna Find It Tonight"	Akins; DeStefano; Young	2:52
10.	"Forgiveness"	Casey Beathard; Scooter Carusoe	3:31
11.	"Lighters in the Air"	Monty Criswell; Shane Minor; Young	4:09

== Personnel ==
The following list is adapted from the A.M. liner notes.

- Shannon Forrest – drums
- Paul Franklin – steel guitar
- Kenny Greenberg – electric guitar
- Tony Harrell – Hammond B-3 organ, keyboards, piano
- Aubrey Haynie – fiddle, mandolin
- Wes Hightower – background vocals
- Mark Hill – bass guitar
- Brent Mason – electric guitar
- Steve Nathan – Hammond B-3 organ, keyboards, piano, Wurlitzer
- Biff Watson – acoustic guitar
- Chris Young – lead vocals

== Chart performance ==
The album debuted at No. 2 on the Top Country Albums chart, and No. 3 at Billboard 200 with 53,000 copies sold. The album has sold 267,000 copies in the US as of October 2015.

=== Weekly charts ===
Chart (2013)	Peak position
Canadian Albums (Billboard)	10
UK Country Albums (Official Charts)	2
US Billboard 200	3
US Top Country Albums (Billboard)	2

=== Year-end charts ===
Chart (2013)	Position
US Top Country Albums	43
Chart (2014)	Position
US Top Country Albums	41

=== Singles ===
Year	Single	Peak chart positions				
Year	Single	US Country	US Country Airplay	US	CAN Country	CAN
2013	"Aw Naw"	4	3	45	5	50
2014	"Who I Am with You"	8	2	48	6	72
2014	"Lonely Eyes"	4	2	50	5	65

== Certifications ==
Region	Certification	Certified units/sales
United States (RIAA)	Platinum	1,000,000^{‡}
^{‡} Sales+streaming figures based on certification alone.
