= Losing Sleep (Chris Young song) =

Single by Chris Young

from the album Losing Sleep
- Released: May 29, 2017
- Recorded: 2017
- Genre: Country, Country pop
- Length: 2:58
- Label: RCA Nashville
- Songwriter(s): Chris Young; Chris DeStefano; Josh Hoge
- Producer(s): Corey Crowder; Chris Young

Chris Young singles chronology
"Sober Saturday Night" (2016)	"Losing Sleep" (2017)	"Hangin' On" (2018)

"Losing Sleep" is a song co-written and recorded by American country music artist Chris Young. It was released on May 29, 2017 as the first single from his 2017 album of the same name. Young co-wrote this song with Chris DeStefano and Josh Hoge, and assisted Corey Crowder in production.

== Critical reception ==
Billy Dukes of Taste of Country was somewhat critical of the song's arrangement, but wrote that the song is "sonically edgy and lyrically pointed," and that Young's performance comes across as "sincere." In a review of the similarly titled album, Matt Bjorke of Roughstock complimented the song's structure, writing that the juxtaposition of the "relaxed" verses and "frantic" chorus "is part of what makes the song work as well as it does and why it’s the anchor for this record." Jim Casey of Nash Country Daily wrote that the song falls in Young's "sexy-song wheelhouse" and praised the radio-friendly production.

== Music video ==
The music video was directed by Peter Zavadil and premiered on CMT, GAC & VEVO in September 2017. Filmed at the Omni Hotel in downtown Nashville, Tennessee, the video follows Young and a female love interest as they prepare for a date and then meet in the hotel bar. Mood lighting is used to establish a "romantic mood," with critics describing the video as "sexy."

== Commercial performance ==
"Losing Sleep" reached number one on the Billboard Country Airplay chart dated February 10, 2018, earning Young his ninth leader on the chart, and fourth consecutive number-one following the three singles released from previous album, I'm Comin' Over (2015). The song has sold 200,000 copies in the United States as of February 2018. "Losing Sleep" was certified Platinum by the Recording Industry Association of America in August 2018.

== Charts ==
=== Weekly charts ===
Chart (2017–2018)	Peak position
Canada Country (Billboard)	2
US Billboard Hot 100	60
US Country Airplay (Billboard)	1
US Hot Country Songs (Billboard)	7

=== Year-end charts ===
Chart (2018)	Position
US Country Airplay (Billboard)	40
US Hot Country Songs (Billboard)	49

== Certifications ==
Region	Certification	Certified units/sales
Canada (Music Canada)	Platinum	80,000^{‡}
United States (RIAA)	2× Platinum	2,000,000^{‡} / 200,000
^{‡} Sales+streaming figures based on certification alone.
