= Sober Saturday Night =

Single by Chris Young featuring Vince Gill

from the album I'm Comin' Over
- Released: June 6, 2016
- Recorded: 2015
- Genre: Country
- Length: 3:14
- Label: RCA Nashville
- Songwriter(s): Chris Young; Brad Warren; Brett Warren
- Producer(s): Corey Crowder; Chris Young

Chris Young singles chronology
"Think of You" (2016)	"Sober Saturday Night" (2016)	"Losing Sleep" (2017)

Vince Gill singles chronology
"Take Me Down" (2016)	"Sober Saturday Night" (2016)	"Me and My Girl" (2016)

"Sober Saturday Night" is a song co-written recorded by American country music singer Chris Young as a duet with Vince Gill. It was released in June 2016 as the third and final single from Young's 2015 album I'm Comin' Over (2015). Young wrote this song with The Warren Brothers and assisted Corey Crowder with production.

== Critical reception ==
The staff of Taste of Country described the song as both a "vocal showcase" and a "personal performance." The blog also noted that the contrast between the two vocalists' tones "makes the unlikely pair a compelling listen." In 2017, Billboard contributor Chuck Dauphin put "Sober Saturday Night" at number eight on his top 10 list of Young's best songs.

== Commercial performance ==
The song reached No. 4 on the Hot Country Songs, and No. 1 on the Country Airplay chart, making it Young's third consecutive number one, his eighth overall, and Gill's sixth number one and his first since "Tryin' to Get Over You" in 1994. It also reached No. 47 on the Billboard 100. It has sold 204,000 copies as of March 2017.

== Music video ==
A lyric video for the song was posted to Young's Vevo channel on November 6, 2015 during the lead-up to the album's release. The official music video was directed by David Poag and premiered July 14, 2016. Similar to the story told by the lyrics, the video depicts a man who appears to be recovering from a hangover but who is actually "adapting to a new normal" without the influence of alcohol, with the bar scenes implied to be flashbacks to the man's troubled past. It turns out that on a particular night, he saw his ex-girlfriend with another man and confronted them, causing the girl to storm off into her new boyfriend's truck. Unfortunately, since everyone had had too much to drink, the truck crashed, causing the girl and her boyfriend to pass away on impact. We see that the protagonist is visiting the grave of his former love, and it's been a month since the fateful night, after which he made a vow to stay sober.

== Charts ==
=== Weekly charts ===
Chart (2016–2017)	Peak position
Canada Country (Billboard)	3
US Billboard Hot 100	47
US Country Airplay (Billboard)	1
US Hot Country Songs (Billboard)	4

=== Year end charts ===
Chart (2016)	Position
US Hot Country Songs (Billboard)	87

Chart (2017)	Position
US Country Airplay (Billboard)	35
US Hot Country Songs (Billboard)	53

== Certifications and sales ==
Region	Certification	Certified units/sales
United States (RIAA)	Platinum	1,000,000^{‡}
^{‡} Sales+streaming figures based on certification alone.
