= Chris Young (album) =

Studio album by Chris Young
- Released: October 3, 2006
- Recorded: June–September 2006
- Genre: Neotraditional country
- Length: 36:15
- Label: Arista
- Producer: Buddy Cannon

Chris Young chronology
Chris Young (2006)	The Man I Want to Be (2009)

Singles from Chris Young
- 1. "Drinkin' Me Lonely" Released: July 17, 2006; 2. "You're Gonna Love Me" Released: March 26, 2007

Professional ratings
Review scores
Source	Rating
Allmusic	3/5 stars

Chris Young is the debut album by the American country music artist Chris Young, who in 2006 was a winner on the television singing competition Nashville Star. Released on Arista Nashville in 2006, the album produced two chart singles for Young on the Billboard Hot Country Songs charts: "Drinkin' Me Lonely" and "You're Gonna Love Me", which respectively reached No. 42 and No. 48, making this the only album of Young's career not to produce any Top 40 hits. However "Drinkin' Me Lonely" did reach Top 40 territory, peaking at number 38, for Media Base, which was the chart used by Bob Kingsley's "Country Top 40" at the time.

The song "Flowers" was originally recorded by its co-writer, Billy Yates, who released it as a single from his self-titled debut album in 1997. "Beer or Gasoline" was co-written by David Lee Murphy and Ira Dean, the latter of whom was bassist for Trick Pony.

== Critical reception ==
Thom Jurek of Allmusic rated the album three stars out of five, criticizing Buddy Cannon's "generic" production but praising the neotraditionalist country sound of the album as well as Young's voice.

== Track listing ==
No.	Title	Writer(s)	Length
1.	"Beer or Gasoline"	David Lee Murphy; Ira Dean; Kim Tribble	3:28
2.	"You're Gonna Love Me"	Ashley Gorley; Bryan Simpson	2:56
3.	"Drinkin' Me Lonely"	Chris Young; Larry Wayne Clark	3:19
4.	"White Lightning Hit the Family Tree"	Brice Long; Ronnie Rogers	3:52
5.	"Lay It on Me"	Young; Tim James	3:31
6.	"Burn"	Danny Wells; Lee Thomas Miller	3:04
7.	"Small Town Big Time"	Young; James	2:54
8.	"Flowers"	Monty Criswell; Billy Yates	3:00
9.	"Center of My World"	Young; Murphy	3:34
10.	"I'm Headed Your Way, José"	Dallas Davidson; James T. Slater	3:29
11.	"Who's Gonna Take Me Home"	Jim Collins; Tony Martin; Wendell Mobley	3:02

== Personnel ==
As listed in liner notes.

- Wyatt Beard - background vocals
- Pat Buchanan - electric guitar
- Buddy Cannon - background vocals
- Eric Darken - percussion
- Thomas Flora - background vocals
- Steve Gibson - electric guitar, 6 string bass
- Kenny Greenberg - electric guitar
- Rob Hajacos - fiddle
- Wes Hightower - background vocals
- David Hungate - bass guitar
- Paul Leim - drums
- B. James Lowry - acoustic guitar
- Randy McCormick - piano, keyboards
- Terry McMillan - harmonica
- Liana Manis - background vocals
- Phillip Moore - electric guitar
- Larry Paxton - bass guitar
- Gary Prim - piano, keyboards
- Hargus "Pig" Robbins - piano
- John Wesley Ryles - background vocals
- Scotty Sanders - steel guitar, dobro
- David Talbot - banjo
- George Tidwell - trumpet
- Jim Williamson - trumpet
- John Willis - acoustic guitar, electric guitar, nylon string guitar
- Lonnie Wilson - drums
- Curtis Wright - background vocals
- Chris Young - lead vocals

== Chart performance ==
=== Album ===
Chart (2006)	Peak position
U.S. Billboard Top Country Albums	3
U.S. Billboard 200	22

=== Singles ===
Year	Single	Peak chart positions
Year	Single	US Country
2006	"Drinkin' Me Lonely"	42
2007	"You're Gonna Love Me"	48
