= Tomorrow (Chris Young song) =

Single by Chris Young

from the album Neon
- Released: February 21, 2011
- Recorded: 2010–11
- Genre: Neotraditional country
- Length: 3:40
- Label: RCA Nashville
- Songwriters: Chris Young; Frank J. Myers Anthony L. Smith
- Producer: James Stroud

Chris Young singles chronology
"Voices" (2010)	"Tomorrow" (2011)	"You" (2011)

"Tomorrow" is a song co-written and recorded by American country music singer Chris Young. It was released in February 2011 as the seventh single of his career and the first from his 2011 album Neon. The song sold 30,000 digital downloads in its first week of release. Young wrote this song with Anthony L. Smith and Frank J. Myers.

== Background and writing ==
Young told Taste of Country that Frank J. Myers came into the writing session with the idea. "He was like, 'I was thinking about this at the gym,' and he played us like the first half of the verse." Young went on to say that all of the writers agreed that this was probably one of the best things any of them had ever written.

== Critical reception ==
Blake Boldt of Engine 145 gave the song a "thumbs up", saying that it "might be the most traditional song you hear on country radio in 2011." Amy Sciarretto of Taste of Country called it "a tender, lovelorn ballad that tugs unmercifully at your heart strings." Giving it four stars out of five, Matt Bjorke of Roughstock praised the production and Young's "pliable" singing. In 2017, Billboard contributor Chuck Dauphin put "Tomorrow" at number nine on his top 10 list of Young's best songs.

== Music video ==
The Music video premiered on April 11, 2011. Young confirmed with GAC that he filmed a music video, which was directed by Trey Fanjoy. It was his last video to feature him in a cowboy hat.

== Chart performance ==
"Tomorrow" debuted on the U.S. Billboard Hot Country Songs chart for the week of April 2, 2011, and it debuted at number 96 on the U.S. Billboard Hot 100 chart for the week of April 2, 2011. On the chart dated August 6, 2011, "Tomorrow" became Young's fourth consecutive Number One single.

=== Weekly charts ===
Chart (2011)	Peak position
US Hot Country Songs (Billboard)	1
US Billboard Hot 100	36
Canada Hot 100 (Billboard)	95

=== Year-end charts ===
Chart (2011)	Position
US Country Songs (Billboard)	4

=== Decade-end charts ===
Chart (2010–2019)	Position
US Hot Country Songs (Billboard)	40

== Certifications ==
Certifications for Tomorrow
Region	Certification	Certified units/sales
United States (RIAA)	3× Platinum	3,000,000^{‡}
^{‡} Sales+streaming figures based on certification alone.
