= Raised on Country =

Single by Chris Young

from the album Famous Friends
- Released: January 28, 2019
- Genre: Country
- Length: 2:56
- Label: RCA Nashville
- Songwriter(s): Chris Young; Corey Crowder; Cary Barlowe
- Producer(s): Corey Crowder; Chris Young

Chris Young singles chronology
"Hangin' On" (2018)	"Raised on Country" (2019)	"Drowning" (2019)

"Raised on Country" is a song recorded by American country music artist Chris Young. It was released on January 28, 2019, as the first single from Young's eighth studio album Famous Friends. It was originally intended to be the title track, but the album's release was delayed due to the COVID-19 pandemic, leading to it being retitled to Famous Friends. Young co-wrote the track with Corey Crowder and Cary Barlowe.

== Commercial performance ==
The song has sold 68,000 copies in the United States as of September 2019.

== Music video ==
The music video for "Raised on Country" was directed by Peter Zavadil and premiered on March 15, 2019. It shows Young and his band going into a recording studio to record the song, while the tension and pulses from the song create a strange windstorm all over Nashville and around Young and his band. The city of Nashville also seems to be "pouncing" along to the loud beats of the song. It was filmed at the 650 AM WSM studios inside the Gaylord Opryland Resort & Convention Center.

== Charts ==
=== Weekly charts ===
Chart (2019)	Peak position
Canada (Canadian Hot 100)	88
Canada Country (Billboard)	9
US Billboard Hot 100	54
US Country Airplay (Billboard)	5
US Hot Country Songs (Billboard)	10

=== Year-end charts ===
Chart (2019)	Position
US Country Airplay (Billboard)	20
US Hot Country Songs (Billboard)	42

== Certifications ==
Region	Certification	Certified units/sales
Canada (Music Canada)	Gold	40,000^{‡}
United States (RIAA)	Gold	500,000^{‡}
^{‡} Sales+streaming figures based on certification alone.
