= Drinkin' Me Lonely =

Single by Chris Young

from the album Chris Young
- Released: July 17, 2006
- Recorded: 2006
- Genre: Country
- Length: 3:19
- Label: RCA Nashville
- Songwriter(s): Chris Young; Larry Wayne Clark
- Producer(s): Buddy Cannon

Chris Young singles chronology
"Drinkin' Me Lonely" (2006)	"You're Gonna Love Me" (2007)

"Drinkin' Me Lonely" is the debut single by American country music artist Chris Young. It was released following his winning season 4 of Nashville Star. Young wrote the song with Larry Wayne Clark.

== Content ==
The song is a ballad about drinking alcohol at a bar to cope with the heartache of losing a girlfriend/wife.

== Critical reception ==
In his review of the album, Thom Jurek of Allmusic gave the song a positive review, saying that "By the time "Drinkin' Me Lonely'" comes up on the player, the album is in full swing. It's a song Merle Haggard would have been proud to write."

== Music video ==
The music video was directed by Warren P. Sonada and premiered in 2006.

== Chart performance ==
Chart (2006)	Peak position
US Hot Country Songs (Billboard)	42
