= Famous Friends =

2020 single by Chris Young and Kane Brown

Single by Chris Young and Kane Brown

from the album Famous Friends
- Released: November 20, 2020
- Genre: Country pop; country rock
- Length: 2:45
- Label: RCA Nashville
- Songwriters: Chris Young; Corey Crowder; Cary Barlowe
- Producers: Corey Crowder; Chris Young

Chris Young singles chronology
"Drowning" (2019)	"Famous Friends" (2020)	"At the End of a Bar" (2021)

Kane Brown singles chronology
"Worship You" (2020)	"Famous Friends" (2020)	"Memory" (2021)

Music video
- "Famous Friends" on YouTube

"Famous Friends" is a song recorded by American country music singers Chris Young and Kane Brown. It was released on November 20, 2020, as the third single from Young's eighth studio album of the same name. Young wrote and produced the song with Corey Crowder, with additional writing from Cary Barlowe.

== Background ==
In 2017, Young joined Brown for the duet "Setting the Night on Fire" on the deluxe edition of Brown's self-titled album.

At the 2020 CMT Music Awards, Young performed "Drowning" in honor of Brown, whose drummer, Kenny Dixon, was killed in a car accident in October 2019, during CMT Artists of the Year. Since then Young and Brown developed a friendship.

Young told to People: "Kane and I have gotten to know each other over the years, from him being on tours with me, from us writing together, from me guesting on his album in the past. All of this stuff came together. 'Famous Friends' is fun, it's super uptempo and I got to sing with my buddy Kane. All of this worked out as perfect as it possibly could on one song."

Rutherford, Hamilton and Davidson counties in Tennessee are referred to in the lyrics, as Rutherford and Hamilton are the home counties of Young and Brown, respectively, while Davidson is where Nashville is located.

== Commercial performance ==
"Famous Friends" reached number one on the Billboard Country Airplay chart dated July 17, 2021, becoming Young's tenth number one single, and his first since “Losing Sleep” in 2018, and Brown's sixth. In December 2021, it was declared by Billboard the number one Country Airplay single of the year.

== Music video ==
The music video was released on March 26, 2021, directed by Peter Zavadil. It was filmed in Gallatin, Tennessee, and included Young's and Brown's real-life friends, such as a firefighter, a dog walker, a teacher, a musician, and a cook, and footage of them performing on a housetop in Nashville.

== Charts ==
=== Weekly charts ===
Weekly chart performance for "Famous Friends"
Chart (2020–2021)	Peak position
Australia Country Hot 50 (TMN)	8
Canada Hot 100 (Billboard)	28
Canada Country (Billboard)	1
Global 200 (Billboard)	146
US Billboard Hot 100	21
US Country Airplay (Billboard)	1
US Hot Country Songs (Billboard)	2

=== Year-end charts ===
Year-end chart performance for "Famous Friends"
Chart (2021)	Position
Canada (Canadian Hot 100)	87
US Billboard Hot 100	69
US Country Airplay (Billboard)	1
US Hot Country Songs (Billboard)	5

== Certifications ==
Certifications for "Famous Friends"
Region	Certification	Certified units/sales
Canada (Music Canada)	3× Platinum	240,000^{‡}
United States (RIAA)	3× Platinum	3,000,000^{‡}
^{‡} Sales+streaming figures based on certification alone.
