= Neon (Chris Young album) =

2011 album by Chris Young

Studio album by Chris Young
- Released: July 12, 2011
- Recorded: 2010–11
- Genres: Neotraditional country; honky-tonk
- Length: 32:23
- Label: RCA Nashville
- Producer: James Stroud

Chris Young chronology
| The Man I Want to Be (2009) | Neon (2011) | A.M. (2013) |

Singles from Neon
- 1. "Tomorrow" Released: February 21, 2011; 2. "You" Released: September 12, 2011; 3. "Neon" Released: March 26, 2012; 4. "I Can Take It from There" Released: October 15, 2012

Neon is the third studio album by American country music artist Chris Young. It was released on July 12, 2011 via RCA Nashville. The album produced four singles with "Tomorrow", "You", the title track, and "I Can Take It from There". The album sold 72,830 copies its first week. Young co-wrote seven of the album's ten tracks.

== Critical reception ==
Professional ratings
Review scores
| Source | Rating |
|---|---|
| AllMusic | 4/5 stars |
| Country Weekly | 4/5 stars |
| Slant Magazine | 3/5 stars |

AllMusic's Stephen Thomas Erlewine praised the album for being able to deliver tracks that straddle the line between country and country pop, and allows Young to perform them with convincing delivery, concluding that "If Neon does anything, it proves that Young can manage this delicate balance all the while seeming like it's no trouble at all." Jonathan Keefe of Slant Magazine was mixed towards the album, saying that despite some interesting tracks and Young's vocal delivery, it consists of filler that lacks a viewpoint and could've been performed by anyone, calling it "committee-based songwriting at its worst." He concluding that "It's a shame, then, that most of the set finds Young fighting an uphill battle against some lackluster material." In 2017, Billboard contributor Chuck Dauphin placed three tracks from the album on his top 10 list of Young's best songs: "Neon" at number three, "You" at number five and "Tomorrow" at number nine.

== Track listing ==
| No. | Title | Writer(s) | Length |
|---|---|---|---|
| 1. | "I Can Take It from There" | Chris Young; Rhett Akins; Ben Hayslip | 2:38 |
| 2. | "Lost" | Young; Chris DuBois; Ashley Gorley | 3:12 |
| 3. | "Tomorrow" | Young; Frank J. Myers; Anthony L. Smith | 3:40 |
| 4. | "Save Water, Drink Beer" | Megan Connor; Ross Copperman; Jon Nite | 2:47 |
| 5. | "Neon" | Shane McAnally; Josh Osborne; Trevor Rosen | 3:45 |
| 6. | "Old Love Feels New" | Young; Brett James; Tim Nichols | 4:01 |
| 7. | "You" | Young; Luke Laird | 2:44 |
| 8. | "Flashlight" | Young; Robert Arthur; Johnny Bulford | 3:24 |
| 9. | "When She's On" | Monty Criswell; Shane Minor | 3:09 |
| 10. | "She's Got This Thing About Her" | Young; Cory Batten; Kent Blazy | 3:02 |

iTunes bonus tracks
| No. | Title | Writer(s) | Length |
|---|---|---|---|
| 11. | "I'm Gonna Change That" | Young; Tia Sillers | 3:10 |
| 12. | "Don't Leave Her (If You Can't Let Her Go)" | Young; Brice Long | 3:13 |

== Chart performance ==
=== Album ===
==== Weekly charts ====
| Chart (2011) | Peak position |
|---|---|
| UK Country Albums (Official Charts) | 16 |
| US Billboard 200 | 4 |
| US Top Country Albums (Billboard) | 2 |

==== Year end charts ====
| Chart (2011) | Position |
|---|---|
| US Billboard 200 | 144 |
| US Country Albums (Billboard) | 33 |
| Chart (2012) | Position |
| US Country Albums (Billboard) | 32 |

=== Singles ===
| Year | Single | Peak chart positions | | | | |
| Year | Single | US Country | US Country Airplay | US | CAN Country | CAN |
|---|---|---|---|---|---|---|
| 2011 | "Tomorrow" | 1 | — | 36 | — | 95 |
| 2011 | "You" | 1 | — | 34 | — | 66 |
| 2012 | "Neon" | 23 | — | 92 | — | — |
| 2012 | "I Can Take It from There" | 16 | 4 | 63 | 4 | 76 |
"—" denotes releases that did not chart

== Certifications ==
| Region | Certification | Certified units/sales |
|---|---|---|
| United States (RIAA) | Platinum | 1,000,000^{‡} |
^{‡} Sales+streaming figures based on certification alone.

== Personnel ==
Adapted from the Neon liner notes.

Musicians

- David Angell – violin
- Mike Brignardello – bass guitar
- David Davidson – violin
- Conni Ellisor – violin
- Shannon Forrest – drums
- Paul Franklin – dobro, steel guitar
- Kenny Greenberg – electric guitar
- Jim Grosjean – viola
- Aubrey Haynie – fiddle, mandolin
- Wes Hightower – background vocals
- Mark Hill – bass guitar
- Anthony LaMarchina – cello
- Betsy Lamb – viola
- Brent Mason – electric guitar
- Steve Nathan – organ, piano
- Mary K. Van Osdale – violin
- Carole Rabinowitz-Neuen – cello
- Pamela Sixfin – violin
- Alan Umstead – violin
- Catherine Umstead – violin
- Biff Watson – acoustic guitar
- Kristin Wilkinson – string arrangements, string conductor, viola
- Chris Young – lead vocals

Production

- David Bryant – assistant
- Jake Burns – assistant
- Rich Hanson – assistant
- Julian King – engineer, mixing
- Bob Ludwig – mastering
- Tammy Luker – production assistant
- Doug Rich – production assistant
