= The Man I Want to Be =

Studio album by Chris Young
- Released: September 1, 2009
- Recorded: 2008–09
- Genres: Neotraditional country; honky-tonk
- Length: 34:30
- Label: RCA Nashville
- Producer: James Stroud

Chris Young chronology
Chris Young (2006)	The Man I Want to Be (2009)	Neon (2011)

Singles from The Man I Want to Be
- 1. "Voices" Released: May 12, 2008; 2. "Gettin' You Home (The Black Dress Song)" Released: February 17, 2009; 3. "The Man I Want to Be" Released: November 16, 2009; 4. "Voices (re-release)" Released: July 19, 2010

Professional ratings
Review scores
Source	Rating
Allmusic	3.5/5 stars
Roughstock	(favorable)

The Man I Want to Be is the second studio album by American country music artist Chris Young. It was released on September 1, 2009 via RCA Nashville. The album includes the singles "Voices", "Gettin' You Home (The Black Dress Song)", and "The Man I Want to Be", all of which reached Number One single on the Billboard Hot Country Songs chart.

== Content ==
"Voices" was released in May 2008 as the album's first single. It peaked at number 37 on the Billboard Hot Country Songs chart, becoming Young's first Top 40 country hit. The album, originally to have been released in August 2008, was then delayed until September 2009. The second and third singles, "Gettin' You Home (The Black Dress Song)" and the title track, which were released in January 2009 and November 2009 respectively, both reached Number One on the country charts. In July 2010, Young re-released "Voices", his third consecutive Number One hit on the Hot Country Songs chart.

The album also includes cover versions of Waylon Jennings' 1987 hit "Rose in Paradise" (recorded here as a duet with Willie Nelson) and Tony Joe White's "Rainy Night in Georgia." In addition, "It Takes a Man" was previously a single in 2005 for Aaron Lines from his album Waitin' on the Wonderful.

== Track listing ==
No.	Title	Writer(s)	Length
1.	"That Makes Me"	Cory Batten; Kent Blazy; Chris Young	3:06
2.	"Voices"	Chris Tompkins; Craig Wiseman; Young	3:06
3.	"The Dashboard"	Monty Criswell	3:31
4.	"Gettin' You Home (The Black Dress Song)"	Batten; Blazy; Young	3:32
5.	"It Takes a Man"	David Frasier; Ed Hill; Josh Kear	3:32
6.	"The Shoebox"	Tom Hambridge; Jeffrey Steele	3:45
7.	"Rose in Paradise" (duet with Willie Nelson)	Stewart Harris; Jim McBride	3:47
8.	"Twenty One Candles"	Hill; Randy Houser; Mark D. Sanders	2:31
9.	"The Man I Want to Be"	Brett James; Tim Nichols	3:27
10.	"Rainy Night in Georgia"	Tony Joe White	4:13

== Personnel ==
- Eddie Bayers- drums
- Shannon Forrest- drums
- Paul Franklin- dobro, steel guitar
- Kenny Greenberg- electric guitar
- Tania Hancheroff- background vocals
- Aubrey Haynie- fiddle, mandolin
- Wes Hightower- background vocals
- John Hobbs- keyboards, piano
- Brent Mason- electric guitar
- Steve Nathan- keyboards, piano
- Willie Nelson- duet vocals on "Rose in Paradise"
- Biff Watson- acoustic guitar
- Glenn Worf- bass guitar
- Chris Young- lead vocals

== Chart performance ==
The Man I Want to Be debuted at number 6 on the U.S. Billboard Top Country Albums chart and number 19 on the U.S. Billboard 200. As of the chart dated February 26, 2011, the album has sold 418,528 copies in the US.

=== Weekly charts ===
Chart (2009)	Peak position
US Billboard 200	19
US Top Country Albums (Billboard)	6

=== Year-end charts ===
Chart (2009)	Position
US Top Country Albums (Billboard)	52
Chart (2010)	Position
US Billboard 200	151
US Top Country Albums (Billboard)	25

=== Singles ===
Year	Single	Peak chart positions		
Year	Single	US Country	US	CAN
2008	"Voices"	37	—	—
2009	"Gettin' You Home (The Black Dress Song)"	1	33	74
2009	"The Man I Want to Be"	1	48	81
2010	"Voices" (re-release)	1	53	86
"—" denotes releases that did not chart

== Certifications ==
Region	Certification	Certified units/sales
United States (RIAA)	Platinum	1,000,000^{‡}
^{‡} Sales+streaming figures based on certification alone.
