= The Man I Want to Be (song) =

Single by Chris Young

from the album The Man I Want to Be
- Released: November 16, 2009
- Recorded: 2009
- Genre: Country; CCM
- Length: 3:26
- Label: RCA Nashville
- Songwriters: Brett James; Tim Nichols
- Producer: James Stroud

Chris Young singles chronology
"Gettin' You Home (The Black Dress Song)" (2009)	"The Man I Want to Be" (2009)	"Voices" (2010)

Music video
- "The Man I Want to Be" on YouTube

"The Man I Want to Be" is a song written by Brett James and Tim Nichols, and recorded by American country music artist Chris Young. It was released in November 2009 as the third single and title track from his album The Man I Want to Be (2009). The song is about the singer wanting to change who he is to make amends to a former lover.

The song received positive reviews from critics who praised Young's vocal performance and James Stroud's production for saving the bland lyrics. "The Man I Want to Be" was Young's second of five consecutive number-one hits on the Billboard Hot Country Songs chart. It also peaked at numbers 48 and 81 on both the Billboard Hot 100 and Canadian Hot 100 respectively. The song was certified Platinum by the RIAA for selling over a million units in the United States.

An accompanying music video for the song, directed by Chris Hicky, features Young at a bus stop making a call to God through a phone booth to help him find his former girlfriend.

== Content ==
"The Man I Want to Be" is a moderate up-tempo country song. The song's male narrator describes the kind of "man [he] wants to be." The first verse finds him realizing that he hasn't been the man he should ("I've spent my whole life gettin' it all wrong") and describing that he wants God's help to change. In the second verse, he longs to have his old lover back, and for him to be the perfect man for her ("I wanna be the kind of man that she sees in her dreams").

== Critical reception ==
Juli Thanki of Engine 145 gave the song a "thumbs up," saying that while "some lyrics are a little too bland to be particularly moving," that "Young sells it, truly sounding as though he’s at the end of his rope and praying to anyone who’ll listen." Thanki also described Young's vocal performance as "slightly reminiscent" of Keith Whitley and "the best voice to hit commercial country since Josh Turner." Leeann Ward of Country Universe gave the song a B− rating, stating that while he "deserves lots of credit for a stellar vocal performance, solid contemporary country production and for being a generally inoffensive composition," the song itself has "lyrical and melodic weaknesses [that] are still impossible to overlook." In 2017, Billboard contributor Chuck Dauphin placed "The Man I Want to Be" at number one on his top 10 list of Young's best songs.

== Music video ==
The music video, which was directed by Chris Hicky, premiered on CMT on December 3, 2009. In the video, Young takes a seat next to a man waiting for a bus, who hands Young a quarter and advises him to make a phone call to God (rather than trying to call his girlfriend). Young then goes to a telephone booth, and while he makes his call, scenes of his former love interest lying in her bedroom are shown. A sign from God comes in the form of a large arrow in the bed of a passing pickup truck. He continues to follow signs, which lead him to a downtown coffee shop, where he meets his love interest on the sidewalk. The video ends with him making amends with her, while the man from the bus stop looks through the window of a passing Greyhound and smiles to himself.

== Chart performance ==
"The Man I Want to Be" debuted at number 58 on the U.S. Billboard Hot Country Songs chart for the week of November 28, 2009, and it debuted at number 98 on the U.S. Billboard Hot 100 chart for the week of March 27, 2010. On the chart dated May 22, 2010, "The Man I Want to Be" became Young's second consecutive Number One single.

=== Weekly charts ===
Chart (2009–2010)	Peak position
US Hot Country Songs (Billboard)	1
US Billboard Hot 100	48
Canada Hot 100 (Billboard)	81

=== Year-end charts ===
Chart (2010)	Position
US Country Songs (Billboard)	5

=== Decade-end charts ===
Chart (2010–2019)	Position
US Hot Country Songs (Billboard)	30

== Certifications ==
Region	Certification	Certified units/sales
United States (RIAA)	Platinum	1,000,000^{‡}
^{‡} Sales+streaming figures based on certification alone.
