= Who I Am with You =

Single by Chris Young

from the album A.M.
- Released: January 20, 2014
- Recorded: 2013
- Genre: Country
- Length: 3:11
- Label: RCA Nashville
- Songwriters: Marv Green; Paul Jenkins; Jason Sellers
- Producer: James Stroud

Chris Young singles chronology
| "Aw Naw" (2013) | "Who I Am with You" (2014) | "Lonely Eyes" (2014) |

"Who I Am with You" is a song written by Marv Green, Paul Jenkins, and Jason Sellers and recorded by American country music artist Chris Young. It was released in January 2014 as the second single from Young’s 2013 album A.M..

"Who I Am with You" peaked at numbers two and eight on both the Billboard Country Airplay and Hot Country Songs charts respectively. It also charted at number 48 on the Hot 100. The song was certified Gold by the Recording Industry Association of America (RIAA) and has sold 565,000 copies in the United States as of August 2014. It achieved similar chart success in Canada, peaking at number six on the Canada Country chart and number 72 on the Canadian Hot 100.

The accompanying music video for the song was directed by Trey Fanjoy.

== Reception ==
=== Critical ===
The song received a favorable review from Taste of Country, which called it "a subtle change to a formula that’s worked well" and "a stark contrast to more intimate lovers from previous records." The review stated that "Young’s voice adds depth and the necessary hurt to make the early lyrics stick."

=== Commercial ===
"Who I Am with You" debuted at number 60 on the U.S. Billboard Country Airplay chart for the week of January 25, 2014. It also debuted at number 49 on the U.S. Billboard Hot Country Songs chart for the week of October 5, 2013. It peaked at number 2 on the Country Airplay chart dated July 26, 2014, having been blocked from Number One by Joe Nichols' "Yeah". The song was certified Gold by the RIAA on July 18, 2014. As of August 2014, the song has sold 565,000 copies in the United States.

== Music video ==
The music video was directed by Trey Fanjoy and premiered in March 2014. It shows footage from Chris's 2013 tour, and him performing the song in his dressing room, as well as cuddling with a love interest there. All the dressing room shots are in color, while the concert and tour footage is in black and white.

== Charts and certifications ==
=== Weekly charts ===
| Chart (2014) | Peak position |
|---|---|
| Canada Hot 100 (Billboard) | 72 |
| Canada Country (Billboard) | 6 |
| US Billboard Hot 100 | 48 |
| US Country Airplay (Billboard) | 2 |
| US Hot Country Songs (Billboard) | 8 |

=== Year-end charts ===
| Chart (2014) | Position |
|---|---|
| US Country Airplay (Billboard) | 25 |
| US Hot Country Songs (Billboard) | 40 |

=== Certifications ===
| Region | Certification | Certified units/sales |
|---|---|---|
| Canada (Music Canada) | Gold | 40,000^{‡} |
| United States (RIAA) | 2× Platinum | 2,000,000^{‡} |
^{‡} Sales+streaming figures based on certification alone.
