= Voices (Chris Young song) =

Single by Chris Young

from the album The Man I Want to Be
- Released: May 12, 2008; July 19, 2010 (re-release)
- Genre: Country
- Length: 3:06
- Label: RCA Nashville
- Songwriters: Chris Tompkins; Craig Wiseman; Chris Young
- Producer: James Stroud

Chris Young singles chronology
| "You're Gonna Love Me" (2007) | "Voices" (2008) | "Gettin' You Home (The Black Dress Song)" (2009) |

Chris Young (2010) singles chronology
| "The Man I Want to Be" (2009) | "Voices" (2010) | "Tomorrow" (2011) |

"Voices" is a song co-written and recorded by American country music singer Chris Young. After charting in mid-2008 on the Hot Country Songs charts, "Voices" was re-released in July 2010 following Young's first two Number one singles, "Gettin' You Home (The Black Dress Song)" and "The Man I Want to Be." The song is included on his album The Man I Want to Be, as well as a digital extended play of the same title. "Voices" became Young's third-consecutive Number One hit for the chart week ending February 19, 2011. The song spent 20 weeks on the Hot Country Songs chart during its first run plus 31 more weeks in its second run during its rise to #1. The song was written by Young, Chris Tompkins and Craig Wiseman.

== History ==
At the 2008 CMA Music Fest, Young offered fans the opportunity to make personal recordings of dedications to special people in their lives. These fans received e-mails containing the song and the dedications.

Young told The Boot that he wanted to re-release it because it was popular with his fans. It was accompanied by a digital extended play of the same title, comprising that song and three cover songs, "to share with fans some of the musical voices that helped make me the man I am today."

== Music video ==
He has also recorded a music video for the song, directed by David McClister. The video includes members of his family.

== Critical reception ==
Kevin J. Coyne of Country Universe gave the song a B+ upon its original release, saying that Young's voice "is warm and sincere, and on the subject of voices" but criticizing the hook of the line "I hear voices all the time."

== Chart performance ==
"Voices" first charted in early 2008, before the release of Young's first Number One, "Gettin' You Home (The Black Dress Song)." It spent twenty weeks on Hot Country Songs and peaked at number 37. Upon its 2010 re-release, it debuted at number 56 for the chart week ending July 24, 2010. It also debuted at number 89 on the U.S. Billboard Hot 100 chart for the week of November 20, 2010. It also debuted at 86 on the Canadian Hot 100 chart for the week of March 12, 2011.

=== Weekly charts ===
| Chart (2008) | Peak position |
|---|---|
| US Country Songs (Billboard) | 37 |
| Chart (2010–2011) | Peak position |
| US Hot Country Songs (Billboard) | 1 |
| US Billboard Hot 100 | 53 |
| Canada Hot 100 (Billboard) | 86 |

=== Year-end charts ===
| Chart (2011) | Position |
|---|---|
| US Country Songs (Billboard) | 35 |

=== Decade-end charts ===
| Chart (2010–2019) | Position |
|---|---|
| US Hot Country Songs (Billboard) | 46 |

== Certifications ==
Certifications for Voices
| Region | Certification | Certified units/sales |
|---|---|---|
| United States (RIAA) | Platinum | 1,000,000^{‡} |
^{‡} Sales+streaming figures based on certification alone.
