= It Must Be Christmas =

Studio album by Chris Young
- Released: October 14, 2016
- Recorded: 2016
- Genres: Christmas; country
- Length: 34:00
- Label: RCA Nashville
- Producers: Corey Crowder; Chris Young

Chris Young chronology
I'm Comin' Over (2015)	It Must Be Christmas (2016)	Losing Sleep (2017)

It Must Be Christmas is the sixth studio album and first Christmas album by American country music artist Chris Young. It was released on October 14, 2016, by RCA Records Nashville. Young co-wrote two of the album's ten tracks. The album features collaborations with Boyz II Men, Brad Paisley and Alan Jackson.

== Critical reception ==
Professional ratings
Review scores
Source	Rating
AllMusic	3/0 stars

Stephen Thomas Erlewine of AllMusic rated the album three stars out of five. "[It] does everything a modern mainstream holiday album should do," writes Erlewine, "it plays upon memories of Christmas while appealing to the moment at hand." He added that the original songs "feel like radio tunes" rather than seasonal material. Chuck Dauphin of country music blog Sounds Like Nashville wrote a positive review in which he praised Young's "classic approach" to the holiday fare. "Whether it be a "New" classic or an evergreen one," he writes, "Young hits all the right notes on the album."

=== Commercial ===
Upon release, It Must Be Christmas debuted in the top five of the Billboard Top Country Albums chart at number four and also topped the Holiday Albums chart. The album has sold 74,100 copies in the US as of November 2017.

== Track listing ==
No.	Title	Writer(s)	Length
1.	"The Christmas Song"	Mel Tormé; Robert Wells	3:34
2.	"Christmas (Baby Please Come Home)"	Jeff Barry; Ellie Greenwich; Phil Spector	2:42
3.	"Under the Weather"	Chris Young; Corey Crowder; Josh Hoge	3:06
4.	"There's a New Kid in Town" (featuring Alan Jackson)	Don Cook; Curly Putman; Keith Whitley	4:09
5.	"Holly Jolly Christmas"	Johnny Marks	2:18
6.	"Have Yourself a Merry Little Christmas"	Ralph Blane; Hugh Martin	3:25
7.	"The First Noel" (featuring Brad Paisley)	Davies Gilbert; William Sandys	3:35
8.	"I'll Be Home for Christmas"	Kim Gannon; Walter Kent; Buck Ram	3:37
9.	"Silent Night" (featuring Boyz II Men)	Franz Xaver Gruber; Joseph Mohr	4:03
10.	"It Must Be Christmas"	Young; Johnny Bulford; Will Doughty	3:31
Total length:			34:00

== Personnel ==
Credits adapted from AllMusic.

Vocals

- Boyz II Men – featured vocals (9)
- Corey Crowder – background vocals
- Alan Jackson – featured vocals (4)
- Brad Paisley – featured vocals (7)
- Kristen Rogers – background vocals
- Chris Young – lead vocals, background vocals

Musicians

- Joshua Carter – string arrangements, strings
- Dave Cohen – Hammond B-3 organ, piano, synthesizer
- Josh Hoge – arranger
- Tony Lucido – bass guitar
- Miles McPherson – drum, percussion
- Carl Miner – acoustic guitar
- Brad Paisley – electric guitar
- Derek Wells – electric guitar

Production

- Zach Abend – digital editing
- Nick Autry – engineer
- Corey Crowder – producer, programming
- Billy Decker – mixing
- Jim DeMain – mastering
- Casey Henderson – mixing assistant
- Travis Hubert – assistant
- Naoki Kakuta – vocal engineer
- John Kelton – engineer
- Kam Lutcherhand – assistant engineer
- Kendall Marcy – guitar engineer, vocal engineer
- Amy Marie – mastering assistant
- Alyson McAnally – production assistant
- Keith Stegall – vocal engineer
- Chris Young – producer
- Brian David Willis – digital editing

== Charts ==
=== Weekly charts ===
Chart (2016)	Peak position
UK Country Albums (Official Charts)	7
US Billboard 200	48
US Top Country Albums (Billboard)	4
US Top Holiday Albums (Billboard)	1

=== Year-end charts ===
Chart (2017)	Position
US Country Albums (Billboard)	79
