= Gettin' You Home (The Black Dress Song) =

Single by Chris Young

from the album The Man I Want to Be
- Released: February 17, 2009
- Recorded: 2008
- Genre: Country
- Length: 3:33
- Label: RCA Nashville
- Songwriters: Cory Batten; Kent Blazy; Chris Young
- Producer: James Stroud

Chris Young singles chronology
"Voices" (2008)	"Gettin' You Home (The Black Dress Song)" (2009)	"The Man I Want to Be" (2009)

Music video
- "Gettin' You Home (The Black Dress Song) on YouTube

"Gettin' You Home (The Black Dress Song)" is a song co-written and recorded by American country music singer Chris Young. It was released in February 2009 as the second single from his 2009 album The Man I Want to Be (2009). Young wrote the song with Kent Blazy and Cory Batten. The song garnered positive reviews from critics who praised the suggestive lyrics for sounding sexy and for being a great non-sellout single.

"Gettin' You Home" became the first of Young's five consecutive number one hits on the U.S. Billboard Hot Country Songs chart. It also became his first Top 40 hit on the Billboard Hot 100 at number 33, and it peaked at number 74 on the Canadian Hot 100. The song was certified Platinum by the Recording Industry Association of America, and has sold 932,000 copies in the United States as of November 2015. It was nominated for a Grammy Award for Best Male Country Vocal Performance.

The accompanying music video was directed by Stephen Shepherd.

== Content ==
Songwriter Cory Batten suggested the lyric "all I can think about is gettin' you home" to his frequent songwriting partner Kent Blazy, who has written several songs for Garth Brooks. The two later met with Young and began working on other songwriting ideas. After a morning of little progress, the group decided to go to lunch. Once they had returned, the three friends began talking about their experiences with women. When Young elaborated on his own relationship, they decided to write a song about a woman who, despite getting dressed up for going out on a date, is "just as excited to get home" and have sex. According to Young, "Gettin' You Home" was written in "about 45 minutes".

== Critical reception ==
Karlie Justus of Engine 145 gave "Gettin' You Home" a thumbs-up rating. She described the song as "pleasingly radio-friendly without feeling like a sell-out, and it should catapult Young into the very small club of successful country reality competition winners." Kevin J. Coyne of Country Universe gave the song an A− grade. His review called it "suggestive without being sleazy." In his review of the album, Matt Bjorke of Roughstock said that the song "is sultry and sexy without ever feeling like it’s pandering to anybody. Also, despite the R&B grooves in the mix, the song is nothing but country." In 2017, Billboard contributor Chuck Dauphin put "Gettin' You Home" at number seven on his top 10 list of Young's best songs.

== Commercial performance ==
"Gettin' You Home" debuted at number 60 on the U.S. Billboard Hot Country Songs chart dated for February 28, 2009. It later debuted at number 91 on the U.S. Billboard Hot 100 in August 2009 and peaked at number 33 there. It became Young's first Number One hit on the Hot Country Songs chart dated for October 24, 2009. The song was certified Gold by the RIAA on August 13, 2010. It has sold 932,000 copies in the US as of November 2015.

== Awards and nominations ==
At the 53rd Grammy Awards, "Gettin' You Home" was nominated for Best Male Country Vocal Performance but lost to Keith Urban's "'Til Summer Comes Around".

== Music video ==
Directed by Stephen Shepherd, the video has Young waiting for his date to get ready for him to go out. The woman takes her scented candle bath as Young spends his time doing other things like making her bed, ordering some food when her refrigerator has nothing and lighting a few candles. The woman finishes her bath, puts her makeup on and puts on the 'titular' black dress for him to see. When she opens the door, she sees that Young is carrying a pizza box and a six-pack case of beer (meaning it's a night at her home). She smiles and she drops her dress to the floor. The music video premiered on CMT.

== Chart and certifications ==
=== Weekly charts ===
Chart (2009)	Peak position
US Hot Country Songs (Billboard)	1
US Billboard Hot 100	33
Canada Hot 100 (Billboard)	74

=== Year-end charts ===
Chart (2009)	Position
US Country Songs (Billboard)	12

=== Certifications ===
Region	Certification	Certified units/sales
United States (RIAA)	Platinum	932,000
