= Young Love & Saturday Nights (song) =

Single by Chris Young

from the album Young Love & Saturday Nights
- Released: October 2, 2023
- Genre: Country
- Length: 3:16
- Label: RCA Nashville
- Songwriters: David Bowie; Ashley Gorley; Jesse Frasure; Josh Thompson
- Producer: Chris DeStefano

Chris Young singles chronology
"Looking for You" (2023)	"Young Love & Saturday Nights" (2023)	"Til the Last One Dies" (2025)

"Young Love & Saturday Nights" is a song recorded by American country music singer Chris Young. It was released on October 2, 2023 as the second single from his ninth studio album Young Love & Saturday Nights. It was written by Ashley Gorley, Jesse Frasure, and Josh Thompson, and produced by Chris DeStefano.

== Content ==
The song was written by Ashley Gorley, Jesse Frasure, and Josh Thompson, and features additional credits by David Bowie due to it sampling the guitar riff from his 1974 hit, "Rebel Rebel". When Young was initially pitched the song, he immediately picked out the recognizable lick, but liked that it was an original effort outside of the sample: "This is different. This is creating something new, with a nod to something that pre-existed. And if you get the reference, it just made the song even cooler for you. Just to have a song that has David Bowie listed as a songwriter is amazing". The idea to lift the guitar riff from Bowie's song came following Warner Chappell Music buying his music catalog for $250 million in 2022, with the company asking one of its songwriters, Frasure, to see what could be utilized for new music with the recent influx of interpolations in country songs coming out of Nashville, citing singles by Cole Swindell ("She Had Me at Heads Carolina"), Morgan Wallen ("Everything I Love"), and Jake Owen ("I Was Jack (You Were Diane)", "On the Boat Again") as examples of the trend.

== Charts ==
=== Weekly charts ===
Weekly chart performance
Chart (2023–2024)	Peak position
Canada Country (Billboard)	38
US Billboard Hot 100	94
US Country Airplay (Billboard)	5
US Hot Country Songs (Billboard)	26

=== Year-end charts ===
Annual chart rankings
Chart (2024)	Position
US Country Airplay (Billboard)	7
US Hot Country Songs (Billboard)	65
US Radio Songs (Billboard)	54
