= I Can Take It from There =

Single by Chris Young

from the album Neon
- Released: October 15, 2012
- Recorded: 2011
- Studio: RCA Nashville
- Genre: Country
- Length: 2:38
- Label: RCA Nashville
- Songwriters: Chris Young; Rhett Akins; Ben Hayslip
- Producer: James Stroud

Chris Young singles chronology
"Neon" (2012)	"I Can Take It from There" (2012)	"Aw Naw" (2013)

"I Can Take It from There" is a song co-written and recorded by American country music artist Chris Young. It was released in October 2012 as the fourth and final single from his 2011 album Neon. The song was written by Young, Rhett Akins and Ben Hayslip.

== Critical reception ==
Billy Dukes of Taste of Country gave the song three and a half stars out of five, writing that "it’s a perfect radio track, but it’s not one of the best three Chris Young songs of all time." Matt Bjorke of Roughstock gave the song a favorable review, saying that "the melody of the opening track to Neon is pretty much stock and trade of most mainstream country studio sessions of the past 10-15 years but that doesn't mean this is a bad song for any song that has Chris Young singing is gonna rise above the pack." Ben Foster of Country Universe gave the song a B+ grade, writing that the song "illustrates how solid song structure and an inspired performance can lift standard country radio fodder from rote to memorable," calling it "a most delicious nugget of catchiness."

== Chart performance ==
"I Can Take It from There" debuted at number 48 on the U.S. Billboard Country Airplay chart for the week of November 3, 2012. It also debuted at number 48 on the U.S. Billboard Hot Country Songs chart for the week of December 1, 2012. It also debuted at number 97 on the U.S. Billboard Hot 100 chart for the week of February 23, 2013. It also debuted at number 95 on the Canadian Hot 100 chart for the week of April 6, 2013. It ultimately peaked at number 4 on the Country Airplay chart in April 2013, making it Young's first Top 10 country single to miss the Number One spot.

Chart (2012–2013)	Peak position
Canada Hot 100 (Billboard)	76
Canada Country (Billboard)	4
US Billboard Hot 100	63
US Country Airplay (Billboard)	4
US Hot Country Songs (Billboard)	16

=== Year-end charts ===
Chart (2013)	Position
US Country Airplay (Billboard)	39
US Hot Country Songs (Billboard)	59

== Certifications ==
Region	Certification	Certified units/sales
United States (RIAA)	Gold	500,000^{‡}
^{‡} Sales+streaming figures based on certification alone.
