= You (Chris Young song) =

Single by Chris Young

from the album Neon
- Released: September 12, 2011
- Recorded: 2011
- Genre: Country
- Length: 2:44
- Label: RCA Nashville
- Songwriters: Luke Laird; Chris Young
- Producer: James Stroud

Chris Young singles chronology
"Tomorrow" (2011)	"You" (2011)	"Neon" (2012)

"You" is a song co-written and recorded by American country music artist Chris Young. It was released in September 2011 as the second single from his third studio album Neon. Co-written with Luke Laird, the song is about a lover being told that her charm is the only thing that affects him the most. It received mixed reviews from critics who were critical of its lackluster hook and content similar to Blake Shelton's "Honey Bee" and Jason Aldean's "Big Green Tractor". "You" was Young's fifth consecutive number-one hit on the US Billboard Hot Country Songs chart. It also became his third Top 40 hit on the Hot 100, peaking at number 34. "You" was certified Platinum by the Recording Industry Association of America (RIAA), denoting sales of over one million units in the United States. It also garnered chart prominence in Canada, reaching number 66 on the Canadian Hot 100. The accompanying music video for the song, directed by Chris Hicky, was shot in black-and-white and shows Young as a gas station attendant attracting the attention of three different women in various colored clothing.

== Background and development ==
In this song, the narrator sings to his lover that no one else affects him the way she does. Young told Country Weekly that when meeting songwriter Luke Laird for the first time, Laird said, "let's just get a groove going and see what comes out." When they were finished, Young decided to call the song "You". Young decided to add lines about how the narrator's life "got a whole new direction" to make it more serious in tone. Both of them also called the song "simple and straightforward".

The main chord pattern on the song is A-F♯m7-Bm7-Bm7/E, which is performed three times on both verses followed by a C♯m7-Cm7-Bm7-Bm7/E pattern at the end of each verse. The chorus also uses the original pattern four times before ending on an A chord.

== Critical reception ==
The song received mixed reviews from music critics. Billy Dukes of Taste of Country described the song as "more sensual than sexy", and stated that the chorus was the most memorable part of the song. Kyle Ward of Roughstock gave the song a three-out-of-five star rating, stating that the song "does an OK job, it's clear that Young and co-writer Luke Laird intended [it] to be a charmer in the vein of Blake Shelton's 'Honey Bee' or Jason Aldean's 'Big Green Tractor', but it falls well short of [those] songs, in large part to a clumsy hook." Reviewing the album, Jonathan Keefe of Slant Magazine felt that this song, along with "Old Love Feels New" and "I Can Take It From There", had content too similar to other country songs and lacked a "distinctive point of view." In 2017, Billboard contributor Chuck Dauphin put "You" at number five on his top 10 list of Young's best songs.

== Music video ==
The music video was directed by Chris Hicky and premiered in October 2011. It features a black-and-white background, while several of the objects in the video (cars, clothes, etc.) are shown in color. In the video, Young is seen working as a gas station attendant. A woman in a red sports car pulls up, and Young fills her car up with gas, and washes it. Just then, a woman in a yellow car pulls into the gas station, and Young washes her windshield. As he places a tire in the back of a dark blue pick up, a third woman, in a turquoise-colored car, pulls into the gas station, and he puts air in her tire and checks her engine. At the end, Young puts a guitar in the back of the dark blue pickup (revealed to be his pickup), and drives away in it. He sees his three customers, and waves to them. Young is shown in his gas station uniform, playing guitar, throughout the video. This was also Young's first music video to not feature him wearing his trademark cowboy hat at any point in the video.

== Commercial performance ==
"You" debuted at number 60 on the Billboard Hot Country Songs chart dated September 10, 2011. It reached number one the week of February 10, 2012, staying on the chart for twenty-eight weeks. On the Billboard Hot 100, it debuted at number 85 the week of November 5, 2011. Fourteen weeks later, it peaked at number 34 the same week it reached atop the Hot Country Songs chart, remaining on the Hot 100 for twenty weeks. On April 29, 2016, "You" was certified platinum by the RIAA in the US, denoting combined sales and streams of over one million units. In Canada, the track debuted at number 96 the week of January 28, 2012, peaked at number 66 for two consecutive weeks, and stayed on the chart for eight weeks.

=== Weekly charts ===
Chart (2011–2012)	Peak position
Canada Hot 100 (Billboard)	66
US Hot Country Songs (Billboard)	1
US Billboard Hot 100	34

=== Year-end charts ===
Chart (2011)	Position
US Hot Country Songs (Billboard)	95

Chart (2012)	Position
US Hot Country Songs (Billboard)	11

=== Certifications ===
Region	Certification	Certified units/sales
United States (RIAA)	Platinum	1,000,000^{‡}
^{‡} Sales+streaming figures based on certification alone.
