= I'm Comin' Over =

Studio album by Chris Young
- Released: November 13, 2015
- Recorded: 2015
- Genre: Country pop
- Length: 35:56
- Label: RCA Nashville
- Producer: Corey Crowder; Chris Young

Chris Young chronology
A.M. (2013)	I'm Comin' Over (2015)	It Must Be Christmas (2016)

Singles from I'm Comin' Over
- 1. "I'm Comin' Over" Released: May 11, 2015; 2. "Think of You" Released: January 25, 2016; 3. "Sober Saturday Night" Released: June 6, 2016

I'm Comin' Over is the fifth studio album by American country music artist Chris Young. It was released on November 13, 2015 via RCA Nashville. The lead single, the title track, was released to radio on May 11, 2015. The track listing was revealed on October 14. Young co-wrote nine of the album's eleven tracks. The album's three singles all reached No. 1 on the Country Airplay chart.

== Reception ==
=== Critical ===
AllMusic's Stephen Thomas Erlewine described the album's overall vibe as "warm and slow", and said the strength of the album is "its mellow assurance, to which Young adds a shade of gravity with his gravelly voice, a touch of down-home flair that never seems affected". He gave the album four out of five stars, calling it the strongest of his career so far. In 2017, Billboard contributor Chuck Dauphin placed three tracks from the album on his top 10 list of Young's best songs: "Think of You" at number six, "Sober Saturday Night" at number eight and the title track at number ten.

=== Commercial ===
The album debuted at No. 1 on the Billboard Top Country Albums, the first No. 1 for Chris Young on the chart. It also debuted at No. 5 on the Billboard 200, with 57,000 copies sold (65,000 equivalent album units) in the US. It sold a further 19,000 copies in its second week. The album has sold 271,000 copies in the US as of May 2017.

== Track listing ==
No.	Title	Writer(s)	Length
1.	"Heartbeat"	Chris Young; Corey Crowder; Josh Hoge	2:55
2.	"I'm Comin' Over"	Young; Crowder; Hoge	3:17
3.	"Think of You" (duet with Cassadee Pope)	Young; Crowder; Hoge	3:38
4.	"You Do the Talkin'"	Cary Barlowe; Crowder; Liz Rose	2:59
5.	"I Know a Guy"	Benjy Davis; Brett Tyler	4:03
6.	"Alone Tonight"	Young; Crowder; Hoge	3:03
7.	"Sunshine Overtime"	Young; Crowder; Jeremy Stover	3:01
8.	"Sober Saturday Night" (featuring Vince Gill)	Young; Brad Warren, Brett Warren	3:14
9.	"Underdogs"	Young; Crowder; Hoge	3:05
10.	"Callin' My Name"	Young; Crowder; Jonathan Singleton	3:11
11.	"What If I Stay"	Young; Johnny Bulford; Hoge	3:25

== Personnel ==
- Nick Autry — engineer
- Dave Cohen — organ, piano, synthesizer
- Terry Crisp — steel guitar
- Corey Crowder — acoustic guitar, programming
- Billy Decker — mixing
- Vince Gill — electric guitar and background vocals on "Sober Saturday Night"
- Casey Henderson — production assistant
- Wes Hightower — background vocals
- Kam Luchterhand — production assistant
- Tony Lucido — bass guitar
- Alyson McAnally — production coordinator
- Miles McPherson — drums, percussion
- Carl Miner — banjo, bouzouki, acoustic guitar, mandolin
- Cassadee Pope — duet vocals on "Think of You"
- Matt Rausch — engineer
- Kristen Rogers — background vocals on "I Know a Guy"
- Jonathan Singleton — background vocals on "Callin' My Name"
- Bill Warren — production assistant
- Derek Wells — electric guitar
- Hank Williams — mastering
- Chris Young — lead vocals, producer

== Chart performance ==
=== Album ===
==== Weekly charts ====
Chart (2015)	Peak position
Australian Albums (ARIA)	36
Canadian Albums (Billboard)	11
UK Country Albums (OCC)	3
US Billboard 200	5
US Top Country Albums (Billboard)	1

==== Year-end charts ====
Chart (2016)	Position
US Billboard 200	67
US Country Albums (Billboard)	13

Chart (2017)	Position
US Country Albums (Billboard)	53

== Certifications ==
Region	Certification	Certified units/sales
United States (RIAA)	Platinum	1,000,000^{‡}
^{‡} Sales+streaming figures based on certification alone.
