= Neon (Chris Young song) =

Single by Chris Young

from the album Neon
- Released: March 26, 2012
- Recorded: 2011
- Genre: Country
- Length: 3:45
- Label: RCA Nashville
- Songwriters: Shane McAnally; Josh Osborne; Trevor Rosen
- Producer: James Stroud

Chris Young singles chronology
"You" (2011)	"Neon" (2012)	"I Can Take It from There" (2012)

"Neon" is a song recorded by American country music artist Chris Young. It was released in March 2012 as the third single and title track from his album Neon (2011). The song was written by Shane McAnally, Josh Osborne and Trevor Rosen. "Neon" received positive reviews from critics who praised the production, lyrics and Young's vocal performance. It stopped Young's five consecutive number-one hit run on the US Hot Country Songs chart, peaking at number 23. It also peaked at number 92 on the Billboard Hot 100. The song was certified Gold by the Recording Industry Association of America (RIAA), denoting sales of over 500,000 units in the United States.

== Critical reception ==
Billy Dukes of Taste of Country gave the song four stars out of five, writing that Young "plays with notes high and low like a cat plays with a ball of yarn, sort of batting them back and forth, always in control." Tara Seetharam of Country Universe gave the song an A− grade, saying that Young's voice "sinks into the groove of the song so effortlessly you’d think he was singing in his sleep, skating around the melody with an appropriate blend of conviction and restraint." Jonathan Keefe of Slant Magazine, reviewing the album, called it a strong track that uses "creative imagery to explain the seductive draw of a bar." In 2017, Billboard contributor Chuck Dauphin put "Neon" at number three on his top 10 list of Young's best songs.

== Music video ==
The music video was directed by Ryan Hamblin and premiered in May 2012. It was filmed at Melrose Billiards in Nashville, Tennessee.

== Chart performance ==
"Neon" debuted at number 54 on the US Billboard Hot Country Songs chart for the week of March 31, 2012. It also debuted at number 100 on the US Billboard Hot 100 chart for the week of August 11, 2012. With a peak of number 23 on the country music charts, it became Young's first single to miss the Number One spot since 2007's "You're Gonna Love Me" peaked at number 48.

Chart (2012)	Peak position
US Billboard Hot 100	92
US Hot Country Songs (Billboard)	23

=== Year-end charts ===
Chart (2012)	Position
US Country Songs (Billboard)	80

== Certifications ==
Region	Certification	Certified units/sales
United States (RIAA)	Gold	500,000^{‡}
^{‡} Sales+streaming figures based on certification alone.
