= Lonely Eyes (Chris Young song) =

Single by Chris Young

from the album A.M.
- Released: August 25, 2014
- Recorded: 2013
- Genre: Country
- Length: 3:39
- Label: RCA Nashville
- Songwriters: Johnny Bulford; Jason Matthews; Laura Veltz
- Producer: James Stroud

Chris Young singles chronology
| "Who I Am with You" (2014) | "Lonely Eyes" (2014) | "I'm Comin' Over" (2015) |

"Lonely Eyes" is a song written by Johnny Bulford, Jason Matthews and Laura Veltz and recorded by American country music artist Chris Young. It was released in August 2014 as the third single from Young’s 2013 album A.M.

== Content ==
This moderate-uptempo tune is about a guy who spots a beautiful girl in a bar and tries to get her attention.

== Critical reception ==
Taste of Country reviewed the single favorably, saying that "He has a brand. More than one song from Young's catalog captures the thoughts and feelings of a man sitting on a bar stool, or a man sending a message to a beautiful woman he hopes will respond in the affirmative. 'Lonely Eyes' does both. Each line of the chorus is little more than three or four words strung together, but this hook ties together two very arresting verses." In 2017, Billboard contributor Chuck Dauphin put "Lonely Eyes" at number four on his top 10 list of Young's best songs.

== Music video ==
The music video was directed by Adam Rothlein and premiered in December 2014.

== Commercial performance ==
It entered the Country Airplay chart on August 30, 2014; it debuted on the Billboard Hot 100 at No. 95 on January 3, 2015 and reached No. 70 on February 14, 2015. The song was certified Gold on April 17, 2015 by the RIAA. It had sold 470,000 copies in the US as of April 2015.

== Charts ==
| Chart (2014–2015) | Peak position |
|---|---|
| Canada Hot 100 (Billboard) | 65 |
| Canada Country (Billboard) | 5 |
| US Billboard Hot 100 | 50 |
| US Country Airplay (Billboard) | 2 |
| US Hot Country Songs (Billboard) | 4 |

=== Year-end charts ===
| Chart (2015) | Position |
|---|---|
| US Country Airplay (Billboard) | 11 |
| US Hot Country Songs (Billboard) | 39 |

=== Certifications ===
| Region | Certification | Certified units/sales |
|---|---|---|
| Canada (Music Canada) | Gold | 40,000^{‡} |
| United States (RIAA) | Platinum | 994,000 |
^{‡} Sales+streaming figures based on certification alone.
