= Chris Young (singer) =

American country music singer-songwriter (born 1985)

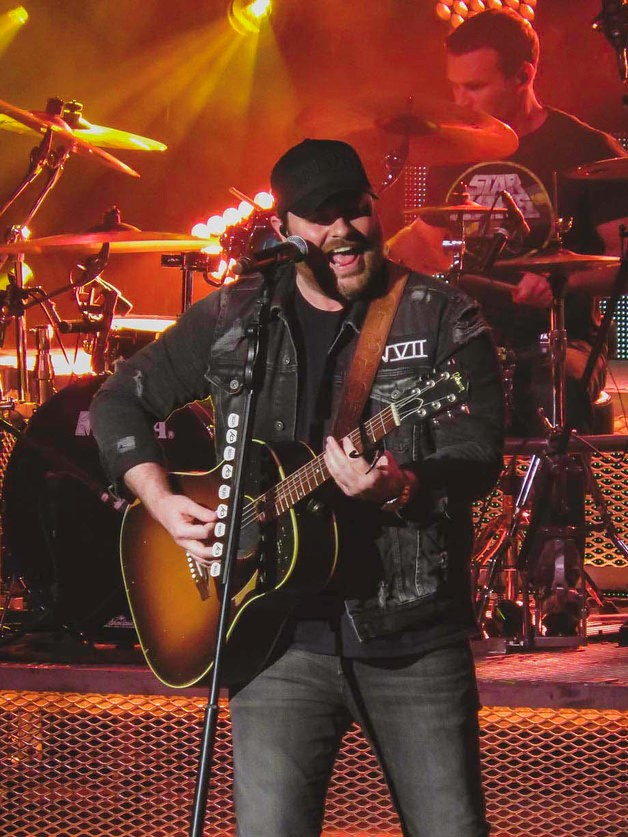
- Young performing in Durant, Oklahoma in 2017.

Background information
- Born: Christopher Alan Young; June 12, 1985 (age 41)
- Origin: Murfreesboro, Tennessee, U.S.
- Genres: Country
- Occupations: Singer; songwriter
- Instruments: Vocals; guitar
- Works: Chris Young discography
- Years active: 2002–present
- Labels: RCA Nashville; Black River Entertainment
- Website: chrisyoungcountry.com

Christopher Alan Young (born June 12, 1985) is an American country music singer and songwriter. In 2006, he rose to fame after winning season four of the reality singing competition program Nashville Star.

After winning, he was signed to RCA Records Nashville, releasing his self-titled debut album that same year. It produced two singles on Hot Country Songs with "Drinkin' Me Lonely" and "You're Gonna Love Me". His second album, The Man I Want to Be, was released September 1, 2009. It included the singles "Voices", "Gettin' You Home (The Black Dress Song)", and the title track, all of which went to number 1. Young's third album, Neon, produced two more number ones in "Tomorrow" and "You" in 2011 as well as the top 5 hit "I Can Take It from There" in 2012. The follow-up, 2013's A.M., produced three new singles with the top 5 hits "Aw Naw", "Who I Am with You", and "Lonely Eyes". His fifth album, I'm Comin' Over, was released on November 13, 2015. In 2017, Young gained one of the crowning achievements in country music, becoming a member of the Grand Ole Opry.

== Early years ==
Chris Young was born in Murfreesboro, Tennessee, on June 12, 1985. In his youth, he attended Trinity United Methodist Church. His grandfather Richard Yates was a performer on the Louisiana Hayride.

Young showed interest in music from an early age, performing in various children's theater productions. While attending Oakland High School, he sang in its choir and began playing in local clubs. In 2000, he performed with his high school's Winter Drumline in a performance, "A Night at the Palladium", where he was a mariachi singer. The group performed in the Winter Guard International Tournament in Ohio that year. In 2003, Young was a national YoungArts winner and Presidential Scholar of the Arts as part of the Presidential Scholars Program.

While attending college, he continued to tour, performing more than 150 shows a year.

== Career ==
=== 2005–2007: Nashville Star and self-titled debut album ===
In 2006, Chris Young was the house singer for Cowboys Dance Hall in Arlington, Texas. Park Scott and Keith Swan told him that he should audition for Nashville Star in Houston, Texas. He entered the show and won in 2006. His win earned him a contract with RCA Records Nashville and late that year, he released his debut single "Drinkin' Me Lonely". That song peaked at number 42 on the US Billboard Hot Country Songs chart and served as the first single from his self-titled debut album, which was produced by Buddy Cannon. The album's second single, "You're Gonna Love Me", peaked at number 48.

=== 2008–2010: Voices EP and The Man I Want to Be ===
In May 2008, Young released his third single, "Voices". At the CMA Music Festival in June, he promoted the single by emailing it to visitors at his Music Fest booth. In August, "Voices" became his first Top 40 entry on the Billboard charts, peaking at 37.

His second album, The Man I Want to Be, was released in September 2009. It was produced by James Stroud and includes cover versions of Waylon Jennings' "Rose in Paradise" (as a duet with Willie Nelson) and Tony Joe White's "Rainy Night in Georgia". In October 2009, Young's fourth chart single, "Gettin' You Home (The Black Dress Song)", became his first number 1 single. The album's title track was released in November 2009. Both it and a re-release of "Voices" went to number 1.

He was nominated for the 2010 Academy of Country Music Top New Solo Vocalist, alongside Luke Bryan and Jamey Johnson. He presented at the 44th Annual Country Music Awards on November 10, 2010. He was nominated for a Grammy Award for Best Male Country Vocal Performance for "Gettin' You Home".

=== 2011–2015: Neon and A.M. ===
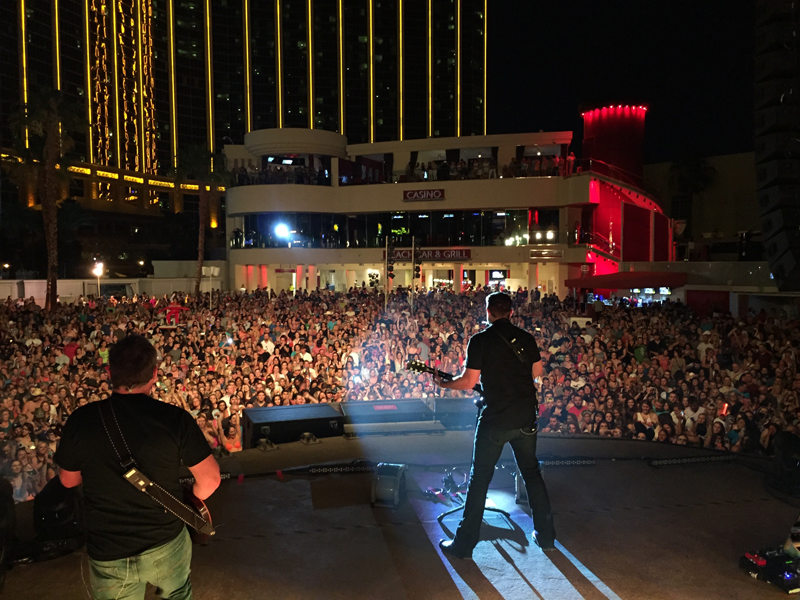
Mandalay Bay Beach Concert in 2015

Young released the single "Tomorrow" in February 2011. It became his fourth straight number 1. The album Neon was released in July 2011. The album includes his fifth consecutive number 1, "You", the title track, and "I Can Take It from There". In August 2012, "Tomorrow" became his first platinum selling single.

In 2013, Young served as an Ambassador for the CMA Songwriter's Series showcased in Belfast, Dublin, London, and Paris in an attempt to showcase country music overseas.

The first single from Young's fourth studio album, "Aw Naw", was released to country radio on May 13, 2013. It peaked at number 3 on the Country Airplay chart in November 2013. The album, A.M., was released on September 17, 2013. The album's second single, "Who I Am with You", was released on January 20, 2014. It peaked at number 2 on the Country Airplay chart in August 2014. The album's third single, "Lonely Eyes", was released to country radio on August 25, 2014. It reached number 2 on the Country Airplay chart in April 2015.

=== 2015–2016: I'm Comin' Over and It Must Be Christmas ===
On May 12, 2015, Young released a new single titled "I'm Comin' Over". It was the lead single from his fifth studio album of the same name, which was released on November 13, 2015. The same month, "I'm Comin' Over" became his sixth Number One single on the Country charts, and his first since "You" in February 2012. Young played the 14-show I'm Comin' Over Tour in late 2016 in support of the album. The album's second single, "Think of You" with Cassadee Pope, was released on January 4, 2016. It reached number one on the Country charts in May 2016. The third single, "Sober Saturday Night"—a duet with Vince Gill—was released on June 6, 2016. It hit number one on the Country Airplay in March 2017. Young released a country Christmas album, It Must Be Christmas, in October 2016.

=== 2017–2018: Losing Sleep and Grand Ole Opry induction ===
His sixth album's first single, "Losing Sleep" was released to country radio on May 12, 2017. Young announced the album was also titled Losing Sleep on August 23, 2017. It reached number one on the Country Airplay on February 10, 2018. The album's second single was "Hangin' On".

On August 29, 2017, Young was invited by country legend Vince Gill to become a member of the Grand Ole Opry. He was officially inducted by Brad Paisley.

=== 2019–2024: Famous Friends and Young Love & Saturday Nights ===
Young released "Raised on Country," the lead-off single to his seventh studio album, in January 2019. The album's second single, "Drowning," was released on September 23, 2019. "Famous Friends," featuring Young's friend Kane Brown, was released on November 20, 2020, as the album's third single. The album, also titled Famous Friends, was released on August 6, 2021.

"At the End of a Bar", featuring Mitchell Tenpenny, was released on September 13, 2021, as the album's fourth single.

In 2023, Young released the singles "Looking for You" and "Young Love & Saturday Nights". His ninth album Young Love & Saturday Nights was released on March 22, 2024.

=== 2024–present: Black River Entertainment and I Didn't Come Here to Leave ===
In December 2024, it was announced that Young had signed with Black River Entertainment after leaving his longtime record label RCA Nashville. He released his first single under the label, "Til the Last One Dies", in April 2025. On July 8, 2025, Young announced his tenth album I Didn't Come Here to Leave and released the title track. The album was released on October 17, 2025.

In November 2025, Chris Young announced It Must Be Christmas, his first holiday tour with new Christmas songs and acoustic shows.

In May 2026, Young announced an expanded edition of his album, I Didn't Come Here To Leave (Deluxe), which was scheduled for release on June 12, 2026.

== Personal life ==
On August 13, 2013, Young was en route to a tour date in Montana when he went into septic shock from a small cut on his leg which became infected. He was taken by ambulance to a hospital in Denver. The medical team immediately started Young on medication, and he had surgery on August 14 to treat the infection. Young returned home under his physician's care. As expected, his mobility was impacted by the surgery and his doctor requested he wait a full week post-surgery to resume touring. Young resumed on August 22.

In June 2014, Young cancelled a performance at the CMA Music Festival after accidentally cutting his left hand with a kitchen knife. The cut required surgery to reconnect tendons in the hand.

In January 2024, he was wrongfully arrested by a TABC agent after an altercation in a bar. The charges were then dropped.

In June 2026, Young opened a sports bar named Famous Friends in Nashville’s Midtown neighborhood.

== Philanthropy ==
Young has supported Little Kids Rock by donating various items to the organization for auction, raising money to put instruments in the hands of children. He has been a major supporter for Stars For Stripes raising $35,000 for the organization. He supports St. Jude Children's Hospital, and has raised money for it by sponsoring a tree at the Gaylord Opryland Resort's Annual Hall of Trees. On September 8, 2014, Young donated $25,000 of his own money, along with $5,000 from his fan club, to the Nashville School of Arts. In late August 2017 he created a fundraising site for Houston to help with the massive flooding caused by Hurricane Harvey.

On October 4, 2018, Young donated $5000 to a GoFundMe page to help pay for cataract surgery for a dog named Granola. He donated the money after a fan reached out to him on Twitter asking him for help marketing the GoFundMe project.

== Discography ==
Studio albums

- Chris Young (2006)
- The Man I Want to Be (2009)
- Neon (2011)
- A.M. (2013)
- I'm Comin' Over (2015)
- It Must Be Christmas (2016)
- Losing Sleep (2017)
- Famous Friends (2021)
- Young Love & Saturday Nights (2024)
- I Didn't Come Here to Leave (2025)

== Television ==
- Barmageddon
