= Josh Hoge =

- Born: Franklin, Tennessee, United States
- Occupation: Songwriter

Josh Hoge is an American songwriter from Franklin, Tennessee, United States. Named SESAC Songwriter of the Year in 2016, Hoge has penned hit singles for Chris Young such as "Think of You", and "I'm Comin' Over" along with charting singles for Kane Brown like "Used to Love You Sober" and "Thunder in the Rain".

== Songwriting discography ==
Year	Artist	Album	Song title	Co Writers
2009	Backstreet Boys	This Is Us	"Undone"	Troy Johnson, Ryan Tedder
2013	Randy Rogers Band	Trouble	"Flash Flood"	Randy Rogers Band, Brad Tursi
2013	Justin Moore	Off The Beaten Path	"Old Habits"	Adam Hambrick, Brian Maher
2014	Emerson Hart	Beauty In Disrepair	"Hurricane"	Emerson Hart, David Hodges
2014	Emerson Hart	Beauty In Disrepair	"The Wire"	Emerson Hart, David Hodges
2015	Chris Young	I'm Comin' Over	"Think of You"	Corey Crowder, Chris Young
2015	Chris Young	I'm Comin' Over	"Alone Tonight"	Corey Crowder, Chris Young
2015	Chris Young	I'm Comin' Over	"What If I Stay"	Johnny Bulford, Chris Young
2015	Chris Young	I'm Comin' Over	"Underdogs"	Corey Crowder, Chris Young
2015	Chris Young	I'm Comin' Over	"Heartbeat"	Corey Crowder, Chris Young
2015	Chris Young	I'm Comin' Over	"I'm Coming' Over	Corey Crowder, Chris Young
2015	Josh Abbott Band	Front Row Seat	"Born To Break Your Heart"	Blake Chaffin, Dave Fenley, Brett Tyler
2015	Kane Brown	Chapter 1	"Used to Love You Sober"	Kane Brown, Matt McVaney
2015	Kane Brown	Chapter 1	"Excuses"	Kane Brown, Matt McVaney
2015	Kane Brown	Chapter 1	"There Goes My Everything"	Kane Brown, Matt McVaney, Chris Young
2016	Kane Brown	Kane Brown	"Thunder In The Rain"	Kane Brown, Matt McVaney
2016	Kane Brown	Kane Brown	"Comeback"	Mark Fuhrer, Matt McVaney, Chris Young
2021	Gary LeVox	The Distance - Single	"The Distance"	Gary LeVox, Matt McVaney
