= Sam Hunt discography =

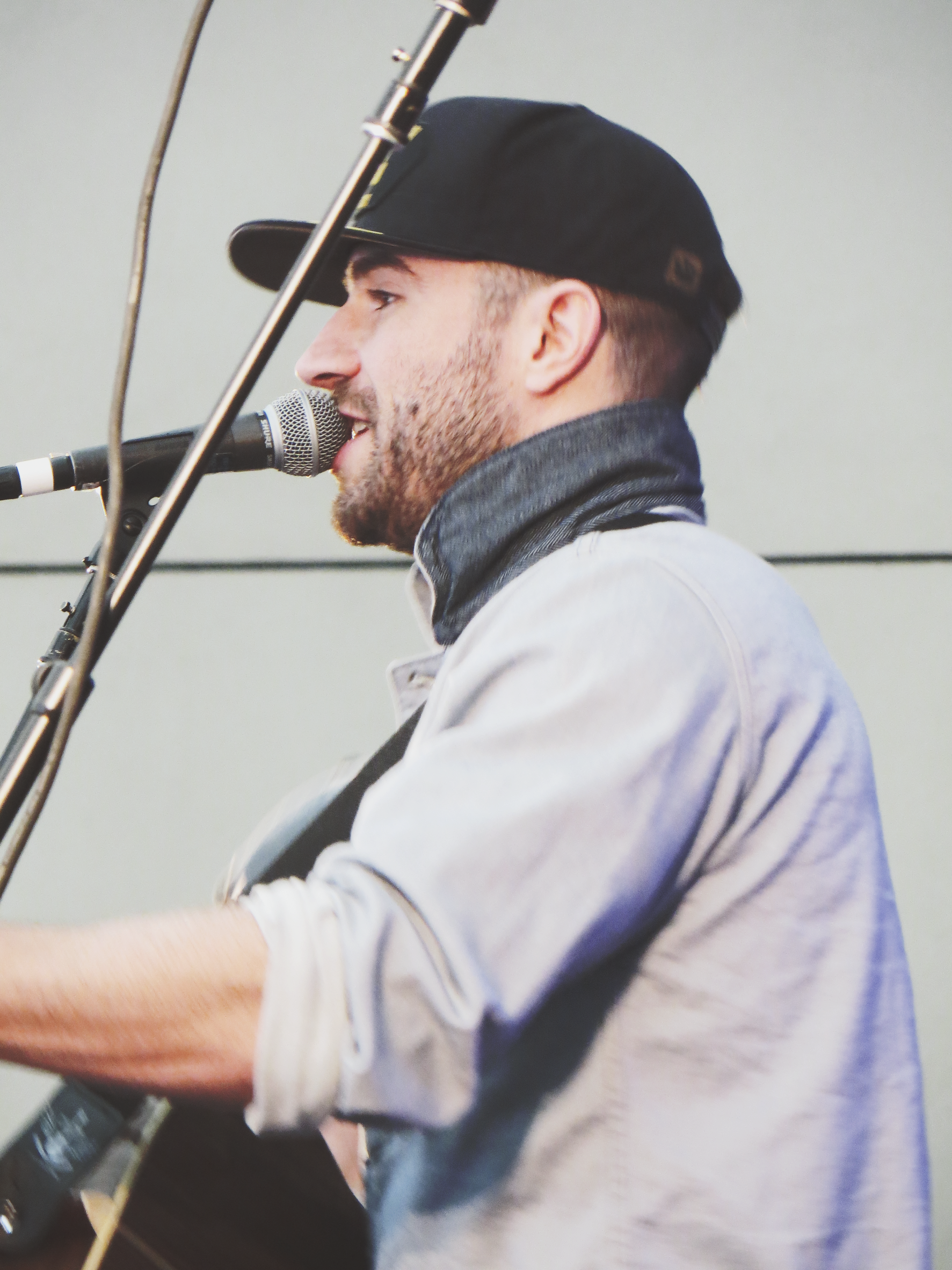
- Hunt performing at C2C Festival in London's O2 Arena, 2015
- Studio albums: 2
- EPs: 3
- Singles: 10
- Music videos: 10
- Mixtapes: 1
- Other charted songs: 8
- No. 1 singles: 7

American country music singer Sam Hunt has released two studio albums, one mixtape, three extended plays, ten singles, and ten music videos. Hunt signed a record deal with MCA Nashville and launched his musical career with the release of the single "Raised on It" in 2013; it received moderate chart success, peaking at number 49 on Hot Country Songs. Then came the launch of his debut studio album Montevallo in October 2014. It topped the Top Country Albums chart and peaked at number three on the Billboard 200. It was certified 4× Platinum by the Recording Industry Association of America (RIAA) and reached a million sales in the country by February 2016. The album also peaked at number two on the Canadian Albums Chart and received a Gold certification from Music Canada. Montevallo spawned five singles, including the international hit "Take Your Time", which peaked at number 20 on the Billboard Hot 100 and topped Hot Country Songs; it was later certified 6× Platinum by the RIAA.

== Albums ==
=== Studio albums ===
Title	Details	Peak chart positions								Sales	Certifications
Title	Details	US	US Country	AUS	BEL (FL)	CAN	ITA	NLD	UK	Sales	Certifications
Montevallo	Release date: October 27, 2014; Label: MCA Nashville; Format: CD, digital download, vinyl, cassette, streaming	3	1	—	167	2	83	60	93	US: 1,292,400	RIAA: 4× Platinum; MC: 3× Platinum; RMNZ: Platinum
Southside	Release date: April 3, 2020; Label: MCA Nashville; Format: CD, digital download, vinyl, streaming	5	1	41	—	4	—	—	—	US: 16,000	RIAA: 2× Platinum; MC: 2× Platinum; RMNZ: Gold

=== Mixtapes ===
Title	Details	Peak chart positions			Sales
Title	Details	US	US Country	CAN	Sales
Between the Pines	Release date: October 27, 2015; Label: MCA Nashville, Out in It; Format: CD, vinyl, digital download	31	7	80	US: 34,000

== Extended plays ==
Title	Details	Peak chart positions		Sales
Title	Details	US	US Country	Sales
X2C	Release date: August 12, 2014; Label: MCA Nashville; Format: Digital download	36	5	US: 31,000
Spotify Sessions	Release date: February 3, 2015; Label: MCA Nashville; Format: Streaming	—	—	
Spotify Sessions II	Release date: 2015; Label: MCA Nashville; Format: Streaming	—	—	
Locked Up	Release date: April 5, 2024; Label: MCA Nashville; Format: Digital download	—	—	

== Singles ==
=== As lead artist ===
Title	Year	Peak chart positions										Certifications	Album
Title	Year	US	US Country Songs	US Country Airplay	US Adult Pop	AUS	BEL (FL)	CAN	CAN Country	ITA	NLD	Certifications	Album
"Leave the Night On"	2014	30	1	1	—	—	—	54	1	—	—	RIAA: 4× Platinum; MC: 3× Platinum	Montevallo
"Take Your Time"	2014	20	1	1	12	—	21	28	2	13	10	RIAA: 7× Platinum; FIMI: 2× Platinum; MC: 7× Platinum; RMNZ: Platinum	Montevallo
"House Party"	2015	26	1	1	—	—	—	34	2	—	—	RIAA: 6× Platinum; MC: Platinum; RMNZ: Platinum	Montevallo
"Break Up in a Small Town"	2015	29	2	2	—	—	—	43	3	—	—	RIAA: 6× Platinum; MC: 5× Platinum; RMNZ: Gold	Montevallo
"Make You Miss Me"	2016	45	2	1	—	—	—	67	2	—	—	RIAA: 3× Platinum; MC: 3× Platinum	Montevallo
"Body Like a Back Road"	2017	6	1	1	6	9	—	16	1	—	—	RIAA: 11× Platinum; ARIA: 6× Platinum; BPI: Gold; MC: Diamond; RMNZ: 5× Platinum	Southside
"Downtown's Dead"	2018	94	14	15	—	—	—	67	22	—	—	RIAA: Gold; MC: Platinum	Southside
"Kinfolks"	2019	34	3	1	—	—	—	70	2	—	—	RIAA: 2× Platinum; MC: 2× Platinum	Southside
"Hard to Forget"	2020	26	3	1	—	—	—	32	2	—	—	RIAA: 2× Platinum; MC: 3× Platinum	Southside
"Breaking Up Was Easy in the 90s"	2020	32	4	1	—	—	—	48	3	—	—	RIAA: Platinum; MC: Platinum	Southside
"Wishful Drinking" (with Ingrid Andress)	2021	47	11	4	—	—	—	—	8	—	—	RIAA: Platinum; MC: Gold	Good Person
"23"	2021	50	10	1	—	—	—	57	1	—	—	RIAA: Platinum; MC: Platinum	Non-album singles
"Water Under the Bridge"	2022	— (Note: "Water Under the Bridge" did not enter the Billboard Hot 100, but peaked at number 10 on the Bubbling Under Hot 100 chart.)	27	15	—	—	—	—	33	—	—	RIAA: Gold; MC: Gold	Non-album singles
"Outskirts"	2023	66	14	1	—	—	—	96	1	—	—	RIAA: Platinum; MC: Gold	Locked Up
"Country House"	2024	98	27	2	—	—	—	—	9	—	—		Locked Up
"—" denotes a release that did not chart or were not released on that territory.

=== As featured artist ===
Title	Year	Peak chart positions	Certifications	Album
Title	Year	NZ Hot	Certifications	Album
"When Was It Over?" (Sasha Alex Sloan featuring Sam Hunt)	2021	8	MC: Gold	Non-album single

=== Promotional singles ===
Title	Year	Peak chart positions				Sales	Certifications	Album
Title	Year	US	US Country Songs	US Country Airplay	CAN	Sales	Certifications	Album
"Raised on It" (Note: "Raised on It" was released as an independent single in 2013, but was later included on Montevallo.)	2013	—	49	41 (Note: Appeared on Country Airplay chart in 2016 due to unsolicited airplay.)	—	US: 94,000	RIAA: Gold; MC: Platinum	Montevallo
"Drinkin' Too Much"	2017	89	16	—	65		MC: Gold	Southside
"Sinning with You"	2020	— (Note: "Sinning with You" did not enter the Billboard Hot 100, but peaked at number 18 on the Bubbling Under Hot 100 chart.)	27	—	— (Note: "Sinning with You" did not enter the Canadian Hot 100, but peaked at number 38 on the Hot Canadian Digital Song Sales chart.)			Southside
"Start Nowhere"	2022	—	—	—	—			Non-album singles
"Walmart"	2023	—	—	—	—			Non-album singles
"Women in My Life"	2023	—	—	—	—			Non-album singles
"Came the Closest"	2023	—	—	—	—			Non-album singles
"—" denotes a release that did not chart or were not released on that territory.

== Other charted songs ==
Title	Year	Peak chart positions				Certifications	Album
Title	Year	US Bubbling	US Country Songs	US Country Digital	NZ Hot	Certifications	Album
"Ex to See"	2014	—	37	38	—	RIAA: Platinum; MC: Platinum	Montevallo
"Speakers"	2014	—	40	22	—	RIAA: Platinum; MC: Gold	Montevallo
"Single for the Summer"	2014	—	—	45	—	RIAA: Gold; MC: Gold	Montevallo
"Cop Car"	2014	—	—	48	—	RIAA: Gold; MC: Gold	Montevallo
"Come Over"	2015	—	42	34	—	RIAA: Gold; MC: Gold	Between the Pines
"2016"	2020	18	25	11	34	MC: Gold	Southside
"Young Once"	2020	—	34	23	—		Southside
"That Ain't Beautiful"	2020	—	50	—	—		Southside
"—" denotes a release that did not chart.

== Music videos ==
Title	Year	Director(s)
"Raised on It"	2013	Brad Belanger
"Leave the Night On"	2014	Brad Belanger and Sam Hunt
"House Party" (alternate video)	2014	Brad Belanger and Steven Worster
"Take Your Time"	2015	Tim Mattia
"House Party" (official music video)	2015	Justin Key and Steven Worster
"Break Up in a Small Town"	2015	Tim Mattia
"Single for the Summer"	2016	Steven Alan
"Downtown's Dead"	2018	Jim Wright
"Hard to Forget"	2020	Tim Mattia
"Young Once"	2020	Tim Mattia
"Breaking Up Was Easy in the 90s"	2020	Justin Clough

== Writing credits ==
Title	Year	Artist	Album
"Real Good Feel Good"	2012	Neal McCoy	XII
"Come Over"	2012	Kenny Chesney	Welcome to the Fishbowl
"We Are Tonight"	2013	Billy Currington	We Are Tonight
"Cop Car"	2013	Keith Urban	Fuse
"Catch Me If You Can"	2013	Dylan Scott	Makin' This Boy Go Crazy
"How Do I Get There from Her"	2014	Marshall Dane	One of These Days
"Love Somebody"	2015	Reba McEntire	Love Somebody
"I Met a Girl"	2015	William Michael Morgan	Vinyl
"Halabamalujah"	2017	Lucas Hoge	Dirty Sputh
"Grits & Glamour"	2021	Nelly and Kane Brown	Heartland
"Slide"	2022	Madeline Merlo	Slide
