= List of awards and nominations received by Sam Hunt =

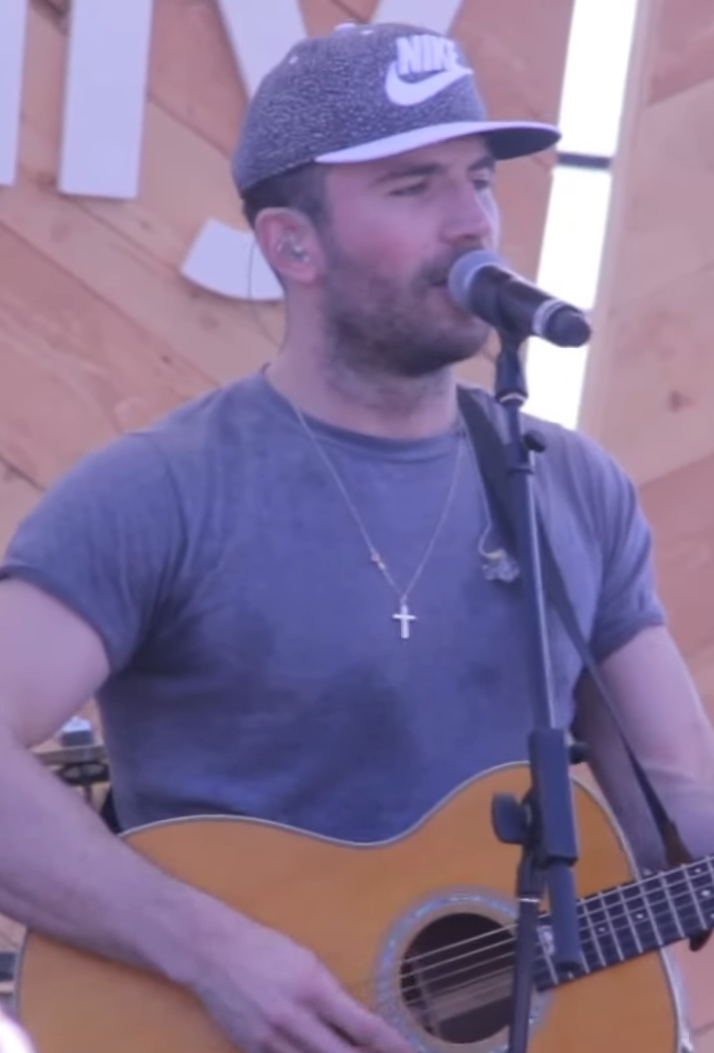
Sam Hunt performing at South by Southwest in 2015.

American country singer and songwriter Sam Hunt has received numerous awards since 2015.

== Awards and nominations ==
=== Academy of Country Music Awards ===
Year	Nominee / work	Award	Result
2015	Himself	New Artist of the Year	Nominated
2016	Montevallo	Album of the Year	Nominated
2016	"Take Your Time"	Single Record of the Year	Nominated
2018	"Body Like a Back Road"	Song of the Year	Nominated
2018	"Body Like a Back Road"	Single Record of the Year	Won
2018	Himself	Gene Weed Milestone Award	Won

=== American Country Countdown Awards ===
Year	Nominee / work	Award	Result
2016	Himself	Artist of the Year	Nominated
2016	Himself	Male Vocalist of the Year	Nominated
2016	Himself	Breakthrough Male of the Year	Won
2016	Montevallo	Album of the Year	Nominated
2016	Montevallo	Digital Album of the Year	Won

=== American Music Awards ===
Year	Nominee / work	Award	Result
2015	Himself	New Artist of the Year	Won
2015	Himself	Favorite Male Artist – Country	Nominated
2015	Montevallo	Favorite Album – Country	Nominated
2017	Himself	Favorite Male Artist – Country	Nominated
2017	"Body Like a Back Road"	Favorite Song – Country	Nominated

=== ASCAP Country Music Awards ===
Year	Nominee / work	Award	Result
2015	Himself	Songwriter-Artist of the Year	Won

=== Billboard Music Awards ===
Year	Nominee / work	Award	Result
2015	"Leave the Night On"	Top Country Song	Nominated
2016	Himself	Top Country Artist	Nominated
2016	Montevallo	Top Country Album	Nominated
2016	"Break Up in a Small Town"	Top Country Song	Nominated
2016	"Take Your Time"	Top Country Song	Nominated

=== Country Music Association Awards ===
Year	Nominee / work	Award	Result
2015	"Take Your Time"	Single of the Year	Nominated
2015	"Take Your Time"	Song of the Year	Nominated
2015	Himself	New Artist of the Year	Nominated
2017	"Body Like a Back Road"	Single of the Year	Nominated
2017	"Body Like a Back Road"	Song of the Year	Nominated
2018	"Body Like a Back Road"	Song of the Year	Nominated

=== CMT Music Awards ===
Year	Nominee / work	Award	Result
2015	"Leave the Night On"	Breakthrough Video of the Year	Won
2015	"Leave the Night On"	Video of the Year	Nominated

=== Grammy Awards ===
Year	Nominee / work	Award	Result
2016	Himself	Best New Artist	Nominated
2016	Montevallo	Best Country Album	Nominated
2018	"Body Like a Back Road"	Best Country Solo Performance	Nominated
2018	"Body Like a Back Road"	Best Country Song	Nominated
2023	"Wishful Drinking" (with Ingrid Andress)	Best Country Duo/Group Performance	Nominated

=== People's Choice Awards ===
Year	Nominee / work	Award	Result
2017	Himself	Favorite Male Country Artist	Nominated

=== Teen Choice Awards ===
Year	Nominee / work	Award	Result
2015	"Take Your Time"	Choice Country Song	Nominated
2016	Himself	Choice Country Artist	Nominated
2016	"Make You Miss Me"	Choice Country Song	Nominated
2017	Himself	Choice Country Artist	Nominated
2017	"Body Like a Back Road"	Choice Song: Male Artist	Nominated
2017	"Body Like a Back Road"	Choice Country Song	Won
2017	15 in a 30 Tour	Choice Summer Tour	Nominated
