= Country House (Sam Hunt song) =

Single by Sam Hunt

from the EP Locked Up
- Released: May 28, 2024
- Genre: Country
- Length: 3:34
- Label: MCA Nashville
- Songwriters: Ross Copperman; Sam Hunt; Michael Lotten; Josh Osborne
- Producer: Michael Lotten

Sam Hunt singles chronology
| "Outskirts" (2023) | "Country House" (2024) |

Music video
- "Country House" on YouTube

"Country House" is a song by American country music singer Sam Hunt. It was released on May 28, 2024, as the second single from his EP, Locked Up (2024).

== Content ==
Hunt co-wrote "Country House" with Ross Copperman, Josh Osborne, and Michael Lotten, with the latter also producing the track. Lyrically, the song describes the country lifestyle through the lens of a "nostalgic, romance-driven heart". Sonically, it melds a "moderate stripped-back production" with "808s and synth beats", a customary style of Hunt's music.

== Critical reception ==
Kevin John Coyne of Country Universe gave the song a "B" grade, criticizing the production as "listless" while praising its songwriting for being a "lyrically fantastic celebration of the country life." Coyne also compared the song's theme favorably to those of Dolly Parton's "My Tennessee Mountain Home" and Tim McGraw's "Where the Green Grass Grows"

== Music video ==
The music video for "Country House" premiered on September 12, 2024. Hunt's wife, Hannah Lee Fowler, and their two young children co-star alongside him in the video. Hunt's brothers, Ben and Van, and their families also appear in the video.

== Charts ==
=== Weekly charts ===
Weekly chart performance for "Country House"
| Chart (2024–2025) | Peak position |
|---|---|
| Canada Country (Billboard) | 9 |
| US Billboard Hot 100 | 98 |
| US Country Airplay (Billboard) | 2 |
| US Hot Country Songs (Billboard) | 27 |

=== Year-end charts ===
Year-end chart performance for "Country House"
| Chart (2025) | Position |
|---|---|
| Canada Country (Billboard) | 37 |
| US Country Airplay (Billboard) | 18 |
