= Water Under the Bridge (disambiguation) =

"Water Under the Bridge" is a 2016 single by Adele.

Water Under the Bridge may also refer to:

== Music ==
- Water Under the Bridge (album), a 1988 album by Deniece Williams
- Water Under the Bridge (Sam Hunt song), 2022
- Water Under the Bridge, a 1999 album by Sev Lewkowicz
- "Water Under the Bridge", a song by Dan Seals from the album On Arrival, 1990
- "Water Under the Bridge", a song written by Stephen Sondheim for the 1992 musical Singing Out Loud
- "Water Under the Bridge", a song by Dodgy from the Dodgy Album, 1993
- "Water Under the Bridge", a song by Guy Clark from the album Cold Dog Soup, 1999
- "Water Under the Bridge", a song by Jars of Clay from the album Good Monsters, 2006

== Other uses ==
- Water Under the Bridge (miniseries), 1980 Australian miniseries
- Water Under the Bridge, a 1977 novel by Sumner Locke Elliott
- "Water under the bridge", an English-language idiom referring to something in the past that is forgiven because it can not be changed
