= Zach Crowell =

American songwriter

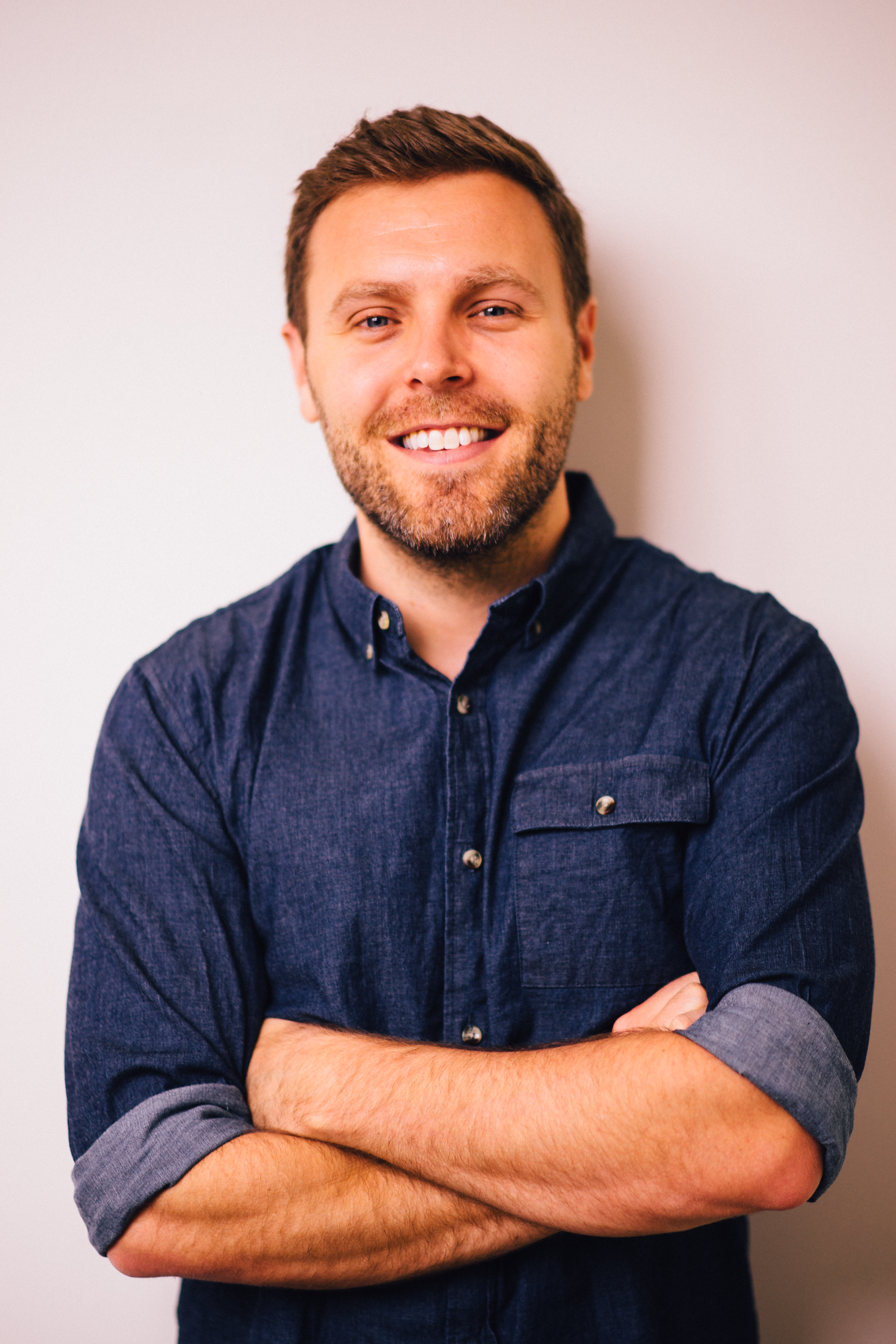
- Zach Crowell

Background information
- Born: Nashville, Tennessee
- Genres: Country; pop; hip-hop
- Occupations: Songwriter; record producer

Zach Crowell is a songwriter and record producer who was born in Nashville and grew up there. He has a joint administrative agreement with Sony Music Publishing. He has written and or produced over 30 No. 1 songs and is a three-time Grammy Award nominee.

Jelly Roll, Sam Hunt, Carrie Underwood, Dustin Lynch, Keith Urban, Luke Bryan, Dierks Bentley, Florida Georgia Line, and Cole Swindell are among the artists for which Crowell has worked. He produced and co-wrote the 2017 song "Body Like a Back Road" for Hunt. At the time, the song set the all-time record at 34 weeks for the most time spent on top of the Billboard Hot Country Songs chart.

== Selected discography ==
Year	Artist	Album	Song	Writer / Producer
2025	Cole Swindell	Spanish Moss	"Lost Heart"	Writer; producer
2025	Cole Swindell	Spanish Moss	"First Second"	Writer; producer
2025	Cole Swindell	Spanish Moss	"Heads Up Heaven"	Writer; producer
2025	Cole Swindell	Spanish Moss	"It Don't Hurt Anymore"	Writer; producer
2025	Blake Shelton	For Recreational Use Only	"Strangers"	Writer
2025	Dustin Lynch	TBA	"Easy To Love"	Writer; producer
2024	Jelly Roll	Beautifully Broken		
2024	Jelly Roll	Beautifully Broken	"Winning Streak"	Producer
2024	Jelly Roll	Beautifully Broken	"Burning"	Writer; producer
2024	Jelly Roll	Beautifully Broken	"Heart of Stone"	Writer; producer
2024	Jelly Roll	Beautifully Broken	"I Am Not Okay"	Producer
2024	Jelly Roll	Beautifully Broken	"When the Drugs Don't Work" (with Ilsey)	Producer
2024	Jelly Roll	Beautifully Broken	"Higher Than Heaven" (with Wiz Khalifa)	Producer
2024	Jelly Roll	Beautifully Broken	"Liar"	Producer
2024	Jelly Roll	Beautifully Broken	"Grace"	Producer
2024	Jelly Roll	Beautifully Broken	"What It Takes"	Writer; producer
2024	Jelly Roll	Beautifully Broken	"Hey Mama"	Producer
2024	Jelly Roll	Beautifully Broken	"Time of Day" (with Machine Gun Kelly)	Writer; producer
2024	Jelly Roll	Beautifully Broken	"Take a Bow" (with Halsey)	Writer; producer
2024	Jelly Roll	Beautifully Broken	"Past Yesterday" (with Skylar Grey)	Producer
2024	Sam Hunt	Locked Up	"Locked Up"	Writer; producer
2024	Sam Hunt	Locked Up	"Liberty"	Writer; producer
2024	Sam Hunt	Locked Up	"Last Hurrah"	Producer
2024	Madeline Merlo	One House Down (from the girl next door)	"Broken Heart Thing"	Writer; producer
2024	Madeline Merlo	One House Down (from the girl next door)	"Bar Fight"	Producer
2024	Madeline Merlo	One House Down (from the girl next door)	"Middle of the Bed"	Producer
2024	Madeline Merlo	One House Down (from the girl next door)	"Good Grief"	Producer
2024	Madeline Merlo	One House Down (from the girl next door)	"One House Down (from the girl next door)"	Producer
2023	Dan + Shay	Bigger Houses	"Breakin' Up with a Broken Heart"	Writer
2023	Dan + Shay	Bigger Houses	"Neon Cowgirl"	Writer
2023	Old Dominion	Memory Lane	"Different About You"	Writer
2023	Dustin Lynch	Killed the Cowboy	"Killed the Cowboy"	Producer
2023	Dustin Lynch	Killed the Cowboy	"Honky Tonk Heartbreaker"	Writer; producer
2023	Dustin Lynch	Killed the Cowboy	"George Strait Jr."	Producer
2023	Dustin Lynch	Killed the Cowboy	"Chevrolet" (featuring Jelly Roll)	Producer
2023	Dustin Lynch	Killed the Cowboy	"If I Stop Drinkin'"	Producer
2023	Dustin Lynch	Killed the Cowboy	"Only Girl In This Town"	Producer
2023	Dustin Lynch	Killed the Cowboy	"Breakin' Up Down"	Writer; producer
2023	Dustin Lynch	Killed the Cowboy	"Trouble with This Truck"	Writer; producer
2023	Dustin Lynch	Killed the Cowboy	"Blue Lights"	Producer
2023	Dustin Lynch	Killed the Cowboy	"Lonestar"	Producer
2023	Dustin Lynch	Killed the Cowboy	"Listen to the Radio"	Producer
2023	Dustin Lynch	Killed the Cowboy	"Long Way Home"	Producer
2023	Jelly Roll	Whitsitt Chapel	"Halfway to Hell"	Producer
2023	Jelly Roll	Whitsitt Chapel	"Church"	Producer
2023	Jelly Roll	Whitsitt Chapel	"The Lost"	Producer
2023	Jelly Roll	Whitsitt Chapel	"Nail Me"	Producer
2023	Jelly Roll	Whitsitt Chapel	"Hold on Me"	Producer
2023	Jelly Roll	Whitsitt Chapel	"Kill a Man"	Producer
2023	Jelly Roll	Whitsitt Chapel	"Unlive" (featuring Yelawolf)	Writer; producer
2023	Jelly Roll	Whitsitt Chapel	"Save Me" (featuring Lainey Wilson)	Producer
2023	Jelly Roll	Whitsitt Chapel	"Dancing with the Devil"	Writer; producer
2023	Jelly Roll	Whitsitt Chapel	"Hungover In a Church Pew"	Writer; producer
2023	Madeline Merlo	One House Down (From the Girl Next Door)	"Same Car"	Writer; producer
2023	Madeline Merlo	—N/a	"Tim + Faith"	Writer; producer
2023	Cole Swindell	Stereotype	"Broken"	Producer
2023	Cole Swindell	Stereotype	"Drinkaby"	Producer
2023	Sam Hunt	TBA	"Start Nowhere"	Writer; producer
2023	Sam Hunt	TBA	"Outskirts"	Writer; producer
2023	Sam Hunt	TBA	"Walmart"	Writer; producer
2023	Sam Hunt	TBA	"Women In My Life"	Writer; producer
2022	Russell Dickerson	Russell Dickerson	"God Gave Me a Girl"	Writer; producer
2022	Russell Dickerson	Russell Dickerson	"All the Same Friends"	Writer; producer
2022	Russell Dickerson	Russell Dickerson	"I Still Believe"	Writer
2022	Russell Dickerson	Russell Dickerson	"Drink to This"	Writer
2022	Russell Dickerson	Russell Dickerson	"Beers to the Summer"	Producer
2022	Madeline Merlo	Slide	"Slide"	Writer; producer
2022	Madeline Merlo	Slide	"YOUNG-ish"	Writer; producer
2022	Madeline Merlo	Slide	"Girl Where He Grew Up"	Producer
2022	Madeline Merlo	Slide	"I Need a Drink"	Writer; producer
2022	Cole Swindell	Stereotype	"She Had Me at Heads Carolina"	Producer
2022	Cole Swindell	Stereotype	"Never Say Never" (featuring Lainey Wilson)	Producer
2022	Cole Swindell	Stereotype	"I'm Gonna Let Her"	Producer
2022	Cole Swindell	Stereotype	"How Is She"	Producer
2022	Cole Swindell	Stereotype	"Girl Goes Crazy"	Producer
2022	Cole Swindell	Stereotype	"Miss Wherever"	Producer
2022	Cole Swindell	Stereotype	"Some Habits"	Producer
2022	Cole Swindell	Stereotype	"Walk on Whiskey"	Producer
2022	Cole Swindell	Stereotype	"Sayin' You Love Me"	Producer
2022	Thomas Rhett	Where We Started	"Death Row"	Writer
2022	Dustin Lynch	Blue in the Sky	"Party Mode"	Producer
2022	Dustin Lynch	Blue in the Sky	"Thinking 'Bout You" (featuring MacKenzie Porter)	Producer
2022	Dustin Lynch	Blue in the Sky	"Stars Like Confetti"	Writer; producer
2022	Dustin Lynch	Blue in the Sky	"Somethin' That Makes You Smile"	Producer
2022	Dustin Lynch	Blue in the Sky	"Break It on a Beach"	Writer; producer
2022	Dustin Lynch	Blue in the Sky	"Tequila on a Boat" (featuring Chris Lane)	Producer
2022	Dustin Lynch	Blue in the Sky	"Tennessee Trouble"	Producer
2022	Dustin Lynch	Blue in the Sky	"Summer Never Ended"	Producer
2022	Dustin Lynch	Blue in the Sky	"Back Road TN"	Producer
2022	Dustin Lynch	Blue in the Sky	"Huntin' Land" (featuring Riley Green)	Producer
2022	Dustin Lynch	Blue in the Sky	"Pasenda"	Producer
2022	Dustin Lynch	Blue in the Sky	"Not Every Cowboy"	Producer
2022	Chris Janson	All In	"Bye Mom"	Producer
2022	Chris Janson	All In	"All In"	Writer; producer
2022	Chris Janson	All In	"Keys to the Country"	Writer; producer
2021	Luke Bryan	Born Here Live Here Die Here	"Waves"	Writer
2021	Thomas Rhett	Country Again: Side A	"Country Again"	Writer
2021	Thomas Rhett	Country Again: Side A	"Blame It on a Backroad"	Writer
2021	Ryan Hurd	Pelago	"June, July, August"	Writer
2021	Scotty McCreery	Same Truck	"Same Truck"	Writer
2021	Scotty McCreery	Same Truck	"Small Town Girl"	Writer
2021	Brett Young	Weekends Look a Little Different These Days	"Weekends Look a Little Different These Days"	Writer
2020	Kenny Chesney	Here and Now	"Heartbreakers"	Writer
2020	Sam Hunt	Southside	"2016"	Writer; producer
2020	Sam Hunt	Southside	"Hard to Forget"	Producer
2020	Sam Hunt	Southside	"Kinfolks"	Writer; producer
2020	Sam Hunt	Southside	"Sinning with You"	Producer
2020	Sam Hunt	Southside	"Young Once"	Writer; producer
2020	Sam Hunt	Southside	"Let It Down"	Writer; producer
2020	Sam Hunt	Southside	"That Ain't Beautiful"	Writer; producer
2020	Sam Hunt	Southside	"Breaking Up Was Easy in the 90s"	Writer; producer
2020	Sam Hunt	Southside	"Nothing Lasts Forever"	Writer; producer
2020	Dustin Lynch	Tullahoma	"Momma's House"	Producer
2020	Dustin Lynch	Tullahoma	"Dirt Road"	Producer
2020	Dustin Lynch	Tullahoma	"Thinking 'Bout You"	Producer
2020	Dustin Lynch	Tullahoma	"Ridin' Roads"	Writer; producer
2020	Dustin Lynch	Tullahoma	"Old Country Song"	Producer
2020	Dustin Lynch	Tullahoma	"The World Ain't Yours and Mine"	Producer
2020	Dustin Lynch	Tullahoma	"Country Star"	Producer
2020	Dustin Lynch	Tullahoma	"Workin' on You"	Producer
2020	Dustin Lynch	Tullahoma	"Country Star"	Producer
2020	Dustin Lynch	Tullahoma	"Little Town Livin"	Writer; producer
2020	Dustin Lynch	Tullahoma	"Red Dirt, Blue Eyes"	Producer
2019	Thomas Rhett	Center Point Road	"Don't Stop Drivin'"	Writer
2019	Chris Janson	Real Friends	"Good Vibes"	Writer; Producer
2019	Chris Janson	Real Friends	"Normal People"	Writer; Producer
2018	Brett Young	Ticket to L.A.	"Ticket to L.A."	Writer
2018	Brett Young	Ticket to L.A.	"Runnin' Away from Home"	Writer
2018	Brett Young	Ticket to L.A.	"Don't Wanna Write This Song"	Writer
2018	Sam Hunt	Southside	"Downtown's Dead"	Writer; producer
2018	Dustin Lynch	Tullahoma	"Good Girl"	Producer
2017	Sam Hunt	Bright: The Album	"This Land Is Your Land"	Producer
2017	Luke Bryan	What Makes You Country	"Sunrise, Sunburn, Sunset"	Writer
2017	Kelsea Ballerini	Unapologetically	"Roses"	Writer
2017	Darius Rucker	When Was the Last Time	"Twenty Something"	Writer
2017	Dustin Lynch	Current Mood	"Small Town Boy"	Producer
2017	Dustin Lynch	Current Mood	"New Girl"	Writer; producer
2017	Dustin Lynch	Current Mood	"Here We Come"	Writer; producer
2017	Brett Young	Brett Young	"Making Me Say"	Writer
2017	Sam Hunt	Southside	"Body Like a Back Road"	Writer; producer
2017	Sam Hunt	Southside	"Drinkin' Too Much"	Writer; producer
2016	Florida Georgia Line	Dig Your Roots	"Good Girl, Bad Boy"	Writer
2016	Blake Shelton	If I'm Honest	"You Can't Make This Up"	Writer
2016	Cole Swindell	You Should Be Here	"Middle of a Memory"	Writer
2016	Martina McBride	Reckless	"Reckless"	Writer
2016	Joe	My Name Is Joe Thomas	"Hollow"	Writer; producer
2015	Sam Hunt	Between the Pines	Between the Pines	Writer; producer
2015	Carrie Underwood	Storyteller	"Heartbeat"	Writer; producer
2015	Carrie Underwood	Storyteller	"Church Bells"	Writer
2015	Carrie Underwood	Storyteller	"Dirty Laundry"	Writer
2015	Carrie Underwood	Storyteller	"Relapse"	Producer
2015	Michael Ray	Michael Ray	"Everything in Between"	Writer
2015	Easton Corbin	About to Get Real	"Guys and Girls"	Writer
2015	Billy Currington	Summer Forever	"Do I Make You Wanna"	Writer
2015	Brett Kissel	Pick Me Up	"Airwaves"	Writer
2015	Luke Bryan	Spring Break...Checkin' Out	"Spring Breakdown"	Writer
2014	Cole Swindell	Down Home Sessions	"Kiss"	Writer
2014	Sam Hunt	Montevallo	"Take Your Time"	Producer
2014	Sam Hunt	Montevallo	"Leave the Night On"	Producer
2014	Sam Hunt	Montevallo	"House Party"	Writer; producer
2014	Sam Hunt	Montevallo	"Break Up in a Small Town"	Writer; producer
2014	Sam Hunt	Montevallo	"Single for the Summer"	Writer; producer
2014	Sam Hunt	Montevallo	"Ex to See"	Producer
2014	Sam Hunt	Montevallo	"Make You Miss Me"	Producer
2014	Sam Hunt	Montevallo	"Cop Car"	Writer; producer
2014	Sam Hunt	Montevallo	"Raised on It"	Writer; producer
2014	Sam Hunt	Montevallo	"Speakers"	Producer
2014	Chase Rice	Ignite the Night	"What's Your Name"	Writer
2014	Chase Rice	Ignite the Night	"U Turn"	Writer
2014	Dustin Lynch	Where It's At	"Where It's At"	Writer
2014	Dustin Lynch	Where It's At	"Hell of a Night"	Writer
2014	Dustin Lynch	Where It's At	"To the Sky"	Writer
2014	Dustin Lynch	Where It's At	"Middle of Nowhere"	Writer
2014	Lindsay Ell	Single	"Shut Me Up"	Writer
2014	Colt Ford	Thanks for Listening	"The High Life" (featuring Chase Rice)	Writer
2013	Keith Urban	Fuse	"Cop Car"	Writer; producer
2013	Dierks Bentley	Riser	"Sounds of Summer"	Writer
2013	Jake Owen	Days of Gold	"Good Timing"	Writer
2013	Scotty McCreery	See You Tonight	"See You Tonight"	Writer
2013	Scotty McCreery	See You Tonight	"Can You Feel It"	Writer
2013	Will Hoge	Never Give In	"Strong"	Writer; producer
2012	Lecrae	Gravity	"Confe$$ions"	Writer; producer
