= Between the Pines =

Mixtape by Sam Hunt
- Released: October 1, 2013 (original release); October 27, 2015 (re-release)
- Genre: Country
- Length: 46:19
- Labels: Out in It (original release); MCA Nashville (re-release)
- Producer: Zach Crowell

Sam Hunt chronology
Between the Pines (2013)	X2C (2014)

Professional ratings
Review scores
Source	Rating
AllMusic	3/5 stars

Between the Pines is an acoustic mixtape by American country music singer Sam Hunt. Hunt released the mixtape for free in October 2013, by his website. Some of the songs later appeared on his debut studio album Montevallo, while some were recorded by other artists. The mixtape was re-released on October 27, 2015, by MCA Nashville to commemorate the one-year anniversary of Hunt's debut studio album Montevallo. The album has sold 34,000 copies in the US as of January 2016.

== Critical reception ==
Stephen Thomas Erlewine of AllMusic gave the album three stars out of five, writing that "what's most interesting about this 'acoustic mixtape' is how, even without the shiny veneer of Shane McAnally's studio production, Hunt's lithe soul and hip-hop influences are evident, both in the drum loops and his fleet cadences".

== Track listing ==
No.	Title	Writer(s)	Length
1.	"Raised on It"	Zach Crowell; Jerry Flowers; Sam Hunt	3:24
2.	"Cop Car"	Crowell; Hunt; Matt Jenkins	3:26
3.	"Ex to See"	Hunt; Josh Osborne; Matthew Ramsey	2:48
4.	"House Party"	Crowell; Flowers; Hunt	3:07
5.	"Leave the Night On"	Hunt; Shane McAnally; Osborne	2:44
6.	"We Are Tonight"	Marc Beeson; Hunt; Osborne	2:52
7.	"Make You Miss Me"	Hunt; Osborne; Ramsey	3:40
8.	"I Met a Girl"	Hunt; McAnally; Trevor Rosen	2:53
9.	"Bottle It Up"	Hunt; Jenkins; Rosen	2:40
10.	"Saturday Night"	Beeson; Hunt; Osborne	3:11
11.	"Speakers"	Brandon Hood; Hunt; Kylie Sackley	3:03
12.	"Vacation"	J. T. Harding; Hunt; Luke Laird	2:43
13.	"Vandalizer"	Jaron Boyer; Crowell; Hunt	2:37
14.	"Goodbye"	Nicholas Hayes; Hunt; Brian Warren	3:10
15.	"Come Over"	Hunt; McAnally; Osborne	4:01

== Chart performance ==
Chart (2015)	Peak position
Canadian Albums (Billboard)	80
US Billboard 200	31
US Top Country Albums (Billboard)	7
