= Outskirts (song) =

Single by Sam Hunt

from the EP Locked Up
- Released: July 17, 2023
- Genre: Country
- Length: 3:03
- Label: MCA Nashville
- Songwriters: Sam Hunt; Josh Osborne; Jerry Flowers; Zach Crowell
- Producers: Sam Hunt; Zach Crowell; Chris LaCorte

Sam Hunt singles chronology
"Water Under the Bridge" (2022)	"Outskirts" (2023)	"Country House" (2024)

Music video
- "Outskirts" on YouTube

"Outskirts" is a song by American country music singer Sam Hunt. It was released on July 17, 2023, as the lead single from his EP Locked Up. He wrote the song with Zach Crowell, Josh Osborne, and Jerry Flowers.

== History ==
In an interview with Today's Country Radio, Hunt stated that the idea for the song came when he was thinking about his relationship with his wife, Hannah Lee Fowler. The two had filed for divorce but decided to reconcile instead of following through on the divorce. Taste of Country states that the song's lyrics "tell the story of a single guy who tries hard to keep busy in the city, in hopes of keeping his mind off the relationship he lost. But whenever he's on the outskirts of town, he can't help but reminisce about the woman he loved, and where they might be today if the relationship hadn't ended".

== Charts ==
=== Weekly charts ===
Weekly chart performance
Chart (2023–2024)	Peak position
Canada Hot 100 (Billboard)	96
Canada Country (Billboard)	1
UK Country Airplay (Radiomonitor)	1
US Billboard Hot 100	66
US Country Airplay (Billboard)	1
US Hot Country Songs (Billboard)	14

=== Year-end charts ===
Annual chart rankings
Chart (2024)	Position
US Country Airplay (Billboard)	9
US Hot Country Songs (Billboard)	80
US Radio Songs (Billboard)	25

== Certifications ==
Certifications for "Outskirts"
Region	Certification	Certified units/sales
Canada (Music Canada)	Gold	40,000^{‡}
United States (RIAA)	Platinum	1,000,000^{‡}
^{‡} Sales+streaming figures based on certification alone.
