= 23 (Sam Hunt song) =

2021 single by Sam Hunt

Single by Sam Hunt
- Released: September 9, 2021
- Genre: Country
- Length: 2:59
- Label: MCA Nashville
- Songwriters: Sam Hunt; Shane McAnally; Chris LaCorte; Josh Osborne
- Producer: Chris LaCorte

Sam Hunt singles chronology
"When Was It Over?" (2021)	"23" (2021)	"Wishful Drinking" (2021)

Music video
- "23" on YouTube

"23" is a song by American country music singer Sam Hunt. It was released on September 9, 2021. Hunt wrote the song with Shane McAnally, Chris LaCorte, and Josh Osborne, while LaCorte produced it.

== Background ==
In July 2020, Hunt shared an acoustic performance video of the track on Instagram, which was later aired as part of the 2020 Highway Finds Fest the same month. Lauren Jo Black of Country Now called the song "nostalgic" about a prior relationship Hunt was in, in which he "fondly reminisc[es] on all of the memories he shared with an ex lover. And although they've moved on from each other, he admits he still cherishes the times they shared together".

== Composition ==
Tom Roland of Billboard noted that the song uses "only two chords" in contrast to country music's three-chord norm, alternating "between a pair of major seventh chords, a four-note construct with one extra note that's only a half step below the root".

== Cover art ==
The photograph used is an early photo of Hunt's wife's aunt and uncle when they were a young couple.

== Music video ==
The music video was released on October 1, 2021, and directed by Tim Mattia. According to Chris Parton of Sounds Like Nashville, the video features three characters: "a single mom who dreams of carefree freedom, an old man who longs for a fast horse and the open range, or a woman still holding on to that 23-year-old summer". The video shows them each using a virtual reality headset to "relive their most treasured memories".

== Charts ==
=== Weekly charts ===
Weekly chart performance for "23"
Chart (2021–2022)	Peak position
Australia Country Hot 50 (TMN)	13
Canada (Canadian Hot 100)	57
Canada Country (Billboard)	1
US Billboard Hot 100	50
US Country Airplay (Billboard)	1
US Hot Country Songs (Billboard)	10

=== Year-end charts ===
Year-end chart performance for "23"
Chart (2022)	Position
US Country Airplay (Billboard)	7
US Hot Country Songs (Billboard)	46
US Radio Songs (Billboard)	57

== Certifications ==
Certifications for "23"
Region	Certification	Certified units/sales
Canada (Music Canada)	Platinum	80,000^{‡}
United States (RIAA)	Platinum	1,000,000^{‡}
^{‡} Sales+streaming figures based on certification alone.
