= Kinfolks =

Single by Sam Hunt

from the album Southside
- Released: October 11, 2019
- Genre: Country
- Length: 3:01
- Label: MCA Nashville
- Songwriters: Sam Hunt; Zach Crowell; Jerry Flowers; Josh Osborne
- Producer: Zach Crowell

Sam Hunt singles chronology
"Downtown's Dead" (2018)	"Kinfolks" (2019)	"Hard to Forget" (2020)

Audio video
- "Kinfolks" on YouTube

"Kinfolks" is a song recorded by American country music singer Sam Hunt, released as a single on October 11, 2019. It is the third single from Hunt's second studio album Southside. It is Hunt's ninth single release, and he co-wrote it with Zach Crowell, Jerry Flowers, and Josh Osborne. It debuted at number 64 on the US Billboard Hot 100 and ultimately peaked at number 34.

== Critical reception ==
The track was described by Sterling Whitaker of Taste of Country as a "traditional-themed love song about wanting a lover to meet the family and see the places and faces most important to you" as well as a "progressive musical track features the kind of spoken-work, not-quite-rapping verses Hunt is best known for". Writing for Rolling Stone, Jon Freeman described the song as featuring "acoustic guitar arpeggios that lead into big, bright choruses of banjo, vocal snippets, and wah-wah guitar", also calling it "not too far afield from the all-embracing sound that made his debut Montevallo such a compelling listen".

== Commercial performance ==
"Kinfolks" debuted at number 18 on the Billboard Country Airplay chart based on three and a half day of availability after its release to radio, which equals the debut of his previous single, "Downtown's Dead". It was the second best-selling country song the following week, with 13,000 copies sold, in addition to the 2,000 copies sold when it was released for sale late the previous week. It reached No. 1 on Billboard's Country Airplay on chart dated February 29, 2020. It is also the first country song to top the Country Airplay chart on Leap Day since Garth Brooks' "What She's Doing Now" stayed for the third week in 1992, as well as Hunt's first number one since "Body Like a Back Road" in 2017. It has sold 72,000 copies in the United States as of March 2020.

== Charts ==
=== Weekly charts ===
Chart (2019–2020)	Peak position
Australia Country Hot 50 (TMN)	2
Canada Hot 100 (Billboard)	70
Canada Country (Billboard)	2
US Billboard Hot 100	34
US Country Airplay (Billboard)	1
US Hot Country Songs (Billboard)	3
US Rolling Stone Top 100	54

=== Year-end charts ===
Chart (2019)	Position
US Hot Country Songs (Billboard)	96

Chart (2020)	Position
US Country Airplay (Billboard)	3
US Hot Country Songs (Billboard)	13

== Certifications ==
Region	Certification	Certified units/sales
Canada (Music Canada)	2× Platinum	160,000^{‡}
United States (RIAA)	2× Platinum	2,000,000^{‡}
^{‡} Sales+streaming figures based on certification alone.
