= Water Under the Bridge (Sam Hunt song) =

Single by Sam Hunt
- Released: June 23, 2022
- Genre: Country
- Length: 2:50
- Label: MCA Nashville
- Songwriters: Sam Hunt; Shane McAnally; Josh Osborne; Chris LaCorte
- Producers: Chris LaCorte; Sam Hunt; Shane McAnally

Sam Hunt singles chronology
| "Wishful Drinking" (2021) | "Water Under the Bridge" (2022) | "Outskirts" (2023) |

Music video
- "Water Under the Bridge" on YouTube

"Water Under the Bridge" is a song by American country music singer Sam Hunt. It was released June 23, 2022. Hunt wrote the song with Shane McAnally, Josh Osborne and Chris LaCorte and produced it with McAnally and LaCorte.

== Content ==
The song has a theme of nostalgia, which is compared to the metaphor of "water under the bridge". Lesley Janes of Nash News described the song as "laid back". After the song's release, Hunt released a music video featuring singer Kassi Ashton.

== Commercial performance ==
Peaking at number 10 on the US Bubbling Under Hot 100 chart, it became the first single of Hunt's career that failed to chart on the US Billboard Hot 100. It also became only the second single of Hunt's career not to chart within the top 10 on the Country Airplay chart (the first being "Downtown's Dead").

== Personnel ==
According to AllMusic.

Musicians

- Tim Brasteid – percussion, background vocals
- Tyrone Carreker – percussion, background vocals
- Sam Hunt – vocals, acoustic guitar
- Chris LaCorte – electric guitar, background vocals, percussion, programming, synthesizer
- Josh Osborne – background vocals
- Sol Philcox-Littlefield – electric guitar
- Joshua Sales – percussion, background vocals
- Ilya Toshinsky – banjo, acoustic guitar, Dobro
- Alex Wright – Hammond organ, piano, synthesizer
- Craig Young – bass guitar
- Nir Z – drums, percussion

Technical

- Ryan Gore – mixing, recording
- Sam Hunt – producer
- Chris LaCorte – producer
- Kam Lutcherland – assistant engineer
- Alyson McAnally – production coordination
- Shane McAnally – producer
- Zaq Reynolds – mixing assistant

== Charts ==
=== Weekly charts ===
Weekly chart performance for "Water Under the Bridge"
| Chart (2022–2023) | Peak position |
|---|---|
| Canada Country (Billboard) | 33 |
| US Bubbling Under Hot 100 (Billboard) | 10 |
| US Country Airplay (Billboard) | 15 |
| US Hot Country Songs (Billboard) | 27 |

=== Year-end charts ===
Year-end chart performance for "Water Under the Bridge"
| Chart (2023) | Position |
|---|---|
| US Country Airplay (Billboard) | 50 |
| US Hot Country Songs (Billboard) | 79 |

== Certifications ==
Certifications for "Water Under the Bridge"
| Region | Certification | Certified units/sales |
|---|---|---|
| Canada (Music Canada) | Gold | 40,000^{‡} |
| United States (RIAA) | Gold | 500,000^{‡} |
^{‡} Sales+streaming figures based on certification alone.
