= Sinning with You =

2020 song by Sam Hunt

Promotional single by Sam Hunt

from the album Southside
- Released: January 3, 2020
- Length: 3:16
- Label: MCA Nashville
- Songwriters: Sam Hunt; Josh Osborne; Paul DiGiovanni; Emily Weisband
- Producers: Zach Crowell; Bryce Cain

Audio video
- "Sinning with You" on YouTube

"Sinning with You" is a song recorded by American country singer Sam Hunt. He co-wrote the track with Josh Osborne, Paul DiGiovanni, and Emily Weisband. It was a promotional single released off his second studio album Southside.

== Background and release ==
Hunt stated that the song is a "metaphor for a small-town guy who was raised with traditional values, a lot of those rooted in church and faith". He added "important we think about these things and don't accept rules because they are rules. We should try to understand the 'whys' behind the things we do, and the moral structure we apply to our lives".

Hunt debuted the song live at a "Bud Light House Party" event in Calgary, Alberta in September 2019. It was the first new song performed by Hunt after he had gone over two years since releasing the single "Downtown's Dead". He officially stated "Sinning with You" would be on his second studio album after performing it.

== Critical reception ==
Craig Shelburne of CMT stated that the song showed "serious reflection". Tammy Ragusa of One Country called the song "intimate and insightful", saying Hunt did not "deviate very far from what has worked in the past". Kelli Boyle of E! described "Sinning with You" as an "introspective look at religion and how a person's relationship with it can evolve over time". Heran Mamo of Billboard referred to the song as an "emotional reflection heard in the delicate guitar strings".

== Commercial performance ==
"Sinning with You" peaked at number 18 on the US Bubbling Under Hot 100 chart, and number 27 on the Hot Country Songs chart. It also reached a peak of number 38 on the Hot Canadian Digital Songs chart.

== Charts ==
Chart performance for "Sinning with You"
Chart (2020)	Peak position
Canada Digital Songs (Billboard)	38
US Bubbling Under Hot 100 (Billboard)	18
US Hot Country Songs (Billboard)	27
