= Drinkin' Too Much =

2017 song by Sam Hunt

Promotional single by Sam Hunt

from the album Southside
- Released: January 27, 2017
- Recorded: 2016
- Length: 3:51 (Southside); 4:38 (8pm)
- Label: MCA Nashville
- Songwriters: Sam Hunt; Zach Crowell; Shane McAnally; Stuart Hine
- Producer: Zach Crowell

Lyric video
- "Drinkin' Too Much" on YouTube

"Drinkin' Too Much" is a song recorded by American country singer Sam Hunt. He co-wrote the track with Shane McAnally, Stuart Hine, and producer Zach Crowell. It was included on his 2020 studio album Southside.

== Background and release ==
Hunt wrote the song as an apology to his former on-and-off girlfriend, and later wife, Hannah Lee Fowler. He said he struggled with deciding on whether to release the song or not due to its extremely personal nature, and that releasing "Drinkin' Too Much" made it "a lot easier to put out songs that are more honest". Fowler played the piano at the end of the song, with Hunt adding that he wanted to "have her blessing", and finish it with a "hopeful note".

The song was initially released by surprise on SoundCloud on New Year's Eve, with a later proper release occurring on January 27, 2017.

== Critical reception ==
Laura McClellan of Taste of Country stated that the "8pm" acoustic version of the track showed "another level of vulnerability and authenticity to the already-revealing ballad.

== Commercial performance ==
"Drinkin' Too Much" peaked at number 65 on the Billboard Canadian Hot 100. It also reached peaks of number 89 on the Hot 100 in the United States, and number 16 on the Hot Country Songs chart.

== Track listings ==
Digital download – single

1. "Drinkin' Too Much" – 3:51
2. "Drinkin' Too Much – 8pm" – 4:38

7-inch vinyl – single

1. "Drinkin' Too Much" – 3:51
2. "Drinkin' Too Much – 8pm" – 4:38

== Charts ==
Chart performance for "Drinkin' Too Much"
Chart (2017)	Peak position
Canada Hot 100 (Billboard)	65
US Billboard Hot 100	89
US Hot Country Songs (Billboard)	16

== Certifications ==
Certifications for "Drinkin' Too Much"
Region	Certification	Certified units/sales
Canada (Music Canada)	Gold	40,000^{‡}
^{‡} Sales+streaming figures based on certification alone.
