= Breaking Up Was Easy in the 90s =

2020 song by Sam Hunt

Single by Sam Hunt

from the album Southside
- Released: October 12, 2020
- Genre: Country
- Length: 3:35
- Label: MCA Nashville
- Songwriters: Sam Hunt; Zach Crowell; Chris LaCorte; Josh Osborne; Ernest Keith Smith
- Producer: Zach Crowell

Sam Hunt singles chronology
"Hard to Forget" (2020)	"Breaking Up Was Easy in the 90s" (2020)	"When Was It Over?" (2021)

Music video
- "Breaking Up Was Easy in the 90s" on YouTube

"Breaking Up Was Easy in the 90s" is a song by American country music singer Sam Hunt. It was released on October 12, 2020 as the fifth single from his second studio album Southside. Hunt wrote the song with Zach Crowell, Chris LaCorte, Ernest Keith Smith and Josh Osborne, and produced by Zach Crowell.

== Background ==
The song suggests that it was easier to cope with the end of a relationship before the existence of social media. Hunt said about the song: "The trick was not filling it up with a bunch of technology references and trying to find the story within it. It's just the world's so much smaller now. In a lot of ways, like the fact that I can release the record and still stay in touch with my fans, there's so many positives. But when it comes to relationships and navigating old relationships or new relationships and especially breakups, it can be tricky".

== Music video ==
The video was released on November 25, 2020, directed by Justin Clough. It is a story of a man who was just released from prison. As he tries to get his life back on track, the man finds himself haunted by memories of a past girlfriend.

== Live performance ==
Hunt performed the song on The Tonight Show Starring Jimmy Fallon.

== Charts ==
=== Weekly charts ===
Weekly chart performance for "Breaking Up Was Easy in the 90s"
Chart (2020–2021)	Peak position
Australia Country Hot 50 (TMN)	11
Canada Hot 100 (Billboard)	47
Canada Country (Billboard)	3
Global 200 (Billboard)	177
US Billboard Hot 100	32
US Country Airplay (Billboard)	1
US Hot Country Songs (Billboard)	4

=== Year-end charts ===
Year-end chart performance for "Breaking Up Was Easy in the 90s"
Chart (2021)	Position
US Country Airplay (Billboard)	24
US Hot Country Songs (Billboard)	24

== Certifications ==
Region	Certification	Certified units/sales
Canada (Music Canada)	Platinum	80,000^{‡}
United States (RIAA)	Platinum	1,000,000^{‡}
^{‡} Sales+streaming figures based on certification alone.
