= Southside (Sam Hunt album) =

Studio album by Sam Hunt
- Released: April 3, 2020
- Studio: Nashville, Tennessee
- Genre: Country; country pop; R&B
- Length: 39:01
- Label: MCA Nashville
- Producer: Zach Crowell; Luke Laird; Bryce Cain; Charlie Handsome

Sam Hunt chronology
Montevallo (2014)	Southside (2020)

Singles from Southside
- 1. "Body Like a Back Road" Released: February 2, 2017; 2. "Downtown's Dead" Released: May 16, 2018; 3. "Kinfolks" Released: October 11, 2019; 4. "Hard to Forget" Released: March 9, 2020; 5. "Breaking Up Was Easy in the 90s" Released: October 12, 2020

Southside (Note: stylized in all caps) is the second studio album by American country music singer Sam Hunt. It was released by MCA Nashville on April 3, 2020. It was slated to be supported by the Southside Summer Tour 2020, which would have featured guests Kip Moore, Travis Denning, Brandi Cyrus, and Ernest, and was set to begin in Charlotte, North Carolina, on May 28, 2020, but was canceled due to the COVID-19 pandemic.

== Background ==
Following the success of Hunt's debut album Montevallo, released in 2014, Hunt sporadically released several singles while delaying his second studio album. In the years between, he released the massive hit "Body Like a Back Road", "Downtown's Dead", as well as the track "Drinkin' Too Much". Hunt gave little details on when his second album would be released until the release of "Kinfolks" in October 2019, when he stated the full album would be released in 2020 and followed it up with the release of the track "Sinning with You" in January 2020. In February 2020, Hunt finally revealed the album title Southside as well as an April 2020 release date. The track "Hard to Forget" was soon released to coincide with the beginning of pre-orders, and was later announced to be the next single.

== Critical reception ==
Professional ratings
Aggregate scores
Source	Rating
Metacritic	72/100
Review scores
Source	Rating
AllMusic	3.5/5 stars
Robert Christgau	A−
Entertainment Weekly	B+
Pitchfork	7.5/10
Rolling Stone	3.5/5 stars
Slant Magazine	2/5 stars
Tom Hull	B+

Southside was met with generally positive reviews. At Metacritic, which assigns a normalized rating out of 100 to reviews from mainstream critics, the album holds an average score of 72 based on six reviews.

Writing for Rolling Stone, Jon Freeman highlighted the "thread of sensitivity" in Southside and opined that the album made Hunt "a crossover star". Chris DeVille of Stereogum positively compared the album to Montevallo, praising how the former contains "ever more adventurous packaging and a more seasoned perspective". In concurrence, Pitchfork's Natalie Weiner stated that the album "shows a clarity of purpose that his debut lacked" while also praising Hunt's "enviably organic" way of threading "the country/hip-hop needle". In a mixed review, Seth Wilson of Slant Magazine took note of the album's "ingratiating charm" but criticized its lyrical content. Robert Christgau awarded the album an A− grade in his online subscription letter praising in particular Hunt's "way with words" prevailing throughout the record, citing the chorus of 'Body Like a Back Road' as an example of his words cherishing "the American vernacular that imbues great pop songwriting from Irving Berlin to Jay-Z in a Nashville dialect that recalls John Prine".

=== Rankings ===
Critics' rankings for Southside
Publication	Accolade	Rank	Ref.
Billboard	Billboard's 50 Best Albums of 2020 – Mid-Year	—N/a	
Billboard	Billboard's 50 Best Albums of 2020	43	
The New York Times	Best Albums of 2020 (Jon Caramanica)	1	
Stereogum	Stereogum's 50 Best Albums of 2020 – Mid-Year	33	
Substream Magazine	Best Albums of 2020 (Logan White)	2	

== Commercial performance ==
Southside debuted at number five on the US Billboard 200, opening with 46,000 album-equivalent units, including 18,000 pure album sales. It earned the third-largest streaming week for a country album, and is Hunt's second US top-10 album.

== Track listing ==
Southside track listing
No.	Title	Writer(s)	Length
1.	"2016"	Sam Hunt; Zach Crowell; Josh Thompson	3:55
2.	"Hard to Forget"	Hunt; Ashley Gorley; Josh Osborne; Luke Laird; Shane McAnally; Autry Greisham; Mary Jean Shurtz; Russ Hull (Note: Contains a sample of "There Stands the Glass" by Webb Pierce.)	3:24
3.	"Kinfolks"	Hunt; Crowell; Jerry Flowers; Osborne	3:01
4.	"Young Once"	Hunt; Crowell; Matt Jenkins; Osborne	3:05
5.	"Body Like a Back Road"	Hunt; Crowell; McAnally; Osborne	2:42
6.	"That Ain't Beautiful"	Hunt; Crowell; McAnally	2:44
7.	"Let It Down"	Hunt; Crowell; Chris LaCorte; Osborne; Ernest Keith Smith	2:50
8.	"Downtown's Dead"	Hunt; Crowell; Osborne; McAnally; Charlie Handsome	3:33
9.	"Nothing Lasts Forever"	Hunt; Crowell; Osborne; McAnally	3:04
10.	"Sinning with You"	Hunt; Osborne; Paul DiGiovanni; Emily Weisband	3:16
11.	"Breaking Up Was Easy in the 90s"	Hunt; Crowell; LaCorte; Osborne; Smith	3:35
12.	"Drinkin' Too Much"	Hunt; Crowell; McAnally; Stuart Hine	3:52
Total length:			39:01

== Personnel ==
Adapted from Southside liner notes.

- Sam Hunt – guitar (track 5), lead vocals (all tracks)
- Gideon Boley – pedal steel guitar (track 3)
- Tim Braisted – bass guitar (track 8), background vocals (track 10)
- Josh Burkett – electric guitar (track 8), guitar (track 5)
- Bryce Cain – acoustic guitar (track 10), keyboards (track 10), programming (track 10)
- Tyrone Carreker – electric guitar (track 8), background vocals (track 10)
- Jamil Chammas – electric guitar (track 8)
- Dave Cohen – keyboards (track 10)
- Zach Crowell – bass guitar (track 3), acoustic guitar (track 6), keyboards (tracks 2–7, 9, 11, 12), programming (all tracks), background vocals (tracks 2–6, 8, 9)
- Ian Fitchuk – keyboards (tracks 5, 8), organ (track 5)
- Jeneé Fleenor – fiddle (tracks 2, 4, 9)
- Jerry Flowers – background vocals (track 3)
- Charlie Handsome – acoustic guitar (track 8), programming (track 8)
- Evan Hutchings – drums (track 8)
- Chris LaCorte – banjo (track 7), acoustic guitar (tracks 3, 7), electric guitar (track 7), keyboards (track 3)
- Luke Laird – acoustic guitar (track 2), electric guitar (track 2), programming (track 2)
- Devin Malone – cello (track 12), acoustic guitar (tracks 1, 4, 9, 11), electric guitar (tracks 3, 4, 8, 11), guitar (tracks 5, 12), pedal steel guitar (tracks 3, 9, 12)
- Josh Matheny – dobro (tracks 3, 7, 11), acoustic guitar (track 3)
- Anthony Olympia – dobro (track 8)
- Josh Osborne – guitar (track 5), background vocals (tracks 3, 5)
- Justin Ostrander – electric guitar (track 8)
- Russ Pahl – dobro (track 2), pedal steel guitar (tracks 1, 2, 6, 7, 11)
- Sol Philcox-Littlefield – electric guitar (track 4)
- Joshua Sales – drums (tracks 5, 8)
- Scotty Sanders – dobro (track 5), pedal steel guitar (tracks 5, 8)
- Jimmie Lee Sloas – bass guitar (tracks 1, 3, 4)
- Bryan Sutton – acoustic guitar (tracks 1, 10)
- Russell Terrell – background vocals (track 1)
- Ilya Toshinsky – banjo (tracks 3, 4), dobro (track 3), acoustic guitar (tracks 2–4, 11), electric guitar (tracks 8, 11)
- Derek Wells – electric guitar (track 3)
- Nir Z. – drums (tracks 3, 4)

== Charts ==
=== Weekly charts ===
Weekly chart performance for Southside
Chart (2020)	Peak position
Australian Albums (ARIA)	41
Australian Country Albums (ARIA)	3
Canadian Albums (Billboard)	4
UK Country Albums (OCC)	4
US Billboard 200	5
US Top Country Albums (Billboard)	1

=== Year-end charts ===
2020 year-end chart performance for Southside
Chart (2020)	Position
Australian Top Country Albums (ARIA)	28
US Billboard 200	100
US Top Country Albums (Billboard)	10

2021 year-end chart performance for Southside
Chart (2021)	Position
Australian Country Albums (ARIA)	27
US Billboard 200	146
US Top Country Albums (Billboard)	12

2022 year-end chart performance for Southside
Chart (2022)	Position
US Top Country Albums (Billboard)	35

== Certifications ==
Certifications for Southside
Region	Certification	Certified units/sales
Canada (Music Canada)	2× Platinum	160,000^{‡}
New Zealand (RMNZ)	Gold	7,500^{‡}
United States (RIAA)	2× Platinum	2,000,000^{‡}
^{‡} Sales+streaming figures based on certification alone.

== Release history ==
Release formats for Southside
Country	Date	Format	Label	Ref.
Various	April 3, 2020	Compact disc	MCA Nashville	
Various	April 3, 2020	Digital download	MCA Nashville	
Various	April 3, 2020	Streaming	MCA Nashville	
Various	July 17, 2020	Vinyl	MCA Nashville	
