= Hard to Forget =

2020 single by Sam Hunt

Single by Sam Hunt

from the album Southside
- Released: March 20, 2020
- Genre: Country pop
- Length: 3:24 (album version); 3:09 (radio edit)
- Label: MCA Nashville
- Songwriters: Sam Hunt; Ashley Gorley; Josh Osborne; Luke Laird; Shane McAnally; Audrey Grisham; Mary Jean Shurtz; Russ Hull
- Producers: Zach Crowell; Luke Laird

Sam Hunt singles chronology
"Kinfolks" (2019)	"Hard to Forget" (2020)	"Breaking Up Was Easy in the 90s" (2020)

Music video
- "Hard to Forget" on YouTube

"Hard to Forget" (radio edit)
- Radio edit cover

"Hard to Forget" is a song recorded by American country music singer Sam Hunt. It is the fourth single from his second studio album Southside. Hunt wrote the song with Ashley Gorley, Josh Osborne, Luke Laird, and Shane McAnally. The song contains a sample of Webb Pierce's 1953 hit "There Stands the Glass", whose writers Russ Hull, Audrey Grisham, and Mary Jean Shurtz are also credited.

== Content ==
The song's concept began when Luke Laird presented Hunt with the idea of sampling older country music songs, something which Laird had done in his spare time but had never publicly released. Laird then heard "There Stands the Glass" and presented the idea to Hunt. The two had attempted to fit the sample to a song they were working on titled "One Whiskey Away", but had no success. The two then presented the idea to Shane McAnally and Josh Osborne, who were working with Hunt on a song titled "Hard to Forget". All of the writers then took the partially-formed ideas from "One Whiskey Away" and "Hard to Forget", and worked to incorporate new lyrics around the sample. Laird then assembled a demo which was given to Hunt's producer Zach Crowell. Crowell adjusted the tempo of the song and added instrumentation from session musicians such as Ilya Toshinsky and Jenee Fleenor. The final recording also features vocal ad-libs from Hunt's road band, as well as Gorley's daughter and her friends.

Wendy Hermanson and Billy Dukes of Taste of Country wrote of the song that "the overall result isn't 100 percent a traditional country song. Rather, it's a brilliant meld of old-school country with a distinctly modern, multi-groove tone". She also noted a "rollicking pop, almost reggae vibe". Webb Pierce's son, Webb Pierce Jr., praised the song for bringing his father's music to a younger audience.

== Chart performance ==
=== Weekly charts ===
Weekly chart performance for "Hard to Forget"
Chart (2020)	Peak position
Australia Country Hot 50 (TMN)	10
Canada Hot 100 (Billboard)	32
Canada Country (Billboard)	2
US Billboard Hot 100	26
US Country Airplay (Billboard)	1
US Hot Country Songs (Billboard)	3
US Rolling Stone Top 100	20

=== Year-end charts ===
2020 year-end chart performance for "Hard to Forget"
Chart (2020)	Position
Canada (Canadian Hot 100)	89
US Billboard Hot 100	69
US Country Airplay (Billboard)	24
US Hot Country Songs (Billboard)	12

== Certifications ==
Certifications and sales for "Hard to Forget"
Region	Certification	Certified units/sales
Canada (Music Canada)	3× Platinum	240,000^{‡}
United States (RIAA)	2× Platinum	2,000,000^{‡}
^{‡} Sales+streaming figures based on certification alone.
