= Wishful Drinking (song) =

Single by Ingrid Andress and Sam Hunt

from the album Good Person
- Released: August 2, 2021
- Genre: Country
- Length: 3:14
- Label: Warner Nashville
- Songwriters: Ingrid Andress; Jonny Price; JP Saxe; Lucky Daye; Rykeyz
- Producers: Ingrid Andress; Jordan Schmidt

Ingrid Andress singles chronology
"Lady Like" (2020)	"Wishful Drinking" (2021)	"Seeing Someone Else" (2022)

Sam Hunt singles chronology
"23" (2021)	"Wishful Drinking" (2021)	"Water Under the Bridge" (2022)

Music video
- "Wishful Drinking" on YouTube

"Wishful Drinking" is a song by American country music singers Ingrid Andress and Sam Hunt. It was made available digitally on August 2, 2021, and released to country radio on December 13, 2021. Andress co-wrote the song with Jonny Price, JP Saxe, Lucky Daye, and Rykeyz, and produced it with Jordan Schmidt. It is the lead single from Andress' second studio album Good Person.

== Background and composition ==
"Wishful Drinking" is the first duet between the artists. Andress stated in a press release: "I've never done anything like 'Wishful Drinking' before, I've always wanted to work with Sam and have been such a fan of his for a long time. I admire how he stays so true to himself and am so happy to have him join me for my first collaboration. The song was co-written by my friend JP Saxe, and it became this amazing sad bop, which we all know I love". Hunt said: "I heard Ingrid's music a while back and knew right away she was a very talented singer and songwriter, I met her not long ago at a Nashville Sports League kickball game and I really enjoyed getting to know her a little bit. When the opportunity came along to be a part of this song with her, I was all in". Lauren Jo Black of Country Now described the song as "a story of a couple who is trying to move past a breakup and find themselves thinking of one another when they drink". Rolling Stone's Jon Freeman stated that "Wishful Drinking" has a "sleek, R&B-flavored production" containing "hints of Dobro and acoustic guitar".

== Critical reception ==
Luana Harumi of V magazine wrote that the song "is a moving country-pop ballad that perfectly combines Andress's soft pitch and Sam Hunt's husky vocals". Kelly Brickey of Sounds Like Nashville commented that it "spins with a modern buzz that mixes clever lines with a strong beat over ice for a sound that goes down easy".

== Music video ==
The music video was released on August 2, 2021, and filmed at the Flamingo Cocktail Club in Nashville, Tennessee. The video features "vintage-inspired fashion and '70s glam" and showcases Andress and Hunt "performing the song from across the room before getting up to sing on a small stage in the bar".

== Charts ==
=== Weekly charts ===
Weekly chart performance for "Wishful Drinking"
Chart (2021–2022)	Peak position
Canada Country (Billboard)	8
US Billboard Hot 100	47
US Country Airplay (Billboard)	4
US Hot Country Songs (Billboard)	11

=== Year-end charts ===
2022 year-end chart performance for "Wishful Drinking"
Chart (2022)	Position
US Country Airplay (Billboard)	10
US Hot Country Songs (Billboard)	13
US Radio Songs (Billboard)	71

== Certifications ==
Certifications for "Wishful Drinking"
Region	Certification	Certified units/sales
Canada (Music Canada)	Gold	40,000^{‡}
United States (RIAA)	Platinum	1,000,000^{‡}
^{‡} Sales+streaming figures based on certification alone.

== Release history ==
Release history for "Wishful Drinking"
Region	Date	Format	Label	Ref.
Various	August 2, 2021	Digital download; streaming	Warner Nashville	
United States	December 13, 2021	Country radio	Warner Nashville	
