= Josh Osborne =

American singer-songwriter (born c.1980)

Background information
- Born: Virgie, Kentucky, U.S.
- Genres: Country
- Occupation: Songwriter
- Instruments: Vocals; guitar
- Years active: 1998–present

Josh Osborne (born c. 1980) is an American songwriter with several number-one singles to his credit.

== Early life ==
Josh Osborne was born in Pike County, Kentucky, and raised in Virgie, Kentucky. Osborne grew up on US 23, renamed Country Music Highway by the state of Kentucky in honor of the many country music artists who had come from the area, and developed a deep love of country music, particularly artists like Keith Whitley and Dwight Yoakam. Josh graduated from Shelby Valley High School in 1998 and moved right after graduation to Nashville where he signed his first publishing deal with Warner Chappell Music.

== Career ==
Josh Osborne signed a publishing agreement with Black River Entertainment in 2010. In 2015, Osborne announced he was joining Shane McAnally's company, SMACKSongs as a partner and songwriter. SMACKSongs currently represents McAnally, as well as Josh Jenkins, Ryan Beaver, Aaron Eshuis, and Walker Hayes among other writers. Osborne is a multi-platinum, GRAMMY Award winning songwriter based in Nashville, Tenn. who has notched 23 No. 1s on the Country charts. He earned his first No. 1 with Kenny Chesney’s "Come Over," in 2012. Since the Platinum-selling hit, Osborne has received countless cuts by Country’s hottest artists including Sam Hunt, Miranda Lambert, Kacey Musgraves, Blake Shelton, Keith Urban and more.

Osborne has since written other Billboard Country Airplay chart-topping songs, including "Drunk Last Night," recorded by Eli Young Band, "My Eyes," performed by Blake Shelton featuring Gwen Sebastian, "We Are Tonight," sung by Billy Currington, "Leave the Night On" and "Take Your Time" by Sam Hunt, "Wild Child", written with Chesney and frequent collaborator Shane McAnally featuring Grace Potter, "Sangria" performed by Blake Shelton, Jake Owen's "Real Life", "John Cougar, John Deere, John 3:16", performed by Keith Urban, Tim McGraw's "Top of the World", "Setting the World on Fire" performed by Kenny Chesney featuring Pink, the Grammy and Academy of Country Music Award nominated "Vice" performed by Miranda Lambert, Midland's "Drinking Problem" (which he also produced), and Kenny Chesney's "All the Pretty Girls". Osborne has been nominated for over 20 awards by the Academy of Country Music, American Country Awards, ASCAP, Billboard Music Awards, Country Music Association, Music Row and NARAS. Kacey Musgraves’ "Merry Go 'Round," written by Osborne, Shane McAnally and Musgraves, earned Osborne four nominations and won Song Of The Year at the 2013 Music Row Awards and Best Country Song at the 2014 GRAMMY Awards. Also in 2014, Osborne was honored by having his name added to the prestigious Country Music Highway, which runs through the state of Kentucky and near his hometown of Virgie. RIAA Certified Double Platinum No. 1 hit, "Take Your Time," recorded by Sam Hunt and written by Osborne, McAnally and Hunt, earned Osborne a nomination for Song of the Year at the 2015 CMA Awards. 2015 also brought several wins at the ASCAP Awards — earning Osborne Song of the Year for Sam Hunt's "Leave the Night On" and Songwriter of the Year. In 2017, Miranda Lambert's "Vice," written by Osborne, McAnally and Lambert, was nominated for Best Country Song at the GRAMMY Awards and Song of the Year at the ACM Awards. Osborne has been nominated five times for Songwriter of the Year by the ACM and has received multiple CMA Triple Play Awards for having three No. 1 songs on the charts in a 12-month period. Osborne earned a 5× Platinum No.1 with “Body Like A Back Road,” written by Sam Hunt, Shane McAnally, Osborne, and Zach Crowell. The single made history as the longest reigning No. 1 on the Billboard Hot Country Song chart by a solo artist, spending 34 weeks atop the chart and was named ASCAP's 2018 Song of the Year. Most recently, he won Song of the Year at the 2020 ACM Awards for co-writing Old Dominion’s “One Man Band.”

== Awards and nominations ==
Year	Association	Category	Nominated work	Result
2013	American Country Awards	Song of the Year	"Merry Go Round"	Nominated
2013	Country Music Association Awards	Song of the Year	"Merry Go Round"	Nominated
2013	MusicRow Awards	Song of the Year	"Merry Go Round"	Won
2014	Grammy Awards	Best Country Song	"Merry Go Round"	Won
2015	Academy of Country Music Awards	Songwriter of the Year	—N/a	Nominated
2015	Country Music Association Awards	Song of the Year	"Take Your Time"	Nominated
2015	ASCAP Country Awards	Songwriter of the Year	"Take Your Time"	Won
2016	Academy of Country Music Awards	Songwriter of the Year	—N/a	Nominated
2016	Academy of Country Music Awards	Single Record of the Year	"Take Your Time"	Nominated
2016	AIMP Nashville Awards	Song of the Year	"John Cougar, John Deere, John 3:16"	Nominated
2016	AIMP Nashville Awards	Song of the Year	"Take Your Time"	Nominated
2016	Grammy Awards	Best Country Song	"Vice"	Nominated
2017	AIMP Nashville Awards	Song of the Year	"Vice"	Nominated
2017	Academy of Country Music Awards	Song of the Year	"Vice"	Nominated
2017	CMT Artist of the Year Awards	Song of the Year	"Body Like a Back Road"	Nominated
2017	Grammy Awards	Best Country Song	"Body Like a Back Road"	Nominated
2017	Grammy Awards	Best Country Song	"Drinkin' Problem"	Nominated
2018	Academy of Country Music Awards	Song of the Year	"Body Like A Back Road"	Nominated
2018	Academy of Country Music Awards	Songwriter of the Year	—N/a	Nominated
2018	Academy of Country Music Awards	Single Record of the Year	"Drinkin' Problem"	Nominated
2018	Country Music Association Awards	Song of the Year	"Body Like A Back Road"	Nominated
2018	Country Music Association Awards	Single of the Year	"Drinkin' Problem"	Nominated
2018	Billboard Music Awards	Top Country Song	"Body Like A Back Road"	Won
2018	AIMP Nashville Awards	Songwriter of the Year	—N/a	Nominated
2018	AIMP Nashville Awards	Song of the Year	"Drinkin' Problem"	Won
2018	AIMP Nashville Awards	Single of the Year	"Drinkin' Problem"	Nominated
2018	ASCAP Country Music Awards	Song of the Year	"Body Like a Back Road"	Nominated
2019	AIMP Nashville Awards	Songwriter of the Year	—N/a	Nominated
2019	Academy of Country Music Awards	Songwriter of the Year	—N/a	Nominated
2019	MusicRow Awards	Male Songwriter of the Year	—N/a	Won
2020	Academy of Country Music Awards	Songwriter of the Year	—N/a	Nominated
2020	Academy of Country Music Awards	Song of the Year	"One Man Band"	Won
2020	MusicRow Awards	Male Songwriter of the Year	—N/a	Nominated
2021	MusicRow Country Breakout Awards	Songwriter of the Year	—N/a	Won
2021	Academy of Country Music Awards	Songwriter of the Year	—N/a	Nominated
2021	ASCAP Pop Awards	Performance Award	Hard to Forget	Won
2021	ASCAP Pop Awards	Performance Award	Kinfolks	Won
2021	ASCAP Pop Awards	Performance Award	Nobody But You	Won
2021	ASCAP Pop Awards	Performance Award	One Man Band	Won
2021	MusicRow Awards	Male Songwriter of the Year	—N/a	Nominated
2021	MusicRow Awards	Song of the Year	Next Girl	Nominated
2021	Country Music Association Awards	Album of the Year	"29"	Nominated
2021	ASCAP Country Music Awards	Songwriter of the Year	—N/a	Won
2021	ASCAP Country Music Awards	Performance Award	7 Summers	Won
2021	ASCAP Country Music Awards	Performance Award	Beers and Sunshine	Won
2021	ASCAP Country Music Awards	Performance Award	Breaking Up Was Easy in the 90s	Won
2021	ASCAP Country Music Awards	Performance Award	Happy Anywhere	Won
2021	ASCAP Country Music Awards	Performance Award	Hard to Forget	Won
2021	ASCAP Country Music Awards	Performance Award	How They Remember You	Won
2021	ASCAP Country Music Awards	Performance Award	Next Girl	Won
2021	ASCAP Country Music Awards	Performance Award	Nobody But You	Won
2022	Academy of Country Music Awards	Album of the Year	29: Written in Stone	Nominated
2022	Academy of Country Music Awards	Song of the Year	"7 Summers"	Nominated
2022	Academy of Country Music Awards	Music Event of the Year	"Never Wanted to Be That Girl"	Won
2022	Academy of Country Music Awards	Songwriter of the Year	—N/a	Nominated
2022	MusicRow Awards	Male Songwriter of the Year	—N/a	Nominated
2022	Country Music Association Awards	Song of the Year	"Sand In My Boots"	Nominated
2022	Country Music Association Awards	Single of the Year	"Never Wanted to Be That Girl"	Nominated
2022	Country Music Association Awards	Musical Event of the Year	"Never Wanted to Be That Girl"	Nominated
2022	Country Music Association Awards	Musical Event of the Year	"Longneck Way To Go"	Nominated

== Producer ==
Osborne has produced or co-produced the following works:

Year	Artist	Type	Project
2016	Midland	EP	Midland EP
2017	Midland	Album	On the Rocks
2019	Midland	Album	Let It Roll
2020	Carly Pearce	Single	Next Girl
2021	Carly Pearce	EP	29
2021	Midland	EP	The Last Resort
2021	Carly Pearce	Track	"Dear Miss Loretta"
2021	Carly Pearce	Album	29: Written In Stone
2022	Midland	Album	"The Last Resort: Greetings From"

== Songwriting discography ==
Songs written or co-written by Osborne.

Year	Artist	Album	Song	Co-writer(s)
2011	Sarah Darling	Angels & Devils	"Bad Habit"	Sarah Darling, Shane McAnally
2011	Sarah Darling	Angels & Devils	"The Boy Never Stays"	Sarah Darling, Brandy Clark
2011	Chris Young	Neon	"Neon"	Shane McAnally, Trevor Rosen
2012	Greg Bates	Greg Bates	"Fill In the Blank"	Greg Bates, Shane McAnally
2012	Kenny Chesney	Welcome to the Fishbowl	"Come Over"	Shane McAnally, Sam Hunt
2012	Love and Theft	Love and Theft	"Runnin' Out of Air"	Matt Jenkins, Shane McAnally
2012	Hayden Panettiere	Nashville Season 1	"Boys and Buses"	Brandy Clark, Shane McAnally
2012	The Lost Trailers	American Beauty	"American Beauty"	Mason Douglas, Matt Jenkins
2013	The Band Perry	Pioneer	"Chainsaw"	Shane McAnally, Matthew Ramsey
2013	Luke Bryan	Crash My Party	"Goodbye Girl"	Shane McAnally, Matthew Ramsey
2013	Kelly Clarkson	—N/a	"Tie It Up"	Ashley Arrison, Shane McAnally
2013	Billy Currington	We Are Tonight	"We Are Tonight"	Marc Beeson, Sam Hunt
2013	Due West	Our Time	"End of the Road"	Brad Hull, Matt Lopez
2013	Due West	Our Time	"Taste of Your Love"	Matt Lopez, Trevor Rosen
2013	Scotty McCreery	See You Tonight	"Feel Good Summer Song"	Shane McAnally, J. T. Harding
2013	Tim McGraw	Two Lanes of Freedom	"It's Your World"	Scott Stepakoff, Shane McAnally
2013	Craig Morgan	The Journey (Livin' Hits)	"Wake Up Lovin' You"	Matthew Ramsey, Trevor Rosen
2013	Kacey Musgraves	Same Trailer Different Park	"Silver Lining"	Kacey Musgraves, Shane McAnally
2013	Kacey Musgraves	Same Trailer Different Park	"My House"	Kacey Musgraves, Shane McAnally
2013	Kacey Musgraves	Same Trailer Different Park	"Merry Go 'Round"	Kacey Musgraves, Shane McAnally
2013	Kacey Musgraves	Same Trailer Different Park	"I Miss You"	Kacey Musgraves, Luke Laird
2013	Kacey Musgraves	Same Trailer Different Park	"Stupid"	Kacey Musgraves, Shane McAnally
2013	Randy Rogers Band	Trouble	"Fuzzy"	Shane McAnally, Trevor Rosen
2013	Blake Shelton	Based on a True Story…	"My Eyes" (featuring Gwen Sebastian)	Andrew Dorff, Tommy Lee James
2013	Charlie Worsham	Rubberband	"Break What's Broken"	Charlie Worsham, Shane McAnally
2013	Chris Young	A.M.	"Hold You To It"	Chris Young, Shane McAnally
2013	Chris Young	A.M.	"Text Me Texas"	Rhett Akins, Shane McAnally
2014	Dierks Bentley	—N/a	"Ride On" (History Channel Theme Song) for Biker Battleground Phoenix	Dierks Bentley
2014	Connie Britton	The Music of Nashville: Season 3, Volume 1	"Lies of the Lonely"	Natalie Hemby, Shane McAnally
2014	Kenny Chesney	The Big Revival	"Wild Child"	Kenny Chesney, Shane McAnally
2014	Sara Evans	Slow Me Down	"You Never Know"	Sara Evans, Shane McAnally
2014	Sam Hunt	Montevallo	"Leave the Night On"	Sam Hunt, Shane McAnally
2014	Sam Hunt	Montevallo	"Take Your Time"	Sam Hunt, Shane McAnally
2014	Sam Hunt	Montevallo	"Ex To See"	Sam Hunt, Matthew Ramsey
2014	Sam Hunt	Montevallo	"Make You Miss Me"	Sam Hunt, Matthew Ramsey
2014	Sam Hunt	Montevallo	"Single for The Summer"	Sam Hunt, Zach Crowell, Shane McAnally
2014	Josh Abbott Band	—N/a	"Hangin' Around"	Josh Abbott, Shane McAnally
2014	Dustin Lynch	Where It's At	"Sing It To Me"	Dustin Lynch, Jimmy Robbins
2014	Tim McGraw	Sundown Heaven Town	"Overrated"	Shane McAnally, Rivers Rutherford
2014	Kacey Musgraves	The Best of Me Soundtrack	"Love Is a Liar"	Kacey Musgraves, Shane McAnally
2014	Blake Shelton	Bringing Back the Sunshine	"Sangria"	J.T. Harding, Trevor Rosen
2014	Trisha Yearwood	PrizeFighter: Hit After Hit	"End Of The World"	Shane McAnally, Trevor Rosen
2014	Eli Young Band	10,000 Towns	"Drunk Last Night"	Laura Veltz
2014	Eli Young Band	10,000 Towns	"Dust"	Jon Jones, John Young, Kyle Jacobs
2015	Josh Abbott Band	Amnesia	"Amnesia"	Josh Abbott, Shane McAnally
2015	Kelsea Ballerini	The First Time	"Square Pegs"	Kelsea Ballerini, Scott Stepakoff
2015	Laura Bell Bundy	Another Piece of Me	"Let's Pretend We're Married"	Laura Bell Bundy, Shane McAnally
2015	Billy Currington	Summer Forever	"Wake Me Up"	Ashley Gorley, Jimmy Robbins
2015	Billy Currington	Summer Forever	"Nowhere Town"	Chris Lindsey, Aimee Mayo
2015	Josh Dorr	—N/a	"Before The Summer Dies"	Josh Dorr, Marty Dodson
2015	Pat Green	Home	"Day One"	Shane McAnally, Matthew Ramsey
2015	Lucas Hoge	Halabamalujah	"Halabamalujah"	Sam Hunt
2015	Sam Hunt	Between the Pines	"Leave the Night On"	Sam Hunt, Shane McAnally
2015	Sam Hunt	Between the Pines	"Take Your Time"	Sam Hunt, Shane McAnally
2015	Sam Hunt	Between the Pines	"Ex To See"	Sam Hunt, Matthew Ramsey
2015	Sam Hunt	Between the Pines	"Make You Miss Me"	Sam Hunt, Matthew Ramsey
2015	Sam Hunt	Between the Pines	"Single for The Summer"	Sam Hunt, Zach Crowell, Shane McAnally
2015	Sam Hunt	Between the Pines	"Come Over"	Shane McAnally, Sam Hunt
2015	Sam Hunt	Between the Pines	"Saturday Night"	Sam Hunt, Marc Beeson
2015	Reba McEntire	Love Somebody	"Until They Don't Love You"	Lori McKenna, Shane McAnally
2015	Reba McEntire	Love Somebody	"Love Somebody"	Sam Hunt, Shane McAnally
2015	Reba McEntire	Love Somebody	"Whatever Way It Hurts The Least"	Tommy Lee James, Brandy Clark
2015	Reba McEntire	Love Somebody	"More Than Just Her Last Name"	Brandy Clark, Shane McAnally
2015	Tim McGraw	Damn Country Music	"Top of the World"	Jimmy Robbins, Jon Nite
2015	Kacey Musgraves	Pageant Material	"Late to the Party"	Kacey Musgraves, Brandy Clark
2015	Kacey Musgraves	Pageant Material	"Somebody to Love"	Kacey Musgraves, Shane McAnally
2015	Kacey Musgraves	Pageant Material	"Miserable"	Kacey Musgraves, Brandy Clark
2015	Kacey Musgraves	Pageant Material	"Family Is Family"	Kacey Musgraves, Shane McAnally
2015	Kacey Musgraves	Pageant Material	"Cup of Tea"	Kacey Musgraves, Shane McAnally
2015	Old Dominion	Meat and Candy	"Crazy Beautiful Sexy"	Matthew Ramsey, Ross Copperman
2015	Jake Owen	Real Life (Single)	"Real Life"	Ross Copperman, Ashley Gorley, Shane McAnally
2015	Kellie Pickler	Feeling Tonight (Single)	"Feeling Tonight"	Sarah Buxton, Jimmy Robbins
2015	Keith Urban	Ripcord	"John Cougar, John Deere, John 3:16"	Ross Copperman, Shane McAnally
2016	Brandy Clark	Big Day in a Small Town	"Broke"	Shane McAnally, Brandy Clark
2016	Craig Morgan	A Whole Lot More to Me	"Living on Memories"	Scott Stepakoff, Craig Morgan
2016	Jennifer Nettles	Playing with Fire	"My House" (feat. Jennifer Lopez)	Jennifer Nettles, Julio Reyes Copello, Jennifer Lopez, Shane McAnally
2016	Jake Owen	American Love	"Everybody Dies Young"	Shane McAnally, Ross Copperman, Scott Stepakoff
2016	Kenny Chesney	Cosmic Hallelujah	"Some Town Somewhere"	Ross Copperman, Heather Morgan
2016	Kenny Chesney	Cosmic Hallelujah	"Setting the World on Fire"(feat. Pink)	Ross Copperman, Matt Jenkins
2016	Kenny Chesney	Cosmic Hallelujah	"All the Pretty Girls"	Tommy Lee James, Nicolle Galyon
2016	Kenny Chesney	Cosmic Hallelujah	"Rich and Miserable"	Jesse Frasure, Shane McAnally
2016	Jo Smith	Introducing Jo Smith	"Dance Dirty"	Jo Smith, Shane McAnally, Jesse Frasure
2016	Jo Smith	Introducing Jo Smith	"Queen of Fools"	Jo Smith, Shane McAnally, Jesse Frasure
2016	Jo Smith	Introducing Jo Smith	"Poster Child"	Jo Smith, Jesse Frasure
2016	Kacey Musgraves	A Very Kacey Christmas	"A Willie Nice Christmas"	Shane McAnally, Kacey Musgraves
2016	Midland	Midland - EP	"Electric Rodeo"	Shane McAnally, Cameron Duddy, Mark Wystrach, Jess Carson
2016	Midland	Midland - EP	"Drinkin' Problem"	Shane McAnally, Cameron Duddy, Mark Wystrach, Jess Carson
2016	Midland	Midland - EP	"Burn Out"	Shane McAnally, Cameron Duddy, Mark Wystrach, Jess Carson
2017	Sam Hunt	Single	"Body Like a Backroad"	Shane McAnally, Sam Hunt, Zach Crowell
2017	Parmalee	27861	"Sunday Morning"	Ross Copperman, Matt Thomas
2017	Logan Mize	Come Back Road	"All Time"	Shane McAnally, Luke Dick
2017	Walker Hayes	8 Track (Vol 2) Break the Internet	"Break the Internet"	Shane McAnally, Walker Hayes
2017	Walker Hayes	8 Track (Vol 2) Break the Internet	"Face on my Money"	Walker Hayes, Nicolle Galyon
2017	Eli Young Band	Fingerprints	"Like A Heart Needs A Break"	Shane McAnally, Ross Copperman
2017	Old Dominion	Happy Endings	"Hotel Key"	Matthew Ramsey, Trevor Rosen
2017	Old Dominion	Happy Endings	"Stars in the City"	Matthew Ramsey, Trevor Rosen, Brad Tursi
2017	Old Dominion	Happy Endings	"Can't Get You"	Matthew Ramsey, Andrew Dorff
2017	Brandy Clark	Single	"You're Drunk"	Shane McAnally, Brandy Clark
2017	Lucas Hoge	Dirty South	"Halabamalujah"	Shane McAnally, Sam Hunt
2017	Lindsay Ell	The Project	"Just Another Girl"	Shane McAnally, Lindsay Ell
2017	Drake White	Spark	"Live Some"	Shane McAnally, Ross Copperman, Drake White
2017	Dallas Smith	Side Effects	"Sky Stays This Blue"	Ashley Gorley, Ross Copperman
2017	Thomas Rhett	Life Changes	"Smooth Like the Summer"	Shane McAnally, Thomas Rhett, Jesse Frasure
2017	Thomas Rhett	Life Changes	"When We're 80" (Bonus Track)	Shane McAnally, Thomas Rhett, Jesse Frasure
2017	Midland	On the Rocks	"Drinkin' Problem"	Cameron Duddy, Mark Wystrach, Jess Carson, Shane McAnally
2017	Midland	On the Rocks	"Burn Out"	Cameron Duddy, Mark Wystrach, Jess Carson, Shane McAnally
2017	Midland	On the Rocks	"Electric Rodeo"	Cameron Duddy, Mark Wystrach, Jess Carson, Shane McAnally
2017	Midland	On the Rocks	"Make a Little	Cameron Duddy, Mark Wystrach, Jess Carson, Shane McAnally
2017	Midland	On the Rocks	"More Than a Fever"	Cameron Duddy, Mark Wystrach, Jess Carson, Shane McAnally
2017	Midland	On the Rocks	"Somewhere On the Wind"	Cameron Duddy, Mark Wystrach, Jess Carson, Rhett Akins
2017	Midland	On the Rocks	"Lonely for You Only"	Cameron Duddy, Mark Wystrach, Jess Carson, Rhett Akins
2017	Midland	On the Rocks	"Nothing New Under Neon"	Cameron Duddy, Mark Wystrach, Jess Carson, Shane McAnally
2017	Jana Kramer	Single	"I've Done Love"	Shane McAnally, Nicolle Galyon
2017	Dierks Bentley	The Shack Soundtrack	"Days of Dark"	Dierks Bentley, R. Tyndall
2017	Miranda Lambert	Weight of These Wings	"Vice"	Shane McAnally, Miranda Lambert
2017	Dustin Lynch	Current Mood	"I Wish You Were Beer"	Jon Nite, Justin Ebach
2017	Darius Rucker	When Was the Last Time	"Twenty Something"	Shane McAnally, Jon Nite, Zach Crowell
2017	Blake Shelton	Texoma	"Turnin' Me On"	Jessi Alexander, Blake Shelton
2017	Blake Shelton	Texoma	"The Wave"	Ross Copperman
2017	A Thousand Horses	Bridges	"One Man Army"	Ross Copperman, M. Hobby
2017	Tracy Lawrence	Good Ole Days	"Good Ole Days"	Shane McAnally, Chris DeStefano
2017	LANCO	Hallelujah Nights	"Born to Love You"	Ashley Gorley, Ross Copperman, Brandon Lancaster
2017	Jerrod Niemann	This Ride	"I Got This"	Jimmy Robbins, Jon Nite
2017	Jerrod Niemann	This Ride	"But I Do"	Rodney Clawson, Luke Dick
2018
2018	Hilary Williams	My Lucky Scars	The Day After the Circus	Shane McAnally, Natalie Hemby
2018	Kenny Chesney	Songs for the Saints	"Every Heart"	Shane McAnally
2018	Kenny Chesney	Songs for the Saints	"Get Along"	Shane McAnally, Ross Copperman
2018	Keith Urban	Graffiti U	"Drop Top"	Keith Urban, Jimmy Robbins, Maureen McDonald
2018	Drake White	Pieces	"Happy Place"	Drake White, busbee
2018	Sam Hunt	Single	"Downtown's Dead"	Sam Hunt, Shane McAnally, Zach Crowell
2018	Michael Ray	Amos	"Fan Girl"	Matt Jenkins, Brad Tursi
2018	Michael Ray	Amos	"One That Got Away"	Matt Ramsey, Trevor Rosen, Jesse Frasure
2018	Morgan Evans	Things That We Drink To	"American"	Morgan Evans, Chris DeStefano
2018	Morgan Evans	Things That We Drink To	"Kiss Somebody"	Morgan Evans, Chris DeStefano
2018	Morgan Evans	Things That We Drink To	"Me On You"	Morgan Evans, Chris DeStefano
2018	Morgan Evans	Things That We Drink To	"Things That We Drink To"	Morgan Evans, Chris DeStefano
2018	Blake Shelton	Texoma Shore	"Turnin' Me On"	Blake Shelton, Jessi Alexander
2019	Teddy Robb	—N/a	"Really Shouldn't Drink Around You"	Shane McAnally, Trevor Rosen
2019	Thomas Rhett	Center Point Road	"Things You Do For Love"	Thomas Rhett, Ashley Gorley, Jesse Frasure, Luke Laird
2019	Midland	Let It Roll	"Mr. Lonely"	Shane McAnally, Cameron Duddy, Jess Carson, Mark Wystrach
2019	Midland	Let It Roll	"Put The Hurt On Me"	Shane McAnally, Cameron Duddy, Jess Carson, Mark Wystrach
2019	Midland	Let It Roll	"I Love You, Goodbye"	Shane McAnally, Cameron Duddy, Jess Carson, Mark Wystrach
2019	Ben Gallaher	—N/a	"Love You Like America"	Tom Douglas (songwriter), Jaren Johnston, Ross Copperman
2019	Old Dominion	Old Dominion	"My Heart Is A Bar"	Shane McAnally, Trevor Rosen, Matthew Ramsey, Brad Tursi
2019	Old Dominion	Old Dominion	"One Man Band"	Trevor Rosen, Matthew Ramsey, Brad Tursi
2019	Old Dominion	Old Dominion	"Paint The Grass Green"	Trevor Rosen, Matthew Ramsey, Brad Tursi, Ross Copperman
2019	Old Dominion	Old Dominion	"Can't Get You"	Matthew Ramsey, Andrew Dorff
2019	Old Dominion	Old Dominion	"Goes Without Saying"	Matthew Ramsey, Andrew Dorff
2019	Old Dominion	Old Dominion	"Everything To Lose"	Matthew Ramsey, Matt Dragstrem
2019	LANCO	Lessons Learned	"Old Camaro"	Brandon Lancaster, Justin Ebach
2019	Sam Hunt	Southside	"Kinfolks"	Sam Hunt, Zach Crowell, Jerry Flowers
2019	Kaleb Lee feat. Kelly Clarkson	—N/a	"I Dream In Southern"	Shane McAnally, Brandy Clark
2019	Blake Shelton feat. Gwen Stefani	Fully Loaded: God's Country	"Nobody But You"	Shane McAnally, Tommy Lee James, Ross Copperman
2019	Blake Shelton	Fully Loaded: God's Country	"Turnin' Me On"	Blake Shelton, Jessi Alexander
2020
2020	Adam Brand	Speed Of Life	"Just A Love Song"	Shane McAnally, Preston Brust, Chris Lucas
2020	Kelsea Ballerini	kelsea	"Overshare"	Jesse Frasure, Kelsea Ballerini, Tayla Parx
2020	Sam Hunt	Southside	"Sinning with You"	Sam Hunt, Emily Weisband, Paul DiGiovanni
2020	Sam Hunt	Southside	"Hard to Forget"	Shane McAnally, Sam Hunt, Luke Laird, Ashley Gorley, Russ Hull, Mary Jean Shurtz, Audrey Greisham
2020	Sam Hunt	Southside	"Young Once"	Sam Hunt, Zach Crowell, Matt Jenkins
2020	Sam Hunt	Southside	"Let It Down"	Sam Hunt, Zach Crowell, Chris LaCorte, Ernest K. Smith
2020	Sam Hunt	Southside	"Nothing Lasts Forever"	Shane McAnally, Sam Hunt, Zach Crowell
2020	Sam Hunt	Southside	"Breaking Up Was Easy in the 90s"	Sam Hunt, Zach Crowell, Chris LaCorte, Ernest K. Smith
2020	Sam Hunt	Southside	"Body Like A Back Road"	Shane McAnally, Sam Hunt, Zach Crowell
2020	Sam Hunt	Southside	"Downtown's Dead"	Shane McAnally, Sam Hunt, Zach Crowell, Ryan "Charlie Handsome" Vojtesak
2020	Teddy Robb	Teddy Robb - EP	"Really Shouldn't Drink Around You"	Shane McAnally, Trevor Rosen
2020	Shawn Austin	Single	"Send It My Way"	Matt Dragstrem, Andrew Dorff
2020	Walker Hayes	Single	"Trash My Heart"	Walker Hayes, Josh Jenkins, Matt Jenkins, Jimmy Robbins
2020	Kenny Chesney	Here and Now	"Everyone She Knows"	Shane McAnally, Ross Copperman
2020	Kenny Chesney	Here and Now	"Heartbreakers"	J.T. Harding, Zach Crowell
2020	Drew Baldridge	—N/a	"When I Fall"	Shane McAnally, Matthew Ramsey
2020	Midland	Guitars, Couches, Etc., Etc. - EP	"Drinkin' Problem - Acoustic"	Shane McAnally, Mark Wystrach, Cameron Duddy, Jess Carson
2020	Midland	Guitars, Couches, Etc., Etc. - EP	"Cheatin' Songs - Acoustic"	Shane McAnally, Mark Wystrach, Cameron Duddy, Jess Carson
2020	Midland	Guitars, Couches, Etc., Etc. - EP	"Burn Out - Acoustic"	Shane McAnally, Mark Wystrach, Cameron Duddy, Jess Carson
2020	Grayson Michael	—N/a	"When It Rains"	Shane McAnally, Trevor Rosen, LeAnn Phelan
2020	Gabby Barrett	Goldmine	"Write It On My Heart"	Ross Copperman, Gabby Barrett
2020	Rascal Flatts	Single	"How They Remember You"	Marc Beeson, Allen Shamblin
2020	Brandon Lay	—N/a	"Crazy Like You"	Shane McAnally, Brandon Lay
2020	Blake Shelton, Gwen Stefani	Single	"Happy Anywhere"	Matt Jenkins, Ross Copperman
2020	Darius Rucker	Single	"Beers And Sunshine"	Ross Copperman, J.T. Harding, Darius Rucker
2020	Morgan Wallen	—N/a	"7 Summers"	Shane McAnally, Morgan Wallen
2020	Carly Pearce	Single	"Next Girl"	Shane McAnally, Carly Pearce
2020	Danielle Bradbery	—N/a	"Girls In My Hometown"	Nicolle Galyon, Emily Weisband
2020	Jeremy McComb	—N/a	"Cotton's Gettin' High"	Shane McAnally, Luke Laird
2020	Jon Pardi	Heartache Medication (Deluxe)	"Bar Downtown"	Josh Thompson, Matt Dragstrem
2020	Manny Blu	New Ink	"Sink"	Matt Jenkins, Ryan Tyndell
2020	Manny Blu	New Ink	"Born To Ride"	Rhett Akins, Ross Copperman
2020	Manny Blu	New Ink	"Burnout Town"	Chris DeStefano, J.T. Harding
2020	Roman Alexander	Between You & Me - EP	"Girl Trouble"	Trevor Rosen, Jesse Frasure
2021
2021	Morgan Wallen	Dangerous: The Double Album	"Sand In My Boots"	Ashley Gorley, Michael Hardy
2021	Morgan Wallen	Dangerous: The Double Album	"7 Summers"	Shane McAnally, Morgan Wallen
2021	BEXAR	—N/a	"One Day"	Ross Copperman, Chris Ryan, Logan Turner
2021	Luke Bryan	—N/a	"Country Does"	Shane McAnally, Ross Copperman
2021	Carly Pearce	29	"Next Girl"	Shane McAnally, Carly Pearce
2021	Carly Pearce	29	"29"	Shane McAnally, Carly Pearce
2021	Carly Pearce	29	"Liability"	Shane McAnally, Carly Pearce
2021	Carly Pearce	29	"Day One"	Shane McAnally, Matthew Ramsey, Carly Pearce
2021	Darius Rucker	Single	"My Masterpiece"	J.T. Harding, Ross Copperman, Darius Rucker
2021	Ross Copperman	—N/a	"Somewhere There's A Light On"	Shane McAnally, Ross Copperman
2021	Kenny Chesney	Here And Now (Deluxe Album)	"Fields Of Glory"	Ross Copperman, Ashley Gorley
2021	Kenny Chesney	Here And Now (Deluxe Album)	"My Anthem"	Shane McAnally, Jason Gantt
2021	Blake Shelton	Body Language	"Happy Anywhere"	Ross Copperman, Matt Jenkins
2021	Blake Shelton	Body Language	"Makin' It Up As You Go"	Shane McAnally, Brad Tursi
2021	Blake Shelton	Body Language	"The Girl Can't Help It"	Ben Hayslip, Mark Holman
2021	Blake Shelton	Body Language	"The Flow"	Shane McAnally, Ross Copperman
2021	Old Dominion	Single	"I Was On A Boat That Day"	Shane McAnally, Matthew Ramsey, Trevor Rosen, Brad Tursi, William Sellers, George Sprung Jr.
2021	Tigirlily	Tigirlily EP	"Dig Yourself"	Shane McAnally, Trevor Rosen, Kendra Slaubaugh, Krista Slaubaugh
2021	Midland	The Last Resort EP	"And Then Some"	Shane McAnally, Mark Wystrach, Cameron Duddy, Jess Carson
2021	Midland	The Last Resort EP	"Two To Two Step"	Shane McAnally, Mark Wystrach, Cameron Duddy, Jess Carson
2021	Midland	The Last Resort EP	"Take Her Off Your Hands"	Shane McAnally, Mark Wystrach, Cameron Duddy, Jess Carson
2021	Ryan Kinder	Room To Dream	"Jane"	Ross Copperman, Ryan Kinder
2021	Luke Bryan	—N/a	"Songs You Never Heard"	Luke Laird, Luke Bryan
2021	Old Dominion	—N/a	"All I Know About Girls"	Shane McAnally, Matthew Ramsey, Trevor Rosen, Brad Tursi, George Sprung Jr., William Sellers
2021	Sam Hunt	Single	"23"	Shane McAnally, Sam Hunt, Chris LaCorte
2021	Carly Pearce	29: Written In Stone	"Next Girl"	Shane McAnally, Carly Pearce
2021	Carly Pearce	29: Written In Stone	"29"	Shane McAnally, Carly Pearce
2021	Carly Pearce	29: Written In Stone	"Liability"	Shane McAnally, Carly Pearce
2021	Carly Pearce	29: Written In Stone	"Day One"	Shane McAnally, Carly Pearce, Matthew Ramsey
2021	Old Dominion	Time, Tequila & Therapy	"Hawaii"	Shane McAnally, Matthew Ramsey, Trevor Rosen, Brad Tursi, George Sprung Jr., William Sellers
2021	Old Dominion	Time, Tequila & Therapy	"Walk On Whiskey"	Shane McAnally, Matthew Ramsey, Trevor Rosen, Brad Tursi, George Sprung Jr., William Sellers
2021	Old Dominion	Time, Tequila & Therapy	"All I Know About Girls"	Shane McAnally, Matthew Ramsey, Trevor Rosen, Brad Tursi, George Sprung Jr., William Sellers
2021	Old Dominion	Time, Tequila & Therapy	"Lonely Side Of Town"	Shane McAnally, Matthew Ramsey, Trevor Rosen, Brad Tursi, George Sprung Jr., William Sellers
2021	Old Dominion	Time, Tequila & Therapy	"I Was On A Boat That Day"	Shane McAnally, Matthew Ramsey, Trevor Rosen, Brad Tursi, George Sprung Jr., William Sellers
2021	Old Dominion	Time, Tequila & Therapy	"Drinking My Feelings"	Shane McAnally, Matthew Ramsey, Trevor Rosen, Brad Tursi, George Sprung Jr., William Sellers
2021	Old Dominion	Time, Tequila & Therapy	"Something's The Same About You"	Shane McAnally, Matthew Ramsey, Trevor Rosen, Brad Tursi, George Sprung Jr., William Sellers
2021	Old Dominion	Time, Tequila & Therapy	"Ain't Nothing Wrong With Love"	Shane McAnally, Matthew Ramsey, Trevor Rosen, Brad Tursi, George Sprung Jr., William Sellers
2021	Jackson Michelson	Back To That Summer EP	"Call Me No One"	Jon Nite, Justin Ebach
2021	Josh Abbott Band	Christmas Was EP	"Christmas Was"	Shane McAnally, Trevor Rosen
2021	Josh Abbott Band	Christmas Was EP	"Santa Better Knock"	Shane McAnally, Scott Stepakoff
2022	Chayce Beckham	Doin' It Right	"Love To Burn"	Ross Copperman, Chayce Beckham
2022	Andrew Hyatt	Four Good Years	"God's Green Earth"	Matt Jenkins, Ross Copperman
2022	Midland	The Last Resort: Greetings From	"The Last Resort"	Shane McAnally, Cameron Duddy, Mark Wystrach, Jess Carson
2022	Midland	The Last Resort: Greetings From	"If I Lived Here"	Shane McAnally, Cameron Duddy, Mark Wystrach, Jess Carson
2022	Midland	The Last Resort: Greetings From	"Two To Two Step"	Shane McAnally, Cameron Duddy, Mark Wystrach, Jess Carson
2022	Midland	The Last Resort: Greetings From	"Take Her Off Your Hands"	Shane McAnally, Cameron Duddy, Mark Wystrach, Jess Carson
2022	Midland	The Last Resort: Greetings From	"And Then Some"	Shane McAnally, Cameron Duddy, Mark Wystrach, Jess Carson
2022	Midland	The Last Resort: Greetings From	"Bury Me In Blue Jeans"	Shane McAnally, Thomas Rhett, Cameron Duddy, Mark Wystrach, Jess Carson
2022	Elle King feat. Dierks Bentley	—N/a	"Worth A Shot"	Shane McAnally, Ross Copperman
2022	Drew Parker	—N/a	"Little Miss Saturday Night"	Andrew DeRoberts, Matt Jenkins
2022	Alexander Ludwig	—N/a	"Faded On Me"	Ross Copperman, Jon Nite
2022	Eli Young Band	Love Talking	"Live With It"	Daniel Ross, Mike Eli
2022	Kameron Marlowe	—N/a	"Girl On Fire"	Jason Gantt, Kameron Marlowe
2022	Sam Hunt	—N/a	"Water Under The Bridge"	Shane McAnally, Sam Hunt, Chris LaCorte
2022	Nicolle Galyon	tendencies.	"winner."	Shane McAnally, Nicolle Galyon
2022	Nicolle Galyon	tendencies.	"tendencies."	Shane McAnally, Nicolle Galyon, Cooper Galyon
2022	Kat & Alex	—N/a	"We Bought A House"	Kat Luna, Alex Georgia, Lindsay Rimes
2022	Tim Hicks	Talk to Time	"Talk to Time"	Shane McAnally, Ross Copperman
2022	Little Big Town	Mr. Sun	"Whiskey Colored Eyes"	Shane McAnally, Karen Fairchild, Jimi Westbrook, Phillip Sweet, Kimberly Schlapman
2022	Madeline Merlo	Slide	"YOUNG-ish"	Jerry Flowers, Madeline Merlo, Zach Crowell
2022	Kelsea Ballerini	SUBJECT TO CHANGE	"I CAN'T HELP MYSELF"	Shane McAnally, Julian Bunetta, Kelsea Ballerini
