= Break Up in a Small Town =

Single by Sam Hunt

from the album Montevallo
- Released: September 21, 2015
- Recorded: 2014
- Genre: Country; R&B
- Length: 3:51
- Label: MCA Nashville
- Songwriters: Sam Hunt; Zach Crowell; Shane McAnally
- Producers: Zach Crowell; Shane McAnally

Sam Hunt singles chronology
"House Party" (2015)	"Break Up in a Small Town" (2015)	"Make You Miss Me" (2016)

Music video
- "Break Up in a Small Town" on YouTube

Alternative cover
- Acoustic single cover

"Break Up in a Small Town" is a song co-written and recorded by American country music singer Sam Hunt. It was released to country radio, by MCA Nashville on September 21, 2015, as the fourth single from his debut studio album Montevallo (2014). The song was written by Hunt, Zach Crowell and Shane McAnally.

== Background and composition ==
The song has country and R&B influence, which Hunt expressed in an article with Billboard. Shane McAnally said of the influence: "It's a model that I think many people could learn from because you are still evolving as an artist along the way. Just because you put music out, it doesn't mean that is where you stop for the next year". Hunt then discussed the process of making the song, saying it was born when he was "singing that chorus melody late one night while riding around trying to come up with song ideas". He originally "didn't want to write anymore break up songs", but the melody of the song changed his mind, saying it "fit too perfectly not to go with it". The song was inspired by his breakup with his then-girlfriend Hannah Lee Fowler whom he has since married.

== Critical reception ==
Billy Dukes of Taste of Country gave the song a favorable review and observed the song as "likely the wordiest song of 2015" and Hunt's "most genre-bending release to country radio", adding "Any talk of which genre Hunt belongs in misses the point. His story hits hard. It's deep and emotional and sincere and all the things we expect from a great country song".

== Music video ==
The music video was directed by Tim Mattia and premiered in October 2015. The video was shot in Macon County, Tennessee.

== Commercial performance ==
The song debuted on the Hot Country Songs chart at number 30 for the week of August 30, 2014, the week his EP X2C was released, with 24,000 copies sold. All four songs from the EP debuted on the chart, with "Ex to See", "House Party", and "Break Up in a Small Town" doing so exclusively through digital sales. It also debuted at number 16 on the Country Digital Songs chart. Following its release as a single from Montevallo, the song peaked at number two on the Hot Country Songs chart, but was kept out of the top spot by "Die a Happy Man" performed by Thomas Rhett. The song became Hunt's fourth consecutive top-three hit on the Hot Country Songs chart. The song was certified Gold by the RIAA on September 3, 2015, and Platinum on December 17, 2015. As of March 2016, the song has sold nearly 1,230,000 downloads.

== Charts ==
=== Weekly charts ===
Chart (2015–2016)	Peak position
Canada Hot 100 (Billboard)	43
Canada Country (Billboard)	3
US Billboard Hot 100	29
US Country Airplay (Billboard)	2
US Hot Country Songs (Billboard)	2

=== Year-end charts ===
Chart (2015)	Position
US Country Airplay (Billboard)	94
US Hot Country Songs (Billboard)	64
Chart (2016)	Position
US Country Airplay (Billboard)	46
US Hot Country Songs (Billboard)	7

== Certifications and sales ==
Region	Certification	Certified units/sales
Canada (Music Canada)	5× Platinum	400,000^{‡}
New Zealand (RMNZ)	Gold	15,000^{‡}
United States (RIAA)	6× Platinum	6,000,000^{‡}
^{‡} Sales+streaming figures based on certification alone.
