= Raised on It =

Promotional single by Sam Hunt
- Released: September 3, 2013
- Recorded: 2013
- Genre: Country pop
- Length: 3:55
- Label: Combustion
- Songwriters: Sam Hunt; Zach Crowell; Jerry Flowers
- Producers: Zach Crowell; Shane McAnally

Sam Hunt singles chronology
"Raised on It" (2013)	"Leave the Night On" (2014)

Music video
- "Raised on It" on YouTube

"Raised on It" is a song co-written and recorded by American country music singer Sam Hunt. It was released independently, and was later included on his debut studio album Montevallo (2014).

== Critical reception ==
Matt Bjorke of Roughstock reviewed the single favorably, saying that "The song may mentioned trucks and parties but it's more about the roots and youthful lifestyle than trying to have a girl slide over on a bench seat or to get so washed out in party land that nothing else can be taken from the lyrics".

== Music video ==
The music video premiered in August 2013 on Hunt's independent YouTube channel. The music video features Hunt heading to Georgia to hang out with friends and family.

== Chart performance ==
Chart (2014)	Peak position
US Hot Country Songs (Billboard)	49
Chart (2016)	Peak position
US Country Airplay (Billboard)	41

== Certifications ==
Certifications and sales for "Raised on It"
Region	Certification	Certified units/sales
Canada (Music Canada)	Platinum	80,000^{‡}
United States (RIAA)	Gold	500,000^{‡}
^{‡} Sales+streaming figures based on certification alone.
