= Body Like a Back Road =

Single by Sam Hunt

from the album Southside
- Released: February 2, 2017
- Recorded: 2017
- Genre: Country pop
- Length: 2:40
- Label: MCA Nashville
- Songwriters: Sam Hunt; Zach Crowell; Shane McAnally; Josh Osborne
- Producer: Zach Crowell

Sam Hunt singles chronology
"Make You Miss Me" (2016)	"Body Like a Back Road" (2017)	"Downtown's Dead" (2018)

Lyric video
- "Body Like a Back Road" on YouTube

"Body Like a Back Road" is a song co-written and recorded by American country music singer Sam Hunt. It was released to country radio, by MCA Nashville on February 2, 2017, as the lead single from his second studio album Southside. The song is written by Hunt, Zach Crowell, Shane McAnally and Josh Osborne. It was released to American adult pop radio on April 3, 2017, becoming his second crossover single promoted to a pop format.

Despite receiving mixed reviews, "Body Like a Back Road" became Hunt's most successful song to date. It broke two records within a month of one another; in early June 2017, the song was the longest running number one since Leroy Van Dyke's "Walk On By" 55 years earlier. With 20 weeks at number one on the Billboard Hot Country Songs chart – this made Hunt the solo country artist with the second longest run at the top of the 59-year old Hot Country Songs chart. (Hank Snow's, "I'm Moving On" spent 21 weeks). The song broke records again in late July 2017, becoming the only song in the history of the Hot Country Songs chart to stay at number one for more than 24 weeks, a record previously held since 2012 by Florida Georgia Line's "Cruise". The song spent a total of 34 weeks on top of the Hot Country Songs chart. Additionally, the song peaked at number six on the US Billboard Hot 100, becoming Hunt's highest-charting single, and his first top 10 single overall, on that chart. With this peak, the song became the highest-charting country song on the US Billboard Hot 100 since "Cruise" by Florida Georgia Line, which reached number four in 2013.

== Background ==
The song was written by Hunt with his producer Zach Crowell, Josh Osborne and Shane McAnally. According to Hunt, the song was written after his engagement to Hannah Lee Fowler. Hunt described it as "a lighthearted song" as he wanted to release something lighter than the "heavy direction" that his new album was taking. Hunt said: "I connect music to the emotions that come from relationships, so most of the songs that I write are inspired by those circumstances, emotions, feelings, all that kind of stuff". He had previously broken up with Fowler, and wrote "Drinkin' Too Much" as an apology (the break-up also inspired a few other songs in Montevallo). The couple got back together, and a few days after "Drinkin' Too Much" was released in January 2017, he announced their engagement.

== Composition ==
The song is composed in the key of F major with a tempo of 96–100 beats per minute.

== Commercial performance ==
In the US, the song reached number one on the Billboard Hot Country Songs chart and remained there for 34 consecutive weeks until it was knocked off by "What Ifs" performed by Kane Brown and Lauren Alaina, breaking the record set by "Cruise" by Florida Georgia Line for the most weeks atop the chart (24 weeks). The record was later broken by Bebe Rexha and Florida Georgia Line's collaboration "Meant to Be" which stayed atop the chart for 50 consecutive weeks. It is Hunt's longest chart-topping single, overtaking "Take Your Time", which stayed on top of the Hot Country Songs chart for 11 weeks.

"Body Like a Back Road" also reached number one on the Country Airplay chart and stayed at that spot for three consecutive weeks. On the week after Hunt's performance at the ACM Awards, the song sold 70,000 copies and jumped up six places from number 12 to number six on the US Billboard Hot 100, becoming Hunt's highest-charting single, and his first top 10 single overall, on that chart. With this peak, the song became the highest-charting country song on the US Billboard Hot 100 since "Cruise" by Florida Georgia Line, which reached number four in 2013. The song also crossed over to pop radio.

The song was certified Diamond on July 28, 2023. It was the third best-selling song in the US in 2017, and the best-selling country song, with 1,818,000 copies (3,723,000 units including streams) sold in the year. It has sold 1,951,000 copies in the United States as of June 2018.

== Critical reception ==
Despite huge commercial success, "Body Like a Back Road" was met with overwhelmingly mixed-to-negative reviews. It has been in the midst of controversy and being called out by some reporters and neo-traditional country artists for lack of similarity to country music's "roots". Many also took issue with the comparison between a woman's body and a back road. Multiple critics have cited "Body Like a Back Road" as one of the worst songs of 2017.

== Charts ==
=== Weekly charts ===
Chart (2017–2018)	Peak position
Australia (ARIA)	9
Canada Hot 100 (Billboard)	16
Canada AC (Billboard)	33
Canada CHR/Top 40 (Billboard)	37
Canada Country (Billboard)	1
Canada Hot AC (Billboard)	35
Czech Republic Singles Digital (ČNS IFPI)	77
New Zealand (Recorded Music NZ)	24
Slovakia Singles Digital (ČNS IFPI)	73
US Billboard Hot 100	6
US Adult Contemporary (Billboard)	15
US Adult Pop Airplay (Billboard)	6
US Country Airplay (Billboard)	1
US Hot Country Songs (Billboard)	1
US Pop Airplay (Billboard)	11

=== Year-end charts ===
Chart (2017)	Position
Australia (ARIA)	27
Canada (Canadian Hot 100)	21
Canada Country (Billboard)	1
US Billboard Hot 100	8
US Adult Contemporary (Billboard)	36
US Adult Top 40 (Billboard)	24
US Country Airplay (Billboard)	1
US Hot Country Songs (Billboard)	1
US Mainstream Top 40 (Billboard)	43

Chart (2018)	Position
US Hot Country Songs (Billboard)	46

=== Decade-end charts ===
Chart (2010–2019)	Position
US Hot Country Songs (Billboard)	2

== Certifications ==
Region	Certification	Certified units/sales
Australia (ARIA)	6× Platinum	420,000^{‡}
Canada (Music Canada)	Diamond	800,000^{‡}
New Zealand (RMNZ)	5× Platinum	150,000^{‡}
United Kingdom (BPI)	Gold	400,000^{‡}
United States (RIAA)	11× Platinum	11,000,000^{‡}
^{‡} Sales+streaming figures based on certification alone.
