= Downtown's Dead =

Single by Sam Hunt

from the album Southside
- Released: May 16, 2018
- Genre: Country
- Length: 3:35
- Label: MCA Nashville
- Songwriter(s): Sam Hunt; Zach Crowell; Josh Osborne; Shane McAnally; Charlie Handsome
- Producer(s): Zach Crowell; Charlie Handsome

Sam Hunt singles chronology
"Body Like a Back Road" (2017)	"Downtown's Dead" (2018)	"Kinfolks" (2019)

Music video
- "Downtown's Dead" on YouTube

"Downtown's Dead" is a song co-written and recorded by American country music singer Sam Hunt. It is Hunt's eighth single release, and the follow-up to his 2017 hit "Body Like a Back Road" as well as the second single from his second studio album Southside. The song, which he wrote with Zach Crowell, Shane McAnally, Josh Osborne, and Charlie Handsome, is about the loneliness felt after a break-up. The song is Hunt's lowest charting single of his career, with a peak at number 15 on the Country Airplay chart.

== Content and history ==
Co-writer Zach Crowell told Taste of Country that "It was an idea that Sam brought and we chipped away at over the course of a handful of different writes". The two then presented the idea of "Downtown's Dead" to Shane McAnally and Josh Osborne, who experimented with different sounds before deciding to make the lead instrument an acoustic guitar. The lyrics take inspiration from a breakup that Hunt had with his wife, Hannah, and it expresses the loneliness that the narrator feels when by himself in a public setting. The song was described by Rolling Stone as featuring a "woozy Latin guitar riff" and a "hungover narrative about a city that no longer holds the same charm it once did". Hunt announced the single's release via Instagram in May 2018.

== Charts ==
=== Weekly charts ===
Chart (2018)	Peak position
Canada (Canadian Hot 100)	67
Canada Country (Billboard)	22
US Billboard Hot 100	94
US Country Airplay (Billboard)	15
US Hot Country Songs (Billboard)	14

=== Year-end charts ===
Chart (2018)	Position
US Hot Country Songs (Billboard)	72

== Certifications ==
Region	Certification	Certified units/sales
Canada (Music Canada)	Platinum	80,000^{‡}
United States (RIAA)	Gold	500,000^{‡}
^{‡} Sales+streaming figures based on certification alone.
