= Make You Miss Me =

Single by Sam Hunt

from the album Montevallo
- Released: March 7, 2016
- Recorded: 2014
- Genre: Country
- Length: 3:45
- Label: MCA Nashville
- Songwriters: Sam Hunt; Josh Osborne; Matthew Ramsey
- Producers: Zach Crowell; Shane McAnally

Sam Hunt singles chronology
"Break Up in a Small Town" (2015)	"Make You Miss Me" (2016)	"Body Like a Back Road" (2017)

Audio video
- "Make You Miss Me" on YouTube

"Make You Miss Me" is a song co-written and recorded by American country music singer Sam Hunt. It was released to country radio, by MCA Nashville on March 7, 2016 as the fifth single from his debut studio album Montevallo (2014). The song is written by Hunt, Matthew Ramsey and Josh Osborne.

"Make You Miss Me" reached number one on the Billboard Country Airplay chart, becoming Hunt's fourth number one and making him the first male solo artist to land four number ones on that chart from a debut studio album. It also peaked at number two on the Hot Country Songs chart and number 45 on the US Billboard Hot 100. It has sold 659,000 units in the US as of October 2016. The song achieved similar chart success in Canada, peaking at number two on the Canada Country chart and number 67 on the Canadian Hot 100.

== Commercial performance ==
The song first entered the Billboard Hot Country Songs chart at number 32 when it became available for download on the release of his debut studio album Montevallo in October 2014. It also debuted the same week at number seven on the Country Digital Songs chart, selling 21,000 copies. It entered the Country Airplay chart at number 58 for the week of March 12, 2016 on its release as a single. The song has since reached number two on the Hot Country Songs chart and number one on the Country Airplay chart, making Hunt the first solo male artist to pull four Country Airplay number one hits from a debut studio album.

As of April 2017, the song has sold 708,000 copies in the US.

== Charts ==
=== Weekly charts ===
Chart (2016)	Peak position
Canada Hot 100 (Billboard)	67
Canada Country (Billboard)	2
US Billboard Hot 100	45
US Country Airplay (Billboard)	1
US Hot Country Songs (Billboard)	2

=== Year-end charts ===
Chart (2016)	Position
US Country Airplay (Billboard)	15
US Hot Country Songs (Billboard)	26

== Certifications ==
Region	Certification	Certified units/sales
Canada (Music Canada)	3× Platinum	240,000^{‡}
United States (RIAA)	3× Platinum	3,000,000^{‡}
^{‡} Sales+streaming figures based on certification alone.
