= List of Billboard number-one country songs of 2015 =

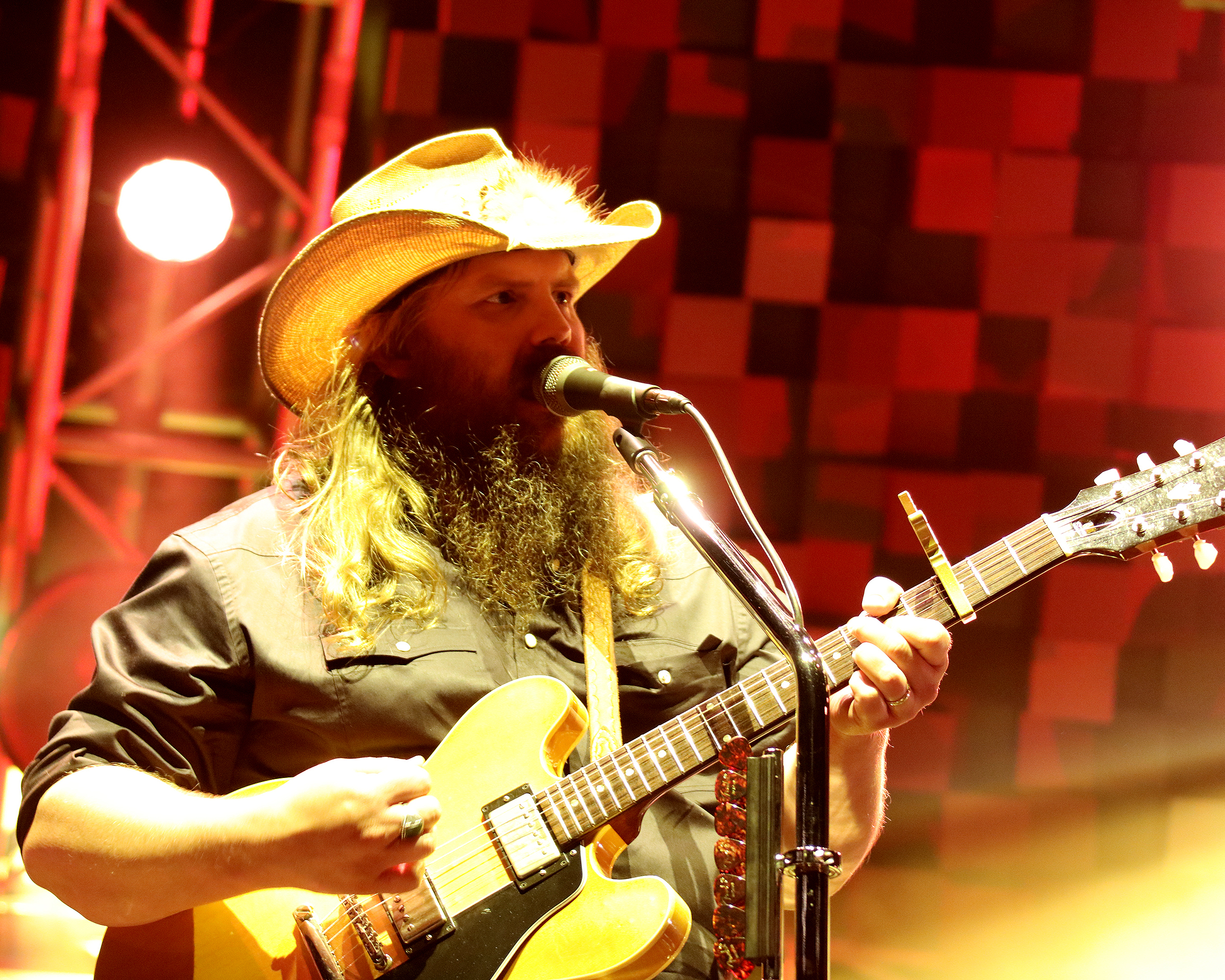
Chris Stapleton's "Tennessee Whiskey" went straight to number one after an acclaimed awards show performance.

Hot Country Songs and Country Airplay are charts that rank the top-performing country music songs in the United States, published by Billboard magazine. Hot Country Songs ranks songs based on digital downloads, streaming, and airplay, not only from country stations but from stations of all formats, a methodology introduced in 2012. Country Airplay, which was published for the first time in 2012, is based solely on country radio airplay, a methodology which had previously been used for several decades for Hot Country Songs. In 2015, 10 different songs topped the Hot Country Songs chart and 39 different songs topped Country Airplay in 52 issues of the magazine.

In the first issue of Billboard of the year, Craig Wayne Boyd entered the Hot Country Songs chart at number one with "My Baby's Got a Smile on Her Face". Boyd, winner of the seventh season of NBC's reality TV singing competition The Voice, was only the second artist in the chart's 57-year history to enter at number one. The following week, however, the song dropped off the chart completely, meaning that its entire chart run consisted of a single week at number one. In addition to Boyd, one other artist was a first-time chart-topper on Hot Country Songs. Following a critically acclaimed performance at the 49th Country Music Association Awards, Chris Stapleton's version of "Tennessee Whiskey", which had spent a single week at number 46 six months earlier, re-entered at number one, despite never having been officially released as a single or serviced to radio. Nine acts gained their first career country number ones by topping the airplay listing. Ashley Monroe made her first appearance at number one under her own name when she featured on Blake Shelton's hit "Lonely Tonight", although she had previously reached the top spot as part of the group Pistol Annies, who had been featured on another of Shelton's songs two years earlier. Between May and August, Tyler Farr, Kelsea Ballerini, Canaan Smith, Michael Ray, and the band A Thousand Horses were all first-time chart-toppers, as was Grace Potter, who was featured on veteran country star Kenny Chesney's song "Wild Child". Later in the year, the band Old Dominion and the duo Dan + Shay made their first appearances at number one.

The group Little Big Town had the longest unbroken run at number one on Hot Country Songs, spending 13 consecutive weeks in the top spot with "Girl Crush" during the summer. Sam Hunt had the highest total number of weeks at number one, spending a total of 17 weeks atop the chart with "Take Your Time" and "House Party". Hunt was one of two acts with more than one chart-topper on the hybrid listing, along with Luke Bryan, who reached number one with "I See You", "Kick the Dust Up" and "Strip It Down". On the Country Airplay listing, songs had much shorter runs at number one; no song spent more than three consecutive weeks in the top spot, a feat achieved by three songs during the year: "Homegrown" by the Zac Brown Band, "Save It for a Rainy Day" by Kenny Chesney and "I'm Comin' Over" by Chris Young. Chesney and Bryan tied for the most total weeks at number one, each spending five weeks in total atop the chart. The two singers also tied with Blake Shelton for the highest number of individual number ones, each taking three songs to the top spot during 2015. At the end of the year, Shelton was at number one on the airplay chart with "Gonna" and Thomas Rhett held the top position on Hot Country Songs with "Die a Happy Man", which would ultimately spend a total of 17 weeks at number one.

== Chart history ==
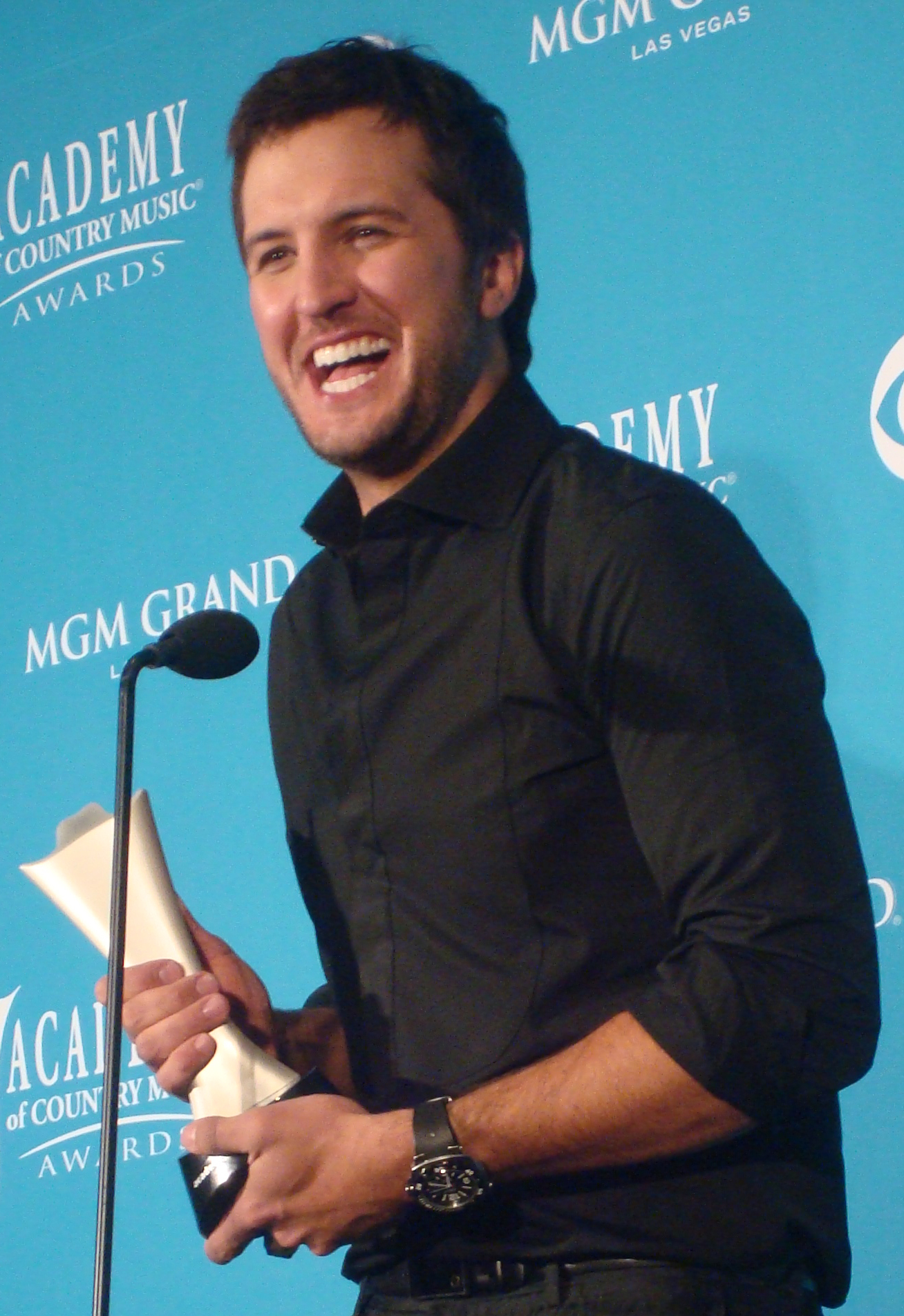
Luke Bryan spent the most weeks at number one on the Hot Country Songs chart.

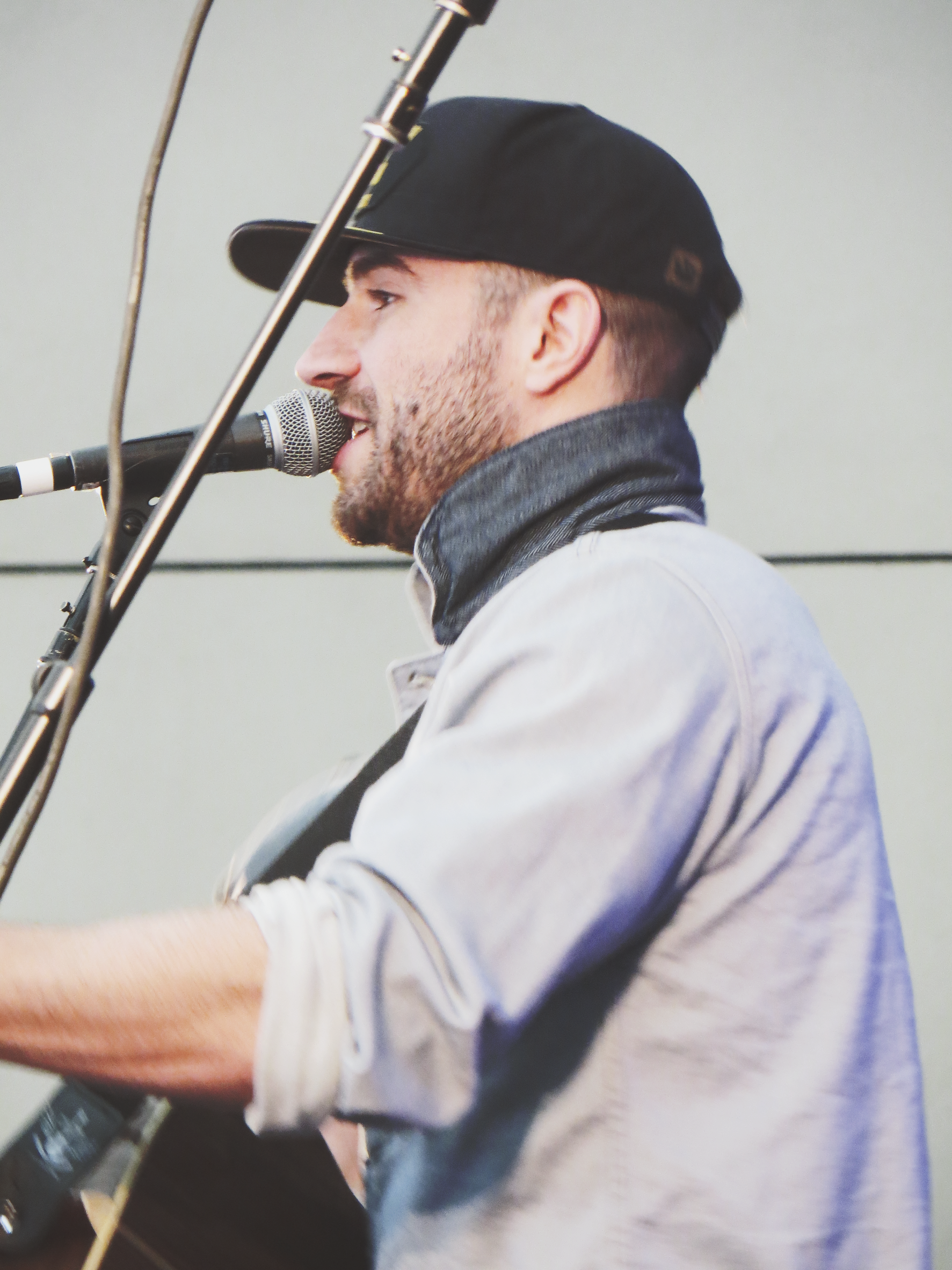
Sam Hunt topped both charts with both "Take Your Time" and "House Party".

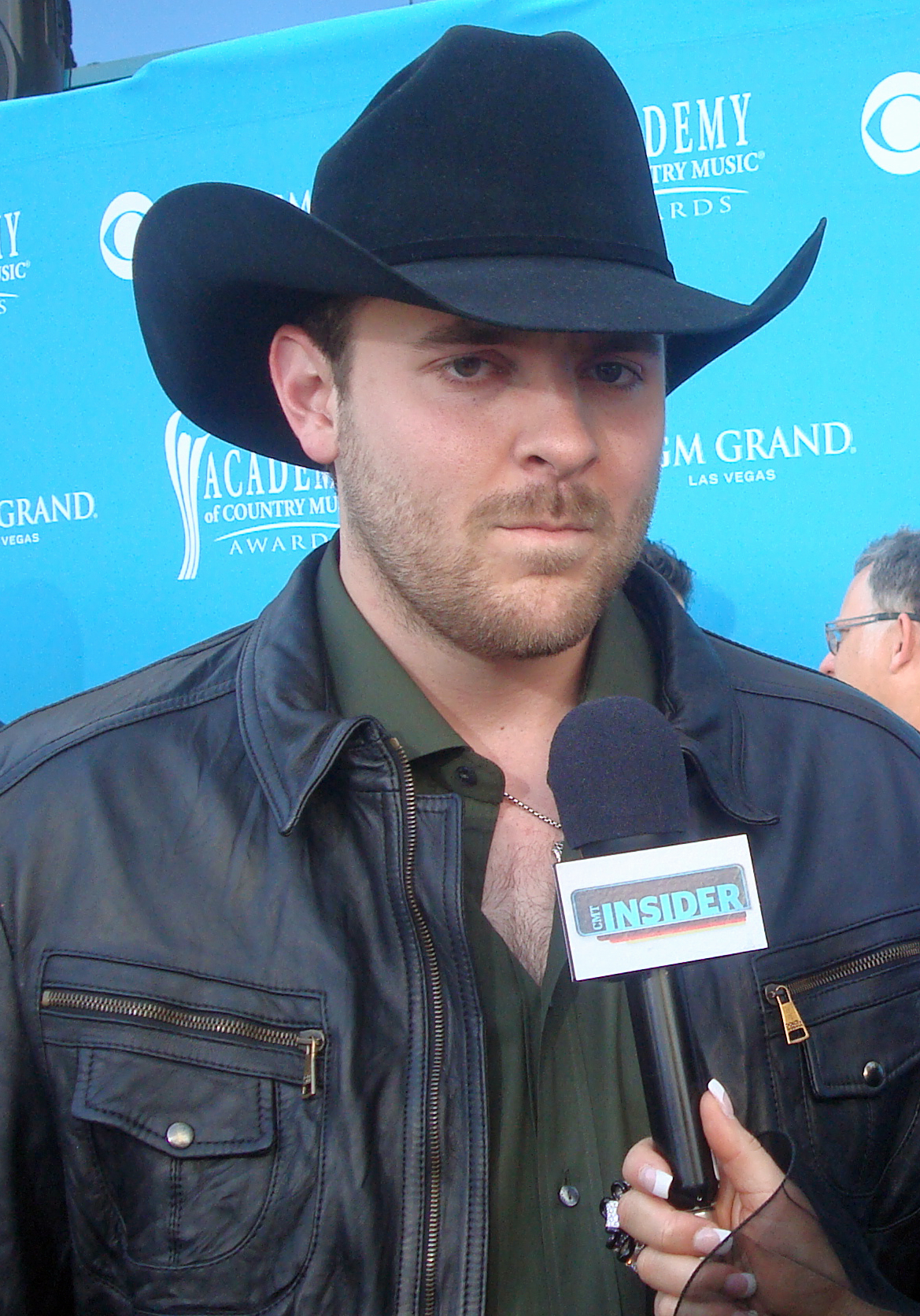
Chris Young spent three weeks at number one on Country Airplay with "I'm Comin' Over", his first chart-topper since "You" in February 2012.

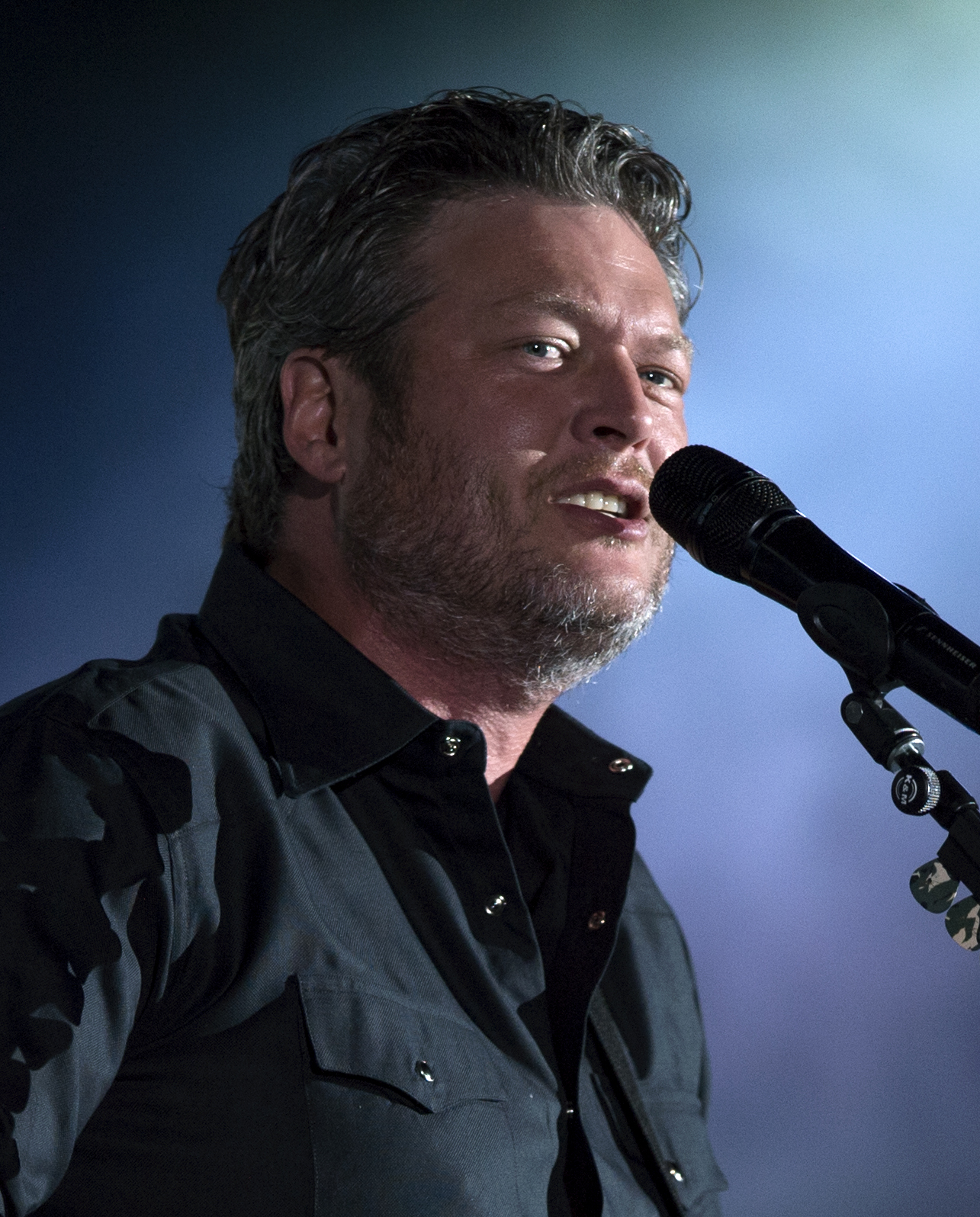
Blake Shelton had three number ones on the Airplay chart during the year.

Key
†	Indicates number one on Billboard's year-end Hot Country Songs chart. "Drinking Class" by Lee Brice topped the year-end Country Airplay chart, although it never reached number one on the weekly listing.

Chart history
Issue date	Hot Country Songs	Artist(s)	Ref.	Country Airplay	Artist(s)	Ref.
January 3	"My Baby's Got a Smile on Her Face"	Craig Wayne Boyd		"Shotgun Rider"	Tim McGraw	
January 10	"Something in the Water"	Carrie Underwood		"Shotgun Rider"	Tim McGraw	
January 17	"Something in the Water"	Carrie Underwood		"Perfect Storm"	Brad Paisley	
January 24	"Something in the Water"	Carrie Underwood		"Perfect Storm"	Brad Paisley	
January 31	"Something in the Water"	Carrie Underwood		"Til It's Gone"	Kenny Chesney	
February 7	"I See You"	Luke Bryan		"Talladega"	Eric Church	
February 14	"I See You"	Luke Bryan		"I See You"	Luke Bryan	
February 21	"Take Your Time" †	Sam Hunt		"I See You"	Luke Bryan	
February 28	"Take Your Time" †	Sam Hunt		"Sun Daze"	Florida Georgia Line	
March 7	"Take Your Time" †	Sam Hunt		"Make Me Wanna"	Thomas Rhett	
March 14	"Take Your Time" †	Sam Hunt		"Lonely Tonight"	Blake Shelton featuring Ashley Monroe	
March 21	"Take Your Time" †	Sam Hunt		"Just Gettin' Started"	Jason Aldean	
March 28	"Take Your Time" †	Sam Hunt		"Mean to Me"	Brett Eldredge	
April 4	"Take Your Time" †	Sam Hunt		"Ain't Worth the Whiskey"	Cole Swindell	
April 11	"Take Your Time" †	Sam Hunt		"Homegrown"	Zac Brown Band	
April 18	"Take Your Time" †	Sam Hunt		"Homegrown"	Zac Brown Band	
April 25	"Take Your Time" †	Sam Hunt		"Homegrown"	Zac Brown Band	
May 2	"Take Your Time" †	Sam Hunt		"Take Your Time"	Sam Hunt	
May 9	"Girl Crush"	Little Big Town		"Say You Do"	Dierks Bentley	
May 16	"Girl Crush"	Little Big Town		"Say You Do"	Dierks Bentley	
May 23	"Girl Crush"	Little Big Town		"Raise 'Em Up"	Keith Urban featuring Eric Church	
May 30	"Girl Crush"	Little Big Town		"A Guy Walks Into a Bar"	Tyler Farr	
June 6	"Girl Crush"	Little Big Town		"Don't It"	Billy Currington	
June 13	"Girl Crush"	Little Big Town		"Smoke"	A Thousand Horses	
June 20	"Girl Crush"	Little Big Town		"Sippin' on Fire"	Florida Georgia Line	
June 27	"Girl Crush"	Little Big Town		"Wild Child"	Kenny Chesney featuring Grace Potter	
July 4	"Girl Crush"	Little Big Town		"Love Me Like You Mean It"	Kelsea Ballerini	
July 11	"Girl Crush"	Little Big Town		"Sangria"	Blake Shelton	
July 18	"Girl Crush"	Little Big Town		"Sangria"	Blake Shelton	
July 25	"Girl Crush"	Little Big Town		"Love You Like That"	Canaan Smith	
August 1	"Girl Crush"	Little Big Town		"Tonight Looks Good on You"	Jason Aldean	
August 8	"Kick the Dust Up"	Luke Bryan		"One Hell of an Amen"	Brantley Gilbert	
August 15	"Kick the Dust Up"	Luke Bryan		"Kick the Dust Up"	Luke Bryan	
August 22	"House Party"	Sam Hunt		"Kiss You in the Morning"	Michael Ray	
August 29	"House Party"	Sam Hunt		"Loving You Easy"	Zac Brown Band	
September 5	"House Party"	Sam Hunt		"Young & Crazy"	Frankie Ballard	
September 12	"House Party"	Sam Hunt		"House Party"	Sam Hunt	
September 19	"House Party"	Sam Hunt		"Hell of a Night"	Dustin Lynch	
September 26	"House Party"	Sam Hunt		"Crash and Burn"	Thomas Rhett	
October 3	"Strip It Down"	Luke Bryan		"Save It for a Rainy Day"	Kenny Chesney	
October 10	"Strip It Down"	Luke Bryan		"Save It for a Rainy Day"	Kenny Chesney	
October 17	"Strip It Down"	Luke Bryan		"Save It for a Rainy Day"	Kenny Chesney	
October 24	"Strip It Down"	Luke Bryan		"Lose My Mind"	Brett Eldredge	
October 31	"Strip It Down"	Luke Bryan		"Strip It Down"	Luke Bryan	
November 7	"Strip It Down"	Luke Bryan		"Strip It Down"	Luke Bryan	
November 14	"Die a Happy Man"	Thomas Rhett		"Break Up with Him"	Old Dominion	
November 21	"Tennessee Whiskey"	Chris Stapleton		"Break Up with Him"	Old Dominion	
November 28	"Tennessee Whiskey"	Chris Stapleton		"I'm Comin' Over"	Chris Young	
December 5	"Die a Happy Man"	Thomas Rhett		"I'm Comin' Over"	Chris Young	
December 12	"Die a Happy Man"	Thomas Rhett		"I'm Comin' Over"	Chris Young	
December 19	"Die a Happy Man"	Thomas Rhett		"Nothin' Like You"	Dan + Shay	
December 26	"Die a Happy Man"	Thomas Rhett		"Gonna"	Blake Shelton	

== See also ==
- 2015 in music
- List of artists who reached number one on the U.S. country chart
- List of number-one country albums of 2015 (U.S.)
- List of number-one country singles of 2015 (Canada)
