= List of Top Country Albums number ones of 2015 =

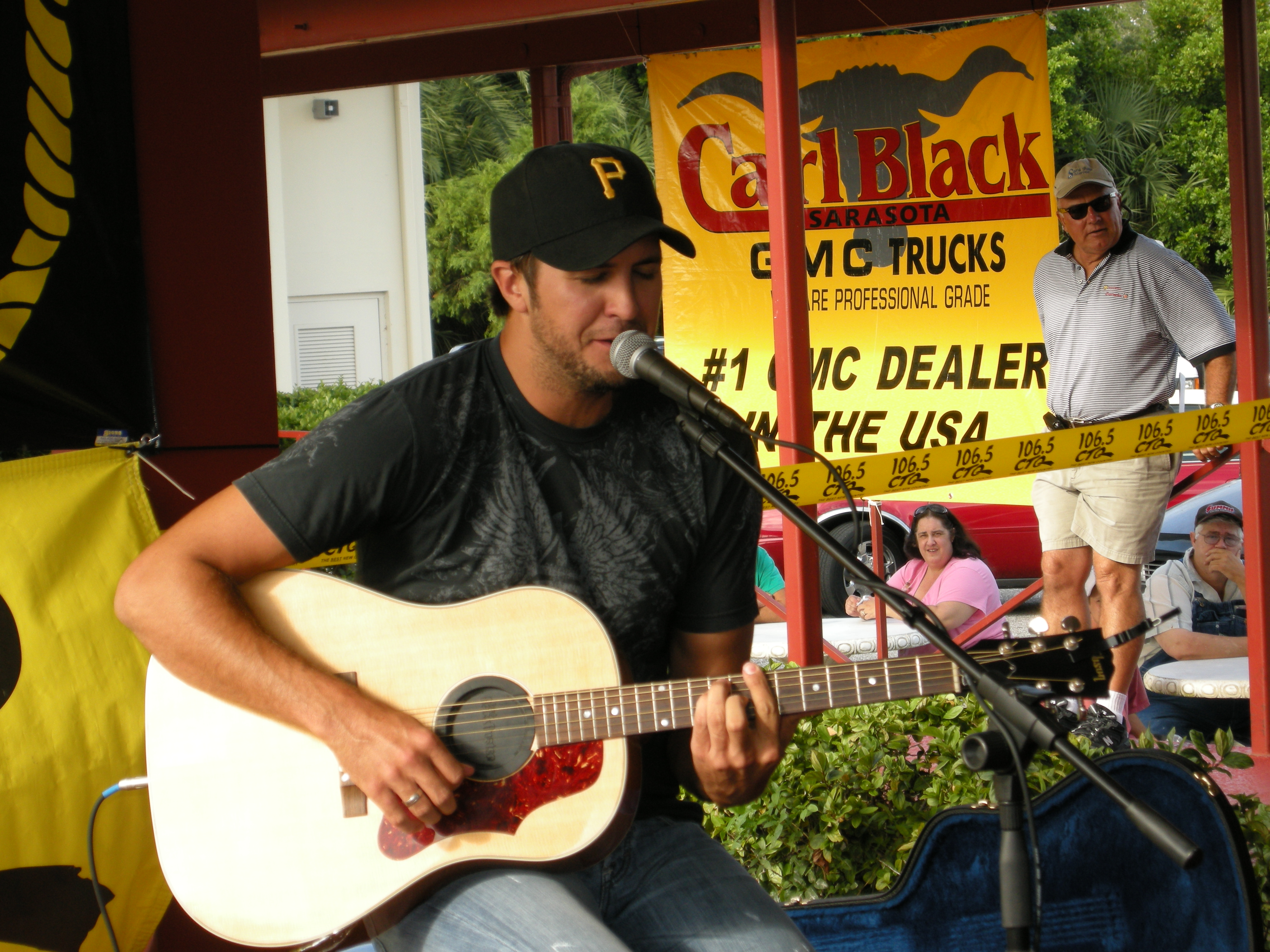
Luke Bryan had two number ones in 2015.

Top Country Albums is a chart that ranks the top-performing country music albums in the United States, published by Billboard. In 2015, 23 different albums topped the chart; placings were based on electronic point of sale data from retail outlets.

Luke Bryan was the only act to achieve more than one number one in 2015. In the spring he spent three weeks in the top spot with Spring Break...Checkin' Out, the last in a series of spring break-themed releases released by Bryan since 2009. It included five new tracks as well as the six tracks from the 2014 EP Spring Break 6...Like We Ain't Ever. Bryan returned to the top spot in August with the album Kill the Lights, which spent eight weeks atop the chart, tying for the most weeks spent at number one by an album with Montevallo, the debut album by Sam Hunt. Bryan's total of 11 weeks at number one was the most achieved by any act during the year and Kill the Lights had the longest unbroken run in the top spot of 2015 with its initial spell of five weeks in the peak position.

Several acts topped the chart for the first time in 2015, beginning with the band Blackberry Smoke in the issue of Billboard dated February 28. The following week Aaron Watson entered the chart at number one with The Underdog. It gave the singer his first chart-topper more than ten years after he released his debut album, and was the first self-released and independently distributed album by a male soloist to enter at number one in the chart's history. In July, Easton Corbin reached the top of the chart for the first time with About to Get Real, and the following month Something More Than Free was the first number one for Jason Isbell. In the fall, Brett Eldredge, Chris Stapleton and Chris Young made their first appearances in the top spot with Illinois, Traveller and I'm Comin' Over respectively. In contrast to the various acts topping the chart for the first time, George Strait gained his 26th number one with Cold Beer Conversation, and country music veterans Willie Nelson and Merle Haggard, both of whom had been achieving number ones for more than 40 years, spent a week in the top spot with the collaborative album Django and Jimmie; Haggard would die less than a year later, in April of the following year.

== Chart history ==
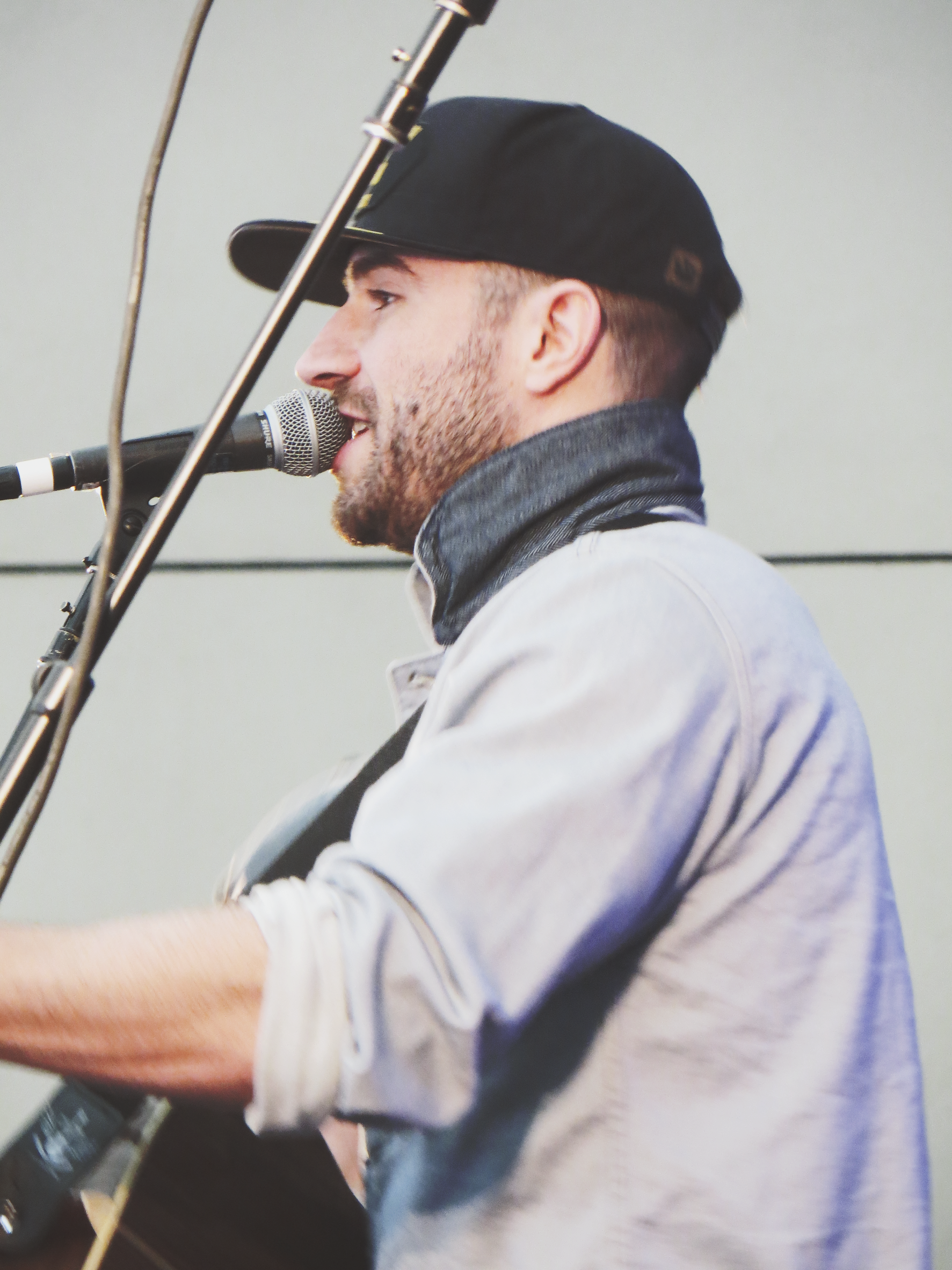
Sam Hunt spent eight weeks at number one with his debut album Montevallo.

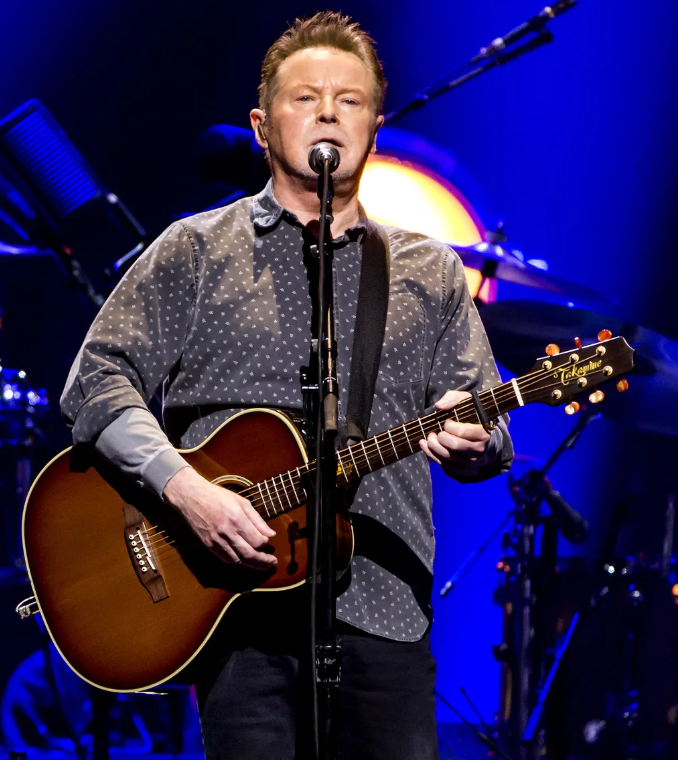
Don Henley of the Eagles topped the country chart with his first solo album since 2000.

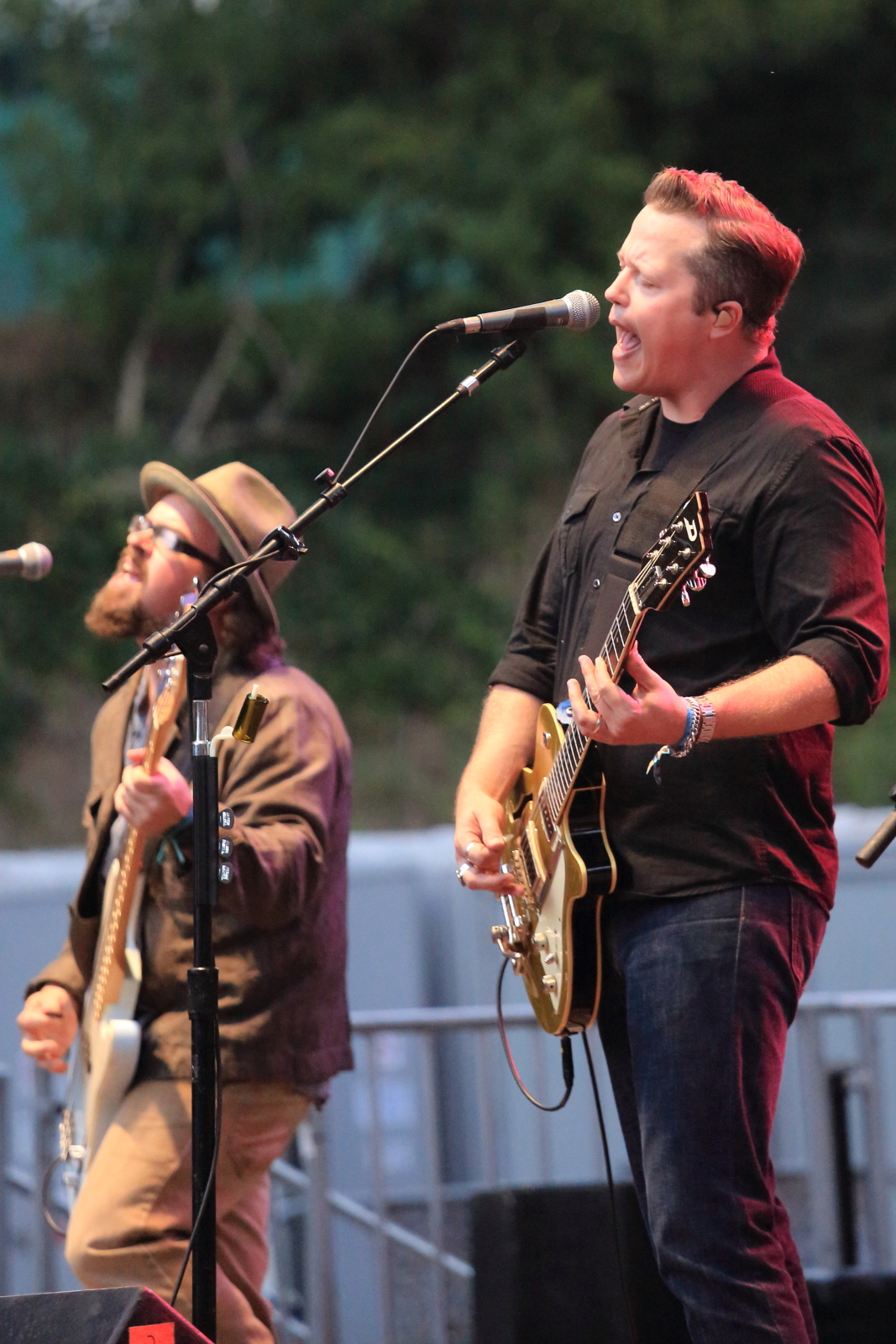
Jason Isbell (right) achieved his first number one with Something More Than Free.

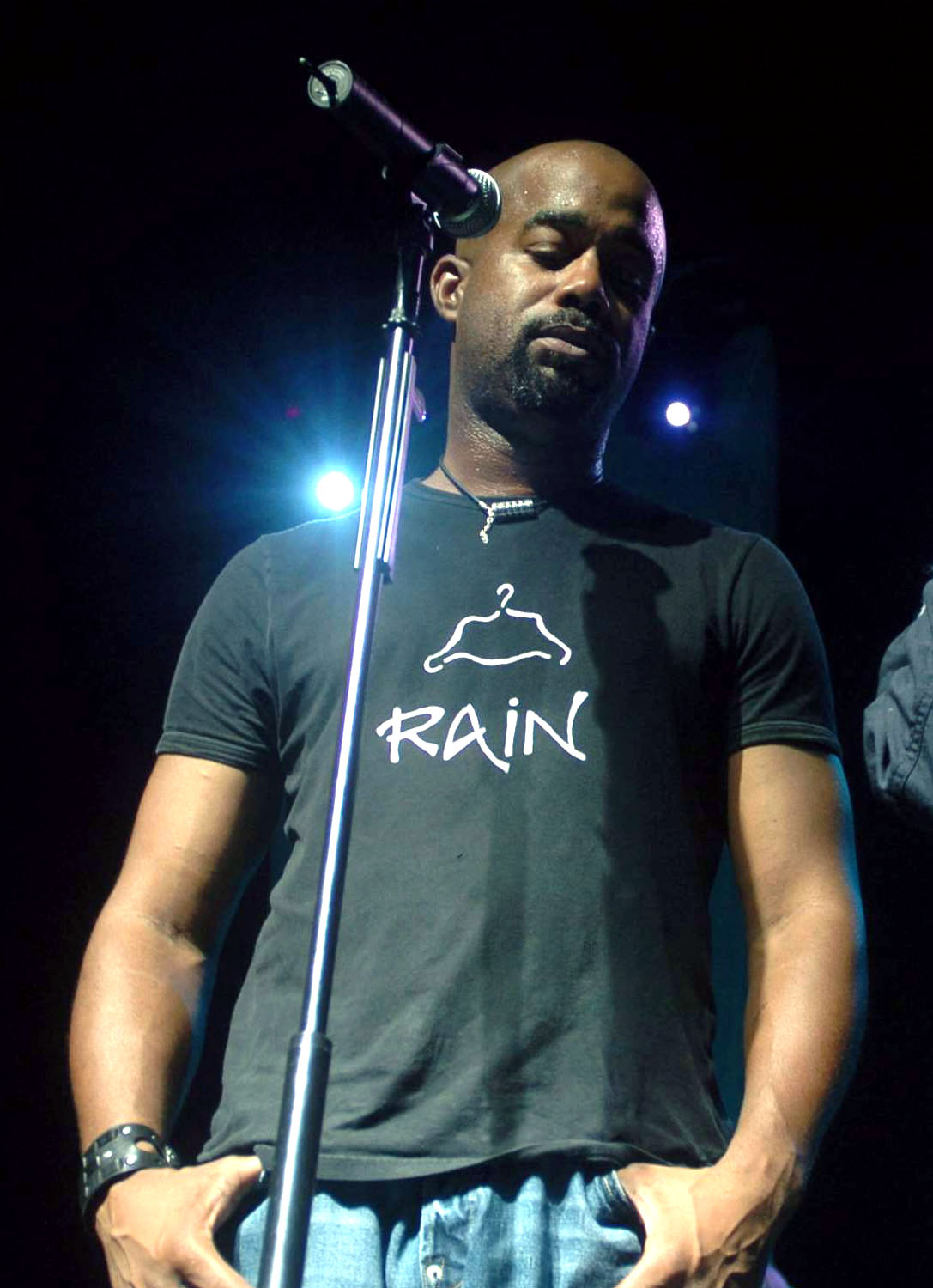
Southern Style was a chart-topper for Darius Rucker.

| Issue date | Title | Artist(s) | Ref. |
|---|---|---|---|
| January 3 | Man Against Machine | Garth Brooks | |
| January 10 | Man Against Machine | Garth Brooks | |
| January 17 | Old Boots, New Dirt | Jason Aldean | |
| January 24 | Man Against Machine | Garth Brooks | |
| January 31 | Montevallo | Sam Hunt | |
| February 7 | Montevallo | Sam Hunt | |
| February 14 | Montevallo | Sam Hunt | |
| February 21 | Montevallo | Sam Hunt | |
| February 28 | Holding All the Roses | Blackberry Smoke | |
| March 7 | The Underdog | Aaron Watson | |
| March 14 | Montevallo | Sam Hunt | |
| March 21 | Montevallo | Sam Hunt | |
| March 28 | Spring Break...Checkin' Out | Luke Bryan | |
| April 4 | Spring Break...Checkin' Out | Luke Bryan | |
| April 11 | Spring Break...Checkin' Out | Luke Bryan | |
| April 18 | Southern Style | Darius Rucker | |
| April 25 | Southern Style | Darius Rucker | |
| May 2 | Love Somebody | Reba McEntire | |
| May 9 | Love Somebody | Reba McEntire | |
| May 16 | Jekyll + Hyde | Zac Brown Band | |
| May 23 | Jekyll + Hyde | Zac Brown Band | |
| May 30 | Jekyll + Hyde | Zac Brown Band | |
| June 6 | Just as I Am | Brantley Gilbert | |
| June 13 | Jekyll + Hyde | Zac Brown Band | |
| June 20 | Django and Jimmie | Willie Nelson and Merle Haggard | |
| June 27 | Now That's What I Call Country Volume 8 | Various Artists | |
| July 4 | Jekyll + Hyde | Zac Brown Band | |
| July 11 | Pageant Material | Kacey Musgraves | |
| July 18 | About to Get Real | Easton Corbin | |
| July 25 | About to Get Real | Easton Corbin | |
| August 1 | Montevallo | Sam Hunt | |
| August 8 | Something More Than Free | Jason Isbell | |
| August 15 | Angels and Alcohol | Alan Jackson | |
| August 22 | Montevallo | Sam Hunt | |
| August 29 | Kill the Lights | Luke Bryan | |
| September 5 | Kill the Lights | Luke Bryan | |
| September 12 | Kill the Lights | Luke Bryan | |
| September 19 | Kill the Lights | Luke Bryan | |
| September 26 | Kill the Lights | Luke Bryan | |
| October 3 | Illinois | Brett Eldredge | |
| October 10 | Kill the Lights | Luke Bryan | |
| October 17 | Cass County | Don Henley | |
| October 24 | Cold Beer Conversation | George Strait | |
| October 31 | Kill the Lights | Luke Bryan | |
| November 7 | Kill the Lights | Luke Bryan | |
| November 14 | Storyteller | Carrie Underwood | |
| November 21 | Traveller | Chris Stapleton | |
| November 28 | Traveller | Chris Stapleton | |
| December 5 | I'm Comin' Over | Chris Young | |
| December 12 | Traveller | Chris Stapleton | |
| December 19 | Storyteller | Carrie Underwood | |
| December 26 | Traveller | Chris Stapleton | |

== See also ==
- 2015 in music
- List of number-one country singles of 2015 (U.S.)
