= List of number-one country singles of 2015 (Canada) =

Canada Country was a chart published weekly by Billboard magazine.

This 50-position chart lists the most popular country music songs, calculated weekly by airplay on 31 country music stations across the country as monitored by Nielsen BDS. Songs are ranked by total plays. As with most other Billboard charts, the Canada Country chart features a rule for when a song enters recurrent rotation. A song is declared recurrent if it has been on the chart longer than 30 weeks and is lower than number 20 in rank.

These are the Canadian number-one country singles of 2015, per the BDS Canada Country Airplay chart.

Note that Billboard publishes charts with an issue date approximately 7–10 days in advance.

"Lose My Mind" by Brett Eldredge attained the number-one spot on the year-end chart despite only attaining a weekly chart position peak of number two.

Issue date	Country Song	Artist	Ref.
January 3	"Til It's Gone"	Kenny Chesney	
January 10	"Talladega"	Eric Church	
January 17	"Til It's Gone"	Kenny Chesney	
January 24	"Til It's Gone"	Kenny Chesney	
January 31	"Wastin' Gas"	Dallas Smith	
February 7	"Wastin' Gas"	Dallas Smith	
February 14	"I See You"	Luke Bryan	
February 21	"I See You"	Luke Bryan	
February 28	"Lonely Tonight"	Blake Shelton feat. Ashley Monroe	
March 7	"Lonely Tonight"	Blake Shelton feat. Ashley Monroe	
March 14	"Lonely Tonight"	Blake Shelton feat. Ashley Monroe	
March 21	"Lonely Tonight"	Blake Shelton feat. Ashley Monroe	
March 28	"Homegrown"	Zac Brown Band	
April 4	"Homegrown"	Zac Brown Band	
April 11	"Homegrown"	Zac Brown Band	
April 18	"Homegrown"	Zac Brown Band	
April 25	"Homegrown"	Zac Brown Band	
May 2	"Raise 'Em Up"	Keith Urban feat. Eric Church	
May 9	"Raise 'Em Up"	Keith Urban feat. Eric Church	
May 16	"Raise 'Em Up"	Keith Urban feat. Eric Church	
May 23	"Raise 'Em Up"	Keith Urban feat. Eric Church	
May 30	"Sippin' on Fire"	Florida Georgia Line	
June 6	"Smoke"	A Thousand Horses	
June 13	"Don't It"	Billy Currington	
June 20	"Smoke"	A Thousand Horses	
June 27	"Sangria"	Blake Shelton	
July 4	"Sangria"	Blake Shelton	
July 11	"Sangria"	Blake Shelton	
July 18	"Tonight Looks Good on You"	Jason Aldean	
July 25	"Tonight Looks Good on You"	Jason Aldean	
August 1	"Tonight Looks Good on You"	Jason Aldean	
August 8	"Kick the Dust Up"	Luke Bryan	
August 15	"Kick the Dust Up"	Luke Bryan	
August 22	"Kick the Dust Up"	Luke Bryan	
August 29	"Crash and Burn"	Thomas Rhett	
September 5	"John Cougar, John Deere, John 3:16"	Keith Urban	
September 12	"John Cougar, John Deere, John 3:16"	Keith Urban	
September 19	"John Cougar, John Deere, John 3:16"	Keith Urban	
September 26	"John Cougar, John Deere, John 3:16"	Keith Urban	
October 3	"Airwaves"	Brett Kissel	
October 10	"Save It for a Rainy Day"	Kenny Chesney	
October 17	"Save It for a Rainy Day"	Kenny Chesney	
October 24	"Save It for a Rainy Day"	Kenny Chesney	
October 31	"Save It for a Rainy Day"	Kenny Chesney	
November 7	"Anything Goes"	Florida Georgia Line	
November 14	"Strip It Down"	Luke Bryan	
November 21	"Gonna"	Blake Shelton	
November 28	"Smoke Break"	Carrie Underwood	
December 5	"Smoke Break"	Carrie Underwood	
December 12	"I'm Comin' Over"	Chris Young	
December 19	"I'm Comin' Over"	Chris Young	
December 26	"Die a Happy Man"	Thomas Rhett	

== See also ==
- 2015 in music
- List of number-one country singles of 2015 (U.S.)
