= List of Top Country Albums number ones of 2014 =

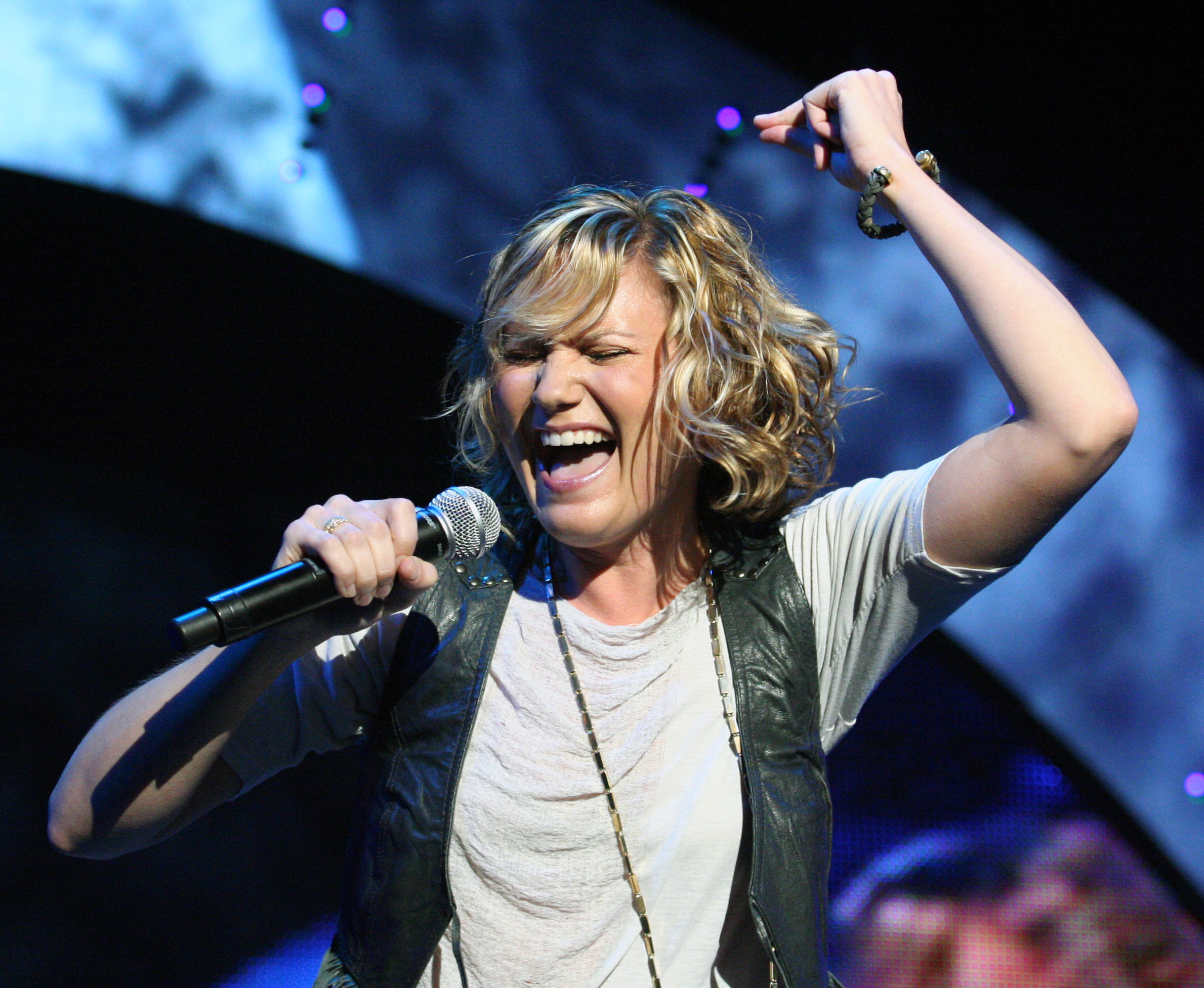
Jennifer Nettles of the band Sugarland topped the chart for the first time as a solo artist with That Girl.

Top Country Albums is a chart that ranks the top-performing country music albums in the United States, published by Billboard. In 2014, 29 different albums topped the chart; placings were based on electronic point of sale data from retail outlets.

In the issue of Billboard dated January 4, Garth Brooks was at number one with Blame It All on My Roots: Five Decades of Influences, its fourth week in the top spot. It remained atop the chart the following week before being displaced by Crash My Party by Luke Bryan. Brooks and Bryan were among four acts to have two number ones during the year: Brooks returned to number one in December with Man Against Machine and Bryan spent a single week in the top spot with Spring Break 6...Like We Ain't Ever, the latest in an annual series of spring break-themed releases by the singer. The duo Florida Georgia Line spent time at number one with both Here's to the Good Times and Anything Goes. Blake Shelton spent one week at number one with Based on a True Story..., which had originally topped the chart more than a year earlier, and the same length of time with his next album Bringing Back the Sunshine.

Several of 2014's chart-topping acts, including Luke Bryan, Florida Georgia Line, Jason Aldean and Chase Rice, were associated with the so-called bro-country style, a sub-genre which incorporated influences from rock music and hip hop and often featured lyrics relating to partying, attractive young women, and pick-up trucks. Rice was one of a number of acts to reach number one for the first time in 2014, when he topped the listing with Ignite the Night in September. In February, Jennifer Nettles of the band Sugarland achieved her first solo chart-topper with That Girl. In March the Eli Young Band achieved the same feat with 10,000 Towns, as did Dan + Shay in April with Where It All Began. Brantley Gilbert was another first-time chart-topper in June with Just as I Am, as were Lee Brice in September with I Don't Dance and Sam Hunt in November with Montevallo. In April, Country Music Hall of Fame member Johnny Cash, who had died in 2003, gained a posthumous number one with Out Among the Stars, an album of previously unreleased material recorded in the 1980s.

== Chart history ==
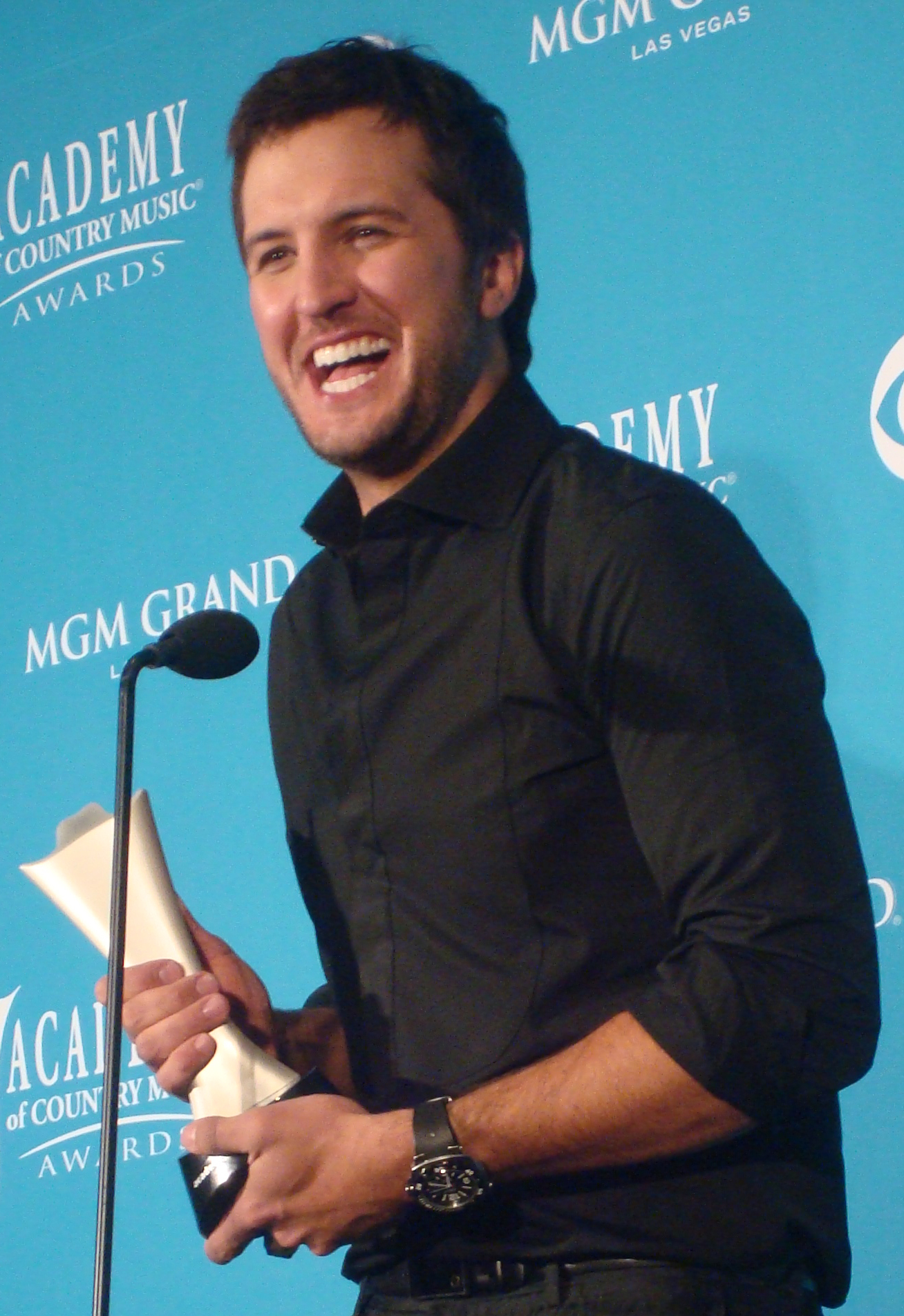
Luke Bryan spent seven weeks at number one in 2014, the most by any act.

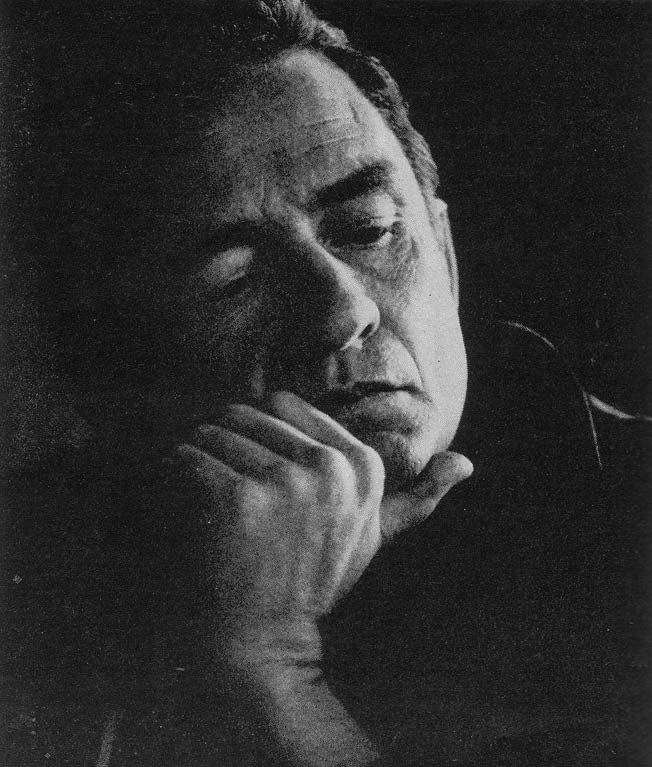
Out Among the Stars was a posthumous number one for Johnny Cash.

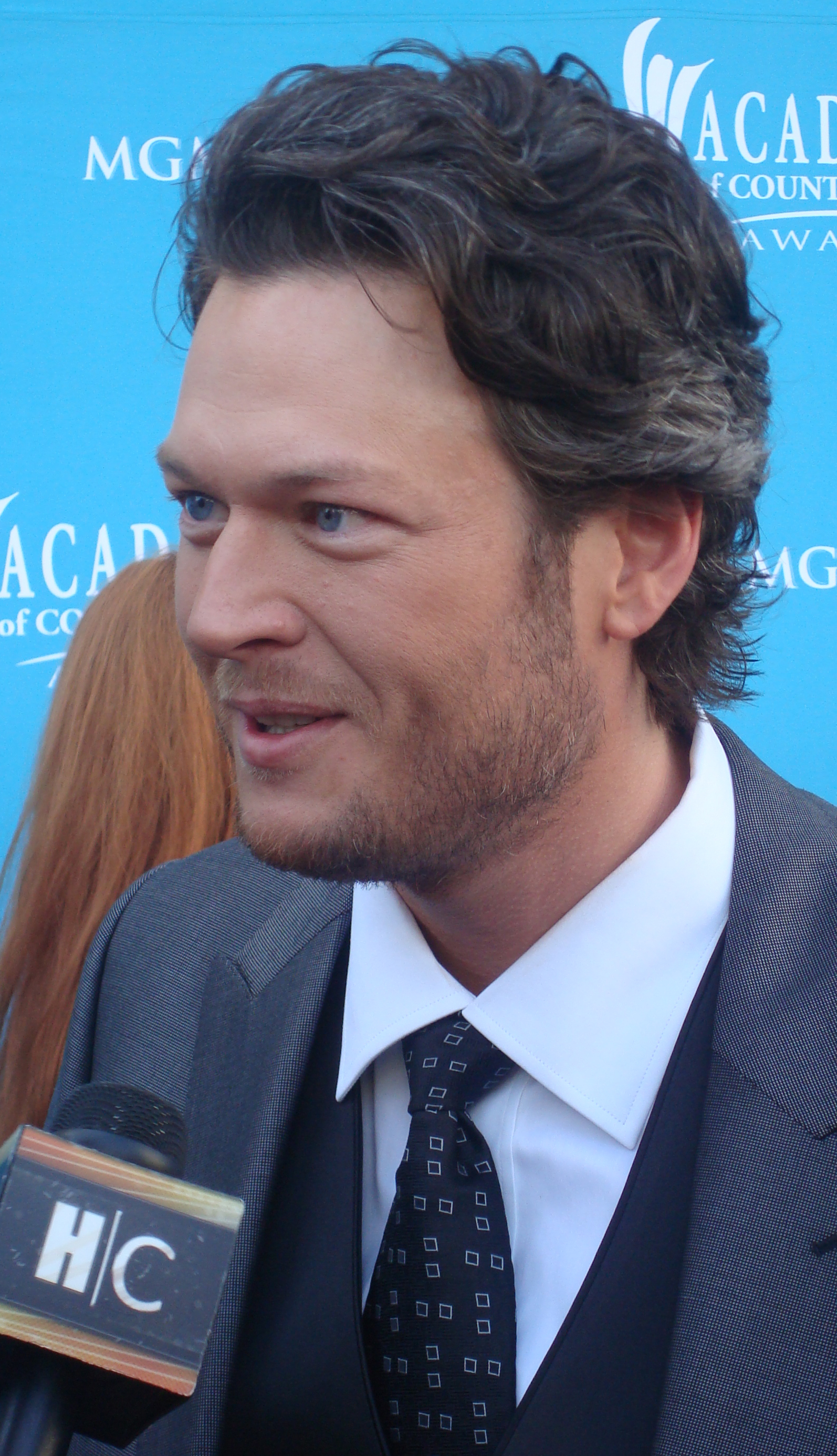
Blake Shelton's album Based on a True Story..., which had originally topped the chart the previous year, returned to number one in August 2014.

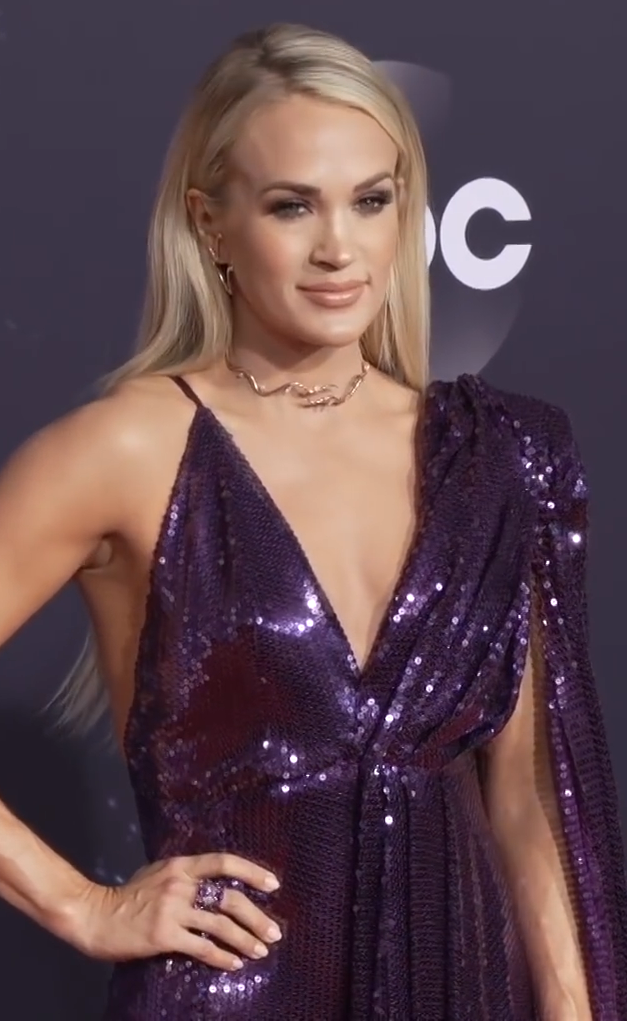
Carrie Underwood ended the year at number one.

Issue date	Title	Artist(s)	Ref.
January 4	Blame It All on My Roots: Five Decades of Influences	Garth Brooks	
January 11	Blame It All on My Roots: Five Decades of Influences	Garth Brooks	
January 18	Crash My Party	Luke Bryan	
January 25	Here's to the Good Times	Florida Georgia Line	
February 1	That Girl	Jennifer Nettles	
February 8	That Girl	Jennifer Nettles	
February 15	Same Trailer Different Park	Kacey Musgraves	
February 22	Here's to the Good Times	Florida Georgia Line	
March 1	The Outsiders	Eric Church	
March 8	The Outsiders	Eric Church	
March 15	Riser	Dierks Bentley	
March 22	10,000 Towns	Eli Young Band	
March 29	Spring Break 6...Like We Ain't Ever	Luke Bryan	
April 5	The Outsiders	Eric Church	
April 12	Out Among the Stars	Johnny Cash	
April 19	Where It All Began	Dan + Shay	
April 26	Everlasting	Martina McBride	
May 3	Crash My Party	Luke Bryan	
May 10	Crash My Party	Luke Bryan	
May 17	Crash My Party	Luke Bryan	
May 24	Storyline	Hunter Hayes	
May 31	Rewind	Rascal Flatts	
June 7	Just as I Am	Brantley Gilbert	
June 14	Just as I Am	Brantley Gilbert	
June 21	Platinum	Miranda Lambert	
June 28	Platinum	Miranda Lambert	
July 5	Band of Brothers	Willie Nelson	
July 12	Platinum	Miranda Lambert	
July 19	Platinum	Miranda Lambert	
July 26	Platinum	Miranda Lambert	
August 2	Based on a True Story...	Blake Shelton	
August 9	Just as I Am	Brantley Gilbert	
August 16	Just as I Am	Brantley Gilbert	
August 23	Crash My Party	Luke Bryan	
August 30	Crash My Party	Luke Bryan	
September 6	Ignite the Night	Chase Rice	
September 13	Moonshine in the Trunk	Brad Paisley	
September 20	Platinum	Miranda Lambert	
September 27	I Don't Dance	Lee Brice	
October 4	Sundown Heaven Town	Tim McGraw	
October 11	The Big Revival	Kenny Chesney	
October 18	Bringing Back the Sunshine	Blake Shelton	
October 25	Old Boots, New Dirt	Jason Aldean	
November 1	Anything Goes	Florida Georgia Line	
November 8	Anything Goes	Florida Georgia Line	
November 15	Montevallo	Sam Hunt	
November 22	Old Boots, New Dirt	Jason Aldean	
November 29	Man Against Machine	Garth Brooks	
December 6	Man Against Machine	Garth Brooks	
December 13	Man Against Machine	Garth Brooks	
December 20	Man Against Machine	Garth Brooks	
December 27	Greatest Hits: Decade #1	Carrie Underwood	

== See also ==
- 2014 in music
- List of number-one country singles of 2014 (U.S.)
