= X2C =

EP by Sam Hunt
- Released: August 12, 2014
- Recorded: 2013–14
- Genre: Country
- Label: MCA Nashville
- Producer: Zach Crowell; Shane McAnally

Sam Hunt chronology
Between the Pines (2013)	X2C (2014)	Montevallo (2014)

X2C (pronounced "ex to see") is the debut extended play (EP) by American country music singer Sam Hunt, released on August 8, 2014, by MCA Nashville. Featuring his debut single, "Leave the Night On", and three other songs recorded for the album, the EP served as a preview for Hunt's then-forthcoming debut studio album Montevallo (2014). It debuted in the top five of the Billboard Top Country Albums chart and the top 40 of the all-genre US Billboard 200. The album's title is derived from the title of the track "Ex to See" and is a play on the homophone "ecstasy".

== Track listing ==
No.	Title	Writer(s)	Length
1.	"Leave the Night On"	Sam Hunt; Josh Osborne; Shane McAnally	3:11
2.	"Ex to See"	Hunt; Osborne; Matt Ramsey	3:18
3.	"House Party"	Hunt; Zach Crowell; Jerry Flowers	3:10
4.	"Break Up in a Small Town"	Hunt; Crowell; McAnally	3:49

== Critical and commercial reception ==
=== Critical reception ===
Alanna Conaway of Country Weekly gave the EP a highly positive A+ review, praising Hunt as both songwriter and vocalist. "The layers of detail in each song on X2C shows the brilliance in the minds of Sam and his producers", writes Conaway, "putting him on the cutting edge of the next wave of what's to come". Jon Caramanica of The New York Times was somewhat more critical, highlighting the lack of country influences while also comparing Hunt to Drake. He described the record as "stylistically provocative" and a "fascinating, odd [...] tug of war between muscle and heart".

=== Commercial reception ===
X2C debuted at number five on the Billboard Top Country Albums chart, the highest debut of the week on that chart, for the week of August 17, 2014. It also debuted at number 36 on the US Billboard 200 that same week. The album sold 8,000 units in its first week of release. As of February 2015, the EP has sold 31,000 units. All four tracks charted in the top 40 of the Hot Country Songs chart due to substantial digital downloads.

== Chart performance ==
Chart (2014)	Peak position
US Billboard 200	36
US Top Country Albums (Billboard)	5
