= List of Billboard 200 number-one albums of 2014 =

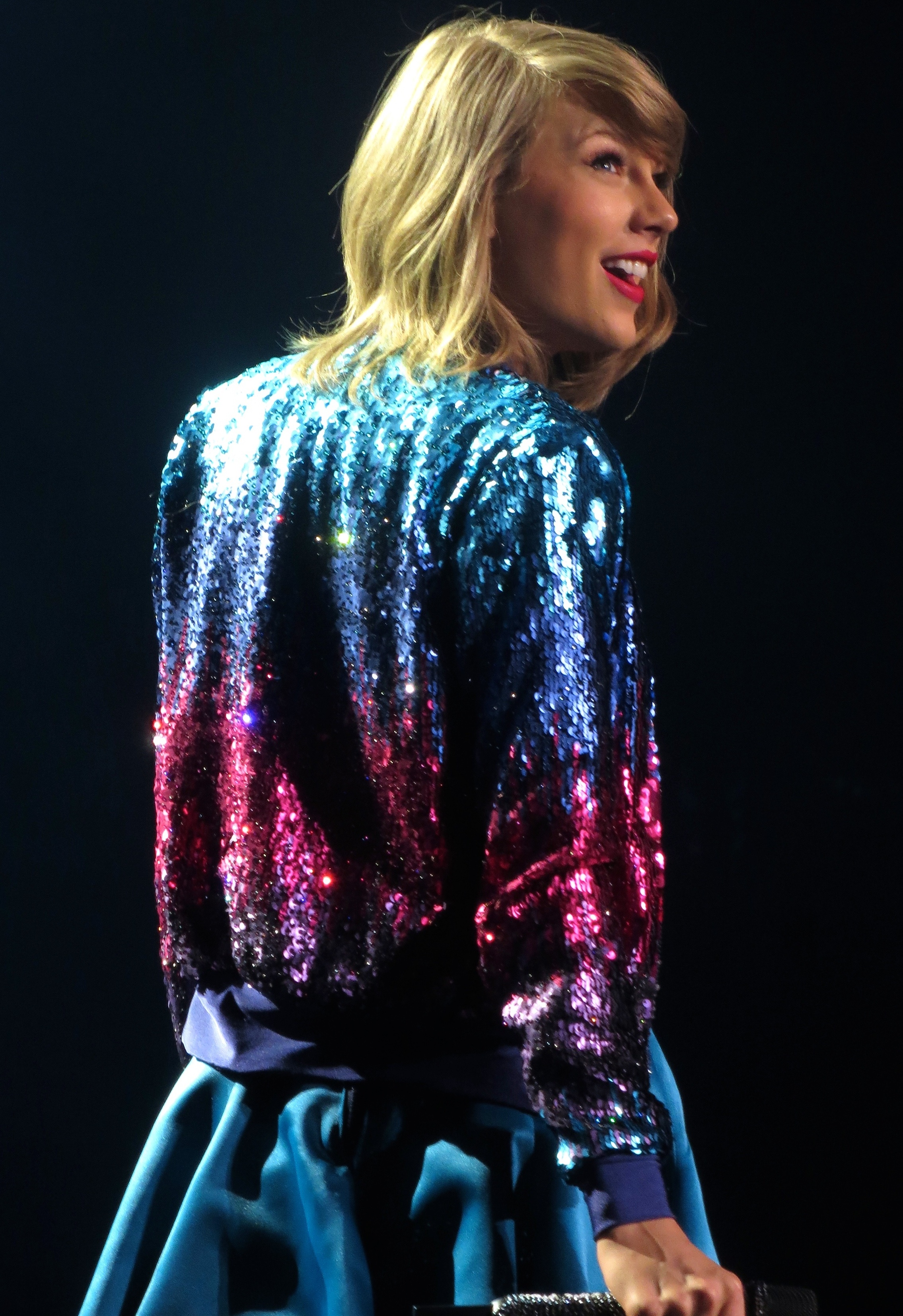
Taylor Swift's 1989 gave her the fourth Billboard 200 number-one debut of her career. It earned the largest sales week of 2014, with over 1.28 million copies sold in its opening week.

The highest-selling albums and EPs in the United States are ranked in the Billboard 200, which is published by Billboard magazine. The data are compiled by Nielsen Soundscan based on each album's weekly physical and digital sales. In 2014, a total of 33 albums claimed the top position of the chart. One of which, American R&B singer Beyoncé's self-titled visual album started its peak in late 2013.

The soundtrack to the 2013 Disney film, Frozen was the longest-running number-one album of the year, staying atop the chart for thirteen non-consecutive weeks. Other albums with extended chart runs include Beyoncé's self-titled visual album, Ghost Stories by Coldplay, the Marvel soundtrack Guardians of the Galaxy: Awesome Mix Vol. 1 and 1989 by Taylor Swift; only three albums spent two weeks on the top position.

The Frozen soundtrack sold 165,000 additional copies in its sixth week upon its release, bringing its sales up to nearly 2.7 million units, becoming the highest-selling album during the debut week. Taylor Swift's 1989 sold 1.28 million copies in its first week, making it the second album with the highest sales during the opening week, since 2002 when Eminem's third album, The Eminem Show opened up with 1.3 million.

Between the weeks of December 6 and 13, the Billboard 200 switched from tracking pure album sales to album-equivalent units.

== Chart history ==
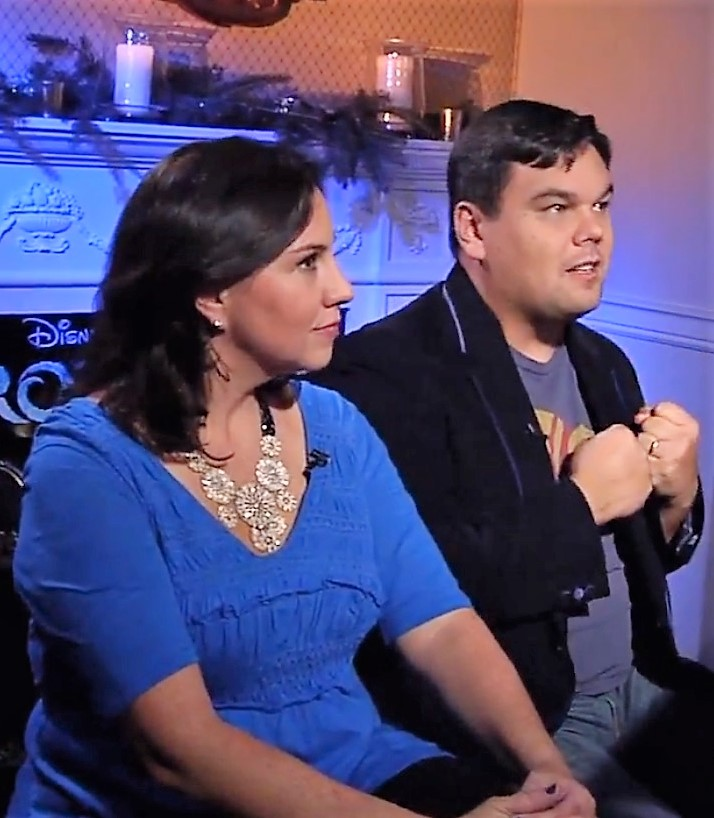
The soundtrack of Frozen was the longest running number-one album of 2014, spending a total of 13 weeks atop the chart. It was written by Robert and Kristen Anderson Lopez (pictured).

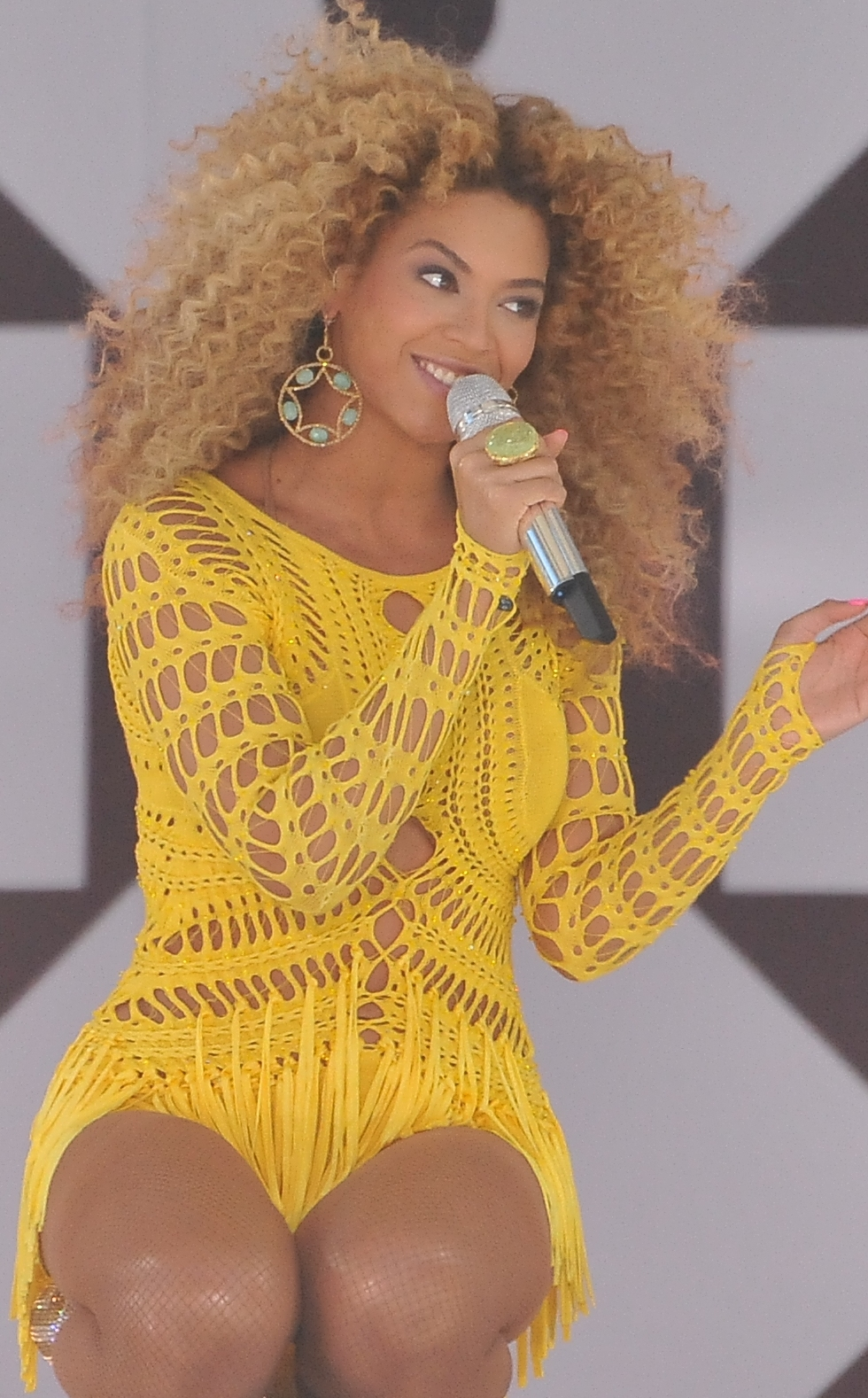
Beyoncé's self-titled 2013 studio album earned its second and third chart-topping weeks in January 2014.

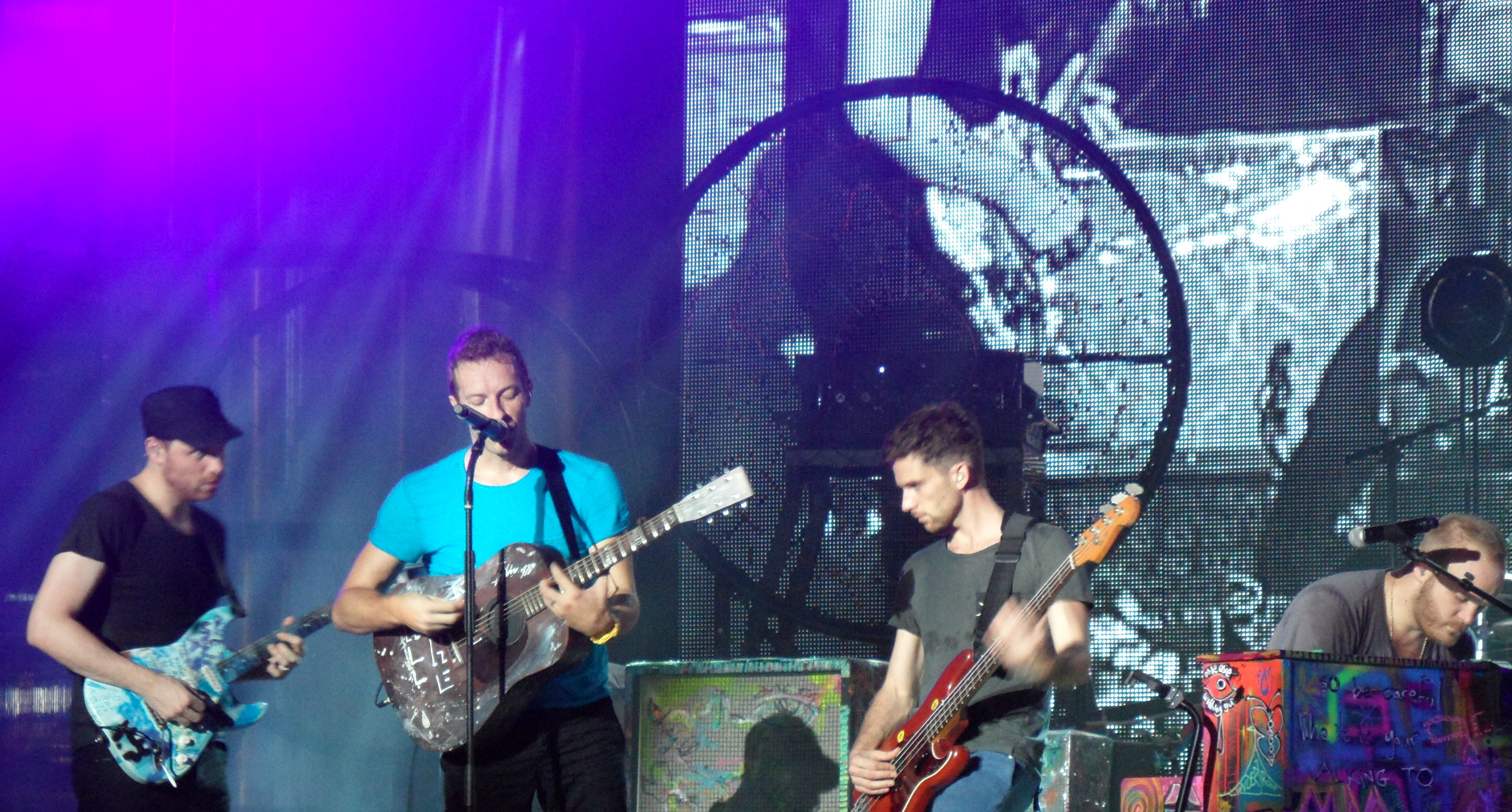
Alternative rock band Coldplay's sixth album, Ghost Stories, gave the band their fourth number-one album to date. It spent two weeks atop the chart.

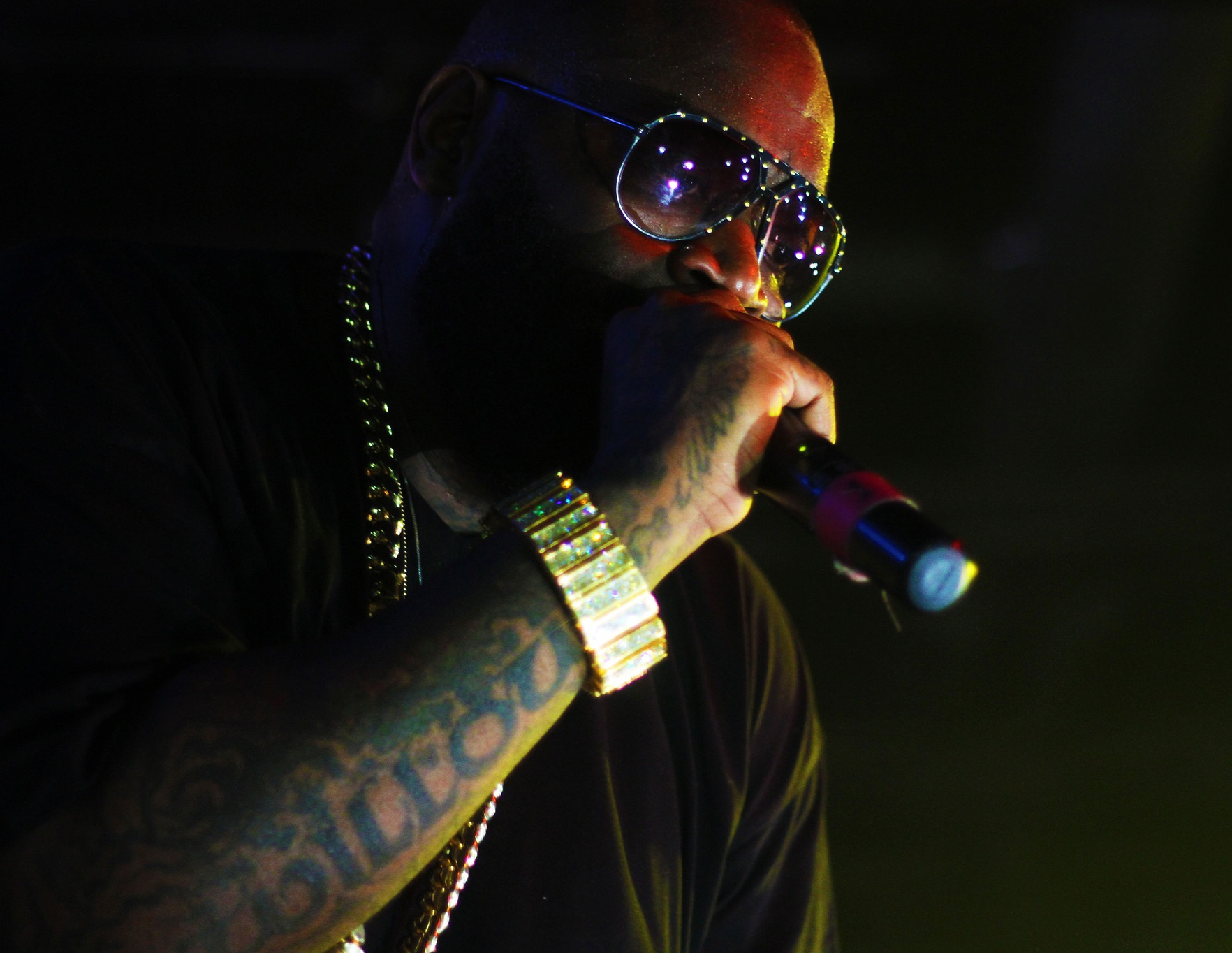
Rapper Rick Ross gained his fifth number-one album of 2014 with his sixth studio album, Mastermind.

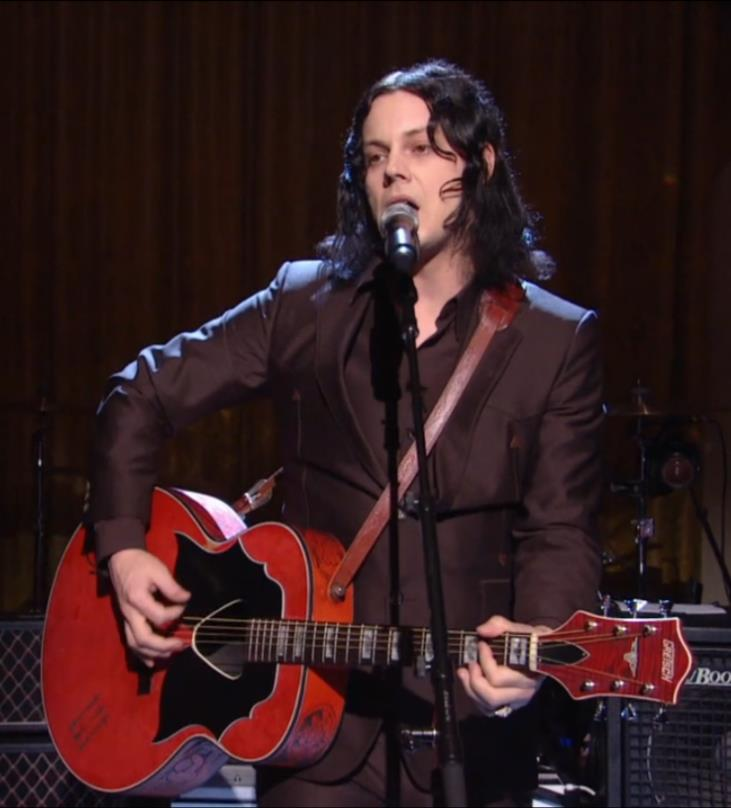
Rock singer Jack White's sophomore album, Lazaretto, gave the artist his second number-one album in the country to date.

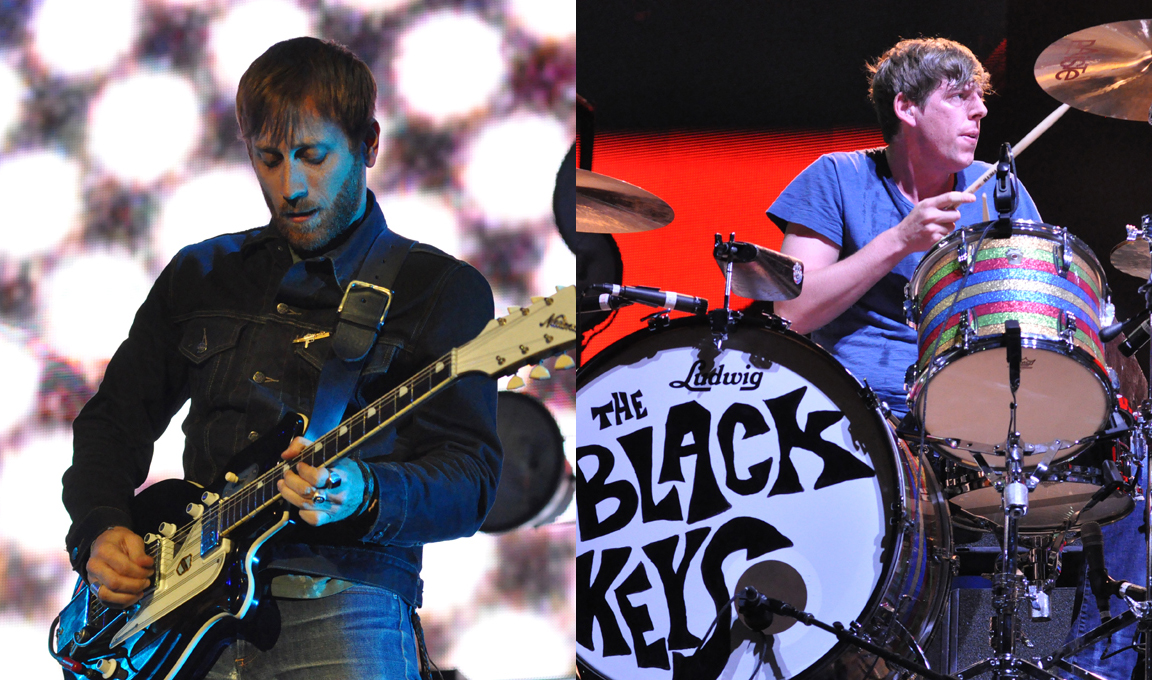
Rock band The Black Keys earned a number-one album in the country with their eighth studio album, Turn Blue.

Key
†	Indicates best performing album of 2014

Issue date	Album	Artist(s)	Sales/Album- equivalent units	Ref.
January 4	Beyoncé	Beyoncé	374,000	
January 11	Beyoncé	Beyoncé	310,000	
January 18	Frozen (Original Motion Picture Soundtrack) †	Soundtrack	165,000	
January 25	Frozen (Original Motion Picture Soundtrack) †	Soundtrack	86,000	
February 1	High Hopes	Bruce Springsteen	99,000	
February 8	Frozen (Original Motion Picture Soundtrack) †	Soundtrack	93,000	
February 15	Frozen (Original Motion Picture Soundtrack) †	Soundtrack	94,000	
February 22	Now 49	Various Artists	98,000	
March 1	The Outsiders	Eric Church	288,000	
March 8	Frozen (Original Motion Picture Soundtrack) †	Soundtrack	89,000	
March 15	Oxymoron	Schoolboy Q	139,000	
March 22	Mastermind	Rick Ross	179,000	
March 29	Frozen (Original Motion Picture Soundtrack) †	Soundtrack	99,000	
April 5	Frozen (Original Motion Picture Soundtrack) †	Soundtrack	202,000	
April 12	Frozen (Original Motion Picture Soundtrack) †	Soundtrack	161,000	
April 19	Frozen (Original Motion Picture Soundtrack) †	Soundtrack	149,000	
April 26	Frozen (Original Motion Picture Soundtrack) †	Soundtrack	133,000	
May 3	Frozen (Original Motion Picture Soundtrack) †	Soundtrack	259,000	
May 10	Frozen (Original Motion Picture Soundtrack) †	Soundtrack	115,000	
May 17	Frozen (Original Motion Picture Soundtrack) †	Soundtrack	106,000	
May 24	Now 50	Various Artists	153,000	
May 31	Turn Blue	The Black Keys	164,000	
June 7	Ghost Stories	Coldplay	383,000	
June 14	Ghost Stories	Coldplay	83,000	
June 21	Platinum	Miranda Lambert	180,000	
June 28	Lazaretto	Jack White	138,000	
July 5	Ultraviolence	Lana Del Rey	182,000	
July 12	x	Ed Sheeran	210,000	
July 19	Trigga	Trey Songz	105,000	
July 26	1000 Forms of Fear	Sia	52,000	
August 2	Mandatory Fun	"Weird Al" Yankovic	104,000	
August 9	5 Seconds of Summer	5 Seconds of Summer	259,000	
August 16	Hypnotic Eye	Tom Petty and the Heartbreakers	131,000	
August 23	Guardians of the Galaxy: Awesome Mix Vol. 1 (Original Motion Picture Soundtrack)	Soundtrack	109,000	
August 30	Guardians of the Galaxy: Awesome Mix Vol. 1 (Original Motion Picture Soundtrack)	Soundtrack	93,000	
September 6	Blacc Hollywood	Wiz Khalifa	90,000	
September 13	My Everything	Ariana Grande	169,000	
September 20	V	Maroon 5	164,000	
September 27	Anomaly	Lecrae	88,000	
October 4	Partners	Barbra Streisand	196,000	
October 11	Cheek to Cheek	Tony Bennett and Lady Gaga	131,000	
October 18	Bringing Back the Sunshine	Blake Shelton	101,000	
October 25	Old Boots, New Dirt	Jason Aldean	278,000	
November 1	Anything Goes	Florida Georgia Line	197,000	
November 8	.5: The Gray Chapter	Slipknot	132,000	
November 15	1989	Taylor Swift	1,287,000	
November 22	1989	Taylor Swift	402,000	
November 29	1989	Taylor Swift	312,000	
December 6	Four	One Direction	387,000	
December 13	1989	Taylor Swift	339,000	
December 20	1989	Taylor Swift	274,000	
December 27	2014 Forest Hills Drive	J. Cole	375,000	

== See also ==
- 2014 in music
- List of Billboard Hot 100 number-one singles of 2014
- List of Billboard number-one country albums of 2014
