= American Kids =

Single by Kenny Chesney

from the album The Big Revival
- Released: June 20, 2014
- Recorded: 2014
- Genre: Country
- Length: 3:02
- Label: Blue Chair; Columbia Nashville
- Songwriters: Rodney Clawson; Luke Laird; Shane McAnally
- Producers: Kenny Chesney; Buddy Cannon

Kenny Chesney singles chronology
"When I See This Bar" (2013)	"American Kids" (2014)	"Til It's Gone" (2014)

"American Kids" is a song written by Rodney Clawson, Luke Laird, and Shane McAnally and recorded by American country music artist Kenny Chesney. It was released in June 2014 as the first single from Chesney's 2014 album The Big Revival. After its official release, the song became available for sale on June 21 that year.

== Background ==
Chesney heard the tune during a writers' retreat with McAnally, and according to Chesney: "It was unlike anything I'd ever heard... it just grabs you and holds on, but even more importantly, it feels really good." He also said that "there is so much more to being alive than partying, tailgates and bonfires," and that "American kids are so much more complicated, more fun, more real".

== Reception ==
=== Critical ===
The song received mostly good reviews by critics with some mixed reactions. Matt Bjorke of Roughstock described the song as "groove-filled" with "perfect" delivery by Chesney, that the "flair for nostalgia" by the songwriters brought the song to life, and also that "the final production of the track easily makes it something radio and fans are certain to eat up". The song was described as "catchy" and "highly relatable", and Melinda Newman of Billboard thought that the song "captures the zeitgeist of American youth in a way that John Mellencamp once owned." For the Country Record called the song "refreshingly original" by not following the "current country clichés" about tailgates, beers and girls, Country Perspective called the song "a feel good song that is fun and light-hearted" that is hard to hate, but nevertheless did not love the song.

=== Commercial ===
The song received 117 radio adds on its first week of release, and debuted at No. 27 on the Country Airplay chart, which is Chesney's 10th top-30 debut and this total is the most of any artist since the chart was launched in 1990. It also debuted at No. 82 on the Billboard Hot 100 and No. 17 on the Hot Country Songs chart with 40,000 downloads sold in less than three full days of sales. In the following week, it reached No. 1 on the Country Digital Songs chart and No. 6 on the Hot Country Songs chart with 74,000 copies sold after a full week of sale. The song peaked at No. 23 on the Billboard Hot 100, and No. 7 on the Hot Country Songs chart. The song reached its millionth sales mark in October 2014. As of April 2015, the song has sold 1,266,000 copies in the US.

== Music video ==
The music video was directed by Shaun Silva and was released on June 30, 2014. It shows Chesney partying and making music with a group of young men and women in a brightly colored school bus. Some have suggested the bus in the video is a nod to Ken Kesey and the Merry Pranksters and their bus Further. According to Chesney, "[t]he spirit of this thing — the song, the bus, the idea of the kids riding around, having fun, playing music and just celebrating life — makes you want to get involved," and that "[f]un is where and how you make it."

== Charts and certifications ==
=== Weekly charts ===
Chart (2014)	Peak position
Canada Hot 100 (Billboard)	27
Canada Country (Billboard)	1
Czech Republic Singles Digital (ČNS IFPI)	66
Slovakia Singles Digital (ČNS IFPI)	74
US Billboard Hot 100	23
US Country Airplay (Billboard)	1
US Hot Country Songs (Billboard)	2

=== Year-end charts ===
Chart (2014)	Position
Canada Canadian Hot 100	88
US Billboard Hot 100	73
US Country Airplay (Billboard)	33
US Hot Country Songs (Billboard)	6

=== Certifications ===
Region	Certification	Certified units/sales
United States (RIAA)	5× Platinum	5,000,000^{‡}
^{‡} Sales+streaming figures based on certification alone.
