= Games (Luke Bryan song) =

Promotional single by Luke Bryan

from the album Spring Break...Checkin' Out
- Released: February 24, 2015
- Genre: Country
- Length: 2:56
- Label: Capitol Nashville
- Songwriter(s): Luke Bryan; Ashley Gorley
- Producer(s): Jeff Stevens

"Games" is a song performed by American country music artist Luke Bryan from his seventh extended play Spring Break...Checkin' Out (2015). It was written by Bryan and Ashley Gorley. First released to digital retailers on February 24, 2015 as the first promotional single off the EP, the song later received airplay on country radio.

== Content ==
"Games" is a mid-tempo country song about the frustration of people that the narrator cares about "playing games" rather than being upfront about their feelings. The song has been praised by critics such as Bob Paxman at Country Weekly for departing from the "party" theme of Bryan's spring break releases and dealing maturely with the topic.

== Commercial reception ==
Despite not being officially promoted as a radio single by his label, "Games" was the ninth-most-added song on country radio for the week of March 16, 2015. "Games" debuted on the US Billboard Hot Country Songs chart at number 25 and on the Billboard Canadian Hot 100 chart at number 46 for the week of March 14, 2015. It also debuted from unsolicited airplay for the week of March 21, 2015, at number 57 on the US Billboard Country Airplay chart. "Games" entered the Billboard Hot 100 chart at number 97 for the week of March 28, 2015. The song has sold 293,000 copies in the US as of August 2015.

== Chart performance ==
| Chart (2015) | Peak position |
|---|---|
| Canada (Canadian Hot 100) | 46 |
| Canada Country (Billboard) | 32 |
| US Billboard Hot 100 | 92 |
| US Country Airplay (Billboard) | 20 |
| US Hot Country Songs (Billboard) | 21 |

=== Year-end charts ===
| Chart (2015) | Position |
|---|---|
| US Country Airplay (Billboard) | 95 |
| US Hot Country Songs (Billboard) | 68 |

== Certifications and sales ==
| Region | Certification | Certified units/sales |
|---|---|---|
| United States (RIAA) | Gold | 500,000^{‡} |
^{‡} Sales+streaming figures based on certification alone.
