= The Big Revival =

Studio album by Kenny Chesney
- Released: September 23, 2014
- Recorded: 2014
- Studios: Blackbird (Nashville, Tennessee); House of Blues Studio (Nashville, Tennessee); Ocean Way (Nashville, Tennessee); Sound Emporium (Nashville, Tennessee); Westlake (Los Angeles, California)
- Genre: Country
- Length: 38:29
- Labels: Blue Chair; Columbia Nashville
- Producers: Buddy Cannon; Kenny Chesney

Kenny Chesney chronology
Life on a Rock (2013)	The Big Revival (2014)	Cosmic Hallelujah (2016)

Singles from The Big Revival
- 1. "American Kids" Released: June 20, 2014; 2. "Til It's Gone" Released: October 13, 2014; 3. "Wild Child" Released: February 2, 2015; 4. "Save It for a Rainy Day" Released: June 29, 2015

The Big Revival is the sixteenth studio album by American country music artist Kenny Chesney. It was released via Blue Chair and Columbia Records on September 23, 2014.

== Content ==
Chesney produced the album with Buddy Cannon, who has produced his other albums starting in 1997 with I Will Stand.

The album produced four singles — "American Kids", "Til It's Gone", "Wild Child", and "Save It for a Rainy Day", all of which reached number one on the U.S. Billboard Country Airplay chart.

The album's title track was previously recorded by John Anderson on his 2001 album Nobody's Got It All, and later by Montgomery Gentry on their 2008 album Back When I Knew It All.

== Critical reception ==
Professional ratings
Review scores
Source	Rating
AllMusic	4.5/5 stars
Billboard	3.5/5 stars
Newsday	B+
Rolling Stone	3.5/5 stars

Stephen Thomas Erlewine saying for AllMusic, how "Chesney overhauls his core strengths, winding up with his best record in years." Writing for Rolling Stone, Nick Murray reveals Chesney "continuously brings a sense of musical energy and emotional urgency his previous easygoing albums have sometimes lacked." On behalf of Billboard, Melinda Newman foresees how "The Big Revival serves his faithful flock a generous helping of country salvation with all the breeziness of a long holiday weekend." Glenn Gamboa for Newsday proclaims the album to be "a big-tent collection of future hits that celebrates regular folks who stand up for each other."

== Commercial performance ==
The Big Revival debuted at number one on the US Billboard Top Country Albums chart, becoming Chesney's 13th album to do so, selling 130,000 copies in the United States during its first week. It is also Chesney's 10th consecutive studio album to peak in the Top 3 on the US Billboard 200 chart, debuting at number 2. As of May 2016, the album has sold 447,000 copies in the United States. On February 13, 2017, the album was certified gold by the Recording Industry Association of America (RIAA) for sales of over 500,000 copies in the United States.

In Canada, the album debuted at number six on the Canadian Albums Chart, selling 4,700 copies in its first week.

== Track listing ==
No.	Title	Writer(s)	Length
1.	"The Big Revival"	Dennis Linde	3:11
2.	"Drink It Up"	Rodney Clawson; Vicky McGehee; David Lee Murphy	2:47
3.	"Til It's Gone"	Clawson; Murphy; Jimmy Yeary	4:11
4.	"American Kids"	Clawson; Shane McAnally; Luke Laird	3:02
5.	"Wild Child" (duet with Grace Potter)	Kenny Chesney; McAnally; Josh Osborne	3:09
6.	"Beer Can Chicken"	Chesney; Ross Copperman; Murphy	4:07
7.	"Rock Bottom"	Craig Wiseman; Matt Dragstrem	3:41
8.	"Don't It"	Brent Cobb; Chase McGill	3:16
9.	"Save It for a Rainy Day"	Andrew Dorff; Matthew Ramsey; Brad Tursi	3:02
10.	"Flora-Bama"	Chesney; Copperman; Murphy	4:31
11.	"If This Bus Could Talk"	Chesney; Tom Douglas	4:52
Total length:			38:29

== Personnel ==
- Wyatt Beard – background vocals
- Pat Buchanan – acoustic guitar, electric guitar
- Tony Castle – synthesizer
- Jim Chapman – background vocals
- Kenny Chesney – lead vocals
- Rodney Clawson – background vocals
- Ashley Cleveland – background vocals
- Chad Cromwell – drums, percussion
- Eric Darken – percussion
- Matt Dragstrem – electric guitar, background vocals
- Nicolle Galyon – background vocals
- Kenny Greenberg – acoustic guitar, electric guitar
- Natalie Hemby – background vocals
- John Hobbs – Hammond B-3 organ, piano, Wurlitzer
- David Huff – programming
- Alison Krauss – background vocals
- Luke Laird – background vocals
- Paul Leim – cajón, drums, percussion
- Shane McAnally – background vocals
- Randy McCormick – keyboards, synthesizer
- Rob McNelley – electric guitar
- David Lee Murphy – background vocals
- Larry Paxton – bass guitar
- Grace Potter – background vocals on "Wild Child"
- Danny Rader – banjo, bouzouki, acoustic guitar, electric guitar, mandolin
- Michael Rhodes – bass guitar
- Mike Rojas – Hammond B-3 organ, Wurlitzer
- John Wesley Ryles – background vocals
- F. Reid Shippen – programming
- Jeff Taylor – accordion
- Dan Tyminski – acoustic guitar, background vocals
- John Willis – acoustic guitar

== Charts ==
=== Weekly charts ===
Chart (2014–15)	Peak position
Australian Albums (ARIA)	31
Canadian Albums (Billboard)	6
US Billboard 200	2
US Top Country Albums (Billboard)	1

=== Year-end charts ===
Chart (2014)	Position
US Billboard 200	72
US Top Country Albums (Billboard)	13

Chart (2015)	Position
US Billboard 200	84
US Top Country Albums (Billboard)	18

=== Singles ===
Year	Single	Peak chart positions					Certifications (sales threshold)
Year	Single	US Country	US Country Airplay	US	CAN Country	CAN	Certifications (sales threshold)
2014	"American Kids"	2	1	23	1	27	US: 5× Platinum
2014	"Til It's Gone"	8	1	60	1	75	US: Gold
2015	"Wild Child"	9	1	56	3	69	
2015	"Save It for a Rainy Day"	4	1	54	1	61	US: Platinum

== Certifications ==
Region	Certification	Certified units/sales
United States (RIAA)	Platinum	1,000,000^{‡}
^{‡} Sales+streaming figures based on certification alone.
