= Leave the Night On =

Single by Sam Hunt

from the album Montevallo
- Released: June 16, 2014
- Recorded: 2013
- Genre: Country
- Length: 3:12
- Label: MCA Nashville
- Songwriters: Sam Hunt; Josh Osborne; Shane McAnally
- Producers: Zach Crowell; Shane McAnally

Sam Hunt singles chronology
"Raised on It" (2013)	"Leave the Night On" (2014)	"Take Your Time" (2014)

Music video
- "Leave the Night On" on YouTube

"Leave the Night On" is a song co-written and recorded by American country music singer Sam Hunt. It was released to country radio, by MCA Nashville on June 16, 2014 as the lead single from his debut studio album Montevallo (2014). The song was written by Hunt, Shane McAnally and Josh Osborne.

== Critical reception ==
Matt Bjorke of Roughstock reviewed the single favorably, saying that "There will be some who see 'Leave the Night On' as nothing but another 'Bro' song but to me, it feels much different. Yes, it's about hanging out and having a good time with a girl you like under the moonlight, but it uses that theme as a vehicle to deliver a seriously strong debut single". Taste of Country also reviewed the song favorably, with their review saying that "Lyrically 'Leave the Night On' is thematically similar to some of the most popular country songs but that doesn't mean Hunt has stopped pushing the boundaries of traditional country music just yet. Perhaps the most unique aspect of Hunt's talent, what distinguishes him from other new artists, is his polished, hip-hop inspired cadence". Giving it a "B", Kevin John Coyne of Country Universe said that "I feel like I've heard this song so many times before that the artist has to work extra hard just to even keep my attention. Sam Hunt works pretty hard to do that. Not as a vocalist, mind you. But as a songwriter, which is what's put him on the map in the first place".

== Commercial performance ==
"Leave the Night On" debuted upon its release at number 26 on the Billboard Hot Country Songs chart, selling 22,000 copies. The song quickly climbed up the Country Airplay chart, and entered the US Billboard Hot 100 at number 98 on its second week of release. The song peaked at number 30 on the US Billboard Hot 100, and number one on both the Hot Country Songs and Country Airplay charts, for the week of November 15, 2014 after Hunt's debut studio album Montevallo was released. The album also debuted at number one on the Top Country Albums chart and number three on the US Billboard 200, making Hunt only the second solo male country artist in the Nielsen SoundScan-era to simultaneously lead the Top Country Albums and Hot Country Songs charts with a rookie release, more than 22 years after Billy Ray Cyrus achieved the same feat with his debut single "Achy Breaky Heart" and his debut studio album Some Gave All. The song was certified Platinum by the RIAA on October 28, 2014, and reached its millionth sales mark in the US in February 2015.

== Music video ==
The music video was directed by Brad Belanger and premiered in July 2014.

== Charts ==
=== Weekly charts ===
Chart (2014–2015)	Peak position
Canada Hot 100 (Billboard)	54
Canada Country (Billboard)	1
US Billboard Hot 100	30
US Country Airplay (Billboard)	1
US Hot Country Songs (Billboard)	1

=== Year-end charts ===
Chart (2014)	Position
US Billboard Hot 100	76
US Country Airplay (Billboard)	10
US Hot Country Songs (Billboard)	9

Chart (2015)	Position
US Hot Country Songs (Billboard)	85

== Certifications ==
Region	Certification	Certified units/sales
Canada (Music Canada)	3× Platinum	240,000^{‡}
United States (RIAA)	4× Platinum	4,000,000^{‡}
^{‡} Sales+streaming figures based on certification alone.
