= Wild Child (Kenny Chesney and Grace Potter song) =

Single by Kenny Chesney and Grace Potter

from the album The Big Revival
- Released: February 2, 2015
- Recorded: 2014
- Genre: Country
- Length: 3:08
- Label: Blue Chair; Columbia Nashville
- Songwriters: Kenny Chesney; Shane McAnally; Josh Osborne
- Producers: Buddy Cannon; Kenny Chesney

Kenny Chesney singles chronology
"Til It's Gone" (2014)	"Wild Child" (2015)	"Save It for a Rainy Day" (2015)

"Wild Child" is a song by American recording artists Kenny Chesney and Grace Potter. The song was co-written by Chesney, Shane McAnally, and Josh Osborne. It was released in February 2015 as the third single from the Chesney's album The Big Revival (2014). Potter had previously collaborated with Chesney for his singles "You and Tequila" and "El Cerrito Place".

== Background ==
In a cover story for Billboard, Chesney drew a comparison between "Wild Child" and bro country songs: “Over the last several years, it seems like anytime anybody sings about a woman, she’s in cutoff jeans, drinking and on a tailgate — they objectify the hell out of them! [...] But I’m at a point where I want to say something different about women”. He told Taste of Country that he wasn’t searching for another Grace Potter duet, but when he finished writing the song, he knew it was unavoidable. “When you write about women, the best place to start is their spirit, and there’s not a woman that has a better free spirit than Grace Potter”.

== Content ==
"Wild Child" finds its narrator falling for a strong and independent woman, whose spirit is free and whose nature is rebel.

== Critical reception ==
Giving it a B+, Bob Paxman of Country Weekly wrote that "Those who prefer party guy Kenny might find this a bit too mellow for their tastes. But give this bit of introspection a chance and you'll find some cool lyrics…and a fine message."

== Music video ==
The music video was directed by Shaun Silva and premiered on the USA Today website on February 11, 2015.

== Chart performance ==
The song has sold 242,000 copies in the United States as of June 2015.

=== Weekly charts ===
Chart (2015)	Peak position
Canada (Canadian Hot 100)	69
Canada Country (Billboard)	3
US Billboard Hot 100	56
US Country Airplay (Billboard)	1
US Hot Country Songs (Billboard)	9

=== Year-end charts ===
Chart (2015)	Position
US Country Airplay (Billboard)	37
US Hot Country Songs (Billboard)	56

== Certifications ==
Region	Certification	Certified units/sales
United States (RIAA)	Gold	500,000^{‡}
^{‡} Sales+streaming figures based on certification alone.
