= Take Your Time (Sam Hunt song) =

- Digital single cover

Single by Sam Hunt

from the album Montevallo
- Released: November 24, 2014
- Recorded: 2014
- Genre: Country; R&B
- Length: 4:02 (album version); 3:38 (radio edit)
- Label: MCA Nashville
- Songwriters: Sam Hunt; Josh Osborne; Shane McAnally
- Producers: Zach Crowell; Shane McAnally

Sam Hunt singles chronology
"Leave the Night On" (2014)	"Take Your Time" (2014)	"House Party" (2015)

Music video
- "Take Your Time" on YouTube

Radio single cover
- Radio single cover

Alternative cover
- Country radio single cover

"Take Your Time" is a song co-written and recorded by American country music singer Sam Hunt. It was released to country radio, by MCA Nashville on November 24, 2014, as the second single from his debut studio album Montevallo (2014). Capitol Records headed the song's further promotion to pop and adult pop radio stations in the spring of 2015. The song became Hunt's second consecutive single to reach number one on the Billboard Hot Country Songs chart in February 2015. The song was written by Hunt, Shane McAnally and Josh Osborne.

== Content ==
The song is a mid-tempo ballad with a "half-spoken, half-sung delivery" about a man approaching a woman and expressing a desire to know her more closely. It was written by Hunt, Josh Osborne, and Shane McAnally, and was produced by McAnally and Zach Crowell.

== Critical reception ==
Giving it an "A", Jon Freeman of Country Weekly noted the "futuristic production" and said "It's an incredibly seductive bit of songcraft, heightened by the way Sam confidently glides from his breathy speaking voice to his silky smooth, R&B-influenced vocal instrument". Billy Dukes of Taste of Country also gave the song a positive review, saying that "As a singer, the Georgia-born ex-footballer holds his own, but doesn't make any attempts to prove he's the next Ronnie Dunn. Vocally, he's more about style than power on 'Take Your Time,' a sincere ballad about meeting a beautiful woman at the bar". Website For the Country Record was less favorable, praising Hunt's vocals but criticizing the lack of a country influence.

== Music video ==
The music video was directed by Tim Mattia and premiered on March 13, 2015. The video's storyline involving domestic violence is much different than that of the song's wherein a young man wanting simply to talk to a young woman at a bar.

In the video, Hunt's character witnesses several instances of a tattooed man abusing his young girlfriend in public, including at a biker bar and a coin-operated laundry. Together, the two have a baby. Hunt and several others see the witness but do nothing. Then, near the end of the video, the woman tries to leave with her baby, when the boyfriend comes outside to stop her. When he begins hitting her, Hunt, who happens to be walking by the tattooed man's house, sees this and begins to fight with the man, keeping him occupied long enough to give the woman and her baby time to drive away and escape the relationship. Scenes of Hunt performing the song in the biker bar are also seen.

== Chart performance ==
In the United States, "Take Your Time" debuted at number 55 on the Billboard Country Airplay chart for the week of November 29, 2014. It also debuted at number 35 on the Hot Country Songs chart for the week of November 15, 2014, and peaked at number one for the week of February 21, 2015. It entered the US Billboard Hot 100 at number 93 for the week of January 17, 2015, and peaked at number 20, becoming Sam Hunt's second highest-charting single on the US Billboard Hot 100. It also debuted at number 40 on the Billboard Adult Pop Songs chart for the week of April 25, 2015. The song crossed over to additional pop formats in June, debuting at number thirty-seven on the Billboard Pop Songs chart and at number 28 on the Billboard Adult Contemporary chart, respectively, for the week of June 13, 2015. The song was certified Gold by the RIAA on March 11, 2015, Platinum status on April 14, 2015, and 2× Platinum on August 7, 2015. The song reached its two million sales mark in the US in March 2016.

The song has elsewhere charted in Belgium, Canada, Czech Republic, Lebanon, Italy, the Netherlands and Slovakia.

== Charts ==
Weekly chart performance for "Take Your Time"
Chart (2014–2016)	Peak position
Belgium (Ultratop 50 Flanders)	21
Canada Hot 100 (Billboard)	28
Canada AC (Billboard)	5
Canada Country (Billboard)	2
Canada Hot AC (Billboard)	15
Czech Republic Airplay (ČNS IFPI)	19
Czech Republic Singles Digital (ČNS IFPI)	71
Italy (FIMI)	13
Lebanon (The Official Lebanese Top 20)	9
Netherlands (Dutch Top 40)	9
Netherlands (Single Top 100)	10
Romania (Radiomonitor)	20
Slovakia Airplay (ČNS IFPI)	25
Slovakia Singles Digital (ČNS IFPI)	67
UK Singles Downloads (OCC)	90
US Billboard Hot 100	20
US Adult Contemporary (Billboard)	13
US Adult Pop Airplay (Billboard)	12
US Country Airplay (Billboard)	1
US Hot Country Songs (Billboard)	1
US Pop Airplay (Billboard)	27

Year-end chart positions for "Take Your Time"
Chart (2015)	Position
Canada (Canadian Hot 100)	33
Netherlands (Dutch Top 40)	36
Netherlands (Single Top 100)	75
UK Country (OCC)	6
US Billboard Hot 100	45
US Adult Contemporary (Billboard)	34
US Country Airplay (Billboard)	29
US Hot Country Songs (Billboard)	1
Chart (2016)	Position
Italy (FIMI)	57

Decade-end chart performance for "Take Your Time"
Chart (2010–2019)	Position
US Hot Country Songs (Billboard)	10

== Certifications ==
Certifications for "Take Your Time"
Region	Certification	Certified units/sales
Canada (Music Canada)	7× Platinum	560,000^{‡}
Italy (FIMI)	2× Platinum	100,000^{‡}
Netherlands (NVPI)	3× Platinum	90,000^{‡}
New Zealand (RMNZ)	Platinum	30,000^{‡}
United States (RIAA)	7× Platinum	7,000,000^{‡}
^{‡} Sales+streaming figures based on certification alone.

== Cover versions ==
"Take Your Time" was covered by American singer Adrian Marcel in 2015.
