= Spring Break...Checkin' Out =

Spring Break…Checkin' Out

EP by Luke Bryan
- Released: March 10, 2015
- Genre: Country
- Length: 38:06 (full version); 16:44 (5 Song version)
- Label: Capitol Nashville
- Producer: Jeff Stevens

Luke Bryan chronology
Spring Break 6...Like We Ain't Ever (2014)	Spring Break…Checkin' Out (2015)	Kill the Lights (2015)

Alternative cover
- Cover art for 5 Song version.

Spring Break...Checkin' Out is the seventh extended play (EP) from American country music artist Luke Bryan. It was released on March 10, 2015, by Capitol Nashville as the last entry in Bryan's Spring Break collection. The EP is available in a full version, featuring five new tracks ("My Ol' Bronco", "Games", "Spring Breakdown", "Checkin' Out", "You and the Beach") in addition to the six from previous EP Spring Break 6...Like We Ain't Ever (2014), or a 5-song version, featuring only the new tracks.

Two songs from the extended play — "Games" and "Spring Breakdown" — were released as promotional singles. As of March 2015, the former and latter have each sold 54,000 and 31,000 copies in the US. The album debuted in the US at number 3 on the Billboard 200 chart and at number one on the Billboard Top Country Albums chart, his fifth chart leader on the latter.

== Critical reception ==
Professional ratings
Review scores
Source	Rating
AllMusic	3/5 stars
Country Weekly	C+

Giving it 3 out of 5 stars, Stephen Thomas Erlewine of AllMusic wrote that "Sonically, the songs from the sixth and seventh EPs intertwine nicely — it's all bright and cheerful, sounding warm and open-hearted even in the shadow of the production's excessive gleam — but, appropriately enough, all the new songs find Bryan looking back over his shoulder at all the fun he's had over the years… Nevertheless, it's those five songs [from the five-song version] that provide a nice farewell to Bryan's time as the ringleader of Spring Break, and it's good to see that he's chosen to bring this era to a tidy close instead of letting it slip into memory." Bob Paxman of Country Weekly rated the album "C+", saying that "There is nothing remotely timeless about them…the songs are meant to speak to the moment, and the lyrics…reflect that." He thought that "Games" was the only song that "has any real meat to it", and praised the production, "which allows Luke plenty of space to operate."

== Track listing ==
Spring Break…Checkin' Out
No.	Title	Writer(s)	Length
1.	"My Ol' Bronco"	Luke Bryan; Jeff Stevens; Jody Stevens	3:13
2.	"Games"	Bryan; Ashley Gorley	2:56
3.	"She Get Me High"	Bryan; Jeff Stevens; Jody Stevens	3:37
4.	"Spring Breakdown"	Bryan; Gorley; Zach Crowell	3:46
5.	"Good Lookin' Girl"	Bryan; Michael Carter; Jim McCormick	3:43
6.	"Checkin' Out"	Bryan; Dallas Davidson; Rhett Akins; Ben Hayslip	3:31
7.	"You and the Beach"	Bryan; Davidson; Akins; Hayslip	3:18
8.	"Night One"	Bryan; Akins; Gorley; Hayslip	3:54
9.	"Like We Ain't Ever"	Bryan; Jay Clementi; Jason Matthews	3:18
10.	"The Sand I Brought to the Beach"	Bryan; Carter; Cole Swindell	3:26
11.	"Are You Leaving with Him"	Bryan; Jeff Stevens; Jody Stevens	3:24
Total length:			38:06

Spring Break…Checkin' Out (5 Song) EP
No.	Title	Writer(s)	Length
1.	"My Ol' Bronco"	Bryan; Jeff Stevens; Jody Stevens	3:13
2.	"Games"	Bryan; Gorley	2:56
3.	"You and the Beach"	Bryan; Davidson; Akins; Hayslip	3:18
4.	"Checkin' Out"	Bryan; Davidson; Akins; Hayslip	3:31
5.	"Spring Breakdown"	Bryan; Gorley; Crowell	3:46
Total length:			16:44

== Personnel ==
- Luke Bryan — lead vocals
- Perry Coleman — background vocals
- J.T. Corenflos — acoustic guitar, electric guitar
- Kenny Greenberg — acoustic guitar, electric guitar
- Greg Morrow — drums, drum loops, percussion
- Danny Radar — banjo, bouzouki, acoustic guitar
- Mike Rojas — Hammond B-3 organ, piano, synthesizer
- Jimmie Lee Sloas — bass guitar
- Jeff Stevens — acoustic guitar, electric guitar, gut string guitar, background vocals, producer
- Jody Stevens — programming, synthesizer
- Ilya Toshinsky — acoustic guitar, guitjo

== Chart performance ==
Spring Break…Checkin' Out debuted at number 3 on the Billboard 200 chart and at number one on the Billboard Top Country Albums charts for the week ending of March 28, 2015, with 88,000 copies sold, or 106,000 units, including track and streaming equivalent albums. The album has sold 245,800 copies as of July 2015.

=== Weekly charts ===
Chart (2015)	Peak position
Australian Albums (ARIA)	16
Canadian Albums (Billboard)	2
US Billboard 200	3
US Top Country Albums (Billboard)	1

=== Year-end charts ===
Chart (2015)	Position
US Billboard 200	88
US Top Country Albums (Billboard)	13

== Certifications ==
Region	Certification	Certified units/sales
United States (RIAA)	Gold	500,000^{‡}
^{‡} Sales+streaming figures based on certification alone.
