= House Party (Sam Hunt song) =

Single by Sam Hunt

from the album Montevallo
- Released: June 1, 2015
- Recorded: 2014
- Genre: Country; country pop; pop rock
- Length: 3:10
- Label: MCA Nashville
- Songwriters: Sam Hunt; Zach Crowell; Jerry Flowers
- Producers: Zach Crowell; Shane McAnally

Sam Hunt singles chronology
"Take Your Time" (2014)	"House Party" (2015)	"Break Up in a Small Town" (2015)

Music videos
- "House Party" (alternate video) on YouTube
- "House Party" (official music video) on YouTube

"House Party" is a song co-written and recorded by American country music singer Sam Hunt. It was released to country radio, by MCA Nashville on June 1, 2015 as the third single from his debut studio album Montevallo (2014). The song was written by Hunt, Zach Crowell and Jerry Flowers.

== Critical reception ==
Taste of Country reviewed the song favorably, saying "This singer continues to stretch the genre to the delight of some and the agony of others. Acoustic guitar drives the beat in 'House Party', while a very country-sounding guitar lick works around his melodic, syncopated lyrics. This is Hunt's lightest single to date, as well".

== Commercial performance ==
The song first charted on the Country Digital Songs chart at number 31 for the week of August 20, 2014, the week his EP X2C was released, selling 12,000 copies in the US. It re-entered on the chart at number 29 for the week of May 23, 2015, preceding its official release as a single with sales of 10,000. It entered the Hot Country Songs chart on the next week at number 31. It first entered the Country Airplay chart for the week of January 2015, but gained traction in May in anticipation of its release as a single. It entered the US Billboard Hot 100 at number 85 for the week of June 20, 2015. The song reached number one on the Hot Country Songs chart for the week of August 22, 2015, becoming the third number one song from his debut studio album on that chart. It peaked at number 26 on the US Billboard Hot 100 two weeks later. The song was certified Platinum by the RIAA on August 28, 2015, and it reached its million sales mark in the US by January 2016. As of February 2016, the song has sold 1,121,000 copies in the US.

== Music videos ==
Two music videos were produced for the song. The first music video, directed by Brad Belanger and Steven Worster, premiered in August 2014. A second music video, directed by Justin Key and Steven Worster, premiered in June 2015.

== Charts ==
=== Weekly charts ===
Chart (2015)	Peak position
Canada Hot 100 (Billboard)	34
Canada Country (Billboard)	2
Czech Republic Singles Digital (ČNS IFPI)	78
Slovakia Singles Digital (ČNS IFPI)	85
US Billboard Hot 100	26
US Country Airplay (Billboard)	1
US Hot Country Songs (Billboard)	1

=== Year-end charts ===
Chart (2015)	Position
Canada (Canadian Hot 100)	92
US Billboard Hot 100	85
US Country Airplay (Billboard)	32
US Hot Country Songs (Billboard)	3

== Certifications and sales ==
Region	Certification	Certified units/sales
Canada (Music Canada)	6× Platinum	480,000^{‡}
New Zealand (RMNZ)	Gold	15,000^{‡}
United States (RIAA)	6× Platinum	6,000,000^{‡}
^{‡} Sales+streaming figures based on certification alone.
