= Montevallo (album) =

Studio album by Sam Hunt
- Released: October 27, 2014
- Recorded: 2013–2014
- Genres: Country pop; R&B
- Length: 38:19
- Label: MCA Nashville
- Producers: Zach Crowell; Shane McAnally

Sam Hunt chronology
X2C (2014)	Montevallo (2014)	Southside (2020)

Singles from Montevallo
- 1. "Leave the Night On" Released: June 16, 2014; 2. "Take Your Time" Released: November 24, 2014; 3. "House Party" Released: June 1, 2015; 4. "Break Up in a Small Town" Released: September 21, 2015; 5. "Make You Miss Me" Released: March 7, 2016

Montevallo is the debut studio album by American country music singer Sam Hunt. It was released on October 27, 2014, by MCA Nashville. Hunt co-wrote all 10 tracks on the album. The album was produced by Zach Crowell and Shane McAnally. "Cop Car" was previously recorded by Keith Urban on his eighth studio album Fuse, who released it as a single in January 2014.

In 2015, Montevallo was nominated for Best Country Album at the 58th Annual Grammy Awards. It won the 2016 American Country Countdown Awards for Digital Album of the Year.

== Background ==
The album's name is a nod to the town of Montevallo, Alabama, the hometown of Hunt's wife, Hannah Lee Fowler. He played football for the UAB Blazers and met Hannah during his time in Birmingham. Hunt moved to Nashville in 2008 but continued to date his girlfriend on and off. Fowler and Hunt married in Georgia in 2017. Many of the songs on the album are inspired by their relationship challenges.

== Singles ==
"Leave the Night On" was released as the lead single from the album on June 16, 2014. The song peaked at number one on both the Hot Country Songs chart and the Country Airplay chart, as well as peaking at number 30 on the US Billboard Hot 100. It has been certified Platinum by the RIAA. As of February 2015, it has sold 1,002,000 copies in the US.

"Take Your Time" was released as the second single from the album on November 24, 2014. The song became Hunt's most successful single up to that time, crossing over to pop and adult contemporary formats, peaking at number 20 on the US Billboard Hot 100, as well as topping both Hot Country Songs chart and Country Airplay chart. It topped the year-end charts on the Hot Country Songs chart in 2015. It has been certified 2× Platinum by the RIAA. As of March 2016, it has sold 2,001,000 copies in the US.

"House Party" was released as the third single from the album on June 1, 2015. Like the previous singles, "House Party" also reached number one on both Hot Country Songs chart and Country Airplay chart. It peaked at number 26 on the US Billboard Hot 100. The song has been certified Platinum by the RIAA. As of February 2016, it has sold 1,121,000 copies in the US.

"Break Up in a Small Town" was released as the fourth single from the album on September 21, 2015. It peaked at number 29 on the US Billboard Hot 100 and became Hunt's first single to miss the top spot on the Hot Country Songs chart and the Country Airplay chart, peaking at number two on both charts. It has been certified Platinum by the RIAA. As of March 2016, it has sold 1,230,000 copies in the US.

"Make You Miss Me" was released as the fifth single from the album on March 7, 2016. It topped the Country Airplay chart, making Hunt the first solo male artist to land four number ones on the Country Airplay chart from a debut studio album. It peaked at number two on the Hot Country Songs chart and at number 45 on the US Billboard Hot 100. As of September 2016, it has sold 607,000 copies in the US.

== Critical reception ==
Professional ratings
Review scores
Source	Rating
AllMusic	3.5/5 stars
Billboard	4/5 stars
PopMatters	6/10 discs
Vice (Expert Witness)	(1-star Honorable Mention)

Upon release, Montevallo received positive reviews from contemporary music critics, and drew heavy attention to Hunt's incorporation of hip-hop, R&B, and pop music elements into the project. At Album of the Year, which assigns a normalized rating out of 100 to reviews from mainstream publications, the album received an average score of 70 based on 3 reviews. Elias Leight from Billboard provided a favorable review, describing "eighty percent of this album could compete easily in the top 40", and stated the album "comes from a guy with a hit on the country charts, but has little to identify it as country". Stephen Thomas Erlewine of AllMusic rated the album 3.5 out of 5, saying that "Hunt is unabashedly a modern guy and his taste for busy electronic arrangements and facility with fleet-footed rhythms distinguish him from the pack of modern country bros...What grounds the album is his clean, commercial songwriting, heavy on hooks but also sturdily constructed. Ultimately, Hunt's ability to fuse his classical construction with modern flair and pass it off as no big thing is what makes his debut something more than just another album from the bro next door". Writing for Vice, Robert Christgau cited "Take Your Time" and "Cop Car" as highlights and summarized the album with the following: "Popmeister from a small town hooks women for a living, defies cops for show".

== Commercial performance ==
The album debuted on the US Billboard 200 at number three and on the Top Country Albums chart at number one, with 70,000 sold for the week. The lead single from the album, "Leave the Night On" also reached number one at the same time on the Hot Country Songs and Country Airplay charts, which made Sam Hunt the first country artist in 22 years to reach the top of three country charts simultaneously since Billy Ray Cyrus. Montevallo topped the Top Country Albums chart for nine non-consecutive weeks. The album was certified Gold by the RIAA on April 14, 2015, and 2× Platinum on February 1, 2016. The album reached over a million in sales in the US by February 2016. As of April 2017, the album has sold 1,292,400 copies in the US.

For the year-end charts of 2015, Montevallo was ranked at number one on the Top Country Albums chart and at number 11 on the US Billboard 200.

== Track listing ==
No.	Title	Writer(s)	Length
1.	"Take Your Time"	Sam Hunt; Josh Osborne; Shane McAnally	4:02
2.	"Leave the Night On"	Hunt; Osborne; McAnally	3:12
3.	"House Party"	Hunt; Zach Crowell; Jerry Flowers	3:10
4.	"Break Up in a Small Town"	Hunt; Crowell; McAnally	3:49
5.	"Single for the Summer"	Hunt; Crowell; Osborne; McAnally	5:10
6.	"Ex to See"	Hunt; Osborne; Matthew Ramsey	3:18
7.	"Make You Miss Me"	Hunt; Osborne; Ramsey	3:45
8.	"Cop Car"	Hunt; Crowell; Matt Jenkins	4:13
9.	"Raised on It"	Hunt; Crowell; Flowers	3:55
10.	"Speakers"	Hunt; Kylie Sackley; Brandon Hood	3:46

== Personnel ==
Mix engineers

- Zach Crowell – "House Party", "Cop Car", "Single for the Summer", "Make You Miss Me", "Speakers"
- Billy Decker – "Leave the Night On", "Raised on It"
- Ryan Gore – "Take Your Time"
- Reid Shippen – "Break Up in a Small Town", "Ex to See"

Musicians

- Sam Hunt – lead vocals, acoustic guitar, ganjo, piano
- Josh Burkett – electric guitar
- Tyrone Carreker – electric guitar, background vocals
- Joshua Sales – drums
- Chad Cromwell – drums
- Zach Crowell – programming, acoustic guitar, electric guitar, bass guitar, ganjo, piano, keyboards, background vocals
- David Davidson – violin, viola
- Mike Durham – electric guitar
- Fred Eltringham – drums
- Ian Fitchuk – piano, drums
- Jerry Flowers – bass guitar, acoustic guitar, ganjo
- Mickey Guyton – background vocals
- Hillary Lindsey – background vocals
- Shane McAnally – background vocals
- Chris McHugh – drums
- Rob McNelly – electric guitar
- Devin Malone – electric guitar, acoustic guitar, mandolin, pedal steel guitar, dobro
- Josh Osborne – background vocals
- Scotty Sanders – pedal steel guitar
- Jimmie Lee Sloas – bass guitar
- Matt Stanfield – piano, keyboards, organ
- Ilya Toshinsky – acoustic guitar, ganjo, mandolin

Production

- Brad Belanger – cover photo
- Kenley Flynn – production coordination
- Andrew Mendelson – mastering engineer
- Karen Naff – design
- Stephanie Wright – A&R

== Charts ==
=== Weekly charts ===
Chart (2014–2016)	Peak position
Australian Country Albums (ARIA)	4
Belgian Albums (Ultratop Flanders)	167
Canadian Albums (Billboard)	2
Dutch Albums (Album Top 100)	60
Italian Albums (FIMI)	83
New Zealand Heatseeker Albums (RMNZ)	7
Scottish Albums (Official Charts)	50
UK Albums (Official Charts)	93
UK Country Albums (Official Charts)	6
US Billboard 200	3
US Top Country Albums (Billboard)	1

=== Year-end charts ===
Chart (2014)	Position
US Billboard 200	184
US Top Country Albums (Billboard)	40
Chart (2015)	Position
Australian Country Albums (ARIA)	39
US Billboard 200	11
US Top Country Albums (Billboard)	1
Chart (2016)	Position
Canadian Albums (Billboard)	21
US Billboard 200	19
US Top Country Albums (Billboard)	5
Chart (2017)	Position
Australian Country Albums (ARIA)	14
US Billboard 200	54
US Top Country Albums (Billboard)	8
Chart (2018)	Position
Australian Country Albums (ARIA)	23
US Billboard 200	103
US Top Country Albums (Billboard)	12
Chart (2019)	Position
Australian Country Albums (ARIA)	37
US Top Country Albums (Billboard)	23
Chart (2020)	Position
Australian Country Albums (ARIA)	50
US Top Country Albums (Billboard)	28
Chart (2021)	Position
Australian Country Albums (ARIA)	37
US Top Country Albums (Billboard)	85

=== Decade-end charts ===
Chart (2010–2019)	Position
US Billboard 200	47
US Top Country Albums (Billboard)	2

== Certifications ==
Region	Certification	Certified units/sales
Canada (Music Canada)	4× Platinum	320,000^{‡}
New Zealand (RMNZ)	Platinum	15,000^{‡}
United States (RIAA)	4× Platinum	4,000,000^{‡} / 1,292,400
^{‡} Sales+streaming figures based on certification alone.
