= Save It for a Rainy Day (Kenny Chesney song) =

Single by Kenny Chesney

from the album The Big Revival
- Released: June 29, 2015
- Recorded: 2014
- Genre: Country
- Length: 3:02
- Label: Blue Chair; Columbia Nashville
- Songwriters: Andrew Dorff; Matthew Ramsey; Brad Tursi
- Producers: Buddy Cannon; Kenny Chesney

Kenny Chesney singles chronology
"Wild Child" (2015)	"Save It for a Rainy Day" (2015)	"Noise" (2016)

"Save It for a Rainy Day" is a song written by Andrew Dorff, Matthew Ramsey and Brad Tursi, and recorded by American country music artist Kenny Chesney. It was released in June 2015 as the fourth and final single from Chesney’s 2014 album The Big Revival.

== Critical reception ==
The song received a positive review from Taste of Country, who wrote that "So many of the songs on The Big Revival recall memories of Chesney’s biggest hits without feeling like duplicates. Add “Save It for a Rainy Day” to the list. As he reaches for a fourth straight No. 1 it’s difficult to argue this isn’t his best album since Just Who I Am: Poets & Pirates."

== Music video ==
The music video was directed by Shaun Silva and premiered in July 2015.

== Chart performance ==
The song has sold 259,000 copies in the US as of November 2015.

=== Weekly charts ===
Chart (2015)	Peak position
Canada Hot 100 (Billboard)	61
Canada Country (Billboard)	1
US Billboard Hot 100	54
US Country Airplay (Billboard)	1
US Hot Country Songs (Billboard)	4

=== Year-end charts ===
Chart (2015)	Position
US Country Airplay (Billboard)	12
US Hot Country Songs (Billboard)	26

== Certifications ==
Region	Certification	Certified units/sales
United States (RIAA)	Platinum	1,000,000^{‡}
^{‡} Sales+streaming figures based on certification alone.
