= Til It's Gone =

Single by Kenny Chesney

from the album The Big Revival
- Released: October 13, 2014
- Recorded: 2014
- Genre: Country
- Length: 4:11 (album version); 3:00 (radio edit)
- Label: Blue Chair; Columbia Nashville
- Songwriter(s): Rodney Clawson; David Lee Murphy; Jimmy Yeary
- Producer(s): Buddy Cannon; Kenny Chesney

Kenny Chesney singles chronology
| "American Kids" (2014) | "Til It's Gone" (2014) | "Wild Child" (2015) |

"Til It's Gone" is a song written by Rodney Clawson, David Lee Murphy, and Jimmy Yeary and recorded by American country music artist Kenny Chesney. It was released in October 2014 as the second single from Chesney’s 2014 album The Big Revival.

== Critical reception ==
The song received a favorable review from Taste of Country, which said that "the lines are sharp and catchy and roll off the Tennessee native’s tongue like a great pickup line" and it is "a song that could be found on so many of Chesney’s previous records, yet it still sounds fresh for today."

== Music video ==
The music video was directed by Don Carr and was premiered in October 2014. It was taken from CMT Instant Jam, filmed live at the Georgia Theatre in Athens, Georgia.

== Chart performance ==
"Til It's Gone" debuted at number 40 on the U.S. Billboard Country Airplay chart for the week of October 11, 2014. It also debuted at number 48 on the U.S. Billboard Hot Country Songs chart for the week of October 18, 2014.

=== Weekly charts ===
| Chart (2014–2015) | Peak position |
|---|---|
| Canada (Canadian Hot 100) | 75 |
| Canada Country (Billboard) | 1 |
| US Billboard Hot 100 | 60 |
| US Country Airplay (Billboard) | 1 |
| US Hot Country Songs (Billboard) | 8 |

=== Year-end charts ===
| Chart (2014) | Position |
|---|---|
| US Country Airplay (Billboard) | 89 |

| Chart (2015) | Position |
|---|---|
| US Country Airplay (Billboard) | 50 |
| US Hot Country Songs (Billboard) | 69 |

== Certifications ==
| Region | Certification | Certified units/sales |
|---|---|---|
| United States (RIAA) | Gold | 500,000^{‡} |
^{‡} Sales+streaming figures based on certification alone.
