= Spring Break 6...Like We Ain't Ever =

Spring Break 6…Like We Ain't Ever

EP by Luke Bryan
- Released: March 11, 2014
- Genre: Country
- Length: 21:25
- Label: Capitol Nashville
- Producer: Jeff Stevens

Luke Bryan chronology
Crash My Party (2013)	Spring Break 6…Like We Ain't Ever (2014)	Spring Break...Checkin' Out (2015)

Spring Break 6…Like We Ain't Ever is the sixth extended play (EP) by American country music artist Luke Bryan. It was released on March 11, 2014 by Capitol Nashville as a follow up to Bryan's first four Spring Break EPs and the 2013 compilation album Spring Break...Here to Party.

The EP features six original songs co-written by Bryan. A music video was filmed for "She Get Me High".

== Critical reception ==
Professional ratings
Review scores
Source	Rating
Roughstock	4/5 stars
AllMusic	3/5 stars

Matt Bjorke of Roughstock gave the EP four stars out of five, calling it "a smart, fun collection of songs which no doubt is appreciated by his core audience." Bjorke felt that "any of these songs could’ve been part of his albums if not reserved for the annual EPs."

== Track listing ==
No.	Title	Writer(s)	Length
1.	"She Get Me High"	Luke Bryan; Jeff Stevens; Jody Stevens	3:37
2.	"Like We Ain't Ever"	Bryan; Jay Clementi; Jason Matthews	3:18
3.	"Night One"	Bryan; Rhett Akins; Ashley Gorley; Ben Hayslip	3:54
4.	"Are You Leaving with Him"	Bryan; Jeff Stevens; Jody Stevens	3:24
5.	"Good Lookin' Girl"	Bryan; Michael Carter; Jim McCormick	3:43
6.	"The Sand I Brought to the Beach"	Bryan; Carter; Cole Swindell	3:29
Total length:			21:25

== Chart performance ==
Spring Break 6…Like We Ain't Ever debuted at number 2 on the U.S. Billboard 200 chart and at number one on the U.S. Billboard Top Country Albums chart, selling 74,000 copies in its first week of release.

=== Weekly charts ===
Chart (2014)	Peak position
Canadian Albums (Billboard)	2
US Billboard 200	2
US Top Country Albums (Billboard)	1

=== Year-end charts ===
Chart (2014)	Position
US Billboard 200	164
US Top Country Albums (Billboard)	35
