= Dustin Lynch discography =

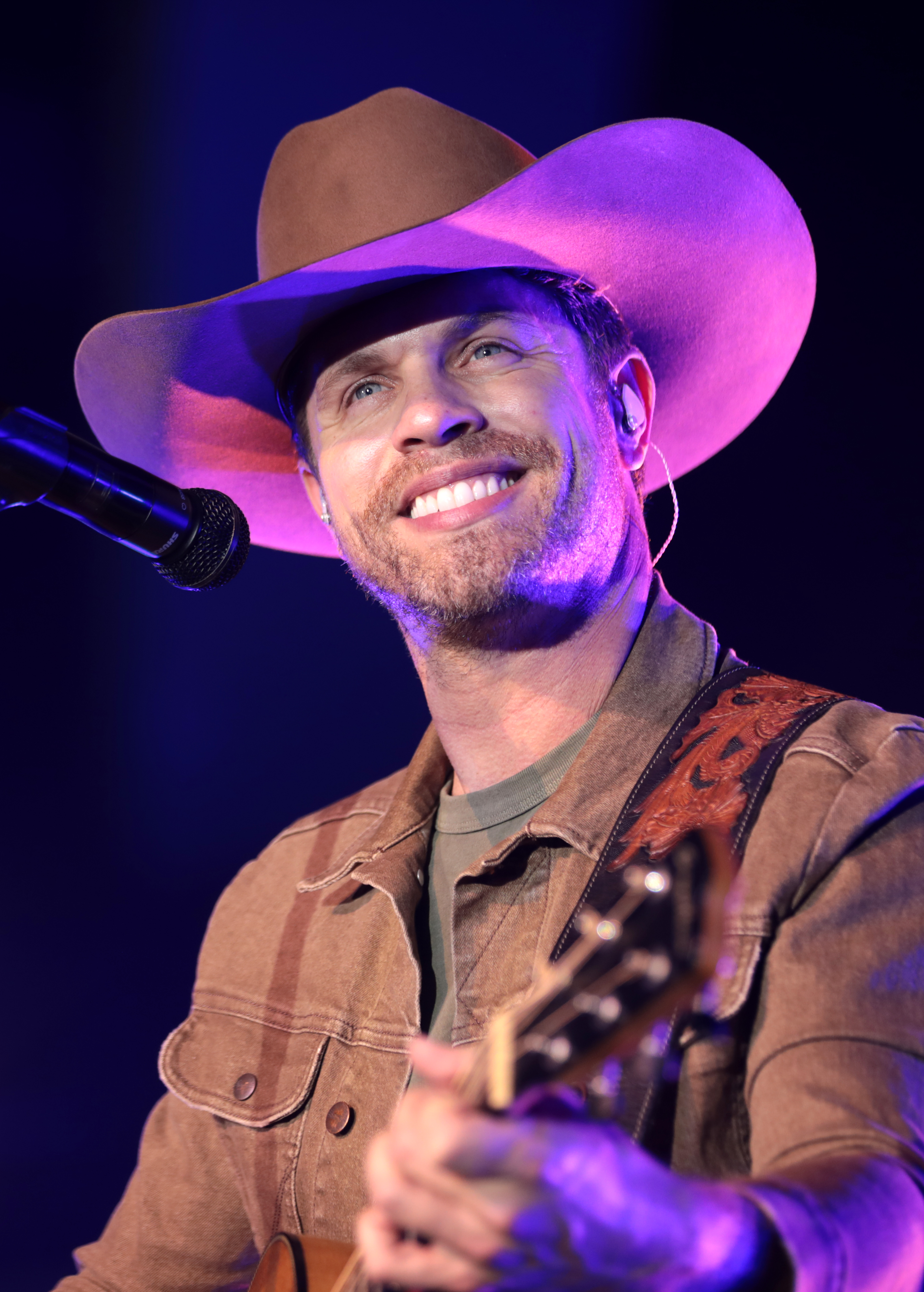
- Studio albums: 7
- EPs: 1
- Singles: 18
- Music videos: 20
- No. 1 singles: 9

American country music artist Dustin Lynch has released seven studio albums, one extended play, twenty music videos, and eighteen singles, of which nine have reached number one on Country Airplay. He first charted a number one single with "Where It's At".

== Studio albums ==
| Title | Details | Peak chart positions | | | | | Sales |
| Title | Details | US | US Country | US Indie | AUS | CAN | Sales |
|---|---|---|---|---|---|---|---|
| Dustin Lynch | Release date: August 21, 2012; Label: Broken Bow; Formats: CD, digital download | 13 | 1 | 1 | — | — | US: 100,000 |
| Where It's At | Release date: September 9, 2014; Label: Broken Bow; Formats: CD, digital download | 8 | 2 | 3 | — | 23 | US: 138,700 |
| Current Mood | Release date: September 8, 2017; Label: Broken Bow; Formats: CD, digital download | 7 | 2 | 3 | 34 | 25 | US: 79,800 |
| Tullahoma | Release date: January 17, 2020; Label: Broken Bow; Formats: CD, digital download, streaming | 38 | 4 | 2 | — | 53 | US: 13,500 |
| Blue in the Sky | Release date: February 11, 2022; Label: Broken Bow; Formats: CD, digital download, streaming | 125 | 9 | 17 | — | — | |
| Killed the Cowboy | Release date: September 29, 2023; Label: Broken Bow; Formats: CD, digital download, streaming | — | 47 | — | — | — | |
| Clean Slate | Released: October 30, 2026; Label: Broken Bow; Formats: CD, digital download, streaming | — | — | — | — | — | |
"—" denotes releases that did not chart.

== Extended plays ==
| Title | Details |
|---|---|
| Ridin' Roads | Release date: March 9, 2019; Label: Broken Bow |

== Singles ==
=== As lead artist ===
| Year | Title | Peak chart positions | | | | | Sales | Certifications | Album |
| Year | Title | US | US Country | US Country Airplay | CAN | CAN Country | Sales | Certifications | Album |
|---|---|---|---|---|---|---|---|---|---|
| 2012 | "Cowboys and Angels" | 40 | 2 | 2 | 64 | 5 | US: 952,000 | RIAA: Platinum | Dustin Lynch |
| 2012 | "She Cranks My Tractor" | — (Note: "She Cranks My Tractor" did not enter the Billboard Hot 100, but peaked at number 1 on the Bubbling Under Hot 100 chart.) | 29 | 16 | — | 37 | | | Dustin Lynch |
| 2013 | "Wild in Your Smile" | — | 32 | 23 | — | — | | | Dustin Lynch |
| 2014 | "Where It's At" | 42 | 4 | 1 | 67 | 4 | US: 598,000 | RIAA: Platinum | Where It's At |
| 2014 | "Hell of a Night" | 55 | 7 | 1 | 95 | 8 | US: 295,000 | RIAA: Gold | Where It's At |
| 2015 | "Mind Reader" | 57 | 8 | 1 | — | 8 | US: 271,000 | RIAA: Gold | Where It's At |
| 2016 | "Seein' Red" | 55 | 5 | 1 | — | 4 | US: 213,000 | RIAA: Gold; MC: Gold | Current Mood |
| 2017 | "Small Town Boy" | 36 | 2 | 1 | 69 | 1 | US: 497,000 | RIAA: 5× Platinum; MC: Platinum; RMNZ: Gold | Current Mood |
| 2017 | "I'd Be Jealous Too" | — | 27 | 34 | — | — | | RIAA: Platinum | Current Mood |
| 2018 | "Good Girl" | 44 | 8 | 1 | — | 5 | US: 83,000 | RIAA: Platinum; MC: Gold | Tullahoma |
| 2019 | "Ridin' Roads" | 47 | 5 | 1 | — | 11 | US: 82,000 | RIAA: 2× Platinum | Tullahoma |
| 2020 | "Momma's House" | 59 | 8 | 5 | — | 35 | | RIAA: Gold | Tullahoma |
| 2020 | "Red Dirt, Blue Eyes" (Note: "Red Dirt, Blue Eyes" has been released as a single in Australia only.) | — | — | — | — | — | | | Tullahoma |
| 2021 | "Thinking 'Bout You" (featuring Lauren Alaina or MacKenzie Porter) (Note: Lauren Alaina is featured only on the Tullahoma album version of "Thinking 'Bout You"; the radio version features MacKenzie Porter, which is also a single on the album Blue in the Sky. This song is credited on the charts as "Dustin Lynch featuring Lauren Alaina or MacKenzie Porter".) | 30 | 2 | 1 | 46 | 2 | | RIAA: 4× Platinum; MC: 2× Platinum; RMNZ: Gold | Tullahoma (and Blue in the Sky) (Note: "Thinking 'Bout You" was originally issued as the fifth single from Tullahoma. The radio single version, featuring MacKenzie Porter, would become the lead single to the album Blue in the Sky.) |
| 2022 | "Party Mode" | — (Note: "Party Mode" did not enter the Billboard Hot 100, but peaked at number 21 on the Bubbling Under Hot 100 chart.) | 30 | 17 | — | 48 | | | Blue in the Sky |
| 2023 | "Stars Like Confetti" | 81 | 13 | 2 | 83 | 2 | | | Blue in the Sky |
| 2023 | "Chevrolet" (featuring Jelly Roll) | 50 | 15 | 1 | 60 | 1 | | RIAA: Platinum | Killed the Cowboy |
| 2025 | "Easy to Love" | — | — | 22 | — | 55 | | | Clean Slate |
| 2026 | "Die Living" (with Illenium and David Guetta) | — | — | — | — | — | | | Non-album single |

=== As featured artist ===
| Year | Title | Peak chart positions | Certifications | Album |
| Year | Title | CAN Country | Certifications | Album |
|---|---|---|---|---|
| 2024 | "Broken Heart Thing" (Madeline Merlo featuring Dustin Lynch) | 9 | MC: Gold | One House Down (from the Girl Next Door) |

== Other charted songs ==
| Year | Song | Peak chart positions | Sales | Album |
| Year | Song | US Country | Sales | Album |
|---|---|---|---|---|
| 2017 | "Love Me or Leave Me Alone" | 31 | US: 42,000 | Current Mood |

== Music videos ==
| Year | Video | Director |
|---|---|---|
| 2012 | "Cowboys and Angels" (acoustic) | Jessica Wardwell |
| 2012 | "Cowboys and Angels" | Peter Zavadil |
| 2012 | "She Cranks My Tractor" | Wes Edwards |
| 2014 | "Where It's At (Yep, Yep)" | Shane Drake |
| 2015 | "Hell of a Night" | Michael Monaco |
| 2016 | "Mind Reader" | Mason Dixon |
| 2016 | "Seein' Red" | Adam Rothlein |
| 2017 | "Small Town Boy" | Chris Hicky |
| 2018 | "Good Girl" | Mason Dixon |
| 2019 | "Ridin' Roads" | Mason Dixon |
| 2021 | "Thinking 'Bout You" (featuring Mackenzie Porter) | Justin Nolan Key |
| 2021 | "Tequila on a Boat" (featuring Chris Lane) | Mason Dixon |
| 2021 | "Not Every Cowboy" | Matthew Paskert |
| 2021 | "Pasadena" | Matthew Paskert |
| 2021 | "Huntin' Land" (featuring Riley Green) | Matthew Paskert |
| 2022 | "Party Mode" | Mason Dixon |
| 2023 | "Stars Like Confetti" | Chris Hicky |
| 2023 | "Chevrolet" (featuring Jelly Roll) | Mason Dixon |
| 2023 | "Killed the Cowboy" | Mason Dixon |
| 2025 | "Easy to Love" | Jack Owens |
| 2026 | "Clean Slate" | n/a |
