= Where It's At =

Where It's At may refer to:

== Music ==
- Where It's At (Charles Kynard album), 1963
- Where It's At, 1966 live album recorded at the Cheetah, New York by Mike St. Shaw and the Prophets
- Where It's At, album by The Holmes Brothers 1991
- Where It's At (Dustin Lynch album), 2014
- "Where It's At" (Beck song), 1996
- "Where It's At" (Dustin Lynch song), 2014
- "Where It's At" (Joey Badass song), 2012

== Other ==
- Where It's At (film), a Garson Kanin film 1969
- Where It's At (TV series), Canadian television series presenting musical performances and broadcast during 1968–1969

== See also ==
- That's Where It's At, a 1962 jazz record album by Stanley Turrentine
- That's Where It's At!, a 1969 album by John Lee Hooker
- "That's Where It's At" (song), a 1964 song written & recorded by Sam Cooke
