= Easy to Love (Dustin Lynch song) =

Single by Dustin Lynch

from the album Clean Slate
- Released: May 30, 2025
- Genre: Country
- Length: 2:44
- Label: BBR
- Songwriters: Ben Johnson; Dustin Lynch; Jon Robert Hall; Hunter Phelps; Zach Crowell
- Producer: Zach Crowell

Dustin Lynch singles chronology
"Chevrolet" (2023)	"Easy to Love" (2025)	"Die Living" (2026)

"Easy to Love" is a song by American country music singer Dustin Lynch. It was released on May 30, 2025. as the lead single from his seventh studio album Clean Slate. The song was written by Ben Johnson, Lynch, Jon Robert Hall, Hunter Phelps and Zach Crowell.

== Content ==
According to a press release, Lynch claimed that "is the first to admit he’s stubborn, restless, and tough to pin down when it comes to matters of the heart," lyrics that confess Lynch's "runaway habits, though he remains open to relationships" he said: "I'm still thinkin' maybe one day I'll find her, they always say when you know, you know, If I know me, she’ll be my next right turn, but I'll take a left just to see where it goes".

== Music video ==
The music video directed by Jack Owens, It was filmed in Key West, Florida.

== Charts ==
Chart performance for "Easy to Love"
Chart (2025–2026)	Peak position
Canada Country (Billboard)	55
US Country Airplay (Billboard)	22
