= Tullahoma (album) =

Studio album by Dustin Lynch
- Released: January 17, 2020
- Studio: Sound Stage, Nashville; Ocean Way, Nashville
- Genre: Country
- Length: 35:39
- Label: Broken Bow
- Producer: Zach Crowell

Dustin Lynch chronology
Current Mood (2017)	Tullahoma (2020)	Blue in the Sky (2022)

Singles from Tullahoma
- 1. "Good Girl" Released: May 21, 2018; 2. "Ridin' Roads" Released: March 25, 2019; 3. "Momma's House" Released: February 3, 2020; 4. "Red Dirt, Blue Eyes" Released: March 30, 2020 (Note: "Red Dirt, Blue Eyes" has been released as a single in Australia only.); 5. "Thinking 'Bout You" Released: May 3, 2021

Tullahoma is the fourth studio album by American country music singer Dustin Lynch. It was released on January 17, 2020, by Broken Bow Records. The album was produced by Zach Crowell and includes the singles "Good Girl", "Ridin' Roads", and "Momma's House".

== Content ==
Prior to the album's release, Lynch released the singles "Good Girl" and "Ridin' Roads". The latter appeared on an EP of the same name, also including the tracks "Little Town Livin'" and "Red Dirt Blue Eyes", both of which also appear on Tullahoma. Lynch co-produced the album with Zach Crowell. Both are also contributing songwriters to the project, along with Old Dominion lead singer Matthew Ramsey, Brian Kelley of Florida Georgia Line, Rhett Akins, Dallas Davidson, Luke Laird, Dylan Schneider, and busbee. The album name comes from Lynch's hometown of Tullahoma, Tennessee.

== Critical reception ==
Professional ratings
Review scores
Source	Rating
AllMusic	3/5 stars

AllMusic's Stephen Thomas Erlewine commended Lynch for utilizing the groove he used on Current Mood to make the record a more breezy and personal affair but noted that his "unrepentant cheerfulness" makes it difficult for listeners to tell what he's singing about, concluding that, "Some could call this tonal consistency, but the adherence to the middle of the road makes Tullahoma not much more than finely crafted background music."

== Commercial performance ==
Tullahoma debuted at number four on Billboard's Top Country Albums with 16,000 album-equivalent units units, 7,000 of which are in traditional album sales. As of March 2020, it has sold 13,500 copies in the United States, and 221,000 in consumed units.

== Track listing ==
Tullahoma track listing
No.	Title	Writer(s)	Length
1.	"Momma's House"	Dylan Schneider; Michael Lotten; Rodney Clawson; Justin Wilson	3:40
2.	"Dirt Road"	Rhett Akins; Ben Hayslip; David Garcia	3:22
3.	"Thinking 'Bout You" (featuring Lauren Alaina)	Dustin Lynch; Andy Albert; Hunter Phelps; Will Weatherly	2:50
4.	"Ridin' Roads"	Lynch; Ashley Gorley; Zach Crowell	3:25
5.	"Old Country Song"	Josh Miller; Bryan Simpson; Josh Jenkins	2:55
6.	"The World Ain't Yours and Mine"	Matthew Ramsey; Luke Laird; Clawson	3:25
7.	"Country Star"	Lynch; Brian Kelley; Corey Crowder; Jordan Schmidt	3:15
8.	"Workin' On You"	busbee; Ashley Gorley; Akins	3:07
9.	"Little Town Livin'"	Lynch; Ben Hayslip; Zach Crowell; Akins	3:15
10.	"Red Dirt, Blue Eyes"	Lynch; Kyle Fishman; Dallas Davidson	3:17
11.	"Good Girl"	Lynch; Justin Ebach; Albert	3:08
Total length:			35:39

== Personnel ==
Adapted from the Tullahoma media notes.

Vocals

- Lauren Alaina – featured vocals (track 3)
- Sarah Buxton – background vocals
- Ben Caver – background vocals
- Zach Crowell – background vocals
- Justin Ebach – background vocals
- Dustin Lynch – lead vocals
- Matt Ramsey – background vocals
- Bryan Simpson – background vocals
- Russell Terrell – background vocals

Instrumentation

- Zach Crowell – bass guitar, electric guitar, keyboards, programming
- Justin Ebach – acoustic guitar, programming
- David Garcia – keyboards, programming
- Josh Jenkins – programming
- Luke Laird – acoustic guitar
- Michael Lotten – keyboards
- Devin Malone – acoustic guitar, electric guitar, mandolin, pedal steel guitar
- Josh Matheny – dobro, acoustic guitar
- Sol Philcox-Littlefield – acoustic guitar, electric guitar
- Joshua Sales – drums
- Scotty Sanders – dobro, lap steel guitar, pedal steel guitar
- Jimmie Lee Sloas – bass guitar
- Aaron Sterling – drums
- Ilya Toshinsky – banjo, bouzouki, acoustic guitar
- Will Weatherly – acoustic guitar, programming
- Derek Wells – electric guitar
- Nir Z. – drums

Technical

- Zach Crowell – producer, engineer (2, 6, 9, 11), mixing (11)
- Jim Cooley – engineer (3, 5, 7, 8), mixing
- Josh Ditty – engineer (1, 4, 10)
- Billy Decker – mixing (4, 10)
- Joel McKenney – assistant engineer
- Ryan Yount – assistant engineer
- Andrew Mendelson – mastering
- Scott Johnson – production assistance

Imagery

- Connor Dwyer – photography
- Daniel Vorlet – photography
- Cherie Kilchrist – wardrobe stylist
- Sharla Pruitt-Higgins – hair and make-up artist
- Brad Hersh – artwork, package design

== Charts ==
=== Weekly charts ===
Weekly chart performance for Tullahoma
Chart (2020)	Peak position
Australian Digital Albums (ARIA)	6
Canadian Albums (Billboard)	53
US Billboard 200	38
US Top Country Albums (Billboard)	4
US Independent Albums (Billboard)	2

=== Year-end charts ===
Year-end chart performance for Tullahoma in 2020
Chart (2020)	Position
US Top Country Albums (Billboard)	50

Year-end chart performance for Tullahoma in 2021
Chart (2021)	Position
US Top Country Albums (Billboard)	70

Year-end chart performance for Tullahoma in 2022
Chart (2022)	Position
US Top Country Albums (Billboard)	71

=== Singles ===
Chart performance for singles from Tullahoma
Year	Single	Peak chart positions					Certifications	Sales
Year	Single	US	US Country	US Country Airplay	AUS Country	CAN Country	Certifications	Sales
2018	"Good Girl"	44	8	1	1	5	RIAA: Gold; MC: Gold	US: 83,000
2019	"Ridin' Roads"	47	5	1	4	11	RIAA: Platinum	US: 82,000
2020	"Momma's House"	59	8	5	19	35		
2020	"Red Dirt, Blue Eyes"	—	—	—	42	—		
2021	"Thinking 'Bout You"	30	2	1	—	2		
"—" denotes releases that did not chart.
