= Mickey Jack Cones =

American record producer (born 1973)

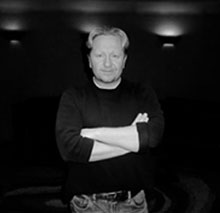

Background information
- Born: May 5, 1973 (age 53); San Antonio, Texas, United States
- Genres: Country, rock, pop
- Occupations: Record producer, singer, songwriter, musician
- Instruments: Vocals, guitar, bass, piano, percussion, programming

Mickey Jack Cones (born in San Antonio, TX) is an American record producer, engineer, session musician, singer and songwriter. Raised in a musical family, he is the grandson of Glenn Gray Orchestra singer Jane Cones and son of Jackie Cones of The Cones Sisters; Produced by Barry Beckett for RCA during the late 80's. Cones moved to Nashville in 1996 to finish his BBA (with an emphasis in studio production) at Belmont University.

== Early life ==
Cones grew up in San Antonio, Texas in a musical family. His grandmother sang in the Glenn Gray Orchestra; his mother performed as part of The Cones Sisters. When he was 8, Cones started taking guitar lessons and manipulating the family tape deck to make multi-level tracks at home. As he started writing songs and singing in bands, he'd go into a local studio to record his music. Though he was making a good living as a bandleader in Texas dance halls in his 20s, Cones opted to move to Nashville in December 1996.

Cones earned a degree at Belmont University and landed a job as a waiter at Planet Hollywood. He stayed focused on breaking into the Nashville industry and signed on as a staff engineer with David Malloy and J. Gary Smith at Malloy Boys in 1998. As his career developed, Cones also learned to become adept at the roles of producer, from finding the songs to working with the label to booking the musicians.

== Musical career ==
After graduating from Belmont, Mickey produced, engineered, wrote and played all of the music that landed Joshua and Jacob Miller/"Nemesis Rising" a recording contract with Curb Records (LA). He also produced Curb Recording artist David Kersh in early 2000. Cones signed a 5-year publishing agreement with EMI Nashville that same year and has had songs recorded by artists such as Trace Adkins, Matt Stillwell, Nemesis Rising, Chad Hudson, Anson Carter, Julie Roberts and others. In 2002, Cones toured with Mercury recording artist Julie Roberts as her band leader (guitar and background vocals) and road manager. He toured with Roberts for 2 years and performed on The Tonight Show, Good Morning America, the Country Music Awards, The Grand Ole Opry and Rascal Flatts' "Here's To You" tour.

In 2017, Cones landed his eighth No. 1 single as a producer with country artist Dustin Lynch's "Seein' Red." That release was the fourth consecutive No. 1 single for Cones and Lynch, following "Where It's At (Yep, Yep)," "Hell of a Night," and "Mind Reader." Cones produced Dustin Lynch's second studio album Where It's At', which was released via Broken Bow Records September 9, 2014 and features the #1 hit single "Where It's At (Yep, Yep)". The second single "Hell Of A Night" hit #1 on the Billboard Country Charts and went Gold in February 2016. In addition, Cones secured back-to-back No. 1 hits with Joe Nichols with 2013's "Sunny and 75" and 2014's "Yeah." On Spotify, these six songs collectively have been streamed more than 210 million times. Cones' mantle also includes a 2016 Producer of the Year trophy from the Canadian Country Music Association (CCMA) for Brett Kissel's album Pick Me Up, featuring the No. 1 singles "Airwaves" and "Pick Me Up." "Pick Me Up", was nominated for a JUNO Award for Country Album of the Year.

Cones is well known for producing Trace Adkins' "Love Will..." (CD) and "Something's Going On", Jeff Bates, Kristy Lee Cook & Randy Houser's "Wherever Love Goes" (single), Craig Campbell (singer)'s single "Outskirts of Heaven", Joe Nichols' "Never Gets Old" and "Crickets" album and its No. 1 single "Sunny and 75". He has also produced projects for Mitchell Tenpenny ("Linden Ave"), Dustin Lynch ("Current Mood"), Jameson Rodgers' single "Some Girls", Vanessa Marie Carter's debut single "Bless My Heart", Runaway June ("Lipstick" and "Wild West"), Trace Adkins and Exile ("Kiss You All Over"), the Act of Valor soundtrack ("If The Sun Comes Up"), James Wesley (Broken Bow Records), Matt Stillwell (Average Joes Entertainment), Chad Hudson (Universal Music Group), Nicky Barot (UK), Damien Leith (Australian Idol winner) and Jimmy Fortune (Statler Brothers).

As a publisher, he landed a No. 1 country single with Luke Combs' "When It Rains, It Pours," co-written by Combs, Ryan Fulcher, and COR Entertainment writer Jordan Walker. Also under the COR Entertainment umbrella, Cones is overseeing the launch of new duo Walker McGuire (composed of Jordan Walker and Johnny McGuire). Cones negotiated a record deal for the duo with Broken Bow Records; after that, he entered into a co-management deal with Vector Management. The duo released their debut EP in January 2018.

As a recording engineer, Cones has worked on multiple albums with Jason Aldean. This led to Grammy nominations as an engineer on 2010s "My Kinda Party" and 2012's "Night Train". Some of his works include: George Strait's "Love Is Everything" (CD), Thomas Rhett's "It Goes Like This" (CD), Alabama's "Alabama & Friends" (CD), Lionel Richie's "Tuskegee" (CD), and Joe Nichols' "Crickets" (CD). Other artists that Cones has engineered are: Luke Bryan, Steven Tyler, Carrie Underwood, Mötley Crüe, Linkin Park, Kellie Pickler, Buckcherry, Blake Shelton, Montgomery Gentry, Aerosmith, Kristen Kelly, Andy Griggs, Ludacris, 3 Doors Down, Julianne Hough, Eric Church, the cast of "Nashville" and many others. His soundtrack work includes Nashville, Country Strong and Act of Valor.

Cones not only produces and engineers records, he plays, programs and sings on them as well. Mickey has played electric guitar, acoustic guitar, bass, keys, synthesizer, percussion, programmed and sung background vocals on major album projects for George Strait, Trace Adkins, Joe Nichols, Reba McEntire, Steven Tyler, Billy Gilman, Country Strong (soundtrack), Heidi Newfield, Katrina Elam, Jeff Bates, Act of Valor (soundtrack), Chuck Wicks, Kevin Fowler, Thomas Rhett, Andy Griggs, Kristen Kelly and more.

== COR Entertainment ==
After more than 20 years of experience in the country music industry, Cones has gained recognition in the music publishing community through his venture, COR Entertainment. Cones founded the company in 2015 because he wanted to impart the knowledge he's acquired through experience in the studio and beyond. He recognizes that everyone on an artist's team is now responsible for artist growth, from producers and engineers to managers and publishers. To that point, the company's initials stand for Creating and Operating Real Entertainment. COR Entertainment includes the subsidiaries COR Music Publishing and COR Artist Services.

Co-written by COR Music Publishing songwriters, Jordan Walker and Johnny McGuire, along with Brian Carper and Trey Matthews, Walker McGuire's first single, "Til Tomorrow" hit top 40 on country radio. "When It Rains It Pours", released by Sony Music / River House artist, Luke Combs, was COR Music Publishing and Jordan Walker's first No. 1 song on country radio. Co-writers included Luke Combs and Ray Fulcher.

Through COR, Cones is producing Walker McGuire, along with new artists Jameson Rodgers and Vanessa Marie Carter.

== Personal life ==
Cones currently resides in College Grove, Tennessee with his wife, Shannon, and son, Jackson Daniel Cones.
