= Killed the Cowboy =

Studio album by Dustin Lynch
- Released: September 29, 2023
- Studio: Sound Stage (Nashville)
- Genre: Country
- Length: 37:50
- Label: Broken Bow
- Producer: Zach Crowell

Dustin Lynch chronology
Blue in the Sky (2022)	Killed the Cowboy (2023)	Clean Slate (2026)

Singles from Killed the Cowboy
- 1. "Chevrolet" Released: December 11, 2023

Killed the Cowboy is the sixth studio album by American country music singer Dustin Lynch, released on September 29, 2023, through Broken Bow Records. It was preceded by the release of the title track on September 8, 2023. Lynch co-wrote five of the 12 tracks on the album, which was primarily produced by Zach Crowell.

== Background ==
The album was called Lynch's most "relentlessly honest and self-inquisitive project to date" and lyrically addresses why Lynch has not "settled down and gotten married yet" and questions "what it means [for Lynch] to still be single in his late 30s". The title track lyrically talks about a woman having broken Lynch's heart as having "killed the cowboy". Lynch stated that he hoped the album would reach "single people of the world and lift them up, to let them know that you don't have to live a 'normal' life to still be happy in your own skin".

== Track listing ==
Killed the Cowboy track listing
No.	Title	Writer(s)	Length
1.	"Killed the Cowboy"	Jordan Reynolds; Devin Dawson; Anderson East	3:18
2.	"Honky Tonk Heartbreaker"	Dustin Lynch; Hunter Phelps; Zach Crowell; Ben Johnson	3:26
3.	"George Strait Jr."	Lynch; Phelps; Reynolds; Andy Albert	3:15
4.	"Chevrolet" (featuring Jelly Roll)	Chase McGill; Jessi Alexander; Phelps; Mentor Williams	3:04
5.	"If I Stop Drinkin'"	John Morgan; Dallas Davidson; Kyle Fishman; Jordan Minton	3:18
6.	"Only Girl in This Town"	Dawson; Josh Thompson; Fishman	3:40
7.	"Breakin' Up Down"	Phelps; Crowell; Blake Pendergrass; Brent Anderson	3:02
8.	"Trouble with This Truck"	Lynch; Phelps; Ashley Gorley; Crowell	2:53
9.	"Blue Lights"	Jameson Rodgers; Jake Mitchell; Anderson; Phelps	2:47
10.	"Lone Star"	Dawson; Reynolds; Alysa Vanderheym	3:19
11.	"Listen to the Radio"	Lynch; Phelps; Randy Montana; Johnson	3:06
12.	"Long Way Home"	Lynch; Fishman; Albert	2:42
Total length:			37:50

=== Note ===
- "Chevrolet" contains interpolations from "Drift Away", written by Mentor Williams.

== Personnel ==
Credits adapted from the album's liner notes.

- Dustin Lynch – lead vocals
- Zach Crowell – production, additional recording, programming, keyboards, background vocals
- Ben Johnson – production on "Honky Tonk Heartbreaker", programming, electric guitar, acoustic guitar
- Ben Phillips – production on "Chevrolet", programming, keyboards
- Kyle Fishman – production on "Only Girl in This Town"
- Nick Autry – recording
- Zach Wills – recording assistance
- Zach Kuhlman – recording assistance, mixing assistance
- Jacob Durrett – background vocals recording on "Only Girl in This Town"
- Jim Cooley – mixing
- Andrew Mendelson – mastering
- Scott Johnson – production management
- Nir Z – drums
- Aaron Sterling – drums
- Mark Hill – bass
- Jimmie Lee Sloas – bass
- Ilya Toshinskiy – acoustic guitar
- Sol Philcox-Littlefield – electric guitar
- Kenny Greenberg – electric guitar
- Devin Malone – electric guitar, acoustic guitar, mandolin
- Chase McGill – acoustic guitar, Dobro
- Jenee Fleenor – fiddle
- Scotty Sanders – pedal steel
- Devin Dawson – background vocals
- Ben Caver – background vocals
- Jordan Reynolds – background vocals
- Madeline Merlo – background vocals
- Brent Anderson – background vocals
- Alysse Gafkjen – photography
- Brad Hersh – design

== Charts ==
Chart performance for Killed the Cowboy
Chart (2023)	Peak position
US Top Country Albums (Billboard)	47
US Top Current Album Sales (Billboard)	75
