= Good Girl (Dustin Lynch song) =

Single by Dustin Lynch

from the album Tullahoma
- Released: May 21, 2018
- Genre: Country pop
- Length: 3:09
- Label: Broken Bow
- Songwriters: Dustin Lynch; Justin Ebach; Andy Albert
- Producer: Zach Crowell

Dustin Lynch singles chronology
"I'd Be Jealous Too" (2017)	"Good Girl" (2018)	"Ridin' Roads" (2019)

"Good Girl" is a song recorded by American country music singer Dustin Lynch. It was released in May 2018 by Broken Bow as the lead single from his fourth studio album Tullahoma (2020). Lynch wrote the song with Justin Ebach and Andy Albert, and Zach Crowell produced it. It's about a woman that Lynch describes as being perfect and has changed him for the better. "Good Girl" gave Lynch his sixth number one hit on the Billboard Country Airplay chart, as well as his first as a writer. It also peaked at numbers eight and 44 on both the Hot Country Songs and Hot 100 charts respectively. It has sold 83,000 copies in the United States as of January 2019. The song achieved similar success in Canada, reaching number five on the Canada Country chart. An accompanying music video for the song, directed by Mason Dixon, tells a story inspired by Bonnie and Clyde.

== History ==
Lynch released the single in mid-2018 following the poor chart performance of his previous single "I'd Be Jealous Too". He said in a video posted to Instagram that he asked label executives for permission to release the single in order for it to be successful in the summertime, and they approved of the choice.

Rolling Stone described the song as "continues Lynch's flirtation with R&B vibes but trades the EDM beats of ['I'd Be Jealous Too'] for a laid-back tune about having found the right kind of love, one with the potential to last beyond the upcoming summer season." The Boot wrote that the song "is an ode to Lynch's love" and "Throughout the summery, upbeat track, Lynch explains just how perfect she is, and how she's changed his world for the better."

== Commercial performance ==
"Good Girl" peaked at number one on the Billboard Country Airplay chart dated January 19, 2019, which is Lynch's sixth number one on the chart, and his first as a writer. On the Billboard Hot 100, the song debuted at number 93 the week of November 24, 2018. Eight weeks later, it peaked at number 44 the week it reached atop the Country Airplay chart, and remained on the Hot 100 for fifteen weeks. It has sold 83,000 copies in the United States as of January 2019. A year later, "Good Girl" was certified gold by the Recording Industry Association of America (RIAA). In Canada, the track debuted at number 50 on the Canada Country chart dated October 13, 2018. Sixteen weeks later, it peaked at number five the week of February 2, 2019, and stayed on the chart for twenty-four weeks. A day earlier, it was certified gold by Music Canada in Canada, denoting sales of over 40,000 units in that country.

== Music video ==
The song has a music video directed by Mason Dixon, which features Lynch and actress Angie Simms (sister of The Voice season two runner-up Juliet Simms) portraying a storyline inspired by Bonnie and Clyde. It was filmed in Palmdale, California. He debuted the video on the website of Esquire magazine in September 2018.

== Charts ==
=== Weekly charts ===
Chart (2018–2019)	Peak position
Australia Country (TMN)	1
Canada Country (Billboard)	5
US Billboard Hot 100	44
US Country Airplay (Billboard)	1
US Hot Country Songs (Billboard)	8

=== Year-end charts ===
Chart (2018)	Position
US Hot Country Songs (Billboard)	80
Chart (2019)	Position
US Country Airplay (Billboard)	46
US Hot Country Songs (Billboard)	72

== Certifications ==
Region	Certification	Certified units/sales
Canada (Music Canada)	Gold	40,000^{‡}
United States (RIAA)	Platinum	1,000,000^{‡}
^{‡} Sales+streaming figures based on certification alone.
