= Ridin' Roads =

Single by Dustin Lynch

from the album Tullahoma
- Released: March 25, 2019
- Genre: Country; country pop
- Length: 3:32
- Label: Broken Bow
- Songwriters: Dustin Lynch; Ashley Gorley; Zach Crowell
- Producer: Zach Crowell

Dustin Lynch singles chronology
"Good Girl" (2018)	"Ridin' Roads" (2019)	"Momma's House" (2020)

"Ridin' Roads" is a song co-written and recorded by American country music singer Dustin Lynch. It was released on March 25, 2019 by Broken Bow as the second single from his fourth studio album Tullahoma (2020). It was co-written by Lynch, Ashley Gorley and Zach Crowell, who also produced the song. Lynch described it as being thematically similar to "Small Town Boy", taking inspiration from a friend's Snapchat post of a farm truck. "Ridin' Roads" gave Lynch his seventh number-one hit on the Billboard Country Airplay chart. It also reached numbers five and 47 on both the Hot Country Songs and Hot 100 charts respectively. It was certified double Platinum by the Recording Industry Association of America (RIAA), and has sold 82,000 units in the United States as of January 2020. The song also charted in Canada, peaking within the top 10 of the Canada Country chart. An accompanying music video for the song, directed by Mason Dixon, features Lynch and his girlfriend going through the Everglades at night.

== History and content ==
Lynch released the song in March 2019 alongside an EP of the same name which also includes the songs "Little Town Livin'" and "Red Dirt, Blue Eyes". He co-wrote the song with Ashley Gorley and Zach Crowell, the latter of whom also produced it. Lynch said that the idea for the song came about after seeing a Snapchat post of a friend in his farm truck; he came up with one verse and a chorus and later presented the idea to Gorley and Crowell. Lynch described the song as being thematically similar to his previous hit, "Small Town Boy".

== Critical reception ==
Rolling Stone writer Joseph Hudak called the song "slow-rolling" with "programmed beats and studio polish" and "some unexpected Dobro and stringed instruments;" of the lyrics, he said that the song "celebrates the nighttime drives of Lynch's formative years in Tullahoma, Tennessee, where having his girlfriend beside him with no particular place to go was all that mattered." Billy Dukes of Taste of Country described the song as an "R&B-influenced, rural cruiser" with "the kind of specific detail so often lacking from similar songs."

== Commercial performance ==
"Ridin' Roads" reached number one on the Billboard Country Airplay chart dated January 11, 2020. This is Lynch's seventh number-one hit on that chart, and his second as a writer after "Good Girl". On the Billboard Hot 100, it debuted at number 88 the week of November 16, 2019. Nine weeks later, it peaked at number 47 the week of January 18, 2020. On the week of April 11, it reappeared at number 88 and peaked at number 87 two weeks later before leaving completely, staying on the chart for twenty weeks. "Ridin' Roads" was certified platinum by the Recording Industry Association of America (RIAA) on July 22, 2020. The song has sold 82,000 copies in the United States as of January 2020.

== Music video ==
In May 2019, Lynch released a music video for the song. Directed by Mason Dixon, the video features Lynch traveling through the Everglades at night with a female love interest. The video uses a camera technique called "double exposure", in which the moving parts in the video are projected through Lynch's, his girlfriend's, and the car's own image.

== Charts ==
=== Weekly charts ===
Chart (2019–2020)	Peak position
Australia Country Hot 50 (TMN)	4
Canada Country (Billboard)	10
US Billboard Hot 100	47
US Country Airplay (Billboard)	1
US Hot Country Songs (Billboard)	5
US Rolling Stone Top 100	99

=== Year-end charts ===
Chart (2019)	Position
US Hot Country Songs (Billboard)	58
Chart (2020)	Position
US Country Airplay (Billboard)	44
US Hot Country Songs (Billboard)	53

== Certifications ==
Region	Certification	Certified units/sales
United States (RIAA)	2× Platinum	2,000,000^{‡}
^{‡} Sales+streaming figures based on certification alone.
