= Seein' Red (Dustin Lynch song) =

2016 single by Dustin Lynch

Single by Dustin Lynch

from the album Current Mood
- Released: July 11, 2016
- Recorded: 2016
- Genre: Country rock; country pop
- Length: 3:14
- Label: Broken Bow
- Songwriters: Tully Kennedy; Kurt Allison; Steve Bogard; Jason Sever
- Producer: Mickey Jack Cones

Dustin Lynch singles chronology
"Mind Reader" (2015)	"Seein' Red" (2016)	"Small Town Boy" (2017)

"Seein' Red" is a song recorded by American country music artist Dustin Lynch. It was released to country radio on July 11, 2016 as the lead single from his third studio album Current Mood (2017). The song was written by Kurt Allison, Steve Bogard, Tully Kennedy and Jason Sever. "Seein' Red" gave Lynch his fourth consecutive number-one hit on the Country Airplay chart. It also reached numbers five and 55 on both the Hot Country Songs and Hot 100 charts respectively. It was certified Gold by the Recording Industry Association of America (RIAA), denoting sales of over 500,000 copies in the country. The song achieved similar success in Canada, peaking at number four on the Country chart. It received a Gold certification from Music Canada, denoting sales of over 40,000 units in that country. The accompanying music video for the song, directed by Adam Rothlein, is loosely based on the Foo Fighters' 2007 video for "The Pretender".

== Commercial performance ==
"Seein' Red" debuted at number 41 on the Billboard Country Airplay chart dated July 9, 2016, and number 31 on the Hot Country Songs chart the following week. It reached number one on the Country Airplay chart the week of February 25, 2017, making this Lynch's fourth consecutive number one on this chart, and stayed there for 35 weeks. That same week, it peaked at number five on the Hot Country Songs chart, remaining there for 34 weeks. On the Hot 100, the track debuted at number 79 the week of January 14. Four weeks later, it peaked at number 55 the week of February 11, staying on the chart for nine weeks. The song has sold 213,000 copies in the US as of March 2017. It was certified gold by the RIAA in the US on July 14, 2017 for 500,000 units in sales and streams. In Canada, the track debuted at number 49 on the Country chart the week of November 12, 2016, and peaked at number four the week of February 10, 2017, staying on the chart for 21 weeks. The track received a gold certification from Music Canada on November 13, 2017.

== Music video ==
The music video was directed by Adam Rothlein and premiered on The Country Network, CMT, GAC and Vevo in November 2016. It is loosely based on the 2007 video for "The Pretender" by Foo Fighters, and features Lynch and his band playing in an all-white room in front of a big red screen. The screen shows black-and-white footage of a woman with red lips and red heels, made to look as if Lynch was imagining the scenes. Right as the last chorus hits, just like in the Foo Fighters video, the screen explodes right in the band's direction, and engulfs the band and Lynch in red powder. The video ends with Lynch and the band finishing the song messy, but unscathed. Scenes featuring Dustin and the woman making out in a bed were also filmed, but eventually cut from the final video.

== Live performance ==
On July 6, 2016, Lynch first performed the song live on Conan.

== Charts ==
=== Weekly charts ===
Chart (2016–2017)	Peak position
Canada Country (Billboard)	4
US Billboard Hot 100	55
US Country Airplay (Billboard)	1
US Hot Country Songs (Billboard)	5

=== Year-end charts ===
Chart (2016)	Position
US Hot Country Songs (Billboard)	86

Chart (2017)	Position
Canada Country (Billboard)	40
US Country Airplay (Billboard)	46
US Hot Country Songs (Billboard)	60

== Certifications ==
Region	Certification	Certified units/sales
Canada (Music Canada)	Gold	40,000^{‡}
United States (RIAA)	Gold	500,000^{‡} / 327,000
^{‡} Sales+streaming figures based on certification alone.
