= Nemesis (duo) =

American pop music duo

- Origin: United States
- Genres: Pop
- Years active: 2001–present
- Label: Curb Records
- Members: Jacob Miller; Joshua Miller

Nemesis is an American pop music duo consisting of the identical twin brothers Jacob and Joshua Miller.

The journey of the duo was portrayed on the Logo television network reality series entitled Jacob and Joshua: Nemesis Rising. The show premiered on October 16, 2006.

Nemesis were signed with Curb Records in 2001. The duo released the EP Let Me Help You Out in 2005. "Number One in Heaven", the first single from the album Rise Up, was released in September 2006 and was quickly followed by "Rise Up" in October to coincide with the premiere of the reality show. The music video for "Number One in Heaven" could be seen on the Click List Music program of Logo. It also aired on MTV Hits, which, like Logo, is owned by MTV Networks.

== Personal life ==
They were raised as Jehovah's Witnesses in Kalispell, Montana, but have since left the religion. They were disfellowshipped after publicly stating they had left the religion.

== Discography ==
- Let Me Help You Out (EP) - 2005
- Rise Up - 2006
