= Momma's House =

Single by Dustin Lynch

from the album Tullahoma
- Released: February 3, 2020
- Studio: Ocean Way, Nashville
- Genre: Country rock
- Length: 3:40
- Label: Broken Bow
- Songwriters: Dylan Schneider; Michael Lotten; Rodney Clawson; Justin Wilson
- Producer: Zach Crowell

Dustin Lynch singles chronology
"Ridin' Roads" (2019)	"Momma's House" (2020)	"Red Dirt, Blue Eyes" (2020)

Music video
- "Momma's House" on YouTube

"Momma's House" is a song recorded by American country music artist Dustin Lynch. It was released on February 3, 2020, as the third single from his fourth studio album Tullahoma (2020). It was written by Dylan Schneider, Michael Lotten, Rodney Clawson and Justin Wilson.

== Background ==
The song was co-written by Dylan Schneider, Michael Lotten, Rodney Clawson and Justin Wilson. "Momma's House" tells a story of heartbreak in a unique and rather violent way.

Lynch said: "And that's who you married and that's who you had a family with, so 'Momma's House' really takes me back to those times".

== Music video ==
The music video was uploaded on April 8, 2020, directed by Mason Dixon and filmed in Lafayette, Tennessee. It depicts Lynch walking around the small town that goes up in flames, the premise being Lynch is so heartbroken that he'd burn down the entire town where his relationship was centered if only his mom's house weren't there.

== Chart performance ==
On the week of April 17, 2021, "Momma's House" reached numbers five and eight on both the Billboard Country Airplay and Hot Country Songs charts respectively, becoming his first top 10 hit to miss the number one spot since his 2012 debut single “Cowboys and Angels” which peaked at number two On the Billboard Hot 100, the song debuted at number 88 the week of January 16 before leaving the chart. It would go on to peak at number 59 the week of April 17, staying on the chart for fifteen weeks. In Canada, the track reached number 35 on the Canada Country chart the week it debuted on the Hot 100, and remained on the chart for twenty weeks.

== Charts ==
=== Weekly charts ===
Chart (2020–2021)	Peak position
Australia Country Hot 50 (TMN)	19
Canada Country (Billboard)	35
US Billboard Hot 100	59
US Country Airplay (Billboard)	5
US Hot Country Songs (Billboard)	8

=== Year-end charts ===
Chart (2020)	Position
US Hot Country Songs (Billboard)	78

Chart (2021)	Position
US Country Airplay (Billboard)	31
US Hot Country Songs (Billboard)	49

== Certifications ==
Region	Certification	Certified units/sales
United States (RIAA)	Gold	500,000^{‡}
^{‡} Sales+streaming figures based on certification alone.
