= Thinking 'Bout You (Dustin Lynch song) =

Single by Dustin Lynch featuring MacKenzie Porter or Lauren Alaina

from the album Tullahoma and Blue in the Sky
- Released: May 3, 2021
- Genre: Country
- Length: 2:50
- Label: Broken Bow
- Songwriters: Dustin Lynch; Andy Albert; Hunter Phelps; Will Weatherly
- Producer: Zach Crowell

Dustin Lynch singles chronology
"Red Dirt, Blue Eyes" (2020)	"Thinking 'Bout You" (2021)	"Party Mode" (2022)

MacKenzie Porter singles chronology
"Drinkin' Songs" (2020)	"Thinking 'Bout You" (2021)	"This Sucks." (2021)

Music video
- "Thinking 'Bout You" on YouTube

"Thinking 'Bout You" is a song written by American country music singer Dustin Lynch with Andy Albert, Hunter Phelps, and Will Weatherly. It was first recorded by Lynch as a duet with fellow American country singer Lauren Alaina for Lynch's fourth studio album, Tullahoma (2020). Due to promotional conflicts, the song was re-recorded in 2021 featuring Canadian country singer MacKenzie Porter for release as the album's fifth single. The single version with Porter debuted to American country radio on May 3, 2021.

The latter version of the song was also included on Lynch's 2022 album Blue in the Sky as its lead single.

== Background ==
Lynch co-wrote "Thinking 'Bout You" with Andy Albert, Hunter Phelps, and Will Weatherly for his fourth studio album, Tullahoma. The song is structured as a "call-and-response" conversation between ex-partners and represents the first true duet Lynch has recorded. It was originally recorded as a duet between Lynch and Lauren Alaina. When the song was selected as the next single from Tullahoma, Alaina had recently released her latest single (at the time) "Getting Over Him" with Jon Pardi and Alaina's record label had concerns over her having two male-female duets at radio concurrently. As a compromise between the artists, "Thinking 'Bout You" was re-recorded for its single release. Lynch held a blind audition for a new female vocalist and ultimately chose Canadian singer and actress MacKenzie Porter as his new duet partner. The remix with Porter was released to digital retailers and streaming services March 19, 2021, and was serviced to American country radio on May 3, 2021.

== Critical reception ==
Markos Papadatos of Digital Journal praised the combination of Lynch and Porter's voices and described the song as "catchy and worthy of the repeat button." Off the Record UK wrote that the "passionate power duet" featured "heart-pounding hooks and memory-soaked vocals."

== Chart performance ==
"Thinking 'Bout You" became Lynch's eighth number one hit, Porter's first, and Alaina's fourth (being officially credited to "Dustin Lynch featuring MacKenzie Porter or Lauren Alaina") on the Billboard Country Airplay chart dated December 11, 2021, and stayed at the top for six consecutive weeks. It is Lynch's longest-running number one on the chart and has spent a record-breaking 28 weeks in the top ten, besting Jason Aldean and Carrie Underwood's "If I Didn't Love You". The record was later broken by Shaboozey's "A Bar Song (Tipsy)" in February 2024, spending 33 weeks in the top ten. With a peak of number 30, it is Lynch's highest charting single on the Billboard Hot 100.

== Music video ==
An accompanying music video premiered March 19, 2021, concurrent with the remix's digital release. Directed by Justin Nolan Key, the "cinematic" video builds on the song's conversational tone and features Lynch and Porter as former lovers reminiscing over the phone.

== Charts ==
=== Weekly charts ===
Weekly chart performance for "Thinking 'Bout You"
Chart (2021–2022)	Peak position
Australia Country Hot 50 (TMN)	11
Canada Hot 100 (Billboard)	46
Canada Country (Billboard)	2
US Billboard Hot 100	30
US Country Airplay (Billboard)	1
US Hot Country Songs (Billboard)	2

=== Year-end charts ===
Year-end chart performance for "Thinking 'Bout You"
Chart (2021)	Position
US Country Airplay (Billboard)	58
US Hot Country Songs (Billboard)	59

Chart (2022)	Position
US Country Airplay (Billboard)	2
US Hot Country Songs (Billboard)	26
US Radio Songs (Billboard)	50

== Certifications ==
Certifications for Thinking 'Bout You
Region	Certification	Certified units/sales
Canada (Music Canada)	2× Platinum	160,000^{‡}
New Zealand (RMNZ)	Gold	15,000^{‡}
United States (RIAA)	4× Platinum	4,000,000^{‡}
^{‡} Sales+streaming figures based on certification alone.

== Release history ==
Release history and formats for "Thinking 'Bout You"
Country	Date	Format	Label	Version	Ref.
Various	March 19, 2021	Digital download; streaming	Broken Bow	Single version with MacKenzie Porter	
United States	May 3, 2021	Country radio	Broken Bow	Single version with MacKenzie Porter	
