= Stars Like Confetti =

Single by Dustin Lynch

from the album Blue in the Sky
- Released: January 30, 2023
- Genre: Country
- Length: 3:14
- Label: BBR
- Songwriters: Josh Thompson; Thomas Rhett; Zach Crowell
- Producer: Zach Crowell

Dustin Lynch singles chronology
"Party Mode" (2022)	"Stars Like Confetti" (2023)	"Chevrolet" (2023)

"Stars Like Confetti" is a song by American country music singer Dustin Lynch, released on January 30, 2023, as the third single from his fifth studio album Blue in the Sky. The song was written by Josh Thompson, Thomas Rhett, and Zach Crowell.

== Content ==
Co-writer Thomas Rhett said that the song's title was inspired by a trip he and his wife, Lauren, took to rural Montana. After noticing he was able to see considerably more stars due to a lack of light pollution, he came up with the title "Stars Like Confetti". During the COVID-19 pandemic in 2020, he presented the idea to Josh Thompson and Zach Crowell over Zoom. Crowell thought that "confetti" was a "softer word" and suggested that the song "tell the story of a guy and a girl". After the song was completed, Rhett worked with Crowell and Devin Malone to record a demo with the intention of having Rhett record the song for himself. When he declined to do so, Crowell sent the song to Dustin Lynch. Crowell kept most of the original demo recording intact on Lynch's version, adding only drums and some guitar riffs.

== Chart performance ==
=== Weekly charts ===
Weekly chart performance for "Stars Like Confetti"
Chart (2023–2024)	Peak position
Canada Hot 100 (Billboard)	83
Canada Country (Billboard)	2
US Billboard Hot 100	81
US Country Airplay (Billboard)	2
US Hot Country Songs (Billboard)	13

=== Year-end charts ===
Year-end chart performance for "Stars Like Confetti"
Chart (2023)	Position
US Country Airplay (Billboard)	41
US Hot Country Songs (Billboard)	89
