= Blue in the Sky =

Studio album by Dustin Lynch
- Released: February 11, 2022
- Genre: Country
- Length: 39:00
- Label: BBR
- Producer: Zach Crowell

Dustin Lynch chronology
Tullahoma (2020)	Blue in the Sky (2022)	Killed the Cowboy (2023)

Singles from Blue in the Sky
- 1. "Thinking 'Bout You" Released: May 3, 2021; 2. "Party Mode" Released: February 14, 2022; 3. "Stars Like Confetti" Released: January 30, 2023

Blue in the Sky is the fifth studio album by American country music singer Dustin Lynch. It was released on February 11, 2022, through BBR Music Group. It was produced by Zach Crowell and preceded by the lead single "Thinking 'Bout You", a collaboration with MacKenzie Porter. The album also includes collaborations with Chris Lane and Riley Green. Lynch toured in support of the record.

== Background ==
Lynch released the lead single "Thinking 'Bout You" featuring MacKenzie Porter in May 2021, a song originally recorded for his previous album Tullahoma as a duet with Lauren Alaina. He followed this with two songs released digitally in July, the "mid-tempo, fiddle-led love story" "Pasadena" and "acoustic ballad" "Not Every Cowboy". In December 2021, Lynch told Taste of Country that the album was finished and had been handed over to his record label. Lynch described the album as a "collection of songs that are going to make you feel good and want to mix a drink and party with your friends".

== Critical reception ==
Professional ratings
Review scores
Source	Rating
AllMusic	3.5/5 stars

Stephen Thomas Erlewine of AllMusic wrote that the album often "wanders into territory that's pretty corny, but Lynch serves up his good times with a smile, an affect that serves him equally well on breezy pop tunes and earnest ballads".

== Track listing ==
Blue in the Sky track listing
No.	Title	Writer(s)	Length
1.	"Party Mode"	Jerry Flowers; Ryan Beaver; Roman Alexander; Jared Keim; Matt McGinn	3:31
2.	"Thinking 'Bout You" (featuring MacKenzie Porter)	Dustin Lynch; Andy Albert; Hunter Phelps; Will Weatherly	2:51
3.	"Stars Like Confetti"	Josh Thompson; Thomas Rhett; Zach Crowell	3:14
4.	"Somethin' That Makes You Smile"	Erik Dylan; Andy Sheridan; Wyatt McCubbin	3:09
5.	"Break It on a Beach"	Lynch; Ashley Gorley; Phelps; Crowell	3:11
6.	"Tequila on a Boat" (featuring Chris Lane)	Hillary Lindsey; Justin Ebach; Matt Alderman	3:07
7.	"Tennessee Trouble"	Lynch; Matt Dragstrem; Phelps; Jordan Minton	2:53
8.	"Summer Never Ended"	Cole Taylor; Ben Hayslip; Paul DiGiovanni	3:20
9.	"Back Road TN"	Hayslip; Brock Berryhill; Jameson Rodgers; Brent Anderson	3:22
10.	"Huntin' Land" (featuring Riley Green)	Lynch; Albert; Phelps; Weatherly	3:01
11.	"Pasadena"	Lynch; Jeff Hyde; Ryan Tyndell	3:35
12.	"Not Every Cowboy"	Casey Brown; Parker Welling; Conner Smith; Heather Morgan	3:49
Total length:			39:00

Digital bonus track
No.	Title	Writer(s)	Length
13.	"Fish in the Sea"	Lynch; Minton; Dragstrem	2:49

== Personnel ==
- Dustin Lynch – lead vocals
- MacKenzie Porter – vocals (track 2)
- Chris Lane – vocals (track 6)
- Riley Green – vocals (track 9)
- Nir Z – drums
- Aaron Sterling – drums
- Jerry Flowers – bass guitar
- Mark Hill – bass guitar
- Jimmie Lee Sloas – bass guitar
- Ilya Toshinsky – acoustic guitar
- Devin Malone – electric guitar, acoustic guitar, pedal steel guitar, dobro, banjo, mandolin
- Derek Wells – electric guitar
- Sol Philcox-Littlefield – electric guitar, acoustic guitar
- Kenny Greenberg – electric guitar
- Josh Matheny – dobro, acoustic guitar
- Justin Ebach – acoustic guitar, programming, background vocals
- Scotty Sanders – dobro, pedal steel guitar
- Jenee Fleenor – fiddle
- Will Weatherly – programming, keyboards, acoustic guitar
- Zach Crowell – producer, programming, keyboards, background vocals, percussion
- Sarah Buxton – background vocals
- Ben Caver – background vocals
- Jeff Hyde – background vocals
- Bryce Cain – digital editing
- Jim Cooley – mixing
- Zach Kuhlman – mixing assistant
- Andrew Mendelson – mastering
- Scott Johnson – production manager

== Charts ==
=== Weekly charts ===
Weekly chart performance for Blue in the Sky
Chart (2022)	Peak position
Australian Country Albums (ARIA)	20
Australian Digital Albums (ARIA)	30
US Billboard 200	125
US Independent Albums (Billboard)	17
US Top Country Albums (Billboard)	9

=== Year-end charts ===
2022 year-end chart performance for Blue in the Sky
Chart (2022)	Position
US Top Country Albums (Billboard)	70
