= Mind Reader (Dustin Lynch song) =

Single by Dustin Lynch

from the album Where It's At
- Released: September 28, 2015
- Recorded: 2014
- Genre: Country; R&B
- Length: 3:05
- Label: Broken Bow
- Songwriters: Rhett Akins; Ben Hayslip
- Producer: Mickey Jack Cones

Dustin Lynch singles chronology
"Hell of a Night" (2014)	"Mind Reader" (2015)	"Seein' Red" (2016)

"Mind Reader" is a song written by Rhett Akins and Ben Hayslip and recorded by American country music artist Dustin Lynch. It was released in September 2015 as the third and final single from Lynch's second studio album Where It's At (2014). It received mixed reviews from critics divided over the production and lyrics. "Mind Reader" became Lynch's third number one hit on the Billboard Country Airplay chart. It also peaked at number eight on both the Hot Country Songs and Canada Country charts respectively. It even reached number 57 on the Billboard Hot 100. It was certified gold by the Recording Industry Association of America (RIAA), and has sold 271,000 copies in the United States as of June 2016. An accompanying music video for the song, directed by Mason Dixon, features a girl reading tarot cards as she's going on a night out with Lynch in Nashville.

== Critical reception ==
An uncredited Taste of Country review stated that "Since his platinum-selling debut single “Cowboys and Angels,” Lynch has released country-rocker after country-rocker and received a mixed bag of reviews and radio airplay (although he’s coming off back to back number-one hits). “Mind Reader” is a more nourishing single than any since his debut and he should be rewarded with another strong seller." Nash Country Weekly writer Jim Casey gave the single a C+, praising the "R&B edginess" of Lynch's voice while criticizing the lyrics as "stale" and the production as "confused juggling synths and distorted guitar with steel."

== Commercial performance ==
"Mind Reader" first entered the Billboard Hot Country Songs chart at number 43 for the week of September 13, 2014 as it was made available before the release of the album Where It's At, and sold 11,000 copies. The following year, when it was released as a single, it entered the Country Airplay chart at number 57 for the week of October 17, 2015 and re-entered the Hot Country Songs chart for the week of December 5, 2015. It entered at number 85 on the Billboard Hot 100 chart for the week of March 12, 2016 and reached number 57 on the week of June 4, staying on the chart for sixteen weeks. The song has sold 271,000 copies in the US as of June 2016. In Canada, it peaked at number eight on the Country chart the week of June 17, and stayed on the chart for nineteen weeks.

== Music video ==
A lyric video directed by Ford Fairchild premiered on Lynch's Vevo channel on October 19, 2015. The official music video was directed by Mason Dixon and premiered in March 2016. It begins with a girl looking at tarot cards, and cuts to her having a night out with Lynch in Nashville. The video ends with Lynch arriving at the girl's house and presumably going on said night out.

== Live performance ==
On March 1, 2016, Lynch performed the song live at the Grand Ole Opry.

== Charts and certifications ==
=== Weekly charts ===
Chart (2015–2016)	Peak position
Canada Country (Billboard)	8
US Billboard Hot 100	57
US Country Airplay (Billboard)	1
US Hot Country Songs (Billboard)	8

=== Year end charts ===
Chart (2016)	Position
US Country Airplay (Billboard)	12
US Hot Country Songs (Billboard)	32

=== Certifications ===
Region	Certification	Certified units/sales
United States (RIAA)	Gold	500,000^{‡}
^{‡} Sales+streaming figures based on certification alone.

== See also ==
- List of number-one country singles of 2016 (U.S.)
