= Wild in Your Smile =

Single by Dustin Lynch

from the album Dustin Lynch
- Released: May 27, 2013
- Recorded: 2012
- Genre: Country
- Length: 3:00
- Label: Broken Bow
- Songwriter(s): Rhett Akins; Ben Hayslip; Marv Green
- Producer(s): Brett Beavers; Luke Wooten

Dustin Lynch singles chronology
"She Cranks My Tractor" (2012)	"Wild in Your Smile" (2013)	"Where It's At" (2014)

"Wild in Your Smile" is a song recorded by American country music artist Dustin Lynch. It was released in May 2013 as the third single from his self-titled debut album. The song was written by Rhett Akins, Ben Hayslip and Marv Green.

== Critical reception ==
Billy Dukes of Taste of Country gave the song three and half stars out of five, saying that "a lesser singer may have turned this into a droll, cliche experience, but ‘Wild in Your Smile’ pops with the help of some country-rock production." Dukes wrote that "it sounds so easy for [Lynch] to sing with strength and conviction, and he’s showing the capability to navigate the subtleties that separate a good song from a great song." In her review of the album, Tammy Ragusa of Country Weekly stated that the song is "a bit more edgy and electrified than one might expect from someone in pearl snaps."

== Chart performance ==
"Wild in Your Smile" debuted at number 53 on the U.S. Billboard Country Airplay chart for the week of June 15, 2013. It also debuted at number 50 on the U.S. Billboard Hot Country Songs chart for the week of October 12, 2013.

Chart (2013–2014)	Peak position
US Country Airplay (Billboard)	23
US Hot Country Songs (Billboard)	32

=== Year-end charts ===
Chart (2014)	Position
US Country Airplay (Billboard)	100
