= Dustin Lynch (album) =

Studio album by Dustin Lynch
- Released: August 21, 2012
- Recorded: 2011–12
- Genre: Country
- Length: 44:01
- Label: Broken Bow Records
- Producers: Brett Beavers; Luke Wooten

Dustin Lynch chronology
Dustin Lynch (2012)	Where It's At (2014)

Singles from Dustin Lynch
- 1. "Cowboys and Angels" Released: January 16, 2012; 2. "She Cranks My Tractor" Released: November 19, 2012; 3. "Wild in Your Smile" Released: May 27, 2013

Professional ratings
Review scores
Source	Rating
Roughstock	3.5/5 stars
Taste of Country	3.5/5 stars

Dustin Lynch is the debut studio album by American country music artist of the same name. It was released on August 21, 2012 by Broken Bow Records. Lynch wrote or co-wrote ten of the album's thirteen tracks, including the first single, "Cowboys and Angels". The album's second single, "She Cranks My Tractor", was released to country radio on November 19, 2012. The album has sold 100,000 copies as of December 2012. The album's third single, "Wild in Your Smile", was released to country radio on May 27, 2013.

== Critical reception ==
Giving it 3 1/2 stars out of 5, Bobby Peacock of Roughstock praised the "uncluttered, often soft production" and Lynch's voice, but thought that the latter half of the album contained too many songs about partying. An identical rating came from Billy Dukes of Taste of Country, who said that "His more pensive, thought-provoking lyrics stand out above the party songs."

== Track listing ==
No.	Title	Writer(s)	Length
1.	"She Cranks My Tractor"	Dustin Lynch; Brett Beavers; Tim Nichols	3:08
2.	"Waiting"	Justin Weaver; Lynch; Kelly Archer	3:38
3.	"Cowboys and Angels"	Lynch; Josh Leo; Nichols	3:47
4.	"Wild in Your Smile"	Rhett Akins; Ben Hayslip; Marv Green	3:00
5.	"Last Lap"	Lynch; Archer; Weaver	3:25
6.	"Sittin' Pretty"	John Edwards; Jason Sever; Steve Bogard	3:11
7.	"Yeah Yeah Yeah"	Phil Barton; Jaron Boyer; Rodney Clawson	3:17
8.	"Rock You Sweet"	Lynch; Sever; Nichols; B. Beavers	3:52
9.	"Unwind It"	Lynch; B. Beavers; Jim Beavers	3:17
10.	"Hurricane"	Bogard; Lynch; Sever; Will Doughty	3:32
11.	"Dancing in the Headlights"	Leo; Nichols; Lynch	3:25
12.	"Name On It"	Lynch; Weaver; Archer	2:56
13.	"Your Plan" (bonus track)	Lynch	3:29

== Personnel ==
Adapted from AllMusic.

- Kurt Allison – electric guitar
- Kelly Archer – background vocals
- Brett Beavers – keyboards, hand claps, programming
- Jimmy Carter – bass guitar
- Kory Caudill – string programming
- Perry Coleman – background vocals
- J. T. Corenflos – electric guitar
- Ray Driskoll – hand claps
- Jared Evans – hand claps
- Larry Franklin – fiddle
- Tommy Harden – drums, percussion
- Mike Johnson – steel guitar
- Tully Kennedy – bass guitar
- Dustin Lynch – lead vocals, background vocals, hand claps
- Rob McNelley – electric guitar
- Jerry McPherson – electric guitar
- Greg Magnum – hand claps
- Alena Moran – hand claps
- Tony Pierce – electric guitar, background vocals
- Mike Rojas – keyboards
- Jason Severs – background vocals
- Steven Sheehan – acoustic guitar
- Nick Spezia – hand claps
- Russell Terrell – background vocals
- Ilya Toshinsky – banjo, acoustic guitar
- Luke Wooten – electric guitar, hand claps, background vocals

== Charts ==
=== Weekly charts ===
Chart (2012)	Peak position
US Billboard 200	13
US Top Country Albums (Billboard)	1
US Independent Albums (Billboard)	1

=== Year-end charts ===
Chart (2012)	Position
US Top Country Albums (Billboard)	52
Chart (2013)	Position
US Top Country Albums (Billboard)	56

=== Singles ===
Year	Single	Peak chart positions				
Year	Single	US Country	US Country Airplay	US	CAN Country	CAN
2012	"Cowboys and Angels"	2	2	40	—	64
2012	"She Cranks My Tractor"	29	16	103	37	—
2013	"Wild in Your Smile"	32	23	—	—	—
"—" denotes releases that did not chart
