= Party Mode =

Single by Dustin Lynch

from the album Blue in the Sky
- Released: February 14, 2022
- Genre: Country
- Length: 3:31
- Label: Broken Bow
- Songwriters: Jerry Flowers; Ryan Beaver; Roman Alexander; Jared Keim; Matt McGinn
- Producer: Zach Crowell

Dustin Lynch singles chronology
"Thinking 'Bout You" (2021)	"Party Mode" (2022)	"Stars Like Confetti" (2023)

Music video
- "Party Mode" on YouTube

"Party Mode" is a song written by Jerry Flowers, Ryan Beaver, Roman Alexander, Jared Keim, and Matt McGinn and recorded by American country music artist Dustin Lynch. It was released on February 14, 2022, as the second single from Lynch's fifth studio album Blue in the Sky.

== Content ==
The song describes a man who goes into town for the "night life" after experiencing heartbreak from a breakup. Lynch also described the song as an account of an experience he had with his previous relationship.

== Critical reception ==
Jeffrey Kurtis of Today's Country Magazine wrote that the song "turns the corner from being just a bright, up-tempo placement on radio playlists, to being a song that can potentially reach through the speakers to help people admit the things they are dealing with during their own breakup misery and how they're choosing to cope with them, bringing to light a potentially better way to face it."

== Music video ==
An accompanying music video was released on February 11, 2022, featuring Lynch and friends as a suitcase mix-up involving cash during travel results in the four doing various activities such as mini golf, until they are confronted by a gang who the cash originally belonged to. After being rescued, the four head home.

== Charts ==
=== Weekly charts ===
Weekly chart performance for "Party Mode"
Chart (2022)	Peak position
Canada Country (Billboard)	48
US Bubbling Under Hot 100 (Billboard)	21
US Country Airplay (Billboard)	17
US Hot Country Songs (Billboard)	30

=== Year-end charts ===
2022 year-end chart performance for "Party Mode"
Chart (2022)	Position
US Country Airplay (Billboard)	47
US Hot Country Songs (Billboard)	70

== Release history ==
Release history for "Party Mode"
Region	Date	Format	Label	Ref.
Various	February 11, 2022	Digital download; streaming	Broken Bow	
United States	February 14, 2022	Country radio	Broken Bow	
