= Current Mood =

Studio album by Dustin Lynch
- Released: September 8, 2017
- Recorded: 2016–2017
- Genre: Country
- Length: 46:45
- Label: Broken Bow
- Producer: Ross Copperman; Mickey Jack Cones; Zach Crowell; Brent Anderson; Will Weatherly

Dustin Lynch chronology
Where It's At (2014)	Current Mood (2017)	Tullahoma (2020)

Singles from Current Mood
- 1. "Seein' Red" Released: July 11, 2016; 2. "Small Town Boy" Released: February 17, 2017; 3. "I'd Be Jealous Too" Released: October 23, 2017

Current Mood is the third studio album by American country music singer Dustin Lynch. It was released on September 8, 2017, via Broken Bow Records. The album includes the singles "Seein' Red", "Small Town Boy", and "I'd Be Jealous Too". The first two singles have both reached number one on the Country Airplay chart.

== Content ==
In advance of the album's release, Lynch released pictures of himself on Twitter wearing shirts related to the album's lyrics and song titles.

The album produced three singles in advance of its release: "Seein' Red", "Small Town Boy." and "I'd Be Jealous Too". The first two singles reached number one on the Billboard Country Airplay charts, and "Small Town Boy" was the fastest rising single of his career and spent four weeks at the top of the chart. "I'd Be Jealous Too" was released as the third single in October 2017.

Karen Fairchild of Little Big Town is featured on the track "Love Me or Leave Me Alone", written by Dustin Christensen.

== Commercial performance ==
The album debuted on Billboard's Top Country Albums chart at number two with 27,000 sold, making a total of 36,000 units including streams and tracks. It sold a further 6,100 copies the following week. It has sold 79,800 copies in the US as of October 2018.

== Track listing ==
No.	Title	Writer(s)	Producer	Length
1.	"I'd Be Jealous Too"	Dustin Lynch; Ross Copperman; Jon Nite	Copperman	3:05
2.	"Seein' Red"	Tully Kennedy; Kurt Allison; Steve Bogard; Jason Sever	Mickey Jack Cones	3:14
3.	"Small Town Boy"	Rhett Akins; Ben Hayslip; Kyle Fishman	Zach Crowell	3:26
4.	"Why We Call Each Other"	Lynch; Lee Thomas Miller; Copperman	Copperman	3:21
5.	"Here We Come"	Lynch; Crowell; Nite	Crowell	3:25
6.	"Love Me or Leave Me Alone" (featuring Karen Fairchild)	Dustin Christensen; Chris Gelbuda	Copperman	4:05
7.	"Back on It"	Brent Anderson; Will Weatherly; Smith Ahnquist	Anderson; Weatherly	3:29
8.	"I Wish You Were Beer"	Nite; Josh Osborne; Justin Ebach	Copperman	3:07
9.	"State Lines"	Lynch; Kyle Fishman; Andy Albert	Cones	3:11
10.	"Party Song"	Brett Tyler; Craig Wiseman; Morgan Wallen	Cones	3:13
11.	"New Girl"	Lynch; Crowell; Ashley Gorley	Crowell	3:39
12.	"Why Not Tonight"	Lynch; Jimmy Robbins; Nite	Copperman	3:06
13.	"Sun Don't Go Down on That"	Lynch; Copperman; Nite	Copperman	3:24

== Charts ==
=== Weekly charts ===
Chart (2017–18)	Peak position
Australian Albums (ARIA)	34
Canadian Albums (Billboard)	25
US Billboard 200	7
US Top Country Albums (Billboard)	2
US Independent Albums (Billboard)	3

=== Year-end charts ===
Chart (2017)	Position
US Top Country Albums (Billboard)	47
US Independent Albums (Billboard)	27
Chart (2018)	Position
US Top Country Albums (Billboard)	31
