= Matt Stillwell =

American singer-songwriter

- Origin: Sylva, North Carolina, United States
- Genres: Country
- Occupation: Singer-songwriter
- Instruments: Vocals, Acoustic Guitar
- Years active: 2008–present
- Labels: Still 7, Average Joe's Entertainment, 723 Entertainment
- Website: http://www.mattstillwell.com

Matt Stillwell (born in Sylva, North Carolina) is an American country music artist. He lives in Knoxville, TN with his wife, Lindsey, and two daughters, Carolina and Ruby.

During college, athletics was Matt's priority, not music. At Western Carolina University, he was an All Conference performer on the Catamount baseball team, playing both infield and outfield. Touted as a probable major league draft choice during his junior season at WCU, he chose music over baseball. "I could have chased the dream and went and tried out and played independent ball," he says, "but I thought, 'If I'm going to chase something,' I’d rather it be music." He later returned to Western Carolina University to be initiated into the North Carolina Omega chapter of Sigma Alpha Epsilon fraternity in the fall of 2017.

In late 2008, he released his debut single, "Shine", which peaked at number 52 on the Billboard Hot Country Songs chart. The single served as the title track to his third album released on September 30, 2008. His fourth album, Right on Time, was released on March 11, 2014. The album's first single, "Ignition," peaked at number 52 on the Billboard Hot Country Songs chart in 2012. In 2015, Stillwell released "Hey Dad", a song written about the loss of his father. The song and video have had a major impact especially online. The updated (2021) version reached #35 on the Billboard Activator Chart and is included on his 2021 album, "Hometown".

Matt found a touring niche during the pandemic with his Hometown House Party Tour. To date, he has traveled over 100k miles across the country playing over 200 intimate concerts for fans from his custom Hometown House Party trailer/stage. In 2020 he started curating intimate songwriter/storyteller events across the country with top country songwriters, called "Sessions w/ Matt Stillwell".

He has worked closely with the Cal Ripken Sr Foundation's "Badges For Baseball" program and MLB across the country. In honor of his college coach, Keith LeClair who passed of ALS, Stillwell created the 723 Foundation, and is working with college baseball to further the legacy of Coach LeClair.

== Discography ==
=== Studio albums ===
Title	Album details
The Couch Sessions	Release date: February 7, 2005; Label: self-released
Take It All In	Release date: June 13, 2006; Label: Inside Out Music
Shine	Release date: October 7, 2008; Label: Still 7 Records
Right on Time	Release date: March 11, 2014; Label: Average Joe's Entertainment
Stillwell	Release date: June, 2017 Label: 723 Entertainment
Hometown	Release date: July 23, 2021 Label: 723 Entertainment

=== Extended plays ===
Title	Album details
At a Glance	Release date: 2004; Label: self-released

=== Singles ===
Year	Single	Peak positions	Album
Year	Single	US Country	Album
2008	"Shine"	52	Shine
2009	"Rain"	—	Shine
2009	"Sweet Sun Angel"	58	Shine
2010	"Dirt Road Dancing"	—	Shine
2010	"Drunk Enough"	—	Shine
2012	"Ignition"	52	Right on Time
2012	"Cold Beer"	—	Right on Time
2015	"Hey Dad"	_	Stillwell
2017	"Something We Can Dance To"	_	Stillwell
2021	"Hey Dad (2021)"	35	Hometown
"—" denotes releases that did not chart

=== Music videos ===
Year	Video	Director
2008	"Shine"	Flick Wiltshire
2009	"Sweet Sun Angel"	Flick Wiltshire
2010	"Dirt Road Dancing"	Potsy Ponciroli
2012	"Ignition"	Potsy Ponciroli
2015	"Hey Dad"	Amanda Young
2018	"Hot Minute"	Amanda Young
2021	"Outta State Plates"	Lexy Kadey
