= Chevrolet (song) =

2023 single by Dustin Lynch featuring Jelly Roll

Single by Dustin Lynch featuring Jelly Roll

from the album Killed the Cowboy
- Released: December 11, 2023
- Genre: Country
- Length: 3:04
- Label: Broken Bow
- Songwriters: Chase McGill; Jessi Alexander; Hunter Phelps; Mentor Williams
- Producers: Zach Crowell; Ben Phillips

Dustin Lynch singles chronology
| "Stars Like Confetti" (2023) | "Chevrolet" (2023) | "Broken Heart Thing" (2024) |

Jelly Roll singles chronology
| "Save Me (Remix)" (2023) | "Chevrolet" (2023) | "Wild Ones" (2023) |

Music video
- "Chevrolet" on YouTube

"Chevrolet" is a song by American country music singer Dustin Lynch featuring American singer Jelly Roll. It was first released on September 15, 2023, as a promotional single from Lynch's sixth studio album Killed the Cowboy (2023), before being released to country radio on December 11, 2023, as the album's lead single. It was written by Chase McGill, Jessi Alexander, Hunter Phelps, and Mentor Williams and produced by Zach Crowell, and Ben Phillips. The song contains lyrics set to the melody of "Drift Away" by Mentor Williams.

== Composition ==
The song opens with acoustic guitar strums and audio samples of people talking in a bar. Dustin Lynch recounts a romantic encounter in the opening verse and sings in the melody of "Drift Away" during the chorus, in which he describes his ideal environment to spend time with a "country girl": a six-pack, some Brooks & Dunn and a Chevrolet. Jelly Roll performs the second verse.

== Music video ==
An official music video was directed by Mason Dixon and released on May 22, 2024. It opens with a teenager being bullied by a peer who is interested in the same girl as him. He cycles home and listens to Jelly Roll's music for comfort in his bedroom. The girl he loves goes to his house, and they drive off to a Dustin Lynch garage concert together.

== Charts ==
=== Weekly charts ===
Weekly chart performance
| Chart (2023–2024) | Peak position |
|---|---|
| Canada Hot 100 (Billboard) | 60 |
| Canada Country (Billboard) | 1 |
| US Billboard Hot 100 | 50 |
| US Country Airplay (Billboard) | 1 |
| US Hot Country Songs (Billboard) | 15 |

=== Year-end charts ===
Annual chart rankings
| Chart (2024) | Position |
|---|---|
| US Country Airplay (Billboard) | 11 |
| US Hot Country Songs (Billboard) | 44 |
| US Radio Songs (Billboard) | 47 |

== Certifications ==
| Region | Certification | Certified units/sales |
|---|---|---|
| United States (RIAA) | Platinum | 1,000,000^{‡} |
^{‡} Sales+streaming figures based on certification alone.
