= Jacob and Joshua: Nemesis Rising =

- Title card
- Starring: Jacob Miller; Joshua Miller
- Opening theme: Rise Up
- Country of origin: United States
- Original language: English
- No. of episodes: 7

Production
- Executive producers: Mark C. Grove; Jeff Keirns; Garry Kief; Troy P. Queen
- Running time: 22 minutes

Original release
- Network: Logo
- Release: October 16 – December 4, 2006

Jacob and Joshua: Nemesis Rising is a reality television program originating on the LGBT network Logo. It follows identical twin brothers Jacob and Joshua Miller, who together comprise the pop duo Nemesis, as they seek success in the music business as openly gay artists. The series premiered on October 16, 2006.

The series is available for download at the iTunes Store, along with a clip show retrospective entitled The Music of Jacob and Joshua: Nemesis Rising. It is currently airing in Canada on OUTtv.

== Episode summaries ==
=== Episode 1: Meet the Twins ===
In the debut episode, Jacob and Joshua Nemesis, are introduced. Jacob is the blond and Joshua is the brunette. They have been under contract to Curb Records for several years but have not progressed beyond the point of recording demo tracks. The boys live together in Los Angeles along with Jacob's boyfriend Nick. Joshua is single, and while Jacob and Nick are fairly domestic, Joshua actively tries to meet men on the internet and at West Hollywood gay clubs The Abbey and iCandy (itself the subject of an earlier Logo reality series, Open Bar).

Nemesis has a meeting the next morning with their manager, Garry Kief. Garry tells the boys that Curb is conditionally ready to commit to producing a single, album and appearances for them. Curb plans to mention in any marketing material that Jacob and Joshua are gay. Jacob is ready to come out to anyone and everyone, including his Jehovah's Witness parents. They were Jehovah's Witnesses but got disfellowshiped for some circumstances. Joshua is much more reluctant. The boys argue about how being known as gay could negatively affect them both professionally and personally. Ultimately they decide to go home to Montana although Joshua says he may still not be able to tell them he's gay.

=== Episode 2: Coming Out in Montana ===
Joshua continues to stress over coming out to his parents, while Jacob invites Nick to go to Montana with them. They plan to have Nick come up toward the end of the visit. Joshua thinks bringing Nick is a bad idea.

The twins fly to Montana and their mother Sherry picks them up at the airport. Back at the house they meet up with brother Jordan and sister Sarah calls home. Dad Rex gets home as well.

As Jacob and Joshua get acquainted with the family's new horses and socialize with the family, Sherry, Rex and the twins interview about being Jehovah's Witnesses. The twins, who've left the religion, note that homosexuality is considered a sin and Joshua especially stresses over the secret he's carrying.

Over a family dinner on the porch, Jacob comes out to their parents on behalf of the two of them. Jordan and Sarah already knew. Sherry and Rex are hard-hit by the news. Sherry and Rex talk about their reactions interspersed with scenes of them telling the boys that they still love them. Sherry interviews that she believes the Bible tells her the God hates homosexuality and that homosexuals won't "inherit the kingdom." Rex interviews that his sons' homosexuality isn't "anything [he] wish[es] to see" and nothing he wants to embrace. He says he still loves them and he will embrace them and not judge them, but that he won't allow it to be part of his and Sherry's "arrangement" because of how they believe. Sherry notes that she thinks Joshua has an "agenda."

Joshua tells Jacob that he thought their parents' reaction was "freaky good" and that things went just as he had hoped. Jacob expresses his relief that for the first time he can set "the gay issue" aside, but interviews that Nick is coming and he hopes his parents can meet him.

=== Episode 3: Montana and Relationships ===
Jacob, Joshua and their family continue to come to terms with the twins' announcement. The twins and Rex do some fly fishing and talk about Rex and Sherry's marriage. Jacob tells Rex that he has always looked to his parents as relationship role models.

Ultimately Jacob decides against having Nick come to Montana. To make up for it, Jacob (who says he's not good at making romantic gestures) makes plans to celebrate their sixth anniversary. He takes Nick sky diving and for a romantic dinner in Laguna Beach. He gives Nick a ring that he knows Nick likes, interviewing that it's not intended as a wedding or "promise" ring. He tells Nick that he's concerned that when Nemesis' career takes off over the next several months, Nick might feel like Jacob is "slipping away" from him. Nick reassures him and they interview separately that they believe their relationship will endure.

Meanwhile, Joshua does some work in the recording studio and cruises the internet to "shop for dudes."

=== Episode 4: Nashville ===
After meeting with manager Garry (and discussing Lance Bass and the possible impact his coming out might have on their own careers) the twins fly to Nashville, Tennessee to meet with Curb Records founder Mike Curb and prepare for a showcase performance. Nick, whose family lives in Nashville, goes with them and Jacob and Joshua visit with his family. Jacob interviews about how tight-knit Nick's family is, how welcomed he has felt by them throughout his relationship with Nick and how he wishes he could bring Nick similarly into his family.

Nemesis meets with Curb, who listens to their cover of Hot Child in the City and is pleased. Joshua gets together with his ex-boyfriend Daniel, whom he describes as his "first love."

As they prepare for the showcase, Jacob is nervous that no one will show up. Joshua struggles with stage fright. In the end the show is packed and the twins' performance of Hot Child is well received.

=== Episode 5: Media Blitz ===
At a lunch meeting with Garry, the twins learn that The Advocate magazine has agreed to feature them on the cover. Joshua again has some anxiety over the gay issue but Jacob is thrilled at the prospect of being on a magazine cover. Nick is equally thrilled for them but Joshua seeks out friend Meredith as a sounding board. She encourages him to embrace the upcoming attention and be proud of being a "pioneer." They call home and tell Mom the news.

At Garry's office, he announces to the twins that Mike Curb has approved the song Number One in Heaven as the first single from their album and has committed to a video shoot the following week. The video will be directed by a husband-and-wife team named Nick and Laura, known as "Honey", who've directed videos for Stevie Nicks, Rage Against the Machine, Dave Navarro and others. Nemesis meets Honey to discuss the concept. Joshua has reservations but Jacob likes it. The twins hire a personal trainer to get in shape for the video.

Nemesis travels to Palm Springs to shoot the album cover. For a change, Jacob is nervous because he doesn't think he photographs well in stills. But, once the photos are taken Joshua is back to worrying about them and Jacob is pleased.

Back in Los Angeles the twins meet with publicist Howard Bragman, who tells them they've lost the Advocate cover but that there will still be a big story. Joshua is relieved but Jacob is annoyed.

It's the day of the video shoot. After a slow start for Joshua they arrive at the Hollywood Roosevelt Hotel, site of the shoot. It goes well and Jacob especially is pleased; however, he grows more worried about the possibility of failure after all the effort they've already made.

=== Episode 6: Barry and Vegas ===
Nemesis is excited to learn that Barry Manilow wants to produce a track for the upcoming album. Barry wants to produce "He Was a Friend of Mine" (which had previously appeared on the soundtrack of Brokeback Mountain performed by Willie Nelson). The twins will fly to Las Vegas next week. Their enthusiasm is dampened, however, upon hearing the demo recording, feeling that it doesn't fit the album. They meet with manager Garry but are still concerned.

Jacob and Joshua fly to Las Vegas. After checking into a luxury suite they go out to a club called Pirhana. Jacob works the club for a while as Joshua hangs back, then when Jacob leaves Joshua starts mingling and mixing.

The next day at the suite, the twins work on the song. Joshua, who will be singing lead, interviews that Jacob's earlier tirade against the song influenced him against it but after having listened to it a few more times he began feeling it would work. They clash over Joshua's level of preparedness, which leads to an uncomfortable dinner. After dinner they meet producer Michael Lloyd at The Palms Casino's Ghost Bar and talk out their concerns with him.

The following morning Jacob and Joshua head to the recording studio and meet Barry. They record the track and Barry shares some stories from his early career. After hearing a rough mix of the track, the twins' fears about the song are assuaged. Jacob, Joshua and Barry all express their satisfaction.

=== Episode 7: HRC, TRL, and Beyond ===
In the season finale, Jacob decides to move out of the apartment he shares with Joshua and Nick. Up in the air is whether Joshua will be moving with him to a new place.

Manager Garry calls in the twins to announce that they have been invited to perform at the Human Rights Campaign annual dinner. Some 3,000 "movers and shakers" will hear them perform. Later over coffee Jacob and Joshua talk about the work that's left to do on the album and about preparing for the HRC performance.

Nemesis flies to Washington, D.C. to meet with HRC president Joe Solmonese. They discuss the role of HRC in the gay community. Later the twins, Nick and Garry head to the convention center to check out the performance space and meet with stage manager Sasha Bamadji. They rehearse and Jacob interviews that he's concerned his voice might not hold up for the performance.

At the HRC dinner Nemesis has a photo op with Solmonese and are excited to meet Billie Jean King. Introduced by the cast of Noah's Arc, the twins perform Rise Up to a very warm reception.

Back in Los Angeles, Jacob and Joshua again meet with Garry and express their concerns over when the album will be released. Those concerns are put aside when Garry informs them they will be appearing on MTV's Total Request Live. Garry interviews that TRL is "this generation's American Bandstand" and the best way to gain mainstream exposure for the act.

MTV VJ Vanessa Minnillo interviews the boys for TRL and they talk about the video shoot for Number One in Heaven. After the appearance, the twins wrap up the season by interviewing about their experiences and all the people who have taken chances for them. They talk about the chances they have taken and how they plan to continue moving forward.

=== Episode 8 ===
An eighth episode, released online, consists of clips of the previous episodes and interview segments with the twins about their experiences with the show, ending with another airing of their music video.
