= She Cranks My Tractor =

Single by Dustin Lynch

from the album Dustin Lynch
- Released: November 19, 2012
- Recorded: 2012
- Genre: Country
- Length: 3:08
- Label: Broken Bow
- Songwriters: Dustin Lynch; Brett Beavers; Tim Nichols
- Producers: Brett Beavers; Luke Wooten

Dustin Lynch singles chronology
"Cowboys and Angels" (2012)	"She Cranks My Tractor" (2012)	"Wild in Your Smile" (2013)

"She Cranks My Tractor" is a song co-written and recorded by American country music artist Dustin Lynch. It was released in November 2012 as the second single from his self-titled debut album. Lynch co-wrote the song with Brett Beavers and Tim Nichols. It garnered mixed reviews from critics divided over the production and lyrical content.

"She Cranks My Tractor" achieved minor chart success compared to Lynch's debut single "Cowboys and Angels", reaching numbers 16 and 29 on both the U.S. Billboard Country Airplay and Hot Country Songs charts respectively. It also charted in Canada, peaking at number 37 on the Canadian Country chart. An accompanying music video for the song was directed by Wes Edwards.

== Content ==
Co-writer Brett Beavers said that the song idea came when Lynch suggested that they write an up-tempo song. The lyric is a double entendre about a woman who is attractive to the narrator.

== Critical reception ==
Billy Dukes of Taste of Country gave the song two stars out of five, writing that "while the song is a bit heavy-handed, [it] is a ton of fun if you don’t listen too closely." Matt Bjorke of Roughstock gave the song a favorable review, saying that "it's another rural route mood-maker but it's well-written, strongly-produced and expertly-performed." Ben Foster of Country Universe gave the song a D grade, writing that "everything about 'She Cranks My Tractor' practically beats the listener over the head, from the pounding bass to the T.M.I. lyrics."

== Music video ==
The music video was directed by Wes Edwards and premiered in November 2012. A lyric video premiered on Lynch's Vevo channel on December 11, 2012.

== Chart performance ==
"She Cranks My Tractor" debuted at number 57 on the U.S. Billboard Country Airplay chart for the week of November 24, 2012. It also debuted at number 49 on the U.S. Billboard Hot Country Songs chart for the week of December 22, 2012. It also debuted at number 15 on the U.S. Billboard Bubbling Under Hot 100 Singles chart for the week of February 9, 2013.

Chart (2012–2013)	Peak position
Canada Country (Billboard)	37
US Bubbling Under Hot 100 (Billboard)	3
US Country Airplay (Billboard)	16
US Hot Country Songs (Billboard)	29

=== Year-end charts ===
Chart (2013)	Position
US Country Airplay (Billboard)	75
US Hot Country Songs (Billboard)	84
