= Where It's At (Dustin Lynch song) =

Single by Dustin Lynch

from the album Where It's At
- Released: March 31, 2014
- Recorded: 2014
- Genre: Country pop
- Length: 3:23
- Label: Broken Bow
- Songwriters: Cary Barlowe; Zach Crowell; Matt Jenkins
- Producer: Mickey Jack Cones

Dustin Lynch singles chronology
| "Wild in Your Smile" (2013) | "Where It's At" (2014) | "Hell of a Night" (2014) |

"Where It's At" (also commonly known as "Where It's At (Yep, Yep)") is a song recorded by American country music artist Dustin Lynch. It was released in March 2014 as the first single from his second studio album. The album, Where It's At, was released on September 9, 2014. The song was written by Cary Barlowe, Zach Crowell and Matt Jenkins. The song garnered positive reviews from critics who praised its upbeat instrumentals and Lynch's vocal performance.

The single was Lynch's first number-one single on the Billboard Country Airplay chart. It also charted at numbers 4 and 42 on both the Hot Country Songs and Hot 100 charts respectively. The song was certified Gold by the Recording Industry Association of America (RIAA), denoting sales of over half-a-million units in that country. It achieved similar chart success in Canada, peaking at number 4 on the Canada Country chart and number 67 on the Canadian Hot 100 chart.

An accompanying music video for the song, directed by Shane Drake, features Lynch hanging out with his girlfriend in various romantic escapades.

== Critical reception ==
The song received a favorable review from Taste of Country calling it "catchy and easy to appreciate" and stating that "a song that doesn’t take itself too seriously but is still plenty enjoyable deserves appreciation." Matt Bjorke of Roughstock gave the song four stars out of five, writing that it "has all the elements of a mainstream hit, from catchy jangly lead guitars to Lynch’s strong voice singing a rhythmic melody." Markos Papadatos of Digital Journal gave the song four and a half stars out of five, saying that it is "upbeat and it has a laid-back summertime vibe to it" and comparing it favorably to Joe Nichols' "Yeah".

== Music video ==
The music video was directed by Shane Drake and premiered in June 2014. The music video has Lynch hanging out with his girlfriend in various romantic escapades during the morning and evening. Most of the shots are taken from the point of view of a camcorder held by Lynch's girlfriend.

== Chart performance ==
"Where It's At (Yep, Yep)" debuted at number 60 on the U.S. Billboard Country Airplay chart for the week of April 5, 2014. It also debuted at number 48 on the U.S. Billboard Hot Country Songs chart for the week of April 26, 2014, with 34,000 copies sold for the week. It also debuted at number 94 on the U.S. Billboard Hot 100 chart for the week of May 3, 2014. The song was certified Gold by the Recording Industry Association of America (RIAA) on August 21, 2014. "Where It's At" is Lynch's first single to be certified Gold since his debut single "Cowboys and Angels", which was certified Gold in September 2012. It has sold 598,000 copies in the U.S. as of October 2014.

=== Weekly charts ===
| Chart (2014) | Peak position |
|---|---|
| Canada (Canadian Hot 100) | 67 |
| Canada Country (Billboard) | 4 |
| US Billboard Hot 100 | 42 |
| US Country Airplay (Billboard) | 1 |
| US Hot Country Songs (Billboard) | 4 |

=== Year-end charts ===
| Chart (2014) | Position |
|---|---|
| US Country Airplay (Billboard) | 3 |
| US Hot Country Songs (Billboard) | 14 |

== Certifications ==
| Region | Certification | Certified units/sales |
|---|---|---|
| United States (RIAA) | Platinum | 1,000,000^{‡} |
^{‡} Sales+streaming figures based on certification alone.
