= Dylan Schneider =

American singer-songwriter

- Born: October 9, 1999 (age 27); Terre Haute, Indiana, United States
- Genres: Country; country pop
- Occupation: Singer-songwriter
- Years active: 2016–present
- Labels: Interscope; Round Here; BBR Music Group
- Website: Official website

Dylan Schneider (born October 9, 1999) is an American country music singer and songwriter. He self-released his debut extended play, Wannabe in August 2016. Labelled "Country Music's Next Rising Star" by Billboard, Schneider has landed two EPs in the Top 20 of the magazine's Heatseekers Albums chart in under a year without a label to support them.

In the following years, Schneider released a series of EPs, secured a publishing deal, and toured with artists such as Florida Georgia Line and Morgan Wallen. Schneider's achievements include two RIAA-certified Gold records and a Top 5 hit as a songwriter with Dustin Lynch's "Momma's House".

== Career ==
Schneider was a fan of pop and hip hop music as a child, but later became attracted to the storytelling aspect of country music and began singing at the age of 14. After meeting Brett Eldredge at a concert in the singer's hometown (Paris, Illinois), Schneider was invited onstage by Eldredge to perform a song during the latter's performance in Terre Haute. He then began writing and performing songs both around Indiana and in Nashville, Tennessee. Between 2014 and 2016, Schneider posted a number of videos to YouTube of him performing cover versions of popular country songs, which earned him attention online. The first video was posted on May 18, 2014.

Schneider released his debut EP, Wannabe, on August 19, 2016. His second EP, 17, was released the day after Schneider's seventeenth birthday and reached number 37 on the Billboard Top Country Albums chart. In February 2017, Schneider released his first radio single, "You Heard Wrong". He released his third EP, Spotlight's on You, on April 14, 2017. The record sold enough copies propelling the EP into the Top 10 of the Heatseekers Albums chart. Schneider released his fourth EP, Whole Town Talk, in August 2019. The EP was released by Interscope Records through a partnership with Round Here Records; an independent label founded by Tyler Hubbard and Brian Kelley of the Florida Georgia Line who also co-wrote several of the new tracks. It was also announced Schneider would join Florida Georgia Line for select dates of their Can't Say I Ain't Country Tour alongside Dan + Shay, Morgan Wallen, and Canaan Smith.

On July 21, 2021, Schneider signed with BBR Music Group.

With over 2 million social media followers, Schneider experienced a surge in popularity, gaining more than 500,000 followers within a few months. His music career has garnered over 388 million on-demand streams.

As a songwriter, Schneider achieved a Top 5 hit with Dustin Lynch's "Momma's House". He also holds two RIAA-certified Gold records, underscoring his achievements in the industry.

In 2023, Schneider was recognized as the "Next Big Thing" by MusicRow, highlighting his emergence in the country music scene. Additionally, he was named a "Breakthrough Artist to Watch" by Amazon Music and an "Artist to Watch" by Pandora.

In September 2024, Schneider will embark on his headlining "Bad Decisions" Tour, featuring MaRynn Taylor. This tour follows his appearances on several tours, including Kane Brown’s "In the Air" Tour, Luke Bryan’s "Mind of a Country Boy" Tour, and Mitchell Tenpenny’s "Woke Up In A Dream" Tour. The "Bad Decisions" Tour is set to kick off in Vancouver, BC, on September 30, 2024.

== Discography ==
=== Studio albums ===
List of albums, with selected details
Title	Album details
Puzzled	Release date: September 27, 2024; Label: Wheelhouse; Format: CD, digital download

=== Extended plays ===
List of extended plays, with selected details, chart positions, and sales
Title	Release Date	Label
Wannabe	August 19, 2016	Dylan Schneider
17	October 9, 2016	Dylan Schneider
Spotlight's On You	April 14, 2017	Dylan Schneider
Whole Town Talk	August 23, 2019	Interscope Records
College Town	March 18, 2022	BBR Music Group
Bad Decisions	April 26, 2024	BBR Music Group

=== Singles ===
List of radio singles, with release year, peak chart position, and certification
Year	Title	Peak Chart Position	Certifications	Album
Year	Title	US Country Airplay	Certifications	Album
2018	"How Does It Sound"	45	RIAA: Gold	—N/a
2023	"Ain't Missin' You"	—		Puzzled
2025	"Better Than You Left Me"	—		Puzzled
