= Hell of a Night (Dustin Lynch song) =

Single by Dustin Lynch

from the album Where It's At
- Released: November 3, 2014
- Recorded: 2014
- Genre: Country rock
- Length: 3:10
- Label: Broken Bow
- Songwriters: Zach Crowell; Adam Sanders; Jaron Boyer
- Producer: Mickey Jack Cones

Dustin Lynch singles chronology
"Where It's At" (2014)	"Hell of a Night" (2014)	"Mind Reader" (2015)

"Hell of a Night" is a song written by Zach Crowell, Adam Sanders, and Jaron Boyer and recorded by American country music artist Dustin Lynch. It was released in November 2014 as the second single from Lynch’s second studio album Where It's At.

"Hell of a Night" reached number one on the US Billboard Country Airplay chart, giving Lynch his second number-one hit on that chart. It also peaked at numbers seven and 55 on both the Hot Country Songs and Billboard Hot 100 charts respectively. The song was certified gold by the Recording Industry Association of America (RIAA), and has sold 295,000 units as of September 2015. It also charted in Canada, peaking at number eight on the Canada Country chart and number 95 on the Canadian Hot 100 chart. The accompanying music video for the song, directed by Michael Monaco, features Lynch giving a live performance to a large audience.

== Critical reception ==
Giving it a "C", Jon Freeman of Country Weekly wrote that "Dustin Lynch offers this unnecessarily heavy and dirge-like song about having a good time that sounds more like the soundtrack to an angst-ridden teenager's lonely Friday night of video games and Mountain Dew. It also awkwardly equates a minor-key melody and hard guitar stabs with 'sexy'," while adding that the production had "interesting guitar effects" and that Lynch "pushes himself vocally."

== Music video ==
The music video was directed by Michael Monaco and premiered in May 2015. The video features Lynch giving a live performance to a large audience.

== Live performance ==
On September 2, 2015 Lynch performed the song on NBC's Today.

== Chart performance ==
"Hell of a Night" debuted at number 99 on the Billboard Hot 100 the week of June 20, 2015. Twelve weeks later, it reached number 55 the week of September 12, staying on the chart for sixteen weeks. The song has sold 295,000 copies in the US as of September 2015. On January 29, 2016 "Hell of a Night" was certified Gold by the RIAA, denoting sales of over 500,000 units in the United States. In Canada, the track debuted at number 99 on the Canadian Hot 100 the week of August 15, peaked at number 95 the week of August 29, and remained on the chart for four weeks.

Chart (2014–2015)	Peak position
Canada Hot 100 (Billboard)	95
Canada Country (Billboard)	8
US Billboard Hot 100	55
US Country Airplay (Billboard)	1
US Hot Country Songs (Billboard)	7

=== Year-end charts ===
Chart (2015)	Position
US Country Airplay (Billboard)	4
US Hot Country Songs (Billboard)	32

== Certifications ==
Region	Certification	Certified units/sales
United States (RIAA)	Gold	500,000^{‡}
^{‡} Sales+streaming figures based on certification alone.

== See also ==
- List of Billboard number-one country songs of 2015
