= Where It's At (Dustin Lynch album) =

Second studio album by American country music artist Dustin Lynch

Studio album by Dustin Lynch
- Released: September 9, 2014
- Recorded: 2014
- Genre: Country
- Length: 50:16
- Label: Broken Bow
- Producer: Mickey Jack Cones; Brett Beavers; Luke Wooten

Dustin Lynch chronology
Dustin Lynch (2012)	Where It's At (2014)	Current Mood (2017)

Singles from Where It's At
- 1. "Where It's At" Released: March 31, 2014; 2. "Hell of a Night" Released: November 3, 2014; 3. "Mind Reader" Released: September 28, 2015

Where It's At is the second studio album by American country music artist Dustin Lynch. It was released on September 9, 2014, by Broken Bow Records. Mickey Jack Cones produced 12 of the 15 songs with Brett Beavers and Luke Wooten co-producing 3 of the 15. Lynch co-wrote five of the album's fifteen tracks. The album's first single, "Where It's At", was released to country radio on March 31, 2014 and became his first number one single on the Country Airplay chart. The album's second single, "Hell of a Night", was released to country radio on November 3, 2014. and became his second number one single on the Country Airplay chart. The album's third single, "Mind Reader", was released to country radio on September 28, 2015, and became his third number one single on the Country Airplay chart.

== Commercial performance ==
The album debuted at number 8 on the Billboard 200 chart, and number 2 on the Top Country Albums chart with 31,000 copies sold in its first week. The album has sold 138,700 copies in the US as of May 2016.

== Track listing ==
All tracks produced by Mickey Jack Cones except 3, 10 and 14, produced by Brett Beavers and Luke Wooten.

No.	Title	Writer(s)	Length
1.	"Hell of a Night"	Zach Crowell; Adam Sanders; Jaron Boyer	3:10
2.	"To the Sky"	Dustin Lynch; Ashley Gorley; Crowell	3:25
3.	"Halo"	Gorley; Matt Jenkins; Jimmy Robbins	3:20
4.	"After Party"	Steve Bogard; Jonathan Edwards; Jason Sever	3:15
5.	"Where It's At"	Cary Barlowe; Crowell; Jenkins	3:24
6.	"Mind Reader"	Rhett Akins; Ben Hayslip	3:05
7.	"Right Where We Want It"	Marv Green; Akins	3:05
8.	"She Wants a Cowboy"	Lynch; Tim Nichols; Josh Leo	3:08
9.	"Sing It to Me"	Lynch; Robbins; Josh Osborne	3:19
10.	"All Night"	Matt Ramsey; Jenkins; Trevor Rosen	2:57
11.	"World to Me"	Matt Rogers; Ash Bowers; Adam Craig	3:29
12.	"Middle of Nowhere"	Lynch; Crowell; Gorley	3:51
13.	"What You Wanna Hear"	Hayslip; Akins; Gorley	3:31
14.	"Your Daddy's Boots"	Lynch; Leo; Nichols	3:50
15.	"American Prayer"	Wendell Mobley; Green; Jim Collins	3:27
Total length:			50:16

== Personnel ==
- Jimmy Carter – bass guitar
- Mickey Jack Cones – acoustic guitar, electric guitar, percussion, programming, synthesizer, background vocals
- J.T. Corenflos – electric guitar
- Zach Crowell – percussion, programming, synthesizer, synthesizer bass
- Larry Hall – string arrangements, conductor
- Tommy Harden – drums
- Tony Harrell – keyboards
- Wes Hightower – background vocals
- Mark Hill – bass guitar
- Matt Jenkins – background vocals
- Mike Johnson – pedal steel guitar
- Troy Lancaster – electric guitar
- B. James Lowry – banjo, acoustic guitar
- Dustin Lynch – lead vocals, background vocals
- Jerry McPherson – electric guitar
- Jimmy Robbins – programming
- Mike Rojas – keyboards, organ, synthesizer
- Bryan Sutton – acoustic guitar, mandolin
- Russell Terrell – background vocals
- Brady Tilow – percussion, programming
- Lonnie Wilson – drums, percussion, programming
- Casey Wood – percussion, programming
- Luke Wooten – electric guitar, background vocals

== Charts ==
=== Weekly charts ===
Chart (2014–15)	Peak position
Canadian Albums (Billboard)	23
US Billboard 200	8
US Top Country Albums (Billboard)	2
US Independent Albums (Billboard)	3

=== Year-end charts ===
Chart (2014)	Position
US Top Country Albums (Billboard)	63
US Independent Albums (Billboard)	31
Chart (2015)	Position
US Top Country Albums (Billboard)	55

=== Singles ===
Year	Single	Peak chart positions				
Year	Single	US Country	US Country Airplay	US	CAN Country	CAN
2014	"Where It's At (Yep, Yep)"	4	1	42	4	67
2014	"Hell of a Night"	7	1	55	8	95
2015	"Mind Reader"	8	1	57	8	—
