= Small Town Boy (song) =

2017 single by Dustin Lynch

Single by Dustin Lynch

from the album Current Mood
- Released: February 17, 2017
- Recorded: 2017
- Genre: Country; country pop
- Length: 3:26
- Label: Broken Bow
- Songwriters: Rhett Akins; Ben Hayslip; Kyle Fishman
- Producer: Zach Crowell

Dustin Lynch singles chronology
"Seein' Red" (2016)	"Small Town Boy" (2017)	"I'd Be Jealous Too" (2017)

"Small Town Boy" is a song recorded by American country music artist Dustin Lynch. It was released to country radio on February 17, 2017, as the second single from his third studio album, Current Mood.

== Background ==
The song was written by Rhett Akins, Kyle Fishman and Ben Hayslip and produced by Zach Crowell. They wrote the song while on Luke Bryan's annual Farm Tour around October 2016, and sent the song to Dustin Lynch in November. Lynch listened to the song while on a hunt and decided to record it for his third album.

The song was first released for sale on February 17, 2017, and then to radio with an add date of March 20, 2017.

== Commercial reception ==
The song reached No. 1 on Billboard's Country Airplay chart in September 2017, which is Lynch's fifth No. 1 on the chart. It stayed at No. 1 for four weeks on the chart. It also peaked at No. 2 on Billboard's Hot Country Songs for chart dated August 19, 2017. The song was certified Gold by the RIAA on July 21, 2017, and Platinum on January 19, 2018, for a million units in sales and streams. It has sold 497,000 copies in the United States as of January 2018.

== Music video ==
The music video premiered on June 9, 2017, to a crowd at Nissan Stadium during 2017's CMA Fest as well as to a Vevo audience. In the video, Lynch is featured with Australian actress Claire Holt as the two enjoy their love for each other, throughout the day and night, on a beach. It was filmed on El Matador Beach in Malibu, CA.

== Charts ==
=== Weekly charts ===
Chart (2017)	Peak position
Canada Hot 100 (Billboard)	69
Canada Country (Billboard)	1
US Billboard Hot 100	36
US Country Airplay (Billboard)	1
US Hot Country Songs (Billboard)	2

=== Year-end charts ===
Chart (2017)	Position
Canada Country (Billboard)	16
US Billboard Hot 100	94
US Country Airplay (Billboard)	2
US Hot Country Songs (Billboard)	5

=== Decade-end charts ===
Chart (2010–2019)	Position
US Hot Country Songs (Billboard)	20

=== Certifications ===
Region	Certification	Certified units/sales
Canada (Music Canada)	Platinum	80,000^{‡}
New Zealand (RMNZ)	Gold	15,000^{‡}
United States (RIAA)	5× Platinum	5,000,000^{‡} / 497,000
^{‡} Sales+streaming figures based on certification alone.
