= Cowboys and Angels (Dustin Lynch song) =

Single by Dustin Lynch

from the album Dustin Lynch
- Released: January 16, 2012
- Recorded: 2011
- Genre: Country
- Length: 3:47
- Label: Broken Bow
- Songwriters: Dustin Lynch; Josh Leo; Tim Nichols
- Producers: Brett Beavers; Luke Wooten

Dustin Lynch singles chronology
"Cowboys and Angels" (2012)	"She Cranks My Tractor" (2012)

"Cowboys and Angels" is a debut song recorded by American country music artist Dustin Lynch. It was released in January 2012 as the first single from his self-titled debut album. Lynch co-wrote the song with Josh Leo and Tim Nichols.

== Content ==
The song is a mid-tempo in the key of B-flat major, although it ends on an E♭^{M7} chord. Its verse are in alternating measures of 3/4 and 4/4 time signatures, with a chorus mainly in 4/4 time. It is mainly accompanied by guitars and light percussion.

In it, the male narrator compares his personality to that of his lover, saying that the two are like "cowboys and angels".

== Critical reception ==
Billy Dukes of Taste of Country gave the song four stars out of five, praising Lynch's "sturdy voice" while saying that the chorus "showcases his natural talent." The song also received a favorable review from Matt Bjorke of Roughstock, who wrote that Lynch's "smooth baritone is clear and effective and the lyric is sweet and right on point."

== Music video ==
The music video was directed by Peter Zavadil and filmed in Elgin, Texas. It premiered in April 2012 as part of CMT Big New Music Weekend.

An acoustic music video was also filmed for the song, directed by Jessica Wardwell.

== Chart performance ==
"Cowboys and Angels" debuted at number 59 on the U.S. Billboard Hot Country Songs chart for the week of January 21, 2012. It reached number 2 on that chart in October, behind Jason Aldean's "Take a Little Ride". It also debuted at number 100 on the U.S. Billboard Hot 100 chart for the week of June 2, 2012 and at number 89 on the Canadian Hot 100 chart for the week of August 25, 2012.

Chart (2012)	Peak position
Canada Hot 100 (Billboard)	64
US Billboard Hot 100	40
US Country Airplay (Billboard)	2
US Hot Country Songs (Billboard)	2

=== Year-end charts ===
Chart (2012)	Position
US Country Songs (Billboard)	4

== Certifications ==
Region	Certification	Certified units/sales
United States (RIAA)	Platinum	1,000,000^{^}
^{^} Shipments figures based on certification alone.
