= Andy Albert =

American singer-songwriter

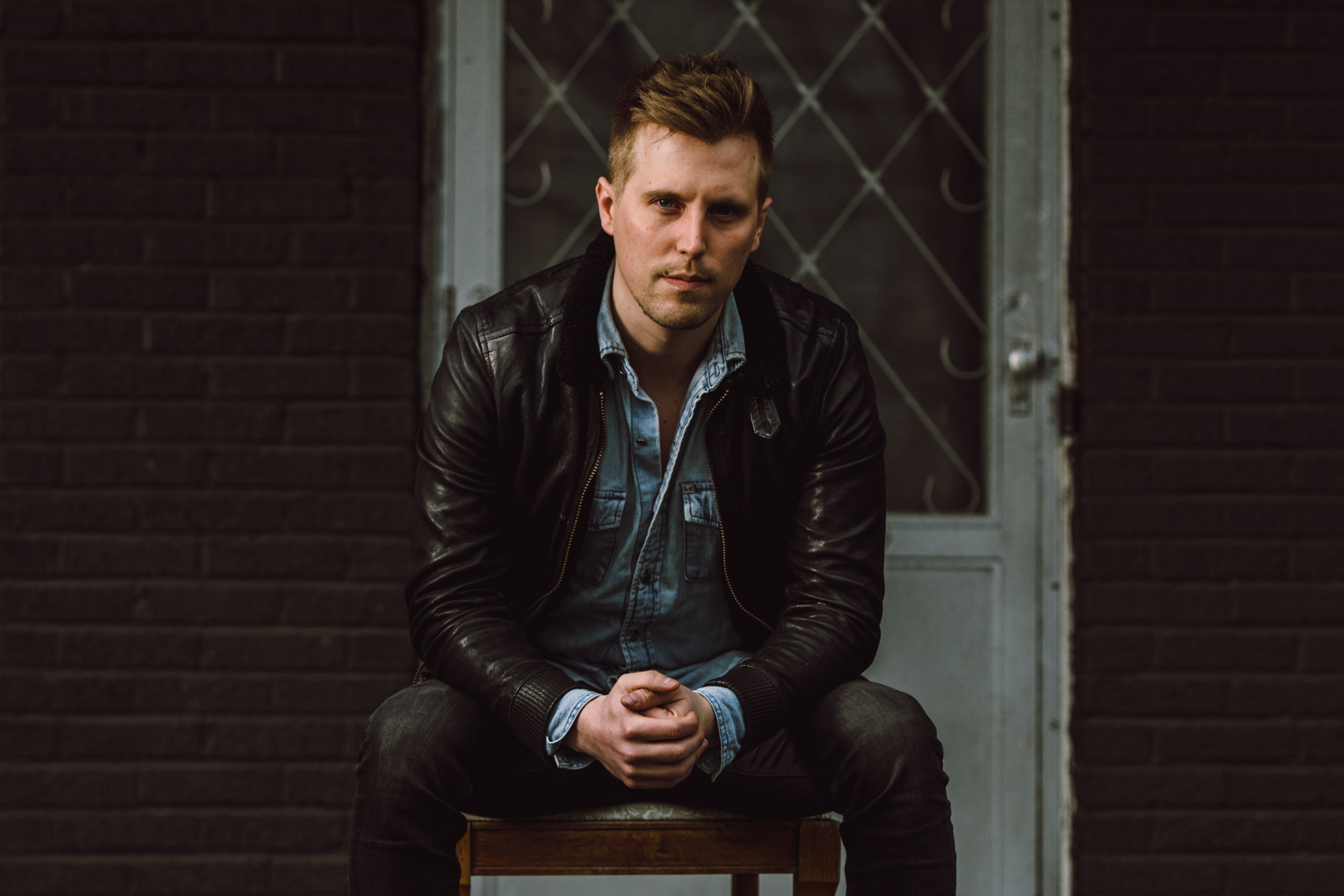
- Albert in 2016.

Background information
- Born: Andrew Paul Albert; Roswell, Georgia, United States
- Genres: Country, rock, pop
- Occupations: Songwriter, singer, record producer, musician
- Instruments: Vocals, guitars
- Years active: 2006-present
- Formerly of: Holiday Parade

Andrew Paul Albert is an American country music singer and songwriter originally from the Metro Atlanta. His songwriting repertoire includes writing for artists such as Blake Shelton, Dustin Lynch, Dan + Shay, Lainey Wilson, and Carrie Underwood.

Albert grew up in Roswell and moved to Nashville, Tennessee, in 2011. He signed a publishing deal with Downtown Music in 2014, and currently writes for Concord Music Publishing. Prior to moving to Nashville he was in the pop-rock band Holiday Parade from 2004 to 2011 and Bonaventure in 2011 with Dan Smyers. He has written multiple #1 songs at country radio, and had over 300 songs placed and recorded.

Albert was the Country First Place Winner of the American Songwriter 2023 Song Contest.

== Selected writing discography ==
2015

- Devin Dawson – “Blind Man” (Neon Cross) (writer)

2016

- Blake Shelton - "She's Got A Way With Words" (writer) *single
- Granger Smith - "If the Boot Fits" (writer) *single
- Nick Fradiani - "All On You" (writer) *single
- Chris Lane - "All About You" (writer)
- Dylan Schneider - "Want You Back"
- Kris Allen – “Letting You In” (Dogbear Records) (writer)
- 'Nashville’ (TV show) soundtrack – “From Here On Out” (writer)
- Walker McGuire – “Mama’s Kitchen Table”

2017

- Steve Moakler - "School" (writer)
- Granger Smith - "Happens Like That" "Still Holds Up" "Stutter" "Never Too Old" (writer)
- Petric - "Play It Safe" (writer)
- Shawn Austin - "Paradise Found" (writer)
- Mitchell Tenpenny - "Truck I Drove In High School" "Mixed Drinks" "Laid Back" "If The Boot Fits" (writer)
- Dustin Lynch - "State Lines" (writer)
- Chris Lane - "One Girl" (writer)
- Brett Kissel - "Between You And Me" (writer)

2018

- Aaron Pritchett - "Worth a Shot" (writer)
- Dustin Lynch - "Good Girl" (writer)
- Carrie Underwood - "The Bullet" (writer)
- Jordan Rager - "Georgia Boy" (writer)
- Hardy - "Rednecker" (writer)
- Devin Dawson - "Dark Horse" (writer)
- Walker McGuire - "18 Forever" (writer)
- Hunter Hayes - "This Girl" (writer)
- Dan + Shay - "Island Time" (writer)
- Mitchell Tenpenny - "All On You" (writer)
- Mitchell Tenpenny - "Goner" (writer)
- John King - "Ride Forever" (writer)
- Chris Bandi - "Rain Man" (writer)
- Matt Lang - "Love Me Some You" (writer)

2019

- Wilder Woods - "Sure Ain't" (writer)
- Granger Smith - "Holler" "Heaven Bound Balloons" (writer)
- Cassadee Pope - "I've Been Good" (writer)

2020

- Dustin Lynch - "Thinking 'Bout You (Featuring Lauren Alaina)" (writer)
- Dan + Shay - "Take Me Home For Christmas" (writer)
- Dan + Shay - "Christmas Isn't Christmas" (writer)

2023

- Hardy - "The Redneck Song" (writer)

2024

- Brett Kissel – "Another One" (writer)
