= Dustin Lynch =

American country music singer

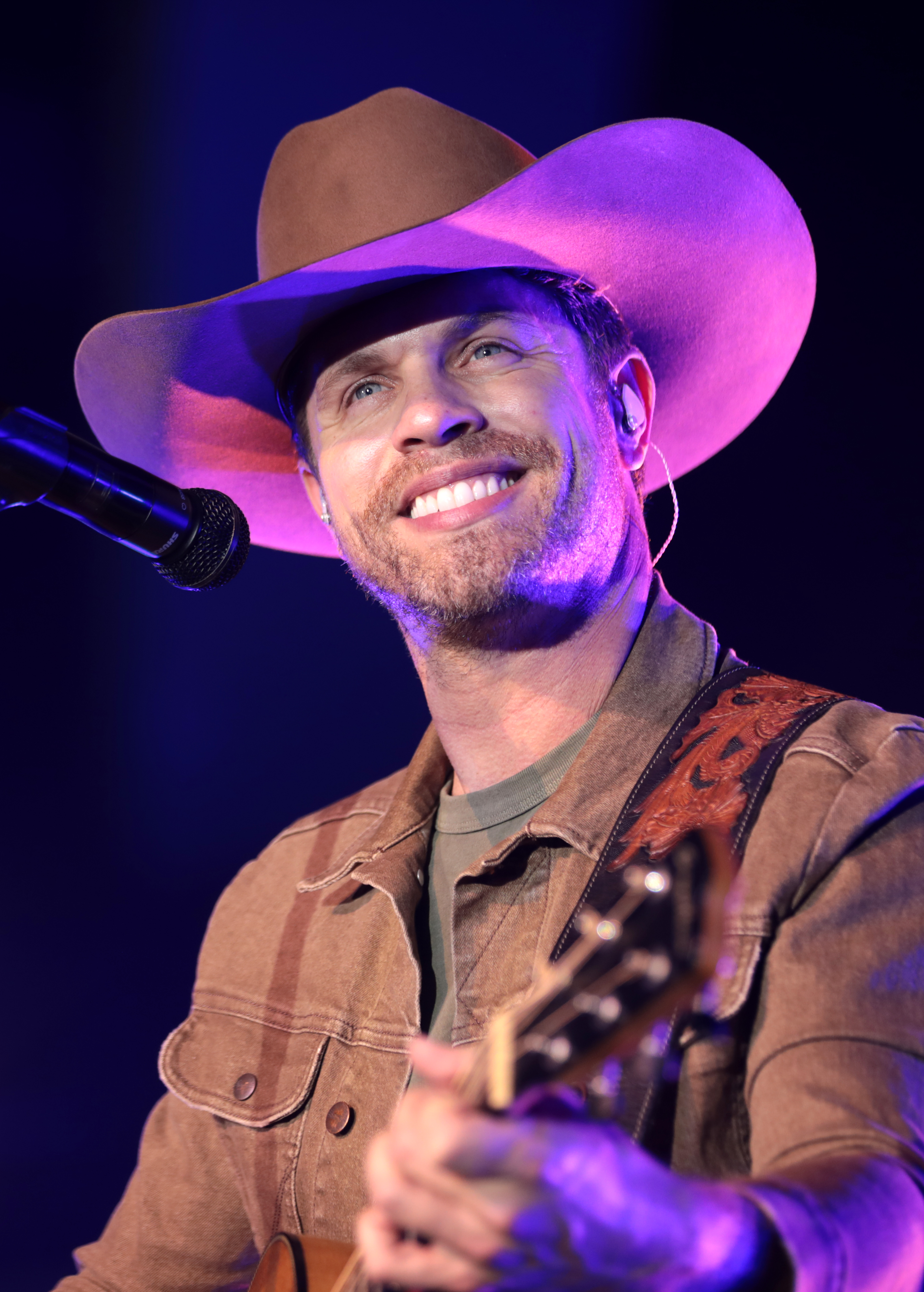
- Lynch in 2021

Background information
- Born: Dustin Charles Lynch; May 14, 1985 (age 41); Tullahoma, Tennessee, U.S.
- Genre: Country
- Occupations: Singer; songwriter
- Instruments: Vocals; guitar
- Years active: 2011–present
- Label: Broken Bow
- Website: dustinlynchmusic.com

Dustin Charles Lynch (born May 14, 1985) is an American country music singer and songwriter, signed to Broken Bow Records. He has released seven albums, one EP, and eighteen singles, of which nine have reached number one on Country Airplay.

== Early life and education ==
Dustin Charles Lynch was born in Tullahoma, Tennessee, on May 14, 1985.

In 2003, Lynch graduated from Tullahoma High School. In 2007, Lynch graduated from Lipscomb University in Nashville, Tennessee with a B.S. degree in biology while also playing on the school's Men's Golf Team. He said he chose Lipscomb because it is located near the Bluebird Café where he would play and learn the craft of songwriting while attending college. Although Lynch said he was interested in going to medical school, he decided to pursue a career in music.

== Music career ==
Lynch said he started playing guitar when he was around 8 or 9 but soon abandoned it, and then picked it up again at 15. When he was 16, he performed at the Bluebird Café in Nashville on an open mic night and was well received by the audience, so he decided to start a band.

=== 2011–2013: Dustin Lynch ===
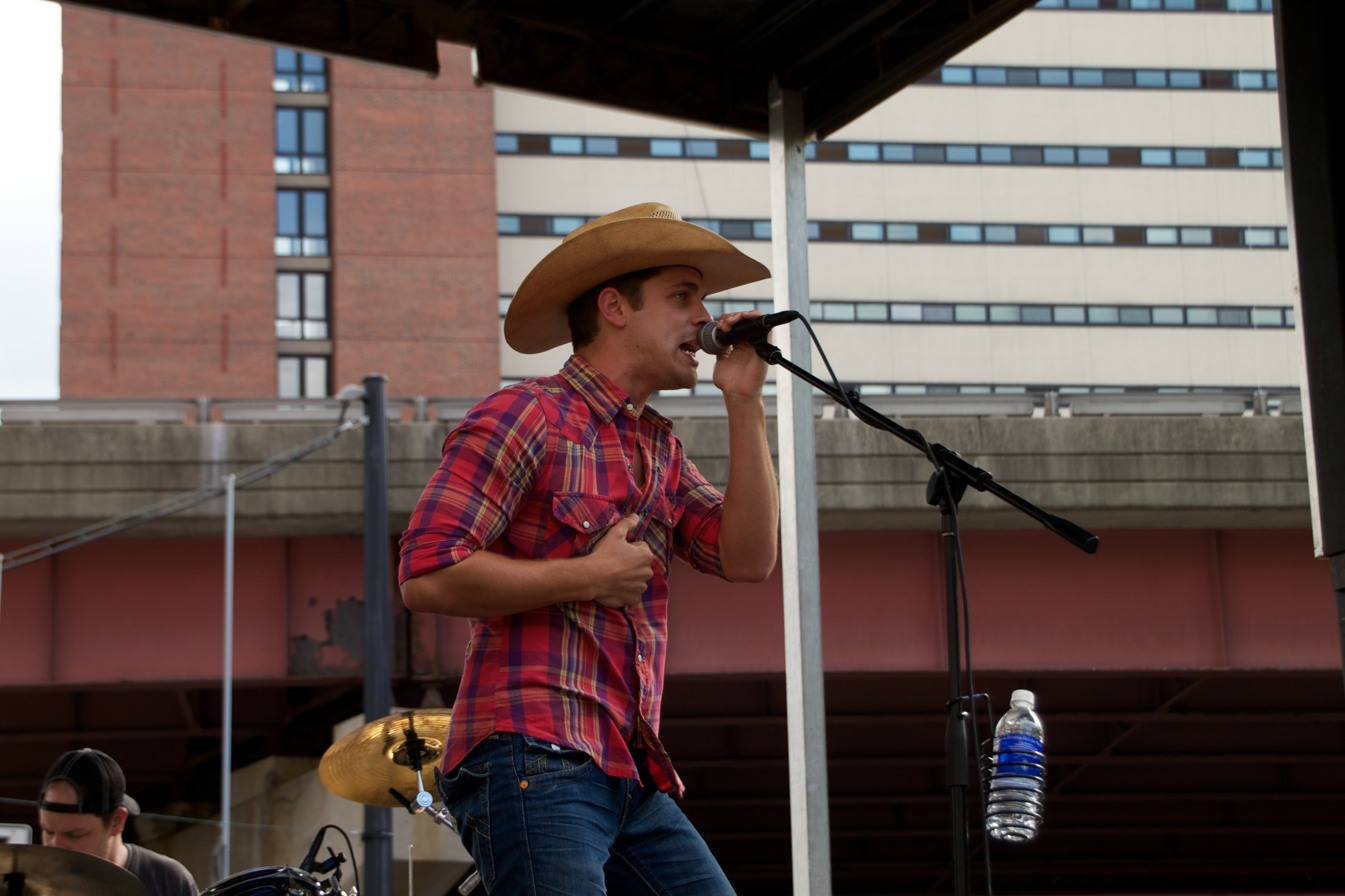
Dustin Lynch in 2013

Lynch was first signed to Valory Music Group and left to join Broken Bow Records in late 2011, following the same move by one of its executives. He released his debut single, "Cowboys and Angels" in January 2012. Lynch wrote the song with Josh Leo and Tim Nichols. That same month, Country Weekly began streaming his songs on its website.

The self-titled debut album, Dustin Lynch, was released in August 2012 and reached number one on the Top Country Albums chart. The album's second single, "She Cranks My Tractor", became his second top 20 hit in early 2013. It was followed by "Wild in Your Smile", which made the top 30.

Lynch co-wrote the song "Somebody Somewhere" by Dallas Smith, as well as James Wesley's 2013 single "Thank a Farmer".

=== 2014–2015: Where It's At ===
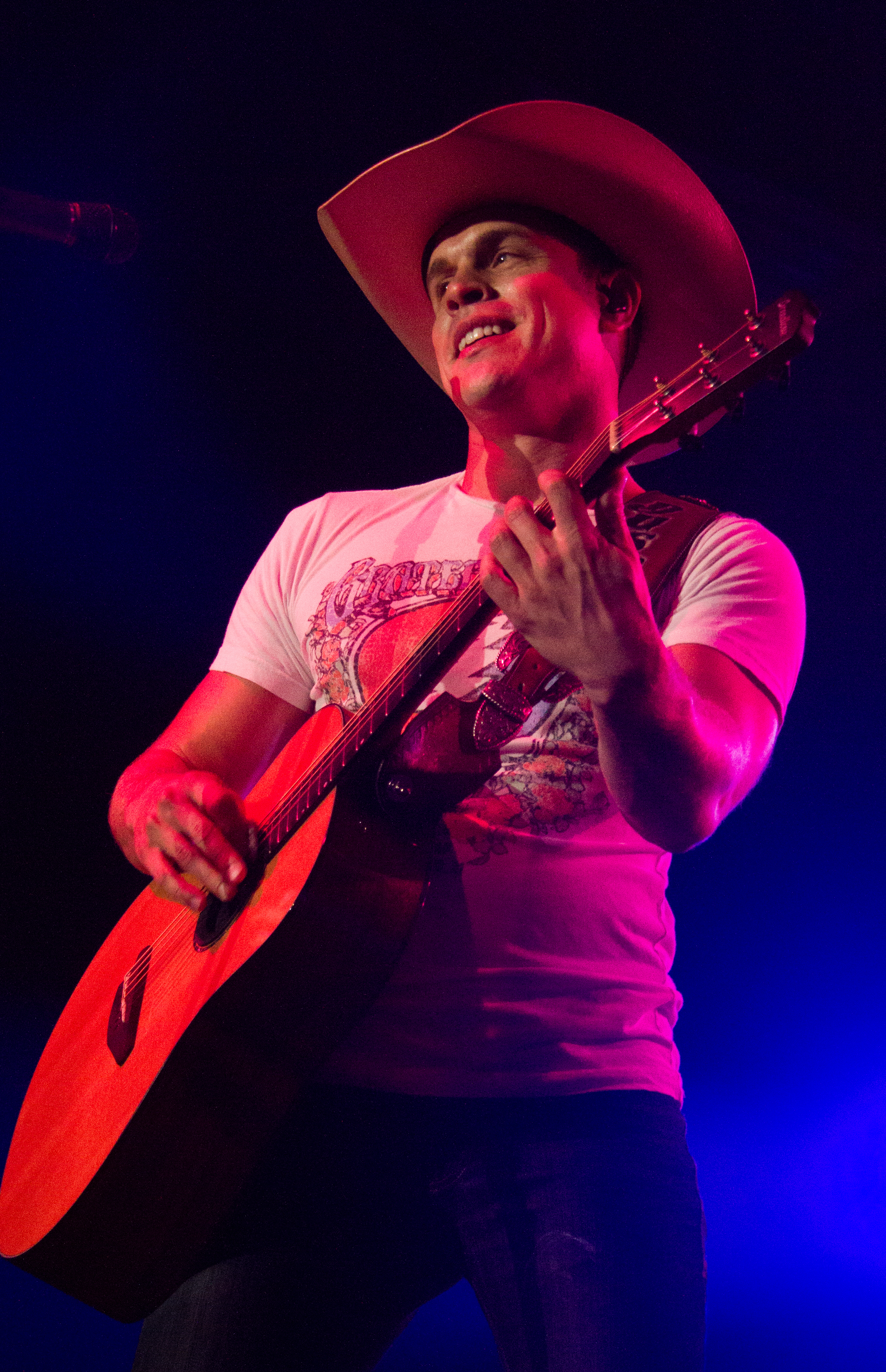
Dustin Lynch in concert in 2015

In early 2014, Lynch released his fourth single and the lead single from his second album, "Where It's At". It became his first number one single on the Country Airplay chart in September 2014, and the album of the same name was released on September 9, 2014. "Hell of a Night", and "Mind Reader" were released to country radio as the album's second and third singles, both of which also reached number one on the Country Airplay charts.

=== 2016–2021: Current Mood and Tullahoma ===
"Seein' Red" was released on July 11, 2016, as the lead single from Lynch's third studio album Current Mood. It hit number one on the Country Airplay chart for the week dated February 25, 2017. "Small Town Boy" was released on March 20, 2017, as the second single. Following the album's release on September 8, 2017, "I'd Be Jealous Too" was released on October 23, 2017, as the album's third single. It peaked at number 34 on the Country Airplay chart, becoming his lowest charting single of his career. It became his first single to miss the top 10 and to miss number one since "Wild in Your Smile" in 2014.

In November 2017, Lynch made an appearance at the Macy's Thanksgiving Day Parade, performing his hit single "Small Town Boy". On September 18, 2018, he was inducted into the Grand Ole Opry. He co-wrote Brett Kissel's 2018 hit "Guitars and Gasoline".

In May 2018, Lynch released the single "Good Girl". An EP entitled Ridin' Roads was released on March 8, 2019. Its title track was released to country radio, and reached number one on the Country Airplay in 2020. It would also become the second single from his fourth studio album, Tullahoma, which was released on January 17, 2020. The album's third single "Momma's House" was released to country radio on February 3, 2020. "Red Dirt, Blue Eyes" was released to country radio in Australia as the third single on March 30, 2020. A re-recorded version of "Thinking 'Bout You" featuring MacKenzie Porter was released to country radio in May 2021.

=== 2021–2025: Blue in the Sky and Killed the Cowboy ===
Ahead of his fifth studio album, Lynch released the promotional single "Tequila on a Boat" featuring Chris Lane, on May 14, 2021. The album, Blue in the Sky, was released on February 11, 2022, and features the single "Party Mode".

On September 8, 2023, Lynch released the song "Killed the Cowboy" as the lead single off his sixth album of the same name; it was released on September 29, 2023. In 2024, Lynch featured on the single "Broken Heart Thing" by his labelmate Madeline Merlo.

=== 2026–present: Clean Slate ===
On September 2, 2026, Lynch announced his upcoming seventh album Clean Slate. The album was released on October 30, 2026.

== Discography ==
- Dustin Lynch (2012)
- Where It's At (2014)
- Current Mood (2017)
- Tullahoma (2020)
- Blue in the Sky (2022)
- Killed the Cowboy (2023)
- Clean Slate (2026)

== Awards and nominations ==
Year	Association	Category	Result	Ref.
2012	American Country Awards	Single of the Year: New Artist – "Cowboys and Angels"	Won	
2012	American Country Awards	Music Video of the Year: New Artist – "Cowboys and Angels"	Won	
2014	Academy of Country Music Awards	Top New Artist of the Year	Won	
2018	CMT Music Awards	Male Video of the Year: "Small Town Boy"	Won	
2018	iHeartRadio Music Awards	Country Song of the Year: "Small Town Boy"	Won	
2020	Broadcast Music, Inc. (BMI)	BMI Country songwriter honoree: "Good Girl"	Won	
2020	Broadcast Music, Inc. (BMI)	BMI Country Top 50: "Ridin' Roads"	Won	
2025	Canadian Country Music Association	Musical Collaboration of the Year – "Broken Heart Thing" (with Madeline Merlo)	Won	
