= Eli Young Band discography =

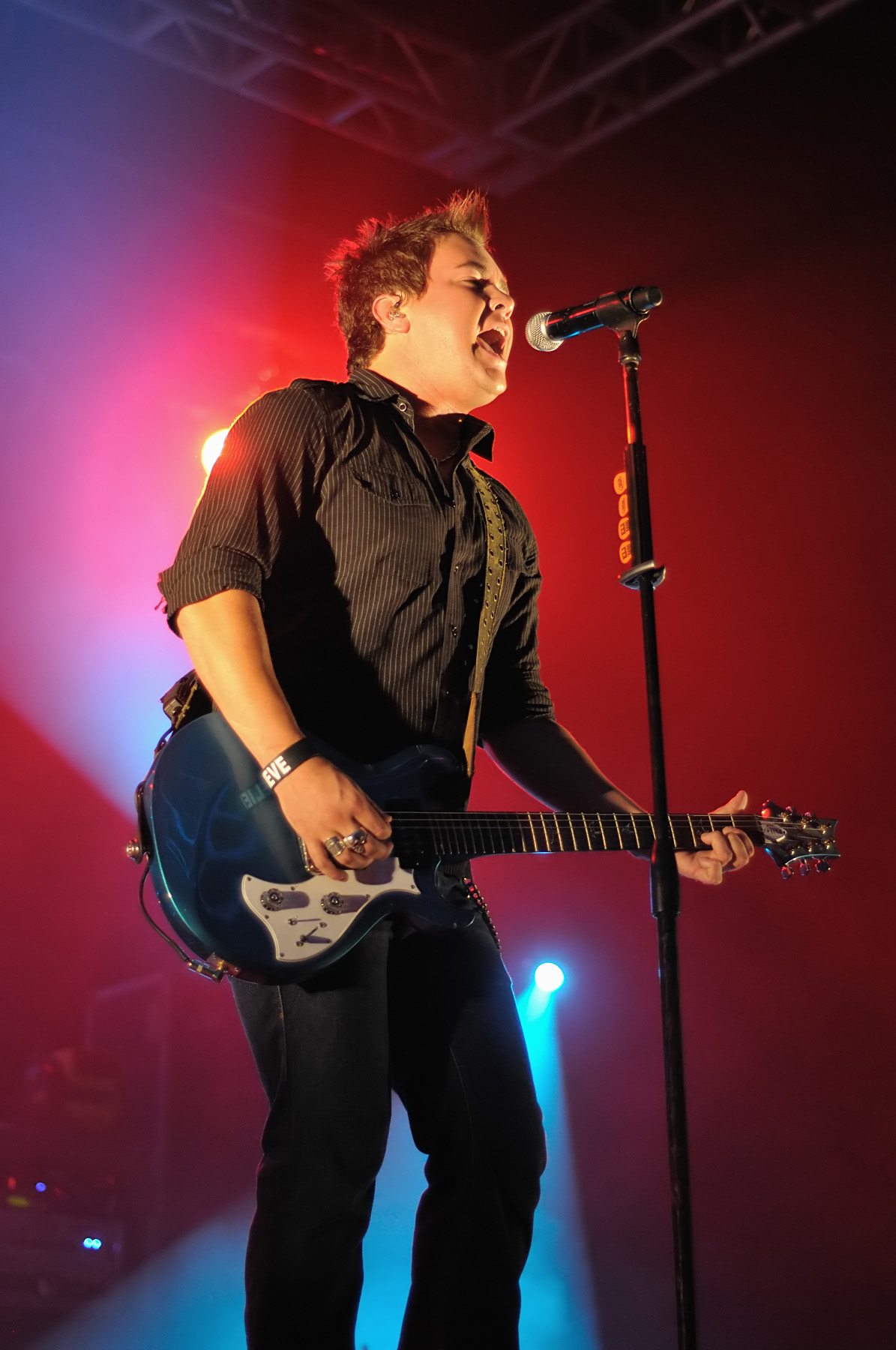
- Mike Eli
- Studio albums: 6
- EPs: 2
- Live albums: 1
- Compilation albums: 1
- Singles: 16
- Music videos: 17

Eli Young Band is an American country music band. Their discography comprises six studio albums, one live album, one compilation album, two extended plays, and sixteen singles.

== Albums ==
=== Studio albums ===
| Title | Album details | Peak positions | | Sales | Certifications |
| Title | Album details | US Country | US | Sales | Certifications |
|---|---|---|---|---|---|
| Level | Release date: April 5, 2005; Label: Carnival Records; Formats: CD, music download | — | — | | |
| Jet Black & Jealous | Release date: September 16, 2008; Label: Universal South Records; Formats: CD, music download | 5 | 30 | | |
| Life at Best | Release date: August 16, 2011; Label: Republic Nashville; Formats: CD, music download | 3 | 6 | | RIAA: Platinum |
| 10,000 Towns | Release date: March 4, 2014; Label: Republic Nashville; Formats: CD, music download | 1 | 5 | US: 95,000 | |
| Fingerprints | Release date: June 16, 2017; Label: Valory Music Co.; Formats: CD, music download | 17 | 116 | US: 11,100 | |
| Love Talking | Release date: June 3, 2022; Label: Valory Music Co.; Formats: CD, music download | — | — | | |
"—" denotes releases that did not chart

=== Live albums ===
| Title | Album details |
|---|---|
| Live at the Jolly Fox | Release date: November 14, 2006; Label: Carnival Records; Formats: CD, music download |

=== Compilation albums ===
| Title | Album details | Peak positions | Sales |
| Title | Album details | US Country | Sales |
|---|---|---|---|
| This Is Eli Young Band: Greatest Hits | Release date: March 29, 2019; Label: Big Machine Records; Formats: music download; CD; LP | 28 | US: 1,100 |

== Extended plays ==
| Title | Album details | Peak positions | | Sales |
| Title | Album details | US Country | US | Sales |
|---|---|---|---|---|
| Crazy Girl | Release date: May 3, 2011; Label: Republic Nashville; Formats: music download | 24 | 128 | |
| Turn It On | Release date: March 10, 2015; Label: Republic Nashville; Formats: music download | 11 | 113 | US: 7,100 |

== Singles ==
=== As lead artist ===
| Year | Single | Peak positions | | | | | Certifications | Album |
| Year | Single | US Country Songs | US Country Airplay | US | CAN Country | CAN | Certifications | Album |
|---|---|---|---|---|---|---|---|---|
| 2007 | "When It Rains" | 34 | | — | — | — | | Jet Black & Jealous |
| 2008 | "Always the Love Songs" | 11 | | 69 | — | — | RIAA: Gold | Jet Black & Jealous |
| 2009 | "Radio Waves" | 35 | | — | — | — | | Jet Black & Jealous |
| 2010 | "Guinevere" (Note: "Guinevere" charted at number 60 on Hot Country Songs as an album cut in 2009 before being officially released as a single in 2010.) | 45 | | — | — | — | | Jet Black & Jealous |
| 2011 | "Crazy Girl" | 1 | | 30 | 4 | 66 | MC: Gold; RIAA: 5× Platinum | Life at Best |
| 2012 | "Even If It Breaks Your Heart" | 1 | | 29 | 1 | 56 | RIAA: 3× Platinum | Life at Best |
| 2012 | "Say Goodnight" | 31 | 22 | — (Note: "Say Goodnight" did not enter the Billboard Hot 100, but peaked at number 10 on the Bubbling Under Hot 100 chart, which ranks the top 25 songs that have not yet reached the Hot 100.) | 44 | — | | Life at Best |
| 2013 | "Drunk Last Night" | 3 | 1 | 41 | 2 | 51 | RIAA: Platinum | 10,000 Towns |
| 2014 | "Dust" | 19 | 15 | 79 | 33 | — | RIAA: Gold | 10,000 Towns |
| 2015 | "Turn It On" | 42 | 37 | — | — | — | | Turn It On |
| 2016 | "Saltwater Gospel" | 43 | 41 | — | — | — | | Fingerprints |
| 2018 | "Love Ain't" | 8 | 1 | 50 | 1 | 71 | MC: Platinum; RIAA: 2× Platinum | This Is Eli Young Band: Greatest Hits |
| 2019 | "Break It In" | — | 39 | — | — | — | | Non-album singles |
| 2020 | "Saltwater Gospel (Fins Up Version)" (re-release with Jimmy Buffett) | — | 45 | — | — | — | | Non-album singles |
| 2022 | "Love Talking" | — | 47 | — | — | — | | Love Talking |
| 2023 | "Amy's Back in Austin" (with George Birge) | — | 59 | — | — | — | | Non-album single |
"—" denotes releases that did not chart

=== As featured artist ===
| Year | Single | Peak positions | | Album |
| Year | Single | US Country Songs | US Country Airplay | Album |
|---|---|---|---|---|
| 2015 | "Honey, I'm Good." (Andy Grammer featuring Eli Young Band) | 37 | 41 | Non-album single |

== Other charted songs ==
| Year | Single | Peak positions | Album |
| Year | Single | US Country Songs | Album |
|---|---|---|---|
| 2011 | "Wonderful Christmastime" | 33 | The Country Christmas Collection |
| 2014 | "Just Add Moonlight" | 47 | 10,000 Towns |

== Music videos ==
| Year | Video | Director |
|---|---|---|
| 2008 | "When It Rains" | The Brads |
| 2009 | "Always the Love Songs" | —N/a |
| 2010 | "Guinevere" | —N/a |
| 2011 | "Crazy Girl" | Mason Dixon |
| 2012 | "Even If It Breaks Your Heart" | Brian Lazzaro |
| 2012 | "Say Goodnight" | Brian Lazzaro |
| 2013 | "Drunk Last Night" | Brian Lazzaro |
| 2014 | "Dust" | Peter Zavadil |
| 2015 | "Turn It On" | Brian Lazzaro |
| 2016 | "Saltwater Gospel" | Peter Zavadil |
| 2017 | "Skin & Bones" | —N/a |
| 2018 | "Love Ain't" | Jeff Ray |
