= Will Hoge discography =

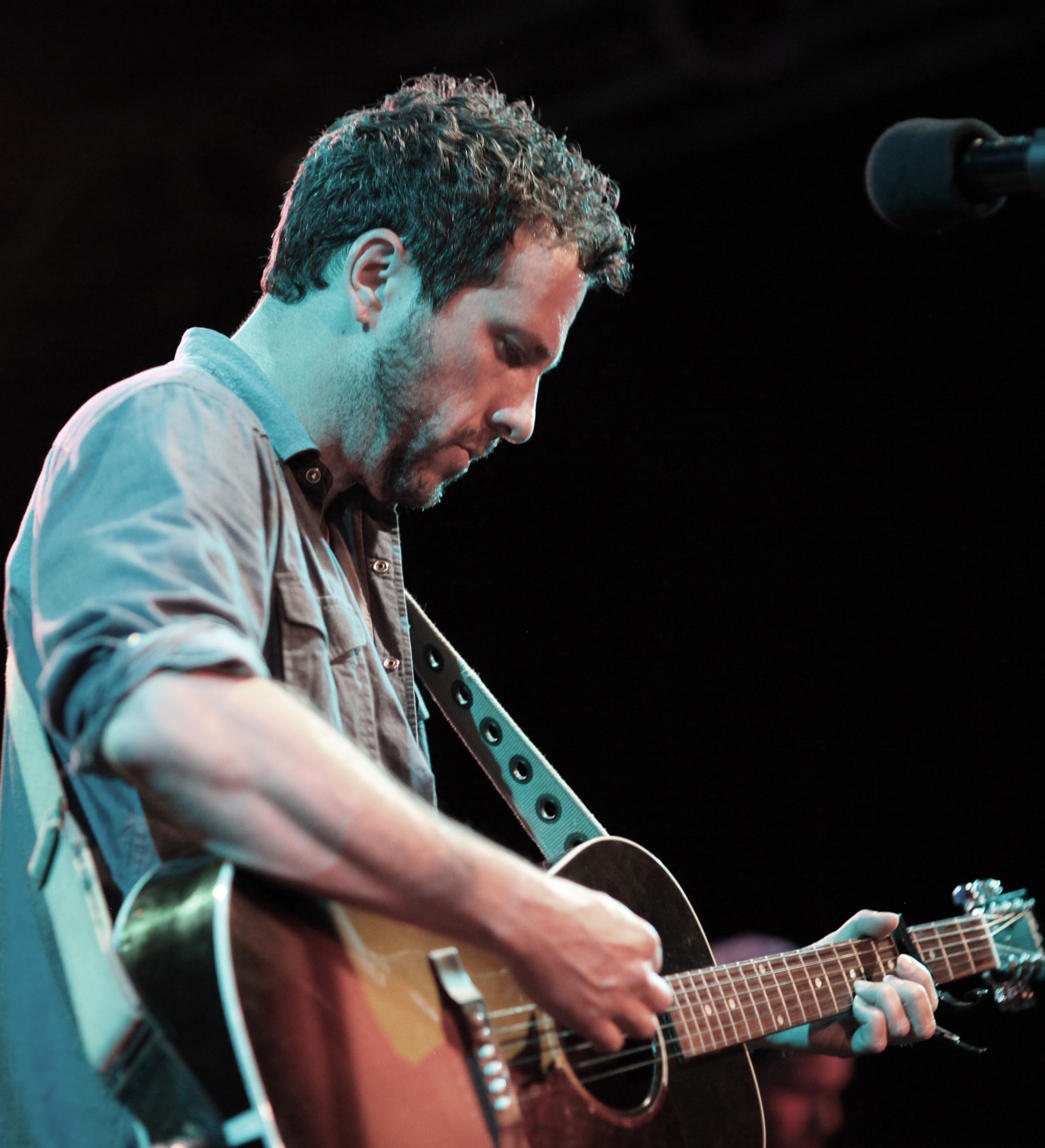
- Studio albums: 14
- EPs: 3
- Live albums: 5
- Singles: 6
- Music videos: 6

Will Hoge is an American country music artist. His discography consists of fourteen studio albums, three extended plays, five live albums and six singles.

== Studio albums ==
Title	Album details	Peak chart positions					Sales
Title	Album details	US Country	US	US Heat	US Indie	Americana	Sales
Spoonful - Tales Begin to Spin	Release date: April 18, 1997; Label: self-released	—	—	—	—	—	—
Carousel	Release date: January 16, 2001; Label: self-released	—	—	—	—	—	—
Blackbird on a Lonely Wire	Release date: March 4, 2003; Label: Atlantic Records	—	—	—	—	—	—
The Man Who Killed Love	Release date: February 7, 2006; Label: self-released	—	—	—	—	—	—
Draw the Curtains	Release date: October 9, 2007; Label: Rykodisc	—	—	—	—	—	—
The Wreckage	Release date: September 29, 2009; Label: Rykodisc	—	—	16	—	—	—
Number Seven	Release date: September 27, 2011; Label: Rykodisc	—	—	12	—	—	—
Never Give In	Release date: October 15, 2013; Label: Cumberland Recordings	23	129	1	31	—	—
Small Town Dreams	Release date: April 7, 2015; Label: Cumberland Recordings	15	162	4	16	—	US: 3,700
Anchors	Release date: August 11, 2017; Label: EDLO Records	—	—	6	14	—	US: 1,900
My American Dream	Release date: October 5, 2018; Label: EDLO Records	12	—	—	—	25	—
Tiny Little Movies	Release date: June 26, 2020; Label: EDLO Records	11	—	—	—	15	—
Wings on My Shoes	Release date: August 26, 2022; Label: EDLO Records	—	—	—	—	—	—
Tenderhearted Boys	Release date: April 12, 2024; Label: EDLO Records	—	—	—	—	—	—
"—" denotes releases that did not chart

== Extended plays ==
Title	Album details
The America EP	Release date: 2004; Label: self-released
The Living Room Sessions	Release date: October 12, 2010; Label: Rykodisc
Modern American Protest Music	Release date: September 18, 2012; Label: self-released
My American Dream	Release date: October 5, 2018; Label: EDLO Records

== Live albums ==
Title	Album details
All Night Long: Live at the Exit/In	Release date: July 7, 2000; Label: self-released
Almost Alone (Live at Smith's Olde Bar)	Release date: 2003; Label: self-released
During the Before and After	Release date: 2005; Label: self-released
Live in Charleston	Release date: 2006; Label: self-released
Again Somewhere Tomorrow	Release date: 2007; Label: self-released
Solo & Live: December 2015	Release date: 2016; Label: self-released

== Singles ==
Year	Single	Peak chart positions			Album
Year	Single	US Country	US Country Airplay	CAN	Album
2003	"Be the One"	—	—	—	Blackbird on a Lonely Wire
2003	"Secondhand Heart"	—	—	—	Blackbird on a Lonely Wire
2009	"Even If It Breaks Your Heart"	—	—	—	The Wreckage
2011	"When I Get My Wings"	—	—	—	Number Seven
2013	"Strong"	42	41	89	Never Give In
2013	"Another Song Nobody Will Hear" (featuring Wade Bowen)	—	—	—	Non-Album Track
2014	"Middle of America"	—	53	—	Small Town Dreams
2015	"Still a Southern Man"	—	—	—	Non-Album Track
"—" denotes releases that did not chart

=== Guest singles ===
Year	Single	Artist	Album
2015	"My Bed"	Sunny Sweeney	Provoked

== Music videos ==
Year	Video	Director
2009	"Even If It Breaks Your Heart"	
2010	"Favorite Waste of Time"	Paper Beats Rock
2011	"When I Get My Wings"	Joey Ciccoline
2013	"Strong"	Robert Richardson
2014	"Middle of America"	Colin Noel
2015	"My Bed" (with Sunny Sweeney)	Michael Ponce
2018	"Gilded Walls"	Stacie Huckeba
2020	"Even the River Runs Out of This Town"	Roman White

== Album appearances ==
Year	Song	Artist	Album
1999	"Sunshine Burn"	—	Hear and Now
2001	"Ms. Williams"	—	Aware Compilation, Vol. 8
2001	"Let Me Be Lonely"	—	Live in the X Lounge IV
2006	"No Fair"	—	Kid Pan Alley
2009	"I'm Sorry Now"	—	Acoustic Lounge
2011	"With a Little Help from My Friends"	Shinedown	Somewhere in the Stratosphere
2011	"Catherine"	David Nail	The Sound of a Million Dreams
2013	"Shovel in Hand"	Amy Grant	How Mercy Looks from Here
2013	"Band on the Run"	—	Let Us In Americana: The Music of Paul McCartney
2014	"My Bed"	Sunny Sweeney	Provoked

== Songs written by ==
Year	Song	Artist	Album
2007	"Better Off Now"	Rachel Proctor	Only Lonely Girl
2011	"Even If It Breaks Your Heart"	Eli Young Band	Life at Best
2013	"Smile Alone"	Ted Russell Kamp	Night Owl
2013	"Better Off Now (That You're Gone)"	Lady Antebellum	Golden
