= This Is Eli Young Band: Greatest Hits =

Greatest hits album by Eli Young Band
- Released: March 29, 2019
- Genre: Country
- Length: 51:19
- Label: Big Machine
- Producer: Frank Liddell; Erik Herbst; Mike Wrucke; Eli Young Band; Justin Niebank; Dann Huff; Ross Copperman; Jeremy Stover

Eli Young Band chronology
Fingerprints (2017)	This Is Eli Young Band: Greatest Hits (2019)

This Is Eli Young Band: Greatest Hits is the first compilation album by American country music group Eli Young Band. It was released on March 29, 2019, via Big Machine Records.

== Content ==
The album includes several of the band's greatest hits, along with lesser-performing singles and album cuts that were fan favorites. The lead single from the album is "Love Ain't". The band announced the album on Facebook in early March 2019.

== Track listing ==
No.	Title	Writer(s)	Length
1.	"Love Ain't"	Ross Copperman, Ashley Gorley, Shane McAnally	3:07
2.	"Even If It Breaks Your Heart"	Will Hoge, Eric Paslay	3:40
3.	"Drunk Last Night"	Laura Veltz, Josh Osborne	3:40
4.	"Crazy Girl"	Lee Brice, Liz Rose	3:21
5.	"Always the Love Songs"	David Lee Murphy, George Ducas	3:43
6.	"Dust"	Jon Jones, James Young, Kyle Jacobs, Osborne	3:20
7.	"Saltwater Gospel"	Copperman, Nicolle Galyon, Gorley	3:07
8.	"Guinevere"	Mike Eli, James Young, Scooter Carusoe	4:49
9.	"Skin & Bones"	Eli, Phil Barton, Lori McKenna	4:01
10.	"When It Rains"	Young	4:16
11.	"Small Town Kid"	Eli, Chris Thompson	3:45
12.	"Highways and Broken Hearts"	Eli, Thompson	4:11
13.	"Where Were You"	Luke Dick, Matt Jenkins, Osborne	3:10
14.	"Crazy Girl" (acoustic version)	Brice, Rose	3:09

== Charts ==
=== Weekly charts ===
Chart (2019)	Peak position
US Top Country Albums (Billboard)	26

=== Year-end charts ===
Chart (2019)	Position
US Top Country Albums (Billboard)	57
