= Mucklewain =

Mucklewain: Southern American Rock Festival—A Celebration of Southern Music, Art, and Culture was a rock festival held in 2006 and 2007 in Tennessee, primarily featuring Southern rock music.

First held on August 19, 2006, at Whicker Park in Harriman, Tennessee, the first year included artists such as Steve Earle, Todd Snider, Will Hoge and Allison Moorer. In 2007, the festival expanded from one day to two, and moved to Pinewood, Tennessee.
