= Matthew Mayfield =

American musician (born 1983)

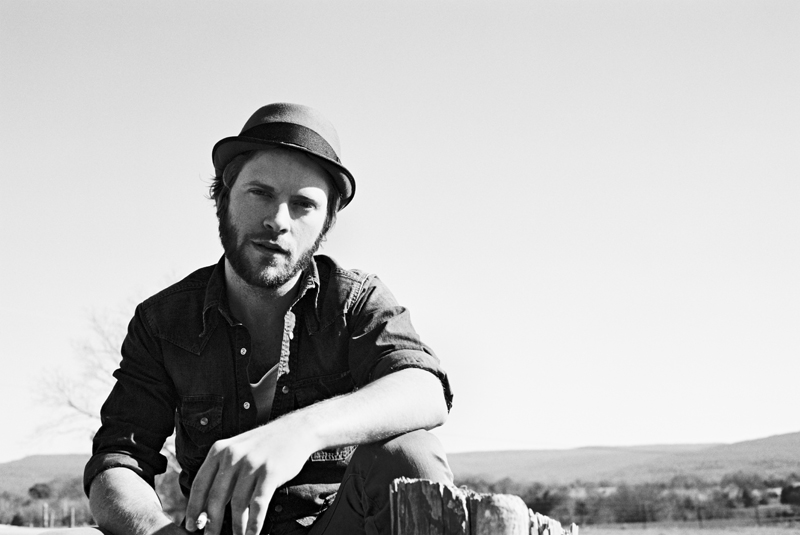

Background information
- Born: April 9, 1983 (age 43)
- Origin: Birmingham, Alabama, U.S.
- Genres: Rock, acoustic
- Website: matthewmayfield.com

Matthew Mayfield is an American singer and songwriter from Birmingham, Alabama. Originally the lead singer in the group Moses Mayfield, which disbanded in 2008, Mayfield has moved on to a solo career.

== Discography ==
Mayfield was originally the lead singer of Moses Mayfield. He announced the release of his debut EP as a solo artist, titled The Fire EP, on August 25, 2008.

Not long after the band broke up in 2008, Mayfield started playing shows centered on the Birmingham, Alabama area, usually solo acoustic but occasionally with a new backing band. Within a year, he independently released an album of acoustic songs, including acoustic versions of songs that previously appeared on the 2007 Moses Mayfield album The Inside. He also revealed that Moses Mayfield broke up mainly due to disagreements with the record label.

Between 2009 and 2010, Mayfield released five additional EPs (each one with a free song): "Five Chances Remain Hers" on July 27, 2009, "Maybe Next Christmas" on December 21, 2009, "Breathe Out In Black" on February 9, 2010, "Man-Made Machines" on March 16, 2010, and "You're Not Home" on April 17, 2010. After the 2010 SXSW Music and Media Conference, the music analytics website Next Big Sound ranked Mayfield at No. 6 in its top ten list of the artists with the fastest growing buzz at the event.

In 2010, Mayfield independently released his first full-length studio album, Now You're Free. With the release of the album, Mayfield has toured with such artists as Needtobreathe and Will Hoge.

In 2024, he provided vocals for "The Ballad of the Witches' Road (True Crime Version)" for the soundtrack of the Disney+ series Agatha All Along.

=== EPs ===
Independent releases:

- The Fire EP (2008)
1. Seasons In Our Dreams
2. Dead To You (free song)
3. By Your Side
4. The Devil Within
5. First In Line
6. Razorblade
7. Element
8. As Long As You're Not Leaving
- Five Chances Remain Hers (2009)
1. Open Road
2. Her Name Was December
3. Lives Entwined
4. Timeless Art
5. Better
6. Wrapped In Rain
- Maybe Next Christmas (2009)
1. Maybe Next Christmas (free song)
2. So Long, So Long
3. Her Name Was December
4. Better (Kensington Rd. Sessions) (free song)
5. Fact or Fable (Kensington Rd. Sessions)
6. Old Friend
7. Virginia Gray
- Breathe Out In Black (2010)
1. Can't Change My Mind (free song)
2. Simple
3. Breathe Out In Black
4. Ease Your Mind
5. Revelation (Live)
- Man-Made Machines (2010)
1. Man-Made Machines (free song)
2. Safe & Sound
3. A Cycle
4. Who Am I
5. Golden Opportunity
- You're Not Home (2010)
1. The Last Ride
2. Missed Me
3. Fire Escape (free song)
4. Still Alive
5. Out on Our Own
- Irons in the Fire (2013)
1. In or Out
2. Look Me in the Eye
3. Miles & Miles
4. Tonight (Remastered)
5. Follow You Down
6. Fire Escape (Catherine Marks Remix) (feat. John Paul White)
7. Miles & Miles (Acoustic + Strings)
8. Fire Escape (Remastered)

=== Studio albums ===
- Now You're Free (2011)
1. Come Back Home
2. Missed Me
3. Fire Escape
4. Man-Made Machines
5. Now You're Free
6. Element
7. Ghost
8. A Cycle
9. Tonight
10. Can't Change My Mind
11. Grow Old With You
- Now You're Free LP (2011) (Different track order)
1. Missed Me
2. Ghost
3. Come Back Home
4. Now You're Free
5. A Cycle
6. Grow Old With You
7. Fire Escape
8. Man-Made Machines
9. Element
10. Tonight
11. Can't Change My Mind
- A Banquet for Ghosts (2012)
1. Ain't Much More To Say
2. Take What I Can Get
3. Cold Winds
4. Track You Down
5. Heart In Wire
6. I Don't Know You At All
7. A Banquet For Ghosts
8. Carry Me
9. Always Be You
10. Beautiful
11. Safe And Sound
- Wild Eyes (2015)
1. Wild Eyes
2. Mess of a Man
3. Better Off Forgiven
4. Ride Away
5. On Your Knees
6. Why We Try (feat. Chelsea Lankes)
7. Tidal Wave
8. Quiet Lies
9. How To Breathe
10. Settle Down (feat. Amy Stroup)
- Recoil (2016)
1. History
2. Raw Diamond Ring
3. Indigo
4. Turncoat
5. God's Fault
6. Warfare on Repeat
7. Merry Go Round
8. Wolf in Your Darkest Room
9. Wreckage
10. Show Me
11. Long Way Down
- Gun Shy (2019)
1. Gun Shy
2. Our Winds
3. S.H.A.M.E.
4. Fall Behind
5. Best of Me
6. Broken Clocks
7. Keep My Distance
8. Blackballed
9. Table For One
10. When The Walls Break
11. Simple
- Prizefighter (2024)
1. Mirror Lake
2. Bell of the Ball
3. Undertow
4. Fumes
5. Breathe Out in Black
6. Monsters
7. Vendetta Moon
8. Hold Tight
9. Die in a Ghost Town
10. The Crown
11. Never Leave You Behind

== Press ==
- A Musician's Journey: From Moses Mayfield to Matthew Mayfield - Birmingham Magazine
- Matthew Mayfield's 'The Fire EP' Delivers Refreshing Sound - The Samford Crimson
- Choice Cuts In Depth: Matthew Mayfield - Indie-Music.com
- Artist Interview – Matthew Mayfield – Birmingham rocker describes rugged life on the road - EarToTheGround Music
