= Never Give In (Will Hoge album) =

Eighth studio album by Americana musician Will Hoge

Studio album by Will Hoge
- Released: October 15, 2013
- Genre: Americana, Southern rock, Alternative country
- Length: 36:06
- Label: Cumberland
- Producer: Will Hoge

Will Hoge chronology
Number Seven (2011)	Never Give In (2013)	Small Town Dreams (2015)

Singles from Never Give In
- 1. "Strong" Released: August 12, 2013

Never Give In is the eighth studio album by Americana musician Will Hoge, and the album's producer was Hoge. The album released on October 15, 2013 from Cumberland Records. The album achieved commercial success and critical acclamation.

== Background ==
The album was released on October 15, 2013 by Cumberland Records, and it was produced by Will Hoge, which was his eighth studio album.

== Promotion ==
The song "Strong" from the album was used by Chevrolet Silverado in one of their commercials.

== Music and lyrics ==
The album has been described as a mixture of rock and roll, country, Americana, and a version of Southern R&B.

== Critical reception ==
Professional ratings
Review scores
Source	Rating
AbsolutePunk	95%
Allmusic	4/5 stars
Got Country Online	5/5 stars
Roughstock	4.5/5 stars

Never Give In garnered critical acclaim from music critics. At Allmusic, Thom Jurek rated the album four stars, and noted how the release "abundantly captures" the musicians "strengths as both singer and songwriter." Craig Manning of AbsolutePunk rated the album a 95-percent, and he felt that "this record is the best one-album snapshot of who Hoge is as an musician." At Roughstock, Matt Bjorke rated the album four-and-a-half stars out of five, and evoked that the release was "well worth seeking out" because "Will Hoge balances everything that sums up what makes Nashville such an awesome place for musicians to live." Kimberly Owens of Got Country Online rated the album a perfect five stars, and highlighted that "This album proved to me that whatever Will Hoge sings, he never fails to bring true emotion to the lyrics, he never fails to put you on his level, and draw you in with the soulfulness of his voice."

== Chart performance ==
For the Billboard charting week of November 2, 2013, Never Give In was the No. 129 most sold album in the entirety of the United States via the Billboard 200 chart placement, and it was the No. 1 breaking-and-entry album by the Top Heatseekers Albums charting. Also, the album was the No. 23 sold Top Country Albums, and it was the No. 31 Independent Albums sold.

== Track listing ==
Tracklist
No.	Title	Writer(s)	Length
1.	"A Different Man"	Patrick Davis, Will Hoge	3:15
2.	"Goodbye Ain't Always Gone"	Dylan Altman, Rose Falcon, Hoge	3:12
3.	"Never Give In"	Altman, Hoge	3:00
4.	"This Time Around"	Altman, Hoge	3:41
5.	"Still Got You on My Mind"	Altman, Hoge	3:08
6.	"Home Is Where the Heart Breaks"	Hoge	3:24
7.	"Daddy Was a Gambling Man"	Hoge, Adam Ollendorff	2:57
8.	"Pale September"	Hoge	3:31
9.	"Bad Old Days"	Altman, Hoge	3:18
10.	"Damn Spotlight (Julia's Song)"	Hoge	3:16
11.	"Strong"	Hoge, Zach Crowell, Ashley Gorley	3:24
Total length:			36:06

== Personnel ==
- Jessi Alexander - background vocals
- Adam Beard - bass guitar
- Pat Buchanan - acoustic guitar
- Nick Buda - drums, percussion
- Tom Bukovac - acoustic guitar, electric guitar
- Ken Coomer - drums
- John Deaderick - organ, piano
- Kenny Greenberg - acoustic guitar, electric guitar
- Tony Harrell - organ, piano
- Will Hoge - acoustic guitar, lead vocals, background vocals
- Scotty Huff - background vocals
- Robert Kearns - bass guitar
- Kristen Kelly - background vocals
- Doug Lancio - acoustic guitar, electric guitar
- Ashley Monroe - background vocals
- Maureen Murphy - background vocals
- Jon Randall - background vocals
- Harmonie Reddick - background vocals
- Michael Webb - piano

== Charts ==
=== Album ===
Chart (2013)	Peak position
US Billboard 200	129
US Top Country Albums (Billboard)	23
US Heatseekers Albums (Billboard)	1
US Independent Albums (Billboard)	31

=== Singles ===
Year	Single	Peak chart positions		
Year	Single	US Country	US Country Airplay	CAN
2013	"Strong"	42	41	89
