= 10,000 Towns =

Studio album by Eli Young Band
- Released: March 4, 2014
- Genre: Country
- Label: Republic Nashville
- Producers: Eli Young Band; Frank Liddell; Justin Niebank

Eli Young Band chronology
Life at Best (2011)	10,000 Towns (2014)	Turn It On (2015)

Singles from 10,000 Towns
- 1. "Drunk Last Night" Released: July 1, 2013; 2. "Dust" Released: February 3, 2014

10,000 Towns is the fourth studio album by American country music group Eli Young Band. It was released on March 4, 2014 via Republic Nashville. The band wrote over half the tracks and co-produced the album with Frank Liddell and Justin Niebank. It includes the number one single "Drunk Last Night." An exclusive version of the album with three bonus tracks is available at Walmart.

== Background ==
Lead singer Mike Eli said of the album: "To still be making music and going through the craziness of life together is something we'd only dreamed of when we met back in college. This album shows another chapter in our lives as a band, as husbands, as fathers and as individuals that we're really excited to share with our amazing fans."

== Critical reception ==
Professional ratings
Review scores
Source	Rating
AllMusic	3/5 stars
Country Weekly	B
The Oakland Press	2.5/4 stars
Roughstock	4.5/5 stars
USA Today	3/4 stars

10,000 Towns has received positive reviews from music critics. At USA Today, Brian Mansfield rated the album three out of four stars, stating "That keeps their populist country and heartland rock from setting down roots, but lets these songs resonate everywhere." Stephen Thomas Erlewine of AllMusic rated the album three out of five stars, writing that "their strength lies in the sweeter stuff, how they can make crossover country-pop that seems amiable but never cloying." At The Oakland Press, Gary Graff rated the album two-and-a-half stars out of four, saying that the release "touts the virtues of lowest-common-denominator country, filled with sweet melodies, rich vocal harmonies and a careful straddle of the twang/rock divide to maintain its crossover candidacy." Bob Paxman of Country Weekly graded the album a B, and said that the release is "decent but not quite up to the level of those two powerhouses." At Roughstock, Matt Bjorke rated the album four-and-a-half stars out of five, saying that the album "suggests that [the] Eli Young Band has found the right formula for their sound."

== Track listing ==
No.	Title	Writer(s)	Length
1.	"Drunk Last Night"	Josh Osborne, Laura Veltz	3:40
2.	"10,000 Towns"	Rodney Clawson, Chris Tompkins, Craig Wiseman	3:45
3.	"Dust"	Jon Jones, James Young, Kyle Jacobs, Osborne	3:20
4.	"Angel Like You"	Heather Morgan, Liz Rose, Mike Eli	3:27
5.	"Let's Do Something Tonight"	Jimmy Robbins, David Lee Murphy, Jon Nite	3:37
6.	"Your Last Broken Heart"	Eli, Jones, Young, Sean McConnell	3:15
7.	"What Does"	Eli, Jones, Young, McConnell	4:21
8.	"A Lot Like Love"	Dylan Altman, Will Hoge	3:28
9.	"Just Add Moonlight"	Hoge, Jon Randall	3:16
10.	"Revelations"	Eli, Chris Thompson, Jones, Young, McConnell	3:45
11.	"Prayer for the Road"	Eli, Jones, Young, Thompson, Jacobs, Billy Montana	4:26

Walmart bonus tracks
No.	Title	Writer(s)	Length
12.	"Traces"	Eli, Thompson, Jones, Young, Lee Brice, Jacobs
13.	"June, July, August"	Jason Saenz, Jennifer Schott
14.	"The Moon's On Fire"	Lee Thomas Miller, Chris Stapleton, Al Anderson

== Personnel ==
Adapted from liner notes.

=== Eli Young Band ===
- Mike Eli- lead vocals
- Jon Jones- bass guitar, background vocals
- Chris Thompson- drums, percussion
- James Young- electric guitar, background vocals

=== Additional Musicians ===
- Tom Bukovac- electric guitar
- J.T. Corenflos- electric guitar
- Eric Darken- percussion
- Dan Dugmore- steel guitar
- Kenny Greenberg- acoustic guitar, electric guitar
- Tony Harrell- keyboards
- Wes Hightower- background vocals
- David Huff- programming
- Charlie Judge- accordion, Hammond B-3 organ, keyboards, piano, synthesizer, synthesizer strings, Wurlitzer
- Tony Lucido- bass guitar
- Jerry McPherson- electric guitar
- Heather Morgan- background vocals
- Greg Morrow- percussion
- Justin Niebank- keyboards, programming
- Russ Pahl- steel guitar
- Danny Rader- accordion, bouzouki, acoustic guitar, mandolin
- Cale Richardson- acoustic guitar, Hammond B-3 organ, piano
- Adam Shoenfeld- electric guitar
- Ilya Toshinsky- acoustic guitar

== Chart performance ==
10,000 Towns debuted at No. 5 on the Billboard 200 and No. 1 on the Top Country Albums chart with first week sales of 36,000 copies. The album has sold 95,000 copies in the U.S. as of January 2015.

=== Weekly charts ===
Chart (2014)	Peak position
US Billboard 200	5
US Top Country Albums (Billboard)	1

=== Year-end charts ===
Chart (2014)	Position
US Top Country Albums (Billboard)	49

=== Singles ===
Year	Single	Peak chart positions				
Year	Single	US Country	US Country Airplay	US	CAN Country	CAN
2013	"Drunk Last Night"	3	1	41	2	51
2014	"Dust"	19	15	79	33	—
"—" denotes releases that did not chart
