= Moses Mayfield =

American rock band

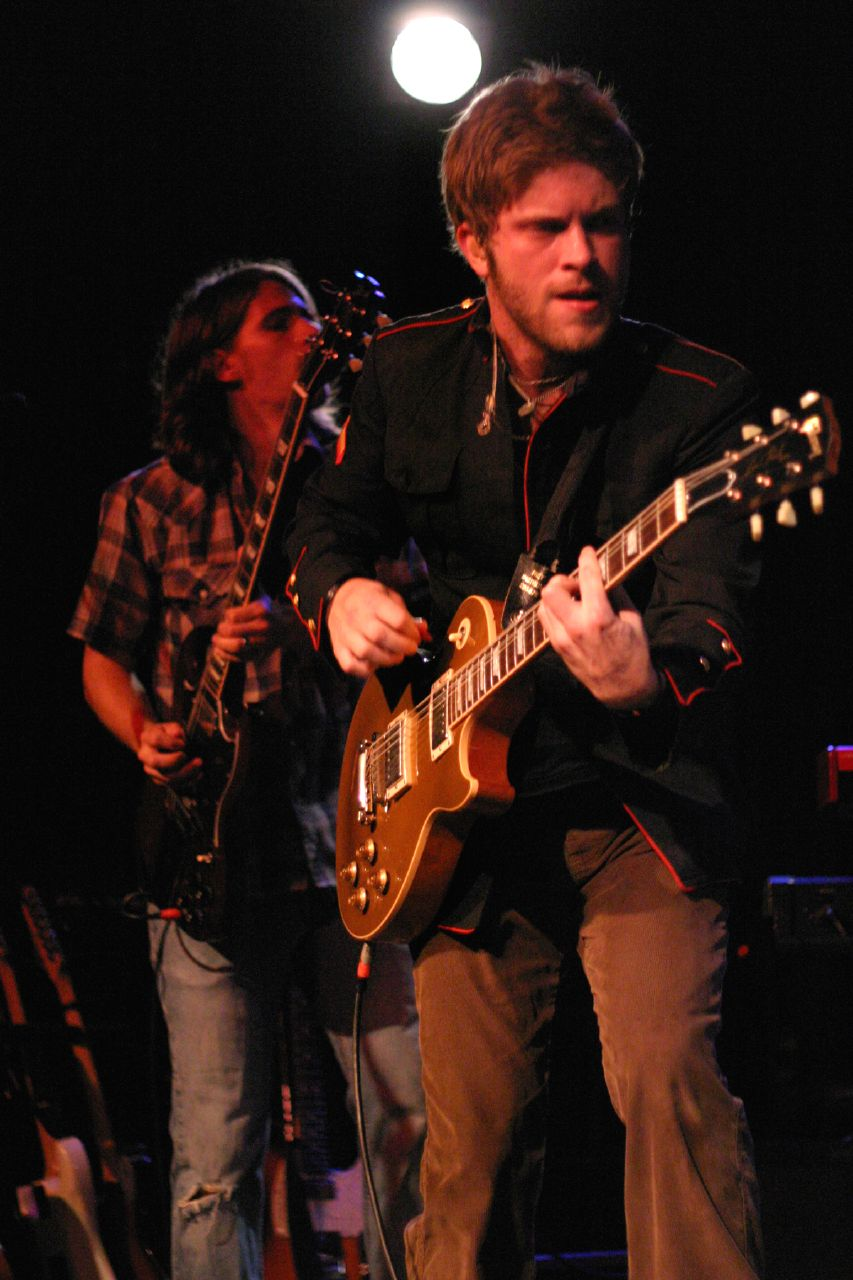

Background information
- Origin: Birmingham, Alabama, United States
- Genres: Rock, alternative rock
- Years active: 2002–2008
- Label: Columbia
- Members: Matthew Mayfield; Wil Drake; Hans Ford; Matthew Evan Taylor; Will Mason; Dave Taylor
- Website: Moses Mayfield

Moses Mayfield was a five-piece rock band from Birmingham, Alabama. Their major-label debut album, The Inside was released in March 2007 under Columbia Records and Sony BMG. The Inside reached No. 43 on the Billboard Heatseekers chart. Prior to the release of their first album, they opened for Switchfoot, The Fray, Will Hoge, Pete Yorn, Blue October, and many others on several different nationwide tours. In August 2007, original guitarist Will Mason announced his departure from the band and guitarist Dave Taylor joined the band in preparation for their upcoming album tour. The Inside failed to make a major splash in the market, so Moses Mayfield began to write in hopes of creating a follow-up to their critically acclaimed major label release. Unfortunately due to a realignment of personal goals the band decided to take an indefinite hiatus in December 2007.

Not long after the band broke up, lead singer Matthew Mayfield started playing shows centered on the Birmingham, AL and Huntsville, AL area, usually solo acoustic but occasionally with a new backing band. Within a year, he independently released an album of acoustic songs, including acoustic versions of songs that previously appeared on The Inside. He also revealed that Moses Mayfield called it quits mainly due to disagreements with the record label, as well as some members deciding they wanted to leave the band due to these disagreements. A combination of those two items led to the sudden break-up.

== Discography ==
=== Albums ===
- 2004: Enough to Let Go
- 2007: The Inside

=== EPs ===
- 2003: Unified
- 2006: The Live EP
