= Love Ain't =

Single by Eli Young Band

from the album This Is Eli Young Band: Greatest Hits
- Released: May 25, 2018
- Genre: Country
- Length: 3:06
- Label: Valory Music
- Songwriters: Ross Copperman; Ashley Gorley; Shane McAnally
- Producer: Dann Huff

Eli Young Band singles chronology
"Saltwater Gospel" (2016)	"Love Ain't" (2018)	"Break It In" (2019)

"Love Ain't" is a song recorded by American country music group Eli Young Band. It was released on May 25, 2018 as the first single from their compilation album This Is Eli Young Band: Greatest Hits. The song was written by Ross Copperman, Ashley Gorley and Shane McAnally.

== Content and history ==
"Love Ain't" is an original composition intended as a lead single to the band's first greatest-hits package, This Is Eli Young Band. It is their first single release since "Saltwater Gospel" in 2016.

== Music video ==
For the song's Jeff Ray-directed music video, the band consulted the Wounded Warrior Project to find "any couples that would be willing to tell their story". The video features Taylor Morris, a quadruple amputee soldier, and his wife. Lead singer Mike Eli told Billboard that "This teaches you what you should expect from the person who loves you and what you should expect from yourself."

== Chart performance ==
The song became the band's first number one in nearly six years, after "Drunk Last Night" reached the top of the Country Airplay chart in December 2013.

== Charts ==
=== Weekly charts ===
Chart (2018–2019)	Peak position
Canada Hot 100 (Billboard)	71
Canada Country (Billboard)	1
US Billboard Hot 100	50
US Country Airplay (Billboard)	1
US Hot Country Songs (Billboard)	8

=== Year-end charts ===
Chart (2019)	Position
US Country Airplay (Billboard)	29
US Hot Country Songs (Billboard)	49

== Certifications ==
Region	Certification	Certified units/sales
Canada (Music Canada)	Platinum	80,000^{‡}
United States (RIAA)	2× Platinum	2,000,000^{‡}
^{‡} Sales+streaming figures based on certification alone.
