= Draw the Curtains =

Studio album by Will Hoge
- Released: October 9, 2007
- Genre: Country
- Length: 41:18
- Label: Rykodisc
- Producer: Charlie Brocco; Ken Coomer

Will Hoge chronology
The Man Who Killed Love (2006)	Draw the Curtains (2007)	The Wreckage (2009)

Professional ratings
Review scores
Source	Rating
AllMusic	4/5 stars
AntiMusic	5/5 stars
Alternative Addiction	3.5/5 stars
American Songwriter	4/5 stars

Draw the Curtains is the fifth studio album by Will Hoge. It was released on October 9, 2007, by Rykodisc.

== Critical reception ==
Andrew Leahey of AllMusic writes that Will Hoge was, "touring America's smoky barroom circuit, inciting his audiences to alternately weep into their whiskeys and hit the dancefloor." and that, "Perhaps that's why his first offering on the Rykodisc label, Draw the Curtains, boasts the sort of informed authenticity that American Idol finalists can only seem to muster several years into their post-TV career. This is an album of countrified, bloodshot-eyed soul -- a difficult genre to execute, perhaps, but one that Hoge often nails."

Anthony Kuzminski of AntiMusic gives this album 5 smiley faces and concludes his review with, "The next time someone tells me 'they don't make albums like they used to', I'm going to tell them to buy Will Hoge's Draw the Curtains so they can have that same spiritual awakening."

Bill Clifford of JamBase says, "Nashville based Will Hoge has been one of America’s most under appreciated singer-songwriters for far too long. He’s survived numerous changes in band personnel common to any act that puts in over 200 nights a year on the road for a minimal wage, as well a major label contract debacle. However, he’s an astounding, visceral live performer and as his latest studio release, Draw The Curtains (Rykodisc) proves, a captivating songwriter."

Alternative Addiction writes, "In his latest effort Draw the Curtains, his blues/soul influences are at the forefront (Cocker, Redding), but there’s an element of southern-pop, almost country on this disc that’s best compared to Bob Seger and that really stands out."

Gibson's Nicole Keiper's review begins, "Will Hoge evokes opposite things, calling an album something like Draw the Curtains. He could mean the end of an act, signaling the house lights to rise and the brooms to start their work, or maybe just the opposite—pulling the curtains open to let the sunshine in for a new day’s dawn."

Lesley Jones of American Songwriter rates the album a 4 out of 5 stars and writes, "Well-known tourman Will Hoge unloads the powerful combination of reality and soul on his newest studio album, Draw the Curtains."

== Track listing ==
All tracks are written by Will Hoge.

No.	Title	Length
1.	"When I Can Afford to Lose"	3:44
2.	"These Were the Days"	3:24
3.	"Dirty Little War"	4:37
4.	"Silver or Gold"	4:27
5.	"Sex, Lies and Money"	3:14
6.	"I'm Sorry Now"	3:39
7.	"Midnight Paradise"	3:38
8.	"Draw the Curtains"	5:09
9.	"Washed by the Water"	5:08
10.	"The Highway's Home"	4:18
Total length:		41:18

Track information and credits adapted from Discogs and AllMusic. Track information and credits also verified from the album's liner notes.

== Musicians ==
- Will Hoge – Acoustic Guitar, Electric Guitar, Handclapping, Harmonica, Percussion, Stomping, Vocals
- Dan Baird – Electric Guitar
- Sigurdur Birkis – Drums
- Pat Buchanan – 12 String Electric Guitar, Electric Guitar
- Chris Carmichael – Fiddle, Strings
- Ken Coomer – Drums, Percussion
- Jefferson Crow – Fender Rhodes, Piano
- Pete Finney – Pedal Steel
- Adam Fluhrer – Electric Guitar
- Steve Hinson – Lap Steel Guitar
- Scotty Huff – Horn
- Rami Jaffee – Hammond Organ
- Tim Marks – Bass, Bass Instrument
- Jerry Dale McFadden – Accordion, Hammond B3, Hammond Organ
- Angela Primm – Handclapping, Stomping, Background Vocals
- Garrison Starr – Background Vocals
- Dean Tomasek – Bass, Bass Instrument
- Gale West – Handclapping, Background Vocals
- Reese Wynans – Hammond Organ

== Production ==
- Charlie Brocco – Audio Engineer, Audio Production, Engineer, Mixing, Producer
- Ken Coomer – Producer, Audio Production, Mixing
- Eric Conn – Mastering
- Bryan Vastano – Assistant
- Leslie Tolman – Assistant
- Nicole Giacco – Assistant
- Mara Wish Buttleman – Assistant
- Patrick Miller – Audio Engineer, Assistant Engineer
- Ruby Marshand – A&R
- Jamie Hoyt Vitale – Art Direction, Design
- Andrew Southam – Photography
