= Life at Best =

Studio album by Eli Young Band
- Released: August 16, 2011
- Studio: Dark Horse Recording (Franklin, TN); Wrucke's House (Nashville, TN)
- Genre: Country
- Length: 50:19
- Label: Republic Nashville
- Producer: Frank Liddell; Mike Wrucke

Eli Young Band chronology
Jet Black & Jealous (2008)	Life at Best (2011)	10,000 Towns (2014)

Singles from Life at Best
- 1. "Crazy Girl" Released: March 7, 2011; 2. "Even If It Breaks Your Heart" Released: January 23, 2012; 3. "Say Goodnight" Released: August 27, 2012

Professional ratings
Review scores
Source	Rating
Allmusic	2.5/5 stars
Country Weekly	4/5 stars

Life at Best is the third studio album by American country music group Eli Young Band. It was released on August 16, 2011 via Republic Nashville. The album includes the number one singles "Crazy Girl" and "Even If It Breaks Your Heart" as well as "Say Goodnight", which peaked at number 22 on the Country Airplay Chart. According to HITS Daily Double, the album sold 348,000 copies as of February 2014. A "15 Years Deluxe" reissue was released on May 15, 2026.

== Reception ==
=== Critical ===
Giving it four stars out of five, Steve Morley of Country Weekly said that the album "rings with roots-rock guitars and meaty, often melancholy themes". A less favorable review came from Andrew Leahey of AllMusic, who thought that it was a "step backwards" because he did not consider its songs as memorable as those on Jet Black & Jealous.

== Track listing ==
No.	Title	Writer(s)	Length
1.	"Even If It Breaks Your Heart"	Will Hoge; Eric Paslay	3:40
2.	"Crazy Girl"	Lee Brice; Liz Rose	3:20
3.	"Every Other Memory"	Chris DeStefano; Catt Gravitt; Josh Kear	4:44
4.	"On My Way"	Scooter Carusoe; Jon Jones; James Young	3:26
5.	"Skeletons"	Mike Eli; Sean McConnell; Young	3:21
6.	"I Love You"	Brice; Kyle Jacobs; Jones; Chris Thompson	3:20
7.	"The Fight"	Natalie Hemby; Tim Putnam	4:25
8.	"My Old Man's Son"	Lance W. Adkins; Eli; Blu Sanders	3:42
9.	"Recover"	Eli; Young; Jacobs	2:58
10.	"The Falling"	Eli; Ryan James	3:38
11.	"War on a Desperate Man"	Eli; Sanders	4:06
12.	"Say Goodnight"	Katrina Elam; Melissa Peirce; John Paul White	3:08
13.	"How Quickly You Forget"	Eli; Hemby; Daniel Tashian	3:40
14.	"Life at Best"	Eli; Young	2:51
Total length:			50:19

15-year anniversary deluxe edition bonus tracks
No.	Title	Writer(s)	Length
15.	"Go Outside and Dance" (Unreleased Track)	Adam Hood; Brent Cobb	2:32
16.	"Room Goes Dark" (Demo)	Eli; Mando Saenz; Young	3:13
17.	"Me and Jack" (Demo)	Eli; Bryan Tyler; Young	3:23
18.	"Crazy Girl" (Acoustic)	Rose; Paslay	3:08
19.	"Say Goodnight" (Radio Edit)	Elam; Peirce; White	2:57
20.	"The Fight" (Single Edit)	Hemby; Putnam	3:54

== Personnel ==
Adapted from the Life at Best liner notes.

Eli Young Band

- Mike Eli – guitar, lead vocals
- Jon Jones – bass guitar, background vocals
- Chris Thompson – drums, percussion
- James Young – lead guitar, harmonica, background vocals

Production

- Eric Tonkin – assistant engineer
- Nick Kallstrom – assistant engineer
- Mark Dobson – digital editing
- Mike Wrucke – mixing
- Richard Dodd – mastering

Additional musicians

- Eric Darken – percussion
- Fred Eltringham – percussion
- Kree Harrison – background vocals
- Natalie Hemby – background vocals
- Greg Leisz – steel guitar
- Tony Obrohta – guitar
- Russ Pahl – steel guitar
- Oran Thornton – guitar
- Michael Webb – Hammond B-3 organ, keyboards
- Mike Wrucke – guitar, steel guitar, harmonica, mandolin, background vocals

== Chart performance ==
=== Weekly charts ===
Chart (2011–12)	Peak position
Australian Albums (ARIA)	75
US Billboard 200	6
US Top Country Albums (Billboard)	3

=== Year-end charts ===
Chart (2011)	Position
US Top Country Albums (Billboard)	55
Chart (2012)	Position
US Top Country Albums (Billboard)	33

=== Singles ===
Year	Single	Peak chart positions				Certifications (sales threshold)
Year	Single	US Country	US Country Airplay	US	CAN	Certifications (sales threshold)
2011	"Crazy Girl"	1	—	30	66	CAN: Gold; US: 5× Platinum
2012	"Even If It Breaks Your Heart"	1	—	29	56	US: 3× Platinum
2012	"Say Goodnight"	31	22	110	—	
"—" denotes releases that did not chart

== Certifications ==
Region	Certification	Certified units/sales
United States (RIAA)	Platinum	1,000,000^{‡}
^{‡} Sales+streaming figures based on certification alone.
