= Jet Black & Jealous =

Studio album by Eli Young Band
- Released: September 16, 2008
- Genre: Country
- Length: 45:54
- Label: Universal South
- Producers: Erik Herbst; Mike Wrucke

Eli Young Band chronology
Live at the Jolly Fox (2006)	Jet Black & Jealous (2008)	Life at Best (2011)

Singles from Jet Black & Jealous
- 1. "When It Rains" Released: October 22, 2007; 2. "Always the Love Songs" Released: September 29, 2008; 3. "Radio Waves" Released: June 29, 2009; 4. "Guinevere" Released: March 22, 2010

Jet Black & Jealous is the second studio album by American country music group Eli Young Band. It was released on September 16, 2008 by Universal South. The album's first single, "When It Rains", peaked at #34 on the Billboard Hot Country Songs chart. A second single, "Always the Love Songs", was released to country radio in September 2008, and debuted at #60 on the Billboard Hot Country Songs chart, ultimately peaking at #11. Originally written by New Orleans-born songwriter Paul Sanchez, the song "Jet Black & Jealous" was re-written for the Eli Young Band by Scooter Carusoe.

== Content ==
"When It Rains" was the album's first single, spending more than thirty weeks on the charts and peaking at #34 on the U.S. Billboard Hot Country Songs chart. After it came "Always the Love Songs," which became the band's first Top 20 hit with a peak of #11. The album's third and fourth singles, "Radio Waves" and "Guinevere," peaked at #35 and #45, respectively.

== Critical reception ==
Andrew Leahey of Allmusic gave the album three-and-a-half stars out of five, saying that the "songs borrow from rock and pop without ever fully entering either camp."

Juli Thanki of Engine 145 gave "Radio Waves" a "thumbs up," describing it as "one of the worst" songs on the album, but saying that it recalled the sound of the Gin Blossoms and was "far from unlistenable."

== Track listing ==
No.	Title	Writer(s)	Length
1.	"Always the Love Songs"	George Ducas, David Lee Murphy	3:42
2.	"When It Rains"	James Young	4:15
3.	"Radio Waves"	Mike Eli, Blu Sanders	3:57
4.	"Enough Is Enough"	Eli, Young	3:12
5.	"Famous"	Keith Gattis	3:35
6.	"Throw and Go"	Eli, Young	3:21
7.	"Guinevere"	Scooter Carusoe, Eli, Young	4:47
8.	"Get in the Car and Drive"	Sanders	3:41
9.	"Jet Black & Jealous"	Carusoe, Paul Sanchez	3:42
10.	"Mystery in the Making"	Eli, Natalie Hemby, Young	4:44
11.	"How Should I Know"	Eli, Young	3:15
12.	"Home"	Kelly Archer, Eli, Justin Weaver	3:43

== Personnel ==
=== Eli Young Band ===
- Mike Eli- acoustic guitar, lead vocals
- Jon Jones- bass guitar, background vocals
- Chris Thompson- drums
- James Young- electric guitar, harmonica, mandolin, background vocals

=== Additional Musicians ===
- Vince Barnhart- background vocals
- Rick Brantley- harmonica
- Chris Carmichael- strings
- Fred Eltringham- percussion
- Erik Herbst- baritone guitar
- Russ Pahl- pedal steel guitar
- Blu Sanders- acoustic guitar, background vocals
- Michael Webb- Hammond organ
- Mike Wrucke- banjo, acoustic guitar, electric guitar, pedal steel guitar, background vocals
- Tommy Young- Hammond organ

== Charts ==
=== Weekly charts ===
Chart (2008)	Peak position
US Billboard 200	30
US Top Country Albums (Billboard)	5

=== Year-end charts ===
Chart (2009)	Position
US Top Country Albums (Billboard)	64
