= Fingerprints (Eli Young Band album) =

Studio album by Eli Young Band
- Released: June 16, 2017
- Genre: Country
- Label: Valory Music
- Producer: Ross Copperman; Eli Young Band; Jeremy Stover

Eli Young Band chronology
Turn It On (2015)	Fingerprints (2017)	This Is Eli Young Band: Greatest Hits (2019)

Fingerprints is the sixth studio album by American country music ensemble Eli Young Band. The work was released on 16 June 2017. The album includes the single "Saltwater Gospel".

== Critical reception ==
Rating it 3 out of 5 stars, Stephen Thomas Erlewine of Allmusic wrote that "By stripping away some of the gloss, it's easier to hear how the Eli Young Band have both melodic muscle and musical variety."

== Track listing ==
1. "Saltwater Gospel" (Ross Copperman, Nicolle Galyon, Ashley Gorley) - 3:08
2. "Fingerprints" (Copperman, Josh Osborne, Mike Eli, James Young) - 3:02
3. "Never Again" (Ryan Hurd, Jimmy Robbins, Laura Veltz) - 2:58
4. "Old Songs" (Andrew DeRoberts, Eli, Adam Hambrick, Jason Nix) - 3:40
5. "Drive" (Copperman, Eli, Gorley, Tom Douglas) - 3:33
6. "Skin & Bones" (Phil Barton, Eli, Lori McKenna) - 4:01
7. "A Heart Needs a Break" (Copperman, Osborne, Shane McAnally) - 2:39
8. "Once" (Eli, Young, Osborne, Veltz) - 2:47
9. "Never Land" (Copperman, Jon Nite, Eli, Young) - 3:24
10. "God Love the Rain" (Erik Dylan, Eli, Jason Nix) - 3:37
11. "The Days I Feel Alone" (Andrew DeRoberts, Eli, Nix, Hambrick) - 3:06

== Personnel ==
Credits adapted from AllMusic.

=== Eli Young Band ===
- Mike Eli - lead vocals, background vocals
- Jon Jones - bass guitar, background vocals
- Chris Thompson - drums, percussion, background vocals
- James Young - acoustic guitar, electric guitar, harmonica, background vocals

=== Additional Musicians ===
- Ross Copperman - acoustic guitar, electric guitar, keyboards, mandolin, percussion, programming, background vocals
- Dan Dugmore - steel guitar
- Carolyn Dawn Johnson - background vocals
- Cale Richardson - acoustic guitar, banjo, mandolin
- Mike Rojas - accordion
- Laura Veltz - background vocals
- Derek Wells - acoustic guitar, electric guitar

== Chart positions ==
=== Album ===
Chart (2017)	Peak position
US Billboard 200	116
US Top Country Albums (Billboard)	17

=== Singles ===
Year	Single	Peak chart positions	
Year	Single	US Country	US Country Airplay
2016	"Saltwater Gospel"	43	41
"—" denotes releases that did not chart
