= Cumberland Records =

American independent record label

Cumberland Records is an independently owned label in Nashville, TN. It was started in 1988 by 3 musicians, Mark Howard, Alisa Jones, and Ron Wall. It specializes in Old Time Acoustic Instrumental Music, and was one of the first labels to offer music in what is now known as the "gift market". Cumberland produced over 50 CDs ranging from old time classics like "Church In The Wildwood" to Big Band CD's and Irish selections. Cumberland had a long-running display in Cracker Barrel Old Country Store, and produced an exclusive series of another 60 or so classic artist compilations called American Music Legends. as well as Instrumental packages like Bluegrass Highway, Front Porch Gathering and countless more. Cumberland Records is still available in limited US markets. The "Cumberland" label was originally started around 1963. The label produced original "country music" from old-time fiddle, bluegrass, and banjo to more modern electric guitar and steel guitar albums. These original "Cumberland Record" albums were all produced by Kelso Herston, a Nashville producer at the time. All the 12 albums were released for retail sales. These original Cumberland albums were released in both mono and stereo versions.

== See also ==
- List of record labels
