= Eli Young Band =

American country music band

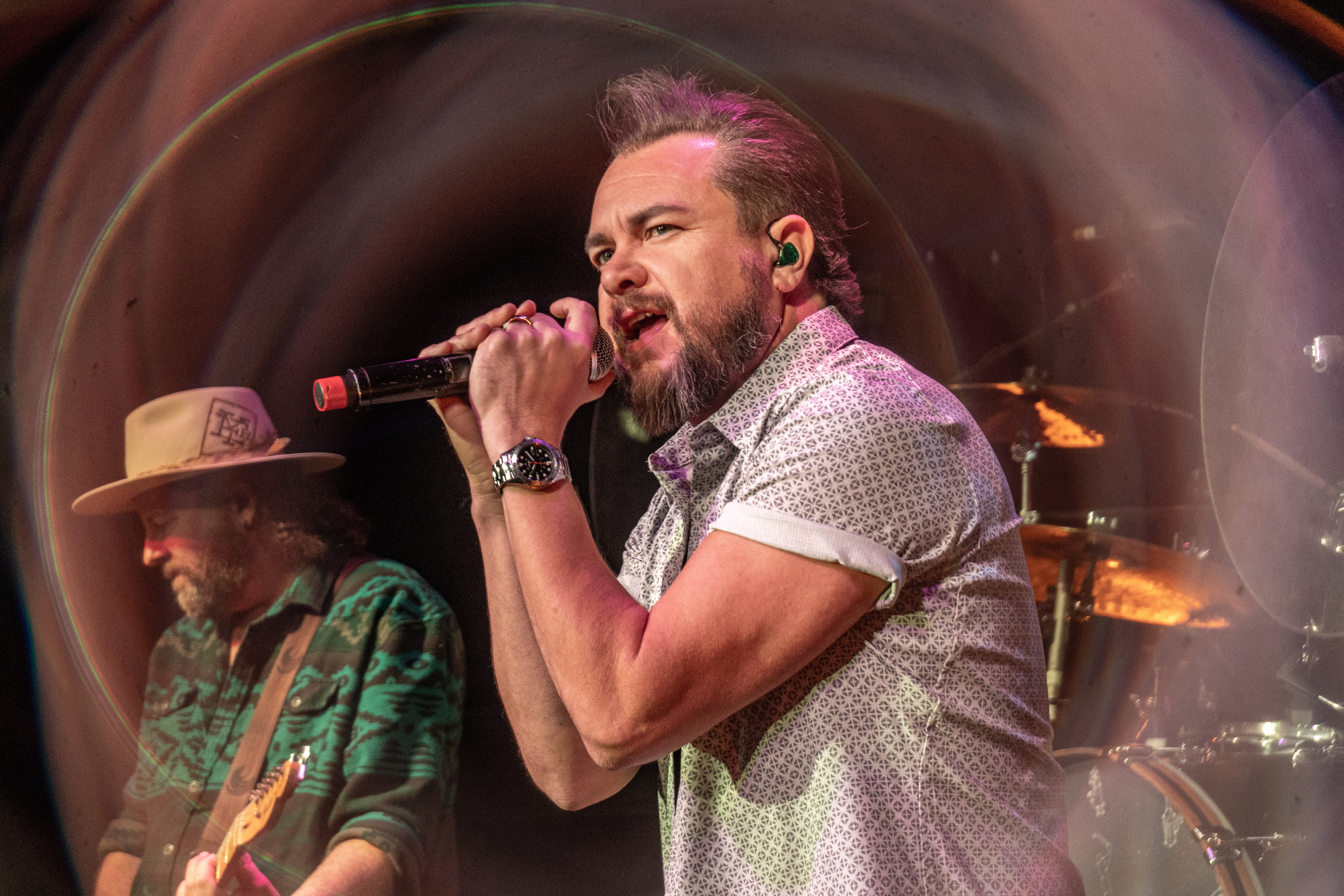
- Eli Young Band performing at The Regency Live in Springfield Missouri - 12-11-25

Background information
- Origin: Tomball, Texas, U.S.
- Genres: Country
- Years active: 2000–present
- Labels: Carnival; Universal South; Republic Nashville; Valory
- Members: Mike Eli; James Young; Jon Jones; Chris Thompson
- Website: www.eliyoungband.com

Eli Young Band is an American country music band from Tomball, Texas. The band consists of Mike Eli (lead vocals, guitar), James Young (guitar), Jon Jones (bass guitar), and Chris Thompson (drums). They released their self-titled debut album in 2002, followed by the Carnival Records release Level in 2005. Their third album, Jet Black & Jealous, was released in 2008 by Universal South Records. A second major-label album, Life at Best, was released in 2011 by Republic Nashville, with 10,000 Towns following in early 2014. The band has charted eight times on the Billboard country charts, with four of their singles having reached No. 1: "Crazy Girl", which was the top country song of 2011 according to Billboard Year-End, along with "Even If It Breaks Your Heart", "Drunk Last Night", and "Love Ain't".

== Biography ==
Mike Eli and James Young met at the University of North Texas where they became dorm roommates their freshman year. They played guitar and eventually began writing and singing songs together; they formed the acoustic duo, Eli & Young, while attending the University of North Texas and played locally at Rockin Rodeo. Chris Thompson and Jon Jones joined them later on and they became the Eli Young Band.

They released Level on Carnival Records on April 5, 2005, and opened shows for Miranda Lambert. Level is their last Texas country album before becoming a Nashville act. Many of these songs can still be heard in their live shows today, such as "Small Town Kid" and "Everything Is You".

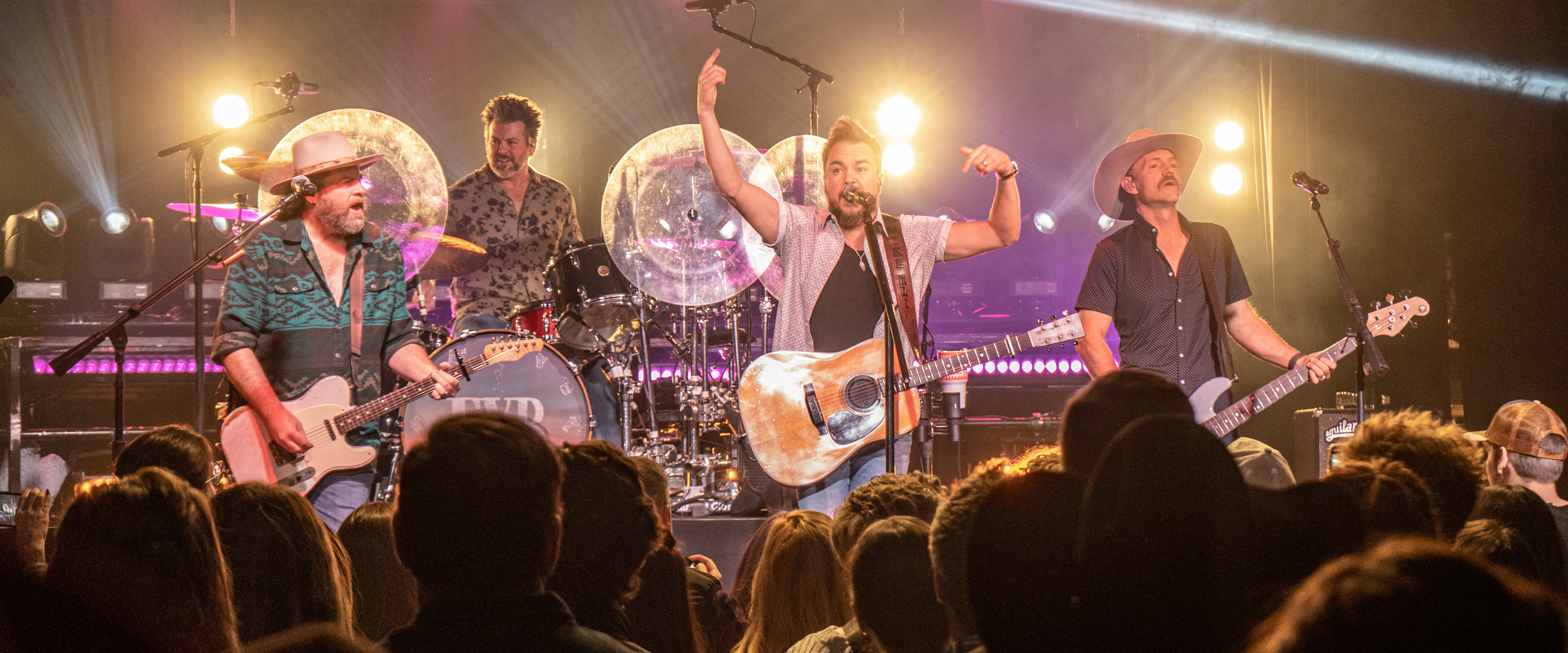
Eli Young Band performing at The Regency Live in Springfield Missouri - 12-11-25

=== Jet Black & Jealous ===
While touring, they were also making songwriting a top priority and made time for writing trips and retreats at the Young family ranch. Energized with new songs, they were ready to begin working on a new album in late 2007. Working with producers Frank Liddell and Mike Wrucke (who have also produced for Lambert), they took time off from touring to record at Omni Studios in Nashville. Their third album, Jet Black & Jealous, was released in 2008. Its lead-off single, "When It Rains", spent 37 weeks on the country charts and peaked at No. 34. A second chart single, "Always the Love Songs" (co-written by David Lee Murphy and George Ducas), peaked at number 11 on Billboard. After it came "Radio Waves" and "Guinevere".

=== Life at Best ===
In 2011, the Eli Young Band moved to Republic Nashville and released their fifth overall single, "Crazy Girl" as the lead single off Life at Best. It became the band's first platinum-selling digital single, as well as their first No. 1 single, and also was the number 1 song on that year's Billboard Year-End charts.

The band received three nominations for the 2012 Academy of Country Music Awards: Song of the Year, Top Vocal Group of the Year, and Single Record of the Year. On April 1, 2012, the band won the Academy of Country Music Award for Song of the Year.

In January 2012, the band released its second single from the album, "Even If It Breaks Your Heart", which was originally recorded by co-writer Will Hoge. Their version of the song reached the No. 1 spot as well. "Even It If Breaks Your Heart" is certified platinum by the RIAA. In the 55th Annual GRAMMY Awards, the band was nominated for Best Duo/Group Performance for "Even If It Breaks Your Heart" and "Even If It Breaks Your Heart" was nominated for Best Country Song. The band is nominated in the 48th ACM Awards for Vocal Group of the Year and "Even If It Breaks Your Heart" is nominated for Single Record of the Year and Song of the Year. "Say Goodnight" was the third and final single, peaking at number 22.

=== 10,000 Towns ===
"Drunk Last Night", the first single from Eli Young Band's fifth studio album, 10,000 Towns, was released to country radio on July 1, 2013. On August 16, 2013, the band announced they would be headlining a "Drunk Last Night" Fall/Winter Tour. On September 10, 2013, they were nominated for Vocal Group of the Year in the CMA Awards. "Drunk Last Night" hit number 1 on the Country Airplay chart in December 2013. On January 7, 2014, Eli Young Band announced the release date, the album cover, and the track listing for 10,000 Towns, which was released on March 4, 2014. The album debuted #1 on Billboard's Top Country Albums Chart. The album's second single, "Dust", was released to country radio on February 3, 2014. On April 2, 2014, Eli Young Band performed "Dust" on CONAN. The band was also nominated for Vocal Group of the Year in the 2014 Academy of Country Music Awards.

Also in late 2013-early 2014, Mike Eli sang guest vocals on The Cadillac Three's debut single "The South", along with Dierks Bentley and Florida Georgia Line.

=== Turn It On EP ===
"Turn It On", the first single from Eli Young Band's Turn It On EP, was released to country radio on March 9, 2015. "Turn It On" was the most added song at radio on that date. The Turn It On EP was released on March 10, 2015, via Apple Music and other digital outlets. The official music video for "Turn It On" premiered on VEVO on Monday, May 4.

=== Honey, I'm Good ===
"Honey, I'm Good", a duet with pop artist Andy Grammer, was released to country radio on Tuesday, July 14, 2015, as well as being made available via Apple Music and other digital outlets.

=== Winter Tour 2015/2016 ===
Eli Young Band announced their Winter Tour 2015/2016 on Monday, September 21, 2015, which includes concerts in Philadelphia, Orlando, Las Vegas, and Washington D.C. Tickets and VIP packages for the 14 tour dates went on sale on Friday, September 25, 2015.

=== Fingerprints ===
The album's first single, "Saltwater Gospel" released to country radio in mid-2016. A full album, Fingerprints, followed on June 16, 2017.

=== This Is Eli Young Band: Greatest Hits ===
After a nearly three-year chart hiatus, the band announced a greatest hits package, This Is Eli Young Band: Greatest Hits in 2019. The album's lead single is "Love Ain't".

=== Strange Hours ===
The four-piece released Strange Hours, its seventh studio album, on Aug. 1 and the project marks the group’s return to independent music for the first time since their 2005 debut, Level.

== Discography ==
- Level (2005)
- Jet Black & Jealous (2008)
- Life at Best (2011)
- 10,000 Towns (2014)
- Fingerprints (2017)
- Love Talking (2022)
- Strange Hours (2025)
