= Anchors (Will Hoge album) =

Studio album by Will Hoge
- Released: August 11, 2017
- Genre: Country; Americana
- Length: 38:45
- Label: Thirty Tigers
- Producer: Will Hoge

Will Hoge chronology
Small Town Dreams (2015)	Anchors (2017)	My American Dream (2018)

Professional ratings
Review scores
Source	Rating
AllMusic	4/5 stars

Anchors is the tenth studio album by musician Will Hoge released on August 11, 2017.

== Background ==
After touring for his previous album, Small Town Dreams, Hoge disbanded his group and started to write songs at home and toured solo. After a period of depression, Hoge saw his children get together in the family garage and perform songs. Hoge said, "I watched from the bedroom window and it was like a portal back to the time when you’re not thinking about touring companies or LLCs or insurance for employees...I was 16 or 17 when I got my first guitar and wanted to write songs and wanted to do this professionally. Seeing them really over the next couple of days helped me re-center what I wanted to do and I wrote that song, "17".'"

== Reception ==
The album has been met with positive reception. Writing for AllMusic, Thom Jurek called the album "honest" and Hoge a "master storyteller".

== Track listing ==
All tracks are written by Will Hoge, except where noted.

No.	Title	Length
1.	"The Reckoning"	3:43
2.	"This Grand Charade"	3:43
3.	"Little Bit of Rust (feat. Sheryl Crow)" (Hoge, James LeBlanc)	3:47
4.	"Cold Night in Santa Fe"	3:22
5.	"Baby's Eyes" (Brendan Benson, Hoge)	2:29
6.	"(This Ain't) An Original Sin"	3:19
7.	"Through Missing You" (Benson, Hoge, Jon Randall)	3:16
8.	"Anchors"	3:55
9.	"Angels Wings" (Hoge, Adam Hood)	4:00
10.	"17"	4:04
11.	"Young as We Will Ever Be" (Dylan Altman, Hoge)	3:07
Total length:		38:45

== Personnel ==
Adapted from LP liner notes

- Will Hoge – writer, producer
- Ray Kennedy – mixing, additional engineer
- David Axelrod – engineer
- Zaq Reynolds – assistant engineer
- Andrew Mendelson – mastering engineer
