= Say Goodnight =

Single by Eli Young Band

from the album Life at Best
- Released: August 27, 2012
- Genre: Country
- Length: 3:08
- Label: Republic Nashville
- Songwriters: Katrina Elam; Melissa Peirce; John Paul White
- Producers: Frank Liddell; Mike Wrucke

Eli Young Band singles chronology
"Even If It Breaks Your Heart" (2012)	"Say Goodnight" (2012)	"Drunk Last Night" (2013)

"Say Goodnight" is a song recorded by American country music group the Eli Young Band. It was released in August 2012 as the third single from their album Life at Best. The song was written by Katrina Elam, Melissa Peirce and John Paul White.

== Critical reception ==
Billy Dukes of Taste of Country gave the song four stars out of five, writing that "sparse instrumentation early gives the story room to be told and enjoyed." Matt Bjorke of Roughstock gave the song a favorable review, saying that "not only does it showcase their strong musical growth but it showcases a band unafraid to record songs that may be out of their typical comfort zone."

== Music video ==
The music video was directed by Brian Lazzaro and premiered in November 2012. The robot previously appeared in the 2012 film Argo.

== Chart performance ==
"Say Goodnight" debuted at number 49 on the U.S. Billboard Hot Country Songs chart for the week of September 1, 2012. It also debuted at number 10 on the U.S. Billboard Bubbling Under Hot 100 Singles chart for the week of February 9, 2013.

Chart (2012–2013)	Peak position
Canada Country (Billboard)	44
US Bubbling Under Hot 100 (Billboard)	10
US Country Airplay (Billboard)	22
US Hot Country Songs (Billboard)	31
