= Number Seven (Will Hoge album) =

Studio album by Will Hoge
- Released: September 27, 2011
- Studio: Will's House; Creative Workshop (Berry Hill, Tennessee); Quadrafonic Sound (Nashville, Tennessee)
- Genre: Country
- Length: 37:11
- Label: Rykodisc
- Producer: Will Hoge

Will Hoge chronology
The Wreckage (2009)	Number Seven (2011)	Never Give In (2013)

Number Seven is the seventh studio album by Will Hoge, released September 27, 2011 by Rykodisc.

== Critical reception ==
Professional ratings
Review scores
Source	Rating
AllMusic	3.5/5 stars
PopMatters	7/10 stars

Andrew Leahey of AllMusic says, "If it ain't broke, Will Hoge ain't gonna fix it. Number Seven takes most of its cues from the six albums before it, pairing grizzled country-rockers with the occasional world-weary ballad."

Glide Magazine writes, "Acting as his own producer for the first time, Hoge says this album feels truer to his personal vision than any he’s made."

Bill Clifford of PopMatters writes, "Often, you’ll hear young singer/songwriters with a poetic lyrical bent being tagged with "…the next Dylan" comparison. Less often however, is a young rock artist labeled as "… the next Springsteen." Franklin, Tennessee based roots rocker Will Hoge happens to fall as the latter."

Matt Bjorke of Roughstock says in his review that, "Number Seven is clearly evoking classic country/rockers like Neil Young, Tom Petty and The Band but it never, ever feels like Will Hoge is copying or trying to be them. Instead, he’s used their templates to craft another steady, and downright fantastic collection of songs that is as good as anything you’ll hear coming out of Nashville, Los Angeles or New York this year."

== Track listing ==
All tracks are written by Will Hoge, unless otherwise noted

No.	Title	Writer(s)	Length
1.	"Fool's Gonna Fly"	Will Hoge; Dylan Altman; Eric Paslay	3:15
2.	"Too Old to Die Young"	Will Hoge; Dylan Altman	2:56
3.	"Goddam California"		3:17
4.	"American Dream"		4:17
5.	"Gone"	Will Hoge; Dylan Altman; Eric Paslay	3:01
6.	"The Illegal Line"		3:55
7.	"Silver Chain"		3:07
8.	"Nothing to Lose"	Will Hoge; Paul Moak	2:33
9.	"No Man's Land"	Will Hoge; Jedd Hughes	3:07
10.	"Trying to Be a Man"		3:59
11.	"When I Get My Wings"		3:44
Total length:			37:11

== Musicians ==
1 – "Fool's Gonna Fly"

- Will Hoge – Lead Vocals, Background Vocals, Acoustic Guitar, Harmonica
- Adam Beard – Bass, Background Vocals
- Adam Ollendorff – Lead Guitar
- Devin Malone – Electric Guitar, 12 String Guitar
- Pat Buchanan – Electric Guitar
- Ken Coomer – Drums
- Sigurdur Birkis – Percussion

2 – "Too Old to Die Young"

- Will Hoge – Lead Vocals, Background Vocals, Vibraphone
- Adam Beard – Bass
- Adam Ollendorff – Lap Steel
- Devin Malone – Acoustic Guitar, Electric Guitar, 12 String Guitar
- Jonathan Hamby – Piano
- Ken Coomer – Drums
- Sigurdur Birkis – Percussion

3 – "Goddam California"

- Will Hoge – Lead Vocals, Background Vocals, Acoustic Guitar
- Adam Beard – Bass, Background Vocals
- Adam Ollendorff – Pedal Steel
- Devin Malone – Electric Guitar
- Pat Buchanan – Electric Guitar
- Ian Fitchuck – Piano
- Sigurdur Birkis – Drums, Percussion
- Sarah Buxton – Background Vocals

4 – "American Dream"

- Will Hoge – Lead Vocals, Acoustic Guitar
- Adam Beard – Bass
- Carl Broemel – Lead Guitar
- Bucky Baxter – Pedal Steel
- John Lancaster – Piano
- Sigurdur Birkis – Drums, Percussion

5 – "Gone"

- Will Hoge – Lead Vocals, Background Vocals
- Adam Beard – Bass, Background Vocals
- Adam Ollendorff – Electric Guitar
- Devin Malone – Electric Guitar
- Kenny Greenberg – Lead Guitar
- Ian Fitchuck – Piano
- Ken Coomer – Drums
- Sigurdur Birkis – Percussion, Timpani

6 – "The Illegal Line"

- Will Hoge – Lead Vocals, Acoustic Guitar, Electric Guitar, Hammond B3, High Piano
- Adam Beard – Bass, Low Piano
- Tom Bukovac – Lead Guitar
- Sigurdur Birkis – Drums, Percussion

7 – "Silver Chain"

- Will Hoge – Lead Vocals, Background Vocals, Acoustic Guitar, Electric Guitar
- Adam Beard – Bass
- Kenny Vaughan – Lead Guitar
- Sigurdur Birkis – Drums, Percussion

8 – "Nothing to Lose"

- Will Hoge – Lead Vocals, Background Vocals, Acoustic Guitar, Vibraphone, Handclaps
- Adam Beard – Bass, Handclaps
- Devin Malone – Electric Guitar
- Pat Buchanan – Lead Guitar
- Jonathan Hamby – Piano
- Ken Coomer – Drums
- Sigurdur Birkis – Percussion
- Adam Ollendorff – Handclaps

9 – "No Man's Land"

- Will Hoge – lead vocals, acoustic guitar, handclaps
- Adam Beard – bass, handclaps
- Adam Ollendorff – lead guitar, handclaps
- Keith Gattis – electric guitar
- Bucky Baxter – pedal steel
- Ben Sesar – drums
- Sigurdur Birkis – percussion, handclaps
- Gang vocals – Will Hoge, Sigurdur Birkis, Adam Beard, Adam Ollendorff, Brady Beard, Andrew Petroff, Devin Malone, David Wakefield, Charlie Brocco, Kristin Jacobsen, Brittany Wesemann, Kaydee Joyce, Danni Bocker, Jenny Talia

10 – "Trying to Be a Man"

- Will Hoge – lead vocals, acoustic guitar
- Adam Beard – bass
- Vince Gill – acoustic guitar
- John Lancaster – piano, Hammond B3
- Sigurdur Birkis – drums, percussion

11 – "When I Get My Wings"

- Will Hoge – lead vocals
- Adam Beard – bass
- Adam Ollendorff – electric guitar
- Kenny Greenberg – lead guitar
- Jonathan Hamby – piano
- Jim Horn – saxophone, baritone saxophone
- Scott Ducaj – trumpet
- Sigurdur Birkis – drums, percussion

== Production ==
- Produced by Will Hoge
- Engineered and mixed by Charlie Brocco
- Additional Engineering by Adam Beard, Matt Rausch, Sigurdur Birkis
- Assistant Engineers: Brett Lind, Patrick Miller, Michael Esser
- Mastered by Andrew Mendelson

== Charts ==
Chart (2011)	Peak position
Top Heatseekers Albums (Billboard)	12
