= The Wreckage (album) =

Studio album by Will Hoge
- Released: September 29, 2009
- Studios: Sound Emporium (Nashville, Tennessee)
- Genre: Country
- Length: 40:13
- Label: Rykodisc

Will Hoge chronology
Draw the Curtains (2007)	The Wreckage (2009)	Number Seven (2011)

The Wreckage is the sixth studio album by American singer-songwriter Will Hoge, released on September 29, 2009, by Rykodisc.

== Critical reception ==
Professional ratings
Review scores
Source	Rating
AllMusic	3.5/5 stars
American Songwriter	3.5/5 stars
PopMatters	6/10 stars

Andrew Leahey of AllMusic says, "He's rarely sounded as convincing as he does here, having suffered enough misery during the previous 12 months to make his blues-influenced songwriting all the more persuasive."

Lizza Connor Bowen of American Songwriter writes, "Will Hoge’s aptly titled The Wreckage was born after the Nashville rock and roller was sidelined by an auto accident in 2008. With free time to recover and ruminate, Hoge bows a melodic collection with lyrics that lean more toward introspection than his previous work."

Steve Leftridge of PopMatters gives the album 6 out of a possible 10 stars and says, "The record starts with a couple of terrific rockers, the thumping ‘Hard to Love’, about the disconnect between needing someone and the urge to bail out ‘in this damn world of lies’, and he backs up such a sentiment with a procession of emotionally raw songs. ‘Long Gone’ is a Tom Petty-style burner that follows the record’s chief theme, that love is a twisted blessing because it lies just outside our reach."

Sid Smith of the BBC writes, "Given the dire circumstances from which it was born, The Wreckage is understandably a triumphant record. But it comes complete with enough self-reflection to avoid coming across as yet another bright and breezy album about cars and girls."

Paste's review of the album says, "Hoge, the Nashville native, creates climates that are frustrated sets of spaces and people, just trying to bang their heads through their walls so that they can finally get over to the other side, where there's still no guarantee that things are going to be improved, but they'll be different and potentially better than they are now. He sings about false hope and about being sold tonics that just don't work. There are no active ingredients to be found in them and they wind up to be empty calories – nothing to chew on or digest."

== Track listing ==
No.	Title	Writer(s)	Length
1.	"Hard to Love"	Will Hoge	3:23
2.	"Long Gone"	Will Hoge; Jim Lauderdale	2:51
3.	"The Wreckage"	Will Hoge; Paul Moak	3:33
4.	"Favorite Waste of Time"	Will Hoge; Greg Crowe	3:11
5.	"Even If It Breaks Your Heart"	Will Hoge; Eric Paslay	3:43
6.	"What Could I Do"	Will Hoge; Trey Bruce	4:28
7.	"Goodnight/Goodbye"	Will Hoge; Michael Logen	4:24
8.	"Just Like Me"	Will Hoge; Blair Daly	3:28
9.	"Highway Wings"	Will Hoge; Eric Paslay	3:24
10.	"Where Do We Go from Down"	Will Hoge; Kyle Cook	3:45
11.	"Too Late Too Soon"	Will Hoge	4:03
Total length:			40:13

== Musicians ==
- Will Hoge – Celeste, Composer, Acoustic Guitar, Electric Guitar, Percussion, Lead Vocals, Background Vocals, Harmonica
- Adam Beard – Bass, Horn, Background Vocals
- Sigurdur Birkis – Drums, Percussion
- Pat Buchanan – Acoustic Guitar, Baritone Guitar, Electric Guitar
- Kyle Cook – Electric Guitar, Background Vocals
- Ken Coomer – Drums, Percussion
- Jen Gunderman – Hammond B3, Mellotron
- Tony Harrell – Piano
- Scotty Huff – Background Vocals
- Devin Malone – Cello, 12 String Guitar, Acoustic Guitar, Electric Guitar, Hammond B3, Pedal Steel, Piano, Wurlitzer Piano
- Tim Marks – Bass
- Ashley Monroe – Vocals
- Kenny Vaughan – Electric Guitar
- Michael Webb – Hammond B3, Piano

== Production ==
- Ken Coomer – Producer, Engineer
- Charlie Brocco – Producer, Engineer
- Patrick Miller – Engineer
- Jim Scott – Mixing
- Andrew Southam – Photography
- Greg Calbi – Mastering
- Jon Sheperd – Production Manager
- Doug Buttleman – Management
- Jamie Hoyt-Vitale – Art Direction, Design
- Ruby Marchand – A&R

== Charts ==
Chart (2009)	Peak position
Top Heatseekers Albums (Billboard)	16
