= Turn It On (EP) =

EP by Eli Young Band
- Released: March 10, 2015
- Genre: Country
- Length: 13:13:00
- Label: Republic Nashville
- Producer: Ross Copperman; Jeremy Stover

Eli Young Band chronology
10,000 Towns (2014)	Turn It On (2015)	Fingerprints (2017)

Singles from Turn It On
- 1. "Turn It On" Released: March 9, 2015

Turn It On is the second EP from American country music band Eli Young Band. It was released on March 10, 2015, and its title track was released as a single to country radio, with a music video debuted during the previous week.

== Track listing ==
Turn It On
No.	Title	Writer(s)	Length
1.	"Turn It On"	Rodney Clawson, Matt Dragstrem, Mike Eli	2:46
2.	"Plastic"	Ross Copperman, Eli, Ashley Gorley, Jeremy Stover	3:39
3.	"Your Place or Mine"	Copperman, Eli, Jon Jones, Stover	3:51
4.	"Drink You Up"	Copperman, Eli, Jones, Stover	2:57
Total length:			13:13

== Charts ==
=== Album ===
Chart (2015)	Peak position	Sales
US Billboard 200	113	US: 7,100
US Top Country Albums (Billboard)	11	US: 7,100

=== Singles ===
Year	Single	Peak position	
Year	Single	US Country	US Country Airplay
2015	"Turn It On"	42	37
