= Dust (Eli Young Band song) =

Single by Eli Young Band

from the album 10,000 Towns
- Released: February 3, 2014
- Genre: Country
- Length: 3:20
- Label: Republic Nashville
- Songwriters: Jon Jones; James Young; Kyle Jacobs; Josh Osborne
- Producers: Frank Liddell; Justin Niebank; Eli Young Band

Eli Young Band singles chronology
"Drunk Last Night" (2013)	"Dust" (2014)	"Turn It On" (2015)

"Dust" is a song recorded by American country music group the Eli Young Band. It was released on February 3, 2014 as the second single from their fifth studio album, 10,000 Towns. The song was written by Jon Jones, James Young, Kyle Jacobs and Josh Osborne.

== Critical reception ==
The song received a favorable review from Taste of Country, which said that "it rocks like they’ve never rocked on radio before." The reviewer described it as "fun, but not at the expense of poignancy" and "built to be a slow burn." Matt Bjorke of Roughstock gave the song four and a half stars out of five, writing that "the guitars and all-around sound are clearly Eli Young Band and less trend chasing, which is nice to see." He called it "a strongly-written song with an inviting, uplifting melody." Kevin John Coyne of Country Universe gave the song a B grade, calling it "professionally done and not too cluttered." He felt that there was "nothing identifiably country about it, but then again, nothing identifiably bad, either."

== Music video ==
The music video was directed by Peter Zavadil and premiered in May 2014.

== Chart performance ==
"Dust" debuted at number 53 on the U.S. Billboard Country Airplay chart for the week of February 15, 2014. It also debuted at number 42 on the U.S. Billboard Hot Country Songs chart for the week of February 22, 2014. The song has sold 323,000 copies in the U.S. as of September 2014.

Chart (2014)	Peak position
Canada Country (Billboard)	33
US Billboard Hot 100	79
US Country Airplay (Billboard)	15
US Hot Country Songs (Billboard)	19

=== Year-end charts ===
Chart (2014)	Position
US Country Airplay (Billboard)	51
US Hot Country Songs (Billboard)	50

== Certifications ==
Region	Certification	Certified units/sales
United States (RIAA)	Gold	323,000
