= Always the Love Songs =

Single by Eli Young Band

from the album Jet Black & Jealous
- Released: September 29, 2008
- Genre: Country
- Length: 3:42
- Label: Universal South
- Songwriters: George Ducas; David Lee Murphy
- Producers: Erik Herbst; Mike Wrucke

Eli Young Band singles chronology
"When It Rains" (2007)	"Always the Love Songs" (2008)	"Radio Waves" (2009)

"Always the Love Songs" is a song written by David Lee Murphy and George Ducas, and recorded by American country music group Eli Young Band. It was released in September 2008 as the second single from the album Jet Black & Jealous. This song is also the band's second chart entry on Billboard Hot Country Songs, as well as their first top 20 hit.

== Content ==
"Always the Love Songs" is a mid-tempo song with electric guitar accompaniment. In it, the male narrator recalls a point earlier in his life, when he and his friends would gather around a bonfire, pass around a guitar, and sing songs. He states that it was "always the love songs" that he recalled the most from these sing-alongs.

== Critical reception ==
Country Standard Time critic Brian Steinberg cited "Always the Love Songs" as a standout track on the album, saying that it showed a sense of interplay among the band members that was comparable to The Wallflowers. Andrew Leahey, reviewing the album for Allmusic, also compared the song's sound to that of The Wallflowers, saying that its intro was borrowed from "6th Avenue Heartache".

== Music video ==
The music video for "Always the Love Songs" is of a live performance, and is directed by the band.

== Chart performance ==
Chart (2008–2009)	Peak position
US Hot Country Songs (Billboard)	11
US Billboard Hot 100	69

=== Year-end charts ===
Chart (2009)	Position
US Country Songs (Billboard)	52

== Certifications ==
Region	Certification	Certified units/sales
United States (RIAA)	Gold	500,000^{‡}
^{‡} Sales+streaming figures based on certification alone.
