= When It Rains (Eli Young Band song) =

Single by Eli Young Band

from the album Jet Black & Jealous
- Released: October 22, 2007
- Genre: Country
- Length: 4:15
- Label: Carnival, Universal South
- Songwriter(s): James Young
- Producer(s): Erik Herbst; Mike Wrucke

Eli Young Band singles chronology
"When It Rains" (2007)	"Always the Love Songs" (2008)

"When It Rains" is the debut single by American country music group Eli Young Band, released in October 2007 from their 2008 album Jet Black & Jealous. The song was written by band member James Young. A previous version of the song was featured on their 2005 album, Level. The 2007 release was the band's first chart entry on the Billboard Hot Country Songs chart.

== Critical reception ==
In his review of the album, Andrew Leahy of AllMusic gave the song a very positive review, praising its lyrics as well as the production, writing that "Like the other 11 songs on Jet Black & Jealous, the revamped version of "When It Rains" gleams with commercial sheen, from its polished vocals to the crisp mix of banjo, pedal steel, and electric guitar. But there's also a fiery quality to the song, whose twang is balanced by Nashville-gothic lyrics ("It's good to see the world in pain when I take a walk outside") and rock & roll guitars. Moments like that are the best part about Jet Black & Jealous."

== Music video ==
The first music video premiered in 2006 The second music video was directed by The Brads and premiered in 2008.

== Chart performance ==
The song spent 37 weeks on the country charts and peaked at No. 34.

Chart (2007–2008)	Peak position
US Hot Country Songs (Billboard)	34
