= Crazy Girl =

Single by Eli Young Band

from the album Life at Best
- Released: March 7, 2011
- Genre: Country
- Length: 3:21
- Label: Republic Nashville
- Songwriters: Liz Rose; Lee Brice
- Producers: Frank Liddell; Mike Wrucke

Eli Young Band singles chronology
"Guinevere" (2010)	"Crazy Girl" (2011)	"Even If It Breaks Your Heart" (2011)

"Crazy Girl" is a song recorded by the Eli Young Band, an American country music group. It was released in March 2011 as the fifth single of their career, and the first from their album Life at Best. It won song of the year at the 2012 ACM Awards. The song became their first number 1 hit on the Billboard Hot Country Songs chart and was named the Number 1 country song of 2011 on the Billboard Year-End Hot Country Songs chart.

== Content ==
Liz Rose co-wrote the song with Curb Records artist Lee Brice. According to Rose, the idea for the song came after the two began talking about how "females[…] have our crazy moments". Of the opening stanza, Rose said, "I know I've had those relationships on both sides, where you wanted to tell somebody[…]'Why don't you just chill? I'm not going anywhere!" Brice added that the song's melody "just took us to a place. It was kind of a sensitive kind of song, but it still had this edge to it that was really cool." He also thought that Rose was "good" at writing with a new artist such as him. Bassist Jon Jones said of the song, "Any time you find one [song] that's written a little differently, that's good."

== Critical reception ==
Kyle Ward of Roughstock gave the song four stars out of five, praising the "particularly good" melody and the "effectively charming" lyrics, although he thought that it would have been better with a third verse. Ben Foster of Country Universe gave the song a C grade, saying that the narrator's attitude sounds "plain disrespectful of the woman's feelings." He goes on to say that "beyond the chorus, the verses are innocuous enough, but there’s just nothing here to overcome the fact that the song’s hook falls spectacularly flat."

== Music video ==
The music video was directed by Brian Lazzaro and premiered in March 2011. A live music video was directed by Mason Dixon. The music video features a man and a woman, presumably a couple. The man rescues the woman from a psychiatric hospital. As they are about to leave the hospital, the video cuts to a guard behind them with his hands on his hips. Finally, this man, part of the Eli Young Band, wakes up on the tour bus with his girlfriend curled up beside him.

== Chart performance ==
=== Weekly charts ===
Chart (2011)	Peak position
Canada Country (Billboard)	4
Canada Hot 100 (Billboard)	66
US Hot Country Songs (Billboard)	1
US Billboard Hot 100	30

=== Year-end charts ===
Chart (2011)	Position
US Country Songs (Billboard)	1
US Billboard Hot 100	76

Chart (2012)	Position
US Ringtones (Billboard)	36

=== Decade-end charts ===
Chart (2010–2019)	Position
US Hot Country Songs (Billboard)	22

== Certifications ==
Region	Certification	Certified units/sales
Canada (Music Canada)	2× Platinum	160,000^{‡}
United States (RIAA)	5× Platinum	5,000,000^{‡}
^{‡} Sales+streaming figures based on certification alone.
