= Drunk Last Night =

Single by Eli Young Band

from the album 10,000 Towns
- Released: July 1, 2013
- Genre: Country
- Length: 3:38
- Label: Republic Nashville
- Songwriter(s): Josh Osborne; Laura Veltz
- Producer(s): Frank Liddell; Justin Niebank; Eli Young Band

Eli Young Band singles chronology
"Say Goodnight" (2012)	"Drunk Last Night" (2013)	"Dust" (2014)

"Drunk Last Night" is a song recorded by American country music group the Eli Young Band. It was released on July 1, 2013, as the first single from their fifth studio album, 10,000 Towns, their second for Republic Nashville. The song was written by Josh Osborne and Laura Veltz.

== Critical reception ==
Billy Dukes of Taste of Country gave the song three and a half stars out of five, writing that "the chorus is melodic and memorable [but] the verses are somewhat generic and forgettable." Matt Bjorke of Roughstock gave the song a favorable review, saying that "the performance from Eli Young Band is strong [and] the production showcases what has helped EYB break-out with an identifiable brand of country music."

== Music video ==
The music video was directed by Brian Lazzaro and premiered in September 2013.

== Chart and sales performance ==
"Drunk Last Night" debuted at number 57 on the U.S. Billboard Country Airplay chart for the week of June 29, 2013. It also debuted at number 23 on the U.S. Billboard Hot Country Songs chart, number 79 on the U.S. Billboard Hot 100 and number 63 on the Canadian Hot 100 for the week of July 13, 2013. It became their highest debut on the Hot Country Songs chart and sold 53,000 copies during its first week of release. As of March 2014, the song has sold 715,000 copies in the US. “Drunk Last Night” has the rare achievement of hitting the top of the Billboard Country Airplay chart without hitting number one on the Mediabase Country Airplay chart. As of January 2020, “Drunk Last Night” is the last song to have this achievement.

== Charts and certifications ==
=== Weekly charts ===
Chart (2013–2014)	Peak position
Canada (Canadian Hot 100)	51
Canada Country (Billboard)	2
US Billboard Hot 100	41
US Country Airplay (Billboard)	1
US Hot Country Songs (Billboard)	3

=== Year-end charts ===
Chart (2013)	Position
US Country Airplay (Billboard)	58
US Hot Country Songs (Billboard)	55

Chart (2014)	Position
US Country Airplay (Billboard)	62
US Hot Country Songs (Billboard)	65

=== Certifications ===
Region	Certification	Certified units/sales
United States (RIAA)	Platinum	715,000
