= Even If It Breaks Your Heart =

Single by Eli Young Band

from the album Life at Best
- Released: January 23, 2012
- Genre: Country
- Length: 3:40
- Label: Republic Nashville
- Songwriters: Will Hoge; Eric Paslay
- Producers: Frank Liddell; Mike Wrucke

Eli Young Band singles chronology
"Crazy Girl" (2011)	"Even If It Breaks Your Heart" (2012)	"Say Goodnight" (2012)

"Even If It Breaks Your Heart" is a song written by Will Hoge and Eric Paslay in April 2009 and originally recorded by Hoge on his seventh studio album, The Wreckage. The song was made popular by American country music group the Eli Young Band. It was released in January 2012 as the sixth single of their career, and the second from their album Life at Best.

== Critical reception ==
Billy Dukes of Taste of Country gave the song four stars out of five, saying that it is "poetry set to music" but the lyrics are "difficult to relate to." Jonathan Keefe of Country Universe wrote that it's a "good but not great song, given a credible performance by a competent band with the wherewithal not to want to sound like Journey" but "precious few guitar chords in the full duration of the performance actually ring to the full breadth of their tone, giving the single a clipped, tinny sound." He gave the song a B but the recording itself a D.

== Music video ==
The music video was directed by Brian Lazzaro and premiered in January 2012.

== Chart performance ==
"Even If It Breaks Your Heart" debuted at number 60 on the U.S. Billboard Hot Country Songs chart for the week of December 24, 2011. It also debuted at number 91 on the U.S. Billboard Hot 100 chart for the week of March 31, 2012. The song became the group's second consecutive number-one single on the country chart for the week of July 28, 2012.

== Charts ==
=== Weekly charts ===
Chart (2012)	Peak position
Canada Country (Billboard)	1
Canada Hot 100 (Billboard)	56
US Billboard Hot 100	29
US Hot Country Songs (Billboard)	1

=== Year-end charts ===
Chart (2012)	Position
US Billboard Hot 100	99
US Country Songs (Billboard)	7

== Certifications ==
Region	Certification	Certified units/sales
United States (RIAA)	3× Platinum	3,000,000^{‡}
^{‡} Sales+streaming figures based on certification alone.
