= Will Hoge =

American singer-songwriter

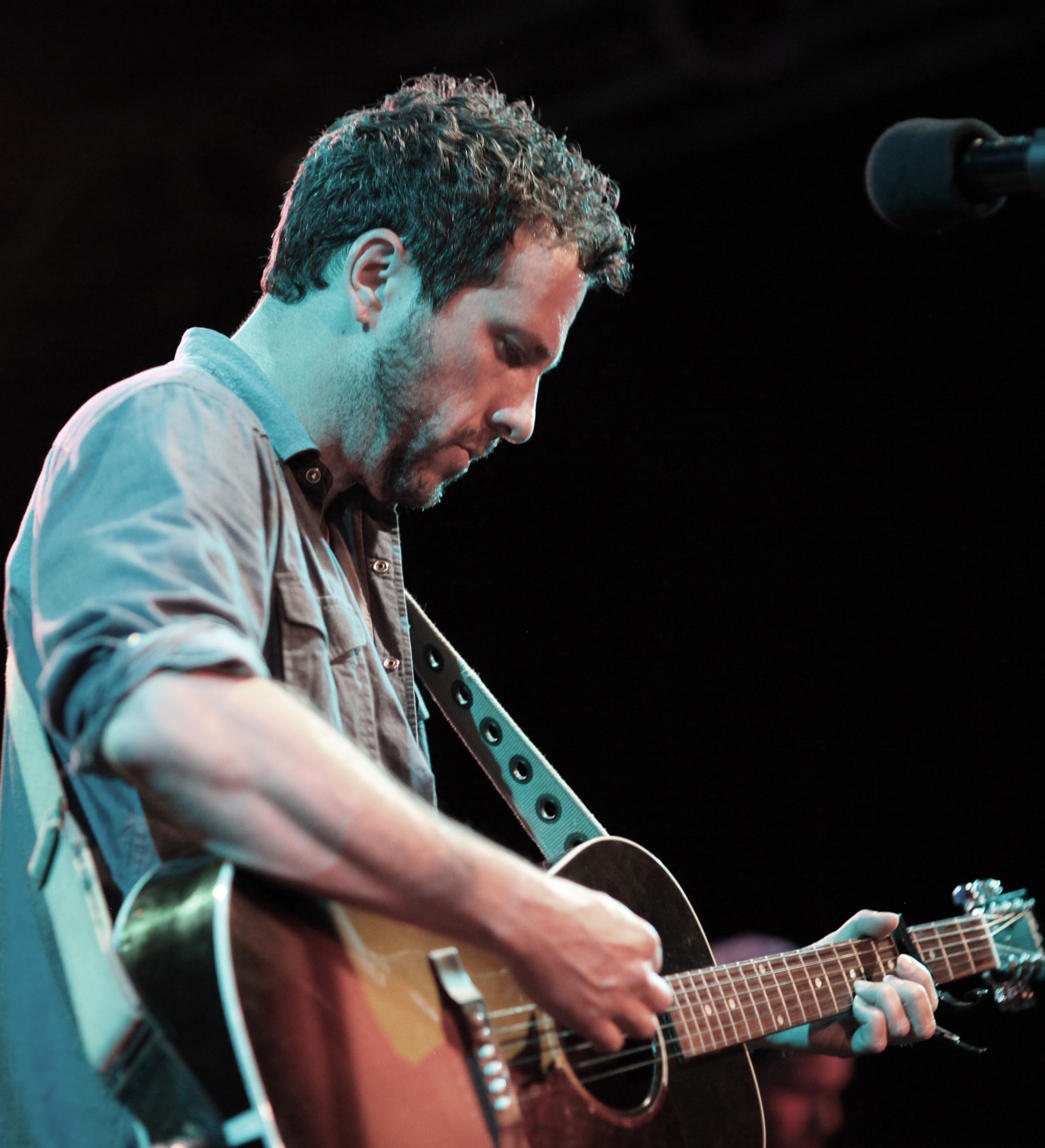
- Hoge in New York, August 21, 2014

Background information
- Born: November 14, 1972 (age 53); Nashville, Tennessee, U.S.
- Origin: Franklin, Tennessee, U.S.
- Genres: Americana, Southern rock, alternative country
- Occupation: Singer-songwriter
- Instruments: Vocals, guitar, harmonica
- Years active: 1998–present
- Label: Rykodisc
- Website: www.willhoge.com

Will Hoge (born November 14, 1972) is an American country music singer, songwriter, and musician from Nashville, Tennessee.

== Early life ==
Will Hoge was born and grew up in Franklin, Tennessee, located just south of Nashville. His sound was influenced by his musician father and uncles and the extensive record collection that his father kept.

Hoge attended Western Kentucky University to study history, planning to become a high school history teacher and basketball coach. He decided that he wanted to try his hand at rock and roll and began writing music. Will left the university after realizing he wanted to be a musician.

== Early band ==
Will released an early EP of original music with his band Spoonful in the mid-1990s. However, the band was not picked up and eventually disbanded. Some of these early songs were recycled on later albums, and are still hits with his loyal followers.

== Solo artist ==
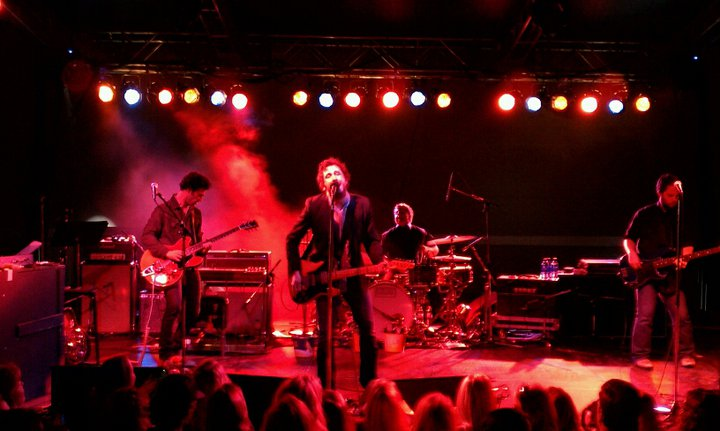
Hoge in concert, September 25, 2010 in Nashville

With former Georgia Satellites guitarist Dan Baird in tow, Hoge began touring the American south. He independently released his first CD, Live at the Exit/In, a live set recorded at the Nashville club. His original sound drew much attention and, through constant touring, he was able to release his first studio album, Carousel.

Hoge caught the attention of Atlantic Records music executives and he was signed to a record deal in early 2002. Atlantic then re-released Carousel to a wider market. His 2003 major label debut, Blackbird on a Lonely Wire was a cleaner sounding effort; however, the album was poorly promoted by Atlantic. Eventually, Hoge asked for and received a release from his contract, re-obtaining the rights to Carousel.

The support of his fans has given Hoge the ability to tour incessantly, and self-release a couple of live albums (2004's Almost Alone: Live at Smith's Olde Bar' and 2005's During the Before and After); a politically charged album called The America EP (which included a cover of Bob Dylan's "The Times They Are A-Changin')", which was followed by his next full-length LP, The Man Who Killed Love.

Over the years, Hoge has toured with many artists, including Midnight Oil, Shinedown, Needtobreathe, Marc Broussard, ZZ Top, the Cat Empire, Squeeze, Jason Isbell, Lisa Loeb and Edwin McCain. Bands that have opened for him include Steel Train, the Trews, the Elms, Rose Hill Drive, Needtobreathe, Moses Mayfield, the Alternate Routes, Aslyn, Katie Herzig, Missy Higgins, and the Civil Wars.

Hoge recorded the opening theme song "You Make Me Happy" for the CBS sitcom Still Standing.

On February 20, 2007, he released a live album, Again Somewhere Tomorrow from recordings made during the band's two-night stint at the Exit/In in Nashville, in September 2006.

The band's fourth studio album, Draw the Curtains, was released nationwide in October 2007 by Rykodisc Records. The album was initially released as a CD, with a limited edition 180-gram vinyl record version which followed later.

Following a motorcycle accident in August 2008, the band went on hiatus for seven months while Hoge recuperated from his injuries. In April 2009, the band got together for a 3-week acoustic tour of venues in the Midwest, Southeast and East Coast, hitting cities including New York City, Chicago, Nashville and Atlanta. When the tour ended in late April, the band headed back into the studio to complete the recording of their next album (of which they had begun at the time of Hoge's accident). Ken Coomer and Charlie Brocco again produced, and the album, The Wreckage, was released on September 29, 2009.

Hoge performed a residency at 12th & Porter in Nashville in June 2010. During these concerts, many of Hoge's friends, family, and former bandmates joined him on stage during the run of the four shows. These guests included former guitarists Dan Baird, Brian Layson, and Jason 'Slim' Gambill; former keyboard players Jefferson Crowe and John Lancaster; as well as Hoge's own father, who sang lead vocals on the final song of the concert series.

On August 29, 2009, Hoge and the band appeared and performed the single "Even If It Breaks Your Heart" on the CBS Early Show as the music guest.

Hoge opened for Needtobreathe on their spring 2010 tour. He also opened shows for Sugarland and Michelle Branch on select dates during their summer tour.

Hoge was part of a line-up, which included Keith Urban, Dierks Bentley, and Sheryl Crow, that performed on the nationally televised Music City Keep On Playin' flood relief program that aired on GAC on May 16, 2010. Hoge closed the show by performing his song "Washed by the Water".

Hoge opened for mainstream rock band Shinedown on their acoustic Anything & Everything tour in the fall of 2010.

In September 2011, Hoge released his seventh studio album entitled Number Seven. The album was his third release via Ryko. This time around, Hoge took over production duties for the entire album. The album's first single "When I Get My Wings" was released to radio in August 2011. The official music video for the song was added into rotation on both VH1 and CMT. During this time, Hoge was invited to perform on three occasions at the Grand Ole Opry, with country legend Vince Gill playing guitar and singing background vocals on a couple songs during his first appearance (Gill is a guest artist on Seven as well, as he and his wife, Amy Grant are fans of Hoge).

In a September 2012 blog post on his website, Hoge announced a number of changes. He left Rykodisc Records after releasing three albums with them. Longtime drummer Sigurdur 'Siggi' Birkis was released from the band. He also announced in a Twitter post that Lady Antebellum was recording a cover of his song "Better Off Now (That You're Gone)", from his 2003 release Blackbird On A Lonely Wire. Lady A's version of the song would later appear on their 2013 album Golden.

In October 2012 Hoge announced via Twitter than he has signed a songwriting deal with BMG Nashville.

Hoge received a Country Music Association nomination, an Academy of Country Music nomination and a Grammy nomination for "Country Song of the Year" for "Even If It Breaks Your Heart". The song was recorded by the Eli Young Band and reached #1 on the country charts.

In 2013, he released Never Give In. The album debuted at 129 on the Billboard 200, his highest debut on the chart, selling 3,000 copies in the US. The album's final track "Strong" was featured in a television commercial for Chevy trucks and contributed to the album's success.

On April 7, 2015, Hoge released his album Small Town Dreams. The album debuted at No. 162 on the Billboard 200 and No. 15 on the Top Country Albums chart, selling 3,700 copies for the week.

On August 11, 2017, Hoge released Anchors, which debuted at No. 14 on the Independent Albums chart, with 1,900 copies sold in its first week. Sheryl Crow makes an appearance on the album, providing harmony vocals on the song "Little Bit of Rust."

In 2018, Hoge released his 11th studio album, the politically-charged My American Dream. He also toured with punk rock band Social Distortion after lead singer Mike Ness heard Hoge on satellite radio, thanks to a free subscription with his new car. Ness invited Hoge to tour together.

Hoge's other album releases include Tiny Little Movies (2020), Wings On My Shoes (2022), Tenderhearted Boys (2024) and Sweet Misery (2025). In February 2026 Hoge released the single "The Epstein Files," a scathing critique of Donald Trump and his connections to late financier and convicted sex trafficker Jeffrey Epstein.

== Motorcycle accident ==
Hoge was involved in a motorcycle accident on August 20, 2008 after leaving a studio session for what would be his next album, "The Wreckage." He was traveling north on Main Street in East Nashville at about 8 p.m. when a van traveling southbound failed to yield while turning into 712 Main St. Hoge's motorcycle collided with the passenger side of the van. He was admitted to Vanderbilt University Medical Center in critical condition. He went into surgery immediately upon arrival at the hospital for numerous broken bones (ribs, sternum, shattered femur, knee cap, shoulder blades), and lacerations to his face, arms, and torso requiring over 200 stitches. Hoge's condition was upgraded to stable on August 22. No evidence was found that alcohol or drugs were involved in the accident.

In the year following the accident, Hoge went through numerous surgical procedures (mainly on his shattered femur/leg) and intensive physical therapy. Work on The Wreckage, as well as tour dates, were postponed through spring 2009. Since that point, Hoge has made a full recovery.

== Current band members ==
- Thom Donovan - lead guitar, backing vocals
- Allen Jones - Drums/percussion
- Christopher Griffiths - Bass

== Discography ==
- Carousel (2001)
- Blackbird on a Lonely Wire (2003)
- The Man Who Killed Love (2006)
- Draw the Curtains (2007)
- The Wreckage (2009)
- Number Seven (2011)
- Modern American Protest Music (2012)
- Never Give In (2013)
- Small Town Dreams (2015)
- Anchors (2017)
- My American Dream (2018)
- Tiny Little Movies (2020)
- Wings on My Shoes (2022)
- Tenderhearted Boys (2024)
- Sweet Misery (2025)
